= 2012–13 FC Anzhi Makhachkala season =

Anzhi Makhachkala
2012–13 season
- Chairman: Suleyman Kerimov
- Manager: Guus Hiddink
- Stadium: Dinamo Stadium; Anzhi Arena
- Premier League: 3rd
- Russian Cup: Runners-up
- Europa League: Last 16 vs Newcastle United
- Top goalscorer: League: Lacina Traoré (9); All: Samuel Eto'o (15)
- Highest home attendance: 26,200 vs Krylia Sovetov Samara; 17 March 2013
- Lowest home attendance: 5,000 vs Honvéd; 19 July 2012 vs Vitesse Arnhem; 2 August 2012 vs Newcastle United; 7 March 2013
- Average home league attendance: 13,415
Home colours	Away colours

The 2012–13 FC Anzhi Makhachkala season was the 3rd successive season that the club played in the Russian Premier League, the highest tier of football in Russia. Anzhi Makhachkala finished the season in Third place, qualifying for the 2013–14 UEFA Europa League Group stage, whilst they also where Runners Up to CSKA Moscow in the Russian Cup and reached the Round of 16 of the 2012–13 UEFA Europa League where they were knocked out by Newcastle United.

== Season events ==
Anzhi Makhachkala's away game against Zenit St. Petersburg on 10 December was played behind closed doors.

Anzhi Makhachkala's home UEFA Europa League knockout phase games where played at the Luzhniki Stadium in Moscow instead of their regular Dynamo Stadium in Makhachkala, due to security issues involving the city of Makhachkala and the autonomous republic of Dagestan.

== Squad ==
As of match played 1 June 2013

No.	Name	Nationality	Position	Date of birth (age)	Signed from	Signed in	Contract ends	Apps.	Goals
Goalkeepers
1	Vladimir Gabulov	(Russia)	GK	19 October 1983 (aged 29)	Dynamo Moscow	2011		55	0
22	Yevgeny Pomazan	(Russia)	GK	31 January 1989 (aged 24)	CSKA Moscow	2011		13	0
26	Azamat Dzhioev	(Russia)	GK	6 January 1991 (aged 22)	Spartak Moscow	2011		0	0
27	Mehdi Jannatov	(Russia)	GK	26 January 1992 (aged 21)	Trainee	2010		0	0
97	Islamkhan Gadzhiyasulov	(Russia)	GK	18 May 1997 (aged 16)	Trainee	2012		0	0
Defenders
2	Andrey Yeshchenko	(Russia)	DF	9 February 1984 (aged 29)	Lokomotiv Moscow	2013		5	0
3	Ali Gadzhibekov	(Russia)	DF	6 September 1983 (aged 29)	Trainee	2006		91	2
5	João Carlos	(Brazil)	DF	1 January 1982 (aged 31)	Genk	2011		71	5
7	Kamil Agalarov	(Russia)	DF	11 June 1988 (aged 24)	Dagdizel Kaspiysk	2008		114	3
13	Rasim Tagirbekov	(Russia)	DF	4 May 1984 (aged 29)	Trainee	2002		299	20
15	Arseny Logashov	(Russia)	DF	20 August 1991 (aged 21)	FC Khimki	2011		41	0
18	Yuri Zhirkov	(Russia)	DF	20 August 1983 (aged 29)	Chelsea	2011		62	3
33	Emir Spahić	(Bosnia and Herzegovina)	DF	18 August 1980 (aged 32)	loan from Sevilla	2013	2013	9	1
37	Ewerton	(Brazil)	DF	23 March 1989 (aged 24)	Corinthians Alagoano	2012	2016	12	0
44	Murad Qurbanov	(Russia)	DF	22 June 1992 (aged 20)	Eintracht Frankfurt U17	2010		0	0
56	Jamal Rasulov	(Russia)	DF	28 February 1992 (aged 21)	Unattached	2011		0	0
70	Yuri Udunyan	(Russia)	DF	25 August 1994 (aged 18)	Trainee	2011		0	0
93	Islam Suleymanov	(Russia)	DF	2 June 1993 (aged 19)	Zenit-2 St.Petersburg	2011		0	0
Midfielders
6	Mbark Boussoufa	(Morocco)	MF	15 August 1984 (aged 28)	Anderlecht	2011		83	13
8	Jucilei	(Brazil)	MF	6 April 1988 (aged 25)	Corinthians	2011		74	2
10	Willian	(Brazil)	MF	9 August 1988 (aged 24)	Shakhtar Donetsk	2013		13	1
14	Oleg Shatov	(Russia)	MF	29 July 1990 (aged 22)	Viz-Sinara Ekaterinburg	2012		47	5
16	Mehdi Carcela	(Morocco)	MF	1 July 1989 (aged 23)	Standard Liège	2011		43	2
17	Sharif Mukhammad	(Russia)	MF	21 March 1990 (aged 23)	Trainee	2010		10	0
25	Odil Ahmedov	(Uzbekistan)	MF	25 November 1987 (aged 25)	Pakhtakor Tashkent	2011		81	5
53	Ismail Korgoloyev	(Russia)	MF	15 March 1994 (aged 19)	Trainee	2012		0	0
57	Magomed Gamidov	(Russia)	MF	20 September 1994 (aged 18)	Trainee	2011		0	0
78	Azret Omarov	(Russia)	MF	30 July 1993 (aged 19)	Unattached	2012		0	0
85	Lassana Diarra	(France)	MF	10 March 1985 (aged 28)	Real Madrid	2012		23	1
Forwards
9	Samuel Eto'o	(Cameroon)	FW	10 March 1981 (aged 32)	Internazionale	2011		66	34
19	Lacina Traoré	(Ivory Coast)	FW	20 May 1990 (aged 23)	Kuban Krasnodar	2012		39	17
20	Fyodor Smolov	(Russia)	FW	9 February 1990 (aged 23)	loan from Dynamo Moscow	2012	2013	19	1
28	Serder Serderov	(Russia)	FW	10 March 1994 (aged 19)	CSKA Moscow	2012		6	1
32	Shamil Mirzayev	(Russia)	FW	28 November 1992 (aged 20)	Trainee	2010		0	0
71	Magomedzagir Zagirov	(Russia)	FW	8 January 1994 (aged 19)	Trainee	2012		0	0
73	Mariz Saidov	(Russia)	FW	8 February 1995 (aged 18)	Trainee	2012		0	0
94	Islamnur Abdulavov	(Russia)	FW	7 March 1994 (aged 19)	Dynamo Kyiv	2011		0	0
Away on loan
21	Abdulla Gadzhikadiyev	(Russia)	GK	10 April 1993 (aged 20)	Trainee	2012		0	0
81	Nikita Burmistrov	(Russia)	FW	6 July 1989 (aged 23)	Amkar Perm	2012		6	1
Players who left during the season
4	Christopher Samba	(Republic of the Congo)	DF	28 March 1984 (aged 29)	Blackburn Rovers	2012	2016	39	4
10	Shamil Lakhiyalov	(Russia)	FW	28 October 1979 (aged 33)	Krasnodar	2011			
21	Georgy Gabulov	(Russia)	MF	4 September 1988 (aged 24)	Alania Vladikavkaz	2012		13	1
24	Aleksei Ivanov	(Russia)	MF	1 September 1981 (aged 31)	Saturn Ramenskoye	2011		27	1
29	Badavi Huseynov	(Azerbaijan)	DF	11 July 1991 (aged 21)	Dagdizel Kaspiysk	2010		0	0
47	Eldar Jangishiev	(Russia)	DF	26 July 1994 (aged 18)	Trainee	2011		0	0
	Miro Slavov	(Ukraine)	FW	8 September 1990 (aged 22)	Girondins de Bordeaux	2010		2	0

=== On loan ===
Note: Flags indicate national team as defined under FIFA eligibility rules; some limited exceptions apply. Players may hold more than one non-FIFA nationality.

No. / Pos. / Nation / Player; 21 / GK / RUS / Abdulla Gadzhikadiyev (at Dagdizel Kaspiysk)	No. / Pos. / Nation / Player; 81 / FW / RUS / Nikita Burmistrov (at Amkar Perm)

== Transfers ==
=== In ===
Date	Position	Nationality	Name	From	Fee	Ref.
29 June 2012	FW	(Ivory Coast)	Lacina Traoré	Kuban Krasnodar	Undisclosed	
10 July 2012	FW	(Russia)	Serder Serderov	CSKA Moscow	Undisclosed	
3 August 2012	DF	(Brazil)	Ewerton	Corinthians Alagoano	Undisclosed	
3 September 2012	MF	(France)	Lassana Diarra	Real Madrid	Undisclosed	
3 September 2012	FW	(Russia)	Nikita Burmistrov	Amkar Perm	Undisclosed	
12 January 2013	DF	(Russia)	Andrey Yeshchenko	Lokomotiv Moscow	Undisclosed	
2 February 2013	MF	(Brazil)	Willian	Shakhtar Donetsk	Undisclosed	

=== Loans in ===
Date from	Position	Nationality	Name	From	Date to	Ref.
10 July 2012	FW	(Russia)	Fyodor Smolov	Dynamo Moscow	30 June 2013	
1 March 2013	DF	(Bosnia and Herzegovina)	Emir Spahić	Sevilla	30 June 2013	

=== Out ===
Date	Position	Nationality	Name	To	Fee	Ref.
3 July 2012	FW	(Czech Republic)	Jan Holenda	Rostov	Undisclosed	
12 July 2012	DF	(Cameroon)	Benoît Angbwa	Rostov	Undisclosed	
13 July 2012	FW	(Russia)	Ilya Kukharchuk	Ural Sverdlovsk Oblast	Undisclosed	
31 August 2012	FW	(Ukraine)	Miro Slavov	First Vienna	Undisclosed	
6 September 2012	MF	(Russia)	Aleksei Ivanov	Mordovia Saransk	Undisclosed	
1 January 2013	MF	(Russia)	Georgy Gabulov	Alania Vladikavkaz	Undisclosed	
20 January 2013	FW	(Russia)	Shamil Lakhiyalov	Krylia Sovetov	Undisclosed	
31 January 2013	DF	(Republic of the Congo)	Christopher Samba	Queens Park Rangers	£12,500,000	

=== Loans out ===
Date from	Position	Nationality	Name	To	Date to	Ref.
24 January 2013	FW	(Russia)	Nikita Burmistrov	Amkar Perm	30 June 2013	

=== Released ===
Date	Position	Nationality	Name	Joined	Date	Ref.
7 July 2012	GK	(Russia)	Aleksandr Makarov	Sibir Novosibirsk	13 July 2012	
7 July 2012	MF	(Russia)	Makhach Gadzhiyev	Tavriya Simferopol		
30 June 2013	GK	(Russia)	Azamat Dzhioev			

== Friendlies ==
28 June 2012	Kapfenberger SV	1–3	Anzhi Makhachkala	Kapfenberg
20:00 MSK (UTC+4)	Kuljić 48' (pen.)	Summary	1' (o.g.); Eto'o 39', 59' (pen.)	Stadium: Franz Fekete Stadium; Referee: Kislik Alfred (Austria)

10 July 2012	Kufstein	0–7	Anzhi Makhachkala	Kufstein
21:00 MSK (UTC+4)		Summary	Traoré 17'; Boussoufa 43'; Shatov 51', 76'; Zhirkov 63'; Smolov 80'; Gadzhibekov 87'	Stadium: Kufstein Arena

20 January 2013	Anzhi Makhachkala	0–1	(Uzbekistan) Pakhtakor Tashkent	Dubai, UAE
13:00 MSK (UTC+4)		Summary	Miladinović 76'	Stadium: Franz Fekete Stadium; Referee: Mohamed Obaid Kadem (UAE)

== Competitions ==
=== Premier League ===
==== Results summary ====
Overall								Home						Away					
Pld	W	D	L	GF	GA	GD	Pts	W	D	L	GF	GA	GD	W	D	L	GF	GA	GD
30	15	8	7	45	34	+11	53	10	5	0	30	15	+15	5	3	7	15	19	−4

Last updated: 26 May 2013.
Source: See Results

==== Results by round ====
Round	1	2	3	4	5	6	7	8	9	10	11	12	13	14	15	16	17	18	19	20	21	22	23	24	25	26	27	28	29	30
Ground	H	A	H	A	H	H	A	H	A	H	A	H	A	H	A	H	A	H	A	A	H	A	H	A	H	A	H	A	H	A
Result	W	D	W	L	D	W	W	W	W	W	W	W	L	W	D	D	W	W	D	L	D	L	D	W	D	L	W	L	W	L
Position	3	4	3	7	7	6	4	3	2	1	1	1	2	2	3	2	2	1	2	2	2	3	3	3	3	3	3	3	3	3

Updated to match(es) played on 26 May 2013. Source: See Results
A = Away; H = Home; W = Win; D = Draw; L = Loss

==== Results ====
21 July 2012 1	Anzhi Makhachkala	2–1	Kuban Krasnodar	Makhachkala
20:00 MSK (UTC+4)	Eto'o 31'; Traoré 43'	Report	João Carlos 1' (o.g.); Ionov (yellow card) 30'; Tsorayev (yellow card) 38'; Lolo (yellow card) 64'; Zelão (yellow card) 69'; Armaș (yellow card) 76'	Stadium: Dynamo Stadium; Attendance: 13,500; Referee: Maksim Layushkin

28 July 2012 2	Rostov	2–2	Anzhi Makhachkala	Rostov
20:00 MSK (UTC+4)	Saláta (yellow card) 18'; Gațcan (yellow card) 38'; Kirichenko 74' (pen.); Sheshukov (yellow card) 83'; Holenda 88'; Malyaka (yellow card) 89'	Report	Jucilei (yellow card) 18' (yellow-red card) 30'; Tagirbekov 49', 90+5' (yellow card) 73'; Logashov (yellow card) 63'; Samba (yellow card) 71'; Zhirkov (yellow card) 73'	Stadium: Olimp-2; Attendance: 13,200; Referee: Aleksei Eskov

4 August 2012 3	Anzhi Makhachkala	1–0	Amkar Perm	Makhachkala
19:00 MSK (UTC+4)	G.Gabulov (yellow card) 21' (goal) 72'	Report	Burmistrov (yellow card) 49'; Jakubko (yellow card) 89'	Stadium: Dynamo Stadium; Attendance: 14,000; Referee: Vladislav Bezborodov

12 August 2012 4	CSKA Moscow	1–0	Anzhi Makhachkala	Khimki
17:00 MSK (UTC+4)	Wernbloom (yellow card) 54'; Tošić 74'	Report	João Carlos (yellow card) 43'; Logashov (yellow card) 50'; Agalarov (yellow card) 55' (yellow-red card) 85'; V.Gabulov (yellow card) 74'; Eto'o (yellow card) 85'; Shatov (yellow card) 90'	Stadium: Arena Khimki; Attendance: 10,000; Referee: Sergei Karasev

19 August 2012 5	Anzhi Makhachkala	1–1	Zenit St.Petersburg	Makhachkala
21:00 MSK (UTC+4)	João Carlos (yellow card) 15'; Tagirbekov (yellow card) 40'; Shatov 65' (yellow card) 72'; G.Gabulov (yellow card) 90+'; Shatov (yellow card) 90+'	Report	Zyryanov 20'; Lombaerts (yellow card) 80'; Đorđević (yellow card) 81'	Stadium: Dynamo Stadium; Attendance: 15,200; Referee: Vladimir Kazmenko

26 August 2012 6	Anzhi Makhachkala	4–2	Mordovia Saransk	Makhachkala
19:00 MSK (UTC+4)	Traoré 14'; Dujmović 41' (o.g.); Ewerton (yellow card) 47'; Eto'o 79', 81' (yellow card) 79'	Report	R.Mukhametshin 35'; Rogov 64'	Stadium: Dynamo Stadium; Attendance: 14,500; Referee: Timur Arslanbekov

1 September 2012 7	Krylia Sovetov	1–2	Anzhi Makhachkala	Samara
18:15 MSK (UTC+4)	Tsallagov (yellow card) 5'; Balyaikin (yellow card) 47'; Vyeramko (yellow card) 71'; Zeballos (yellow card) 79' (goal) 83'; Svezhov (yellow card) 90+'	Report	Samba 26'; Traoré 56'; Boussoufa (yellow card) 58'; Shatov (yellow card) 73'; Jucilei (yellow card) 79'	Stadium: Metallurg Stadium; Attendance: 12,500; Referee: Alexander Yegorov

16 September 2012 8	Anzhi Makhachkala	5–2	Krasnodar	Makhachkala
17:30 MSK (UTC+4)	Shatov 1'; João Carlos 4'; Eto'o 14', 87'; Boussoufa 48'	Report	Abreu 38'; Vranješ 52'; Ignatyev (yellow card) 77'	Stadium: Dynamo Stadium; Attendance: 14,000; Referee: Vitali Meshkov

24 September 2012 9	Alania Vladikavkaz	0–1	Anzhi Makhachkala	Vladikavkaz
18:00 MSK (UTC+4)	Neco (yellow card) 16'; Maurício (yellow card) 79'	Report	Traoré 7'; Agalarov (yellow card) 44'; Diarra (yellow card) 47'; Jucilei (yellow card) 75'; Tagirbekov (yellow card) 90+'	Stadium: Republican Spartak Stadium; Attendance: 21,500; Referee: Vladislav Bezborodov

30 September 2012 10	Anzhi Makhachkala	2–1	Volga Nizhny Novgorod	Makhachkala
16:00 MSK (UTC+4)	Eto'o 45+1'; Traoré 62'; João Carlos (yellow card) 81'; Carcela (yellow card) 90+'	Report	Asildarov (yellow card) 10'; Maksimov 59' (yellow card) 68'; Kharitonov (yellow card) 73'; Shulenin (yellow card) 75'	Stadium: Dynamo Stadium; Attendance: 14,100; Referee: Maksim Layushkin

7 October 2012 11	Dynamo Moscow	0–2	Anzhi Makhachkala	Khimki
13:30 MSK (UTC+4)	Schildenfeld (red card) 52'; Yusupov (yellow card) 58'; Rykov (yellow card) 82'	Report	Carlos (red card) 10'; Agalarov (yellow card) 13'; Zhirkov 76'; Eto'o 87'	Stadium: Arena Khimki; Attendance: 7,712; Referee: Alexander Yegorov

20 October 2012 12	Anzhi Makhachkala	2–1	Spartak Moscow	Makhachkala
13:30 MSK (UTC+4)	Boussoufa (yellow card) 41'; Eto'o (yellow card) 44'; Traoré 64'; Insaurralde 90+4' (o.g.)	Report	Welliton (yellow card) 32'; Bilyaletdinov 35'; Ari (yellow card) 38'; Källström (yellow card) 40'; K.Kombarov (yellow card) 45+1' (yellow-red card) 46'; Insaurralde (yellow card) 79'; Pesyakov (yellow card) 90'	Stadium: Dynamo Stadium; Attendance: 15,600; Referee: Eduard Malyi

28 October 2012 13	Rubin Kazan	2–1	Anzhi Makhachkala	Kazan
18:30 MSK (UTC+4)	Kuzmin 5'; Kasaev 19'	Report	Traoré 10'	Stadium: Central Stadium; Attendance: 8,181; Referee: Timur Arslanbekov

4 November 2012 14	Anzhi Makhachkala	3–1	Terek Grozny	Makhachkala
15:45 MSK (UTC+4)	Boussoufa 9'; Traoré 17'; João Carlos (yellow card) 31'; Samba 64'	Report	Georgiev 54' (pen.); Lebedenko (yellow card) 63'; Kudryashov (yellow card) 71'	Stadium: Dynamo Stadium; Attendance: 14,500; Referee: Alexander Yegorov

11 November 2012 15	Lokomotiv Moscow	1–1	Anzhi Makhachkala	Moscow
13:30 MSK (UTC+4)	Caicedo (yellow card) 57'; N'Doye 84'	Report	Carcela (yellow card) 48' (goal) 72'; Traoré (yellow card) 50'; Boussoufa (yellow card) 57'	Stadium: Lokomotiv Stadium; Attendance: 11,657; Referee: Aleksei Nikolaev

18 November 2012 16	Anzhi Makhachkala	0–0	Rostov	Makhachkala
18:30 MSK (UTC+4)	Eto'o (yellow card) 86'	Report		Stadium: Dynamo Stadium; Attendance: 14,000; Referee: Timur Arslanbekov

26 November 2012 17	Amkar Perm	1–2	Anzhi Makhachkala	Perm
15:30 MSK (UTC+4)	Semyonov 26'	Report	Ahmedov 28'; Shatov 90+2'	Stadium: Zvezda Stadium; Attendance: 6,300; Referee: Aleksei Eskov

1 December 2012 18	Anzhi Makhachkala	2–0	CSKA Moscow	Makhachkala
13:30 MSK (UTC+4)	Shatov (yellow card) 41'; Zhirkov (yellow card) 45'; Traoré 57'; Boussoufa 78'	Report	Cauņa (yellow card) 19' (yellow-red card) 45+1'; Nababkin (yellow card) 43'	Stadium: Dynamo Stadium; Attendance: 15,500; Referee: Vladislav Bezborodov

10 December 2012 19	Zenit St. Petersburg	1–1	Anzhi Makhachkala	Saint Petersburg
20:00 MSK (UTC+4)	Denisov (yellow card) 43'; Zyryanov 66'; Hulk (yellow card) 86'; Danny (red card) 90+2'	Report	João Carlos 24'; Diarra (yellow card) 40'	Stadium: Petrovsky Stadium; Attendance: 0 Referee: Maksim Layushkin

10 March 2013 20	Mordovia Saransk	2–0	Anzhi Makhachkala	Saransk
16:30 MSK (UTC+4)	Perendija 3'; R.Mukhametshin 73'	Report	Spahić (yellow card) 33'; Boussoufa (yellow card) 39'; Traoré (yellow card) 90+'	Stadium: Start Stadium; Attendance: 5,896; Referee: Sergei Karasev

17 March 2013 21	Anzhi Makhachkala	1–1	Krylia Sovetov	Makhachkala
15:45 MSK (UTC+4)	João Carlos (yellow card) 44'; Traoré 81'; Ahmedov (yellow card) 90+'	Report	Amisulashvili (yellow card) 18' (yellow-red card) 37'; Kornilenko 63'; Vyeramko (yellow card) 88'	Stadium: Anzhi Arena; Attendance: 26,200; Referee: Vitali Meshkov

31 March 2013 22	Krasnodar	4–0	Anzhi Makhachkala	Krasnodar
15:45 MSK (UTC+4)	Wánderson 33', 59', 89'; Petrov (yellow card) 35'; Joãozinho 47'	Report	Diarra (yellow card) 35'; Abreu (yellow card) 85'	Stadium: Kuban Stadium; Attendance: 18,800; Referee: Aleksei Nikolaev

7 April 2013 23	Anzhi Makhachkala	0–0	Alania Vladikavkaz	Makhachkala
17:00 MSK (UTC+4)	Traoré (yellow card) 87'	Report	Khubulov (yellow card) 18'; Goore (yellow card) 25'; Bakayev (yellow card) 69'; Prudnikov (yellow card) 77'	Stadium: Anzhi Arena; Attendance: 19,700; Referee: Timur Arslanbekov

14 April 2013 24	Volga Nizhny Novgorod	0–3	Anzhi Makhachkala	Nizhny Novgorod
14:00 MSK (UTC+4)	Ropotan (yellow card) 26' (yellow-red card) 67'; Bordian (yellow card) 61'; Belozyorov (yellow card) 67'	Report	Spahić (yellow card) 15' (goal) 33'; Traoré 40'; Diarra (yellow card) 62'; Willian 73'	Stadium: Lokomotiv Stadium; Attendance: 12,000; Referee: Vladislav Bezborodov

21 April 2013 25	Anzhi Makhachkala	3–3	Dynamo Moscow	Makhachkala
18:30 MSK (UTC+4)	Boussoufa (yellow card) 38' (yellow-red card) 47' (goal) 39'; Zhirkov 51'; Eto'o 67'	Report	Wilkshire (yellow card) 27'; Noboa 36'; Granat (yellow card) 53'; Gatagov 73'; Fernández (yellow card) 78'; Kurányi 88'; Solomatin (yellow card) 90'	Stadium: Anzhi Arena; Attendance: 24,500; Referee: Sergey Lapochkin

28 April 2013 26	Spartak Moscow	2 – 0	Anzhi Makhachkala	Moscow
13:30 MSK (UTC+4)	Källström 5'; Vukojević (yellow card) 27'; D.Kombarov 69' (pen.)	Report	Spahić (yellow card) 24'; Agalarov (yellow card) 50'; Gabulov (red card) 66'; Smolov (yellow card) 88'	Stadium: Luzhniki Stadium; Attendance: 18,467; Referee: Aleksei Nikolaev

4 May 2013 27	Anzhi Makhachkala	2–1	Rubin Kazan	Makhachkala
18:00 MSK (UTC+4)	Traoré 86'; Eto'o 90'; Tagirbekov (yellow card) 90+4'	Report	Kvirkvelia (yellow card) 12'; Ansaldi (yellow card) 29'; Eremenko 82'	Stadium: Anzhi Arena; Attendance: 21,000; Referee: Vladimir Kazmenko

12 May 2013 28	Terek Grozny	1–0	Anzhi Makhachkala	Grozny
16:00 MSK (UTC+4)	Ferreira (yellow card) 20'; Ivanov (yellow card) 22'; Píriz 27' (yellow card) 34'; Komorowski (yellow card) 40'	Report	Spahić (yellow card) 34'	Stadium: Akhmat-Arena; Attendance: 22,800; Referee: Vitali Meshkov

20 May 2013 29	Anzhi Makhachkala	2–1	Lokomotiv Moscow	Makhachkala
19:00 MSK (UTC+4)	Ćorluka 40' (o.g.); Eto'o 74'	Report	Torbinski (yellow card) 18'; Denisov (yellow card) 29'; Samedov 34'; Ćorluka (yellow card) 53'; Tarasov (yellow card) 53'	Stadium: Anzhi Arena; Attendance: 23,000; Referee: Vladislav Bezborodov

26 May 2013 30	Kuban Krasnodar	1–0	Anzhi Makhachkala	Krasnodar
13:30 MSK (UTC+4)	Popov 24' (yellow card) 24'; Xandão (yellow card) 41'	Report	Shatov (yellow card) 90+'	Stadium: Kuban Stadium; Attendance: 31,743; Referee: Mikhail Vilkov

==== League table ====
Pos	Team	Pld	W	D	L	GF	GA	GD	Pts	Qualification or relegation
1	CSKA Moscow (C)	30	20	4	6	49	25	+24	64	Qualification for the Champions League group stage
2	Zenit St. Petersburg	30	18	8	4	53	25	+28	62	Qualification for the Champions League third qualifying round
3	Anzhi Makhachkala	30	15	8	7	45	34	+11	53	Qualification for the Europa League group stage
4	Spartak Moscow	30	15	6	9	51	39	+12	51	Qualification to Europa League play-off round
5	Kuban Krasnodar	30	14	9	7	48	28	+20	51	Qualification for the Europa League third qualifying round

Source: Russian Premier League
Rules for classification: 1) points; 2) number of wins; 3) head-to-head points; 4) number of head-to-head wins; 5) head-to-head goal difference; 6) number of head-to-head goals scored; 7) number of head-to-head away goals scored; 8) goal difference; 9) number of goals scored; 10) number of away goals scored; 11) position in the 2011–12 season (only used until all the regularly scheduled games have been played); 11) extra play-off game or tournament between the teams in question.
(C) Champions

=== Russian Cup ===
27 September 2012 Round of 32	Ural Sverdlovsk Oblast	0 – 0 (a.e.t.) (2 – 4 p)	Anzhi Makhachkala	Yekaterinburg
18:00 MSK (UTC+4)	Bochkov (yellow card) 49'; Gogniyev (yellow card) 71' (penalty missed) 105'; Dantsev (yellow card) 95'	Report	Tagirbekov (yellow card) 56'; Jucilei (yellow card) 71'; Traoré (red card) 100'; G.Gabulov (yellow card) 105'; Serderov (yellow card) 114'	Stadium: Central Stadium; Attendance: 26,000; Referee: Vyacheslav Kharlamov
	Penalties
	Acevedo (penalty scored); Shchanitsyn (penalty missed); Gogniyev (penalty scored); Vještica (penalty missed)		Smolov (penalty scored); Shatov (penalty missed); Serderov (penalty scored); Tagirbekov (penalty scored); Jucilei (penalty scored)

31 October 2012 Round of 16	Anzhi Makhachkala	2–1	Krylia Sovetov	Makhachkala
16:00 MSK (UTC+4)	Burmistrov 21'; Tagirbekov (red card) 63'; Serderov 87'	Report	Petrov 8'; Zeballos (yellow card) 66'; Bruno Teles (yellow card) 83'	Stadium: Dynamo Stadium; Attendance: 12,500; Referee: Vladimir Kazmenko

17 April 2013 Quarter-Finals	Anzhi Makhachkala	1–0	Dynamo Moscow	Makhachkala
18:00 MSK (UTC+4)	Logashov (yellow card) 24'; Eto'o 99' (pen.) (yellow card) 114'; Gadzhibekov (yellow card) 113'	Report	Dzsudzsák (yellow card) 98'; Wilkshire (yellow card) 105'; Yusupov (yellow card) 108'	Stadium: Anzhi Arena; Attendance: 16,000; Referee: Alexander Yegorov

8 May 2013 Semi-Finals	Zenit St. Petersburg	0–1	Anzhi Makhachkala	Saint Petersburg
19:30 MSK (UTC+4)	Shirokov (yellow card) 45+'; Hubočan (yellow card) 61'; Luís Neto (yellow card) 83'; Hulk (yellow card) 90+'	Report	Zhirkov (yellow card) 35'; Eto'o 61'; V.Gabulov (yellow card) 90+'	Stadium: Petrovsky Stadium; Attendance: 19,441; Referee: Sergei Karasev

1 June 2013 Final	CSKA Moscow	1–1 (a.e.t.) (4–3 p)	Anzhi Makhachkala	Grozny
13:30 MSK (UTC+4)	Musa 11'; Wernbloom (red card) 87'	Report	Diarra 74' (yellow card) 77'; Boussoufa (yellow card) 81'; Zhirkov (yellow card) 90'	Stadium: Terek Stadium; Attendance: 28,000; Referee: Alexander Yegorov
	Penalties
	Mamayev (penalty scored); V. Berezutski (penalty scored); Musa (penalty missed); Vágner Love (penalty scored); Doumbia (penalty scored)		(penalty scored) Boussoufa; (penalty missed) Zhirkov; (penalty scored) Willian; (penalty missed) Jucilei; (penalty scored) Eto'o

=== UEFA Europa League ===
==== Qualifying phase ====
19 July 2012 2nd Qualifying Round 1st leg	Anzhi Makhachkala (Russia)	1–0	(Hungary) Honvéd	Ramenskoye, Russia
19:00 MSK (UTC+4)	Jucilei 22'; Zhirkov (yellow card) 43'; Samba (yellow card) 90'	Report		Stadium: Saturn Stadium; Attendance: 5,000; Referee: Alon Yefet (Israel)

26 July 2012 2nd Qualifying Round 2nd leg	Budapest Honvéd (Hungary)	0–4 (0–5 agg.)	(Russia) Anzhi Makhachkala	Budapest, Hungary
20:30 MSK (UTC+4)	Lovrić (yellow card) 55'; Vernes (red card) 55'	Report	Eto'o 7', 81'; Tagirbekov (yellow card) 9'; João Carlos (yellow card) 13'; Traoré 53'; Shatov 68'	Stadium: Bozsik Stadion; Attendance: 5,100; Referee: Luca Banti (Italy)

2 August 2012 3rd Qualifying Round 1st leg	Anzhi Makhachkala (Russia)	2–0	(Netherlands) Vitesse Arnhem	Ramenskoye, Russia
19:00 MSK (UTC+4)	Tagirbekov (yellow card) 9'; Jucilei (yellow card) 45'; Shatov 63'; Smolov 74'	Report	Pröpper (yellow card) 21' van der Struijk (yellow card) 59'; Reis (yellow card) 86'	Stadium: Saturn Stadium; Attendance: 5,000; Referee: Ruddy Buquet (France)

9 August 2012 3rd Qualifying Round 2nd leg	Vitesse Arnhem (Netherlands)	0–2 (0–4 agg.)	(Russia) Anzhi Makhachkala	Arnhem, Netherlands
22:00 MSK (UTC+4)	Cziommer (yellow card) 21' (yellow-red card) 59'	Report	Agalarov (yellow card) 46'; Eto'o 48', 84' (pen.)	Stadium: GelreDome; Attendance: 13,892; Referee: Michael Oliver (England)

23 August 2012 Play off Round 1st leg	Anzhi Makhachkala (Russia)	1–0	(Netherlands) AZ	Ramenskoye, Russia
20:00 MSK (UTC+4)	Tagirbekov (yellow card) 49'; Traoré 51'	Report	Martens (yellow card) 80'; Berghuis (yellow card) 90+1'	Stadium: Saturn Stadium; Attendance: 6,030; Referee: Michael Koukoulakis (Greece)

30 August 2012 Play off Round 2nd leg	AZ (Netherlands)	0–5 (0–6 agg.)	(Russia) Anzhi Makhachkala	Alkmaar, Netherlands
23:00 MSK (UTC+4)		Report	Boussoufa 17'; Logashov (yellow card) 37'; Eto'o 45+2'; Carcela (yellow card) 73' (goal) 83'; Traoré 79'; Lakhiyalov 90+4'	Stadium: AFAS Stadion; Attendance: 11,512; Referee: Svein Oddvar Moen (Norway)

==== Group stage ====
Pos	Team	Pld	W	D	L	GF	GA	GD	Pts	Qualification	LIV	ANZ	YB	UDI
1	(England) Liverpool	6	3	1	2	11	9	+2	10 (Note: Head-to-head points: Liverpool 7, Anzhi Makhachkala 6, Young Boys 4.)	Advance to knockout phase	—	1–0	2–2	2–3
2	(Russia) Anzhi Makhachkala	6	3	1	2	7	5	+2	10	Advance to knockout phase	1–0	—	2–0	2–0
3	(Switzerland) Young Boys	6	3	1	2	14	13	+1	10		3–5	3–1	—	3–1
4	(Italy) Udinese	6	1	1	4	7	12	−5	4		0–1	1–1	2–3	—

Source: Soccerway
Notes:

20 September 2012 1	Udinese (Italy)	1–1	(Russia) Anzhi Makhachkala	Udine, Italy
21:00 MSK (UTC+4)	Pereyra (yellow card) 18'; Danilo (yellow card) 80'; Benatia (yellow card) 90'; Di Natale 90+2'	Report	Padelli 45' (o.g.); Zhirkov (yellow card) 83'; Boussoufa (yellow card) 90'	Stadium: Stadio Friuli; Attendance: 7,220; Referee: Hüseyin Göçek (Turkey)

4 October 2012 2	Anzhi Makhachkala (Russia)	2–0	(Switzerland) Young Boys	Ramenskoye, Russia
20:00 MSK (UTC+4)	Tagirbekov (yellow card) 5'; Samba (yellow card) 59'; Eto'o 62' (pen.), 90'; Carcela (yellow card) 85'	Report	Frey (yellow card) 84'; Costanzo (yellow card) 88'	Stadium: Saturn Stadium; Attendance: 8,000; Referee: Felix Zwayer (Germany)

25 October 2012 3	Liverpool (England)	1–0	(Russia) Anzhi Makhachkala	Liverpool, England
23:05 MSK (UTC+4)	Downing 53'; Suárez (yellow card) 75'; Agger (yellow card) 81'	Report	Samba (yellow card) 21'; Agalarov (yellow card) 43'	Stadium: Anfield; Attendance: 39,358; Referee: Bas Nijhuis (Netherlands)

8 November 2012 4	Anzhi Makhachkala (Russia)	1–0	(England) Liverpool	Ramenskoye, Russia
21:00 MSK (UTC+4)	Traoré 45+1'	Report	Flanagan (yellow card) 65' Shelvey (yellow card) 88'	Stadium: Saturn Stadium; Attendance: 15,000; Referee: David Fernández Borbalán (Spain)

22 November 2012 5	Anzhi Makhachkala (Russia)	2–0	(Italy) Udinese	Ramenskoye, Russia
21:00 MSK (UTC+4)	Samba 72'; Eto'o 75'; Zhirkov (yellow card) 79'; Boussoufa (yellow card) 88'	Report	Willians (yellow card) 45' (yellow-red card) 80'; Di Natale (yellow card) 66'; Domizzi (yellow card) 80'	Stadium: Saturn Stadium; Attendance: 8,556; Referee: Serge Gumienny (Belgium)

6 December 2012 6	Young Boys (Switzerland)	3–1	(Russia) Anzhi Makhachkala	Bern, Switzerland
22:00 MSK (UTC+4)	Zárate 38'; Costanzo 52'; González 90' (yellow card) 90+1'	Report	João Carlos (yellow card) 8'; Traoré (yellow card) 33' (yellow-red card) 69'; Tagirbekov (yellow card) 48'; Ahmedov 45+2'	Stadium: Stade de Suisse; Attendance: 17,132; Referee: Matej Jug (Slovenia)

==== Knockout phase ====
14 February 2013 Round of 32; First leg	Anzhi Makhachkala (Russia)	3–1	(Germany) Hannover 96	Moscow, Russia
21:00 MSK (UTC+4)	Eto'o 34'; Ahmedov 48'; Boussoufa 64'; Zhirkov (yellow card) 68'	Report	Huszti 22'; Schulz (yellow card) 90+1'	Stadium: Luzhniki Stadium; Attendance: 6,676; Referee: Marijo Strahonja (Croatia)
Note: Match played at the Luzhniki Stadium in Moscow, instead of Anzhi's regular Dynamo Stadium in Makhachkala.

21 February 2013 Round of 32; Second leg	Hannover 96 (Germany)	1–1 (2–4 agg.)	(Russia) Anzhi Makhachkala	Hannover, Germany
01:05 MSK (UTC+4)	Pinto 70'; Sakai (yellow card) 77'; Diouf (yellow card) 87'; Ya Konan (yellow card) 88'; Huszti (yellow card) 90+4'	Report	Logashov (yellow card) 30'; Boussoufa (yellow card) 40'; Ewerton (yellow card) 45'; V.Gabulov (yellow card) 65'; Eto'o (yellow card) 71'; Traoré 90+9'	Stadium: AWD-Arena; Attendance: 27,500; Referee: Jonas Eriksson (Sweden)

7 March 2013 Round of 16; First leg	Anzhi Makhachkala (Russia)	0–0	(England) Newcastle United	Moscow, Russia
21:00 MSK (UTC+4)		Report	Haïdara (yellow card) 34'	Stadium: Luzhniki Stadium; Attendance: 9,948; Referee: István Vad (Hungary)
Note: Match played at the Luzhniki Stadium in Moscow, instead of Anzhi's regular Dynamo Stadium in Makhachkala.

15 March 2013 Round of 16; Second leg	Newcastle United (England)	1–0 (1–0 agg.)	(Russia) Anzhi Makhachkala	Newcastle upon Tyne, England
00:05 MSK (UTC+4)	Anita (yellow card) 57'; Cissé 90+3'	Report	Carcela (yellow card) 48' (yellow-red card) 55'; Zhirkov (yellow card) 86'	Stadium: St James' Park; Attendance: 45,487; Referee: Deniz Aytekin (Germany)

== Squad statistics ==
As of match played 1 June 2013

=== Appearances and goals ===
No.	Pos	Nat	Player	Total		Premier League		Russian Cup		Europa League	
No.	Pos	Nat	Player	Apps	Goals	Apps	Goals	Apps	Goals	Apps	Goals
1	GK	(Russia) RUS	Vladimir Gabulov	45	0	26+1	0	3	0	15	0
2	DF	(Russia) RUS	Andrey Yeshchenko	6	0	2	0	0	0	4	0
3	DF	(Russia) RUS	Ali Gadzhibekov	14	0	7+1	0	5	0	0+1	0
5	DF	(Brazil) BRA	João Carlos	45	2	25	2	4	0	16	0
6	MF	(Morocco) MAR	Mbark Boussoufa	43	6	24+2	4	3+1	0	13	2
7	DF	(Russia) RUS	Kamil Agalarov	22	0	14	0	0+1	0	6+1	0
8	MF	(Brazil) BRA	Jucilei	46	1	27	0	5	0	14	1
9	FW	(Cameroon) CMR	Samuel Eto'o	44	21	24+1	10	2+1	2	16	9
10	FW	(Brazil) BRA	Willian	13	1	6+1	1	3	0	3	0
13	DF	(Russia) RUS	Rasim Tagirbekov	35	2	22	2	4	0	8+1	0
14	MF	(Russia) RUS	Oleg Shatov	41	5	18+6	3	1+2	0	11+3	2
15	DF	(Russia) RUS	Arseny Logashov	32	0	15+4	0	3	0	8+2	0
16	MF	(Morocco) MAR	Mehdi Carcela	36	2	9+11	1	2	0	6+8	1
17	MF	(Russia) RUS	Sharif Mukhammad	3	0	1+2	0	0	0	0	0
18	MF	(Russia) RUS	Yuri Zhirkov	39	2	19+4	2	4	0	9+3	0
19	FW	(Ivory Coast) CIV	Lacina Traoré	39	17	20+4	12	0+3	0	8+4	5
20	FW	(Russia) RUS	Fyodor Smolov	20	1	2+8	0	2+1	0	1+6	1
22	GK	(Russia) RUS	Yevgeny Pomazan	8	0	4+1	0	2	0	1	0
25	MF	(Uzbekistan) UZB	Odil Akhmedov	37	3	13+9	1	1+3	0	11	2
28	FW	(Russia) RUS	Serder Serderov	6	1	1+3	0	0+2	1	0	0
33	DF	(Bosnia and Herzegovina) BIH	Emir Spahić	9	1	7	1	1+1	0	0	0
37	DF	(Brazil) BRA	Ewerton	13	0	7	0	2	0	4	0
85	MF	(France) FRA	Lassana Diarra	24	1	14	0	3	1	7	0
Players away from the club on loan:
81	FW	(Russia) RUS	Nikita Burmistrov	6	1	1+3	0	2	1	0	0
Players who appeared for Anzhi Makhachkala no longer at the club:
4	DF	(Republic of the Congo) CGO	Christopher Samba	29	3	17	2	0	0	12	1
10	FW	(Russia) RUS	Shamil Lakhiyalov	17	1	2+6	0	2	0	0+7	1
21	MF	(Russia) RUS	Georgy Gabulov	13	1	2+5	1	1	0	2+3	0
24	MF	(Russia) RUS	Aleksei Ivanov	1	0	1	0	0	0	0	0

=== Goal scorers ===
Place	Position	Nation	Number	Name	Premier League	Russian Cup	UEFA Europa League	Total
1	FW	(Cameroon)	9	Samuel Eto'o	10	2	9	21
2	FW	(Ivory Coast)	19	Lacina Traoré	12	0	5	17
3	MF	(Morocco)	6	Mbark Boussoufa	4	0	2	6
4	MF	(Russia)	14	Oleg Shatov	3	0	2	5
5				Own goal	3	0	1	4
6	DF	(Republic of the Congo)	4	Christopher Samba	2	0	1	3
6	MF	(Uzbekistan)	25	Odil Ahmedov	1	0	2	3
8	DF	(Russia)	13	Rasim Tagirbekov	2	0	0	2
8	MF	(Morocco)	16	Mehdi Carcela	1	0	1	2
8	DF	(Brazil)	5	João Carlos	2	0	0	2
8	MF	(Russia)	18	Yuri Zhirkov	2	0	0	2
12	MF	(Russia)	21	Georgy Gabulov	1	0	0	1
12	DF	(Bosnia and Herzegovina)	33	Emir Spahić	1	0	0	1
12	FW	(Brazil)	10	Willian	1	0	0	1
12	FW	(Russia)	28	Serder Serderov	0	1	0	1
12	MF	(Russia)	81	Nikita Burmistrov	0	1	0	1
12	MF	(France)	85	Lassana Diarra	0	1	0	1
12	MF	(Brazil)	8	Jucilei	0	0	1	1
12	FW	(Russia)	10	Shamil Lakhiyalov	0	0	1	1
12	FW	(Russia)	20	Fyodor Smolov	0	0	1	1
				TOTALS	45	5	26	76

=== Clean Sheets ===
Place	Position	Nation	Number	Name	Premier League	Russian Cup	UEFA Europa League	Total
1	GK	(Russia)	1	Vladimir Gabulov	6	2	9	17
2	GK	(Russia)	22	Yevgeny Pomazan	1	1	0	2
				TOTALS	7	3	9	19

=== Disciplinary record ===
Number	Nation	Position	Name	Premier League		Russian Cup		UEFA Europa League		Total	
Number	Nation	Position	Name	Yellow card	Red card	Yellow card	Red card	Yellow card	Red card	Yellow card	Red card
1	(Russia)	GK	Vladimir Gabulov	1	1	1	0	1	0	3	1
3	(Russia)	DF	Ali Gadzhibekov	0	0	1	0	1	0	2	0
5	(Brazil)	DF	João Carlos	5	1	0	0	2	0	7	1
6	(Morocco)	MF	Mbark Boussoufa	6	1	1	0	3	0	10	1
7	(Russia)	DF	Kamil Agalarov	5	1	0	0	2	0	7	1
8	(Brazil)	MF	Jucilei	4	1	1	0	0	0	5	1
9	(Cameroon)	FW	Samuel Eto'o	4	0	1	0	1	0	6	0
13	(Russia)	DF	Rasim Tagirbekov	4	0	1	1	5	0	10	1
14	(Russia)	MF	Oleg Shatov	5	0	0	0	1	0	6	0
15	(Russia)	DF	Arseny Logashov	2	0	1	0	1	0	4	0
16	(Morocco)	MF	Mehdi Carcela	2	0	0	0	4	0	6	0
18	(Russia)	MF	Yuri Zhirkov	2	0	2	0	5	0	9	0
19	(Ivory Coast)	FW	Lacina Traoré	3	0	1	1	2	1	6	2
20	(Russia)	FW	Fyodor Smolov	1	0	0	0	0	0	1	0
25	(Uzbekistan)	MF	Odil Ahmedov	2	0	0	0	0	0	2	0
28	(Russia)	FW	Serder Serderov	0	0	1	0	0	0	1	0
33	(Bosnia and Herzegovina)	DF	Emir Spahić	4	0	0	0	0	0	4	0
37	(Brazil)	DF	Ewerton	1	0	0	0	1	0	2	0
85	(France)	MF	Lassana Diarra	4	0	0	0	0	0	4	0
Players away on loan:
Players who left Anzhi Makhachkala during the season:
4	(Republic of the Congo)	DF	Christopher Samba	1	0	0	0	3	0	4	0
21	(Russia)	MF	Georgy Gabulov	2	0	1	0	0	0	3	0
			TOTALS	58	5	12	2	32	2	102	9

== Awards ==
=== Player of the Month ===
Month	Name	Award
September	(Cameroon) Samuel Eto'o	Won
