= 2012–13 Russian Cup =

Tournament details
- Country: Russia
- Teams: 107

Final positions
- Champions: CSKA Moscow (7th title)
- Runners-up: Anzhi Makhachkala

Tournament statistics
- Top goal scorer: Ahmed Musa (4 goals)

The 2012–13 Russian Cup, known as the 2012–13 Pirelli–Russian Football Cup for sponsorship reasons, was the 21st season of the Russian football knockout tournament since the dissolution of Soviet Union.

The competition started on 11 July 2012 and finished with the final held on 1 June 2013. The cup winner was won a spot in the 2013–14 UEFA Europa League group stage.

== First round ==
This round featured 35 Second Division teams and 1 amateur team. The matches were played between 11 and 17 July 2012.

=== West Section ===
Team 1	Score	Team 2
Piter Saint Petersburg (III)	2–1	Rus Saint Petersburg (III)
FC Vologda (III)	0–1	FC Dolgoprudny (III)

=== Center Section ===
Team 1	Score	Team 2
Spartak Tambov (III)	0–3	Sokol Saratov (III)
Metallurg Vyksa (III)	1–1 (a.e.t.) (4–2 p)	Zvezda Ryazan (III)
FC Kaluga (III)	4–1	Podolye Podolsky district (III)
Arsenal Tula (III)	0–1	FC Gubkin (III)

=== South Section ===
Team 1	Score	Team 2
Volgar-Astrakhan Astrakhan (III)	2–4	FC Astrakhan (III)
Olimpia Volgograd (III)	2–1	Energiya Volzhsky (III)
MITOS Novocherkassk (III)	1–2	FC Taganrog (III)
Angusht Nazran (III)	1–1 (a.e.t.) (4–5 p)	Kavkaztransgaz-2005 Ryzdvyany (III)
Mashuk-KMV Pyatigorsk (III)	2–2 (a.e.t.) (3–4 p)	Alania-d Vladikavkaz (III)

=== Ural-Povolzhye Section ===
Team 1	Score	Team 2
Dynamo Kirov (III)	0–3	Zenit-Izhevsk Izhevsk (III)
Spartak Yoshkar-Ola (III)	0–1	Rubin-2 Kazan (III)
Akademiya Togliatti (III)	1–3	Lada-Togliatti Togliatti (III)

=== East section ===
Team 1	Score	Team 2
Dynamo Barnaul (III)	4–0	Sibir-2 Novosibirsk (III)
Sibiryak Bratsk (III)	4–0	FC Restavratsiya Krasnoyarsk (IV)
Baikal Irkutsk (III)	2–0	FC Chita (III)
Yakutiya Yakutsk (III)	0–2 (a.e.t.)	Amur-2010 Blagoveshchensk (III)

== Second round ==
In this round entered 18 winners from the First Round and 38 Second Division teams. The matches were played between 29 July and 5 August 2012.

=== West Section ===
Team 1	Score	Team 2
Pskov-747 Pskov (III)	5–0	Piter Saint Petersburg
Karelia Petrozavodsk (III)	0–0 (a.e.t.) (1–4 p)	Sever Murmansk (III)
Spartak Kostroma (III)	0–2	Tekstilshchik Ivanovo (III)
Khimik Dzerzhinsk (III)	2–1	Volga Tver (III)
Znamya Truda Orekhovo-Zuyevo (III)	0–2	Lokomotiv-2 Moscow (III)
FC Dolgoprudny	2–1	Dnepr Smolensk (III)

=== Center Section ===
Team 1	Score	Team 2
Sokol Saratov	4–1	Zenit Penza (III)
Lokomotiv Liski (III)	0–2	Fakel Voronezh (III)
Vityaz Podolsk (III)	1–0	Metallurg Vyksa
FC Oryol (III)	0–1 (a.e.t.)	FC Kaluga
FC Gubkin	1–0	Metallurg-Oskol Stary Oskol (III)
Avangard Kursk (III)	4–3	Metallurg Lipetsk (III)

=== South Section ===
Team 1	Score	Team 2
FC Astrakhan	2–1	Olimpia Volgograd
FC Taganrog	4–3	SKA Rostov-on-Don (III)
Torpedo Armavir (III)	2–2 (a.e.t.) (4–3 p)	Biolog-Novokubansk Progress (III)
Chernomorets Novorossiysk (III)	2–0	Slavyansky Slavyansk-na-Kubani (III)
Kavkaztransgaz-2005 Ryzdvyany	4–0	Dagdizel Kaspiysk (III)
Alania-d Vladikavkaz	4–0	Druzhba Maykop (III)

=== Ural-Povolzhye Section ===
Team 1	Score	Team 2
Gornyak Uchaly (III)	3–0	Oktan Perm (III)
FC Tyumen (III)	1–0	FC Chelyabinsk (III)
Gazovik Orenburg (III)	1–0	Nosta Novotroitsk (III)
Zenit-Izhevsk Izhevsk	2–2 (a.e.t.) (5–3 p)	KAMAZ Naberezhnye Chelny (III)
Rubin-2 Kazan	0–1	Volga Ulyanovsk (III)
Lada-Togliatti Togliatti	2–2 (a.e.t.) (4–5 p)	Syzran-2003 Syzran (III)

=== East Section ===
Team 1	Score	Team 2
Irtysh Omsk (III)	1–2	Dynamo Barnaul
Baikal Irkutsk	1–2	Sibiryak Bratsk
Amur-2010 Blagoveshchensk	2–0	Smena Komsomolsk-na-Amure (III)
Sakhalin Yuzhno-Sakhalinsk (III)	0–0 (a.e.t.) (4–3 p)	Luch-Energiya Vladivostok (III)

== Third round ==
In this round entered 28 winners from the Second Round. The matches were played between 10 and 18 August 2012.

=== West Section ===
Team 1	Score	Team 2
Sever Murmansky	0–1	Pskov-747 Pskov
Tekstilshchik Ivanovo	0–3	Khimik Dzerzhinsk
Lokomotiv-2 Moscow	2–0	FC Dolgoprudny

=== Center Section ===
Team 1	Score	Team 2
Fakel Voronezh	0–1	Sokol Saratov
FC Kaluga	5–1	Vityaz Podolsk
FC Gubkin	2–2 (a.e.t.) (6–5 p)	Avangard Kursk

=== South Section ===
Team 1	Score	Team 2
FC Taganrog	1–3 (a.e.t.)	FC Astrakhan
Chernomorets Novorossiysk	0–1	Torpedo Armavir
Kavkaztransgaz-2005 Ryzdvyany	1–2	Alania-d Vladikavkaz

=== Ural-Povolzhye Section ===
Team 1	Score	Team 2
Gornyak Uchaly	2–3	FC Tyumen
Zenit-Izhevsk Izhevsk	1–2	Gazovik Orenburg
Volga Ulyanovsk	2–1 (a.e.t.)	Syzran-2003 Syzran

=== East Section ===
Team 1	Score	Team 2
Dynamo Barnaul	3–4	Sibiryak Bratsk
Amur-2010 Blagoveshchensk	2–0	Sakhalin Yuzhno-Sakhalinsk

== Fourth round ==
The 14 winners from the Third Round and the 17 FNL teams entered this round. The matches were played on 1 and 2 September 2012.

Team 1	Score	Team 2
Pskov-747 Pskov	1–2	Baltika Kaliningrad (II)
Lokomotiv-2 Moscow	2–0	Petrotrest Saint Petersburg (II)
Volga Ulyanovsk	2–1	Shinnik Yaroslavl (II)
Khimik Dzerzhinsk	w/o	Torpedo Vladimir
FC Kaluga	0–1	Torpedo Moscow (II)
Sokol Saratov	1–2	FC Khimki (II)
FC Ufa (II)	0–1	Ural Sverdlovsk Oblast (II)
Gazovik Orenburg	3–0	Neftekhimik Nizhnekamsk (II)
FC Gubkin	1–1 (a.e.t.) (2–3 p)	Salyut Belgorod (II)
FC Astrakhan	3–2	Rotor Volgograd (II)
Torpedo Armavir	2–1	Volgar Astrakhan (II)
Alania-d Vladikavkaz	1–2	Spartak Nalchik (II)
Sibir Novosibirsk (II)	1–1 (a.e.t.) (3–4 p)	Tom Tomsk (II)
FC Tyumen	1–0	Metallurg-Kuzbass Novokuznetsk (II)
Sibiryak Bratsk	0–1	Yenisey Krasnoyarsk (II)
Amur-2010 Blagoveshchensk	0–1	SKA-Energiya Khabarovsk (II)

== Round of 32 ==
The 16 winners from the Fourth Round hosted the 2012–13 Russian Premier League teams in this round. The matches were played on 25, 26 and 27 September 2012.

25 September 2012	Baltika Kaliningrad	1–2	Zenit Saint Petersburg	Kaliningrad
20:00	Plopa 74'	Report	Hulk 13'; Alves 71'	Stadium: Baltika Stadium; Attendance: 14,500; Referee: Sergei Ivanov

26 September 2012	Lokomotiv-2 Moscow	0–1	Mordovia Saransk	Moscow
16:00		Report	Ivanov 71'	Stadium: Lokomotiv Perovo; Attendance: 500; Referee: Sergei Kostevich

26 September 2012	Volga Ulyanovsk	0–1	Kuban Krasnodar	Ulyanovsk
18:00		Report	Prudnikov 10'	Stadium: Trud Stadium; Attendance: 8,100; Referee: Aleksei Matyunin

26 September 2012	Khimik Dzerzhinsk	1–2	FC Krasnodar	Dzerzhinsk
18:00	Makeyev 70'	Report	Markov 80'; Yerokhin 84'	Stadium: Khimik Stadium; Attendance: 5,000; Referee: Vladimir Seldyakov

26 September 2012	Torpedo Moscow	0–3 awarded	Dynamo Moscow	Moscow
19:00	Boyarintsev 50'	Report	17', 32' Rykov	Stadium: Eduard Streltsov Stadium; Attendance: 8,000; Referee: Timur Arslanbekov
Note: The game was stopped in the first half and eventually abandoned in the 50th minute due to Torpedo fans throwing fireworks on the field during the celebrations of Boyarintsev's goal and was later awarded to Dynamo.

26 September 2012	FC Khimki	2–0	Volga Nizhny Novgorod	Khimki
19:00	Komkov 61'; Romaschenko 84'	Report	Bibilov (red card) 24'	Stadium: Arena Khimki; Attendance: 750; Referee: Eduard Malyi

27 September 2012	Ural Sverdlovsk Oblast	0–0 (a.e.t.) (2–4 p)	Anzhi Makhachkala	Yekaterinburg
18:00		Report		Stadium: Central Stadium; Attendance: 26,000; Referee: Vyacheslav Kharlamov
	Penalties
	Acevedo (penalty scored); Shchanitsyn (penalty missed); Gogniyev (penalty scored); Vještica (penalty missed)		(penalty scored) Smolov; (penalty missed) Shatov; (penalty scored) Serderov; (penalty scored) Tagirbekov; (penalty scored) Jucilei

27 September 2012	Gazovik Orenburg	2–4 (a.e.t.)	Krylia Sovetov Samara	Orenburg
16:00	Serdyukov 1'; Budylin 49' (pen.)	Report	Vorobyov 61'; Epureanu 71'; Delkin 113'; Svezhov 120+'	Stadium: Gazovik Stadium; Attendance: 4,800; Referee: Vasili Miroshnichenko

26 September 2012	Salyut Belgorod	1–2	Spartak Moscow	Belgorod
20:00	Mosquera 22'	Report	Ananidze 33' de Zeeuw 53'	Stadium: Salyut Stadium; Attendance: 7,000; Referee: Igor Nizovtsev

26 September 2012	FC Astrakhan	1–3	FC Rostov	Astrakhan
16:00	Sergei Sinyayev 42' (pen.)	Report	Cociș 23'; Kirichenko 63'; Česnauskis 72' (pen.)	Stadium: Astrakhangazprom Stadium; Attendance: 2,750; Referee: Vladimir Rogulev

26 September 2012	Torpedo Armavir	0–3	Lokomotiv Moscow	Armavir
16:00		Report	38' (pen.), 71' Sychev; Caicedo 64'	Stadium: Yunost Stadium; Attendance: 3,200; Referee: German Kravchenko

25 September 2012	Spartak Nalchik	1–3	Terek Grozny	Nalchik
18:00	Siradze 50'	Report	4' Komorowski; 20' N'Douassel; 44' Utsiyev	Stadium: Spartak Stadium; Attendance: 3,000; Referee: Igor Fedotov

26 September 2012	Tom Tomsk	0–1	CSKA Moscow	Tomsk
16:30		Report	Cauņa 42'	Stadium: Trud Stadium; Attendance: 9,000; Referee: Sergei Kuznetsov

27 September 2012	FC Tyumen	2–1	Alania Vladikavkaz	Tyumen
16:00	Pimenov 3'; Zimarev 28' (pen.)	Report	Mera 70'	Stadium: Geolog Stadium; Attendance: 9,000; Referee: Denis Shpilyov

26 September 2012	Yenisey Krasnoyarsk	2–1	Rubin Kazan	Krasnoyarsk
14:30	Sitdikov 18'; Nikitin 29'	Report	Davydov 90+'	Stadium: Central Stadium; Attendance: 12,300; Referee: Vasili Kazartsev

25 September 2012	SKA-Energiya Khabarovsk	2–1 (a.e.t.)	Amkar Perm	Khabarovsk
12:00	Arzumanyan 16'; Lutsenko 102'	Report	Ryabokobylenko 82'	Stadium: Lenin Stadium; Attendance: 7,000; Referee: Lasha Verulidze

== Round of 16 ==
The 16 winners from the Round of 32 round entered. The matches were played on 30 and 31 October 2012.

30 October 2012	Yenisey Krasnoyarsk	1–0	SKA-Energiya Khabarovsk	Krasnoyarsk
14:30 MSK (UTC+4)	Bazanov 21'	Report		Stadium: Central Stadium

30 October 2012	Mordovia Saransk	0–2	Zenit Saint Petersburg	Saransk
17:00 MSK (UTC+4)		Report	Semak 66'; Criscito 90+1'	Stadium: Start Stadium

30 October 2012	Kuban Krasnodar	1–0	FC Krasnodar	Krasnodar
19:30 MSK (UTC+4)	Pizzelli 19'	Report		Stadium: Kuban Stadium; Attendance: 18,660

30 October 2012	FC Rostov	0–0 (a.e.t.) (3–2 p)	Spartak Moscow	Rostov-on-Don
20:00 MSK (UTC+4)		Report		Stadium: Olimp – 2
	Penalties
	Kirichenko (penalty scored); Saláta (penalty missed); Blatnjak (penalty missed); Dyakov (penalty scored); Kalachev (penalty scored)		(penalty missed) Jurado; (penalty missed) K. Kombarov; (penalty scored) Ananidze; (penalty missed) Insaurralde; (penalty scored) Ari

31 October 2012	Anzhi Makhachkala	2–1	Krylia Sovetov Samara	Makhachkala
16:00 MSK (UTC+4)	Burmistrov 21'; Serderov 87'	Report	Petrov 8'	Stadium: Dynamo Stadium

31 October 2012	Terek Grozny	3–1 (a.e.t.)	Lokomotiv Moscow	Grozny
17:00 MSK (UTC+4)	Aílton 26' (pen.), 108'; Utsiyev 104'	Report	Caicedo 82'	Stadium: Akhmad Arena

31 October 2012	Dynamo Moscow	2–1	FC Khimki	Moscow
20:00 MSK (UTC+4)	Kurányi 82'; Panyukov 87'	Report	Sobolev 55'	Stadium: Arena Khimki

31 October 2012	CSKA Moscow	3–0	FC Tyumen	Moscow
20:00 MSK (UTC+4)	Honda 33'; Mamayev 69'; Musa 84'	Report		Stadium: Luzhniki Stadium

== Quarter-finals ==
The 8 winners from the Round of 16 round entered. The matches were played on 17 and 18 April 2013. The home teams in Dynamo–Anzhi and Rostov–Terek pairs were determined in a draw held on 7 November 2012. CSKA and Zenit will be home teams in their pairs due to playing more away games than Yenisey and Kuban respectively in earlier rounds. Yenisey from the National Championship is the lowest ranked team left in the competition.

17 April 2013	Anzhi Makhachkala	1–0 (a.e.t.)	Dynamo Moscow	Makhachkala
18:00 MSK (UTC+4)	Eto'o 99' (pen.)	Report		Stadium: Dynamo Stadium; Attendance: 16,000; Referee: Aleksander Egorov

17 April 2013	Zenit Saint Petersburg	0–0 (a.e.t.) (4−3 p)	Kuban Krasnodar	Saint Petersburg
19:30 MSK (UTC+4)		Report		Stadium: Petrovsky Stadium; Attendance: 19,000; Referee: Vladimir Kazmenko
	Penalties
	Kerzhakov (penalty scored); Luković (penalty scored); Faizulin (penalty missed); Denisov (penalty missed); Witsel (penalty scored); Semak (penalty scored)		(penalty scored) Bucur; (penalty scored) Popov; (penalty missed) Kaboré; (penalty missed) Dealbert; (penalty scored) Tsorayev; (penalty missed) Leandro

17 April 2013	CSKA Moscow	3–0	Yenisey Krasnoyarsk	Moscow
20:00 MSK (UTC+4)	Vágner Love 12'; Musa 65'; Mamayev 82'	Report		Stadium: Luzhniki Stadium; Attendance: 3,491; Referee: Mikhail Vilkov

18 April 2013	FC Rostov	0–0 (a.e.t.) (4–3 p)	Terek Grozny	Rostov-on-Don
18:00 MSK (UTC+4)		Report		Stadium: Olimp – 2 Attendance: 9,200; Referee: Alexei Eskov
	Penalties
	Kirichenko (penalty scored); Poloz (penalty scored); Sheshukov (penalty scored); Dyakov (penalty scored)		(penalty scored) Aílton; (penalty scored) Rybus; (penalty missed) Lebedenko; (penalty scored) Komorowski; (penalty missed) Ivanov

== Semi-finals ==
The four winners from the quarter-finals entered the semi-finals. The matches were played on 6 May 2013. The home teams in Zenit, Anzhi, Rostov and CSKA pairs were determined in a draw held on 18 April 2012. Zenit and Rostov will be home teams in their pairs due to playing more away games than Yenisey and Kuban respectively in earlier rounds. All teams are from the Russian Premier League.

7 May 2013	FC Rostov	0–2 (a.e.t.)	CSKA Moscow	Rostov-on-Don
18:00 MSK (UTC+4)		Report	Doumbia 105'; Musa 120+1'	Stadium: Olimp – 2 Attendance: 14,500; Referee: Vladislav Bezborodov (Saint Petersburg)

8 May 2013	Zenit Saint Petersburg	0–1	Anzhi Makhachkala	Saint Petersburg
19:30 MSK (UTC+4)		Report	Eto'o 61'	Stadium: Petrovsky Stadium

== Final ==
1 June 2013
13:30 UTC+4

CSKA Moscow	1–1 (a.e.t.)	Anzhi Makhachkala
Musa 7'	Report	Diarra 74'
Penalties
Mamayev (penalty scored); V. Berezutski (penalty scored); Musa (penalty missed); Vágner Love (penalty scored); Doumbia (penalty scored)	4–3	(penalty scored) Boussoufa; (penalty missed) Zhirkov; (penalty scored) Willian; (penalty missed) Jucilei; (penalty scored) Eto'o

Akhmat-Arena, Grozny
Attendance: 28,000
Referee: Aleksandr Egorov

CSKA	Anzhi

GK	35	(Russia) Igor Akinfeev (c)
DF	6	(Russia) Aleksei Berezutski
DF	14	(Russia) Kirill Nababkin
DF	24	(Russia) Vasili Berezutski
DF	42	(Russia) Georgi Schennikov
MF	3	(Sweden) Pontus Wernbloom	(red card) 87'
MF	20	(Sweden) Rasmus Elm	(substituted off) 78'
MF	7	(Japan) Keisuke Honda	(substituted off) 67'
MF	10	(Russia) Alan Dzagoev	(substituted off) 99'
FW	9	(Brazil) Vágner Love
FW	18	(Nigeria) Ahmed Musa
Substitutes:
GK	1	(Russia) Sergei Chepchugov
DF	5	(Russia) Viktor Vasin
DF	92	(Russia) Pyotr Ten
MF	11	(Chile) Mark González
MF	17	(Russia) Pavel Mamayev	(substituted on) 99'
MF	19	(Latvia) Aleksandrs Cauņa	(substituted on) 67'
FW	88	(Ivory Coast) Seydou Doumbia	(substituted on) 78'
Manager:
(Russia) Leonid Slutsky Assistant referees: Valeri Danchenko; Igor Demeshko

GK	1	(Russia) Vladimir Gabulov
DF	3	(Russia) Ali Gadzhibekov
DF	6	(Brazil) João Carlos	(substituted off) 46'
DF	13	(Russia) Rasim Tagirbekov	(substituted off) 62'
DF	37	(Brazil) Ewerton
MF	8	(Brazil) Jucilei
MF	85	(France) Lassana Diarra	(substituted off) 115'
MF	6	(Morocco) Mbark Boussoufa	(yellow card) 80'
MF	10	(Brazil) Willian
MF	18	(Russia) Yuri Zhirkov	(yellow card) 90'
FW	9	(Cameroon) Samuel Eto'o (c)
Substitutes:
GK	22	(Russia) Yevgeny Pomazan
DF	7	(Russia) Kamil Agalarov
DF	33	(Bosnia and Herzegovina) Emir Spahić
MF	14	(Russia) Oleg Shatov	(substituted on) 62'
MF	16	(Morocco) Mehdi Carcela
MF	25	(Uzbekistan) Odil Ahmedov	(substituted on) 115'
FW	19	(Ivory Coast) Lacina Traoré	(substituted on) 46'	(yellow card) 77'
Manager:
(Netherlands) Guus Hiddink

Played in the earlier stages, but were not on the final game squad:

PFC CSKA Moscow: Sergei Ignashevich (DF), (Brazil) Mário Fernandes (DF), (South Korea) Kim In-sung (MF), Ravil Netfullin (MF), (Bosnia and Herzegovina) Elvir Rahimić (MF), (Serbia) Zoran Tošić (MF), Konstantin Bazelyuk (FW), Dmitri Yefremov (FW), (Liberia) Sekou Oliseh (FW).

FC Anzhi Makhachkala: Arseniy Logashov (DF), Georgy Gabulov (MF), Nikita Burmistrov (FW), Shamil Lakhiyalov (FW), Serder Serderov (FW), Fyodor Smolov (FW).
