= 2012–13 Russian Premier League =

21st season of top-tier football league in Russia

Russian Premier League
- Season: 2012–13
- Champions: CSKA Moscow
- Relegated: Mordovia Saransk; Alania Vladikavkaz
- Champions League: CSKA Moscow; Zenit St. Petersburg
- Europa League: Anzhi Makhachkala; Spartak Moscow; Kuban Krasnodar; Rubin Kazan
- Matches: 240
- Goals: 627 (2.61 per match)
- Top goalscorer: Yura Movsisyan; Wánderson (13 goals)
- Biggest home win: Alania 5–0 Terek; Zenit 5–0 Spartak; Krasnodar 6–1 Mordovia
- Biggest away win: Krylia Sovetov 0–5 Spartak
- Highest scoring: Kuban 6–2 Volga

The 2012–13 Russian Premier League (also written as SOGAZ RFPL for sponsorship reasons) was the 21st season of the Russian football championship since the dissolution of the Soviet Union and 11th under the current Russian Premier League name. It began on 21 July 2012 and ended on 26 May 2013, with a winter break between the weekends around 13 December 2012 and 10 March 2013.

16 teams from 12 cities compete in the season, with Zenit St. Petersburg as defending champions. For the first time since 2005, no Siberian clubs take part.

This was the first season in Russian football history to be played on the basis of the autumn/spring calendar, rather than the spring/autumn schedule traditionally used in Russia due to climate conditions.

A total of sixteen teams participate in the league, the best fourteen sides of the 2011–12 season and two promoted clubs from the 2011–12 National Football League.

== Teams ==
Locations of teams in the 2012–13 Russian Premier League

The following teams are mathematically confirmed to compete in the 2012–13 season:

- Alania Vladikavkaz (promoted from the National League)
- Amkar Perm
- Anzhi Makhachkala
- CSKA Moscow
- Dynamo Moscow
- FC Krasnodar
- Krylia Sovetov Samara
- Kuban Krasnodar
- Lokomotiv Moscow
- Mordovia Saransk (promoted from the National League)
- FC Rostov
- Rubin Kazan
- Spartak Moscow
- Terek Grozny
- Volga Nizhny Novgorod
- Zenit St. Petersburg

Tom Tomsk and Spartak Nalchik were relegated at the end of the 2011–12 season after finishing the season in the bottom two places. Both teams returned to the First Division after respectively seven and six seasons in top level.

The relegated teams were replaced by 2011–12 First Division champions Mordovia Saransk and runners-up Alania Vladikavkaz. Former Russian champions Alania made their immediate return to the Premier League, while Mordovia are playing their first season at the highest football level of Russia.

=== Personnel and sponsorship ===
Team	Location	Head Coach	Captain	Kitmaker	Shirt sponsor
Alania	Vladikavkaz	(Russia) Valeri Gazzaev	(Russia) Taras Tsarikayev	Umbro	RusHydro
Amkar	Perm	(Russia) Rustem Khuzin	(Russia) Dmitri Belorukov	Puma	Perm Krai^{1}
Anzhi	Makhachkala	(Netherlands) Guus Hiddink	(Cameroon) Samuel Eto'o	adidas	Podari Zhizn
CSKA	Moscow	(Russia) Leonid Slutsky	(Russia) Igor Akinfeev	adidas	Aeroflot
Dynamo	Moscow	(Romania) Dan Petrescu	(Argentina) Leandro Fernández	adidas	VTB
Krasnodar	Krasnodar	(Serbia) Slavoljub Muslin	(Belarus) Alyaksandr Martynovich	Kappa	Home Credit Bank
Krylia Sovetov	Samara	(Russia) Gadzhi Gadzhiyev	(Russia) Ivan Taranov	Umbro	Samara Oblast^{1}
Kuban	Krasnodar	(Belarus) Leonid Kuchuk	(Russia) Vladislav Kulik	Nike	RGMK
Lokomotiv	Moscow	(Croatia) Slaven Bilić	(Brazil) Guilherme	Puma	RZD
Mordovia	Saransk	(Romania) Dorinel Munteanu	(Russia) Evgeni Aldonin	adidas	MAGMA
Rostov	Rostov-on-Don	(Montenegro) Miodrag Božović	(Croatia) Stipe Pletikosa	Joma	Rostov Oblast
Rubin	Kazan	(Turkmenistan) Kurban Berdyev	(Turkey) Gökdeniz Karadeniz	Umbro	TAIF
Spartak	Moscow	(Russia) Valeri Karpin	(Russia) Sergei Parshivlyuk	Nike	Lukoil
Terek	Grozny	(Russia) Yuri Krasnozhan	(Russia) Rizvan Utsiyev	adidas	AK
Volga	Nizhny Novgorod	(Ukraine) Yuriy Kalitvintsev	(Russia) Ruslan Adzhindzhal	Puma	MRSK Center and Volga Region
Zenit	St. Petersburg	(Italy) Luciano Spalletti	(Russia) Roman Shirokov	Nike	Gazprom

1. On the back of number.

=== Managerial changes ===
Team	Outgoing	Manner	Date	Table	Incoming	Date	Table
Lokomotiv	(Portugal) José Couceiro	Contract expired	14 May 2012	Pre-season	(Croatia) Slaven Bilić	14 May 2012	Pre-season
Volga	(Russia) Dmitri Cheryshev	Sacked	7 June 2012	Pre-season	(Russia) Gadzhi Gadzhiyev	7 June 2012	Pre-season
Spartak	(Russia) Valery Karpin	Resigned	10 June 2012	Pre-season	(Spain) Unai Emery	10 June 2012	Pre-season
Amkar	(Montenegro) Miodrag Božović	Resigned	11 June 2012	Pre-season	(Russia) Rustem Khuzin	11 June 2012	Pre-season
Rostov	(Russia) Anatoly Baidachny	Sacked	11 June 2012	Pre-season	(Montenegro) Miodrag Božović	11 June 2012	Pre-season
Dynamo	(Russia) Sergei Silkin	Resigned	6 August 2012	16th	(Russia) Dmitri Khokhlov (caretaker)	6 August 2012	16th
Kuban	(Romania) Dan Petrescu	Resigned	14 August 2012	8th	(Russia) Yuri Krasnozhan	16 August 2012	8th
Dynamo	(Russia) Dmitri Khokhlov (caretaker)	Caretaker spell over	17 August 2012	16th	(Romania) Dan Petrescu	17 August 2012	16th
Alania	(Russia) Vladimir Gazzayev	Resigned	14 November 2012	15th	(Russia) Valery Gazzaev	14 November 2012	15th
Krylia Sovetov	(Russia) Andrey Kobelev	Resigned	15 November 2012	12th	(Russia) Aleksandr Tsygankov (caretaker)	15 November 2012	12th
Mordovia	(Russia) Fyodor Shcherbachenko	Mutual agreement	19 November 2012	16th	(Russia) Vladimir Bibikov (caretaker)	19 November 2012	16th
Spartak	(Spain) Unai Emery	Sacked	25 November 2012	7th	(Russia) Valery Karpin (caretaker; from 13 Dec 2012 – permanent)	26 November 2012	7th
Mordovia	(Russia) Vladimir Bibikov (caretaker)	Caretaker spell over	28 December 2012	16th	(Romania) Dorinel Munteanu	28 December 2012	16th
Kuban	(Russia) Yuri Krasnozhan	Sacked	8 January 2013	4th	(Belarus) Leonid Kuchuk	9 January 2013	4th
Volga	(Russia) Gadzhi Gadzhiev	Resigned	19 January 2013	13th	(Ukraine) Yuriy Kalitvintsev	19 January 2013	13th
Krylia Sovetov	(Russia) Aleksandr Tsygankov (caretaker)	Caretaker spell over	27 January 2013	14th	(Russia) Gadzhi Gadzhiyev	27 January 2013	14th
Terek	(Russia) Stanislav Cherchesov	Contract expired	26 May 2013	8th	(Russia) Yuri Krasnozhan	26 May 2013	8th

Last updated: 26 May 2013

== Tournament format and regulations ==
=== Basics ===
The 16 teams played a round-robin tournament whereby each team plays each one of the other teams twice, once at home and once away. Thus, a total of 240 matches was played, with 30 matches played by each team.

=== Promotion and relegation ===
The teams that finish 15th and 16th will be relegated to the FNL, while the top two FNL teams will be promoted to the Premier League for the 2013/14 season.

The 13th and 14th Premier League teams will play the 4th and 3rd FNL teams respectively in two playoff games with the winner securing a Premier League spot for 2013/14 (see paragraph 4.5.1 in the league regulations).

=== Junior teams ===
According to long-standing practice, a tournament of junior teams will be held in parallel with the championship. The age limit for junior teams' players for this season is yet to be decided. Each club will be allowed to field no more than 3 field players and 1 goalkeeper older than the age limit.

=== Foreign players ===
As of 4 July, a team will be allowed to have 7 foreign (non-Russian nationals) players on the pitch at the same time, unlike the previous season when the limit was 6 foreigners per team. The new rule will run until 2017.

== Season events ==
=== Dynamo – Zenit game ===
On 17 November 2012, the game in which Dynamo Moscow was hosting Zenit St. Petersburg at Arena Khimki was abandoned at the 37th minute with Dynamo leading 1–0 through a free kick goal by Vladimir Granat when a firecracker thrown from the stands hit Dynamo goalkeeper Anton Shunin. Shunin was taken to the hospital where he was diagnosed with the chemical burns of his corneas and eyelids, conjunctivitis, and otitis of his right ear with partial loss of hearing. Dynamo insisted that the game should be awarded to them. Zenit's general director Mikhail Mitrofanov suggested that Zenit might drop out of the Russian league altogether if the game is awarded to Dynamo. According to the police, the main suspect is a female fan who was arrested after the game. The criminal investigation was opened on the charge of hooliganism. On 22 November, Russian Football Union's Control-Disciplinary Committee awarded the game to Dynamo with a score of 3–0 and fined both clubs. Dynamo had to play their next home game (against Rubin Kazan) behind closed doors and Zenit had to play their next 2 home games (against CSKA Moscow and Anzhi Makhachkala) behind closed doors as well. Yellow cards received by Bruno Alves and Roman Shirokov before the game was abandoned still count for disciplinary purposes. Shunin did not play in the remaining 3 games of 2012. Zenit only gained 2 points in their behind closed doors games, Dynamo won their behind closed doors game. Zenit filed an appeal for that decision with the Court of Arbitration for Sport, which heard their case on 9 May 2013. The appeal was denied on 14 May 2013.

== League table ==
Pos	Team	Pld	W	D	L	GF	GA	GD	Pts	Qualification or relegation
1	CSKA Moscow (C)	30	20	4	6	49	25	+24	64	Qualification for the Champions League group stage
2	Zenit St. Petersburg	30	18	8	4	53	25	+28	62	Qualification for the Champions League third qualifying round
3	Anzhi Makhachkala	30	15	8	7	45	34	+11	53	Qualification for the Europa League group stage
4	Spartak Moscow	30	15	6	9	51	39	+12	51	Qualification to Europa League play-off round
5	Kuban Krasnodar	30	14	9	7	48	28	+20	51	Qualification for the Europa League third qualifying round
6	Rubin Kazan	30	15	5	10	39	27	+12	50	Qualification for the Europa League second qualifying round
7	Dynamo Moscow	30	14	6	10	41	34	+7	48 (Note: Dynamo Moscow ahead of Terek Grozny on head-to-head points; Dynamo Moscow–Terek Grozny 1–2, Terek Grozny–Dynamo Moscow 1–2.)	
8	Terek Grozny	30	14	6	10	38	40	−2	48	
9	Lokomotiv Moscow	30	12	7	11	39	36	+3	43	
10	Krasnodar	30	12	6	12	45	39	+6	42	
11	Amkar Perm	30	7	8	15	34	51	−17	29 (Note: Amkar Perm ahead of Volga Nizhny Novgorod and Rostov on head-to-head points; Amkar Perm: 7 pts, Volga Nizhny Novgorod: 5 pts, Rostov: 4 pts.)	
12	Volga Nizhny Novgorod	30	7	8	15	28	46	−18	29	
13	Rostov (O)	30	7	8	15	30	41	−11	29	Qualification for the Relegation play-offs
14	Krylia Sovetov Samara (O)	30	7	7	16	31	52	−21	28	Qualification for the Relegation play-offs
15	Mordovia Saransk (R)	30	5	5	20	30	57	−27	20	Relegation to Football National League
16	Alania Vladikavkaz (R)	30	4	7	19	26	53	−27	19	Relegation to Football National League

Source: Russian Premier League
Rules for classification: 1) points; 2) number of wins; 3) head-to-head points; 4) number of head-to-head wins; 5) head-to-head goal difference; 6) number of head-to-head goals scored; 7) number of head-to-head away goals scored; 8) goal difference; 9) number of goals scored; 10) number of away goals scored; 11) position in the 2011–12 season (only used until all the regularly scheduled games have been played); 11) extra play-off game or tournament between the teams in question.
(C) Champions; (O) Play-off winners; (R) Relegated

=== Results ===
Home \ Away	ALA	AMK	ANZ	CSK	DYN	KRA	KRY	KUB	LOK	MOR	ROS	RUB	SPA	TER	VNN	ZEN
Alania Vladikavkaz		1–1	0–1	0–4	1–0	2–3	2–2	2–1	0–1	3–1	0–0	0–2	1–2	5–0	0–2	2–3
Amkar Perm	5–1		1–2	3–1	1–1	2–2	0–2	0–3	2–4	0–0	3–2	1–1	1–3	0–1	3–2	0–0
Anzhi Makhachkala	0–0	1–0		2–0	3–3	5–2	1–1	2–1	2–1	4–2	0–0	2–1	2–1	3–1	2–1	1–1
CSKA Moscow	2–0	3–0	1–0		0–2	1–0	3–0	0–0	2–1	2–1	1–0	2–0	2–2	1–0	2–0	1–3
Dynamo Moscow	2–0	3–2	0–2	0–0		1–1	1–0	1–2	1–0	3–1	1–0	3–0	0–4	1–2	0–0	3–0
Krasnodar	2–0	2–1	4–0	0–1	2–0		0–3	2–1	3–1	6–1	0–0	2–1	0–1	3–0	2–0	0–2
Krylia Sovetov Samara	2–1	0–2	1–2	0–2	1–2	2–2		2–1	0–1	0–2	0–2	3–1	0–5	1–1	0–1	2–2
Kuban Krasnodar	0–0	4–0	1–0	1–3	1–1	2–1	4–1		0–0	1–0	1–0	0–0	2–2	2–1	6–2	2–2
Lokomotiv Moscow	2–2	1–2	1–1	1–4	2–3	3–2	2–0	0–1		2–1	3–1	1–0	2–1	1–1	0–1	0–1
Mordovia Saransk	1–1	1–1	2–0	0–3	1–2	0–0	2–3	0–3	2–3		3–0	1–3	2–1	1–1	1–3	0–3
Rostov	3–1	3–0	2–2	3–0	1–0	2–3	1–2	0–2	0–0	2–0		0–4	1–0	0–3	1–2	1–1
Rubin Kazan	3–1	0–1	2–1	2–0	2–0	2–0	2–0	1–0	2–0	2–1	1–1		0–1	1–2	0–0	1–0
Spartak Moscow	2–0	2–0	2–0	0–2	1–5	2–0	1–1	2–2	0–0	2–0	3–1	2–1		3–1	2–1	2–4
Terek Grozny	1–0	2–1	1–0	1–2	1–2	1–0	4–1	2–2	0–3	2–1	2–1	0–0	2–1		2–0	0–3
Volga Nizhny Novgorod	1–0	1–1	0–3	2–3	1–0	1–1	1–1	0–2	0–2	0–2	1–1	1–2	1–1	1–1		1–2
Zenit St. Petersburg	4–0	2–0	1–1	1–1	2–0	1–0	1–0	1–0	1–1	1–0	2–1	1–2	5–0	0–2	3–1	

Source: Russian Premier League
Legend: Blue = home team win; Yellow = draw; Red = away team win.

== Statistics ==
=== Top goalscorers ===
#	Scorer	Goals	Team
1	(Armenia) Yura Movsisyan	13	Krasnodar/Spartak
1	(Brazil) Wánderson	13	Krasnodar
2	(Ivory Coast) Lacina Traoré	12	Anzhi
3	(Nigeria) Ahmed Musa	11	CSKA
3	(Russia) Ruslan Mukhametshin	11	Mordovia
4	(Cameroon) Samuel Eto'o	10	Anzhi
4	(Russia) Aleksandr Kerzhakov	10	Zenit
4	(Russia) Aleksandr Kokorin	10	Dynamo
4	(Germany) Kevin Kurányi	10	Dynamo
4	(Senegal) Dame N'Doye	10	Lokomotiv

=== Hat-tricks ===
Player	For	Against	Result	Date
(Czech Republic) Jan Holenda	Rostov	Alania	3–1	25 August 2012
(Armenia) Yura Movsisyan	Spartak	Terek	3–1	10 March 2013
(Brazil) Wánderson	Krasnodar	Anzhi	4–0	31 March 2013
(Netherlands) Royston Drenthe	Alania	Mordovia	3–1	15 April 2013
(Brazil) Hulk	Zenit	Alania	4–0	4 May 2013

== Relegation play-offs ==
=== First leg ===
30 May 2013
20:30 MSK (UTC+4)

Rostov	2–0	SKA-Energiya Khabarovsk
Guélor 43'; Cociș 90'

Olimp – 2, Rostov-on-Don
Attendance: 8,500
Referee: Sergey Karasev

30 May 2013
18:30 MSK (UTC+4)

Krylia Sovetov Samara	2–0	Spartak Nalchik
Caballero 21' (pen.), 42' (pen.)

Metallurg Stadium, Samara
Attendance: 27,654
Referee: Vladislav Bezborodov

=== Second leg ===
3 June 2013
12:00 MSK (UTC+4)

SKA-Energiya Khabarovsk	0–1	Rostov
		Lazović 66'

Lenin Stadium, Khabarovsk
Attendance: 12,200
Referee: Maxim Layushkin

3 June 2013
19:00 MSK (UTC+4)

Spartak Nalchik	2–5	Krylia Sovetov Samara
Siradze 86', 90'		Angbwa 33', 71'; Portnyagin 55', 90'; Makhmudov 78'

Spartak Stadium, Nalchik
Attendance: 11,000
Referee: Alexey Nikolaev

== Awards ==
=== Monthly awards ===
Month	Premier League Manager of the Month		Premier League Player of the Month		Reference
Month	Manager	Club	Player	Club	Reference
August			(Armenia) Yura Movsisyan	Krasnodar	
September			(Cameroon) Samuel Eto'o	Anzhi	
October			(Russia) Aleksandr Kokorin	Dynamo	
November			(Germany) Kevin Kurányi	Dynamo	
March	(Turkmenistan) Kurban Berdyev	Rubin	(Brazil) Vágner Love	CSKA	
April	(Turkmenistan) Kurban Berdyev	Rubin	(Russia) Dmitri Kombarov	Spartak	
May	(Russia) Leonid Slutsky	CSKA	(Brazil) Vágner Love	CSKA	

=== Top 33 ===
On 11 June 2013 Russian Football Union named its list of 33 top players:

Goalkeepers

1. (Russia) Igor Akinfeev (CSKA)
2. (Russia) Vladimir Gabulov (Anzhi)
3. (Russia) Aleksandr Belenov (Kuban)

Right backs

1. (Russia) Aleksandr Anyukov (Zenit)
2. (Russia) Mário Fernandes (CSKA)
3. (Russia) Renat Yanbayev (Lokomotiv)

Right-centre backs

1. (Russia) Vasili Berezutski (CSKA)
2. (France) Christopher Samba (Anzhi)
3. (Argentina) Leandro Fernández (Dynamo)

Left-centre backs

1. (Russia) Dmitri Kombarov (Spartak)
2. (Italy) Salvatore Bocchetti (Spartak)
3. (Belgium) Nicolas Lombaerts (Zenit)

Left backs

1. (Russia) Sergei Ignashevich (CSKA)
2. (Argentina) Cristian Ansaldi (Rubin)
3. (Russia) Andrey Yeshchenko (Anzhi)

Defensive midfielders

1. (Russia) Igor Denisov (Zenit)
2. (France) Lassana Diarra (Anzhi)
3. (Sweden) Rasmus Elm (CSKA)

Right wingers

1. (Brazil) Hulk (Zenit)
2. (Serbia) Zoran Tošić (CSKA)
3. (Turkey) Gökdeniz Karadeniz (Rubin)

Central midfielders

1. (Russia) Roman Shirokov (Zenit)
2. (Russia) Roman Eremenko (Kuban)
3. (Russia) Denis Glushakov (Lokomotiv)

Left wingers

1. (Russia) Alan Dzagoev (CSKA)
2. (Russia) Yuri Zhirkov (Anzhi)
3. (Russia) Aleksei Ionov (Kuban)

Right forwards

1. (Cameroon) Samuel Eto'o (Anzhi)
2. (Nigeria) Ahmed Musa (CSKA)
3. (Armenia) Yura Movsisyan (Spartak)

Left forwards

1. (Russia) Aleksandr Kokorin (Dynamo)
2. (Brazil) Vágner Love (CSKA)
3. (Russia) Aleksandr Kerzhakov (Zenit)

=== Annual awards ===
==== Russian Manager of the Season ====
CSKA Moscow manager Leonid Slutsky, received the Russian Manager of the Season.

==== Russian Player of the Season ====
The Russian Player of the Season was awarded to Igor Akinfeev.

==== Russian Referee of the Season ====
The Russian Referee of the Season was awarded to Aleksandr Egorov.

=== Attendances ===
==== Top 15 attendances (single match) ====
Rank	Game	Date	Home team	Away team	Stadium	Attendance
1	25	21.04.2013	CSKA	Spartak	Luzhniki Stadium	67,740
2	11	07.10.2012	Spartak	CSKA	Luzhniki Stadium	54,228
3	30	26.05.2013	Kuban	Anzhi	Kuban Stadium	31,743
4	26	28.04.2013	Kuban	Zenit	Kuban Stadium	30,359
5	8	15.09.2012	Kuban	Spartak	Kuban Stadium	29,870
6	1	21.07.2012	Alania	Spartak	Spartak Stadium	28,500
7	9	22.09.2012	Terek	Lokomotiv	Akhmat-Arena	28,102
8	7	02.09.2012	Lokomotiv	Spartak	Lokomotiv Stadium	27,269
9	23	07.04.2013	Kuban	Rubin	Kuban Stadium	26,345
10	29	19.05.2013	Krylia Sovetov	Rubin	Metallurg Stadium	26,345
11	21	17.03.2013	Anzhi	Krylia Sovetov	Anzhi-Arena	26,200
12	28	12.05.2013	Lokomotiv	CSKA	Lokomotiv Stadium	24,846
13	11	05.10.2012	Terek	Rostov	Akhmat-Arena	24,700
14	15	10.11.2012	Kuban	CSKA	Kuban Stadium	24,680
15	25	21.04.2013	Anzhi	Dynamo	Anzhi-Arena	24,500

==== Russian Premier League attendances (average) ====
Rank	Team	Total	Matches	Average
1	Kuban	313,997	15	20,933
2	Terek	296,518	15	19,768
3	Zenit	253,747	15(13+2*)	19,519
4	Spartak	262,384	15	17,492
5	Anzhi	258,100	15	17,207
6	CSKA	224,733	15	14,982
7	Krylia Sovetov	205,484	15	13,699
8	Alania	200,100	15	13,340
9	Lokomotiv	192,923	15	12,862
10	Krasnodar	158,964	15	10,598
11	Rostov	148,165	15	9,878
12	Amkar	144,350	15	9,623
13	Rubin	141,320	15	9,421
14	Dynamo	112,859	15(14+1*)	8,061
15	Volga	105,099	15	7,507
16	Mordovia	105,343	15	7,023

Last updated: 26 May 2013

== Medal squads ==
(league appearances and goals listed in brackets)

1. PFC CSKA Moscow

Goalkeepers: Igor Akinfeev (29), Sergei Chepchugov (1)
Defenders: Vasili Berezutski (29), (Brazil) Mário Fernandes (28), Sergei Ignashevich (28), Kirill Nababkin (19), Georgi Shchennikov (18), Aleksei Berezutski (5), Pyotr Ten (1).
Midfielders: (Sweden) Rasmus Elm (26 / 5), (Sweden) Pontus Wernbloom (26 / 4), (Serbia) Zoran Tošić (25 / 3), (Latvia) Aleksandrs Cauņa (25 / 3), Alan Dzagoev (24 / 7), (Japan) Keisuke Honda (23 / 7), Pavel Mamayev (19 / 1), (Chile) Mark González (11), (Liberia) Sekou Oliseh (11), Ravil Netfullin (8).
Forwards: (Nigeria) Ahmed Musa (28 / 11), (Brazil) Vágner Love (9 / 5), (Ivory Coast) Seydou Doumbia (7 / 3), Dmitri Yefremov (3), (Czech Republic) Tomáš Necid (1).

Manager: Leonid Slutsky.

Transferred out during the season: (Liberia) Sekou Oliseh (on loan to (Greece) PAOK).

2. FC Zenit St. Petersburg

Goalkeepers: Vyacheslav Malafeev (26), Yegor Baburin (4), (Belarus) Yuri Zhevnov (2).
Defenders: (Slovakia) Tomáš Hubočan (24), Aleksandr Anyukov (22 / 1), (Belgium) Nicolas Lombaerts (22), (Portugal) Bruno Alves (21 / 1), (Italy) Domenico Criscito (12 / 2), Renat Yanbayev (11 / 1), (Portugal) Luís Neto (9 / 1), (Serbia) Aleksandar Luković (9), (Serbia) Milan Rodić (4), (Denmark) Michael Lumb (1), Igor Cheminava (1).
Midfielders: Konstantin Zyryanov (27 / 6), Roman Shirokov (25 / 5), Viktor Fayzulin (24 / 6), Vladimir Bystrov (24 / 3), Igor Denisov (23), (Belgium) Axel Witsel (19 / 4), Sergei Semak (16 / 2), (Portugal) Danny (12 / 2), Pavel Mogilevets (2), Alexey Yevseyev (1), Vyacheslav Zinkov (1), Danila Yashchuk (1).
Forwards: Aleksandr Kerzhakov (23 / 10), (Brazil) Hulk (18 / 7), Aleksandr Bukharov (9 / 1), Maksim Kanunnikov (9 / 1), (Serbia) Luka Đorđević (7), Aleksei Gasilin (1).

Manager: (Italy) Luciano Spalletti.

Transferred out during the season: Renat Yanbayev (end of loan from Lokomotiv Moscow), Maksim Kanunnikov (to Amkar Perm), (Denmark) Michael Lumb (to (Germany) Bochum).

3. FC Anzhi Makhachkala

Goalkeepers: Vladimir Gabulov (27), Yevgeny Pomazan (5).
Defenders: (Brazil) João Carlos (25 / 2), Rasim Tagirbekov (22 / 2), Arseniy Logashov (19), (Republic of the Congo) Christopher Samba (17 / 2), Kamil Agalarov (14), Ali Gadzhibekov (8), (Bosnia and Herzegovina) Emir Spahić (7 / 1), (Brazil) Ewerton (7), Andrey Yeshchenko (2).
Midfielders: (Brazil) Jucilei (27), (Morocco) Mbark Boussoufa (26 / 4), Oleg Shatov (24 / 3), Yuri Zhirkov (23 / 2), (Morocco) Mehdi Carcela (20 / 1), (Uzbekistan) Odil Ahmedov (17 / 1), (France) Lassana Diarra (14), (Brazil) Willian (7 / 1), Georgy Gabulov (7 / 1), Sharif Mukhammad (3), Aleksei Ivanov (1).
Forwards: (Cameroon) Samuel Eto'o (25 / 10), (Ivory Coast) Lacina Traoré (24 / 12), Fyodor Smolov (15), Shamil Lakhiyalov (8), Serder Serderov (4), Nikita Burmistrov (4).

Manager: (Netherlands) Guus Hiddink.

Transferred out during the season: (Republic of the Congo) Christopher Samba (to (England) Queens Park Rangers), Shamil Lakhiyalov (to Krylia Sovetov Samara), Georgy Gabulov (to Alania Vladikavkaz), Nikita Burmistrov (on loan to Amkar Perm), Aleksei Ivanov (to Mordovia Saransk).

== Attendances ==
Rank	Club	Average
1	Kuban	20,934
2	Terek	19,505
3	Anji	17,927
4	Spartak Moscow	17,612
5	Zenit	16,916
6	PFC CSKA	14,931
7	Krylia Sovetov	13,699
8	Alania	13,473
9	Lokomotiv Moscow	12,862
10	Krasnodar	11,127
11	Rostov	10,111
12	Rubin	10,103
13	Amkar	9,623
14	Dynamo Moscow	7,516
15	Volga	7,507
16	Mordovia	7,032
