= Dmitry Yefremov (footballer, born 1995) =

Russian footballer

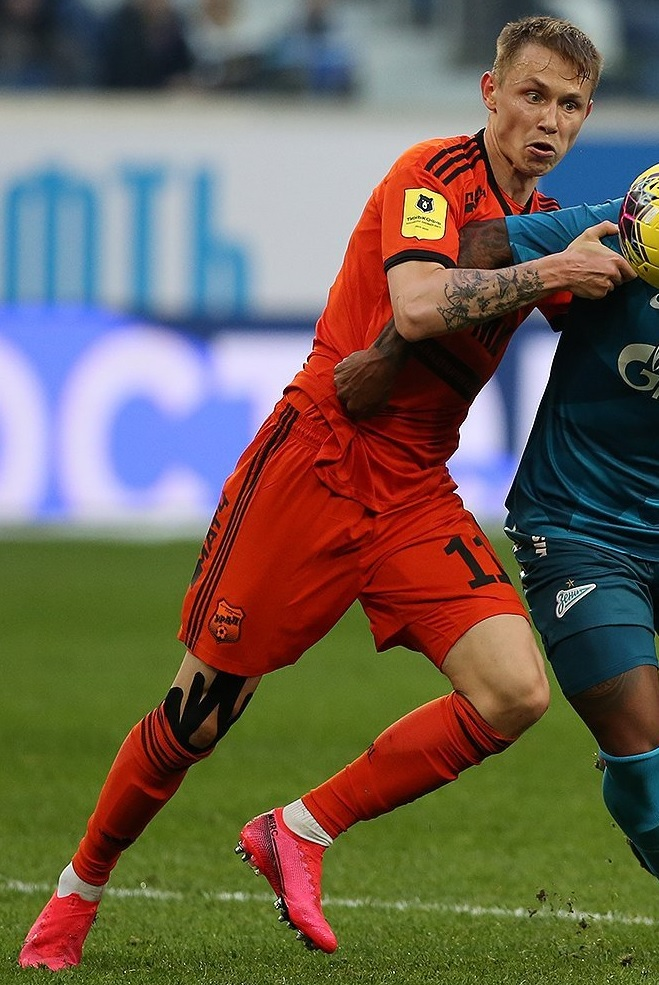
- Yefremov with Ural Yekaterinburg in 2020

Personal information
- Full name: Dmitry Vladislavovich Yefremov
- Date of birth: 1 April 1995 (age 31)
- Place of birth: Ulyanovsk, Russia
- Height: 1.80 m (5 ft 11 in)
- Position: Midfielder

Youth career
- Konoplyov football academy

Senior career*
Years	Team	Apps	(Gls)
2011–2012	Akademiya Tolyatti	16	(3)
2013–2019	CSKA Moscow	37	(0)
2015–2016	→ Slovan Liberec (loan)	16	(0)
2016–2018	→ Orenburg (loan)	49	(2)
2020	Ural Yekaterinburg	18	(0)
2021	Krylia Sovetov Samara	4	(1)
2021–2022	Akron Tolyatti	16	(3)
2022–2023	Volga Ulyanovsk	20	(2)
2023–2024	Tekstilshchik Ivanovo	18	(1)

International career^{‡}
2010–2011	Russia U-16	6	(0)
2011–2012	Russia U-17	10	(1)
2013	Russia U-18	6	(3)
2012–2014	Russia U-19	11	(3)
2013–2016	Russia U-21	16	(0)
2015	Russia	1	(0)
- * Club domestic league appearances and goals as of 8 June 2024 ‡ National team caps and goals as of 11 October 2016

Dmitry Vladislavovich Yefremov (Russian: Дмитрий Владиславович Ефремов; born 1 April 1995) is a Russian football player.

== Club career ==
Yefremov made his debut in the Russian Second Division for Akademiya Tolyatti on 24 April 2012 in a game against Gornyak Uchaly.

He made his Russian Premier League debut for CSKA Moscow on 9 March 2013 in a game against Krylia Sovetov Samara.

On 31 August 2015, Yefremov joined Slovan Liberec on a season-long loan deal. On 5 July 2017, Yefremov re-joined Orenburg on a season-long loan deal.

On 17 December 2019 he left CSKA upon the expiration of his contract.

On 18 February 2020, Yefremov signed for Ural Yekaterinburg.

On 21 February 2021 he moved to Krylia Sovetov Samara. On 25 July 2021, his contract with Krylia Sovetov was terminated by mutual consent.

== International ==
Yefremov made his debut for the Russia national football team on 31 March 2015 in a friendly game against Kazakhstan.

== Honours ==
CSKA Moscow

- Russian Premier League (2): 2012–13, 2013–14
- Russian Cup (1): 2012–13
- Russian Super Cup (2): 2013, 2018

== Career statistics ==
As of 8 June 2024

Club	Season	League			Cup		Continental		Other		Total	
Club	Season	Division	Apps	Goals	Apps	Goals	Apps	Goals	Apps	Goals	Apps	Goals
Akademiya Tolyatti	2011–12	Russian Second League	6	1	–		–		–		6	1
Akademiya Tolyatti	2012–13	Russian Second League	10	2	1	0	–		–		11	2
Akademiya Tolyatti	Total		16	3	1	0	0	0	0	0	17	3
CSKA Moscow	2012–13	Russian Premier League	3	0	1	0	–		–		4	0
CSKA Moscow	2013–14	Russian Premier League	7	0	2	0	0	0	0	0	9	0
CSKA Moscow	2014–15	Russian Premier League	10	0	3	0	5 (Note: Appearances in UEFA Champions League)	0	1 (Note: Appearance in Russian Super Cup)	0	19	0
CSKA Moscow	2015–16	Russian Premier League	1	0	–		0	0	–		1	0
CSKA Moscow	2018–19	Russian Premier League	14	0	1	0	3	0	1	0	19	0
CSKA Moscow	2019–20	Russian Premier League	2	0	0	0	0	0	–		2	0
CSKA Moscow	Total		37	0	7	0	8	0	2	0	54	0
Slovan Liberec (loan)	2015–16	Czech First League	16	0	3	0	5 (Note: Appearances in UEFA Europa League)	1	–		24	1
Orenburg (loan)	2016–17	Russian Premier League	20	1	1	0	–		0	0	21	1
Orenburg (loan)	2017–18	Russian First League	29	1	1	1	–		–		30	2
Orenburg (loan)	Total		49	2	2	1	0	0	0	0	51	3
Ural Yekaterinburg	2019–20	Russian Premier League	8	0	2	0	–		3 (Note: Appearances in the FNL Cup)	0	13	0
Ural Yekaterinburg	2020–21	Russian Premier League	10	0	1	0	–		–		11	0
Ural Yekaterinburg	Total		18	0	3	0	0	0	3	0	24	0
Krylia Sovetov Samara	2020–21	Russian First League	4	1	1	0	–		–		5	1
Krylia Sovetov Samara	2021–22	Russian Premier League	0	0	–		–		–		0	0
Krylia Sovetov Samara	Total		4	1	1	0	0	0	0	0	5	1
Akron Tolyatti	2021–22	Russian First League	16	3	–		–		–		16	3
Volga Ulyanovsk	2022–23	Russian First League	20	2	3	2	–		–		23	4
Volga Ulyanovsk	2023–24	Russian Second League A	0	0	–		–		–		0	0
Volga Ulyanovsk	Total		20	2	3	2	0	0	0	0	23	4
Tekstilshchik Ivanovo	2023–24	Russian Second League A	18	1	1	0	–		–		19	1
Career total			194	12	21	3	13	1	5	0	233	16
