= Arseny Logashov =

Russian footballer

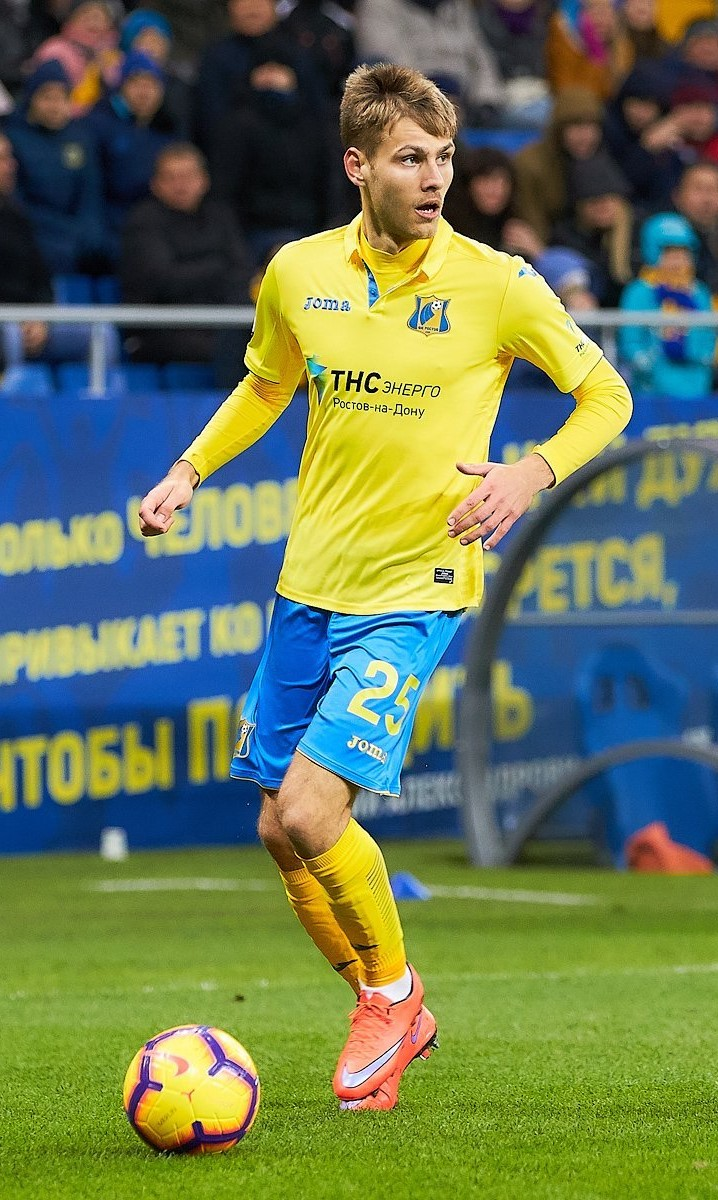
- Logashov with Rostov in 2018

Personal information
- Full name: Arseny Maksimovich Logashov
- Date of birth: 20 August 1991 (age 35)
- Place of birth: Kursk, Russian SFSR
- Height: 1.84 m (6 ft 0 in)
- Position: Full-back

Senior career*
Years	Team	Apps	(Gls)
2008	Sportakademklub Moscow	18	(0)
2009–2011	Khimki	43	(0)
2011–2013	Anzhi Makhachkala	30	(0)
2011	→ Fakel Voronezh (loan)	14	(0)
2013–2016	Lokomotiv Moscow	15	(0)
2013–2014	→ Rostov (loan)	23	(1)
2017	Tosno	5	(0)
2017–2018	Baltika Kaliningrad	36	(0)
2018–2021	Rostov	27	(0)
2020–2021	→ Khimki (loan)	7	(0)
2021	Kuban Krasnodar	2	(0)

International career
2009–2010	Russia U-19	4	(0)
2011–2013	Russia U-21	8	(0)
2012	Russia	1	(0)
- * Club domestic league appearances and goals

Arseny Maksimovich Logashov (Russian: Арсений Максимович Логашов; born 20 August 1991) is a Russian former professional footballer who played as a centre-back or right-back.

== Club career ==
Logashov made his professional debut in the Russian First Division in 2008 for Sportakademklub Moscow.

On 3 February 2017, he moved to Tosno, signing a contract until the end of the 2016–17 season.

On 11 June 2017, Logashov signed a 2-year contract with Baltika Kaliningrad.

On 20 June 2018, he returned to Rostov, signing a 3-year contract. On 16 October 2020 he returned to Khimki on loan. He left Rostov on 3 July 2021.

== International career ==
He made his senior national team debut on 15 August 2012 in a friendly against Ivory Coast.

== Career statistics ==
Club	Season	League			Cup		Continental		Total	
Club	Season	Division	Apps	Goals	Apps	Goals	Apps	Goals	Apps	Goals
Sportakademklub Moscow	2008	Russian First League	18	0	1	0	–		19	0
Khimki	2009	Russian Premier League	6	0	–		–		6	0
Khimki	2010	Russian First League	20	0	0	0	–		20	0
Khimki	2011–12	Russian First League	17	0	2	0	–		19	0
Khimki	Total		43	0	2	0	0	0	45	0
Anzhi Makhachkala	2011–12	Russian Premier League	9	0	–		–		9	0
Anzhi Makhachkala	2012–13	Russian Premier League	19	0	3	0	10 (Note: Appearances in the UEFA Europa League)	0	32	0
Anzhi Makhachkala	2013–14	Russian Premier League	2	0	–		–		2	0
Anzhi Makhachkala	Total		30	0	3	0	10	0	43	0
Fakel Voronezh (loan)	2011–12	Russian First League	14	0	1	0	–		15	0
Rostov (loan)	2013–14	Russian Premier League	23	1	3	0	–		26	1
Lokomotiv Moscow	2014–15	Russian Premier League	7	0	3	0	0	0	10	0
Lokomotiv Moscow	2015–16	Russian Premier League	8	0	2	0	1	0	11	0
Lokomotiv Moscow	2016–17	Russian Premier League	0	0	0	0	–		0	0
Lokomotiv Moscow	Total		15	0	5	0	1	0	21	0
Tosno	2016–17	Russian First League	5	0	0	0	–		5	0
Baltika Kaliningrad	2017–18	Russian First League	36	0	1	0	–		37	0
Rostov	2018–19	Russian Premier League	13	0	4	1	–		17	1
Rostov	2019–20	Russian Premier League	10	0	2	0	–		12	0
Rostov	2020–21	Russian Premier League	4	0	–		0	0	4	0
Rostov	Total		27	0	6	1	0	0	33	1
Khimki (loan)	2020–21	Russian Premier League	7	0	1	0	–		8	0
Kuban Krasnodar	2021–22	Russian First League	2	0	0	0	–		2	0
Career total			220	1	23	1	11	0	254	2

== Honours ==
Russia U-19

- Granatkin Memorial - winner: 2009

Anzhi

- Russian Cup - runner-up: 2012-13

Rostov

- Russian Cup - winner: 2013-14

Lokomotiv Moscow

- Russian Cup - winner: 2014–15
