= Shamil Lakhiyalov =

Russian footballer and official

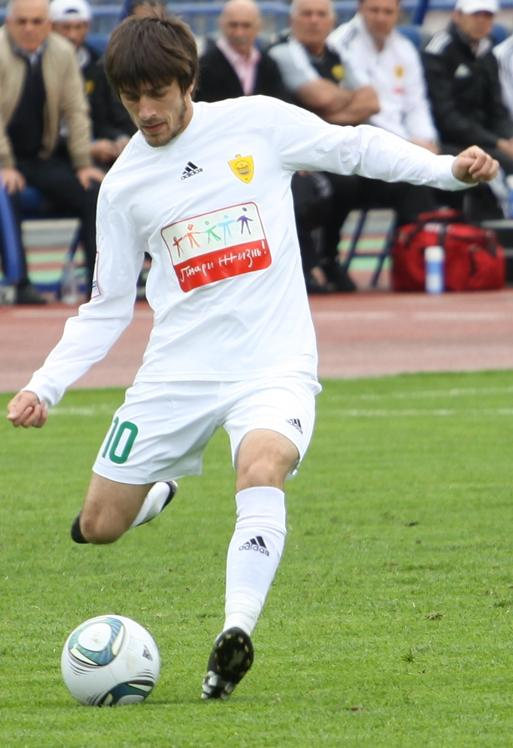
- Lakhiyalov with Anzhi in 2011

Personal information
- Full name: Shamil Gadzhialiyevich Lakhiyalov
- Date of birth: 28 October 1979 (age 47)
- Place of birth: Makhachkala, Russian SFSR
- Height: 1.75 m (5 ft 9 in)
- Position: Forward

Youth career
- Dynamo Makhachkala

Senior career*
Years	Team	Apps	(Gls)
2000–2002	Dynamo Makhachkala	95	(53)
2002	Saturn Ramenskoye	0	(0)
2003–2007	Anzhi Makhachkala	116	(35)
2007–2010	Terek Grozny	79	(21)
2011	Krasnodar	0	(0)
2011–2012	Anzhi Makhachkala	38	(4)
2013	Krylia Sovetov Samara	4	(0)
2023	Legion Makhachkala	0	(0)

Managerial career
- 2016–2025: Legion Makhachkala (president)
- * Club domestic league appearances and goals

Shamil Gadzhialiyevich Lakhiyalov (Russian: Шамиль Гаджиалиевич Лахиялов; born 28 October 1979) is a Russian football official and a former player of Avar ethnicity.

== Club career ==
He made his Russian Premier League debut for Terek Grozny on 14 March 2008 in a game against Krylia Sovetov Samara.

In early 2011 he signed a contract with Krasnodar as a free agent, but before the league competition even started, another Russian Premier League team, Anzhi Makhachkala, bought his contract.

== Career statistics ==
Club	Season	League			Cup		Continental		Total	
Club	Season	Division	Apps	Goals	Apps	Goals	Apps	Goals	Apps	Goals
Dynamo Makhachkala	2000	Russian Second League	28	11	0	0	–		28	11
Dynamo Makhachkala	2001	Russian Second League	37	20	2	0	–		39	20
Dynamo Makhachkala	2002	Russian Second League	30	22	5	0	–		35	22
Dynamo Makhachkala	Total		95	53	7	0	0	0	102	53
Saturn Ramenskoye	2002	Russian Premier League	0	0	0	0	–		0	0
Anzhi Makhachkala	2003	Russian First League	40	9	4	2	–		44	11
Anzhi Makhachkala	2004	Russian First League	20	9	1	1	–		21	10
Anzhi Makhachkala	2005	Russian First League	24	9	0	0	–		24	9
Anzhi Makhachkala	2006	Russian First League	22	5	3	1	–		25	6
Anzhi Makhachkala	2007	Russian First League	10	3	0	0	–		10	3
Anzhi Makhachkala	Total		116	35	8	4	0	0	124	39
Terek Grozny	2007	Russian First League	12	3	0	0	–		12	3
Terek Grozny	2008	Russian Premier League	19	4	0	0	–		19	4
Terek Grozny	2009	Russian Premier League	24	11	1	0	–		25	11
Terek Grozny	2010	Russian Premier League	24	3	0	0	–		24	3
Terek Grozny	Total		79	21	1	0	0	0	80	21
Anzhi Makhachkala	2011–12	Russian Premier League	30	4	2	0	–		32	4
Anzhi Makhachkala	2012–13	Russian Premier League	8	0	2	0	7 (Note: Appearances in the UEFA Europa League)	1	17	1
Anzhi Makhachkala	Total		38	4	4	0	7	1	49	5
Krylia Sovetov Samara	2012–13	Russian Premier League	4	0	–		–		4	0
Legion Makhachkala	2022–23	Russian Second League	0	0	–		–		0	0
Career total			332	113	20	4	7	1	359	118
