= Ali Gadzhibekov =

Russian footballer

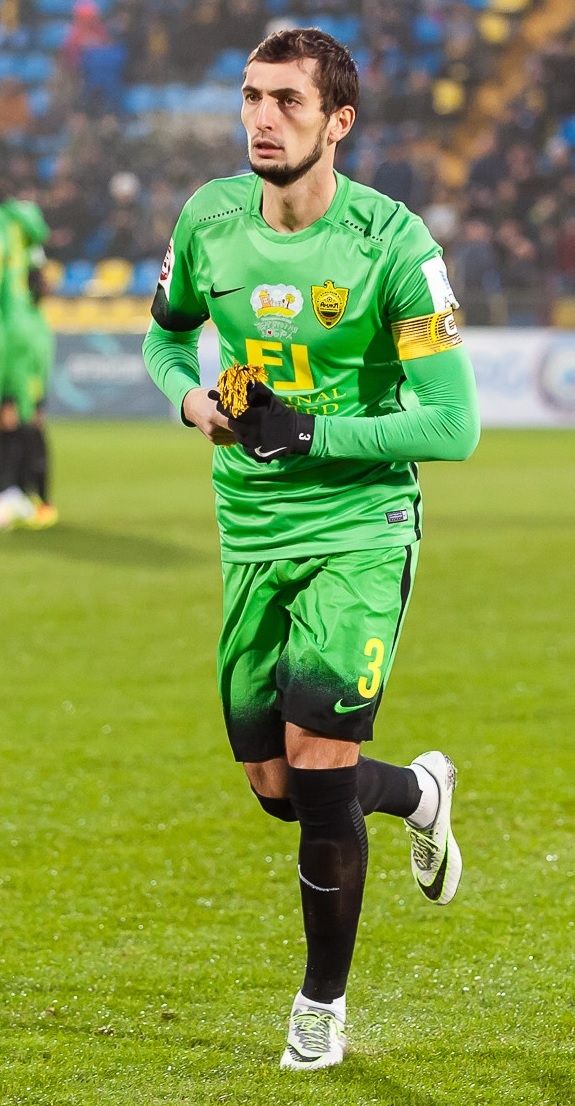
- Gadzhibekov with Anzhi in 2016

Personal information
- Full name: Ali Amrakhovich Gadzhibekov
- Date of birth: 6 August 1989 (age 37)
- Place of birth: Makhachkala, Russian SFSR
- Height: 1.85 m (6 ft 1 in)
- Position: Defender

Youth career
- 2005–2006: Anzhi-Khazar Makhachkala

Senior career*
Years	Team	Apps	(Gls)
2006–2016	Anzhi Makhachkala	169	(3)
2017–2020	Krylia Sovetov	24	(0)
2018–2019	→ Yenisey Krasnoyarsk (loan)	20	(1)
2019–2020	→ Nizhny Novgorod (loan)	14	(1)
2020–2021	Chayka Peschanokopskoye	24	(0)
2021	Legion Dynamo Makhachkala	8	(0)
2022	Aksu	12	(1)

International career
2011–2012	Russia II	5	(0)
- * Club domestic league appearances and goals

Ali Amrakhovich Gadzhibekov (Russian: Али Амрахович Гаджибеков; born 6 August 1989) is a Russian former professional footballer who played as a centre-back.

== Career ==
=== Club ===
Gadzhibekov made his professional debut in the Russian First Division in 2006 for FC Anzhi Makhachkala. He made his Russian Premier League debut for Anzhi on 4 July 2010 in a game against FC Zenit Saint Petersburg.

After 10 years with Anzhi Makhachkala, Gadzhibekov left the club in January 2017 by mutual termination of his contract, going on to sign a three-and-a-half-year contract with Krylia Sovetov on 13 January 2017.

On 20 July 2018, he signed with FC Yenisey Krasnoyarsk on loan for the 2018–19 season.

On 25 January, Aksu announced the signing of Gadzhibekov.

== Personal life ==
He is the younger brother of Albert Gadzhibekov.

== Career statistics ==
As of match played 5 December 2016

Appearances and goals by club, season and competition
Club	Season	League			National Cup		League Cup		Continental		Other		Total	
Club	Season	Division	Apps	Goals	Apps	Goals	Apps	Goals	Apps	Goals	Apps	Goals	Apps	Goals
Anzhi Makhachkala	2006	Russian First Division	1	0	0	0	-		-		-		1	0
Anzhi Makhachkala	2007	Russian First Division	11	0	0	0	-		-		-		11	0
Anzhi Makhachkala	2008	Russian First Division	2	0	1	0	-		-		-		3	0
Anzhi Makhachkala	2009	Russian First Division	1	0	0	0	-		-		-		1	0
Anzhi Makhachkala	2010	Russian Premier League	19	1	0	0	-		0	0	-		19	1
Anzhi Makhachkala	2011–12	Russian Premier League	39	0	3	1	-		-		-		42	1
Anzhi Makhachkala	2012–13	Russian Premier League	8	0	5	0	-		1	0	-		14	0
Anzhi Makhachkala	2013–14	Russian Premier League	27	0	1	0	-		7	0	-		35	0
Anzhi Makhachkala	2014–15	Russian National League	31	2	2	0	-		-		-		33	2
Anzhi Makhachkala	2015–16	Russian Premier League	20	0	1	0	-		-		1	0	22	0
Anzhi Makhachkala	2016–17	Russian Premier League	10	0	1	0	-		-		-		11	0
Anzhi Makhachkala	Total		169	3	14	1	-	-	8	0	1	0	192	4
Krylia Sovetov	2016–17	Russian Premier League	0	0	0	0	–		–		–		0	0
Career total			169	3	14	1	-	-	8	0	1	0	192	4
