= Vladimir Gabulov =

Russian footballer (born 1983)

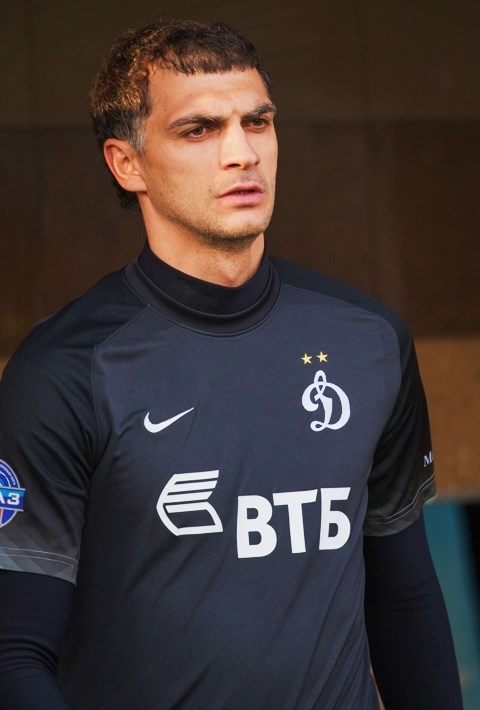
- Gabulov with Dynamo Moscow in 2014

Personal information
- Full name: Vladimir Borisovich Gabulov
- Date of birth: 19 October 1983 (age 43)
- Place of birth: Mozdok, North Ossetian ASSR, Russian SFSR, Soviet Union
- Height: 1.90 m (6 ft 3 in)
- Position: Goalkeeper

Youth career
- 1988–1999: Mozdok

Senior career*
Years	Team	Apps	(Gls)
1999–2000	Mozdok	33	(0)
2001	Dynamo Moscow	11	(0)
2001–2003	Alania Vladikavkaz	43	(0)
2004–2006	CSKA Moscow	3	(0)
2007–2008	Kuban Krasnodar	29	(0)
2008	→ Amkar Perm (loan)	10	(0)
2008–2011	Dynamo Moscow	56	(0)
2011–2013	Anzhi Makhachkala	43	(0)
2011	→ CSKA Moscow (loan)	7	(0)
2013–2016	Dynamo Moscow	65	(0)
2017	Arsenal Tula	33	(0)
2018	Club Brugge	9	(0)
Total		342	(0)

International career
2001–2005	Russia U-21	23	(0)
2007–2018	Russia	10	(0)

Managerial career
- 2020–2021: FC Olimp Khimki (chairman)
- 2021–2022: FC Khimki (general director)
- * Club domestic league appearances and goals

Vladimir Borisovich Gabulov (Russian: Владимир Борисович Габулов, IPA: [vlɐˈdʲimɪr bɐˈrʲisəvʲɪdʑ ɡɐˈbuləf]; Iron Ossetic: Гæбулты Борисы фырт Владимир, romanized: Gabulte Boriše fert Vlâdimir; born 19 October 1983) is a former Russian footballer who played as a goalkeeper. He was part of Russia's Euro 2008, 2017 FIFA Confederations Cup and 2018 FIFA World Cup squads as the third choice goalkeeper.

== Career ==
On 2 January 2018, he signed a 1.5-year contract with the Belgian side Club Brugge.

He officially retired as a player on 12 November 2018.

== International career ==
Gabulov made his debut for Russia on 22 August 2007 in a friendly against Poland before being substituted by Anton Shunin at half-time. He made his competitive debut in a Euro 2008 qualifier against Macedonia and was sent off in the 69th minute fouling against Goran Maznov. On 17 October 2007, he was chosen to play in a vital must win match against England because Igor Akinfeev was injured and Vyacheslav Malafeev was in poor form. He made several key saves as Russia made a comeback from a goal down to defeat England 2–1. For his performance against England, Gabulov started in Russia's remaining two qualifiers against Israel and Andorra before being chosen as the third choice goalkeeper behind Akinfeev and Malafeev for Russia's Euro 2008 squad.

On 11 May 2018, he was included in Russia's extended 2018 FIFA World Cup squad under the call of fellow Ossetian and coach Stanislav Cherchesov. On 3 June 2018, he was included in the finalized World Cup squad. He remained on the bench in all the games behind Igor Akinfeev.

Appearances in major competitions

Year	Competition	Category	Appearances		Goals conceded	Team record
Year	Competition	Category	Start	Sub	Goals conceded	Team record
2004–2005	U-21 Euro 2006 qualifying	U21	9	0	5	Qualified to play-offs
2006–2007	Euro 2008 qualifying	Senior	4	0	3	Qualified

== Post-playing career ==
In the first year after his retirement, from 2018 to 2019, he served as the Minister of Sport in the government of North Ossetia–Alania. In the second half of 2019, he served as the president of Alania Vladikavkaz.

On 18 February 2020, he was appointed chairman of Russian Professional Football League club FC Olimp Khimki. On 28 December 2021, he was hired as a general director of the Russian Premier League club FC Khimki. He left Khimki on 5 May 2022.

== Career statistics ==
=== Club ===
As of 8 December 2017

Club	Season	League			Cup		Continental		Other		Total	
Club	Season	Division	Apps	Goals	Apps	Goals	Apps	Goals	Apps	Goals	Apps	Goals
FC Mozdok	1999	Second Division	18	0	0	0	–		–		18	0
FC Mozdok	2000	Second Division	15	0	0	0	–		–		15	0
FC Mozdok	Total		33	0	0	0	0	0	0	0	33	0
FC Dynamo Moscow	2001	Russian Premier League	11	0	0	0	–		–		11	0
FC Alania Vladikavkaz	2001	Russian Premier League	13	0	1	0	–		–		14	0
FC Alania Vladikavkaz	2002	Russian Premier League	24	0	0	0	–		–		24	0
FC Alania Vladikavkaz	2003	Russian Premier League	6	0	0	0	–		–		6	0
FC Alania Vladikavkaz	Total		43	0	1	0	0	0	0	0	44	0
PFC CSKA Moscow	2004	Russian Premier League	0	0	0	0	0	0	–		0	0
PFC CSKA Moscow	2005	Russian Premier League	0	0	0	0	0	0	–		0	0
PFC CSKA Moscow	2006	Russian Premier League	3	0	0	0	0	0	–		3	0
FC Kuban Krasnodar	2007	Russian Premier League	29	0	1	0	–		–		30	0
FC Amkar Perm	2008	Russian Premier League	10	0	2	0	–		–		12	0
FC Dynamo Moscow	2008	Russian Premier League	12	0	1	0	–		–		13	0
FC Dynamo Moscow	2009	Russian Premier League	23	0	3	0	4	0	–		30	0
FC Dynamo Moscow	2010	Russian Premier League	21	0	2	0	–		–		23	0
PFC CSKA Moscow	2011–12	Russian Premier League	7	0	0	0	6	0	–		13	0
PFC CSKA Moscow	Total (2 spells)		10	0	0	0	6	0	0	0	16	0
FC Anzhi Makhachkala	2011–12	Russian Premier League	11	0	0	0	–		–		11	0
FC Anzhi Makhachkala	2012–13	Russian Premier League	27	0	3	0	15	0	–		45	0
FC Anzhi Makhachkala	2013–14	Russian Premier League	5	0	–		–		–		5	0
FC Anzhi Makhachkala	Total		43	0	3	0	15	0	0	0	61	0
FC Dynamo Moscow	2013–14	Russian Premier League	20	0	1	0	–		–		21	0
FC Dynamo Moscow	2014–15	Russian Premier League	22	0	0	0	10	0	–		32	0
FC Dynamo Moscow	2015–16	Russian Premier League	23	0	2	0	–		–		25	0
FC Dynamo Moscow	Total (3 spells)		132	0	9	0	14	0	0	0	155	0
FC Arsenal Tula	2016–17	Russian Premier League	13	0	–		–		2 (Note: Two appearances in relegation play-offs)	0	15	0
FC Arsenal Tula	2017–18	Russian Premier League	20	0	0	0	–		–		20	0
FC Arsenal Tula	Total		33	0	0	0	0	0	2	0	35	0
Career total			333	0	16	0	35	0	2	0	386	0

=== International ===
Statistics accurate as of match played 25 March 2013

Russia
Year	Apps	Goals
2007	5	0
2010	1	0
2012	2	0
2013	2	0
Total	10	0

== Honours ==
=== Club ===
CSKA Moscow

- UEFA Cup: 2004–05
- Russian Premier League: 2005, 2006
- Russian Super Cup: 2006

Club Brugge

- Belgian Pro League: 2017–18

=== Country ===
- UEFA European Football Championship bronze medalist: 2008

=== Individual ===
- Gentleman of the Year: 2009

== Personal life ==
His younger brother Georgi Gabulov also plays football professionally.
