= Ewerton (footballer, born 1989) =

Brazilian footballer

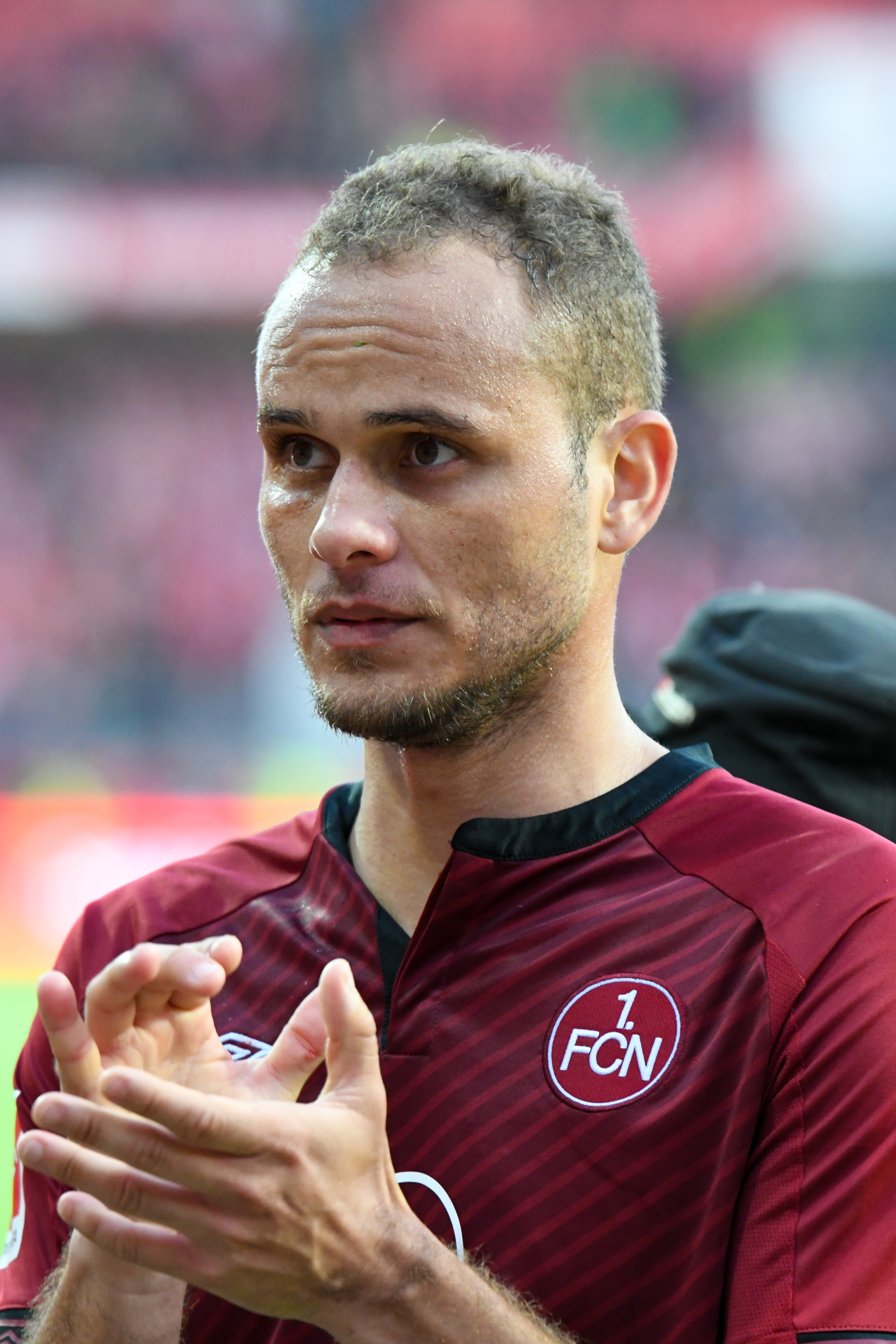
- Ewerton with 1. FC Nürnberg in 2019

Personal information
- Full name: Ewerton José Almeida Santos
- Date of birth: 23 March 1989 (age 37)
- Place of birth: Penedo, Brazil
- Height: 1.88 m (6 ft 2 in)
- Position: Centre-back

Youth career
- –2009: Corinthians (AL)
- 2009: → Palmeiras

Senior career*
Years	Team	Apps	(Gls)
2010–2011	Corinthians (AL)	0	(0)
2010	→ ASA (loan)	22	(1)
2011	→ Oeste (loan)	0	(0)
2011	→ Sport Recife (loan)	0	(0)
2011–2012	→ Braga (loan)	19	(1)
2012–2015	Anzhi Makhachkala	24	(1)
2015	→ Sporting B (loan)	2	(0)
2015	→ Sporting CP (loan)	11	(2)
2015–2017	Sporting CP	18	(1)
2016–2017	→ 1. FC Kaiserslautern (loan)	24	(0)
2017–2019	1. FC Nürnberg	46	(1)
2019–2020	Hamburger SV	5	(0)
2020–2021	Würzburger Kickers	8	(0)
- * Club domestic league appearances and goals

Ewerton José Almeida Santos (born 23 March 1989) is a Brazilian former professional footballer who played as a centre-back.

== Career ==
In August 2012, Ewerton signed for Anzhi Makhachkala from Corinthians having previously been on loan at Braga.

On 22 January 2015, Anzhi loaned him to Portuguese side Sporting CP for the rest of the season.

== Career statistics ==
As of Match played 21 May 2017

Appearances and goals by club, season and competition
Club	Season	League			Cup		Other		Total	
Club	Season	Division	Apps	Goals	Apps	Goals	Apps	Goals	Apps	Goals
Braga (loan)	2011–12	Primeira Liga	18	1	4	0	9	1	31	2
Anzhi Makhachkala	2012–13	Russian Premier League	7	0	2	0	4	0	13	0
Anzhi Makhachkala	2013–14	Russian Premier League	12	1	1	0	7	1	20	2
Anzhi Makhachkala	2014–15	Russian National League	2	0	0	0	–		2	0
Anzhi Makhachkala	Total		21	1	3	0	11	1	35	2
Sporting CP (loan)	2014–15	Primeira Liga	9	1	2	1	0	0	11	2
Sporting CP	2015–16	Primeira Liga	8	1	5	0	5	0	18	1
Sporting CP	2016–17	Primeira Liga	0	0	0	0	0	0	0	0
1. FC Kaiserslautern (loan)	2016–17	2. Bundesliga	24	0	0	0	0	0	24	0
Career total			63	2	7	0	20	2	90	4

== Honours ==
Sporting

- Taça de Portugal: 2014–15
