= Yevgeny Pomazan =

Russian footballer

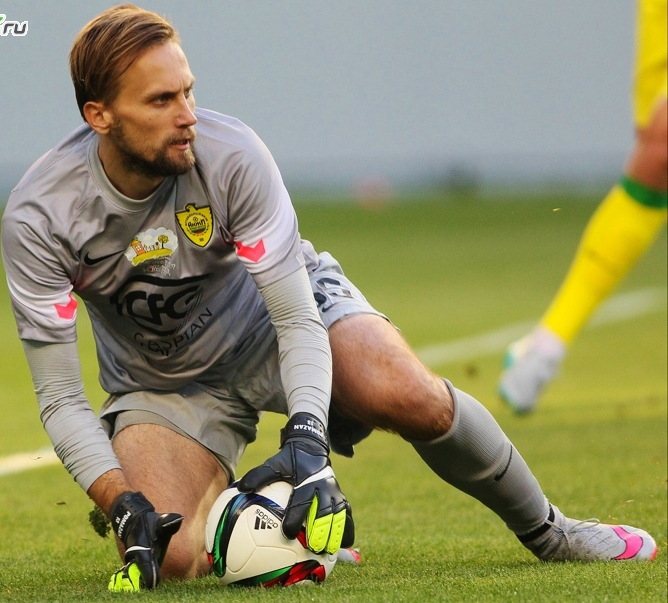
- Pomazan with Anzhi in 2015

Personal information
- Full name: Yevgeny Valeryevich Pomazan
- Date of birth: 31 January 1989 (age 37)
- Place of birth: Angren, Uzbek SSR
- Height: 1.93 m (6 ft 4 in)
- Position: Goalkeeper

Youth career
- –2006: Kuban Krasnodar

Senior career*
Years	Team	Apps	(Gls)
2006–2007	Kuban Krasnodar	0	(0)
2007	→ CSKA Moscow (loan)	1	(0)
2008–2011	CSKA Moscow	0	(0)
2010	→ Ural Yekaterinburg (loan)	19	(0)
2011	→ Spartak Nalchik (loan)	6	(0)
2011–2016	Anzhi Makhachkala	21	(0)
2013	→ Ural Yekaterinburg (loan)	6	(0)
2014–2015	→ Kuban Krasnodar (loan)	0	(0)
2016–2017	Kuban Krasnodar	5	(0)
2017–2020	Baltika Kaliningrad	70	(0)
2020–2021	Dinamo Minsk	20	(0)
2021–2022	Chayka Peschanokopskoye	22	(0)
2022–2023	SKA-Khabarovsk	7	(0)

International career
2005–2006	Russia U17	11	(0)
2007–2008	Russia U19	5	(0)
2009	Russia U21	2	(0)
2011–2012	Russia II	2	(0)
- * Club domestic league appearances and goals

Yevgeny Valeryevich Pomazan (Russian: Евгений Валерьевич Помазан; born 31 January 1989) is a Russian former professional footballer.

== Career ==
Pomazan was part of the Russian Under 17 squad that won the 2006 UEFA European Under-17 Football Championship. In 2007, he represented Europe at the Meridian Cup, which the European team won 10–1 on aggregate over two games.

On the final day of the transfer window in the summer of 2007, Pomazan signed on loan with CSKA Moscow. He made his Russian Premier League debut for CSKA Moscow on 28 October 2007 in a 4–2 game against Krylia Sovetov Samara.

In the June 2013 Pomazan joined newly promoted Ural Yekaterinburg on a season-long loan.

On 2 July 2014 Pomazan joined Kuban Krasnodar on a season-long loan deal. He only played one game for Kuban in the Russian Cup.

== Career statistics ==
Club	Season	League			Cup		Continental		Other		Total	
Club	Season	Division	Apps	Goals	Apps	Goals	Apps	Goals	Apps	Goals	Apps	Goals
Kuban Krasnodar	2007	Russian Premier League	0	0	–		–		–		0	0
CSKA Moscow (loan)	2007	Russian Premier League	1	0	0	0	0	0	–		1	0
CSKA Moscow	2008	Russian Premier League	0	0	2	0	0	0	–		2	0
CSKA Moscow	2009	Russian Premier League	0	0	0	0	0	0	0	0	0	0
CSKA Moscow	Total		0	0	2	0	0	0	0	0	2	0
Ural Yekaterinburg (loan)	2010	Russian First League	19	0	1	0	–		–		20	0
Spartak Nalchik (loan)	2011–12	Russian Premier League	6	0	0	0	–		–		6	0
Anzhi Makhachkala	2011–12	Russian Premier League	5	0	–		–		–		5	0
Anzhi Makhachkala	2012–13	Russian Premier League	5	0	2	0	1 (Note: Appearances in the UEFA Europa League)	0	–		8	0
Anzhi Makhachkala	2013–14	Russian Premier League	2	0	1	0	3	0	–		6	0
Anzhi Makhachkala	2015–16	Russian Premier League	9	0	1	0	–		0	0	10	0
Anzhi Makhachkala	2016–17	Russian Premier League	0	0	–		–		–		0	0
Anzhi Makhachkala	Total		21	0	4	0	4	0	!0	0	29	0
Ural Yekaterinburg (loan)	2013–14	Russian Premier League	6	0	–		–		–		6	0
Kuban Krasnodar (loan)	2014–15	Russian Premier League	0	0	1	0	–		–		1	0
Kuban Krasnodar	2016–17	Russian First League	5	0	–		–		3 (Note: Appearances in the FNL Cup)	0	8	0
Baltika Kaliningrad	2017–18	Russian First League	37	0	1	0	–		–		38	0
Baltika Kaliningrad	2018–19	Russian First League	28	0	1	0	–		–		29	0
Baltika Kaliningrad	2019–20	Russian First League	5	0	1	0	–		–		6	0
Baltika Kaliningrad	Total		70	0	3	0	0	0	!0	0	73	0
Dinamo Minsk	2020	Belarusian Premier League	13	0	1	0	1	0	–		15	0
Dinamo Minsk	2021	Belarusian Premier League	7	0	0	0	–		–		7	0
Dinamo Minsk	Total		20	0	1	0	1	0	!0	0	22	0
Chayka	2021–22	Russian Second League	22	0	5	0	–		–		27	0
SKA-Khabarovsk	2022–23	Russian First League	7	0	0	0	–		–		7	0
Career total			177	0	17	0	5	0	!3	0	202	0

== Career honours ==
- Russian Cup: 2008, 2009
