= Aleksandr Shchanitsyn =

Russian footballer

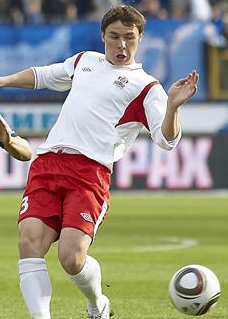

Personal information
- Full name: Aleksandr Yevgenyevich Shchanitsin
- Date of birth: 2 December 1984 (age 41)
- Place of birth: Ivanovo, Russian SFSR
- Height: 1.73 m (5 ft 8 in)
- Position: Midfielder

Senior career*
Years	Team	Apps	(Gls)
2003–2005	FC Tekstilshchik-Telekom Ivanovo	76	(17)
2006–2009	FC Ural Sverdlovsk Oblast	122	(9)
2010–2012	PFC Spartak Nalchik	46	(2)
2012–2014	FC Ural Sverdlovsk Oblast	41	(4)
2015–2021	FC Tekstilshchik Ivanovo	112	(17)
- * Club domestic league appearances and goals

Aleksandr Yevgenyevich Shchanitsin (Russian: Александр Евгеньевич Щаницин; born 2 December 1984) is a Russian former professional footballer.

== Club career ==
Shchanitsyn made his professional debut in the Russian Second Division in 2003 for FC Tekstilshchik Ivanovo. He made his Russian Premier League debut for PFC Spartak Nalchik on 13 March 2010 in a game against FC Anzhi Makhachkala.

== Career statistics ==
As of 11 July 2012

Club	Div	Season	League		Cup		Total	
Club	Div	Season	Apps	Goals	Apps	Goals	Apps	Goals
(Russia) Tekstilshchik-Telekom Ivanovo	D3	2003	25	7	1	0	26	7
(Russia) Tekstilshchik-Telekom Ivanovo	D3	2004	25	3	1	0	26	3
(Russia) Tekstilshchik-Telekom Ivanovo	D3	2005	26	7	0	0	26	7
(Russia) Tekstilshchik-Telekom Ivanovo	Total		76	17	2	0	78	17
(Russia) Ural Sverdlovsk Oblast	D2	2006	25	3	2	0	27	3
(Russia) Ural Sverdlovsk Oblast	D2	2007	32	2	2	0	34	2
(Russia) Ural Sverdlovsk Oblast	D2	2008	37	3	1	0	38	3
(Russia) Ural Sverdlovsk Oblast	D2	2009	28	1	3	0	31	1
(Russia) Ural Sverdlovsk Oblast	Total		122	9	8	0	130	9
(Russia) Spartak Nalchik	D1	2010	16	1	1	0	17	1
(Russia) Spartak Nalchik	D1	2011–12	30	1	0	0	30	1
(Russia) Spartak Nalchik	Total		46	2	1	0	47	2
(Russia) Ural Sverdlovsk Oblast	D2	2012–13	1	0	0	0	1	0
(Russia) Ural Sverdlovsk Oblast	Total		1	0	0	0	1	0
Career total			245	28	11	0	256	11
