= Kamil Agalarov =

Russian professional footballer

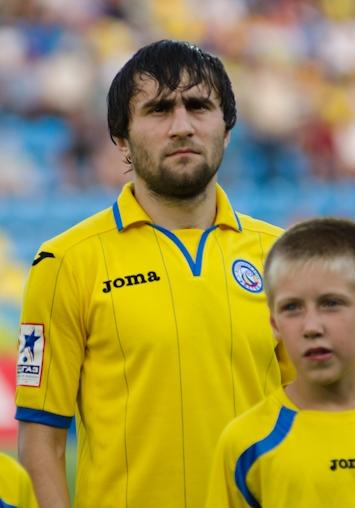
- Agalarov with FC Rostov in 2013

Personal information
- Full name: Kamil Agabekovich Agalarov
- Date of birth: 11 June 1988 (age 38)
- Place of birth: Makhachkala, Russian SFSR
- Height: 1.78 m (5 ft 10 in)
- Position: Right back

Team information
- Current team: Dynamo-2 Makhachkala (assistant coach)

Senior career*
| Years | Team | Apps | (Gls) |
| 2004–2005 | Anzhi-Khazar Makhachkala (amateur) | | |
| 2005–2006 | Dynamo Makhachkala | 16 | (0) |
| 2007 | Chernomorets Novorossiysk | 26 | (1) |
| 2008 | Dagdizel Kaspiysk | 14 | (0) |
| 2008–2013 | Anzhi Makhachkala | 103 | (2) |
| 2013 | FC Rostov | 5 | (0) |
| 2013–2016 | Anzhi Makhachkala | 40 | (0) |
| 2017 | Anzhi Makhachkala | 0 | (0) |
| 2019–2022 | Dynamo Makhachkala | 52 | (1) |
| Total | | 256 | (4) |

International career
| 2011 | Russia II | 1 | (0) |

Managerial career
- 2024–: Dynamo-2 Makhachkala (assistant)
- * Club domestic league appearances and goals

Kamil Agabekovich Agalarov (Russian: Камиль Агабекович Агаларов; born 11 June 1988) is a Russian professional football coach and a former player who is an assistant coach with Dynamo-2 Makhachkala.

== Club career ==
He made his professional debut in the Russian First Division for FC Dynamo Makhachkala on 8 August 2005 in a game against FC Avangard Kursk.

He made his Russian Premier League debut for FC Anzhi Makhachkala on 26 March 2010 in a game against PFC CSKA Moscow. He played for 5 seasons in the Russian Premier League.

== Personal life ==
He is a younger brother of Ruslan Agalarov.

== Career statistics ==
=== Club ===
As of match played 18 March 2016

Appearances and goals by club, season and competition
| Club | Season | League | | | National Cup | | League Cup | | Continental | | Other | | Total | |
| Club | Season | Division | Apps | Goals | Apps | Goals | Apps | Goals | Apps | Goals | Apps | Goals | Apps | Goals |
|---|---|---|---|---|---|---|---|---|---|---|---|---|---|---|
| Dynamo Makhachkala | 2005 | Russian First Division | 2 | 0 | 0 | 0 | – | | – | | – | | 2 | 0 |
| Dynamo Makhachkala | 2006 | Russian First Division | 13 | 0 | 2 | 1 | – | | – | | – | | 15 | 1 |
| Dynamo Makhachkala | Total | | 15 | 0 | 2 | 1 | - | - | - | - | - | - | 17 | 1 |
| Chernomorets Novorossiysk | 2007 | Russian Second Division | 26 | 1 | 3 | 0 | – | | – | | – | | 29 | 1 |
| Anzhi Makhachkala | 2008 | Russian First Division | 8 | 0 | 1 | 0 | – | | – | | – | | 9 | 0 |
| Anzhi Makhachkala | 2009 | Russian First Division | 25 | 0 | 0 | 0 | – | | – | | – | | 25 | 0 |
| Anzhi Makhachkala | 2010 | RPL | 27 | 1 | 0 | 0 | – | | 0 | 0 | – | | 27 | 1 |
| Anzhi Makhachkala | 2011–12 | RPL | 29 | 1 | 2 | 0 | – | | – | | – | | 31 | 1 |
| Anzhi Makhachkala | 2012–13 | RPL | 14 | 0 | 1 | 0 | – | | 7 | 0 | – | | 22 | 0 |
| Anzhi Makhachkala | Total | | 103 | 2 | 4 | 0 | - | - | 7 | 0 | - | - | 114 | 2 |
| Rostov | 2013–14 | RPL | 5 | 0 | 0 | 0 | – | | – | | – | | 5 | 0 |
| Anzhi Makhachkala | 2013–14 | RPL | 12 | 0 | 1 | 0 | – | | 6 | 0 | – | | 19 | 0 |
| Anzhi Makhachkala | 2014–15 | FNL | 18 | 0 | 1 | 0 | – | | – | | – | | 19 | 0 |
| Anzhi Makhachkala | 2015–16 | RPL | 10 | 0 | 2 | 0 | – | | – | | 0 | 0 | 12 | 0 |
| Anzhi Makhachkala | Total | | 40 | 0 | 4 | 0 | - | - | 6 | 0 | 0 | 0 | 50 | 0 |
| Anzhi Makhachkala | 2016–17 | RPL | 0 | 0 | 0 | 0 | – | | – | | – | | 0 | 0 |
| Career total | | | 189 | 2 | 13 | 1 | - | - | 13 | 0 | - | - | 215 | 4 |
