= Aleksei Ivanov (footballer, born 1981) =

Russian footballer

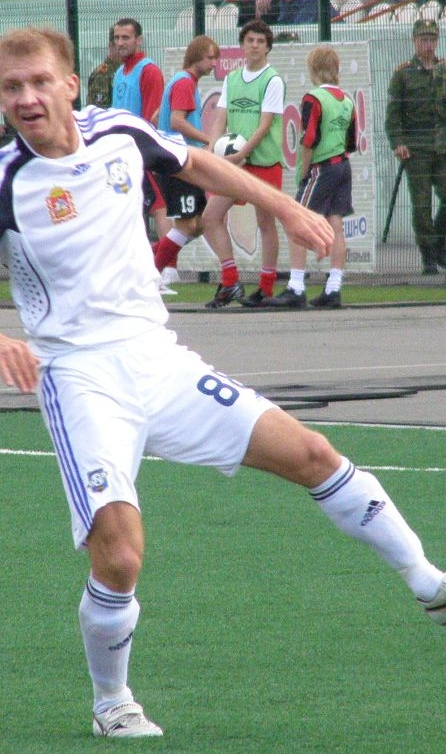

Personal information
- Full name: Aleksei Vladimirovich Ivanov
- Date of birth: 1 September 1981 (age 45)
- Place of birth: Saratov, Soviet Union
- Height: 1.78 m (5 ft 10 in)
- Position: Winger

Youth career
- Sokol

Senior career*
Years	Team	Apps	(Gls)
1999	Sokol	0	(0)
1999	Balakovo	12	(2)
2000	Salyut Saratov	28	(4)
2001	Sokol-2	25	(1)
2002–2003	Fakel Voronezh	68	(12)
2004	Sokol	25	(4)
2004	Khimki	12	(0)
2005–2007	Luch-Energiya Vladivostok	78	(14)
2007–2010	Saturn Moscow Oblast	91	(7)
2011–2012	Anzhi Makhachkala	25	(1)
2012–2016	Mordovia Saransk	69	(11)
- * Club domestic league appearances and goals

Aleksei Vladimirovich Ivanov (Russian: Алексей Владимирович Иванов, born 1 September 1981) is a former Russian footballer. He primarily played as a winger, but could also play in the centre of midfield.

== Club career ==
He made his Russian Premier League debut for FC Luch-Energiya Vladivostok on 18 March 2006 in a game against FC Spartak Moscow.
