= 2010 FC Anzhi Makhachkala season =

Anzhi Makhachkala
2010 season
- Chairman: Suleyman Kerimov
- Manager: Omari Tetradze (until 18 March); Arsen Akayev (caretaker) (18 March – 18 April); Gadzhi Gadzhiyev (from 18 April)
- Stadium: Dynamo Stadium
- Premier League: 11th
- Russian Cup: Round of 16 vs Zenit St.Petersburg
- Top goalscorer: League: David Tsorayev (8); All: David Tsorayev (8)
- Highest home attendance: 15,200 vs CSKA Moscow; 26 March 2010
- Lowest home attendance: 7,500 vs Saturn Ramenskoye; 20 November 2010
- Average home league attendance: 11,307 (20 November 2010)
Home colours	Away colours

The 2010 FC Anzhi Makhachkala season was the 1st season that the club played in the Russian Premier League, the highest tier of football in Russia since their relegation in 2002. They finished 11th in the league and also took part in the 2010–11 Russian Cup, exiting at the round of 16 stage.

== Season events ==
On 25 January, Mahir Shukurov signed for Anzhi Makhachkala.

On 2 March, Otar Martsvaladze moved to Volga Nizhny Novgorod on loan for the season.

On 18 March, Omari Tetradze resigned as manager, with Gadzhi Gadzhiyev being appointed as their new manager on 18 April.

On 1 August, Oskars Kļava signed for Anzhi Makhachkala from Liepājas Metalurgs.

== Squad ==
As of match played 28 November 2010

No.	Name	Nationality	Position	Date of birth (age)	Signed from	Signed in	Contract ends	Apps.	Goals
Goalkeepers
1	Ilya Abayev	(Russia)	GK	2 August 1981 (aged 29)	Torpedo Moscow	2009			
29	Nukri Revishvili	(Georgia (country))	GK	2 March 1987 (aged 23)	Rubin Kazan	2010		14	0
30	Mehdi Jannatov	(Russia)	GK	26 January 1992 (aged 18)	Academy	2010		0	0
37	Leonid Musin	(Ukraine)	GK	19 April 1985 (aged 25)	Oleksandriya	2010		0	0
99	Abdulla Gadzhikadiyev	(Russia)	GK	10 April 1993 (aged 17)	Academy	2010		0	0
Defenders
3	Oskars Kļava	(Latvia)	DF	8 August 1983 (aged 27)	Liepājas Metalurgs	2010	2012	10	0
4	Mahir Shukurov	(Azerbaijan)	DF	12 December 1982 (aged 27)	Inter Baku	2010		20	0
5	Ibra Kébé	(Senegal)	DF	24 December 1978 (aged 31)	Spartak Nizhny Novgorod	2006			
13	Rasim Tagirbekov	(Russia)	DF	4 May 1984 (aged 26)	Academy	2002			
31	Mitar Peković	(Serbia)	DF	28 September 1981 (aged 29)	Vojvodina	2010		20	0
50	Magomed Abidinov	(Russia)	DF	3 February 1989 (aged 21)	Academy	2010		1	0
55	Badavi Huseynov	(Russia)	DF	11 July 1991 (aged 19)	Dagdizel Kaspiysk	2010		0	0
61	Mahammad Mirzabeyov	(Russia)	DF	16 November 1990 (aged 20)	Torpedo-ZIL Moscow	2010		1	0
63	Ali Gadzhibekov	(Russia)	DF	6 August 1989 (aged 21)	Academy	2006			
77	Otar Khizaneishvili	(Georgia (country))	DF	26 September 1981 (aged 29)	Augsburg	2010		7	0
88	Murad Kurbanov	(Russia)	DF	22 March 1992 (aged 18)	Academy	2010		1	0
89	Akhmad Magomedov	(Russia)	DF	10 August 1989 (aged 21)	Academy	2010		1	0
91	Anvar Ibragimgadzhiyev	(Russia)	DF	27 September 1991 (aged 19)	Akademiya Tolyatti	2010		1	0
Midfielders
6	David Tsorayev	(Russia)	MF	7 May 1983 (aged 27)	KAMAZ	2008			
7	Kamil Agalarov	(Russia)	MF	11 June 1988 (aged 22)	Dagdizel Kaspiysk	2007			
8	Andrei Streltsov	(Russia)	MF	18 March 1984 (aged 26)	Khimki	2010		17	2
14	Dmitri Ivanov	(Russia)	MF	14 February 1987 (aged 23)	Rostov	2008			
15	Nicolae Josan	(Moldova)	MF	18 March 1984 (aged 26)	Iskra-Stal	2008			
19	Zurab Arziani	(Georgia (country))	MF	19 October 1987 (aged 23)	Olimpi Rustavi	2007			
20	Mikhail Bakayev	(Russia)	MF	5 August 1987 (aged 23)	Alania Vladikavkaz	2009			
23	Shamil Burziyev	(Russia)	MF	1 April 1985 (aged 25)	Fakel Voronezh	2010			
86	Todor Timonov	(Bulgaria)	MF	3 September 1986 (aged 24)	CSKA Sofia	2010		12	1
95	Shamil Alimagomayev	(Russia)	MF	13 July 1989 (aged 21)	Rubin Kazan	2009		0	0
96	Sharif Mukhammad	(Russia)	MF	21 March 1990 (aged 20)	Dynamo Makhachkala	2010		3	0
97	Gadzhi Gadzhiyev	(Russia)	MF	27 March 1991 (aged 19)	FSA Voronezh	2010		1	0
Forwards
9	Magomed Magomedov	(Russia)	FW	11 December 1987 (aged 22)	Krylia Sovetov	2005			
16	Dmitri Vasilyev	(Russia)	FW	2 May 1985 (aged 25)	Krylia Sovetov	2010		0	0
17	Jan Holenda	(Czech Republic)	FW	22 August 1985 (aged 25)	Sparta Prague	2010		18	5
18	Ilya Kukharchuk	(Russia)	FW	2 August 1990 (aged 20)	Rubin Kazan	2010		12	2
21	Giorgi Iluridze	(Georgia (country))	FW	20 February 1992 (aged 18)	Dinamo Tbilisi	2010		6	0
22	Miro Slavov	(Ukraine)	FW	8 September 1990 (aged 20)	Girondins de Bordeaux	2010		0	0
25	Isah Eliakwu	(Nigeria)	FW	25 October 1985 (aged 25)	Varese	2010		0	0
28	Igor Strelkov	(Russia)	FW	21 March 1982 (aged 28)	loan from Krylia Sovetov	2010			
Reserves
24	Leonardo	(Brazil)	FW	3 May 1992 (aged 18)	Flamengo	2010		0	0
27	Murtazali Abdulayev	(Russia)	MF	20 May 1991 (aged 19)	Academy	2010		0	0
33	Shamil Mirzayev	(Russia)	FW	28 November 1992 (aged 18)	Academy	2010		0	0
35	Makhach Ispagiyev	(Russia)	MF	27 August 1990 (aged 20)	Academy	2010		0	0
40	Azamat Ibragimov	(Russia)	MF	28 May 1991 (aged 19)	Academy	2010		0	0
43	Salimkhan Dzhamiliyev	(Russia)	MF	11 April 1990 (aged 20)	Academy	2010		0	0
44	Mikail Zaytsev	(Russia)	DF	21 May 1990 (aged 20)	Academy	2010		0	0
87	Paizulla Medzhidov	(Russia)	MF	16 June 1992 (aged 18)	Academy	2010		0	0
90	Gamzat Omarov	(Russia)	DF	21 September 1990 (aged 20)	Academy	2010		0	0
92	Mikhail Abakarov	(Russia)	MF	28 April 1992 (aged 18)	Academy	2010		0	0
93	Ruslan Aliyev	(Russia)	FW	23 September 1988 (aged 22)	Academy	2010		0	0
98	Gamzat Makhmudov	(Russia)	FW	20 May 1991 (aged 19)	Academy	2010		0	0
Out on loan
10	Gocha Khojava	(Georgia (country))	MF	16 March 1985 (aged 25)	Olimpi Rustavi	2007			
23	Sandro Iashvili	(Georgia (country))	FW	3 January 1985 (aged 25)	Sioni Bolnisi	2009			
Players who left during the season
2	Davit Kvirkvelia	(Georgia (country))	DF	27 June 1980 (aged 30)	Rubin Kazan	2010		13	0
32	Revaz Barabadze	(Georgia (country))	FW	4 October 1988 (aged 22)	Carl Zeiss Jena	2008			
70	Eldar Mamayev	(Russia)	MF	14 June 1985 (aged 25)	RSDYuShOR-2 Makhachkala	2001			

=== Out on loan ===
Note: Flags indicate national team as defined under FIFA eligibility rules; some limited exceptions apply. Players may hold more than one non-FIFA nationality.

No.	Pos.	Nation	Player
23	FW	GEO	Sandro Iashvili (at Olimpi Rustavi)

== Transfers ==
=== In ===
Date	Position	Nationality	Name	From	Fee	Ref.
1 January 2010	DF	(Serbia)	Mitar Peković	Vojvodina	Undisclosed	
1 January 2010	FW	(Brazil)	William	Paços de Ferreira	Undisclosed	
1 January 2010	FW	(Czech Republic)	Jan Holenda	Sparta Prague	Undisclosed	
1 January 2010	FW	(Georgia (country))	Revaz Barabadze	Unattached	Free	
25 January 2010	DF	(Azerbaijan)	Mahir Shukurov	Inter Baku	Undisclosed	
1 February 2010	GK	(Georgia (country))	Nukri Revishvili	Rubin Kazan	Undisclosed	
1 February 2010	MF	(Bulgaria)	Todor Timonov	CSKA Sofia	Undisclosed	
1 February 2010	MF	(Russia)	Andrei Streltsov	Khimki	Undisclosed	
1 July 2010	DF	(Georgia (country))	Otar Khizaneishvili	Augsburg	Undisclosed	
1 August 2010	GK	(Ukraine)	Leonid Musin	Unattached	Free	
1 August 2010	DF	(Latvia)	Oskars Kļava	Liepājas Metalurgs	Undisclosed	
1 August 2010	FW	(Nigeria)	Isah Eliakwu	Varese	Undisclosed	
1 August 2010	FW	(Ukraine)	Miro Slavov	Girondins de Bordeaux	Undisclosed	
1 August 2010	MF	(Russia)	Shamil Burziyev	Fakel Voronezh	Undisclosed	
1 August 2010	FW	(Russia)	Dmitri Vasilyev	Unattached	Free	
5 August 2010	MF	(Russia)	Ilya Kukharchuk	Rubin Kazan	Undisclosed	

=== Loans in ===
Date from	Position	Nationality	Name	From	Date to	Ref.
1 January 2010	FW	(Georgia (country))	Davit Kvirkvelia	Rubin Kazan	30 June 2010	
1 August 2010	FW	(Russia)	Igor Strelkov	Krylia Sovetov	31 December 2010	

=== Out ===
Date	Position	Nationality	Name	To	Fee	Ref.
26 March 2010	MF	(Russia)	Daniil Gridnev	Krylia Sovetov	Undisclosed	
1 July 2010	FW	(Brazil)	William	Vitória de Guimarães	Undisclosed	
1 July 2010	FW	(Georgia (country))	Revaz Barabadze	Olimpi Rustavi	Undisclosed	
1 August 2010	DF	(Georgia (country))	Giorgi Navalovski	Volga Nizhny Novgorod	Undisclosed	
7 August 2010	MF	(Russia)	Eldar Mamayev	Ural Sverdlovsk Oblast	Undisclosed	

=== Loans out ===
Date from	Position	Nationality	Name	To	Date to	Ref.
1 January 2010	FW	(Georgia (country))	Sandro Iashvili	Olimpi Rustavi	31 December 2010	
4 February 2010	DF	(Georgia (country))	Giorgi Navalovski	Inter Baku	30 June 2010	
2 March 2010	FW	(Georgia (country))	Otar Martsvaladze	Volga Nizhny Novgorod	31 December 2010	
1 July 2010	FW	(Georgia (country))	Revaz Barabadze	Volga Nizhny Novgorod	31 December 2010	

=== Released ===
Date	Position	Nationality	Name	Joined	Date	Ref.
5 December 2010	DF	(Russia)	Shamil Burziyev	Died in a car accident		
31 December 2009	DF	(Georgia (country))	Kakhaber Aladashvili	Zestafoni	1 July 2010	
31 December 2009	DF	(Russia)	Valerian Bestayev	Retired		
31 December 2009	MF	(Russia)	Vardan Mazalov	SKA Rostov-on-Don	1 August 2011	
31 December 2010	DF	(Georgia (country))	Otar Khizaneishvili	Vostok	1 July 2011	
31 December 2010	DF	(Russia)	Mikail Zaytsev			
31 December 2010	DF	(Serbia)	Mitar Peković	Budućnost Podgorica	1 July 2011	
31 December 2010	MF	(Moldova)	Nicolae Josan	Dacia Chișinău	1 January 2012	
31 December 2010	MF	(Russia)	Mikail Abakarov			
31 December 2010	MF	(Russia)	Murtazali Abdullayev			
31 December 2010	MF	(Russia)	Makhach Ispagiyev			
31 December 2010	FW	(Russia)	Gamzat Makhmudov			
31 December 2010	MF	(Russia)	Paizulla Medzhidov			
31 December 2010	FW	(Brazil)	Leonardo			
31 December 2010	FW	(Russia)	Magomed Magomedov	Retired		

== Competitions ==
=== Premier League ===
==== Results summary ====
Overall								Home						Away					
Pld	W	D	L	GF	GA	GD	Pts	W	D	L	GF	GA	GD	W	D	L	GF	GA	GD
30	9	6	15	29	39	−10	33	5	4	6	13	13	0	4	2	9	16	26	−10

Last updated: complete.
Source: See Results

==== Results by round ====
Round	1	2	3	4	5	6	7	8	9	10	11	12	13	14	15	16	17	18	19	20	21	22	23	24	25	26	27	28	29	30
Ground	H	A	H	H	A	H	A	H	A	H	A	A	A	H	A	H	A	A	H	A	H	A	H	A	H	H	H	A	H	A
Result	D	L	L	W	W	L	D	D	L	D	L	L	W	W	L	W	L	D	W	L	L	L	L	L	D	L	W	W	L	W
Position	9	13	14	10	8	9	12	9	12	12	12	13	11	11	12	11	12	12	10	11	12	12	12	12	13	13	12	11	12	11

Source: Soccerway
A = Away; H = Home; W = Win; D = Draw; L = Loss

==== Results ====
13 March 2010 1	Anzhi Makhachkala	0–0	Spartak Nalchik	Makhachkala
15:15 MSK (UTC+3)	Khojava (yellow card) 12'	Report	Džudović (yellow card) 74'; Geteriev (yellow card) 75'	Stadium: Dynamo Stadium; Attendance: 13,000; Referee: Aleksei Nikolaev

20 March 2010 2	Amkar Perm	1–0	Anzhi Makhachkala	Perm
12:00 MSK (UTC+3)	Knežević (yellow card) 12'; Novaković (yellow card) 16'; Cherenchikov 71'; Volkov (yellow card) 79'	Report	Josan (yellow card) 5'; Holenda (yellow card) 7'; Shukurov (yellow card) 39' (yellow-red card) 41'; Peković (yellow card) 50'	Stadium: Zvezda Stadium; Attendance: 11,800; Referee: Vyachelsav Popov

26 March 2010 3	Anzhi Makhachkala	1–2	CSKA Moscow	Makhachkala
20:15 MSD (UTC+4)	Khojava (yellow card) 7'; Streltsov 11'; Agalarov (yellow card) 26'	Report	Nababkin (yellow card) 46'; Honda 49'; Rahimić (yellow card) 59'; Necid 62', (yellow card) 87'; Šemberas (yellow card) 79'; V.Berezutski (yellow card) 88'	Stadium: Dynamo Stadium; Attendance: 15,200; Referee: Igor Egorov

3 April 2010 4	Anzhi Makhachkala	2–0	Alania Vladikavkaz	Makhachkala
16:15 MSD (UTC+4)	Streltsov 24' (pen.); Holenda (yellow card) 41', (goal) 53'	Report	Stoyanov (yellow card) 35'	Stadium: Dynamo Stadium; Attendance: 12,500; Referee: Yuri Baskakov

11 April 2010 5	Sibir Novosibirsk	2–4	Anzhi Makhachkala	Novosibirsk
11:30 MSD (UTC+4)	Bliznyuk (yellow card) 38'; Aravin (yellow card) 51' (red card) 68'; A.Medvedev 58'; Astafyev 60'; Makarenko (red card) 71'; Molosh (yellow card) 88'	Report	Holenda (yellow card) 10' (goal) 34', 48'; Tsorayev 21', 90' (yellow card) 90'; Bakayev (yellow card) 38'; Khojava (yellow card) 78'; Revishvili (yellow card) 83'	Stadium: Spartak Stadium; Attendance: 10,000; Referee: Maksim Layushkin

19 April 2010 6	Anzhi Makhachkala	1–2	Rostov	Makhachkala
17:00 MSD (UTC+4)	Agalarov (yellow card) 14'; Khojava (yellow card) 45'; Tsorayev 47'	Report	Adamov 61'; Kalachev 85'; Pavlenko (yellow card) 90'	Stadium: Dynamo Stadium; Attendance: 12,000; Referee: Almir Kayumov

25 April 2010 7	Rubin Kazan	0–0	Anzhi Makhachkala	Kazan
18:30 MSD (UTC+4)	Orekhov (yellow card) 71'	Report	Kébé (yellow card) 34'; Agalarov (yellow card) 55'; Revishvili (yellow card) 84'; Arziani (yellow card) 90'	Stadium: Central Stadium; Attendance: 8,120; Referee: Eduard Malyi

30 April 2010 8	Anzhi Makhachkala	0–0	Krylia Sovetov	Makhachkala
17:00 MSD (UTC+4)	Ivanov (yellow card) 23'	Report	Gridnev (yellow card) 82'	Stadium: Dynamo Stadium; Attendance: 10,000; Referee: Aleksei Nikolaev

6 May 2010 9	Spartak Moscow	3–0	Anzhi Makhachkala	Moscow
21:00 MSD (UTC+4)	Welliton 42', 67'; Stranzl (yellow card) 84'; Alex 86'	Report	Agalarov (yellow card) 69'	Stadium: Luzhniki Stadium; Attendance: 19,000; Referee: Aleksandr Gvardis

11 May 2010 10	Anzhi Makhachkala	1–1	Dynamo Moscow	Makhachkala
20:30 MSD (UTC+4)	Streltsov (yellow card) 15'; Mamayev 33' (yellow card) 86'	Report	Semshov 30'	Stadium: Dynamo Stadium; Attendance: 13,000; Referee: Vladislav Bezborodov

4 July 2010 11	Zenit St.Petersburg	2–1	Anzhi Makhachkala	Saint Petersburg
19:00 MSD (UTC+4)	Bystrov 15'; Rosina (yellow card) 52'; Lombaerts (yellow card) 64'; Zyryanov 87'	Report	Tsorayev (yellow card) 39' (yellow-red card) 88'; Agalarov (yellow card) 49'; Tagirbekov 66'; Bakayev (yellow card) 82'	Stadium: Petrovsky Stadium; Attendance: 21,380; Referee: Maksim Layushkin

10 July 2010 12	Lokomotiv Moscow	2–1	Anzhi Makhachkala	Moscow
20:30 MSD (UTC+4)	Dujmović 17', (yellow card) 90'; Aliyev 68'	Report	Timonov (yellow card) 58'; Tagirbekov 90'	Stadium: Lokomotiv Stadium; Attendance: 3,000; Referee: Vyacheslav Popov
Note: Match originally scheduled for game week 26, but matches reversed due to the poor condition of Anzhi's Dynamo Stadium pitch.

18 July 2010 13	Tom Tomsk	1–4	Anzhi Makhachkala	Tomsk
16:00 MSD (UTC+4)	Pareiko (yellow card) 45'; Dzyuba 74'	Report	Agalarov 19'; Josan (yellow card) 21' (goal) 45' (pen.); Tsorayev (yellow card) 28' (goal) 77'; Kvirkvelia (yellow card) 65'; Bakayev (yellow card) 69'; Gadzhibekov 71' (yellow card) 73'	Stadium: Trud Stadium; Attendance: 9,800; Referee: Sergei Karasev

25 July 2010 14	Anzhi Makhachkala	1–0	Terek Grozny	Makhachkala
18:45 MSD (UTC+4)	Bakayev (yellow card) 38'; Tsorayev 75'	Report	Katsayev (yellow card) 38'; Gvazava (yellow card) 90'	Stadium: Dynamo Stadium; Attendance: 10,000; Referee: Almir Kayumov

30 July 2010 15	Saturn Ramenskoye	1–0	Anzhi Makhachkala	Ramenskoye
18:45 MSD (UTC+4)	Zelão (yellow card) 53'; Sapeta 67'; Evseev (yellow card) 71'	Report	Gadzhibekov (yellow card) 53'; Mamayev (yellow card) 75'	Stadium: Saturn Stadium; Attendance: 4,000; Referee: Vyacheslav Kharlamov

7 August 2010 16	Anzhi Makhachkala	1–0	Amkar Perm	Makhachkala
20:00 MSD (UTC+4)	Josan 43' (pen.); Shukurov (yellow card) 63'; Burziyev (yellow card) 90+'	Report	Sirakov (yellow card) 8'; Novaković (yellow card) 41'; Kalashnikov (yellow card) 43'	Stadium: Dynamo Stadium; Attendance: 9,700; Referee: Eduard Malyi

15 August 2010 17	CSKA Moscow	4–0	Anzhi Makhachkala	Khimki
20:30 MSD (UTC+4)	Oliseh 12', 44'; Vágner Love 20'; Tošić 36' (yellow card) 88'	Report		Stadium: Arena Khimki; Attendance: 4,500; Referee: Vladimir Kazmenko

22 August 2010 18	Alania Vladikavkaz	0–0	Anzhi Makhachkala	Vladikavkaz
20:45 MSD (UTC+4)	Bulgaru (yellow card) 88'; Goore (yellow card) 90+'	Report	Josan (yellow card) 44'; Shukurov (yellow card) 54'; Strelkov (yellow card) 59'	Stadium: Republican Spartak Stadium; Attendance: 10,000; Referee: Stanislav Sukhina

30 August 2010 19	Anzhi Makhachkala	1–0	Sibir Novosibirsk	Makhachkala
18:00 MSD (UTC+4)	Bakayev (yellow card) 45'; Tsorayev 51' (pen.); Kébé (yellow card) 79'; Revishvili (yellow card) 90'	Report	Valentić (yellow card) 6'; Klimavičius (yellow card) 13'; Vychodil (yellow card) 52'	Stadium: Dynamo Stadium; Attendance: 11,000; Referee: Aleksandr Kolobaev

12 September 2010 20	Rostov	1–0	Anzhi Makhachkala	Rostov-on-Don
19:45 MSD (UTC+4)	Kalachev 56'; Khagush (yellow card) 82'	Report	Kébé (yellow card) 72'	Stadium: Olimp-2; Attendance: 11,500; Referee: Yuri Baskakov

19 September 2010 21	Anzhi Makhachkala	0–1	Rubin Kazan	Makhachkala
16:15 MSD (UTC+4)		Report	Karadeniz 90+'	Stadium: Dynamo Stadium; Attendance: 12,000; Referee: Sergey Karasev

27 September 2010 22	Krylia Sovetov	3–0	Anzhi Makhachkala	Samara
19:00 MSD (UTC+4)	Samsonov 3'; Ivanov (yellow card) 15' (goal) 29'; Bobyor (yellow card) 24'; Savin 42' (pen.); Đorđević (yellow card) 85'	Report	Tsorayev (yellow card) 11'; Tagirbekov (red card) 15'; Gadzhibekov (yellow card) 35'; Khizaneishvili (yellow card) 41'; Josan (yellow card) 62'	Stadium: Metallurg Stadium; Attendance: 10,100; Referee: Aleksey Eskov

3 October 2010 23	Anzhi Makhachkala	0–1	Spartak Moscow	Makhachkala
16:15 MSD (UTC+4)	Bakayev (yellow card) 74'; Kļava (yellow card) 82'	Report	Sheshukov 22'; Parshivlyuk (yellow card) 46'; Sheshukov (yellow card) 53'; Ari (yellow card) 86'	Stadium: Dynamo Stadium; Attendance: 11,000; Referee: Igor Egorov

17 October 2010 24	Dynamo Moscow	4–0	Anzhi Makhachkala	Khimki
16:15 MSD (UTC+4)	Semshov (yellow card) 10'; Kurányi 37' (pen.); Fernández 40'; Granat (yellow card) 63'; Česnauskis 78'; Epureanu (yellow card) 79'; Ropotan (yellow card) 85'; Voronin 90'	Report	Kébé (yellow card) 61'; Arziani (yellow card) 75'	Stadium: Arena Khimki; Attendance: 5,269; Referee: Aleksandr Gvardis

24 October 2010 25	Anzhi Makhachkala	3–3	Zenit St.Petersburg	Makhachkala
16:30 MSD (UTC+4)	Holenda 4'; Ivanov (yellow card) 47'; Josan 80'; Gadzhibekov (yellow card) 84'; Bakayev 89'; Kļava (yellow card) 90'	Report	Danny 8', 63'; Zyryanov (yellow card) 31', (goal) 40'; Denisov (yellow card) 88'; Bukharov (yellow card) 90'	Stadium: Dynamo Stadium; Attendance: 12,000; Referee: Aleksandr Kolobaev

31 October 2010 26	Anzhi Makhachkala	0–1	Lokomotiv Moscow	Makhachkala
17:15 MSK (UTC+3)	Kébé (yellow card) 42'	Report	Baša (yellow card) 34' (yellow-red card) 45'; Sychev 89'	Stadium: Dynamo Stadium; Attendance: 12,000; Referee: Mikhail Vilkov
Note: Match originally scheduled for game week 12, but matches reversed due to the poor condition of Anzhi's Dynamo Stadium pitch.

6 November 2010 27	Anzhi Makhachkala	1–0	Tom Tomsk	Makhachkala
17:15 MSK (UTC+3)	Strelkov 23'; Holenda (penalty missed) 37'	Report	Gultyayev (yellow card) 29'; Kudryashov (yellow card) 32'; Petković (yellow card) 36'; Kim (yellow card) 75'	Stadium: Dynamo Stadium; Attendance: 8,700; Referee: Aleksei Nikolaev

13 November 2010 28	Terek Grozny	1–3	Anzhi Makhachkala	Grozny
17:45 MSK (UTC+3)	Sadayev 13'; Kobenko (yellow card) 28' (yellow-red card) 38'	Report	Holenda 16'; Josan 62'; Tsorayev 66'	Stadium: Sultan Bilimkhanov Stadium; Attendance: 7,000; Referee: Sergei Karasev

20 November 2010 29	Anzhi Makhachkala	1–2	Saturn Ramenskoye	Makhachkala
15:00 MSK (UTC+3)	Tsorayev 70' (pen.)	Report	Igonin (yellow card) 40'; Mahmudov 51'; Topić 63'	Stadium: Dynamo Stadium; Attendance: 7,500; Referee: Aleksey Eskov

28 November 2010 30	Spartak Nalchik	1–3	Anzhi Makhachkala	Nalchik
14:00 MSK (UTC+3)	Mitrishev 72'	Report	Josan (yellow card) 23'; Streltsov 45'; Kukharchuk 63', 73'	Stadium: Spartak Stadium; Attendance: 7,000; Referee: Vyacheslav Kharlamov

==== League table ====
Pos	Team	Pld	W	D	L	GF	GA	GD	Pts	Qualification or relegation
9	Rostov	30	10	4	16	27	44	−17	34	
10	Saturn	30	8	10	12	27	38	−11	34	Team disbanded after season (Note: Saturn Moscow Oblast were disbanded at the end of the season after amassing debts of RUB 800m.)
11	Anzhi Makhachkala	30	9	6	15	29	39	−10	33	
12	Terek Grozny	30	8	9	13	28	34	−6	33	
13	Krylia Sovetov Samara	30	7	10	13	28	40	−12	31	

Source: RFPL (in Russian)
Rules for classification: 1st points; 2nd matches won; 3rd head-to-head (points, matches won, goal difference, goals scored, away goals scored); 4th goal difference; 5th goals scored; 6th away goals scored; 7th position in previous season or decision game

=== Russian Cup ===
14 July 2010 Round of 32	Pskov-747	1 – 2	Anzhi Makhachkala	Pskov
18:30 MSD (UTC+4)	Krupenin 45+'; A.Susin (yellow card) 90'	Report	Kurbanov (yellow card) 13'; Timonov 22' (pen.); Peković (yellow card) 81'; Krupenin 82' (o.g.)	Stadium: Lokomotiv Stadium; Attendance: 3,150; Referee: Denis Mareyev

Round 16 took place during the 2011–12 season.

== Squad statistics ==
As of match played 28 November 2010

=== Appearances and goals ===
No.	Pos	Nat	Player	Total		Premier League		Russian Cup	
No.	Pos	Nat	Player	Apps	Goals	Apps	Goals	Apps	Goals
1	GK	(Russia) RUS	Ilya Abayev	17	0	16	0	1	0
3	DF	(Latvia) LAT	Oskars Kļava	10	0	7+3	0	0	0
4	DF	(Azerbaijan) AZE	Mahir Shukurov	20	0	20	0	0	0
5	DF	(Senegal) SEN	Ibra Kébé	23	0	23	0	0	0
6	MF	(Russia) RUS	David Tsorayev	29	8	28	8	1	0
7	MF	(Russia) RUS	Kamil Agalarov	27	1	27	1	0	0
8	MF	(Russia) RUS	Andrei Streltsov	17	3	12+4	3	0+1	0
9	FW	(Russia) RUS	Magomed Magomedov	4	0	0+4	0	0	0
13	DF	(Russia) RUS	Rasim Tagirbekov	28	2	28	2	0	0
14	MF	(Russia) RUS	Dmitri Ivanov	14	0	10+4	0	0	0
15	MF	(Moldova) MDA	Nicolae Josan	22	4	18+4	4	0	0
17	FW	(Czech Republic) CZE	Jan Holenda	18	5	16+2	5	0	0
18	FW	(Russia) RUS	Ilya Kukharchuk	12	2	3+9	2	0	0
19	MF	(Georgia (country)) GEO	Zurab Arziani	11	0	5+6	0	0	0
20	MF	(Russia) RUS	Mikhail Bakayev	29	1	28+1	1	0	0
21	FW	(Georgia (country)) GEO	Giorgi Iluridze	6	0	1+4	0	1	0
23	MF	(Russia) RUS	Shamil Burziyev	7	0	0+7	0	0	0
28	FW	(Russia) RUS	Igor Strelkov	13	1	10+3	1	0	0
29	GK	(Georgia (country)) GEO	Nukri Revishvili	14	0	14	0	0	0
31	DF	(Serbia) SRB	Mitar Peković	20	0	19	0	1	0
50	DF	(Russia) RUS	Magomed Abidinov	1	0	0	0	1	0
61	DF	(Russia) RUS	Mahammad Mirzabeyov	1	0	0	0	1	0
63	DF	(Russia) RUS	Ali Gadzhibekov	19	1	19	1	0	0
77	DF	(Georgia (country)) GEO	Otar Khizaneishvili	7	0	6+1	0	0	0
86	MF	(Bulgaria) BUL	Todor Timonov	12	1	1+10	0	1	1
88	DF	(Russia) RUS	Murad Kurbanov	1	0	0	0	1	0
89	DF	(Russia) RUS	Akhmad Magomedov	1	0	0	0	1	0
91	DF	(Russia) RUS	Anvar Ibragimgadzhiyev	1	0	0	0	0+1	0
96	MF	(Russia) RUS	Sharif Mukhammad	3	0	0+2	0	1	0
97	MF	(Russia) RUS	Gadzhi Gadzhiyev	1	0	0	0	0+1	0
Players away from the club on loan:
10	MF	(Georgia (country)) GEO	Gocha Khojava	9	0	4+5	0	0	0
Players who appeared for Anzhi Makhachkala no longer at the club:
2	DF	(Georgia (country)) GEO	Davit Kvirkvelia	13	0	13	0	0	0
32	FW	(Georgia (country)) GEO	Revaz Barabadze	2	0	1+1	0	0	0
70	MF	(Russia) RUS	Eldar Mamayev	8	1	1+6	1	1	0

=== Goal scorers ===
Place	Position	Nation	Number	Name	Premier League	Russian Cup	Total
1	MF	(Russia)	6	David Tsorayev	8	0	8
2	FW	(Czech Republic)	17	Jan Holenda	5	0	5
3	MF	(Moldova)	15	Nicolae Josan	4	0	4
4	MF	(Russia)	8	Andrei Streltsov	3	0	3
5	DF	(Russia)	13	Rasim Tagirbekov	2	0	2
5	FW	(Russia)	18	Ilya Kukharchuk	2	0	2
7	MF	(Russia)	7	Kamil Agalarov	1	0	1
7	MF	(Russia)	70	Eldar Mamayev	1	0	1
7	DF	(Russia)	63	Ali Gadzhibekov	1	0	1
7	FW	(Russia)	28	Igor Strelkov	1	0	1
7	MF	(Russia)	20	Mikhail Bakayev	1	0	1
7	MF	(Bulgaria)	86	Todor Timonov	0	1	1
7				Own goal	0	1	1
				Totals	29	2	31

=== Clean sheets ===
Place	Position	Nation	Number	Name	Premier League	Russian Cup	Total
1	GK	(Russia)	1	Ilya Abayev	5	0	5
2	GK	(Georgia (country))	29	Nukri Revishvili	4	0	4
				TOTALS	9	0	9

=== Disciplinary record ===
Number	Nation	Position	Name	Premier League		Russian Cup		Total	
Number	Nation	Position	Name	Yellow card	Red card	Yellow card	Red card	Yellow card	Red card
3	(Latvia)	DF	Oskars Kļava	2	0	0	0	2	0
4	(Azerbaijan)	DF	Mahir Shukurov	5	1	0	0	5	1
5	(Senegal)	DF	Ibra Kébé	5	0	0	0	5	0
6	(Russia)	MF	David Tsorayev	6	1	0	0	6	1
7	(Russia)	MF	Kamil Agalarov	5	0	0	0	5	0
8	(Russia)	MF	Andrei Streltsov	1	0	0	0	1	0
13	(Russia)	DF	Rasim Tagirbekov	0	1	0	0	0	1
14	(Russia)	MF	Dmitri Ivanov	2	0	0	0	2	0
15	(Moldova)	MF	Nicolae Josan	5	0	0	0	5	0
17	(Czech Republic)	FW	Jan Holenda	3	0	0	0	3	0
19	(Georgia (country))	MF	Zurab Arziani	2	0	0	0	2	0
20	(Russia)	MF	Mikhail Bakayev	6	0	0	0	6	0
23	(Russia)	MF	Shamil Burziyev	1	0	0	0	1	0
28	(Russia)	FW	Igor Strelkov	1	0	0	0	1	0
29	(Georgia (country))	GK	Nukri Revishvili	3	0	0	0	3	0
31	(Serbia)	DF	Mitar Peković	1	0	1	0	2	0
63	(Russia)	DF	Ali Gadzhibekov	4	0	0	0	4	0
77	(Georgia (country))	DF	Otar Khizaneishvili	1	0	0	0	1	0
86	(Bulgaria)	MF	Todor Timonov	1	0	0	0	1	0
88	(Russia)	DF	Murad Kurbanov	0	0	1	0	1	0
Players away on loan:
10	(Georgia (country))	MF	Gocha Khojava	4	0	0	0	4	0
Players who left Anzhi Makhachkala during the season:
2	(Georgia (country))	DF	Davit Kvirkvelia	1	0	0	0	1	0
70	(Russia)	MF	Eldar Mamayev	2	0	0	0	2	0
			Totals	61	3	2	0	65	3
