= 2011–12 FC Anzhi Makhachkala season =

Anzhi Makhachkala
2011–12 season
- Chairman: Suleyman Kerimov
- Manager: Gadzhi Gadzhiev (Until 29 September); Andrei Gordeyev (Caretaker) (29 September - 27 December); Yuri Krasnozhan (27 December - 13 February); Andrei Gordeyev (Caretaker) (13 - 17 February); Guus Hiddink (From 17 February)
- Stadium: Dynamo Stadium
- Premier League: 5th
- 2010–11 Russian Cup: Round of 16
- 2011–12 Russian Cup: Round of 16
- Top goalscorer: League: Samuel Eto'o (13); All: Samuel Eto'o (13)
- Highest home attendance: 15,200 vs Rostov (30 April 2011); 15,200 vs Kuban Krasnodar (13 May 2011); 15,200 vs Zenit St.Petersburg (24 July 2011); 15,200 vs Dynamo Moscow (21 August 2011); 15,200 vs Volga Nizhny Novgorod (11 September 2011); 15,200 vs Spartak Moscow (12 March 2012)
- Lowest home attendance: 2,500 vs Zenit St.Petersburg (1 March 2011)
- Average home league attendance: 14,172 (13 May 2012)
| Home colours | Away colours | Third colours |

The 2011–12 season was Anzhi Makhachkala's second successive season in the highest tier of football in Russia, which they finished in 5th place, qualifying for the second qualifying round of the 2012–13 UEFA Europa League. Anzhi also competed in the Russian Cup where they were knocked out by Dynamo Moscow in the Round of 16.

== Season events ==
On 27 December 2011, Yuri Krasnozhan was appointed as Anzhi's new manager, on a five-year contract. However, on 13 February 2012, Krasnozhan resigned as manager of Anzhi, with Andrei Gordeyev and Roberto Carlos being placed in temporary charge again.

On 17 February, Guus Hiddink was announced as Anzhi's third manager of the season.

== Squad ==
As of match played 13 May 2012

| No. | Name | Nationality | Position | Date of birth (age) | Signed from | Signed in | Contract ends | Apps. | Goals |
Goalkeepers
| 1 | Vladimir Gabulov | (Russia) | GK | 19 October 1983 (aged 28) | Dynamo Moscow | 2011 | | 11 | 0 |
| 31 | Yevgeny Pomazan | (Russia) | GK | 31 January 1989 (aged 23) | CSKA Moscow | 2011 | | 5 | 0 |
| 77 | Aleksandr Makarov | (Russia) | GK | 23 August 1978 (aged 33) | Saturn Ramenskoye | 2011 | | 3 | 0 |
| 91 | Azamat Dzhioev | (Russia) | GK | 6 January 1991 (aged 21) | Spartak Moscow | 2011 | | 0 | 0 |
| | Mehdi Jannatov | (Russia) | GK | 26 January 1992 (aged 20) | Academy | 2010 | | 0 | 0 |
Defenders
| 3 | Roberto Carlos | (Brazil) | DF | 10 April 1973 (aged 39) | Corinthians | 2011 | 2013 | 28 | 5 |
| 4 | Aleksei Igonin | (Russia) | DF | 18 March 1976 (aged 36) | Saturn Ramenskoye | 2011 | | 6 | 0 |
| 13 | Rasim Tagirbekov | (Russia) | DF | 4 May 1984 (aged 28) | Trainee | 2002 | | | |
| 15 | Arseny Logashov | (Russia) | DF | 20 August 1991 (aged 20) | Khimki | 2011 | | 9 | 0 |
| 16 | Viktor Kuzmichyov | (Russia) | DF | 19 March 1992 (aged 20) | Saturn Ramenskoye | 2011 | | 0 | 0 |
| 18 | Benoît Angbwa | (Cameroon) | DF | 1 January 1982 (aged 30) | Saturn Ramenskoye | 2011 | 2014 | 30 | 4 |
| 22 | Christopher Samba | (Republic of the Congo) | DF | 28 March 1984 (aged 28) | Blackburn Rovers | 2012 | 2016 | 10 | 1 |
| 30 | João Carlos | (Brazil) | DF | 1 January 1982 (aged 30) | Genk | 2011 | | 29 | 1 |
| 63 | Ali Gadzhibekov | (Russia) | DF | 6 August 1989 (aged 22) | Trainee | 2006 | | | |
Midfielders
| 6 | Mbark Boussoufa | (Morocco) | MF | 15 August 1984 (aged 27) | Anderlecht | 2011 | | 39 | 7 |
| 7 | Kamil Agalarov | (Russia) | MF | 11 June 1988 (aged 23) | Dagdizel Kaspiysk | 2008 | | | |
| 8 | Jucilei | (Brazil) | MF | 6 April 1988 (aged 24) | Corinthians | 2011 | | 29 | 1 |
| 20 | Mehdi Carcela | (Morocco) | MF | 1 July 1989 (aged 22) | Standard Liège | 2011 | | 8 | 0 |
| 21 | Sharif Mukhammad | (Russia) | MF | 21 March 1990 (aged 22) | Dynamo Makhachkala | 2010 | | 8 | 0 |
| 25 | Odil Ahmedov | (Uzbekistan) | MF | 25 November 1987 (aged 24) | Pakhtakor Tashkent | 2011 | | 46 | 2 |
| 27 | Oleg Shatov | (Russia) | MF | 29 July 1990 (aged 21) | Ural Sverdlovsk | 2012 | | 7 | 0 |
| 61 | Magomed Mirzabekov | (Russia) | MF | 16 November 1990 (aged 21) | Torpedo-ZIL Moscow | 2010 | | 2 | 0 |
| 81 | Yuri Zhirkov | (Russia) | MF | 20 August 1983 (aged 28) | Chelsea | 2011 | | 24 | 1 |
| 88 | Aleksei Ivanov | (Russia) | MF | 1 September 1981 (aged 30) | Saturn Ramenskoye | 2011 | | 26 | 1 |
| 90 | Makhach Gadzhiyev | (Russia) | MF | 18 October 1987 (aged 24) | Saturn Ramenskoye | 2011 | | 24 | 3 |
| | Georgy Gabulov | (Russia) | MF | 4 September 1988 (aged 23) | Alania Vladikavkaz | 2012 | | 0 | 0 |
Forwards
| 10 | Shamil Lakhiyalov | (Russia) | FW | 28 October 1979 (aged 32) | Krasnodar | 2011 | | | |
| 17 | Jan Holenda | (Czech Republic) | FW | 22 August 1985 (aged 26) | Sparta Prague | 2010 | | 43 | 11 |
| 89 | Aleksandr Prudnikov | (Russia) | FW | 24 February 1989 (aged 23) | loan from Spartak Moscow | 2011 | 2012 | 21 | 3 |
| 99 | Samuel Eto'o | (Cameroon) | FW | 10 March 1981 (aged 31) | Inter Milan | 2011 | 2014 | 23 | 13 |
Players away on loan
| 14 | Dmitri Ivanov | (Russia) | MF | 14 February 1987 (aged 25) | Rostov | 2008 | | | |
| 22 | Miro Slavov | (Ukraine) | FW | 8 September 1990 (aged 21) | Girondins de Bordeaux | 2010 | | 2 | 0 |
| | Badavi Huseynov | (Azerbaijan) | DF | 11 July 1991 (aged 20) | Dagdizel Kaspiysk | 2010 | | 0 | 0 |
| | Oskars Kļava | (Latvia) | DF | 8 August 1983 (aged 28) | Liepājas Metalurgs | 2010 | | 10 | 0 |
| | Irakli Klimiashvili | (Georgia (country)) | MF | 30 May 1988 (aged 23) | WIT Georgia | 2011 | | 0 | 0 |
| | Ilya Kukharchuk | (Russia) | MF | 2 August 1990 (aged 21) | Rubin Kazan | 2010 | | 12 | 2 |
| | Arafat Djako | (Togo) | FW | 10 November 1988 (aged 23) | Hapoel Acre | 2010 | | 0 | 0 |
Players that left during the season
| 1 | Nukri Revishvili | (Georgia (country)) | GK | 2 March 1987 (aged 25) | Rubin Kazan | 2010 | | 43 | 0 |
| 4 | Mahir Shukurov | (Azerbaijan) | DF | 12 December 1982 (aged 29) | Inter Baku | 2010 | | 20 | 0 |
| 5 | Ibra Kébé | (Senegal) | MF | 24 December 1978 (aged 33) | Spartak Nizhny Novgorod | 2006 | | | |
| 9 | Diego Tardelli | (Brazil) | FW | 10 May 1985 (aged 27) | Atlético Mineiro | 2011 | | 14 | 0 |
| 19 | Zurab Arziani | (Georgia (country)) | MF | 19 October 1987 (aged 24) | Olimpi Rustavi | 2007 | | | |
| 20 | Mikhail Bakayev | (Russia) | MF | 5 August 1987 (aged 24) | Alania Vladikavkaz | 2009 | | | |
| 21 | Giorgi Iluridze | (Georgia (country)) | FW | 20 February 1992 (aged 20) | Dinamo Tbilisi | 2010 | | 6 | 0 |
| 22 | Balázs Dzsudzsák | (Hungary) | MF | 23 December 1986 (aged 25) | PSV Eindhoven | 2011 | | 10 | 0 |
| 33 | Isah Eliakwu | (Nigeria) | FW | 25 October 1985 (aged 26) | Varese | 2010 | | 4 | 0 |

== Transfers ==
=== In ===
| Date | Position | Nationality | Name | From | Fee | Ref. |
|---|---|---|---|---|---|---|
| 1 January 2011 | GK | (Russia) | Aleksandr Makarov | Saturn Moscow Oblast | Undisclosed | |
| 1 January 2011 | DF | (Russia) | Mikhail Pometsko | Unattached | Free | |
| 1 January 2011 | DF | (Cameroon) | Benoît Angbwa | Saturn Moscow Oblast | Undisclosed | |
| 1 January 2011 | MF | (Georgia (country)) | Irakli Klimiashvili | WIT Georgia | Undisclosed | |
| 1 January 2011 | MF | (Russia) | Makhach Gadzhiyev | Saturn Moscow Oblast | Undisclosed | |
| 1 January 2011 | MF | (Russia) | Viktor Kuzmichyov | Saturn Moscow Oblast | Undisclosed | |
| 24 January 2011 | DF | (Brazil) | João Carlos | KRC Genk | Undisclosed | |
| 6 February 2011 | MF | (Russia) | Aleksei Ivanov | Saturn Moscow Oblast | Undisclosed | |
| 12 February 2011 | DF | (Brazil) | Roberto Carlos | Corinthians | Undisclosed | |
| 22 February 2011 | MF | (Brazil) | Jucilei | Corinthians | Undisclosed | |
| 1 March 2011 | MF | (Russia) | Shamil Lakhiyalov | Krasnodar | Undisclosed | |
| 7 March 2011 | MF | (Morocco) | Mbark Boussoufa | Anderlecht | Undisclosed | |
| 8 March 2011 | FW | (Brazil) | Diego Tardelli | Atlético Mineiro | Undisclosed | |
| 6 May 2011 | FW | (Togo) | Arafat Djako | Hapoel Acre | Undisclosed | |
| 1 July 2011 | MF | (Hungary) | Balázs Dzsudzsák | PSV Eindhoven | Undisclosed | |
| 1 July 2011 | MF | (Uzbekistan) | Odil Ahmedov | Pakhtakor Tashkent | Undisclosed | |
| 1 July 2011 | FW | (Russia) | Islamnur Abdulavov | Dynamo Kyiv | Undisclosed | |
| 28 July 2011 | DF | (Russia) | Arseniy Logashov | Khimki | Undisclosed | |
| 6 August 2011 | DF | (Russia) | Yuri Zhirkov | Chelsea | Undisclosed | |
| 13 August 2011 | FW | (Russia) | Aleksandr Prudnikov | Spartak Moscow | Undisclosed | |
| 23 August 2011 | FW | (Cameroon) | Samuel Eto'o | Inter Milan | Undisclosed | |
| 26 August 2011 | MF | (Russia) | Seyt-Daut Garakoyev | Lokomotiv Moscow | Undisclosed | |
| 26 August 2011 | MF | (Russia) | Islam Suleymanov | Zenit St.Petersburg | Undisclosed | |
| 30 August 2011 | GK | (Russia) | Vladimir Gabulov | Dynamo Moscow | Undisclosed | |
| 30 August 2011 | MF | (Morocco) | Mehdi Carcela | Standard Liège | Undisclosed | |
| 31 August 2011 | GK | (Russia) | Yevgeny Pomazan | CSKA Moscow | Undisclosed | |
| 3 February 2012 | MF | (Russia) | Oleg Shatov | Ural Sverdlovsk Oblast | Undisclosed | |
| 24 February 2012 | MF | (Russia) | Georgy Gabulov | Alania Vladikavkaz | Undisclosed | |
| 25 February 2012 | DF | (Republic of the Congo) | Christopher Samba | Blackburn Rovers | Undisclosed | |

=== Loans in ===
| Date from | Position | Nationality | Name | From | Date to | Ref. |
|---|---|---|---|---|---|---|
| 9 February 2011 | MF | (Uzbekistan) | Odil Ahmedov | Pakhtakor Tashkent | 30 June 2011 | |
| 10 March 2011 | FW | (Russia) | Aleksandr Prudnikov | Spartak Moscow | 30 June 2012 | |

=== Out ===
| Date | Position | Nationality | Name | To | Fee | Ref. |
|---|---|---|---|---|---|---|
| 1 January 2011 | GK | (Russia) | Ilya Abayev | Volga Nizhny Novgorod | Undisclosed | |
| 1 January 2011 | GK | (Ukraine) | Leonid Musin | Ural Sverdlovsk Oblast | Undisclosed | |
| 1 January 2011 | DF | (Russia) | Akhmad Magomedov | Dagdizel Kaspiysk | Undisclosed | |
| 1 January 2011 | DF | (Russia) | Gamzat Omarov | Dagdizel Kaspiysk | Undisclosed | |
| 1 January 2011 | MF | (Georgia (country)) | Gocha Khojava | Volga Nizhny Novgorod | Undisclosed | |
| 1 January 2011 | MF | (Russia) | Shamil Alimagomayev | Mashuk-KMV Pyatigorsk | Undisclosed | |
| 1 January 2011 | MF | (Russia) | Dmitri Vasilyev | Luch-Energiya Vladivostok | Undisclosed | |
| 1 January 2011 | MF | (Russia) | David Tsorayev | Kuban Krasnodar | Undisclosed | |
| 1 January 2011 | FW | (Georgia (country)) | Otar Martsvaladze | Volga Nizhny Novgorod | Undisclosed | |
| 1 January 2011 | FW | (Russia) | Ruslan Aliyev | Dagdizel Kaspiysk | Undisclosed | |
| 21 January 2011 | MF | (Russia) | Andrei Streltsov | Dynamo Bryansk | Undisclosed | |
| 1 March 2011 | MF | (Bulgaria) | Todor Timonov | Botev Plovdiv | Undisclosed | |
| 1 April 2011 | DF | (Azerbaijan) | Mahir Shukurov | Gabala | Undisclosed | |
| 2 August 2011 | MF | (Georgia (country)) | Zurab Arziani | Volga Nizhny Novgorod | Undisclosed | |
| 3 August 2011 | MF | (Russia) | Mikhail Bakayev | Alania Vladikavkaz | Undisclosed | |
| 23 December 2011 | GK | (Georgia (country)) | Nukri Revishvili | Krasnodar | Undisclosed | |
| 4 January 2012 | FW | (Brazil) | Diego Tardelli | Al-Gharafa | Undisclosed | |
| 16 January 2012 | MF | (Hungary) | Balázs Dzsudzsák | Dynamo Moscow | Undisclosed | |
| 1 February 2012 | FW | (Georgia (country)) | Giorgi Iluridze | Dila Gori | Undisclosed | |

=== Loans out ===
| Date from | Position | Nationality | Name | To | Date to | Ref. |
|---|---|---|---|---|---|---|
| 10 February 2011 | MF | (Georgia (country)) | Zurab Arziani | Dinamo Tbilisi | 30 June 2011 | |
| 1 April 2011 | MF | (Russia) | Mikhail Pometsko | Dagdizel Kaspiysk | 30 June 2012 | |
| 14 April 2011 | MF | (Russia) | Dmitri Ivanov | Dagdizel Kaspiysk | 31 December 2011 | |
| 13 July 2011 | FW | (Ukraine) | Miro Slavov | Metalurh Donetsk | 30 June 2012 | |
| 1 August 2011 | DF | (Azerbaijan) | Badavi Huseynov | Sumgayit City | 31 August 2012 | |
| 1 August 2011 | DF | (Latvia) | Oskars Kļava | Khimki | 31 December 2011 | |
| 1 August 2011 | DF | (Russia) | Arseny Logashov | Fakel Voronezh | 31 December 2011 | |
| 1 August 2011 | FW | (Togo) | Arafat Djako | Gaziantepspor | 1 December 2011 | |
| 1 August 2011 | MF | (Georgia (country)) | Irakli Klimiashvili | Pakhtakor Tashkent | 30 June 2012 | |
| 31 August 2011 | GK | (Russia) | Vladimir Gabulov | CSKA Moscow | 31 December 2011 | |
| 1 January 2012 | FW | (Togo) | Arafat Djako | Al-Arabi | 30 June 2012 | |
| 22 February 2012 | FW | (Russia) | Ilya Kukharchuk | Ural Sverdlovsk Oblast | 30 June 2012 | |

=== Released ===
| Date | Position | Nationality | Name | Joined | Date | Ref. |
|---|---|---|---|---|---|---|
| 31 December 2011 | DF | (Senegal) | Ibra Kébé | Retired | | |
| 31 December 2011 | FW | (Nigeria) | Isah Eliakwu | Gallipoli | 1 December 2012 | |
| 30 June 2012 | DF | (Brazil) | Roberto Carlos | Retired | | |
| 30 June 2012 | DF | (Russia) | Aleksei Igonin | Retired | | |
| 30 June 2012 | DF | (Russia) | Mahammad Mirzabeyov | Sumgayit | | |
| 30 June 2012 | MF | (Georgia (country)) | Irakli Klimiashvili | Dila Gori | | |
| 30 June 2012 | FW | (Togo) | Arafat Djako | Inter Baku | 8 September 2012 | |

== Friendlies ==
| 7 July 2011 | Anzhi Makhachkala | 0 - 0 | Zadar | Söchau, Austria |
| 18:30 CET | | Report |

| 10 July 2011 | Anzhi Makhachkala | 1 - 2 | Comercial | Bad Blumau, Austria |
| 18:30 CET | Roberto Carlos 65' (pen.); Igonin (yellow card) 79' (red card) | Report | Rossato 31'; Luan 79' |

| 11 July 2011 | Anzhi Makhachkala | 4 - 3 | Baník Ostrava | Gleisdorf, Austria |
| 18:30 CET | Angbwa 33'; Holenda 35'; Agalarov 42'; Prudnikov 55' | Report | Marek 52'; Tomanica 75'; Vaněk 77' (pen.) |

| 14 July 2011 | Schalke 04 | 3 - 1 | Anzhi Makhachkala | Bad Waltersdorf, Austria |
| 18:30 CET | Huntelaar 7'; Höger 60'; Morávek 88' | Report | Holenda 30' |

| 6 September 2011 | Anzhi Makhachkala | 1 - 3 | Aktobe | Kratovo, Moscow Oblast |
| 17:00 MSK | Eliakwu 59' | Report | Smakov 36' (pen.); Mane 45'; Đilas 85' |

| 11 October 2011 | Anzhi Makhachkala | 1 - 1 | Torpedo Vladimir | Kratovo, Moscow Oblast |
| 16:00 MSK | Eliakwu 50'; Gadzhiyev (red card) 90' | Report | Tsukanov 54' |

=== 2012 Copa del Sol ===
| Pos | Team | Pld | W | PKW | PKL | L | GF | GA | GD | Pts |
|---|---|---|---|---|---|---|---|---|---|---|
| 1 | (Denmark) Copenhagen | 3 | 2 | 0 | 1 | 0 | 4 | 1 | +3 | 7 |
| 2 | (Russia) Anzhi | 3 | 1 | 2 | 0 | 0 | 4 | 3 | +1 | 7 |
| 3 | (Ukraine) Shakhtar Donetsk | 3 | 1 | 1 | 0 | 1 | 3 | 4 | −1 | 5 |
| 4 | (Norway) Aalesund | 3 | 1 | 0 | 1 | 1 | 7 | 7 | 0 | 4 |
| 5 | (Sweden) Kalmar | 3 | 1 | 0 | 0 | 2 | 4 | 4 | 0 | 3 |
| 6 | (Norway) Tromsø | 3 | 0 | 0 | 1 | 2 | 0 | 3 | −3 | 1 |

| 30 January 2012 | Tromsø (Norway) | 0–0 (2–4 p) | (Russia) Anzhi Makhachkala | La Manga Stadium, La Manga |
| 16:00 CET | | Report | | Attendance: 1200; Referee: Anders Poulsen (Denmark) |
| | Penalties |
| | Björck (penalty missed); Mbodj (penalty scored); Ciss (penalty missed); Andersen (penalty scored) | | (penalty missed) Eto'o; (penalty scored) Roberto Carlos; (penalty scored) Prudnikov; (penalty scored) João Carlos; (penalty scored) Jucilei |

| 2 February 2012 | Copenhagen (Denmark) | 1–1 (2–4 p) | (Russia) Anzhi Makhachkala | La Manga Stadium, La Manga |
| 16:00 CET | Abdellaoue 78' | Summary | Eto'o 32' (pen.) |

| 5 February 2012 | Anzhi Makhachkala (Russia) | 3–2 | (Norway) Aalesund | La Manga Stadium, La Manga |
| 13:00 CET | Ivanov 11'; Eto'o 42'; Arnefjord 90' (o.g.) | | James 50'; Lakhiyalov 78' (o.g.) |

== Competitions ==
=== Premier League ===
==== First phase ====
===== Results summary =====
| Overall | | | | | | | | Home | | | | | | Away | | | | | |
| Pld | W | D | L | GF | GA | GD | Pts | W | D | L | GF | GA | GD | W | D | L | GF | GA | GD |
|---|---|---|---|---|---|---|---|---|---|---|---|---|---|---|---|---|---|---|---|
| 30 | 13 | 9 | 8 | 38 | 32 | +6 | 48 | 9 | 3 | 3 | 22 | 14 | +8 | 4 | 6 | 5 | 16 | 18 | −2 |

Last updated: 5 November 2011.
Source: See Results

===== Results by round =====
| Round | 1 | 2 | 3 | 4 | 5 | 6 | 7 | 8 | 9 | 10 | 11 | 12 | 13 | 14 | 15 | 16 | 17 | 18 | 19 | 20 | 21 | 22 | 23 | 24 | 25 | 26 | 27 | 28 | 29 | 30 |
|---|---|---|---|---|---|---|---|---|---|---|---|---|---|---|---|---|---|---|---|---|---|---|---|---|---|---|---|---|---|---|
| Ground | H | A | H | A | H | A | H | A | H | A | A | H | A | A | A | A | H | A | H | A | H | A | H | A | H | H | A | H | H | H |
| Result | D | L | W | D | W | D | W | W | D | L | W | W | L | D | W | D | L | W | W | L | W | D | W | L | D | L | D | L | W | W |
| Position | 9 | 13 | 11 | 9 | 6 | 7 | 5 | 4 | 5 | 7 | 4 | 2 | 3 | 4 | 4 | 4 | 6 | 4 | 4 | 6 | 4 | 5 | 4 | 7 | 7 | 8 | 8 | 8 | 8 | 8 |

Updated to match(es) played on 5 November 2011. Source: See Results
A = Away; H = Home; W = Win; D = Draw; L = Loss

===== Results =====
| 12 March 2011 1 | Anzhi Makhachkala | 0–0 | Krasnodar | Makhachkala |
| 14:00 MSK (UTC+3) | Lakhiyalov (yellow card) 50'; Ahmedov (yellow card) 56' | Report | Gorodov (yellow card) 90+3' | Stadium: Dynamo Stadium; Attendance: 13,500; Referee: Vladimir Pettay |

| 20 March 2011 2 | Zenit St.Petersburg | 2–0 | Anzhi Makhachkala | Saint Petersburg |
| 19:30 MSK (UTC+3) | Shirokov 6'; Ionov (yellow card) 37'; Lazović 45+2' | Report | | Stadium: Petrovsky Stadium; Attendance: 19,000; Referee: Aleksei Eskov |

| 3 April 2011 3 | Anzhi Makhachkala | 1–0 | Rubin Kazan | Makhachkala |
| 16:15 MSK (UTC+4) | Holenda 7'; Agalarov (yellow card) 60'; Revishvili (yellow card) 65'; Jucilei (yellow card) 87'; Gadzhibekov (yellow card) 90' | Report | Navas (yellow card) 31' | Stadium: Dynamo Stadium; Attendance: 12,500; Referee: Aleksei Nikolaev |

| 11 April 2011 4 | Tom Tomsk | 0–0 | Anzhi Makhachkala | Tomsk |
| 15:00 MSK (UTC+4) | | Report | | Stadium: Trud Stadium; Attendance: 11,000; Referee: Yuri Baskakov |

| 17 April 2011 5 | Anzhi Makhachkala | 2–1 | Spartak Moscow | Makhachkala |
| 19:30 MSK (UTC+4) | Holenda 29'; Angbwa 75'; Boussoufa (yellow card) 88'; Gadzhiyev (yellow card) 90+'; Bakayev (yellow card) 90+' | Report | D.Kombarov 7'; Sheshukov (yellow card) 74'; Rojo (yellow card) 88' | Stadium: Dynamo Stadium; Attendance: 14,800; Referee: Vladimir Pettay |

| 25 April 2011 6 | Dynamo Moscow | 2–2 | Anzhi Makhachkala | Khimki |
| 19:30 MSK (UTC+4) | Smolov (yellow card) 15'; Semshov (yellow card) 30' (yellow-red card) 57'; Fernández (yellow card) 55'; Kokorin 63'; Samedov (yellow card) 77'; Misimović 88' (pen.) | Report | Tagirbekov (yellow card) 30'; Revishvili (yellow card) 30'; Boussoufa (yellow card) 30'; Roberto Carlos 58' (pen.); Ahmedov (yellow card) 65'; Angbwa 72'; Ivanov (yellow card) 87' | Stadium: Arena Khimki; Attendance: 12,375; Referee: Igor Egorov |

| 30 April 2011 7 | Anzhi Makhachkala | 1–0 | Rostov | Makhachkala |
| 14:15 MSK (UTC+4) | Gadzhibekov (yellow card) 21'; Roberto Carlos 57' (pen.); Tagirbekov (yellow card) 81' | Report | Ivanov (yellow card) 52'; Gațcan (yellow card) 63'; Proshyn (red card) 82'; Adamov (yellow card) 90' | Stadium: Dynamo Stadium; Attendance: 15,200; Referee: Stanislav Sukhina |

| 6 May 2011 8 | Volga Nizhny Novgorod | 1–2 | Anzhi Makhachkala | Nizhny Novgorod |
| 16:15 MSK (UTC+4) | Shulenin 29'; Khazov (yellow card) 90+' | Report | Holenda 55'; Lakhiyalov 67' | Stadium: Lokomotiv Stadium; Attendance: 9,500; Referee: Maksim Layushkin |

| 13 May 2011 9 | Anzhi Makhachkala | 0–0 | Kuban Krasnodar | Makhachkala |
| 18:30 MSK (UTC+4) | Kébé (yellow card) 90+2' | Report | Zhavnerchik (yellow card) 41'; Tsorayev (yellow card) 60' | Stadium: Dynamo Stadium; Attendance: 15,200; Referee: Sergei Karasev |

| 20 May 2011 10 | Terek Grozny | 1–0 | Anzhi Makhachkala | Grozny |
| 16:00 MSK (UTC+4) | Georgiev 45'; Utsiyev (yellow card) 90' | Report | Holenda (yellow card) 20'; Gadzhibekov (yellow card) 31'; Jucilei (yellow card) 71'; Tagirbekov (yellow card) 88' | Stadium: Akhmat-Arena; Attendance: 30,000; Referee: Yuri Baskakov |

| 27 May 2011 11 | Lokomotiv Moscow | 1–2 | Anzhi Makhachkala | Moscow |
| 19:15 MSK (UTC+4) | Sychev 90' (pen.) | Report | Tagirbekov 47'; Boussoufa 80'; João Carlos (yellow card) 84' (yellow-red card) 90' | Stadium: Lokomotiv Stadium; Attendance: 15,569; Referee: Vladimir Pettay |

| 10 June 2011 12 | Anzhi Makhachkala | 2–0 | Spartak Nalchik | Makhachkala |
| 17:45 MSK (UTC+4) | Roberto Carlos 20'; Holenda 61' (yellow card) 69' | Report | Siradze (yellow card) 66' | Stadium: Dynamo Stadium; Attendance: 14,800; Referee: Yuri Baskakov |

| 14 June 2011 13 | CSKA Moscow | 3–0 | Anzhi Makhachkala | Khimki |
| 20:00 MSK (UTC+4) | Vágner Love 5' (yellow card) 40'; Honda 27'; Mamayev (yellow card) 33'; Aldonin (yellow card) 53'; Dzagoev 61' | Report | Angbwa (yellow card) 21'; Boussoufa (yellow card) 33' | Stadium: Arena Khimki; Attendance: 7,000; Referee: Vyacheslav Popov |

| 18 June 2011 14 | Amkar Perm | 0–0 | Anzhi Makhachkala | Perm |
| 16:30 MSK (UTC+4) | Fedoriv (yellow card) 32'; Burmistrov (yellow card) 90+3' | Report | | Stadium: Zvezda Stadium; Attendance: 8,800; Referee: Sergei Karasev |

| 22 June 2011 15 | Krylia Sovetov | 0–3 | Anzhi Makhachkala | Samara |
| 19:30 MSK (UTC+4) | Đorđević (yellow card) 79' | Report | Agalarov 6' (yellow card) 34'; Gadzhiyev 18'; Angbwa 63' | Stadium: Metallurg Stadium; Attendance: 16,350; Referee: Almir Kayumov |

| 26 June 2011 16 | Krasnodar | 2–2 | Anzhi Makhachkala | Krasnodar |
| 21:00 MSK (UTC+4) | Abreu (yellow card) 4' (goal) 61'; Kulchy (yellow card) 55'; Yerokhin (yellow card) 56'; Mikheyev 68' (yellow card) 90+' | Report | João Carlos (yellow card) 33'; Ivanov 38'; Prudnikov (yellow card) 63'; Gadzhiyev (yellow card) 71'; Angbwa 79' | Stadium: Kuban Stadium; Attendance: 10,800; Referee: Vladislav Bezborodov |

| 24 July 2011 17 | Anzhi Makhachkala | 0–1 | Zenit St.Petersburg | Makhachkala |
| 21:00 MSK (UTC+4) | Tagirbekov (yellow card) 18'; Revishvili (yellow card) 81' | Report | Kerzhakov 80' | Stadium: Dynamo Stadium; Attendance: 15,200; Referee: Maksim Layushkin |

| 30 July 2011 18 | Rubin Kazan | 0–3 | Anzhi Makhachkala | Kazan |
| 17:45 MSK (UTC+4) | Bocchetti (yellow card) 53'; Ansaldi (yellow card) 90+' | Report | Gadzhiyev 51'; Prudnikov 66'; Boussoufa 80' (pen.) | Stadium: Central Stadium; Attendance: 18,520; Referee: Aleksei Nikolaev |

| 6 August 2011 19 | Anzhi Makhachkala | 2–0 | Tomsk | Makhachkala |
| 18:45 MSK (UTC+4) | Prudnikov 17'; Angbwa (yellow card) 66'; Gadzhiyev 82' | Report | Balyaikin (yellow card) 15' | Stadium: Dynamo Stadium; Attendance: 15,100; Referee: Sergei Karasev |

| 14 August 2011 20 | Spartak Moscow | 3–0 | Anzhi Makhachkala | Moscow |
| 19:15 MSK (UTC+4) | Ari 35' (yellow card) 42'; D.Kombarov 44'; Kozlov 72'; Carioca (yellow card) 83'; Welliton (yellow card) 84' | Report | Tagirbekov (yellow card) 11' | Stadium: Luzhniki Stadium; Attendance: 23,291; Referee: Mikhail Vilkov |

| 21 August 2011 21 | Anzhi Makhachkala | 2–1 | Dynamo Moscow | Makhachkala |
| 21:00 MSK (UTC+4) | Boussoufa 22'; Prudnikov 72' | Report | Yusupov (yellow card) 41'; Voronin 44'; Kurányi (yellow card) 55'; Lomić (yellow card) 70'; Ropotan (yellow card) 83'; Granat (yellow card) 85' | Stadium: Dynamo Stadium; Attendance: 15,200; Referee: Vladislav Bezborodov |

| 27 August 2011 22 | Rostov | 1–1 | Anzhi Makhachkala | Rostov-on-Don |
| 20:00 MSK (UTC+4) | Okoronkwo (yellow card) 5'; Cociș (yellow card) 59'; Kalachev 72' (yellow card) 82' | Report | Agalarov (yellow card) 74'; Eto'o 80'; Zhirkov (yellow card) 82' | Stadium: Olimp-2; Attendance: 15,840; Referee: Igor Egorov |

| 11 September 2011 23 | Anzhi Makhachkala | 2–1 | Volga Nizhny Novgorod | Makhachkala |
| 20:30 MSK (UTC+4) | Angbwa (yellow card) 15'; Eto'o 17' (yellow card) 39'; Roberto Carlos 59' | Report | Pleșan 4'; Bondar (yellow card) 20'; Belozyorov (yellow card) 44'; Tursunov (yellow card) 61'; Malyarov (yellow card) 82' Ajinjal (yellow card) 88' | Stadium: Dynamo Stadium; Attendance: 15,200; Referee: Alexander Yegorov |

| 18 September 2011 24 | Kuban Krasnodar | 1–0 | Anzhi Makhachkala | Krasnodar |
| 20:45 MSK (UTC+4) | Bucur 14'; Lolo (yellow card) 52' | Report | João Carlos (yellow card) 30' | Stadium: Kuban Stadium; Attendance: 31,527; Referee: Aleksei Eskov |

| 26 September 2011 25 | Anzhi Makhachkala | 2–2 | Terek Grozny | Makhachkala |
| 18:30 MSK (UTC+4) | Eto'o 14'; Agalarov (yellow card) 28'; João Carlos 90+2' | Report | Pavlenko 8'; Vlasov 88' | Stadium: Dynamo Stadium; Attendance: 14,100; Referee: Aleksei Nikolaev |

| 2 October 2011 26 | Anzhi Makhachkala | 0–1 | Lokomotiv Moscow | Makhachkala |
| 19:15 MSK (UTC+4) | Gadzhibekov (yellow card) 45+1'; Eto'o (yellow card) 52'; Ahmedov (yellow card) 63'; Prudnikov (yellow card) 90+4' | Report | Caicedo 5' (yellow card) 36'; Yanbayev (yellow card) 58'; Glushakov (yellow card) 88' | Stadium: Dynamo Stadium; Attendance: 15,000; Referee: Mikhail Vilkov |

| 16 October 2011 27 | Spartak Nalchik | 1–1 | Anzhi Makhachkala | Nalchik |
| 14:45 MSK (UTC+4) | Pylypchuk (yellow card) 32'; Kulikov (yellow card) 81'; Mitrishev 90' | Report | Boussoufa 28' | Stadium: Spartak Stadium; Attendance: 9,000; Referee: Sergei Karasev |

| 23 October 2011 28 | Anzhi Makhachkala | 3–5 | CSKA Moscow | Makhachkala |
| 19:30 MSK (UTC+4) | Eto'o 4'; Jucilei (yellow card) 68'; Holenda 86', 90' | Report | Doumbia 24', 46', 80'; Vágner Love 62'; Dzagoev 82' | Stadium: Dynamo Stadium; Attendance: 15,000; Referee: Vitali Meshkov |

| 27 October 2011 29 | Anzhi Makhachkala | 2–1 | Amkar Perm | Makhachkala |
| 15:00 MSK | Boussoufa (yellow card) 34'; Zhirkov 43'; Gadzhibekov (yellow card) 48'; Eto'o (yellow card) 58' (goal) 81'; Angbwa (yellow card) 68' | Report | Mijailović (yellow card) 20'; Blažić (yellow card) 48'; Volkov (yellow card) 60'; Mikhalyov 90+1' | Stadium: Dynamo Stadium; Attendance: 14,100; Referee: Sergey Lapochkin |

| 5 November 2011 30 | Anzhi Makhachkala | 3–1 | Krylia Sovetov | Makhachkala |
| 16:15 MSK (UTC+4) | Odil Ahmedov (yellow card) 20'; Eto'o 56', 68' (pen.); Lakhiyalov 64' (yellow card) 65'; Gadzhibekov (yellow card) 84' | Report | Yakovlev (yellow card) 17'; Koroman (yellow card) 37'; Vorobyov 55'; Taranov (red card) 67' | Stadium: Dynamo Stadium; Attendance: 14,500; Referee: Alexander Yegorov |

===== League table =====
| Pos | Team | Pld | W | D | L | GF | GA | GD | Pts | Qualification |
|---|---|---|---|---|---|---|---|---|---|---|
| 6 | Kuban Krasnodar | 30 | 14 | 7 | 9 | 38 | 27 | +11 | 49 | Qualification to Championship group |
| 7 | Rubin Kazan | 30 | 13 | 10 | 7 | 40 | 27 | +13 | 49 | Qualification to Championship group |
| 8 | Anzhi Makhachkala | 30 | 13 | 9 | 8 | 38 | 32 | +6 | 48 | Qualification to Championship group |
| 9 | Krasnodar | 30 | 10 | 8 | 12 | 38 | 43 | −5 | 38 | Qualification to Relegation group |
| 10 | Rostov | 30 | 8 | 8 | 14 | 31 | 45 | −14 | 32 | Qualification to Relegation group |

Source: Russian Premier League
Rules for classification: 1) points; 2) number of wins; 3) head-to-head points; 4) number of head-to-head wins; 5) head-to-head goal difference; 6) number of head-to-head goals scored; 7) number of head-to-head away goals scored; 8) goal difference; 9) number of goals scored; 10) number of away goals scored.

==== Championship Group ====
===== Results summary =====
| Overall | | | | | | | | Home | | | | | | Away | | | | | |
| Pld | W | D | L | GF | GA | GD | Pts | W | D | L | GF | GA | GD | W | D | L | GF | GA | GD |
|---|---|---|---|---|---|---|---|---|---|---|---|---|---|---|---|---|---|---|---|
| 14 | 6 | 4 | 4 | 16 | 10 | +6 | 22 | 4 | 1 | 2 | 10 | 6 | +4 | 2 | 3 | 2 | 6 | 4 | +2 |

Last updated: 13 May 2012.
Source: See Results

===== Results by round =====
| Round | 1 | 2 | 3 | 4 | 5 | 6 | 7 | 8 | 9 | 10 | 11 | 12 | 13 | 14 |
|---|---|---|---|---|---|---|---|---|---|---|---|---|---|---|
| Ground | A | H | A | H | A | H | A | A | H | A | H | A | H | H |
| Result | D | W | W | D | L | W | L | D | L | W | W | D | W | L |
| Position | 8 | 7 | 7 | 7 | 7 | 5 | 7 | 7 | 7 | 7 | 5 | 5 | 5 | 5 |

Updated to match(es) played on 13 May 2012. Source: Russian Premier League
A = Away; H = Home; W = Win; D = Draw; L = Loss

===== Results =====
| 20 November 2011 31 | Zenit St.Petersburg | 0–0 | Anzhi Makhachkala | Saint Petersburg |
| 19:30 MSK (UTC+4) | Bukharov (yellow card) 28'; Shirokov (yellow card) 31'; Fayzulin (yellow card) 86' | Report | Gadzhibekov (yellow card) 49'; Jucilei (yellow card) 60'; Zhirkov (yellow card) 60'; Lakhiyalov (yellow card) 62'; João Carlos (yellow card) 71'; Boussoufa (yellow card) 80' (yellow-red card) 81' | Stadium: Petrovsky Stadium; Attendance: 19,100; Referee: Aleksey Eskov |

| 27 November 2011 32 | Anzhi Makhachkala | 2–1 | CSKA Moscow | Makhachkala |
| 19:30 MSK (UTC+4) | Lakhiyalov 46'; Jucilei (yellow card) 64'; Eto'o 88' (pen.); Agalarov (yellow card) 90+' | Report | Nababkin (yellow card) 33'; Šemberas (yellow card) 37'; Vágner Love 47'; Chepchugov (red card) 86'; Mamayev (yellow card) 90+' | Stadium: Dynamo Stadium; Attendance: 15,000; Referee: Stanislav Sukhina |

| 2 March 2012 33 | Dynamo Moscow | 0–1 | Anzhi Makhachkala | Khimki |
| 19:30 MSK (UTC+4) | Semshov (yellow card) 40'; Fernández (yellow card) 90' | Report | Akhmedov (yellow card) 11'; Zhirkov (yellow card) 36'; Gadzhibekov (yellow card) 41'; Tagirbekov (yellow card) 66'; Jucilei 69'; Gabulov (yellow card) 86' | Stadium: Arena Khimki; Attendance: 9,600; Referee: Vladimir Kazmenko |

| 12 March 2012 34 | Anzhi Makhachkala | 0–0 | Spartak Moscow | Makhachkala |
| 19:00 MSK (UTC+4) | Samba (yellow card) 33'; Jucilei (yellow card) 54'; Holenda (yellow card) 90+' | Report | Suchý (yellow card) 32'; Rodri (yellow card) 86' | Stadium: Dynamo Stadium; Attendance: 15,200; Referee: Sergey Lapochkin |

| 18 March 2012 35 | Lokomotiv Moscow | 1–0 | Anzhi Makhachkala | Moscow |
| 16:30 MSK (UTC+4) | Glushakov 73' da Costa (yellow card) 82'; Shishkin (yellow card) 90+1' | Report | Shatov (yellow card) 30'; Akhmedov (yellow card) 68'; Eto'o (yellow card) 83' | Stadium: Lokomotiv Stadium; Attendance: 14,120; Referee: Maxim Layushkin |

| 25 March 2012 36 | Anzhi Makhachkala | 2–0 | Kuban Krasnodar | Makhachkala |
| 19:30 MSK (UTC+4) | Ahmedov 60'; Mukhammad (yellow card) 70'; Boussoufa 80' | Report | Fidler (yellow card) 44'; Tsorayev (yellow card) 56'; Traoré (yellow card) 61'; Rogochiy (yellow card) 73'; Lolo (yellow card) 81'; Sosnin (yellow card) 88'; Pizzelli (yellow card) 90' | Stadium: Dynamo Stadium; Attendance: 14,000; Referee: Eduard Malyi |

| 31 March 2012 37 | Rubin Kazan | 1–0 | Anzhi Makhachkala | Kazan |
| 16:45 MSK (UTC+4) | Martins 50'; Navas (yellow card) 65'; Ansaldi (yellow card) 83' | Report | Boussoufa (yellow card) 87' | Stadium: Central Stadium; Attendance: 19,200; Referee: Stanislav Sukhina |

| 7 April 2012 38 | CSKA Moscow | 0–0 | Anzhi Makhachkala | Moscow |
| 18:30 MSK (UTC+4) | Šemberas (yellow card) 47'; Rahimić (yellow card) 90' | Report | Logashov (yellow card) 27' | Stadium: Luzhniki Stadium; Attendance: 9,560; Referee: Vitali Meshkov |

| 15 April 2012 39 | Anzhi Makhachkala | 0–1 | Dynamo Moscow | Makhachkala |
| 18:30 MSK (UTC+4) | Tagirbekov (yellow card) 40'; Zhirkov (yellow card) 41'; Logashov (yellow card) 51'; Eto'o (yellow card) 69' | Report | Rykov 37' (yellow card) 41'; Semshov (yellow card) 61'; Samedov (yellow card) 80'; Kurányi (yellow card) 83'; Noboa (yellow card) 86'; Fernández (yellow card) 90+'; Shunin (yellow card) 90+' | Stadium: Dynamo Stadium; Attendance: 15,100; Referee: Alexander Yegorov |

| 22 April 2012 40 | Spartak Moscow | 0–3 | Anzhi Makhachkala | Moscow |
| 16:30 MSK (UTC+4) | Carioca (yellow card) 43'; D.Kombarov (yellow card) 54' | Report | Mukhammad (yellow card) 35'; Eto'o 39'; Lakhiyalov 59'; Agalarov (yellow card) 61'; Pareja 70' (o.g.) | Stadium: Luzhniki Stadium; Attendance: 22,212; Referee: Vladislav Bezborodov |

| 28 April 2012 41 | Anzhi Makhachkala | 3–1 | Lokomotiv Moscow | Makhachkala |
| 15:45 MSK (UTC+4) | Burlak 25' (o.g.); Gadzhibekov (yellow card) 36'; Eto'o 64', 90+1' | Report | Glushakov 31' (yellow card) 34'; Belyayev (yellow card) 47'; Ozdoyev (yellow card) 56' | Stadium: Dynamo Stadium; Attendance: 14,800; Referee: Vladimir Kazmenko |

| 2 May 2012 42 | Kuban Krasnodar | 2–2 | Anzhi Makhachkala | Krasnodar |
| 20:45 MSK (UTC+4) | Tsorayev 39'; Zelão (yellow card) 53'; Traoré (yellow card) 59'; Armaș 62' | Report | Boussoufa 14' (yellow card) 65'; Eto'o 22' (yellow card) 53'; João Carlos (yellow card) 61'; Carcela (yellow card) 82' | Stadium: Kuban Stadium; Attendance: 25,560; Referee: Aleksei Nikolaev |

| 6 May 2012 43 | Anzhi Makhachkala | 3–1 | Rubin Kazan | Makhachkala |
| 18:30 MSK (UTC+4) | Boussoufa 13'; Samba 59'; Boussoufa (yellow card) 78'; Eto'o 89' | Report | Dyadyun 1'; Nemov (yellow card) 22'; Kislyak (yellow card) 29'; Bystrov (yellow card) 40'; Dzhalilov (yellow card) 81' | Stadium: Dynamo Stadium; Attendance: 14,950; Referee: Sergei Karasev |

| 13 May 2012 44 | Anzhi Makhachkala | 0–2 | Zenit St.Petersburg | Makhachkala |
| 18:30 MSK (UTC+4) | Eto'o (yellow card) 65' | Report | Bukharov 46'; Luković (yellow card) 66'; Kanunnikov (yellow card) 75'; Alves (yellow card) 78'; Huszti 85' | Stadium: Dynamo Stadium; Attendance: 15,000; Referee: Mikhail Vilkov |

===== League table =====
| Pos | Team | Pld | W | D | L | GF | GA | GD | Pts | Qualification |
|---|---|---|---|---|---|---|---|---|---|---|
| 1 | Zenit St. Petersburg (C) | 44 | 24 | 16 | 4 | 85 | 40 | +45 | 88 | Qualification to Champions League group stage |
| 2 | Spartak Moscow | 44 | 21 | 12 | 11 | 69 | 47 | +22 | 75 | Qualification to Champions League play-off round |
| 3 | CSKA Moscow | 44 | 19 | 16 | 9 | 72 | 47 | +25 | 73 | Qualification to Europa League play-off round |
| 4 | Dynamo Moscow | 44 | 20 | 12 | 12 | 66 | 50 | +16 | 72 | Qualification to Europa League third qualifying round |
| 5 | Anzhi Makhachkala | 44 | 19 | 13 | 12 | 54 | 42 | +12 | 70 | Qualification to Europa League second qualifying round |
| 6 | Rubin Kazan | 44 | 17 | 17 | 10 | 55 | 41 | +14 | 68 | Qualification to Europa League group stage (Note: Rubin have won the 2011–12 Russian Cup and thus have qualified for the group stage of the 2012–13 UEFA Europa League.) |
| 7 | Lokomotiv Moscow | 44 | 18 | 12 | 14 | 59 | 48 | +11 | 66 | |
| 8 | Kuban Krasnodar | 44 | 15 | 16 | 13 | 50 | 45 | +5 | 61 | |

Source: Russian Premier League
Rules for classification: 1) points; 2) number of wins; 3) head-to-head points; 4) number of head-to-head wins; 5) head-to-head goal difference; 6) number of head-to-head goals scored; 7) number of head-to-head away goals scored; 8) goal difference; 9) number of goals scored; 10) number of away goals scored
(C) Champions

=== Russian Cup ===
==== 2010-11 ====
| 1 March 2011 Round of 16 | Anzhi Makhachkala | 2 – 3 | Zenit St.Petersburg | Grozny |
| 18:00 MSK (UTC+3) | A.Ivanov (yellow card) 12'; Agalarov 22'; D.Ivanov 90' | Report | Huszti 12' (pen.); Danny 67'; Lazović 83' | Stadium: Sultan Bilimkhanov Stadium; Attendance: 2,500; Referee: Almir Kayumov |
Note: Match played at the Sultan Bilimkhanov Stadium in Grozny, due to Anzhi's regular home stadium, the Dynamo Stadium, being ruled unfit for the game due to weather conditions.

==== 2011-12 ====
| 17 July 2011 Round of 32 | Volga Ulyanovsk | 0–3 | Anzhi Makhachkala | Ulyanovsk |
| 19:00 MSD (UTC+4) | Sovetkin (yellow card) 64' | Report | Gadzhibekov 30'; Ahmedov 41'; Prudnikov (yellow card) 56'; Roberto Carlos 58'; Revishvili (yellow card) 62' | Stadium: Trud Stadium; Attendance: 10,000; Referee: Sergei Kuznetsov |

| 21 September 2011 Round of 16 | Dynamo Moscow | 1–0 (a.e.t.) | Anzhi Makhachkala | Khimki |
| 19:00 MSD (UTC+4) | Semshov (yellow card) 5'; Lomić (yellow card) 48'; Kokorin 103' (yellow card) 103'; Granat (yellow card) 105'; Sapeta (yellow card) 109'; Wilkshire (yellow card) 110' | Report | Gadzhiyev (yellow card) 1'; Roberto Carlos (yellow card) 5'; Tagirbekov (yellow card) 81'; Prudnikov (yellow card) 100'; Revishvili (yellow card) 103'; Eto'o (yellow card) 118' | Stadium: Arena Khimki; Attendance: 11,262; Referee: Eduard Malyi |

== Squad statistics ==
As of match played 13 May 2012

=== Appearances and goals ===
| No. | Pos | Nat | Player | Total | | Premier League | | 2010–11 Russian Cup | | 2011–12 Russian Cup | |
| No. | Pos | Nat | Player | Apps | Goals | Apps | Goals | Apps | Goals | Apps | Goals |
|---|---|---|---|---|---|---|---|---|---|---|---|
| 1 | GK | (Russia) RUS | Vladimir Gabulov | 11 | 0 | 11 | 0 | 0 | 0 | 0 | 0 |
| 3 | DF | (Brazil) BRA | Roberto Carlos | 28 | 5 | 25 | 4 | 1 | 0 | 2 | 1 |
| 4 | DF | (Russia) RUS | Aleksei Igonin | 6 | 0 | 0+5 | 0 | 0 | 0 | 0+1 | 0 |
| 6 | MF | (Morocco) MAR | Mbark Boussoufa | 39 | 7 | 36+2 | 7 | 0 | 0 | 1 | 0 |
| 7 | MF | (Russia) RUS | Kamil Agalarov | 31 | 2 | 26+3 | 1 | 1 | 1 | 1 | 0 |
| 8 | MF | (Brazil) BRA | Jucilei | 29 | 1 | 25+3 | 1 | 0 | 0 | 1 | 0 |
| 10 | FW | (Russia) RUS | Shamil Lakhiyalov | 32 | 4 | 24+6 | 4 | 0+1 | 0 | 0+1 | 0 |
| 13 | DF | (Russia) RUS | Rasim Tagirbekov | 45 | 1 | 42 | 1 | 1 | 0 | 2 | 0 |
| 15 | DF | (Russia) RUS | Arseny Logashov | 9 | 0 | 8+1 | 0 | 0 | 0 | 0 | 0 |
| 17 | FW | (Czech Republic) CZE | Jan Holenda | 25 | 6 | 17+7 | 6 | 1 | 0 | 0 | 0 |
| 18 | DF | (Cameroon) CMR | Benoît Angbwa | 30 | 4 | 29 | 4 | 0 | 0 | 1 | 0 |
| 20 | MF | (Morocco) MAR | Mehdi Carcela | 8 | 0 | 4+4 | 0 | 0 | 0 | 0 | 0 |
| 21 | MF | (Russia) RUS | Sharif Mukhammad | 5 | 0 | 4+1 | 0 | 0 | 0 | 0 | 0 |
| 22 | DF | (Republic of the Congo) CGO | Christopher Samba | 10 | 1 | 10 | 1 | 0 | 0 | 0 | 0 |
| 25 | MF | (Uzbekistan) UZB | Odil Akhmedov | 46 | 2 | 42+1 | 1 | 1 | 0 | 2 | 1 |
| 27 | MF | (Russia) RUS | Oleg Shatov | 7 | 0 | 3+4 | 0 | 0 | 0 | 0 | 0 |
| 30 | DF | (Brazil) BRA | João Carlos | 29 | 1 | 25+1 | 1 | 1 | 0 | 2 | 0 |
| 31 | GK | (Russia) RUS | Yevgeny Pomazan | 5 | 0 | 5 | 0 | 0 | 0 | 0 | 0 |
| 61 | DF | (Russia) RUS | Mahammad Mirzabeyov | 1 | 0 | 0 | 0 | 0 | 0 | 0+1 | 0 |
| 63 | DF | (Russia) RUS | Ali Gadzhibekov | 42 | 1 | 36+3 | 0 | 1 | 0 | 2 | 1 |
| 77 | GK | (Russia) RUS | Aleksandr Makarov | 3 | 0 | 2+1 | 0 | 0 | 0 | 0 | 0 |
| 81 | MF | (Russia) RUS | Yuri Zhirkov | 24 | 1 | 23 | 1 | 0 | 0 | 1 | 0 |
| 88 | MF | (Russia) RUS | Aleksei Ivanov | 26 | 1 | 11+13 | 1 | 1 | 0 | 1 | 0 |
| 89 | FW | (Russia) RUS | Aleksandr Prudnikov | 21 | 3 | 7+12 | 3 | 0 | 0 | 1+1 | 0 |
| 90 | MF | (Russia) RUS | Makhach Gadzhiyev | 24 | 3 | 11+12 | 3 | 0 | 0 | 1 | 0 |
| 99 | FW | (Cameroon) CMR | Samuel Eto'o | 23 | 13 | 21+1 | 13 | 0 | 0 | 1 | 0 |
Players away from Anzhi Makhachkala on loan:
| 14 | MF | (Russia) RUS | Dmitri Ivanov | 2 | 1 | 0+1 | 0 | 0+1 | 1 | 0 | 0 |
| 22 | FW | (Ukraine) UKR | Miro Slavov | 2 | 0 | 1 | 0 | 1 | 0 | 0 | 0 |
Players who appeared for Anzhi Makhachkala no longer at the club:
| 1 | GK | (Georgia (country)) GEO | Nukri Revishvili | 29 | 0 | 26 | 0 | 1 | 0 | 2 | 0 |
| 5 | MF | (Senegal) SEN | Ibra Kébé | 8 | 0 | 1+6 | 0 | 0 | 0 | 1 | 0 |
| 9 | FW | (Brazil) BRA | Diego Tardelli | 14 | 0 | 7+6 | 0 | 0 | 0 | 0+1 | 0 |
| 20 | MF | (Russia) RUS | Mikhail Bakayev | 8 | 0 | 1+6 | 0 | 1 | 0 | 0 | 0 |
| 22 | MF | (Hungary) HUN | Balázs Dzsudzsák | 10 | 0 | 7+3 | 0 | 0 | 0 | 0 | 0 |
| 33 | FW | (Nigeria) NGR | Isah Eliakwu | 4 | 0 | 3 | 0 | 0 | 0 | 0+1 | 0 |

=== Goal scorers ===
| Place | Position | Nation | Number | Name | Premier League | 2010–11 Russian Cup | 2011–12 Russian Cup | Total |
|---|---|---|---|---|---|---|---|---|
| 1 | FW | (Cameroon) | 99 | Samuel Eto'o | 13 | 0 | 0 | 13 |
| 2 | MF | (Morocco) | 6 | Mbark Boussoufa | 7 | 0 | 0 | 7 |
| 3 | FW | (Czech Republic) | 17 | Jan Holenda | 6 | 0 | 0 | 6 |
| 4 | DF | (Brazil) | 3 | Roberto Carlos | 4 | 0 | 1 | 5 |
| 5 | DF | (Cameroon) | 18 | Benoît Angbwa | 4 | 0 | 0 | 4 |
| 5 | FW | (Russia) | 10 | Shamil Lakhiyalov | 4 | 0 | 0 | 4 |
| 7 | MF | (Russia) | 90 | Makhach Gadzhiyev | 3 | 0 | 0 | 3 |
| 7 | FW | (Russia) | 89 | Aleksandr Prudnikov | 3 | 0 | 0 | 3 |
| 9 | MF | (Russia) | 7 | Kamil Agalarov | 1 | 1 | 0 | 2 |
| 9 | MF | (Uzbekistan) | 25 | Odil Ahmedov | 1 | 0 | 1 | 2 |
| 9 | | | | Own goal | 1 | 0 | 1 | 2 |
| 12 | DF | (Russia) | 13 | Rasim Tagirbekov | 1 | 0 | 0 | 1 |
| 12 | MF | (Russia) | 88 | Aleksei Ivanov | 1 | 0 | 0 | 1 |
| 12 | DF | (Brazil) | 30 | João Carlos | 1 | 0 | 0 | 1 |
| 12 | MF | (Russia) | 81 | Yuri Zhirkov | 1 | 0 | 0 | 1 |
| 12 | MF | (Brazil) | 8 | Jucilei | 1 | 0 | 0 | 1 |
| 12 | DF | (Republic of the Congo) | 22 | Christopher Samba | 1 | 0 | 0 | 1 |
| 12 | MF | (Russia) | 14 | Dmitri Ivanov | 0 | 0 | 1 | 1 |
| 12 | DF | (Russia) | 63 | Ali Gadzhibekov | 0 | 0 | 1 | 1 |
| | | | | TOTALS | 52 | 2 | 3 | 57 |

=== Clean sheets ===
| Place | Position | Nation | Number | Name | Premier League | 2010–11 Russian Cup | 2011–12 Russian Cup | Total |
|---|---|---|---|---|---|---|---|---|
| 1 | GK | (Georgia (country)) | 1 | Nukri Revishvili | 9 | 0 | 1 | 10 |
| 2 | GK | (Russia) | 1 | Vladimir Gabulov | 4 | 0 | 0 | 4 |
| 3 | GK | (Russia) | 77 | Aleksandr Makarov | 1 | 0 | 0 | 1 |
| 3 | GK | (Russia) | 31 | Yevgeny Pomazan | 1 | 0 | 0 | 1 |
| | | | | TOTALS | 15 | 0 | 1 | 16 |

=== Disciplinary record ===
| Number | Nation | Position | Name | Premier League | | 2010–11 Russian Cup | | 2011–12 Russian Cup | | Total | |
| Number | Nation | Position | Name | Yellow card | Red card | Yellow card | Red card | Yellow card | Red card | Yellow card | Red card |
| 1 | (Russia) | GK | Vladimir Gabulov | 1 | 0 | 0 | 0 | 0 | 0 | 1 | 0 |
| 3 | (Brazil) | DF | Roberto Carlos | 0 | 0 | 0 | 0 | 1 | 0 | 1 | 0 |
| 6 | (Morocco) | MF | Mbark Boussoufa | 9 | 1 | 0 | 0 | 0 | 0 | 9 | 1 |
| 7 | (Russia) | MF | Kamil Agalarov | 7 | 0 | 0 | 0 | 0 | 0 | 7 | 0 |
| 8 | (Brazil) | MF | Jucilei | 5 | 0 | 0 | 0 | 0 | 0 | 5 | 0 |
| 10 | (Russia) | FW | Shamil Lakhiyalov | 2 | 0 | 0 | 0 | 0 | 0 | 2 | 0 |
| 13 | (Russia) | DF | Rasim Tagirbekov | 7 | 0 | 0 | 0 | 0 | 0 | 7 | 0 |
| 15 | (Russia) | DF | Arseny Logashov | 3 | 0 | 0 | 0 | 1 | 0 | 4 | 0 |
| 17 | (Czech Republic) | FW | Jan Holenda | 2 | 0 | 0 | 0 | 0 | 0 | 2 | 0 |
| 18 | (Cameroon) | DF | Benoît Angbwa | 5 | 0 | 0 | 0 | 0 | 0 | 5 | 0 |
| 21 | (Russia) | MF | Sharif Mukhammad | 2 | 0 | 0 | 0 | 0 | 0 | 2 | 0 |
| 22 | (Republic of the Congo) | DF | Christopher Samba | 1 | 0 | 0 | 0 | 0 | 0 | 1 | 0 |
| 25 | (Uzbekistan) | MF | Odil Akhmedov | 6 | 0 | 0 | 0 | 0 | 0 | 6 | 0 |
| 27 | (Russia) | MF | Oleg Shatov | 1 | 0 | 0 | 0 | 0 | 0 | 1 | 0 |
| 30 | (Brazil) | DF | João Carlos | 6 | 1 | 0 | 0 | 1 | 0 | 7 | 1 |
| 63 | (Russia) | DF | Ali Gadzhibekov | 9 | 0 | 0 | 0 | 0 | 0 | 9 | 0 |
| 81 | (Russia) | MF | Yuri Zhirkov | 4 | 0 | 0 | 0 | 0 | 0 | 4 | 0 |
| 88 | (Russia) | FW | Aleksei Ivanov | 2 | 0 | 1 | 0 | 0 | 0 | 3 | 0 |
| 89 | (Russia) | FW | Aleksandr Prudnikov | 2 | 0 | 0 | 0 | 2 | 0 | 4 | 0 |
| 90 | (Russia) | FW | Makhach Gadzhiyev | 1 | 0 | 0 | 0 | 1 | 0 | 2 | 0 |
| 99 | (Cameroon) | FW | Samuel Eto'o | 6 | 0 | 0 | 0 | 1 | 0 | 7 | 0 |
Players away on loan:
Players who left Anzhi Makhachkala during the season:
| 1 | (Georgia (country)) | GK | Nukri Revishvili | 3 | 0 | 0 | 0 | 2 | 0 | 5 | 0 |
| 5 | (Senegal) | MF | Ibra Kébé | 1 | 0 | 0 | 0 | 0 | 0 | 1 | 0 |
| 20 | (Russia) | MF | Mikhail Bakayev | 2 | 0 | 0 | 0 | 0 | 0 | 2 | 0 |
| | | | TOTALS | 84 | 1 | 1 | 0 | 9 | 0 | 94 | 1 |
