= Rasim Tagirbekov =

Russian footballer (born 1984)

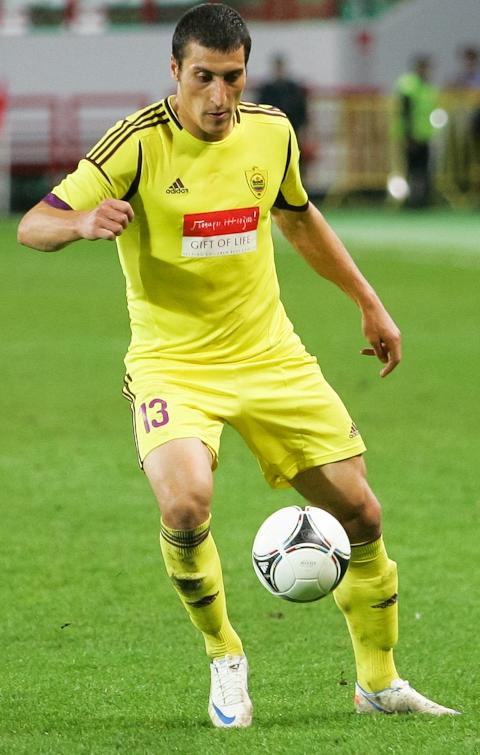
- Tagirbekov with Anzhi Makhachkala in 2012

Personal information
- Full name: Rasim Zagirbekovich Tagirbekov
- Date of birth: 4 May 1984 (age 42)
- Place of birth: Makhachkala, Russian SFSR
- Height: 1.83 m (6 ft 0 in)
- Positions: Defender; midfielder

Senior career*
Years	Team	Apps	(Gls)
2002–2016	Anzhi Makhachkala	307	(20)
2002	→ Dagestani Makhachkala (loan)		
2003	→ Anji-Khazar Makhachkala (loan)		

International career
2011	Russia II	2	(0)
- * Club domestic league appearances and goals

Rasim Zagirbekovich Tagirbekov (Russian: Расим Загирбекович Тагирбеков; Lezgian: Расим Загьирбег хва Тагирбек; born 4 May 1984) is a Russian former professional footballer.

== Career ==
=== Club ===
Tagirbekov made his professional debut in the Russian First Division in 2003 for FC Anzhi Makhachkala.

On 29 March 2016, Tagirbekov left Anzhi Makhachkala after terminating his contract with the club.

== Career statistics ==
=== Club ===
As of match played 12 March 2016

Appearances and goals by club, season and competition
Club	Season	League			National Cup		Continental		Other		Total	
Club	Season	Division	Apps	Goals	Apps	Goals	Apps	Goals	Apps	Goals	Apps	Goals
Anzhi Makhachkala	2003	Russian FNL	1	0	0	0	—		—		1	0
Anzhi Makhachkala	2004	Russian FNL	22	1	0	0	—		—		22	1
Anzhi Makhachkala	2005	Russian FNL	24	1	0	0	—		—		24	1
Anzhi Makhachkala	2006	Russian FNL	29	6	2	0	—		—		31	6
Anzhi Makhachkala	2007	Russian FNL	36	2	0	0	—		—		36	2
Anzhi Makhachkala	2008	Russian FNL	39	2	1	0	—		—		40	2
Anzhi Makhachkala	2009	Russian FNL	37	3	0	0	—		—		37	3
Anzhi Makhachkala	2010	Russian Premier League	28	2	0	0	—		—		28	2
Anzhi Makhachkala	2011–12	Russian Premier League	42	1	3	0	—		—		45	1
Anzhi Makhachkala	2012–13	Russian Premier League	22	2	4	0	9 (Note: Appearances in the UEFA Europa League)	0	—		35	2
Anzhi Makhachkala	2013–14	Russian Premier League	8	0	1	0	3	0	—		12	0
Anzhi Makhachkala	2014–15	Russian FNL	11	0	0	0	—		—		11	0
Anzhi Makhachkala	2015–16	Russian Premier League	9	0	1	0	—		0 (Note: Appearances in the Russian Premier League relegation play-offs)	0	0	0
Anzhi Makhachkala	Total		307	20	12	0	12	0	0	0	331	20
Career total			307	20	12	0	12	0	0	0	331	20

== Honours ==
Anzhi Makhachkala

- Russian First Division (1): 2009

Individual

- Russian First Division best defender: 2009.
