= Mitar Peković =

Serbian footballer (born 1981)

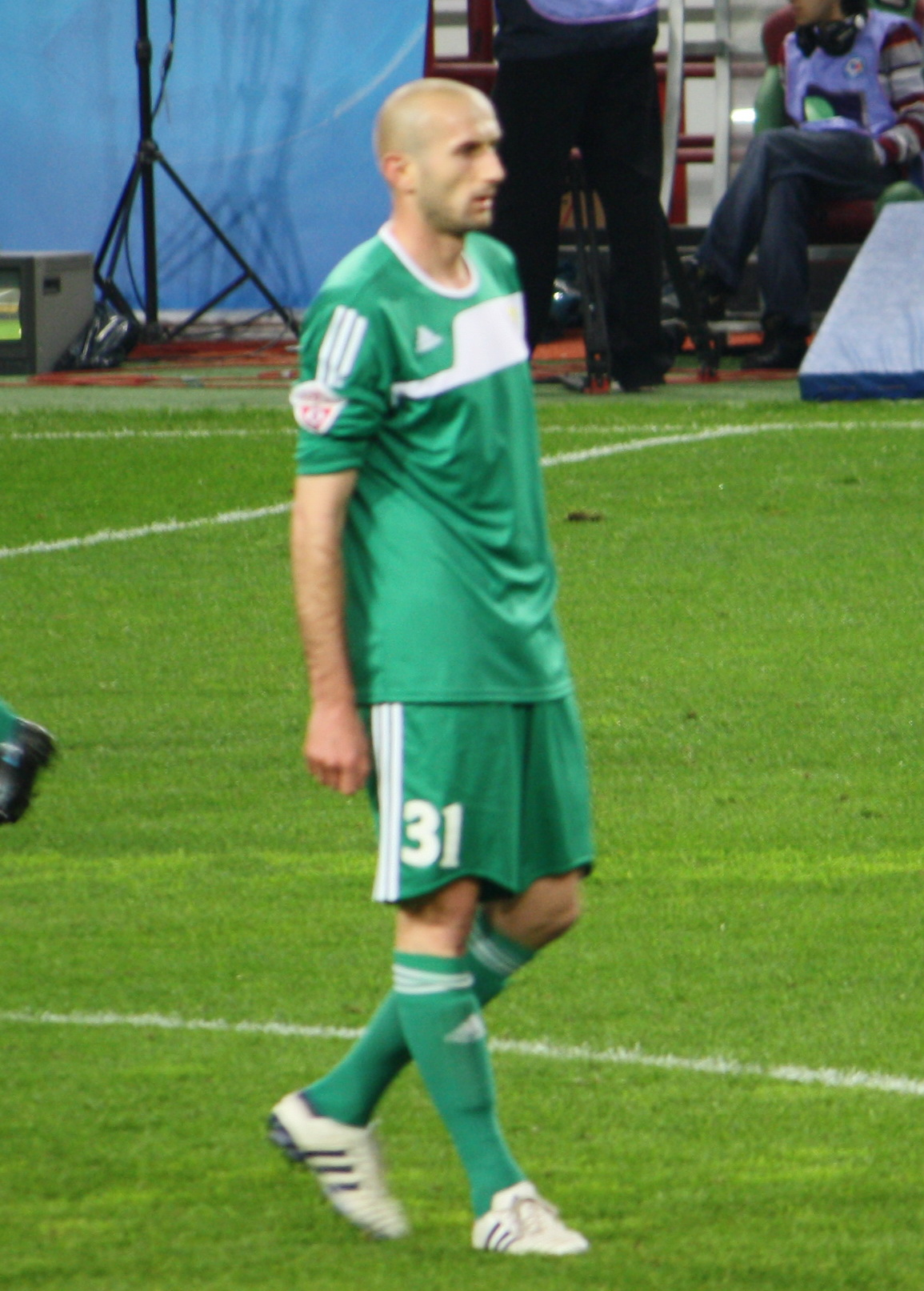
- Peković with Anzhi Makhachkala in 2010

Personal information
- Full name: Mitar Peković
- Date of birth: 28 September 1981 (age 45)
- Place of birth: Bačka Topola, SFR Yugoslavia
- Height: 1.90 m (6 ft 3 in)
- Position: Centre-back

Senior career*
Years	Team	Apps	(Gls)
1999–2000	AIK Bačka Topola	21	(1)
2000–2001	Kabel	13	(0)
2001–2004	Zeta	85	(4)
2005–2007	Wisła Płock	48	(2)
2007–2008	Čukarički	29	(0)
2009	Vojvodina	20	(0)
2010	Anzhi Makhachkala	19	(0)
2011–2013	Budućnost Podgorica	63	(1)
2013	Vendsyssel FF	1	(0)
2014	Sloboda Užice	0	(0)
2014	Vrbas	13	(1)
2015	Bežanija	14	(0)
2015–2016	Vrbas	17	(1)
Total		343	(10)

International career
2003	Serbia and Montenegro U21 (Note: Only official UEFA matches included)	5	(0)
- * Club domestic league appearances and goals

Mitar Peković (Serbian Cyrillic: Митар Пековић; born 28 September 1981) is a Serbian retired footballer who played as a defender.

== Club career ==
After making a name for himself at Zeta, Peković moved abroad and signed with Wisła Płock. He spent two and a half years in Poland, before returning to Serbia and joining newly promoted Serbian SuperLiga club Čukarički. He also played for Vojvodina, Anzhi Makhachkala, Budućnost Podgorica, Vendsyssel FF, Sloboda Užice, Bežanija, and Vrbas, before retiring from the game.

== International career ==
At international level, Peković was capped five times for Serbia and Montenegro at under-21 level.

== Honours ==
Wisła Płock

- Polish Cup: 2005–06
- Polish Super Cup: 2006

Budućnost Podgorica

- Montenegrin First League: 2011–12
- Montenegrin Cup: 2012–13
