= Dmitri Ivanov (footballer, born 1987) =

Russian footballer

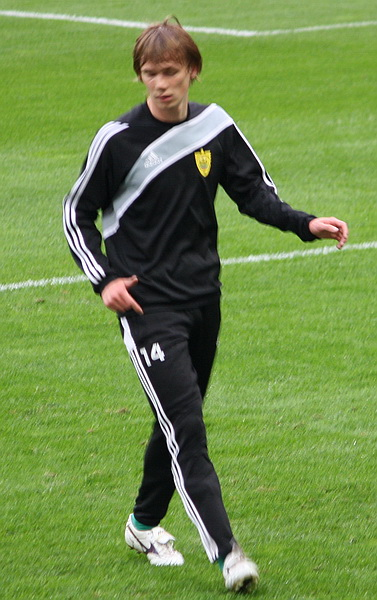

Personal information
- Full name: Dmitri Igorevich Ivanov
- Date of birth: 14 February 1987 (age 39)
- Place of birth: Leningrad, Russian SFSR, Soviet Union
- Height: 1.82 m (6 ft 0 in)
- Positions: Defender; midfielder

Team information
- Current team: Vereya
- Number: 14

Senior career*
Years	Team	Apps	(Gls)
2005–2007	Dynamo St. Petersburg	81	(8)
2008	Rostov	15	(1)
2008–2012	Anzhi Makhachkala	24	(0)
2011	→ Dagdizel Kaspiysk (loan)	8	(2)
2012–2013	Petrotrest St. Petersburg	1	(0)
2013–2016	Volgar Astrakhan	81	(5)
2016–2017	Fakel Voronezh	26	(1)
2017	Tyumen	9	(0)
2018	Volgar Astrakhan	13	(0)
2018	Khimki	3	(0)
2018	→ Khimki-M	9	(0)
2019	Vereya	5	(0)
- * Club domestic league appearances and goals

Dmitri Igorevich Ivanov (Russian: Дмитрий Игоревич Иванов; born 14 February 1987) is a Russian former professional footballer.

== Club career ==
He made his professional debut in the Russian First Division in 2005 for FC Petrotrest St. Petersburg.
