= Todor Timonov =

Bulgarian footballer (born 1986)

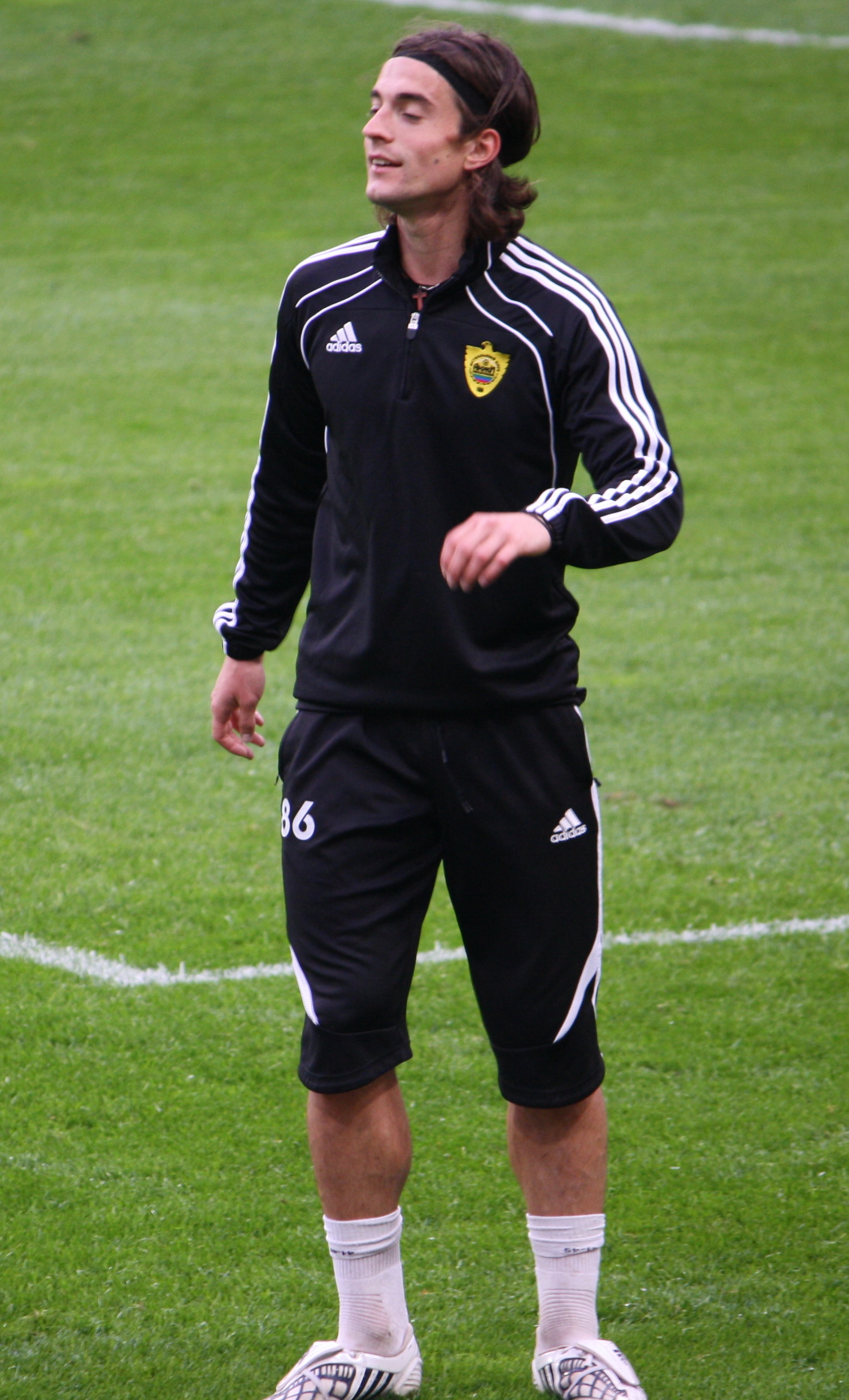
- Timonov training with Anzhi Makhachkala in 2010

Personal information
- Full name: Todor Ivanov Timonov
- Date of birth: 3 September 1986 (age 40)
- Place of birth: Plovdiv, Bulgaria
- Height: 1.84 m (6 ft 0 in)
- Position: Midfielder

Youth career
- Botev Plovdiv

Senior career*
Years	Team	Apps	(Gls)
2003–2009	Botev Plovdiv	74	(8)
2008	→ Nesebar (loan)	13	(3)
2009–2010	CSKA Sofia	10	(2)
2010	Anzhi Makhachkala	11	(0)
2011	Botev Plovdiv	15	(7)
2012	Bdin Vidin	6	(2)
2012–2013	Lokomotiv Plovdiv	12	(0)
2014	Anagennisi Karditsa	7	(1)
2015	Vereya	2	(0)
2015–2016	Asenovets	29	(5)
2016–2018	Eurocollege	58	(13)
2018–2021	Maritsa Plovdiv		
2021–2022	Spartak Plovdiv		

International career
2006	Bulgaria U21	1	(0)
- * Club domestic league appearances and goals

Todor Ivanov Timonov (Bulgarian: Тодор Тимонов; born 3 September 1986) is a Bulgarian former footballer who played as a midfielder.

== Career ==
Todor Timonov was raised in Botev Plovdiv's youth teams. In 2002, Timonov agreed the conditions of his first professional contract with the club which will be effective for five years. He made his official debut in top division of Bulgarian football as a 17-year-old in a match against Lokomotiv Sofia on 29 November 2003. Todor substituted Stoyan Seymenski in second half and played for 5 minutes. The result of the match was a 0:1 loss for Botev. For four years the young midfielder played in 48 matches for Botev (29 in first division and 15 in second division) and scored 4 goals (1 in first division and 3 in second division). In December 2007, he was loaned for six months in PFC Nesebar. In the summer of 2008, Timonov returned to his first club. A year later, he signed a 3-year contract as a free agent with CSKA Sofia.

On 6 February 2010, CSKA Sofia sold Timonov to Russian Anzhi Makhachkala for a reported transfer fee of $500,000. On 20 March 2010, he made his official debut for his new team in the 0:1 away loss against Amkar Perm in a Russian Premier League game after coming on as a substitute for Nicolae Josan in the 84th minute of the match.

On 6 November 2010, he was giving a half-time interview to a sideline reporter during a league game on live TV and said "If we score a penalty, everything will be fucking great." (Russian: "Должны забить пенальти и вообще охуительно всё будет.") Anzhi manager Gadzhi Gadzhiev said that Timonov probably didn't quite know that what he was saying was a swear word, but he will be fined by the club for the incident nevertheless.
