= Otar Khizaneishvili =

Georgian footballer

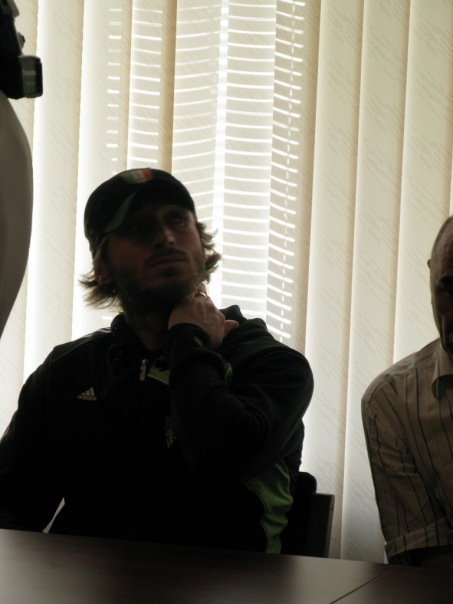
- Khizaneishvili in 2010

Personal information
- Date of birth: 26 September 1981 (age 45)
- Place of birth: Tbilisi, Georgian SSR, Soviet Union
- Height: 1.87 m (6 ft 2 in)
- Positions: Centre-back; right back

Senior career*
Years	Team	Apps	(Gls)
1988–2000	Dinamo Tbilisi	15	(0)
2000–2001	Spartak Moscow	4	(0)
2000	→ Spartak-2 Moscow	5	(0)
2001–2002	Rostselmash Rostov-on-Don	4	(0)
2002–2004	Dinamo Tbilisi	33	(0)
2004–2005	Dynamo Moscow	14	(0)
2005–2008	SC Freiburg	32	(1)
2008–2010	FC Augsburg	6	(0)
2010–2011	Anzhi Makhachkala	8	(0)
2011–2012	FC Vostok	11	(2)
2012–2013	Dinamo Tbilisi	30	(0)
2013–2014	Dila Gori	15	(1)
2014	FC Zestaponi	1	(0)
2014–2015	Sioni Bolnisi	4	(0)
2015	FC Zestaponi	6	(1)

International career
1997–1998	Georgia U-17	4	(0)
1998–2000	Georgia U-19	8	(0)
1999–2002	Georgia U-21	10	(0)
1999–2007	Georgia	20	(0)
- * Club domestic league appearances and goals

Otar Khizaneishvili (Georgian: ოთარ ხიზანეიშვილი, born 26 September 1981) is a Georgian former professional footballer who played as a centre-back for the Georgian national team.

== Early life ==
Khizaneishvili was born on 26 September 1981 in Tbilisi, the capital city of the Republic of Georgia to a Russian father from Moscow and a Georgian mother.

== Club career ==
Khizaneishvili came from the youth team of Dinamo Tbilisi, and debuted for the Georgia national team at the age of 18. He went to Russian giants Spartak Moscow, but failed to make a breakthrough and had various spells for other Russian clubs as well as Dinamo in the following seasons.

Fine performances for Georgia in the qualification for the 2006 FIFA World Cup attracted the interest of SC Freiburg, which is known for signing Georgian players. He scored his first goal for Freiburg in a 3–1 win against Rot-Weiss Essen on 28 January 2007.

In August 2015, Khizaneishvili announced his retirement from professional football.

== International career ==
Khizaneishvili earned 20 caps for the national team.
