= Gadzhi Gadzhiyev (footballer) =

Russian footballer

Personal information
- Full name: Gadzhi Gadzhiyevich Gadzhiyev
- Date of birth: 27 March 1991 (age 35)
- Height: 1.70 m (5 ft 7 in)
- Position: Midfielder

Youth career
- –2006: RSDYuShOR-2 Makhachkala
- 2006–2009: FC Lokomotiv Moscow

Senior career*
Years	Team	Apps	(Gls)
2009	FC FSA Voronezh	0	(0)
2010–2012	FC Anzhi Makhachkala	0	(0)
- * Club domestic league appearances and goals

Gadzhi Gadzhiyevich Gadzhiyev (Russian: Гаджи Гаджиевич Гаджиев; born 27 March 1991) is a former Russian footballer.

== Career ==
Gadzhiyev made his professional debut for Anzhi Makhachkala on 14 July 2010 in the Russian Cup game against FC Pskov-747.
