= Shamil Burziyev =

Russian footballer (1985–2010)

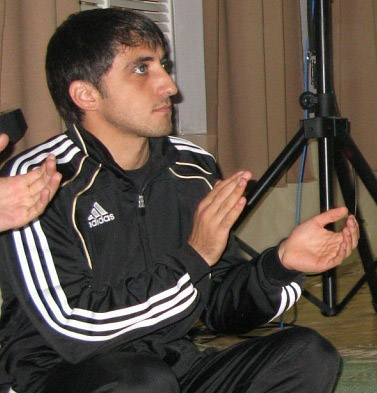

Personal information
- Full name: Shamil Gasanovich Burziyev
- Date of birth: 1 April 1985
- Place of birth: Buynaksk, USSR
- Date of death: 5 December 2010 (aged 25)
- Place of death: Kizilyurtovsky District, Russia
- Height: 1.75 m (5 ft 9 in)
- Positions: Midfielder; defender

Youth career
- RSDYuShOR-2 Makhachkala

Senior career*
Years	Team	Apps	(Gls)
2001–2004	FC Anzhi Makhachkala	10	(0)
2005–2006	FC Dynamo Makhachkala	42	(1)
2007	FC Chernomorets Novorossiysk	25	(1)
2008	FC Dynamo Stavropol	27	(1)
2009	FC Chernomorets Novorossiysk	31	(0)
2010	FC Fakel Voronezh	7	(0)
2010	FC Anzhi Makhachkala	6	(0)
Total		148	(3)
- * Club domestic league appearances and goals

Shamil Gasanovich Burziyev (Russian: Шамиль Гасанович Бурзиев; 1 April 1985 – 5 December 2010) was a Russian professional footballer.

== Club career ==
Dagestan-born Burziyev played the majority of his career in the lower leagues of Russian football. With Anzhi he also featured in the Russian Premier League and helped them to avoid relegation after reaching the 12th spot in the league in 2010.

Burziyev died in a car accident. The 25-year-old had been returning to Makhachkala when he lost control of his car, sending it off the road. The incident occurred on the Rostov to Baku main road. Burziyev and his friend were killed on the impact of the crash, while another person was in a critical condition in hospital.
