= Akhmad Magomedov =

Russian footballer

Personal information
- Full name: Akhmad Gasbullayevich Magomedov
- Date of birth: 10 August 1989 (age 37)
- Height: 1.85 m (6 ft 1 in)
- Position: Defender

Senior career*
Years	Team	Apps	(Gls)
2010	FC Anzhi Makhachkala	0	(0)
2011	FC Dagdizel Kaspiysk	10	(0)
2013–2014	FC Slavyane Salsk		
2015	FC Chayka Peschanokopskoye (amateur)		
2017	FC Legion-Dynamo Makhachkala	14	(2)
- * Club domestic league appearances and goals

Akhmad Gasbullayevich Magomedov (Russian: Ахмад Гасбуллаевич Магомедов; born 10 August 1989) is a Russian former footballer.

== Career ==
Magomedov made his professional debut for Anzhi Makhachkala on 14 July 2010 in the Russian Cup game against FC Pskov-747.
