= Revaz Barabadze =

Georgian footballer (born 1988)

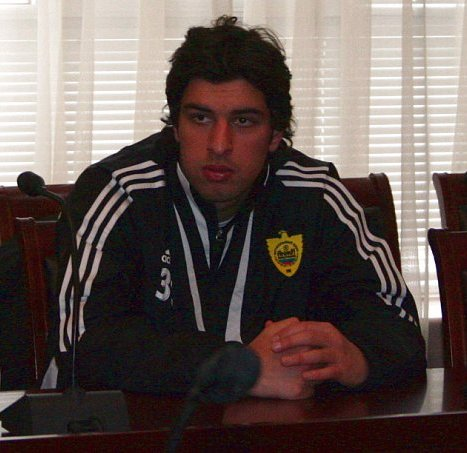
- Barabadze in 2010

Personal information
- Date of birth: 4 October 1988 (age 38)
- Place of birth: Tbilisi, USSR
- Height: 1.90 m (6 ft 3 in)
- Position: Forward

Senior career*
Years	Team	Apps	(Gls)
2003–2004	Dinamo-3 Tbilisi	42	(27)
2004–2006	FC Tbilisi	34	(8)
2006–2007	Dnipro Dnipropetrovsk	3	(0)
2007	Carl Zeiss Jena	0	(0)
2008–2010	Anzhi Makhachkala	10	(1)
2010–2011	Olimpi Rustavi	2	(0)
2012–2013	Dila Gori	9	(1)
2013	Locomotive Tbilisi	4	(0)
2013–2014	Torpedo Kutaisi	5	(1)
2015	Metalurgi Rustavi	13	(2)
2015	Liakhvi Tskhinvali	16	(19)
2016	Ethnikos Achna	12	(0)
2016	Liakhvi Tskhinvali	7	(5)
2017	Merani Martvili	29	(19)
2018	FC Rustavi	2	(0)

International career
2007–2010	Georgia U21	7	(4)
2008–2010	Georgia	2	(0)
- * Club domestic league appearances and goals

Revazi Barabadze (Georgian: რევაზ ბარაბაძე; born 4 October 1988) is a Georgian former professional footballer who played as a forward.
