= Gocha Khojava =

Georgian footballer

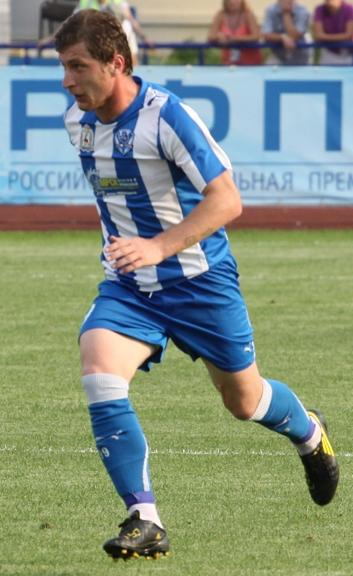
- Khojava in 2011

Personal information
- Date of birth: 16 March 1985 (age 41)
- Place of birth: Tbilisi, Georgia SSR, Soviet Union
- Height: 1.79 m (5 ft 10 in)
- Position: Midfielder

Senior career*
Years	Team	Apps	(Gls)
2002–2003	FC Merani Tbilisi	8	(2)
2003–2004	FC Tbilisi	15	(2)
2004–2005	Anorthosis Famagusta	4	(1)
2005	FC Merani Tbilisi	9	(1)
2005	FC Rostov	1	(0)
2006–2007	FC Olimpi Rustavi	7	(1)
2007–2010	FC Anzhi Makhachkala	91	(5)
2010	→ FC Volga Nizhny Novgorod (loan)	12	(2)
2011	FC Volga Nizhny Novgorod	11	(3)
2012–2013	FC Dila Gori	14	(2)
2013	FC SKA-Energiya Khabarovsk	10	(1)
2013–2014	FC Alania Vladikavkaz	6	(0)
2014	FC Dila Gori	2	(0)
2014	AEK Larnaca FC	0	(0)
2014–2015	FC Sakhalin Yuzhno-Sakhalinsk	18	(0)
2015	FC Shukura Kobuleti		
2015	FC SKA-Energiya Khabarovsk	12	(1)
2017	FC Rustavi	0	(0)

International career
2001–2002	Georgia U17	5	(0)
2003–2004	Georgia U19	1	(0)
2005–2006	Georgia U21	8	(1)
2010	Georgia	2	(0)
- * Club domestic league appearances and goals

Gocha Khojava (Georgian: გოჩა ხოჯავა; born 16 March 1985) is a Georgian former footballer. He also holds Russian citizenship as Gocha Dzhemalovich Khodzhava (Russian: Гоча Джемалович Ходжава).
