= Ibra Kébé =

Senegalese footballer

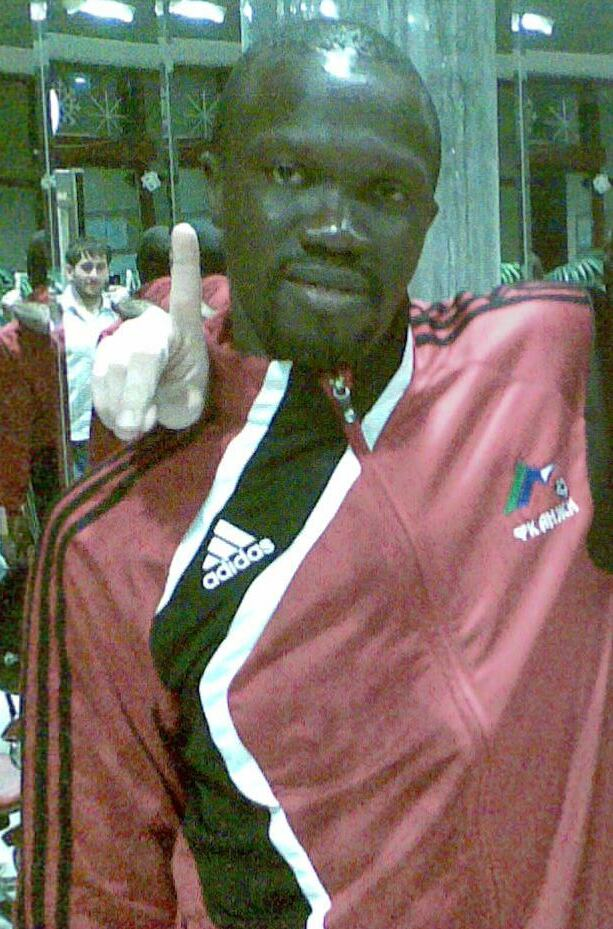

Personal information
- Full name: Ali Ibrahim Kébé Baye
- Date of birth: 24 December 1978 (age 47)
- Place of birth: Saint-Louis, Senegal
- Height: 1.79 m (5 ft 10 in)
- Position: Defensive midfielder

Senior career*
Years	Team	Apps	(Gls)
1998	Dakar UC		
1999–2001	ASC Jeanne d'Arc		
2001–2004	Spartak Moscow	47	(3)
2005	Alania Vladikavkaz	0	(0)
2006	Spartak Nizhny Novgorod	18	(1)
2006–2011	Anzhi Makhachkala	81	(6)

International career
2000–2003	Senegal	6	(0)
- * Club domestic league appearances and goals

Ali Ibrahim Kébé Baye (born 24 December 1978), commonly known as Ibra Kébé, is a Senegalese former professional footballer who played as a defensive midfielder.

== Career ==
In 2002, Kébé signed for Spartak Moscow and made his Champions League debut in the away defeat to FC Basel.

Despite a relatively bright start to his Spartak career, soon Kébé fell out of favour at the Russian club. The Senegalese defender left Spartak after two seasons with the club. He then played for Spartak Nizhny Novgorod and, after their relegation from the Russian First Division, for FC Dila Gori. In January 2009, Kébé was expected to sign for the newly promoted Premier League side FC Rostov, but the deal fell through because of a serious knee injury.

His younger brother Pape Maguette Kebe played for FC Rubin Kazan.
