= Zurab Arziani =

Georgian footballer

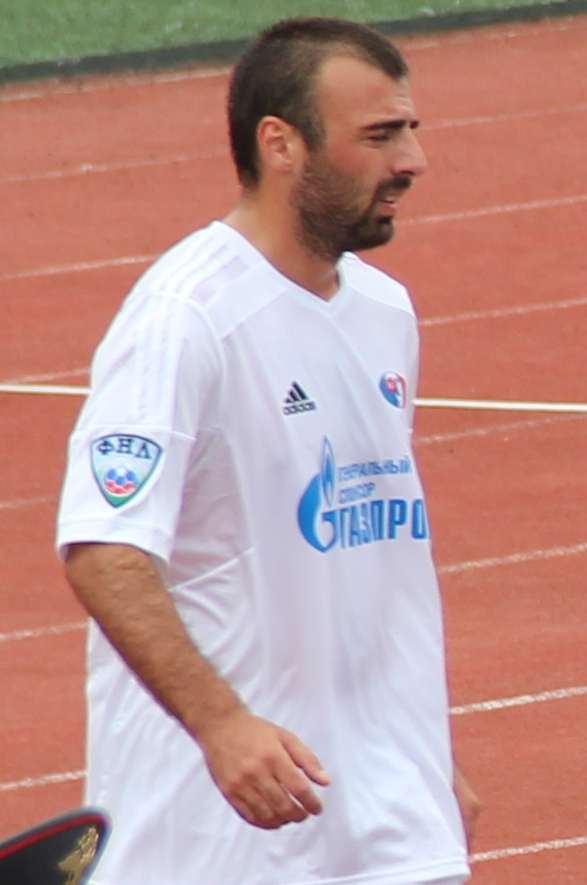

Personal information
- Full name: Zurab Malkhazovich Arziani
- Date of birth: 19 October 1987 (age 39)
- Place of birth: Batumi, Georgian SSR
- Height: 1.78 m (5 ft 10 in)
- Position: Midfielder

Senior career*
Years	Team	Apps	(Gls)
2004	Saturn Ramenskoye	0	(0)
2005–2006	Rubin Kazan	0	(0)
2007	Olimpi Rustavi	1	(0)
2007–2011	Anzhi Makhachkala	90	(1)
2011	→ Dinamo Tbilisi (loan)	14	(2)
2011–2012	Volga Nizhny Novgorod	5	(0)
2012–2013	Dila Gori	28	(2)
2013–2014	Gazovik Orenburg	15	(0)
2014–2015	Sakhalin Yuzhno-Sakhalinsk	18	(1)
2015	Nyíregyháza Spartacus	9	(0)
2015–2016	Torpedo Armavir	22	(0)
2016–2017	Shukura Kobuleti	9	(0)
2017	Saburtalo Tbilisi	17	(0)
2017	Dinamo Batumi	9	(0)
2018	Kolkheti Poti	15	(0)
2018	Merani Tbilisi	8	(1)
2019–2020	Ararat Yerevan	12	(0)
2020	Shevardeni-1906 Tbilisi	4	(0)
2021	FC Tbilisi City		
- * Club domestic league appearances and goals

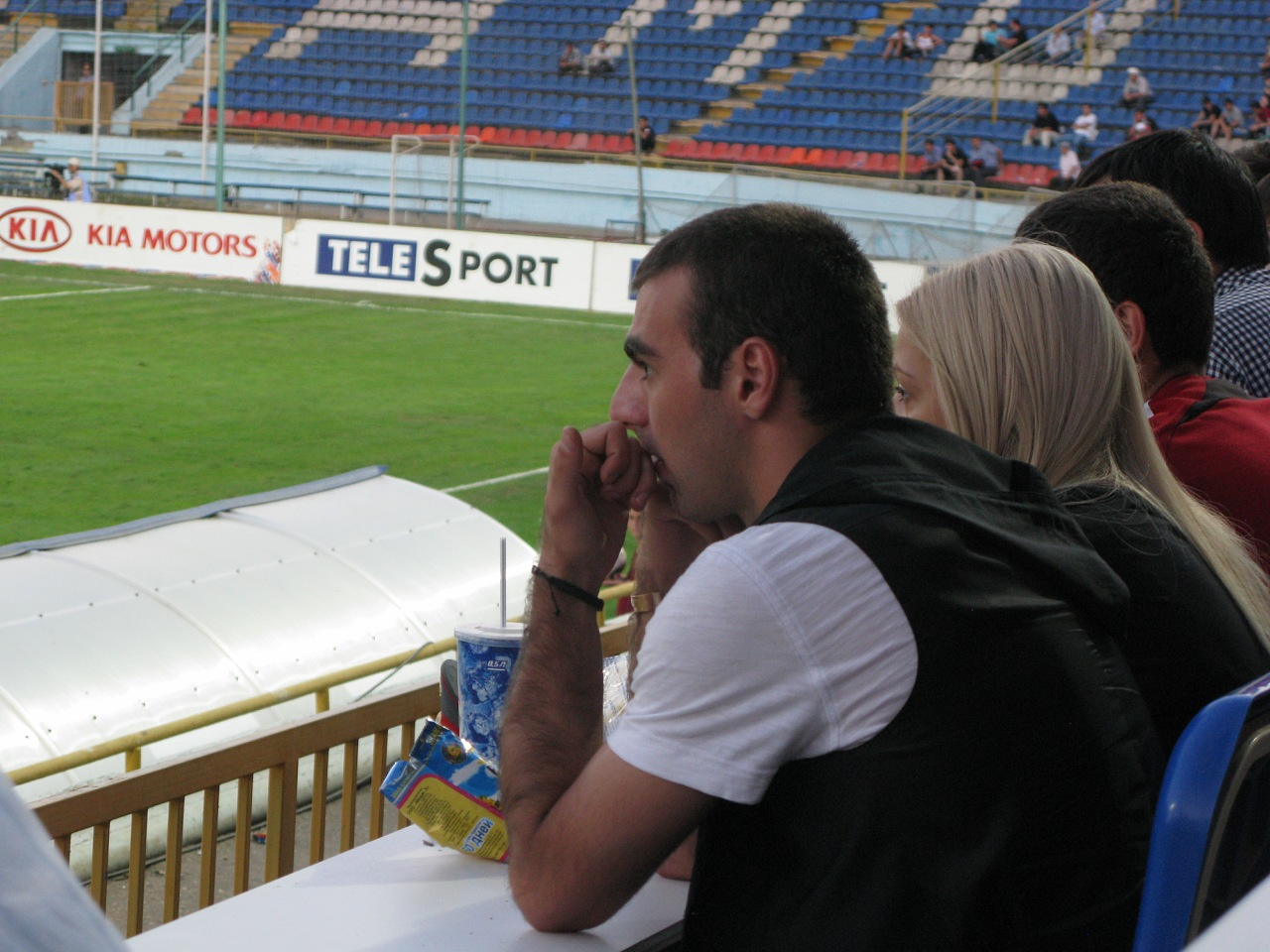
Zurab Arziani in 2010

Zurab Malkhazovich Arziani (born 19 October 1987) is a Georgian former footballer. He also holds Russian citizenship.

== Career ==
On 21 January 2015, Arziani and FC Sakhalin Yuzhno-Sakhalinsk cancelled their contract by mutual consent.

== Personal life ==
He is the son of Malkhaz Arziani.

== Career statistics ==
As of match played 22 November 2014

Club	Season	League			National Cup		Continental		Other		Total	
Club	Season	Division	Apps	Goals	Apps	Goals	Apps	Goals	Apps	Goals	Apps	Goals
Olimpi Rustavi	2006–07	Georgian Premier League	1	0			–		–		1	0
Anzhi Makhachkala	2007	Russian Football League	29	0	0	0	–		–		29	0
Anzhi Makhachkala	2008	Russian Football League	32	1	1	0	–		–		34	1
Anzhi Makhachkala	2009	Russian Football League	18	0	0	0	–		–		18	0
Anzhi Makhachkala	2010	Russian Premier League	11	0	0	0	–		–		11	0
Anzhi Makhachkala	Total		90	1	1	0	0	0	0	0	91	1
Dinamo Tbilisi (loan)	2010–11	Georgian Premier League	14	2	0	0	–		–		14	2
Volga Nizhny Novgorod	2011–12	Russian Premier League	5	0	0	0	–		–		5	0
Dila Gori	2011–12	Georgian Premier League	11	1	1	0	–		–		12	1
Dila Gori	2012–13	Georgian Premier League	17	1	1	0	1	0	1	0	20	1
Dila Gori	Total		28	2	2	0	1	0	1	0	32	2
Gazovik Orenburg	2013–14	Russian Football League	15	0	0	0	–		–		15	0
Sakhalin Yuzhno-Sakhalinsk	2014–15	Russian Football League	18	1	0	0	–		–		18	1
Career total			171	6	3	0	1	0	1	0	176	6

== Honors ==
Anzhi Makhachkala

- Russian First Division (1): 2009

Dila Gori

- Georgian Cup (1): 2011–12
