= Leonid Musin =

Ukrainian-Russian footballer

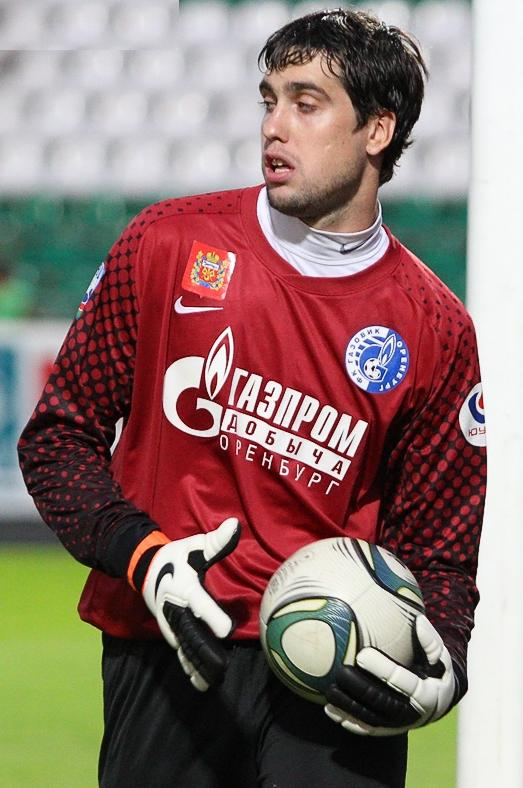
- Musin with Gazovik Orenburg in 2011

Personal information
- Full name: Leonid Oleksandrovych Musin
- Date of birth: 19 April 1985 (age 41)
- Place of birth: Moscow, Russian SFSR
- Height: 1.99 m (6 ft 6 in)
- Position: Goalkeeper

Youth career
- 1998–2001: Spartak Moscow
- 2001–2002: Dynamo Kyiv

Senior career*
Years	Team	Apps	(Gls)
2001–2007	Dynamo Kyiv	0	(0)
2002	→ Borysfen-2 Boryspil (loan)	4	(0)
2002–2005	→ Dynamo-3 Kyiv	21	(0)
2003–2007	→ Dynamo-2 Kyiv	27	(0)
2007	Poltava	5	(0)
2008	Dinamo Minsk	1	(0)
2008	Oleksandria	7	(0)
2010	Anzhi Makhachkala	0	(0)
2011	Ural Sverdlovsk Oblast	3	(0)
2011–2012	Gazovik Orenburg	27	(0)
2012–2013	Tyumen	16	(0)
2014	Tyumen	2	(0)
2014	Dolgoprudny	0	(0)
2015	Górnik Wałbrzych	9	(0)
2015–2017	Solyaris Moscow	48	(0)
2017	Inter Alfa Moscow	3	(0)
2018–2019	Peresvet Domodedovo	14	(0)

International career
2002	Ukraine U17	3	(0)
2005	Ukraine U20	5	(0)
2005	Ukraine U21	1	(0)
- * Club domestic league appearances and goals

Leonid Oleksandrovych Musin (Ukrainian: Леонід Олександрович Мусін; born 19 April 1985) is a Ukrainian former professional footballer who played as a goalkeeper. He also holds Russian citizenship.

He represented Ukraine at the 2002 UEFA European Under-17 Football Championship.

== See also ==
- 2005 FIFA World Youth Championship squads § Ukraine
