= Nicolae Josan =

Moldovan footballer

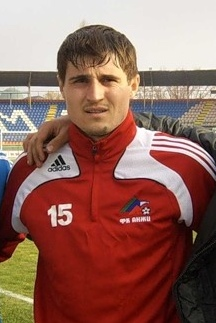

Personal information
- Date of birth: 18 September 1983 (age 43)
- Place of birth: Rezina, Moldova
- Height: 1.75 m (5 ft 9 in)
- Position: Midfielder

Senior career*
Years	Team	Apps	(Gls)
2001–2003	Sheriff Tiraspol	3	(0)
2003–2004	Tiraspol	28	(2)
2004–2005	Sheriff Tiraspol	22	(0)
2005	Iskra-Stal Rîbniţa	0	(0)
2006	KAMAZ Naberezhnye Chelny	14	(0)
2006–2007	Iskra-Stal Rîbniţa	26	(6)
2008–2010	Anzhi Makhachkala	87	(23)
2012	Dacia Chisinau	25	(2)
2013–2014	Tiraspol	19	(1)
2014	Veris Chișinău	24	(1)
2015	Sakhalin Yuzhno-Sakhalinsk	12	(0)
2015	Zaria Bălți	6	(1)

International career
2004–2013	Moldova	17	(2)
- * Club domestic league appearances and goals

Nicolae Josan (born 18 September 1983) is a Moldovan former footballer.

== Career ==
In March 2015, Josan signed for FC Sakhalin Yuzhno-Sakhalinsk.

== Honours ==
- Russian First Division best midfielder: 2009.

== International goals ==
#	Date	Venue	Opponent	Score	Result	Competition
1	17 November 2007	Zimbru Stadium, Chişinău	Hungary	3–0	Win	UEFA Euro 2008 qualifying
2	12 October 2010	San Marino Stadium, Serravalle	San Marino	2–0	Win	UEFA Euro 2012 qualifying
