= Andrei Streltsov =

Russian footballer

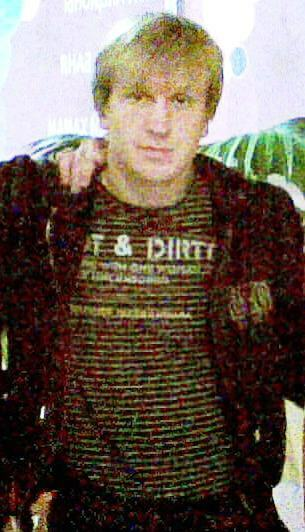

Personal information
- Full name: Andrei Ivanovich Streltsov
- Date of birth: 18 March 1984 (age 42)
- Place of birth: Uvarovo, Russian SFSR
- Height: 1.85 m (6 ft 1 in)
- Positions: Full back; winger

Youth career
- ?–2001: Akademika Moscow

Senior career*
Years	Team	Apps	(Gls)
2001–2003	FC Spartak Moscow	5	(0)
2003–2004	FC Rubin Kazan	1	(0)
2004	→ FC Neftekhimik Nizhnekamsk (loan)	19	(2)
2005	Dinaburg FC	5	(0)
2006–2008	FC Anzhi Makhachkala	86	(8)
2008	FC Luch-Energiya Vladivostok	15	(0)
2009	FC Khimki	10	(1)
2010	FC Anzhi Makhachkala	18	(3)
2011	FC Dynamo Bryansk	5	(0)
2012	Daugava Daugavpils	7	(1)
- * Club domestic league appearances and goals

Andrei Ivanovich Streltsov (Russian: Андрей Иванович Стрельцов; born 18 March 1984) is a former Russian footballer.

He played on either flank of defence or midfield, and sometimes used even as a striker.

== Career ==
On 1 February 2010 FC Anzhi Makhachkala signed the Russian right-back from FC Khimki, already he played for Anzhi from 2006 to 2008.
