= Giorgi Iluridze =

Georgian footballer

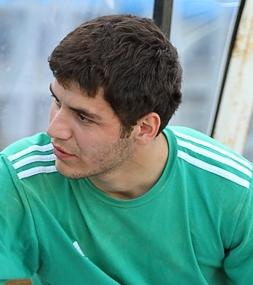

Personal information
- Date of birth: 20 February 1992 (age 34)
- Place of birth: Tbilisi, Georgia
- Height: 1.80 m (5 ft 11 in)
- Position: Forward

Team information
- Current team: Telavi
- Number: 21

Youth career
- 2001–2010: Dinamo Tbilisi
- 2010–2011: Anzhi Makhachkala

Senior career*
Years	Team	Apps	(Gls)
2010–2011	Anzhi Makhachkala	5	(0)
2012–2013	Dila Gori	18	(2)
2013–2014	Hajduk Split	13	(1)
2014	Ermis Aradippou	0	(0)
2014–2015	Zestaponi	18	(6)
2015–2016	Dila Gori	9	(1)
2016	SKA-Energiya Khabarovsk	9	(0)
2016–2018	Ethnikos Achna	31	(0)
2018–2019	Dinamo Batumi	31	(6)
2020–2023	Samtredia	48	(5)
2023–	Telavi	2	(0)

International career
2008–2009	Georgia U19	3	(5)
2009–2011	Georgia U21	2	(2)
- * Club domestic league appearances and goals as of 4 March 2023

Giorgi Iluridze (Georgian: გიორგი ილურიძე; born 20 February 1992) is a Georgian footballer who plays for Telavi.

== Career ==
A product of his hometown's FC Dinamo Tbilisi and a youth international, Iluridze was scouted and signed by FC Anzhi Makhachkala in 2010, where he made his first team debut in the Russian Premier League on 6 May 2010, aged 18, in a 3–0 away loss against FC Spartak Moscow, coming in the 75th minute for Mikhail Bakayev. He gathered 4 further caps for his team before a row of injuries impeded his career. After his recovery, he couldn't get any further chances with the first team, playing with Anzhi's youth squad until the end of 2011.

In early 2012, he signed with FC Dila Gori back in his native Georgia, where he would spend the next year and a half.

He then moved to Croatia's HNK Hajduk Split in late August 2013, having been noted by his new team after he had scored the sole goal in Dila's 1–0 away win in the UEFA Europa League against them. He made his Hajduk debut on 14 September in a 2–0 home win against Dinamo Zagreb. He made 15 appearances, scoring one goal and assisting two others in his sole season at Hajduk. He was released from his contract in April, 2014.

== International career ==
A former youth international, Iluridze was called up for Georgia's 2014 FIFA World Cup qualification Group I matches in September 2013 against France and Finland but he didn't join the team due to injury.
