= Dmitri Vasilyev (footballer, born 1985) =

Russian footballer

Dmitry Vasilyev
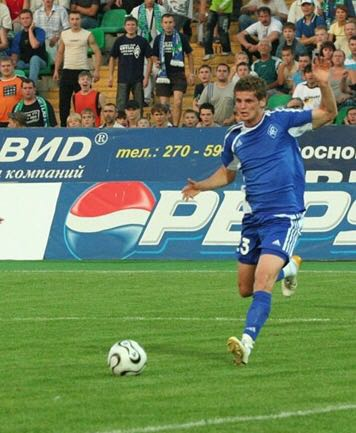

Personal information
- Full name: Dmitry Vyacheslavovich Vasilyev
- Date of birth: 2 May 1985 (age 41)
- Place of birth: Sochi, Russian SFSR
- Height: 1.89 m (6 ft 2 in)
- Position: Forward

Youth career
- 2000–2002: Hajduk Split

Senior career*
| Years | Team | Apps | (Gls) |
| 2003 | Arsenal-2 Kyiv | 8 | (3) |
| 2004 | Sochi-04 (amateur) | | |
| 2004–2005 | Shinnik Yaroslavl | 8 | (0) |
| 2006–2008 | Krylia Sovetov Samara | 12 | (0) |
| 2010 | Anzhi Makhachkala | 0 | (0) |
| 2012 | Luch-Energiya Vladivostok | 6 | (0) |
| 2013–2014 | Sochi (amateur) | | |
| 2015 | Vityaz Krymsk | 9 | (5) |

International career
| 2002 | Russia U17 | 7 | (5) |
| 2005 | Russia U21 | 1 | (0) |
- * Club domestic league appearances and goals

Dmitry Vyacheslavovich Vasilyev (Russian: Дмитрий Вячеславович Васильев; born 2 May 1985) is a former Russian professional footballer.

== Club career ==
Studied in Hajduk Split 2001–2003. Was selected in junior and youth combined teams, Shinnik, Krilya Sovetov, FC League, FC Sochi. He made his professional debut in the Russian Premier League in 2005 for FC Shinnik Yaroslavl. He played 3 games in the UEFA Intertoto Cup 2004 for FC Shinnik Yaroslavl.

He should not be confused with Dmitry Vladimirovich Vasilyev, a former Russian international who also played for FC Shinnik Yaroslavl.

== Personal life ==
His grandfather Vasili Vasilyev played in the Soviet Top League in the 1950s for PFC Krylia Sovetov Samara and Admiralteets Leningrad and later was a manager for many clubs. His father Vyacheslav Vasilyev played in the Soviet Second League for FC Fakel Voronezh and FC Volgar Astrakhan.
