= FC Dagdizel Kaspiysk =

- Full name: Football Club Dagdizel Kaspiysk
- Founded: 1949
- Dissolved: 2014
- Ground: Trud
- League: Russian Professional Football League; Zone South
- 2013–14: 5th

FC Dagdizel Kaspiysk (Russian: Футбольный клуб "Дагдизель" Каспийск) was a Russian football club from Kaspiysk, founded in 1949. It played in the Russian Second Division, zone South, since 2008 (also played there in 2006). It was previously known as Sudostroitel Kaspiysk (1949–1967), Trud Kaspiysk (1968–1986), Torpedo Kaspiysk (1987–1989), Kaspiy Kaspiysk (1990–1993) and Argo Kaspiysk (1994). It played in Soviet Second Group in 1949, in the Soviet Class B in 1968 and 1969, and in Soviet Second League B in 1991. It played in Russian amateur championship (zone South) in 2003–2005 and 2007. Before the 2014–15 season, the team was dissolved and replaced in the PFL by FC Anzhi-2 Makhachkala.
