= 2007–08 Blackburn Rovers F.C. season =

Blackburn Rovers
2007–08 season
- Manager: Mark Hughes
- Premier League: 7th
- FA Cup: Third round
- League Cup: Fifth round
- UEFA Intertoto Cup: Third round
- UEFA Cup: First round
- Top goalscorer: League: Roque Santa Cruz (19); All: Roque Santa Cruz (23)
- Highest home attendance: 30,316 (vs. Manchester United, 19 April)
- Lowest home attendance: 19,316 (vs. Birmingham City, 7 October)
- Average home league attendance: 23,916

Blackburn Rovers F.C. finished in the top half of the Premier League for the third successive season, this time ending up in 7th place, ultimately not enough for European qualification. Manager Mark Hughes departed for Manchester City at the end of the season, while successful winger David Bentley was sold to Tottenham Hotspur for a club record fee. Striker Roque Santa Cruz, a summer signing from Bayern Munich, had the season of his life, scoring 19 league goals, making up for Benni McCarthy's loss of form. Despite interest for richer clubs, Santa Cruz stayed on for another season.

== Final league table ==
Pos	Team	Pld	W	D	L	GF	GA	GD	Pts	Qualification or relegation
5	Everton	38	19	8	11	55	33	+22	65	Qualification for the UEFA Cup first round
6	Aston Villa	38	16	12	10	71	51	+20	60	Qualification for the Intertoto Cup third round
7	Blackburn Rovers	38	15	13	10	50	48	+2	58	
8	Portsmouth	38	16	9	13	48	40	+8	57	Qualification for the UEFA Cup first round (Note: As FA Cup winners)
9	Manchester City	38	15	10	13	45	53	−8	55	Qualification for the UEFA Cup first qualifying round (Note: Manchester City qualified as the highest-ranked team not already qualified for European competitions of Premier League Fair Play Ranking by The Football Association, the top association among UEFA Fair Play ranking winners.)

Source: Barclays Premier League
Rules for classification: 1) points; 2) goal difference; 3) number of goals scored.
For further information on European qualification see Premier League – Competition

== First-team squad ==
Squad at end of season

Note: Flags indicate national team as defined under FIFA eligibility rules; some limited exceptions apply. Players may hold more than one non-FIFA nationality.

No.	Pos.	Nation	Player
1	GK	USA	Brad Friedel
2	DF	NED	André Ooijer
3	DF	ENG	Stephen Warnock
4	DF	CGO	Christopher Samba (Note: Samba was born in Créteil, France, but also qualified to represent the Republic of the Congo internationally and made his international debut for the Congo in 2004.)
5	MF	TUR	Tugay Kerimoğlu
6	DF	NZL	Ryan Nelsen (captain)
7	MF	AUS	Brett Emerton
8	MF	SUI	Johann Vogel
9	FW	PAR	Roque Santa Cruz
10	FW	RSA	Benni McCarthy
11	FW	ENG	David Bentley

No.	Pos.	Nation	Player
12	MF	NOR	Morten Gamst Pedersen
13	DF	GEO	Zurab Khizanishvili
14	MF	IRL	Steven Reid (Note: Reid was born in Kingston upon Thames, England, but also qualified to represent the Republic of Ireland internationally through his father, and made his international debut for the Republic of Ireland in 2001.)
15	MF	RSA	Aaron Mokoena
17	FW	NED	Maceo Rigters
19	MF	ENG	David Dunn
20	DF	SUI	Bruno Berner
22	MF	IRL	Keith Treacy
27	FW	ENG	Matt Derbyshire
29	DF	SWE	Martin Olsson
30	FW	GRN	Jason Roberts (Note: Roberts was born in Park Royal, London, England, but also qualified to represent Grenada internationally through his father, and made his international debut for Grenada in 1999.)

=== Left club during season ===
Note: Flags indicate national team as defined under FIFA eligibility rules; some limited exceptions apply. Players may hold more than one non-FIFA nationality.

No. / Pos. / Nation / Player; 8 / MF / WAL / Robbie Savage (to Derby County)	No. / Pos. / Nation / Player; 25 / DF / ENG / Andy Taylor (to Tranmere Rovers)

== Reserve squad ==
Note: Flags indicate national team as defined under FIFA eligibility rules; some limited exceptions apply. Players may hold more than one non-FIFA nationality.

No.	Pos.	Nation	Player
16	DF	SUI	Stéphane Henchoz
18	FW	SCO	Paul Gallagher
21	MF	GER	Sergio Peter
26	DF	IRL	Eddie Nolan
28	DF	NIR	Tony Kane (Note: Kane was born in Belfast, Northern Ireland, and has represented Northern Ireland at youth level, but later chose to represent the Republic of Ireland internationally at level. He would however later switch allegiances back and was called up to the Northern Ireland squad in November 2007.)
31	GK	FIN	Peter Enckelman
32	GK	WAL	Jason Brown (Note: Brown was born in Southwark, London, England, but also qualified to represent Wales internationally, and made his full international debut for Wales in May 2006.)
33	GK	ENG	Frank Fielding

No.	Pos.	Nation	Player
34	GK	FRO	Gunnar Nielsen
35	DF	ENG	Dean Winnard
36	MF	ENG	Josh O'Keefe (Note: O'Keefe was born in Whalley, England, but also qualified to represent the Republic of Ireland internationally, and would represent them at level.)
37	MF	AUS	Rostyn Griffiths (Note: Griffiths was born in Stoke-on-Trent, England, but also qualified to represent Australia internationally, and has represented them at youth level.)
38	FW	ENG	Jamie Clarke
44	FW	ITA	Raffaele De Vita
45	MF	SCO	Bryan Hodge

== Statistics ==
=== Appearances and goals ===
No.	Pos	Nat	Player	Total		Premier League		FA Cup		League Cup		UEFA Intertoto Cup		UEFA Cup	
No.	Pos	Nat	Player	Apps	Goals	Apps	Goals	Apps	Goals	Apps	Goals	Apps	Goals	Apps	Goals
Goalkeepers
1	GK	(United States) USA	Brad Friedel	48	0	38	0	1	0	3	0	2	0	4	0
Defenders
2	DF	(Netherlands) NED	André Ooijer	34	0	23+4	0	0	0	1	0	2	0	4	0
3	DF	(England) ENG	Stephen Warnock	45	2	37	1	0	0	1+1	0	2	0	4	1
4	DF	(Republic of the Congo) CGO	Christopher Samba	41	3	33	2	1	0	3	0	2	1	2	0
6	DF	(New Zealand) NZL	Ryan Nelsen	30	0	22	0	0+1	0	2	0	2	0	3	0
7	DF	(Australia) AUS	Brett Emerton	40	1	31+2	1	1	0	1+1	0	0	0	3+1	0
13	DF	(Georgia (country)) GEO	Zurab Khizanishvili	17	0	10+3	0	1	0	1+1	0	0	0	0+1	0
20	DF	(Switzerland) SUI	Bruno Berner	4	0	2	0	1	0	1	0	0	0	0	0
29	DF	(Sweden) SWE	Martin Olsson	4	0	0+2	0	0	0	1	0	0	0	0+1	0
Midfielders
5	MF	(Turkey) TUR	Tugay Kerimoğlu	27	2	12+8	2	1	0	1	0	1	0	2+2	0
8	MF	(Switzerland) SUI	Johann Vogel	6	0	6	0	0	0	0	0	0	0	0	0
11	MF	(England) ENG	David Bentley	47	9	37	6	1	1	3	1	2	0	4	1
12	MF	(Norway) NOR	Morten Gamst Pedersen	46	6	32+5	4	0+1	0	2	1	2	1	3+1	0
14	MF	(Republic of Ireland) IRL	Steven Reid	25	0	20+4	0	0	0	1	0	0	0	0	0
15	MF	(South Africa) RSA	Aaron Mokoena	26	0	8+10	0	1	0	2+1	0	1+1	0	2	0
19	MF	(England) ENG	David Dunn	38	1	25+6	1	0	0	3	0	0+1	0	3	0
22	MF	(Republic of Ireland) IRL	Keith Treacy	2	0	0	0	1	0	0+1	0	0	0	0	0
Forwards
9	FW	(Paraguay) PAR	Roque Santa Cruz	43	23	36+1	19	0	0	2+1	3	0	0	3	1
10	FW	(South Africa) RSA	Benni McCarthy	38	11	21+10	8	1	0	1+1	1	2	2	1+1	0
17	FW	(Netherlands) NED	Maceo Rigters	7	0	0+2	0	1	0	0+1	0	0+2	0	1	0
27	FW	(England) ENG	Matt Derbyshire	33	6	4+19	3	0+1	0	2+1	1	0+2	1	1+3	1
30	FW	(Grenada) GRN	Jason Roberts	31	5	11+15	3	0	0	1	0	2	1	2	1
Players transferred out during the season
8	MF	(Wales) WAL	Robbie Savage	18	0	10+2	0	0	0	1	0	2	0	2+1	0

Last updated: 31 June 2008
Source: Competitions

== Results ==
=== Pre-season ===
10 July 2007	Wrexham	2–1	Blackburn Rovers	Racecourse Ground, Wrexham
	Goal		Goal

15 July 2007	Arminia Bielefeld	1–2	Blackburn Rovers	Bielefelder Alm, Bielefeld
	Goal

1 August 2007	Huddersfield Town	1–2	Blackburn Rovers	Galpharm Stadium, Huddersfield
	Goal		Goal

4 August 2007	Preston North End	0–3	Blackburn Rovers	Deepdale, Preston
	Goal		Goal

=== Premier League ===
==== Results by matchday ====
Matchday	1	2	3	4	5	6	7	8	9	10	11	12	13	14	15	16	17	18	19	20	21	22	23	24	25	26	27	28	29	30	31	32	33	34	35	36	37	38
Ground	A	H	A	H	A	H	A	H	H	A	H	A	A	H	H	H	A	H	A	A	H	A	H	A	H	A	H	A	H	A	H	A	H	A	H	A	H	A
Result	W	D	D	W	D	L	W	W	W	W	D	L	D	L	W	L	L	L	D	W	W	W	D	D	D	L	W	W	D	L	W	D	D	L	D	W	W	L
Position	5	11	11	9	10	11	10	9	8	6	7	8	9	9	8	9	9	10	9	9	9	8	9	8	8	9	9	7	8	9	8	7	8	9	9	8	7	7

Source: worldfootball.net
A = Away; H = Home; W = Win; D = Draw; L = Loss

11 August 2007 1	Middlesbrough	1–2	Blackburn Rovers	Riverside Stadium, Middlesbrough
15:00	Downing 31'	Report	Santa Cruz 63'; Derbyshire 79'	Attendance: 25,058; Referee: Andre Marriner

19 August 2007 2	Blackburn Rovers	1–1	Arsenal	Ewood Park, Blackburn
15:00	Dunn 72'	Report	van Persie 18'	Attendance: 24,917; Referee: Alan Wiley

25 August 2007 3	Everton	1–1	Blackburn Rovers	Goodison Park, Liverpool
17:15	McFadden 74'		Santa Cruz 15'

2 September 2007 4	Blackburn Rovers	1–0	Manchester City	Ewood Park, Blackburn
15:00	McCarthy 16'	Report		Attendance: 26,881; Referee: Mike Dean

15 September 2007 5	Chelsea	0–0	Blackburn Rovers	Stamford Bridge, London
17:15	J. Cole (yellow card) 74'; Belletti (yellow card) 75'		Warnock (yellow card) 82'; Savage (yellow card) 84'

23 September 2007 6	Blackburn Rovers	0–1	Portsmouth	Ewood Park, Blackburn
15:00			Kanu 25'

29 September 2007 7	Sunderland	1–2	Blackburn Rovers	Stadium of Light, Sunderland
15:00	Leadbitter 90'		Bentley 53'; Santa Cruz 55'

7 October 2007 8	Blackburn Rovers	2–1	Birmingham City	Ewood Park, Blackburn
15:00	Bentley 15'; McCarthy 56' (pen.)		Jerome 68'

20 October 2007 9	Blackburn Rovers	4–2	Reading	Ewood Park, Blackburn
15:00	McCarthy 18', 82' (pen.); Santa Cruz 22'; Tugay 32'		Doyle 80' 90'

28 October 2007 10	Tottenham Hotspur	1–2	Blackburn Rovers	White Hart Lane, London
15:00	Keane 49' (pen.)		McCarthy 60'; Samba 90'

3 November 2007 11	Blackburn Rovers	0–0	Liverpool	Ewood Park, Blackburn
17:15		Report		Attendance: 30,033; Referee: Martin Atkinson

11 November 2007 12	Manchester United	2–0	Blackburn Rovers	Old Trafford, Manchester
15:00	Ronaldo 34', 35'	Report		Attendance: 75,710; Referee: Alan Wiley

25 November 2007 13	Fulham	2–2	Blackburn Rovers	Craven Cottage, London
15:00	Murphy 51' (pen.); Kamara 63'		Emerton 57'; Warnock 79'

28 November 2007 14	Blackburn Rovers	0–4	Aston Villa	Ewood Park, Blackburn
20:00			Carew 29'; Barry 53' (pen.); Young 81'; Harewood 89'

1 December 2007 15	Blackburn Rovers	3–1	Newcastle United	Ewood Park, Blackburn
15:00	Bentley 54', 67'; Tugay 90'		Martins 47'

9 December 2007 16	Blackburn Rovers	0–1	West Ham United	Ewood Park, Blackburn
16:00			Ashton 52'

15 December 2007 17	Wigan Athletic	5–3	Blackburn Rovers	DW Stadium, Wigan
15:00	Landzaat 10'; Bent 12', 66', 81'; Scharner 37'	Report	Santa Cruz 45', 50', 61'	Attendance: 16,489; Referee: Mark Clattenburg

23 December 2007 18	Blackburn Rovers	0–1	Chelsea	Ewood Park, Blackburn
16:10			J. Cole 22'

27 December 2007 19	Manchester City	2–2	Blackburn Rovers	City of Manchester Stadium, Manchester
19:45	Vassell 27'; Ryan Nelsen 30' (o.g.)		Santa Cruz 28', 84'

30 December 2007 20	Derby County	1–2	Blackburn Rovers	Pride Park Stadium, Derby
13:30	Oakley 27'; Lewis (yellow card) 38'		Nelsen (yellow card) 32'; Santa Cruz 39'; Bentley 42'; Mokoena (yellow card) 51'; Warnock (yellow card) 62'	Attendance: 30,048; Referee: Peter Walton

2 January 2008 21	Blackburn Rovers	1–0	Sunderland	Ewood Park, Blackburn
20:00	McCarthy 57' (pen.)

13 January 2008 22	Bolton Wanderers	1–2	Blackburn Rovers	Reebok Stadium, Horwich
16:00	Nolan 43'		Samba 53'; Roberts 90'

19 January 2008 23	Blackburn Rovers	1–1	Middlesbrough	Ewood Park, Blackburn
15:00	Derbyshire 75'		Wheater 13'

26 January 2008 24	Aston Villa	1–1	Blackburn Rovers	Villa Park, Birmingham
15:00	Young 73'		Santa Cruz 68'

2 February 2008 25	Blackburn Rovers	0–0	Everton	Ewood Park, Blackburn
15:00

11 February 2008 26	Arsenal	2–0	Blackburn Rovers	Emirates Stadium, London
20:00	Senderos 4'; Adebayor 90'

24 February 2008 27	Blackburn Rovers	4–1	Bolton Wanderers	Ewood Park, Blackburn
15:00	McCarthy 25' (pen.), 67' (pen.); Bentley 71'; Pedersen 90'		Davies 50'

1 March 2008 28	Newcastle United	0–1	Blackburn Rovers	St James' Park, Newcastle upon Tyne
15:00			Derbyshire 90'

8 March 2008 29	Blackburn Rovers	1–1	Fulham	Ewood Park, Blackburn
15:00	Pedersen 59'		Bullard 89'

15 March 2008 30	West Ham United	2–1	Blackburn Rovers	Upton Park, London
15:00	Ashton 39'; Sears 81'		Santa Cruz 19'

22 March 2008 31	Blackburn Rovers	3–1	Wigan Athletic	Ewood Park, Blackburn
15:00	Santa Cruz 12', 63'; Roberts 45'		King 17' (pen.)

29 March 2008 32	Reading	0–0	Blackburn Rovers	Madejski Stadium, Reading
15:00

5 April 2008 33	Blackburn Rovers	1–1	Tottenham Hotspur	Ewood Park, Blackburn
15:00	Pedersen 30'		Berbatov 7'

13 April 2008 34	Liverpool	3–1	Blackburn Rovers	Anfield, Liverpool
13:30	Gerrard 62'; Torres 80'; Voronin 90'		Santa Cruz 90'

19 April 2008 35	Blackburn Rovers	1–1	Manchester United	Ewood Park, Blackburn
17:15	Santa Cruz 21'		Tevez 88'

27 April 2008 36	Portsmouth	0–1	Blackburn Rovers	Fratton Park, Portsmouth
13:30			Santa Cruz 74'

3 May 2008 37	Blackburn Rovers	3–1	Derby County	Ewood Park, Blackburn
15:00	Santa Cruz 45', 77'; Roberts 47'		Miller 19'

11 May 2008 38	Birmingham City	4–1	Blackburn Rovers	St Andrew's, Birmingham
15:00	Murphy 31'; Jerome 73', 89'; Muamba 90'		Pedersen 49'

=== League Cup ===
26 September 2007, 20:00 Round 3	Blackburn	3 – 0	Birmingham	Ewood Park, Blackburn
	Bentley 66'; Derbyshire 82' (pen.); Santa Cruz 90'			Attendance: 9,205

31 October 2007, 19:45 Round 4	Portsmouth	1 – 2	Blackburn	Fratton Park, Portsmouth
	Kanu 90'		McCarthy 11'; Pedersen 77'	Attendance: 11,788

18 December 2007, 20:00 Round 5	Blackburn	2 – 3 (a.e.t.)	Arsenal	Ewood Park, Blackburn
	Santa Cruz 42', 60'		Diaby 6'; Eduardo 29', 104'	Attendance: 16,207

=== FA Cup ===
5 January 2008, 15:00 Round 3	Blackburn	1 – 4	Coventry	Ewood Park, Blackburn
	Bentley 85'		Mifsud 34', 90'; Ward 64' (pen.); Adebloa 83'	Attendance: 14,421

=== UEFA Intertoto Cup ===
22 July 2007, 19:00 Round 3, Leg 1	FK Vetra (Lithuania)	0 – 2	Blackburn (England)	Vetra Stadium, Vilnius, Lithuania
			McCarthy 29'; Derbyshire 80'	Attendance: 5,200 (112 away); Referee: Tony Asumaa (Finland)

28 July 2007, 15:00 Round 3, Leg 2	Blackburn (England)	4 – 0	FK Vetra (Lithuania)	Ewood Park, Blackburn
	Pedersen 25'; Roberts 48'; McCarthy 54'; Samba 55'			Attendance: 11,854; Referee: Michael Weiner (Germany)

=== UEFA Cup ===
16 August 2007, 19:45 Qualifying round 2, Leg 1	MyPa-47 (Finland)	0 – 1	Blackburn (England)	Kymenlaakson Sähkö, Anjalankoski, Finland
			Santa Cruz 6'	Attendance: 2,012 (93 away); Referee: Olivier Thual (France)

30 August 2007, 20:05 Qualifying round 2, Leg 2	Blackburn (England)	2 – 0	MyPa-47 (Finland)	Ewood Park, Blackburn
	Bentley 48'; Roberts 90'			Attendance: 13,490; Referee: Thomas Einwaller (Austria)

20 September 2007, 17:00 Round 1, Leg 1	AEL (Greece)	2 – 0	Blackburn (England)	Alcazar Stadium, Larissa, Greece
	Bakayoko 33'; Cleyton 35'			Attendance: 8,126; Referee: Peter Sippel (Germany)

4 October 2007, 20:00 Round 1, Leg 2	Blackburn (England)	2 – 1	AEL (Greece)	Ewood Park, Blackburn
	Derbyshire 45' (pen.); Warnock 51'		Cleyton 17'	Attendance: 20,741 (1,200 away); Referee: Claudio Circhetta (Switzerland)
