= 2005–06 Blackburn Rovers F.C. season =

Blackburn Rovers
2005–06 season
- Chairman: John Williams
- Manager: Mark Hughes
- FA Premier League: 6th
- FA Cup: Fourth round
- League Cup: Semi-finals
- Top goalscorer: League: Craig Bellamy (13); All: Craig Bellamy (17)
- Highest home attendance: 29,142 (vs. Liverpool, 16 April)
- Lowest home attendance: 16,953 (vs. Fulham, 20 August)
- Average home league attendance: 21,015
Home colours	Away colours

During the 2005–06 season, Blackburn Rovers F.C. competed in the FA Premier League.

== Season summary ==
After relegation struggles during the two previous season, Mark Hughes marked his first full season in club management by taking Blackburn to sixth place - four points off Champions League qualification - and reaching his second successive cup semi-final, in the League Cup, only to be knocked out by the eventual cup winners again, Hughes' old club Manchester United. Blackburn had been in mid-table for much of the season before gathering momentum to put real pressure on Arsenal and Tottenham Hotspur in the race for the crucial fourth place, eventually finishing in a UEFA Cup place. Rovers' good form was largely in part down to the good form of Welsh striker Craig Bellamy, a summer signing from Newcastle United, who scored 13 goals in the league. However, Bellamy would then exercise an option to enable him to move for £6 million to a Champions League club, signing for FA Cup winners Liverpool. As his replacement Hughes signed South African striker Benni McCarthy, who had helped fire Porto to the Champions League title two years earlier.

== Final league table ==
Pos	Team	Pld	W	D	L	GF	GA	GD	Pts	Qualification or relegation
4	Arsenal	38	20	7	11	68	31	+37	67	Qualification for the Champions League third qualifying round
5	Tottenham Hotspur	38	18	11	9	53	38	+15	65	Qualification for the UEFA Cup first round (Note: Since Manchester United qualified for the Champions League, their place in the UEFA Cup as League Cup winners passed down to the league and was awarded to Blackburn Rovers as the highest-placed team not already qualified for European competitions.)
6	Blackburn Rovers	38	19	6	13	51	42	+9	63	Qualification for the UEFA Cup first round
7	Newcastle United	38	17	7	14	47	42	+5	58	Qualification for the Intertoto Cup third round
8	Bolton Wanderers	38	15	11	12	49	41	+8	56	

Source: Barclays Premier League
Rules for classification: 1) points; 2) goal difference; 3) number of goals scored.

== Results ==
Blackburn Rovers' score comes first

=== Legend ===
Win	Draw	Loss

=== FA Premier League ===
==== Results by matchday ====
Matchday	1	2	3	4	5	6	7	8	9	10	11	12	13	14	15	16	17	18	19	20	21	22	23	24	25	26	27	28	29	30	31	32	33	34	35	36	37	38
Ground	A	H	H	A	A	H	A	H	A	H	A	H	A	A	H	H	A	A	H	A	H	A	H	A	A	H	H	A	H	H	A	H	A	H	A	H	A	H
Result	L	W	D	L	D	L	W	W	L	W	L	W	D	L	L	W	L	W	W	W	D	W	W	L	L	W	W	L	W	W	W	D	D	L	L	W	W	W
Position	16	10	10	11	12	18	13	11	12	10	13	12	12	13	13	12	12	12	12	8	10	8	8	9	10	8	5	7	7	7	5	6	6	6	6	6	6	6

Source: worldfootball.net
A = Away; H = Home; W = Win; D = Draw; L = Loss

Date	Opponent	Venue	Result	Attendance	Scorers
13 August 2005	West Ham United	A	1–3	33,305	Todd
20 August 2005	Fulham	H	2–1	16,953	Pedersen, Tugay
24 August 2005	Tottenham Hotspur	H	0–0	22,375	
27 August 2005	Aston Villa	A	0–1	31,010	
11 September 2005	Bolton Wanderers	A	0–0	24,405	
18 September 2005	Newcastle United	H	0–3	20,725	
24 September 2005	Manchester United	A	2–1	67,765	Pedersen (2)
1 October 2005	West Bromwich Albion	H	2–0	20,721	Kuqi (2)
15 October 2005	Liverpool	A	0–1	44,697	
22 October 2005	Birmingham City	H	2–0	18,341	Dickov (pen), Bellamy
29 October 2005	Chelsea	A	2–4	41,553	Bellamy (2, 1 pen)
5 November 2005	Charlton Athletic	H	4–1	17,691	Emerton, Dickov, Pedersen, Bellamy
19 November 2005	Manchester City	A	0–0	44,032	
26 November 2005	Arsenal	A	0–3	38,192	
3 December 2005	Everton	H	0–2	22,064	
10 December 2005	West Ham United	H	3–2	20,370	Dickov (2, 1 pen), Kuqi
17 December 2005	Fulham	A	1–2	20,138	Knight (own goal)
26 December 2005	Middlesbrough	A	2–0	29,881	Kuqi (2)
31 December 2005	Wigan Athletic	A	3–0	20,639	Pedersen, Reid, Bellamy
2 January 2006	Portsmouth	H	2–1	19,521	Pedersen, Dickov
14 January 2006	Bolton Wanderers	H	0–0	18,180	
21 January 2006	Newcastle United	A	1–0	51,323	Pedersen
1 February 2006	Manchester United	H	4–3	25,484	Bentley (3), Neill (pen)
4 February 2006	West Bromwich Albion	A	0–2	23,993	
11 February 2006	Everton	A	0–1	35,615	
15 February 2006	Sunderland	H	2–0	18,220	Bellamy (2)
25 February 2006	Arsenal	H	1–0	22,504	Pedersen
5 March 2006	Tottenham Hotspur	A	2–3	36,080	Sinama Pongolle, Bellamy
11 March 2006	Aston Villa	H	2–0	21,932	Todd, Bellamy
18 March 2006	Middlesbrough	H	3–2	18,681	Bellamy (2), Pedersen
25 March 2006	Sunderland	A	1–0	29,593	Reid
3 April 2006	Wigan Athletic	H	1–1	20,410	Kuqi
8 April 2006	Portsmouth	A	2–2	20,048	Bellamy (2)
16 April 2006	Liverpool	H	0–1	29,142	
19 April 2006	Birmingham City	A	1–2	25,287	Savage
29 April 2006	Charlton Athletic	A	2–0	26,254	Reid, Powell (own goal)
2 May 2006	Chelsea	H	1–0	20,243	Reid
7 May 2006	Manchester City	H	2–0	25,731	Khizanishvili, Kuqi

=== FA Cup ===
Round	Date	Opponent	Venue	Result	Attendance	Goalscorers
R3	7 January 2006	Queens Park Rangers	H	3–0	12,705	Todd, Bellamy (2)
R4	28 January 2006	West Ham United	A	2–4	23,700	Bentley, Neill

=== League Cup ===
Round	Date	Opponent	Venue	Result	Attendance	Goalscorers
R2	21 September 2005	Huddersfield Town	H	3–1	11,755	Bellamy (2), Khizanishvili
R3	25 October 2005	Leeds United	H	3–0	15,631	Emerton, Dickov, Neill
R4	30 November 2005	Charlton Athletic	A	3–2	14,093	Kuqi, Thompson, Bentley
R5	21 December 2005	Middlesbrough	A	1–0	14,710	Dickov
SF 1st Leg	11 January 2006	Manchester United	H	1–1	24,348	Pedersen
SF 2nd Leg	25 January 2006	Manchester United	A	1–2 (lost 2–3 on agg)	61,637	Reid

== First-team squad ==
Squad at end of season

Note: Flags indicate national team as defined under FIFA eligibility rules; some limited exceptions apply. Players may hold more than one non-FIFA nationality.

No.	Pos.	Nation	Player
1	GK	USA	Brad Friedel
2	DF	AUS	Lucas Neill
3	DF	GEO	Zurab Khizanishvili
4	DF	ENG	Andy Todd
6	DF	NZL	Ryan Nelsen (captain)
7	MF	AUS	Brett Emerton
8	MF	WAL	Robbie Savage
9	FW	FIN	Shefki Kuqi (Note: Kuqi was born in Vushtrri, Kosovo (then SFR Yugoslavia).)
10	FW	SCO	Paul Dickov
11	FW	WAL	Craig Bellamy
12	MF	NOR	Morten Gamst Pedersen
13	GK	FIN	Peter Enckelman
14	MF	IRL	Steven Reid (Note: Reid was born in Kingston upon Thames, England, but also qualified to represent the Republic of Ireland internationally through his father, and made his international debut for the Republic of Ireland in 2001.)
15	MF	RSA	Aaron Mokoena
16	MF	TUR	Tugay Kerimoğlu
17	FW	FRA	Florent Sinama Pongolle (on loan from Liverpool)

No.	Pos.	Nation	Player
18	DF	SVK	Vratislav Greško
20	FW	SCO	Paul Gallagher
21	DF	SCO	Dominic Matteo
23	DF	ITA	Lorenzo Amoruso
24	DF	ENG	Jay McEveley (Note: McEveley was born in Liverpool, England, but also qualified to represent Scotland internationally and would make his full international debut for Scotland in August 2007.)
25	FW	USA	Jemal Johnson
26	DF	ENG	Andy Taylor
27	FW	ENG	Matt Derbyshire
28	MF	SCO	Gary Harkins
29	FW	ENG	David Bentley
30	GK	ENG	Richard Lee (on loan from Watford)
31	MF	GER	Sergio Peter
32	DF	IRL	Eddie Nolan
33	DF	ENG	Michael Gray
34	DF	NIR	Tony Kane

=== Left club during season ===
Note: Flags indicate national team as defined under FIFA eligibility rules; some limited exceptions apply. Players may hold more than one non-FIFA nationality.

No.	Pos.	Nation	Player
5	MF	ENG	Garry Flitcroft (to Sheffield United)
17	FW	ENG	Matt Jansen (to Bolton Wanderers)

No.	Pos.	Nation	Player
19	MF	ENG	David Thompson (to Wigan Athletic)
22	MF	IRL	Jonathan Douglas (on loan to Leeds United)

== Reserve squad ==
Note: Flags indicate national team as defined under FIFA eligibility rules; some limited exceptions apply. Players may hold more than one non-FIFA nationality.

No.	Pos.	Nation	Player
—	GK	ENG	Steven Drench
—	DF	SCO	Craig Barr

== Statistics ==
=== Appearances and goals ===
No.	Pos	Nat	Player	Total		Premier League		FA Cup		League Cup	
No.	Pos	Nat	Player	Apps	Goals	Apps	Goals	Apps	Goals	Apps	Goals
Goalkeepers
1	GK	(United States) USA	Brad Friedel	46	0	38	0	2	0	6	0
Defenders
2	DF	(Australia) AUS	Lucas Neill	42	3	35	1	2	1	5	1
3	DF	(Georgia (country)) GEO	Zurab Khizanishvili	32	2	24+2	1	2	0	4	1
4	DF	(England) ENG	Andy Todd	28	3	20+2	2	2	1	4	0
6	DF	(New Zealand) NZL	Ryan Nelsen	36	0	31	0	0	0	5	0
18	DF	(Slovakia) SVK	Vratislav Greško	3	0	1+2	0	0	0	0	0
21	DF	(Scotland) SCO	Dominic Matteo	7	0	6	0	1	0	0	0
33	DF	(England) ENG	Michael Gray	37	0	30	0	1	0	6	0
Midfielders
7	MF	(Australia) AUS	Brett Emerton	37	2	17+13	1	0+1	0	3+3	1
8	MF	(Wales) WAL	Robbie Savage	42	1	34	1	2	0	6	0
12	MF	(Norway) NOR	Morten Gamst Pedersen	42	10	34	9	1+1	0	5+1	1
14	MF	(Republic of Ireland) IRL	Steven Reid	39	5	31+3	4	1	0	2+2	1
15	MF	(South Africa) RSA	Aaron Mokoena	26	0	4+18	0	1	0	0+3	0
16	MF	(Turkey) TUR	Tugay Kerimoğlu	34	1	23+4	1	1+1	0	5	0
29	MF	(England) ENG	David Bentley	35	5	23+6	3	1	1	5	1
31	MF	(Germany) GER	Sergio Peter	10	0	1+7	0	1	0	0+1	0
Forwards
9	FW	(Finland) FIN	Shefki Kuqi	41	8	15+18	7	1+1	0	4+2	1
10	FW	(Scotland) SCO	Paul Dickov	26	7	17+4	5	1	0	3+1	2
11	FW	(Wales) WAL	Craig Bellamy	32	17	22+5	13	1	2	3+1	2
17	FW	(France) FRA	Florent Sinama Pongolle	10	1	8+2	1	0	0	0	0
20	FW	(Scotland) SCO	Paul Gallagher	1	0	0+1	0	0	0	0	0
25	FW	(United States) USA	Jemal Johnson	4	0	0+3	0	0+1	0	0	0
Players transferred out during the season
5	MF	(England) ENG	Garry Flitcroft	2	0	1+1	0	0	0	0	0
17	FW	(England) ENG	Matt Jansen	5	0	1+3	0	0	0	0+1	0
19	MF	(England) ENG	David Thompson	8	1	2+4	0	1	0	0+1	1

Last updated: 19 May 2006
Source: Competitions
