= 2006–07 Blackburn Rovers F.C. season =

Blackburn Rovers
2006–07 season
- Manager: Mark Hughes
- FA Premier League: 10th
- FA Cup: Semi-finals
- League Cup: Third round
- UEFA Cup: Round of 32
- Top goalscorer: League: Benni McCarthy (18); All: Benni McCarthy (24)
- Highest home attendance: 29,342 (vs. Liverpool, 26 December 2006)
- Lowest home attendance: 16,035 (vs. Watford, 18 April 2007)
- Average home league attendance: 21,275

During the 2006–07 English football season, Blackburn Rovers F.C. competed in the FA Premier League.

== Season summary ==
A run of only five wins from their first 18 games killed off Blackburn's hopes of improving on the previous season's 6th place to qualify for the Champions League, but the club's form was markedly improved in the second half of the season. Rovers overcame the sale of Craig Bellamy to Liverpool, with his replacement, former Porto striker Benni McCarthy, scoring 18 league goals to finish as the Premier League's second-highest scorer behind Didier Drogba.

The Rovers had a successful UEFA Cup campaign, defeating Red Bull Salzburg in the first round and topping Group E in the next stage, before falling to Bayer Leverkusen in the Round of 32. The club also continued its recent trend of reaching cup semi-finals only to be eliminated by the eventual winners, exiting the FA Cup semi-final at the hands of Chelsea.

== Final league table ==
Pos	Team	Pld	W	D	L	GF	GA	GD	Pts	Qualification or relegation
8	Reading	38	16	7	15	52	47	+5	55	
9	Portsmouth	38	14	12	12	45	42	+3	54	
10	Blackburn Rovers	38	15	7	16	52	54	−2	52	Qualification for the Intertoto Cup third round (Note: The highest-placed team who applied for the Intertoto Cup and not in an automatic UEFA Cup spot was awarded with a place in that competition. Blackburn Rovers occupied the Intertoto place, because Portsmouth and Reading did not apply. A further place in the UEFA Cup was up for grabs via the Premiership Fair Play League. The winner is placed into a draw with the winners of Fair Play leagues in other countries. The representatives from the two countries that come out of the hat first are given a place in the UEFA Cup first qualifying round. Since the winners of the Premiership Fair Play League, Tottenham Hotspur, had already qualified for the UEFA Cup by virtue of their league position, their place in the Fair Play draw was given to Aston Villa. However, the places in the UEFA Cup were awarded to the representatives from Finland and Norway.)
11	Aston Villa	38	11	17	10	43	41	+2	50	
12	Middlesbrough	38	12	10	16	44	49	−5	46	

Source: Barclays Premier League
Rules for classification: 1) points; 2) goal difference; 3) number of goals scored.

== Squad ==
Note: Flags indicate national team as defined under FIFA eligibility rules; some limited exceptions apply. Players may hold more than one non-FIFA nationality.

No.	Pos.	Nation	Player
1	GK	USA	Brad Friedel
3	DF	GEO	Zurab Khizanishvili
4	DF	ENG	Andy Todd
5	MF	TUR	Tugay Kerimoğlu
6	DF	NZL	Ryan Nelsen (captain)
7	MF	AUS	Brett Emerton
8	MF	WAL	Robbie Savage (vice captain)
9	FW	COD	Shabani Nonda (Note: Nonda was born in Bujumbura, Burundi, but also qualified to represent the DR Congo internationally and made his international debut for the DR Congo in 2000.) (on loan from Roma)
10	FW	RSA	Benni McCarthy
11	FW	ENG	David Bentley
12	MF	NOR	Morten Gamst Pedersen
14	MF	IRL	Steven Reid (Note: Reid was born in Kingston upon Thames, England, but also qualified to represent the Republic of Ireland internationally through his father, and made his international debut for the Republic of Ireland in 2001.)
15	MF	RSA	Aaron Mokoena

No.	Pos.	Nation	Player
16	DF	SUI	Stéphane Henchoz
18	FW	SCO	Paul Gallagher
19	MF	ENG	David Dunn
20	DF	NED	André Ooijer
21	DF	CGO	Christopher Samba (Note: Samba was born in Créteil, France, but also qualified to represent the Republic of the Congo internationally and made his international debut for the Congo in 2004.)
22	DF	ENG	Stephen Warnock
23	GK	WAL	Jason Brown (Note: Brown was born in Southwark, London, England, but also qualified to represent Wales internationally, and made his full international debut for Wales in May 2006.)
25	DF	SUI	Bruno Berner
27	FW	ENG	Matt Derbyshire
30	FW	GRN	Jason Roberts (Note: Roberts was born in Park Royal, London, England, but also qualified to represent Grenada internationally through his father, and made his international debut for Grenada in 1999.)
31	MF	GER	Sergio Peter
32	DF	IRL	Eddie Nolan
33	DF	ENG	Michael Gray

=== Left club during season ===
Note: Flags indicate national team as defined under FIFA eligibility rules; some limited exceptions apply. Players may hold more than one non-FIFA nationality.

No.	Pos.	Nation	Player
2	DF	AUS	Lucas Neill (to West Ham United)
9	FW	FIN	Shefki Kuqi (Note: Kuqi was born in Vushtrri, Kosovo (then SFR Yugoslavia).) (to Crystal Palace)
17	FW	ENG	Francis Jeffers (on loan to Ipswich Town)

No.	Pos.	Nation	Player
21	DF	SCO	Dominic Matteo (to Stoke City)
22	MF	IRL	Jonathan Douglas (to Leeds United)
24	DF	SCO	Jay McEveley (Note: McEveley was born in Liverpool, England, but also qualified to represent Scotland internationally and would make his international debut for Scotland in August 2007.) (to Derby County)

=== Reserve squad ===
The following players did not appear for the senior team this season.

Note: Flags indicate national team as defined under FIFA eligibility rules; some limited exceptions apply. Players may hold more than one non-FIFA nationality.

No.	Pos.	Nation	Player
13	GK	FIN	Peter Enckelman
22	MF	IRL	Jonathan Douglas
26	DF	ENG	Andy Taylor
28	GK	ENG	Frank Fielding
29	MF	IRL	Keith Treacy
34	DF	IRL	Tony Kane (Note: Kane was born in Belfast, Northern Ireland, and has represented Northern Ireland at youth level, but later chose to represent the Republic of Ireland internationally at level. He would however later switch allegiances back and was called up to the Northern Ireland squad in November 2007.)
—	GK	ENG	Zak Jones
—	DF	ENG	Dean Winnard
—	DF	SWE	Martin Olsson

No.	Pos.	Nation	Player
—	MF	ENG	Josh O'Keefe
—	MF	SCO	Bryan Hodge (on loan to Mansfield Town)
—	MF	IRL	Alan Judge
—	MF	ITA	Raffaele De Vita
—	MF	AUS	Rostyn Griffiths
—	FW	ENG	Keith Barker (on loan to Rochdale)
—	FW	ENG	Jamie Clarke
—	FW	ENG	Joe Garner (on loan to Carlisle United)

== Statistics ==
=== Appearances and goals ===
No.	Pos	Nat	Player	Total		Premier League		FA Cup		League Cup		UEFA Cup	
No.	Pos	Nat	Player	Apps	Goals	Apps	Goals	Apps	Goals	Apps	Goals	Apps	Goals
Goalkeepers
1	GK	(United States) USA	Brad Friedel	53	0	38	0	6	0	1	0	8	0
23	GK	(Wales) WAL	Jason Brown	1	0	0+1	0	0	0	0	0	0	0
Defenders
3	DF	(Georgia (country)) GEO	Zurab Khizanishvili	30	0	17+1	0	3+2	0	1	0	6	0
4	DF	(England) ENG	Andy Todd	13	0	6+3	0	1+1	0	0	0	1+1	0
6	DF	(New Zealand) NZL	Ryan Nelsen	19	0	12	0	5	0	0	0	2	0
7	DF	(Australia) AUS	Brett Emerton	47	0	32+2	0	5+1	0	1	0	6	0
16	DF	(Switzerland) SUI	Stéphane Henchoz	16	0	10+2	0	1+1	0	1	0	1	0
20	DF	(Netherlands) NED	André Ooijer	27	0	20	0	1	0	0	0	6	0
21	DF	(Republic of the Congo) CGO	Christopher Samba	19	2	13+1	2	4+1	0	0	0	0	0
22	DF	(England) ENG	Stephen Warnock	20	1	13	1	5	0	0	0	2	0
25	DF	(Switzerland) SUI	Bruno Berner	2	0	1	0	1	0	0	0	0	0
32	DF	(Republic of Ireland) IRL	Eddie Nolan	1	0	0	0	0	0	0	0	0+1	0
33	DF	(England) ENG	Michael Gray	13	0	10+1	0	0	0	0	0	2	0
Midfielders
5	MF	(Turkey) TUR	Tugay Kerimoğlu	40	2	26+4	1	3	0	0	0	7	1
8	MF	(Wales) WAL	Robbie Savage	27	2	21	0	0	0	0	0	6	2
11	MF	(England) ENG	David Bentley	51	7	36	4	6	0	1	0	8	3
12	MF	(Norway) NOR	Morten Gamst Pedersen	49	8	36	6	5	2	1	0	6+1	0
14	MF	(Republic of Ireland) IRL	Steven Reid	3	0	3	0	0	0	0	0	0	0
15	MF	(South Africa) RSA	Aaron Mokoena	40	1	18+9	0	6	1	1	0	2+4	0
19	MF	(England) ENG	David Dunn	16	0	7+4	0	2+1	0	0	0	2	0
31	MF	(Germany) GER	Sergio Peter	16	0	1+8	0	0+2	0	0+1	0	1+3	0
Forwards
9	FW	(Democratic Republic of the Congo) COD	Shabani Nonda	36	8	17+9	7	2	0	1	0	4+3	1
10	FW	(South Africa) RSA	Benni McCarthy	50	24	36	18	3+2	3	1	0	7+1	3
18	FW	(Scotland) SCO	Paul Gallagher	22	2	2+14	1	1+1	1	0	0	2+2	0
27	FW	(England) ENG	Matt Derbyshire	30	9	8+14	5	4+2	4	0	0	2	0
30	FW	(Grenada) GRN	Jason Roberts	25	5	9+9	4	1+2	1	0+1	0	1+2	0
Players transferred out during the season
2	DF	(Australia) AUS	Lucas Neill	26	1	20	0	0	0	1	0	5	1
9	FW	(Finland) FIN	Shefki Kuqi	2	0	0+1	0	0	0	0	0	0+1	0
17	FW	(England) ENG	Francis Jeffers	15	1	3+7	0	0+1	0	0+1	0	0+3	1
24	DF	(England) ENG	Jay McEveley	7	0	3+1	0	1	0	1	0	1	0

Last updated: 15 May 2007
Source: Competitions

== Transfers ==
=== In ===
- (Wales) Jason Brown – (England) Gillingham, free, 26 June
- (England) Francis Jeffers – (England) Charlton Athletic, free, 3 July
- (Grenada) Jason Roberts – (England) Wigan Athletic, 3 July, undisclosed
- (South Africa) Benni McCarthy – (Portugal) Porto, 28 July, undisclosed (believed to be £2,500,000)
- (Netherlands) André Ooijer – (Netherlands) PSV Eindhoven, 23 August, £2,000,000
- (Democratic Republic of the Congo) Shabani Nonda – (Italy) Roma, season loan, 31 August
- (Switzerland) Stéphane Henchoz – (England) Wigan Athletic, free, 8 September
- (England) David Dunn – (England) Birmingham City, £2,200,000, 17 January
- (England) Stephen Warnock – (England) Liverpool, undisclosed (believed to be £2,500,000), 22 January
- (Republic of the Congo) Christopher Samba – (Germany) Hertha Berlin, £450,000, 25 January
- (Switzerland) Bruno Berner – (Switzerland) FC Basel, 30 January, nominal

=== Out ===
- (Wales) Craig Bellamy – (England) Liverpool, undisclosed (thought to be £6,000,000), 22 June
- (Finland) Shefki Kuqi – (England) Crystal Palace, £2,500,000, 1 September
- (Scotland) Dominic Matteo – (England) Stoke City, free, 19 January
- (Australia) Lucas Neill – (England) West Ham United, £1,500,000, 22 January
- (Scotland) Jay McEveley – (England) Derby County, £600,000, 29 January
- (England) Francis Jeffers – (England) Ipswich Town, loan, 2 March

== Results ==
=== Premier League ===
==== Results by matchday ====
Matchday	1	2	3	4	5	6	7	8	9	10	11	12	13	14	15	16	17	18	19	20	21	22	23	24	25	26	27	28	29	30	31	32	33	34	35	36	37	38
Ground	A	H	H	A	H	A	H	A	H	A	A	H	H	A	H	H	A	A	H	H	A	H	A	A	A	H	A	H	A	H	A	H	H	A	H	A	A	H
Result	L	D	L	D	W	W	W	D	L	L	L	L	D	L	W	L	W	L	W	W	W	L	W	L	L	W	L	W	W	L	L	L	W	D	W	W	D	D
Position	18	16	20	19	13	10	9	9	10	11	13	15	15	17	14	17	16	17	15	14	11	12	10	12	12	10	11	10	10	10	10	11	10	10	10	10	10	10

Source: worldfootball.net
A = Away; H = Home; W = Win; D = Draw; L = Loss

19 August 2006 1	Portsmouth	3–0	Blackburn Rovers	Portsmouth
15:00	Svetoslav Todorov 26'; Nwankwo Kanu 62', 84'	Report		Stadium: Fratton Park

23 August 2006 2	Blackburn Rovers	1–1	Everton	Blackburn
	Benni McCarthy 50'	Report	Tim Cahill 84'	Stadium: Ewood Park

27 August 2006 3	Blackburn Rovers	0–2	Chelsea	Blackburn
		Report	Frank Lampard 50' (pen.); Didier Drogba 81'	Stadium: Ewood Park

9 September 2006 4	Sheffield United	0–0	Blackburn Rovers	Sheffield
15:00				Stadium: Bramall Lane

17 September 2006 5	Blackburn Rovers	4–2	Manchester City	Blackburn
	Trevor Sinclair 18' (o.g.); Morten Gamst Pedersen 44'; Benni McCarthy 66'; Paul Gallagher 89'		Joey Barton 39'; André Ooijer 45' (o.g.)	Stadium: Ewood Park

23 September 2006 6	Middlesbrough	0–1	Blackburn Rovers	Middlesbrough
			Shabani Nonda 27'	Stadium: Riverside Stadium

1 October 2006 7	Blackburn Rovers	2–1	Wigan Athletic	Blackburn
	David Bentley 45'; Benni McCarthy 81'		Emile Heskey 2'	Stadium: Ewood Park

14 October 2006 8	Liverpool	1–1	Blackburn Rovers	Anfield, Liverpool
	Craig Bellamy 64'		Benni McCarthy 17'	Stadium: Anfield

22 October 2006 9	Blackburn Rovers	0–1	Bolton Wanderers	Blackburn
			Iván Campo 62'	Stadium: Ewood Park; Attendance: 27,662 (7,700 away)

29 October 2006 10	West Ham	2–1	Blackburn Rovers	Upton Park, London
16:00	Teddy Sheringham 21'; Hayden Mullins 80'		David Bentley 90'	Stadium: Boleyn Ground

5 November 2006 11	Aston Villa	2–0	Blackburn Rovers	Aston, Birmingham
	Gareth Barry 41' (pen.); Juan Pablo Ángel 50'			Stadium: Villa Park

11 November 2006 12	Blackburn Rovers	0–1	Manchester United	Blackburn
			Louis Saha 64'	Stadium: Ewood Park

19 November 2006 13	Blackburn Rovers	1–1	Tottenham	Blackburn
	Tugay 23'		Jermain Defoe 62' (pen.)	Stadium: Ewood Park

2 December 2006 14	Blackburn Rovers	2–0	Fulham	Blackburn
	Shabani Nonda 6'; Benni McCarthy 24'			Stadium: Ewood Park

5 December 2006 15	Charlton	1–0	Blackburn Rovers	Charlton, London
	Talal El Karkouri 90'			Stadium: The Valley

9 December 2006 16	Blackburn Rovers	1–3	Newcastle	Blackburn
	Morten Gamst Pedersen 47'		Obafemi Martins 31'; Steven Taylor 35'; Obafemi Martins 90'	Stadium: Ewood Park

16 December 2006 17	Reading	1–2	Blackburn Rovers	Reading
	James Harper 41'		Benni McCarthy 64'; David Bentley 84'	Stadium: Madejski Stadium

23 December 2006 18	Arsenal	6–2	Blackburn Rovers	Holloway, London
	Gilberto Silva 10'; Hleb 23'; Adebayor 27' (pen.) van Persie 85', 88'; Flamini 90'		Nonda 3' (pen.), 69'	Stadium: Emirates Stadium

26 December 2006 19	Blackburn Rovers	1–0	Liverpool	Blackburn
	Benni McCarthy 49'			Stadium: Ewood Park

30 December 2006 20	Blackburn Rovers	2–1	Middlesbrough	Blackburn
	Shabani Nonda 9'; Benni McCarthy 74'		Yakubu 61' (pen.)	Stadium: Ewood Park

1 January 2007 21	Wigan Athletic	0–3	Blackburn Rovers	Wigan
			Emile Heskey 37' (o.g.); Matt Derbyshire 58'; Benni McCarthy 76' (pen.)	Stadium: JJB Stadium

13 January 2007 22	Blackburn Rovers	0–2	Arsenal	Blackburn
			Kolo Touré 37'; Thierry Henry 71'	Stadium: Ewood Park

20 January 2007 23	Manchester City	0–3	Blackburn Rovers	Manchester
			Pedersen 44', 62'; Derbyshire 90'	Stadium: City of Manchester Stadium

23 January 2007 24	Watford	2–1	Blackburn Rovers	Watford
	Brett Emerton 12' (o.g.); Jay Demerit 70'		Benni McCarthy 45'	Stadium: Vicarage Road

31 January 2007 25	Chelsea	3–0	Blackburn Rovers	Fulham, London
	Didier Drogba 6'; Frank Lampard 67'; Salomon Kalou 90'			Stadium: Stamford Bridge (stadium)

3 February 2007 26	Blackburn Rovers	2–1	Sheffield United	Blackburn
	Pedersen 22', 90'		Stead 25'	Stadium: Ewood Park

10 February 2007 27	Everton	1–0	Blackburn Rovers	Walton, Liverpool
	Andrew Johnson 10'			Stadium: Goodison Park

25 February 2007 28	Blackburn Rovers	3–0	Portsmouth	Blackburn
	Shabani Nonda 1', 25'; Stephen Warnock 50'			Stadium: Ewood Park

4 March 2007 29	Bolton Wanderers	1–2	Blackburn Rovers	Horwich, Bolton
	Anelka 87'		McCarthy 58' (pen.), 68' (pen.)	Stadium: Reebok Stadium

17 March 2007 30	Blackburn Rovers	1–2	West Ham	Blackburn
	Christopher Samba 47'		Carlos Tevez 71' (pen.); Bobby Zamora 75'	Stadium: Ewood Park

31 March 2007 31	Manchester United	4–1	Blackburn Rovers	Manchester
	Paul Scholes 61'; Michael Carrick 73'; Park Ji-sung 83'; Ole Gunnar Solskjær 90'		Matt Derbyshire 29'	Stadium: Old Trafford; Attendance: 76,098

7 April 2007 32	Blackburn Rovers	1–2	Aston Villa	Blackburn
	Benni McCarthy 24' (pen.)		Patrik Berger 34'; Gabriel Agbonlahor 73'	Stadium: Ewood Park

18 April 2007 33	Blackburn Rovers	3–1	Watford	Blackburn
	Christopher Samba 7'; Jason Roberts 10'; Benni McCarthy 32'		Douglas Rinaldi 21'	Stadium: Ewood Park

21 April 2007 34	Fulham	1–1	Blackburn Rovers	Fulham, London
	Vincenzo Montella 10'		Benni McCarthy 61'	Stadium: Craven Cottage

28 April 2007 35	Blackburn Rovers	4–1	Charlton	Blackburn
	Roberts 60', 80'; Hreiðarsson 77' (o.g.); Derbyshire 83'		Darren Bent 71'	Stadium: Ewood Park

5 May 2007 36	Newcastle	0–2	Blackburn Rovers	Newcastle upon Tyne
			Benni McCarthy 14'; Jason Roberts 73'	Stadium: St James' Park

10 May 2007 37	Tottenham	1–1	Blackburn Rovers	Tottenham, London
	Jermain Defoe 67'		Benni McCarthy 32'	Stadium: White Hart Lane

13 May 2007 38	Blackburn Rovers	3–3	Reading	Blackburn
	Benni McCarthy 21'; David Bentley 56'; Matt Derbyshire 67'		Seol Ki-Hyeon 36'; Kevin Doyle 58'; Brynjar Gunnarsson 77'	Stadium: Ewood Park

=== League Cup ===
Round 3	Blackburn Rovers	0–2	Chelsea
			Joe Cole; Kalou	Attendance: 14,732

=== FA Cup ===
7 January 2007 Round 3	Everton	1–4	Blackburn Rovers
	Johnson (pen)		Derbyshire; Pedersen; Gallagher; McCarthy	Attendance: 24,426

27 January 2007 Round 4	Luton Town	0–4	Blackburn Rovers
		Report	Derbyshire (2); McCarthy; Pedersen	Attendance: 5,887

Round 5	Arsenal	0–0	Blackburn Rovers
		Report		Attendance: 56,761

Round 5 Replay	Blackburn Rovers	1–0	Arsenal
	McCarthy	Report		Attendance: 18,882

11 March 2007 Round 6	Blackburn Rovers	2–0	Manchester City	Blackburn
16:00	Mokoena 28'; Derbyshire 90'	Report		Stadium: Ewood Park; Attendance: 27,743; Referee: Mike Dean

15 April 2007 Semi; Final	Blackburn Rovers	1–2 (a.e.t.)	Chelsea	Manchester
16:00 GMT	Roberts 64'	Report	Lampard 16'; Ballack 109'	Stadium: Old Trafford; Attendance: 50,559; Referee: Alan Wiley

=== UEFA Cup ===
==== First round ====
14 September 2006	Red Bull Salzburg	2–2	Blackburn Rovers	Wals-Siezenheim, Austria
19:45	Zickler 32'; Janko 90'		Savage 32'; McCarthy 39'	Attendance: 17,000 (529 away); Referee: Tomasz Mikulski (Poland)

28 September 2006	Blackburn Rovers	2–0	Red Bull Salzburg	Blackburn, England
	McCarthy 32'; Bentley 56'	Report		Stadium: Ewood Park; Attendance: 18,888; Referee: Joao Francisco Lopes Ferreira (Portugal)

==== Group stage ====
19 October 2006	Wisła Kraków	1–2	Blackburn Rovers	Kraków, Poland
	Cantoro 28'	Report	Savage 56'; Bentley 90'	Stadium: Stadion Miejski; Attendance: 14,000 (400 away); Referee: (Sweden) Stefan Johannesson

2 November 2006	Blackburn Rovers	3–0	FC Basel	Blackburn, England
	Tugay 75'; Jeffers 89' (pen.); McCarthy 90'	Report		Stadium: Ewood Park; Attendance: 13,789; Referee: (Ukraine) Oleh Oriekhov

23 November 2006	Feyenoord	0–0	Blackburn Rovers	Rotterdam, Netherlands
		Report		Stadium: De Kuip; Attendance: 35,000 (2,500 away); Referee: (Germany) Knut Kircher

12 December 2006	Blackburn Rovers	1–0	Nancy	Blackburn, England
	Neill 90'	Report		Stadium: Ewood Park; Attendance: 12,568; Referee: (Austria) Gerald Lehner

==== Round of 32 ====
14 February 2007	Bayer Leverkusen	3–2	Blackburn Rovers	Leverkusen, Germany
18:15	Callsen-Bracker 18'; Ramelow 43'; Schneider 56'	Report	Bentley 38'; Nonda 87'	Stadium: BayArena; Attendance: 22,500 (1,125 away); Referee: Pieter Vink (Netherlands)

22 February 2007	Blackburn Rovers	0–0	Bayer Leverkusen	Blackburn, England
19:00		Report		Stadium: Ewood Park; Attendance: 25,124 (450 away); Referee: Alberto Undiano Mallenco (Spain)

== Top scorers ==
=== Premier League ===
- (South Africa) Benni McCarthy 18
- (Democratic Republic of the Congo) Shabani Nonda 7
- (Norway) Morten Gamst Pedersen 6
- (England) Matt Derbyshire 5
- (England) David Bentley 4
- (Grenada) Jason Roberts 4

=== League Cup ===
- n/a

=== FA Cup ===
- (England) Matt Derbyshire 4
- (South Africa) Benni McCarthy 3

=== UEFA Cup ===
- (England) David Bentley 3
- (South Africa) Benni McCarthy 3
