= Christopher Samba =

Congolese-French footballer (born 1984)

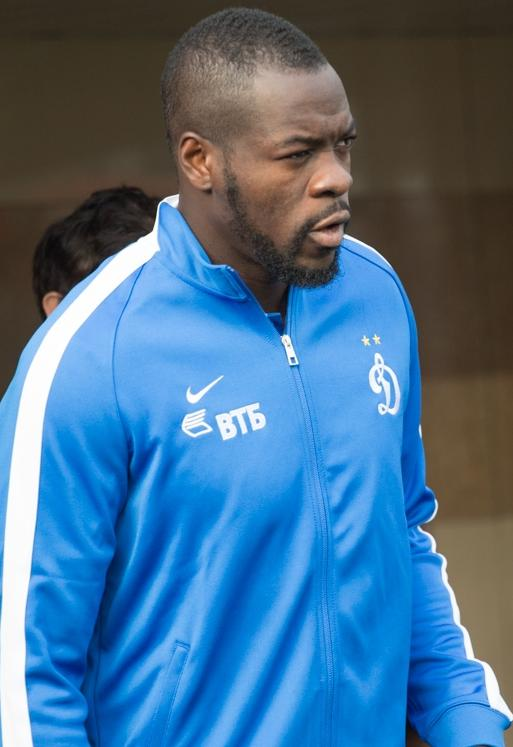
- Samba with Dynamo Moscow in 2014

Personal information
- Full name: Veijeany Christopher Samba
- Date of birth: 28 March 1984 (age 42)
- Place of birth: Créteil, France
- Height: 1.94 m (6 ft 4 in)
- Position: Defender

Youth career
- 1997–1999: D’Issy-les-Moulineaux
- 1999–2001: Rouen
- 2001–2002: Sedan

Senior career*
Years	Team	Apps	(Gls)
2002–2003	Sedan B	26	(0)
2003–2004	Sedan	3	(0)
2004–2006	Hertha BSC II	28	(4)
2004–2007	Hertha BSC	20	(0)
2007–2012	Blackburn Rovers	161	(16)
2012–2013	Anzhi Makhachkala	27	(3)
2013	Queens Park Rangers	10	(0)
2013	Anzhi Makhachkala	5	(1)
2013–2016	Dynamo Moscow	38	(6)
2016–2017	Panathinaikos	2	(0)
2017–2018	Aston Villa	12	(1)
Total		332	(31)

International career
2004–2013	Congo	26	(1)
- * Club domestic league appearances and goals

Veijeany Christopher Samba (born 28 March 1984) is a former professional footballer who played as a defender. Born in France, he played for the Congo national team.

Samba notably played in the Premier League for Blackburn Rovers where he played for five years, notching up 161 league appearances with 16 goals. He also played top flight football in England for Queens Park Rangers with a spell in the EFL Championship for Aston Villa. He also played for Sedan, Hertha BSC, Anzhi Makhachkala, Dynamo Moscow and Panathinaikos.

== Club career ==
=== Early career ===
Born in the Parisian suburb of Créteil, Samba began his career with French Ligue 2 club Sedan, having previously played for D’Issy-les-Moulineaux and Rouen. As a result, he left Créteil in his youth to move to Sedan. At one point, Samba played in a striker position before switching to a centre–back position. After progressing through the ranks of the Sedan's Academy, he made his debut for the club in the opening game of the season against FC Istres, starting a match before being sent–off in the 57th minute, in a 2–0 loss. However, after making two more appearances for the side, Samba suffered an adductors injury that kept him out for the rest of the 2003–04 season. His injury cost him his chance of earning his professional contract at Sedan and was released by the club at the end of the 2003–04 season.

=== Hertha BSC ===
Following his release by Sedan, Samba revealed that he "had lots of trials with clubs during that time, but none of them came off". He also said: "I had no club and I had to train by myself for a long period of time. I was 19 years old. I had to recover from the injury myself without a physio, no money. For six months I did not have a club and I was just training. I went to small teams like Rouen who did not even want to let me train with them." Eventually, Samba was signed by Berlin-based club Hertha BSC of the German Bundesliga after being scouted while on international duty at Congo.

Immediately after signing for Hertha BSC, Samba was assigned to Hertha BSC II. After making his Hertha BSC II debut, he then scored his first goal for the reserve side, in a 5–2 win against Preußen Münster on 27 March 2005. Samba later scored two more goals in the 2004–05 season, scoring against Borussia Dortmund II and Wuppertaler SV. At the end of the 2004–05 season, he went on to make sixteen appearances and scoring three times in all competitions.

Ahead of the 2005–06 season, Samba was called up to the first team for the first team and trained with the senior players at the pre–season training camp. He made his first team debut for Hertha BSC, coming on in the 86th minute and played for the rest of the game, as they beat TuS Koblenz in the first round of the DFB Cup. Seven days later on 26 August 2005, Samba made his league debut for the club, coming on as a 70th-minute substitute, in a 3–0 loss against Bayern Munich. Since making his debut for the club, Samba appeared in the first team, mostly coming from the substitute bench. But Samba often returned to play for the Hertha BSC II and scored once in twelve appearances. It was announced on 18 March 2006 that he signed a contract extension with the club, keeping him until 2008. However, as the 2005–06 season progressed, Samba suffered a hamstring injury that kept him out for the rest of the season. Despite this, he went on to make twelve appearances for the senior team in all competitions.

In the 2006–07 season, Samba continued to appear in the first team, mostly coming from the substitute bench. However throughout his time at Hertha BSC, he struggled to break into the Hertha first team and desired a move elsewhere in the January transfer window.

=== Blackburn Rovers ===
Having desire to move elsewhere, Samba was invited by Mark Hughes to undertake a five-day trial at Blackburn Rovers. He quickly made an impression at the trial that Hughes wanted to sign him. Two days later on 25 January 2007, he completed a transfer to Blackburn Rovers of the Premier League, signing a three-and-a-half-year deal for £450,000 and taking the number 21 shirt.

Samba made his Blackburn Rovers debut against Luton Town in the FA Cup Fourth Round as a 69th-minute substitute for Ryan Nelsen, as they won 4–0. Two days later on 31 January 2007, he made his Premiership debut on 31 January against Chelsea at Stamford Bridge in a 3–0 defeat. Since making his debut for the club, Samba quickly became a first team regular for the side. On 17 March 2007, he scored his first goal for Blackburn Rovers against West Ham United with a header in the 47th minute, coming in the 1–2 defeat at Ewood Park. Samba then scored his second goal for the club in a 3–1 victory over Watford at Ewood Park on 18 April 2007, playing the full 90 minutes with Ryan Nelsen at the centre of defence. Since making his debut for Blackburn Rovers, he quickly became a fan favourite among supporters and was named Newcomer of the Year Awards at the club's award ceremony. At the end of the 2006–07 season, he made 19 appearances, scoring two goals in fourteen Premier League games.

Following Samba's performances in his debut season, Samba established himself as a starter in the 2007–08 season and was given number 4 shirt. At the start of the 2007–08 season, he played in both legs of the third round of the UEFA Intertoto Cup match against FK Vėtra, scoring in the second leg, as they won 6–0 on aggregate. After missing a UEFA Cup against AEL Larissa, Samba returned to the starting line–up against Portsmouth on 23 September 2007, which they lost 1–0. On 22 October 2007, Blackburn announced Samba had signed a new long-term contract keeping him at the club until the summer of 2012. Six days later on 28 October 2007, he scored a last-minute strike to give the club a 2–1 win against Tottenham Hotspur. Since the start of the season, Samba appeared in every league match until he missed two separate matches in December, due to suspension and then was given a compassionate leave. Samba then scored his third goal of the season, in a 2–1 win against Bolton Wanderers on 12 January 2008. He later missed three matches, due to suspension, including his sending off against Wigan Athletic on 16 March 2008 for a tug on Emile Heskey. Despite this, Samba regained his first team place for the rest of the season. At one point during a 2–1 loss against West Ham United, he was involved in altercation with teammate David Dunn after conceding the equalising and the argument carried on in the dressing room at half-time. After the match, Manager Hughes commented about the argument, acknowledging the frustration taking place in a game. At the end of the 2007–08 season, Samba made a total of forty–one appearances and scoring three goals in all competitions.

At the start of the 2008–09 season, Samba continued to form a centre–back partnership with Nelsen. However, during a 4–1 loss against West Ham United on 30 August 2008, he scored an own goal in the 20th minute to give the opposition team a 2–0 lead. Almost a month later on 27 September 2008, Samba was able to make amends when he scored his first goal of the season, in a 2–1 win against Newcastle United. Since the start of the season, Samba started in every match until he missed out against Middlesbrough on 25 October 2008, due to a concussion. But Samba was able to return to the starting line–up four days later on 29 October 2008, in a 3–2 loss against Aston Villa. Two weeks later on 15 November 2008, he scored his second league goal of the season, in a 2–1 loss against Sunderland. Three months later on 15 February 2009, Samba scored his third goal of the season, in a 2–2 draw against Coventry City in the fifth round of the FA Cup. Although recognised predominantly as a defender, Samba made several appearances as a striker in the latter stages of the 2008–09 season. On 4 April 2009, with Blackburn losing 1–0 against Tottenham Hotspur, he started the second half up front. Blackburn went on to win 2–1, with manager Sam Allardyce claiming Samba's impact as "key to victory." During the next league match against Liverpool at Anfield on 11 April, he again started as a lone striker, with natural striker Benni McCarthy left on the bench. Samba continued to play as a striker in the next match against Wigan Athletic in the 2–0 win for Blackburn. For his performance, he was awarded Performance of the Season at the club's award ceremony. By the end of the season, Samba had made thirty–nine appearances and scoring three times in all competitions.

Ahead of the 2009–10 season, Samba was linked a move away from Blackburn Rovers, with clubs around Europe interested in signing him, but both Manager Sam Allardyce and the player, himself, dismissed of him leaving the club. He continued to start the season, regaining his first team place in the centre–back position. Samba scored his first goal of the 2009–10 season against Aston Villa on 26 September 2009. However, he was sidelined on two separate occasions throughout October. Despite this, Samba signed a new five-year contract with the club. Shortly after signing a contract extension, local newspaper The Lancashire Telegraph reported that Samba "must go down as one of the bargains in Premier League history". He then scored on his 100th Premier League start in a 2–0 victory over Fulham at Ewood Park on 17 January 2010. Three days later on 20 January 2010, however, Samba was sent–off in the 39th minute for unprofessional conduct, as Blackburn Rovers lost 6–4 to Aston Villa in the second leg of the League Cup semi–finals. After serving one match suspension, he was sent–off for a second bookable offence, in a 3–0 loss against Stoke City on 6 February 2010. After serving a two match suspension, Samba returned to the starting line–up, starting the whole game, in a 2–0 loss against Liverpool on 28 February 2010. He then netted his third league goal of the 2009–10 season on 13 March 2010 against in a 1–3 defeat to Tottenham at White Hart Lane. Samba featured for the next five matches before suffering an injury and was substituted in the 33rd minute during a 0–0 draw against Manchester United on 11 April 2010. On 3 May 2010, Samba scored the winning goal as Rovers beat Arsenal 2–1 at Ewood Park. He was also picked as captain for the game, despite club captain Ryan Nelsen and vice-captain David Dunn both starting. For his performance, Samba was awarded the Unsung Hero at the club's award ceremony. At the end of the 2009–10 season, Samba went on to make thirty–three appearances and scoring four times in all competitions.

At the start of the 2010–11 season, Samba captained the side in the opening game of the season against Everton and helped them win 1–0. He continued to regain his first team place in the centre–back position. Samba was appointed club captain for the 2010–11 season, with Nelsen moving to vice-captain. During a 1–1 draw against Manchester City on 13 September 2010, his performance earned him a Man of the Match Award for his impressive display after helping the opposition team keep the match a draw, "including last ditch block from Jô's close range effort". Five days later on 18 September 2010, he scored his first goal of the season, in a 1–1 draw against Fulham. Samba started in every match until he was sent–off in the 45th minute, in a 0–0 draw against Sunderland on 18 October 2010. After serving a one match suspension, Samba returned to the starting line–up, in a 2–1 loss against Chelsea on 30 October 2010. He then scored his second league goal of the season, in a 7–1 loss against Manchester United on 27 November 2010. During a 1–1 draw against West Ham United on 17 December 2010, Samba suffered an injury and was substituted in the 57th minute, leading him to be sidelined for weeks. While on the sidelines, he was stripped of the captaincy by new manager Steve Kean on 26 December after announcing his desire to leave Blackburn. Shortly after, Samba has his captaincy role returned following talks with Manager Kean. Despite having his captaincy role back, he still maintain his desire to leave Blackburn Rovers. Amid the transfer speculation, Samba returned to the starting line–up from injury, in a 3–1 win against Liverpool on 5 January 2011. Samba signed a new four-and-a-half-year deal on 2 February 2011 after the contract talks began the previous month. Three day later on 5 February 2011, he scored his third goal of the season, in a 4–3 loss against Wigan Athletic. After missing a match against Aston Villa on 26 February 2011, due to an illness, Samba then scored his fourth goal of the season a month later on 14 March 2011, in a 2–2 draw against Blackpool. He continued to regain his first team place for the rest of the season despite suffering from injuries along the way. Samba captained Rovers in their 3–2 win over Wolverhampton Wanderers at Molineux in the last Premier League match of the campaign to finish 15th place in the Premier League table and was shown with all the fans on the pitch at the final whistle. At the end of the campaign, he made 36 appearances and scored four goals in all competitions.

Ahead of the 2011–12 season, Samba continued to be linked a move away from Blackburn Rovers, but no offers were made for him throughout the summer transfer window and stayed at the club. He previously stated the previous April about leaving Blackburn Rovers in the summer transfer window. However, Samba missed the first two Premier League fixtures, due to a groin injury. He played his first game of the season on 27 August 2011, playing the full 90 minutes alongside Gaël Givet in the 0–1 defeat against Everton at Ewood Park. On 11 September 2011, Samba started alongside debut centre back Scott Dann in a 1–1 draw against Fulham at Craven Cottage but played 45 minutes due to a back injury and was substituted as a result. But he recovered and made his return to the starting line–up, playing the whole game alongside Dann in a 4–3 victory over Arsenal at Ewood Park. Since returning, Samba continued to regain his first team place, forming a partnership with Dann and resuming his captaincy role. On 15 October 2011, Samba scored his first goal of 2011–12 season against Queens Park Rangers in a 1–1 draw. He scored his second goal against Norwich City in a 3–3 draw on 29 October 2011. However, during a 1–0 loss against Chelsea on 5 November 2011, Samba suffered a hamstring injury and was substituted at half time, leading him to be sidelined throughout November. On 3 December 2011, he returned to the starting line–up against Swansea City and set up the club's third goal of the game, in a 4–3 win. Samba set up two goals in the next two matches against Sunderland and West Bromwich Albion. Manager Kean felt that Samba has been treated unfairly by referees in a number of matches, due to his physical presence. On 31 December 2011, Samba was part of the squad that recorded a win against Manchester United, defeating Alex Ferguson's side at Old Trafford 2–3. A foul on Samba in the penalty area by Dimitar Berbatov resulted in Blackburn being awarded a penalty which Blackburn scored. By the time he left the club, Samba went on to make seventeen appearances and scoring two times in all competitions.

The following, Samba handed in a transfer request following a bid from Queens Park Rangers, which was rejected. On 14 January, Samba missed Blackburn's victory over Fulham, though manager Steve Kean attributed this to a stomach virus. On 17 January 2012, Blackburn turned down Samba's transfer request and issued a statement saying that the Rovers captain was not for sale. The player, himself, issued a statement the previous day, saying, "In my five years at Blackburn Rovers I have always given 100% in every game I have played. I have had several opportunities to leave but I have always stayed. I have decided now is the right time for me to pursue a new challenge and I have asked the club to respect my decision and allow me to leave. I thank the fans for their support and I hope they feel I have served them and their club well." Samba continued issuing a statement to leave the club, citing not "100 per cent for the club" anymore. As a result, he was dropped from the starting line–up and never played for the side again. By the time Samba left the club, he made 185 appearances and scoring 18 times in all competitions. Samba said about his departure, saying: "Blackburn is still in my heart; it was a big part of my life. I am sorry where they are now. It was very difficult, but then Steve Kean was doing quite well in the Championship and they sacked him. Now they have sacked Henning Berg. The main thing: I am sorry for the fans. We had a good identity together, and now they have lost a bit of that identity". Samba also credited both Manager Hughes and Allardyce as the two managers, who played a major role in his football career.

=== Anzhi Makhachkala ===
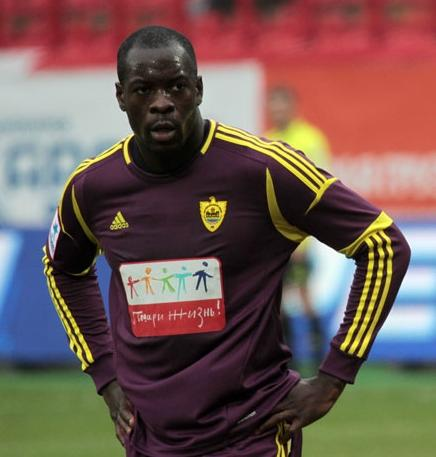
Samba pictured in his first spell at Anzhi Makhachkala in 2012.

On 24 February 2012, Samba completed a move to Russian club Anzhi Makhachkala on a four-year deal for an undisclosed fee thought to be in the region of £12.3 million, with a salary of £100,000 per week. Following his move to Russia, he was given the number 22 shirt. Upon joining the club, Samba said the move was unexpected, yet a new challenge in his career and a new experience.

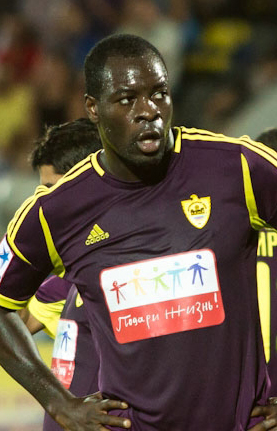
Samba playing for Anzhi Makhachkala in his second season.

Samba made his debut for Anzhi on 5 March 2012, with the team defeating Dynamo Moscow 1–0, therefore keeping a clean sheet. After the match, he was named Matchday 33’s Team of the Week. Since making his debut for the club, Samba quickly established himself in the starting eleven, forming a partnership with João Carlos. His performance earned him the club's Player of the Month for March. He scored his first goal for the team on 6 May 2012 in the 3–1 home win over Rubin Kazan in a Russian Premier League match. After the match, Samba was named Matchday 43’s Team of the Week. Despite missing two matches during the 2011–12 season, he went on to make ten appearances and scored once in all competitions.

At the start of the 2012–13 season, Samba helped the club keep six clean sheets and progress to the UEFA Europa League Group Stage after beating the teams of Budapest Honvéd, Vitesse and AZ Alkmaar. He also started the season as well in the league, assisting two goals in the first two league matches against Kuban Krasnodar and FC Rostov. On 2 September 2012, he scored his first goal of the season, in a 2–1 loss against Krylia Sovetov Samara. Samba continued to regain his first team place, playing in the centre–back position. Two months later on 4 November 2012, he scored his second goal of the season, in a 3–1 win against Terek Grozny. Three weeks later on 22 November 2012, Samba scored his third goal of the season, in a 2–0 win against Udinese to qualify for the UEFA Europa League Knockout Stage. However, during the match, he received a heavy blow to the head and was sidelined as a result. On 2 December 2012, Samba returned to the starting line–up and helped the side win 2–0 against CSKA Moscow. By the time he departed Anzhi Makhachkala in January, Samba went on to make twenty–nine appearances and scoring three times in all competitions.

==== First racism incident in Russia ====
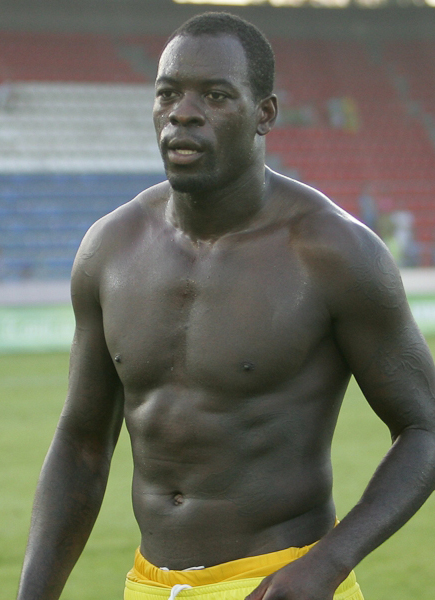
Samba pictured after the match while playing for Anzhi Makhachkala.

During a match between Anzhi and Lokomotiv Moscow on 17 March 2012, which Lokomotiv won 1–0, a crowd at Lokomotiv allegedly threw a banana at Samba after the match. In response, Samba threw the banana back into the crowd, which he expressed regret in doing. Samba spoke out saying that he was saddened by the incident happening close to children. "I am very sad that this happened in front of children who were sitting in the same stand," the Congo international told reporters after the game. "It is a really bad example for them." Following the incident, Anzhi issued a statement, describing the action of the banana throwing as "idiotic."

This banana incident thrown at Samba led Sergey Fursenko, the president of the Russian Football Union (RFS), to promise that the authorities were already investigating the incident to identify the person who threw the banana at Samba. Both clubs (Anzhi Makhachkala and Lokomotiv) issued a joint statement, vowing to find the fan who racially abused Samba and publicly punish him. However, Anzhi Makhachkala publicly criticised Lokomotiv's "interference" after the club claimed its fans did not throw a banana at Samba, with Anzhi's vice-president German Chistyakov saying, "It seems FC Lokomotiv is trying to interfere in the investigation... We are confident this is nothing but an absolute nonsense and foolishness." On 30 March 2012, the Russian Football Union confirmed the authorities had identified the thrower and that the thrower was a college student from Moscow.

Weeks after the incident, Samba vowed to stay at Anzhi despite the racism he experienced.

Samba said:

"I feel extremely passionately about racism in football and will never let the small community of racists break me, I'm a strong character and will keep fighting for my team. I am thoroughly enjoying my time in Russia and although I was of course angry at the racism incident, along with the rest of the football world, racist issues here are no different to what I have experienced in other countries.

Nine months after incident, Samba spoke out on racism, accusing Zenit Saint Petersburg supporters, specifically a small group of Zenit fans who are openly against homosexual or non-white players playing for Zenit, as racist and described their actions as "living in another century." But he later clarified the interview, regarding the club's supporters, saying: "I have no personal complaints against the fans of Zenit Saint Petersburg. Some groups of fans scare me. And not only this, but also other clubs that are negatively opposed to black players".

=== Queens Park Rangers ===
On 31 January 2013, Samba joined Queens Park Rangers for a reported fee of £12.5 million, signing a four-and-a-half-year deal. Following his transfer move, QPR manager Harry Redknapp commented that "Chris is just what we need. He's a monster. Great in the air, quick, a leader, strong, fantastic in both boxes, hard as nails. He's a proper centre-half. He was willing to take a massive pay cut."

Samba made his Queens Park Rangers debut, starting the whole game, in a 0–0 draw against Norwich City on 2 February 2013. Since making his debut for the club, he quickly established himself in the starting eleven, playing in the centre–back position. The club's poor results since joining Queens Park Rangers has led Samba commenting that he was ashamed over the defeats. During a 3–2 loss against Fulham on 1 April 2013, Samba was at fault when "he gave away the penalty for the opener, then getting robbed of possession to set up the second". After the match, he issued an apology to fans via his social media account. Despite expressing confidence of the relegation survival, Queens Park Rangers, however, was eventually relegated to the Championship following a 0–0 draw against Reading on 28 April 2013. Following this, Samba suffered an injury that kept him out for the rest of the 2012–13 season. Despite this, he went on to make ten appearances for the side.

=== Return to Anzhi ===
On 2 July 2013, Anzhi agreed a fee of £12 million to bring Samba back to Russia after only half a season with QPR following their relegation from the Premier League. Rangers were looking to cut their wage bill after dropping out of the English Premier Division, with Samba one of the highest earners on a reported £100,000 per week. The move was confirmed on 5 July 2013 as he signed a four–year contract with the club. Ironically, Samba said in an interview that he would never return to Russia.

Samba made his second debut for Anzhi Makhachkala in the opening game of the season, coming on as a late substitute, in a 2–2 draw against Lokomotiv Moscow. In a follow–up match, he scored his first goal in his second spell for the club, in a 2–1 loss against Dynamo Moscow. After a month at Anzhi Makhachkala, they chose to transfer list their whole squad, including Samba, himself, in a wake of the following financial restructuring. He announced his intention to leave the club as a result. Despite this, he made three more appearances, making a total of five by the time he departed Anzhi Makhachkala for the second time.

=== Dynamo Moscow ===
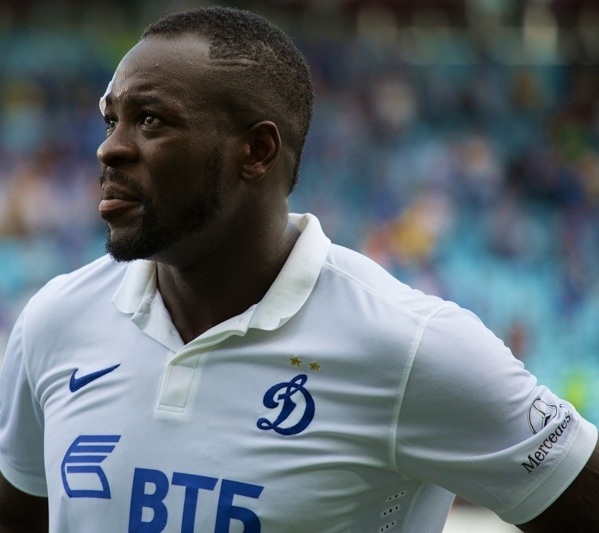
Samba playing for Dynamo Moscow in his second season.

On 29 August 2013, Dynamo Moscow signed three players from Anzhi, with Samba being one of them. He was issued the number 84 shirt. However, Samba's family were still based in England. For this reason, Samba was periodically linked with moves back to an English club.

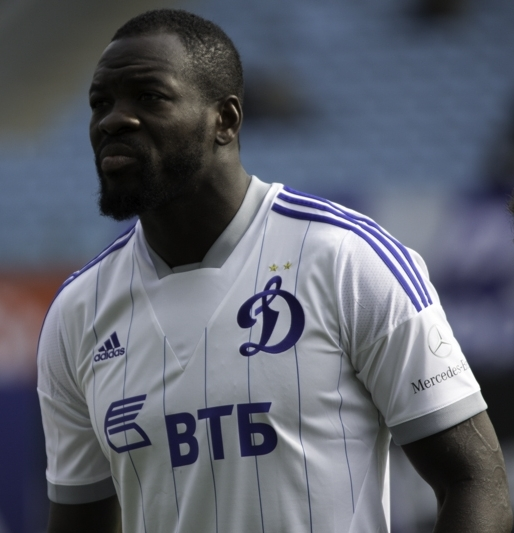
Samba pictured in his first season at Dynamo Moscow in away shirt.

Having spent two matches on the substitute bench, Samba made his FC Dynamo Moscow debut, coming on as a 76th-minute substitute, in a 3–1 loss against Lokomotiv Moscow on 21 September 2013. After making his debut, he acknowledged not being in shape as the reason on the substitute bench. Samba made his first start for the side, playing the whole game against Rubin Kazan five days later on 26 September 2013, but scored an own goal, in a 2–2 draw. However, his first team opportunities became limited and was placed on the substitute bench. After returning to full training from injury, he made his return to the starting line–up on 8 December 2013, in a 2–0 win against Amkar Perm. In a follow–up match against CSKA Moscow, Samba scored his first goal for the club, as Dynamo Moscow won 4–2. However, during the match, he suffered a concussion and was substituted in the 61st minute. After serving one match suspension, Samba returned to the starting line–up, starting the whole game, in a 0–0 draw against Rubin Kazan on 23 March 2014. He then scored his second goal of the season, in a 5–0 win against Volga Nizhny Novgorod on 14 April 2014. However, Samba missed the last three matches of the season, due to suspension and injury. At the end of the 2013–14 season, he went on to make eleven appearances and scoring two times in all competitions.

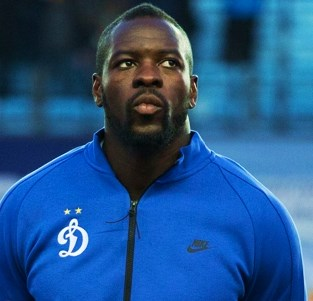
Samba pictured in the club's pre–match against PSV Eindhoven in the UEFA Europa League match.

At the start of the 2014–15 season, Samba started the season well when he scored the club's second goal of the game, in a 7–2 win against Rostov in the opening game of the season. Ten days later on 13 August 2013, Samba scored his second goal of the season, in a 2–0 win against Ufa. He then scored in both legs against Omonia in the UEFA Europa League Play–Offs, resulting a 4–3 win on aggregate to progress to the group stage. He continued to regain his first team place, playing in the centre–back position. Samba scored his fifth goal of the season, in a 3–2 loss against Zenit Saint Petersburg on 13 September 2014. However, during a 3–2 win against Torpedo Moscow on 22 September 2014, he was subjected to racist taunts from the opposition team, leading him to show an "unpleasant gesture"' to Torpedo fans. Although the club had to close a section of their stadium for their next match after being sanctioned by Russian Football Union (RFU), Samba, himself, was banned for two match for show an "unpleasant gesture"' to Torpedo fans. Following this, he apologised to the supporters of Torpedo Moscow for his action. After serving a two match suspension, Samba returned to the starting line–up, starting the whole game, in a 2–2 draw against Lokomotiv Moscow on 2 November 2014. He captained Dynamo Moscow for the first time and helped the side draw 1–1 against Rubin Kazan on 30 November 2014. On 26 April 2015, Samba scored his sixth goal of the season, in a 2–2 draw against Rostov. Despite missing two matches later in the 2014–15 season, he went on to make thirty–seven appearances and scoring six times in all competitions.

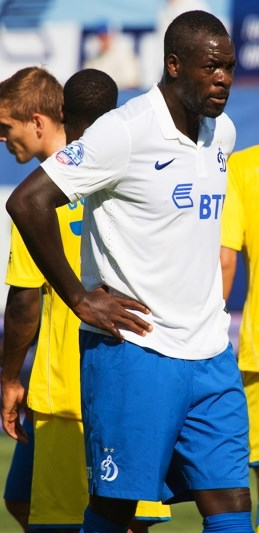
Samba pictured during a match against Rostov in the opening game of the 2014–15 season.

In June 2015, Dynamo Moscow were excluded from 2015–16 Europa League contention for violating Financial Fair Play break-even requirements. Samba reacted angrily with the respond in a Russian interview. Consequently, most of the foreign players left the club. In August, Samba went to Turkey to arrange a transfer to Trabzonspor, but the transfer fell through, with Trabzonspor manager Shota Arveladze commenting: "This is not the Samba I know, this is some kind of Mike Tyson. I need a football player, not a heavyweight boxer." He rejected a new contract from Dynamo Moscow, which began negotiation last April. Samba didn't play any games for Dynamo in the first half of the 2015–16 season, with his spot in the line–up taken by a new signing Vitali Dyakov. Dynamo manager Andrey Kobelev explained that Samba is suffering from a herniated disc in his neck and he required a surgery to correct it. After the surgery, his recovery took most of the rest of the 2015–16 season. He previously suffered a foot injury during a friendly match against AFC Ajax. He returned to action for Dynamo in a game against PFC CSKA Moscow on 24 April 2016. Samba later made three starts for the side, adding his 2015–16 appearance to four. However, his return was short–lived when he suffered another injury and was sidelined for the rest of the 2015–16 season.

His Dynamo contract expired at the end of the 2015–16 season and was not extended. He previously hinted about not renewing his contract with the club.

=== Panathinaikos ===
On 31 August 2016, in the last day of the pre-season summer transfer window, Panathinaikos officially announced the capture of Samba who signed a one-season contract with the Greens. Upon joining the club, he said the move was a challenge and was hungry for football.

Samba made his Panathinaikos debut on 15 September 2016 against Ajax, coming on as a 73rd-minute substitute, in a 2–1 loss. Three days later on 18 September 2016, he made his league debut, starting the whole game, in a 4–0 win against PAS Giannina. On 20 January 2017, Samba's contract was dissolved by mutual consent despite joining the club over the summer, as he has been hit with injuries since the start of the 2016–17 season.

=== Aston Villa ===
On 21 February 2017, it was announced that after an unsuccessful trial at Crystal Palace, Samba was training at Aston Villa. On 6 March 2017, he played for Aston Villa Under-23s against Wolverhampton Wanderers U23. Samba joined Aston Villa for a pre-season training camp in Portugal prior to the start of the 2017–18 season. On 20 July 2017, he signed for the club on a one-year contract.

Samba made his Aston Villa debut, coming on as a late substitute, in a 1–1 draw against Hull City in the opening game of the season. He then made his first start for the side, starting the whole game, in a 2–1 win against Colchester United in the first round of the League Cup. Samba played 45 minutes before being substituted at half time, as Aston Villa drew 1–1 against Bristol City on 25 August 2017. Following this, he found his first team opportunities limited and was placed on the substitute bench. On 4 November 2017, he scored his first goal for the club in a 2–1 defeat to Sheffield Wednesday at Villa Park. Following this, Samba spent the next five months, recovering from his injury. On 10 April 2018, he made his return to the first team, coming on as a late substitute, in a 1–0 win against Cardiff City. At the end of the 2017–18 season, Samba went on to make fourteen appearances and scoring once in all competitions.

It was announced on 23 June 2018 that Aston Villa had released Samba. After spending a year without a club, Samba began studying to gain a coaching badge at the Irish Football Association. As a result, he quietly announced his retirement from football.

== International career ==
Samba represented the Republic of the Congo national team and stated in an interview, saying: "Without them, I don't know where I would be today. Many people ask me why I do not have French nationality to have a chance to play with the France team. But it was the Congo team that gave me the opportunity to play soccer again when I needed it." He made his Congo debut as a 20-year-old on 5 September 2004 against Togo and played 61 minutes before being substituted, as the side lost 2–0. Samba made his second appearance for Congo a month later on 10 October 2004 against Zambia and played 45 minutes, as they lost 3–2.

Following his move to Blackburn Rovers, Samba hoped the move would benefited him in order to earn a call–up from Congo. However, he only made five appearances for the national side and didn't get a call up until February 2012, his first time called up in five years. A year later on 23 March 2013, Samba scored his first international goal, in a 1–0 win against Gabon.

In November 2014, Samba announced his intention not to play in Africa Cup of Nations in Equatorial Guinea, citing his commitment to Dynamo Moscow. In November 2016, Samba was called up to the Congo squad for the first time in two years but never made the final cut.

== Coaching career ==
On 25 November 2021, Blackburn Rovers announced that Samba had returned to the club as an academy coach.

== Personal life ==
Samba was born in Créteil, France and raised by a large family with seven siblings. Growing up, Samba idolised Lilian Thuram and even wish to emulate him.

Samba has 6 children. The family continued to reside in England. In November 2013, Samba became a father for the third time when his daughter was born. Two of his sons, Tyrone and Floyd, play in the Manchester City Academy.

In August 2006, he had his wisdom tooth removed, which caused him to miss Hertha BSC's pre–season friendly matches. In August 2010, Samba was fined £120 after being caught speeding at 46 mph in a 30 mph zone in his Rolls-Royce in Lancashire. In April 2012, he was fined once again after caught speeding at more than 130 mph on the M65. Samba reflected on his actions when asked in an interview, responding: "As for the first part of the question, I know. As for the second - yes, exactly once. Then the policeman stopped for speeding. Never again violated the law. I prefer to remain a law-abiding citizen."

In addition to speaking French, Samba speaks English and German, though he can speak Russian sometimes. However, Samba later stated in a Russian interview that he had difficulties speaking Russian, due to the difference between the Russian and Latin scripts. In January 2013, Samba revealed in an interview with the Guardian that he planned to establish a foundation named after him to create a football school in Congo. Outside of football, Samba said he plays basketball as his hobby.

== Career statistics ==
Appearances and goals by club, season and competition
Club	Season	League			National cup		League cup		Other		Total	
Club	Season	Division	Apps	Goals	Apps	Goals	Apps	Goals	Apps	Goals	Apps	Goals
Hertha Berlin II	2005–06	Regionalliga Nordost	12	1	0	0	—		0	0	12	1
Hertha Berlin II	2006–07	Regionalliga Nordost	2	0	0	0	—		0	0	2	0
Hertha Berlin II	Total		14	1	0	0	—		0	0	14	1
Hertha Berlin	2005–06	Bundesliga	12	0	0	0	—		0	0	12	0
Hertha Berlin	2006–07	Bundesliga	7	0	0	0	—		0	0	7	0
Hertha Berlin	Total		19	0	0	0	—		0	0	19	0
Blackburn Rovers	2006–07	Premier League	14	2	5	0	0	0	0	0	19	2
Blackburn Rovers	2007–08	Premier League	33	2	1	0	3	0	4 (Note: Appearances in the UEFA Cup and UEFA Intertoto Cup)	1	41	3
Blackburn Rovers	2008–09	Premier League	35	2	3	1	1	0	0	0	39	3
Blackburn Rovers	2009–10	Premier League	30	4	0	0	3	0	0	0	33	4
Blackburn Rovers	2010–11	Premier League	33	4	1	0	2	0	0	0	36	4
Blackburn Rovers	2011–12	Premier League	16	2	0	0	1	0	0	0	17	2
Blackburn Rovers	Total		161	16	10	1	10	0	4	1	185	18
Anzhi Makhachkala	2011–12	Russian Premier League	10	1	0	0	—		0	0	10	1
Anzhi Makhachkala	2012–13	Russian Premier League	17	2	0	0	—		12 (Note: Appearances in UEFA Europa League)	1	29	3
Anzhi Makhachkala	Total		27	3	0	0	—		12	1	39	4
Queens Park Rangers	2012–13	Premier League	10	0	0	0	0	0	0	0	10	0
Anzhi Makhachkala	2013–14	Russian Premier League	5	1	0	0	—		0	0	5	1
Dynamo Moscow	2013–14	Russian Premier League	10	2	1	0	—		0	0	11	2
Dynamo Moscow	2014–15	Russian Premier League	24	4	0	0	—		13	2	37	6
Dynamo Moscow	2015–16	Russian Premier League	4	0	0	0	—		0	0	4	0
Dynamo Moscow	Total		38	6	1	0	—		13	2	52	8
Panathinaikos	2016–17	Super League Greece	2	0	0	0	—		4	0	6	0
Aston Villa	2017–18	Championship	12	1	0	0	2	0	0	0	14	1
Career total			288	28	11	1	12	0	33	4	344	33
