= David Bentley =

English footballer (born 1984)

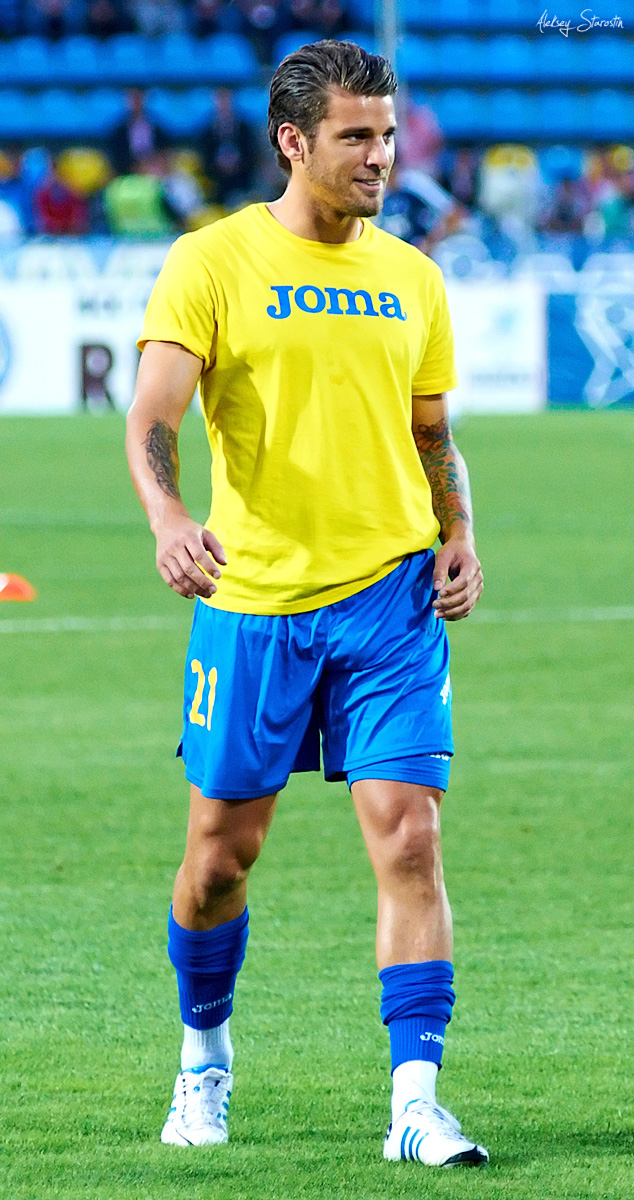
- Bentley training with Rostov in 2012

Personal information
- Full name: David Michael Bentley
- Date of birth: 27 August 1984 (age 42)
- Place of birth: Peterborough, Cambridgeshire, England
- Height: 5 ft 9 in (1.75 m)
- Position: Winger

Youth career
- –1997: Wormley Rovers
- 1997–2001: Arsenal

Senior career*
Years	Team	Apps	(Gls)
2001–2006	Arsenal	1	(0)
2004–2005	→ Norwich City (loan)	26	(2)
2005–2006	→ Blackburn Rovers (loan)	14	(0)
2006–2008	Blackburn Rovers	88	(13)
2008–2013	Tottenham Hotspur	42	(2)
2011	→ Birmingham City (loan)	13	(0)
2011	→ West Ham United (loan)	5	(0)
2012–2013	→ Rostov (loan)	7	(0)
2013	→ Blackburn Rovers (loan)	5	(0)
Total		201	(17)

International career
2000–2001	England U16	4	(0)
2002	England U18	3	(0)
2002–2003	England U19	6	(0)
2003	England U20	1	(0)
2004–2007	England U21	8	(4)
2007	England B	1	(0)
2007–2008	England	7	(0)
- * Club domestic league appearances and goals

David Michael Bentley (born 27 August 1984) is an English former professional footballer who played primarily as a winger, but also played as a central midfielder or as a second striker.

Bentley started his career with Arsenal in the Premier League, and despite being earmarked as one for the future, saw his playing opportunities limited by a strong senior squad. He spent two seasons on loan with Norwich City and Blackburn Rovers, and sealed a permanent transfer to Rovers in January 2006. Bentley produced strong performances for his new club, and soon featured regularly for the England under-21 team. He made his senior international debut against Israel in September 2007. In July 2008, Bentley joined Tottenham Hotspur. He spent time on loan with Birmingham City, West Ham United, Rostov and a brief return to Blackburn before being released by Tottenham in 2013. After not playing for more than a year, Bentley retired from football in 2014, citing his loss of passion for the sport.

== Club career ==
=== Arsenal ===
Born in Peterborough, Cambridgeshire, Bentley grew up supporting Manchester United. Bentley started his youth career at Wormley Youth Football Club in Wormley, Hertfordshire, before moving to Arsenal aged 13 as a striker, occasionally playing in the hole. He was used primarily in midfield, usually as a wide midfielder. As a 16-year-old he trained with the Arsenal senior squad, before signing his first professional contract in September 2001. By January 2003, he was handed his first-team debut, coming on as a substitute for Kolo Touré in the 77th minute of a 2–0 FA Cup third round win over Oxford United. Bentley's first and only goal for Arsenal was a chip shot from the edge of the penalty area over goalkeeper Mark Schwarzer, in a 4–1 FA Cup win over Middlesbrough on 24 January 2004. He played once in the league for Arsenal, starting a 1–1 draw against Portsmouth on 4 May 2004, in which he was substituted after 61 minutes for Nwankwo Kanu.

Bentley spent the whole of the next league season on loan to Norwich City, playing 26 league matches and scoring two goals, against Newcastle and Southampton. His season at Carrow Road was interrupted by a knee injury sustained in January. He returned to the team in April 2005, coming off the bench against Manchester United and playing a key role in Norwich's 2–0 win. Despite a late run of form, the Canaries were relegated from the Premier League on the last day of the season after a 6–0 defeat away to Fulham. Bentley returned to Arsenal in the summer of 2005, but submitted a transfer request, citing his desire for first team football. In subsequent interviews, he also revealed that he was having "personal problems" at that point in his career and had lost his enjoyment for football—problems which he overcame later in his Blackburn Rovers career. He admitted to gambling addiction in the early stages of his career, reaching a peak of placing 100 bets a day. He got over his problems in 2005.

Desiring a permanent move, Bentley was linked with a number of clubs including Wolverhampton Wanderers, before returning on a further season's loan, to Blackburn Rovers on 31 August 2005.

=== Blackburn Rovers ===
In January 2006, Blackburn signed Bentley on a permanent basis from Arsenal. In his first match after permanently signing for Blackburn, he scored his first senior hat-trick in a 4–3 victory against Manchester United. Bentley went on to feature regularly for Blackburn in the 2005–06 season, and helped the club finish sixth in league standings and qualify for the 2006–07 UEFA Cup.

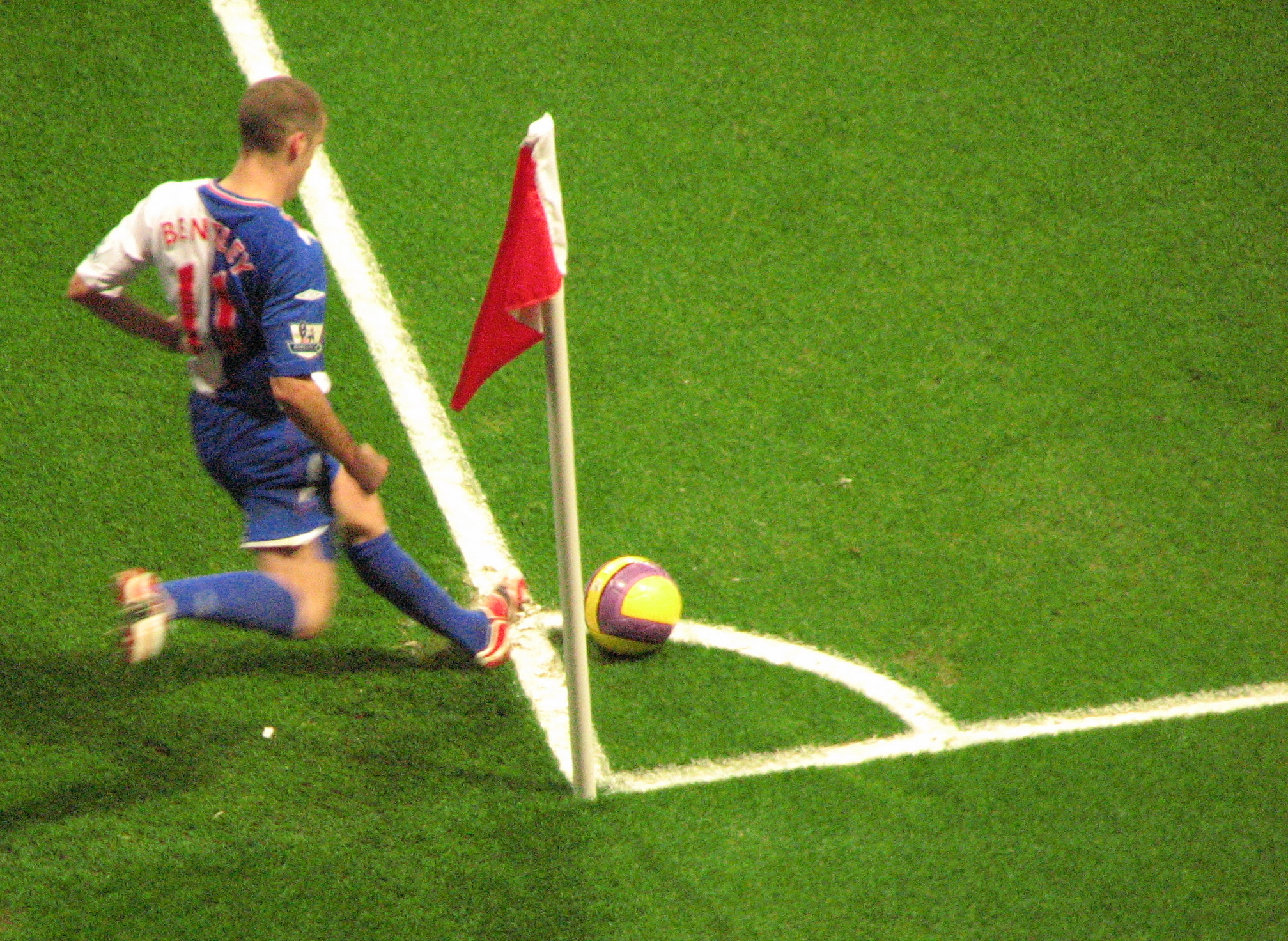
Bentley playing for Blackburn Rovers in 2008

The 2006–07 season saw Bentley become more of a regular goalscorer for Rovers, including some stunning strikes in the Premier League. In Europe, a 25-yard volley against Salzburg in the UEFA Cup helped secure Rovers' passage into the group stage, where he also scored a last minute winner against Wisła Kraków. Bentley's club performances attracted much transfer speculation. However, on 27 February 2007, despite being linked to a move to Manchester United, he agreed to a new contract that would keep him with Blackburn until 2011. Commenting on the new deal, Rovers manager Mark Hughes described Bentley as "a great talent with a big future" while chairman John Williams added that he "is widely regarded as one of the best young footballers in the country." Bentley ended the season with seven goals and 13 assists for Blackburn, the latter statistic also highlighting his creative importance to the team. He was later voted by Rovers fans as the club's Player of the Year.

Bentley recorded similar statistics in the following season, scoring eight goals and providing 13 assists. Blackburn finished seventh in the Premier League, but did not qualify for European competition. Bentley's consistent performances for his club, however, ensured that he played in a series of post-season friendlies for England. But that was to be the Englishman's final season with the Lancashire club. Not long after the departure of manager Mark Hughes to Manchester City, Bentley reiterated his desire to leave. Blackburn placed a valuation of the player at around £18 million.

=== Tottenham Hotspur ===
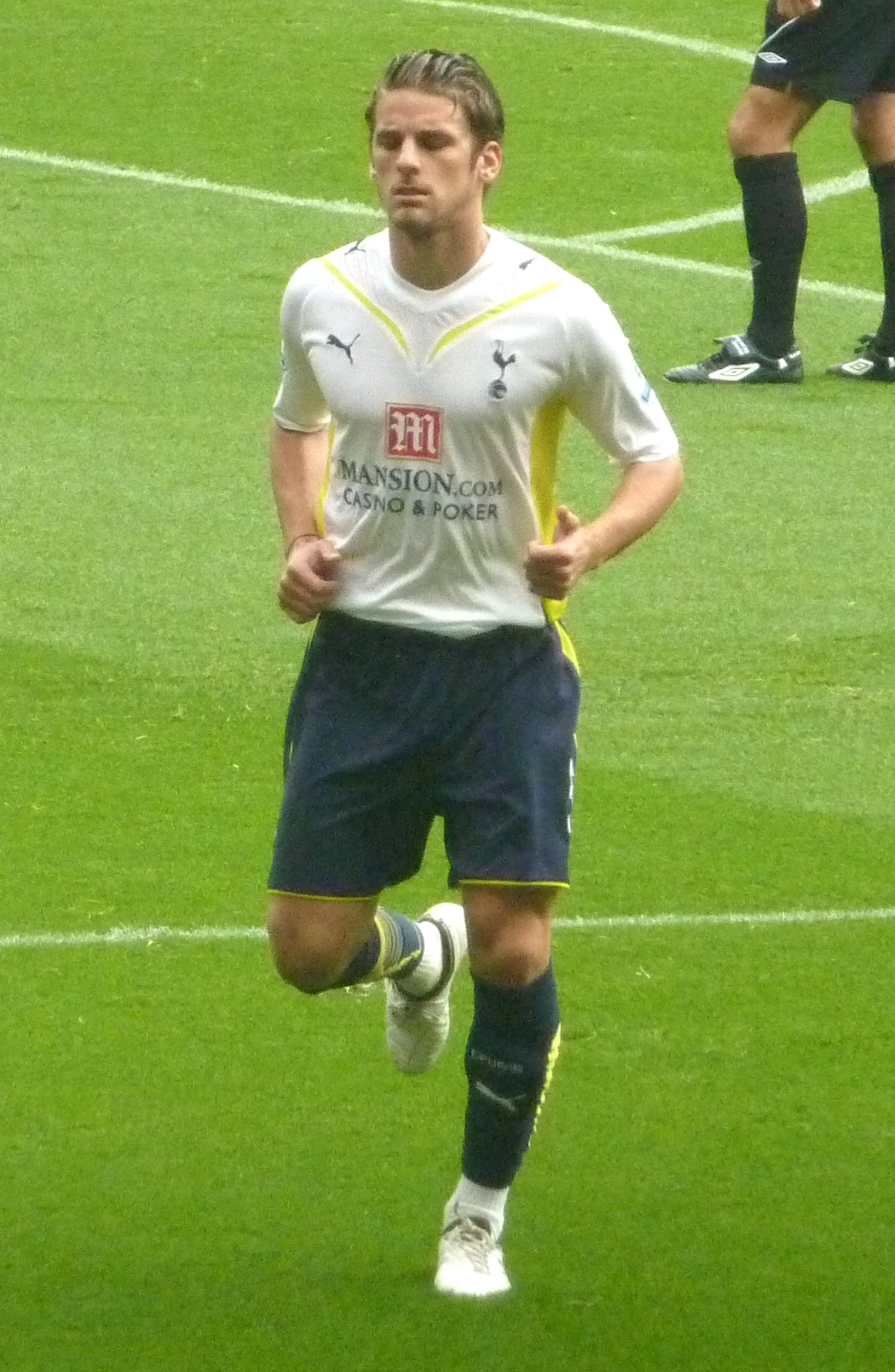
Bentley playing for Tottenham Hotspur in 2009

On 31 July 2008, Tottenham Hotspur announced their signing of Bentley, on a six-year contract, for a £15 million fee, with an additional £2 million conditional on future performance. Reports suggested that £7 million of this fee was payable to Bentley's former employers, Arsenal. Bentley made his competitive debut on 16 August 2008 away at Middlesbrough where Spurs lost 2–1. He scored his first competitive goal for Spurs in the 2008–09 UEFA Cup first round tie against Wisła Kraków on 18 September 2008. He then scored his first league goal for Tottenham against his old club Arsenal with a 43-yard dipping volley in a 4–4 draw on 29 October 2008. This led the British mathematician Tony Mann to ask Marcus du Sautoy to name a symmetry group in honour of David Bentley; the group is labelled Set [C[1], C[2], C[3], C[4]]=[40, 13, 4, 4], with the final two digits corresponding to the result of the match. Bentley's form would suffer at Tottenham, however, and after falling down the pecking order for both club and country, it was reported on 17 June 2009 that he was in talks to move to Aston Villa. Subsequently, it was revealed by Bentley and Aston Villa that this was untrue.

The form of Aaron Lennon meant that Bentley was mostly used as a substitute for the start 2009–10 season, although he did score a free kick in Tottenham's 9–1 victory over Wigan Athletic, with the ball then going in off the back of Wigan goalkeeper Chris Kirkland.

==== Loan spells ====
On 12 January 2011, Bentley joined Birmingham City on loan for the remainder of the season. He went straight into the starting eleven for the Second City derby against Aston Villa and was named man of the match. Bentley scored his first goal for Birmingham in a 3–2 win against Coventry City in the fourth round of the 2010–11 FA Cup. Bentley was cup-tied for Birmingham's victory in the 2011 League Cup Final. Described in the Birmingham Mail's season review as having "flattered to deceive", he failed to establish himself in the first team, and returned to Tottenham at the end of the season.

On 31 August 2011, Bentley signed a season-long loan deal with Championship club West Ham United. He made his debut on 10 September 2011 in a 4–3 home win against Portsmouth coming on in the 63rd minute for Julien Faubert. In October 2011, he was ruled out for six months following a knee operation and returned to Tottenham for treatment, after playing five matches for West Ham. In February 2012, Bentley was named in Tottenham's 25-man squad for the second half of the 2011–12 season despite his injury.

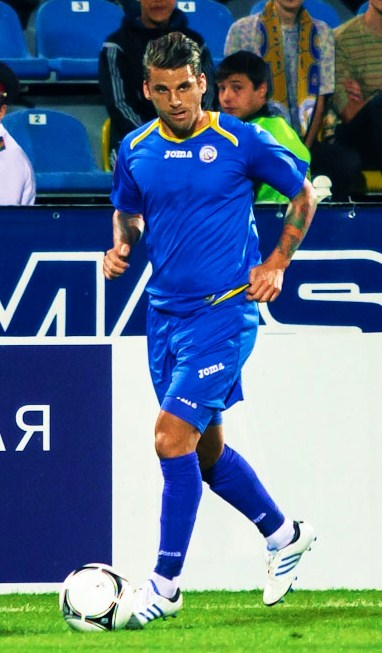
Bentley playing for FC Rostov in 2012

Despite featuring prominently in Tottenham's pre-season under new manager André Villas-Boas, on 7 September 2012, Bentley went out on loan to Russian club Rostov. Bentley became the first Englishman to play in the Russian Premier League when he made his debut for the club on 15 September, playing the full 90 minutes in a 1–0 victory over Dynamo Moscow. He went on to start all four subsequent league matches for Rostov before picking up an ankle injury in the 0–0 draw with Lokomotiv Moscow on 21 October. Bentley made seven appearances for Rostov without scoring.

==== Loan return to Blackburn Rovers ====
In January 2013, Bentley's former manager at Tottenham, Harry Redknapp, attempted to sign him on loan for Queens Park Rangers as a potential supplier of crosses for Peter Crouch. However, the move did not take place because Crouch did not sign for QPR and Bentley's weekly wage of £50,000 was deemed too high. On 15 February, Bentley returned to former club Blackburn Rovers on a 93-day loan. He made his second Blackburn début the next day, coming on as substitute in a fifth round FA Cup away win at Arsenal.

On 7 June 2013, the Premier League confirmed that he had been released by Tottenham Hotspur. On 3 August 2013, Levski Sofia manager Slaviša Jokanović expressed interest in signing Bentley and his former Tottenham teammate Cristian Ceballos.

==== Retirement ====
On 13 June 2014, Bentley announced his retirement from professional football at the age of 29, having been without a club for over a year. He stated in an interview that he had fallen out of love with football, calling the modern game "robotic" due to the influence of social media and money, as well as "predictable and a bit too calculated". He said that he wished to spend time with his three children. By October 2014, Bentley was a co-owner of a restaurant in Marbella, Spain, where he and his family had moved to. Bentley has also invested in beach clubs and a restaurant in Woodford Green, London with Raheem Sterling and Alex Oxlade-Chamberlain.

In 2015, as part of a job-swap documentary for Irish television, Bentley trained for and played in a Gaelic football match for Crossmaglen Rangers; in return, Aaron Kernan was to train with Sunderland.

== International career ==
Bentley played for the England under-15 and under-16 teams, captained the England under-18 team and played for the England under-21 team. He recorded eight caps and four goals with the under-21 team, He was the first Englishman to score at the new Wembley Stadium in a match against the Italy under-21 team on 24 March 2007.

In May 2007, following an impressive 2006–07 season for Blackburn, Bentley was called up for the England B international at Turf Moor for a match against Albania. After naming him as a starter, England manager Steve McClaren said Bentley had the potential to become England's "new David Beckham". In that match, Bentley provided the cross for Stewart Downing's first goal and was involved in the buildup to Downing's second in the 3–1 victory for England. He received the man of the match award for his performance. The next day, he was named in McClaren's 26-man full England squad for the friendly match against Brazil and the UEFA Euro 2008 qualifier against Estonia.

In June 2007, Bentley was called up to the England under-21 squad for the 2007 UEFA European Under-21 Championship in the Netherlands. However, he pulled out of the squad citing fatigue, and England under-21 manager Stuart Pearce questioned the midfielder's commitment to the national squad. This withdrawal led to Bentley being excluded from the senior England squad for the friendly against Germany, but he was selected for the UEFA Euro 2008 qualifiers against Israel and Russia. He made his senior debut when he came on as a substitute for Shaun Wright-Phillips against Israel, but was jeered by some of the fans due to his previous refusal to play for the under-21 team. Bentley has since revealed that he was instructed by Blackburn to make himself unavailable due to having just completed a full season with Domestic, European and International appearances, as well as a July start to the 2007–08 season for the UEFA Intertoto Cup.

Bentley started for England for the first time in the friendly against Switzerland on 6 February 2008.

== Style of play ==
Most often Bentley played as a right winger, but he could also play as a central midfielder or a second striker. When at Arsenal, Bentley was stated to play in the second striker role.

== Career statistics ==
=== Club ===
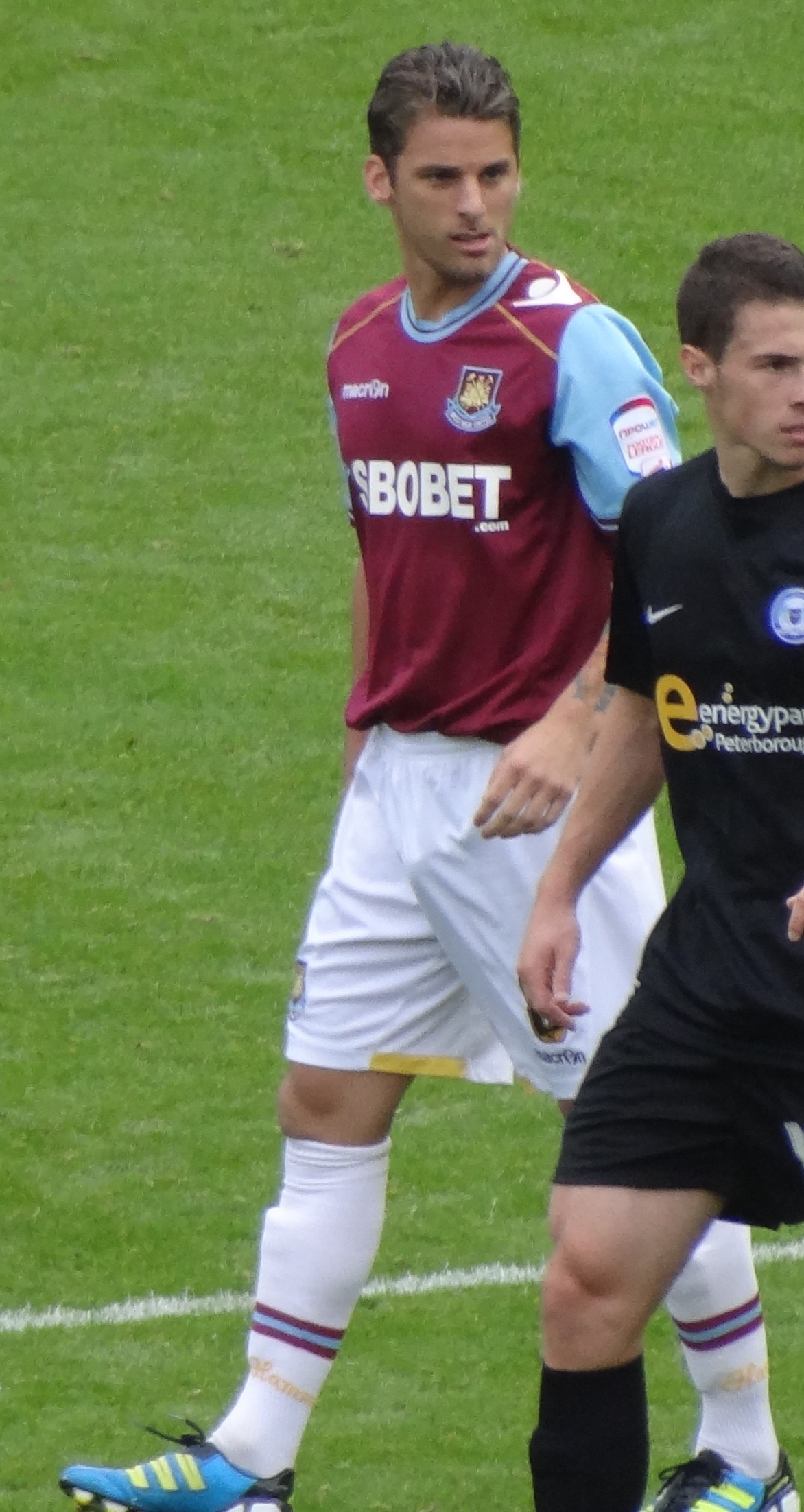
Bentley playing for West Ham United in 2011

Appearances and goals by club, season and competition
Club	Season	League			National cup (Note: Includes FA Cup, Russian Cup)		League cup (Note: Includes Football League Cup)		Europe		Total	
Club	Season	Division	Apps	Goals	Apps	Goals	Apps	Goals	Apps	Goals	Apps	Goals
Arsenal	2002–03	Premier League	0	0	1	0	0	0	0	0	1	0
Arsenal	2003–04	Premier League	1	0	2	1	4	0	1 (Note: Appearance in UEFA Champions League)	0	8	1
Arsenal	2005–06	Premier League	0	0	—		—		0	0	0	0
Arsenal	Total		1	0	3	1	4	0	1	0	9	1
Norwich City (loan)	2004–05	Premier League	26	2	1	0	1	0	—		28	2
Blackburn Rovers	2005–06	Premier League	29	3	1	1	5	1	—		35	5
Blackburn Rovers	2006–07	Premier League	36	4	6	0	1	0	8 (Note: Appearances in UEFA Cup)	3	51	7
Blackburn Rovers	2007–08	Premier League	37	6	1	1	3	1	6 (Note: Two appearances in UEFA Intertoto Cup, four appearances and one goal in UEFA Cup)	1	47	9
Blackburn Rovers	Total		102	13	8	2	9	2	14	4	133	21
Tottenham Hotspur	2008–09	Premier League	25	1	2	0	3	0	5	1	35	2
Tottenham Hotspur	2009–10	Premier League	15	1	5	1	4	1	—		24	3
Tottenham Hotspur	2010–11	Premier League	2	0	0	0	1	0	0	0	3	0
Tottenham Hotspur	2011–12	Premier League	0	0	—		0	0	0	0	0	0
Tottenham Hotspur	2012–13	Premier League	0	0	0	0	—		0	0	0	0
Tottenham Hotspur	Total		42	2	7	1	8	1	5	1	62	5
Birmingham City (loan)	2010–11	Premier League	13	0	2	1	—		—		15	1
West Ham United (loan)	2011–12	Championship	5	0	—		—		—		5	0
FC Rostov (loan)	2012–13	Russian Premier League	7	0	1	0	—		—		8	0
Blackburn Rovers (loan)	2012–13	Championship	5	0	2	0	—		—		7	0
Career total			201	17	24	5	22	3	20	5	267	30

=== International ===
Appearances and goals by national team and year
National team	Year	Apps	Goals
England	2007	2	0
England	2008	5	0
Total		7	0

== Honours ==
Tottenham Hotspur

- Football League Cup runner-up: 2008–09

Individual

- Blackburn Rovers Player of the Year: 2006–07
