= Zurab Khizanishvili =

Georgian football coach (born 1981)

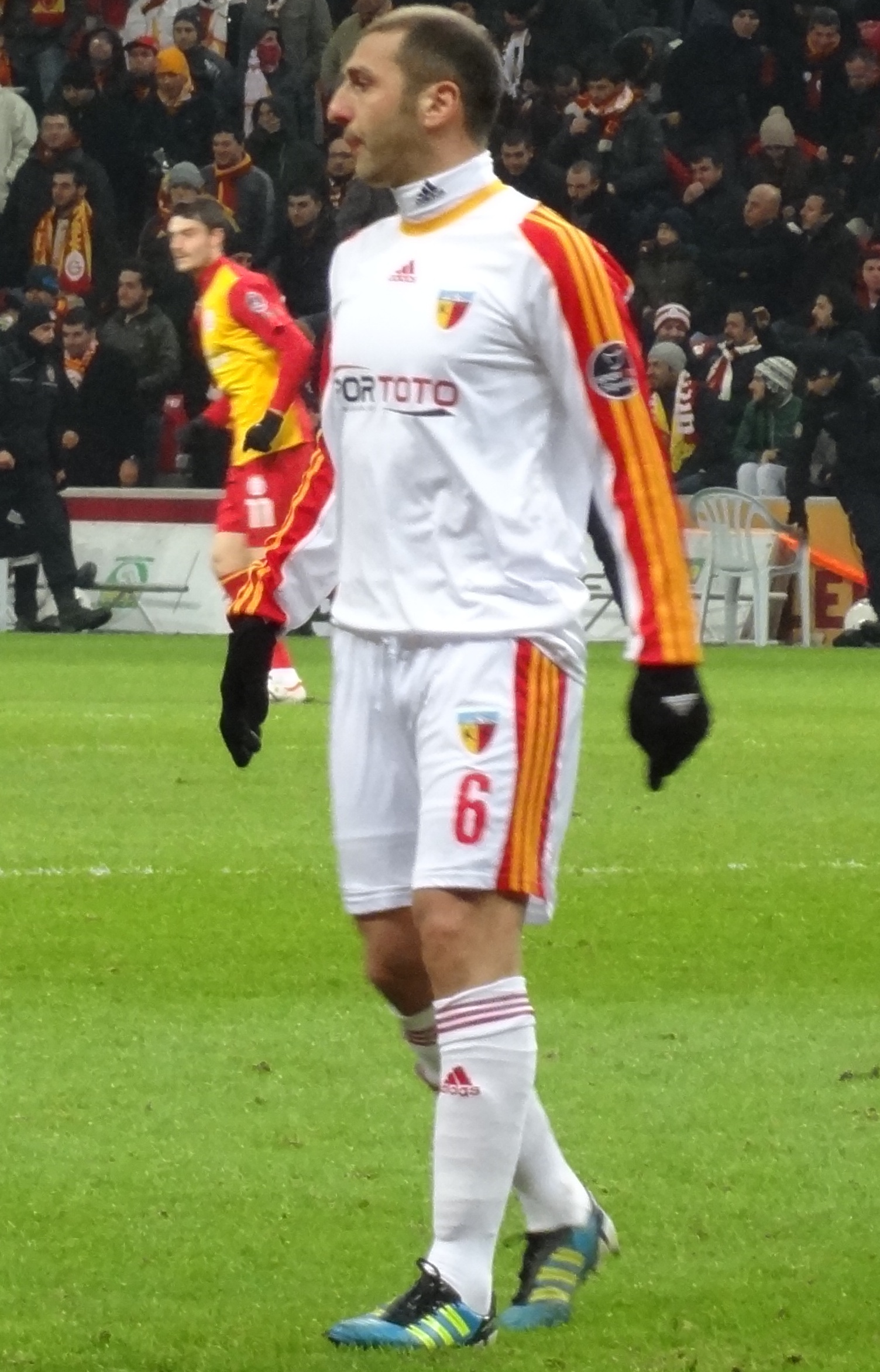
- Khizanishvili with Kayserispor in 2012

Personal information
- Full name: Zurab Khizanishvili
- Date of birth: 6 October 1981 (age 45)
- Place of birth: Tbilisi, Georgia SSR, Soviet Union
- Height: 6 ft 1 in (1.85 m)
- Position: Defender

Team information
- Current team: Georgia U-21 (assistant)

Senior career*
Years	Team	Apps	(Gls)
1998–1999	Dinamo Tbilisi	2	(1)
1999–2000	Norchi Tbilisi	9	(0)
2000–2001	Lokomotiv Tbilisi	16	(1)
2001–2003	Dundee	43	(0)
2003–2006	Rangers	42	(0)
2005–2006	→ Blackburn Rovers (loan)	26	(1)
2006–2011	Blackburn Rovers	36	(0)
2009	→ Newcastle United (loan)	7	(0)
2010	→ Reading (loan)	15	(0)
2010–2011	→ Reading (loan)	22	(0)
2011–2014	Kayserispor	71	(1)
2014	Dinamo Tbilisi	4	(0)
2015	Samtredia	14	(1)
2015–2017	Inter Baku	50	(6)
Total		357	(11)

International career
1996–1997	Georgia U17	9	(1)
1998	Georgia U19	8	(0)
1999–2000	Georgia U21	3	(1)
1999–2015	Georgia	92	(1)

Managerial career
- 2017–2020: Georgia U21 (assistant)
- 2021–: Georgia (assistant)
- * Club domestic league appearances and goals

Zurab Khizanishvili (Georgian: ზურაბ ხიზანიშვილი; born 6 October 1981) is a Georgian football coach and former player who is currently the assistant manager of the Georgia U21 football team.

== Club career ==
=== Early career ===
Khizanishvili started his career at Dinamo Tbilisi where he remained for just one season, before joining FC Tbilisi to improve his chances of playing regular first team football.

In 1999, he was on the move again, joining his previous two clubs' city rivals Lokomotiv Tbilisi. Khizanishvili's form at Lokomotiv piqued the interest of some of Europe's top clubs, though the player's latter days at the club were marred by injury. Khizanishvili was eventually released after his contract with Lokomotiv was terminated.

=== Scotland ===
In March 2001, Khizanishvili joined Dundee, having had unsuccessful trials at Arsenal, Fulham and West Ham United.

He quickly made an impact at Dens Park, alerting fellow Scottish Premier League team Rangers, whom Khizanishvili joined on a Bosman transfer in July 2003 as a replacement for Blackburn Rovers-bound defender Lorenzo Amoruso.

=== England ===
Despite making 35 appearances in his first campaign at Ibrox, Khizanishvili gradually fell out of favour and, on 31 August 2005, he was allowed to move on loan for the rest of the season to Blackburn in the English FA Premier League. During his loan spell at Blackburn he scored once in the league, in a 2–0 home win over Manchester City, and once in the League Cup in a 3–1 win over Huddersfield Town.

On 10 April 2006, he signed a permanent deal with Blackburn Rovers in a deal rumoured to be worth around about £500,000. He was a key part of Blackburn's team in the 2006-07 season, starting more than half the matches as the club competed domestically and in the UEFA Cup. Khizanishvili struggled to hold down a regular starting position in the rest of Mark Hughes' reign as manager.

Under Paul Ince and Sam Allardyce he also failed to break into the first team on a consistent basis. His first appearance of the 2009–10 campaign came on 25 August, when he started the League Cup 2nd Round tie against Gillingham at Priestfield Stadium, playing the full 90 minutes alongside Gael Givet in a 3–1 win. On 17 September 2009 Khizanishvili joined Championship team Newcastle United on loan in a three-month deal and returned on 19 December. On 25 January 2010, he signed for Reading on loan for the remainder of the 2009–10 season.

On 31 August 2010, he rejoined Reading on a season long loan for the 2010–11 season and was handed the number 15 shirt at the Madejski Stadium. On 13 March 2011, Khizanishvili completed the full 90 minutes against Manchester City at Eastlands in a 1–0 FA Cup quarter-final loss. On 30 May 2011, he started the Championship play-off final against Swansea City. Khizanishvili was booked after 12 minutes and then conceded a penalty kick after 20 minutes, due to a clumsy challenge on winger Nathan Dyer and Reading went on to lose 4–2. Khizanishvili ended his second loan spell with Reading having made 29 appearances in all competitions, including 24 league outings.

=== Turkey ===
After his release from Blackburn, Khizanishvili joined Kayserispor, where he played for three seasons.

=== Azerbaijan ===
In June 2015, Khizanishvili signed a six-month contract with Azerbaijan Premier League side Inter Baku PIK.

== International career ==
Khizanishvili played 93 matches for Georgia national team. He scored his only goal against Moldova on 6 June 2009.

== Coaching career ==
After he retired from football in the summer 2017, Khizanishvili was appointed as the assistant manager of Gia Geguchadze at the Georgian U-21 national team.

== Personal life ==
Khizanishvili is married to the Georgian model Salome Ghviniashvili and they have three children. He is the son of former USSR international defender Nodar Khizanishvili.

== Career statistics ==
=== Club ===
Appearances and goals by club, season and competition
Club	Season	League			National cup		League cup		Continental		Other		Total	
Club	Season	Division	Apps	Goals	Apps	Goals	Apps	Goals	Apps	Goals	Apps	Goals	Apps	Goals
Dinamo Tbilisi	1998–99	Umaglesi Liga	2	1			–		0	0	–		2	1
FC Tbilisi	1999–2000	Umaglesi Liga	9	0			–		–		–		9	0
Locomotive Tbilisi	1999–2000	Umaglesi Liga	5	1			–		0	0	–		5	1
Locomotive Tbilisi	2000–01	Umaglesi Liga	11	0			–		1	0	–		12	0
Locomotive Tbilisi	Total		16	1			0	0	1	0	0	0	17	1
Dundee	2000–01	Scottish Premier League	6	0	0	0	0	0	–		–		6	0
Dundee	2001–02	Scottish Premier League	18	0	0	0	2	0	–		–		20	0
Dundee	2002–03	Scottish Premier League	19	0	5	0	1	0	–		–		25	0
Dundee	Total		43	0	5	0	3	0	0	0	0	0	51	0
Rangers	2003–04	Scottish Premier League	26	0	1	0	3	0	8	0	–		38	0
Rangers	2004–05	Scottish Premier League	16	0	1	0	2	0	6	0	–		25	0
Rangers	2005–06	Scottish Premier League	0	0	0	0	0	0	0	0	–		0	0
Rangers	Total		42	0	2	0	5	0	14	0	0	0	63	0
Blackburn Rovers (loan)	2005–06	Premier League	26	1	2	0	4	1	–		–		32	2
Blackburn Rovers	2006–07	Premier League	18	0	5	0	1	0	6	0	–		30	0
Blackburn Rovers	2007–08	Premier League	13	0	1	0	2	0	1	0	–		17	0
Blackburn Rovers	2008–09	Premier League	5	0	4	0	3	0	–		–		12	0
Blackburn Rovers	2009–10	Premier League	0	0	1	0	1	0	–		–		2	0
Blackburn Rovers	2010–11	Premier League	0	0	0	0	0	0	–		–		0	0
Blackburn Rovers	Total		36	0	11	0	7	0	7	0	0	0	61	0
Newcastle United (loan)	2009–10	Championship	7	0	0	0	0	0	–		–		7	0
Reading (loan)	2009–10	Championship	15	0	0	0	0	0	–		–		15	0
Reading (loan)	2010–11	Championship	22	0	2	0	0	0	–		3	0	27	0
Reading (loan)	Total		37	0	2	0	0	0	0	0	3	0	42	0
Kayserispor	2011–12	Süper Lig	33	1	2	0	–		–		4	0	39	1
Kayserispor	2012–13	Süper Lig	29	0	0	0	–		–		–		29	0
Kayserispor	2013–14	Süper Lig	18	0	3	0	–		–		–		21	0
Kayserispor	Total		80	1	5	0	0	0	0	0	4	0	89	1
Dinamo Tbilisi	2014–15	Umaglesi Liga	4	0	1	0	–		0	0	0	0	5	0
Samtredia	2014–15	Umaglesi Liga	14	0	0	0	–		–		–		14	0
Inter Baku	2015–16	Azerbaijan Premier League	24	3	3	0	–		6	0	–		33	3
Inter Baku	2016–17	Azerbaijan Premier League	26	3	5	0	–		–		–		31	3
Inter Baku	Total		50	6	8	0	0	0	6	0	0	0	64	6
Career total			355	10	36	0	19	0	28	0	7	0	445	10

=== International ===
Goal	Date	Venue	Opponent	Score	Result	Competition
1	6 June 2009	Mikheil Meskhi Stadium, Tbilisi, Georgia	Moldova	1 – 2	1–2	Friendly

== Honours ==
Rangers

- League Cup: 2004–05
- Scottish Premier League: 2004–05

Individual

- SFWA Young Player of the Year: 2002–03
