= Aaron Mokoena =

South African soccer player (born 1980)

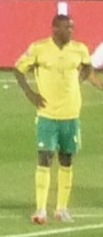

Personal information
- Full name: Teboho Aaron Mokoena
- Date of birth: 25 November 1980 (age 45)
- Place of birth: Boipatong, South Africa
- Height: 1.85 m (6 ft 1 in)
- Positions: Defensive midfielder; centre back

Youth career
- Jomo Cosmos
- Bayer Leverkusen

Senior career*
Years	Team	Apps	(Gls)
1999–2003	Ajax	7	(0)
2001	→ Germinal Beerschot (loan)	12	(1)
2002	→ Germinal Beerschot (loan)	29	(1)
2003–2005	KRC Genk	32	(1)
2005–2009	Blackburn Rovers	101	(0)
2009–2012	Portsmouth	77	(2)
2012–2013	Bidvest Wits	14	(0)
Total		272	(5)

International career
- South Africa U-23
1999–2010	South Africa	107	(1)
- * Club domestic league appearances and goals

Teboho Aaron Mokoena /ˌmɒkoʊˈɛnə/ (born 25 November 1980) is a South African former soccer player. He is currently the assistant coach of Cape Town City.

Mokoena's professional career as a player spanned 14 seasons among football clubs in the Netherlands, Belgium, England and South Africa.

He played for South Africa at the 2000 Olympics, where they finished third in Group D. Mokoena also played at the 2002 and 2004 Africa Cup of Nations. In January 2008, Mokoena captained South Africa in the 2008 Africa Cup of Nations in Ghana. He retained the captaincy for the 2009 FIFA Confederations Cup and 2010 FIFA World Cup, both held in his homeland.

== Club career ==
=== Early career ===
Mokoena was born in Boipatong. He moved to Bayer Leverkusen and Ajax, before twice being loaned out to Germinal Beerschot and then transferring to KRC Genk for two years. On 4 January 2005, aged 24 he moved to Premier League side Blackburn Rovers in which he described his move as a dream.

=== Blackburn Rovers ===
Mokoena made his debut for Blackburn on 8 January 2005 in an FA Cup match against Cardiff City, coming on as a 43rd-minute substitute for Barry Ferguson. After this, Mark Hughes mainly utilised Mokoena as a holding midfielder. Mokoena went on to be a regular in the starting line-up for the remainder of the season, appearing 22 times in total. He was used by Hughes as the holding midfielder in a three-man midfield in a defensive 4–5–1 formation, a move which saw Blackburn concede fewer goals and move away from relegation danger.

Hughes later reverted to a 4–4–2 formation. From then on, Mokoena found himself used sparingly as a holding midfielder in his favoured 4–5–1 formation as a second-half substitute, charged with protecting leads in games in which Blackburn were winning. With Robbie Savage out injured for Rovers, Mokoena started most of the team's games in 2007 and he scored his first goal for Blackburn in an FA Cup 6th round victory against Manchester City on 11 March 2007. However, he was later sent off after getting a second yellow card. He scored his second and final Blackburn goal against Sunderland in February 2009, again this time in the FA Cup replay in Rovers' 2–1 win at Ewood Park which was also voted as goal of the season for the 2008–09 season. Mokoena played his final game for Blackburn Rovers on 24 May 2009 against West Bromwich Albion at Ewood Park in the 0–0 draw.

=== Portsmouth ===
On 24 May 2009, Mokoena announced he would be joining fellow Premier League outfit Portsmouth on a three-year deal. He scored his first goal for Portsmouth in the last minute of extra time to give them victory over Coventry City at the Ricoh Arena in the dying seconds in the FA Cup third round replay on 12 January 2010. Mokoena played a major part in the games against Coventry, Sunderland, South Coast rivals Southampton, Birmingham and Tottenham. He stated that he desired the move to secure regular football, especially in the run up to the 2010 World Cup held in South Africa his native.

Mokoena scored his first league goal in English football (having previously scored three in the FA Cup) when he netted on 58 minutes and completed the full 90 minutes in a 3–1 victory over Bristol City at Fratton Park on 28 September 2010.

On 28 October 2010, Mokoena signed a new two-and-a-half-year deal with Pompey lasting until summer 2013. He made 70 appearances and has scored three goals for Portsmouth in all competitions. On 18 June 2011, he said that he could be leaving Portsmouth because he has been very frustrated at being on the bench on a regular basis.

Following Portsmouth going into administration in February 2012 and the club's subsequent relegation into the third-tier Football League One, Mokoena was identified a potential key player to leave due to his relatively high salary. During this time Mokoena was strongly linked with a transfer to Bidvest Wits and did not show up to the first day of pre-season training. On 10 July, Portsmouth manager Michael Appleton stated that he believed Mokoena would leave Portsmouth within 24 hours.

On 12 July 2012, Mokoena agreed a contract termination with Portsmouth.

=== Bidvest Wits ===
On 11 July 2012 Mokoena completed his move from Portsmouth to Bidvest Wits. On 20 July, he was officially presented at his new club.

== International Career ==
Barely two months after making his first-team debut for Jomo Cosmos, Mokoena was selected for the South African squad for the 1998 African Cup of Nations in Burkina Faso by his club coach, Jomo Sono, who had just been appointed as the national team's interim coach shortly before the tournament, thus becoming the youngest South African player to be called up for an Africa Cup of Nations tournament, but he did not make any appearance in the competition as South Africa were defeated in the final by Egypt. He was also selected into that year's FIFA World Cup preliminary squad by Sono's successor, Philippe Troussier, but did not make the final 23-man squad.

Mokoena's senior debut came much later, appearing against Botswana in a COSAFA Castle Cup match in February 1999. At the time of his debut, he was 18 years, two months, and 26 days, which made him the youngest player to ever represent South Africa at the senior international level, a record he held for 15 years. From there, he went on to feature in two of South Africa's last three qualifiers for the 2000 African Cup of Nations, though he was left out of the squad for the finals after the nation qualified. He was, however, selected for the South African Under-23 squad for the 2000 Olympic Summer Games in Sydney. Mokoena played in all three group stage matches as South Africa were eliminated in the first round.

His move to Belgium proved important to his international career, as his strong club form earned him a regular place in South Africa's established defence, initially at right-back position. The year 2002 proved particularly significant for Mokoena at international level. In January, he was selected for his second Africa Cup of Nations, this time held in Mali. He made his first appearance at the tournament in South Africa’s opening group match, a goalless draw against Burkina Faso, before retaining his place in central defence for the subsequent match against Ghana. South Africa recorded consecutive clean sheets in their opening two group matches for the first time since their tournament debut in 1996, and Mokoena had a goal disallowed against Ghana. He also featured in the 3–1 victory over Morocco in the final group match, which secured South Africa’s progression to the knockout stage. However, their campaign ended in the quarter-finals.

Later that year, Mokoena was named in South Africa's final 23-man squad to compete at the 2002 FIFA World Cup and made his first World Cup Finals appearance in South Africa's opening game, a 2–2 draw against Paraguay. He also went on play every minute of South Africa's 1-0 win over Slovenia, which achieved a historic three points at the tournament. South Africa therefore entered their final group match against Spain needing only a draw to progress to the knockout stage. Mokoena gained prominence for his goal clearing opportunity against Spain, which would have brought the score to 2–0 after Raul's opener nine minutes prior. However, South Africa still suffered a 3-2 defeat to the Spanish in the end and as for the result, despite heroic efforts by Mokoena, his team failed to progress from the group stage.

Following the World Cup, Mokoena was reunited with his former Under-23 coach, Ephraim Mashaba, who took charge of the senior national team as South Africa began their campaign to qualify for the 2004 African Cup of Nations. Mokoena established himself as one of the team's regular defenders, forming a partnership with Orlando Pirates' defender Mbulelo Mabizela at center-back. He featured in all four qualifying matches as well as six friendlies and was included in the squad for the 2004 African Cup of Nations in Tunisia. In the tournament, Mokoena helped South Africa to a 2-0 victory over Benin in their opening match, before starting against Nigeria, where he conceded a penalty from which Jay Jay Okocha scored in a 4-0 defeat. He retained his place for the final group match against Morocco, but South Africa were eliminated after a 1-1 draw. Following the tournament, Mokoena and Mabizela came under criticism in a SAFA report over their involvement in the wage dispute, but were defended by veteran teammate Andre Arendse, who stated that the entire squad had supported their position during the pay negotiations.

Later that year, following Mabizela's removal as captain after he reported late for training, Mokoena was appointed permanent captain of South Africa. However, with Mokoena as captain, South Africa failed to qualify for the 2006 FIFA World Cup, their first absence from the competition since the 1994 FIFA World Cup. They nevertheless qualified for the 2006 African Cup of Nations after finishing among the top three teams in their World Cup qualifying group. Mokoena was initially involved in preparations for the tournament, but a dispute arose after coach Ted Dumitru removed him as captain and appointed Sibusiso Zuma in his place. Mokoena subsequently withdrew from the squad.

Following Dumitru's dismissal after South Africa's poor performances at the tournament, Mokoena was recalled by interim coach Pitso Mosimane and reinstated as national team captain. Mokoena went on to repay Mosimane's faith in him by scoring his first and only international goal for Bafana Bafana against Zambia in a 2008 Africa Cup of Nations qualifying match. Mosimane was subsequently replaced by Carlos Alberto Parreira, who also placed his faith in the experienced defender. Mokoena continued as captain during the remainder of South Africa's qualification campaign for the 2008 Africa Cup of Nations and helped the team secure qualification.

In January 2008, he was selected for the squad for the finals in Ghana, becoming the fourth South African player to be selected for four Africa Cup of Nations tournaments, joining Andre Arendse, John Moshoeu and Siyabonga Nomvethe in holding the record. Mokoena started all three of South Africa's matches and captained the national team at the Africa Cup of Nations for the first time, in what was his third tournament appearance. South Africa finished bottom of their group and failed to advance to the knockout stage. In South Africa's final group match against Senegal, Mokoena made his 73rd appearance for the national team, drawing level with John Moshoeu as the second most-capped player in South African national football history, behind Shaun Bartlett.

On 26 March 2008, he made his 74th appearance for South Africa in a 3-0 friendly home win against Paraguay, overtaking Moshoeu and joining Shaun Bartlett as his nation's joint-highest appearance holder at the time. The match was Carlos Alberto Parreira's final game in his first spell as South Africa coach, as he returned to Brazil to care for his ill wife. He was subsequently replaced by his compatriot Joel Santana. Mokoena then became South Africa's sole record appearance holder when he started in a 2-0 defeat to Nigeria on 1 June 2008, in the opening match of the 2010 Africa Cup of Nations qualifying campaign. South Africa ultimately failed to qualify for the finals after finishing second in their group, missing out on the competition for the first time since the 1994 edition.

South Africa qualified automatically for the 2009 FIFA Confederations Cup as hosts of the 2010 FIFA World Cup, and Mokoena was once again appointed captain. In the team's second match against New Zealand, he equalled Lucas Radebe's record for the most appearances as captain of the national team. In their final group match against Spain, Mokoena broke the record by captaining South Africa for the 44th time. During the match, he conceded a penalty, which was taken by David Villa and was saved by Itumeleng Khune, although South Africa went on to lose 2-0. South Africa nevertheless progressed to the semi-finals, marking their first progression to the knockout stage of the FIFA Confederations Cup and their first progression beyond the group stage of a major tournament since the 2002 African Cup of Nations. They faced Brazil in the semi-final, where Mokoena conceded a free kick just outside the penalty area, from which Dani Alves scored the winning goal as South Africa lost 1–0. South Africa then faced Spain again in the third-place place play-off and lost 3-2 after extra time, finishing fourth.

The defeat to Spain in the final group match began a six-match losing streak for South Africa, which was ended by a victory over Madagascar in September 2009, a match in which Mokoena did not feature. South Africa's poor run continued thereafter, contributing to Joel Santana's departure as coach in October 2009 and the return of Carlos Alberto Parreira. As hosts, South Africa qualified automatically for the 2010 FIFA World Cup and used a series of friendly matches to prepare for the tournament. Mokoena won his 100th cap against Guatemala in Polokwane in a 5–0 win on 31 May 2010, and celebrated by taking to the field wearing the number 100 on the back of his shirt. He was subsequently named in coach Carlos Alberto Parreira's squad for the 2010 FIFA World Cup, becoming, alongside Siyabonga Nomvethe, one of the first South African players to be selected for seven major international tournaments.

On 11 June 2010, he captained Bafana Bafana in their opening group game against Mexico at the World Cup, where his positioning kept three Mexican attackers onside in the buildup to Rafael Márquez's equaliser in the 1-1 draw. On 16 June 2010, Mokoena again skippered the Bafana Bafana this time in their 3–0 defeat by Uruguay at the Loftus Versfeld Stadium. On 22 June, he started in the 2–1 win over France at the Free State Stadium in Bloemfontein, bringing his World Cup appearances level with Benni McCarthy, Quinton Fortune and Lucas Radebe for the most by a South African player in the competition, as South Africa became the first host nation to be eliminated in the group stage.

Following the appointment of Pitso Mosimane as South Africa manager after the World Cup, Mokoena was rarely selected during the remainder of 2010, despite his determination to fight for his place in the squad. He made his final appearance for South Africa in October 2010. At the beginning of 2011, Mosimane dropped him from the national team squad, while Steven Pienaar succeeded him as captain.

In total, Mokoena made 107 appearances for the South Africa national team, scoring one goal.

=== International goals ===
Scores and results list South Africa's goal tally first, score column indicates score after Mokoena goal.

International goal scored by Aaron Mokoena
No.	Date	Venue	Opponent	Score	Result	Competition
1	8 October 2006	Lusaka, Zambia	Zambia	1–0	1–0	ACN qualifier

== Honours ==
Portsmouth

- FA Cup runner-up: 2009–10

== See also ==
- List of men's footballers with 100 or more international caps
