= Sergio Peter =

German footballer (born 1986)

Personal information
- Full name: Sergio Mario Peter
- Date of birth: 12 October 1986 (age 40)
- Place of birth: Ludwigshafen, West Germany
- Height: 1.74 m (5 ft 9 in)
- Position: Winger

Youth career
- 2000–2003: TSV Mannheim Schönau
- 2003–2004: Waldhof Mannheim
- 2004–2005: Blackburn Rovers

Senior career*
Years	Team	Apps	(Gls)
2005–2009	Blackburn Rovers	17	(0)
2005	→ Cercle Brugge (loan)	5	(0)
2009	Sparta Prague	2	(0)
2010–2011	SpVgg Neckarelz		
2012–2013	VfR Bürstadt		
- TuS Rüssingen
Total		24	(0)
- * Club domestic league appearances and goals

Sergio Mario Peter (born 12 October 1986) is a German former professional footballer who played as a winger.

== Early career ==
Born in Ludwigshafen, Rhineland-Palatinate, Peter began his career with TSV Mannheim Schönau and joined local heavyweight Waldhof Mannheim in 2003. After a successful year with Waldhof Mannheim, Peter left the club and signed a contract with Youth Academy Brockhall in July 2004.

== Career ==
Peter came through the Youth Academy at Blackburn Rovers and joined Belgian side Cercle Brugge on loan from January 2005 until the end of the season. He only made a couple of appearances but he signed a professional contract with Blackburn on 7 July 2005.

Playing predominantly as a left-sided midfielder, Peter impressed in the Blackburn reserves, soon forcing his way into the first team. Peter made his full debut in the FA Cup third round tie with Queens Park Rangers on 7 January 2006, a game Blackburn won 3–0, with Peter setting up all three goals and named man of the match. He went on to make his league debut on 21 January 2006 as a substitute in a 1–0 win away to Newcastle United. In his final appearance for Blackburn, Peter came on as an extra time substitute as they lost in the 2007 FA Cup semi finals to Chelsea.

On 2 January 2009 Peter signed a two-and-a-half year contract with Czech side Sparta Prague. At Sparta he started a league match against FK Viktoria Žižkov but was substituted at half time. He played one further match, the last ten minutes of a game against FC Baník Ostrava, before leaving Sparta in the summer of 2009. In 2017, Czech news site iSport named him as the worst foreign player to appear in the Czech First League in the last 10 seasons.
