= 2013–14 FC Dynamo Moscow season =

Dynamo Moscow
2013–14 season
- Manager: Dan Petrescu until 8 April 2014; Nikolai Kovardayev; Caretaker; 8-10 April 2014; Stanislav Cherchesov from 10 April 2014
- Stadium: Arena Khimki
- Premier League: 4th
- Russian Cup: Fifth Round vs Salyut Belgorod
- Top goalscorer: League: Aleksandr Kokorin (10); All: Aleksandr Kokorin (10)
- Highest home attendance: 16,852 vs CSKA Moscow; 9 March 2013
- Lowest home attendance: 3,045 vs Tom Tomsk; 2 November 2013
- Average home league attendance: 7,826
Home colours	Away colours

The 2013–14 Dynamo Moscow season was the 91st season in the club's history. They participated in the Russian Premier League, finishing 4th whilst also reaching the Fifth Round of Russian Cup, where they were defeated by Salyut Belgorod.

Dynamo started the season under the management of Dan Petrescu, who mutually terminated his contract with the club on 8 April 2014. Konstantin Paramonov was then put in temporary charge of the team before Stanislav Cherchesov was appointed Dynamos permanent manager on 10 April 2014.

== Squad ==
Note: Flags indicate national team as defined under FIFA eligibility rules; some limited exceptions apply. Players may hold more than one non-FIFA nationality.

No.	Pos.	Nation	Player
1	GK	RUS	Anton Shunin
2	DF	RUS	Aleksei Kozlov
3	DF	RUS	Yuri Zhirkov
5	DF	NED	Douglas
6	DF	ARG	Leandro Fernández
7	MF	HUN	Balázs Dzsudzsák
8	MF	RUS	Artur Yusupov
9	FW	RUS	Aleksandr Kokorin
10	FW	UKR	Andriy Voronin
11	MF	RUS	Alan Kasaev (on loan from Rubin Kazan)
13	DF	RUS	Vladimir Granat (captain)
14	FW	RUS	Pavel Solomatin
16	MF	ECU	Christian Noboa
17	MF	RUS	Alan Gatagov
18	GK	ARM	Roman Berezovsky

No.	Pos.	Nation	Player
19	GK	RUS	Yevgeni Frolov
21	MF	ROU	George Florescu
22	FW	GER	Kevin Kurányi
23	DF	AUS	Luke Wilkshire
25	FW	RUS	Vladimir Dyadyun
27	MF	RUS	Igor Denisov
28	DF	FIN	Boris Rotenberg
32	DF	SRB	Marko Lomić
47	MF	RUS	Roman Zobnin
55	GK	RUS	Vladimir Gabulov
59	MF	RUS	Aleksandr Ilyin
61	MF	FIN	Moshtagh Yaghoubi
84	DF	CGO	Christopher Samba
99	MF	RUS	Aleksei Ionov

=== Out on loan ===
Note: Flags indicate national team as defined under FIFA eligibility rules; some limited exceptions apply. Players may hold more than one non-FIFA nationality.

No.	Pos.	Nation	Player
—	DF	RUS	Vladimir Rykov (to Tom Tomsk)
—	MF	RUS	Pavel Ignatovich (to Tom Tomsk)
—	MF	RUS	Aleksandr Sapeta (to Ural Sverdlovsk Oblast)
—	MF	RUS	Vladimir Sobolev (to Anzhi Makhachkala)

No.	Pos.	Nation	Player
—	MF	UKR	Borys Taschy (to Hoverla Uzhhorod)
—	FW	RUS	Andrei Panyukov (to Spartak Nalchik)
—	FW	RUS	Fyodor Smolov (to Anzhi Makhachkala)

=== Youth squad ===
Note: Flags indicate national team as defined under FIFA eligibility rules; some limited exceptions apply. Players may hold more than one non-FIFA nationality.

No.	Pos.	Nation	Player
30	GK	RUS	Yegor Generalov
34	MF	RUS	Artyom Katashevsky
45	DF	RUS	Artyom Yarmolitsky
49	DF	RUS	Grigori Morozov
82	DF	RUS	Pavel Derevyagin
58	FW	RUS	Dmitri Otstavnov
62	FW	RUS	Ivan Kochergin
63	FW	RUS	Aleksandr Maksimenko
64	MF	RUS	Vladislav Pavlyuchenko
71	MF	RUS	Igor Gorbunov
72	DF	RUS	Aleksandr Kalyashin
75	DF	RUS	Nikita Pankevich
76	DF	RUS	Anton Ivanov

No.	Pos.	Nation	Player
77	MF	RUS	Anatoli Katrich
79	MF	RUS	Aleksandr Morgunov
81	DF	RUS	Yegor Danilkin
82	MF	RUS	Guram Adzhoyev
86	MF	RUS	Vladislav Lyovin
87	MF	RUS	Valeri Saramutin
88	MF	RUS	Aleksandr Tashayev
89	GK	RUS	Igor Leshchuk
94	DF	RUS	Dmitri Zhivoglyadov
95	MF	RUS	Dmitri Starodub
96	MF	RUS	Maksim Kuzmin
97	MF	RUS	Anton Altunin

== Transfers ==
=== Summer ===
In: Note: Flags indicate national team as defined under FIFA eligibility rules; some limited exceptions apply. Players may hold more than one non-FIFA nationality.

No.	Pos.	Nation	Player
3	MF	RUS	Yuri Zhirkov (from (Russia) Anzhi Makhachkala)
4	DF	BLR	Igor Shitov (end of loan to (Russia) Mordovia Saransk)
5	DF	NED	Douglas (from (Netherlands) Twente)
9	FW	RUS	Fyodor Smolov (end of loan to (Russia) Anzhi Makhachkala)
10	FW	UKR	Andriy Voronin (end of loan to (Germany) Fortuna Düsseldorf)
11	MF	RUS	Alan Kasaev (on loan from (Russia) Rubin Kazan)
21	MF	ROU	George Florescu (from (Romania) Astra Giurgiu)
25	FW	RUS	Vladimir Dyadyun (from (Russia) Rubin Kazan)
27	MF	RUS	Igor Denisov (from (Russia) Zenit St. Petersburg)
29	DF	FIN	Boris Rotenberg (end of loan to (Cyprus) Olympiakos Nicosia)
55	GK	RUS	Vladimir Gabulov (from (Russia) Anzhi Makhachkala)
56	MF	RUS	Vladimir Sobolev (end of loan to (Russia) FC Khimki)
72	DF	RUS	Aleksandr Kalyashin (from (Russia) Akademiya Togliatti)
84	DF	CGO	Christopher Samba (from (England) Queens Park Rangers)
93	FW	RUS	Andrei Panyukov (end of loan to (Russia) FC Khimki)
99	MF	RUS	Aleksei Ionov (from (Russia) Kuban Krasnodar)

Out: Note: Flags indicate national team as defined under FIFA eligibility rules; some limited exceptions apply. Players may hold more than one non-FIFA nationality.

No.	Pos.	Nation	Player
8	FW	RUS	Sergei Davydov (end of loan from (Russia) Rubin Kazan)
10	MF	RUS	Igor Semshov (to (Russia) Krylia Sovetov Samara)
11	MF	RUS	Pavel Ignatovich (on loan to (Russia) Tom Tomsk)
14	FW	RUS	Pavel Solomatin (on loan to (Russia) Anzhi Makhachkala)
15	DF	MDA	Alexandru Epureanu (on loan to (Russia) Anzhi Makhachkala)
17	MF	RUS	Alan Gatagov (on loan to (Russia) Anzhi Makhachkala)
21	MF	AUT	Jakob Jantscher (end of loan from (Austria) Red Bull Salzburg)
25	DF	RUS	Denis Kolodin (to (Russia) Volga Nizhny Novgorod)
28	MF	NED	Otman Bakkal (released)
31	GK	RUS	Yevgeni Puzin (to (Russia) Sibir Novosibirsk)
33	DF	RUS	Vladimir Rykov (on loan to (Russia) Tom Tomsk)
41	MF	RUS	Aleksandr Sapeta (on loan to (Russia) Ural Sverdlovsk Oblast)
42	MF	RUS	Yuri Kirillov (to (Russia) Ural Sverdlovsk Oblast)
56	MF	RUS	Vladimir Sobolev (on loan to (Russia) Anzhi Makhachkala)
70	MF	RUS	Roman Yeremeyev (to (Russia) Volgar Astrakhan)
90	MF	RUS	Ivan Solovyov (to (Russia) Zenit Saint Petersburg)
—	DF	RUS	Vladimir Kisenkov (to (Russia) Tom Tomsk, previously on loan to (Russia) Rostov)
—	DF	CRO	Gordon Schildenfeld (on loan to (Greece) Panathinaikos, previously on loan to (Greece) PAOK)
—	MF	CRO	Tomislav Dujmović (to (Croatia) RNK Split, previously on loan to (Russia) Mordovia Saransk)
—	MF	UKR	Borys Tashchy (on loan to (Ukraine) Hoverla Uzhhorod, previously on loan to (Ukraine) Chornomorets Odesa)

=== Winter ===
In: Note: Flags indicate national team as defined under FIFA eligibility rules; some limited exceptions apply. Players may hold more than one non-FIFA nationality.

No.	Pos.	Nation	Player
2	DF	RUS	Aleksei Kozlov (from (Russia) Kuban Krasnodar)
14	FW	RUS	Pavel Solomatin (loan return from (Russia) Anzhi Makhachkala)
17	MF	RUS	Alan Gatagov (loan return from (Russia) Anzhi Makhachkala)
61	MF	FIN	Moshtagh Yaghoubi (loan from (Latvia) Spartaks Jūrmala)

Out: Note: Flags indicate national team as defined under FIFA eligibility rules; some limited exceptions apply. Players may hold more than one non-FIFA nationality.

No.	Pos.	Nation	Player
4	DF	BLR	Igor Shitov (to (Russia) Mordovia Saransk)
9	FW	RUS	Fyodor Smolov (loan to (Russia) Anzhi Makhachkala)
93	FW	RUS	Andrei Panyukov (loan to (Russia) Spartak Nalchik)

== Competitions ==
=== Russian Premier League ===
==== Results by matchday ====
Round	1	2	3	4	5	6	7	8	9	10	11	12	13	14	15	16	17	18	19	20	21	22	23	24	25	26	27	28	29	30
Ground	H	H	H	H	A	H	H	A	H	A	H	A	H	A	H	A	A	H	H	H	A	H	A	A	A	H	A	A	A	A
Result	D	W	L	W	D	D	D	W	L	D	W	W	W	L	W	W	L	W	W	W	D	D	W	L	W	L	L	W	W	L
Position	7	4	11	6	6	8	10	6	8	7	7	7	5	6	5	5	7	5	4	4	4	5	4	4	4	4	4	4	4	4

Updated to match(es) played on 19 May 2014. Source: Matches
A = Away; H = Home; W = Win; D = Draw; L = Loss

==== Matches ====
14 July 2013 1	Dynamo Moscow	2–2	Volga Nizhny Novgorod	Arena Khimki
13:30 MSK (UTC+4)	Kasaev 28'; Voronin 30'	Summary	Shulenin 2'; Mukendi 3'	Stadium: Moscow; Attendance: 5,604; Referee: Alexey Nikolaev

19 July 2013 2	Dynamo Moscow	2–1	Anzhi Makhachkala	Moscow
20:00 MSK (UTC+4)	Solomatin 26'; Voronin 90+6' (pen.)	Summary	Ewerton (red card) 33'; Samba 83'	Stadium: Arena Khimki; Attendance: 9,382; Referee: Sergey Karasev

27 July 2013 3	Dynamo Moscow	1–4	Spartak Moscow	Arena Khimki
13:30 MSK (UTC+4)	Voronin 80' (pen.)	Summary	Jurado 7', 42'; Yakovlev 12'; Emenike 30'	Stadium: Moscow; Attendance: 16,714; Referee: Aleksandr Egorov

3 August 2013 4	Dynamo Moscow	1–0	Terek Grozny	Arena Khimki
19:30 MSK (UTC+4)	Noboa 71'	Summary		Stadium: Moscow; Attendance: 5,893; Referee: Igor Nizovtsev

18 August 2013 5	Krasnodar	1–1	Dynamo Moscow	Krasnodar
20:15 MSK (UTC+4)	Wánderson 9'	Summary	Panyukov 83'	Stadium: Kuban Stadium; Attendance: 10,500; Referee: Vladimir Kazmenko

24 August 2013 6	Dynamo Moscow	1–1	Zenit St. Petersburg	Moscow
13:30 MSK (UTC+4)	Dzsudzsák 64'	Summary	Kerzhakov 90+3'	Stadium: Arena Khimki; Attendance: 12,737; Referee: Aleksey Eskov

1 September 2013 7	Dynamo Moscow	1–1	Rostov	Moscow
20:15 MSK (UTC+4)	Kokorin 47'	Summary	Milic 7'	Stadium: Arena Khimki; Attendance: 5,175; Referee: Alexey Nikolaev

16 September 2013 8	Ural	1–4	Dynamo Moscow	Yekaterinburg
17:00 MSK (UTC+4)	Acevedo (red card) 42'; Gogniyev 87'	Summary	Kokorin 7'; Voronin 18', 35', 45' (pen.)	Stadium: Central Stadium; Attendance: 13,200; Referee: Vitali Meshkov

21 September 2013 9	Dynamo Moscow	1–3	Lokomotiv Moscow	Khimki
13:30 MSK (UTC+4)	Noboa 58'; Douglas (red card) 73'	Report	51' N'Doye; 74' (pen.) Samedov; 90+3' Tkachyov	Stadium: Arena Khimki; Attendance: 9,279; Referee: Sergey Karasev

26 September 2013 10	Rubin Kazan'	2–2	Dynamo Moscow	Kazan
20:30 MSK (UTC+4)	Samba 34' (o.g.); Karadeniz 57'; Marcano (yellow card) 20' (yellow-red card) 70'	Summary	Kokorin 39'; Ionov 49'; Kurányi (yellow card) 90+2' (yellow-red card) 90+3'	Stadium: Central Stadium; Attendance: 7,802; Referee: Sergey Lapochkin

29 September 2013 11	Dynamo Moscow	2–0	Krylia Sovetov	Khimki
13:30 MSK (UTC+4)	Kokorin 13'; Zhirkov 79'	Summary		Stadium: Arena Khimki; Attendance: 3,250; Referee: Vitali Meshkov

6 October 2013 12	CSKA Moscow	0–2	Dynamo Moscow	Moscow
13:30 MSK (UTC+4)		Summary	Noboa 57'; Kokorin 89'	Stadium: MSA Lokomotiv; Attendance: 7,700; Referee: Aleksandr Egorov

20 October 2013 13	Dynamo Moscow	3–1	Kuban Krasnodar	Moscow
18:00 MSK (UTC+4)	Voronin 58'; Granat 63'; Kurányi 83' (pen.)	Summary	Baldé 50'; Khubulov (red card) 68'; Tsorayev (red card) 86'	Stadium: Arena Khimki; Attendance: 4,000; Referee: Sergey Lapochkin

26 October 2013 14	Amkar Perm	2–1	Dynamo Moscow	Perm
14:45 MSK (UTC+4)	Vassiljev 23'; Belorukov 31'	Summary	Noboa 62'	Stadium: Zvezda Stadium; Attendance: 9,500; Referee: Sergey Kuznetsov

2 November 2013 15	Dynamo Moscow	1–0	Tom Tomsk	Moscow
16:00 MSK (UTC+4)	Bardachow 42' (o.g.)	Summary		Stadium: Arena Khimki; Attendance: 3,045; Referee: Sergei Ivanov

9 November 2013 16	Krylia Sovetov	1–2	Dynamo Moscow	Samara
16:00 MSK (UTC+4)	Semshov 23'	Summary	Denisov 29'; Noboa 75'	Stadium: Metallurg Stadium; Attendance: 12,356; Referee: Vladislav Bezborodov

24 November 2013 17	Lokomotiv Moscow	1–0	Dynamo Moscow	Moscow
13:30 MSK (UTC+3)	N'Doye 65'	Report		Stadium: Lokomotiv Stadium; Attendance: 14,190; Referee: Alexey Yeskov

30 November 2013 18	Dynamo Moscow	3–0	Ural	Moscow
14:00 MSK (UTC+4)	Granat 28'; Kurányi 58'; Kokorin 70'	Summary		Stadium: Arena Khimki; Attendance: 3,900; Referee: Vitali Meshkov

8 December 2013 19	Dynamo Moscow	2–0	Amkar Perm	Moscow
16:00 MSK (UTC+4)	Kurányi 57', 78' (pen.)	Summary		Stadium: Arena Khimki; Attendance: 5,000; Referee: Alexey Nikolaev

9 March 2013 20	Dynamo Moscow	4–2	CSKA Moscow	Moscow
13:30 MSK (UTC+4)	Kurányi 49'; Samba 59'; Zhirkov 62', 69'	Summary	Doumbia 12', 43'	Stadium: Arena Khimki; Attendance: 16,852; Referee: Vladislav Bezborodov

15 March 2014 21	Kuban Krasnodar	1–1	Dynamo Moscow	Krasnodar
18:30 MSK (UTC+4)	Popov 73'	Summary	Kurányi 43'	Stadium: Kuban Stadium; Attendance: 18,500; Referee: Vitali Meshkov

23 March 2014 22	Dynamo Moscow	0–0	Rubin Kazan'	Moscow
13:30 MSK (UTC+4)		Summary		Stadium: Arena Khimki; Attendance: 8,687; Referee: Mikhail Vilkov

30 March 2014 23	Tom Tomsk	1–3	Dynamo Moscow	Tomsk
15:45 MSK (UTC+4)	Rykov 48'	Summary	Kokorin 51'; Kurányi 64'; Ionov 87'	Stadium: Trud Stadium; Attendance: 4,550; Referee: Aleksandr Egorov

6 April 2014 24	Anzhi Makhachkala	4–0	Dynamo Moscow	Kaspiysk
16:00 MSK (UTC+4)	Bukharov 11'; Smolov 30'; Serderov 66'; Gadzhiyev 83'	Summary		Stadium: Anzhi-Arena; Attendance: 12,980; Referee: Mikhail Vilkov

14 April 2014 25	Volga Nizhny Novgorod	0–5	Dynamo Moscow	Nizhny Novgorod
19:00 MSK (UTC+4)		Summary	Kokorin 53'; Yusupov 75'; Kasaev 76', 90+1'; Samba 84'	Stadium: Lokomotiv Stadium; Attendance: 3,500; Referee: Vitali Meshkov

20 April 2014 26	Dynamo Moscow	1–2	Krasnodar	Moscow
16:00 MSK (UTC+4)	Kokorin 27'; Kozlov (red card) 48'	Summary	Shirokov 73'; Laborde 80'; Laborde (red card) 89'	Stadium: Arena Khimki; Attendance: 7,875; Referee: Vladislav Bezborodov

27 April 2014 27	Terek Grozny	1–0	Dynamo Moscow	Grozny
18:30 MSK (UTC+4)	Maurício 54'	Summary		Stadium: Terek Stadium; Attendance: 22,700; Referee: Aleksandr Egorov

2 May 2014 28	Rostov	2–3	Dynamo Moscow	Rostov-on-Don
19:00 MSK (UTC+4)	Dzyuba 75'; Yoo 85'	Summary	Ionov 1', 17'; Kokorin 68'	Stadium: Olimp – 2 Attendance: 9,150; Referee: Igor Nizovtsev

11 May 2014 29	Zenit St. Petersburg	0–3^{1}	Dynamo Moscow	Saint Petersburg
13:30 MSK (UTC+4)	Danny 6'; Criscito (yellow card) 67'; Kerzhakov 82'	Summary	Yusupov 35'; Denisov (yellow card) 37'; Fernández 57'; Kurányi 71' (yellow card) 63'; Noboa 65'; Dyadyun (yellow card) 83'	Stadium: Petrovsky Stadium; Attendance: 19,089; Referee: Sergei Ivanov

15 May 2014 30	Spartak Moscow	3–2	Dynamo Moscow	Moscow
18:30 MSK (UTC+4)	Jurado 56'; Parshivlyuk 70'; Kombarov 90+8'	Summary	Florescu 38'; Ionov 47'	Stadium: Lokomotiv Stadium; Attendance: 12,180; Referee: Igor Fedotov

==== Table ====
Pos	Team	Pld	W	D	L	GF	GA	GD	Pts	Qualification or relegation
2	Zenit St. Petersburg	30	19	6	5	63	32	+31	63	Qualification for the Champions League third qualifying round
3	Lokomotiv Moscow	30	17	8	5	51	23	+28	59	Qualification for the Europa League play-off round
4	Dynamo Moscow	30	15	7	8	54	37	+17	52	Qualification for the Europa League third qualifying round
5	Krasnodar	30	15	5	10	46	39	+7	50 (Note: Krasnodar ahead of Spartak Moscow on head-to-head points; Krasnodar–Spartak Moscow 4–0, Spartak Moscow–Krasnodar 3–2.)	Qualification for the Europa League second qualifying round
6	Spartak Moscow	30	15	5	10	46	36	+10	50	

Source: Russian Premier League
Rules for classification: 1) points; 2) number of wins; 3) head-to-head points; 4) number of head-to-head wins; 5) head-to-head goal difference; 6) number of head-to-head goals scored; 7) number of head-to-head away goals scored; 8) goal difference; 9) number of goals scored; 10) number of away goals scored; 11) position in the 2012–13 season (only used until all the regularly scheduled games have been played); 11) extra play-off game or tournament between the teams in question.

=== Russian Cup ===
30 October 2013 Fifth Round	Salyut Belgorod	1–0	Dynamo Moscow	Belgorod
18:30 MSK (UTC+4)	Yakovlev 10'	Summary		Stadium: Salyut Stadium; Attendance: 10,300; Referee: Sergey Kulikov

== Statistics ==
=== Appearances and goals ===
No.	Pos	Nat	Player	Total		Premier League		Russian Cup	
No.	Pos	Nat	Player	Apps	Goals	Apps	Goals	Apps	Goals
1	GK	(Russia) RUS	Anton Shunin	7	0	7	0	0	0
2	DF	(Russia) RUS	Aleksei Kozlov	6	0	6	0	0	0
3	DF	(Russia) RUS	Yuri Zhirkov	14	3	8+6	3	0	0
5	DF	(Netherlands) NED	Douglas	21	0	20	0	1	0
6	DF	(Argentina) ARG	Leandro Fernández	13	0	11+2	0	0	0
7	MF	(Hungary) HUN	Balázs Dzsudzsák	24	1	20+3	1	1	0
8	MF	(Russia) RUS	Artur Yusupov	25	1	18+6	1	1	0
9	FW	(Russia) RUS	Aleksandr Kokorin	23	10	20+2	10	0+1	0
10	FW	(Ukraine) UKR	Andriy Voronin	17	7	10+7	7	0	0
11	MF	(Russia) RUS	Alan Kasaev	20	3	12+7	3	1	0
13	DF	(Russia) RUS	Vladimir Granat	29	2	29	2	0	0
14	FW	(Russia) RUS	Pavel Solomatin	9	1	2+7	1	0	0
16	MF	(Ecuador) ECU	Christian Noboa	29	5	27+2	5	0	0
17	MF	(Russia) RUS	Alan Gatagov	1	0	0+1	0	0	0
18	GK	(Armenia) ARM	Roman Berezovsky	3	0	3	0	0	0
21	MF	(Romania) ROU	George Florescu	3	1	1+2	1	0	0
22	FW	(Germany) GER	Kevin Kurányi	15	7	12+3	7	0	0
23	DF	(Australia) AUS	Luke Wilkshire	24	0	20+3	0	1	0
25	FW	(Russia) RUS	Vladimir Dyadyun	20	0	3+16	0	1	0
27	MF	(Russia) RUS	Igor Denisov	25	5	23+1	5	1	0
28	DF	(Finland) FIN	Boris Rotenberg	2	0	0+2	0	0	0
32	DF	(Serbia) SRB	Marko Lomić	23	0	22	0	1	0
47	MF	(Russia) RUS	Roman Zobnin	5	0	2+2	0	0+1	0
55	GK	(Russia) RUS	Vladimir Gabulov	21	0	20	0	1	0
84	DF	(Republic of the Congo) CGO	Christopher Samba	11	2	9+1	2	1	0
99	MF	(Russia) RUS	Aleksei Ionov	18	1	14+4	1	0	0
Players away from Dynamo on loan:
9	FW	(Russia) RUS	Fyodor Smolov	14	0	8+5	0	1	0
93	MF	(Russia) RUS	Vladimir Sobolev	3	0	1+2	0	0	0
93	FW	(Russia) RUS	Andrei Panyukov	4	0	0+3	0	0+1	0
Players who appeared for Dynamo no longer at the club:
44	DF	(Russia) RUS	Nikita Chicherin	2	0	2	0	0	0

=== Scorers ===
Place	Position	Nation	Number	Name	League	Cup	Total
1	FW	(Russia)	9	Aleksandr Kokorin	10	0	10
2	FW	(Ukraine)	10	Andriy Voronin	7	0	7
2	FW	(Germany)	22	Kevin Kurányi	7	0	7
4	MF	(Ecuador)	16	Christian Noboa	5	0	5
4	MF	(Russia)	27	Igor Denisov	5	0	5
6	MF	(Russia)	11	Alan Kasaev	3	0	3
6	DF	(Russia)	3	Yuri Zhirkov	3	0	3
8	DF	(Republic of the Congo)	84	Christopher Samba	2	0	2
8	DF	(Russia)	13	Vladimir Granat	2	0	2
10	MF	(Russia)	8	Artur Yusupov	1	0	1
10	FW	(Russia)	14	Pavel Solomatin	1	0	1
10	FW	(Russia)	93	Andrei Panyukov	1	0	1
10	MF	(Hungary)	7	Balázs Dzsudzsák	1	0	1
10	MF	(Romania)	21	George Florescu	1	0	1
10	MF	(Russia)	99	Aleksei Ionov	1	0	1
10				Own goal	1	0	1
				Awarded Goals	3	0	3
				TOTALS	54	0	54

=== Disciplinary record ===
Number	Nation	Position	Name	Russian Premier League		Russian Cup		Total	
Number	Nation	Position	Name	Yellow card	Red card	Yellow card	Red card	Yellow card	Red card
2	(Russia)	DF	Aleksei Kozlov	1	1	0	0	1	1
5	(Netherlands)	DF	Douglas	3	1	0	0	3	1
6	(Argentina)	DF	Leandro Fernández	3	0	0	0	3	0
7	(Hungary)	MF	Balázs Dzsudzsák	3	0	0	0	3	0
8	(Russia)	MF	Artur Yusupov	2	0	1	0	3	0
9	(Russia)	FW	Aleksandr Kokorin	2	0	0	0	2	0
10	(Ukraine)	FW	Andriy Voronin	2	0	0	0	2	0
11	(Russia)	MF	Alan Kasaev	4	0	0	0	4	0
13	(Russia)	DF	Vladimir Granat	3	0	0	0	3	0
14	(Russia)	FW	Pavel Solomatin	1	0	0	0	1	0
16	(Ecuador)	MF	Christian Noboa	4	0	0	0	4	0
21	(Romania)	MF	George Florescu	1	0	0	0	1	0
22	(Germany)	FW	Kevin Kurányi	6	1	0	0	6	1
23	(Australia)	DF	Luke Wilkshire	9	0	1	0	10	0
25	(Russia)	FW	Vladimir Dyadyun	2	0	0	0	2	0
27	(Russia)	MF	Igor Denisov	4	0	0	0	4	0
32	(Serbia)	DF	Marko Lomić	3	0	0	0	3	0
44	(Russia)	DF	Nikita Chicherin	1	0	0	0	1	0
55	(Russia)	GK	Vladimir Gabulov	3	0	0	0	3	0
84	(Republic of the Congo)	DF	Christopher Samba	2	0	0	0	2	0
			TOTALS	59	3	2	0	61	3

== Notes ==
- Match was interrupted in the 86th minute with Dynamo leading 4-2 when Zenit fans ran out of the stands. At first they stood behind the goal line, when the referee decided to take the teams off the field into the dressing rooms and teams began to leave, one of Zenit fans punched Dynamo player Vladimir Granat, the match was then abandoned.
