= 2013–14 FC Anzhi Makhachkala season =

Anzhi Makhachkala
2013–14 season
- Chairman: Suleyman Kerimov
- Manager: Guus Hiddink until 22 July 2013; Rene Meulensteen from 22 July – 7 August 2013; Gadzhi Gadzhiyev from 7 August 2013
- Stadium: Anzhi-Arena
- Premier League: 16th
- Russian Cup: Round of 32 vs Alania Vladikavkaz
- Europa League: Last 16 vs AZ
- Top goalscorer: League: All: Alexandru Epureanu (3)
- Highest home attendance: 25,000 vs Lokomotiv Moscow; 14 July 2013
- Lowest home attendance: 2,760 vs Sheriff Tiraspol; 28 November 2013
- Average home league attendance: 9,997; 3 April 2014
Home colours	Away colours

The 2013–14 FC Anzhi Makhachkala season was the 4th successive season that Anzhi played in the Russian Premier League, the highest tier of football in Russia, in which they suffered relegation after finishing the season in 16th place. They were knocked out of the Russian Cup at the Round of 32 stage by Alania Vladikavkaz, and they reached the Last 16 of the Europa League where they were defeated by AZ.

== Season review ==
Anzhi started the season in the same manner as the previous season, entering the transfer market and signing Igor Denisov from Zenit Saint Petersburg, Aleksei Ionov from Kuban Krasnodar, Aleksandr Kokorin from Dynamo Moscow and resigning Christopher Samba from QPR. Following a draw and a defeat in their opening two games, Guus Hiddink resigned as manager on 22 July 2013.

Recently appointed Assistant Coach Rene Meulensteen was then put in charge of the team in a caretaker capacity until 8 August 2013, when Gadzhi Gadzhiyev was appointed as the club's manager for a fifth time. The previous day, the club confirmed that Kerimov had decided to make drastic cuts to the team's budget, and the club's president, Konstantin Remchukov, suggested on Twitter that "a lot of expensive players will leave". As a result, Igor Denisov, Yuri Zhirkov and Aleksandr Kokorin, before Kokorin had made his debut, all left Anzhi in a package deal for Dynamo Moscow whilst Oleg Shatov left the club shortly after joining Zenit St. Petersburg. These sales prompted the club to recall Nikita Burmistrov and Serder Serderov from their loan deals, before Mbark Boussoufa and Lassana Diarra then joined Lokomotiv Moscow. On 29 August Arseniy Logashov joined Lokomotiv Moscow, whilst Vladimir Gabulov, Christopher Samba and Aleksei Ionov all joined Dynamo Moscow, and Samuel Eto'o joined Chelsea.

== Squad ==
As of match played 15 May 2014

No.	Name	Nationality	Position	Date of birth (age)	Signed from	Signed in	Contract ends	Apps.	Goals
Goalkeepers
1	Yevgeny Pomazan	(Russia)	GK	31 January 1989 (aged 25)	CSKA Moscow	2011		19	0
22	Mikhail Kerzhakov	(Russia)	GK	28 January 1987 (aged 27)	Volga Nizhny Novgorod	2013		30	0
27	Mehdi Jannatov	(Russia)	GK	26 January 1992 (aged 22)	Trainee	2012		0	0
Defenders
2	Andrey Yeshchenko	(Russia)	DF	9 February 1984 (aged 30)	Lokomotiv Moscow	2013		29	0
3	Ali Gadzhibekov	(Russia)	DF	6 September 1983 (aged 30)	Trainee	2006		126	2
4	Benoît Angbwa	(Cameroon)	DF	1 January 1982 (aged 32)	Krylia Sovetov	2013		47	4
5	Gia Grigalava	(Georgia (country))	DF	5 July 1989 (aged 24)	Krylia Sovetov	2013		29	1
6	Alexandru Epureanu	(Moldova)	DF	27 September 1986 (aged 27)	Loan from Dynamo Moscow	2013	2014	26	3
7	Kamil Agalarov	(Russia)	DF	11 June 1988 (aged 25)	Loan from FC Rostov	2013	2014	133	3
13	Rasim Tagirbekov	(Russia)	DF	4 May 1984 (aged 30)	Trainee	2002		311	20
37	Ewerton	(Brazil)	DF	23 March 1989 (aged 25)	Corinthians Alagoano	2012		32	2
44	Murad Kurbanov	(Russia)	DF	22 March 1992 (aged 22)	Trainee	2010		0	0
70	Yuri Udunyan	(Russia)	DF	25 August 1994 (aged 19)	Trainee	2011		0	0
75	Anvar Ibragimgadzhiyev	(Russia)	DF	27 September 1991 (aged 22)	Zimbru Chișinău	2014		1	0
93	Islam Suleymanov	(Russia)	DF	2 June 1993 (aged 20)	Zenit Saint Petersburg	2011		0	0
Midfielders
8	Oleksandr Aliyev	(Ukraine)	MF	3 February 1985 (aged 29)	Dynamo Kyiv	2014		11	1
15	Diniyar Bilyaletdinov	(Russia)	MF	27 February 1985 (aged 29)	loan from Spartak Moscow	2014	2014	11	2
16	Karlen Mkrtchyan	(Armenia)	MF	25 November 1988 (aged 25)	Metalurh Donetsk	2013		18	1
17	Sharif Mukhammad	(Russia)	MF	21 March 1990 (aged 24)	Trainee	2010		14	0
20	Vladimir Sobolev	(Russia)	MF	30 July 1991 (aged 22)	Loan from Dynamo Moscow	2013	2014	14	0
25	Odil Ahmedov	(Uzbekistan)	MF	25 November 1987 (aged 26)	Pakhtakor Tashkent	2011		115	6
33	Anvar Gazimagomedov	(Russia)	MF	11 May 1988 (aged 26)	Dagdizel Kaspiysk	2014		0	0
34	Vladimir Bystrov	(Russia)	MF	31 January 1984 (aged 30)	loan from Zenit Saint Petersburg	2014	2014	11	1
40	Salim Makhachyov	(Russia)	MF	14 December 1996 (aged 17)	Trainee	2013		0	0
43	Rizvan Umarov	(Azerbaijan)	MF	5 April 1993 (aged 21)	Elche	2014		0	0
45	Timur Patakhov	(Russia)	MF	4 May 1996 (aged 18)	Trainee	2013		0	0
53	Ismail Korgoloyev	(Russia)	MF	15 March 1994 (aged 20)	Trainee	2012		0	0
57	Magomed Gamidov	(Russia)	MF	20 September 1994 (aged 19)	Trainee	2011		0	0
78	Azret Omarov	(Russia)	MF	30 July 1993 (aged 20)	Unattached	2012		0	0
87	Ilya Maksimov	(Russia)	MF	2 February 1987 (aged 27)	Krylia Sovetov	2013		15	0
91	Makhach Gadzhiyev	(Russia)	MF	18 October 1987 (aged 26)	Amkar Perm	2014		29	4
Forwards
10	Fyodor Smolov	(Russia)	FW	9 February 1990 (aged 24)	Loan from Dynamo Moscow	2014	2014	34	3
28	Serder Serderov	(Russia)	FW	10 March 1994 (aged 20)	CSKA Moscow	2012		35	3
30	Aleksandr Bukharov	(Russia)	FW	12 March 1985 (aged 29)	loan from Zenit Saint Petersburg	2014	2014	14	2
39	Gustavo Leschuk	(Argentina)	FW	5 November 1991 (aged 22)	Arsenal	2014		0	0
71	Magomedzagir Zagirov	(Russia)	FW	8 January 1994 (aged 20)	Trainee	2012		0	0
73	Mariz Saidov	(Russia)	FW	8 February 1995 (aged 19)	Trainee	2012		0	0
81	Nikita Burmistrov	(Russia)	FW	6 July 1989 (aged 24)	Amkar Perm	2012		25	3
99	Islamnur Abdulavov	(Russia)	FW	7 March 1994 (aged 20)	Youth Team	2013		15	1
Away on loan
Players who left during the season
1	Vladimir Gabulov	(Russia)	GK	19 October 1983 (aged 30)	Dynamo Moscow	2011		60	0
4	Christopher Samba	(Republic of the Congo)	DF	28 March 1984 (aged 30)	Queens Park Rangers	2013		45	5
5	João Carlos	(Brazil)	DF	1 January 1982 (aged 32)	Genk	2011		75	5
6	Mbark Boussoufa	(Morocco)	MF	15 August 1984 (aged 29)	Anderlecht	2011		87	13
7	Igor Denisov	(Russia)	MF	17 May 1984 (aged 29)	FCZenit St.Petersburg	2013		3	0
8	Jucilei	(Brazil)	MF	6 April 1988 (aged 26)	Corinthians	2011		98	2
9	Samuel Eto'o	(Cameroon)	FW	10 March 1981 (aged 33)	Internazionale	2011		72	36
10	Willian	(Brazil)	MF	9 August 1988 (aged 25)	Shakhtar Donetsk	2013		17	1
10	Alan Gatagov	(Russia)	MF	23 January 1991 (aged 23)	loan from Dynamo Moscow	2013	2013	12	1
14	Oleg Shatov	(Russia)	MF	29 July 1990 (aged 23)	Viz-Sinara Ekaterinburg	2012		49	5
14	Pavel Solomatin	(Russia)	FW	4 April 1993 (aged 21)	loan from Dynamo Moscow	2013	2013	17	2
15	Arseny Logashov	(Russia)	DF	20 August 1991 (aged 22)	FC Khimki	2011		43	0
15	Vadim Demidov	(Norway)	MF	10 October 1986 (aged 27)	Eintracht Frankfurt	2013		2	0
19	Lacina Traoré	(Ivory Coast)	FW	20 May 1990 (aged 23)	Kuban Krasnodar	2012		46	18
21	Aleksei Ionov	(Russia)	MF	18 February 1989 (aged 25)	Kuban Krasnodar	2013		6	0
24	Dele Adeleye	(Nigeria)	DF	25 December 1988 (aged 25)	Kuban Krasnodar	2013		13	0
29	Abdul Razak	(Ivory Coast)	MF	11 November 1992 (aged 21)	Manchester City	2013		11	0
16	Mehdi Carcela	(Morocco)	MF	1 July 1989 (aged 24)	Standard Liège	2011		46	2
85	Lassana Diarra	(France)	MF	10 March 1985 (aged 29)	Real Madrid	2012		27	1

== Transfers ==
=== In ===
Date	Position	Nationality	Name	From	Fee	Ref.
3 June 2013	MF	(Russia)	Aleksei Ionov	Kuban Krasnodar	Undisclosed	
21 June 2013	GK	(Russia)	Mikhail Kerzhakov	Volga Nizhny Novgorod	Undisclosed	
26 June 2013	MF	(Russia)	Igor Denisov	Zenit St.Petersburg	€15,000,000	
5 July 2013	DF	(Republic of the Congo)	Christopher Samba	Queens Park Rangers	Undisclosed	
10 July 2013	FW	(Russia)	Aleksandr Kokorin	Dynamo Moscow	Undisclosed	
30 August 2013	DF	(Cameroon)	Benoît Angbwa	Krylia Sovetov	Undisclosed	
30 August 2013	DF	(Georgia (country))	Gia Grigalava	Krylia Sovetov	Undisclosed	
30 August 2013	DF	(Nigeria)	Dele Adeleye	Kuban Krasnodar	Undisclosed	
30 August 2013	MF	(Russia)	Ilya Maksimov	Krylia Sovetov	Undisclosed	
3 September 2013	DF	(Norway)	Vadim Demidov	Eintracht Frankfurt	Undisclosed	
17 October 2013	MF	(Ivory Coast)	Abdul Razak	Manchester City	Undisclosed	
1 January 2014	DF	(Russia)	Anvar Ibragimgadzhiyev	Zimbru Chișinău	Undisclosed	
1 January 2014	MF	(Russia)	Anvar Gazimagomedov	Dagdizel Kaspiysk	Undisclosed	
15 January 2014	MF	(Ukraine)	Oleksandr Aliyev	Dynamo Kyiv	Undisclosed	
9 February 2014	MF	(Russia)	Makhach Gadzhiyev	Amkar Perm	Undisclosed	
18 February 2014	MF	(Azerbaijan)	Rizvan Umarov	Elche	Undisclosed	
27 February 2014	FW	(Argentina)	Gustavo Leschuk	Arsenal	Free	

=== Loans in ===
Date from	Position	Nationality	Name	From	Date to	Ref.
30 August 2013	DF	(Moldova)	Alexandru Epureanu	Dynamo Moscow	30 June 2014	
30 August 2013	DF	(Russia)	Kamil Agalarov	Rostov	30 June 2014	
30 August 2013	MF	(Armenia)	Karlen Mkrtchyan	Metalurh Donetsk	30 June 2014	
30 August 2013	MF	(Russia)	Alan Gatagov	Dynamo Moscow	24 January 2014	
30 August 2013	MF	(Russia)	Vladimir Sobolev	Dynamo Moscow	30 June 2014	
30 August 2013	FW	(Russia)	Pavel Solomatin	Dynamo Moscow	24 January 2014	
3 September 2013	MF	(Ivory Coast)	Abdul Razak	Manchester City	17 October 2013	
24 January 2014	FW	(Russia)	Aleksandr Bukharov	Zenit St.Petersburg	30 June 2014	
31 January 2014	MF	(Russia)	Vladimir Bystrov	Zenit St.Petersburg	30 June 2014	
31 January 2014	FW	(Russia)	Fyodor Smolov	Dynamo Moscow	30 June 2014	
7 February 2014	MF	(Russia)	Diniyar Bilyaletdinov	Spartak Moscow	30 June 2014	

=== Out ===
Date	Position	Nationality	Name	To	Fee	Ref.
21 June 2013	DF	(Russia)	Kamil Agalarov	Rostov	Undisclosed	
14 August 2013	MF	(Russia)	Oleg Shatov	Zenit St.Petersburg	Undisclosed	
16 August 2013	DF	(Russia)	Yuri Zhirkov	Dynamo Moscow	Undisclosed	
16 August 2013	MF	(Morocco)	Mbark Boussoufa	Lokomotiv Moscow	Undisclosed	
16 August 2013	MF	(Russia)	Igor Denisov	Dynamo Moscow	Undisclosed	
16 August 2013	FW	(Russia)	Aleksandr Kokorin	Dynamo Moscow	Undisclosed	
20 August 2013	MF	(France)	Lassana Diarra	Lokomotiv Moscow	Undisclosed	
22 August 2013	DF	(Brazil)	João Carlos	Spartak Moscow	Undisclosed	
28 August 2013	MF	(Brazil)	Willian	Chelsea	Undisclosed	
29 August 2013	GK	(Russia)	Vladimir Gabulov	Dynamo Moscow	Undisclosed	
29 August 2013	DF	(Republic of the Congo)	Christopher Samba	Dynamo Moscow	Undisclosed	
29 August 2013	DF	(Russia)	Arseny Logashov	Lokomotiv Moscow	Undisclosed	
29 August 2013	MF	(Russia)	Aleksei Ionov	Dynamo Moscow	Undisclosed	
29 August 2013	FW	(Cameroon)	Samuel Eto'o	Chelsea	Undisclosed	
1 September 2013	MF	(Morocco)	Mehdi Carcela	Standard Liège	Undisclosed	
4 January 2014	FW	(Ivory Coast)	Lacina Traoré	AS Monaco	Undisclosed	
14 January 2014	MF	(Brazil)	Jucilei	Al Jazira	Undisclosed	
31 January 2014	DF	(Nigeria)	Dele Adeleye	Ergotelis	Undisclosed	

=== Loans out ===
Date from	Position	Nationality	Name	To	Date to	Ref.
24 January 2013	FW	(Russia)	Nikita Burmistrov	Amkar Perm	16 August 2013	
21 June 2013	GK	(Russia)	Yevgeny Pomazan	Ural Sverdlovsk Oblast	2 September 2013	
21 June 2013	FW	(Russia)	Serder Serderov	Ural Sverdlovsk Oblast	16 August 2013	

=== Released ===
Date	Position	Nationality	Name	Joined	Date	Ref.
29 January 2014	DF	(Norway)	Vadim Demidov	Brann	29 January 2014	
30 January 2014	MF	(Ivory Coast)	Abdul Razak	West Ham United	30 January 2014	
30 June 2014	DF	(Russia)	Anvar Ibragimgadzhiyev	Retired		
30 June 2014	MF	(Russia)	Makhach Gadzhiyev	Retired		

== Friendlies ==
27 June 2013	Inter Baku (Azerbaijan)	0–1	(Russia) Anzhi Makhachkala	Austria
MSK (UTC+4)		Video; Summary	Ionov 61'

7 July 2013	Anzhi Makhachkala (Russia)	0–0	(Greece) PAOK	Bruck an der Mur, Austria
19:00 MSK (UTC+4)		Video		Stadium: Murinselstadion

13 August 2013	SV Windischgarsten (Austria)	0–8	(Russia) Anzhi Makhachkala	Austria
MSK (UTC+4)		Summary	Carcela 20', 61'; I.Abdulavov 29'; K. Gossweiner 33' (o.g.); Jucilei 42'; Musalov 45'; O.Azret 60'; M.Kurbanov 65'

23 January 2014	Anzhi Makhachkala (Russia)	1–0	(Ukraine) Volyn Lutsk	Antalya, Turkey
19:00 MSK (UTC+4)	Serderov 53'	Summary		Referee: Mekhmet

26 January 2014	Anzhi Makhachkala (Russia)	2–1	(Romania) Petrolul Ploiești	Antalya, Turkey
MSK (UTC+4)	Asildarov 85' (pen.); Serderov 87'	Summary	Mutu 11'	Referee: V. Yukhmet

29 January 2014	Anzhi Makhachkala (Russia)	2–1	(Romania) Vaslui	Antalya, Turkey
MSK (UTC+4)	Aliyev 33' (pen.); Bukharov 65'	Summary	Georgy 44' (pen.)	Referee: E. Mukhchinov

2 February 2014	Anzhi Makhachkala (Russia)	5–0	(Serbia) Timok Zaječar	Antalya, Turkey
MSK (UTC+4)	Smolov 11'; Burmistrov 60'; Abdulavov 69', 90'; Mkrtchyan 88'	Summary		Referee: Kifot

14 February 2014	Anzhi Makhachkala (Russia)	4–0	(Bulgaria) Lyubimets	Spain
20:00 MSK (UTC+4)	Abdulavov 9'; Aliyev 62'; Serderov 72'; Bukharov 79'	Summary		Referee: Jose Perinho

== Competitions ==
=== Overview ===
Competition	First match	Last match	Starting round	Final position	Record							
Competition	First match	Last match	Starting round	Final position	Pld	W	D	L	GF	GA	GD	Win %
Premier League	14 July 2013	15 May 2014	Matchday 1	16th	30	3	11	16	25	42	−17	10.00
Russian Cup	31 October 2013	31 October 2013	Round of 32	Round of 32	1	0	0	1	0	1	−1	0.00
UEFA Europa League	19 September 2013	20 March 2014	Group Stage	Round of 16	10	3	4	3	6	8	−2	30.00
Total					41	6	15	20	31	51	−20	14.63

Last updated: 15 May 2014
Source: Competitions

=== Premier League ===
==== Results summary ====
Overall								Home						Away					
Pld	W	D	L	GF	GA	GD	Pts	W	D	L	GF	GA	GD	W	D	L	GF	GA	GD
30	3	11	16	25	42	−17	20	3	4	8	14	17	−3	0	7	8	11	25	−14

Last updated: 15 May 2014.
Source: See Results

==== Results by round ====
Round	1	2	3	4	5	6	7	8	9	10	11	12	13	14	15	16	17	18	19	20	21	22	23	24	25	26	27	28	29	30
Ground	H	A	A	H	A	H	A	A	A	A	H	A	H	A	H	A	H	H	H	H	A	H	A	H	A	H	A	H	A	H
Result	D	L	D	L	L	L	D	D	L	D	D	L	L	L	L	L	D	L	D	W	D	L	L	W	D	L	D	W	L	L
Position	8	12	12	13	15	15	15	14	14	15	16	16	16	16	16	16	16	16	16	16	16	16	16	16	16	16	16	16	16	16

Updated to match(es) played on 15 May 2014. Source: See Results
A = Away; H = Home; W = Win; D = Draw; L = Loss

==== Results ====
14 July 2013 1	Anzhi Makhachkala	2–2	Lokomotiv Moscow	Kaspiysk
18:30 MSK (UTC+4)	Tagirbekov (yellow card) 78'; Eto'o 79' (penalty missed) 90'; Traore 83'	Report	Yanbayev (yellow card) 24'; N'Doye 62'; Tarasov (yellow card) 74'; Pavlyuchenko 90'; Ćorluka (yellow card) 90+'; Guilherme (yellow card) 90+'	Stadium: Anzhi Arena; Attendance: 25,000; Referee: Vladislav Bezborodov

19 July 2013 2	Dynamo Moscow	2–1	Anzhi Makhachkala	Khimki
20:00 MSK (UTC+4)	Solomatin 26'; Wilkshire (yellow card) 81'; Voronin 90+6' (pen.)	Report	Ewerton (red card) 32'; Samba 83' (yellow card) 90+'; Eto'o (yellow card) 90+'; Gabulov (yellow card) 90+'	Stadium: Arena Khimki; Attendance: 9,382; Referee: Sergei Karasev

28 July 2013 3	Krylia Sovetov	1–1	Anzhi Makhachkala	Samara
18:30 MSK (UTC+4)	Angbwa (yellow card) 68'; Maksimov 82' (yellow card) 90'; Drahun (yellow card) 86'	Report	Boussoufa (yellow card) 36'; Eto'o 59'	Stadium: Metallurg Stadion; Attendance: 21,345; Referee: Timur Arslanbekov

2 August 2013 4	Anzhi Makhachkala	0–1	Rostov	Kaspiysk
20:00 MSK (UTC+4)	Ewerton (yellow card) 33'	Report	Kanga 53'; Milić (yellow card) 75'	Stadium: Anzhi Arena; Attendance: 21,000; Referee: Igor Fedotov

17 August 2013 5	Zenit St.Petersburg	3–0	Anzhi Makhachkala	Saint Petersburg
18:15 MSK (UTC+4)	Shirokov 25'; Hulk 43'; Smolnikov (yellow card) 56'; Ansaldi 73'	Report		Stadium: Petrovsky Stadium; Attendance: 19,150; Referee: Alexander Yegorov

24 August 2013 6	Anzhi Makhachkala	1–2	Krasnodar	Kaspiysk
21:00 MSK (UTC+4)	Ahmedov 45+2'; Ewerton (yellow card) 68'; Samba (yellow card) 87'; Traoré (yellow card) 90'	Report	Pereyra (yellow card) 45' (goal) 49'; Wánderson 74'; Mamayev (yellow card) 90+'	Stadium: Anzhi Arena; Attendance: 17,800; Referee: Sergey Lapochkin

31 August 2013 7	Terek Grozny	1–1	Anzhi Makhachkala	Grozny
18:45 MSK (UTC+4)	Sadayev (yellow card) 71'; Aílton 87' (pen.); Utsiyev (yellow card) 90'	Report	Ewerton 33' (yellow card) 64'; Solomatin (yellow card) 61'; Traoré (yellow card) 83'; Maksimov (yellow card) 90+1'	Stadium: Akhmat-Arena; Attendance: 16,700; Referee: Sergei Karasev

15 September 2013 8	Tom Tomsk	2–2	Anzhi Makhachkala	Tomsk
16:45 MSK (UTC+4)	Holenda 30'; Portnyagin 48' (pen.) (yellow card) 71'; Sorokin (yellow card) 90+2'	Report	Agalarov (yellow card) 16'; Epureanu (yellow card) 47'; Solomatin 53' (pen.); Burmistrov 64'	Stadium: Trud Stadium; Attendance: 5,300; Referee: Igor Nizovtsev

22 September 2013 9	Volga Nizhny Novgorod	2–1	Anzhi Makhachkala	Nizhny Novgorod
13:30 MSK (UTC+4)	Bibilov 11'; Putsila 21'; Kontsedalov (yellow card) 90+'	Report	Putsila 22' (o.g.); Serderov (yellow card) 73'; Gadzhibekov (yellow card) 90+'	Stadium: Lokomotiv Stadium; Attendance: 4,000; Referee: Vladimir Kazmenko

25 September 2013 10	CSKA Moscow	0–0	Anzhi Makhachkala	Moscow
20:30 MSK (UTC+4)		Report	Solomatin (yellow card) 81'; Razak (yellow card) 89'	Stadium: Eduard Streltsov Stadium; Attendance: 8,500; Referee: Vitali Meshkov
Note: The match was moved to the Eduard Streltsov Stadium, Moscow due to the poor quality of the pitch at Arena Khimki, Khimki.

29 September 2013 11	Anzhi Makhachkala	2–2	Amkar Perm	Kaspiysk
20:15 MSK (UTC+4)	Gatagov 44' (pen.) (yellow card) 45'; Solomatin 90'; Serderov (yellow card) 90+'	Report	Phibel (yellow card) 32'; Semyonov (yellow card) 43' (yellow-red card) 61'; Kanunnikov 65' (yellow card) 71'; Picusceac 88'	Stadium: Anzhi Arena; Attendance: 12,127; Referee: Timur Arslanbekov

6 October 2013 12	Rubin Kazan	5–1	Anzhi Makhachkala	Kazan
18:00 MSK (UTC+4)	Wakaso 11'; Ryazantsev 30'; Mukhametshin 70'; Azmoun 90+1'; Eremenko 90+3' (pen.)	Report	Adeleye (yellow card) 82'; Abdulavov 85' (yellow card) 89'; Ewerton (yellow card) 90+'	Stadium: Central Stadium; Attendance: 5,121; Referee: Aleksei Nikolaev

20 October 2013 13	Anzhi Makhachkala	0–1	Spartak Moscow	Kaspiysk
13:30 MSK (UTC+4)	Traoré (yellow card) 29'; Burmistrov (yellow card) 71'; Abdulavov (yellow card) 90+2'; Grigalava (yellow card) 90+3'	Report	Movsisyan 27'; K.Kombarov (yellow card) 41'; Carioca (yellow card) 71'; Parshivlyuk (yellow card) 79'; Barrios (yellow card) 90+3'	Stadium: Anzhi Arena; Attendance: 12,200; Referee: Sergey Ivanov

28 October 2013 14	Kuban Krasnodar	2–0	Anzhi Makhachkala	Krasnodar
19:00 MSK (UTC+4)	Bucur 14', 40' (yellow card) 39'	Report	Grigalava (yellow card) 49'	Stadium: Kuban Stadium; Attendance: 12,540; Referee: Alexander Yegorov

3 November 2013 15	Anzhi Makhachkala	0–1	Ural Sverdlovsk Oblast	Kaspiysk
20:15 MSK (UTC+4)		Report	Belozyorov (yellow card) 33'; Safronidi (yellow card) 90'; Acevedo 90+' (yellow card) 90+'	Stadium: Anzhi Arena; Attendance: 8,000; Referee: Vasiliy Kazartsev

10 November 2013 16	Amkar Perm	1–0	Anzhi Makhachkala	Perm
14:00 MSK (UTC+4)	Georgiev (yellow card) 29'; Sirakov (yellow card) 71'; Phibel (yellow card) 81'; Belorukov 82'	Report	Epureanu (yellow card) 22'; Serderov (yellow card) 31'	Stadium: Zvezda Stadium; Attendance: 9,700; Referee: Sergey Ivanov

24 November 2013 17	Anzhi Makhachkala	0–0	Volga Nizhny Novgorod	Kaspiysk
18:30 MSK (UTC+4)	Adeleye (yellow card) 39'; Solomatin (yellow card) 86'	Report	Aldonin (yellow card) 16'; Karyaka (yellow card) 56'; Rodić (yellow card) 75'; Putsila (yellow card) 84'	Stadium: Anzhi Arena; Attendance: 5,700; Referee: Igor Fedotov

2 December 2013 18	Anzhi Makhachkala	0–2	Tom Tomsk	Kaspiysk
17:00 MSK (UTC+4)	Maksimov (yellow card) 54'	Report	Mureșan (yellow card) 10'; Panchenko 42'; Bashkirov (yellow card) 58'; Komkov 74'; Vašek (yellow card) 76'	Stadium: Anzhi Arena; Attendance: 5,600; Referee: Sergei Karasev

7 December 2013 19	Anzhi Makhachkala	0–0	Kuban Krasnodar	Kaspiysk
16:00 MSK (UTC+4)	Maksimov (yellow card) 74' (penalty missed) 90+'	Report	Kaboré (yellow card) 54' (yellow-red card) 90+'; Armaș (yellow card) 75'; Bugayev (yellow card) 84' (yellow-red card) 90+'	Stadium: Anzhi Arena; Attendance: 4,400; Referee: Sergey Kuznetsov

9 March 2014 20	Anzhi Makhachkala	1–0	Rubin Kazan	Kaspiysk
16:00 (UTC+4)	Epureanu (yellow card) 31'; Aliyev (yellow card) 47'; Bukharov (yellow card) 48' (goal) 83'	Report	Kambolov (yellow card) 40'; Mullin (yellow card) 70'; Nabiullin (yellow card) 89'	Stadium: Anzhi Arena; Attendance: 18,700; Referee: Aleksei Eskov

17 March 2014 21	Spartak Moscow	2–2	Anzhi Makhachkala	Moscow
19:00 MSK (UTC+4)	Costa 20'; Jurado 23'; Movsisyan (yellow card) 59'; Makeyev (yellow card) 68'; Carioca (yellow card) 74'	Report	Smolov (yellow card) 26'; Epureanu (yellow card) 39' (goal) 52'; Mkrtchyan (yellow card) 85'; Serderov 90+5'	Stadium: Lokomotiv Stadium; Attendance: 12,200; Referee: Sergey Lapochkin

24 March 2014 22	Anzhi Makhachkala	0–3	CSKA Moscow	Kaspiysk
17:00 MSK (UTC+4)		Report	Doumbia 26', 51'; Fernandes (yellow card) 33'; Elm (yellow card) 62'; Milanov (yellow card) 65'; Musa 76'	Stadium: Anzhi Arena; Attendance: 18,200; Referee: Vitali Meshkov

29 March 2014 23	Ural Sverdlovsk Oblast	2–1	Anzhi Makhachkala	Yekaterinburg
13:30 MSK (UTC+4)	Gogniyev 10'; Yerokhin 40'; Ottesen (yellow card) 50'	Report	Epureanu (yellow card) 55' (goal) 85'	Stadium: Central Stadium; Attendance: 2,830; Referee: Aleksei Nikolaev

6 April 2014 24	Anzhi Makhachkala	4–0	Dynamo Moscow	Kaspiysk
16:00 MSK (UTC+4)	Bukharov 11'; Smolov 30'; Epureanu (yellow card) 58'; Serderov 66'; Gadzhiyev 82' (yellow card) 83'	Report	Samba (yellow card) 20'	Stadium: Anzhi Arena; Attendance: 12,980; Referee: Mikhail Vilkov

13 April 2014 25	Lokomotiv Moscow	0–0	Anzhi Makhachkala	Moscow
13:30 MSK (UTC+4)	Boussoufa (yellow card) 57'; N'Doye (yellow card) 90'	Report	Ahmedov (yellow card) 52'	Stadium: Lokomotiv Stadium; Attendance: 11,499; Referee: Alexander Yegorov

19 April 2014 26	Anzhi Makhachkala	1–2	Zenit St.Petersburg	Kaspiysk
18:00 MSK (UTC+4)	Smolov 29'; Grigalava (yellow card) 31'; Bukharov (yellow card) 39'; Bilyaletdinov (yellow card) 41'; Yeshchenko (yellow card) 89'	Report	Rondón 9'; Danny 62'; Hulk (yellow card) 72'; Criscito (yellow card) 89'	Stadium: Anzhi-Arena; Attendance: 21,200; Referee: Aleksei Nikolaev

27 April 2014 27	Rostov	1–1	Anzhi Makhachkala	Rostov-on-Don
16:00 MSK (UTC+4)	Dzyuba 22' (pen.) (yellow card) 31'; Gațcan (yellow card) 28' (yellow-red card) 61'; Pongolle (red card) 89'	Report	Bystrov (yellow card) 76'; Bilyaletdinov 80'	Stadium: Olimp-2; Attendance: 12,000; Referee: Sergey Lapochkin

4 May 2014 28	Anzhi Makhachkala	3–0	Terek Grozny	Kaspiysk
19:00 MSK (UTC+4)	Bystrov 6'; Grigalava 33'; Maksimov (yellow card) 47'; Gadzhibekov (yellow card) 52'; Bilyaletdinov 60'	Report	Komorowski (yellow card) 11'; Hodzyur (yellow card) 32'	Stadium: Anzhi Arena; Attendance: 11,150; Referee: Sergey Ivanov

11 May 2014 29	Krasnodar	1–0	Anzhi Makhachkala	Krasnodar
18:00 MSK (UTC+4)	Granqvist 6'; Sigurðsson (yellow card) 56'	Summary	Bukharov (yellow card) 28'; Yeshchenko (yellow card) 33'	Stadium: Kuban Stadium; Attendance: 9,300; Referee: Vladislav Bezborodov

15 May 2014 30	Anzhi Makhachkala	0–1	Krylia Sovetov	Kaspiysk
18:30 MSK (UTC+4)	Serderov (red card) 90+3'	Report	Delkin 58'	Stadium: Anzhi Arena; Attendance: 5,031; Referee: Aleksei Eskov

==== League table ====
Pos	Team	Pld	W	D	L	GF	GA	GD	Pts	Qualification or relegation
12	Terek Grozny	30	8	9	13	27	33	−6	33	
13	Tom Tomsk (R)	30	8	7	15	23	39	−16	31	Qualification for the Relegation play-offs
14	Krylia Sovetov Samara (R)	30	6	11	13	27	46	−19	29	Qualification for the Relegation play-offs
15	Volga Nizhny Novgorod (R)	30	6	3	21	22	65	−43	21	Relegation to Football National League
16	Anzhi Makhachkala (R)	30	3	11	16	25	42	−17	20	Relegation to Football National League

Source: Russian Premier League
Rules for classification: 1) points; 2) number of wins; 3) head-to-head points; 4) number of head-to-head wins; 5) head-to-head goal difference; 6) number of head-to-head goals scored; 7) number of head-to-head away goals scored; 8) goal difference; 9) number of goals scored; 10) number of away goals scored; 11) position in the 2012–13 season (only used until all the regularly scheduled games have been played); 11) extra play-off game or tournament between the teams in question.
(R) Relegated

=== Russian Cup ===
31 October 2013 Round of 32	Alania Vladikavkaz	1–0	Anzhi Makhachkala	Vladikavkaz
18:00 MSK (UTC+4)	Priskin (yellow card) 54'; Bakayev 77'	Report	Tagirbekov (yellow card) 54'; Ewerton (yellow card) 63'; Mukhammad (yellow card) 88'	Stadium: Republican Spartak Stadium; Attendance: 9,500; Referee: Igor Fedotov

=== UEFA Europa League ===
==== Group stage ====
Pos	Team	Pld	W	D	L	GF	GA	GD	Pts	Qualification
1	(England) Tottenham Hotspur	6	6	0	0	15	2	+13	18	Advance to knockout phase
2	(Russia) Anzhi Makhachkala	6	2	2	2	4	7	−3	8	Advance to knockout phase
3	(Moldova) Sheriff Tiraspol	6	1	3	2	5	6	−1	6	
4	(Norway) Tromsø	6	0	1	5	1	10	−9	1	

Source: Soccerway

19 September 2013 1	Sheriff Tiraspol (Moldova)	0–0	(Russia) Anzhi Makhachkala	Tiraspol, Moldova
23:05 MSK (UTC+4)	Paye (yellow card) 40'	Report	Agalarov (yellow card) 37'; Solomatin (yellow card) 85'; Adeleye (yellow card) 90'; Jucilei (yellow card) 90+4'	Stadium: Sheriff Stadium; Attendance: 8,882; Referee: Alan Kelly (Ireland)

3 October 2013 2	Anzhi Makhachkala (Russia)	0–2	(England) Tottenham Hotspur	Ramenskoye, Russia
20:00 MSK (UTC+4)		Report	Defoe 33'; Chadli 38'	Stadium: Saturn Stadium; Attendance: 5,662; Referee: Bülent Yıldırım (Turkey)
Note: Match played at the Saturn Stadium in Ramenskoye, instead of Anzhi's regular Anzhi Arena in Kaspiysk.

24 October 2013 3	Anzhi Makhachkala (Russia)	1–0	(Norway) Tromsø	Ramenskoye, Russia
20:00 MSK (UTC+4)	Burmistrov 19'; Jucilei (yellow card) 62'; Gatagov (yellow card) 90+5'	Report	Helmke (yellow card) 56'; K-A.Antonsen (yellow card) 90+1'	Stadium: Saturn Stadium; Attendance: 2,797; Referee: Gediminas Mažeika (Lithuania)
Note: Match played at the Saturn Stadium in Ramenskoye, instead of Anzhi's regular Anzhi Arena in Kaspiysk.

8 November 2013 4	Tromsø (Norway)	0–1	(Russia) Anzhi Makhachkala	Tromsø, Norway
00:05 MSK (UTC+4)	L.Johnsen (yellow card) 14'	Report	Epureanu (yellow card) 48'; Jucilei (yellow card) 68'; Grigalava (yellow card) 90+2'; Mkrtchyan 90+4'	Stadium: Alfheim Stadion; Attendance: 3,673; Referee: Danny Makkelie (Netherlands)

28 November 2013 5	Anzhi Makhachkala (Russia)	1–1	(Moldova) Sheriff Tiraspol	Ramenskoye, Russia
21:00 MSK (UTC+4)	Epureanu 58'; Ahmedov (yellow card) 66'; Agalarov (yellow card) 69'; Adeleye (yellow card) 85'	Report	Luvannor (yellow card) 46'; Isa 52' (yellow card) 53'; Ricardinho (yellow card) 89' (yellow-red card) 90+3'	Stadium: Saturn Stadium; Attendance: 2,760; Referee: Libor Kovařík (Czech Republic)
Note: Match played at the Saturn Stadium in Ramenskoye, instead of Anzhi's regular Anzhi Arena in Kaspiysk.

13 December 2013 6	Tottenham Hotspur (England)	4–1	(Russia) Anzhi Makhachkala	London, England
00:05 MSK (UTC+4)	Soldado 7', 16', 70' (pen.); Holtby (yellow card) 20' (goal) 54'; Naughton (yellow card) 88'	Report	Grigalava (yellow card) 34'; Ewerton 44'; Maksimov (yellow card) 52'	Stadium: White Hart Lane; Attendance: 23,101; Referee: Stefan Johannesson (Sweden)

==== Knockout phase ====
20 February 2014 Round of 32 1st leg	Anzhi Makhachkala (Russia)	0–0	(Belgium) Genk	Ramenskoye, Russia
21:00 MSK (UTC+4)	Gadzhibekov (yellow card) 73'; Maksimov (red card) 89'	Report	Koulibaly (yellow card) 29'; Mboyo (yellow card) 73'	Stadium: Saturn Stadium; Attendance: 3,168; Referee: Alon Yefet (Israel)
Note: Match played at the Saturn Stadium in Ramenskoye, instead of Anzhi's regular Anzhi Arena in Kaspiysk.

28 February 2014 Round of 32 2nd leg	Genk (Belgium)	0–2 (0–2 agg.)	(Russia) Anzhi Makhachkala	Genk, Belgium
00:05 MSK (UTC+4)	Gorius (yellow card) 2'; Vossen (yellow card) 22'; Mbodji (yellow card) 55'; De Ceulaer (yellow card) 74'; Camus (yellow card) 86'	Report	Grigalava (yellow card) 29'; Tshimanga 64' (o.g.); Aliyev 71'; Tagirbekov (red card) 81'	Stadium: Cristal Arena; Attendance: 10,176; Referee: Manuel Gräfe (Germany)

14 March 2014 Round of 16 1st leg	AZ (Netherlands)	1–0	(Russia) Anzhi Makhachkala	Alkmaar, Netherlands
00:05 MSK (UTC+4)	Jóhannsson 29' (pen.); Gouweleeuw (yellow card) 34'; Wuytens (yellow card) 58'	Report	Ewerton (yellow card) 20'; Ahmedov (yellow card) 66'; Epureanu (yellow card) 74'	Stadium: AFAS Stadion; Attendance: 9,653; Referee: Daniele Orsato (Italy)

20 March 2014 Round of 16 2nd leg	Anzhi Makhachkala (Russia)	0–0 (0–1 agg.)	(Netherlands) AZ	Ramenskoye, Russia
21:00 MSK (UTC+4)	Grigalava (yellow card) 43'; Sobolev (yellow card) 69'; Agalarov (yellow card) 81'; Aliyev (yellow card) 85'; Mkrtchyan (red card) 90+3'	Report	Wuytens (yellow card) 62'	Stadium: Saturn Stadium; Attendance: 3,896; Referee: Craig Thomson (Scotland)
Note: Match played at the Saturn Stadium in Ramenskoye, instead of Anzhi's regular Anzhi Arena in Kaspiysk.

== Squad statistics ==
As of match played 15 May 2014

=== Appearances and goals ===
No.	Pos	Nat	Player	Total		Premier League		Russian Cup		Europa League	
No.	Pos	Nat	Player	Apps	Goals	Apps	Goals	Apps	Goals	Apps	Goals
1	GK	(Russia) RUS	Yevgeny Pomazan	6	0	2	0	1	0	3	0
2	DF	(Russia) RUS	Andrey Yeshchenko	24	0	16	0	0	0	5+3	0
3	DF	(Russia) RUS	Ali Gadzhibekov	35	0	26+1	0	1	0	5+2	0
4	DF	(Cameroon) CMR	Benoît Angbwa	17	0	8+1	0	1	0	5+2	0
5	DF	(Georgia (country)) GEO	Gia Grigalava	29	1	21+1	1	0	0	6+1	0
6	DF	(Moldova) MDA	Alexandru Epureanu	26	3	15+2	2	1	0	8	1
7	DF	(Russia) RUS	Kamil Agalarov	19	0	10+2	0	0+1	0	4+2	0
8	MF	(Ukraine) UKR	Oleksandr Aliyev	11	1	5+2	0	0	0	4	1
10	FW	(Russia) RUS	Fyodor Smolov	14	2	9+1	2	0	0	4	0
13	DF	(Russia) RUS	Rasim Tagirbekov	12	0	7+1	0	1	0	3	0
15	MF	(Russia) RUS	Diniyar Bilyaletdinov	11	1	8+3	1	0	0	0	0
16	MF	(Armenia) ARM	Karlen Mkrtchyan	18	1	10+3	0	0	0	4+1	1
17	MF	(Russia) RUS	Sharif Mukhammad	4	0	1+2	0	1	0	0	0
20	MF	(Russia) RUS	Vladimir Sobolev	14	0	4+5	0	1	0	3+1	0
22	GK	(Russia) RUS	Mikhail Kerzhakov	30	0	23	0	0	0	7	0
25	MF	(Uzbekistan) UZB	Odil Ahmedov	34	1	24+2	1	0	0	7+1	0
28	FW	(Russia) RUS	Serder Serderov	29	2	4+17	2	1	0	3+4	0
30	FW	(Russia) RUS	Aleksandr Bukharov	13	2	8+1	2	0	0	4	0
34	MF	(Russia) RUS	Vladimir Bystrov	11	1	7+4	1	0	0	0	0
37	DF	(Brazil) BRA	Ewerton	20	2	9+3	1	1	0	6+1	1
81	FW	(Russia) RUS	Nikita Burmistrov	19	2	11+2	1	0	0	5+1	1
87	MF	(Russia) RUS	Ilya Maksimov	15	0	11+1	0	0	0	3	0
91	MF	(Russia) RUS	Makhach Gadzhiyev	5	1	1+4	1	0	0	0	0
99	FW	(Russia) RUS	Islamnur Abdulavov	15	1	1+8	1	0	0	2+4	0
Players away from the club on loan:
Players who appeared for Anzhi Makhachkala no longer at the club:
1	GK	(Russia) RUS	Vladimir Gabulov	5	0	5	0	0	0	0	0
4	DF	(Republic of the Congo) CGO	Christopher Samba	5	1	4+1	1	0	0	0	0
5	DF	(Brazil) BRA	João Carlos	4	0	4	0	0	0	0	0
6	MF	(Morocco) MAR	Mbark Boussoufa	4	0	3+1	0	0	0	0	0
7	MF	(Russia) RUS	Igor Denisov	3	0	3	0	0	0	0	0
8	MF	(Brazil) BRA	Jucilei	24	0	18+1	0	0	0	5	0
9	FW	(Cameroon) CMR	Samuel Eto'o	6	2	6	2	0	0	0	0
10	FW	(Brazil) BRA	Willian	4	0	4	0	0	0	0	0
10	MF	(Russia) RUS	Alan Gatagov	12	1	4+3	1	1	0	2+2	0
14	MF	(Russia) RUS	Oleg Shatov	2	0	1+1	0	0	0	0	0
14	FW	(Russia) RUS	Pavel Solomatin	17	2	8+3	2	0+1	0	3+2	0
15	DF	(Russia) RUS	Arseny Logashov	2	0	2	0	0	0	0	0
15	DF	(Norway) NOR	Vadim Demidov	2	0	0	0	1	0	1	0
19	FW	(Ivory Coast) CIV	Lacina Traoré	7	1	3+2	1	0	0	1+1	0
21	MF	(Russia) RUS	Aleksei Ionov	6	0	5+1	0	0	0	0	0
24	DF	(Nigeria) NGR	Dele Adeleye	13	0	9	0	0	0	4	0
29	MF	(Ivory Coast) CIV	Abdul Razak	11	0	4+3	0	0	0	4	0
33	MF	(Morocco) MAR	Mehdi Carcela	3	0	1+2	0	0	0	0	0
85	MF	(France) FRA	Lassana Diarra	4	0	4	0	0	0	0	0

=== Goal scorers ===
Place	Position	Nation	Number	Name	Premier League	Russian Cup	UEFA Europa League	Total
1	DF	(Moldova)	6	Alexandru Epureanu	2	0	1	3
2	FW	(Cameroon)	9	Samuel Eto'o	2	0	0	2
2	FW	(Russia)	14	Pavel Solomatin	2	0	0	2
2	FW	(Russia)	30	Aleksandr Bukharov	2	0	0	2
2	FW	(Russia)	28	Serder Serderov	2	0	0	2
2	FW	(Russia)	10	Fyodor Smolov	2	0	0	2
2	MF	(Russia)	15	Diniyar Bilyaletdinov	2	0	0	2
2	FW	(Russia)	81	Nikita Burmistrov	1	0	1	2
2	DF	(Brazil)	37	Ewerton	1	0	1	2
2				Own goal	1	0	1	2
11	FW	(Ivory Coast)	19	Lacina Traoré	1	0	0	1
11	DF	(Republic of the Congo)	4	Christopher Samba	1	0	0	1
11	MF	(Uzbekistan)	25	Odil Ahmedov	1	0	0	1
11	MF	(Russia)	10	Alan Gatagov	1	0	0	1
11	FW	(Russia)	99	Islamnur Abdulavov	1	0	0	1
11	MF	(Russia)	91	Makhach Gadzhiyev	1	0	0	1
11	MF	(Russia)	34	Vladimir Bystrov	1	0	0	1
11	DF	(Georgia (country))	5	Gia Grigalava	1	0	0	1
11	MF	(Armenia)	16	Karlen Mkrtchyan	0	0	1	1
11	MF	(Ukraine)	8	Oleksandr Aliyev	0	0	1	1
				TOTALS	25	0	6	31

=== Clean sheets ===
Place	Position	Nation	Number	Name	Premier League	Russian Cup	UEFA Europa League	Total
1	GK	(Russia)	22	Mikhail Kerzhakov	7	0	5	12
2	GK	(Russia)	1	Yevgeny Pomazan	0	0	1	1
				TOTALS	7	0	6	13

=== Disciplinary record ===
Number	Nation	Position	Name	Premier League		Russian Cup		UEFA Europa League		Total	
Number	Nation	Position	Name	Yellow card	Red card	Yellow card	Red card	Yellow card	Red card	Yellow card	Red card
2	(Russia)	DF	Andrey Yeshchenko	2	0	0	0	0	0	2	0
3	(Russia)	DF	Ali Gadzhibekov	2	0	0	0	1	0	3	0
5	(Georgia (country))	DF	Gia Grigalava	2	0	0	0	4	0	6	0
6	(Moldova)	DF	Alexandru Epureanu	5	0	0	0	1	0	6	0
7	(Russia)	DF	Kamil Agalarov	1	0	0	0	3	0	4	0
8	(Ukraine)	MF	Oleksandr Aliyev	1	0	0	0	1	0	2	0
10	(Russia)	FW	Fyodor Smolov	1	0	0	0	0	0	1	0
13	(Russia)	DF	Rasim Tagirbekov	1	0	1	0	0	1	2	1
15	(Russia)	MF	Diniyar Bilyaletdinov	1	0	0	0	0	0	1	0
16	(Armenia)	MF	Karlen Mkrtchyan	1	0	0	0	0	1	1	1
17	(Russia)	MF	Sharif Mukhammad	0	0	1	0	0	0	1	0
20	(Russia)	MF	Vladimir Sobolev	0	0	0	0	2	0	2	0
25	(Uzbekistan)	MF	Odil Ahmedov	1	0	0	0	2	0	3	0
28	(Russia)	FW	Serder Serderov	3	1	0	0	0	0	3	1
30	(Russia)	FW	Aleksandr Bukharov	3	0	0	0	0	0	3	0
34	(Russia)	MF	Vladimir Bystrov	1	0	0	0	0	0	1	0
37	(Brazil)	DF	Ewerton	4	1	1	0	1	0	6	1
81	(Russia)	FW	Nikita Burmistrov	1	0	0	0	0	0	1	0
87	(Russia)	MF	Ilya Maksimov	4	0	0	0	1	1	5	1
91	(Russia)	MF	Makhach Gadzhiyev	1	0	0	0	0	0	1	0
99	(Russia)	FW	Islamnur Abdulavov	3	0	0	0	0	0	3	0
Players away on loan:
Players who left Anzhi Makhachkala during the season:
4	(Republic of the Congo)	DF	Christopher Samba	1	0	0	0	0	0	1	0
6	(Morocco)	MF	Mbark Boussoufa	2	0	0	0	1	0	3	0
8	(Brazil)	MF	Jucilei	0	0	0	0	3	0	3	0
9	(Cameroon)	FW	Samuel Eto'o	1	0	0	0	0	0	1	0
10	(Russia)	MF	Alan Gatagov	1	0	0	0	1	0	2	0
14	(Russia)	FW	Pavel Solomatin	3	0	0	0	1	0	4	0
19	(Ivory Coast)	FW	Lacina Traoré	3	0	0	0	0	0	3	0
24	(Nigeria)	DF	Dele Adeleye	2	0	0	0	2	0	4	0
29	(Ivory Coast)	MF	Abdul Razak	1	0	0	0	0	0	1	0
			TOTALS	52	2	3	0	24	3	79	5
