= Oleksandr Aliyev =

Ukrainian footballer (born 1985)

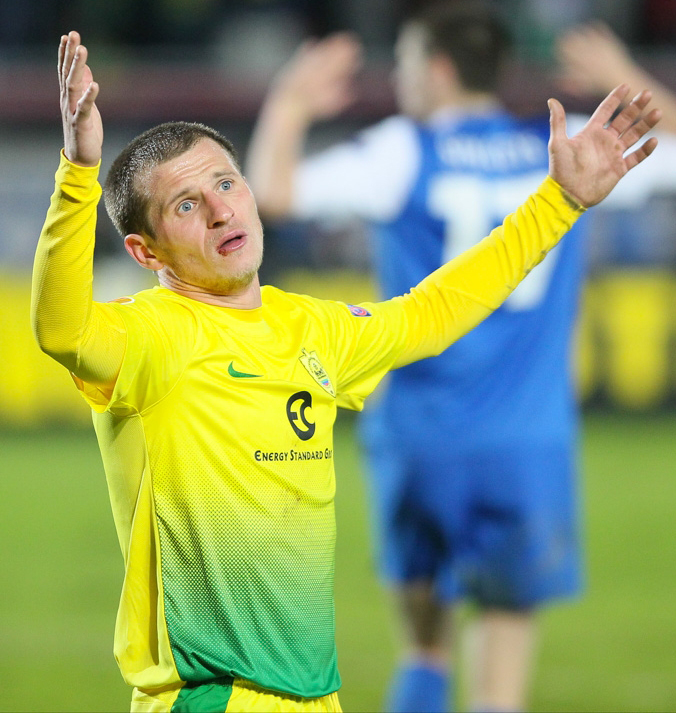
- Aliyev in 2014

Personal information
- Full name: Oleksandr Oleksandrovych Aliyev
- Date of birth: 3 February 1985 (age 41)
- Place of birth: Khabarovsk, Soviet Union (now Russia)
- Height: 1.73 m (5 ft 8 in)
- Position: Midfielder

Youth career
- SKA Khabarovsk
- 1998–1999: Spartak Moscow
- 1999–2001: Dynamo Kyiv
- 2000–2001: Obukhiv

Senior career*
Years	Team	Apps	(Gls)
2001–2002	Borysfen-2 Boryspil	10	(4)
2002–2010	Dynamo Kyiv	51	(17)
2002–2008	→ Dynamo-2 Kyiv	99	(53)
2005–2006	→ Metalurh Zaporizhzhia (loan)	8	(1)
2010–2011	Lokomotiv Moscow	25	(14)
2011–2013	Dynamo Kyiv	35	(7)
2012–2013	→ Dnipro Dnipropetrovsk (loan)	12	(2)
2014–2015	Anzhi Makhachkala	22	(3)
2015	Rukh Vynnyky (amateurs)	23	(11)
2016	Katanzaro Kyiv (amateurs)		
2016	Taraz	9	(1)
2017	Katanzaro Kyiv (amateurs)		
2018	Khmelnytskyi (amateurs)	4	(0)
2018	Meliorator Bucha (amateurs)		
2019–2020	Juniors Shyptky (amateurs)	5	(0)

International career
2001–2002	Ukraine U17	8	(5)
2003–2006	Ukraine U21	30	(8)
2008–2012	Ukraine	28	(6)

Managerial career
- 2018: Khmelnytskyi (amateurs) (player-manager)
- 2018: Meliorator Bucha (amateurs) (player-manager)
Medal record
Men's football
Representing Ukraine
UEFA European Under-19 Championship
Bronze medal – third place	2004 Switzerland
UEFA European Under-21 Championship
Runner-up	2006 Portugal
- * Club domestic league appearances and goals

Oleksandr Oleksandrovych Aliyev (Ukrainian: Олександр Олександрович Алієв, Russian: Александр Александрович Алиев; born 3 February 1985) is a Ukrainian former professional footballer who played as a midfielder.

Debuting at professional level for Dynamo Kyiv in 2002 at the age of 17 years and 6 months, Aliyev was known for his spectacular goals from direct free kicks. His former coach at Dynamo, Yuri Syomin, described him as "...the best free kick taker in Europe".

During the 2022 Russian invasion of Ukraine, Aliyev joined the Ukrainian army.

== Club career ==
Born in Khabarovsk, Russia, Aliyev began playing football as a child with FC Zaria Khabarovsk before entering the Dynamo Kyiv youth system.

=== Dynamo Kyiv ===
Aliyev began his career in Borysfen-2 Boryspil (a second team of FC Borysfen Boryspil) in Druha Liha A. It was a youth club that was participating on the professional level similar to FC Dynamo-3 Kyiv and Aliyev at that time was a minor (underage). In 2002, he joined Dynamo Kyiv where he was featured mostly in FC Dynamo-2 Kyiv in the Ukrainian First League. He was really successful in the Dynamo-2 so he was loaned of to Ukrainian Premier League side Metalurh Zaporizhzhia. With Zaporizhzhia, he managed to get to the Ukrainian Cup finals.

After his loan ended, Aliyev was promoted to the main team of Dynamo, where he began to shine especially under new Russian head coach Yuri Semin during the 2008–09 season. In September 2008 Ukraine legend Serhii Rebrov hailed Aliyev's transformation into a "team player", when he thought "Aliyev was just about fun". He was key in Dynamo's campaign in the 2008–09 UEFA Champions League. On 21 October 2008, he scored a free kick from at least 30 yards out to give Dynamo Kyiv the win against FC Porto. On 25 November, at the end of the game against Arsenal, Aliyev pushed the referee, Alain Hamer, and received a red card for his action. Later, during the interview he called Hamer a "kozel" (the goat -eng.) which means similarly to "idiot" in this context. Dynamo Kyiv finished third in their Champions League group, moving down to the 2008–09 UEFA Cup after the winter break. Aliyev was an instrumental player throughout the campaign here too. He played in most of the games, helping Dynamo get to the semi-finals, where they were eliminated by fellow Ukrainian rivals, and eventual UEFA Cup Champions Shakhtar Donetsk. Dynamo also won the 2008–09 Ukrainian Premier League that season. Later in 2009–10 season he was a part of starting lineup for Ukrainian Super Cup match against Vorskla Poltava. After a few minutes in that game he got injured and missed few months of the starting season. On recovery Aliyev was not able to secure a starting position and asked for a transfer during the winter break.

=== Lokomotiv Moscow ===
As soon as the first half of 2009–10 Ukrainian Premier League Aliyev began negotiations with Lokomotiv Moscow in the Russian Premier League. These negotiations failed and Aliyev remained a Dynamo player until 1 February 2010, when Lokomotiv officially announced the signing of Aliyev to a three-year contract.

=== Anzhi Makhachkala ===
In January 2014 Aliyev moved from Dynamo Kyiv to Anzhi Makhachkala on a 2.5-year contract. Aliyev left Anzhi at the end of the 2013–14 season by mutual consent. Shortly thereafter, he re-signed with Anzhi, before having his contract terminated by mutual consent once again in January 2015.

=== Rukh Vynnyky and amateurs ===
In 2015 Aliyev returned to Ukraine playing for FC Rukh Vynnyky along with his former teammate Maksim Shatskikh at the 2015 Ukrainian Football Amateur League.

In 2016 and 2017 he was taking part at the Kyiv city championship for local amateur club.

=== Taraz ===
In June 2016, after eighteen-months without a professional club, Aliyev signed for FC Taraz of the Kazakhstan Premier League until the end of the 2016 season. Aliyev left Taraz prior to the expiration of his contract on 6 October 2016.

== International career ==
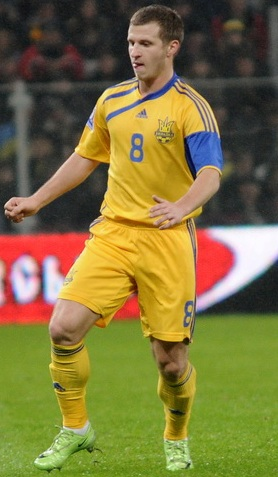
Aliyev playing for Ukraine in 2009.

Aliyev played the under-20 2005 FIFA World Youth Championship in Netherlands. He was one of the top scorers of the tournament with five goals, one less than Lionel Messi, the top scorer. Aliyev also played in the Ukraine national under-21 football team in the 2006 UEFA European Under-21 Football Championship, helping his side reach the final. He scored a spectacular set piece goal from more than 40 yards that hit the cross-bar and went in against Turkey in the U-21 Championship. He is the current top goalscorer of the Ukrainian under-21 team with eight goals.

Between 2008 and 2012, Aliyev earned 28 senior caps for Ukraine.

== Coaching career ==
In March 2018 Aliyev became a manager of Ukrainian amateur club FC Khmelnytskyi which earlier in 2017 started out at the 2017–18 Ukrainian Football Amateur League.

== Career statistics ==
=== Club ===
included only games played at professional level and might not correspond to the actual record of Football Federation of Ukraine

Appearances and goals by club, season and competition
Club	Season	League			National cup		Continental		Other		Total	
Club	Season	Division	Apps	Goals	Apps	Goals	Apps	Goals	Apps	Goals	Apps	Goals
Borysfen Boryspil-2	2001–02	Ukrainian Second League	10	4	0	0	–		–		10	4
Dynamo Kyiv	2002–03	Vyshcha Liha	2	0	2	0	0	0	0	0	4	0
Dynamo Kyiv	2003–04	Vyshcha Liha	2	0	1	0	0	0	0	0	3	0
Dynamo Kyiv	2004–05	Vyshcha Liha	0	0	0	0	0	0	0	0	0	0
Dynamo Kyiv	2005–06	Vyshcha Liha	5	1	3	1	1	0	1	0	10	2
Dynamo Kyiv	2006–07	Vyshcha Liha	3	0	2	0	1	0	0	0	6	0
Dynamo Kyiv	2007–08	Vyshcha Liha	10	3	3	1	0	0	1	0	14	4
Dynamo Kyiv	2008–09	Ukrainian Premier League	26	13	1	0	16	4	1	0	44	17
Dynamo Kyiv	2009–10	Ukrainian Premier League	3	0	1	0	1	0	1	0	6	0
Dynamo Kyiv	Total		51	17	13	2	19	4	4	0	87	23
Metalurh Zaporizhzhia (loan)	2005–06	Vyshcha Liha	8	1	3	1	–		–		11	2
Lokomotiv Moscow	2010	Russian Premier League	25	14	0	0	2	1	–		27	15
Dynamo Kyiv	2010–11	Ukrainian Premier League	6	2	2	0	0	0	0	0	8	2
Dynamo Kyiv	2011–12	Ukrainian Premier League	26	5	1	0	9	0	1	0	37	5
Dynamo Kyiv	2012–13	Ukrainian Premier League	3	0	0	0	0	0	0	0	3	0
Dynamo Kyiv	Total		35	7	3	0	9	0	1	0	48	7
Dnipro Dnipropetrovsk (loan)	2012–13	Ukrainian Premier League	12	2	1	0	5	2	–		18	4
Anzhi Makhachkala	2013–14	Russian Premier League	7	0	0	0	4	1	–		11	1
Anzhi Makhachkala	2014–15	Russian Football National League	15	3	1	0	–		–		16	3
Anzhi Makhachkala	Total		22	3	1	0	4	1	-	-	27	4
Taraz	2016	Kazakhstan Premier League	9	1	0	0	–		0	0	9	1
Career total			172	49	21	3	39	8	5	0	237	60

=== International ===
Appearances and goals by national team and year
National team	Year	Apps	Goals
Ukraine	2008	4	0
Ukraine	2009	5	0
Ukraine	2010	8	5
Ukraine	2011	7	1
Ukraine	2012	4	0
Total		28	6

Scores and results list Ukraine's goal tally first, score column indicates score after each Aliyev goal.

List of international goals scored by Oleksandr Aliyev
No.	Date	Venue	Opponent	Score	Result	Competition
1	25 May 2010	Kharkiv, Ukraine	Lithuania	1–0	4–0	Friendly
2	25 May 2010	Kharkiv, Ukraine	Lithuania	2–0	4–0	Friendly
3	29 May 2010	Lviv, Ukraine	Romania	1–0	3–2	Friendly
4	11 August 2010	Donetsk, Ukraine	Netherlands	1–1	1–1	Friendly
5	7 September 2010	Kyiv, Ukraine	Chile	2–0	2–1	Friendly
6	11 October 2011	Tallinn, Estonia	Estonia	2–0	2–0	Friendly

== Honours ==
Dynamo Kyiv

- Ukrainian Premier League: 2002–03, 2003–04, 2006–07, 2008–09
- Ukrainian Cup: 2002–03, 2004–05, 2005–06, 2006–07
- Ukrainian Super Cup: 2004, 2006, 2007, 2009

Ukraine U21

- UEFA Under-21 Championship: runner-up 2006

Individual

- Top assist provider of the Ukraine Premier League: 2008–09
- 2005 FIFA World Youth Championship: Silver Shoe
