= Aleksandr Kokorin =

Russian footballer (born 1991)

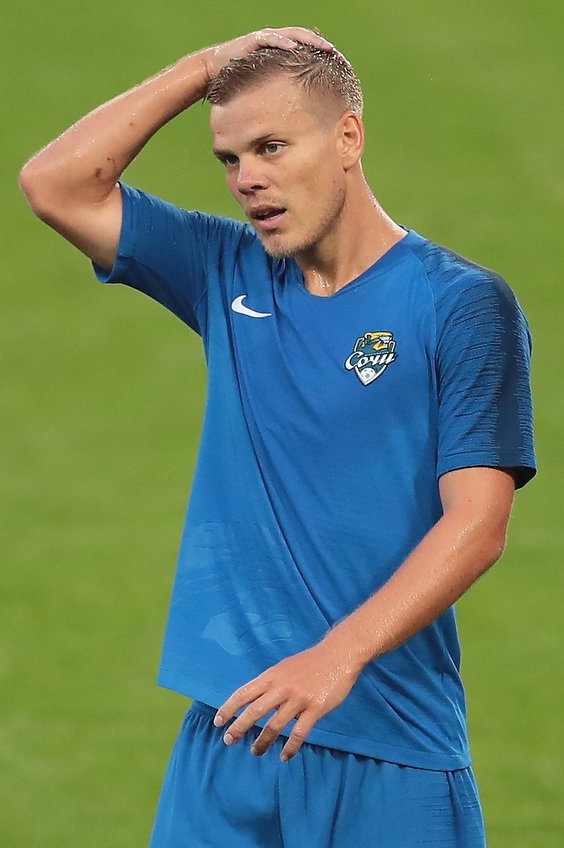
- Kokorin with Sochi in 2020

Personal information
- Full name: Aleksandr Aleksandrovich Kokorin
- Date of birth: 19 March 1991 (age 35)
- Place of birth: Valuyki, Soviet Union
- Height: 1.84 m (6 ft 0 in)
- Position: Forward

Youth career
- 2000–2008: Lokomotiv Moscow

Senior career*
| Years | Team | Apps | (Gls) |
| 2008–2013 | Dynamo Moscow | 114 | (19) |
| 2013 | Anzhi Makhachkala | 0 | (0) |
| 2013–2016 | Dynamo Moscow | 57 | (22) |
| 2016–2019 | Zenit Saint Petersburg | 62 | (17) |
| 2020 | Zenit Saint Petersburg | 0 | (0) |
| 2020 | → Sochi (loan) | 10 | (7) |
| 2020–2021 | Spartak Moscow | 8 | (2) |
| 2021–2024 | Fiorentina | 10 | (0) |
| 2022–2023 | → Aris Limassol (loan) | 29 | (13) |
| 2023–2024 | → Aris Limassol (loan) | 24 | (7) |
| 2024–2026 | Aris Limassol | 46 | (11) |
| Total | | 360 | (98) |

International career^{‡}
| 2008 | Russia U17 | 10 | (9) |
| 2010 | Russia U19 | 3 | (2) |
| 2009–2011 | Russia U21 | 17 | (8) |
| 2011–2017 | Russia | 48 | (12) |
- * Club domestic league appearances and goals as of 23 May 2026 ‡ National team caps and goals as of 14 November 2017

Aleksandr Aleksandrovich Kokorin (né Kartashov; Russian: Алекса́ндр Алекса́ндрович Коко́рин, pronounced [ɐlʲɪˈksandr ɐlʲɪˈksandrəvʲɪtɕ kɐˈkorʲɪn]; born 19 March 1991) is a Russian former professional footballer who played as a forward.

Kokorin had his breakthrough season in 2012–13, which led to Dynamo Moscow inserting a €19 million release clause into his contract. A full international since 2011, Kokorin has gained over 45 caps and was named in the Russian squads for Euro 2012, 2014 FIFA World Cup and Euro 2016.

In October 2018, he was arrested on an assault-related charge. He was later found guilty and spent approximately one year in prison.

== Club career ==
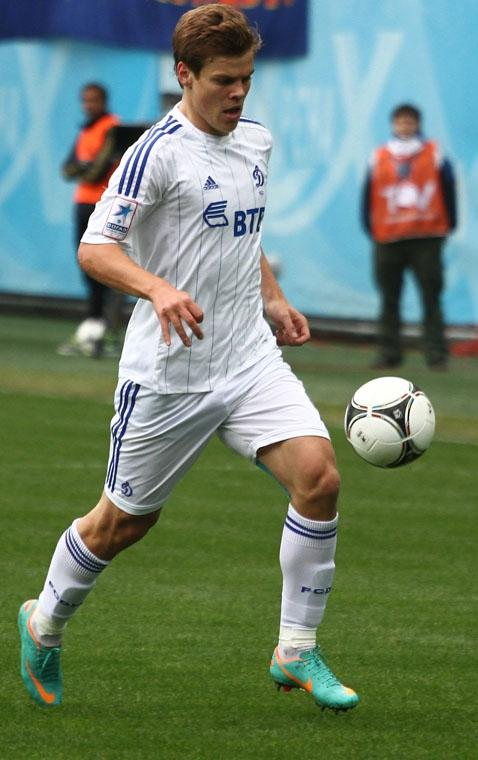
Kokorin with Dynamo Moscow in 2012

Kokorin made his debut for the senior FC Dynamo Moscow team on 4 October 2008 – Dynamo was decimated by injuries and was losing to FC Saturn Moscow Oblast 0–1 at the halftime when Kokorin came on as a substitute. With 18 minutes to go Kokorin scored an equalizer (Dynamo went on to win 2–1). He became the youngest player to score a goal for Dynamo in the Russian Premier League (17 years 199 days). He scored a winning goal in a 1–0 victory over FC Lokomotiv Moscow in his second game as a starter on 3 November 2008.

On 29 July 2009, he scored the winning goal in a 1–0 win against Celtic in the first leg of their third qualifying round tie in the UEFA Champions League in Glasgow.

At the end of the 2012–13 season he entered the Top 33 players list as the No. 1 Left Striker.

On 4 July 2013, Kokorin agreed personal terms with Anzhi Makhachkala after the club had triggered his €19 million release clause. He was officially signed by Anzhi and registered with the league as an Anzhi player. However, before he could play a single official game for Anzhi (he was out of commission due to injury at the time of his signing), on 6 August, following restructuring of Anzhi at business level, the whole squad was put up for sale, including new signing Kokorin. The next day, Yuri Zhirkov, Igor Denisov and Kokorin were all transferred to Dynamo for an undisclosed fee.

=== Zenit Saint Petersburg ===
On 30 January 2016, he moved from Dynamo to FC Zenit Saint Petersburg.

On 9 April 2016, Kokorin scored his first goal for Zenit in a game against FC Amkar Perm.

According to his lawyer Yuri Padalko, following his release from penal colony on 17 September 2019, he signed a new contract with Zenit until the end of the 2019–20 season.

=== Sochi ===
On 21 January 2020, Russian Premier League club PFC Sochi announced that Kokorin will join them on loan until the end of the 2019–20 season. He initially refused to report and was moved to Zenit-2. He eventually agreed to the loan and it was confirmed by Zenit on 17 February 2020.

On 19 June 2020, Kokorin scored a hat-trick in the first match back following the suspension of the Premier League due to COVID-19 pandemic. The match was a notable 10–1 victory over FC Rostov. Rostov were forced to play their youth side though after their senior and reserve sides, 43 players in total, were forced to quarantine.

=== Spartak Moscow ===
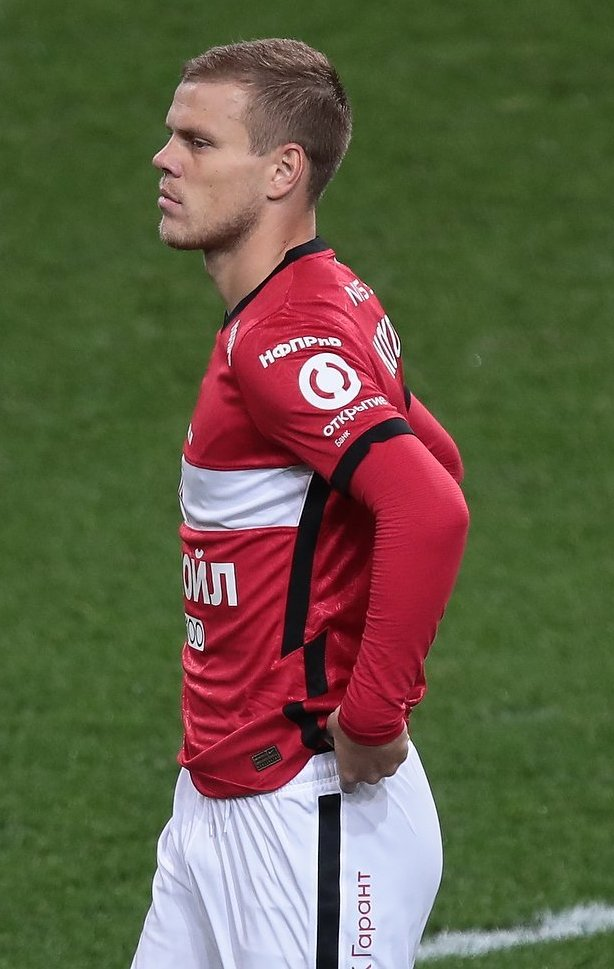
Kokorin with Spartak Moscow in 2020

On 2 August 2020, Spartak Moscow announced the signing of Kokorin to a three-year contract, with the option of an additional year, after his Zenit St.Petersburg contract had expired.

=== Fiorentina ===
On 21 January 2021, Spartak announced that they had reached an agreement with Serie A club Fiorentina on Kokorin's transfer. On 27 January 2021, Fiorentina confirmed that the club signed a contract with Kokorin. He became the second Russian to sign for the club, the first being Andrei Kanchelskis in 1997.

In August 2022, he was loaned to Aris Limassol. He helped the club win their first ever Cypriot First Division championship, and was voted as the most valuable player of the Cypriot season. In September 2023, he returned to Aris on loan for another year.

He ended his professional career in 2026.

== International career ==
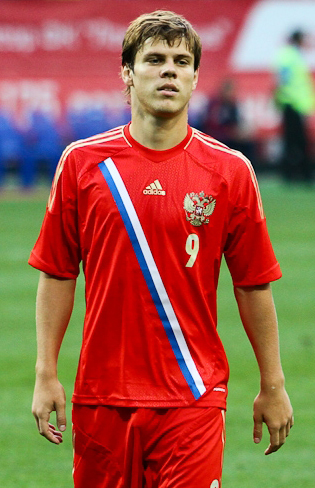
Kokorin with the Russia national team in 2012

Kokorin was a part of the Russia U-21 side that was competing in the 2011 European Under-21 Championship qualification. Kokorin was called up to the Russia national football team for a friendly against Greece in November 2011 and made his national team debut in that game on the 11th, a 1–1 draw in Piraeus. He played two games at UEFA Euro 2012 as Russia failed to pass the group stages.

He scored his first national team goal on 11 September 2012 in a 2014 FIFA World Cup qualifier against Israel, which finished as a 4–0 victory at the Ramat Gan Stadium.

On 2 June 2014, he was included in Russia's 2014 FIFA World Cup squad. He scored Russia's goal in their 1–1 final group match draw with Algeria, as the team was knocked out by the North African side.

Kokorin scored three times in Russia's successful UEFA Euro 2016 qualifying, concluding on 12 October 2015 with a penalty in their last game, a 2–0 win over Montenegro at the Otkrytie Arena which sealed Russia's place at the expense of Sweden. He was selected in Russia's squad for Euro 2016, playing in all three matches as Russia finished bottom of the group.

On 15 March 2018, he suffered an ACL tear in a Europa League game against RB Leipzig and missed the 2018 FIFA World Cup as a result.

== Personal life ==
He was born as Aleksandr Kartashov and changed his surname later, in honour of his mother Maria Kokorina following her divorce from his biological father.

On 7 October 2018, Kokorin and Krasnodar midfielder Pavel Mamayev assaulted a Russian government official in a restaurant. The football players struck the official with a chair and used racial slurs. Kokorin and Mamayev were caught on camera hitting the official in a cafe in Moscow, according to Gazeta. It quotes a Russian lawyer saying that a conviction such as this would carry a maximum sentence of five years. Hours before that incident, Mamayev, Kokorin and other young people were involved in an altercation with the driver of a Channel One show presenter; he received brain damage, nose fracture and face contusions after numerous punches. Kokorin was apprehended for two months. Kokorin remained in prison until his trial which began on 9 April 2019. On 8 May 2019, he was sentenced to one year and six months in penal colony. Considering the time he spent in pre-trial detention, the latest possible date for his release from custody was considered to be 14 December 2019. He was paroled on 17 September 2019.

== Career statistics ==
=== Club ===
As of match played 23 May 2026

Appearances and goals by club, season and competition
| Club | Season | League | | | National cup (Note: Includes Russian Cup, Coppa Italia, Cypriot Cup) | | Europe | | Other | | Total | |
| Club | Season | Division | Apps | Goals | Apps | Goals | Apps | Goals | Apps | Goals | Apps | Goals |
|---|---|---|---|---|---|---|---|---|---|---|---|---|
| Dynamo Moscow | 2008 | Russian Premier League | 7 | 2 | 0 | 0 | — | | — | | 7 | 2 |
| Dynamo Moscow | 2009 | Russian Premier League | 24 | 2 | 3 | 0 | 4 (Note: Includes two appearances and one goal in UEFA Champions League and two appearances in UEFA Europa League) | 1 | — | | 31 | 3 |
| Dynamo Moscow | 2010 | Russian Premier League | 24 | 0 | 2 | 0 | — | | — | | 26 | 0 |
| Dynamo Moscow | 2011–12 | Russian Premier League | 37 | 5 | 4 | 2 | — | | — | | 41 | 7 |
| Dynamo Moscow | 2012–13 | Russian Premier League | 22 | 10 | 1 | 0 | 3 (Note: Appearances in UEFA Europa League) | 3 | — | | 26 | 13 |
| Dynamo Moscow | 2013–14 | Russian Premier League | 22 | 10 | 1 | 0 | — | | — | | 23 | 10 |
| Dynamo Moscow | 2014–15 | Russian Premier League | 27 | 8 | 1 | 0 | 11 | 2 | — | | 39 | 10 |
| Dynamo Moscow | 2015–16 | Russian Premier League | 8 | 4 | 2 | 1 | — | | — | | 10 | 5 |
| Dynamo Moscow | Total | | 171 | 41 | 14 | 3 | 18 | 6 | — | | 203 | 50 |
| Zenit Saint Petersburg | 2015–16 | Russian Premier League | 10 | 2 | 2 | 1 | 2 (Note: Appearances in UEFA Champions League) | 0 | — | | 14 | 3 |
| Zenit Saint Petersburg | 2016–17 | Russian Premier League | 27 | 5 | 2 | 1 | 8 | 4 | 1 (Note: Appearance in Russian Super Cup) | 0 | 38 | 10 |
| Zenit Saint Petersburg | 2017–18 | Russian Premier League | 22 | 10 | 0 | 0 | 13 | 9 | — | | 35 | 19 |
| Zenit Saint Petersburg | 2018–19 | Russian Premier League | 3 | 0 | 1 | 1 | 1 | 1 | — | | 5 | 2 |
| Zenit Saint Petersburg | Total | | 62 | 17 | 5 | 3 | 24 | 14 | 1 | 0 | 92 | 34 |
| Sochi (loan) | 2019–20 | Russian Premier League | 10 | 7 | 0 | 0 | — | | — | | 10 | 7 |
| Spartak Moscow | 2020–21 | Russian Premier League | 8 | 2 | 2 | 0 | — | | — | | 10 | 2 |
| Fiorentina | 2020–21 | Serie A | 4 | 0 | 0 | 0 | — | | — | | 4 | 0 |
| Fiorentina | 2021–22 | Serie A | 6 | 0 | 1 | 0 | — | | — | | 7 | 0 |
| Fiorentina | 2023–24 | Serie A | 0 | 0 | 0 | 0 | 1 (Note: Appearance in UEFA Europa Conference League) | 0 | — | | 1 | 0 |
| Fiorentina | Total | | 10 | 0 | 1 | 0 | 1 | 0 | — | | 12 | 0 |
| Aris Limassol (loan) | 2022–23 | Cypriot First Division | 29 | 13 | 1 | 0 | 0 | 0 | — | | 30 | 13 |
| Aris Limassol (loan) | 2023–24 | Cypriot First Division | 24 | 7 | 3 | 0 | 5 | 2 | — | | 32 | 9 |
| Aris Limassol (loan) | Total | | 53 | 20 | 4 | 0 | 5 | 2 | — | | 62 | 22 |
| Aris Limassol | 2024–25 | Cypriot First Division | 28 | 10 | 2 | 1 | — | | — | | 30 | 11 |
| Aris Limassol | 2025–26 | Cypriot First Division | 18 | 1 | 1 | 0 | 4 (Note: Appearances in UEFA Conference League) | 0 | — | | 23 | 1 |
| Aris Limassol | Total | | 46 | 11 | 3 | 1 | 4 | 0 | — | | 53 | 12 |
| Career total | | | 360 | 98 | 29 | 7 | 52 | 22 | 1 | 0 | 442 | 127 |

=== International ===
Scores and results list Russia's goal tally first, score column indicates score after each Kokorin goal.

List of international goals scored by Aleksandr Kokorin
| No. | Date | Venue | Cap | Opponent | Score | Result | Competition |
|---|---|---|---|---|---|---|---|
| 1 | 11 September 2012 | Ramat Gan Stadium, Ramat Gan, Israel | 9 | Israel | 2–0 | 4–0 | 2014 FIFA World Cup qualification |
| 2 | 6 September 2013 | Kazan Arena, Kazan, Russia | 14 | Luxembourg | 1–0 | 4–1 | 2014 FIFA World Cup qualification |
| 3 | 6 September 2013 | Kazan Arena, Kazan, Russia | 14 | Luxembourg | 2–0 | 4–1 | 2014 FIFA World Cup qualification |
| 4 | 10 September 2013 | Petrovsky Stadium, Saint Petersburg, Russia | 15 | Israel | 2–0 | 3–1 | 2014 FIFA World Cup qualification |
| 5 | 5 March 2014 | Kuban Stadium, Krasnodar, Russia | 19 | Armenia | 1–0 | 2–0 | Friendly |
| 6 | 26 June 2014 | Arena da Baixada, Curitiba, Brazil | 25 | Algeria | 1–0 | 1–1 | 2014 FIFA World Cup |
| 7 | 9 October 2014 | Friends Arena, Solna, Sweden | 27 | Sweden | 1–0 | 1–1 | UEFA Euro 2016 qualifying |
| 8 | 7 June 2015 | Arena Khimki, Khimki, Russia | 31 | Belarus | 1–0 | 4–2 | Friendly |
| 9 | 8 September 2015 | Rheinpark Stadion, Vaduz, Liechtenstein | 34 | Liechtenstein | 2–0 | 7–0 | UEFA Euro 2016 qualifying |
| 10 | 12 October 2015 | Otkrytiye Arena, Moscow, Russia | 36 | Montenegro | 2–0 | 2–0 | UEFA Euro 2016 qualifying |
| 11 | 29 March 2016 | Stade de France, Saint-Denis, France | 37 | France | 1–2 | 2–4 | Friendly |
| 12 | 1 June 2016 | Tivoli-Neu, Innsbruck, Austria | 38 | Czech Republic | 1–0 | 1–2 | Friendly |

== Honours ==
Zenit Saint Petersburg

- Russian Premier League: 2018–19
- Russian Cup: 2015–16
- Russian Super Cup: 2016

Aris Limassol

- Cypriot First Division: 2022–23
