= Aleksandr Kalyashin =

Russian footballer

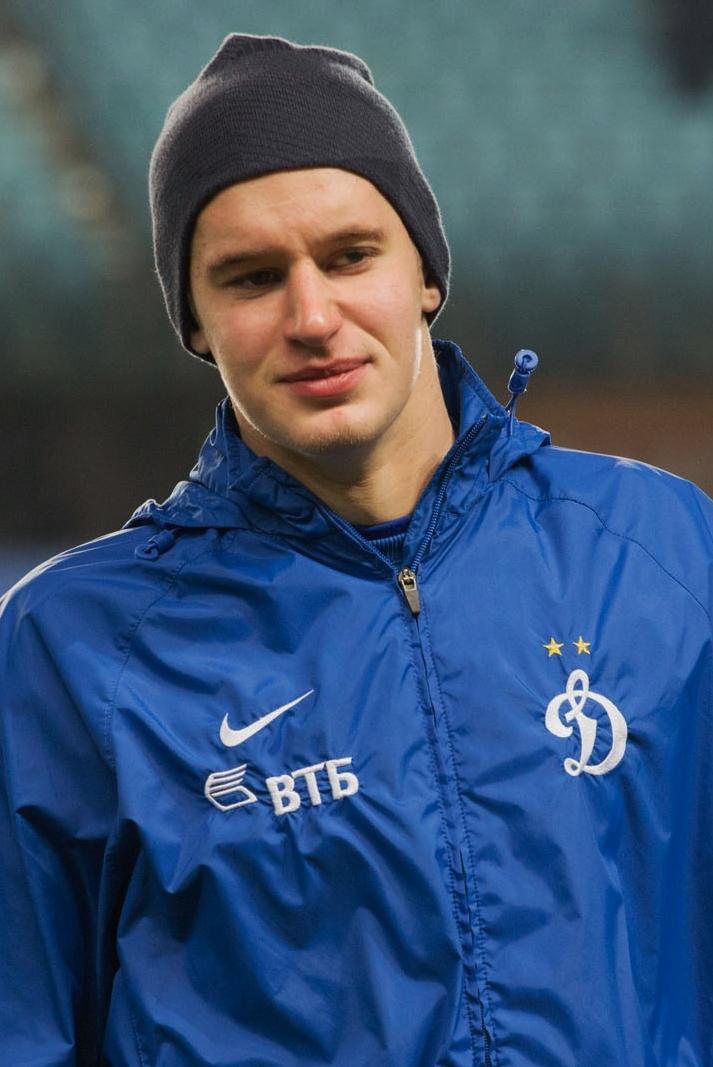
- Kalyashin with Dynamo Moscow in 2015

Personal information
- Full name: Aleksandr Andreyevich Kalyashin
- Date of birth: 24 January 1995 (age 31)
- Place of birth: Svobodny, Russia
- Height: 1.82 m (6 ft 0 in)
- Position: Centre back

Senior career*
Years	Team	Apps	(Gls)
2012	FC Akademiya Tolyatti	13	(0)
2013–2016	FC Dynamo Moscow	1	(0)
2016	→ FC Dynamo-2 Moscow	6	(0)
2017	FC Chayka Peschanokopskoye	11	(0)
2018–2019	Junior Sevan		
2019–2020	PFC Dynamo Stavropol	16	(1)
2020–2021	Sevan FC	19	(1)
2021–2023	FC Zenit Penza	41	(3)
2023	FC Znamya Truda Orekhovo-Zuyevo	0	(0)
2024	FC Kolomna	9	(0)

International career
2011	Russia U-16	3	(0)
2011–2012	Russia U-17	10	(0)
2013	Russia U-18	7	(0)
2013–2014	Russia U-19	10	(0)
2014–2016	Russia U-21	6	(0)
- * Club domestic league appearances and goals as of 3 November 2024

Aleksandr Andreyevich Kalyashin (Russian: Александр Андреевич Каляшин; born 24 January 1995) is a Russian football defender.

== Club career ==
He made his debut in the Russian Second Division for FC Akademiya Tolyatti on 30 April 2012 in a game against FC Zenit-Izhevsk Izhevsk.

He made his Russian Premier League debut for FC Dynamo Moscow on 17 October 2015 in a game against FC Amkar Perm.
