= Pavel Derevyagin =

Russian football player

Personal information
- Full name: Pavel Yevgenyevich Derevyagin
- Date of birth: 9 January 1996 (age 30)
- Place of birth: Livny, Russia
- Height: 1.86 m (6 ft 1 in)
- Position: Centre back

Youth career
- –2009: Olimpiyets Livny
- 2009–2012: FC Lokomotiv Moscow
- 2012–2013: PFC CSKA Moscow
- 2013: FC Dynamo Moscow

Senior career*
Years	Team	Apps	(Gls)
2013–2015	FC Dynamo Moscow	0	(0)
2015–2016	FC Dynamo Saint Petersburg	1	(0)
2016–2017	FC Sportakademklub Moscow		
2017–2019	FC Mordovia Saransk	33	(0)
2019–2020	FC Olimp Khimki	14	(0)
2020	FC Metallurg Vidnoye	11	(0)
- * Club domestic league appearances and goals

Pavel Yevgenyevich Derevyagin (Russian: Павел Евгеньевич Деревягин; born 9 January 1996) is a Russian former football player.

== Club career ==
He made his debut in the Russian Professional Football League for FC Dynamo Saint Petersburg on 5 October 2015 in a game against FC Volga Tver.

He made his Russian Football National League debut for FC Mordovia Saransk on 4 August 2018 in a game against FC SKA-Khabarovsk.
