= Kozel =

Kozel may refer to:

- Kozel (surname), Slavic surname
- Kozel Castle, a castle in the Czech Republic
- Kozel, a village and part of Kolonjë, Albania
- Velkopopovický Kozel, a Czech beer brewery
