= Rizvan Umarov =

Russian-Azerbaijani footballer (born 1993)

Personal information
- Full name: Rizvan Sarutdinoviç Umarov
- Date of birth: 5 April 1993 (age 33)
- Place of birth: Stavropol, Russia
- Height: 1.85 m (6 ft 1 in)
- Position: Centre forward

Team information
- Current team: Dynamo Saint Petersburg
- Number: 11

Senior career*
Years	Team	Apps	(Gls)
2010	SDYuSShOR Zenit St. Petersburg	16	(9)
2011–2012	Castellón	7	(0)
2012–2013	Elche Ilicitano	2	(0)
2013–2014	Anzhi Makhachkala	0	(0)
2014–2015	Dynamo Saint Petersburg	25	(1)
2015	SKA-Energiya Khabarovsk	9	(0)
2016	Narva Trans	30	(11)
2017–2019	Neftekhimik Nizhnekamsk	34	(19)
2019–2022	Leningradets Leningrad Oblast	65	(31)
2022–2023	Rotor Volgograd	33	(7)
2023–	Dynamo Saint Petersburg	85	(15)

International career^{‡}
2012–	Azerbaijan	3	(0)
- * Club domestic league appearances and goals as of 1 November 2026 ‡ National team caps and goals as of 18:42, 7 January 2015 (UTC)

Rizvan Sarutdinoviç Umarov (born 5 April 1993) is a professional footballer who plays as a centre forward for Dynamo Saint Petersburg.

Born in Russia, he represented Azerbaijan at international level.

== Club career ==
Born in Stavropol, Russia, Umarov has played club football in Russia and Spain for SDYuSShOR Zenit, Castellón, Elche Ilicitano, Anzhi and Dynamo Saint Petersburg.

On 30 June 2014, Umarov signed with Russian Football National League club Dynamo Saint Petersburg.

On 18 February 2016, Umarov signed with Meistriliiga club JK Narva Trans.

== International career ==
He made his international debut for Azerbaijan in 2012.

== Personal life ==
He also holds Russian citizenship.
