= Makhach Gadzhiyev =

Russian footballer (born 1987)

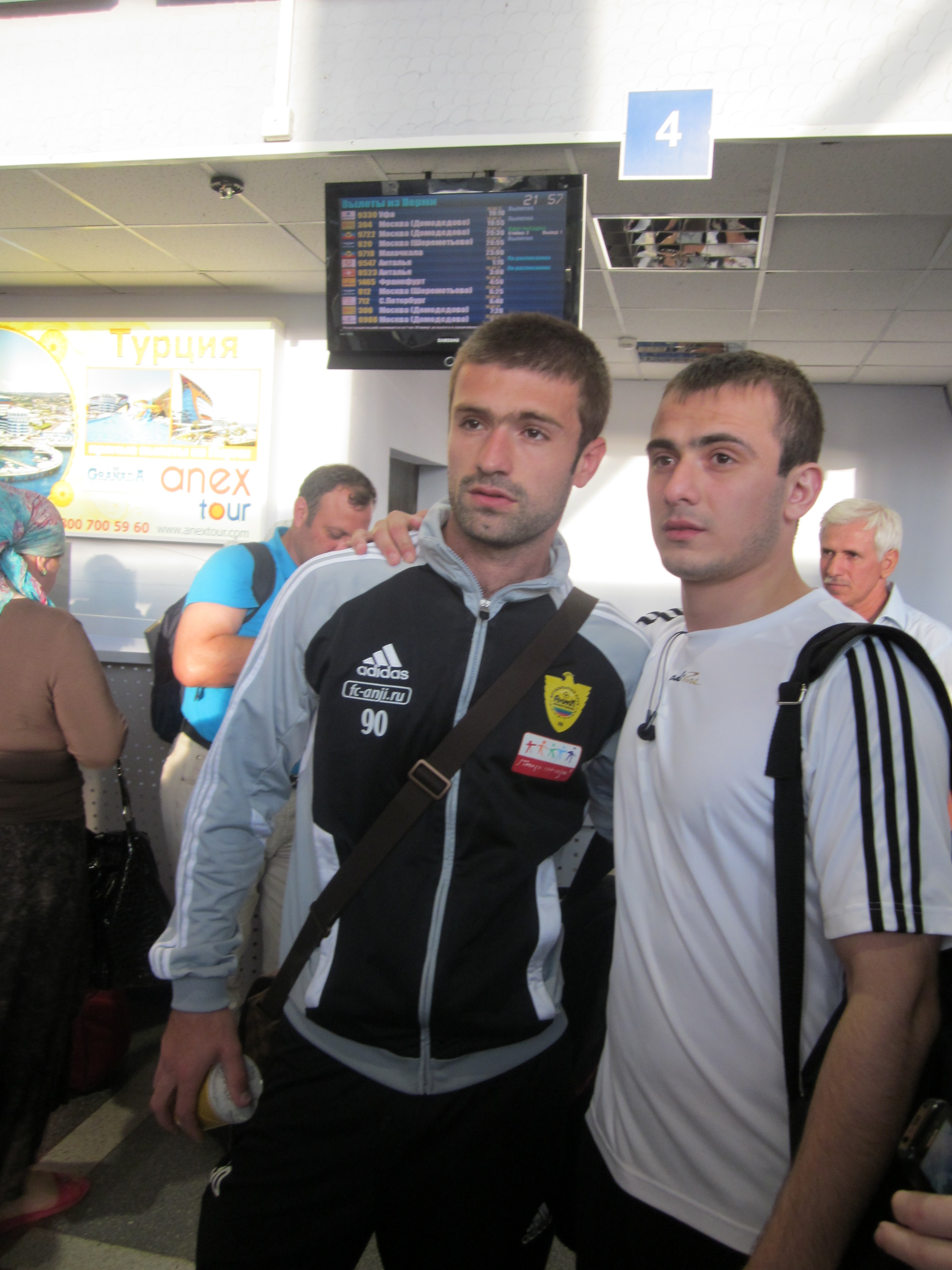

Personal information
- Full name: Makhach Gadzhiyevich Gadzhiyev
- Date of birth: 18 October 1987 (age 39)
- Place of birth: Kizilyurt, Russian SFSR
- Height: 1.82 m (5 ft 11 1/2 in)
- Position: Midfielder

Youth career
- Spartak Moscow

Senior career*
Years	Team	Apps	(Gls)
2003–2004	Spartak Moscow	0	(0)
2005–2007	Krylia Sovetov Samara	25	(2)
2007–2010	Saturn Ramenskoye	2	(0)
2009	→ Rubin Kazan (loan)	1	(0)
2011–2012	Anzhi Makhachkala	23	(3)
2012–2013	Tavriya Simferopol	16	(3)
2013	Amkar Perm	10	(0)
2014	Anzhi Makhachkala	5	(1)
- * Club domestic league appearances and goals

Makhach Gadzhiyevich Gadzhiyev (Russian: Махач Гаджиевич Гаджиев; born 18 October 1987) is a former Russian professional footballer.

== Career ==
He made his professional debut in RFPL in 2005 for FC Krylia Sovetov Samara.

On 14 September 2012 he signed a one-year contract, with the option of another two-years, with Ukrainian football club Tavriya. After one year, though, he returned to Russian championship after signing for FC Amkar Perm. After six months Gadzhiyev left Amkar Perm, and moved on a free transfer back to Anzhi Makhachkala, on a contract till the end of the season.

== Legal issues ==
On 17 November 2017, Gadzhiyev was convicted of fraud by the Kizilyurt court. At the same time that he joined Anzhi in 2010 he also was serving in a local police department (on paper), even though he was not in reality performing any police work, but just collecting a paycheck. He was given a 2-year conditional sentence with a 1-year probation.
