= Alan Gatagov =

Russian footballer

Alan Gatagov Алан Гатагов
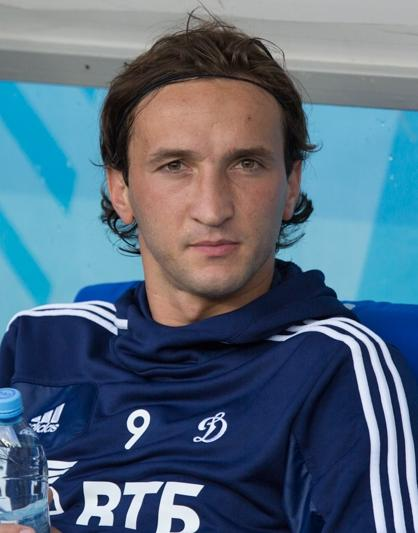
- Gatagov with Dynamo Moscow in 2013

Personal information
- Full name: Alan Maratovich Gatagov
- Date of birth: 23 January 1991 (age 35)
- Place of birth: Vladikavkaz, Soviet Union
- Height: 1.84 m (6 ft 1/2 in)
- Position: Midfielder

Youth career
- Lokomotiv Moscow

Senior career*
Years	Team	Apps	(Gls)
2009–2011	Lokomotiv Moscow	48	(4)
2011–2014	Dynamo Moscow	4	(1)
2012	→ Tom Tomsk (loan)	5	(1)
2013	→ Anzhi Makhachkala (loan)	7	(1)
2014–2015	Maccabi Petah Tikva F.C.	0	(0)
2015	Irtysh Pavlodar	17	(1)
2015–2016	Taraz	6	(0)
2016	Levadia Tallinn	21	(2)

International career
2008–2010	Russia U-19	11	(2)
2009–2011	Russia U-21	14	(7)
- * Club domestic league appearances and goals

Alan Maratovich Gatagov (Russian: Алан Маратович Гатагов, Iron Ossetic: Гæтæгты Мараты фырт Алан, romanized: Gætæhty Maraty fyrt Alan; born 23 January 1991) is a Russian former professional footballer.

== Career ==
=== Club ===
Gatagov made his debut in the Russian Premier League on 16 May 2009 for Lokomotiv Moscow in a game against Terek Grozny.

Gatagov's first game for Dynamo Moscow in the 2012–13 Russian Cup game against FC Torpedo Moscow on 26 September 2012.

In December 2014, Gatagov went on trial with Kazakhstan Premier League side FC Irtysh Pavlodar, signing a contract with them in January 2015. Gatagov moved to fellow Kazakhstan Premier League side FC Taraz in July 2015.

On 1 April 2016, Gatagov signed a two-year contract with Levadia Tallinn.

=== International career ===
Gatagov was a part of the Russia U-21 side that was competing in the 2011 European Under-21 Championship qualification. On 16 November 2010, Alan Gatagov scored a goal from a long distance against U-21 France national team and this goal gave his team victory by score 1-0.

== Career statistics ==
=== Club ===
As of match played 8 November 2015

Club	Season	League		Cup		Europe		Total	
Club	Season	Apps	Goals	Apps	Goals	Apps	Goals	Apps	Goals
Lokomotiv Moscow	2009	21	1	1	0	-	-	22	1
Lokomotiv Moscow	2010	18	1	1	0	2	0	21	1
Lokomotiv Moscow	2011–12	9	2	0	0	0	0	9	2
Lokomotiv Moscow	Total	48	4	2	0	2	0	52	4
Dynamo Moscow	2011–12	0	0	0	0	0	0	0	0
Dynamo Moscow	2012–13	3	1	0	0	0	0	3	1
Dynamo Moscow	2013–14	1	0	0	0	0	0	1	0
Dynamo Moscow	Total	4	1	0	0	0	0	4	1
Tom Tomsk (loan)	2011–12	5	1	0	0	0	0	5	1
Tom Tomsk (loan)	Total	5	1	0	0	0	0	5	1
Anzhi Makhachkala (loan)	2013–14	7	1	1	0	4	0	7	1
Anzhi Makhachkala (loan)	Total	7	1	1	0	4	0	12	1
Maccabi Petah Tikva	2014–15	0	0	1	0	0	0	1	0
Maccabi Petah Tikva	Total	0	0	1	0	0	0	1	0
Irtysh Pavlodar	2015	17	1	0	0	0	0	17	1
Irtysh Pavlodar	Total	17	1	1	0	0	0	18	1
Taraz	2015	6	0	0	0	0	0	6	0
Taraz	Total	6	0	0	0	0	0	6	0
Career Totals		87	8	5	0	6	0	98	8

== Personal life ==
His younger brother Soslan Gatagov is also a professional footballer.
