= Vladimir Sobolev (footballer) =

Russian footballer

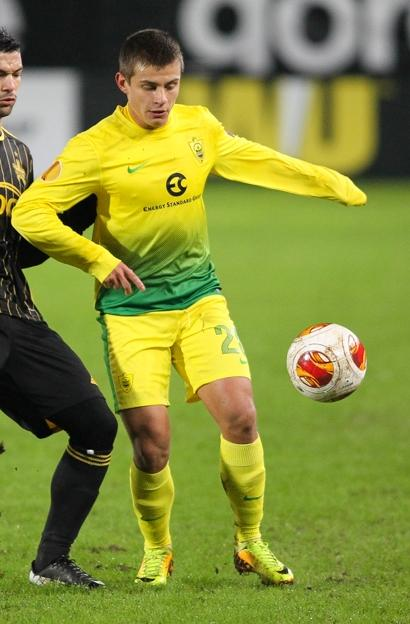
- Sobolev with Anzhi Makhachkala in 2013

Personal information
- Full name: Vladimir Yuryevich Sobolev
- Date of birth: 30 July 1991 (age 35)
- Place of birth: Gukovo, Russian SFSR
- Height: 1.67 m (5 ft 5 1/2 in)
- Position: Midfielder

Youth career
- Saturn Ramenskoye

Senior career*
Years	Team	Apps	(Gls)
2010	Saturn Ramenskoye	2	(0)
2011–2014	Dynamo Moscow	3	(0)
2012–2013	→ Khimki (loan)	30	(2)
2013–2014	→ Anzhi Makhachkala (loan)	9	(0)
2014–2017	Rubin Kazan	0	(0)
2016	→ Neftekhimik Nizhnekamsk (loan)	10	(0)

International career
2010–2011	Russia U-19	8	(2)
2011	Russia U-21	1	(0)
- * Club domestic league appearances and goals

Vladimir Yuryevich Sobolev (Russian: Владимир Юрьевич Соболев; born 30 July 1991) is a Russian former footballer who played as a midfielder.

== Club career ==
He made his Russian Premier League debut on 10 July 2010 for Saturn Ramenskoye in a game against CSKA Moscow.

== Career statistics ==
Club	Season	League			Cup		Continental		Total	
Club	Season	Division	Apps	Goals	Apps	Goals	Apps	Goals	Apps	Goals
Saturn Ramenskoye	2010	Russian Premier League	2	0	1	0	–		3	0
Dynamo Moscow	2011–12	Russian Premier League	0	0	0	0	–		0	0
Dynamo Moscow	2013–14	Russian Premier League	3	0	–		–		3	0
Dynamo Moscow	Total		3	0	0	0	0	0	3	0
Khimki (loan)	2012–13	Russian First League	30	2	3	2	–		33	4
Anzhi Makhachkala	2013–14	Russian Premier League	9	0	1	0	4 (Note: Appearances in the UEFA Europa League)	0	14	0
Rubin Kazan	2014–15	Russian Premier League	0	0	0	0	–		0	0
Rubin Kazan	2015–16	Russian Premier League	0	0	0	0	0	0	0	0
Rubin Kazan	2016–17	Russian Premier League	0	0	0	0	–		0	0
Rubin Kazan	Total		0	0	0	0	0	0	0	0
Neftekhimik Nizhnekamsk (loan)	2016–17	Russian First League	10	0	–		–		10	0
Career total			54	2	5	2	4	0	63	4
