= Pavel Solomatin =

Russian footballer

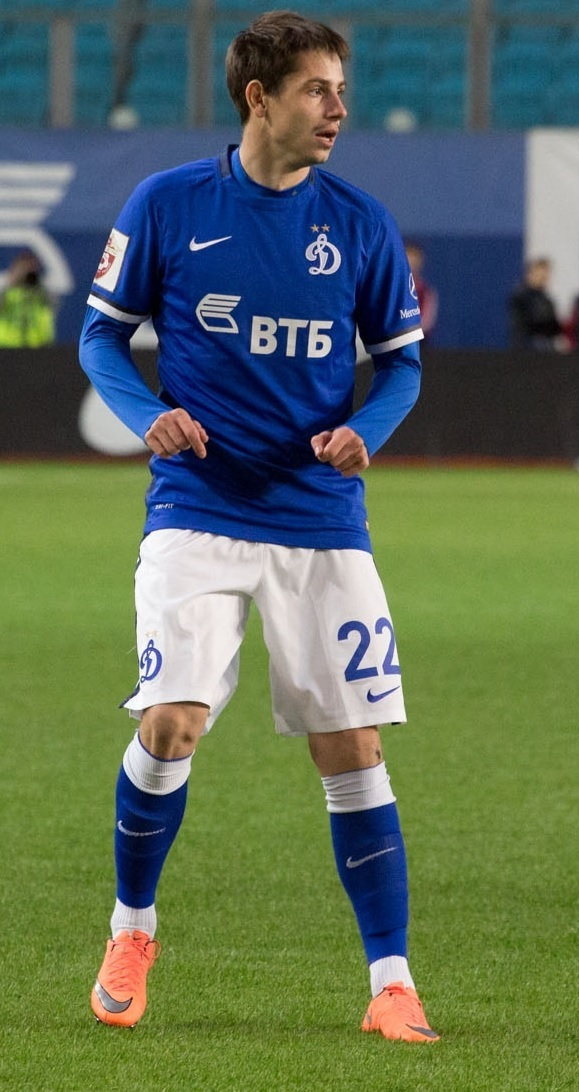
- Solomatin with Dynamo Moscow in 2016

Personal information
- Full name: Pavel Olegovich Solomatin
- Date of birth: 4 April 1993 (age 33)
- Place of birth: Tolyatti, Russia
- Height: 1.76 m (5 ft 9 in)
- Positions: Forward; midfielder

Team information
- Current team: Astrakhan
- Number: 10

Youth career
- 1999–2007: Lada-Tolyatti
- 2007–2010: Spartak Moscow

Senior career*
Years	Team	Apps	(Gls)
2011–2012	Karelia Petrozavodsk	36	(8)
2012–2016	Dynamo Moscow	20	(2)
2013	→ Anzhi Makhachkala (loan)	11	(2)
2014–2015	→ Amkar Perm (loan)	7	(0)
2016–2017	Baltika Kaliningrad	17	(1)
2017–2018	Volgar Astrakhan	9	(0)
2018–2019	Torpedo Moscow	20	(3)
2019	Akron Tolyatti	7	(1)
2020–2021	Yessentuki	30	(13)
2021	Amkar Perm	19	(2)
2022	Tuapse	12	(4)
2022–2023	Astrakhan (amateur)		
2023	SKA Rostov-on-Don	19	(8)
2024	Sokol Kazan	13	(9)
2024	Astrakhan	17	(5)
2025	Lit Energy Moscow (amateur)		
2025	SKA Rostov-on-Don (amateur)		
2026–	Astrakhan	11	(0)

International career
2008–2009	Russia U-16	4	(0)
2009	Russia U-17	6	(1)
2013	Russia U-21	2	(0)
- * Club domestic league appearances and goals as of 31 October 2026

Pavel Olegovich Solomatin (Russian: Павел Олегович Соломатин; born 4 April 1993) is a Russian professional football player who plays for Astrakhan.

== Club career ==
He made his debut in the Russian Second Division for Karelia Petrozavodsk on 18 April 2011 in a game against Petrotrest St. Petersburg.

He played his first match in Russian Premier League for Dynamo Moscow on 16 March 2013 as a substitute in away game against Kuban Krasnodar (1–1).

== Career statistics ==
As of 15 June 2024

Club	Season	League			Cup		Continental		Total	
Club	Season	Division	Apps	Goals	Apps	Goals	Apps	Goals	Apps	Goals
Karelia Petrozavodsk	2011–12	Russian Second League	36	8	0	0	–		36	8
Dynamo Moscow	2012–13	Russian Premier League	9	1	0	0	–		9	1
Dynamo Moscow	2013–14	Russian Premier League	9	1	–		–		9	1
Dynamo Moscow	2015–16	Russian Premier League	2	0	0	0	–		2	0
Dynamo Moscow	2016–17	Russian First League	0	0	–		–		0	0
Dynamo Moscow	Total		20	2	0	0	0	0	20	2
Anzhi Makhachkala (loan)	2013–14	Russian Premier League	11	2	1	0	5 (Note: Appearances in the UEFA Europa League)	0	17	2
Amkar Perm (loan)	2014–15	Russian Premier League	7	0	1	0	–		8	0
Baltika Kaliningrad	2016–17	Russian First League	17	1	1	0	–		18	1
Baltika Kaliningrad	2017–18	Russian First League	0	0	0	0	–		0	0
Baltika Kaliningrad	Total		17	1	1	0	0	0	18	1
Volgar Astrakhan	2017–18	Russian First League	9	0	1	0	–		10	0
Torpedo Moscow	2018–19	Russian Second League	20	3	4	0	–		24	3
Torpedo Moscow	2019–20	Russian First League	0	0	–		–		0	0
Torpedo Moscow	Total		20	3	4	0	0	0	24	3
Akron Tolyatti	2019–20	Russian Second League	7	1	0	0	–		7	1
Yessentuki	2020–21	Russian Second League	30	13	1	0	–		31	13
Amkar Perm	2021–22	Russian Second League	19	2	0	0	–		19	2
Tuapse	2021–22	Russian Second League	12	4	–		–		12	4
SKA Rostov-on-Don	2023	Russian Second League B	19	8	3	1	–		22	9
Sokol Kazan	2024	Russian Second League B	10	8	0	0	–		10	8
Career total			217	52	12	1	5	0	234	53
