= Serder Serderov =

Russian footballer (born 1994)

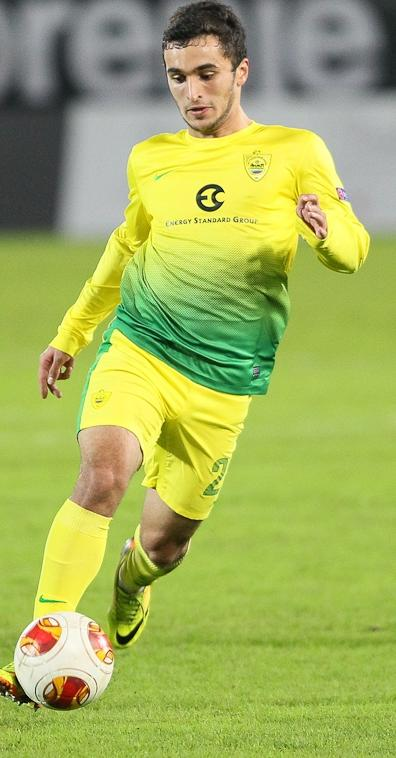
- Serderov with Anzhi Makhachkala in 2013

Personal information
- Full name: Serder Mukailovich Serderov
- Date of birth: 10 March 1994 (age 32)
- Place of birth: Makhachkala, Russia
- Height: 1.76 m (5 ft 9 in)
- Positions: Striker; winger

Team information
- Current team: Dynamo Makhachkala
- Number: 28

Youth career
- 2001–: RSDYuShOR-2 Makhachkala
- –2008: Anzhi Makhachkala
- 2008–2012: CSKA Moscow

Senior career*
Years	Team	Apps	(Gls)
2010–2012	CSKA Moscow	0	(0)
2012–2015	Anzhi Makhachkala	37	(3)
2013	→ Ural Yekaterinburg (loan)	4	(0)
2015	→ Krylia Sovetov (loan)	2	(0)
2016–2017	Slavia Sofia	38	(10)
2017–2018	Yenisey Krasnoyarsk	30	(1)
2018	Cracovia	6	(0)
2019–2020	Inter Zaprešić	40	(16)
2020–2021	Mezőkövesd	13	(2)
2021–2023	Istra 1961	21	(0)
2022	→ Aktobe (loan)	18	(4)
2023	Sogdiana Jizzakh	11	(1)
2023–	Dynamo Makhachkala	64	(10)

International career
2010–2011	Russia U17	6	(7)
2014	Russia U21	3	(1)
- * Club domestic league appearances and goals as of 19 April 2026

Serder Mukailovich Serderov (Russian: Сердер Мукаилович Сердеров, Lezgian: Сердер Мукаилан хва Сердеров; born 10 March 1994) is a Russian professional footballer who plays as a striker or winger for Dynamo Makhachkala.

== Career ==
=== CSKA Moscow ===
Serderov was a youth player of the local academy RSDYuShOR-2 Makhachkala, playing for Anzhi Makhachkala youth teams, before moving to CSKA Moscow at the age of 14. In the summer of 2010 Italian champion Juventus wanted to sign the 17-year-old Serderov, but CSKA declined the offer.

On 22 November 2011 he made his professional debut for the team in a match against OSC Lille in the Champions League, coming on as a substitute in the 87th minute of the game.

=== Anzhi ===
In the summer of 2012 he moved to Anzhi Makhachkala. He made his debut in the Russian Premier League on 18 November 2012 for Anzhi Makhachkala in a game against Rostov.

==== Ural loan ====
In the June 2013 Serderov joined newly promoted Ural Yekaterinburg on a season-long loan. The loan was ended on 16 August 2013.

==== Loan return ====
He returned in Anzhi after only 4 games with the team, but became a key player for the 2013–14 season after Anzhi budget cuts with a total of 29 matches this season. He made his second debut in the Russian Premier League for Anzhi on 17 August 2013 in a 3:0 loss to Zenit Saint Petersburg. On 17 March 2014 he scored his debut goal in the league for Anzhi in a match against Spartak Moscow where he scored in the 95th minute for the ending 2:2 result.

==== Krylia Sovetov loan ====
In February 2015 Serderov moved on loan again, this time to Krylia Sovetov Samara until the end of the season. He played in only 2 matches.

His Anzhi contract was dissolved by mutual consent on 28 January 2016.

=== Slavia Sofia ===
Serderov joined Bulgarian club Slavia Sofia on 1 February 2016, eventually debuting unofficially for the team in a friendly match against Slovak champions Trenčín during their winter training camp. He made his official debut in the first A Group match after the winter break against Cherno More Varna. He scored his first goal in a 1–0 away win over Botev Plovdiv on 3 March 2016. On 24 April 2016 he received an injury which eventually led him to miss out the rest of the season.

In June 2017, Serderov's contract was terminated by mutual consent.

=== Yenisey Krasnoyarsk ===
On 19 July 2017, Serderov signed a two-year contract with Yenisey Krasnoyarsk.

=== Cracovia ===
On 16 August 2018, Serderov signed a contract with Polish club Cracovia. He left Cracovia by mutual consent on 2 January 2019.

=== Inter Zaprešić ===
On 14 January 2019, he joined Croatian club Inter Zaprešić.

=== Mezőkövesd ===
On 4 August 2020, he signed a three-year contract with Hungarian club Mezőkövesd.

== Career statistics ==
As of match played 29 October 2026

Appearances and goals by club, season and competition
Club	Season	League			Cup		Continental		Other		Total	
Club	Season	Division	Apps	Goals	Apps	Goals	Apps	Goals	Apps	Goals	Apps	Goals
CSKA Moscow	2010	Russian Premier League	0	0	0	0	0	0	0	0	0	0
CSKA Moscow	2011–12	Russian Premier League	0	0	0	0	1 (Note: Appearance in the UEFA Champions League)	0	0	0	1	0
CSKA Moscow	Total		0	0	0	0	1	0	0	0	1	0
Anzhi Makhachkala	2012–13	Russian Premier League	4	0	2	1	0	0	—		6	1
Anzhi Makhachkala	2013–14	Russian Premier League	21	2	1	0	7 (Note: Appearances in the UEFA Europa League)	0	—		29	2
Anzhi Makhachkala	2014–15	Russian First League	11	1	2	0	—		—		13	1
Anzhi Makhachkala	2015–16	Russian Premier League	1	0	1	0	—		—		2	0
Anzhi Makhachkala	Total		37	3	6	1	7	0	0	0	50	4
Ural Yekaterinburg (loan)	2013–14	Russian Premier League	4	0	—		—		—		4	0
Krylia Sovetov (loan)	2014–15	Russian First League	2	0	0	0	—		4 (Note: Appearances in the FNL Cup)	1	6	1
Slavia Sofia	2015–16	Bulgarian First League	11	2	—		—		—		11	2
Slavia Sofia	2016–17	Bulgarian First League	27	8	1	0	2	1	4 (Note: Appearances in the relegation play-offs)	2	34	11
Slavia Sofia	Total		38	10	1	0	2	1	4	2	45	13
Yenisey Krasnoyarsk	2017–18	Russian First League	30	1	3	0	—		2 (Note: Appearances in the promotion play-offs)	1	35	2
Cracovia	2018–19	Ekstraklasa	6	0	2	0	—		—		8	0
Inter Zaprešić	2018–19	Croatian Football League	18	7	1	0	—		—		19	7
Inter Zaprešić	2019–20	Croatian Football League	22	9	2	0	—		—		24	9
Inter Zaprešić	Total		40	16	3	0	0	0	0	0	43	16
Mezőkövesd	2020–21	NB I	13	2	1	0	—		—		14	2
Mezőkövesd	2021–22	NB I	0	0	—		—		—		0	0
Mezőkövesd	Total		13	2	1	0	0	0	0	0	14	2
Istra 1961	2021–22	Croatian Football League	21	0	3	1	—		—		24	1
Istra 1961	2022–23	Croatian Football League	0	0	—		—		—		0	0
Istra 1961	Total		21	0	3	1	0	0	0	0	24	1
Aktobe (loan)	2022	Kazakhstan Premier League	18	4	4	0	—		—		22	4
Sogdiana Jizzakh	2023	Uzbekistan Super League	11	1	2	1	—		—		13	2
Dynamo Makhachkala	2023–24	Russian First League	30	9	0	0	—		—		30	9
Dynamo Makhachkala	2024–25	Russian Premier League	21	1	5	1	—		—		26	2
Dynamo Makhachkala	2025–26	Russian Premier League	13	0	4	0	—		—		17	0
Dynamo Makhachkala	2026–27	Russian Premier League	0	0	4	0	—		—		4	0
Dynamo Makhachkala	Total		64	10	13	1	—		—		77	11
Career total			285	47	38	4	10	1	10	4	343	56
