= 2011–12 FC Dynamo Moscow season =

Dynamo Moscow
2011–12 season
- Manager: Sergei Silkin (from April 2011)
- Stadium: Arena Khimki, Khimki, Russia (capacity 18,636)
- Premier League: 4th
- 2010–11 Russian Cup: Quarter-final vs Rostov
- 2011–12 Russian Cup: Final vs Rubin
- Top goalscorer: Kevin Kurányi (13)
- Highest home attendance: 18,636 vs Spartak; League, 6 November 2011
- Lowest home attendance: 5,200 vs Rostov; Cup, 20 April 2011
- Average home league attendance: 9,975

The 2011–12 Dynamo Moscow season was the 89th season in club history. During this long season (transitional from 'spring-autumn' formula to 'autumn-spring'), club participated in three competitions – the Russian Premier League, the 2010–11 Russian Cup and the 2011–12 Russian Cup.

== Review and events ==
During season, two managers worked with first team:
Miodrag Božović worked with team during pre-season and first few matches but was dismissed after Cup exit in home match vs Rostov;
Sergei Silkin who worked earlier with the youth team was appointed as the first team manager after Božović was fired in the end of April 2011 before Matchday 6.

Igor Semshov started season as a captain of Dynamo Moscow. Andriy Voronin was appointed club captain after arrival of Sergei Silkin as a manager. When Voronin was not in starting XI, captain's functions were delegated to Kevin Kurányi or Igor Semshov.

== Matches and results ==
=== Legend ===
Win Draw Loss

=== Russian Premier League ===
==== Results by matchday ====
Round	1	2	3	4	5	6	7	8	9	10	11	12	13	14	15	16	17	18	19	20	21	22	23	24	25	26	27	28	29	30	31	32	33	34	35	36	37	38	39	40	41	42	43	44
Ground	A	H	A	H	A	H	A	H	A	H	A	H	A	H	A	H	A	H	A	H	A	H	A	H	A	H	A	H	A	H	H	A	H	A	H	H	A	H	A	H	A	A	H	A
Result	L	W	L	W	D	D	W	D	D	W	W	D	L	W	W	W	W	W	L	W	L	W	W	W	L	W	D	L	W	D	W	L	L	D	L	L	W	D	W	W	L	D	D	D
Position	10	6	13	5	9	9	6	7	8	6	3	5	7	5	5	3	3	3	3	3	3	3	3	2	3	3	3	4	3	3	3	3	3	3	4	5	4	4	3	2	2	3	4	4

Source: Matches
A = Away; H = Home; W = Win; D = Draw; L = Loss

==== Matches and tables ====
===== First stage =====
12 March 2011 1	Lokomotiv Moscow	3–2	Dynamo	Moscow
15:30 MSK (UTC+4)	Ďurica 4'; Burlak 47'; Torbinski 61'	[ Summary]	Samedov 90'; Kurányi 90+1'	Stadium: Lokomotiv Stadium; Attendance: 14,863; Referee: Maksim Layushkin

19 March 2011 2	Dynamo	3–1	Rostov	Moscow
16:15 MSK (UTC+4)	Fernández 50'; Misimović 75' (pen.); Voronin 90'	[ Summary]	Khagush 86'	Stadium: Arena Khimki; Attendance: 6,841; Referee: Vyacheslav Popov

2 April 2011 3	Volga Nizhny Novgorod	3–0	Dynamo	Nizhny Novgorod
16:15 MSK (UTC+4)	Pleșan 63'; Khojava 65'; Ahmetović 75'	[ Summary]		Stadium: Lokomotiv Stadium (Nizhny Novgorod); Attendance: 17,500; Referee: Aleksandr Egorov

9 April 2011 4	Dynamo	1–0	Kuban Krasnodar	Moscow
18:30 MSK (UTC+4)	Semshov 83'	[ Summary]		Stadium: Arena Khimki; Attendance: 5,512; Referee: Sergey Karasev

16 April 2011 5	Terek Grozny	0–0	Dynamo	Grozny, Chechnya
18:30 MSK (UTC+4)		[ Summary]		Stadium: Sultan Bilimkhanov Stadium; Attendance: 9,200; Referee: Vyacheslav Popov

25 April 2011 6	Dynamo	2–2	Anzhi Makhachkala	Moscow
19:30 MSK (UTC+4)	Semshov (yellow card) 30' (yellow-red card) 57'; Kokorin 63'; Misimović 88' (pen.)	[ Summary]	Roberto Carlos 58' (pen.); Angbwa 72'	Stadium: Arena Khimki; Attendance: 12,375; Referee: Igor Egorov

2 May 2011 7	Spartak Nalchik	2–3	Dynamo	Nalchik, Kabardino-Balkaria
16:00 MSK (UTC+4)	Milić 82'; Berkhamov 87'	[ Summary]	Sapeta 8'; Smolov 54'; Samedov 67'	Stadium: Spartak Stadium (Nalchik); Attendance: 3,500; Referee: Vladimir Pettay

8 May 2011 8	Dynamo	2–2	CSKA	Moscow
14:00 MSK (UTC+4)	Voronin 45'; Lomić 90+1'	[ Summary]	Ignashevich 5'; Doumbia 81'	Stadium: Arena Khimki; Attendance: 14,764; Referee: Aleksei Nikolaev

15 May 2011 9	Amkar Perm	0–0	Dynamo	Perm, Perm Krai
13:30 MSK (UTC+4)		[ Summary]		Stadium: Zvezda Stadium; Attendance: 9,500; Referee: Vitali Meshkov

21 May 2011 10	Dynamo	1–0	Krylia Sovetov Samara	Moscow
16:15 MSK (UTC+4)	Voronin 48'	[ Summary]		Stadium: Arena Khimki; Attendance: 6,809; Referee: Mikhail Vilkov

29 May 2011 11	Krasnodar	0–1	Dynamo	Krasnodar, Krasnodar Krai
20:30 MSK (UTC+4)		[Summary]	Smolov 81'	Stadium: Kuban Stadium; Attendance: 9,000; Referee: Vladislav Bezborodov

10 June 2011 12	Dynamo	1–1	Zenit Saint Petersburg	Moscow
20:00 MSK (UTC+4)	Samedov 90+5'	[ Summary]	Lazović 82'; Fayzulin (yellow card) 73' (yellow-red card) 90+2'	Stadium: Arena Khimki; Attendance: 13,734; Referee: Igor Egorov

14 June 2011 13	Rubin Kazan	3–0	Dynamo	Kazan, Tatarstan
21:00 MSK (UTC+4)	Bocchetti 42'; César Navas 75'; Natcho 90+1' (pen.)	[ Summary]		Stadium: Central Stadium; Attendance: 17,120; Referee: Vladimir Pettay

18 June 2011 14	Dynamo	3–0	Tom Tomsk	Moscow
16:30 MSK (UTC+4)	Samedov 27'; Kurányi 38'; Kokorin 44'	[ Summary]		Stadium: Arena Khimki; Attendance: 6,484; Referee: Vladimir Kazmenko

22 June 2011 15	Spartak Moscow	0–2	Dynamo	Moscow
18:45 MSK (UTC+4)		[ Summary]	Semshov 34'; Voronin 65'	Stadium: Luzhniki Stadium; Attendance: 20,752; Referee: Sergei Karasev

26 June 2011 16	Dynamo	4–1	Lokomotiv Moscow	Moscow
21:00 MSK (UTC+4)	Kurányi 10', 25'; Kokorin (yellow card) 19' (yellow-red card) 26'; Semshov 37'; Voronin 79'	[ Summary]	Ďurica (yellow card) 58' (yellow-red card) 64'; Loskov 67'	Stadium: Arena Khimki; Attendance: 11,995; Referee: Almir Kayumov

24 July 2011 17	Rostov	0–2	Dynamo	Rostov, Rostov Oblast
20:00 MSK (UTC+4)	Kalachev (yellow card) 31' (yellow-red card) 88'	[ Summary]	Semshov 12', 76'	Stadium: Olimp - 2 Attendance: 8,000; Referee: Vladislav Bezborodov

31 July 2011 18	Dynamo	2–0	Volga Nizhny Novgorod	Moscow
18:45 MSK (UTC+4)	Semshov 59'; Samedov 90'	[ Summary]	Grigalava (yellow card) 28' (yellow-red card) 29'	Stadium: Arena Khimki; Attendance: 14,935; Referee: Stanislav Sukhina

6 August 2011 19	Kuban Krasnodar	3–1	Dynamo	Krasnodar, Krasnodar Krai
21:00 MSK (UTC+4)	Davydov 45', 64'; Komkov 72'	[ Summary]	Kurányi 59'	Stadium: Kuban Stadium; Attendance: 18,220; Referee: Igor Egorov

13 August 2011 20	Dynamo	6–2	Terek Grozny	Moscow
16:15 MSK (UTC+4)	Voronin 29'; Kurányi 35'; Semshov 45', 85'; Yusupov 49'; Sapeta 90'	[ Summary]	Ewerthon 6'; Georgiev 87'	Stadium: Arena Khimki; Attendance: 6,441; Referee: Aleksandr Egorov

21 August 2011 21	Anzhi Makhachkala	2–1	Dynamo	Makhachkala, Dagestan
21:00 MSK (UTC+4)	Boussoufa 22'; Prudnikov 67'	[ Summary]	Voronin 44'	Stadium: Dynamo Stadium; Attendance: 15,200; Referee: Vladislav Bezborodov

28 August 2011 22	Dynamo	2–0	Spartak Nalchik	Moscow
16:30 MSK (UTC+4)	Kurányi 17'; Semshov 36'	[ Summary]		Stadium: Arena Khimki; Attendance: 8,168; Referee: Vitali Meshkov

10 September 2011 23	CSKA	0–4	Dynamo	Moscow
14:00 MSK (UTC+4)		[ Summary]	Voronin 36'; Kurányi 39'; Fernández 69'; Kokorin 90'	Stadium: Arena Khimki; Attendance: 15,000; Referee: Maksim Layushkin

18 September 2011 24	Dynamo	3–0	Amkar Perm	Moscow
16:15 MSK (UTC+4)	Voronin 10'; Semshov 60'; Nyakhaychyk 86'	[ Summary]		Stadium: Arena Khimki; Attendance: 7,796; Referee: Vladimir Kazmenko

25 September 2011 25	Krylia Sovetov Samara	1–0	Dynamo	Samara, Samara Oblast
18:30 MSK (UTC+4)	Kornilenko 11'	[ Summary]	Granat (red card) 36'	Stadium: Metallurg Stadium; Attendance: 8,700; Referee: Igor Egorov

1 October 2011 26	Dynamo	2–1	Krasnodar	Moscow
18:30 MSK (UTC+4)	Voronin 32', 75'	[ Summary]	Shipitsin 29'	Stadium: Arena Khimki; Attendance: 6,785; Referee: Vitali Meshkov

15 October 2011 27	Zenit Saint Petersburg	0–0	Dynamo	Saint Petersburg
18:30 MSK (UTC+4)		[ Summary]		Stadium: Petrovsky Stadium; Attendance: 21,000; Referee: Mikhail Vilkov

24 October 2011 28	Dynamo	0–2	Rubin Kazan	Moscow
20:00 MSK (UTC+4)		[ Summary]	Ryazantsev 58'; Natcho 68'	Stadium: Arena Khimki; Attendance: 8,603; Referee: Maksim Layushkin

30 October 2011 29	Tom Tomsk	0–2	Dynamo	Tomsk
14:00 MSK (UTC+4)		[ Summary]	Misimović 28'; Kurányi 39'; Granat (yellow card) 24' (yellow-red card) 65'	Stadium: Trud Stadium; Attendance: 8,200; Referee: Vladimir Kazmenko

5 November 2011 30	Dynamo	1–1	Spartak Moscow	Moscow
18:30 MSK (UTC+4)	Kurányi 39'	[ Summary]	McGeady 57'; Carioca (yellow card) 32' (yellow-red card) 64'	Stadium: Arena Khimki; Attendance: 18,636; Referee: Aleksei Nikolaev

Pos	Team	Pld	W	D	L	GF	GA	GD	Pts	Qualification
1	Zenit St. Petersburg	30	17	10	3	59	25	+34	61	Qualification to Championship group
2	CSKA Moscow	30	16	11	3	58	29	+29	59	Qualification to Championship group
3	Dynamo Moscow	30	16	7	7	51	30	+21	55	Qualification to Championship group
4	Spartak Moscow	30	15	8	7	48	33	+15	53 (Note: Spartak Moscow ahead of Lokomotiv Moscow on head-to-head points; Lokomotiv Moscow–Spartak Moscow 0–2, Spartak Moscow–Lokomotiv Moscow 3–0.)	Qualification to Championship group
5	Lokomotiv Moscow	30	15	8	7	49	30	+19	53	Qualification to Championship group

Source: Russian Premier League
Rules for classification: 1) points; 2) number of wins; 3) head-to-head points; 4) number of head-to-head wins; 5) head-to-head goal difference; 6) number of head-to-head goals scored; 7) number of head-to-head away goals scored; 8) goal difference; 9) number of goals scored; 10) number of away goals scored.

===== Championship group =====
20 November 2011 31	Dynamo	2–1	Kuban Krasnodar	Moscow
14:00 MSK (UTC+4)	Semshov 19'; Kokorin 27'	[ Summary]	Bugayev 59'	Stadium: Arena Khimki; Attendance: 6,144; Referee: Mikhail Vilkov

26 November 2011 32	Rubin Kazan	2–0	Dynamo	Kazan, Tatarstan
18:30 MSK (UTC+4)	R.Eremenko 4'; Karadeniz 22'; Bocchetti (red card) 78'	[ Summary]		Stadium: Central Stadium; Attendance: 16,120; Referee: Vitali Meshkov

5 March 2012 33	Dynamo	0–1	Anzhi Makhachkala	Moscow
19:30 MSK (UTC+4)		[ Summary]	Jucilei 70'	Stadium: Arena Khimki; Attendance: 9,600; Referee: Vladimir Kazmenko

9 March 2012 34	CSKA	1–1	Dynamo	Moscow
14:00 MSK (UTC+4)	Doumbia 3'	[ Summary]	Semshov 75'	Stadium: Luzhniki Stadium; Attendance: 11,054; Referee: Mikhail Vilkov

16 March 2012 35	Dynamo	1–5	Zenit Saint Petersburg	Moscow
19:00 MSK (UTC+4)	Kurányi 72'	[ Summary]	Criscito 14'; Kerzhakov 15', 75'; Semak 24'; Huszti 79'	Stadium: Arena Khimki; Attendance: 10,684; Referee: Aleksey Yeskov

25 March 2012 36	Dynamo	1–3	Spartak Moscow	Moscow
15:00 MSK (UTC+4)	Samedov 45'	[ Summary]	Emenike 30'; Noboa 70' (o.g.); Ari 90+1'	Stadium: Arena Khimki; Attendance: 15,487; Referee: Sergei Karasev

1 April 2012 37	Lokomotiv Moscow	0–2	Dynamo	Moscow
18:30 MSK (UTC+4)		[ Summary]	Kokorin 43'; Misimović 88' (pen.)	Stadium: Lokomotiv Stadium; Attendance: 15,640; Referee: Aleksei Nikolaev

7 April 2012 38	Dynamo	1–1	Rubin Kazan	Moscow
15:00 MSK (UTC+4)	Misimović 10'	[1 Summary]	Valdez 68'	Stadium: Arena Khimki; Attendance: 6,833; Referee: Sergey Lapochkin

15 April 2012 39	Anzhi Makhachkala	0–1	Dynamo	Makhachkala, Dagestan
18:30 MSK (UTC+4)		[ Summary]	Rykov 37'	Stadium: Dynamo Stadium; Attendance: 15,100; Referee: Aleksandr Egorov

21 April 2012 40	Dynamo	1–0	CSKA	Moscow
16:30 MSK (UTC+4)	Misimović 19'	[ Summary]		Stadium: Arena Khimki; Attendance: 15,337; Referee: Sergei Karasev

27 April 2012 41	Zenit Saint Petersburg	2–1	Dynamo	Saint Petersburg
20:15 MSK (UTC+4)	Shirokov 30'; Kerzhakov 36'; Zyryanov (yellow card) 45' (yellow-red card) 55'	[ Summary]	Epureanu 43'	Stadium: Petrovsky Stadium; Attendance: 20,000; Referee: Vitali Meshkov

2 May 2012 42	Spartak Moscow	1–1	Dynamo	Moscow
18:30 MSK (UTC+4)	Ari 48'	[ Summary]	Kurányi 3'	Stadium: Luzhniki Stadium; Attendance: 14,640; Referee: Aleksey Yeskov

6 May 2012 43	Dynamo	2–2	Lokomotiv Moscow	Moscow
14:00 MSK (UTC+4)	Kurányi 47'; Misimović 90+1'	[ Summary]	Belyayev 27'; Glushakov 82'	Stadium: Arena Khimki; Attendance: 10,193; Referee: Aleksei Nikolaev

13 May 2012 44	Kuban Krasnodar	1–1	Dynamo Moscow	Krasnodar, Krasnodar Krai
18:30 MSK (UTC+4)	L.Traoré 10'	[ Summary]	Misimović 90+1'	Stadium: Kuban Stadium; Attendance: 24,400; Referee: Vitali Meshkov

Pos	Team	Pld	W	D	L	GF	GA	GD	Pts	Qualification
1	Zenit St. Petersburg (C)	44	24	16	4	85	40	+45	88	Qualification to Champions League group stage
2	Spartak Moscow	44	21	12	11	69	47	+22	75	Qualification to Champions League play-off round
3	CSKA Moscow	44	19	16	9	72	47	+25	73	Qualification to Europa League play-off round
4	Dynamo Moscow	44	20	12	12	66	50	+16	72	Qualification to Europa League third qualifying round
5	Anzhi Makhachkala	44	19	13	12	54	42	+12	70	Qualification to Europa League second qualifying round
6	Rubin Kazan	44	17	17	10	55	41	+14	68	Qualification to Europa League group stage (Note: Rubin have won the 2011–12 Russian Cup and thus have qualified for the group stage of the 2012–13 UEFA Europa League.)
7	Lokomotiv Moscow	44	18	12	14	59	48	+11	66	
8	Kuban Krasnodar	44	15	16	13	50	45	+5	61	

Source: Russian Premier League
Rules for classification: 1) points; 2) number of wins; 3) head-to-head points; 4) number of head-to-head wins; 5) head-to-head goal difference; 6) number of head-to-head goals scored; 7) number of head-to-head away goals scored; 8) goal difference; 9) number of goals scored; 10) number of away goals scored
(C) Champions

=== Russian Cup 2010–11 ===
20 April 2011 Quarterfinals	Dynamo Moscow	1–2	Rostov	Arena Khimki, Khimki
19:30 MSK (UTC+4)	Sapeta 52'	Report	Grigoryev 32'; Blatnjak 90+2'	Attendance: 5,200; Referee: Mikhail Vilkov

=== Russian Cup 2011–12 ===
17 July 2011 Round of 32	Mordovia Saransk	0–5	Dynamo Moscow	Start Stadium, Saransk
18:00 MSK (UTC+4)		Report	Semshov 37'; Voronin 66'; Kokorin 71'; Karyaka 79', 90'	Attendance: 7,500; Referee: Igor Egorov

21 September 2011 Round of 16	Dynamo Moscow	1–0 aet	Anzhi Makhachkala	Arena Khimki, Khimki
19:00 MSK (UTC+4)	Kokorin 103'	Summary		Attendance: 11,262; Referee: Eduard Malyi

21 March 2012 Quarterfinal	Zenit Saint Petersburg	0–1	Dynamo Moscow	Petrovsky Stadium, Saint Petersburg
20:30 MSK (UTC+4)		Report	Misimović 73' (pen.)	Attendance: 19,600; Referee: Aleksandr Yegorov

11 April 2012 Semifinal	Dynamo Moscow	2–1	Volga Nizhny Novgorod	BSA Dynamo, Moscow
20:00 MSK (UTC+4)	Misimović 73' (pen.); Voronin 86'	Report	Karyaka 19'	Attendance: 8,754; Referee: Maksim Layushkin

9 May 2012 Final	Dynamo Moscow	0–1	Rubin	Central Stadium, Yekaterinburg
15:00 MSK (UTC+4)		Report	R.Eremenko 78'	Attendance: 27,000; Referee: Mikhail Vilkov

== Statistics ==
=== Appearances and goals ===
As of 31 May 2012

No.	Pos	Nat	Player	Total		Premier League		2010–11 Russian Cup		2011–12 Russian Cup	
No.	Pos	Nat	Player	Apps	Goals	Apps	Goals	Apps	Goals	Apps	Goals
1	GK	(Russia) RUS	Anton Shunin	47	0	41+0	0	1+0	0	5+0	0
2	DF	(Russia) RUS	Vladimir Kisenkov	1	0	1+0	0	0+0	0	0+0	0
4	DF	(Belarus) BLR	Igor Shitov	3	0	1+1	0	0+0	0	1+0	0
5	DF	(Moldova) MDA	Alexandru Epureanu	17	1	6+8	1	0+0	0	0+3	0
6	DF	(Argentina) ARG	Leandro Fernández	48	2	42+0	2	1+0	0	5+0	0
7	MF	(Hungary) HUN	Balázs Dzsudzsák	12	0	8+1	0	0+0	0	3+0	0
8	MF	(Bosnia and Herzegovina) BIH	Zvjezdan Misimović	40	10	19+16	8	0+1	0	3+1	2
9	FW	(Russia) RUS	Aleksandr Kokorin	41	7	26+11	5	0+0	0	1+3	2
10	FW	(Ukraine) UKR	Andriy Voronin	42	13	28+9	11	1+0	0	3+1	2
12	MF	(Belarus) BLR	Pavel Nyakhaychyk	8	1	4+3	1	0+0	0	1+0	0
13	DF	(Russia) RUS	Vladimir Granat	45	0	39+0	0	1+0	0	5+0	0
14	MF	(Russia) RUS	Artur Yusupov	30	1	18+8	1	0+0	0	4+0	0
16	GK	(Russia) RUS	Yevgeni Frolov	1	0	0+1	0	0+0	0	0+0	0
18	GK	(Armenia) ARM	Roman Berezovsky	3	0	3+0	0	0+0	0	0+0	0
19	FW	(Russia) RUS	Aleksandr Samedov	49	6	42+1	6	1+0	0	5+0	0
21	MF	(Russia) RUS	Igor Semshov	42	13	36+1	12	1+0	0	4+0	1
22	FW	(Germany) GER	Kevin Kurányi	47	13	40+1	13	1+0	0	5+0	0
23	DF	(Australia) AUS	Luke Wilkshire	43	0	39+0	0	1+0	0	3+0	0
26	MF	(Ecuador) ECU	Christian Noboa	13	0	10+1	0	0+0	0	2+0	0
27	FW	(Russia) RUS	Fyodor Smolov	24	2	5+18	2	0+0	0	0+1	0
32	DF	(Serbia) SRB	Marko Lomić	39	1	36+0	1	1+0	0	2+0	0
33	DF	(Russia) RUS	Vladimir Rykov	13	1	9+2	1	0+0	0	2+0	0
41	MF	(Russia) RUS	Aleksandr Sapeta	36	3	15+17	2	1+0	1	0+3	0
59	MF	(Russia) RUS	Aleksandr Ilyin	1	0	0+1	0	0+0	0	0+0	0
77	FW	(Russia) RUS	Irakli Logua	0	0	0+0	0	0+0	0	0+0	0
Players who left Dynamo during season:
7	MF	(Russia) RUS	Andrei Karyaka	12	2	6+5	0	0+0	0	0+1	2
17	MF	(Russia) RUS	Alan Gatagov	0	0	0+0	0	0+0	0	0+0	0
18	MF	(Croatia) CRO	Tomislav Dujmović	9	0	6+3	0	0+0	0	0+0	0
20	MF	(Romania) ROU	Adrian Ropotan	11	0	2+8	0	1+0	0	0+0	0
25	DF	(Russia) RUS	Denis Kolodin	3	0	2+1	0	0+0	0	0+0	0
30	GK	(Russia) RUS	Vladimir Gabulov	0	0	0+0	0	0+0	0	0+0	0

=== Scorers and assistants ===
As of 31 May 2012

Place	Position	Nation	Number	Name	League goals	League assists	Cup goals	Cup assists	Total
1	FW	(Germany)	22	Kevin Kurányi	13	9	0	1	23
2	FW	(Ukraine)	10	Andriy Voronin	11	8	2	0	21
3	MF	(Russia)	21	Igor Semshov	12	4	1	1	18
4	FW	(Russia)	19	Aleksandr Samedov	6	11	0	1	18
5	MF	(Bosnia and Herzegovina)	8	Zvjezdan Misimović	8	5	2	1	16
6	FW	(Russia)	9	Aleksandr Kokorin	5	2	2	0	9
7	MF	(Russia)	41	Aleksandr Sapeta	2	0	1	0	3
8	FW	(Russia)	27	Fyodor Smolov	2	1	0	0	3
9	DF	(Serbia)	32	Marko Lomić	1	2	0	0	3
10	MF	(Hungary)	7	Balázs Dzsudzsák	0	3	0	0	3
11	DF	(Argentina)	6	Leandro Fernández	2	0	0	0	2
11	MF	(Russia)	7	Andrei Karyaka	0	0	2	0	2
13	DF	(Moldova)	5	Alexandru Epureanu	1	0	0	0	1
13	MF	(Belarus)	12	Pavel Nyakhaychyk	1	0	0	0	1
13	MF	(Russia)	14	Artur Yusupov	1	0	0	0	1
13	DF	(Russia)	33	Vladimir Rykov	1	0	0	0	1
17	DF	(Russia)	13	Vladimir Granat	0	1	0	0	1
17	DF	(Australia)	23	Luke Wilkshire	0	1	0	0	1
17	MF	(Ecuador)	26	Christian Noboa	0	1	0	0	1
				TOTALS	33	27	3	3	80

=== Disciplinary record ===
As of 31 May 2012

Number	Nation	Position	Name	Russian Premier League		Russian Cup		Total	
Number	Nation	Position	Name	Booked	Sent off (straight red)	Booked	Sent off (straight red)	Booked	Sent off (straight red)
1	(Russia)	GK	Anton Shunin	1	0	0	0	1	0
5	(Moldova)	DF	Alexandru Epureanu	2	0	0	0	2	0
6	(Argentina)	DF	Leandro Fernández	11	0	0	0	11	0
7	(Russia)	MF	Andrei Karyaka	1	0	0	0	1	0
7	(Hungary)	MF	Balázs Dzsudzsák	3	0	0	0	3	0
8	(Bosnia and Herzegovina)	MF	Zvjezdan Misimović	2	0	0	0	2	0
9	(Russia)	FW	Aleksandr Kokorin	3	1	1	0	4	1
10	(Ukraine)	FW	Andriy Voronin	5	0	0	0	5	0
13	(Russia)	DF	Vladimir Granat	9	2	1	0	10	2
14	(Russia)	MF	Artur Yusupov	5	0	2	0	7	0
18	(Croatia)	MF	Tomislav Dujmović	2	0	0	0	2	0
19	(Russia)	FW	Aleksandr Samedov	4	0	0	0	4	0
20	(Romania)	MF	Adrian Ropotan	3	0	3	0	3	0
21	(Russia)	MF	Igor Semshov	7	1	2	0	9	1
22	(Germany)	FW	Kevin Kurányi	10	0	0	0	10	0
23	(Australia)	DF	Luke Wilkshire	14	0	2	0	16	0
26	(Ecuador)	MF	Christian Noboa	1	0	0	0	1	0
27	(Russia)	FW	Fyodor Smolov	1	0	0	0	1	0
32	(Serbia)	DF	Marko Lomić	7	0	2	0	9	0
33	(Russia)	DF	Vladimir Rykov	4	0	1	0	5	0
41	(Russia)	MF	Aleksandr Sapeta	4	0	1	0	5	0
			TOTALS	99	4	12	0	111	4

== Transfers winter 2010–11 ==
In: Note: Flags indicate national team as defined under FIFA eligibility rules; some limited exceptions apply. Players may hold more than one non-FIFA nationality.

No.	Pos.	Nation	Player
3	DF	FIN	Boris Rotenberg (from (Russia) Zenit St. Petersburg)
7	MF	RUS	Andrei Karyaka (from (Russia) Saturn Moscow Oblast)
8	MF	BIH	Zvjezdan Misimović (from (Turkey) Galatasaray)
14	MF	RUS	Artur Yusupov (end of loan to (Russia) Khimki)
27	FW	RUS	Fyodor Smolov (end of loan to (Netherlands) Feyenoord)
35	GK	RUS	Roman Khalanchuk (from (Russia) KUZBASS Kemerovo)
41	MF	RUS	Aleksandr Sapeta (from (Russia) Saturn Moscow Oblast)
49	MF	RUS	Igor Khokhlov (from (Russia) Nika Moscow)
54	GK	RUS	Yegor Generalov (from (Russia) Lokomotiv Moscow)
56	MF	RUS	Vladimir Sobolev (from (Russia) Saturn Moscow Oblast)
57	DF	RUS	Denis Rykhovskiy
70	MF	RUS	Roman Yeremeyev (from (Russia) Akademiya Togliatti)
72	MF	RUS	Vladimir Torshentsev (from (Russia) Saturn Moscow Oblast)
79	MF	RUS	Karen Akopyan (from (Russia) Luch-Energiya Vladivostok)
86	MF	KOR	He Minen
89	FW	RUS	Yevgeni Kuklin
93	FW	RUS	Andrei Panyukov
95	MF	RUS	Mikhail Zhabkin
98	DF	RUS	Soslan Takazov
99	FW	RUS	Timur Kalizhanov

Out: Note: Flags indicate national team as defined under FIFA eligibility rules; some limited exceptions apply. Players may hold more than one non-FIFA nationality.

No.	Pos.	Nation	Player
3	MF	RUS	Aleksei Rebko (to (Russia) Rostov)
4	DF	POL	Marcin Kowalczyk (on loan to (Ukraine) Metalurh Donetsk)
8	MF	RUS	Dmitri Khokhlov (retired)
26	FW	SVK	Martin Jakubko (to (Slovakia) Dukla Banská Bystrica)
34	GK	RUS	Sergei Panov (to (Russia) Vityaz Podolsk)
37	DF	RUS	Aleksandr Lobkov (to (Russia) Khimik Dzerzhinsk)
44	MF	RUS	Grigori Yevstegneyev (to (Russia) Istra)
46	DF	RUS	Aleksandr Bortnik (released)
49	DF	RUS	Aleksandr Karakin (released)
57	MF	RUS	Vladimir Rykhovskiy (to (Russia) Metallurg Lipetsk)
63	DF	RUS	Anton Rudakov (on loan to (Russia) Dynamo Stavropol)
66	MF	RUS	Yevgeni Frolov (released)
70	MF	RUS	Dmitri Tikhonov (to (Russia) Tom Tomsk)
73	MF	RUS	Yuri Petrakov (to (Moldova) Sheriff Tiraspol)
77	FW	RUS	Irakli Logua (on loan to (Russia) Fakel Voronezh)
79	FW	RUS	Andrei Ornat (released)
80	FW	RUS	Ruslan Pashtov (to (Russia) Volga Nizhny Novgorod)
81	MF	RUS	Andrei Zharkov (released)
88	FW	LTU	Edgaras Česnauskis (to (Russia) Rostov)
89	FW	RUS	Aleksandr Bebikh (to (Russia) Dynamo Stavropol)
92	FW	RUS	Vadim Pronkin (released)
95	MF	RUS	Artyom Katashevsky (released)
—	GK	RUS	Aleksei Karasevich (to (Russia) Lokomotiv-2 Moscow, previously on loan to (Russia) Nara-ShBFR Naro-Fominsk)
—	DF	RUS	Nikita Chicherin (on loan to (Russia) Sibir Novosibirsk, previously on loan to (Russia) Khimki)
—	DF	RUS	Sergei Terekhov (on loan to (Russia) Baltika Kaliningrad, previously on loan to (Russia) Khimki)
—	MF	URU	Luis Aguiar (on loan to (Uruguay) Peñarol, previously on loan at (Portugal) Sporting de Braga)
—	MF	RUS	Yuri Kirillov (on loan to (Russia) Krylia Sovetov Samara, previously on loan to (Russia) Alania Vladikavkaz)
—	MF	RUS	Viktor Svezhov (to (Russia) Luch-Energiya Vladivostok, previously on loan to (Russia) Tom Tomsk)
—	MF	RUS	Nail Zamaliyev (to (Moldova) Sheriff Tiraspol, previously on loan to (Russia) Salyut Belgorod)
—	FW	BUL	Tsvetan Genkov (to (Poland) Wisła Kraków, previously on loan to (Bulgaria) Lokomotiv Sofia)
—	FW	RUS	Roman Panin (released, previously on loan to (Russia) Irtysh Omsk)

== Transfers summer 2011 ==
In: Note: Flags indicate national team as defined under FIFA eligibility rules; some limited exceptions apply. Players may hold more than one non-FIFA nationality.

No.	Pos.	Nation	Player
4	DF	BLR	Igor Shitov (from (Belarus) BATE Borisov)
12	MF	BLR	Pavel Nyakhaychyk (from (Belarus) BATE Borisov)
16	GK	RUS	Yevgeni Frolov (from (Russia) Mordovia Saransk)
17	MF	RUS	Alan Gatagov (from (Russia) Lokomotiv Moscow)
33	DF	RUS	Vladimir Rykov (from (Russia) KAMAZ Naberezhnye Chelny)
45	MF	UKR	Borys Taschy (from (Latvia) Olimps)
59	MF	RUS	Aleksandr Ilyin
65	MF	RUS	Kirill Zubkov (from (Russia) Saturn-2 Moscow Oblast)
73	MF	RUS	Aleksandr Tashayev
74	MF	RUS	Anatoli Katrich
76	DF	RUS	Anton Ivanov
80	MF	SRB	Marko Jevtović

Out: Note: Flags indicate national team as defined under FIFA eligibility rules; some limited exceptions apply. Players may hold more than one non-FIFA nationality.

No.	Pos.	Nation	Player
20	MF	ROU	Adrian Ropotan (on loan to (Russia) Tom Tomsk)
30	GK	RUS	Vladimir Gabulov (to (Russia) Anzhi Makhachkala)
50	DF	MNE	Nemanja Mijušković (on loan to (Russia) Amkar Perm)
85	FW	KOR	Lee Min-Kyu (released)
86	MF	KOR	He Minen (released)
87	DF	RUS	Aleksandr Kuzminov (released)
98	DF	RUS	Soslan Takazov (to (Russia) Alania Vladikavkaz)
—	DF	POL	Marcin Kowalczyk (to (Poland) Zagłębie Lubin, previously on loan to (Ukraine) Metalurh Donetsk)
—	MF	URU	Luis Aguiar (to (Portugal) Sporting, previously on loan to (Uruguay) Peñarol)

== Transfers winter 2011–12 ==
In: Note: Flags indicate national team as defined under FIFA eligibility rules; some limited exceptions apply. Players may hold more than one non-FIFA nationality.

No.	Pos.	Nation	Player
11	MF	HUN	Balázs Dzsudzsák (from (Russia) Anzhi Makhachkala)
18	GK	ARM	Roman Berezovsky (from (Russia) Khimki)
26	MF	ECU	Christian Noboa (from (Russia) Rubin Kazan)
37	MF	RUS	Sergei Terekhov (end of loan to (Russia) Baltika Kaliningrad)
77	MF	RUS	Irakli Logua (end of loan to (Russia) Fakel Voronezh)
99	FW	RUS	Aleksandr Bebikh (end of loan to (Russia) Dynamo Stavropol)

Out: Note: Flags indicate national team as defined under FIFA eligibility rules; some limited exceptions apply. Players may hold more than one non-FIFA nationality.

No.	Pos.	Nation	Player
3	DF	RUS	Boris Rotenberg (on loan to (Russia) Kuban Krasnodar)
7	MF	RUS	Andrei Karyaka (to (Russia) Volga Nizhny Novgorod)
17	MF	RUS	Alan Gatagov (on loan to (Russia) Tom Tomsk)
18	MF	CRO	Tomislav Dujmović (on loan to (Spain) Real Zaragoza)
25	DF	RUS	Denis Kolodin (on loan to (Russia) Rostov)
57	MF	RUS	Denis Rykhovskiy (released)
75	GK	RUS	Ivan Shubkin (released)
78	MF	RUS	Vladimir Shpyryov (to (Russia) Kaluga)
80	MF	SRB	Marko Jevtović (released)
89	FW	RUS	Yevgeni Kuklin (released)
99	FW	RUS	Timur Kalimzhanov (released)
—	DF	RUS	Nikita Chicherin (to (Russia) Volga Nizhny Novgorod, previously on loan to (Russia) Sibir Novosibirsk)
—	DF	RUS	Anton Rudakov (on loan to (Russia) Rusichi Oryol, previously on loan to (Russia) Dynamo Stavropol)
—	MF	RUS	Yuri Kirillov (on loan to (Russia) Ural Sverdlovsk Oblast, previously on loan to (Russia) Krylia Sovetov Samara)
—	MF	RUS	Viktor Svezhov (to (Russia) Krylia Sovetov Samara, previously on loan to (Russia) Luch-Energiya Vladivostok)

== Youth team ==
The FC Dynamo Moscow youth team participated in Youth Championship (March–November 2011) and Youth Tournament of Championship group (November 2011 – May 2012).

=== Matches and results ===
==== Legend ====
Win Draw Loss

==== Results by matchday ====
===== Youth Championship 2011 =====
Round	1	2	3	4	5	6	7	8	9	10	11	12	13	14	15	16	17	18	19	20	21	22	23	24	25	26	27	28	29	30
Ground	A	H	A	H	A	H	A	H	A	H	A	H	A	H	A	H	A	H	A	H	A	H	A	H	A	H	A	H	A	H
Result	D	D	D	W	D	W	D	D	L	W	W	D	L	W	W	L	W	D	L	W	W	W	L	W	L	W	W	D	W	L
Position	8	2	2	3	4	2	1	2	5	5	1	2	1	3	7	4	6	8	10	8	6	7	8	8	5	6	4	7	5	4

Source: Matches
A = Away; H = Home; W = Win; D = Draw; L = Loss

===== Youth Tournament of Championship group 2012 =====
Round	1	2	3	4	5	6	7	8	9	10	11	12	13	14
Ground	H	A	H	A	H	H	A	H	A	H	A	A	H	A
Result	D	D	W	W	W	L	W	L	W	W	W	W	W	W
Position	3	4	4	2	2	2	2	2	2	2	2	1	1	1

Source: Matches
A = Away; H = Home; W = Win; D = Draw; L = Loss

=== Youth squad ===
The following players were registered with the RFPL and listed by club's website as youth players. They were eligible to play for the first team.

As of 31 May 2012

Number	Nation	Position	Name	Matches	Goal	Clean sheets	Booked	Sent off (straight red)
31	(Russia)	GK	Yevgeni Puzin	16	−11	9	0	0
54	(Russia)	GK	Yegor Generalov	12	−13	4	1	0
35	(Russia)	GK	Roman Khalanchuk	6	−4	2	0	0
55	(Russia)	DF	Nikita Sergeyev	41	0		14	0
61	(Russia)	DF	Pavel Yevseyev	29	0		5	1
76	(Russia)	DF	Anton Ivanov	24	0		2	1
98	(Russia)	DF	Soslan Takazov	15	2		5	1
94	(Russia)	DF	Dmitri Zhivoglyadov	14	0		1	0
50	(Montenegro)	DF	Nemanja Mijušković	14	0		1	0
57	(Russia)	DF	Vladimir Rykhovskiy	13	0		1	0
44	(Russia)	DF	Artyom Yarmolitsky	9	0		0	0
87	(Russia)	DF	Aleksandr Kuzminov	3	0		0	0
97	(Russia)	MF	Vitali Komisov	37	8		10	1
90	(Russia)	MF	Ivan Solovyov	34	4		6	0
47	(Russia)	MF	Oleg Valov	27	2		2	0
79	(Russia)	MF	Karen Akopyan	23	2		0	0
56	(Russia)	MF	Vladimir Sobolev	22	5		8	0
59	(Russia)	MF	Aleksandr Ilyin	22	3		3	0
70	(Russia)	MF	Roman Yeremeyev	18	3		6	1
45	(Ukraine)	MF	Borys Tashchy	18	1		1	0
95	(Russia)	MF	Mikhail Zhabkin	12	0		0	0
17	(Russia)	MF	Alan Gatagov	11	4		2	0
72	(Russia)	MF	Vladimir Torshentsev	11	1		0	0
42	(Russia)	MF	Artyom Katashevsky	11	0		0	0
78	(Russia)	MF	Vladimir Shpyryov	8	1		0	0
37	(Russia)	MF	Sergei Terekhov	5	1		4	0
74	(Russia)	MF	Anatoli Katrich	4	0		0	0
49	(Russia)	MF	Igor Khokhlov	4	0		0	0
73	(Russia)	MF	Aleksandr Tashayev	3	1		0	0
80	(Serbia)	MF	Marko Jevtović	2	0		0	0
86	(South Korea)	MF	He Minen	1	0		1	0
58	(Russia)	FW	Dmitri Otstavnov	39	18		4	0
93	(Russia)	FW	Andrei Panyukov	22	16		2	0
69	(Russia)	FW	Yevgeni Kuklin	16	0		0	0
96	(Russia)	FW	Timur Kalizhanov	7	0		0	0
77	(Russia)	FW	Irakli Logua	1	1		1	0
Players from the first team who featured for youth team (according to rules, up to 4 players including goalkeeper per match):
16	(Russia)	GK	Yevgeni Frolov	15	−13	6	0	0
1	(Russia)	GK	Anton Shunin	1	−1	0	0	0
3	(Finland)	DF	Boris Rotenberg	23	0		8	0
5	(Moldova)	DF	Alexandru Epureanu	10	1		0	0
4	(Belarus)	DF	Igor Shitov	7	1		2	0
25	(Russia)	DF	Denis Kolodin	6	1		0	0
33	(Russia)	DF	Vladimir Rykov	6	0		2	0
2	(Russia)	DF	Vladimir Kisenkov	4	1		1	0
14	(Russia)	MF	Artur Yusupov	14	1		1	0
41	(Russia)	MF	Aleksandr Sapeta	9	0		3	0
18	(Croatia)	MF	Tomislav Dujmović	6	2		1	0
12	(Belarus)	MF	Pavel Nyakhaychyk	6	1		0	0
7	(Russia)	MF	Andrei Karyaka	6	1		0	0
21	(Russia)	MF	Igor Semshov	3	0		2	0
20	(Romania)	MF	Adrian Ropotan	1	0		0	0
27	(Russia)	FW	Fyodor Smolov	21	8		0	0
9	(Russia)	FW	Aleksandr Kokorin	6	5		2	0
10	(Ukraine)	FW	Andriy Voronin	2	0		1	0
