= 2012–13 FC Dynamo Moscow season =

Dynamo Moscow
2012–13 season
- Manager: Dan Petrescu (from 20 August 2012)
- Stadium: Arena Khimki, Khimki, Russia (capacity 18,636)
- Premier League: 7th
- Russian Cup: Quarter-final vs Anzhi
- Europa League: Playoff round vs Stuttgart
- Top goalscorer: League: Aleksandr Kokorin (10); All: Aleksandr Kokorin (13)
- Highest home attendance: 16,284 vs CSKA; League, 12 April 2013
- Lowest home attendance: 2,283 vs Khimki; Cup, 31 October 2012
- Average home league attendance: 7,729
Home colours	Away colours

The 2012–13 Dynamo Moscow season was the 90th season in the club's history. They participated in the Russian Premier League, finishing in 7th place, the Russian Cup, where they reached the Quarterfinal before losing to Anzhi Makhachkala, and the Europa League where they were eliminated at the Playoff round by Stuttgart.

== Review and events ==
During the season, three managers worked with the first team:
Sergei Silkin worked at pre-season training, but resigned after the team was beaten on Matchday 3 by arch-rival Spartak 0–4 and sank to the bottom of the league table. This match was 9th in the row without victory, previous season included.

Dmitri Khokhlov was in charge as a caretaker manager for 3 games and brought home the first victory of the season – 5–0 over Dundee Utd in Europa League.
Dan Petrescu came in when the team was still 16th but managed to lift it to 9th position before winter break. In the spring Dynamo even made it temporarily to the Europa League spot, but failure to win the last game versus Volga at home lowered their final league position to 7th with no European football next season.

Kevin Kurányi started season as a captain of Dynamo Moscow. After arrival of Dan Petrescu as a new manager, captain's functions were delegated also to Igor Semshov, Leandro Fernández and Aleksandr Kokorin.

== Matches and results ==
=== Legend ===
Win Draw Loss Postponed

=== Russian Premier League ===
==== Results by matchday ====
Round	1	2	3	4	5	6	7	8	9	10	11	12	13	14	15	16	17	18	19	20	21	22	23	24	25	26	27	28	29	30
Ground	A	A	H	A	H	A	H	A	H	A	H	A	H	A	H	H	A	H	A	H	A	H	A	H	A	H	A	H	A	H
Result	L	L	L	L	L	W	L	L	W	W	L	W	W	L	W	W	W	W	W	W	D	W	D	D	D	W	W	D	L	D
Position	14	16	16	16	16	16	16	16	14	12	13	12	11	11	10	10	9	9	9	7	7	5	5	6	6	6	4	4	6	7

Updated to match(es) played on 20 May 2013. Source: Matches
A = Away; H = Home; W = Win; D = Draw; L = Loss

==== Matches ====
21 July 2012 1	Volga	1–0	Dynamo Moscow	Nizhny Novgorod, Nizhny Novgorod Oblast
16:30 MSK (UTC+4)	Maksimov (red card) 51'; Shulenin 69'	Summary		Stadium: Lokomotiv Stadium; Attendance: 6,100; Referee: Sergey Lapochkin

28 July 2012 2	Zenit Saint Petersburg	2–0	Dynamo Moscow	Saint Petersburg
14:30 MSK (UTC+4)	Kerzhakov 10'; Criscito 71'	Summary		Stadium: Petrovsky Stadium; Attendance: 20,068; Referee: Vitaly Meshkov

4 August 2012 3	Dynamo Moscow	0–4	Spartak Moscow	Moscow
21:00 MSK (UTC+4)	Noboa (yellow card) 69' (yellow-red card) 76'	Summary	Bilyaletdinov 23'; Pareja 49'; Ananidze 75'; Rafael Carioca 90+3'	Stadium: Arena Khimki; Attendance: 15,209; Referee: Maxim Layushkin

12 August 2012 4	Rubin Kazan	2–0	Dynamo Moscow	Kazan, Tatarstan
19:00 MSK (UTC+4)	Natcho 78'; Eremenko 90+2'	Summary		Stadium: Central Stadium; Attendance: 17,467; Referee: Vladimir Kazmenko

18 August 2012 5	Dynamo Moscow	1–2	Terek Grozny	Moscow
16:00 MSK (UTC+4)	Dzsudzsák 75'; Rykov (red card) 82'; Kurányi (red card) 90+2'	Summary	Rybus 30'; N'Douassel (red card) 53'; Rybus 83'	Stadium: Arena Khimki; Attendance: 5,836; Referee: Aleksey Eskov

25 August 2012 6	Lokomotiv Moscow	2–3	Dynamo Moscow	Moscow
13:30 MSK (UTC+4)	Maicon 21'; N'Doye 65'	Summary	Kokorin 12'; Dzsudzsák 59'; Noboa 68'	Stadium: Lokomotiv Stadium; Attendance: 12,380; Referee: Sergey Lapochkin

1 September 2012 7	Dynamo Moscow	1–2	Kuban Krasnodar	Moscow
16:00 MSK (UTC+4)	Noboa 45+2'	Summary	Fidler 65'; Özbiliz 90+3'	Stadium: Arena Khimki; Attendance: 11,058; Referee: Sergey Karasev

15 September 2012 8	FC Rostov	1–0	Dynamo Moscow	Rostov, Rostov Oblast
20:00 MSK (UTC+4)	Holenda 62'	Summary		Stadium: Olimp – 2 Attendance: 14,000; Referee: Vladislav Bezborodov

22 September 2012 9	Dynamo Moscow	3–2	Amkar Perm	Moscow
15:45 MSK (UTC+4)	Jantscher 30'; Kurányi 78'; Kokorin 83'	Summary	Jakubko 25'; Cherenchikov (red card) 37'; Breznaník 90+2'	Stadium: Arena Khimki; Attendance: 4,134; Referee: Aleksey Nikolaev

30 September 2012 10	CSKA Moscow	0–2	Dynamo Moscow	Moscow
13:30 MSK (UTC+4)	Dzagoev (red card) 58'	Summary	Dzsudzsák 38'; Kokorin 51'	Stadium: Luzhniki Stadium; Attendance: 12,000; Referee: Sergey Karasev

6 October 2012 11	Dynamo Moscow	0–2	Anzhi Makhachkala	Moscow
13:30 MSK (UTC+4)	Schildenfeld (red card) 52'	Summary	João Carlos (red card) 9'; Zhirkov 75'; Eto'o 87'	Stadium: Arena Khimki; Attendance: 7,712; Referee: Aleksandr Egorov

20 October 2012 12	Mordovia Saransk	1–2	Dynamo Moscow	Saransk
17:45 MSK (UTC+4)	Mukhametshin 60' (pen.)	Summary	Kokorin 6', 63'	Stadium: Start Stadium; Attendance: 7,500; Referee: Vassili Kazartsev

27 October 2012 13	Dynamo Moscow	1–0	Krylia Sovetov	Moscow
13:30 MSK (UTC+4)	Kokorin 13'	Summary		Stadium: Arena Khimki; Attendance: 3,107; Referee: Aleksei Nikolaev

3 November 2012 14	FC Krasnodar	2–0	Dynamo Moscow	Krasnodar, Krasnodar Krai
18:00 MSK (UTC+4)	Wánderson 37'; Konaté 90+2'	Summary		Stadium: Kuban Stadium; Attendance: 6,500; Referee: Vladimir Kazmenko

10 November 2012 15	Dynamo Moscow	2–0	Alania Vladikavkaz	Moscow
13:30 MSK (UTC+4)	Kurányi 27', 85'	Summary		Stadium: Arena Khimki; Attendance: 3,479; Referee: Aleksandr Egorov

17 November 2012 16	Dynamo Moscow	3–0	Zenit Saint Petersburg	Moscow
16:00 MSK (UTC+4)	Granat 27'	Summary		Stadium: Arena Khimki; Attendance: 11,122; Referee: Aleksei Nikolaev
Note: The match was stopped in the 36th minute at 1–0 due to riots on the terraces, and Dynamo were awarded a 3–0 win.

24 November 2012 17	Spartak Moscow	1–5	Dynamo Moscow	Moscow
13:30 MSK (UTC+4)	Dzyuba 90+2'	Summary	Kokorin 15', 45+1'; Noboa 18'; Semshov 80', 88'	Stadium: Luzhniki Stadium; Attendance: 13,856; Referee: Maksim Layushkin

1 December 2012 18	Dynamo Moscow	3–0	Rubin Kazan	Moscow
13:30 MSK (UTC+4)	Yusupov 20'; Dzsudzsák 30'; Kurányi 70'	Summary		Stadium: Arena Khimki; Attendance: 0 Referee: Aleksei Eskov
Note: The match was played at closed doors after riots in the previous home game.

8 December 2012 19	Terek Grozny	1–2	Dynamo Moscow	Grozny, Chechnya
13:30 MSK (UTC+4)	Aílton 65'	Summary	Kurányi 12', 68'	Stadium: Sultan Bilimkhanov Stadium; Attendance: 22,500; Referee: Igor Nizovtsev

9 March 2013 20	Dynamo Moscow	1–0	Lokomotiv Moscow	Moscow
13:30 MSK (UTC+4)	Solovyov 20'; Yusupov (red card) 68'	Summary		Stadium: Arena Khimki; Attendance: 11,787; Referee: Vladislav Bezborodov

16 March 2013 21	Kuban Krasnodar	1–1	Dynamo Moscow	Krasnodar, Krasnodar Krai
18:30 MSK (UTC+4)	Baldé 28'	Summary	Kokorin 24'	Stadium: Kuban Stadium; Attendance: 21,500; Referee: Aleksandr Egorov

30 March 2013 22	Dynamo Moscow	1–0	FC Rostov	Moscow
18:30 MSK (UTC+4)	Kurányi 27'	Summary		Stadium: Arena Khimki; Attendance: 6,067; Referee: Aleksei Yeskov

5 April 2013 23	Amkar Perm	1–1	Dynamo Moscow	Perm, Perm Krai
17:00 MSK (UTC+4)	Peev 29' (pen.)	Summary	Noboa 72' (fk)	Stadium: Zvezda Stadium; Attendance: 9,150; Referee: Vladislav Bezborodov

12 April 2013 24	Dynamo Moscow	0–0	CSKA Moscow	Moscow
20:00 MSK (UTC+4)		Summary		Stadium: Arena Khimki; Attendance: 16,284; Referee: Aleksei Nikolaev

21 April 2013 25	Anzhi Makhachkala	3–3	Dynamo Moscow	Kaspiysk, Dagestan
18:30 MSK (UTC+4)	Boussoufa 39'; Boussoufa (red card) 48'; Zhirkov 50'; Eto'o 67'	Summary	Noboa 36'; Gatagov 73'; Kurányi 88'	Stadium: Anzhi-Arena; Attendance: 24,500; Referee: Sergey Lapochkin

27 April 2013 26	Dynamo Moscow	3–1	Mordovia Saransk	Moscow
13:30 MSK (UTC+4)	Yusupov 4'; Kurányi 24', 36'	Summary	Panchenko 28'	Stadium: Arena Khimki; Attendance: 5,124; Referee: Vladislav Bezborodov

5 May 2013 27	Krylia Sovetov Samara	1–2	Dynamo Moscow	Samara, Samara Oblast
13:30 MSK (UTC+4)	Taranov 65'	Summary	Dzsudzsák 5'; Solomatin 61'	Stadium: Metallurg Stadium; Attendance: 16,547; Referee: Vitaly Meshkov

11 May 2013 28	Dynamo Moscow	1–1	FC Krasnodar	Moscow
13:30 MSK (UTC+4)	Kokorin 69'	Summary	Pereyra 52'	Stadium: Arena Khimki; Attendance: 5,864; Referee: Sergey Karasev

19 May 2013 29	Alania Vladikavkaz	1–0	Dynamo Moscow	Vladikavkaz
13:30 MSK (UTC+4)	Priskin 71'; Chanturia (red card) 88'; Neco (red card) 88'	Summary	Kokorin (red card) 88'; Dzsudzsák (red card) 88'	Stadium: Republican Spartak Stadium; Attendance: 5,000; Referee: Sergei Ivanov

26 May 2013 30	Dynamo Moscow	0–0	Volga Nizhny Novgorod	Moscow
13:30 MSK (UTC+4)		Summary		Stadium: Arena Khimki; Attendance: 6,112; Referee: Vladislav Bezborodov

==== Table ====
Pos	Team	Pld	W	D	L	GF	GA	GD	Pts	Qualification or relegation
5	Kuban Krasnodar	30	14	9	7	48	28	+20	51	Qualification for the Europa League third qualifying round
6	Rubin Kazan	30	15	5	10	39	27	+12	50	Qualification for the Europa League second qualifying round
7	Dynamo Moscow	30	14	6	10	41	34	+7	48 (Note: Dynamo Moscow ahead of Terek Grozny on head-to-head points; Dynamo Moscow–Terek Grozny 1–2, Terek Grozny–Dynamo Moscow 1–2.)	
8	Terek Grozny	30	14	6	10	38	40	−2	48	
9	Lokomotiv Moscow	30	12	7	11	39	36	+3	43	

Source: Russian Premier League
Rules for classification: 1) points; 2) number of wins; 3) head-to-head points; 4) number of head-to-head wins; 5) head-to-head goal difference; 6) number of head-to-head goals scored; 7) number of head-to-head away goals scored; 8) goal difference; 9) number of goals scored; 10) number of away goals scored; 11) position in the 2011–12 season (only used until all the regularly scheduled games have been played); 11) extra play-off game or tournament between the teams in question.

=== Russian Cup ===
26 September 2012 Round of 32	Torpedo Moscow	0–3	Dynamo Moscow	Eduard Streltsov Stadium
19:00 MSK (UTC+4)	Boyarintsev 50'	Summary	Rykov 17', 32'	Attendance: 8,000; Referee: Timur Arslanbekov
Note: The game was stopped in the first half and eventually abandoned in the 50th minute due to Torpedo fans throwing fireworks on the field during the celebrations of Boyarintsev's goal. Technical victory 3-0 was later awarded to Dynamo.

31 October 2012 Round of 16	Dynamo Moscow	2–1	FC Khimki	Arena Khimki, Moscow
20:00 MSK (UTC+4)	Kurányi 82'; Panyukov 87'	Summary	Sobolev 55'	Attendance: 2,283; Referee: Vassily Miroshnichenko

17 April 2013 Quarter-finals	Anzhi Makhachkala	1–0 (a.e.t.)	Dynamo Moscow	Anzhi-Arena, Kaspiysk
18:00 MSK (UTC+4)	Eto'o 99' pen	Summary		Attendance: 16,000; Referee: Aleksandr Egorov

=== Europa League ===
==== Third qualifying round ====
2 August 2012 1st leg	Dundee United (Scotland)	2–2	(Russia) Dynamo Moscow	Dundee, Scotland
22:45 MSK (UTC+4)	Flood 37'; Watson 76'	Report	50' Semshov; 90+2' Kokorin	Stadium: Tannadice Park; Attendance: 9.977; Referee: Marius Avram (Romania)

9 August 2012 2nd leg	Dynamo Moscow (Russia)	5–0 (7–2 agg.)	(Scotland) Dundee United	Khimki, Russia
20:00 MSK (UTC+4)	Semshov 2'; Kokorin 23'; Yusupov 40'; Sapeta 83', 89'	Report		Stadium: Arena Khimki; Referee: Stefan Johannesson (Sweden)

==== Playoff round ====
22 August 2012 1st leg	Stuttgart (Germany)	2–0	(Russia) Dynamo Moscow	Stuttgart, Germany
18:15	Ibišević 71', 90+1'	report		Stadium: Mercedes-Benz Arena; Attendance: 20.400; Referee: William Collum (Scotland)

29 August 2012 2nd leg	Dynamo Moscow (Russia)	1–1 (1–3 agg.)	(Germany) Stuttgart	Khimki, Russia
18:00	Kokorin 78'	Report	Ibišević 71'	Stadium: Arena Khimki; Referee: Fırat Aydınus

== Statistics ==
=== Appearances and goals ===
As of 27 May 2013

No.	Pos	Nat	Player	Total		Premier League		Russian Cup		Europa League	
No.	Pos	Nat	Player	Apps	Goals	Apps	Goals	Apps	Goals	Apps	Goals
1	GK	(Russia) RUS	Anton Shunin	28	0	23+0	0	2+0	0	3+0	0
6	DF	(Argentina) ARG	Leandro Fernández	33	0	28+0	0	2+0	0	3+0	0
7	MF	(Hungary) HUN	Balázs Dzsudzsák	32	5	27+0	5	1+0	0	4+0	0
8	FW	(Russia) RUS	Sergei Davydov	9	0	0+8	0	0+1	0	0+0	0
9	FW	(Russia) RUS	Aleksandr Kokorin	26	13	22+0	10	1+0	0	3+0	3
10	MF	(Russia) RUS	Igor Semshov	22	4	10+6	2	2+0	0	2+2	2
11	FW	(Russia) RUS	Pavel Ignatovich	7	0	3+4	0	0+0	0	0+0	0
13	DF	(Russia) RUS	Vladimir Granat	30	1	25+0	1	3+0	0	1+1	0
14	MF	(Russia) RUS	Artur Yusupov	29	3	23+2	2	1+0	0	3+0	1
15	DF	(Moldova) MDA	Alexandru Epureanu	7	0	5+2	0	0+0	0	0+0	0
16	MF	(Ecuador) ECU	Christian Noboa	31	5	21+6	5	2+0	0	2+0	0
17	MF	(Russia) RUS	Alan Gatagov	4	1	0+3	1	1+0	0	0+0	0
18	GK	(Armenia) ARM	Roman Berezovsky	9	0	7+0	0	1+0	0	1+0	0
19	GK	(Russia) RUS	Yevgeni Frolov	0	0	0+0	0	0+0	0	0+0	0
21	FW	(Austria) AUT	Jakob Jantscher	23	1	14+6	1	3+0	0	0+0	0
22	FW	(Germany) GER	Kevin Kurányi	34	11	24+3	10	3+0	1	4+0	0
23	DF	(Australia) AUS	Luke Wilkshire	21	0	17+0	0	1+0	0	3+0	0
25	DF	(Russia) RUS	Denis Kolodin	3	0	0+2	0	1+0	0	0+0	0
28	MF	(Netherlands) NED	Otman Bakkal	5	0	0+4	0	0+0	0	0+1	0
32	DF	(Serbia) SRB	Marko Lomić	32	0	26+0	0	2+0	0	4+0	0
33	DF	(Russia) RUS	Vladimir Rykov	10	2	7+0	0	1+0	2	2+0	0
41	MF	(Russia) RUS	Aleksandr Sapeta	25	2	13+7	0	1+1	0	1+2	2
44	DF	(Russia) RUS	Nikita Chicherin	18	0	12+3	0	2+0	0	1+0	0
78	FW	(Russia) RUS	Pavel Solomatin	9	1	3+6	1	0+0	0	0+0	0
90	MF	(Russia) RUS	Ivan Solovyov	14	1	8+4	1	0+2	0	0+0	0
Players away from Dynamo on loan:
2	DF	(Russia) RUS	Vladimir Kisenkov	0	0	0+0	0	0+0	0	0+0	0
3	DF	(Croatia) CRO	Gordon Schildenfeld	10	0	5+1	0	0+0	0	3+1	0
4	DF	(Belarus) BLR	Igor Shitov	1	0	0+1	0	0+0	0	0+0	0
11	FW	(Ukraine) UKR	Andriy Voronin	0	0	0+0	0	0+0	0	0+0	0
27	FW	(Russia) RUS	Fyodor Smolov	0	0	0+0	0	0+0	0	0+0	0
93	FW	(Russia) RUS	Andrei Panyukov	5	1	0+3	0	0+1	1	0+1	0
Players who appeared for Dynamo no longer at the club:
8	MF	(Bosnia and Herzegovina) BIH	Zvjezdan Misimović	14	0	5+4	0	0+1	0	3+1	0
12	MF	(Belarus) BLR	Pavel Nyakhaychyk	9	0	0+6	0	1+0	0	1+1	0
20	MF	(Romania) ROU	Adrian Ropotan	8	0	2+4	0	2+0	0	0+0	0

=== Scorers and Assistants ===
As of 27 May 2013

Place	Position	Nation	Number	Name	League goals	League assists	Cup goals	Cup assists	Europa League goals	Europa League assists	Total
1	FW	(Russia)	9	Aleksandr Kokorin	10	4	0	0	3	2	19
2	MF	(Hungary)	7	Balázs Dzsudzsák	5	9	0	0	0	2	16
3	FW	(Germany)	22	Kevin Kurányi	10	2	1	0	0	0	13
4	FW	(Austria)	21	Jakob Jantscher	1	5	0	2	0	0	8
5	FW	(Ecuador)	16	Christian Noboa	5	2	0	0	0	0	7
6	MF	(Russia)	90	Ivan Solovyov	1	3	0	1	0	0	5
7	MF	(Russia)	10	Igor Semshov	2	0	0	0	2	0	4
8	DF	(Serbia)	32	Marko Lomić	0	2	0	0	0	2	4
9	MF	(Russia)	14	Artur Yusupov	2	0	0	0	1	0	3
10	MF	(Russia)	41	Aleksandr Sapeta	0	1	0	0	2	0	3
11	DF	(Russia)	33	Vladimir Rykov	0	0	2	0	0	0	2
12	DF	(Argentina)	6	Leandro Fernández	0	1	0	1	0	0	2
12	MF	(Russia)	17	Alan Gatagov	1	1	0	0	0	0	2
12	FW	(Russia)	11	Pavel Ignatovich	0	2	0	0	0	0	2
15	DF	(Russia)	13	Vladimir Granat	1	0	0	0	0	0	1
15	FW	(Russia)	78	Pavel Solomatin	1	0	0	0	0	0	1
				TOTALS	39	32	3	3	8	6	91

=== Disciplinary record ===
As of 27 May 2013

Number	Nation	Position	Name	Russian Premier League		Russian Cup		Europa League		Total	
Number	Nation	Position	Name	Yellow card	Red card	Yellow card	Red card	Yellow card	Red card	Yellow card	Red card
1	(Russia)	GK	Anton Shunin	2	0	0	0	0	0	2	0
3	(Croatia)	DF	Gordon Schildenfeld	1	1	0	0	1	0	2	1
6	(Argentina)	DF	Leandro Fernández	3	0	0	0	1	0	4	0
7	(Hungary)	MF	Balázs Dzsudzsák	4	1	1	0	0	0	5	1
8	(Bosnia and Herzegovina)	MF	Zvjezdan Misimović	3	0	0	0	0	0	3	0
9	(Russia)	FW	Aleksandr Kokorin	3	1	0	0	1	0	4	1
10	(Russia)	MF	Igor Semshov	1	0	1	0	0	0	2	0
13	(Russia)	DF	Vladimir Granat	4	0	1	0	1	0	6	0
14	(Russia)	MF	Artur Yusupov	8	1	1	0	3	0	12	1
15	(Moldova)	DF	Alexandru Epureanu	2	0	0	0	0	0	2	0
16	(Ecuador)	MF	Christian Noboa	2	1	0	0	0	0	2	1
20	(Romania)	MF	Adrian Ropotan	2	0	1	0	0	0	3	0
21	(Austria)	FW	Jakob Jantscher	1	0	0	0	0	0	1	0
22	(Germany)	FW	Kevin Kurányi	5	1	1	0	0	0	6	1
23	(Australia)	DF	Luke Wilkshire	8	0	1	0	0	0	9	0
32	(Serbia)	DF	Marko Lomić	4	0	0	0	0	0	4	0
33	(Russia)	DF	Vladimir Rykov	1	1	1	0	1	0	3	1
41	(Russia)	MF	Aleksandr Sapeta	3	0	0	0	1	0	4	0
44	(Russia)	DF	Nikita Chicherin	2	0	0	0	1	0	3	0
78	(Russia)	FW	Pavel Solomatin	2	0	0	0	0	0	2	0
90	(Russia)	MF	Ivan Solovyov	0	0	1	0	0	0	1	0
			TOTALS	59	7	9	0	10	0	78	7

== Transfers ==
=== In ===
Note: Flags indicate national team as defined under FIFA eligibility rules; some limited exceptions apply. Players may hold more than one non-FIFA nationality.

No.	Pos.	Nation	Player
3	DF	CRO	Gordon Schildenfeld (from (Germany) Eintracht Frankfurt)
17	MF	RUS	Alan Gatagov (end of loan to (Russia) Tom Tomsk)
20	MF	ROU	Adrian Ropotan (end of loan to (Russia) Tom Tomsk)
25	DF	RUS	Denis Kolodin (end of loan to (Russia) Rostov)
28	MF	NED	Otman Bakkal (from (Netherlands) PSV Eindhoven, previously on loan to (Netherlands) Feyenoord)
44	DF	RUS	Nikita Chicherin (end of loan to (Russia) Volga Nizhny Novgorod)

=== Out ===
Note: Flags indicate national team as defined under FIFA eligibility rules; some limited exceptions apply. Players may hold more than one non-FIFA nationality.

No.	Pos.	Nation	Player
2	DF	RUS	Vladimir Kisenkov (on loan to (Russia) Rostov)
5	DF	MDA	Alexandru Epureanu (on loan to (Russia) Krylia Sovetov Samara)
11	FW	UKR	Andriy Voronin (on loan to (Germany) Fortuna Düsseldorf)
19	MF	RUS	Aleksandr Samedov (to (Russia) Lokomotiv Moscow)
27	FW	RUS	Fyodor Smolov (on loan to (Russia) Anzhi Makhachkala)
45	MF	UKR	Borys Tashchy (on loan to (Ukraine) Chornomorets Odesa)
56	MF	RUS	Vladimir Sobolev (to (Russia) Khimki)
77	FW	RUS	Irakli Logua (to (Russia) Sibir Novosibirsk)
—	DF	FIN	Boris Rotenberg (on loan to (Cyprus) Olympiakos Nicosia, previously on loan to (Russia) Kuban Krasnodar)
—	MF	CRO	Tomislav Dujmović (on loan to (Russia) Mordovia Saransk, previously on loan to (Spain) Real Zaragoza)
—	MF	RUS	Yuri Kirillov (to (Russia) Ufa, previously on loan to (Russia) Ural Sverdlovsk Oblast)

=== Out on loan ===
Note: Flags indicate national team as defined under FIFA eligibility rules; some limited exceptions apply. Players may hold more than one non-FIFA nationality.

No.	Pos.	Nation	Player
2	DF	RUS	Vladimir Kisenkov (to FC Rostov)
3	DF	RUS	Boris Rotenberg (to Olympiakos Nicosia)
5	DF	MDA	Alexandru Epureanu (to Krylia Sovetov Samara, returned Jan 2013)

No.	Pos.	Nation	Player
18	MF	CRO	Tomislav Dujmovic (to Mordovia Saransk)
—	MF	UKR	Borys Tashchy (to Chornomorets Odesa)
—	FW	RUS	Fyodor Smolov (to Anzhi Makhachkala)

== Youth squad ==
The following players are registered with the RFPL and are listed by club's website as youth players. They are eligible to play for the first team.

Note: Flags indicate national team as defined under FIFA eligibility rules; some limited exceptions apply. Players may hold more than one non-FIFA nationality.

No.	Pos.	Nation	Player
17	MF	RUS	Alan Gatagov
30	GK	RUS	Yegor Generalov
34	MF	RUS	Artyom Katashevsky
35	GK	RUS	Roman Khalanchuk (left Jan 2013)
37	MF	RUS	Sergei Terekhov (left Jan 2013 to Volgar)
42	MF	RUS	Yuri Kirillov
45	DF	RUS	Artyom Yarmolitsky
47	MF	RUS	Roman Zobnin
49	DF	RUS	Grigori Morozov
55	DF	RUS	Nikita Sergeyev
57	DF	RUS	Vladimir Rykhovskiy (left Sep 2012 for Dnepr Smolensk)
58	FW	RUS	Dmitri Otstavnov
59	MF	RUS	Aleksandr Ilyin
61	DF	RUS	Pavel Yevseyev
68	DF	RUS	Antonio Moreyes
70	MF	RUS	Roman Yeremeyev
71	MF	RUS	Igor Gorbunov
73	DF	RUS	Vladimir Dmitriev
74	MF	RUS	Anatoli Katrich

No.	Pos.	Nation	Player
76	DF	RUS	Anton Ivanov
77	MF	RUS	Igor Khokhlov
78	FW	RUS	Pavel Solomatin
79	MF	RUS	Karen Akopyan (left Aug 2012)
79	MF	RUS	Aleksandr Morgunov
80	MF	RUS	Vladimir Torshentsev (left Feb 2013 to Volga)
81	DF	RUS	Yegor Danilkin
82	DF	RUS	Anton Alayev
86	MF	RUS	Vladislav Lyovin
87	MF	RUS	Valeri Saramutin
88	MF	RUS	Aleksandr Tashayev
89	GK	RUS	Igor Leshchuk
93	FW	RUS	Andrei Panyukov (left Feb 2013 to Khimki on loan)
94	MF	RUS	Dmitri Zhivoglyadov
95	MF	RUS	Dmitri Starodub
97	MF	RUS	Vitali Komisov
98	MF	RUS	Dmitri Vlasov
99	MF	RUS	Mikhail Zhabkin
