= Luke Wilkshire =

Australian soccer player (born 1981)

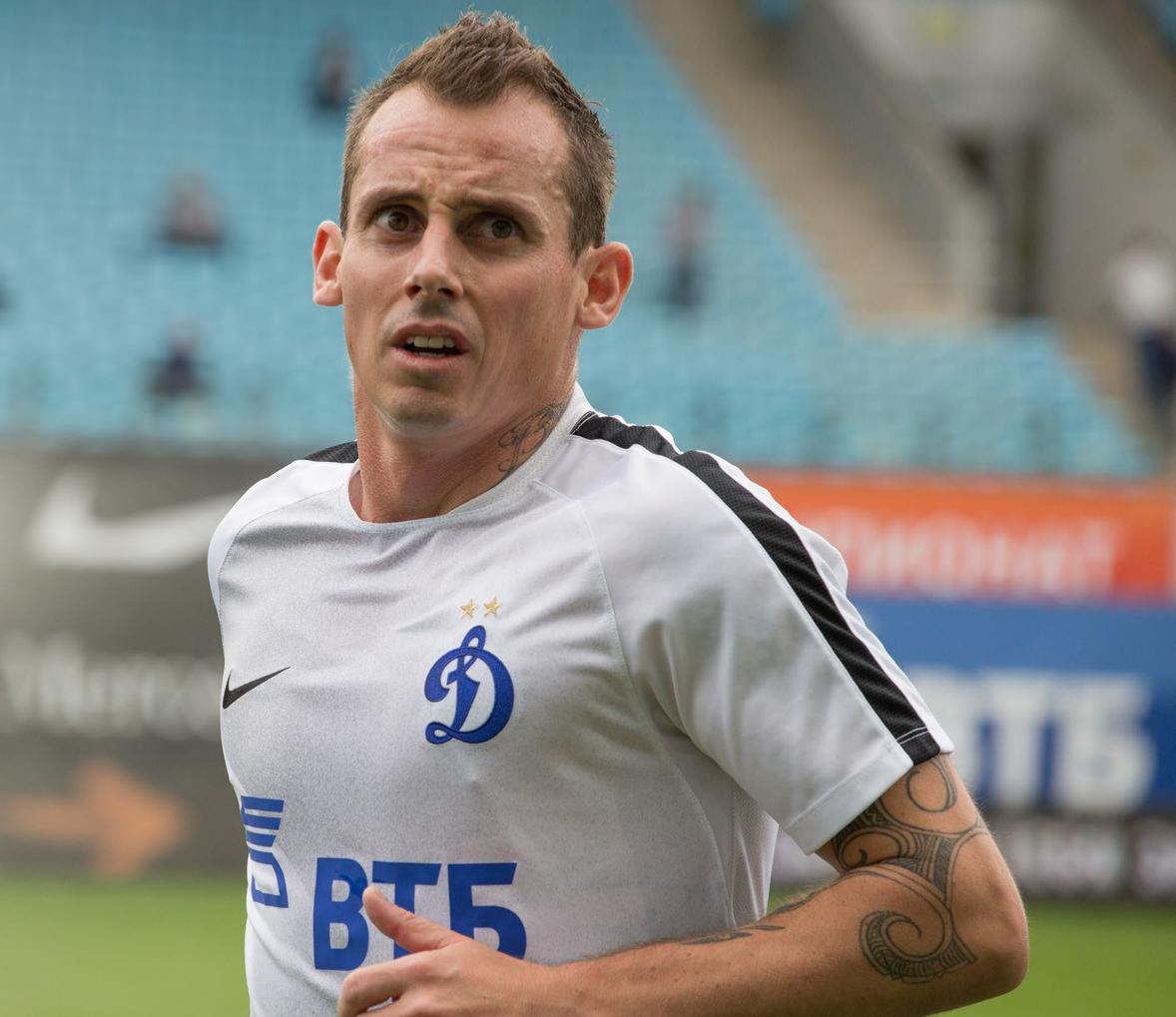
- Wilkshire playing for Dynamo Moscow in 2016

Personal information
- Full name: Luke Wilkshire
- Date of birth: 2 October 1981 (age 45)
- Place of birth: Wollongong, Australia
- Height: 1.76 m (5 ft 9 in)
- Position: Right-back

Youth career
- 1992–1995: Albion Park JSC
- 1995–1997: Wollongong Wolves
- 1997–1998: AIS
- 1998–2000: Middlesbrough

Senior career*
Years	Team	Apps	(Gls)
2000–2003	Middlesbrough	22	(0)
2003–2006	Bristol City	112	(17)
2006–2008	Twente	59	(5)
2008–2014	Dynamo Moscow	143	(2)
2014–2015	Feyenoord	18	(0)
2016	Terek Grozny	6	(0)
2016–2017	Dynamo Moscow	6	(0)
2017–2018	Sydney FC	25	(1)
2018	Wollongong Wolves	11	(1)
Total		403	(26)

International career
2001	Australia U-20	12	(3)
2003–2004	Australia U-23	17	(4)
2004–2014	Australia	80	(8)

Managerial career
- 2018–2022: Wollongong Wolves
- 2022–2023: CCM Academy
- 2025–: Wollongong Wolves
Medal record
Men's football
Representing Australia
AFC Asian Cup
Runner-up	2011 Qatar
OFC Nations Cup
Winner	2004 Australia
OFC U-20 Championship
Winner	Cook Islands/New Caledonia 2001
- * Club domestic league appearances and goals

Luke Wilkshire (born 2 October 1981) is an Australian soccer coach and a former player who is currently head coach of Australian Championship side Wollongong Wolves.

Born in Wollongong, Wilkshire played youth football for Albion Park, Wollongong Wolves, and the Australian Institute of Sport before making his professional debut for English club Middlesbrough. In 2003, he moved to Bristol City, where he spent three seasons before moving to the Netherlands to play for Twente in 2006. Wilkshire next played in Russia for Dynamo Moscow, but later moved back to the Netherlands to play for Feyenoord in 2014. He was released from the club in August 2015 by mutual consent.

Wilkshire has played eighty times for the Australian national team. This includes matches at both the 2006 and 2010 FIFA World Cups, as well as the 2007 and 2011 AFC Asian Cups. He was also a member of the squad at the 2005 FIFA Confederations Cup. Previously, with Australia's youth sides, Wilkshire took part in the 2001 FIFA U-20 World Cup and the 2004 Summer Olympics.

== Club career ==
=== Middlesbrough ===
Wilkshire played his junior football with his home town club of Albion Park and attended Albion Park High School. He moved on to represent his region by joining the Wollongong Wolves youth setup and spending several seasons there. Wilkshire then travelled to Canberra to spend a year at the AIS football program, Australia's elite sports academy. He then moved overseas and was part of Middlesbrough's youth system.

After progressing through the first team, Wilkshire made his Middlesbrough debut on 6 March 2002, where he played the whole game, in a 1–1 draw against Southampton. After making eight appearances in all competitions in the 2001–02 season, he signed a contract extension with the club, keeping him until 2004.

He went on to make further senior appearances for them in the Premier League, including a sending off against Arsenal, and also started in an FA Cup semi-final., but ultimately never established himself in the first team.

=== Bristol City ===
In search of regular football, Wilkshire decided on a move to Second Division club Bristol City for an undisclosed fee. The transfer fee was revealed as £220K.

Wilkshire made his Bristol City debut, making his first start and playing 90 minutes, in a 5–0 win over Notts County in the opening game of the season. Since making his debut, he established himself in the first team and it wasn't until on 7 November 2003 when he scored his first Bristol City goal, in the first round of the FA Cup, in a 5–2 win over Bradford Park Avenue and scored again eight days later on 15 November 2003, in a 4–1 win over Brighton & Hove Albion. His second goal later came on 21 February 2004, scoring the only goal in the game, in a 1–0 win over Wrexham. Wilkshire finished his first season at the club, making forty-five appearances and scoring two times in all competitions.

The 2004–05 season saw Wilkshire missing out the start of the season, due to international commitment. After this, Wilkshire returned to the first team and then scored twice, in a 4–1 win over Brentford on 30 August 2004. By the end of 2004, he scored six more goals, which came against Huddersfield Town, Hull City, MK Dons, Tranmere Rovers (twice) and Blackpool. However, during the season, Wilkshire was a subject to diving during a match against Blackpool after he dived in the penalty spot from a challenge to win a penalty, a claim that was denied by Wilkshire, himself. Later in the 2004–05 season, Wilkshire went on to score two more goals against Oldham Athletic and Sheffield Wednesday and went to finish the season, scoring ten times in forty-one appearances in all competitions.

However, the 2005–06 season saw Wilkshire sent-off after a second bookable offence, in a 1–0 loss against Huddersfield Town on 9 August 2005. After the match, Manager Brian Tinnion expressed shock over Wilkshire's sending off and served a one match ban. Despite this, Wilkshire returned to the first team soon after and scored his first goal of the season, in a 3–2 win over Brentford on 24 September 2005. By the end of 2005, he scored two more goals against Tranmere Rovers and Chesterfield. After coming on as substitute in the second half against Walsall on 2 January 2006, he scored his third goal of the season, in a 3–0 win. His fifth goal of the season later came on 18 March 2006, in a 6–0 win over Gillingham. Wilkshire finished the 2005–06 season, making thirty-eight appearances and scoring five times in all competitions.

At the end of the 2005–06 season, Wilkshire left the club after not returning to the club for pre-season training. He previously wished to leave the club in hopes of being called up for the World Cup squad in Germany.

=== FC Twente ===
His solid performances at the 2006 FIFA World Cup earned him a trial and subsequent three-year deal with Dutch top flight club FC Twente despite reported interest from other Dutch clubs, including Ajax and PSV Eindhoven.

His league debut for FC Twente ended badly when he was sent off in the first half, in a 3–0 loss against Heracles Almelo. After serving a two match suspension, Wilkshire made his return to the first team from injury, where he assisted one of the goals, in a 2–2 draw against AZ on 17 September 2006. It wasn't until on 12 November 2006 when Wilkshire scored his first Twente goal, in a 7–1 win over Groningen. The following month, on 27 December 2006, he scored his second goal of the season, in a 3–0 win over AZ Alkmaar. After suffering from a knee injury against ADO Den Haag on 28 January 2007, which saw him out for weeks, he made his return to the first team, coming on as a substitute in the second half, in a 0–0 draw against Willem II on 24 February 2007. He continued to feature in the first team for the remainder of the season and finished his first season, making thirty appearances and scoring two times in all competitions. Nevertheless, Wilkshire would go on to play regularly in the 2006–07 campaign which saw FC Twente qualify for the UEFA Cup.

In the 2007–08 season, Wilkshire started well in the opening game of the season against Excelsior when he set up one of the goals, in a 2–0 win. Despite coming off in the five minutes to the game against Willem II on 16 September 2007, He then scored his first goal of the season, as well as, setting up one of the goals, in a 3–0 win over NEC on 23 September 2007. After setting three goals in two matches, including assisting twice against Feyenoord on 27 October 2007, Wilkshire scored his second goal of the season, in a 1–1 draw against NAC Breda on 10 November 2007. His third goal of the season later came on 23 March 2008, in a 2–1 win over Ajax. Despite being left out of the squad, either due to suspension and once left out of squad after he was late, due to an international commitment, he finished his second season at the club, making thirty-six appearances and scoring three times in all competitions. Subsequently, in the 2007–08 campaign, FC Twente and Wilkshire accomplished an even bigger achievement: for the first time in the club history, FC Twente qualified for the preliminary round of the Champions League.

For his performance, Wilkshire signed a contract with the club, keeping him until 2012. He then made his only appearance for the club in the 2008–09 season, in the UEFA Champions League, in a 2–0 loss against Arsenal.

=== Dynamo Moscow ===
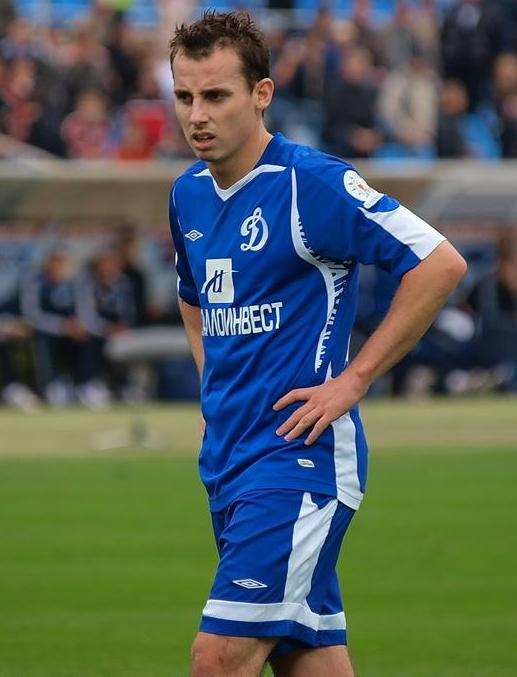
Luke Wilkshire in action with FC Dynamo Moscow in 2008.

On 26 August 2008, Wilkshire moved to Russian side Dynamo Moscow for a reported €6 million transfer fee; while other sources suggested transfer fee was only €2 million.

He made his Russian Premier League debut for Dynamo Moscow on 31 August 2008, playing the full 90 minutes against FC Moscow at the Dynamo Stadium in Moscow. He scored his first goal for Dynamo from a penalty on 27 September 2008, playing against Krylya Sovetov in Samara, Russia. Wilkshire then scored his second goal of the season, in a 3–1 loss against CSKA Moscow on 27 October 2008. Wilkshire became a first team regular at the club and finished his first full season, making eleven appearances and scoring two times in all competitions.

In the 2009 season, Wilkshire continued to be the first team regular and played out in different positions. Wilkshire set up a goal for Aleksandr Kerzhakov to score a winning goal, in a 2–1 win over Spartak Nalchik and two weeks later, on 2 August 2009, he again set up a goal for Kerzhakov, in a 2–1 win over Khimki. However, he received a red card after a second bookable offence, in a 3–0 loss against Rubin Kazan on 23 August 2009. Despite this, Wilkshire continued to be in the first team regular following his sending off and went on to finish the season, making thirty-two appearances in all competitions. At the end of the 2009 season, Wilkshire signed a contract extension with the club, keeping him until 2012.

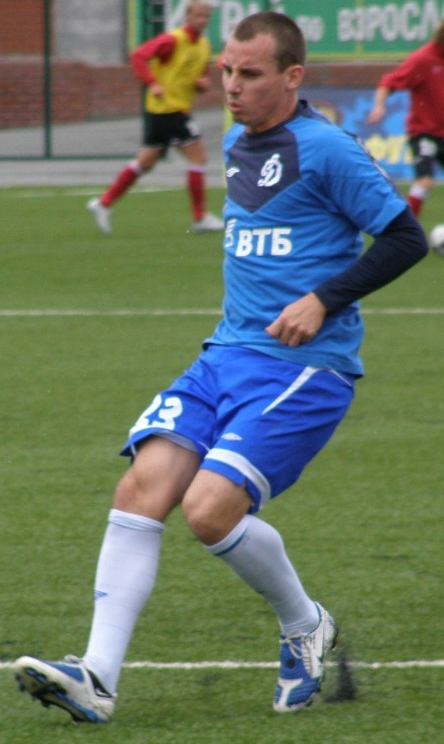
Wilkshire warming for the club ahead of the match in 2009.

In the 2010 season, Wilkshire remained in the first team regular and after suffering from an injury, which he sustained during a match against Serbia in the World Cup, he returned to the first team from injury on 17 July 2010, where he set up one of the goals, which was the first goal, in a 3–2 win over Rostov. As the 2010 season progressed, Wilkshire received a red card after a second bookable offence, in a 1–1 draw against Krylya Sovetov on 20 November 2010, which turns out to be his last appearance of the season. Despite receiving a suspension twice during the season, he finished the season, making thirty-one appearances in all competitions.

In the 2011–12 season, Wilkshire began to play in the right-back position and his performance against Kuban Krasnodar, which saw them win 1–0 on 9 April 2011, earned him Team of the Week. His performance attracted interests from league's rivals and bigger spender Anzhi Makhachkala in the summer transfer window, but the move never happened. Despite this, Wilkshire, subsequently, signed a contract extension with the club, keeping him until 2014. At the 2011–12 season, Wilkshire finished the season, making forty-three appearances in all competitions despite receiving suspensions and missed the rest of the season, due to an injury, which cost him a place for the Russian Cup Final against Rubin Kazan, which saw them lose 1–0. During the final, Wilkshire was involved in an incident with Rubin Kazan players when things got physical.

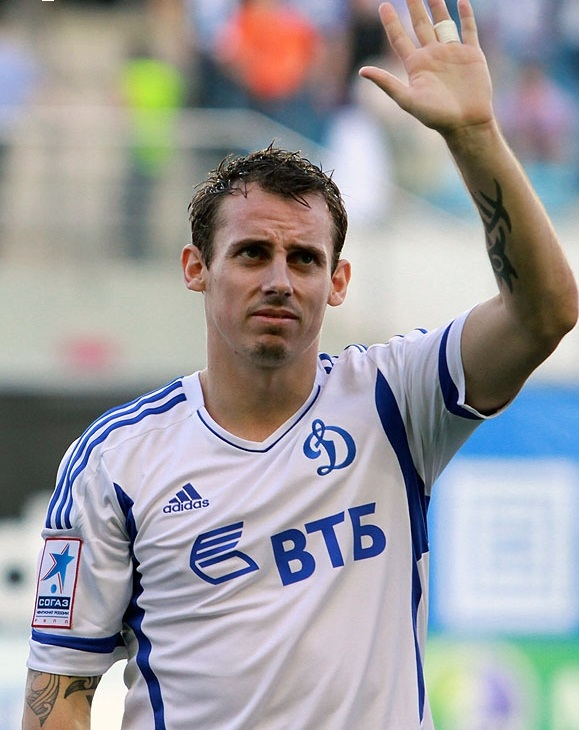
Wilkshire waving to the Dynamo Moscow supporters following the match.

In the 2012–13 season, Wilkshire continued to be in the first team regular at the start of the season before suffering an injury during a match against Alania Vladikavkaz on 10 November 2012. During the season and even after his absence, Wilkshire found himself competing over a right-back position with Nikita Chicherin. After being on the sidelines and eventually appearing on the substitute bench in a number of matches, he played his first match since November on 12 April 2013, which saw Dynamo Moscow draw 0–0 against CSKA Moscow. After regaining his first team place, Wilkshire finished the season, making twenty-appearances in all competitions.

In the 2013–14 season, Wilkshire played the first three matches to the start of the season before appearing on the substitute bench for two matches between 3 August 2013 and 18 August 2013. Despite this, Wilkshire continued to be in the first regular and though he was suspended twice, Wilkshire played his last game for the club in the last game of the season when he set up one of the goals, in a 3–2 loss against Spartak Moscow on 15 May 2014. Wilkshire went on to finish the season, making twenty-four appearances in all competitions.

At the end of the 2013–14 season, Wilkshire was released by the club following the expiration to his contract, ending his six years association with the club. Wilkshire previously hinted that it would be his last match for the club.

=== Feyenoord ===
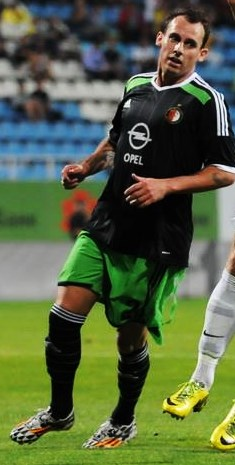
Luke Wilkshire in action with Feyenoord in 2014.

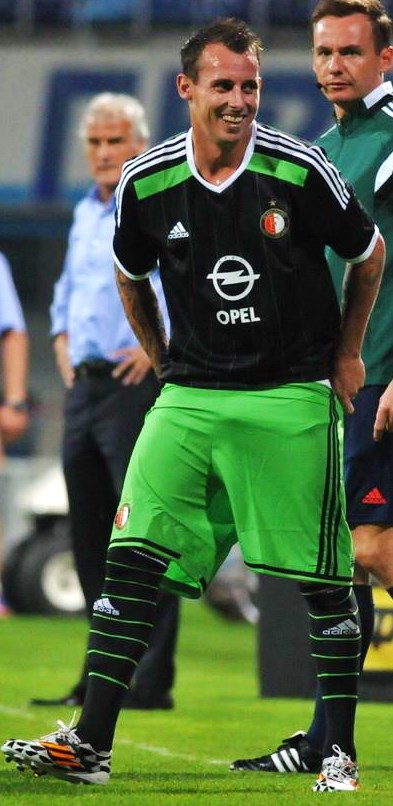
Luke Wilkshire in action with Feyenoord in 2014.

On 31 July 2014, Wilkshire signed a one-year deal with Dutch Eredivisie side Feyenoord on a free transfer. The move saw him reunite with Manager Fred Rutten, who signed him at Twente.

Wilkshire made his Feyenoord debut, playing as a right-back position and played the whole game, in a 1–0 win over ADO Den Haag in the opening game of the season. Wilkshire then played a role when he set up a goal three times this season, including one with a 1–0 win over NAC Breda on 21 December 2014. Despite competing with Khalid Boulahrouz over the right-back position, his time at Feyenoord, however, was overshadowed with injuries. His last appearance came on 19 February 2015 in a UEFA Europa League match against Roma, where he played for 30 minutes before suffering a hamstring injury, resulting him being substituted, in a 1–1 draw. Although he didn't play again for the rest of the season, following his return from injury As a result, injuries restricted him to making twenty-seven appearances (16 league appearances) in all competitions.

Despite waiting on whether or not he would sign a contract with the club for another season, he left Feyenoord by mutual consent. on 13 August 2015. After being released by Feyenoord, Wilkshire explained his release, citing new challenges.

=== Terek Grozny ===
On 18 November 2015, Wilkshire signed a one-year contract, with the option of an additional year, with Russian club Terek Gronzny, beginning on 1 January 2016. It wasn't until January when Wilkshire was officially presented as a Terek Grozny player.

Wilkshire made his Terek Grozny debut on 6 March 2016, playing as a right back and playing the whole game, in a 2–1 win over Lokomotiv Moscow and for his performance, he was named Team of the Week. In his sixth appearance for the club, however, Wilkshire received a red card after a second bookable offence, in a 1–0 loss against CSKA Moscow on 7 May 2016. This turns out to be his last appearance for the club and made seven appearances in all competitions.

On 30 August 2016, he was released from his Terek contract by mutual consent. Over the summer, Wilkshire signed a contract with the club.

=== Dynamo Moscow (second spell) ===
On 31 August 2016, he returned to Dynamo Moscow in his second spell, signing a contract until the end of the season. Upon joining the club for the second time, Wilkshire expressed delight on returning to the club.

Wilkshire made his Dynamo Moscow debut for the second time However, in a match against Mordovia Saransk on 2 October 2016, Wilkshire received a red card after a second bookable offence in the first half, in a 1–0 win.

On 12 May 2017, Dynamo announced that the club and Wilkshire decided not to extend his contract as it ran out at the end of the season. The game against FC Shinnik Yaroslavl on 14 May 2017 was an official farewell game for Wilkshire at Dynamo.

=== Sydney FC ===
In July, 2017 Wilkshire returned to Australian club football, signing a one-year contract with Sydney FC as an injury replacement player for Rhyan Grant. Wilkshire scored his first goal for the Sky Blues in a 1–0 win over Melbourne City in the Round 5 of the A-League season, lofting the ball over the keeper on the volley from a Michael Zullo cross.

Wilkshire scored the club's first goal in the 2018 AFC Champions League, blasting home a parried shot away to Shanghai Shenhua at Hongkou Football Stadium.

On 9 May 2018, Wilkshire left Sydney FC to pursue other opportunities.

=== Wollongong Wolves ===
On 11 May 2018, Wollongong Wolves announced they signed Wilkshire for the rest of the 2018 NPL NSW season.

At the end of the 2018 National Premier Leagues season, Wilkshire retired from playing football and took up a position as Wolves' head coach.

== International career ==
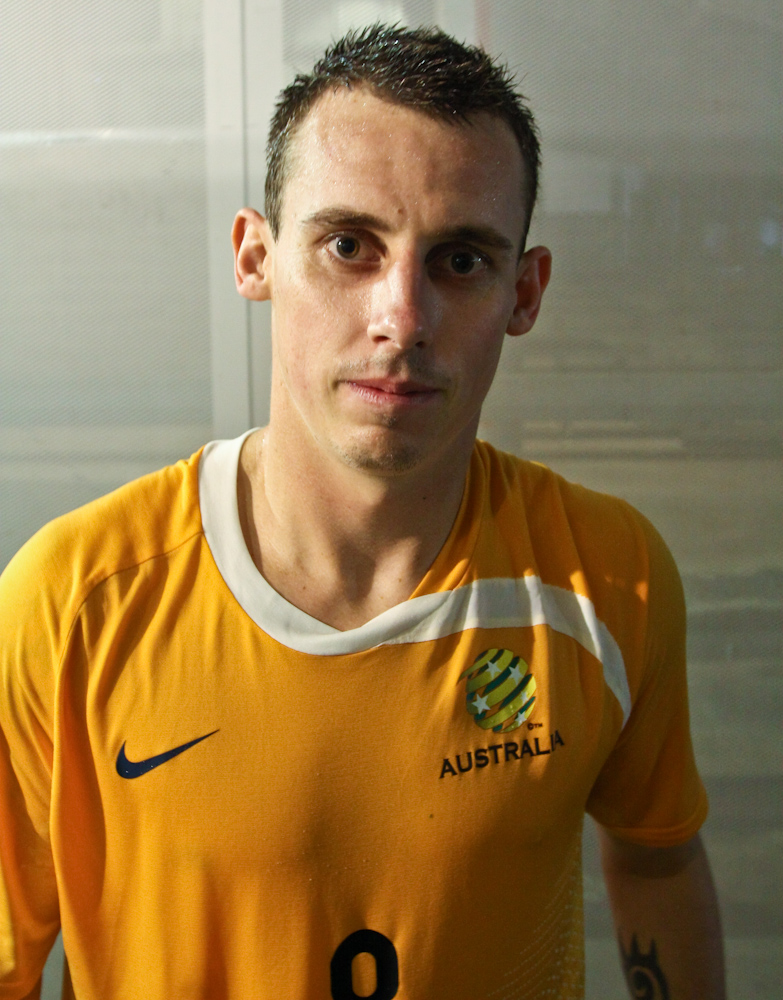
Luke Wilkshire with Australia in 2009.

Wilkshire has represented Australia at youth level earlier in his career, playing in the 2001 FIFA U-20 World Cup in Argentina, and in the 2004 Athens Olympic Games, where he once captained the side against Iraq.

After this, Wilkshire was called up by the national team for the first time and made his debut, in a 5–1 win over Solomon Islands in the first leg of the OFC Nations Cup Final and played again in the second leg, which saw them win the tournament after beating them 6–0.

During three years of playing regular first-team football for Bristol City, Wilkshire's game and versatility improved; so much so that former Australia coach, Guus Hiddink, described him as a "modern player." Hiddink also claimed Wilkshire was one of the most technically gifted players in the Socceroo side. Wilkshire was selected in Australia's squad for the 2006 FIFA World Cup and started against Japan and Italy.

On 14 November 2009, Wilkshire scored his first goal for his country in a 2–1 win over Oman in an Asian Cup Qualifier, in Muscat, Oman. Despite Australia going down to 10-men and conceding a penalty to go down 1–0, Wilkshire scored the equaliser in the 43rd minute. He was then involved in the second goal in the 82nd minute putting a left-footed ball over the Omani defence to set David Carney free who then crossed to Brett Emerton who scored to win the game 2–1 for Australia.

In the 2010 FIFA World Cup, Wilkshire started in all three group games for Australia. Playing at right back, Wilkshire was vital in coming forward sending in a total of 18 crosses for the tournament. Late in Australia's last game versus Serbia, Wilkshire injured his groin and was subbed off – the severity of the injury has not been made public.

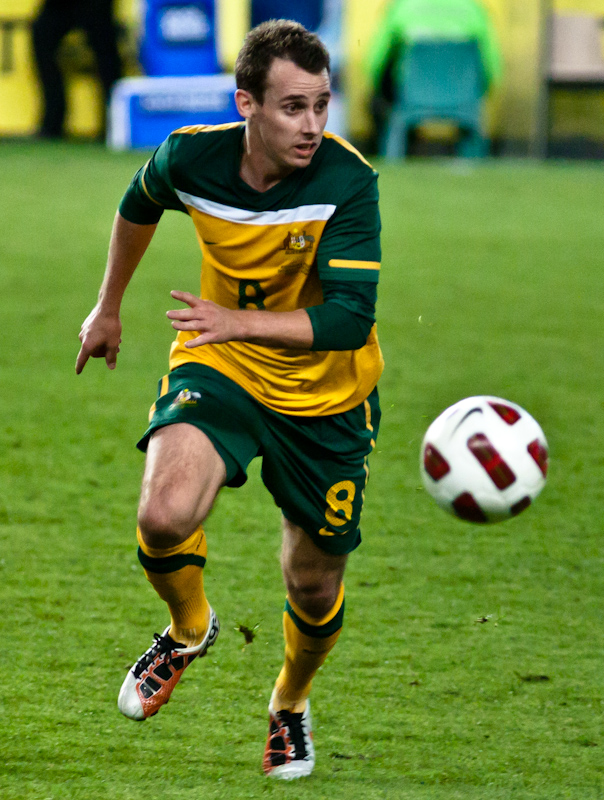
Wilkshire playing for the national team against Paraguay at the Sydney Football Stadium.

Wilkshire played in the 2011 Asian Cup Finals in Qatar, starting the first two games against India and South Korea respectively but missing Australia's final group-stage game against Bahrain due to injury. Wilkshire returned to play the full 120 minutes in Australia's extra-time quarter-final win over Iraq and he also played in the semi-final victory over Uzbekistan, and in the final against Japan, which Australia lost 1–0 in extra time.

Wilkshire has not been selected for the Socceroos since the appointment of Ange Postecoglou as head coach in October 2013, apart from two early friendlies against Ecuador in which he did not play and South Africa in which he played 36 minutes. He was not named in the Australian squad for the 2014 FIFA World Cup, and was left off the longlist of 46 players for the 2015 AFC Asian Cup, despite him maintaining his regular first team place at Feyenoord.

== Coaching career ==
Wilkshire served as an assistant coach with the Australia U-20 team in 2023, and served as an assistant coach with Australia from 2023 to 2024.

== Personal life ==
Wilkshire was married to Quyeny (who is from Vietnam) and together, they have one child.

Wilkshire considers Russia as his second home. He has two other children, Paige and Toby, with Sally Ashton. Toby is signed up to play for Wollongong when he turns 16, and is a season ticket holder at Middlesbrough FC.

As of 2016, Wilkshire is married to Russian Christina and lives in Khimki, Moscow Oblast with her and their two children. Wilkshire is a convert to Russian Orthodox Christianity.

== Career statistics ==
=== Club ===
Appearances and goals by club, season and competition
Club	Season	League			Cup		Continental		Total	
Club	Season	Division	Apps	Goals	Apps	Goals	Apps	Goals	Apps	Goals
Middlesbrough	2001–02	Premier League	7	0	1	0	0	0	8	0
Middlesbrough	2002–03	Premier League	14	0	2	0	0	0	16	0
Middlesbrough	2003–04	Premier League	1	0	0	0	0	0	1	0
Middlesbrough	Total		22	0	3	0	0	0	25	0
Bristol City	2003–04	League One	39	2	6	1	0	0	45	3
Bristol City	2004–05	League One	37	10	4	0	0	0	41	10
Bristol City	2005–06	League One	36	5	2	0	0	0	38	5
Bristol City	Total		112	17	12	1	0	0	124	18
FC Twente	2006–07	Eredivisie	29	2	1	0	2	0	32	2
FC Twente	2007–08	Eredivisie	30	3	4	0	2	0	36	3
FC Twente	Total		59	5	5	0	4	0	68	5
Dynamo Moscow	2008	Russian Premier League	11	2	3	0	0	0	14	2
Dynamo Moscow	2009	Russian Premier League	27	0	1	0	4	0	32	0
Dynamo Moscow	2010	Russian Premier League	26	0	3	0	0	0	29	0
Dynamo Moscow	2011–12	Russian Premier League	39	0	4	0	0	0	43	0
Dynamo Moscow	2012–13	Russian Premier League	17	0	1	0	3	0	21	0
Dynamo Moscow	2013–14	Russian Premier League	23	0	1	0	0	0	24	0
Dynamo Moscow	Total		143	2	13	0	7	0	163	2
Feyenoord	2014–15	Eredivisie	18	0	1	0	8	0	27	0
Terek Grozny	2015–16	Russian Premier League	6	0	0	0	0	0	6	0
Dynamo Moscow	2016–17	Russian National League	6	0	1	0	0	0	7	0
Sydney FC	2017–18	A-League	25	1	3	0	5	1	33	2
Wollongong Wolves	2018	NPL NSW	11	1	0	0	0	0	11	1
Career total			403	26	38	1	24	1	465	28

=== International ===
Appearances and goals by national team and year
National team	Year	Apps	Goals
Australia	2004	2	0
Australia	2005	4	0
Australia	2006	7	0
Australia	2007	8	0
Australia	2008	10	0
Australia	2009	7	1
Australia	2010	12	2
Australia	2011	16	3
Australia	2012	7	1
Australia	2013	6	1
Australia	2014	1	0
Total		80	8

Scores and results list Australia's goal tally first.

No.	Date	Venue	Opponent	Score	Result	Competition
1.	14 November 2009	Sultan Qaboos Sports Complex, Muscat, Oman	Oman	1–1	2–1	2011 AFC Asian Cup qualification
2.	6 January 2010	Jaber Al-Ahmad International Stadium, Kuwait City, Kuwait	Kuwait	1–0	2–2	2011 AFC Asian Cup qualification
3.	7 September 2010	Stadion Miejski, Kraków, Poland	Poland	2–1	2–1	Friendly
4.	29 March 2011	Borussia-Park, Mönchengladbach, Germany	Germany	2–1	2–1	Friendly
5.	6 September 2011	Prince Mohamed bin Fahd Stadium, Dammam, Saudi Arabia	Saudi Arabia	3–1	3–1	2014 FIFA World Cup qualification
6.	7 October 2011	Canberra Stadium, Canberra, Australia	Malaysia	1–0	5–0	Friendly
7.	12 June 2012	Lang Park, Brisbane, Australia	Japan	1–1	1–1	2014 FIFA World Cup qualification
8.	6 February 2013	Avenida de Manuel Alvar, Málaga, Spain	Romania	1–1	2–3	Friendly

== Honours ==
Dynamo Moscow

- Russian Football National League: 2016–17

Sydney FC

- A-League Premiership: 2017–18
- FFA Cup: 2017

Australia

- AFC Asian Cup runner-up: 2011
- OFC Nations Cup: 2004

Australia U-20

- OFC U-19 Men's Championship: 2001

Individual

- PFA A-League Team of the Season: 2017–18
