= Aleksandr Lobkov =

Russian footballer

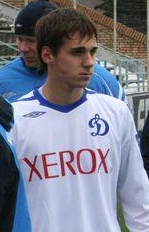

Personal information
- Full name: Aleksandr Nikolayevich Lobkov
- Date of birth: 17 December 1989 (age 36)
- Place of birth: Moscow, Soviet Union
- Height: 1.82 m (5 ft 11 1/2 in)
- Position: Defender

Youth career
- 1999–2002: FC Torpedo-ZIL Moscow
- 2003–2006: FC Dynamo Moscow

Senior career*
Years	Team	Apps	(Gls)
2007–2010	FC Dynamo Moscow	1	(0)
2011–2014	FC Khimik Dzerzhinsk	83	(1)
2014	FC Kaluga	17	(0)
2015	FC Vybor-Kurbatovo Voronezh	0	(0)
2015	FC Lada-Togliatti	7	(0)
- * Club domestic league appearances and goals

Aleksandr Nikolayevich Lobkov (Russian: Александр Николаевич Лобков; born 17 December 1989) is a former Russian footballer.
