= Yevgeni Puzin =

Russian footballer

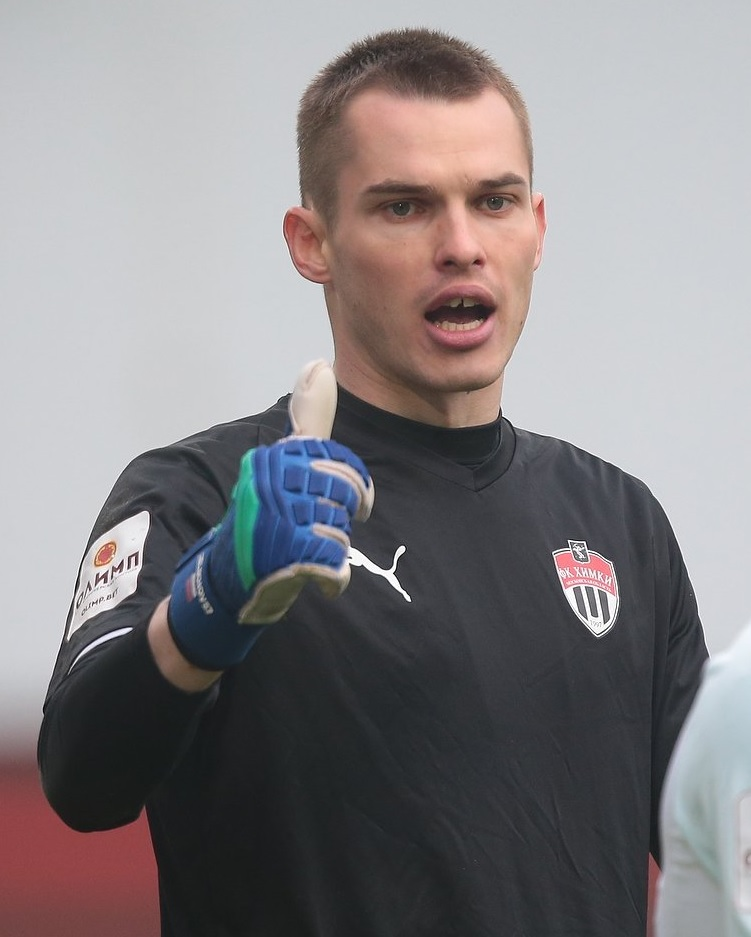
- Puzin with Khimki in 2019

Personal information
- Full name: Yevgeni Nikolayevich Puzin
- Date of birth: 20 March 1990 (age 36)
- Place of birth: Krasnodar, Russian SFSR
- Height: 1.87 m (6 ft 2 in)
- Position: Goalkeeper

Senior career*
Years	Team	Apps	(Gls)
2008	FC Sportakademklub Moscow	0	(0)
2009	FC Kuban Krasnodar	0	(0)
2010–2013	FC Dynamo Moscow	0	(0)
2012	→ FC Fakel Voronezh (loan)	3	(0)
2013–2014	FC Sibir Novosibirsk	13	(0)
2014–2015	FC Chernomorets Novorossiysk	13	(0)
2015–2016	FC Khimki	2	(0)
2016–2017	FC Afips Afipsky	3	(0)
2017–2018	FC Torpedo Moscow	1	(0)
2018–2019	FC Khimki	2	(0)
2018–2019	→ FC Khimki-M	19	(0)
2019–2020	FC Khimki-M	13	(0)
- * Club domestic league appearances and goals

Yevgeni Nikolayevich Puzin (Russian: Евгений Николаевич Пузин; born 20 March 1990) is a Russian former football goalkeeper.

== Club career ==
He made his Russian Football National League debut for FC Sibir Novosibirsk on 13 October 2013 in a game against FC Salyut Belgorod.
