= Timur Kalizhanov =

Russian-Kazakhstani footballer

Personal information
- Date of birth: 16 April 1993 (age 33)
- Place of birth: Nakhodka, Russia
- Height: 1.75 m (5 ft 9 in)
- Position: Attacking midfielder

Youth career
- 2000–2011: Dynamo Moscow
- 2012–2013: Neman Grodno

Senior career*
Years	Team	Apps	(Gls)
2013	Neman Grodno	4	(0)

International career
2013	Kazakhstan U-21	6	(1)
- * Club domestic league appearances and goals

Timur Kalizhanov (Russian: Тимур Булатович Калижанов; born 16 April 1993) is a Russian-Kazakh former professional footballer.

== International career ==
Kalizhanov represented Kazakhstan at 2013 CIS Cup. Before that, he represented Russia at several junior competitions.
