= Andriy Voronin =

Ukrainian football manager (born 1979)

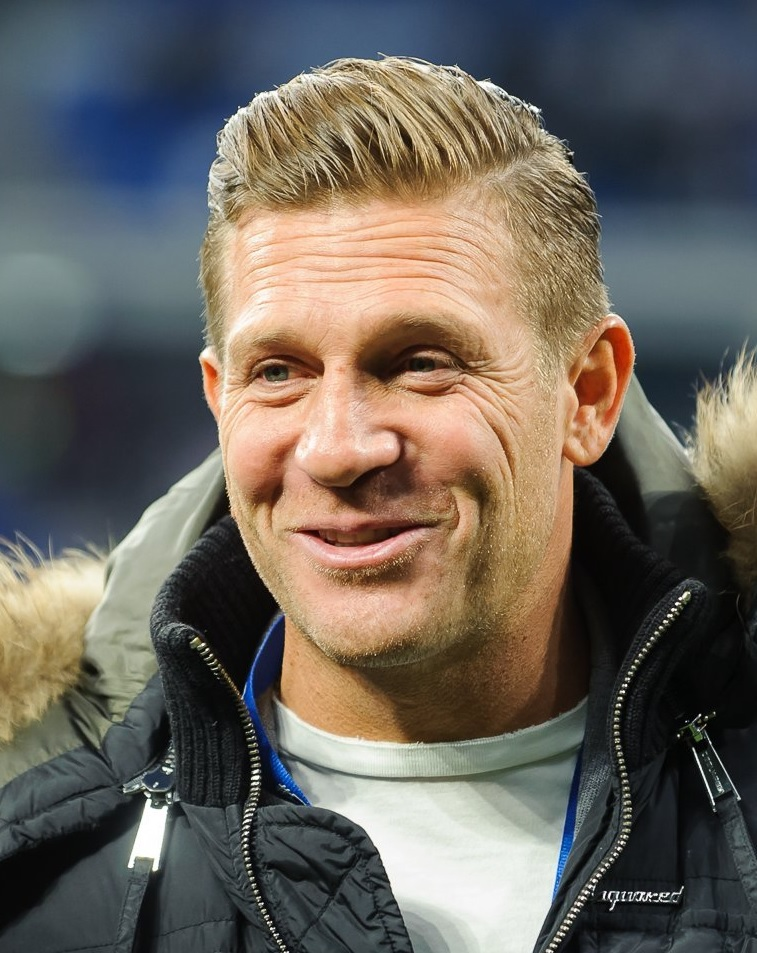
- Voronin in 2019

Personal information
- Full name: Andriy Viktorovych Voronin
- Date of birth: 21 July 1979 (age 47)
- Place of birth: Odesa, Ukrainian SSR, Soviet Union
- Height: 1.78 m (5 ft 10 in)
- Positions: Striker; attacking midfielder

Youth career
- –1995: Chornomorets Odesa
- 1995–1997: Borussia Mönchengladbach

Senior career*
Years	Team	Apps	(Gls)
1997–2000	Borussia Mönchengladbach	9	(1)
2000–2003	Mainz 05	75	(29)
2003–2004	1. FC Köln	19	(4)
2004–2007	Bayer Leverkusen	92	(32)
2007–2010	Liverpool	27	(5)
2008–2009	→ Hertha BSC (loan)	27	(11)
2010–2014	Dynamo Moscow	80	(22)
2012–2013	→ Fortuna Düsseldorf (loan)	10	(0)
Total		339	(104)

International career
2002–2012	Ukraine	74	(8)

Managerial career
- 2017: Büderich
- 2020–2022: Dynamo Moscow (assistant)
- * Club domestic league appearances and goals

Andriy Viktorovych Voronin (Ukrainian: Андрій Вікторович Воронін; Russian: Андрей Викторович Воронин, born 21 July 1979) is a Ukrainian professional football manager and a former player.

Voronin spent five full seasons in the Bundesliga of Germany, and last played as a striker or attacking midfielder for Dynamo Moscow.

His previous professional clubs include Borussia Mönchengladbach, Mainz 05, 1. FC Köln, Bayer Leverkusen, Liverpool, Hertha BSC and Dynamo Moscow. In the 2002–03 season, Voronin became top goalscorer in the 2. Bundesliga, which earned him a transfer to the Bundesliga club 1. FC Köln.

At international level, Voronin played 74 matches for Ukraine from his debut in 2002. He was in their squad for the 2006 FIFA World Cup and UEFA Euro 2012, after which he retired from international football.

== Early life and personal life ==
Voronin was born in Odesa on 21 July 1979, to a Russian father, Viktor Voronin (Russian: Виктор Воронин) and a Jewish mother, Rehina Voronina (Yiddish: רחינאַ וואָראָנינאַ). Both of his grandfathers fought against the Nazis in the Second World War. Voronin is married to his wife Yulia and they have four children together; Maria, Andriy Jr., Daniel and Sonja. He is a Ukrainian Orthodox Christian.

== Career ==
=== Borussia Mönchengladbach ===
Voronin left his youth club Chornomorets Odesa in 1995 to move to Germany, where he joined Borussia Mönchengladbach. He made his debut in the German Bundesliga against Bayern Munich in 1997 at the age of 18, but went on to spend a couple of years mainly in Mönchengladbach's youth teams. Having played just seven games and scored one goal in the top division, he saw his team relegated and after one season and just two matches in the 2. Bundesliga joined fellow second division strugglers Mainz for a fee of €45,000.

=== Mainz 05 ===
Voronin became Mainz' leading striker in his two seasons at the club, and in his third season became the top scorer in the 2. Bundesliga with 20 goals. Voronin's start to the 2002–03 season with Mainz prompted the following quote from German football daily kicker: "The star of the 23 year old forward is on a rise due to the new role he plays for the team – he has complete freedom of actions." This led to speculations about his future, with Dynamo Kyiv reported to be willing to bring him back to Ukraine.

VfB Stuttgart, Bologna and a number of other clubs were then reported to approach his agent and Mainz initiated negotiations to extend his contract. UEFA.com described Voronin as "one of the most sought-after talents in Germany." However, come the end of the season Mainz failed to win promotion. Voronin decided not to renew his contract and ultimately chose to continue his career with 1. FC Köln, who had just been promoted to the top division.

=== 1. FC Köln ===
Köln were relegated at the end of the season, however Voronin stayed in the top flight after signing for Bayer Leverkusen. Bayer had been interested in Voronin since his time at Mainz and were also impressed with his performance for Köln in a 2–2 draw against them when Voronin scored one and created the other of Köln's goals. After that game Express called him "the only true good footballer at Köln" and Bild wrote: "Köln's only striker (Voronin) was more dangerous than Bayer's entire star attack (Schneider, Ponte, Neuville and Berbatov)."

=== Bayer Leverkusen ===
After a successful first two seasons with Bayer as well as at the international level (culminating in participation in the 2006 FIFA World Cup in Germany where Ukraine reached the quarterfinals), Voronin's contract was running out at the end of the 2006–07 season and he was reported to have declined Bayer's offer of an extension. According to the player, he was approached by clubs from France, Spain, Italy and Scotland (Celtic were reported to be contemplating a move).

=== Liverpool ===
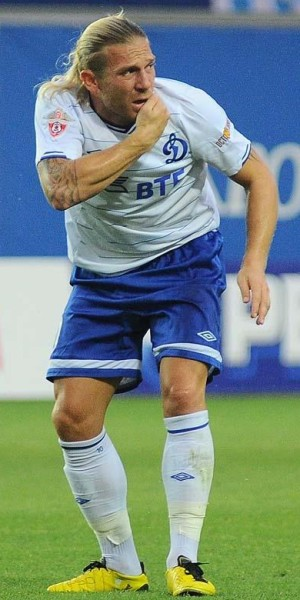
Voronin in action for Dynamo Moscow in July 2010

On 26 February 2007, Liverpool announced that they had signed Voronin on a free transfer and that he would join the team during the summer. Voronin was unveiled as a Liverpool player on 6 July 2007 after signing a four-year deal.

Voronin made his Premier League debut on 11 August 2007, coming on as a substitute in the 78th minute against Aston Villa in a 2–1 victory. A few days later on 15 August 2007, he scored his first ever goal for Liverpool in the 1–0 1st leg Champions League qualifier against Toulouse.

Liverpool manager Rafa Benítez was clearly impressed with Voronin, saying:

"He is clever, has great game awareness and gives us so many more options in attack. He can play behind a main striker, lead the line himself, or come into the attack from the flanks."

On 25 August 2007, Voronin scored his first Premier League goal against Sunderland in the 87th minute. He then scored his next goal in the next league game against Derby County which Liverpool comfortably won 6–0 to move top of the Premier League table. He also scored the first goal in the 2–2 draw with Tottenham Hotspur on 7 October 2007. He carried on his scoring record against Tottenham Hotspur by scoring in a win over the north London club on the last day of the season.

On 25 January 2008, Voronin injured his ankle during training. He underwent surgery and made a small number of appearances at the end of the season but failed to make an impact. This led to rumours that Benítez would sell him in order to raise funds for the summer 2008 transfer window, however Voronin played some of the summer friendlies scoring a total of 3 goals in the process.

He made his first start of the 2009–10 season in the Champions League group stage game against Lyon. He had a particularly poor day as he missed various opportunities to score including a one-on-one with Hugo Lloris. He was later substituted for Ryan Babel who scored Liverpool's goal.

=== Hertha BSC ===
On the last day of the transfer market Andriy Voronin agreed to be loaned to Hertha BSC for a season.

He had two goals in a 2–1 victory over Bayern Munich on 14 February, to propel Hertha into first place in the Bundesliga. On 7 March he netted a hat-trick against Energie Cottbus. On 11 April 2009, following a retaliatory foul against Leon Andreasen of Hannover 96, he was sent off, receiving the 1000th red card in Bundesliga history.

Voronin was unable to secure a permanent move back to Germany during the summer of 2009, and as a result he returned to the Liverpool squad for the start of the 2009–10 season.

=== Dynamo Moscow ===
On 8 January 2010, it was announced that Liverpool had accepted a £4 million offer for him from Dynamo Moscow, Two days later, Voronin officially signed for FC Dynamo Moscow.

=== Fortuna Düsseldorf ===
On 31 July 2012, Fortuna Düsseldorf announced to have signed Voronin for one year on loan from Dynamo Moscow.

== International career ==
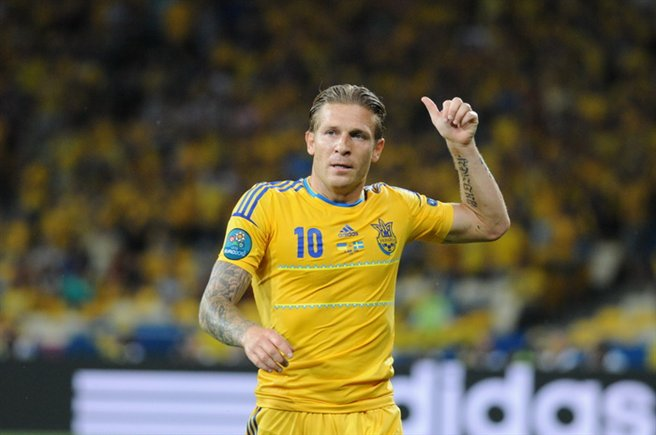
Voronin playing for Ukraine at UEFA Euro 2012.

While at Mainz, Voronin was called up initially to Ukraine's Under-21 team and in January 2002 to the national team, at the age of 22. He made his international debut in a 4–1 friendly defeat to Romania in March 2002. However, he was dropped after that match, with coach Leonid Buriak explaining, "I've been to Germany twice to watch him and made a conclusion that Andriy cannot compete with [Andriy] Shevchenko, [Serhii] Rebrov, and [Andriy] Vorobei as a forward. He can play in midfield as well, but he still has to improve some aspects of his game. Anyway, we count on Voronin, especially considering his young age."

Voronin was ultimately recalled to the national side, scoring his first international goal in a 2–0 Euro 2004 qualifying win over Greece in September 2002 and a second one in a 2–2 draw against Spain in March 2003.

He was in the Ukrainian squad for the 2006 FIFA World Cup, in which Ukraine got to the quarter-finals, beaten by the eventual winners, Italy.

played in the finals of Cyprus International Football Tournaments 2009, where Ukraine beat Serbia(1:0)

== Coaching career ==
On 14 October 2020 he returned to Dynamo Moscow as an assistant manager to Sandro Schwarz. Despite being half-Russian heritage through his father, as a proud former Ukrainian international and proud Ukrainian citizen, he left the club on 1 March 2022 after 2022 Russian invasion of Ukraine began, stating "I do not see any possibility of staying in a country (Russia) whose army destroys our (Ukrainian) cities & fires at civilians.”

== Career statistics ==
=== Club ===
Appearances and goals by club, season and competition
Club	Season	League			Cup		Europe		Total	
Club	Season	Division	Apps	Goals	Apps	Goals	Apps	Goals	Apps	Goals
Borussia Mönchengladbach	1997–98	Bundesliga	7	1	1	0	0	0	8	1
Borussia Mönchengladbach	1998–99	Bundesliga	0	0	0	0	0	0	0	0
Borussia Mönchengladbach	1999–2000	2. Bundesliga	2	0	0	0	0	0	2	0
Borussia Mönchengladbach	Total		9	1	1	0	0	0	10	1
Mainz 05	2000–01	2. Bundesliga	10	1	1	0	0	0	11	1
Mainz 05	2001–02	2. Bundesliga	34	8	2	1	0	0	36	9
Mainz 05	2002–03	2. Bundesliga	31	20	1	0	0	0	32	20
Mainz 05	Total		75	29	4	1	0	0	79	30
1. FC Köln	2003–04	Bundesliga	19	4	2	2	0	0	21	6
Bayer Leverkusen	2004–05	Bundesliga	32	15	4	0	6	2	42	17
Bayer Leverkusen	2005–06	Bundesliga	29	7	3	1	2	0	34	8
Bayer Leverkusen	2006–07	Bundesliga	31	10	2	0	10	2	43	12
Bayer Leverkusen	Total		92	32	9	1	18	4	119	37
Liverpool	2007–08	Premier League	19	5	2	0	7	1	28	6
Liverpool	2009–10	Premier League	8	0	1	0	3	0	12	0
Liverpool	Total		27	5	3	0	10	1	40	6
Hertha BSC (loan)	2008–09	Bundesliga	27	11	1	0	5	0	33	11
Dynamo Moscow	2010	Russian Premier League	26	4	3	0	0	0	29	4
Dynamo Moscow	2011–12	Russian Premier League	37	11	4	2	0	0	41	13
Dynamo Moscow	2013–14	Russian Premier League	17	7	0	0	0	0	17	7
Dynamo Moscow	Total		80	22	7	2	0	0	87	24
Fortuna Düsseldorf (loan)	2012–13	Bundesliga	10	0	1	0	0	0	11	0
Career total			339	104	28	6	33	5	400	115

=== International ===
Appearances and goals by national team and year
National team	Year	Apps	Goals
Ukraine	2002	4	1
Ukraine	2003	9	1
Ukraine	2004	6	0
Ukraine	2005	8	1
Ukraine	2006	13	2
Ukraine	2007	11	1
Ukraine	2008	5	0
Ukraine	2009	5	0
Ukraine	2010	3	0
Ukraine	2011	5	1
Ukraine	2012	5	1
Total		74	8

Scores and results list Ukraine's goal tally first, score column indicates score after each Voronin goal.

List of international goals scored by Andriy Voronin
No.	Date	Venue	Opponent	Score	Result	Competition
1	12 October 2002	Kyiv, Ukraine	Greece	2–0	2–0	UEFA Euro 2004 qualifying
2	28 March 2003	Kyiv, Ukraine	Spain		2–2	UEFA Euro 2004 qualifying
3	30 March 2005	Kyiv, Ukraine	Denmark	1–0	1–0	2006 FIFA World Cup qualification
4	8 June 2006	Luxembourg, Luxembourg	Luxembourg		3–0	Friendly
5	15 August 2006	Kyiv, Ukraine	Azerbaijan		6–0	Friendly
6	21 November 2007	Kyiv, Ukraine	France		2–2	UEFA Euro 2008 qualifying
7	1 June 2011	Kyiv, Ukraine	Uzbekistan		2–0	Friendly
8	28 May 2012	Kufstein, Austria	Estonia		4–0	Friendly

== Honours ==
Dynamo Moscow

- Russian Cup runner-up: 2011−12

Individual

- 2. Bundesliga top scorer: 2002–03
- Baltic and Commonwealth of Independent States Footballer of the Year: 2011
- Ukrainian Footballer of the Year: 2011
- Ukrainian Bravery Order III Degree: 2008
