= Leandro Fernández (footballer, born 1983) =

Argentine footballer

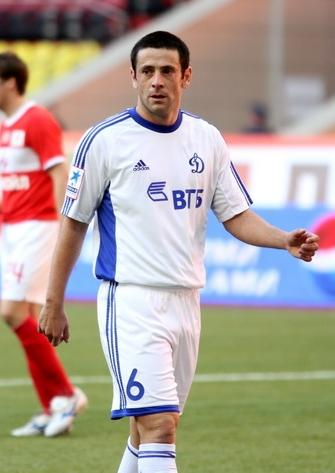
- Fernández with Dynamo Moscow in 2012

Personal information
- Full name: Leandro Sebastián Fernández
- Date of birth: 30 January 1983 (age 43)
- Place of birth: Rosario, Argentina
- Height: 1.79 m (5 ft 10 in)
- Position: Centre back

Youth career
- Newell's Old Boys

Senior career*
Years	Team	Apps	(Gls)
2002–2004	Newell's Old Boys	44	(0)
2005–2006	River Plate	19	(0)
2006–2014	Dynamo Moscow	207	(15)
2014–2017	Newell's Old Boys	40	(1)
2017	Danubio	19	(0)
Total		329	(16)

International career
2003	Argentina U20	7	(3)
2004	Argentina U23	0	(0)
2004	Argentina	5	(1)
Medal record
Men's Football
Representing Argentina
Olympic Games
Gold medal – first place	2004 Athens	Team competition
- * Club domestic league appearances and goals

Leandro Sebastián Fernández (born 30 January 1983) is an Argentine former professional footballer who played as a defender and was part of the gold medal Argentine team at the 2004 Summer Olympics. At the Olympics he was not initially part of the squad but was called up for the gold medal game to cover for the injured Nicolás Burdisso. He also got 4th place in 2003 FIFA World Youth Championship, and was part of the Argentina squad that were runners up in the 2004 Copa América.

Fernández started his professional career at the age of 15 when he joined Newell's Old Boys. In 2005, he transferred to the River Plate. Fernández joined Dynamo Moscow, Russian Premier League football club in 2006 and soon became one of this club fans' favorite and was voted "best Player of the Year" by Dynamo Moscow supporters.

== Honours ==
=== Club ===
Newell's Old Boys

- Argentine Primera División: Apertura 2004

=== International ===
- Gold Medal at the Summer Olympics: 2004 Athens
- Copa América runner-up: 2004

=== Individual ===
- Dynamo Moscow player of the year: 2005–06
