= Artur Yusupov (footballer) =

Russian footballer (born 1989)

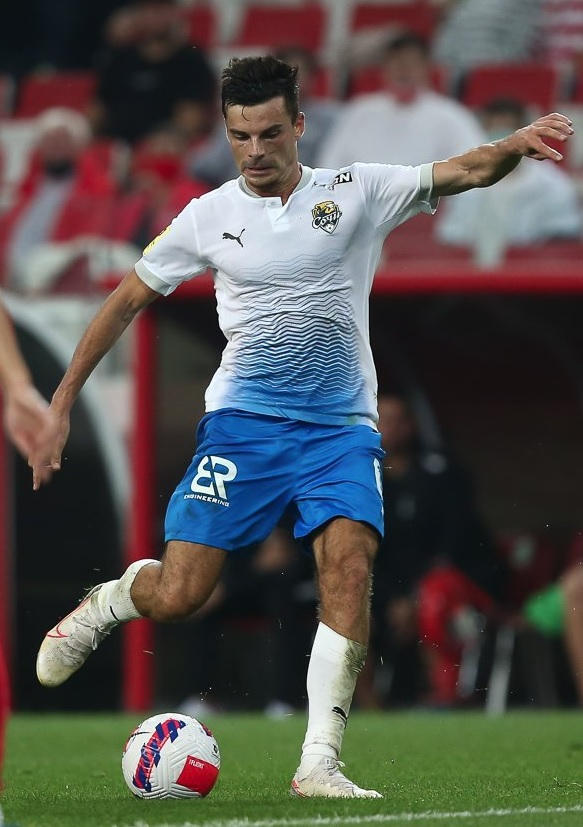
- Yusupov with PFC Sochi in 2021

Personal information
- Full name: Artur Rimovich Yusupov
- Date of birth: 1 September 1989 (age 37)
- Place of birth: Kuybyshev, USSR
- Height: 1.80 m (5 ft 11 in)
- Position: Midfielder

Youth career
- –1999: Zarya Samara
- 1999–2001: Lokomotiv Moscow
- 2005–2006: Konoplyov football academy

Senior career*
Years	Team	Apps	(Gls)
2006–2007	Krylia Sovetov-SOK	48	(3)
2008	Tolyatti	27	(3)
2009–2015	Dynamo Moscow	97	(6)
2010	→ Khimki (loan)	36	(7)
2015–2018	Zenit Saint Petersburg	40	(1)
2017–2018	→ Rostov (loan)	16	(1)
2018	Rostov	13	(0)
2019–2020	Dynamo Moscow	33	(2)
2020–2024	Sochi	98	(19)
2024	Khimki	0	(0)
2024	Ural Yekaterinburg	7	(0)

International career
2008	Russia U-19	9	(3)
2009	Russia U-21	1	(0)
2011–2012	Russia-2	3	(0)
2015–2016	Russia	2	(0)
- * Club domestic league appearances and goals

Artur Rimovich Yusupov (Russian: Артур Римович Юсупов, Tatar: Артур Рим улы Йосыпов; born 1 September 1989) is a Russian former professional footballer who played as a central midfielder.

== Club career ==
He made his professional debut in the Russian Second Division in 2006 for Krylia Sovetov-SOK.

He made his Russian Premier League debut on 8 November 2009 for Dynamo Moscow in a game against Spartak Nalchik.

He was released from his Zenit St. Petersburg contract by mutual consent on 25 July 2018 and signed with Rostov on the same day.

On 11 January 2019, his Rostov contract was dissolved by mutual consent. On 14 January he returned to Dynamo Moscow.

On 7 September 2020, he joined Sochi. On 31 May 2024, Yusupov left Sochi as his contract expired.

On 19 June 2024, Yusupov returned to Khimki. In Khimki's first 10 games of the season, Yusupov played 35 minutes in a Russian Cup game and appeared on the bench in one league game. On 14 September 2024, his Khimki contract was terminated by mutual consent.

On 19 September 2024, Yusupov signed with Ural Yekaterinburg in Russian First League. He left Ural in December 2024. Yusupov announced retirement from playing in January 2025.

== International ==
He made his debut for the national team on 17 November 2015 in a friendly game against Croatia.

== Honours ==
=== Individual ===
- Russian Premier League best goal of the month: August 2022.

== Career statistics ==
=== Club ===
As of match played 7 December 2024

Appearances and goals by club, season and competition
Club	Season	League			Cup		Europe		Other		Total	
Club	Season	Division	Apps	Goals	Apps	Goals	Apps	Goals	Apps	Goals	Apps	Goals
Krylia Sovetov-SOK	2006	PFL	22	1	1	0	–		–		23	1
Krylia Sovetov-SOK	2007	PFL	26	2	1	0	–		–		27	2
Krylia Sovetov-SOK	Total		48	3	2	0	—		—		50	3
Tolyatti	2008	PFL	27	3	2	0	–		–		29	3
Dynamo Moscow	2009	Russian Premier League	1	0	0	0	0	0	–		1	0
Khimki	2010	FNL	36	7	1	0	–		–		37	7
Dynamo Moscow	2011–12	Russian Premier League	26	1	4	0	–		–		30	1
Dynamo Moscow	2012–13	Russian Premier League	25	2	1	0	3 (Note: Appearances in the UEFA Europa League)	1	–		29	3
Dynamo Moscow	2013–14	Russian Premier League	24	2	1	0	–		–		25	2
Dynamo Moscow	2014–15	Russian Premier League	21	1	1	0	7	1	—		29	2
Zenit St. Petersburg	2015–16	Russian Premier League	23	0	4	1	6 (Note: Appearances in the UEFA Champions League)	0	1 (Note: Appearance in Russian Super Cup)	0	34	1
Zenit St. Petersburg	2016–17	Russian Premier League	17	1	1	0	2	0	1	0	21	1
Zenit St. Petersburg	Total		40	1	5	1	8	0	2	0	55	2
Rostov	2017–18	Russian Premier League	16	1	0	0	–		–		16	1
Rostov	2018–19	Russian Premier League	13	0	3	1	–		–		16	1
Rostov	Total		29	1	3	1	—		—		32	2
Dynamo Moscow	2018–19	Russian Premier League	12	1	–		–		–		12	1
Dynamo Moscow	2019–20	Russian Premier League	21	1	0	0	–		–		21	1
Dynamo Moscow	Total (3 spells)		130	8	7	0	10	2	—		147	10
Sochi	2020–21	Russian Premier League	23	7	4	2	–		–		27	9
Sochi	2021–22	Russian Premier League	26	8	1	0	3 (Note: Appearances in the UEFA Europa Conference League)	0	–		30	8
Sochi	2022–23	Russian Premier League	26	3	4	0	–		–		30	3
Sochi	2023–24	Russian Premier League	23	1	5	0	–		–		28	1
Sochi	Total		98	19	14	2	3	0	—		115	21
Khimki	2024–25	Russian Premier League	0	0	1	0	—		—		1	0
Ural	2024–25	Russian First League	7	0	2	0	—		—		9	0
Career total			415	42	37	4	21	2	2	0	475	48
