= Igor Semshov =

Russian footballer

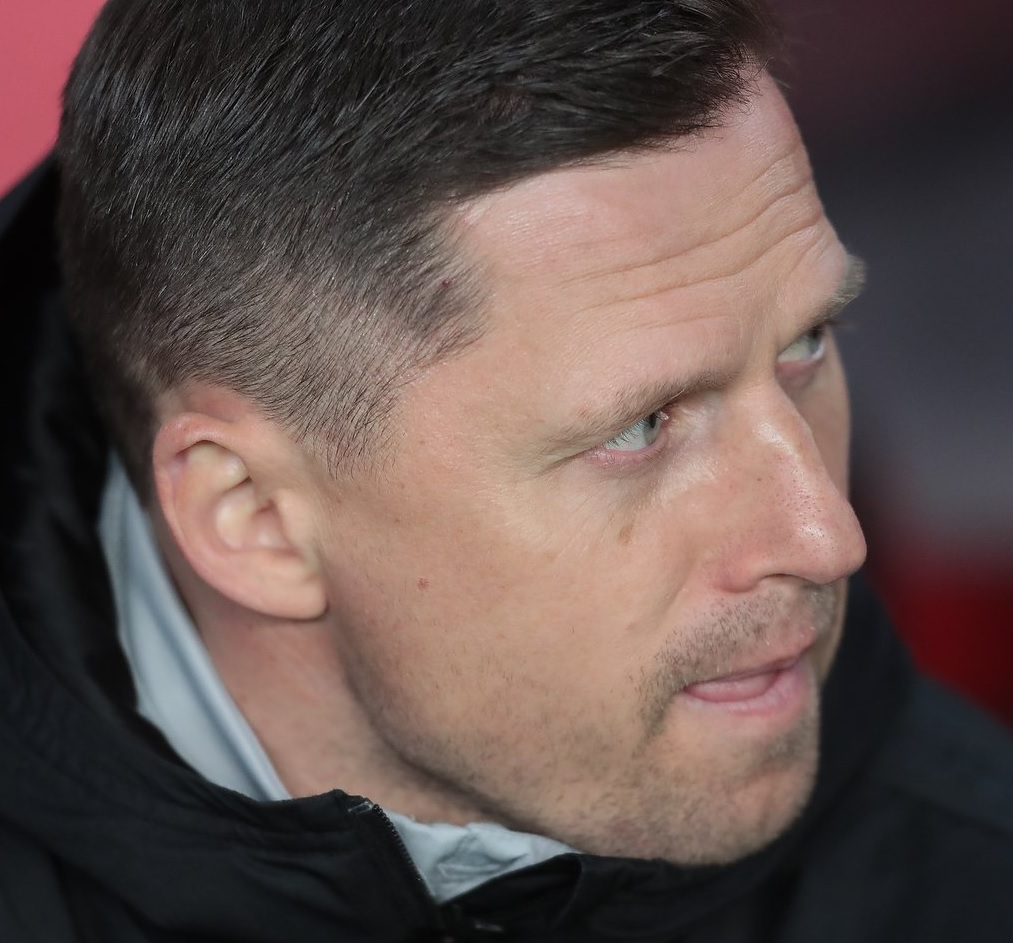
- Semshov coaching Arsenal Tula in 2019

Personal information
- Full name: Igor Petrovich Semshov
- Date of birth: 6 April 1978 (age 48)
- Place of birth: Moscow, Soviet Union
- Height: 1.70 m (5 ft 7 in)
- Position: Centre midfielder

Youth career
- 1995–1996: CSKA Moscow

Senior career*
Years	Team	Apps	(Gls)
1996–1997	CSKA Moscow	10	(1)
1996–1997	CSKA-d Moscow	55	(13)
1998–2005	Torpedo Moscow	216	(54)
1998–2000	Torpedo-d Moscow	9	(3)
2006–2008	Dynamo Moscow	85	(17)
2009	Zenit St. Petersburg	26	(6)
2010–2013	Dynamo Moscow	82	(19)
2013–2014	Krylia Sovetov Samara	14	(1)
Total		497	(114)

International career
1998–1999	Russia U-21	8	(0)
2002–2012	Russia	57	(3)

Managerial career
- 2017–2018: Arsenal Tula (assistant)
- 2018: Khimik Novomoskovsk
- 2018–2020: Arsenal Tula (assistant)
- 2020–2021: Khimki (assistant)
- 2021–2022: Khimki (assistant)
- 2022–2023: Chayka Peschanokopskoye
- * Club domestic league appearances and goals

Igor Petrovich Semshov (Russian: Игорь Петрович Семшов; born 6 April 1978) is a Russian professional football coach and a former player.

== Career ==
Semshov graduated from the CSKA academy in 1996, but was unable to hold a starting place and left for Torpedo Moscow in 1998 after only two seasons. He played well, and became one of the team's key players even earning a call up to the Russian National Team. In 2006, he was transferred to Dynamo Moscow and played there for two years but was put up for transfer in 2008 due to a failure to reach a contract agreement. On 15 December 2009 he moved to Zenit St. Petersburg for €4.5 million but returned to Dynamo the next season.

== Career statistics ==
Club	Season	League			Cup		Continental		Other		Total	
Club	Season	Division	Apps	Goals	Apps	Goals	Apps	Goals	Apps	Goals	Apps	Goals
CSKA Moscow	1996	Russian Premier League	2	0	0	0	–		–		2	0
CSKA Moscow	1997	Russian Premier League	8	1	1	0	–		–		9	1
CSKA Moscow	Total		10	1	1	0	0	0	0	0	11	1
CSKA-d Moscow	1996	Russian Third League	33	10	–		–		–		33	10
CSKA-d Moscow	1997	Russian Third League	22	3	–		–		–		22	3
CSKA-d Moscow	Total		55	13	0	0	0	0	0	0	55	13
Torpedo Moscow	1998	Russian Premier League	25	6	2	0	–		–		27	6
Torpedo Moscow	1999	Russian Premier League	28	3	1	0	–		–		29	3
Torpedo Moscow	2000	Russian Premier League	18	1	1	0	1 (Note: Appearances in the UEFA Cup)	0	–		20	1
Torpedo Moscow	2001	Russian Premier League	28	6	2	0	2	0	–		32	6
Torpedo Moscow	2002	Russian Premier League	28	11	0	0	–		–		28	11
Torpedo Moscow	2003	Russian Premier League	30	6	1	0	6	2	1 (Note: Appearance in the Russian Premier League Cup)	0	38	8
Torpedo Moscow	2004	Russian Premier League	30	9	1	0	–		–		31	9
Torpedo Moscow	2005	Russian Premier League	29	12	5	3	–		–		34	15
Torpedo Moscow	Total		216	54	13	3	9	2	1	0	239	59
Torpedo-d Moscow	1998	Russian Second League	1	0	–		–		–		1	0
Torpedo-d Moscow	2000	Russian Second League	8	3	–		–		–		8	3
Torpedo-d Moscow	Total		9	3	0	0	0	0	0	0	9	3
Dynamo Moscow	2006	Russian Premier League	28	6	5	0	–		–		33	6
Dynamo Moscow	2007	Russian Premier League	28	5	4	0	–		–		32	5
Dynamo Moscow	2008	Russian Premier League	29	6	2	0	–		–		31	6
Dynamo Moscow	Total		85	17	11	0	0	0	0	0	96	17
Zenit St. Petersburg	2009	Russian Premier League	26	6	2	0	6 (Note: Four appearances, one goal in the UEFA Cup, two appearances, two goals in the UEFA Europa League)	3	–		34	9
Dynamo Moscow	2010	Russian Premier League	29	5	2	2	–		–		31	7
Dynamo Moscow	2011–12	Russian Premier League	37	12	5	1	–		–		42	13
Dynamo Moscow	2012–13	Russian Premier League	16	2	2	0	4 (Note: Appearances in the UEFA Europa League)	2	–		22	4
Dynamo Moscow	Total		82	19	9	3	4	2	0	0	95	24
Krylia Sovetov Samara	2013–14	Russian Premier League	14	1	1	1	–		0	0	15	2
Career total			497	114	37	7	19	7	1	0	554	128

== International career ==
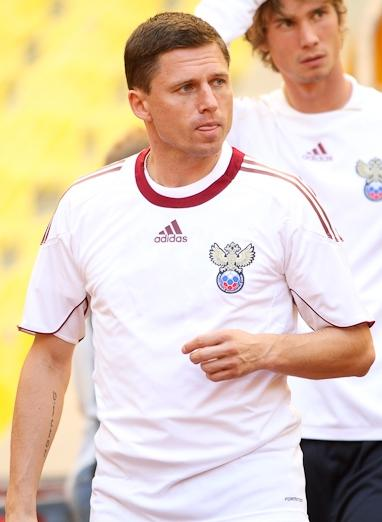
Semshov with the Russia national football team in 2011

Semshov was selected to play for the Russian national football team at the 2002 World Cup, but he did not manage to prevent a disappointing performance as he was played out of position on the left of midfield. He took a part at Euro 2004, but the tournament was a disappointment for him again. Russia fell at the first round and Semshov only played in the last match, which many felt was a poor decision.

He was again selected for Euro 2008. He scored his first goal in a friendly against Argentina.

He was confirmed for the finalized UEFA Euro 2012 squad on 25 May 2012.

=== International goals ===
#	Date	Venue	Opponent	Score	Result	Competition
1	2009-08-12	Lokomotiv Stadium, Moscow, Russia	Argentina	1 – 0	2–3	Friendly
2	2009-09-09	Millennium Stadium, Cardiff, Wales	Wales	1 – 0	3–1	2010 FIFA World Cup Qualifying
3	2011-09-02	Luzhniki Stadium, Moscow, Russia	Macedonia	1 – 0	1–0	UEFA Euro 2012 Qualifying

== Career honours ==
=== Club ===
Zenit St. Petersburg

- Russian Cup (1): 2010

=== International ===
Russia

- UEFA European Championship bronze medalist: 2008
