= Alexander Anatolyevich Yegorov =

Russian football referee

Alexander Yegorov
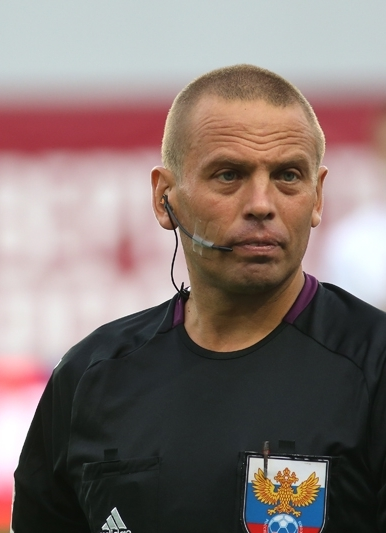
- Born: Alexander Anatolyevich Yegorov Russian: Алекса́ндр Анато́льевич Его́ров; 30 August 1972 (age 52); Saransk, USSR
- Citizenship: Russia
- Occupation: Referee
- Years active: 2011–2017

Alexander Anatolyevich Yegorov (Russian: Алекса́ндр Анато́льевич Его́ров; born 30 August 1972) is a Russian football official and a former football referee in the Russian Premier League.

== Career ==
Yegorov has been working as a referee in official Russian Football Union tournaments since 2000. He began refereeing matches as a head referee for the second-division Russian football league in 2001, and has worked as a head referee for the first-division Russian football league since 2007.

Yegorov's debut as a head referee in a Premier League match was in the 3rd round of the 2011–12 season between FC Volga Nizhny Novgorod and FC Dynamo Moscow.

On 15 June 2023, Yegorov was appointed general director of FC Ufa.
