= Dmitri Otstavnov =

Russian footballer (born 1993)

Personal information
- Full name: Dmitri Vladimirovich Otstavnov
- Date of birth: 4 June 1993 (age 33)
- Place of birth: Tula, Russia
- Height: 1.90 m (6 ft 3 in)
- Position: Forward

Youth career
- –2008: FC Lokomotiv Moscow
- 2009–2010: FC Dynamo Moscow

Senior career*
Years	Team	Apps	(Gls)
2010–2014	FC Dynamo Moscow	0	(0)
2014	→ FC Neftekhimik Nizhnekamsk (loan)	28	(9)
2015–2016	FC Rubin Kazan	1	(0)
2015–2016	→ FC Volga Ulyanovsk (loan)	24	(16)
2016–2017	Santa Clara	0	(0)
2017	Patro Eisden		
2017	FC Volgar Astrakhan	11	(1)
2017–2018	FC Volga Ulyanovsk	19	(6)
2018–2019	FK Trakai	0	(0)
2019	FC SKA Rostov-on-Don	11	(0)
2020–2021	FC Volga Ulyanovsk	5	(0)
2021	FC Zenit Penza	8	(0)

International career
2011	Russia U-19	5	(0)
2013	Russia U-20	1	(0)
- * Club domestic league appearances and goals

Dmitri Vladimirovich Otstavnov (Russian: Дмитрий Владимирович Отставнов; born 4 June 1993) is a Russian former football player.

== Club career ==
He made his professional debut in the Russian National Football League for FC Neftekhimik Nizhnekamsk on 10 March 2014 in a game against FC Torpedo Moscow.

He made his Russian Premier League debut for FC Rubin Kazan on 25 May 2015 in a game against PFC CSKA Moscow.

After spending the last few months of 2016 with the Portuguese Santa Clara and making only 2 bench appearance and playing no official games, in February 2017 he moved to the third-tier Belgian club Patro Eisden. Before playing any games in Belgium, he returned to Russia and signed for FC Volgar Astrakhan.

== Honours ==
- Russian Professional Football League Zone Ural-Povolzhye Top Goalscorer: 2015–16 (16 goals).
