= Artyom Yarmolitsky =

Russian footballer

Personal information
- Full name: Artyom Nikolayevich Yarmolitsky
- Date of birth: 10 April 1994 (age 32)
- Height: 1.79 m (5 ft 10 1/2 in)
- Position: Defender

Senior career*
Years	Team	Apps	(Gls)
2012–2015	FC Dynamo Moscow	0	(0)
2015–2016	FC Tom Tomsk	4	(0)
2016	→ FC Mika (loan)	4	(0)
2017–2018	FC Arsenal Tula	0	(0)
2018–2019	FC Khimik Novomoskovsk	25	(0)

International career
2014	Russia U-21	5	(0)
- * Club domestic league appearances and goals

Artyom Nikolayevich Yarmolitsky (Russian: Артём Николаевич Ярмолицкий; born 10 April 1994) is a Russian former football player.

== Club career ==
He made his debut in the Russian Football National League for FC Tom Tomsk on 31 August 2015 in a game against FC Shinnik Yaroslavl.
