= Pavel Yevseyev =

Russian footballer

Personal information
- Full name: Pavel Gennadyevich Yevseyev
- Date of birth: 28 November 1990 (age 35)
- Place of birth: Khimki, Russia
- Height: 1.88 m (6 ft 2 in)
- Position: Centre back

Youth career
- FC Dynamo Moscow

Senior career*
| Years | Team | Apps | (Gls) |
| 2009–2013 | FC Dynamo Moscow | 0 | (0) |
| 2014 | FC Zhemchuzhina Yalta | 7 | (0) |
| 2015–2016 | FC Syzran-2003 | 17 | (0) |
| 2016–2018 | FC Shinnik Yaroslavl | 46 | (2) |
| 2019 | FC Urozhay Krasnodar | 4 | (0) |
| 2019–2020 | FC KAMAZ Naberezhnye Chelny | 17 | (0) |
| 2020 | FC Shinnik Yaroslavl | 18 | (0) |
| 2021 | FC Tom Tomsk | 11 | (0) |
| 2021 | FC KAMAZ Naberezhnye Chelny | 5 | (0) |
- * Club domestic league appearances and goals

Pavel Gennadyevich Yevseyev (Russian: Павел Геннадьевич Евсеев; born 28 November 1990) is a Russian former football player.

== Club career ==
He made his professional debut in the Russian Professional Football League for FC Zhemchuzhina Yalta on 20 August 2014 in a game against FC Chernomorets Novorossiysk.

He made his Russian Football National League debut for FC Shinnik Yaroslavl on 11 July 2016 in a game against FC Baltika Kaliningrad.
