= Vitali Komisov =

Russian footballer

Personal information
- Full name: Vitali Yureyvich Komisov
- Date of birth: 11 July 1992 (age 34)
- Place of birth: Moscow, Russia
- Height: 1.75 m (5 ft 9 in)
- Position: Midfielder

Senior career*
Years	Team	Apps	(Gls)
2009–2012	FC Dynamo Moscow	0	(0)
2013	FC Khimki	2	(0)
2013	FC Fakel Voronezh	10	(0)
2014–2015	FC Zenit Penza	19	(0)
2015–2017	FC Dynamo St. Petersburg	48	(6)
2017–2018	FC Neftekhimik Nizhnekamsk	20	(4)

International career
2010	Russia U-19	2	(0)
- * Club domestic league appearances and goals

Vitali Yureyvich Komisov (Russian: Виталий Юрьевич Комисов; born 11 July 1992) is a Russian former football midfielder.

== Club career ==
He made his debut in the Russian Football National League for FC Khimki on 15 April 2013 in a game against FC Ural Sverdlovsk Oblast.
