= 2011–12 FC Volga Nizhny Novgorod season =

Volga Nizhny Novgorod
2011–12 season
- Chairman: Aleksei Goikhman
- Manager: Omari Tetradze
- Stadium: Lokomotiv Stadium
- Russian Premier League: 14th
- Russian Cup: Semifinals vs Dynamo Moscow
- Top goalscorer: League: Shota Bibilov (7); All: Shota Bibilov (8)
- Highest home attendance: 17,800 vs Zenit; 18 June 2011
- Lowest home attendance: 2,200 vs Terek Grozny; 22 March 2012
- Average home league attendance: 7,635
Home colours	Away colours	Third colours

The 2011–12 Volga season was the 1st season that the club played in the Russian Premier League, the highest tier of football in Russia.

== Squad ==
As of 24 January 2012, according to the RFPL official website.

Note: Flags indicate national team as defined under FIFA eligibility rules; some limited exceptions apply. Players may hold more than one non-FIFA nationality.

No.	Pos.	Nation	Player
1	GK	RUS	Vitali Astakhov
4	DF	RUS	Nikita Chicherin
5	MF	RUS	Andrei Karyaka
6	MF	RUS	Nikita Malyarov
7	MF	RUS	Vladislav Ryzhkov
8	DF	GEO	Gia Grigalava
9	MF	RUS	Aleksandr Shulenin
12	DF	ISR	Dani Bondar
14	MF	RUS	Aleksei Pomerko
17	FW	BIH	Petar Jelić
19	FW	BIH	Mersudin Ahmetović
21	MF	RUS	Ruslan Adzhindzhal
23	MF	ROU	Mihăiță Pleșan

No.	Pos.	Nation	Player
25	DF	RUS	Andrei Buivolov
26	DF	RUS	Sergei Bendz (on loan from Kuban Krasnodar)
29	FW	RUS	Shota Bibilov
31	GK	RUS	Ilya Abayev
32	MF	RUS	Aleksandr Budanov
33	DF	RUS	Inal Getigezhev
41	GK	RUS	Mikhail Kerzhakov
63	DF	RUS	Aleksandr Belozyorov
83	MF	RUS	Aleksandr Kharitonov
89	DF	RUS	Aleksei Mamonov
87	MF	RUS	Ilya Maksimov
98	FW	RUS	Dmitri Karasyov

== Transfers ==
=== Winter 2010–11 ===
In: Note: Flags indicate national team as defined under FIFA eligibility rules; some limited exceptions apply. Players may hold more than one non-FIFA nationality.

No.	Pos.	Nation	Player
3	DF	BRA	Leilton (from (Russia) Krylia Sovetov Samara)
4	DF	GEO	Lasha Salukvadze (from (Russia) Rubin Kazan)
8	DF	RUS	Gia Grigalava (from (Russia) SKA Rostov-on-Don, previously on loan to Rostov)
11	FW	GEO	Mate Vatsadze (from (Georgia (country)) Dinamo Tbilisi)
13	DF	HUN	Miklós Gaál (from (Russia) Amkar Perm)
14	MF	GEO	Gogita Gogua (from (Russia) Spartak Nalchik)
15	DF	RUS	Maksim Zyuzin (from (Russia) Nizhny Novgorod)
17	MF	RUS	Maksim Burchenko (from (Russia) Luch-Energiya Vladivostok)
19	FW	BIH	Mersudin Ahmetović (from (Russia) Rostov)
20	MF	ESP	Marc Crosas (from (Scotland) Celtic)
21	MF	RUS	Ruslan Adzhindzhal (from (Russia) Krylia Sovetov Samara)
22	MF	RUS	Artyom Anisimov (from (Russia) Saturn Moscow Oblast)
24	MF	RUS	Ruslan Pashtov (from (Russia) Dynamo Moscow)
26	DF	RUS	Sergei Bendz (from (Russia) Nizhny Novgorod)
27	MF	RUS	Aleksei Aravin (from (Russia) Sibir Novosibirsk)
28	MF	RUS	Aleksandr Semyachkin (from (Russia) Saturn Moscow Oblast)
29	MF	RUS	Shota Bibilov (from (Russia) Alania Vladikavkaz)
30	GK	RUS	Aleksandr Sholokhman
31	GK	RUS	Ilya Abayev (from (Russia) Anzhi Makhachkala)
35	MF	RUS	Roman Boldyrev (from (Russia) Nika Moscow)
37	DF	RUS	Aleksandr Kodenets
40	MF	RUS	Vladislav Gudoshnikov (free agent)
41	GK	RUS	Mikhail Kerzhakov (from (Russia) Zenit St. Petersburg)
44	DF	RUS	Vladislav Rikovskiy
47	MF	RUS	Dmitri Vershinin
51	MF	RUS	Roman Dzhigkayev
52	FW	RUS	Mikhail Sorochkin
53	DF	RUS	Pavel Averin (from (Russia) Tekstilshchik Ivanovo)
55	DF	RUS	Pavel Pashin
62	DF	RUS	Vasili Samokhvalov
63	DF	RUS	Aleksandr Belozyorov (from (Russia) Krylia Sovetov Samara)
66	FW	RUS	Alan Kadzhayev
71	GK	RUS	Mikhail Malyshev
73	FW	RUS	Vladislav Chernikov
77	FW	GEO	Otar Martsvaladze (from (Russia) Anzhi Makhachkala, previously on loan)
79	FW	RUS	Shamil Kurbanov (from (Russia) Saturn Moscow Oblast)
80	MF	RUS	Artyom Bragin (from (Russia) Saturn Moscow Oblast)
88	DF	RUS	David Kokhiya
91	DF	RUS	Artyom Abramov
92	MF	RUS	Ilya Syomin
93	MF	RUS	Ivan Strelov
99	MF	GEO	Gocha Khojava (from (Russia) Anzhi Makhachkala, previously on loan)

Out: Note: Flags indicate national team as defined under FIFA eligibility rules; some limited exceptions apply. Players may hold more than one non-FIFA nationality.

No.	Pos.	Nation	Player
2	DF	RUS	Aslan Zaseev (to (Russia) Chernomorets Novorossiysk)
5	DF	GEO	Edik Sadzhaya (to (Russia) Khimki)
6	MF	RUS	Dmitri Polyanin (on loan to (Russia) Nizhny Novgorod)
8	MF	RUS	Sergei Rashevsky (to (Russia) Ural Sverdlovsk Oblast)
10	FW	BIH	Petar Jelić (on loan to (Georgia (country)) Dinamo Tbilisi)
11	MF	RUS	Vitali Volkov (released)
13	MF	RUS	Maksim Semakin (to (Russia) Ural Sverdlovsk Oblast)
14	FW	RUS	Aleksandr Salugin (to (Russia) Nizhny Novgorod)
17	MF	RUS	Sergei Vinogradov (to (Russia) Sakhalin Yuzhno-Sakhalinsk)
19	FW	RUS	Oleg Kozhanov (to (Russia) KAMAZ Naberezhnye Chelny)
20	MF	BLR	Ihar Stasevich (to (Belarus) Gomel)
30	GK	RUS	Anton Kochenkov (on loan to (Russia) Rostov)
36	GK	RUS	Mikhail Levashov (released)
88	DF	GEO	Giorgi Navalovski (to (Russia) Khimki)
—	GK	RUS	Oleg Smirnov (to (Russia) Kaluga, previously on loan to (Russia) Khimik Dzerzhinsk)
—	DF	RUS	Dmitry Aydov (to (Russia) Nizhny Novgorod, previously on loan)
—	DF	CIV	Alli N'Dri (to (Russia) Shinnik Yaroslavl, previously on loan)
—	MF	RUS	Marat Khairullin (released, previously on loan to (Kazakhstan) Aktobe)
—	MF	RUS	Yevgeni Malakhov (released, previously on loan to (Russia) Metallurg-Oskol Stary Oskol)
—	MF	RUS	Rinat Mavletdinov (on loan to (Russia) Khimki, previously on loan to (Russia) Nizhny Novgorod)
—	MF	RUS	Sergei Osadchuk (to (Russia) Ufa, previously on loan to (Russia) Chernomorets Novorossiysk)
—	MF	UKR	Serhiy Pylypchuk (released, previously on loan to (Russia) Shinnik Yaroslavl)
—	MF	RUS	Oleg Trifonov (released, previously on loan to (Russia) Rotor Volgograd)
—	MF	RUS	Nikolay Vdovichenko (on loan to (Russia) Tekstilshchik Ivanovo, previously on loan to (Russia) Khimik Dzerzhinsk)
—	FW	RUS	Mikhail Mysin (to (Russia) SKA-Energiya Khabarovsk, previously on loan to (Russia) Rotor Volgograd)

=== Summer 2011 ===
In: Note: Flags indicate national team as defined under FIFA eligibility rules; some limited exceptions apply. Players may hold more than one non-FIFA nationality.

No.	Pos.	Nation	Player
5	MF	GEO	Zurab Arziani (from (Russia) Anzhi Makhachkala)
6	MF	RUS	Nikita Malyarov (from (Russia) Spartak Nalchik)
10	MF	ROU	János Székely (from (Romania) Steaua București)
12	DF	ISR	Dani Bondar (from (Israel) Hapoel Tel Aviv)
27	MF	MDA	Mihail Paseciniuc (from (Moldova) Olimpia)
34	MF	RUS	Yevgeni Degtyaryov
40	DF	RUS	Bogdan Belonogov
50	DF	RUS	Andrey Eshchenko (from (Ukraine) Dynamo Kyiv)
70	FW	AZE	Vagif Javadov (from (Netherlands) Twente)
81	GK	RUS	Fyodor Osin
87	MF	RUS	Ilya Maksimov (from (Russia) Kuban Krasnodar)}
95	MF	RUS	Ivan Maksimov
98	FW	RUS	Dmitri Karasyov

Out: Note: Flags indicate national team as defined under FIFA eligibility rules; some limited exceptions apply. Players may hold more than one non-FIFA nationality.

No.	Pos.	Nation	Player
3	DF	BRA	Leilton (released)
15	MF	RUS	Maksim Zyuzin (on loan to (Russia) Sibir Novosibirsk)
17	MF	RUS	Maksim Burchenko (to (Russia) Shinnik Yaroslavl)
26	DF	RUS	Sergei Bendz (to (Russia) Kuban Krasnodar)
27	DF	RUS	Aleksei Aravin (to (Russia) Spartak Nalchik)
35	MF	RUS	Roman Boldyrev (released)
37	DF	RUS	Aleksandr Kodenets (released)
40	MF	RUS	Vladislav Gudoshnikov (to (Russia) Volga Tver)
77	FW	GEO	Otar Martsvaladze (to (Russia) Krasnodar)
91	DF	RUS	Artyom Abramov (to (Russia) Zvezda Ryazan)
—	FW	BIH	Petar Jelić (released, previously on loan to (Georgia (country)) Dinamo Tbilisi)

=== Winter 2011–12 ===
In: Note: Flags indicate national team as defined under FIFA eligibility rules; some limited exceptions apply. Players may hold more than one non-FIFA nationality.

No.	Pos.	Nation	Player
4	DF	RUS	Nikita Chicherin (from (Russia) Dynamo Moscow)
5	MF	RUS	Andrei Karyaka (from (Russia) Dynamo Moscow)
17	FW	BIH	Petar Jelić (resigned)
26	DF	RUS	Sergei Bendz (on loan from (Russia) Kuban Krasnodar)
83	MF	RUS	Aleksandr Kharitonov (from (Russia) Tom Tomsk)
89	DF	RUS	Aleksei Mamonov (from (Russia) Lokomotiv Moscow)
—	DF	RUS	Maksim Zyuzin (end of loan to (Russia) Sibir Novosibirsk)

Out: Note: Flags indicate national team as defined under FIFA eligibility rules; some limited exceptions apply. Players may hold more than one non-FIFA nationality.

No.	Pos.	Nation	Player
4	DF	GEO	Lasha Salukvadze (to (Georgia (country)) Dila Gori)
5	MF	GEO	Zurab Arziani (to (Georgia (country)) Dila Gori)
7	MF	UZB	Sanzhar Tursunov (to (Russia) Alania Vladikavkaz)
10	MF	ROU	János Székely (to (Poland) Korona Kielce)
11	FW	GEO	Mate Vatsadze (to (Georgia (country)) Dila Gori)
13	DF	HUN	Miklós Gaál (to (Bulgaria) Slavia Sofia)
14	MF	GEO	Gogita Gogua (to (Georgia (country)) Dinamo Tbilisi)
16	FW	RUS	Anton Khazov (to (Russia) Tom Tomsk)
20	MF	ESP	Marc Crosas (to (Mexico) Santos Laguna)
50	DF	RUS	Andrey Yeshchenko (to (Russia) Lokomotiv Moscow)
70	FW	AZE	Vagif Javadov (to (Azerbaijan) Qarabağ)
99	MF	GEO	Gocha Khojava (to (Georgia (country)) Dila Gori)

== Competitions ==
=== Russian Premier League ===
==== Matches ====
14 March 2011 1	Volga Nizhny Novgorod	2–0	Tom Tomsk	Nizhny Novgorod
19:45 MSK (UTC+4)	Martsvaladze 5'; Bendz 15'	Summary		Stadium: Lokomotiv Stadium; Attendance: 14,000; Referee: Vladimir Kazmenko

21 March 2011 2	Spartak Moscow	1–0	Volga Nizhny Novgorod	Moscow
20:45 MSK (UTC+4)	Welliton 50'	Summary		Stadium: Luzhniki Stadium; Attendance: 10,000; Referee: Vladimir Pettay

2 April 2011 3	Volga Nizhny Novgorod	3–0	Dynamo Moscow	Nizhny Novgorod
16:15 MSK (UTC+4)	Pleşan 63'; Khojava 65'; Ahmetović 75'	Summary		Stadium: Lokomotiv Stadium; Attendance: 17,500; Referee: Aleksandr Egorov

10 April 2011 4	Rostov	1–3	Volga Nizhny Novgorod	Rostov
14:00 MSK (UTC+4)	Okoronkwo 81'	Summary	Khojava 45'; Khazov 52'; Tursunov 75'; Khojava (yellow card) 32' (yellow-red card) 82'	Stadium: Olimp–2; Attendance: 8,000; Referee: Timur Arslanbekov

17 April 2011 5	Lokomotiv Moscow	1–0	Volga Nizhny Novgorod	Moscow
14:30 MSK (UTC+4)	Ozdoyev 82'	Summary		Stadium: Lokomotiv Stadium; Attendance: 13,064; Referee: Sergey Lapochkin

23 April 2011 6	Volga Nizhny Novgorod	0–1	Kuban Krasnodar	Nizhny Novgorod
14:00 MSK (UTC+4)		Summary	Kulik 72'	Stadium: Lokomotiv Stadium; Attendance: 12,300; Referee: Yuri Baskakov

30 April 2011 7	Terek Grozny	1–0	Volga Nizhny Novgorod	Grozny
16:15 MSK (UTC+4)	Mguni 75'	Summary		Stadium: Sultan Bilimkhanov Stadium; Attendance: 9,300; Referee: Sergey Karasev

7 May 2011 8	Volga Nizhny Novgorod	1–2	Anzhi Makhachkala	Nizhny Novgorod
16:15 MSK (UTC+4)	Shulenin 28'	Summary	Holenda 55'; Lakhiyalov 67'	Stadium: Lokomotiv Stadium; Attendance: 9,500; Referee: Maxim Layushkin

14 May 2011 9	Spartak Nalchik	1–1	Volga Nizhny Novgorod	Nalchik
14:00 MSK (UTC+4)	Milic 59'	Summary	Vatsadze 90'	Stadium: Spartak Stadium; Attendance: 4,000; Referee: Aleksey Eskov

20 May 2011 10	Volga	Postponed^{1}	CSKA Moscow	Nizhny Novgorod
				Stadium: Lokomotiv Stadium

30 May 2011 11	Amkar Perm	1–0	Volga Nizhny Novgorod	Perm
17:30 MSK (UTC+4)	Peev 51'	Summary		Stadium: Zvezda Stadium; Attendance: 8,850; Referee: Almir Kayumov

10 June 2011 12	Volga Nizhny Novgorod	2–0	Krylia Sovetov	Nizhny Novgorod
19:30 MSK (UTC+4)	Martsvaladze 49' (pen.), 72'	Summary		Stadium: Lokomotiv Stadium; Attendance: 6,100; Referee: Vladimir Pettay

14 June 2011 13	Krasnodar	4–2	Volga Nizhny Novgorod	Krasnodar
21:00 MSK (UTC+4)	Movsisyan 3'; Kulchiy 44'; Joãozinho 61', 73'; Mikheyev (yellow card) 45' (yellow-red card) 69'	Summary	Khazov 16'; Salukvadze 63'	Stadium: Kuban Stadium; Attendance: 5,200; Referee: Yuri Baskakov

18 June 2011 14	Volga Nizhny Novgorod	0–2	Zenit St. Petersburg	Nizhny Novgorod
18:45 MSK (UTC+4)		Summary	Kerzhakov 9', 19'	Stadium: Lokomotiv Stadium; Attendance: 17,800; Referee: Aleksey Eskov

22 June 2011 15	Rubin Kazan	2–0	Volga Nizhny Novgorod	Kazan
18:45 MSK (UTC+4)	Bocchetti 49'; Kasaev 83'	Summary		Stadium: Central Stadium; Attendance: 12,720; Referee: Stanislav Sukhina

26 June 2011 16	Tom Tomsk	0–3	Volga Nizhny Novgorod	Tomsk
14:15 MSK (UTC+4)		Summary	Martsvaladze 18', 45'; Adzhindzhal 90+2'	Stadium: Trud Stadium; Attendance: 8,000; Referee: Aleksandr Egorov

21 July 2011 10	Volga Nizhny Novgorod	0–2	CSKA Moscow	Nizhny Novgorod
19:30 MSK (UTC+4)		Summary	Vágner Love 26', 65'	Stadium: Lokomotiv Stadium; Attendance: 17,000; Referee: Vitali Meshkov

24 July 2011 17	Volga Nizhny Novgorod	0–2	Spartak Moscow	Nizhny Novgorod
16:30 MSK (UTC+4)		Summary	Kombarov 27'; Welliton 67'	Stadium: Lokomotiv Stadium; Attendance: 17,500; Referee: Vladimir Kazmenko

31 July 2011 18	Dynamo Moscow	2–0	Volga Nizhny Novgorod	Moscow
18:45 MSK (UTC+4)	Semshov 59'; Samedov 90+5'	Summary	Grigalava (yellow card) 28' (yellow-red card) 29'	Stadium: Arena Khimki; Attendance: 14,935; Referee: Stanislav Sukhina

6 August 2011 19	Volga Nizhny Novgorod	0–1	Rostov	Nizhny Novgorod
21:00 MSK (UTC+4)		Summary	Bracamonte 82'; Boussaidi (red card) 83'; Gaţcan (yellow card) 65' (yellow-red card) 89'	Stadium: Lokomotiv Stadium; Attendance: 5,000; Referee: Sergey Lapochkin

14 August 2011 20	Volga Nizhny Novgorod	0–0	Lokomotiv Moscow	Nizhny Novgorod
17:00 MSK (UTC+4)		Summary		Stadium: Lokomotiv Stadium; Attendance: 8,000; Referee: Vladimir Kazmenko

21 August 2011 21	Kuban Krasnodar	5–0	Volga Nizhny Novgorod	Krasnodar
20:00 MSK (UTC+4)	Traoré 20', 45+1'; Bucur 53'; Komkov 70'; Davydov 89'	Summary		Stadium: Kuban Stadium; Attendance: 14,000; Referee: Timur Arslanbekov

27 August 2011 22	Volga Nizhny Novgorod	3–1	Terek Grozny	Nizhny Novgorod
17:45 MSK (UTC+4)	Tursunov 18'; Gogua 39'; Khojava 55' (pen.)	Summary	Pavlenko 85'	Stadium: Lokomotiv Stadium; Attendance: 4,800; Referee: Alexey Nikolaev

10 September 2011 23	Anzhi Makhachkala	2–1	Volga Nizhny Novgorod	Makhachkala
20:30 MSK (UTC+4)	Eto'o 17'; Roberto Carlos 59'	Summary	Pleşan 4'	Stadium: Dynamo Stadium; Attendance: 15,200; Referee: Aleksandr Egorov

17 September 2011 24	Volga Nizhny Novgorod	1–0	Spartak Nalchik	Nizhny Novgorod
16:30 MSK (UTC+4)	Malyarov 84'	Summary		Stadium: Lokomotiv Stadium; Attendance: 4,200; Referee: Maxim Layushkin

24 September 2011 25	CSKA Moscow	3–1	Volga Nizhny Novgorod	Moscow
18:15 MSK (UTC+4)	Doumbia 6'; Dzagoev 64'; Ignashevich 84' (pen.)	Summary	Bibilov 17'; Getigezhev (yellow card) 35' (yellow-red card) 45'	Stadium: Arena Khimki; Attendance: 5,000; Referee: Vladislav Bezborodov

1 October 2011 26	Volga Nizhny Novgorod	0–0	Amkar Perm	Nizhny Novgorod
16:15 MSK (UTC+4)	Bondar (yellow card) 20' (yellow-red card) 90+3'	Summary	Peev (yellow card) 75' (red card) 75'	Stadium: Lokomotiv Stadium; Attendance: 4,500; Referee: Aleksey Eskov

15 October 2011 27	Krylia Sovetov	0–0	Volga Nizhny Novgorod	Samara
18:30 MSK (UTC+4)		Summary		Stadium: Metallurg Stadium; Attendance: 12,960; Referee: Igor Fedotov

22 October 2011 28	Volga Nizhny Novgorod	0–2	Krasnodar	Nizhny Novgorod
14:00 MSK (UTC+4)		Summary	Martsvaladze 59'; Movsisyan 90+1'	Stadium: Lokomotiv Stadium; Attendance: 4,500; Referee: Sergey Kuznetsov

27 October 2011 29	Zenit St. Petersburg	3–0	Volga Nizhny Novgorod	Saint Petersburg
19:00 MSK (UTC+4)	Fayzulin 2'; Bukharov 37'; Lazović 69' (pen.)	Summary		Stadium: Petrovsky Stadium; Attendance: 19,350; Referee: Alexey Nikolaev

6 November 2011 30	Volga Nizhny Novgorod	1–0	Rubin Kazan	Nizhny Novgorod
18:30 MSK (UTC+4)	Bibilov 30'	Summary		Stadium: Lokomotiv Stadium; Attendance: 4,000; Referee: Stanislav Sukhina

Notes

- The Russian Championship tenth match-day fixture Volga vs CSKA was postponed due to a clash with the CSKA's participation in the Russian Cup Final

==== Table ====
Pos	Team	Pld	W	D	L	GF	GA	GD	Pts	Qualification
10	Rostov	30	8	8	14	31	45	−14	32	Qualification to Relegation group
11	Terek Grozny	30	8	7	15	29	45	−16	31	Qualification to Relegation group
12	Volga Nizhny Novgorod	30	8	4	18	24	40	−16	28	Qualification to Relegation group
13	Amkar Perm	30	6	9	15	20	39	−19	27 (Note: Amkar Perm ahead of Krylia Sovetov on head-to-head points; Amkar Perm–Krylia Sovetov 1–1, Krylia Sovetov–Amkar Perm 1–1.)	Qualification to Relegation group
14	Krylia Sovetov Samara	30	6	9	15	21	43	−22	27	Qualification to Relegation group

Source: Russian Premier League
Rules for classification: 1) points; 2) number of wins; 3) head-to-head points; 4) number of head-to-head wins; 5) head-to-head goal difference; 6) number of head-to-head goals scored; 7) number of head-to-head away goals scored; 8) goal difference; 9) number of goals scored; 10) number of away goals scored.

=== Russian Premier League – Relegation group ===
==== Matches ====
19 November 2011 31	Volga Nizhny Novgorod	1–2	Amkar Perm	Nizhny Novgorod
14:00 MSK (UTC+4)	Belozyorov 7'; Grigalava (yellow card) 38' (yellow-red card) 52'; Buivolov (red card) 86'	Summary	Grishin 60'; Burmistrov 61'	Stadium: Lokomotiv Stadium; Attendance: 3,800; Referee: Vladimir Kazmenko

26 November 2011 32	Krylia Sovetov	1–0	Volga Nizhny Novgorod	Samara
16:15 MSK (UTC+4)	Kornilenko 11'	Summary		Stadium: Metallurg Stadion; Attendance: 17,800; Referee: Almir Kayumov

3 March 2012 33	Volga Nizhny Novgorod	1–0	Spartak Nalchik	Nizhny Novgorod
14:00 MSK (UTC+4)	Bendz 61'	Summary		Stadium: Lokomotiv Stadium; Attendance: 2,700; Referee: Eduard Malyi

12 March 2012 34	Tom Tomsk	1–0	Volga Nizhny Novgorod	Tomsk
14:00 MSK (UTC+4)	Boyarintsev 41'	Summary		Stadium: Trud Stadium; Attendance: 7,500; Referee: Aleksey Eskov

17 March 2012 35	Volga Nizhny Novgorod	1–2	Krasnodar	Nizhny Novgorod
14:00 MSK (UTC+4)	Bibilov 52'	Summary	Movsisyan 49'; Martynovich 69'	Stadium: Lokomotiv Stadium; Attendance: 2,500; Referee: Stanislav Sukhina

26 March 2012 36	Terek Grozny	1–3	Volga Nizhny Novgorod	Grozny
19:00 MSK (UTC+4)	Maurício 22' (pen.)	Summary	Bibilov 52'; Karyaka 56'; Adzhindzhal 90'	Stadium: Terek Stadium; Attendance: 16,700; Referee: Igor Fedotov

31 March 2012 37	Volga Nizhny Novgorod	2–0	Rostov	Nizhny Novgorod
14:00 MSK (UTC+4)	Bibilov 6'; Karyaka 32' (pen.)	Summary		Stadium: Lokomotiv Stadium; Attendance: 5,200; Referee: Sergey Karasev

6 April 2012 38	Volga Nizhny Novgorod	0–0	Krylia Sovetov	Nizhny Novgorod
14:00 MSK (UTC+4)	Shulenin (red card) 70'	Summary		Stadium: Lokomotiv Stadium; Attendance: 2,600; Referee: Aleksandr Egorov

15 April 2012 39	Spartak Nalchik	3–0	Volga Nizhny Novgorod	Nalchik
14:00 MSK (UTC+4)	Kontsedalov 37' (pen.); Mitrishev 54'; Buitrago 76'	Summary		Stadium: Spartak Stadium; Attendance: 2,000; Referee: Evgeny Turbin

21 April 2012 40	Volga Nizhny Novgorod	2–0	Tom Tomsk	Nizhny Novgorod
14:15 MSK (UTC+4)	Karyaka 22' (pen.); Bibilov 90+2' (pen.)	Summary	Klimov (yellow card) 43' (red card) 90'; Ivanov (yellow card) 33' (red card) 90'	Stadium: Lokomotiv Stadium; Attendance: 5,300; Referee: Sergey Lapochkin

27 April 2012 41	Krasnodar	2–1	Volga Nizhny Novgorod	Krasnodar
19:30 MSK (UTC+4)	Movsisyan 4', 45'	Summary	Karyaka 71' (pen.)	Stadium: Kuban Stadium; Attendance: 5,300; Referee: Aleksey Eskov

2 May 2012 42	Volga Nizhny Novgorod	1–3	Terek Grozny	Nizhny Novgorod
19:15 MSK (UTC+4)	Shulenin 11'	Summary	Lebedenko 66'; Rybus 72'; Sadayev 78' (pen.)	Stadium: Lokomotiv Stadium; Attendance: 5,100; Referee: Maxim Layushkin

6 May 2012 43	Rostov	1–0	Volga Nizhny Novgorod	Rostov-on-Don
18:15 MSK (UTC+4)	Kirichenko 75'	Summary	Bendz (red card) 66'	Stadium: Olimp – 2 Attendance: 5,200; Referee: Vladislav Bezborodov

13 May 2012 44	Amkar Perm	4–1	Volga Nizhny Novgorod	Perm
15:30 MSK (UTC+4)	Narubin (red card) 11'; Volkov 32'; Novaković 38'; Peev 69' (pen.); Subbotin 81'	Summary	Bibilov 13' (pen.); Pomerko (yellow card) 43' (yellow-red card) 68'	Stadium: Zvezda Stadium; Attendance: 16,100; Referee: Aleksandr Egorov

==== League table ====
Pos	Team	Pld	W	D	L	GF	GA	GD	Pts	Qualification or relegation
9	Krasnodar	44	16	13	15	58	61	−3	61	
10	Amkar Perm	44	14	13	17	40	51	−11	55	
11	Terek Grozny	44	14	10	20	45	62	−17	52	
12	Krylia Sovetov Samara	44	12	15	17	33	50	−17	51	
13	Rostov (O)	44	12	12	20	45	61	−16	48	Qualification to Relegation play-offs
14	Volga Nizhny Novgorod (O)	44	12	5	27	37	60	−23	41	Qualification to Relegation play-offs
15	Tom Tomsk (R)	44	8	13	23	30	70	−40	37	Relegation to Football National League
16	Spartak Nalchik (R)	44	7	13	24	39	60	−21	34	Relegation to Football National League

Source: Russian Premier League
Rules for classification: 1) points; 2) number of wins; 3) head-to-head points; 4) number of head-to-head wins; 5) head-to-head goal difference; 6) number of head-to-head goals scored; 7) number of head-to-head away goals scored; 8) goal difference; 9) number of goals scored; 10) number of away goals scored
(O) Play-off winners; (R) Relegated

==== Relegation playoff ====
18 May 2012 1st Leg	Volga Nizhny Novgorod	2–1	Nizhny Novgorod	Nizhny Novgorod
20:00 MSK (UTC+4)	Maksimov 61', 65'	Summary	Salugin 32'	Stadium: Lokomotiv Stadium; Attendance: 7,150; Referee: Alexey Nikolaev

22 May 2012 2nd Leg	Nizhny Novgorod	0–0 (1–2 agg.)	Volga Nizhny Novgorod	Nizhny Novgorod
17:00 MSK (UTC+4)	Salugin (yellow card) 90' (yellow-red card) 90+3'	Summary		Stadium: North Stadium; Attendance: 3,100; Referee: Maxim Layushkin

=== Russian Cup 11–12 ===
17 July 2011 Round of 32	Shinnik Yaroslavl	0–1	Volga Nizhny Novgorod	Yaroslavl
18:00 MSK (UTC+4)		Report; Summary	Salukvadze 68'	Stadium: Shinnik Stadium; Attendance: 4,800; Referee: Sergey Lapochkin

21 September 2011 Round of 16	Spartak Moscow	1–1 (a.e.t.) (5–6 p)	Volga Nizhny Novgorod	Moscow
20:45 MSK (UTC+4)	McGeady 4'; Rojo (yellow card) 58' (yellow-red card) 75'	Report; Summary	Bibilov 86'	Stadium: Luzhniki Stadium; Attendance: 5,102; Referee: Sergei Kuznetsov
	Penalties
	D. Kombarov (penalty scored); Pareja (penalty missed) de Zeeuw (penalty scored); Sheshukov (penalty scored); Rodri (penalty scored); Carioca (penalty scored); Welliton (penalty missed)		Crosas (penalty scored); Javadov (penalty scored); Bibilov (penalty scored); Grigalava (penalty missed); Buivolov (penalty scored); Pashtov (penalty scored); Bondar (penalty scored)

22 March 2012 Quarterfinals	Volga Nizhny Novgorod	2–1 (a.e.t.)	Terek Grozny	Nizhny Novgorod
14:00 MSK (UTC+4)	Kerzhakov (red card) 45'; Bendz 68'; Karyaka 98' (pen.)	Report; Summary	Asildarov 45+5'; Rybus (red card) 120'	Stadium: Lokomotiv Stadium; Attendance: 2,200; Referee: Timur Arslanbekov

11 April 2012 Semifinals	Dynamo Moscow	2–1	Volga Nizhny Novgorod	Moscow
20:00 MSK (UTC+4)	Misimović 73' (pen.); Voronin 85'	Summary	Karyaka 19'	Stadium: Luzhniki Stadium; Attendance: 8,754; Referee: Maxim Layushkin

== Squad statistics ==
=== Appearances and goals ===
No.	Pos	Nat	Player	Total		Premier League		Playoff		Russian Cup	
No.	Pos	Nat	Player	Apps	Goals	Apps	Goals	Apps	Goals	Apps	Goals
1	GK	(Russia) RUS	Vitali Astakhov	11	0	8+0	0	0+0	0	2+1	0
4	DF	(Russia) RUS	Nikita Chicherin	11	0	8+0	0	1+0	0	2+0	0
5	MF	(Russia) RUS	Andrei Karyaka	15	6	10+1	4	2+0	0	1+1	2
6	MF	(Russia) RUS	Nikita Malyarov	23	1	9+10	1	0+1	0	2+1	0
7	MF	(Russia) RUS	Vladislav Ryzhkov	7	0	3+3	0	0+0	0	1+0	0
8	DF	(Georgia (country)) GEO	Gia Grigalava	37	0	30+1	0	2+0	0	4+0	0
9	MF	(Russia) RUS	Aleksandr Shulenin	27	2	19+3	2	2+0	0	2+1	0
12	DF	(Israel) ISR	Dani Bondar	15	0	11+1	0	1+1	0	1+0	0
14	MF	(Russia) RUS	Aleksei Pomerko	2	0	1+1	0	0+0	0	0+0	0
15	MF	(Russia) RUS	Maksim Zyuzin	6	0	2+4	0	0+0	0	0+0	0
17	FW	(Bosnia and Herzegovina) BIH	Petar Jelić	4	0	2+1	0	0+0	0	1+0	0
18	MF	(Russia) RUS	Sergei Yashin	5	0	4+1	0	0+0	0	0+0	0
19	FW	(Bosnia and Herzegovina) BIH	Mersudin Ahmetović	22	1	7+14	1	0+0	0	1+0	0
21	MF	(Russia) RUS	Ruslan Adzhindzhal	38	2	22+10	2	2+0	0	3+1	0
23	MF	(Romania) ROU	Mihăiță Pleșan	26	2	19+5	2	0+1	0	1+0	0
24	MF	(Russia) RUS	Ruslan Pashtov	5	0	3+1	0	0+0	0	1+0	0
25	DF	(Russia) RUS	Andrei Buivolov	22	0	18+1	0	0+0	0	3+0	0
26	DF	(Russia) RUS	Sergei Bendz	28	2	25+0	1	1+0	0	2+0	1
29	FW	(Russia) RUS	Shota Bibilov	25	8	19+1	7	2+0	0	2+1	1
31	GK	(Russia) RUS	Ilya Abayev	26	0	25+0	0	0+0	0	1+0	0
33	DF	(Russia) RUS	Inal Getigezhev	39	0	35+1	0	1+1	0	1+0	0
41	GK	(Russia) RUS	Mikhail Kerzhakov	15	0	11+1	0	2+0	0	1+0	0
63	DF	(Russia) RUS	Aleksandr Belozyorov	30	1	24+1	1	2+0	0	3+0	0
83	DF	(Russia) RUS	Aleksandr Kharitonov	16	0	6+6	0	2+0	0	1+1	0
87	MF	(Russia) RUS	Ilya Maksimov	17	2	12+2	0	2+0	2	1+0	0
89	DF	(Russia) RUS	Aleksei Mamonov	1	0	0+1	0	0+0	0	0+0	0
98	FW	(Russia) RUS	Dmitri Karasyov	3	0	1+2	0	0+0	0	0+0	0
Players who left the club on loan:
Players who appeared for Volga Nizhny Novgorod no longer at the club:
3	DF	(Brazil) BRA	Leilton	4	0	4+0	0	0+0	0	0+0	0
4	DF	(Georgia (country)) GEO	Lasha Salukvadze	16	2	15+0	1	0+0	0	1+0	1
5	MF	(Georgia (country)) GEO	Zurab Arziani	5	0	4+1	0	0+0	0	0+0	0
7	MF	(Uzbekistan) UZB	Sanzhar Tursunov	32	2	27+4	2	0+0	0	1+0	0
10	MF	(Romania) ROU	János Székely	8	0	6+1	0	0+0	0	1+0	0
11	FW	(Georgia (country)) GEO	Mate Vatsadze	21	1	8+12	1	0+0	0	1+0	0
13	DF	(Hungary) HUN	Miklós Gaál	6	0	4+1	0	0+0	0	0+1	0
14	MF	(Georgia (country)) GEO	Gogita Gogua	13	1	12+1	1	0+0	0	0+0	0
16	FW	(Russia) RUS	Anton Khazov	28	2	11+15	2	0+0	0	1+1	0
17	MF	(Russia) RUS	Maksim Burchenko	5	0	0+5	0	0+0	0	0+0	0
20	MF	(Spain) ESP	Marc Crosas	28	0	22+4	0	0+0	0	2+0	0
27	DF	(Russia) RUS	Aleksei Aravin	3	0	3+0	0	0+0	0	0+0	0
50	DF	(Russia) RUS	Andrey Yeshchenko	12	0	12+0	0	0+0	0	0+0	0
70	FW	(Azerbaijan) AZE	Vagif Javadov	12	0	4+7	0	0+0	0	0+1	0
77	FW	(Russia) RUS	Otar Martsvaladze	13	5	10+3	5	0+0	0	0+0	0
99	MF	(Georgia (country)) GEO	Gocha Khojava	12	3	9+2	3	0+0	0	0+1	0

=== Top scorers ===
Place	Position	Nation	Number	Name	Premier League	Playoff	Russian Cup	Total
1	MF	(Russia)	29	Shota Bibilov	7	0	1	8
2	MF	(Russia)	5	Andrei Karyaka	4	0	2	6
3	FW	(Georgia (country))	77	Otar Martsvaladze	5	0	0	5
4	MF	(Georgia (country))	99	Gocha Khojava	3	0	0	3
4	DF	(Russia)	26	Sergei Bendz	2	0	1	3
6	MF	(Romania)	23	Mihăiţă Pleşan	2	0	0	2
6	FW	(Russia)	16	Anton Khazov	2	0	0	2
6	MF	(Uzbekistan)	7	Sanzhar Tursunov	2	0	0	2
6	MF	(Russia)	9	Aleksandr Shulenin	2	0	0	2
6	MF	(Russia)	21	Ruslan Adzhindzhal	2	0	0	2
6	DF	(Georgia (country))	4	Lasha Salukvadze	1	0	1	2
6	MF	(Russia)	87	Ilya Maksimov	0	2	0	2
13	MF	(Georgia (country))	14	Gogita Gogua	1	0	0	1
13	FW	(Bosnia and Herzegovina)	19	Mersudin Ahmetović	1	0	0	1
13	FW	(Georgia (country))	11	Mate Vatsadze	1	0	0	1
13	MF	(Russia)	6	Nikita Malyarov	1	0	0	1
13	DF	(Russia)	63	Aleksandr Belozyorov	1	0	0	1
				TOTALS	37	2	5	44

=== Disciplinary record ===
Number	Nation	Position	Name	Premier League		Playoff		Russian Cup		Total	
Number	Nation	Position	Name	Yellow card	Red card	Yellow card	Red card	Yellow card	Red card	Yellow card	Red card
3	(Brazil)	DF	Leilton	1	0	0	0	0	0	1	0
4	(Georgia (country))	DF	Lasha Salukvadze	1	0	0	0	0	0	1	0
4	(Russia)	DF	Nikita Chicherin	1	0	0	0	1	0	2	0
5	(Georgia (country))	MF	Zurab Arziani	5	0	0	0	0	0	5	0
5	(Russia)	MF	Andrei Karyaka	3	0	1	0	1	0	5	0
6	(Russia)	MF	Nikita Malyarov	6	0	1	0	1	0	8	0
7	(Uzbekistan)	MF	Sanzhar Tursunov	2	0	0	0	0	0	2	0
8	(Georgia (country))	DF	Gia Grigalava	15	2	0	0	1	0	16	2
9	(Russia)	MF	Aleksandr Shulenin	8	1	2	0	2	0	12	1
10	(Romania)	MF	János Székely	2	0	0	0	0	0	2	0
11	(Georgia (country))	FW	Mate Vatsadze	2	0	0	0	0	0	2	0
12	(Israel)	DF	Dani Bondar	5	1	0	0	1	0	6	1
13	(Hungary)	DF	Miklós Gaál	1	0	0	0	0	0	1	0
14	(Georgia (country))	MF	Gogita Gogua	4	0	0	0	0	0	4	0
14	(Russia)	MF	Aleksei Pomerko	2	1	0	0	0	0	2	1
15	(Russia)	MF	Maksim Zyuzin	1	0	0	0	0	0	1	0
16	(Russia)	FW	Anton Khazov	3	0	0	0	0	0	3	0
18	(Russia)	MF	Sergei Yashin	1	0	0	0	0	0	1	0
19	(Bosnia and Herzegovina)	FW	Mersudin Ahmetović	1	0	0	0	0	0	1	0
20	(Spain)	MF	Marc Crosas	3	0	0	0	0	0	3	0
21	(Russia)	DF	Ruslan Adzhindzhal	10	0	1	0	1	0	12	0
23	(Romania)	MF	Mihăiță Pleșan	8	0	0	0	0	0	8	0
24	(Russia)	MF	Ruslan Pashtov	1	0	0	0	1	0	2	0
25	(Russia)	DF	Andrei Buivolov	3	1	0	0	1	0	4	1
26	(Russia)	DF	Sergei Bendz	6	1	0	0	1	0	7	1
27	(Russia)	DF	Aleksei Aravin	1	0	0	0	0	0	1	0
29	(Russia)	FW	Shota Bibilov	1	0	1	0	0	0	2	0
31	(Russia)	GK	Ilya Abayev	2	0	0	0	0	0	2	0
33	(Russia)	DF	Inal Getigezhev	10	1	0	0	0	0	10	1
41	(Russia)	GK	Mikhail Kerzhakov	1	0	0	0	0	1	1	1
50	(Russia)	DF	Andrey Yeshchenko	4	0	0	0	0	0	4	0
63	(Russia)	DF	Aleksandr Belozyorov	8	0	1	0	2	0	11	0
70	(Azerbaijan)	FW	Vagif Javadov	2	0	0	0	1	0	3	0
77	(Georgia (country))	FW	Otar Martsvaladze	2	0	0	0	0	0	2	0
87	(Russia)	MF	Ilya Maksimov	3	0	0	0	0	0	3	0
99	(Georgia (country))	MF	Gocha Khojava	3	1	0	0	0	0	3	1
			TOTALS	132	9	7	0	13	1	152	10
