= 2012–13 FC Volga Nizhny Novgorod season =

Volga Nizhny Novgorod
2012–13 season
- Chairman: Sergey Anisimov
- Manager: Gadzhi Gadzhiev until 7 June 2012 (Russia) Gadzhi Gadzhiev; 7 June 2012 - 19 January 2013; Yuriy Kalitvintsev from 19 January 2013
- Stadium: Lokomotiv Stadium
- Russian Premier League: 12th
- Russian Cup: Round of 32 vs FC Khimki
Home colours	Away colours	Third colours

The 2012–13 Volga season was the 2nd season that the club played in the Russian Premier League, the highest tier of football in Russia. They finished the season in 12th place and were eliminated from the Russian Cup at the Round of 32 stage by Russian National Football League side FC Khimki. Manager Dmitri Cheryshev was sacked during pre-season and was replaced by Gadzhi Gadzhiev on 7 June 2012 Gadzhiev then resigned on 19 January 2013 and was replaced by Yuriy Kalitvintsev.

== Squad ==
Note: Flags indicate national team as defined under FIFA eligibility rules; some limited exceptions apply. Players may hold more than one non-FIFA nationality.

No.	Pos.	Nation	Player
1	GK	RUS	Artur Nigmatullin (on loan from CSKA)
2	DF	KGZ	Valerii Kichin
3	DF	MDA	Simeon Bulgaru
4	DF	RUS	Dmitri Aydov
5	MF	RUS	Andrei Karyaka
6	DF	RUS	Dmitriy Polyanin
8	DF	GEO	Gia Grigalava
9	MF	RUS	Aleksandr Shulenin
10	MF	NED	Romeo Castelen
11	FW	RUS	Shamil Asildarov
13	MF	RUS	Dmitri Kudryashov
14	FW	ARM	Artur Sarkisov (on loan from Lokomotiv Moscow)
15	DF	RUS	Yegor Tarakanov
16	MF	BLR	Anton Putsila
17	MF	CRO	Matija Dvornekovic
19	MF	ROU	Adrian Ropotan

No.	Pos.	Nation	Player
21	MF	RUS	Ruslan Adzhindzhal
23	MF	ROU	Mihăiță Pleșan
24	MF	RUS	Ruslan Pashtov
25	DF	RUS	Andrei Buivolov
26	DF	POL	Piotr Polczak (on loan from Terek Grozny)
27	FW	RUS	Aleksei Sapogov
29	MF	RUS	Shota Bibilov
31	GK	RUS	Ilya Abayev
33	DF	RUS	Nikolai Zaytsev
37	DF	MDA	Vitalie Bordian
41	GK	RUS	Mikhail Kerzhakov
63	DF	RUS	Aleksandr Belozyorov
77	FW	RUS	Aleksandr Salugin
83	MF	RUS	Aleksandr Kharitonov
89	DF	RUS	Aleksei Mamonov
98	FW	RUS	Dmitri Karasyov

== Transfers ==
=== Summer ===
In: Note: Flags indicate national team as defined under FIFA eligibility rules; some limited exceptions apply. Players may hold more than one non-FIFA nationality.

No.	Pos.	Nation	Player
1	GK	RUS	Artur Nigmatullin (on loan from (Russia) CSKA Moscow, previously on loan to (Russia) Khimki)
10	MF	RUS	Sergei Vaganov (from (Russia) Nizhny Novgorod, June 2012)
11	FW	RUS	Shamil Asildarov (from (Russia) Terek Grozny)
14	FW	ARM	Artur Sarkisov (on loan from (Russia) Lokomotiv Moscow, previously on loan to (Russia) Shinnik Yaroslavl)
27	FW	RUS	Aleksei Sapogov (from (Russia) Gornyak Uchaly)
33	DF	RUS	Nikolai Zaytsev (from (Russia) Gazovik Orenburg)
—	DF	RUS	Dmitri Aydov (from (Russia) Nizhny Novgorod)
—	DF	GEO	Giorgi Navalovski (end of loan to (Russia) Khimki)
—	DF	RUS	Yegor Tarakanov (from (Russia) Krasnodar, previously on loan to (Russia) Nizhny Novgorod)
—	MF	RUS	Maksim Burchenko (end of loan to (Russia) Shinnik Yaroslavl)
—	MF	RUS	Dmitri Kudryashov (from (Russia) Nizhny Novgorod)
—	MF	RUS	Dmitri Polyanin (end of loan to (Russia) Nizhny Novgorod)
—	FW	CRO	Matija Dvorneković (from (Russia) Nizhny Novgorod)
—	FW	RUS	Aleksandr Salugin (end of loan to (Russia) Nizhny Novgorod)

Out: Note: Flags indicate national team as defined under FIFA eligibility rules; some limited exceptions apply. Players may hold more than one non-FIFA nationality.

No.	Pos.	Nation	Player
1	GK	RUS	Vitali Astakhov (to (Russia) Tom Tomsk)
4	DF	RUS	Nikita Chicherin (end of loan from (Russia) Dynamo Moscow)
10	MF	RUS	Sergei Vaganov (on loan to (Russia) Rotor Volgograd, August 2012)
14	MF	RUS	Aleksei Pomerko (to (Russia) Khimki)
26	DF	RUS	Sergei Bendz (to (Russia) Tom Tomsk on loan from (Russia) Kuban Krasnodar)
32	MF	RUS	Aleksandr Budanov (contract expired)
33	DF	RUS	Inal Getigezhev (to (Russia) Rostov)
—	MF	RUS	Maksim Zyuzin (to (Russia) SKA-Energiya Khabarovsk, previously on loan to (Russia) Sibir Novosibirsk)

=== Winter ===
In: Note: Flags indicate national team as defined under FIFA eligibility rules; some limited exceptions apply. Players may hold more than one non-FIFA nationality.

No.	Pos.	Nation	Player
2	DF	KGZ	Valerii Kichin (from (Kyrgyzstan) Dordoi)
3	DF	MDA	Simeon Bulgaru (from (Russia) Alania Vladikavkaz)
10	MF	NED	Romeo Castelen (from (Germany) Hamburger SV)
16	MF	BLR	Anton Putsila (from (Germany) SC Freiburg)
19	MF	ROU	Adrian Ropotan (from (Russia) Dynamo Moscow)
26	DF	POL	Piotr Polczak (on loan from (Russia) Terek Grozny)
37	DF	MDA	Vitalie Bordian (from (Ukraine) Hoverla)

Out: Note: Flags indicate national team as defined under FIFA eligibility rules; some limited exceptions apply. Players may hold more than one non-FIFA nationality.

No.	Pos.	Nation	Player
7	MF	RUS	Vladislav Ryzhkov (to (Russia) FC Fakel Voronezh)
12	DF	ISR	Dani Bondar (released)
19	MF	BIH	Mersudin Ahmetović (to (Russia) FC Salyut Belgorod)
87	MF	RUS	Ilya Maksimov (to (Russia) Krylia Sovetov)

== Competitions ==
=== Russian Premier League ===
==== Matches ====
21 July 2012 1	Volga Nizhny Novgorod	1 – 0	Dynamo Moscow	Nizhny Novgorod
16:30 MSK (UTC+4)	Maksimov (red card) 51'; Shulenin 69'	Summary		Stadium: Lokomotiv Stadium; Attendance: 6,100; Referee: Sergey Lapochkin

28 July 2012 2	Spartak Moscow	2 – 1	Volga Nizhny Novgorod	Moscow
17:30 MSK (UTC+4)	McGeady 69'; Kombarov 90+1' (pen.)	Summary	Sapogov 33'	Stadium: Luzhniki Stadium; Attendance: 20,357; Referee: Sergey Kuznetsov

6 August 2012 3	Volga Nizhny Novgorod	1 – 2	Rubin Kazan	Nizhny Novgorod
18:00 MSK (UTC+4)	Kharitonov 14'	Summary	Karadeniz 56'; Eremenko 73'; Bocchetti (red card) 90+4'	Stadium: Lokomotiv Stadium; Attendance: 6,700; Referee: Timur Arslanbekov

11 August 2012 4	Terek Grozny	2 – 0	Volga Nizhny Novgorod	Grozny
19:30 MSK (UTC+4)	Lebedenko 15', 90+3'	Summary		Stadium: Sultan Bilimkhanov Stadium; Attendance: 14,300; Referee: Eduard Malyi

18 August 2012 5	Volga Nizhny Novgorod	0 – 2	Lokomotiv Moscow	Nizhny Novgorod
17:30 MSK (UTC+4)		Summary	Caicedo 65'; Glushakov 86'	Stadium: Lokomotiv Stadium; Attendance: 9,200; Referee: Vladislav Bezborodov

27 August 2012 6	Kuban Krasnodar	6 – 2	Volga Nizhny Novgorod	Krasnodar, Krasnodar Krai
19:30 MSK (UTC+4)	Tsorayev 1'; Pizzelli 13', 47'; Baldé 44', 69'; Niculae 76'	Summary	Asildarov 53' (pen.); Sapogov 78'	Stadium: Kuban Stadium; Attendance: 11,700; Referee: Maxim Layushkin

1 September 2012 7	Volga Nizhny Novgorod	1 – 1	Rostov	Nizhny Novgorod
16:30 MSK (UTC+4)	Buivolov (red card) 29'; Sapogov 87'	Summary	Blatnjak 9'	Stadium: Lokomotiv Stadium; Attendance: 2,000; Referee: Vasiliy Kazartsev

17 September 2012 8	Amkar Perm	3 – 2	Volga Nizhny Novgorod	Perm
17:30 MSK (UTC+4)	Peev 45' (pen.), 77' (pen.); Picușceac 89'	Summary	Sapogov 47'; Grigalava 66'	Stadium: Zvezda Stadium; Attendance: 5,800; Referee: Evgeny Turbin

22 September 2012 9	Volga Nizhny Novgorod	2 – 3	CSKA Moscow	Nizhny Novgorod
13:30 MSK (UTC+4)	Maksimov 21'; Sapogov 43'	Summary	Dzagoev 57', 69'; Musa 87'	Stadium: Lokomotiv Stadium; Attendance: 13,200; Referee: Vitali Meshkov

30 September 2012 10	Anzhi Makhachkala	2 – 1	Volga Nizhny Novgorod	Makhachkala
16:00 MSK (UTC+4)	Eto'o 45+1'; Traore 62'	Summary	Maksimov 59'	Stadium: Dynamo Stadium; Attendance: 14,100; Referee: Maxim Layushkin

6 October 2012 11	Volga Nizhny Novgorod	0 – 2	Mordovia Saransk	Nizhny Novgorod
16:30 MSK (UTC+4)		Summary	Ruslan Mukhametshin 11' (pen.); Panchenko 89'	Stadium: Lokomotiv Stadium; Attendance: 3,100; Referee: Sergey Karasev

22 October 2012 12	Krylia Sovetov Samara	0 – 1	Volga Nizhny Novgorod	Samara
19:00 MSK (UTC+4)		Summary	Belozyorov 68'	Stadium: Metallurg Stadion; Attendance: 7,534; Referee: Timur Arslanbekov

27 October 2012 13	Volga Nizhny Novgorod	1 – 1	Krasnodar	Nizhny Novgorod
16:00 MSK (UTC+4)	Bibilov 64'	Summary	Koman 79'	Stadium: Lokomotiv Stadium; Attendance: 3,100; Referee: Sergey Kostevich

5 November 2012 14	Alania Vladikavkaz	0 – 2	Volga Nizhny Novgorod	Vladikavkaz
19:00 MSK (UTC+4)		Summary	Sapogov 68'; Maksimov 74'	Stadium: Republican Spartak Stadium; Attendance: 8,000; Referee: Alexey Wikolaev

10 November 2012 15	Volga Nizhny Novgorod	1 – 2	Zenit St. Petersburg	Nizhny Novgorod
18:00 MSK (UTC+4)	Maksimov 90'	Summary	Anyukov 32'; Kerzhakov 90+1'	Stadium: Lokomotiv Stadium; Attendance: 10,700; Referee: Vladimir Kazmenko

17 November 2012 16	Volga Nizhny Novgorod	1 – 1	Spartak Moscow	Nizhny Novgorod
13:30 MSK (UTC+4)	Salugin 45+3'	Summary	Kombarov 14'	Stadium: Lokomotiv Stadium; Attendance: 13,500; Referee: Vasiliy Kazartsev

26 November 2012 17	Rubin Kazan	0 – 0	Volga Nizhny Novgorod	Kazan
17:45 MSK (UTC+4)		Summary	Sapogov (red card)	Stadium: Tsentralnyi Stadion; Attendance: 5,701; Referee: Sergey Ivanov

1 December 2012 18	Volga Nizhny Novgorod	1 – 1	Terek Grozny	Nizhny Novgorod
18:30 MSK (UTC+4)	Asildarov 53'	Summary	Ivanov 8'	Stadium: Lokomotiv Stadium; Attendance: 3,200; Referee: Maxim Layushkin

8 December 2012 19	Lokomotiv Moscow	0 – 1	Volga Nizhny Novgorod	Moscow
17:00 MSK (UTC+4)		Summary	Asildarov 39'	Stadium: Lokomotiv Stadium; Attendance: 8,214; Referee: Sergei Karasev

8 March 2013 20	Volga Nizhny Novgorod	0 – 2	Kuban Krasnodar	Nizhny Novgorod
13:30 MSK (UTC+4)		Summary	Özbiliz 20'; Tlisov 90+1'	Stadium: Lokomotiv Stadium; Attendance: 7,400; Referee: Aleksey Eskov

15 March 2013 21	Rostov	1 – 2	Volga Nizhny Novgorod	Rostov
19:00 MSK (UTC+4)	Kirichenko 80'	Summary	Sarkisov 31', 63'	Stadium: Olimp - 2 Attendance: 10,000; Referee: Vladislav Bezborodov

31 March 2013 22	Volga Nizhny Novgorod	1 – 1	Amkar Perm	Nizhny Novgorod
13:30 MSK (UTC+4)	Sapogov 69' (pen.)	Summary	Peev 60' (pen.)	Stadium: Lokomotiv Stadium; Attendance: 7,200; Referee: Sergey Lapochkin

6 April 2013 23	CSKA Moscow	2 – 0	Volga Nizhny Novgorod	Moscow
15:00 MSK (UTC+4)	Dzagoev 30'; Love 35' (yellow card) 89' (yellow-red card) 90+4'	Summary	Bulgaru (yellow card) 52'; Zaytsev (yellow card) 63'; Sapogov (yellow card) 89'	Stadium: Luzhniki Stadium; Attendance: 7,857; Referee: Vladimir Kazmenko

14 April 2013 24	Volga Nizhny Novgorod	0 – 3	Anzhi Makhachkala	Nizhny Novgorod
14:00 MSK (UTC+4)	Ropotan (yellow card) 26' (yellow-red card) 67'	Summary	Spahić 34'; Traore 40'; Willian 73'	Stadium: Lokomotiv Stadium; Attendance: 12,000; Referee: Vladislav Bezborodov

20 April 2013 25	Mordovia Saransk	1 – 3	Volga Nizhny Novgorod	Saransk
13:30 MSK (UTC+4)	Ruslan Mukhametshin 40'	Summary	Sapogov 79' (pen.); Belozyorov 83'; Sarkisov 86'	Stadium: Start Stadium; Attendance: 4,000; Referee: Sergey Kostevich

26 April 2012 26	Volga Nizhny Novgorod	1 – 1	Krylia Sovetov Samara	Nizhny Novgorod
19:00 MSK (UTC+4)	Karyaka 38' (pen.)	Summary	Caballero 82' (pen.)	Stadium: Lokomotiv Stadium; Attendance: 7,700; Referee: Timur Arslanbekov

5 May 2013 27	Krasnodar	2 – 0	Volga Nizhny Novgorod	Krasnodar
18:30 MSK (UTC+4)	Petrov 22'; Isael 42'; Konaté (red card) 90'	Summary		Stadium: Kuban Stadium; Attendance: 5,300; Referee: Maxim Layushkin

11 May 2013 28	Volga Nizhny Novgorod	1 – 0	Alania Vladikavkaz	Nizhny Novgorod
16:00 MSK (UTC+4)	Karyaka 45' (pen.)	Summary	Grigoryev (red card) 18'	Stadium: Lokomotiv Stadium; Attendance: 7,500; Referee: Sergey Lapochkin

19 May 2013 29	Zenit St. Petersburg	3 – 1	Volga Nizhny Novgorod	Saint Petersburg
18:30 MSK (UTC+4)	Neto 34'; Fayzulin 20'; Shirokov 90+1'; Shirokov (red card) 90+2'	Summary	Shulenin 17'; Karyaka (yellow card) 10' (yellow-red card) 76'	Stadium: Petrovsky Stadium; Attendance: 18,604; Referee: Aleksandr Egorov

26 May 2013 30	Dynamo Moscow	0 – 0	Volga Nizhny Novgorod	Moscow
13:30 MSK (UTC+4)		Summary		Stadium: Arena Khimki; Attendance: 6,112; Referee: Vladislav Bezborodov

==== Table ====
Pos	Team	Pld	W	D	L	GF	GA	GD	Pts	Qualification or relegation
10	Krasnodar	30	12	6	12	45	39	+6	42	
11	Amkar Perm	30	7	8	15	34	51	−17	29 (Note: Amkar Perm ahead of Volga Nizhny Novgorod and Rostov on head-to-head points; Amkar Perm: 7 pts, Volga Nizhny Novgorod: 5 pts, Rostov: 4 pts.)	
12	Volga Nizhny Novgorod	30	7	8	15	28	46	−18	29	
13	Rostov (O)	30	7	8	15	30	41	−11	29	Qualification for the Relegation play-offs
14	Krylia Sovetov Samara (O)	30	7	7	16	31	52	−21	28	Qualification for the Relegation play-offs

Source: Russian Premier League
Rules for classification: 1) points; 2) number of wins; 3) head-to-head points; 4) number of head-to-head wins; 5) head-to-head goal difference; 6) number of head-to-head goals scored; 7) number of head-to-head away goals scored; 8) goal difference; 9) number of goals scored; 10) number of away goals scored; 11) position in the 2011–12 season (only used until all the regularly scheduled games have been played); 11) extra play-off game or tournament between the teams in question.
(O) Play-off winners

=== Russian Cup ===
26 September 2012 Round of 32	FC Khimki	2 – 0	Volga Nizhny Novgorod	Arena Khimki
19:00 MSK (UTC+4)	Komkov 61'; Romaschenko 84'	Summary		Attendance: 750; Referee: Eduard Malyi

== Squad statistics ==
=== Appearances and goals ===
No.	Pos	Nat	Player	Total		Premier League		Russian Cup	
No.	Pos	Nat	Player	Apps	Goals	Apps	Goals	Apps	Goals
2	DF	(Kyrgyzstan) KGZ	Valerii Kichin	3	0	3+0	0	0+0	0
3	DF	(Moldova) MDA	Simeon Bulgaru	7	0	6+1	0	0+0	0
4	DF	(Russia) RUS	Dmitri Aydov	16	0	15+0	0	1+0	0
5	MF	(Russia) RUS	Andrei Karyaka	27	2	23+3	2	0+1	0
6	DF	(Russia) RUS	Dmitriy Polyanin	18	0	18+0	0	0+0	0
8	DF	(Georgia (country)) GEO	Gia Grigalava	20	1	19+0	1	1+0	0
9	MF	(Russia) RUS	Aleksandr Shulenin	17	2	15+1	2	1+0	0
10	MF	(Netherlands) NED	Romeo Castelen	2	0	0+2	0	0+0	0
11	FW	(Russia) RUS	Shamil Asildarov	14	3	6+7	3	1+0	0
13	MF	(Russia) RUS	Dmitri Kudryashov	20	0	15+5	0	0+0	0
14	FW	(Armenia) ARM	Artur Sarkisov	19	3	10+8	3	0+1	0
16	MF	(Belarus) BLR	Anton Putsila	11	0	10+1	0	0+0	0
17	MF	(Croatia) CRO	Matija Dvornekovic	10	0	5+5	0	0+0	0
19	MF	(Romania) ROU	Adrian Ropotan	6	0	6+0	0	0+0	0
21	MF	(Russia) RUS	Ruslan Adzhindzhal	30	0	28+1	0	1+0	0
23	MF	(Romania) ROU	Mihăiță Pleșan	9	0	6+3	0	0+0	0
25	DF	(Russia) RUS	Andrei Buivolov	8	0	7+1	0	0+0	0
26	DF	(Poland) POL	Piotr Polczak	5	0	5+0	0	0+0	0
27	FW	(Russia) RUS	Aleksei Sapogov	23	8	20+2	8	1+0	0
29	MF	(Russia) RUS	Shota Bibilov	22	1	12+9	1	1+0	0
31	GK	(Russia) RUS	Ilya Abayev	11	0	11+0	0	0+0	0
33	DF	(Russia) RUS	Nikolai Zaytsev	18	0	11+6	0	1+0	0
37	DF	(Moldova) MDA	Vitalie Bordian	9	0	9+0	0	0+0	0
41	GK	(Russia) RUS	Mikhail Kerzhakov	20	0	19+0	0	1+0	0
63	DF	(Russia) RUS	Aleksandr Belozyorov	29	2	25+3	2	1+0	0
77	FW	(Russia) RUS	Aleksandr Salugin	17	1	7+9	1	0+1	0
83	MF	(Russia) RUS	Aleksandr Kharitonov	21	1	13+8	1	0+0	0
Players away from the club on loan:
Players who appeared for Volga Nizhny Novgorod who left the club:
19	MF	(Serbia) SRB	Mersudin Ahmetović	6	0	3+3	0	0+0	0
87	MF	(Russia) RUS	Ilya Maksimov	14	4	13+0	4	1+0	0

=== Top scorers ===
Place	Position	Nation	Number	Name	Premier League	Russian Cup	Total
1	FW	(Russia)	27	Aleksei Sapogov	8	0	8
2	MF	(Russia)	87	Ilya Maksimov	4	0	4
3	FW	(Russia)	11	Shamil Asildarov	3	0	3
3	FW	(Armenia)	14	Artur Sarkisov	3	0	3
5	MF	(Russia)	9	Aleksandr Shulenin	2	0	2
5	DF	(Russia)	63	Aleksandr Belozyorov	2	0	2
5	MF	(Russia)	5	Andrei Karyaka	2	0	2
8	MF	(Russia)	83	Aleksandr Kharitonov	1	0	1
8	DF	(Georgia (country))	8	Gia Grigalava	1	0	1
8	MF	(Russia)	29	Shota Bibilov	1	0	1
8	FW	(Russia)	77	Aleksandr Salugin	1	0	1
				TOTALS	28	0	28

=== Disciplinary record ===
Number	Nation	Position	Name	Premier League		Russian Cup		Total	
Number	Nation	Position	Name	Yellow card	Red card	Yellow card	Red card	Yellow card	Red card
5	(Russia)	MF	Andrei Karyaka	0	0	1	0	1	0
9	(Russia)	MF	Aleksandr Shulenin	0	0	1	0	1	0
11	(Russia)	FW	Shamil Asildarov	0	0	1	0	1	0
29	(Russia)	MF	Shota Bibilov	0	0	0	1	0	1
33	(Russia)	DF	Nikolai Zaytsev	0	0	1	0	1	0
			TOTALS	0	0	4	1	4	1
