= Bibilov =

Bibilov (Ossetian: Бибылты; Russian: Бибилов) is an Ossetian masculine surname; its feminine counterpart is Bibilova. Notable people with the surname include:

- Anatoliy Bibilov (born 1970), Russian and South Ossetian military officer
- Shota Bibilov (born 1990), Russian footballer of Ossetian descent
