= Mikhail Kerzhakov =

Russian footballer (born 1987)

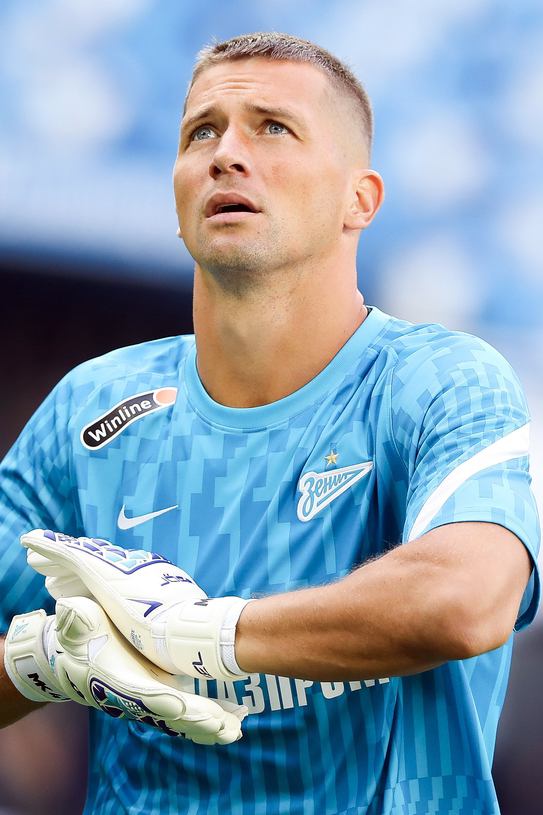
- Kerzhakov with Zenit in 2021

Personal information
- Full name: Mikhail Anatolyevich Kerzhakov
- Date of birth: 28 January 1987 (age 39)
- Place of birth: Kingisepp, Russian SFSR, Soviet Union
- Height: 1.91 m (6 ft 3 in)
- Position: Goalkeeper

Team information
- Current team: Zenit St. Petersburg (GK coach)

Youth career
- 2004-2008: Zenit Saint Petersburg

Senior career*
Years	Team	Apps	(Gls)
2005–2010	Zenit Saint Petersburg	0	(0)
2008	→ Volga Ulyanovsk (loan)	21	(0)
2009	→ Volgar (loan)	17	(0)
2010	→ Alania Vladikavkaz (loan)	16	(0)
2011–2013	Volga Nizhny Novgorod	31	(0)
2013–2015	Anzhi Makhachkala	55	(0)
2015–2026	Zenit Saint Petersburg	101	(0)
2015	→ Zenit-2 St. Petersburg	1	(0)
2017	→ Orenburg (loan)	5	(0)
2018	→ Zenit-2 St. Petersburg	13	(0)

International career
2005	Russia U-19	4	(0)
2007–2008	Russia U-21	3	(0)

Managerial career
- 2026–: Zenit St. Petersburg (GK coach)
- * Club domestic league appearances and goals

Mikhail Anatolyevich Kerzhakov (Russian: Михаил Анатольевич Кержаков; born 28 January 1987) is a Russian professional football coach and a former goalkeeper. He is a goalkeeping coach with Zenit St. Petersburg.

== Club career ==
=== Zenit Saint Petersburg ===
==== 2016–17: Loan to Orenburg ====
On 10 February 2017, he joined Orenburg on loan until the end of the 2016–17 season.

==== 2022–25: Contract extensions ====
On 15 June 2022, Kerzhakov extended his contract with Zenit Saint Petersburg for the 2022–23 season. On 3 June 2023, he extended it for the 2023–24 season. On 3 June 2024, Kerzhakov extended his contract for the 2024–25 season. On 17 June 2025, he extended his contract for the 2025–26 season.

== International career ==
Kerzhakov was called up to the Russia national football team for the first time for a friendly against Kyrgyzstan in September 2022.

== Personal life ==
He is the younger brother of striker Aleksandr Kerzhakov.

== Career statistics ==
As of match played 25 May 2024

Appearances and goals by club, season and competition
Club	Season	League			Cup		Continental		Other		Total	
Club	Season	Division	Apps	Goals	Apps	Goals	Apps	Goals	Apps	Goals	Apps	Goals
Zenit Saint Petersburg	2005	Russian Premier League	0	0	0	0	0	0	–		0	0
Zenit Saint Petersburg	2006	Russian Premier League	0	0	0	0	0	0	–		0	0
Zenit Saint Petersburg	2007	Russian Premier League	0	0	0	0	0	0	–		0	0
Zenit Saint Petersburg	2008	Russian Premier League	0	0	0	0	0	0	–		0	0
Zenit Saint Petersburg	Total		0	0	0	0	0	0	0	0	0	0
Volga Ulyanovsk (loan)	2008	Russian First Division	21	0	0	0	–		–		21	0
Volgar (loan)	2009	Russian First Division	17	0	1	0	–		–		18	0
Alania Vladikavkaz (loan)	2010	Russian Premier League	16	0	2	0	–		–		18	0
Volga NN	2011–12	Russian Premier League	12	0	1	0	–		2 (Note: Two appearances in relegation play-offs)	0	15	0
Volga NN	2012–13	Russian Premier League	19	0	1	0	–		–		20	0
Volga NN	Total		31	0	2	0	0	0	2	0	35	0
Anzhi Makhachkala	2013–14	Russian Premier League	23	0	0	0	7	0	–		30	0
Anzhi Makhachkala	2014–15	Russian First Division	32	0	2	0	–		–		34	0
Anzhi Makhachkala	Total		55	0	2	0	7	0	0	0	64	0
Zenit Saint Petersburg	2015–16	Russian Premier League	3	0	3	0	2	0	0	0	8	0
Zenit Saint Petersburg	2016–17	Russian Premier League	6	0	1	0	1	0	0	0	8	0
Zenit Saint Petersburg	2017–18	Russian Premier League	0	0	0	0	0	0	–		0	0
Zenit Saint Petersburg	2018–19	Russian Premier League	1	0	1	0	2	0	–		4	0
Zenit Saint Petersburg	2019–20	Russian Premier League	10	0	4	0	4	0	0	0	18	0
Zenit Saint Petersburg	2020–21	Russian Premier League	18	0	0	0	6	0	1 (Note: Appearance(s) in Russian Super Cup.)	0	25	0
Zenit Saint Petersburg	2021–22	Russian Premier League	19	0	2	0	3	0	1	0	25	0
Zenit Saint Petersburg	2022–23	Russian Premier League	24	0	2	0	–		0	0	26	0
Zenit Saint Petersburg	2023–24	Russian Premier League	20	0	2	0	–		1	0	23	0
Zenit Saint Petersburg	Total		101	0	15	0	18	0	3	0	137	0
Zenit-2	2015–16	Russian First Division	1	0	–		–		–		1	0
Zenit-2	2017–18	Russian First Division	13	0	–		–		–		13	0
Zenit-2	Total		14	0	0	0	0	0	0	0	14	0
Orenburg (loan)	2016–17	Russian Premier League	5	0	–		–		–		5	0
Career total			260	0	22	0	25	0	5	0	312	0

== Honours ==
Zenit Saint Petersburg

- Russian Premier League: 2007, 2018–19, 2019–20, 2020–21, 2021–22, 2022–23, 2023–24, 2025–26
- Russian Cup: 2015–16, 2019–20, 2023–24
- Russian Super Cup: 2015, 2016, 2020, 2021, 2022, 2023, 2024
