= Budanov =

Budanov (Russian: Буданов) is a Russian masculine surname, its feminine counterpart is Budanova. It may refer to:

- Abram Budanov (1886–1929), Ukrainian anarchist military commander
- Aleksandr Budanov (born 1991), Russian football player
- Kyrylo Budanov (born 1986), Ukrainian army major general and former chief of the Main Intelligence Directorate
- Yekaterina Budanova (1916–1943), Soviet fighter pilot
- Yuri Budanov (1963–2011), Russian military officer, convicted of crimes in Chechnya

== See also ==
- Budaniv
