= Oleg Smirnov (footballer, born 1990) =

Russian footballer (born 1990)

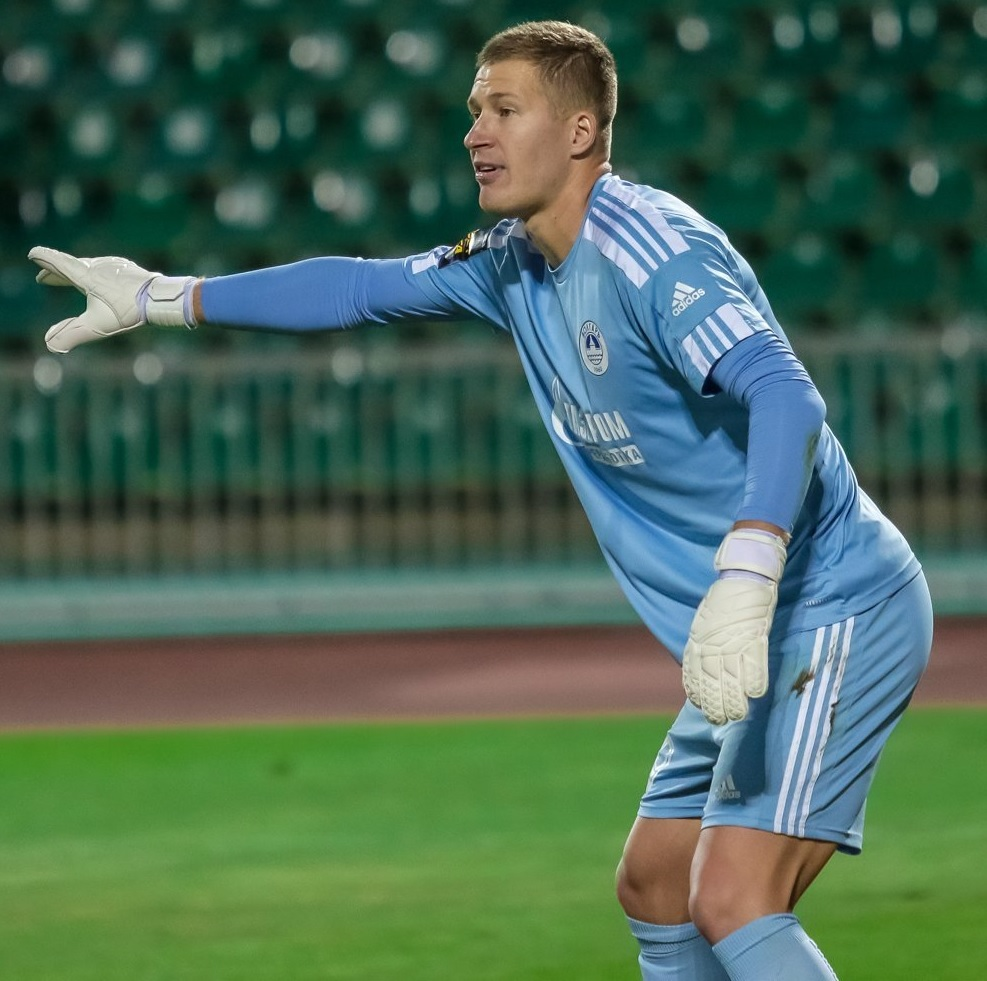
- Smirnov with Volgar Astrakhan in 2022

Personal information
- Full name: Oleg Valeryevich Smirnov
- Date of birth: 1 October 1990 (age 36)
- Place of birth: Shakhunya, Russian SFSR
- Height: 1.94 m (6 ft 4 in)
- Position: Goalkeeper

Senior career*
Years	Team	Apps	(Gls)
2008–2010	FC Volga Nizhny Novgorod	0	(0)
2010	→ FC Khimik Dzerzhinsk (loan)	1	(0)
2011	FC Kaluga	1	(0)
2011	FC Nizhny Novgorod	0	(0)
2011–2012	FC Khimik Dzerzhinsk	5	(0)
2013–2014	FC Sever Murmansk	26	(0)
2014–2015	FC Volga Tver	24	(0)
2015–2019	FC Tambov	62	(0)
2019	→ FC Tom Tomsk (loan)	12	(0)
2019	FC Mordovia Saransk	15	(0)
2020–2021	FC Nizhny Novgorod	11	(0)
2021–2025	FC Volgar Astrakhan	88	(0)
2025	FC Volna Nizhny Novgorod Oblast	7	(0)
- * Club domestic league appearances and goals as of 19 October 2025

Oleg Valeryevich Smirnov (Russian: Олег Валерьевич Смирнов; born 1 October 1990) is a Russian professional football player.

== Club career ==
He made his Russian Football National League debut for FC Tambov on 11 July 2016 in a game against FC SKA-Khabarovsk.
