= Rinat Mavletdinov =

Russian footballer

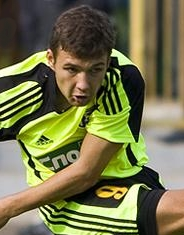
- Rinat Mavlentdinov in 2008

Personal information
- Full name: Rinat Takhirovich Mavletdinov
- Date of birth: 9 September 1988 (age 38)
- Place of birth: Moscow, Russian SFSR
- Height: 1.75 m (5 ft 9 in)
- Position: Midfielder

Senior career*
Years	Team	Apps	(Gls)
2005–2009	FC Sportakademklub Moscow	92	(12)
2009	→ FC Nizhny Novgorod (loan)	27	(0)
2010–2012	FC Volga Nizhny Novgorod	0	(0)
2010	→ FC Nizhny Novgorod (loan)	22	(0)
2011–2012	→ FC Khimki (loan)	20	(1)
2012	FC Fakel Voronezh	5	(0)
2013	FC Mashuk-KMV Pyatigorsk	12	(1)
2013–2014	FC Luch-Energiya Vladivostok	17	(1)
2014–2015	FC Saturn Ramenskoye	10	(0)
2015	FC Fakel Voronezh	0	(0)
- * Club domestic league appearances and goals

Rinat Takhirovich Mavletdinov (Russian: Ринат Тахирович Мавлетдинов; born 9 September 1988) is a former Russian professional football player.

== Club career ==
He played 5 seasons in the Russian Football National League for 4 different clubs.
