= Leilton =

Brazilian footballer

Leílton
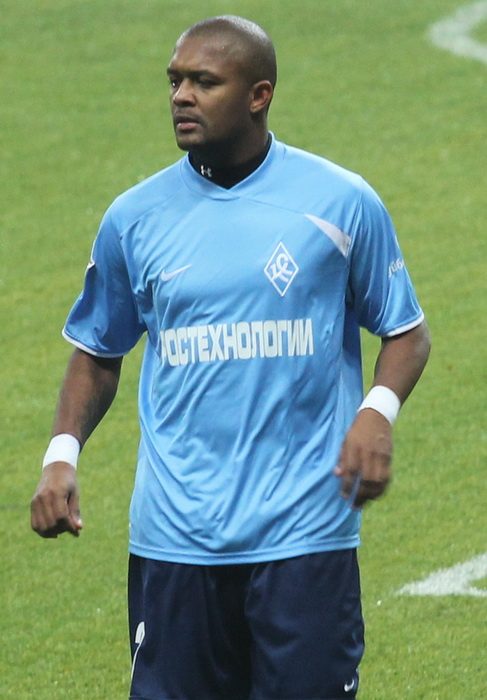

Personal information
- Full name: Leílton Silva dos Santos
- Date of birth: 7 March 1982 (age 44)
- Place of birth: Itabuna, Brazil
- Height: 1.78 m (5 ft 10 in)
- Position: Defender

Senior career*
Years	Team	Apps	(Gls)
2000–2002	Vitória	8	(0)
2003–2010	FC Krylia Sovetov Samara	132	(5)
2006	→ FC Shinnik Yaroslavl (loan)	7	(1)
2011	FC Volga Nizhny Novgorod	4	(0)
2012	Volta Redonda		
2013	Ypiranga		
- * Club domestic league appearances and goals

Leílton Silva dos Santos usually known as Leilton (born 7 March 1982) is a Brazilian former footballer.

== Club career ==
Leílton previously played for Esporte Clube Vitória in the Campeonato Brasileiro.

Leilton started his footballing career in Brazil, but soon moved to Russia, joining FC Krylia Sovetov Samara. It was here that Leilton enjoyed the most successful period of his career, representing the team over a hundred times during a seven-year period which saw him score five goals.
