= Gia Grigalava =

Georgian footballer

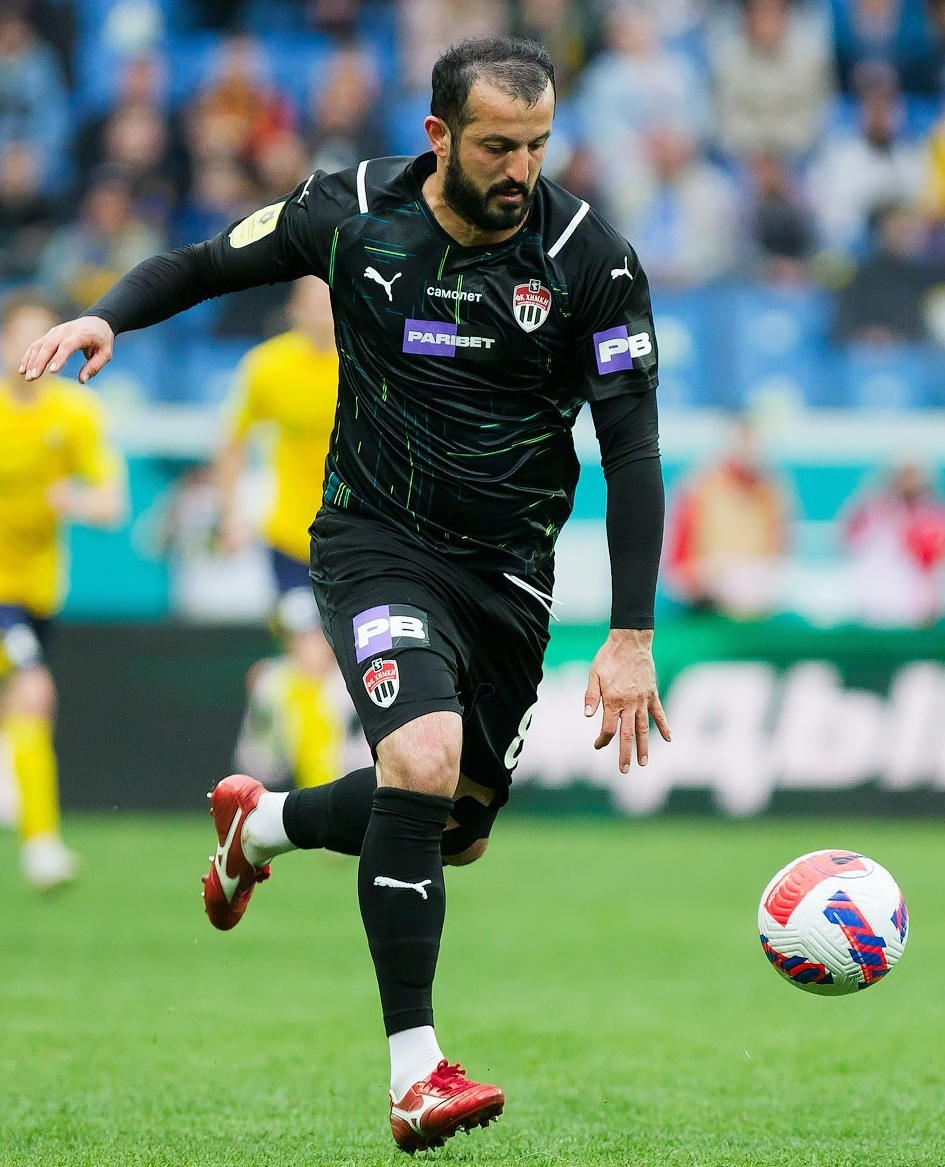
- Grigalava with Khimki in 2022

Personal information
- Date of birth: 5 August 1989 (age 37)
- Place of birth: Kutaisi, Georgian SSR, Soviet Union
- Height: 1.90 m (6 ft 3 in)
- Position: Centre-back

Youth career
- 2004–2006: Rostov

Senior career*
Years	Team	Apps	(Gls)
2007	Rostov	1	(0)
2008–2010	SKA Rostov-on-Don	25	(2)
2009	→ FC Moscow (loan)	14	(0)
2010	→ Rostov (loan)	9	(0)
2011–2013	Volga Nizhny Novgorod	50	(1)
2013	Krylia Sovetov Samara	5	(0)
2013–2015	Anzhi Makhachkala	22	(1)
2015	Pafos	16	(1)
2016	Ethnikos Achna	9	(0)
2017–2021	Arsenal Tula	81	(3)
2022	Khimki	9	(0)
2022–2023	Arsenal Tula	28	(1)

International career
2009	Russia U-21	1	(0)
2011–2020	Georgia	34	(0)
- * Club domestic league appearances and goals

Gia Aleksandrovich Grigalava (Georgian: გია გრიგალავა, romanized: gia grigalava, pronounced [ɡia ɡɾiɡalava]; Russian: Гиа Александрович Григалава; born 5 August 1989) is a Georgian former professional footballer. He also holds Russian citizenship.

== Career ==
The Russian-Georgian started his career at FC Rostov, who made his debut in the Russian Premier League in 2007. In January 2010 SKA Rostov loaned the left-back to FC Rostov for one season and returns after six years to his youth club. Since April 2009 and until December 2009 he was on loan at FC Moscow.

In February 2015, Grigalava tested positive for banned substances. On the 12th of the same month, Grigalava was released by Anzhi.

== International career ==
Grigalava was a part of the Russia U-21 side that was competing in the 2011 European Under-21 Championship qualification.

== Career statistics ==
As of 28 May 2022

Club	Season	League			Cup		Continental		Other		Total	
Club	Season	Division	Apps	Goals	Apps	Goals	Apps	Goals	Apps	Goals	Apps	Goals
Rostov	2006	RPL	0	0	1	0	–		–		1	0
Rostov	2007	RPL	1	0	2	0	–		–		3	0
SKA Rostov-on-Don	2008	FNL	25	2	3	1	–		–		28	3
Moscow	2009	RPL	14	0	4	0	–		–		18	0
Rostov	2010	RPL	9	0	2	0	–		–		11	0
Rostov	Total		10	0	5	0	0	0	0	0	15	0
Volga Nizhny Novgorod	2011–12	RPL	31	0	4	0	–		2 (Note: Appearances in relegation play-offs)	0	37	0
Volga Nizhny Novgorod	2012–13	RPL	19	1	1	0	–		–		20	1
Volga Nizhny Novgorod	Total		50	1	5	0	0	0	2	0	57	1
Krylia Sovetov Samara	2013–14	RPL	5	0	–		–		–		5	0
Anzhi Makhachkala	2013–14	RPL	22	1	–		7 (Note: Appearances in the UEFA Europa League)	0	–		29	1
Anzhi Makhachkala	2014–15	FNL	0	0	0	0	–		–		0	0
Anzhi Makhachkala	Total		22	1	0	0	7	0	0	0	29	1
Pafos	2015–16	Cypriot First Division	16	1	–		–		–		16	1
Ethnikos Achna	2016–17	Cypriot First Division	9	0	–		–		–		9	0
Arsenal Tula	2016–17	RPL	4	1	–		–		2	0	6	1
Arsenal Tula	2017–18	RPL	11	0	0	0	–		–		11	0
Arsenal Tula	2018–19	RPL	26	1	4	1	–		–		30	2
Arsenal Tula	2019–20	RPL	22	1	1	0	2	0	–		25	1
Arsenal Tula	2020–21	RPL	18	0	3	0	–		–		21	0
Arsenal Tula	Total		81	3	8	1	2	0	2	0	93	4
Khimki	2021–22	RPL	9	0	–		–		1	0	10	0
Career total			241	8	25	2	9	0	5	0	280	10
