= Dmitri Polyanin =

Russian footballer and coach

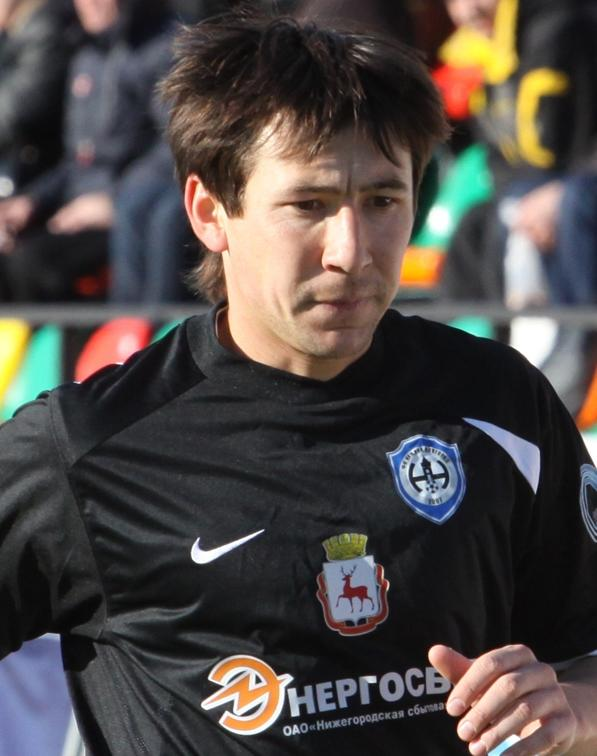
- With Nizhny Novgorod in 2012

Personal information
- Full name: Dmitri Borisovich Polyanin
- Date of birth: 30 March 1980 (age 46)
- Place of birth: Perm, Russian SFSR
- Height: 1.76 m (5 ft 9 1/2 in)
- Position: Midfielder

Team information
- Current team: FC KAMAZ Naberezhnye Chelny (fitness coach)

Senior career*
Years	Team	Apps	(Gls)
1998	FC Amkar Perm	9	(0)
1999–2002	FC Dynamo Perm	93	(13)
2003–2006	FC KAMAZ Naberezhnye Chelny	114	(3)
2007–2016	FC Volga Nizhny Novgorod	202	(6)
2011–2012	→ FC Nizhny Novgorod (loan)	43	(0)
2016–2018	FC Olimpiyets Nizhny Novgorod	17	(0)

Managerial career
- 2018–2025: FC Pari Nizhny Novgorod (fitness coach)
- 2025–: FC KAMAZ Naberezhnye Chelny (fitness coach)
- * Club domestic league appearances and goals

Dmitri Borisovich Polyanin (Russian: Дмитрий Борисович Полянин; born 30 March 1980) is a Russian professional football coach and a former player. He works as a fitness coach with FC KAMAZ Naberezhnye Chelny.
