= Maksim Zyuzin =

Russian footballer

Personal information
- Full name: Maksim Anatolyevich Zyuzin
- Date of birth: 9 August 1986 (age 40)
- Place of birth: Irkutsk, Russian SFSR
- Height: 1.75 m (5 ft 9 in)
- Positions: Midfielder; defender

Senior career*
Years	Team	Apps	(Gls)
2002–2005	FC Zvezda Irkutsk	56	(0)
2005	FC Khimki	0	(0)
2006	FC Presnya Moscow	7	(0)
2006–2007	FC Spartak-MZhK Ryazan	39	(2)
2007	FC Zvezda Irkutsk	13	(0)
2008–2010	FC Nizhny Novgorod	93	(8)
2011–2012	FC Volga Nizhny Novgorod	6	(0)
2011	→ FC Sibir Novosibirsk (loan)	14	(0)
2012–2014	FC SKA-Energiya Khabarovsk	19	(1)
2014	FC Khimki	13	(3)
2015	FC Luch-Energiya Vladivostok	25	(1)
2016	FC Neftekhimik Nizhnekamsk	8	(0)
2016–2017	FC Domodedovo Moscow	15	(2)
2017–2018	FC Mordovia Saransk	15	(0)
2018–2019	PFC Dynamo Stavropol	22	(2)
2019–2020	FC Olimp Khimki	15	(0)
2020	PFC Dynamo Stavropol	11	(0)
- * Club domestic league appearances and goals

Maksim Anatolyevich Zyuzin (Russian: Максим Анатольевич Зюзин; born 9 August 1986) is a Russian former professional football player.

== Club career ==
He made his Russian Premier League debut for FC Volga Nizhny Novgorod on 14 March 2011 in a game against FC Tom Tomsk.
