= Miklós Gaál =

Hungarian footballer (born 1981)

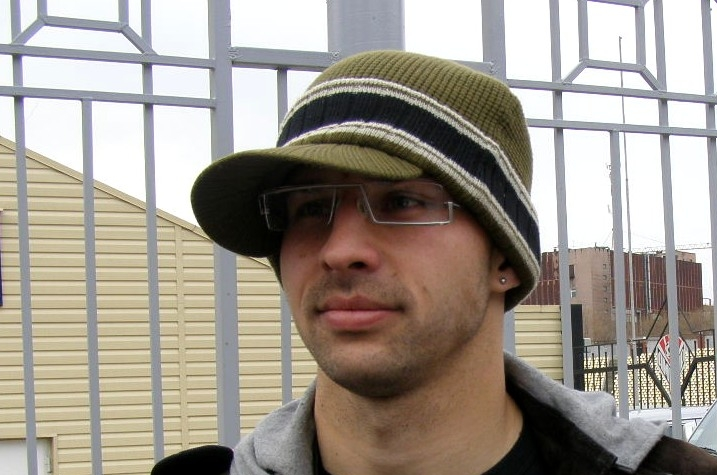
- Miklós Gaál in FC Amkar

Personal information
- Date of birth: 13 May 1981 (age 45)
- Place of birth: Celldömölk, Hungary
- Height: 1.82 m (5 ft 11 1/2 in)
- Position: Left back

Youth career
- Szombathelyi Haladás

Senior career*
Years	Team	Apps	(Gls)
2000	Pécsi MFC	8	(0)
2001–2003	Szombathelyi Haladás		
2003–2004	Pécsi MFC	21	(0)
2004–2005	Újpest FC	5	(0)
2005	Zalaegerszeg	11	(0)
2005	Pécsi MFC	3	(0)
2005–2006	Marítimo	3	(0)
2006–2007	Hajduk Split	9	(0)
2007–2010	Amkar Perm	62	(0)
2011–2012	Volga NN	6	(0)
2012	Slavia Sofia	3	(0)
2013	Pécsi MFC	9	(0)
2014	Kozármisleny		

International career
1998–1999	Hungary U-18	6	(0)
1999–2000	Hungary U-20	1	(0)
- * Club domestic league appearances and goals

Miklós Gaál (born 13 May 1981) is a Hungarian former footballer.

Previous clubs: Keszthely, Szombathelyi Haladás, Pécsi MFC, Újpest FC, Zalaegerszegi TE, Maritimo, Hajduk Split, Amkar Perm.
