= Sergei Bendz =

Russian footballer

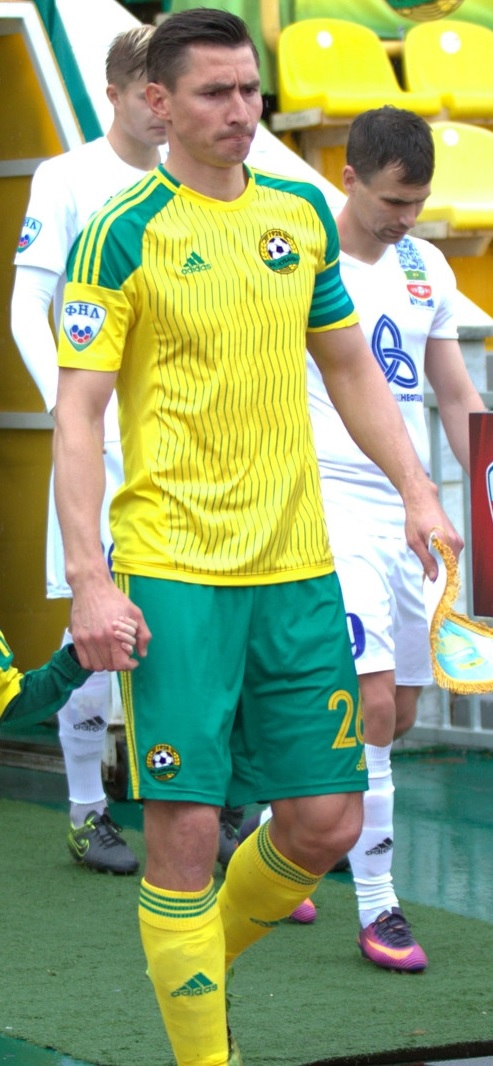
- Bendz with Kuban in 2017

Personal information
- Full name: Sergei Aleksandrovich Bendz
- Date of birth: 3 April 1983 (age 43)
- Place of birth: Krasnodar, Soviet Union
- Height: 1.92 m (6 ft 3 1/2 in)
- Position: Defender

Senior career*
Years	Team	Apps	(Gls)
2003–2008	FC Rostov	56	(1)
2008–2009	FC Terek Grozny	20	(3)
2010	FC Nizhny Novgorod	33	(2)
2011	FC Volga Nizhny Novgorod	15	(1)
2011–2013	FC Kuban Krasnodar	3	(0)
2012	→ FC Volga Nizhny Novgorod (loan)	11	(1)
2012–2013	→ FC Tom Tomsk (loan)	25	(3)
2014	FC Luch-Energiya Vladivostok	9	(0)
2014–2016	FC Tom Tomsk	60	(3)
2016–2018	FC Kuban Krasnodar	46	(1)
2018–2019	FC Urozhay Krasnodar	24	(1)
2019–2020	FC SKA Rostov-on-Don	22	(1)

International career
2004	Russia U-21	6	(0)
2011	Russia-2	1	(0)
- * Club domestic league appearances and goals

Sergei Aleksandrovich Bendz (Russian: Серге́й Александрович Бендзь; born 3 April 1983) is a Russian former footballer.

== Club career ==
He made his Russian Premier League debut for FC Rostov on 5 October 2003 in a game against FC Uralan Elista.
