= Nikola Kirilov Georgiyev =

Russian footballer

Nikola Georgiyev
Personal information
- Full name: Nikola Kirilov Georgiyev
- Date of birth: 16 December 1982 (age 43)
- Place of birth: Stary Oskol, Russian SFSR
- Height: 1.78 m (5 ft 10 in)
- Position: Forward

Senior career*
Years	Team	Apps	(Gls)
1999–2000	FC Elektronika Nizhny Novgorod (amateur)		
2001–2002	FC Elektronika Nizhny Novgorod	52	(13)
2002	FC Uralan Elista	0	(0)
2003–2004	FC Elektronika Nizhny Novgorod	49	(18)
2004	FC Zhenis	7	(1)
2005–2006	FC Volga Nizhny Novgorod	43	(8)
2006	FC Volga Tver	12	(1)
2007	FC Sever Murmansk (amateur)		
2008–2009	FC Sever Murmansk	61	(10)
2010	FC Sokol Sokolskoye		
- * Club domestic league appearances and goals

Nikola Kirilov Georgiyev (Russian: Никола Кирилов Георгиев; born 16 December 1982) is a former Russian professional football player.

== Club career ==
He played in the Kazakhstan Premier League for FC Zhenis in 2004.
