= Yevgeni Degtyaryov =

Russian footballer

Personal information
- Full name: Yevgeni Anatolyevich Degtyaryov
- Date of birth: 7 February 1993 (age 33)
- Place of birth: Kuznetsk, Russia
- Height: 1.72 m (5 ft 8 in)
- Position: Midfielder

Youth career
- UOR Master-Saturn Yegoryevsk

Senior career*
Years	Team	Apps	(Gls)
2010	FC Saturn Ramenskoye	0	(0)
2010	→ FC Saturn-2 Moscow Region	10	(0)
2011–2014	FC Volga Nizhny Novgorod	0	(0)
2014	FC Terek-2 Grozny	11	(0)
2014–2015	FC Saturn Ramenskoye	14	(0)
2015–2016	FC Terek Grozny	0	(0)
2015–2016	→ FC Terek-2 Grozny	24	(5)
2016–2019	FC Saturn Ramenskoye	38	(2)
2019–2020	FC Ryazan	15	(1)
2020	FC Chayka Peschanokopskoye	11	(1)
2020–2021	FC Ryazan	20	(5)
2021–2023	FC Salyut Belgorod	57	(5)
- * Club domestic league appearances and goals

Yevgeni Anatolyevich Degtyaryov (Russian: Евгений Анатольевич Дегтярёв; born 7 February 1993) is a Russian former football player.

== Club career ==
He made his debut in the Russian Football National League for FC Chayka Peschanokopskoye on 1 August 2020 in a game against FC Neftekhimik Nizhnekamsk, as a starter.
