= Sergei Osadchuk =

Russian footballer and manager

Personal information
- Full name: Sergei Ivanovich Osadchuk
- Date of birth: 18 October 1982 (age 44)
- Place of birth: Shevchenko, now Aktau, Kazakh SSR
- Height: 1.66 m (5 ft 5 in)
- Position: Midfielder

Senior career*
Years	Team	Apps	(Gls)
2002	FC Spartak Lukhovitsy	37	(0)
2003	FC Pskov-2000	23	(4)
2004	FC Ural Yekaterinburg	31	(0)
2005–2006	FC SOYUZ-Gazprom Izhevsk	52	(6)
2007–2008	FC Lukhovitsy	38	(3)
2008–2010	FC Volga Nizhny Novgorod	35	(4)
2010	→ FC Chernomorets Novorossiysk (loan)	20	(1)
2011–2012	FC Ufa	44	(1)
2013	FC Tekstilshchik Ivanovo	25	(2)
2014	FC Pskov-747	7	(0)
2014–2015	FC Volga Ulyanovsk	16	(1)

Managerial career
- 2017–2021: FC Luki-Energiya Velikiye Luki
- 2021: FC Luki-Energiya Velikiye Luki (assistant)
- 2021–2025: FC Luki-Energiya Velikiye Luki
- * Club domestic league appearances and goals

Sergei Ivanovich Osadchuk (Russian: Серге́й Иванович Осадчук; born 18 October 1982) is a Russian professional football manager and a former player.

== Club career ==
He played two seasons in the Russian Football National League for FC Volga Nizhny Novgorod and FC Ufa.
