= Maksim Burchenko =

Russian footballer

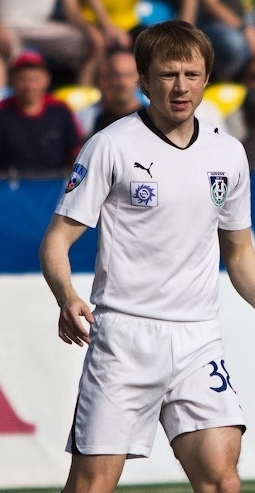

Personal information
- Full name: Maksim Gennadyevich Burchenko
- Date of birth: 21 January 1983 (age 43)
- Place of birth: Stary Oskol, Russian SFSR
- Height: 1.72 m (5 ft 8 in)
- Position: Midfielder

Team information
- Current team: FC Rostov-2 (assistant coach)

Youth career
- –2001: FC Metallurg Lipetsk

Senior career*
Years	Team	Apps	(Gls)
2001	FC Metallurg Lipetsk	0	(0)
2002–2004	FC Uralan Elista	25	(1)
2004–2007	FC Rostov	57	(2)
2008–2009	FC Shinnik Yaroslavl	46	(1)
2010	FC Luch-Energiya Vladivostok	36	(6)
2011–2012	FC Volga Nizhny Novgorod	5	(0)
2011–2012	→ FC Shinnik Yaroslavl (loan)	20	(2)
2013	FC Shinnik Yaroslavl	11	(0)
2013–2014	FC Torpedo Moscow	11	(1)
2014–2015	FC Luch-Energiya Vladivostok	28	(2)
2015–2016	FC Sokol Saratov	30	(0)
2016–2017	FC Energomash Belgorod	34	(4)

International career
2004–2005	Russia U-21	5	(0)

Managerial career
- 2022–2024: FC Rostov (U19 assistant)
- 2024–: FC Rostov-2 (assistant)
- * Club domestic league appearances and goals

Maksim Gennadyevich Burchenko (Russian: Максим Геннадьевич Бурченко; born 21 January 1983) is a Russian football coach and a former player. He is an assistant coach with FC Rostov-2.
