= Aleksandr Belozyorov =

Russian footballer

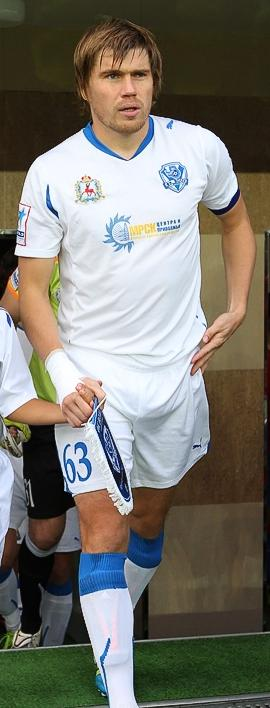
- With Volga NN in 2011

Personal information
- Full name: Aleksandr Nikolayevich Belozyorov
- Date of birth: October 27, 1981 (age 44)
- Place of birth: Tolyatti, Soviet Union
- Height: 1.84 m (6 ft 0 in)
- Position: Defender

Team information
- Current team: FS «Galaxy» Tolyatti

Senior career*
| Years | Team | Apps | (Gls) |
| 1999–2000 | FC Lada Tolyatti | 39 | (0) |
| 2000 | FC Spartak-2 Moscow | 8 | (0) |
| 2001–2003 | FC Lada Tolyatti | 62 | (7) |
| 2003 | FC Spartak Moscow | 7 | (1) |
| 2004 | FC Chernomorets Novorossiysk | 18 | (6) |
| 2004 | FC Lisma-Mordovia Saransk | 20 | (1) |
| 2005–2007 | FC KAMAZ Naberezhnye Chelny | 105 | (24) |
| 2008–2010 | FC Krylia Sovetov Samara | 70 | (2) |
| 2011–2013 | FC Volga Nizhny Novgorod | 55 | (3) |
| 2013–2015 | FC Ural Sverdlovsk Oblast | 25 | (1) |
| 2016–2017 | FC Lada-Tolyatti | 7 | (0) |
| 2018 | FC Akron Tolyatti (amateur) | | |

International career
| 2002–2003 | Russia U-21 | 5 | (1) |

Managerial career
- 2015–: FS «Galaxy» Tolyatti
- * Club domestic league appearances and goals as of 4 June 2017

Aleksandr Nikolayevich Belozyorov (Russian: Александр Николаевич Белозёров; born 27 October 1981) is a former Russian footballer who played as a centre-back.
