= Petar Jelić =

Bosnian Serb footballer (born 1986)

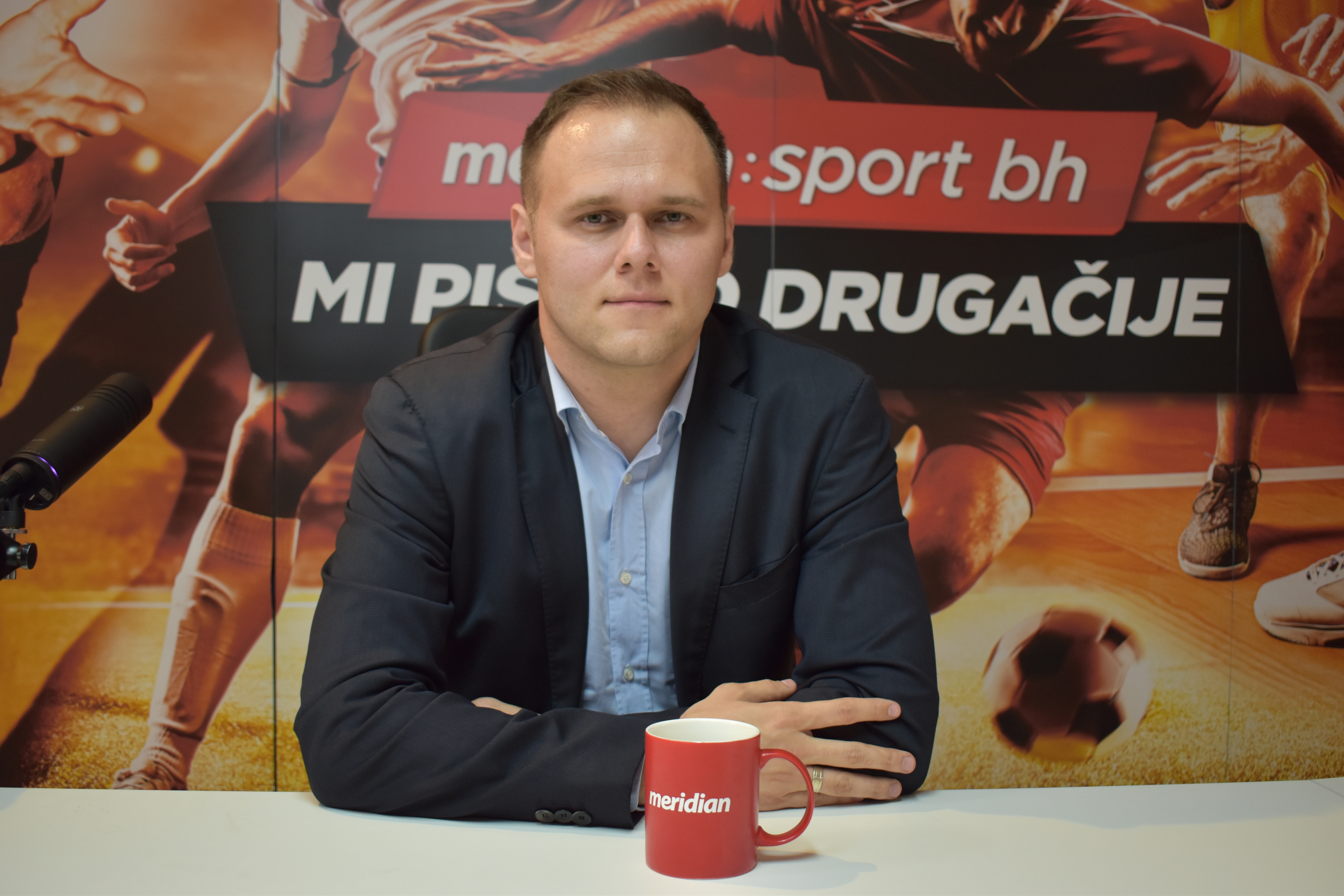
- Jelić in 2021

Personal information
- Date of birth: 18 October 1986 (age 40)
- Place of birth: Modriča, SFR Yugoslavia
- Height: 1.87 m (6 ft 2 in)
- Position: Striker

Youth career
- 1994–2002: Modriča Maxima

Senior career*
Years	Team	Apps	(Gls)
2003–2006	Modriča Maxima	79	(29)
2006–2007	1. FC Nürnberg	0	(0)
2006	→ Carl Zeiss Jena (loan)	1	(0)
2007–2010	OFK Beograd	38	(6)
2010–2012	Volga Nizhny Novgorod	16	(3)
2011	→ Dinamo Tbilisi (loan)	6	(2)
2013	Novi Pazar	8	(1)
2014	Guangdong Sunray Cave	12	(3)
2014–2015	Rad	23	(8)

International career
2004–2008	Bosnia and Herzegovina U21		
2006	Bosnia and Herzegovina	2	(0)
- * Club domestic league appearances and goals

Petar Jelić (Serbian Cyrillic: Петар Јелић; born 18 October 1986) is a Bosnian Serb former international footballer.

== Club career ==
Jelić played for FK Modriča Maxima in the Premier League of Bosnia and Herzegovina until he signed with 1. FC Nürnberg of the Bundesliga. Nürnberg had loaned Jelić to Second Division side FC Carl Zeiss Jena, but he could not gain a place in the first team. After his return to Nuremberg, he was sold to OFK Beograd. In summer 2010 he joined Russian side FC Volga Nizhny Novgorod where he stayed until summer 2013, with an exception of a loan to FC Dinamo Tbilisi in 2011. In summer 2013 he returned to Serbia and joined Serbian SuperLiga side FK Novi Pazar. Jelić transferred to China League One side Guangdong Sunray Cave on 23 March 2014.

In summer 2014 he returned to Serbia and joined FK Rad. In his debut in the 2014–15 Serbian SuperLiga he scored five goals in the victory over Voždovac by 6–1. He set the record of goals per game (5) since the formation of the Serbian SuperLiga in 2006.

== International career ==
He made his debut for Bosnia and Herzegovina in a May 2006 friendly match away against South Korea and has earned a total of 2 caps, scoring no goals. His second and final international was another friendly, 5 days later against Iran.

== Personal life ==
Jelić's father, Milan Jelić, was a Bosnian Serb politician and the 6th President of Republika Srpska.

== Honours ==
=== Player ===
Individual

- Bosnian Premier League top scorer: 2005–06
