= Ruslan Pashtov =

Russian footballer (born 1992)

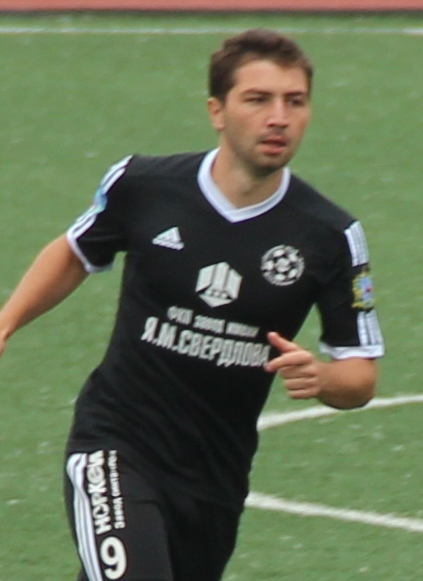
- Pashtov with Khimik in 2014

Personal information
- Full name: Ruslan Vladimirovich Pashtov
- Date of birth: 28 November 1992 (age 33)
- Place of birth: Nalchik, Russia
- Height: 1.74 m (5 ft 9 in)
- Position: Midfielder

Senior career*
Years	Team	Apps	(Gls)
2009–2010	FC Dynamo Moscow	0	(0)
2011–2015	FC Volga Nizhny Novgorod	3	(0)
2013–2015	→ FC Khimik Dzerzhinsk (loan)	36	(2)
2015–2016	FC Avangard Kursk	21	(4)
2016–2017	FC Sokol Saratov	33	(3)
2017	PFC Spartak Nalchik	15	(0)
2018	FC Dynamo-2 Saint Petersburg	7	(0)
2018	FC Dynamo Saint Petersburg	0	(0)
2018–2019	FC Murom	19	(5)
2019	FC Ararat Moscow	8	(0)
2020–2021	PFC Spartak Nalchik	24	(4)
2021–2023	FC Forte Taganrog	40	(4)

International career
2010	Russia U-18	8	(3)
2011	Russia U-19	4	(1)
- * Club domestic league appearances and goals

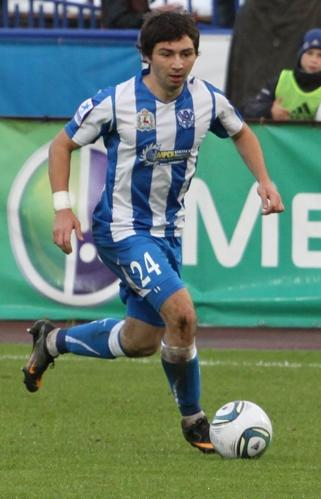
Ruslan Pashtov in Volga

Ruslan Vladimirovich Pashtov (Russian: Руслан Владимирович Паштов; born 28 November 1992) is a Russian former professional footballer.

== Club career ==
He made his professional debut in the Russian Premier League on 1 October 2011 for FC Volga Nizhny Novgorod in a game against FC Amkar Perm.
