= Aleksei Mamonov =

Russian footballer

Personal information
- Full name: Aleksei Igorevich Mamonov
- Date of birth: 14 April 1993 (age 33)
- Place of birth: Poltava, Ukraine
- Height: 1.84 m (6 ft 0 in)
- Position: Defender

Youth career
- FC Lokomotiv Moscow

Senior career*
Years	Team	Apps	(Gls)
2012–2013	FC Volga Nizhny Novgorod	1	(0)
2013	FC Terek Grozny	0	(0)
2013	→ FC Terek-2 Grozny	17	(0)
2014	Olimpik Mytishchi		
2015–2017	FC Solyaris Moscow	40	(3)
2017–2018	FC Veles Moscow	34	(4)

International career
2010	Russia U-17	7	(0)
2010–2011	Russia U-18	8	(1)
2012	Russia U-19	5	(0)
2013	Russia U-20	3	(0)
- * Club domestic league appearances and goals

Aleksei Igorevich Mamonov (Russian: Алексей Игоревич Мамонов; born 14 April 1993) is a Russian former professional football player.

== Club career ==
He made his Russian Premier League debut for FC Volga Nizhny Novgorod on 13 May 2012 in a game against FC Amkar Perm.
