= Dmitri Karasyov =

Russian footballer

Personal information
- Full name: Dmitri Alekseyevich Karasyov
- Date of birth: 1 April 1992 (age 34)
- Height: 1.74 m (5 ft 9 in)
- Positions: Midfielder; forward

Senior career*
Years	Team	Apps	(Gls)
2011–2013	FC Volga Nizhny Novgorod	3	(0)
2013	FC Sever Murmansk	11	(0)
2014	FC Terek-2 Grozny	11	(1)
2014–2015	FC Syzran-2003 Syzran	21	(0)
2015–2016	FC Volga-Olimpiyets Nizhny Novgorod	15	(0)
2017	FC Murom	13	(0)
- * Club domestic league appearances and goals

Dmitri Alekseyevich Karasyov (Russian: Дмитрий Алексеевич Карасёв; born 1 April 1992) is a Russian former professional football player.

== Club career ==
He made his Russian Premier League debut for FC Volga Nizhny Novgorod on 15 April 2012 in a game against PFC Spartak Nalchik.
