= Aleksei Sapogov =

Russian footballer

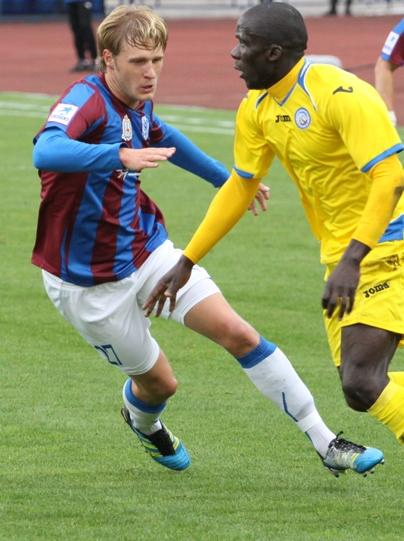
- Sapogov (left) with Volga NN in 2012

Personal information
- Full name: Aleksei Viktorovich Sapogov
- Date of birth: 2 April 1988 (age 38)
- Place of birth: Leninsk-Kuznetsky, Kemerovo Oblast, Russian SFSR
- Height: 1.86 m (6 ft 1 in)
- Position: Forward

Youth career
- FC Lokomotiv Moscow

Senior career*
Years	Team	Apps	(Gls)
2006	FC Torpedo Moscow	0	(0)
2007–2008	FC Zelenograd	18	(2)
2009–2010	FC Volga Tver	47	(12)
2011–2012	FC Gornyak Uchaly	33	(17)
2012–2013	FC Volga Nizhny Novgorod	22	(8)
2014	FK Spartaks Jūrmala	10	(3)

International career
2012	Russia-2	1	(1)
- * Club domestic league appearances and goals

Aleksei Viktorovich Sapogov (Алексей Викторович Сапогов; born 2 April 1988) is a retired Russian professional football player who played as a forward. He is best known for his time with FC Volga Nizhny Novgorod in the Russian Premier League.

== Career ==
Sapogov was born in Leninsk-Kuznetsky, Kemerovo Oblast. A graduate of the Lokomotiv Moscow youth system, he started his professional career in 2006 with FC Torpedo Moscow. He later played for FC Zelenograd, FC Volga Tver, and FC Gornyak Uchaly, where he became one of the top scorers in the Russian Football National League, netting 17 goals in 33 appearances.

In 2012, he signed with FC Volga Nizhny Novgorod and made his debut in the Russian Premier League, scoring 8 goals in 22 matches during the 2012–13 season. In 2014, he joined FK Spartaks Jūrmala in the Latvian Higher League, making 10 appearances and scoring three goals.

== Incident with Shamil Asildarov ==
In early 2014, while on trial with FC Anzhi Makhachkala during a training camp in Turkey, Sapogov was reportedly involved in a physical altercation with striker Shamil Asildarov, resulting in a jaw fracture. The conflict gained renewed attention in 2021 when Sapogov challenged Asildarov to a public fight via social media, suggesting a cage match with bare fists.

== International career ==
In 2012, Sapogov was called up to the Russia-2 squad, where he scored one goal in his only appearance.

== Career statistics ==
As of 20 October 2025

Season	Club	League	Apps	Goals
2006	FC Torpedo Moscow	Russian Second Division	0	0
2007–2008	FC Zelenograd	Russian Second Division	18	2
2009–2010	FC Volga Tver	Russian Second Division	47	12
2011–2012	FC Gornyak Uchaly	FNL	33	17
2012–2013	FC Volga Nizhny Novgorod	RPL	22	8
2014	FK Spartaks Jūrmala	Virslīga	10	3
