= Aleksandr Shulenin =

Russian footballer

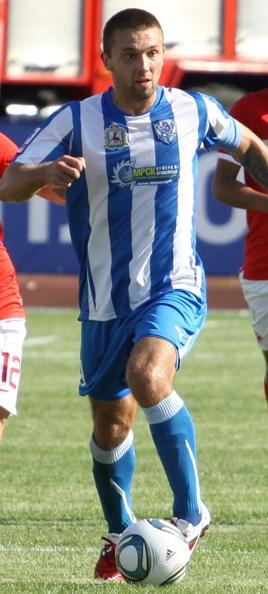
- Shulenin with Volga NN in 2011

Personal information
- Full name: Aleksandr Lvovich Shulenin
- Date of birth: 31 October 1979 (age 46)
- Place of birth: Skhodnya, Russian SFSR (now part of Khimki)
- Height: 1.78 m (5 ft 10 in)
- Position: Midfielder

Team information
- Current team: FC Irtysh Omsk (physical training coach)

Youth career
- FC Khimki

Senior career*
Years	Team	Apps	(Gls)
1998–2003	FC Khimki	140	(7)
2001	→ FC Khimki-2	12	(2)
2004–2006	FC Sodovik Sterlitamak	75	(9)
2007	FC Shinnik Yaroslavl	22	(1)
2008–2010	FC Sibir Novosibirsk	78	(4)
2010–2015	FC Volga Nizhny Novgorod	76	(7)
2015	→ FC Baltika Kaliningrad	11	(0)

Managerial career
- 2017–2018: FC Amkar Perm (U-21 physical training coach)
- 2020–2022: FC Lokomotiv Moscow (U-21 physical training coach)
- 2022–2023: FC Torpedo Moscow (physical training coach)
- 2024–: FC Irtysh Omsk (physical training coach)
- * Club domestic league appearances and goals

Aleksandr Lvovich Shulenin (Russian: Александр Львович Шуленин; born 31 October 1979) is a Russian professional football coach and a former player. He is the physical training coach of FC Irtysh Omsk.

== Club career ==
He made his professional debut in the Russian Second Division in 1998 for FC Khimki.
