= Dani Bondar =

Israeli footballer (born 1987)

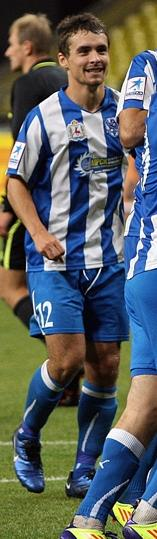

Personal information
- Full name: Dani Bondar
- Date of birth: 7 February 1987 (age 39)
- Place of birth: Moscow, Soviet Union
- Height: 1.77 m (5 ft 9 1/2 in)
- Position: Right back

Youth career
- 1997–1999: Hakoah Afek
- 1999–2006: Hapoel Tel Aviv

Senior career*
Years	Team	Apps	(Gls)
2006–2011	Hapoel Tel Aviv	75	(1)
2009–2010	→ Ironi Kiryat Shmona (loan)	10	(0)
2011–2013	Volga Nizhny Novgorod	14	(0)
2013	Tavriya Simferopol	0	(0)
2014	Khimik Dzerzhinsk	0	(0)

International career
2006–2007	Israel U-21	4	(0)
2010–2011	Israel	6	(0)

Managerial career
- 2016–: Hapoel Ra'anana (youth)
- * Club domestic league appearances and goals

Dani Bondar (Hebrew: דני בונדר; born 7 February 1987) is an Israeli former footballer who played as a defender.

== Biography ==
Bondar was born on 7 February 1987 in Moscow, Russian SFSR, Soviet Union, and in 1990 went abroad to Israel to Kibbutz Gazit in the Jezreel Valley. In Gazit, Bondar started his football career and played until the age of 12. After that, he moved to Hakoah Afek. Today Bondarv plays in Hapoel Tel Aviv as a right-back.

== Club career ==
In the summer of 2006, Bondar moved up from the youth team to the first team of Hapoel by the team coach, Itzhak Shum. Despite his young age, Bondar played in UEFA Cup game against NK Domžale in the second qualifying round of the tournament.

On 17 June 2010, it was reported that Ukrainian side Zorya Luhansk is interested in Bondar.

In August 2011 he signed with FC Volga Nizhny Novgorod. He played there until he was released in January 2013.

On 4 September 2014, Bondar had retired from his football career.

== Career statistics ==
=== Club ===
Club performance			League		Cup		League Cup		Continental		Total	
Season	Club	League	Apps	Goals	Apps	Goals	Apps	Goals	Apps	Goals	Apps	Goals
Israel			League		Israel State Cup		Toto Cup		Europe		Total	
2004–05	Hapoel Tel Aviv	Israeli Premier League	?	?	?	?	1	0	0	0	?	?
2005–06	Hapoel Tel Aviv	Israeli Premier League	?	?	?	?	?	?	0	0	?	?
2006–07	Hapoel Tel Aviv	Israeli Premier League	23	0	1	0	6	0	5	0	35	0
2007–08	Hapoel Tel Aviv	Israeli Premier League	11	0	0	0	4	0	5	0	20	0
2008–09	Hapoel Tel Aviv	Israeli Premier League	2	0	0	0	1	0	0	0	3	0
2008–09	Ironi Kiryat Shmona (loan)	Israeli Premier League	10	0	1	0	1	0	0	0	12	0
2009–10	Hapoel Tel Aviv	Israeli Premier League	23	0	0	0	4	0	7	0	34	0
2010–11	Hapoel Tel Aviv	Israeli Premier League	16	1	0	0	0	0	8	0	14	1
Russia			League		Russian Cup		Playoffs		Europe		Total	
2011–12	Volga Nizhny Novgorod	Russian Premier League	12	0	1	0	2	0	-		15	0
2012–13	Volga Nizhny Novgorod	Russian Premier League	0	0	0	0	-		-		0	0
Total	Israel		85	1	?	?	?	?	?	?	?	?
Total	Russia		12	0	1	0	2	0	-		15	0
Career total			?	?	?	?	?	?	?	?	?	?
