= Aleksandr Budanov =

Russian professional football player

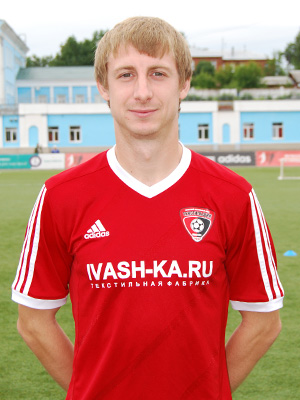

Personal information
- Full name: Aleksandr Sergeyevich Budanov
- Date of birth: 27 April 1991 (age 35)
- Place of birth: Sergiyev Posad, Russian SFSR
- Height: 1.78 m (5 ft 10 in)
- Position: Midfielder

Senior career*
Years	Team	Apps	(Gls)
2010–2011	FC Krylia Sovetov Samara	2	(0)
2012	FC Volga Nizhny Novgorod	0	(0)
2012–2013	FC Syzran-2003 Syzran	9	(1)
2013–2014	FC Lada-Togliatti Togliatti	8	(0)
2014–2015	FC Strogino Moscow	39	(3)
2015–2016	FC Tekstilshchik Ivanovo	19	(3)
2016–2019	FC Sergiyev Posad		

International career
2008	Russia U-17	6	(1)
2010	Russia U-19	2	(0)
2012	Russia U-21	4	(0)
- * Club domestic league appearances and goals

Aleksandr Sergeyevich Budanov (Russian: Александр Серге́евич Буданов; born 27 April 1991) is a Russian former professional football player.

== Club career ==
He made his Russian Premier League debut on 13 March 2010 for FC Krylia Sovetov Samara in a game against FC Zenit St. Petersburg.
