= Andrei Karyaka =

Russian footballer (born 1978)

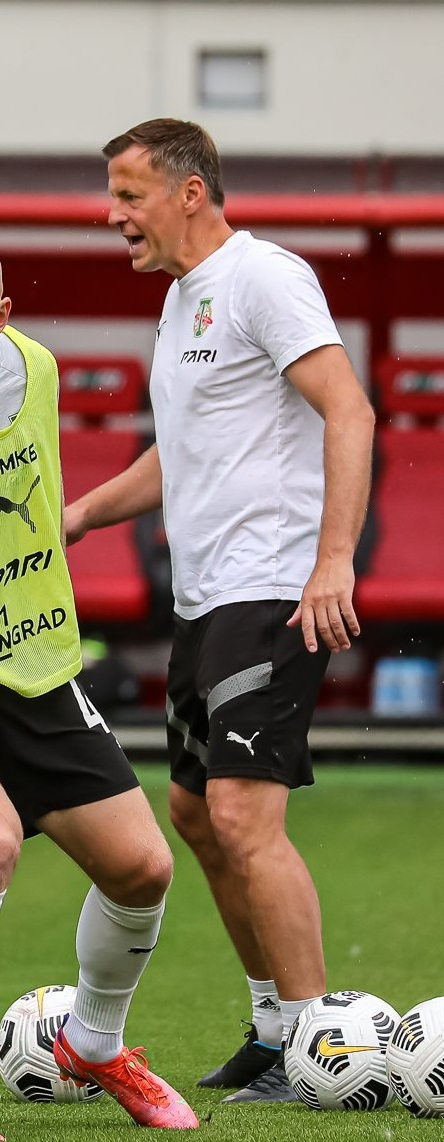
- Karyaka with Torpedo Moscow in 2022

Personal information
- Full name: Andrei Konstantinovich Karyaka
- Date of birth: 1 April 1978 (age 48)
- Place of birth: Dnipropetrovsk, Ukrainian SSR, Soviet Union
- Height: 1.80 m (5 ft 11 in)
- Position: Left midfielder

Youth career
- 1985–1990: Dnipropetrovsk Youth Sports School
- 1990–1995: Dnipropetrovsk Olympic Reserve School
- 1995–1996: Metalurh Zaporizhya

Senior career*
| Years | Team | Apps | (Gls) |
| 1996–1998 | Metalurh Zaporizhya | 49 | (8) |
| 1998–2000 | CSKA Kyiv | 35 | (4) |
| 1998–2000 | → CSKA-2 Kyiv | 42 | (5) |
| 2000–2005 | Krylia Sovetov Samara | 130 | (49) |
| 2000 | → Krylia Sovetov-2 Samara | 4 | (1) |
| 2005–2007 | Benfica | 11 | (2) |
| 2007–2010 | Saturn Moscow Oblast | 108 | (18) |
| 2011 | Dynamo Moscow | 12 | (0) |
| 2012–2014 | Volga Nizhny Novgorod | 65 | (8) |
| Total | | 456 | (96) |

International career
| 1997 | Ukraine (students) | | |
| 2001–2005 | Russia | 27 | (6) |

Managerial career
- 2015–2018: Amkar Perm (assistant)
- 2021: Rodina Moscow (assistant)
- 2021: Rodina-2 Moscow (assistant)
- 2021–2022: Torpedo Moscow (assistant)
- * Club domestic league appearances and goals

Andrei Konstantinovich Karyaka (Russian: Андрей Константинович Каряка; born 1 April 1978) is a Ukrainian and Russian football coach and a former player who played as a midfielder.

== Club career ==
=== Early career ===
Growing up in Dnipropetrovsk in the 1980s, Karyaka was deeply influenced and inspired by the performances of the local club Dnipro Dnipropetrovsk. After multiple championships and two quarter-final finishes in European competition, it is not surprising that his major heroes were the Dnipro Dnipropetrovsk leaders, such as Hennadiy Lytovchenko and Oleh Protasov. Karyaka attended the Dnipropetrovsk Sports Youth School, coached by W. M. Nikulin, starting at the age of 7, and the Dnipropetrovsk Olympic Reserve School starting at the age of 12. In 1985, he moved to Zaporizhzhia where he initially played for the Metalurh Zaporizhzhia youth team.

Karyaka's debut for the main team occurred on 3 March 1996, in the 1/16 round of the Ukrainian Cup against the Shakhtar Donetsk reserve, and ended in a 1–0 victory for Metalurh, while Karyaka earned a yellow card. His Ukrainian Premier League debut occurred on 26 March 1996 against his original home team Dnipro Dnipropetrovsk, and ended with a 2–1 Metalurh victory. He scored his first goal on 13 November 1996 in the Ukrainian Cup, and on 10 April 1997 in the Ukrainian Premier League. Other memorable games include a tie against Dynamo Kyiv in blistering heat on 30 June 1997.

In 1998, Karyaka transferred to CSKA Kyiv, trained by the former Dynamo Kyiv midfielder Volodymyr Bezsonov. With CSKA, he was able to participate in the UEFA Cup Winners' Cup, first playing against Cork City, and consequently, against Lokomotiv Moscow. Yet in the next season, things did not work out as well, and he spent the majority of the 1999–00 season playing for the reserve team.

=== Krylia Sovetov ===
In the summer of 2000, Karyaka was able to impress the at-the-time Krylia Sovetov Samara coach Aleksandr Tarkhanov during a trial match against Lada with his approach and style. He debuted for Samara against Anzhi Makhachkala on 13 August 2000, earning a penalty and rescuing a tie. He spent five games on the pitch in the 2000 season. After a thorough preparation for the 2001 season, he secured a regular spot as a left midfielder on the main team. In 2002, Karyaka became the top scorer of Samara with 12 goals in 28 games, and on 19 August 2003 he became the top scorer of the team overall in the history of the Russian Premier League with 29 goals. That season he scored 10 goals total in 29 games, but his real success at Samara would come in 2004, where he tallied 22 goals in 37 games. 17 of these came in the Russian Premier League and he missed the best scorer title by only one goal. A number of his goals came from free kicks from 30 yards out and more.

=== Benfica ===
Following the start of the 2005 Russian Premier League, Karyaka's club at that time Krylia Sovetov Samara encountered financial difficulties which saw the club sell some of its high valued players. This was the case for Karyaka who in June 2005 signed for Benfica of the Primeira Liga. He signed for the Portuguese side on a fee worth €1 million.

Karyaka made his team debut as an 80th-minute substitute in a 1–0 victory over Vitória de Setúbal in the 2005 Supertaça Cândido de Oliveira. During the first part of the 2005–06 season, he would feature regularly in Benfica's side where he was primarily used by coach Ronald Koeman as a substitute. He scored his first goal for the club on 22 October 2005 in a league match against Estrela da Amadora.

In January 2006, Russian sports newspaper Sovetsky Sport published an interview with Karyaka who criticized his role at the club and his stay in Portugal. In the interview, Karyaka criticized manager Ronald Koeman for him being used as a substitute as well as saying that Koeman favored Benfica's Brazilian players ahead of him. In the interview he also expressed his desire to return to Russia as well as expressing his desire to leave Portugal as he felt uncomfortable by the country and the city of Lisbon. Following the interview, Benfica's manager Ronald Koeman publicly expressed his opinion on the situation and said that he was surprised by Karyaka's statements and that he did not favor the clubs Brazilian players. One day following the publication of the interview in the Russian sports newspaper, Benfica suspended Karyaka. Following Karyaka's suspension, Benfica would file a lawsuit against the player. Karyaka's suspension saw him publicly express his outrage and disappointment with Benfica's decision to suspend him as well as denying the accusations publicized by Sovetsky Sport. He also went on to say that he would file a lawsuit against the newspaper which published the controversial interview. In May 2006, Karyaka would return to Benfica's squad for the first time since December. He would play 59 minutes in the last fixture of the 2005–06 season against Paços de Ferreira.

In July 2006, Karyaka won a lawsuit against the publication who he allegedly interviewed for. It was revealed that the interview publicized by the newspaper was a fabrication. Despite a second half of the season being excluded from the Benfica squad as well as being surrounded by controversy during his first season with Benfica, he remained with the Lisbon side for another season. Under the new management of Fernando Santos for the 2006–07 season, he was primarily used as a fringe player in Benfica's squad. His most notable moment of his second season with Benfica was scoring against Celtic in a 2006–07 UEFA Champions League group stage match.

=== Return to Russia ===
In January 2007, he signed for Saturn Moscow Oblast on loan. After a successful loan spell with Saturn where the club finished fifth in the league and scored ten goals in twenty eight appearances, Saturn purchased him from Benfica for €2 million. His three-year spell with Saturn proved to be successful as he managed 108 appearances, scoring eighteen goals. In January 2011, he moved to Dynamo Moscow. His stay with the Moscow outfit proved to be short-lived as he left the club after only twelve appearances. Following his departure from Dynamo Moscow, he signed for Volga Nizhny Novgorod.

== International career ==
Born in Ukraine, and called up for various of their youth national teams, Karyaka never came on pitch for a single national team game. He received a call up to the Ukraine national team on 24 May 2001, but the Russia and Uzbekistan national teams were interested in him as well. On 29 May, he made the decision to play for the Russian team, and consequently received his first call-up on 7 August of the same year, playing his first game on 16 August against Greece. Since then, Karyaka has been one of the vital players for the Russian midfield, starting 27 games and scoring 6 goals. He was part of the 2004 European Football Championship and played all three games for 140 minutes.

== Career statistics ==
Andrei Karyaka: International goals
| No. | Date | Venue | Opponent | Score | Result | Competition |
|---|---|---|---|---|---|---|
| 1 | 7 September 2002 | Lokomotiv Stadium (Moscow), Moscow, Russia | Republic of Ireland | 1–0 | 4–2 | Euro 2004 Qualification |
| 2 | 29 March 2003 | Loro Boriçi Stadium, Shkodër, Albania | Albania | 1–1 | 3–1 | Euro 2004 Qualification |
| 3 | 17 August 2004 | Arena Khimki, Moscow, Russia | Lithuania | 2–1 | 4–3 | Friendly |
| 4 | 17 November 2004 | Kuban Stadium, Krasnodar, Russia | Estonia | 1–0 | 4–0 | 2006 World Cup Qualification |
| 5 | 26 March 2005 | Rheinpark Stadion, Vaduz, Liechtenstein | Liechtenstein | 0–2 | 1–2 | 2006 World Cup Qualification |

== Honours ==
Benfica

- Supertaça Cândido de Oliveira: 2005
