= Shota Bibilov =

Russian footballer

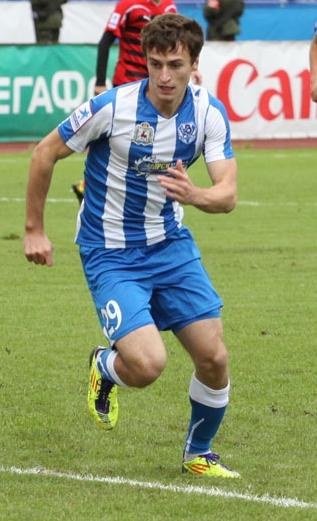
- Bibilov with Volga Nizhny Novgorod in 2011

Personal information
- Full name: Shota Gennadyevich Bibilov
- Date of birth: 6 August 1990 (age 36)
- Place of birth: Mzianeti, Gardabani Municipality, Georgian SSR
- Height: 1.79 m (5 ft 10 in)
- Position: Midfielder

Senior career*
Years	Team	Apps	(Gls)
2008–2010	FC Alania Vladikavkaz	15	(0)
2011–2014	FC Volga Nizhny Novgorod	59	(11)
2014–2016	FC Rubin Kazan	0	(0)
2016	FC Olimpiyets Nizhny Novgorod	7	(0)
2017	FC Volgar Astrakhan	4	(0)
2017–2018	FC Spartak Vladikavkaz	11	(0)
2019	FC Spartak Vladikavkaz	10	(2)

International career
2009	Russia U-19	8	(2)
2012–2013	Russia U-21	20	(5)
- * Club domestic league appearances and goals

Shota Gennadyevich Bibilov (Russian: Шота Геннадьевич Бибилов; born 6 August 1990) is a Russian former professional footballer.

== Club career ==
He made his professional debut in the Russian First Division in 2008 for FC Alania Vladikavkaz.

He played his first game for the main squad of FC Rubin Kazan on 24 September 2015 in a Russian Cup game against FC SKA-Energiya Khabarovsk which his team lost 0-2.
