= Lokomotiv Stadium (Nizhny Novgorod) =

Multi-purpose stadium in Nizhny Novgorod, Russia

Coordinates: 56°18′33.91″N 43°55′44.06″E

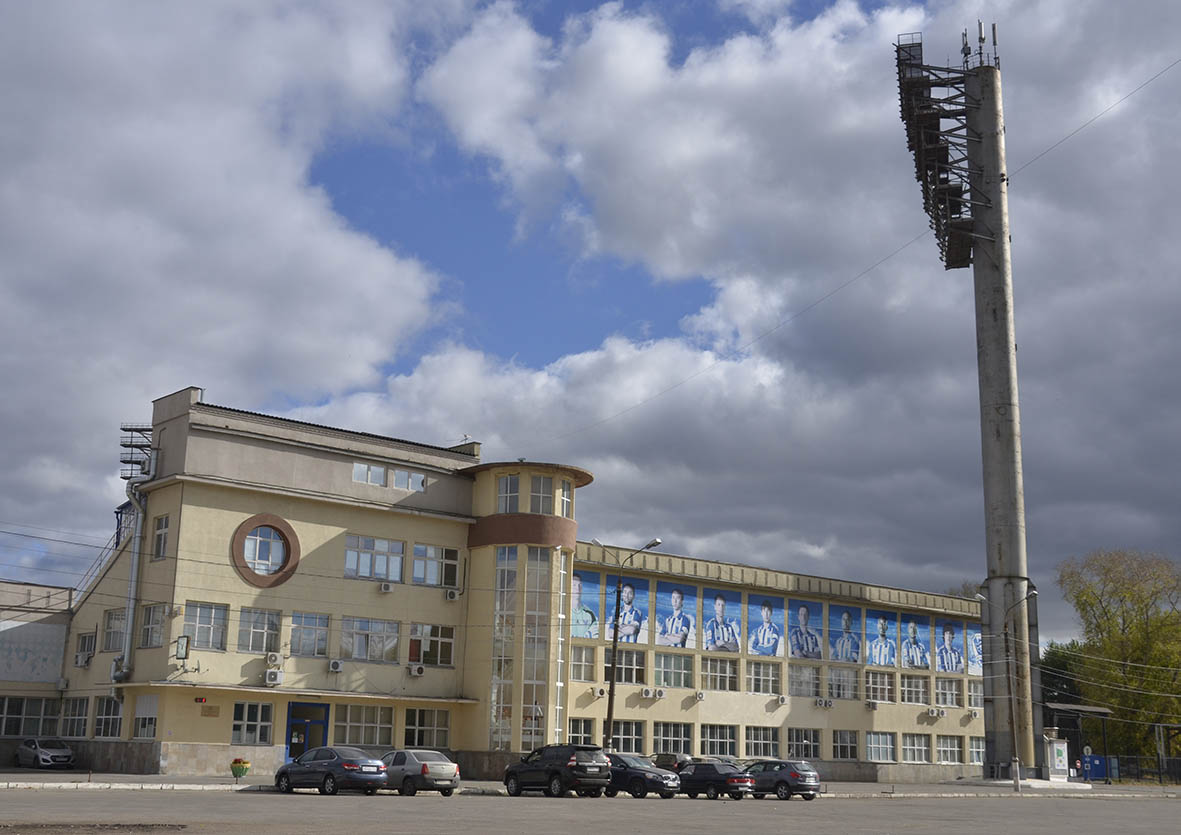
- Interactive map of Lokomotiv Stadium
- Location: Nizhny Novgorod, Russia
- Capacity: 17,856
- Surface: Grass

Construction
- Opened: 1932

Tenant
- Olimpiyets Nizhny Novgorod

The Lokomotiv Central Stadium is a multi-purpose stadium in Nizhny Novgorod, Russia. It is currently used mostly for football matches and was the home ground of Olimpiyets Nizhny Novgorod. The stadium holds 17,856 people and was opened in 1932. It underwent its most recent reconstruction in 1997. It should not be confused with the Lokomotiv Central Stadium in Moscow, the home of Lokomotiv Moscow.

Presently, it is the home arena of Olimpiyets Nizhny Novgorod.
