= FC Nizhny Novgorod (2007) =

Nizhny Novgorod
- Full name: Football Club; Nizhny Novgorod
- Founded: 2007; 19 years ago
- Dissolved: 2012; 14 years ago
- Ground: North Stadium, Nizhny Novgorod
- Capacity: 3,180
Home colours	Away colours

FC Nizhny Novgorod (Russian: ФК "Нижний Новгород") was an association football club based in Nizhny Novgorod, Russia. It played three seasons in the Russian First Division.

== History ==
In December 2007, a new team formed from an amateur team playing in the regional championship. The team entered the Amateur Football League and got promoted to the Russian Second Division. The team entered Russian First Division for 2009 despite not qualifying in 2008 after several clubs ahead of them were unable to participate for financial reasons despite finishing 3rd in Zone Volga Region. In 2012, the club was merged into FC Volga Nizhny Novgorod.
