= FC Volga Nizhny Novgorod =

FC Volga
- Full name: Некоммерческое партнерство Футбольный Клуб Волга Нижний Новгород (Non-Commercial Partnership Football Club Volga Nizhny Novgorod)
- Nickname: Volgari (The Volga Natives)
- Founded: 1963; 63 years ago
- Dissolved: 2016; 10 years ago
- Ground: Lokomotiv Stadium
- Capacity: 17,856
- Owner: Igor Zheleznyakov/Vladimir Zinovyev/Aleksandr Kuznetsov
- Chairman: Oleg Alyoshin
- League: FNL
- 2015–16: 10th
Home colours	Away colours

FC Volga Nizhny Novgorod (Russian: Футбольный Клуб "Волга" Нижний Новгород) was a Russian football club from Nizhny Novgorod, founded in 1998. In 2008, FC Volga won the Ural-Povolzhye (Volga Region in Russian) zone of the Russian Second Division and advanced to the Russian First Division. In 2010 they promoted to the Russian Premier League. After the 2013–14 season, they were relegated to the second level once more. On 15 June 2016, the club was dissolved due to inability to service the accumulated debts.

== History ==
The team was founded in 1963 after a merger of two teams from Gorky – Torpedo and Raketa. The team played in the Soviet Top League, where its best result was 14th place in 1964. The team was disbanded in 1984. In 1998, a new club called FC Elektronika Nizhny Novgorod was founded. It played in Russian Second Division. In 2004 it was renamed to Volga.

FC Torpedo-Viktoriya Nizhny Novgorod was another squad to claim the legacy of FC Volga Gorky.

In the 2015–16 season, Volga registered a reserve team FC Volga-Olimpiyets Nizhny Novgorod that entered the third-tier PFL. After Volga itself was dissolved, Volga-Olimpiyets became independent was renamed to FC Olimpiyets. It eventually was promoted to the Russian Premier League under the name FC Nizhny Novgorod and is called, as of 2023, FC Pari Nizhny Novgorod.

=== League history ===
==== Russia ====
Season	Div.	Pos.	Pl.	W	D	L	GS	GA	P	Cup	Europe	Top scorer (League)
1999	KFK(4th), "Povolzhye"	7	-	-	-	-	-	-	-	-	-	-
2000	KFK(4th), "Povolzhye"	3	-	-	-	-	-	-	-	-	-	-
2001	3rd, "Ural-Povolzhye"	9	34	13	10	11	54	43	49	-	-	(Russia) Kuznetsov – 12
2002	3rd, "Ural-Povolzhye"	6	30	12	8	10	40	38	44	R256	-	(Russia) Andrei Podolyanchik – 9
2003	3rd, "Ural-Povolzhye"	14	38	11	5	22	41	62	38	R256	-	(Russia) Andrei Podolyanchik – 14
2004	3rd, "Ural-Povolzhye"	12	36	12	9	15	41	46	45	R512	-	(Russia) Georgiev – 9
2005	3rd, "Ural-Povolzhye"	6	36	15	12	9	44	30	57	R256	-	(Russia) Udodov – 7
2006	3rd, "Ural-Povolzhye"	7	24	10	8	6	31	23	38	R512	-	(Russia) Loginov – 5
2007	3rd, "Ural-Povolzhye"	4	26	15	5	6	52	30	50	R256	-	(Russia) Kaynov – 11
2008	3rd, "Ural-Povolzhye"	1	34	23	9	2	73	23	78	R512	-	(Russia) Prokofyev – 17
2009	2nd	4	38	17	14	7	54	32	65	R16	-	(Russia) Khazov – 10
2010	2nd	2	38	19	14	5	62	25	71	R64	-	(Georgia (country)) Martsvaladze – 21
2011–12	1st	14	44	12	5	27	37	60	41	SF	-	(Russia) Bibilov – 7
2012–13	1st	12	30	7	8	15	28	46	29	R32	-	(Russia) Sapogov – 9
2013–14	1st	15	30	6	3	21	22	65	21	R32	-	(Armenia) Sarkisov, (Russia) Bibilov – 3
2014–15	2nd	13	34	12	4	18	44	57	40	R64	-	(Armenia) Sarkisov – 12
2015–16	2nd	10	38	14	9	15	39	37	51	R32	-	

== Farm club ==
No farm club

== Notable players ==
Had international caps for their respective countries. Players whose name is listed in bold represented their countries while playing for Volga.

Russia

- (Russia) Evgeni Aldonin
- (Russia) Dmitri Bulykin
- (Russia) Taras Burlak
- (Russia) Andrei Karyaka
- (Russia) Denis Kolodin
- (Russia) Ilya Maksimov
- (Russia) Dmitri Sychev
- (Russia) Andrey Yeshchenko

Europe
Bosnia and Herzegovina

- (Bosnia and Herzegovina) Petar Jelić
- (Bosnia and Herzegovina) Mersudin Ahmetović

Israel

- (Israel) Dani Bondar

Netherlands

- (Netherlands) Romeo Castelen

Poland

- (Poland) Marcin Kowalczyk
- (Poland) Piotr Polczak

Romania

- (Romania) Mihăiţă Pleşan
- (Romania) Adrian Ropotan

South & Central America
Jamaica

- (Jamaica) Luton Shelton

Former USSR countries

- (Armenia) **Artur Sarkisov**
- (Azerbaijan) Vagif Javadov
- (Belarus) **Anton Putsila**
- (Belarus) Igor Stasevich
- (Georgia (country)) **Gogita Gogua**
- (Georgia (country)) **Gia Grigalava**
- (Georgia (country)) **Gocha Khojava**
- (Georgia (country)) **Otar Martsvaladze**
- (Georgia (country)) Giorgi Navalovski
- (Georgia (country)) Edik Sadzhaya
- (Georgia (country)) **Lasha Salukvadze**
- (Georgia (country)) Mate Vatsadze
- (Kyrgyzstan) Valerii Kichin
- (Moldova) Vitalie Bordian
- (Moldova) Simeon Bulgaru
- (Tajikistan) Rustam Yatimov
- (Uzbekistan) **Sanzhar Tursunov**

== Managers ==
- (Russia) Sergey Frantsev (2005)
- (Russia) Sergei Petrenko (7 Dec 2007 – 5 June 2009)
- (Russia) Sergei Perednya (interim) (5 June 2009 – 31 Dec 2009)
- (Russia) Khazret Dyshekov (20 July 2009–09)
- (Russia) Aleksandr Pobegalov (1 Jan 2010 – 7 May 2010)
- (Georgia (country)) Omari Tetradze (8 May 2010 – 15 June 2011)
- (Russia) Dmitri Cheryshev (16 June 2011 – 30 June 2012)
- (Russia) Gadzhi Gadzhiev (1 July 2012 – 26 Dec 2012)
- (Ukraine) Yuriy Kalitvintsev (19 Jan 2013 – 27 March 2014)
- (Russia) Andrei Talalayev (29 March 2014 – 15 June 2016)
