= 2013–14 FC Volga Nizhny Novgorod season =

Volga Nizhny Novgorod
2013–14 season
- Chairman: Oleg Alyoshin
- Manager: Yuriy Kalitvintsev until 28 March 2014; Andrei Talalayev from 29 March 2014
- Stadium: Lokomotiv Stadium
- Russian Premier League: 15th Relegated
- Russian Cup: Fifth-Round vs SKA-Energiya Khabarovsk
- Top goalscorer: League: Two Players (3); All: Two Players (3)
Home colours	Away colours	Third colours

The 2013–14 FC Volga Nizhny Novgorod season was the club's 3rd and final season in the Russian Premier League, the highest tier of football in Russia, following their promotion at the end of the 2010 season. They finished the season in 15th place and were relegated from the Premier League. Volga also took part in the 2013–14 Russian Cup, where they were knocked out at the fifth-round stage by SKA-Energiya Khabarovsk.

== Squad ==
Note: Flags indicate national team as defined under FIFA eligibility rules; some limited exceptions apply. Players may hold more than one non-FIFA nationality.

No.	Pos.	Nation	Player
1	GK	RUS	Artur Nigmatullin
3	DF	MDA	Simeon Bulgaru
4	DF	POL	Marcin Kowalczyk
5	MF	RUS	Andrei Karyaka
6	DF	RUS	Dmitriy Polyanin
7	FW	ARM	Artur Sarkisov
8	DF	RUS	Denis Kolodin
9	MF	RUS	Aleksandr Shulenin
10	FW	RUS	Dmitri Sychev (on loan from Lokomotiv Moscow)
11	MF	RUS	Roman Kontsedalov
14	MF	BLR	Anton Putsila
16	MF	RUS	Nikita Malyarov
17	MF	ARM	Artur Minosyan
19	MF	ROU	Adrian Ropotan
20	MF	RUS	Evgeni Aldonin

No.	Pos.	Nation	Player
21	MF	JAM	Luton Shelton
22	FW	COD	Mulumba Mukendi
23	FW	RUS	Dmitri Bulykin
25	DF	RUS	Andrei Buivolov
26	DF	POL	Piotr Polczak
27	GK	RUS	Mikhail Komarov
29	MF	RUS	Shota Bibilov
30	MF	POL	Ariel Borysiuk (on loan from Kaiserslautern)
33	DF	SRB	Milan Rodić (on loan from Zenit Saint Petersburg)
35	GK	EST	Sergei Pareiko
37	DF	MDA	Vitalie Bordian
44	DF	RUS	Nikita Chicherin
39	FW	RUS	Artyom Danilenko
77	MF	BRA	Leandro
80	MF	RUS	Yevgeni Kozlov

=== Out on loan ===
Note: Flags indicate national team as defined under FIFA eligibility rules; some limited exceptions apply. Players may hold more than one non-FIFA nationality.

No. / Pos. / Nation / Player; 2 / DF / KGZ / Valerii Kichin (at Ufa)	No. / Pos. / Nation / Player; 17 / FW / CRO / Matija Dvorneković (at Torpedo Moscow)

=== Youth team ===
Note: Flags indicate national team as defined under FIFA eligibility rules; some limited exceptions apply. Players may hold more than one non-FIFA nationality.

No.	Pos.	Nation	Player
15	DF	RUS	Andrei Nalyotov
24	DF	RUS	Aleksei Chubukin
28	FW	RUS	Ilya Belous
32	DF	RUS	Nikita Bastron
34	MF	RUS	Yevgeni Degtyaryov
50	DF	RUS	Dmitri Kurayev
51	MF	RUS	Mikhail Zakhryapin
53	MF	RUS	Andrei Churin
55	DF	RUS	Aleksandr Polyakov
66	DF	RUS	Albert Kulayev
70	MF	RUS	Dmitri Pavlov
71	GK	RUS	Aleksandr Kurnikov

No.	Pos.	Nation	Player
79	MF	RUS	Roman Kuzovkin
80	MF	RUS	Dmitry Mikhaylenko
81	GK	RUS	Fyodor Osin
83	FW	RUS	Nikita Yurkov
86	DF	RUS	Igor Maslov
87	MF	RUS	Kirill Zubkov
88	FW	RUS	Denis Kanurin
90	MF	RUS	Aleksei Shelyakov
95	MF	RUS	Ilya Petrov
96	DF	RUS	Nikita Nikolayev
99	MF	RUS	Sergei Garanzha

== Transfers ==
=== Summer ===
In: Note: Flags indicate national team as defined under FIFA eligibility rules; some limited exceptions apply. Players may hold more than one non-FIFA nationality.

No.	Pos.	Nation	Player
1	GK	RUS	Artur Nigmatullin (from (Russia) CSKA Moscow, previously on loan)
4	DF	POL	Marcin Kowalczyk (from (Poland) Śląsk Wrocław)
8	DF	RUS	Denis Kolodin (from (Russia) Dynamo Moscow)
10	FW	RUS	Dmitri Sychev (on loan from (Russia) Lokomotiv Moscow)
11	MF	RUS	Roman Kontsedalov (from (Russia) Spartak Nalchik)
16	MF	RUS	Nikita Malyarov (end of loan to (Russia) FC Ufa)
20	MF	RUS	Evgeni Aldonin (from (Russia) CSKA Moscow)
21	FW	JAM	Luton Shelton (from (Turkey) Karabükspor)
22	FW	COD	Mulumba Mukendi (from (Slovakia) Ružomberok)
23	FW	RUS	Dmitri Bulykin (from (Netherlands) Twente)
26	DF	POL	Piotr Polczak (from (Russia) Terek Grozny, previously on loan)
27	GK	RUS	Mikhail Komarov (free)
33	DF	SRB	Milan Rodić (on loan from (Russia) Zenit St. Petersburg)
35	GK	EST	Sergei Pareiko (from (Poland) Wisła Kraków)
39	FW	RUS	Artyom Danilenko (from (Russia) Khimik Dzerzhinsk)
77	MF	BRA	Leandro (from (Ukraine) Arsenal Kyiv)
80	MF	RUS	Dmitri Mikhailenko (from (Russia) Lokomotiv Moscow)

Out: Note: Flags indicate national team as defined under FIFA eligibility rules; some limited exceptions apply. Players may hold more than one non-FIFA nationality.

No.	Pos.	Nation	Player
2	DF	KGZ	Valerii Kichin (on loan to (Russia) Khimik Dzerzhinsk)
4	MF	RUS	Dmitry Aydov (to (Russia) Torpedo Moscow)
7	MF	RUS	Platon Pchyolkin (to (Russia) Khimki)
8	DF	GEO	Gia Grigalava (to (Russia) Anzhi Makhachkala)
10	MF	NED	Romeo Castelen (to (Netherlands) Waalwijk)
11	FW	RUS	Shamil Asildarov (released)
13	MF	RUS	Dmitri Kudryashov (to (Russia) Torpedo Moscow)
14	FW	ARM	Artur Sarkisov (end of loan from (Russia) Lokomotiv Moscow)
15	DF	RUS	Yegor Tarakanov (to (Russia) Torpedo Moscow)
21	MF	RUS	Ruslan Adzhindzhal (to (Russia) Krylia Sovetov Samara)
22	MF	RUS	Igor Belyakov (to (Russia) Sever Murmansk)
24	MF	RUS	Ruslan Pashtov (on loan to (Russia) Khimik Dzerzhinsk)
28	DF	RUS	Aleksandr Semyachkin (to (Russia) Terek Grozny)
31	GK	RUS	Ilya Abayev (to (Russia) Lokomotiv Moscow)
33	DF	RUS	Nikolai Zaytsev (to (Russia) Alania Vladikavkaz)
41	GK	RUS	Mikhail Kerzhakov (to (Russia) Anzhi Makhachkala)
52	FW	RUS	Mikhail Sorochkin (to (Russia) Angusht Nazran)
63	DF	RUS	Aleksandr Belozyorov (to (Russia) FC Ural Sverdlovsk Oblast)
77	FW	RUS	Aleksandr Salugin (to (Russia) Torpedo Moscow)
80	MF	RUS	Artyom Bragin (to (Russia) Terek Grozny)
83	MF	RUS	Aleksandr Kharitonov (released)
89	MF	RUS	Aleksei Mamonov (to (Russia) Terek Grozny)
99	MF	RUS	Vladimir Torshentsev (to (Russia) Terek-2 Grozny)
—	MF	RUS	Aleksei Pomerko (to (Russia) Shinnik Yaroslavl, previously on loan to (Russia) FC Khimki)

=== Winter ===
In: Note: Flags indicate national team as defined under FIFA eligibility rules; some limited exceptions apply. Players may hold more than one non-FIFA nationality.

No.	Pos.	Nation	Player
7	FW	ARM	Artur Sarkisov (from (Russia) Ural)
17	MF	ARM	Artur Minosyan (from (Russia) Chernomorets)
30	MF	POL	Ariel Borysiuk (loan from (Germany) Kaiserslautern)
44	DF	RUS	Nikita Chicherin (from (Russia) Dynamo Moscow)
80	MF	RUS	Yevgeni Kozlov (from (Russia) Vityaz Podolsk)

Out: Note: Flags indicate national team as defined under FIFA eligibility rules; some limited exceptions apply. Players may hold more than one non-FIFA nationality.

No.	Pos.	Nation	Player
17	FW	CRO	Matija Dvorneković (loan to (Russia) Torpedo Moscow)

== Competitions ==
=== Russian Premier League ===
==== Matches ====
14 July 2013 1	Dynamo Moscow	2 – 2	Volga Nizhny Novgorod	Arena Khimki
13:30 MSK (UTC+4)	Kasaev 28'; Voronin 30'	Summary	Shulenin 2'; Mukendi 3'	Stadium: Moscow; Attendance: 5,604; Referee: Alexey Nikolaev

20 July 2013 2	Volga Nizhny Novgorod	1 – 2	Lokomotiv Moscow	Nizhny Novgorod
18:30 MSK (UTC+4)	Mukendi 67'	Report	Maicon 63'; Shishkin 87'	Stadium: Lokomotiv Stadium; Attendance: 11,500; Referee: Aleksandr Yegorov

27 July 2013 3	Ural	1 – 2	Volga Nizhny Novgorod	Yekaterinburg
16:30 MSK (UTC+4)	Gogniyev 19' (pen.)	Summary	Polczak 58'; Karyaka 80' (pen.)	Stadium: Central Stadium; Attendance: 13,500; Referee: Vyacheslav Kharlamov

3 August 2013 4	Volga Nizhny Novgorod	1 – 3	Zenit St. Petersburg	Nizhny Novgorod
13:30 MSK (UTC+4)	Karyaka 21'	Summary	Danny 19', 80', 89'; Hulk (yellow card) 25' (yellow-red card) 26'	Stadium: Lokomotiv Stadium; Attendance: 13,500; Referee: Evgeny Turbin

19 August 2013 5	Rostov	4 – 0	Volga Nizhny Novgorod	Rostov-on-Don
20:00 MSK (UTC+4)	Ananidze 50'; Kalachev 68'; Dzyuba 75'; Yoo 88'	Summary	Kolodin (yellow card) 55' (yellow-red card) 81'	Stadium: Olimp – 2 Attendance: 13,600; Referee: Sergey Karasev

24 August 2013 6	Volga Nizhny Novgorod	1 – 0	Terek Grozny	Nizhny Novgorod
19:30 MSK (UTC+4)	Putsila 75'	Summary		Stadium: Lokomotiv Stadium; Attendance: 5,100; Referee: Vitali Meshkov

31 August 2013 7	Krasnodar	3 – 0	Volga Nizhny Novgorod	Krasnodar
21:00 MSK (UTC+4)	Wánderson 11', 32'; Joãozinho 44'	Summary	Kowalczyk (yellow card) 30' (yellow-red card) 87'	Stadium: Kuban Stadium; Attendance: 9,500; Referee: Sergey Kuznetsov

14 September 2013 8	Volga Nizhny Novgorod	0 – 1	Spartak Moscow	Nizhny Novgorod
15:45 MSK (UTC+4)		Summary	Movsisyan 32'	Stadium: Lokomotiv Stadium; Attendance: 17,000; Referee: Sergey Lapochkin

22 September 2013 9	Volga Nizhny Novgorod	2 – 1	Anzhi Makhachkala	Nizhny Novgorod
13:30 MSK (UTC+4)	Bibilov 11'; Putsila 21'	Summary	Putsila 22' (o.g.)	Stadium: Lokomotiv Stadium; Attendance: 4,000; Referee: Vladimir Kazmenko

26 September 2013 10	Tom Tomsk	1 – 0	Volga Nizhny Novgorod	Tomsk
19:00 OMST (UTC+7)	Golyshev 56'	Summary	Aldonin (yellow card) 43' (yellow-red card) 45'	Stadium: Trud Stadium; Attendance: 4,100; Referee: Vladimir Seldyakov

29 September 2013 11	Volga Nizhny Novgorod	1 – 0	Kuban Krasnodar	Nizhny Novgorod
15:45 MSK (UTC+4)	Kowalczyk 88'	Summary		Stadium: Lokomotiv Stadium; Attendance: 3,500; Referee: Igor Fedotov

4 October 2013 12	Volga Nizhny Novgorod	0 – 2	Amkar Perm	Lokomotiv Stadium
19:00 MSK (UTC+4)		Summary	Peev 44' (pen.), 56' (pen.)	Stadium: Nizhny Novgorod; Attendance: 3,000; Referee: Aleksei Matyunin

20 October 2013 13	Volga Nizhny Novgorod	2 – 1	Rubin Kazan'	Nizhny Novgorod
20:15 MSK (UTC+4)	Danilenko 11'; Bibilov 49'	Summary	Prudnikov 90+2'	Stadium: Lokomotiv Stadium; Attendance: 5,200; Referee: Aleksey Eskov

25 October 2013 14	Krylia Sovetov	2 – 2	Volga Nizhny Novgorod	Samara
19:00 MSK (UTC+4)	Caballero 10'; Pavlenko 56'	Summary	Bibilov 29'; Danilenko 75'	Stadium: Metallurg Stadium; Attendance: 10,789; Referee: Maxim Layushkin

2 November 2013 15	Volga Nizhny Novgorod	1 – 2	CSKA Moscow	Nizhny Novgorod
13:30 MSK (UTC+4)	Shelton 30'	Summary	Doumbia 34'; Tošić 72'	Stadium: Lokomotiv Stadium; Attendance: 12,000; Referee: Sergey Kuznetsov

10 November 2013 16	Kuban Krasnodar	4 – 0	Volga Nizhny Novgorod	Kuban Stadium
20:15 MSK (UTC+4)	Baldé 12', 64'; Popov 26'; Ignatyev 40'	Summary		Stadium: Krasnodar; Attendance: 7,654; Referee: Sergei Ivanov

24 November 2013 17	Anzhi Makhachkala	0 – 0	Volga Nizhny Novgorod	Kaspiysk
18:30 MSK (UTC+4)		Summary		Stadium: Anzhi-Arena; Attendance: 5,700; Referee: Igor Fedotov

1 December 2013 18	Spartak Moscow	6 – 1	Volga Nizhny Novgorod	Moscow
18:30 MSK (UTC+4)	Jurado 3', 33'; Barrios 45+1'; Özbiliz 50', 77'; Kolodin 84' (o.g.)	Summary	Dvorneković 74'	Stadium: Lokomotiv Stadium; Attendance: 10,875; Referee: Vladislav Bezborodov

7 December 2013 19	Volga Nizhny Novgorod	1 – 2	Krylya Sovetov	Nizhny Novgorod
13:30 MSK (UTC+4)	Kowalczyk 13'	Summary	Caballero 32'; Delkin 89'	Stadium: Lokomotiv Stadium; Attendance: 3,500; Referee: Aleksey Eskov

10 March 2014 20	Amkar Perm	5 – 1	Volga Nizhny Novgorod	Perm
14:00 MSK (UTC+4)	Ogude 4', 79'; Peev 37' (pen.); Kanunnikov 88'; Kowalczyk 89' (pen.)	Summary	Shelton 31'	Stadium: Zvezda Stadium; Attendance: 6,400; Referee: Sergei Ivanov

16 March 2013 21	Rubin Kazan'	3 – 1	Volga Nizhny Novgorod	Kazan
18:00 MSK (UTC+4)	Dević 14'; Torbinski 44'; Mogilevets 80'	Summary	Sarkisov 81'	Stadium: Kazan Arena; Attendance: 4,109; Referee: Aleksandr Egorov

22 March 2014 22	Volga Nizhny Novgorod	0 – 1	Tom Tomsk	Nizhny Novgorod
17:00 OMST (UTC+7)		Summary	Holenda 90+1'	Stadium: Lokomotiv Stadium; Attendance: 4,800; Referee: Sergey Lapochkin

31 March 2014 23	CSKA Moscow	3 – 0	Volga Nizhny Novgorod	Moscow
20:45 MSK (UTC+4)	Tošić 5'; Dzagoev 7'; Dzagoev (red card); Wernbloom 69'	Summary		Stadium: Arena Khimki; Attendance: 4,000; Referee: Vladimir Kazmenko

7 April 2014 24	Lokomotiv Moscow	3 – 0	Volga Nizhny Novgorod	Moscow
19:00 MSK (UTC+3)	Samedov 32' (pen.); Maicon 46'; N'Doye 71'	Report	Polczak (red card) 24'	Stadium: Lokomotiv Stadium; Attendance: 8,110; Referee: Vladislav Bezborodov

14 April 2014 25	Volga Nizhny Novgorod	0 – 5	Dynamo Moscow	Nizhny Novgorod
19:00 MSK (UTC+4)		Summary	Kokorin 53'; Yusupov 75'; Kasaev 76', 90+1'; Samba 84'	Stadium: Lokomotiv Stadium; Attendance: 3,500; Referee: Vitali Meshkov

21 April 2014 26	Volga Nizhny Novgorod	2 – 1	Rostov	Nizhny Novgorod
19:00 MSK (UTC+4)	Polczak 1'; Sarkisov 64'	Summary	Dzyuba 90'	Stadium: Lokomotiv Stadium; Attendance: 3,500; Referee: Vasiliy Kazartsev

26 April 2014 27	Zenit St. Petersburg	2 – 0	Volga Nizhny Novgorod	Saint Petersburg
16:30 MSK (UTC+4)	Witsel 25'; Fayzulin 77'	Summary		Stadium: Petrovsky Stadium; Attendance: 20,027; Referee: Igor Fedotov

2 May 2013 28	Volga Nizhny Novgorod	0 – 1	Krasnodar	Nizhny Novgorod
16:30 MSK (UTC+4)	Sarkisov (yellow card) 63' (yellow-red card) 85'	Summary	Ari 15'	Stadium: Lokomotiv Stadium; Attendance: 2,500; Referee: Timur Arslanbekov

10 May 2014 29	Terek Grozny	2 – 0	Volga Nizhny Novgorod	Grozny
20:00 MSK (UTC+4)	Ivanov 74'; Bokila 90+2'	Summary	Kolodin (red card) 79'	Stadium: Terek Stadium; Attendance: 22,720; Referee: Sergey Lapochkin

15 May 2014 30	Volga Nizhny Novgorod	1 – 2	Ural	Nizhny Novgorod
18:30 MSK (UTC+4)	Sarkisov 81'	Summary	Koman 45+1' (pen.); Sapeta 74'	Stadium: Lokomotiv Stadium; Attendance: 1,950; Referee: Sergey Karasev

==== League table ====
Pos	Team	Pld	W	D	L	GF	GA	GD	Pts	Qualification or relegation
12	Terek Grozny	30	8	9	13	27	33	−6	33	
13	Tom Tomsk (R)	30	8	7	15	23	39	−16	31	Qualification for the Relegation play-offs
14	Krylia Sovetov Samara (R)	30	6	11	13	27	46	−19	29	Qualification for the Relegation play-offs
15	Volga Nizhny Novgorod (R)	30	6	3	21	22	65	−43	21	Relegation to Football National League
16	Anzhi Makhachkala (R)	30	3	11	16	25	42	−17	20	Relegation to Football National League

Source: Russian Premier League
Rules for classification: 1) points; 2) number of wins; 3) head-to-head points; 4) number of head-to-head wins; 5) head-to-head goal difference; 6) number of head-to-head goals scored; 7) number of head-to-head away goals scored; 8) goal difference; 9) number of goals scored; 10) number of away goals scored; 11) position in the 2012–13 season (only used until all the regularly scheduled games have been played); 11) extra play-off game or tournament between the teams in question.
(R) Relegated

=== Russian Cup ===
30 October 2013 Fifth Round	SKA-Energiya Khabarovsk	2 – 0	Volga Nizhny Novgorod	Khabarovsk
08:00 MSK (UTC+4)	Karmazinenko 27', 76'	Summary		Stadium: Lenin Stadium; Attendance: 3,000; Referee: Vyacheslav Popov

== Squad statistics ==
As of match played 15 May 2014

=== Appearances and goals ===
No.	Pos	Nat	Player	Total		Premier League		Russian Cup	
No.	Pos	Nat	Player	Apps	Goals	Apps	Goals	Apps	Goals
1	GK	(Russia) RUS	Artur Nigmatullin	3	0	3	0	0	0
3	DF	(Moldova) MDA	Simeon Bulgaru	15	0	14	0	1	0
4	DF	(Poland) POL	Marcin Kowalczyk	21	2	21	2	0	0
5	MF	(Russia) RUS	Andrei Karyaka	27	2	26+1	2	0	0
6	DF	(Russia) RUS	Dmitri Polyanin	6	0	3+2	0	1	0
7	FW	(Armenia) ARM	Artur Sarkisov	10	3	7+3	3	0	0
8	DF	(Russia) RUS	Denis Kolodin	21	0	21	0	0	0
9	MF	(Russia) RUS	Aleksandr Shulenin	15	1	12+3	1	0	0
10	FW	(Russia) RUS	Dmitri Sychev	16	0	12+4	0	0	0
11	MF	(Russia) RUS	Roman Kontsedalov	23	0	19+4	0	0	0
14	MF	(Belarus) BLR	Anton Putsila	26	2	21+5	2	0	0
15	DF	(Russia) RUS	Andrei Nalyotov	1	0	0	0	1	0
16	MF	(Russia) RUS	Nikita Malyarov	1	0	0	0	1	0
17	MF	(Russia) RUS	Artur Minosyan	9	0	4+5	0	0	0
19	MF	(Romania) ROU	Adrian Ropotan	15	0	8+7	0	0	0
20	MF	(Russia) RUS	Evgeni Aldonin	17	0	17	0	0	0
21	FW	(Jamaica) JAM	Luton Shelton	18	2	13+5	2	0	0
22	FW	(Democratic Republic of the Congo) COD	Mulumba Mukendi	16	2	9+7	2	0	0
23	FW	(Russia) RUS	Dmitri Bulykin	7	0	3+4	0	0	0
24	DF	(Russia) RUS	Aleksei Chubukin	1	0	0	0	0+1	0
26	DF	(Poland) POL	Piotr Polczak	17	2	16+1	2	0	0
27	GK	(Russia) RUS	Mikhail Komarov	6	0	5	0	1	0
28	FW	(Russia) RUS	Ilya Belous	1	0	0	0	1	0
29	MF	(Russia) RUS	Shota Bibilov	16	3	12+4	3	0	0
30	MF	(Poland) POL	Ariel Borysiuk	4	0	2+2	0	0	0
33	DF	(Serbia) SRB	Milan Rodić	10	0	9+1	0	0	0
35	GK	(Estonia) EST	Sergei Pareiko	19	0	19	0	0	0
37	DF	(Moldova) MDA	Vitalie Bordian	9	0	3+5	0	1	0
39	FW	(Russia) RUS	Artyom Danilenko	12	2	7+5	2	0	0
44	DF	(Russia) RUS	Nikita Chicherin	10	0	9+1	0	0	0
77	MF	(Brazil) BRA	Leandro	24	0	23+1	0	0	0
80	MF	(Russia) RUS	Yevgeni Kozlov	1	0	0+1	0	0	0
87	MF	(Russia) RUS	Kirill Zubkov	1	0	0	0	1	0
95	MF	(Russia) RUS	Ilya Petrov	1	0	0	0	1	0
99	MF	(Russia) RUS	Sergei Garanzha	1	0	0	0	1	0
Players away from the club on loan:
17	FW	(Croatia) CRO	Matija Dvorneković	4	1	1+2	1	1	0
Players who appeared for Volga Nizhny Novgorod that left during the season:
31	GK	(Russia) RUS	Ilya Abayev	3	0	3	0	0	0
79	MF	(Russia) RUS	Roman Kuzovkin	1	0	0	0	0+1	0
80	MF	(Russia) RUS	Dmitry Mikhaylenko	1	0	0	0	0+1	0

=== Goal Scorers ===
Place	Position	Nation	Number	Name	Premier League	Russian Cup	Total
1	MF	(Russia)	29	Shota Bibilov	3	0	3
1	FW	(Armenia)	7	Artur Sarkisov	3	0	3
3	FW	(Democratic Republic of the Congo)	22	Mulumba Mukendi	2	0	2
3	MF	(Russia)	5	Andrei Karyaka	2	0	2
3	DF	(Poland)	26	Piotr Polczak	2	0	2
3	MF	(Belarus)	14	Anton Putsila	2	0	2
3	DF	(Poland)	4	Marcin Kowalczyk	2	0	2
3	FW	(Russia)	39	Artyom Danilenko	2	0	2
3	FW	(Jamaica)	21	Luton Shelton	2	0	2
10	MF	(Russia)	9	Aleksandr Shulenin	1	0	1
10	FW	(Croatia)	17	Matija Dvorneković	1	0	1
				TOTALS	22	0	22

=== Clean sheets ===
Place	Position	Nation	Number	Name	Premier League	Russian Cup	Total
1	GK	(Estonia)	35	Sergei Pareiko	2	0	2
2	GK	(Russia)	27	Mikhail Komarov	3	0	3
				TOTALS	3	0	3

=== Disciplinary record ===
Number	Nation	Position	Name	Russian Premier League		Russian Cup		Total	
Number	Nation	Position	Name	Yellow card	Red card	Yellow card	Red card	Yellow card	Red card
3	(Moldova)	DF	Simeon Bulgaru	4	0	0	0	4	0
4	(Poland)	DF	Marcin Kowalczyk	7	1	0	0	7	1
5	(Russia)	DF	Andrei Karyaka	11	0	0	0	11	0
7	(Armenia)	FW	Artur Sarkisov	3	1	0	0	3	1
8	(Russia)	DF	Denis Kolodin	4	2	0	0	4	2
9	(Russia)	MF	Aleksandr Shulenin	4	0	0	0	4	0
10	(Russia)	FW	Dmitri Sychev	2	0	0	0	2	0
11	(Russia)	MF	Roman Kontsedalov	4	0	0	0	4	0
14	(Belarus)	MF	Anton Putsila	6	0	0	0	6	0
17	(Russia)	MF	Artur Minosyan	3	0	0	0	3	0
19	(Romania)	MF	Adrian Ropotan	3	0	0	0	3	0
20	(Russia)	MF	Evgeni Aldonin	6	1	0	0	6	1
21	(Jamaica)	FW	Luton Shelton	1	0	0	0	1	0
22	(Democratic Republic of the Congo)	FW	Mulumba Mukendi	3	0	0	0	3	0
26	(Poland)	DF	Piotr Polczak	5	1	0	0	5	1
27	(Russia)	GK	Mikhail Komarov	0	0	1	0	1	0
28	(Russia)	FW	Ilya Belous	0	0	1	0	1	0
29	(Russia)	MF	Shota Bibilov	3	0	0	0	3	0
33	(Serbia)	DF	Milan Rodić	3	0	0	0	3	0
35	(Estonia)	GK	Sergei Pareiko	2	0	0	0	2	0
37	(Moldova)	DF	Vitalie Bordian	1	0	0	0	1	0
44	(Russia)	DF	Nikita Chicherin	2	0	0	0	2	0
77	(Brazil)	MF	Leandro	2	0	0	0	2	0
Players away on loan:
17	(Croatia)	FW	Matija Dvorneković	0	0	1	0	1	0
Players who left Volga Nizhny Novgorod during the season:
			TOTALS	0	0	3	0	3	0
