= List of Russian football transfers summer 2013 =

This is a list of Russian football transfers in the summer transfer window 2013 by club. Only clubs of the 2013–14 Russian Premier League are included.

== Russian Premier League 2013–14 ==
=== Amkar Perm ===
In: Note: Flags indicate national team as defined under FIFA eligibility rules; some limited exceptions apply. Players may hold more than one non-FIFA nationality.

No.	Pos.	Nation	Player
3	DF	BUL	Petar Zanev (from (Ukraine) Volyn Lutsk)
5	DF	POL	Janusz Gol (from (Poland) Legia Warsaw)
20	MF	RUS	Dmitri Kayumov (on loan from Spartak Moscow)
33	DF	RUS	Nikolai Fadeyev (on loan from Spartak Moscow)
90	MF	RUS	Makhach Gadzhiyev (from (Ukraine) Tavriya Simferopol)
97	DF	FRA	Thomas Phibel (from (Poland) Widzew Łódź)

Out: Note: Flags indicate national team as defined under FIFA eligibility rules; some limited exceptions apply. Players may hold more than one non-FIFA nationality.

No.	Pos.	Nation	Player
2	MF	GRE	Nikolaos Karelis (to (Greece) Panathinaikos)
3	DF	SRB	Nikola Mijailović (to (Serbia) Red Star)
5	MF	RUS	Vitali Grishin (to Khimki)
15	MF	SRB	Predrag Mijić (released)
18	FW	RUS	Nikita Burmistrov (end of loan from Anzhi Makhachkala)
27	MF	RUS	Vadim Gagloyev (to Mordovia Saransk)
50	DF	RUS	Mikhail Smirnov (on loan to Neftekhimik Nizhnekamsk)
60	FW	RUS	Pavel Shuvalov (to Spartak Kostroma)
63	FW	RUS	Stanislav Matyash (to Dynamo St. Petersburg)
73	DF	RUS	Brian Idowu (to Dynamo St. Petersburg)
94	DF	RUS	Anton Smetanin (to Oktan Perm)

=== Anzhi Makhachkala ===
In: Note: Flags indicate national team as defined under FIFA eligibility rules; some limited exceptions apply. Players may hold more than one non-FIFA nationality.

No.	Pos.	Nation	Player
4	DF	CMR	Benoît Angbwa (from Krylia Sovetov Samara)
5	DF	GEO	Gia Grigalava (from Volga Nizhny Novgorod)
6	DF	MDA	Alexandru Epureanu (on loan from Dynamo Moscow)
10	MF	RUS	Alan Gatagov (on loan from Dynamo Moscow)
14	FW	RUS	Pavel Solomatin (on loan from Dynamo Moscow)
15	DF	NOR	Vadim Demidov (from (Germany) Eintracht Frankfurt)
16	MF	ARM	Karlen Mkrtchyan (from (Ukraine) Metalurh Donetsk)
20	MF	RUS	Vladimir Sobolev (on loan from Dynamo Moscow)
22	GK	RUS	Mikhail Kerzhakov (from Volga Nizhny Novgorod)
24	DF	NGA	Dele Adeleye (from Kuban Krasnodar)
29	MF	CIV	Abdul Razak (on loan from (England) Manchester City)
84	MF	RUS	Sandro Chelidze
87	MF	RUS	Ilya Maksimov (from Krylia Sovetov Samara)

Out: Note: Flags indicate national team as defined under FIFA eligibility rules; some limited exceptions apply. Players may hold more than one non-FIFA nationality.

No.	Pos.	Nation	Player
1	GK	RUS	Vladimir Gabulov (to Dynamo Moscow)
5	DF	BRA	João Carlos (to Spartak Moscow)
6	MF	MAR	Mbark Boussoufa (to Lokomotiv Moscow)
9	FW	CMR	Samuel Eto'o (to (England) Chelsea)
10	MF	BRA	Willian (to (England) Chelsea)
14	MF	RUS	Oleg Shatov (to Zenit St. Petersburg)
15	DF	RUS	Arseniy Logashov (to Lokomotiv Moscow)
18	MF	RUS	Yuri Zhirkov (to Dynamo Moscow)
20	FW	RUS	Fyodor Smolov (end of loan from Dynamo Moscow)
32	FW	RUS	Shamil Mirzayev (to Dagdizel Kaspiysk)
33	DF	BIH	Emir Spahić (end of loan from (Spain) Sevilla)
33	MF	MAR	Mehdi Carcela (to (Belgium) Standard Liège)
56	DF	RUS	Dzhamal Rasulov (to Nosta Novotroitsk)
85	MF	FRA	Lassana Diarra (to Lokomotiv Moscow)

=== CSKA Moscow ===
In: Note: Flags indicate national team as defined under FIFA eligibility rules; some limited exceptions apply. Players may hold more than one non-FIFA nationality.

No.	Pos.	Nation	Player
8	MF	SUI	Steven Zuber (from (Switzerland) Grasshoppers)
23	MF	BUL	Georgi Milanov (from (Bulgaria) Litex Lovech)
31	FW	BRA	Vitinho (from (Brazil) Botafogo)
54	DF	BIH	Ermin Imamović (from Lokomotiv Moscow school)

Out: Note: Flags indicate national team as defined under FIFA eligibility rules; some limited exceptions apply. Players may hold more than one non-FIFA nationality.

No.	Pos.	Nation	Player
9	FW	BRA	Vágner Love (to (China) Shandong Luneng)
17	MF	RUS	Pavel Mamayev (on loan to FC Krasnodar)
36	MF	RUS	Yegor Ivanov (on loan to Yenisey Krasnoyarsk)
38	GK	RUS	Vyacheslav Isupov (on loan to Lokomotiv-2 Moscow)
52	MF	RUS	Ravil Netfullin (on loan to Fakel Voronezh)
77	DF	RUS	Pavel Drozdov (to Strogino Moscow)
80	MF	RUS	David Khurtsidze (on loan to Zenit Penza)
89	FW	CZE	Tomáš Necid (on loan to (Greece) PAOK)
92	DF	RUS	Pyotr Ten (on loan to Rotor Volgograd)
93	MF	RUS	Gela Zaseyev (to Alania Vladikavkaz)
—	GK	RUS	Artur Nigmatullin (to Volga Nizhny Novgorod, previously on loan)
—	DF	SRB	Uroš Ćosić (to (Italy) Pescara, previously on loan)
—	DF	RUS	Semyon Fedotov (to Lokomotiv-2 Moscow, previously on loan)
—	DF	RUS	Andrei Vasyanovich (to Rotor Volgograd, previously on loan)
—	MF	RUS	Evgeni Aldonin (to Volga Nizhny Novgorod, previously on loan to Mordovia Saransk)
—	MF	RUS	Artyom Popov (to Lokomotiv-2 Moscow, previously on loan)
—	MF	RUS	Aleksandr Vasilyev (to FC Rostov, previously on loan to Ufa)

=== Dynamo Moscow ===
In: Note: Flags indicate national team as defined under FIFA eligibility rules; some limited exceptions apply. Players may hold more than one non-FIFA nationality.

No.	Pos.	Nation	Player
3	MF	RUS	Yuri Zhirkov (from Anzhi Makhachkala)
4	DF	BLR	Igor Shitov (end of loan to Mordovia Saransk)
5	DF	NED	Douglas (from (Netherlands) Twente)
9	FW	RUS	Fyodor Smolov (end of loan to Anzhi Makhachkala)
10	FW	UKR	Andriy Voronin (end of loan to (Germany) Fortuna Düsseldorf)
11	MF	RUS	Alan Kasaev (on loan from Rubin Kazan)
21	MF	ROU	George Florescu (from (Romania) Astra Giurgiu)
25	FW	RUS	Vladimir Dyadyun (from Rubin Kazan)
27	MF	RUS	Igor Denisov (from Zenit St. Petersburg)
29	DF	FIN	Boris Rotenberg (end of loan to (Cyprus) Olympiakos Nicosia)
55	GK	RUS	Vladimir Gabulov (from Anzhi Makhachkala)
56	MF	RUS	Vladimir Sobolev (end of loan to FC Khimki)
72	DF	RUS	Aleksandr Kalyashin (from Akademiya Togliatti)
84	DF	CGO	Christopher Samba (from (England) Queens Park Rangers)
93	FW	RUS	Andrei Panyukov (end of loan to FC Khimki)
99	MF	RUS	Aleksei Ionov (from Kuban Krasnodar)

Out: Note: Flags indicate national team as defined under FIFA eligibility rules; some limited exceptions apply. Players may hold more than one non-FIFA nationality.

No.	Pos.	Nation	Player
8	FW	RUS	Sergei Davydov (end of loan from Rubin Kazan)
10	MF	RUS	Igor Semshov (to Krylia Sovetov Samara)
11	MF	RUS	Pavel Ignatovich (on loan to Tom Tomsk)
14	FW	RUS	Pavel Solomatin (on loan to Anzhi Makhachkala)
15	DF	MDA	Alexandru Epureanu (on loan to Anzhi Makhachkala)
17	MF	RUS	Alan Gatagov (on loan to Anzhi Makhachkala)
21	MF	AUT	Jakob Jantscher (end of loan from (Austria) Red Bull Salzburg)
25	DF	RUS	Denis Kolodin (to Volga Nizhny Novgorod)
28	MF	NED	Otman Bakkal (released)
31	GK	RUS	Yevgeni Puzin (to Sibir Novosibirsk)
33	DF	RUS	Vladimir Rykov (on loan to Tom Tomsk)
41	MF	RUS	Aleksandr Sapeta (on loan to Ural Sverdlovsk Oblast)
42	MF	RUS	Yuri Kirillov (to Ural Sverdlovsk Oblast)
56	MF	RUS	Vladimir Sobolev (on loan to Anzhi Makhachkala)
70	MF	RUS	Roman Yeremeyev (to Volgar Astrakhan)
90	MF	RUS	Ivan Solovyov (to Zenit Saint Petersburg)
—	DF	RUS	Vladimir Kisenkov (to Tom Tomsk, previously on loan to Rostov)
—	DF	CRO	Gordon Schildenfeld (on loan to (Greece) Panathinaikos, previously on loan to (Greece) PAOK)
—	MF	CRO	Tomislav Dujmović (to (Croatia) RNK Split, previously on loan to Mordovia Saransk)
—	MF	UKR	Borys Tashchy (on loan to (Ukraine) Hoverla Uzhhorod, previously on loan to (Ukraine) Chornomorets Odesa)

=== Krasnodar ===
In: Note: Flags indicate national team as defined under FIFA eligibility rules; some limited exceptions apply. Players may hold more than one non-FIFA nationality.

No.	Pos.	Nation	Player
1	GK	RUS	Artyom Leonov (from Akademiya Tolyatti)
5	DF	POL	Artur Jędrzejczyk (from (Poland) Legia Warsaw)
6	DF	SWE	Andreas Granqvist (from (Italy) Genoa)
7	MF	RUS	Pavel Mamayev (on loan from CSKA Moscow)
8	MF	RUS	Yuri Gazinskiy (from Torpedo Moscow)
9	FW	BRA	Ari (from Spartak Moscow)
10	MF	ARM	Marcos Pizzelli (from Kuban Krasnodar)
17	DF	RUS	Vitali Kaleshin (from Rubin Kazan)
21	MF	COL	Ricardo Laborde (from (Cyprus) Anorthosis Famagusta)
23	GK	RUS	Aleksandr Filtsov (from Lokomotiv Moscow)
29	FW	CIV	Gerard Gohou (from (Turkey) Kayseri Erciyesspor)
87	FW	RUS	Ruslan Bolov (from Spartak Nalchik)

Out: Note: Flags indicate national team as defined under FIFA eligibility rules; some limited exceptions apply. Players may hold more than one non-FIFA nationality.

No.	Pos.	Nation	Player
1	GK	GEO	Nukri Revishvili (to (Georgia (country)) FC Dila Gori)
7	MF	RUS	Vladislav Ignatyev (to Kuban Krasnodar)
11	FW	SEN	Moussa Konaté (on loan to (Italy) Genoa)
16	GK	RUS	Yevgeni Gorodov (to Terek Grozny)
18	MF	MNE	Nikola Drinčić (released)
20	MF	RUS	Igor Lambarschi (on loan to Yenisey Krasnoyarsk)
28	DF	RUS	Igor Smolnikov (to Zenit St. Petersburg)
36	DF	CMR	Adolphe Teikeu (end of loan from (Ukraine) Metalurh Zaporizhzhia)
40	MF	RUS	Igor Yermakov (to Energiya Volzhsky)
45	MF	RUS	Marat Garipov (to Olimpia Volgograd)
77	MF	HUN	Vladimir Koman (on loan to Ural Sverdlovsk Oblast)
—	MF	MDA	Valeriu Ciupercă (on loan to Krasnodar-2, previously on loan to (Moldova) Academia Chișinău)
—	MF	RUS	Aleksandr Yerokhin (to FC SKA-Energiya Khabarovsk, previously on loan)

=== Krylia Sovetov Samara ===
In: Note: Flags indicate national team as defined under FIFA eligibility rules; some limited exceptions apply. Players may hold more than one non-FIFA nationality.

No.	Pos.	Nation	Player
3	DF	BRA	Nadson (from (Belgium) Genk)
10	FW	PAR	Pablo Zeballos (end of loan to (Ecuador) Emelec)
11	MF	RUS	Aleksandr Pavlenko (from Terek Grozny)
20	MF	RUS	Igor Semshov (from Dynamo Moscow)
21	MF	RUS	Ruslan Adzhindzhal (from Volga Nizhny Novgorod)
28	DF	GER	Felicio Brown Forbes (from (Germany) FSV Frankfurt)
99	GK	SVK	Ján Mucha (from (England) Everton)

Out: Note: Flags indicate national team as defined under FIFA eligibility rules; some limited exceptions apply. Players may hold more than one non-FIFA nationality.

No.	Pos.	Nation	Player
11	MF	RUS	Roman Grigoryan (to Vityaz Podolsk)
14	FW	RUS	Igor Portnyagin (end of loan from Rubin Kazan)
19	DF	CMR	Benoît Angbwa (to Anzhi Makhachkala)
21	DF	RUS	Dmitri Golubev (on loan to Mordovia Saransk)
30	GK	RUS	Oleg Baklov (to Syzran-2003 Syzran)
38	DF	RUS	Stanislav Bravin (to Tekstilshchik Ivanovo)
51	MF	RUS	Viktor Svezhov (on loan to Torpedo Moscow)
71	GK	RUS	Aleksei Kozlov (on loan to Kaluga)
74	MF	RUS	Sergei Nakhlyostkin (to Sibir-2 Novosibirsk)
83	DF	FRA	Steeve Joseph-Reinette (end of contract)
87	MF	RUS	Ilya Maksimov (to Anzhi Makhachkala)
93	MF	RUS	Artyom Bykov (to Lada-Togliatti Togliatti)
—	GK	ALG	Raïs M'Bolhi (to (Bulgaria) CSKA Sofia, previously on loan to (France) Gazélec Ajaccio)

=== Kuban Krasnodar ===
In: Note: Flags indicate national team as defined under FIFA eligibility rules; some limited exceptions apply. Players may hold more than one non-FIFA nationality.

No.	Pos.	Nation	Player
9	MF	RUS	Vladislav Ignatyev (from FC Krasnodar)
13	FW	FRA	Djibril Cissé (from (England) Queens Park Rangers)
14	MF	RUS	Nikita Bezlikhotnov (from Torpedo Moscow)
20	FW	URU	Gonzalo Bueno (from (Uruguay) Nacional)
21	MF	GHA	Mohammed Rabiu (from (France) Evian)
28	DF	PAR	Lorenzo Melgarejo (from (Portugal) Benfica)
90	MF	RUS	Arsen Khubulov (from Alania Vladikavkaz)
—	MF	RUS	Igor Paderin (end of loan to Tyumen)
—	MF	RUS	Anton Sekret (end of loan to (Belarus) Torpedo-BelAZ Zhodino)

Out: Note: Flags indicate national team as defined under FIFA eligibility rules; some limited exceptions apply. Players may hold more than one non-FIFA nationality.

No.	Pos.	Nation	Player
3	DF	NGA	Dele Adeleye (to Anzhi Makhachkala)
7	MF	RUS	Vladislav Kulik (to Rubin Kazan)
9	MF	RUS	Nikolai Zhilyayev (to FC Ufa)
10	MF	RUS	Aleksei Ionov (to Dynamo Moscow)
14	MF	RUS	Nikita Bezlikhotnov (on loan to (Ukraine) Metalurh Donetsk)
20	FW	ROU	Daniel Niculae (to (Belgium) Gent)
24	MF	ARM	Aras Özbiliz (to Spartak Moscow)
27	DF	CIV	Igor Lolo (to Rostov)
30	MF	ARM	Marcos Pizzelli (to FC Krasnodar)
31	DF	BRA	Leandro (end of loan from (Ukraine) Arsenal Kyiv)
32	MF	KAZ	Baurzhan Islamkhan (on loan to (Kazakhstan) Astana)
74	MF	RUS	Bunyamudin Mustafayev (to Torpedo Armavir)
78	GK	RUS	Maksim Shvagirev (to Torpedo Armavir)
80	MF	RUS	Ruslan Gomleshko (to Torpedo Armavir)
81	FW	RUS	Kirill Romanets (to Vityaz Krymsk)
89	GK	RUS	Dmitri Zaytsev (to Torpedo Armavir)
91	FW	RUS	Yevgeni Kasyanov (to Torpedo Armavir)
94	DF	RUS	Aleksandr Kaglyuk (to Torpedo Armavir)
96	MF	RUS	Maksim Malysh (to Torpedo Armavir)
—	DF	RUS	Sergei Bendz (released, previously on loan to Tom Tomsk)
—	MF	RUS	Mikhail Komkov (on loan to Tom Tomsk, previously on loan at (Russia) Khimki)

=== Lokomotiv Moscow ===
In: Note: Flags indicate national team as defined under FIFA eligibility rules; some limited exceptions apply. Players may hold more than one non-FIFA nationality.

No.	Pos.	Nation	Player
11	MF	MAR	Mbark Boussoufa (from Anzhi Makhachkala)
17	DF	UKR	Taras Mykhalyk (from (Ukraine) Dynamo Kyiv)
24	DF	RUS	Andrei Ivanov (end of loan to FC Rostov)
51	DF	RUS	Maksim Belyayev (end of loan to FC Rostov)
77	MF	RUS	Sergei Tkachyov (from (Ukraine) Metalist Kharkiv)
81	GK	RUS	Ilya Abayev (from Volga Nizhny Novgorod)
85	MF	FRA	Lassana Diarra (from Anzhi Makhachkala)
—	DF	RUS	Arseniy Logashov (from Anzhi Makhachkala)
—	MF	RUS	Alan Chochiyev (end of loan to Volgar Astrakhan)

Out: Note: Flags indicate national team as defined under FIFA eligibility rules; some limited exceptions apply. Players may hold more than one non-FIFA nationality.

No.	Pos.	Nation	Player
8	MF	RUS	Denis Glushakov (to Spartak Moscow)
10	MF	RUS	Dmitri Loskov (contract expired)
21	MF	RUS	Dmitri Torbinski (to Rubin Kazan)
43	DF	RUS	Aleksandr Yarkovoy (to Khimki)
48	DF	RUS	Sandro Tsveiba (to Rus St. Petersburg)
58	MF	RUS	Aleksandr Zakuskin (to Lokomotiv-2 Moscow)
78	MF	RUS	Nikolai Kalinskiy (to Kaluga)
81	MF	RUS	Danila Polyakov (to Strogino Moscow)
88	MF	RUS	Dmitry Mikhaylenko (to Volga Nizhny Novgorod)
92	MF	RUS	Nikita Dubchak (to Lokomotiv-2 Moscow)
—	GK	BLR	Anton Amelchenko (to FC Rostov, previously on loan at Terek Grozny)
—	GK	RUS	Aleksandr Filtsov (to FC Krasnodar, previously on loan)
—	DF	POR	Manuel da Costa (to (Turkey) Sivasspor, previously on loan to (Portugal) Nacional)
—	DF	RUS	Igor Golban (on loan to Shinnik Yaroslavl, previously on loan to (Czech Republic) Sigma Olomouc)
—	DF	RUS	Arseniy Logashov (on loan to FC Rostov)
—	MF	RUS	Semyon Fomin (to Rotor Volgograd, previously on loan)
—	MF	BIH	Senijad Ibričić (to (Turkey) Kayseri Erciyesspor, previously on loan to (Turkey) Kasımpaşa)
—	FW	ARM	Artur Sarkisov (to Ural Sverdlovsk Oblast, previously on loan at (Russia) Volga Nizhny Novgorod)
—	FW	RUS	Dmitri Sychev (on loan to Volga Nizhny Novgorod, previously on loan to (Belarus) Dinamo Minsk)

=== Rostov ===
In: Note: Flags indicate national team as defined under FIFA eligibility rules; some limited exceptions apply. Players may hold more than one non-FIFA nationality.

No.	Pos.	Nation	Player
8	MF	UKR	Ihor Khudobyak (on loan from (Ukraine) Karpaty Lviv)
10	FW	RUS	Artyom Dzyuba (on loan from Spartak Moscow)
11	FW	KOR	Yoo Byung-Soo (from (Saudi Arabia) Al-Hilal)
15	DF	ANG	Bastos (from (Angola) Petro de Luanda)
16	GK	BLR	Anton Amelchenko (from Lokomotiv Moscow)
17	MF	RUS	Aleksandr Vasilyev (from CSKA Moscow)
18	MF	RUS	Azim Fatullayev (from Yenisey Krasnoyarsk)
19	DF	CRO	Hrvoje Milić (from (Croatia) Istra 1961)
25	DF	RUS	Arseniy Logashov (on loan from Lokomotiv Moscow)
27	DF	CIV	Igor Lolo (from Kuban Krasnodar)
31	GK	RUS	Nikita Chagrov (from Torpedo Moscow)
49	MF	GEO	Jano Ananidze (on loan from Spartak Moscow)
56	MF	RUS	Vladislav Kamilov (from Dynamo Barnaul)

Out: Note: Flags indicate national team as defined under FIFA eligibility rules; some limited exceptions apply. Players may hold more than one non-FIFA nationality.

No.	Pos.	Nation	Player
3	DF	SVK	Kornel Saláta (on loan to Tom Tomsk)
4	DF	NGA	Isaac Okoronkwo (end of contract)
6	MF	RUS	Nikita Vasilyev (on loan to Torpedo Moscow)
8	MF	RUS	Dmitri Malyaka (to Angusht Nazran)
10	FW	RUS	Dmitri Kirichenko (to Mordovia Saransk)
16	DF	EST	Dmitri Kruglov (to (Estonia) Levadia Tallinn)
18	DF	RUS	Vladimir Kisenkov (end of loan from Dynamo Moscow)
20	MF	RUS	Sergey Belousov (on loan to Shinnik Yaroslavl)
21	MF	RUS	Khoren Bayramyan (on loan to Rotor Volgograd)
22	DF	RUS	Andrei Ivanov (end of loan from Lokomotiv Moscow)
25	GK	RUS	Nikolai Zabolotny (end of loan from Spartak Moscow)
29	DF	RUS	Andrei Vasilyev (on loan to Dynamo St. Petersburg)
30	DF	RUS	Maksim Belyayev (end of loan from Lokomotiv Moscow)
33	DF	RUS	Inal Getigezhev (to Rubin Kazan)
36	MF	RUS	Aleksei Tkach (to Taganrog)
57	MF	RUS	Veniamin Mednikov (to Volga Ulyanovsk)
59	MF	RUS	Artyom Eskov (to Gazprom transgaz Stavropol Ryzdvyany)
66	DF	RUS	Igor Gubanov (to SKVO Rostov-on-Don)
69	FW	CZE	Jan Holenda (on loan to Tom Tomsk)
70	MF	RUS	Magomed Kurbanov (to Taganrog)
77	FW	SRB	Danko Lazović (end of loan from Zenit Saint Petersburg)
87	FW	USA	Eugene Starikov (end of loan from Zenit Saint Petersburg)
—	FW	RUS	Dmitri Kukharchuk (released, previously on loan to Spartak Kostroma)

=== Rubin Kazan ===
In: Note: Flags indicate national team as defined under FIFA eligibility rules; some limited exceptions apply. Players may hold more than one non-FIFA nationality.

No.	Pos.	Nation	Player
7	MF	RUS	Vladislav Kulik (from Kuban Krasnodar)
9	FW	RUS	Aleksandr Prudnikov (from Alania Vladikavkaz)
10	MF	RUS	Dmitri Torbinski (from Lokomotiv Moscow)
22	DF	FRA	Chris Mavinga (from (France) Rennes)
33	DF	RUS	Inal Getigezhev (from Rostov)
52	DF	RUS	Konstantin Vasilyev (end of loan to Rubin-2 Kazan)
63	MF	RUS	Alisher Dzhalilov (end of loan to Neftekhimik Nizhnekamsk)
81	FW	RUS	Ruslan Mukhametshin (from Mordovia)
—	DF	RUS	Iskandar Dzhalilov (end of loan to (Romania) Turnu Severin)
—	MF	GHA	Wakaso (from (Spain) Espanyol)

Out: Note: Flags indicate national team as defined under FIFA eligibility rules; some limited exceptions apply. Players may hold more than one non-FIFA nationality.

No.	Pos.	Nation	Player
3	DF	ARG	Cristian Ansaldi (to Zenit St. Petersburg)
6	MF	ESP	Pablo Orbaiz (retired)
10	MF	RUS	Alan Kasaev (on loan to Dynamo Moscow)
19	DF	RUS	Vitali Kaleshin (to FC Krasnodar)
20	MF	FIN	Alexei Eremenko (to (Kazakhstan) Kairat)
22	FW	RUS	Vladimir Dyadyun (to Dynamo Moscow)
35	DF	RUS	Ivan Temnikov (on loan to Terek Grozny)
55	MF	TUR	Gökhan Töre (on loan to (Turkey) Beşiktaş)
70	DF	RUS	Yevgeni Kozlov (end of loan from Vityaz Podolsk)
71	DF	RUS	Aleksei Pashchenko (to Rubin-2 Kazan)
88	GK	IRN	Alireza Haghighi (on loan to (Iran) Persepolis)
—	DF	RUS	Viktor Garayev (to Rubin-2 Kazan, previously on loan)
—	DF	RUS	Aleksandr Kulikov (to Luch-Energiya Vladivostok, previously on loan to Neftekhimik Nizhnekamsk)
—	DF	RUS	Maksim Zhestokov (to Neftekhimik Nizhnekamsk, previously on loan to Volgar Astrakhan)
—	MF	RUS	Nikita Khromykh (to Rubin-2 Kazan, previously on loan)
—	FW	MDA	Alexandru Antoniuc (on loan to (Moldova) Veris, previously on loan to (Moldova) Zimbru Chișinău)
—	FW	RUS	Sergei Davydov (on loan to (Kazakhstan) Aktobe, previously on loan to Dynamo Moscow)
—	FW	UZB	Ayubkhon Gapparov (to (Uzbekistan) Navbahor Namangan, previously on loan to Neftekhimik Nizhnekamsk)
—	FW	RUS	Igor Portnyagin (on loan to Tom Tomsk, previously on loan to Krylia Sovetov Samara)

=== Spartak Moscow ===
In: Note: Flags indicate national team as defined under FIFA eligibility rules; some limited exceptions apply. Players may hold more than one non-FIFA nationality.

No.	Pos.	Nation	Player
1	GK	RUS	Nikolai Zabolotny (end of loan to FC Rostov)
5	MF	ARG	Tino Costa (from (Spain) Valencia)
9	FW	PAR	Lucas Barrios (from (China) Guangzhou Evergrande)
11	MF	ARM	Aras Özbiliz (from Kuban Krasnodar)
19	MF	ESP	José Manuel Jurado (from (Germany) Schalke 04, previously on loan)
26	DF	RUS	Anton Khodyrev (end of loan to Sibir Novosibirsk)
27	GK	RUS	Soslan Dzhanayev (end of loan to Alania Vladikavkaz)
35	DF	GER	Serdar Tasci (from (Germany) VfB Stuttgart)
41	FW	RUS	Vladimir Obukhov (end of loan to Torpedo Moscow)
50	MF	RUS	Aleksandr Manyukov (from Arsenal Tula)
55	DF	BRA	João Carlos (from Anzhi Makhachkala)
88	MF	RUS	Denis Glushakov (from Lokomotiv Moscow)
—	MF	CRO	Filip Ozobić (end of loan to (Croatia) Hajduk Split)

Out: Note: Flags indicate national team as defined under FIFA eligibility rules; some limited exceptions apply. Players may hold more than one non-FIFA nationality.

No.	Pos.	Nation	Player
5	DF	ARG	Nicolás Pareja (on loan to (Spain) Sevilla)
9	FW	BRA	Ari (to FC Krasnodar)
10	FW	RUS	Artyom Dzyuba (on loan to FC Rostov)
29	FW	NGA	Emmanuel Emenike (to (Turkey) Fenerbahçe)
49	MF	GEO	Jano Ananidze (on loan to FC Rostov)
51	MF	RUS	Dmitri Kayumov (on loan to Amkar Perm)
54	FW	RUS	Ilnur Alshin (to Fakel Voronezh)
55	DF	RUS	Nikolai Fadeyev (on loan to Amkar Perm)
90	MF	CRO	Ognjen Vukojević (end of loan from (Ukraine) Dynamo Kyiv)
94	MF	ARM	Aghvan Papikyan (end of loan from (Poland) ŁKS Łódź)
—	MF	NED	Demy de Zeeuw (to (Belgium) Anderlecht, previously on loan)
—	MF	RUS	Aleksandr Zotov (on loan to Shinnik Yaroslavl, previously on loan to Tom Tomsk)
—	FW	BLR	Dmitri Khlebosolov (to (Belarus) Gomel, previously on loan to (Germany) Dynamo Dresden)
—	FW	BRA	Welliton (on loan to (Brazil) São Paulo, previously on loan to (Brazil) Grêmio)

=== Terek Grozny ===
In: Note: Flags indicate national team as defined under FIFA eligibility rules; some limited exceptions apply. Players may hold more than one non-FIFA nationality.

No.	Pos.	Nation	Player
11	FW	RUS	Zaur Sadayev (end of loan to (Israel) Beitar Jerusalem)
14	DF	MAR	Ismaïl Aissati (from (Turkey) Antalyaspor)
15	DF	BLR	Artsyom Radzkow (from (Belarus) BATE Borisov)
16	GK	RUS	Yevgeni Gorodov (from FC Krasnodar)
17	DF	RUS	Ivan Temnikov (on loan from Rubin Kazan)
18	FW	COD	Jeremy Bokila (from (Romania) Petrolul Ploiești)
30	FW	ROU	Gheorghe Grozav (from (Romania) Petrolul Ploiești)
44	DF	RUS	Dzhabrail Kadiyev (end of loan to (Israel) Beitar Jerusalem)
51	GK	RUS	Yevgeni Kobozev (from FC Ufa)
82	DF	RUS	Aleksei Mamonov (from Volga Nizhny Novgorod)
83	DF	RUS	Aleksandr Semyachkin (from Volga Nizhny Novgorod)
84	MF	RUS	Artyom Bragin (from Volga Nizhny Novgorod)

Out: Note: Flags indicate national team as defined under FIFA eligibility rules; some limited exceptions apply. Players may hold more than one non-FIFA nationality.

No.	Pos.	Nation	Player
10	MF	RUS	Adlan Katsayev (to Luch-Energiya Vladivostok)
15	MF	RUS	Aleksandr Pavlenko (to Krylia Sovetov Samara)
21	MF	RUS	Oleg Vlasov (to Torpedo Moscow)
25	DF	CZE	Martin Jiránek (to Tom Tomsk)
57	FW	RUS	Abdul-Khakim Matayev (to Chernomorets Novorossiysk)
85	GK	BLR	Anton Amelchenko (end of loan from Lokomotiv Moscow)
—	DF	POL	Piotr Polczak (to Volga Nizhny Novgorod, previously on loan)

=== Tom Tomsk ===
In: Note: Flags indicate national team as defined under FIFA eligibility rules; some limited exceptions apply. Players may hold more than one non-FIFA nationality.

No.	Pos.	Nation	Player
1	GK	MNE	Mladen Božović (from (Hungary) Videoton)
4	MF	RUS	Yevgeni Bashkirov (from Zenit St. Petersburg, previously on loan)
6	MF	ROU	Gabriel Mureșan (from (Romania) CFR Cluj)
9	FW	RUS	Igor Portnyagin (on loan from Rubin Kazan)
11	MF	RUS	Pavel Ignatovich (on loan from Dynamo Moscow)
15	DF	RUS	Vladimir Kisenkov (from Dynamo Moscow)
17	FW	USA	Eugene Starikov (on loan from Zenit St. Petersburg)
19	MF	RUS	Maksim Astafyev (from Sibir Novosibirsk)
20	DF	BUL	Zhivko Milanov (from (Romania) Vaslui)
21	DF	BLR	Maksim Bardachow (on loan from (Belarus) BATE)
30	DF	SVK	Kornel Saláta (on loan from FC Rostov)
33	DF	RUS	Vladimir Rykov (on loan from Dynamo Moscow)
37	MF	RUS	Mikhail Komkov (on loan from Kuban Krasnodar)
52	DF	CZE	Martin Jiránek (from Terek Grozny)
77	MF	HUN	Ádám Pintér (from (Spain) Zaragoza)
88	FW	RUS	Kirill Panchenko (from Mordovia Saransk)
89	MF	MDA	Eugen Sidorenco (from (Israel) Hapoel Nazareth Illit)
—	FW	CZE	Jan Holenda (on loan from FC Rostov)

Out: Note: Flags indicate national team as defined under FIFA eligibility rules; some limited exceptions apply. Players may hold more than one non-FIFA nationality.

No.	Pos.	Nation	Player
1	GK	RUS	Vitali Astakhov (to Gazovik Orenburg)
2	MF	RUS	Aleksandr Dimidko (to Mordovia Saransk)
6	MF	RUS	Aleksandr Zotov (end of loan from Spartak Moscow)
11	MF	RUS	Andrei Gorbanets (to Ural Sverdlovsk Oblast)
15	MF	RUS	Ivan Nagibin (to FC Ufa)
20	FW	RUS	Aleksei Sazonov (to Syzran-2003 Syzran)
24	DF	RUS	Sergei Bendz (end of loan from Kuban Krasnodar)
25	FW	RUS	Anton Khazov (to Gazovik Orenburg)
26	DF	RUS	Viktor Stroyev (to Fakel Voronezh)
27	FW	RUS	Kirill Pogrebnyak (on loan to Fakel Voronezh)
58	DF	RUS	Ilya Zuyev (end of loan from Zenit St. Petersburg)
89	FW	UKR	Oleksandr Kasyan (end of loan from (Ukraine) Karpaty Lviv)
—	GK	RUS	Daniil Gavilovskiy (to Khimik Dzerzhinsk, previously on loan)
—	DF	RUS	Mikhail Bashilov (on loan to Tyumen, previously on loan to Irtysh Omsk)
—	DF	RUS	Yaroslav Ovsyannikov (on loan to FC Volga Ulyanovsk, previously on loan to Sibiryak Bratsk)
—	MF	RUS	Yevgeni Chernov (on loan to Khimik Dzerzhinsk, previously on loan to Gazovik Orenburg)

=== Ural Sverdlovsk Oblast ===
In: Note: Flags indicate national team as defined under FIFA eligibility rules; some limited exceptions apply. Players may hold more than one non-FIFA nationality.

No.	Pos.	Nation	Player
1	GK	RUS	Aleksei Solosin (from SKA-Energiya Khabarovsk)
6	DF	ISL	Sölvi Ottesen (from (Denmark) Copenhagen)
17	MF	RUS	Andrei Gorbanets (from Tom Tomsk)
18	FW	ISR	Toto Tamuz (from (Israel) Hapoel Tel Aviv)
24	MF	RUS	Yuri Kirillov (from Dynamo Moscow)
41	MF	RUS	Aleksandr Sapeta (on loan from Dynamo Moscow)
63	DF	RUS	Aleksandr Belozyorov (from Volga Nizhny Novgorod)
69	FW	ARM	Artur Sarkisov (from Lokomotiv Moscow)
78	MF	HUN	Vladimir Koman (on loan from FC Krasnodar)
89	MF	RUS	Aleksandr Yerokhin (on loan from SKA-Energiya Khabarovsk)
—	GK	RUS	Grigori Lyubimov (end of loan to Oktan Perm)
—	DF	RUS	Vyacheslav Bluzhin (end of loan to Oktan Perm)
—	MF	GEO	Lasha Gvalia (from (Georgia (country)) Dila Gori)

Out: Note: Flags indicate national team as defined under FIFA eligibility rules; some limited exceptions apply. Players may hold more than one non-FIFA nationality.

No.	Pos.	Nation	Player
1	GK	RUS	Aleksandr Kotlyarov (to Luch-Energiya Vladivostok)
3	MF	RUS	Ivan Melnik (on loan to Dynamo St. Petersburg)
6	DF	RUS	Ivan Drannikov (to Neftekhimik Nizhnekamsk)
18	MF	SRB	Branimir Petrović (to (Belgium) Kortrijk)
22	FW	RUS	Anton Kobyalko (to Gazovik Orenburg)
24	MF	BLR	Artsyom Salavey (released)
25	DF	RUS	Aleksei Revyakin (to Fakel Voronezh)
28	MF	RUS	Maksim Astafyev (end of loan from Sibir Novosibirsk)
36	MF	RUS	Konstantin Skrylnikov (to Fakel Voronezh)
37	FW	RUS	Dmitri Ryzhov (to Yenisey Krasnoyarsk)
58	DF	RUS	Adessoye Oyewole (on loan to Gazovik Orenburg)
61	FW	RUS	Mikhail Biryukov (to SKVO Rostov-on-Don)
81	GK	RUS	Dmitri Yashin (to Shinnik Yaroslavl)
88	FW	RUS	Aleksandr Marenich (to Spartak-2 Moscow)
90	FW	RUS	Yevgeny Savin (to Arsenal Tula)
—	MF	RUS	Maksim Volkov (to Fakel Voronezh, previously on loan to Baltika Kaliningrad)

=== Volga Nizhny Novgorod ===
In: Note: Flags indicate national team as defined under FIFA eligibility rules; some limited exceptions apply. Players may hold more than one non-FIFA nationality.

No.	Pos.	Nation	Player
1	GK	RUS	Artur Nigmatullin (from CSKA Moscow, previously on loan)
4	DF	POL	Marcin Kowalczyk (from (Poland) Śląsk Wrocław)
8	DF	RUS	Denis Kolodin (from Dynamo Moscow)
10	FW	RUS	Dmitri Sychev (on loan from Lokomotiv Moscow)
11	MF	RUS	Roman Kontsedalov (from Spartak Nalchik)
16	MF	RUS	Nikita Malyarov (end of loan to FC Ufa)
20	MF	RUS	Evgeni Aldonin (from CSKA Moscow)
21	FW	JAM	Luton Shelton (from (Turkey) Karabükspor)
22	FW	COD	Mulumba Mukendi (from (Slovakia) Ružomberok)
23	FW	RUS	Dmitri Bulykin (from (Netherlands) Twente)
26	DF	POL	Piotr Polczak (from Terek Grozny, previously on loan)
27	GK	RUS	Mikhail Komarov (free)
33	DF	SRB	Milan Rodić (on loan from Zenit St. Petersburg)
35	GK	EST	Sergei Pareiko (from (Poland) Wisła Kraków)
39	FW	RUS	Artyom Danilenko (from Khimik Dzerzhinsk)
77	MF	BRA	Leandro (from (Ukraine) Arsenal Kyiv)
80	MF	RUS	Dmitry Mikhaylenko (from Lokomotiv Moscow)

Out: Note: Flags indicate national team as defined under FIFA eligibility rules; some limited exceptions apply. Players may hold more than one non-FIFA nationality.

No.	Pos.	Nation	Player
2	DF	KGZ	Valerii Kichin (on loan to Khimik Dzerzhinsk)
4	MF	RUS	Dmitry Aydov (to Torpedo Moscow)
7	MF	RUS	Platon Pchyolkin (to Khimki)
8	DF	GEO	Gia Grigalava (to Anzhi Makhachkala)
10	MF	NED	Romeo Castelen (to (Netherlands) Waalwijk)
11	FW	RUS	Shamil Asildarov (released)
13	MF	RUS	Dmitri Kudryashov (to Torpedo Moscow)
14	FW	ARM	Artur Sarkisov (end of loan from Lokomotiv Moscow)
15	DF	RUS	Yegor Tarakanov (to Torpedo Moscow)
21	MF	RUS	Ruslan Adzhindzhal (to Krylia Sovetov Samara)
22	MF	RUS	Igor Belyakov (to Sever Murmansk)
24	MF	RUS	Ruslan Pashtov (on loan to Khimik Dzerzhinsk)
28	DF	RUS	Aleksandr Semyachkin (to Terek Grozny)
31	GK	RUS	Ilya Abayev (to Lokomotiv Moscow)
33	DF	RUS	Nikolai Zaytsev (to Alania Vladikavkaz)
41	GK	RUS	Mikhail Kerzhakov (to Anzhi Makhachkala)
52	FW	RUS	Mikhail Sorochkin (to Angusht Nazran)
63	DF	RUS	Aleksandr Belozyorov (to FC Ural Sverdlovsk Oblast)
77	FW	RUS	Aleksandr Salugin (to Torpedo Moscow)
80	MF	RUS	Artyom Bragin (to Terek Grozny)
83	MF	RUS	Aleksandr Kharitonov (released)
89	MF	RUS	Aleksei Mamonov (to Terek Grozny)
99	MF	RUS	Vladimir Torshentsev (to Terek-2 Grozny)
—	MF	RUS	Aleksei Pomerko (to Shinnik Yaroslavl, previously on loan to FC Khimki)

=== Zenit Saint Petersburg ===
In: Note: Flags indicate national team as defined under FIFA eligibility rules; some limited exceptions apply. Players may hold more than one non-FIFA nationality.

No.	Pos.	Nation	Player
1	GK	RUS	Juri Lodigin (from (Greece) Skoda Xanthi)
3	DF	ARG	Cristian Ansaldi (from Rubin Kazan)
17	MF	RUS	Oleg Shatov (from Anzhi Makhachkala)
19	DF	RUS	Igor Smolnikov (from Krasnodar)
23	FW	RUS	Andrei Arshavin (from (England) Arsenal)
44	MF	UKR	Anatoliy Tymoshchuk (from (Germany) Bayern Munich)
58	DF	RUS	Ilya Zuyev (end of loan to Tom Tomsk)
81	DF	RUS	Maksim Batov (end of loan to Chernomorets Novorossiysk)
88	FW	SRB	Danko Lazović (end of loan to FC Rostov)
99	MF	RUS	Ivan Solovyov (from Dynamo Moscow)

Out: Note: Flags indicate national team as defined under FIFA eligibility rules; some limited exceptions apply. Players may hold more than one non-FIFA nationality.

No.	Pos.	Nation	Player
3	DF	POR	Bruno Alves (to (Turkey) Fenerbahçe)
21	DF	SRB	Milan Rodić (on loan to Volga Nizhny Novgorod)
25	MF	RUS	Sergei Semak (retired)
27	MF	RUS	Igor Denisov (to Dynamo Moscow)
50	DF	RUS	Igor Cheminava (to Dynamo St. Petersburg)
63	DF	RUS	Denis Terentyev (on loan to Tom Tomsk)
77	FW	MNE	Luka Đorđević (on loan to (Netherlands) Twente)
88	DF	RUS	Dmitri Telegin
90	FW	RUS	Ilya Yeronin (released)
91	GK	RUS	Andrei Zaytsev (released)
—	MF	RUS	Yevgeni Bashkirov (to Tom Tomsk, previously on loan)
—	MF	RUS	Ilya Sagdatullin (released, previously on loan to Volgar Astrakhan)
—	FW	USA	Eugene Starikov (on loan to Tom Tomsk, previously on loan to FC Rostov)
