= Dmitri Yashin =

Dmitri Yashin may refer to:

- Dmitri Yashin (footballer, born 1981), Russian footballer
- Dmitri Yashin (footballer, born 1993), Russian footballer
