= Ilya Petrov =

Russian footballer

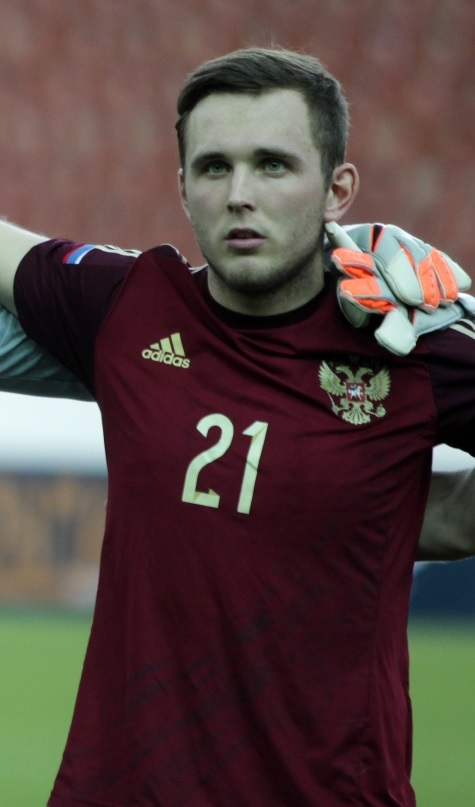
- Petrov with Russia U-21 in 2016

Personal information
- Full name: Ilya Alekseyevich Petrov
- Date of birth: 27 June 1995 (age 31)
- Place of birth: Nizhny Novgorod, Russia
- Height: 1.78 m (5 ft 10 in)
- Position: Midfielder

Team information
- Current team: Baltika Kaliningrad
- Number: 10

Youth career
- –2010: Master-Saturn Yegoryevsk
- 2011–2012: Krasnodar
- 2013: Volga Nizhny Novgorod

Senior career*
Years	Team	Apps	(Gls)
2013–2016	Volga Nizhny Novgorod	56	(2)
2016–2017	Dynamo Moscow	0	(0)
2016–2017	→ Mordovia Saransk (loan)	24	(4)
2017	→ Avangard Kursk (loan)	11	(1)
2018	União de Leiria	2	(0)
2018–2019	Mordovia Saransk	36	(4)
2019–2021	Neftekhimik Nizhnekamsk	58	(16)
2021–2022	Kuban Krasnodar	29	(2)
2022–2024	SKA-Khabarovsk	64	(11)
2024–	Baltika Kaliningrad	66	(4)

International career^{‡}
2010	Russia U-15	2	(0)
2016	Russia U-21	5	(0)
- * Club domestic league appearances and goals as of 8 November 2026 ‡ National team caps and goals as of 24 March 2016

Ilya Alekseyevich Petrov (Russian: Илья Алексеевич Петров; born 27 June 1995) is a Russian football player who plays for Baltika Kaliningrad.

== Club career ==
He made his professional debut in the Russian Football National League for Volga Nizhny Novgorod on 19 July 2014 in a game against Anzhi Makhachkala.

On 31 January 2018, he moved to the Portuguese club União de Leiria.

== Career statistics ==
As of 8 November 2026

Club	Season	League			Cup		Other		Total	
Club	Season	Division	Apps	Goals	Apps	Goals	Apps	Goals	Apps	Goals
Volga Nizhny Novgorod	2013–14	Russian Premier League	0	0	1	0	–		1	0
Volga Nizhny Novgorod	2014–15	Russian First League	29	0	1	0	5 (Note: Appearances in the FNL Cup)	1	35	1
Volga Nizhny Novgorod	2015–16	Russian First League	27	2	1	0	–		28	2
Volga Nizhny Novgorod	Total		56	2	3	0	5	1	64	3
Mordovia Saransk (loan)	2016–17	Russian First League	24	4	1	1	4	0	29	5
Avangard Kursk (loan)	2017–18	Russian First League	11	1	1	0	–		12	1
União de Leiria	2017–18	Campeonato de Portugal	2	0	–		–		2	0
Mordovia Saransk	2018–19	Russian First League	36	4	1	0	5	0	42	4
Neftekhimik Nizhnekamsk	2019–20	Russian First League	21	6	1	0	–		22	6
Neftekhimik Nizhnekamsk	2020–21	Russian First League	37	10	1	0	–		38	10
Neftekhimik Nizhnekamsk	Total		58	16	2	0	0	0	60	16
Kuban Krasnodar	2021–22	Russian First League	29	2	3	0	–		32	2
SKA-Khabarovsk	2022–23	Russian First League	32	7	0	0	–		32	7
SKA-Khabarovsk	2023–24	Russian First League	32	4	4	0	–		36	4
SKA-Khabarovsk	Total		64	11	4	0	0	0	68	11
Baltika Kaliningrad	2024–25	Russian First League	30	2	0	0	–		30	2
Baltika Kaliningrad	2025–26	Russian Premier League	27	1	1	0	–		28	1
Baltika Kaliningrad	2026–27	Russian Premier League	9	1	5	0	–		14	1
Baltika Kaliningrad	Total		66	4	6	0	0	0	72	4
Career total			346	44	21	1	14	1	381	46
