= Nikita Yurkov =

Russian footballer

Personal information
- Full name: Nikita Dmitriyevich Yurkov
- Date of birth: 4 May 1995 (age 31)
- Height: 1.78 m (5 ft 10 in)
- Positions: Defender; midfielder

Team information
- Current team: FC Vityaz Podolsk

Youth career
- –2009: DYuSSh Sormovich Nizhny Novgorod
- 2009–2010: Akademiya Futbola Nizhny Novgorod
- 2010: FC Moscow
- 2010–2013: FC Spartak Moscow
- 2013: FC Volga Nizhny Novgorod

Senior career*
Years	Team	Apps	(Gls)
2013–2014	FC Volga Nizhny Novgorod	0	(0)
2014	FC Metallurg Vyksa	2	(0)
2015	FC Volga Nizhny Novgorod	4	(0)
2016–2017	FC Saturn Ramenskoye	20	(0)
2018–	FC Vityaz Podolsk (amateur)		
- * Club domestic league appearances and goals as of 4 November 2017

Nikita Dmitriyevich Yurkov (Russian: Никита Дмитриевич Юрков; born 4 May 1995) is a Russian football player. He plays for FC Vityaz Podolsk.

== Club career ==
He made his professional debut in the Russian Professional Football League for FC Metallurg Vyksa on 22 August 2014 in a game against FC Avangard Kursk.

He made his Russian Football National League debut for FC Volga Nizhny Novgorod on 5 April 2015 in a game against PFC Krylia Sovetov Samara.
