= Igor Maslov =

Russian footballer

Personal information
- Full name: Igor Dmitriyevich Maslov
- Date of birth: 14 May 1995 (age 31)
- Place of birth: Nizhny Novgorod, Russia
- Height: 1.85 m (6 ft 1 in)
- Position: Defender

Senior career*
Years	Team	Apps	(Gls)
2013–2014	FC Volga Nizhny Novgorod	0	(0)
2014	FC DYuSSh-Olimpiyets-D Nizhny Novgorod		
2015	FC Volga Nizhny Novgorod	0	(0)
2015	FC Volga-Olimpiyets Nizhny Novgorod	15	(0)
2016	FC Volga Nizhny Novgorod	2	(0)
2017	FC Nosta Novotroitsk	23	(1)
2018	FC Smena Komsomolsk-na-Amure	8	(0)
2018–2019	FC Sakhalin Yuzhno-Sakhalinsk	17	(3)
2020–2023	FC Sakhalin Yuzhno-Sakhalinsk	79	(2)
2023–2024	FC Khimik Dzerzhinsk	7	(0)
2024	FC Volna Nizhny Novgorod Oblast	10	(0)
- * Club domestic league appearances and goals as of 19 October 2024

Igor Dmitriyevich Maslov (Russian: Игорь Дмитриевич Маслов; born 14 May 1995) is a Russian football player.

== Club career ==
He made his debut in the Russian Professional Football League for FC Volga-Olimpiyets Nizhny Novgorod on 10 August 2015 in a game against FC Syzran-2003.

He made his Russian Football National League debut for FC Volga Nizhny Novgorod on 20 March 2016 in a game against FC KAMAZ Naberezhnye Chelny.
