= Ilya Belous =

Russian football player

Personal information
- Full name: Ilya Andreyevich Belous
- Date of birth: 1 January 1995 (age 31)
- Place of birth: Iskitim, Novosibirsk Oblast, Russia
- Height: 1.87 m (6 ft 2 in)
- Position: Forward

Youth career
- 2010: Nara-ShBFR Naro-Fominsk
- 2011–2012: FC Olimpia-D Gelendzhik
- 2012–2013: CSKA Moscow
- 2014–2017: Krasnodar

Senior career*
Years	Team	Apps	(Gls)
2013–2014	CSKA Moscow	0	(0)
2013	→ Volga Nizhny Novgorod (loan)	0	(0)
2014	→ Lokomotiv-2 Moscow (loan)	8	(0)
2014–2018	Krasnodar-2	60	(27)
2016–2017	→ Milsami Orhei (loan)	24	(7)
2018	→ Afips Afipsky (loan)	10	(2)
2018–2019	Khimki	22	(6)
2018	→ Khimki-M	2	(0)
2019	→ Chayka Peschanokopskoye (loan)	5	(1)
2019–2020	Chayka Peschanokopskoye	34	(3)
2020–2021	Volgar Astrakhan	22	(1)
2021–2022	Shinnik Yaroslavl	30	(6)
2022	Belshina Bobruisk	3	(0)
2023	Dynamo Bryansk	15	(0)

International career
2013	Russia U19	3	(0)
- * Club domestic league appearances and goals

Ilya Andreyevich Belous (Russian: Илья Андреевич Белоус; born 1 January 1995) is a Russian former football player who played as a forward.

== Club career ==
He made his professional debut in the Russian Professional Football League for FC Lokomotiv-2 Moscow on 19 April 2014 in a game against FC Strogino Moscow.

He played for the main squad of FC Volga Nizhny Novgorod in the Russian Cup on 30 October 2013 in a game against FC SKA-Energiya Khabarovsk.

He made his Russian Football National League debut for FC Khimki on 17 July 2018 in a game against FC Luch Vladivostok.
