= Aleksei Shelyakov =

Russian footballer

Personal information
- Full name: Aleksei Sergeyevich Shelyakov
- Date of birth: 30 March 1995 (age 31)
- Place of birth: Nizhny Novgorod, Russia
- Height: 1.78 m (5 ft 10 in)
- Position: Forward

Youth career
- –2009: SDYuSShOR-8 Nizhny Novgorod
- 2009–2012: Nizhny Novgorod Football Academy
- 2012–2013: FC Volga Nizhny Novgorod

Senior career*
Years	Team	Apps	(Gls)
2013–2014	FC Volga Nizhny Novgorod	0	(0)
2014	FC Metallurg Vyksa	7	(0)
2015–2016	FC Volga Nizhny Novgorod	5	(0)
2016	→ FC Volga-Olimpiyets Nizhny Novgorod (loan)	9	(1)
2016–2017	FC Domodedovo Moscow	26	(1)
2018	FC Dynamo Stavropol	18	(1)
2019–2020	FC Lokomotiv Nizhny Novgorod (amateur)		
2020	FC Salyut-Sormovo Dzerzhinsk		
2021	FC Khimik Dzerzhinsk (amateur)		
2021	FC Khimik Dzerzhinsk	3	(0)
- * Club domestic league appearances and goals

Aleksei Sergeyevich Shelyakov (Russian: Алексей Сергеевич Шеляков; born 30 March 1995) is a Russian former football player.

== Club career ==
He made his professional debut in the Russian Professional Football League for FC Metallurg Vyksa on 12 July 2014 in a game against FC Fakel Voronezh.

He made his Russian Football National League debut for FC Volga Nizhny Novgorod on 31 August 2015 in a game against FC KAMAZ Naberezhnye Chelny.
