= Aleksei Revyakin =

Russian footballer

Aleksei Revyakin Алексей Ревякин
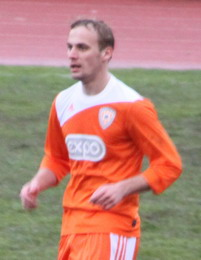

Personal information
- Full name: Aleksei Igorevich Revyakin
- Date of birth: 9 May 1982 (age 44)
- Place of birth: Pryluky, Chernihiv Oblast, Ukrainian SSR
- Height: 1.88 m (6 ft 2 in)
- Positions: Midfielder; defender

Senior career*
Years	Team	Apps	(Gls)
2000	PFC CSKA-2 Moscow	30	(0)
2001	PFC CSKA Moscow	0	(0)
2002	FC Severstal Cherepovets	12	(0)
2002	FC Kolomna	14	(0)
2004	FC Vidnoye	17	(1)
2004	FC Anzhi Makhachkala	1	(0)
2005	FC Reutov	30	(3)
2006	FC Khimki	27	(1)
2007	FC Salyut-Energiya Belgorod	27	(1)
2008–2009	FC Baltika Kaliningrad	67	(0)
2010–2011	FC Zhemchuzhina-Sochi	48	(0)
2011–2013	FC Ural Sverdlovsk Oblast	43	(2)
2013–2015	FC Fakel Voronezh	55	(7)
2015–2016	FC Zenit Penza	23	(2)
2016	FC Kraskovo		
2017	FC Troitsk		
- * Club domestic league appearances and goals

Aleksei Igorevich Revyakin (Russian: Алексей Игоревич Ревякин; born 9 May 1982) is a former Russian professional football player.

== Club career ==
He made his Russian Football National League debut for FC Anzhi Makhachkala on 7 October 2004 in a game against FC Chernomorets Novorossiysk. He played 8 seasons in the FNL for 5 clubs.
