= Artur Minosyan =

Russian footballer

Personal information
- Full name: Artur Varkezovich Minosyan
- Date of birth: 4 August 1989 (age 37)
- Place of birth: Novorossiysk, Russian SFSR
- Height: 1.78 m (5 ft 10 in)
- Position: Midfielder

Senior career*
| Years | Team | Apps | (Gls) |
| 2007 | FC Spartak-UGP Anapa | 22 | (0) |
| 2008 | FC Krasnodar-2000 | 15 | (0) |
| 2009 | FC Chernomorets Novorossiysk (reserves) | | |
| 2010–2013 | FC Chernomorets Novorossiysk | 87 | (9) |
| 2014–2016 | FC Volga Nizhny Novgorod | 57 | (4) |
| 2017 | FC Torpedo Moscow | 8 | (1) |
| 2017–2020 | FC Chernomorets Novorossiysk | 45 | (2) |
- * Club domestic league appearances and goals

Artur Varkezovich Minosyan (Russian: Артур Варкезович Миносян; born 4 August 1989) is a Russian former professional football player of Armenian descent.

== Club career ==
He made his Russian Football National League debut for FC Chernomorets Novorossiysk on 4 April 2011 in a game against FC Gazovik Orenburg.

He made his Russian Premier League debut for FC Volga Nizhny Novgorod on 10 March 2014 in a game against FC Amkar Perm.
