= Denis Kolodin =

Russian footballer

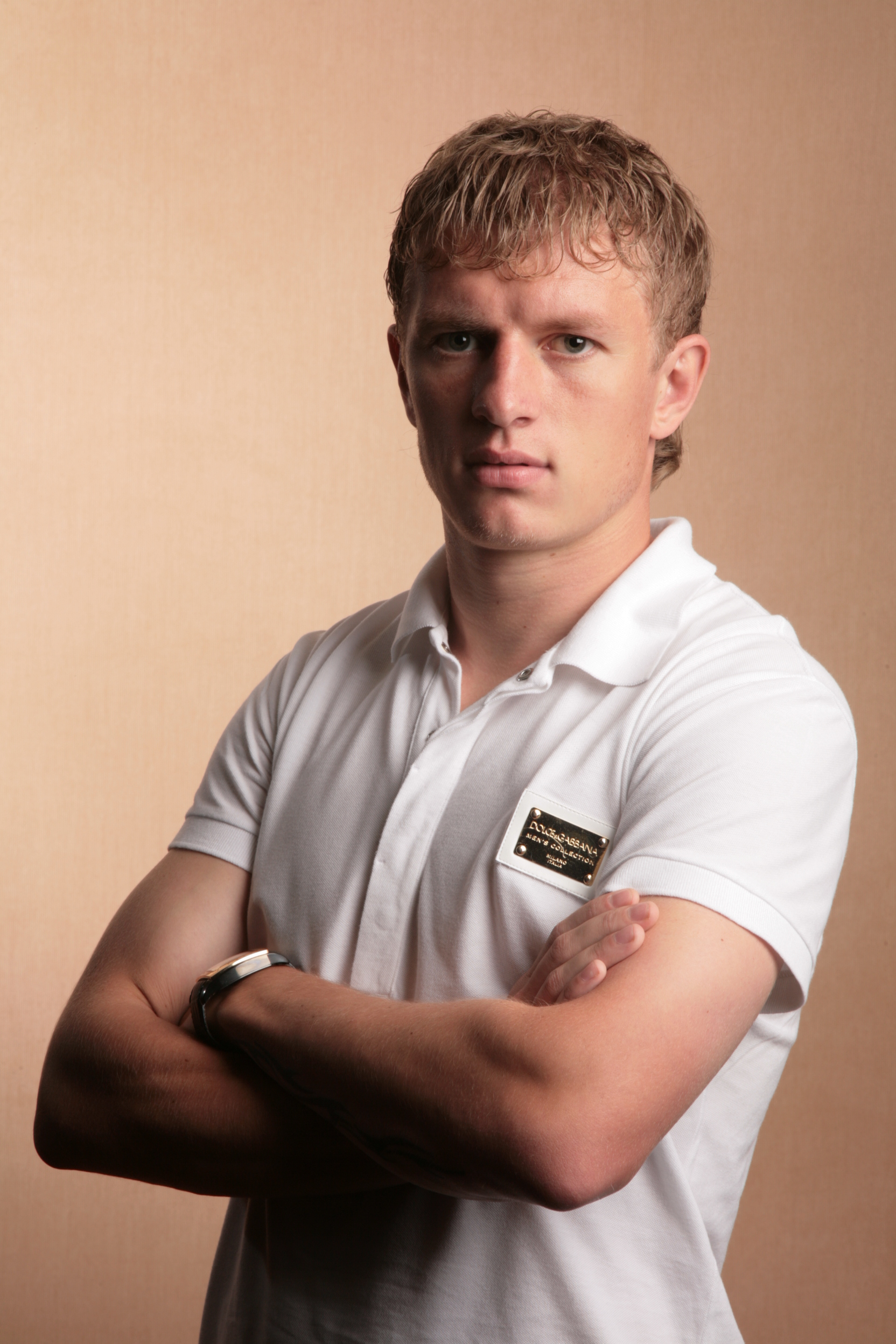

Personal information
- Full name: Denis Alexeyevich Kolodin
- Date of birth: 11 January 1982 (age 44)
- Place of birth: Kamyshin, Russian SFSR, Soviet Union
- Height: 1.86 m (6 ft 1 in)
- Position: Centre-back

Senior career*
Years	Team	Apps	(Gls)
1999	Olimpia Volgograd (D4)		
2000–2001	Olimpia Volgograd	66	(14)
2002–2003	Uralan Elista	44	(3)
2004–2005	Krylia Sovetov	39	(2)
2005–2013	Dynamo Moscow	132	(15)
2012	→ Rostov (loan)	10	(0)
2013–2014	Volga Nizhny Novgorod	21	(0)
2015	Sokol Saratov	5	(0)
2016–2017	Altai Semey	22	(0)

International career
2002–2003	Russia U-21	13	(0)
2004–2010	Russia	23	(0)

Managerial career
- 2018–2019: FC Khimki-M (assistant)
- * Club domestic league appearances and goals

Denis Alexeyevich Kolodin (Russian: Денис Алексеевич Колодин; born 11 January 1982) is a Russian football coach and former central defender. He was called up to the Russia squad for UEFA Euro 2008 in Austria and Switzerland.

== Biography ==
Denis Alexeevich Kolodin was born on January 11, 1982, in Kamyshin. Denis was the first child in his family, he has a younger brother Andrei. Lived in a dormitory with his mother and stepfather. His mother, originally from Belarus, worked as a saleswoman, he never knew his own father and in childhood he considered his stepfather to be such.

== Career ==
=== Club ===
During his career, Kolodin has played for a number of Russian clubs. He started his career at FC Olimpia Volgograd where he remained for two years, scoring an impressive fourteen goals in 66 appearances before moving to FC Uralan in 2003. He made 44 appearances for the club and scored three goals. In 2004, he left for Krylia Sovetov, making 39 appearances and scoring two goals.

He moved to one of Russia's bigger clubs, Dynamo Moscow in 2005, and has had a successful time there, making 130 appearances and scoring fifteen goals along the way (as of 22 May 2012).

=== International ===
Kolodin received his first international call-up for the Russian national team in 2004. As of 21 June 2008 he has made thirteen appearances for the national team .

==== Euro 2008 ====
Kolodin got the chance to appear in his first major international tournament at Euro 2008. He played in all three of Russia's group D matches, against Spain, Sweden and Greece. In the quarter-finals against the Netherlands he received a yellow card midway through the second half and was then shown a second yellow in the last minute, meaning a red card. However, the referee reversed his decision after consulting with his assistant on the basis that the ball had gone out of play before Kolodin committed the tackle. This was a controversial and much-debated decision at the time. Russia went on to win the match 3–1 in extra time.

== Career statistics ==
=== Club ===
As of 1 July 2012

Club	Div	Season	League		Cup		Europe		Total	
Club	Div	Season	Apps	Goals	Apps	Goals	Apps	Goals	Apps	Goals
(Russia) Olimpia Volgograd	D3	2000	34	7	—		—		34	7
(Russia) Olimpia Volgograd	D3	2001	32	7	2	0	—		34	7
(Russia) Olimpia Volgograd	Total		66	14	2	0	0	0	68	14
(Russia) Uralan Elista	D1	2002	22	1	2	0	—		24	1
(Russia) Uralan Elista	D1	2003	22	2	2	0	—		24	2
(Russia) Uralan Elista	Total		44	3	4	0	0	0	48	3
(Russia) Krylia Sovetov	D1	2004	25	1	6	0	—		31	1
(Russia) Krylia Sovetov	D1	2005	14	1	4	1	—		18	2
(Russia) Krylia Sovetov	Total		39	2	10	1	0	0	49	3
(Russia) Dynamo Moscow	D1	2005	13	1	1	0	—		14	1
(Russia) Dynamo Moscow	D1	2006	27	1	5	1	—		32	2
(Russia) Dynamo Moscow	D1	2007	27	9	5	1	—		32	10
(Russia) Dynamo Moscow	D1	2008	22	1	1	0	—		23	1
(Russia) Dynamo Moscow	D1	2009	23	2	3	0	4	0	30	2
(Russia) Dynamo Moscow	D1	2010	15	1	1	0	—		16	1
(Russia) Dynamo Moscow	D1	2011–12	3	0	0	0	—		3	0
(Russia) Dynamo Moscow	Total		130	15	16	2	4	0	150	17
(Russia) FC Rostov (loan)	D1	2011–12	10	0	1	0	—		11	0
Career total			289	34	33	3	4	0	326	37

=== International ===
Russia national team
Year	Apps	Goals
2004	2	0
2005	2	0
2006	2	0
2007	4	0
2008	9	0
2009	2	0
2010	2	0
Total	23	0

Statistics accurate as of match played 11 August 2010

== Honors ==
=== International ===
Russia

- UEFA European Championship bronze medalist: 2008
