= Sergei Pareiko =

Estonian footballer

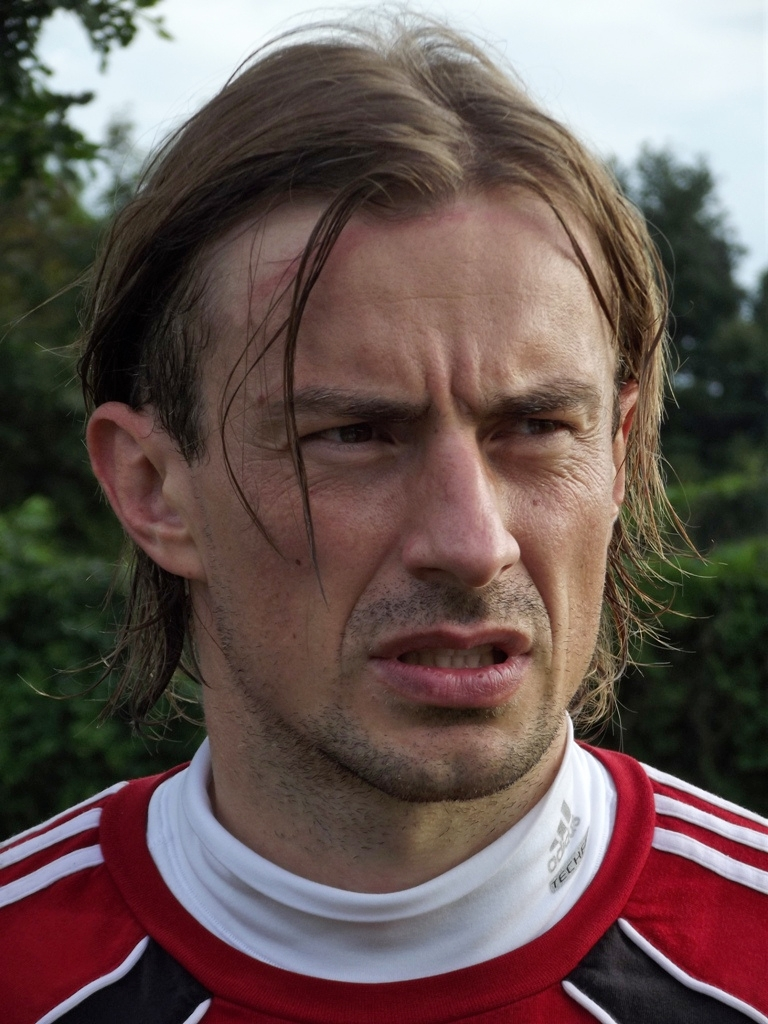

Personal information
- Date of birth: 31 January 1977 (age 49)
- Place of birth: Tallinn, then part of Estonian SSR, Soviet Union
- Height: 1.93 m (6 ft 4 in)
- Position: Goalkeeper

Youth career
- 1989–1990: Puuma
- 1990–1992: Vigri

Senior career*
| Years | Team | Apps | (Gls) |
| 1992–1993 | Vigri | 5 | (0) |
| 1993–1997 | Tallinna Sadam | 61 | (0) |
| 1998–1999 | Casale | 23 | (0) |
| 1999–2000 | Levadia | 39 | (0) |
| 2001–2004 | Rotor Volgograd | 51 | (0) |
| 2005–2010 | Tom Tomsk | 114 | (0) |
| 2011–2013 | Wisła Kraków | 64 | (0) |
| 2013–2014 | Volga Nizhny Novgorod | 19 | (0) |
| 2015 | Levadia | 31 | (0) |
| Total | | 407 | (0) |

International career
| 1993–1994 | Estonia U18 | 6 | (0) |
| 1994–1997 | Estonia U21 | 7 | (0) |
| 1996–2015 | Estonia | 65 | (0) |
- * Club domestic league appearances and goals

Sergei Pareiko (born 31 January 1977) is an Estonian former professional footballer. He played as a goalkeeper in Estonian, Russian and Polish top tiers. He made a total of 65 appearances for the Estonia national team.

He worked as the sporting director of Estonian football club Levadia from 2016 until July 2021.

== Club career ==
In Estonia, Pareiko played for Tallinna Sadam and Levadia Maardu, before moving to Russia in 2001, when he signed with Rotor Volgograd. After Rotor were relegated, Pareiko moved to Tom Tomsk.

At the end of 2009 season, Pareiko was named the Tom Tomsk Player of Year, sharing this title with Đorđe Jokić. In late 2010, speculation began to mount that Celtic were interested in Pareiko's services. Pareiko was left on the bench for Tomsk's last match of the season. He left the club on 25 December.

On 8 February 2011, Pareiko joined Polish Ekstraklasa side Wisła Kraków on a one-and-a-half-year deal. He became the first choice goalkeeper and won the Ekstraklasa championship in his debut season. Pareiko finished third in voting for the Estonian Footballer of the Year in 2011.

== International career ==
Pareiko made his international debut for the Estonia national team on 31 August 1996, in a 1998 World Cup qualifier against Belarus when the first choice keeper, Mart Poom, got injured in the 8th minute of the match. The match ended with 0–1 loss.

His second cap came six years later and he became the team's first choice keeper in 2009. On 17 November 2015, Pareiko made his last appearance for Estonia against Saint Kitts and Nevis. The game ended 3-0 for Estonia. Pareiko's national team career lasted 19 years, 2 months and 17 days, making him the longest serving Estonia national team member ahead of Andres Oper.

== Personal life ==
Pareiko was born in Tallinn, to a Russian mother and Belarusian father. In the interview for Gazeta Krakowska he said "I am a citizen of Estonia, I have a passport of that country, but I am of Russian ethnicity". He married Victoria, in 2003, and they have one son named Daniil. Daniil is also a goalkeeper who made his senior debut in the Italian Serie D in 2023. As of 2026, Daniil is with Narva Trans.

== Career statistics ==
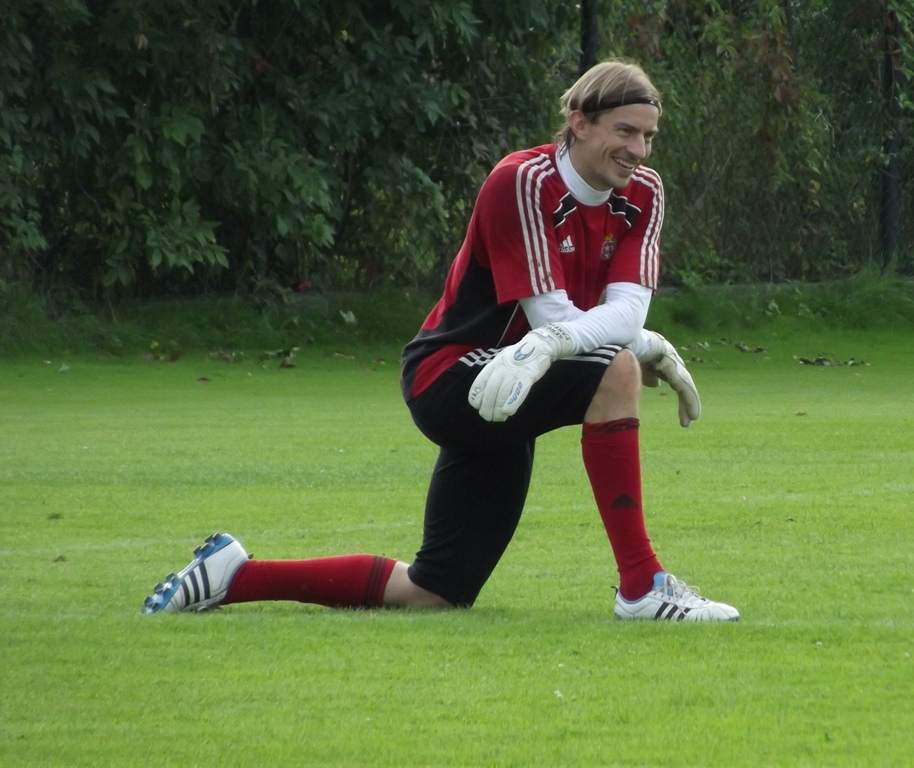
Pareiko training with Wisła Kraków in August 2011

=== Club career ===
This statistic includes domestic league only

| Season | Club | Country | Level | Apps | Goals |
|---|---|---|---|---|---|
| 2015 | FC Levadia | Estonia | I | 31 | 0 |
| 2013–14 | FC Volga Nizhny Novgorod | Russia | I | 19 | 0 |
| 2012–13 | Wisła Kraków | Poland | I | 22 | 0 |
| 2011–12 | Wisła Kraków | Poland | I | 28 | 0 |
| 2010–11 | Wisła Kraków | Poland | I | 14 | 0 |
| 2010 | FC Tom Tomsk | Russia | I | 26 | 0 |
| 2009 | FC Tom Tomsk | Russia | I | 26 | 0 |
| 2008 | FC Tom Tomsk | Russia | I | 9 | 0 |
| 2007 | FC Tom Tomsk | Russia | I | 14 | 0 |
| 2006 | FC Tom Tomsk | Russia | I | 23 | 0 |
| 2005 | FC Tom Tomsk | Russia | I | 16 | 0 |
| 2004 | FC Rotor Volgograd | Russia | I | 6 | 0 |
| 2003 | FC Rotor Volgograd | Russia | I | 30 | 0 |
| 2002 | FC Rotor Volgograd | Russia | I | 3 | 0 |
| 2001 | FC Rotor Volgograd | Russia | I | 12 | 0 |
| 2000 | Levadia Maardu | Estonia | I | 24 | 0 |
| 1999 | Levadia Maardu | Estonia | I | 15 | 0 |
| 1998–99 | A.S. Casale Calcio | Italy | V | 23 | 0 |
| 1997–98 | Tallinna Sadam JK | Estonia | I | 11 | 0 |
| 1996–97 | Tallinna Sadam JK | Estonia | I | 21 | 0 |
| 1995–96 | Tallinna Sadam JK | Estonia | I | 17 | 0 |
| 1994–95 | Tallinna Sadam JK | Estonia | I | 10 | 0 |
| 1993–94 | Tallinna Sadam JK | Estonia | I | 2 | 0 |
| 1992–93 | KSK Vigri Tallinn | Estonia | I | 5 | 0 |

Last update: 17 November 2015

=== International statistics ===
International appearances
| # | Date | Opponent | Score | Result | Competition | Footnotes |
|---|---|---|---|---|---|---|
| 1 | 31 August 1996 | Belarus | 0–1 | Lost | 1998 World Cup Qualification | Sub. |
| 2 | 2 July 2002 | Kazakhstan | 1–1 | Drawn | Friendly | |
| 3 | 13 February 2003 | Ecuador | 1–2 | Lost | Friendly | |
| 4 | 3 July 2003 | Lithuania | 1–5 | Lost | 2003 Baltic Cup | |
| 5 | 17 October 2007 | Montenegro | 0–1 | Lost | Friendly | Sub |
| 6 | 12 November 2008 | Latvia | 1–1 | Drawn | Friendly | |
| 7 | 11 February 2009 | Kazakhstan | 2–0 | Lost | Friendly | |
| 8 | 28 March 2009 | Armenia | 2–2 | Drawn | 2010 World Cup Qualification | |
| 9 | 1 April 2009 | Armenia | 1–0 | Won | 2010 World Cup Qualification | |
| 10 | 10 June 2009 | Portugal | 0–0 | Drawn | Friendly | Sub |
| 11 | 12 August 2009 | Brazil | 0–1 | Lost | Friendly | |
| 12 | 5 September 2009 | Turkey | 4–2 | Lost | 2010 World Cup Qualification | |
| 13 | 9 September 2009 | Spain | 3–0 | Lost | 2010 World Cup Qualification | |
| 14 | 10 October 2009 | Bosnia and Herzegovina | 2–0 | Lost | 2010 World Cup Qualification | |
| 15 | 15 October 2009 | Belgium | 2–0 | Won | 2010 World Cup Qualification | |
| 16 | 14 November 2009 | Albania | 0–0 | Drawn | Friendly | |
| 17 | 21 May 2010 | Finland | 2–0 | Won | Friendly | |
| 18 | 26 May 2010 | Croatia | 0–0 | Drawn | Friendly | |
| 19 | 11 August 2010 | Faroe Islands | 2–1 | Won | Euro 2012 Qualification | |
| 20 | 3 September 2010 | Italy | 2–1 | Lost | Euro 2012 Qualification | |
| 21 | 8 October 2010 | Serbia | 3–1 | Won | Euro 2012 Qualification | |
| 22 | 12 October 2010 | Slovenia | 1–0 | Lost | Euro 2012 Qualification | |
| 23 | 25 March 2011 | Uruguay | 2–0 | Won | Friendly | |
| 24 | 29 March 2011 | Serbia | 1–1 | Drawn | Euro 2012 Qualification | |
| 25 | 3 June 2011 | Italy | 3–0 | Lost | Euro 2012 Qualification | |
| 26 | 7 June 2011 | Faroe Islands | 2–0 | Lost | Euro 2012 Qualification | |
| 27 | 10 August 2011 | Turkey | 3–0 | Lost | Friendly | |
| 28 | 2 September 2011 | Slovenia | 1–2 | Won | Euro 2012 Qualification | |
| 29 | 6 September 2011 | Northern Ireland | 4–1 | Won | Euro 2012 Qualification | |
| 30 | 8 October 2011 | Northern Ireland | 1–2 | Won | Euro 2012 Qualification | |

== Honours ==
Tallinna Sadam

- Estonian Cup: 1995–96, 1996–97
- Estonian SuperCup: 1997

Casale Calcio

- Coppa Italia Dilettanti: 1998–99

Levadia Maardu

- Meistriliiga: 1999, 2000
- Estonian Cup: 1999–2000
- Estonian SuperCup: 1999, 2000

Wisła Kraków

- Ekstraklasa: 2010–11

Individual

- Tom Tomsk Player of the Year: 2009
