= Mikhail Komarov =

Russian footballer

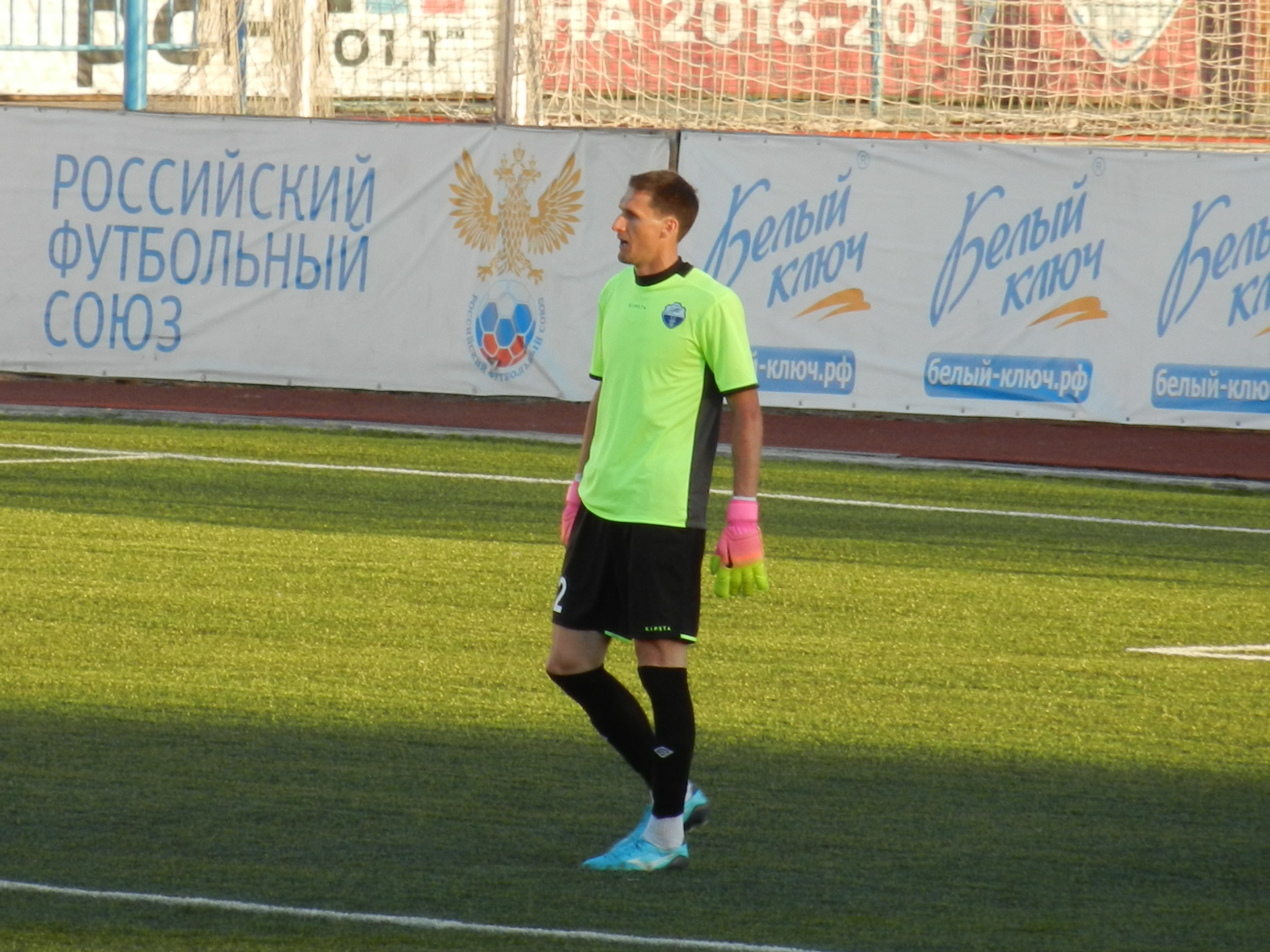

Personal information
- Full name: Mikhail Yuryevich Komarov
- Date of birth: 3 April 1984 (age 42)
- Place of birth: Moscow, Soviet Union
- Height: 1.94 m (6 ft 4 in)
- Position: Goalkeeper

Youth career
- –2000: FC Dynamo Moscow

Senior career*
Years	Team	Apps	(Gls)
2001–2003	FC Dynamo Moscow	1	(0)
2004	FC Spartak Shchyolkovo	25	(0)
2005	FC Chkalovets-1936 Novosibirsk	8	(0)
2006	FC Spartak Shchyolkovo	19	(0)
2007–2008	FC Sportakademklub Moscow	57	(0)
2009	FC Khimki	10	(0)
2010	FC Luch-Energiya Vladivostok	15	(0)
2011–2012	FC Volgar-Gazprom Astrakhan	18	(0)
2012	FC Fakel Voronezh	0	(0)
2013–2015	FC Volga Nizhny Novgorod	21	(0)
2015–2016	FC Torpedo Armavir	34	(0)
2016–2017	FC Neftekhimik Nizhnekamsk	4	(0)
2017	FC Zorky Krasnogorsk	14	(0)
- * Club domestic league appearances and goals

Mikhail Yuryevich Komarov (Russian: Михаил Юрьевич Комаров; born 3 April 1984) is a Russian former footballer.
