= Dmitry Mikhaylenko (footballer, born 1995) =

Russian footballer

Personal information
- Full name: Dmitry Viktorovich Mikhaylenko
- Date of birth: 6 January 1995 (age 31)
- Place of birth: Kalnibolotskaya, Russia
- Height: 1.74 m (5 ft 8 1/2 in)
- Position: Midfielder

Youth career
- 2011–2013: Lokomotiv Moscow

Senior career*
Years	Team	Apps	(Gls)
2010	Nara-ShBFR-2 Naro-Fominsk		
2013	Volga Nizhny Novgorod	0	(0)
2014–2015	Vityaz Krymsk	16	(0)
2015–2017	Chernomorets Novorossiysk	39	(3)
2017	Spartak Nalchik	11	(1)
2018	Biolog-Novokubansk	13	(0)

International career
2011	Russia U-16	9	(2)
2011–2012	Russia U-17	6	(0)
- * Club domestic league appearances and goals

Dmitry Viktorovich Mikhaylenko (Russian: Дмитрий Викторович Михайленко; born 6 January 1995) is a Russian former football player.

== Club career ==
He made his professional debut in the Russian Professional Football League for FC Vityaz Krymsk on 20 August 2014 in a game against FC Biolog-Novokubansk Progress.

He played for the main squad of FC Volga Nizhny Novgorod in a Russian Cup against FC SKA-Energiya Khabarovsk on 30 October 2013.
