= Mikhail Sorochkin =

Russian footballer

Personal information
- Full name: Mikhail Olegovich Sorochkin
- Date of birth: 20 February 1992 (age 34)
- Place of birth: Nizhny Novgorod, Russia
- Height: 1.79 m (5 ft 10 1/2 in)
- Position: Forward

Youth career
- 2010–2013: Volga Nizhny Novgorod

Senior career*
Years	Team	Apps	(Gls)
2011–2013	Volga Nizhny Novgorod	0	(0)
2013–2014	Angusht Nazran	17	(1)
2014	Volga Tver	3	(0)
2014	Ryazan	3	(0)
2015	FC Shakhtyor Peshelan	8	(3)
2015–2016	Volga-Olimpiyets Nizhny Novgorod	16	(3)
2016	Syzran-2003	13	(0)
2017–2018	Olimpiyets Nizhny Novgorod	34	(6)
2019	Gorodeya	3	(0)
2019	Murom	8	(1)
2020	Kaluga	0	(0)
2020	TSK Simferopol	5	(2)
- * Club domestic league appearances and goals

Mikhail Olegovich Sorochkin (Russian: Михаил Олегович Сорочкин; born 20 February 1992) is a Russian former football forward.

== Club career ==
He made his debut in the Russian Football National League for FC Angusht Nazran on 5 September 2013 in a game against FC Sibir Novosibirsk.
