= Marcin Kowalczyk =

Polish footballer

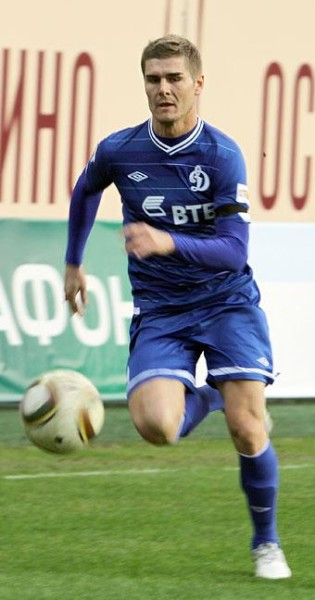
- Kowalczyk in 2010 with Dynamo Moscow

Personal information
- Date of birth: 9 April 1985 (age 41)
- Place of birth: Wieruszów, Poland
- Height: 1.82 m (6 ft 0 in)
- Position: Centre-back

Youth career
- –1990: Polonia Kępno
- 2002: UKS SMS Łódź

Senior career*
Years	Team	Apps	(Gls)
2003–2004	ŁKS Łódź	19	(0)
2004	UKS SMS Łódź		
2005	Stal Głowno		
2006–2008	GKS Bełchatów	42	(0)
2008–2011	Dynamo Moscow	46	(0)
2011	→ Metalurh Donetsk (loan)	0	(0)
2011–2012	Zagłębie Lubin	7	(0)
2012–2013	Śląsk Wrocław	24	(0)
2013–2014	Volga Nizhny Novgorod	23	(2)
2015–2016	FC Tosno	34	(0)
2016–2017	Ruch Chorzów	24	(0)
2017–2018	Ruch Chorzów	16	(1)
2018–2020	GKS Tychy	29	(0)

International career
2004	Poland U19		
2008–2013	Poland	8	(0)
- * Club domestic league appearances and goals

Marcin Kowalczyk (born 9 April 1985) is a Polish former professional footballer who played as a centre-back.

== Club career ==
In early 2006, Kowalczyk joined GKS Bełchatów, where he played for two years. On 26 February 2008, he signed with Dynamo Moscow. In March 2011, he was loaned to Metalurh Donetsk.

In August 2011, he joined Zagłębie Lubin on a one-year contract.

== International career ==
Kowalczyk made his first appearance for the Poland national team in a friendly against Ukraine on 20 August 2008.

== Career statistics ==
=== International ===
Appearances and goals by national team and year
National team	Year	Apps	Goals
Poland
Poland	2008	3	0
Poland	2009	2	0
Poland	2010	2	0
Poland	2013	1	0
Total		8	0

== Honours ==
Śląsk Wrocław

- Polish Super Cup: 2012
