= Leandro da Silva (footballer, born 1985) =

Brazilian footballer

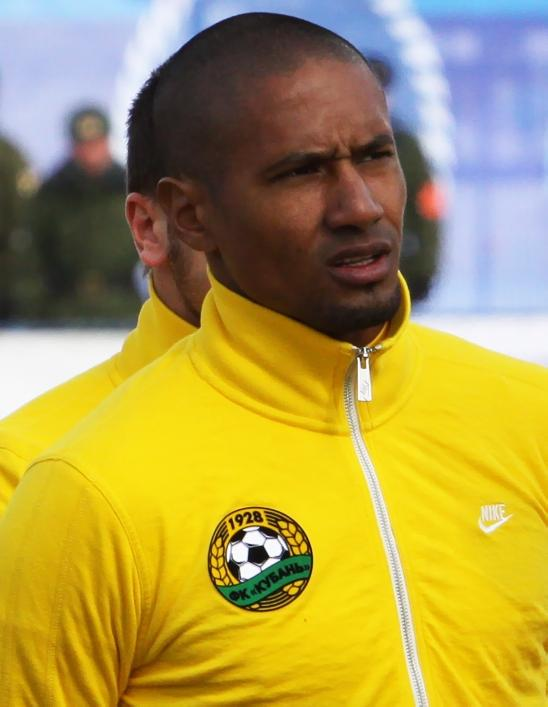
- Leandro with Kuban in 2013

Personal information
- Date of birth: 26 June 1985 (age 41)
- Place of birth: Itumbiara, Brazil
- Height: 1.80 m (5 ft 11 in)
- Positions: Right winger; right back

Senior career*
Years	Team	Apps	(Gls)
2005	XV de Piracicaba		
2006	Pogoń Szczecin	9	(1)
2007–2008	Kaposvári Rákóczi	22	(4)
2008	Luch-Energiya Vladivostok	19	(1)
2009–2011	Spartak Nalchik	77	(16)
2011–2013	Arsenal Kyiv	23	(0)
2013	→ Kuban Krasnodar (loan)	7	(0)
2013–2016	Volga Nizhny Novgorod	65	(5)
2017	Stal Kamianske	14	(1)
2018	Atlantas	18	(0)
2019	Rukh Lviv	27	(1)
2020–2021	TuS Rüssingen	7	(2)
- * Club domestic league appearances and goals

Leandro da Silva (born 26 June 1985) is a Brazilian former football player.

== Career ==
=== Club ===
Leandro had previously played two years in Poland and Hungary with Pogoń Szczecin and Kaposvári Rákóczi FC before moving to Vladivostok with fellow Brazilian Kaposvári and his teammate Andre Alves in July 2008. Spartak Nalchik had signed Leandro from FC Luch-Energiya Vladivostok on 20 February 2009.

On 30 June 2013, Leandro had signed for Volga Nizhny Novgorod, and leaving the club by mutual consent on 31 March 2016.

On 13 March 2018, Leandro had signed a one-year contract with FK Atlantas.

== Career statistics ==
=== Club ===
As of match played 31 October 2018

Appearances and goals by club, season and competition
Club	Season	League			National Cup		Continental		Other		Total	
Club	Season	Division	Apps	Goals	Apps	Goals	Apps	Goals	Apps	Goals	Apps	Goals
Luch-Energiya Vladivostok	2008	Premier League	19	1	0	0	–		–		19	1
Spartak Nalchik	2009	Premier League	30	8	0	0	-		-		30	8
Spartak Nalchik	2010	Premier League	26	6	1	0	-		-		27	6
Spartak Nalchik	2011–12	Premier League	21	2	0	0	-		-		21	2
Spartak Nalchik	Total		77	16	1	0	-	-	-	-	78	16
Arsenal Kyiv	2011–12	Premier League	6	0	1	0	-		-		7	0
Arsenal Kyiv	2012–13	Premier League	17	0	2	0	1	0	-		20	0
Arsenal Kyiv	Total		23	0	3	0	1	0	-	-	27	0
Kuban Krasnodar (loan)	2012–13	Premier League	7	0	1	0	–		–		8	0
Volga Nizhny Novgorod	2013–14	Premier League	24	0	0	0	-		-		24	0
Volga Nizhny Novgorod	2014–15	National League	25	3	0	0	-		-		25	3
Volga Nizhny Novgorod	2015–16	National League	16	2	1	0	-		-		17	2
Volga Nizhny Novgorod	Total		65	5	1	0	-	-	-	-	66	5
Stal Kamianske	2016–17	Premier League	14	1	0	0	–		–		14	1
Atlantas	2018	A Lyga	18	0	1	0	–		–		19	0
Career total			223	23	7	0	1	0	-	-	231	23
