= Artur Sarkisov =

Armenian footballer (born 1987)

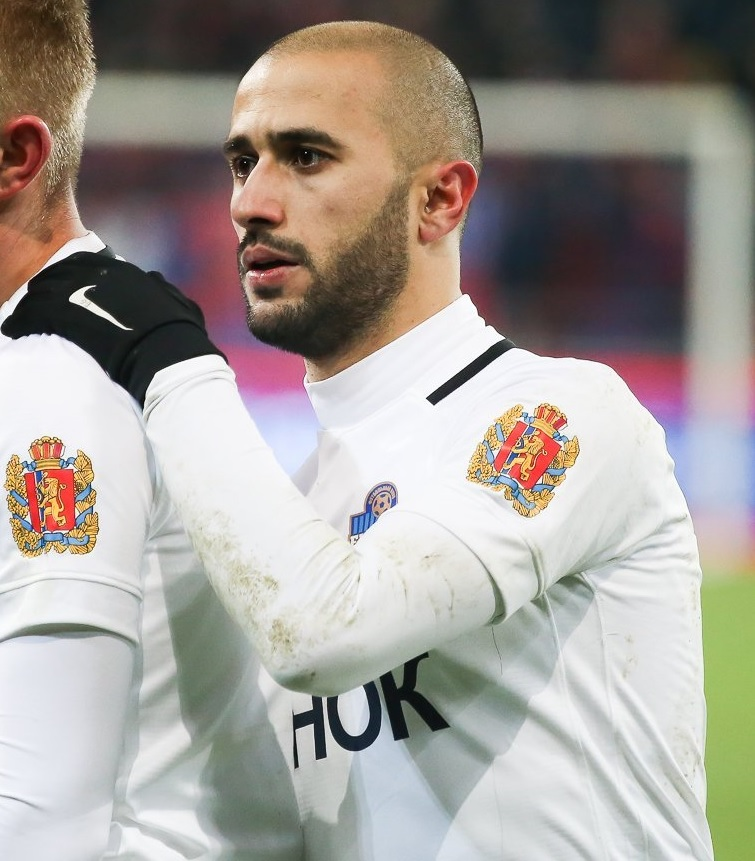
- Sarkisov with Yenisey Krasnoyarsk in 2018

Personal information
- Full name: Artur Sergeyevich Sarkisov
- Date of birth: 19 January 1987 (age 39)
- Place of birth: Grozny, Soviet Union (now Russia)
- Height: 1.74 m (5 ft 9 in)
- Position: Striker

Senior career*
Years	Team	Apps	(Gls)
2006–2008	Reutov	74	(15)
2009–2010	Lokomotiv-2 Moscow	42	(31)
2011–2013	Lokomotiv Moscow	0	(0)
2011–2012	→ Shinnik Yaroslavl (loan)	43	(8)
2012–2013	→ Volga Nizhny Novgorod (loan)	18	(3)
2013–2014	Ural Sverdlovsk Oblast	13	(1)
2014–2016	Volga Nizhny Novgorod	63	(19)
2016	Mordovia Saransk	20	(5)
2017–2020	Yenisey Krasnoyarsk	69	(6)
2020–2021	Olimp-Dolgoprudny	12	(4)
2021	→ Olimp-Dolgoprudny-2	5	(0)
2021–2022	Kuban Krasnodar	18	(1)
2022	Kosmos Dolgoprudny	18	(4)

International career
2011–2019	Armenia	42	(6)
- * Club domestic league appearances and goals

Artur Sergeyevich Sarkisov (Armenian: Արթուր Սարկիսով; Russian: Артур Сергеевич Саркисов; born 19 January 1987) is an Armenian former professional footballer who played as a striker or winger.

== Club career ==
=== Lower league football ===
Sarkisov started playing aged 12 in FC Strogino football school. In one of the friendly matches with FC Reutov, Arthur scored a hat-trick, and then the board of the Moscow Region club offered him a contract. In his first season at the professional level, Arthur scored 3 goals in 29 matches.
In 2008, because of financial problems, Reutov was disbanded and Sarkisov moved to Lokomotiv-2 Moscow. For two seasons, he became the best scorer of the team, and for the 2010 Russian Second Division season, Sarkisov was named the best forward of the West zone and became the division leading scorer, scoring 21 goals.

=== Lokomotiv Moscow ===
His vivid game in Lokomotiv-2 has not gone unnoticed by the heads of the first team, and on 9 December 2010, Artur signed a contract with parent club Lokomotiv Moscow for eighteen months. Sarkisov's dream of playing for the Russian Premier League had come true. Under the guidance of new head coach of Lokomotiv Yuri Krasnozhan, he spent only one camp in preparation of the 2011 season. In March, his Lokomotiv contract was extended to three years and he was loaned for the 2011–12 season to Shinnik.

=== Shinnik Yaroslavl ===
Sarkisov played his first match for Shinnik on 4 April against FC Khimki. Sarkisov was coming in on 64 minutes, replacing Eldar Nizamutdinov. On 25 April, he opened his bombarding score vs Alania at the 48th minute of play. As a result, the meeting ended in a draw 2-2. At the end of the season, Sarkisov was the second top scorer of Shinnik.

=== Volga Nizhny Novgorod ===
On 23 July 2012, Sarkisov was loaned out by Lokomotiv to Volga Nizhny Novgorod, where he played under number 14. Sarkisov scored his first two goals for the club in his tenth game for Volga on 15 March 2013. The final score was 2–1, thus Volga won because of Sarkisov's two goals.

=== Ural Sverdlovsk Oblast ===
In July 2013 Lokomotiv reached an agreement with Ural Sverdlovsk Oblast for full transfer of Sarkisov. In 13 matches for his new club in Premier League Sarkisov scored once - the winning goal vs Tom on Matchday 4. After first part of 2013–2014 season, Sarkisov was transfer-listed.

=== Volga Nizhny Novgorod (second spell) ===
In February 2014, Ural announced Sarkisov's transfer to RFPL rivals Volga Nizhny Novgorod, where he played in previous season.

== International career ==
Sarkisov had wanted very much to play for the Armenia national football team. When he was invited, he agreed without thinking for a minute. He joined the national team on 27 July 2011 and made his debut in a friendly match against Lithuania on 10 August 2011, coming on the field and in the starting lineup in the 58th minute and substituting Yura Movsisyan. His first goal for the national team had already in his third game with Slovakia on 6 September, which Armenia won away with a crushing 4–0 victory. On 7 September 2012, Sarkisov scored a goal for the national team in an away match against Malta.

== Personal life ==
Artur's family name Sarkisov is the Russified version of the Armenian surname Sargsyan. His ancestors had already Russianised themselves many years ago and he did not wish to restore the Sargsyan surname out of respect for them.

He lived with his family for the first three years of his life in Grozny. The family then moved to the city Sosensky, Kozelsky District. Artur and his brother engaged in athletics in Moscow when Artur was in the sixth grade. They specialized in the 60 meters sprint. Artur became more immersed in football. He later stated football taught him to live. His brother is the 60-meter sprint champion of Russia. Artur always celebrates New Year at home with his family. Sarkisov has recently started learning how to speak Armenian.

Artur and his wife Olga studied at the same school. He was 16 when they met. They got married on 15 April 2011. The couple has a son named Artyom.

Artur has the same birthday as fellow Armenian national member Edgar Manucharyan.

== Career statistics ==
Scores and results list Armenia's goal tally first.

No	Date	Venue	Opponent	Score	Result	Competition
1.	6 September 2011	Štadión pod Dubňom, Žilina, Slovakia	Slovakia	4–0	4–0	UEFA Euro 2012 qualifying
2.	7 October 2011	Vazgen Sargsyan Republican Stadium, Yerevan, Armenia	North Macedonia	4–1	4–1	UEFA Euro 2012 qualifying
3.	7 September 2012	Ta' Qali National Stadium, Ta' Qali, Malta	Malta	1–0	1–0	2014 FIFA World Cup qualification
4.	31 May 2013	Stade Tourbillon, Sion, Switzerland	Algeria	1–3	1–3	Friendly
5.	28 May 2016	StubHub Center, Los Angeles, United States	Guatemala	6–1	6–1	Friendly
6.	4 June 2017	Vazgen Sargsyan Republican Stadium, Yerevan, Armenia	Saint Kitts and Nevis	4–0	5–0	Friendly

== Honours ==
Lokomotiv-2 Moscow

- Russian Second Division Zone West Top Goalscorer: 2010 (21 goals)
- Russian Second Division Best Zone West Striker (1): 2010

Individual

- Lokomotiv-2 Moscow Top Goalscorer (2): 2009, 2010
- Shinnik Footballer of Spring (1): 2012
