= Ilya Abayev =

Russian professional football goalkeeper

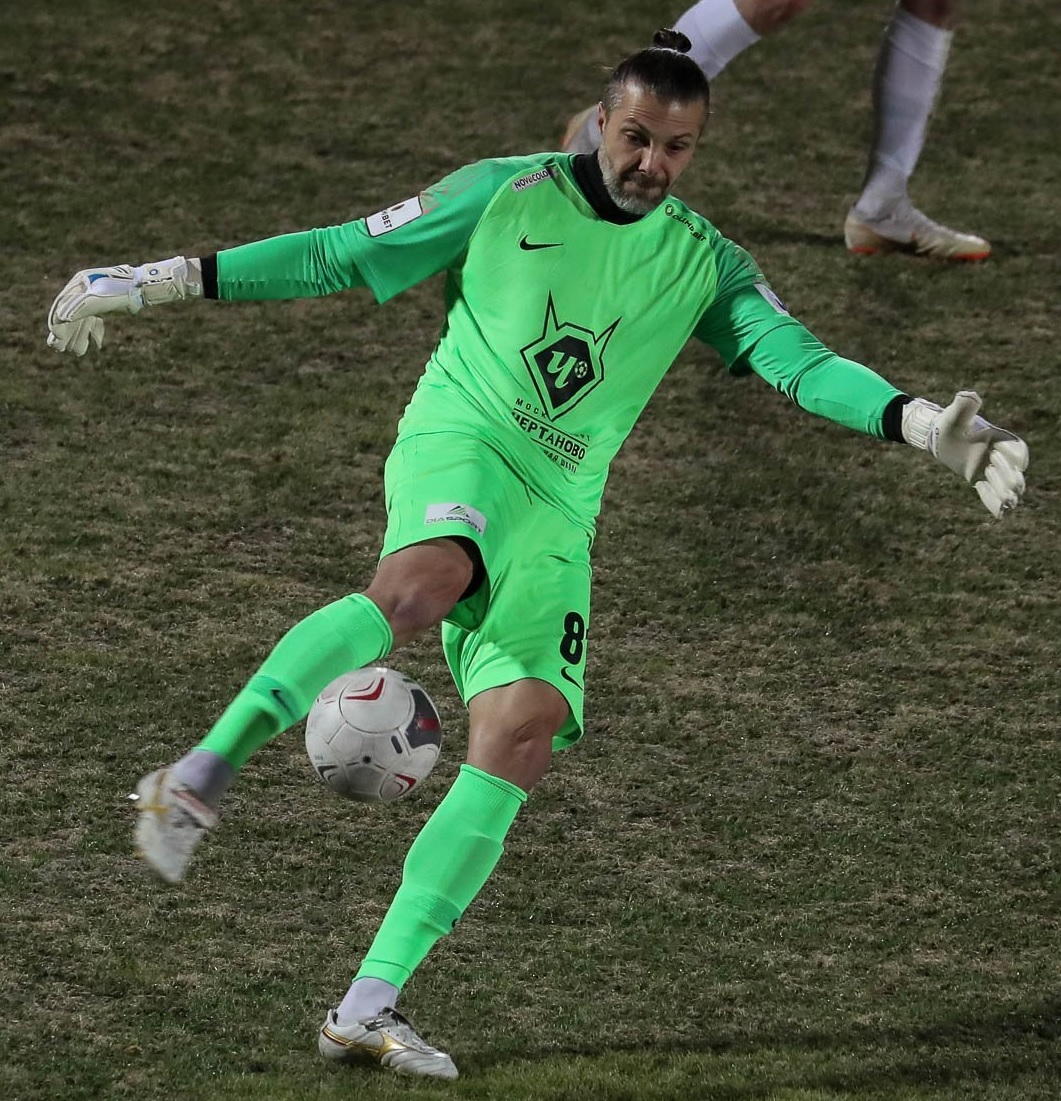
- Abayev with Chertanovo in 2021

Personal information
- Full name: Ilya Viktorovich Abayev
- Date of birth: 2 August 1981 (age 45)
- Place of birth: Moscow, Russian SFSR
- Height: 1.93 m (6 ft 4 in)
- Position: Goalkeeper

Team information
- Current team: FC Chertanovo Moscow (GK coach)

Youth career
- Chertanovo Education Center
- FC Torpedo Moscow

Senior career*
Years	Team	Apps	(Gls)
1999–2008	FC Torpedo Moscow	37	(0)
1999–2000	FC Torpedo-d	29	(0)
2006–2007	→ FC Anzhi Makhachkala (loan)	80	(0)
2009–2010	FC Anzhi Makhachkala	53	(0)
2011–2013	FC Volga Nizhny Novgorod	39	(0)
2013–2017	FC Lokomotiv Moscow	36	(0)
2017	→ FC Krasnodar (loan)	0	(0)
2017–2019	FC Rostov	24	(0)
2019–2021	FC Chertanovo Moscow	56	(0)
2021–2022	FC Olimp-Dolgoprudny	6	(0)

International career
2011	Russia-2	1	(0)

Managerial career
- 2024–: FC Chertanovo Moscow (GK coach)
- * Club domestic league appearances and goals

Ilya Viktorovich Abayev (Russian: Илья Викторович Абаев; born 2 August 1981) is a Russian professional football coach and a former goalkeeper. He is the goalkeepers' coach with FC Chertanovo Moscow.

== Club career ==
He made his debut in the Russian Premier League in 2004 for FC Torpedo Moscow.

=== Career statistics ===
As of 13 May 2018

Club	Season	League			Cup		Continental		Other		Total	
Club	Season	Division	Apps	Goals	Apps	Goals	Apps	Goals	Apps	Goals	Apps	Goals
FC Torpedo-d Moscow	1999	PFL	4	0	–		–		–		4	0
FC Torpedo-d Moscow	2000	PFL	25	0	–		–		–		25	0
FC Torpedo-d Moscow	Total		29	0	0	0	0	0	0	0	29	0
FC Torpedo Moscow	1999	Russian Premier League	0	0	0	0	–		–		0	0
FC Torpedo Moscow	2000	Russian Premier League	0	0	0	0	0	0	–		0	0
FC Torpedo Moscow	2001	Russian Premier League	0	0	0	0	0	0	–		0	0
FC Torpedo Moscow	2002	Russian Premier League	0	0	0	0	–		–		0	0
FC Torpedo Moscow	2003	Russian Premier League	0	0	0	0	0	0	2 (Note: Two appearances in the Russian Premier League Cup)	0	2	0
FC Torpedo Moscow	2004	Russian Premier League	2	0	1	0	–		–		3	0
FC Torpedo Moscow	2005	Russian Premier League	0	0	1	0	–		–		1	0
FC Anzhi Makhachkala	2006	FNL	39	0	1	0	–		–		40	0
FC Anzhi Makhachkala	2007	FNL	41	0	0	0	–		–		41	0
FC Torpedo Moscow	2008	FNL	35	0	0	0	–		–		35	0
FC Torpedo Moscow	Total (2 spells)		37	0	2	0	0	0	2	0	41	0
FC Anzhi Makhachkala	2009	FNL	37	0	0	0	–		–		37	0
FC Anzhi Makhachkala	2010	Russian Premier League	16	0	1	0	–		–		17	0
FC Anzhi Makhachkala	Total (2 spells)		133	0	2	0	0	0	2	0	135	0
FC Volga Nizhny Novgorod	2011–12	Russian Premier League	25	0	1	0	–		–		26	0
FC Volga Nizhny Novgorod	2012–13	Russian Premier League	11	0	0	0	–		–		11	0
FC Volga Nizhny Novgorod	2013–14	Russian Premier League	3	0	0	0	–		–		3	0
FC Volga Nizhny Novgorod	Total		39	0	1	0	0	0	2	0	40	0
FC Lokomotiv Moscow	2013–14	Russian Premier League	24	0	0	0	–		–		24	0
FC Lokomotiv Moscow	2014–15	Russian Premier League	11	0	2	0	0	0	–		13	0
FC Lokomotiv Moscow	2015–16	Russian Premier League	0	0	2	0	0	0	–		2	0
FC Lokomotiv Moscow	2016–17	Russian Premier League	1	0	1	0	0	0	–		2	0
FC Lokomotiv Moscow	Total		36	0	5	0	0	0	0	0	41	0
FC Krasnodar	2016–17	Russian Premier League	0	0	–		–		–		0	0
FC Rostov	2017–18	Russian Premier League	13	0	0	0	–		–		13	0
Career total			287	0	10	0	0	0	2	0	299	0

=== Notes ===
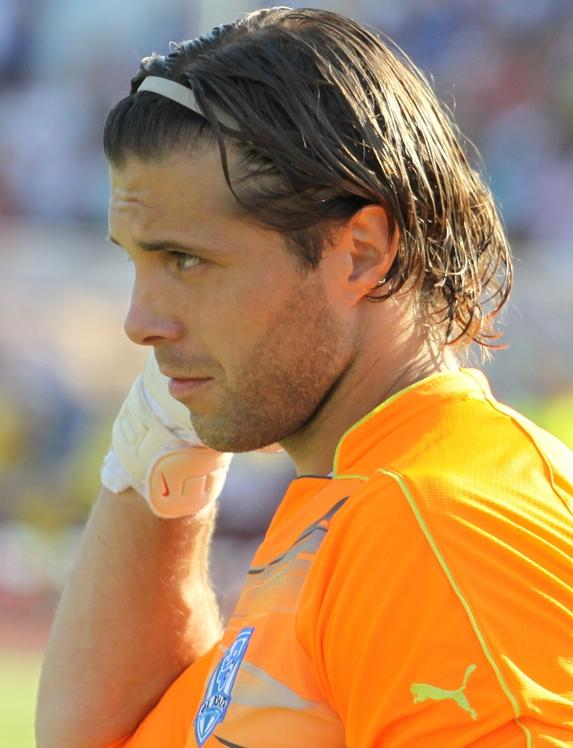
Abayev with Volga NN in 2011

== Honours ==
Lokomotiv Moscow

- Russian Cup: 2014–15, 2016-17
