= Mulumba Mukendi =

Democratic Republic of the Congo footballer

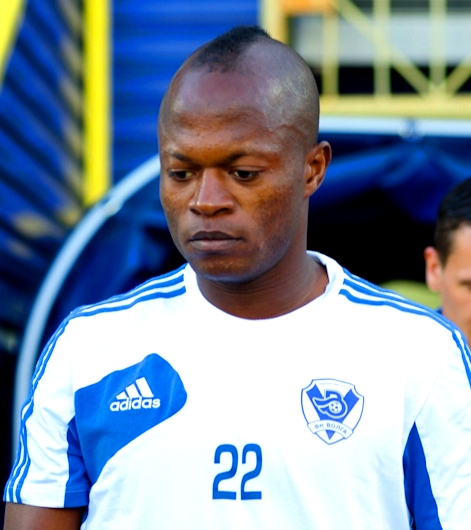

Personal information
- Full name: Mulumba Calvin Mukendi
- Date of birth: 27 May 1985 (age 41)
- Place of birth: Mbuji-Mayi, Zaire (now DR Congo)
- Height: 1.93 m (6 ft 4 in)
- Position: Forward

Senior career*
Years	Team	Apps	(Gls)
2003–2004	Saint George		
2005–2006	AmaZulu		
2007–2008	Durban Stars		
2008–2012	Cape Town		
2012–2013	Ružomberok	20	(6)
2013–2014	Volga Nizhny Novgorod	16	(2)
2014	Senica	4	(0)
2015	Příbram	0	(0)
2015	FC Jelka	4	(0)
2016	VSS Košice	12	(5)
2019	FK Kechnec		
- * Club domestic league appearances and goals

Mulumba Calvin Mukendi (born 27 May 1985) is a former professional footballer from DR Congo who played as a forward.

== Career ==
=== MFK Ružomberok ===
In July 2012, Mukendi joined Slovak club Ružomberok on a two-year contract. He made his debut for Ružomberok against Tatran Prešov on 4 August 2012.

=== Volga Nizhny Novgorod ===
In June 2013, Mukendi joined the Russian club Volga Nizhny Novgorod.

=== FC VSS Košice ===
On 17 February 2016, he signed a contract with VSS Košice.
