= Artyom Danilenko =

Russian footballer (born 1990)

Personal information
- Full name: Artyom Leonidovich Danilenko
- Date of birth: 22 March 1990 (age 36)
- Place of birth: Pravdinsk, Russian SFSR
- Height: 1.89 m (6 ft 2 in)
- Position: Forward

Senior career*
Years	Team	Apps	(Gls)
2008	FC Sportakademklub Moscow	1	(0)
2009	FC Nizhny Novgorod	0	(0)
2010	FC Nizhny Novgorod	15	(2)
2011–2013	FC Khimik Dzerzhinsk	64	(12)
2013–2015	FC Volga Nizhny Novgorod	23	(3)
2015–2016	FC Olimpiyets Nizhny Novgorod	25	(4)
- * Club domestic league appearances and goals

Artyom Leonidovich Danilenko (Russian: Артём Леонидович Даниленко; born 22 March 1990) is a Russian former professional football player.
