= Dmitri Yashin (footballer, born 1981) =

Russian footballer

Personal information
- Full name: Dmitri Vladimirovich Yashin
- Date of birth: 27 October 1981 (age 45)
- Place of birth: Tashkent, Uzbek SSR
- Height: 1.90 m (6 ft 3 in)
- Position: Goalkeeper

Senior career*
Years	Team	Apps	(Gls)
1998–2003	FC Volga Ulyanovsk	62	(0)
2004–2005	FC Lada Togliatti	14	(0)
2006	FC Kuban Krasnodar	0	(0)
2006	FC Dynamo Makhachkala	17	(0)
2007–2009	FC KAMAZ Naberezhnye Chelny	76	(0)
2010–2013	FC Ural Sverdlovsk Oblast	22	(0)
2013–2021	FC Shinnik Yaroslavl	183	(0)
2021	FC Krasava	15	(0)
- * Club domestic league appearances and goals

Dmitri Vladimirovich Yashin (Russian: Дмитрий Владимирович Яшин; born 27 October 1981) is a Russian former professional footballer.

== Club career ==
He made his professional debut in the Russian Second Division in 1999 for FC Volga Ulyanovsk.

He made his Russian Football National League debut for FC Dynamo Makhachkala on 14 August 2006 in a game against FC Metallurg Krasnoyarsk.
