= Igor Belyakov =

Russian football player

Personal information
- Full name: Igor Igorevich Belyakov
- Date of birth: 25 April 1994 (age 32)
- Place of birth: Kurgan, Russia
- Height: 1.91 m (6 ft 3 in)
- Position: Forward

Senior career*
Years	Team	Apps	(Gls)
2012–2013	Volga Nizhny Novgorod	0	(0)
2013–2014	Sever Murmansk	2	(0)
2014	Nizhny Novgorod (amateur)		
2015–2018	Nizhny Novgorod	82	(14)
2018	Murom	12	(3)
2019	Urozhay Krasnodar	11	(2)
2019–2021	Chelyabinsk	39	(16)
2021	Tom Tomsk	0	(0)
2021–2022	Volga Ulyanovsk	28	(7)
2022–2024	Khimik Dzerzhinsk	50	(13)
2024–2025	Volna Nizhny Novgorod Oblast	31	(12)
- * Club domestic league appearances and goals as of 7 September 2025

Igor Igorevich Belyakov (Russian: Игорь Игоревич Беляков; born 25 April 1994) is a Russian football player.

== Club career ==
He made his debut in the Russian Professional Football League for Sever Murmansk on 4 September 2013 in a game against Tosno.

He made his Russian Football National League debut for Olimpiyets Nizhny Novgorod on 8 July 2017 in a game against Avangard Kursk.
