= Stepnoy =

Stepny (Russian: Степно́й; masculine), Stepnaya (Степна́я; feminine), or Stepnoye (Степно́е; neuter) is the name of several inhabited localities in Russia.

== Altai Krai ==
As of 2010, ten rural localities in Altai Krai bear this name:

- Stepnoy, Biysky District, Altai Krai, a settlement in Shebalinsky Selsoviet of Biysky District
- Stepnoy, Loktevsky District, Altai Krai, a settlement in Kirovsky Selsoviet of Loktevsky District
- Stepnoy, Pervomaysky District, Altai Krai, a settlement in Sorochelogovskoy Selsoviet of Pervomaysky District
- Stepnoy, Topchikhinsky District, Altai Krai, a settlement in Pobedimsky Selsoviet of Topchikhinsky District
- Stepnoy, Tretyakovsky District, Altai Krai, a settlement in Sadovy Selsoviet of Tretyakovsky District
- Stepnoy, Troitsky District, Altai Krai, a settlement in Zelenopolyansky Selsoviet of Troitsky District
- Stepnoy, Ust-Kalmansky District, Altai Krai, a settlement in Charyshsky Selsoviet of Ust-Kalmansky District
- Stepnoye, Rodinsky District, Altai Krai, a selo in Stepnovsky Selsoviet of Rodinsky District
- Stepnoye, Smolensky District, Altai Krai, a selo in Kirovsky Selsoviet of Smolensky District
- Stepnoye, Soloneshensky District, Altai Krai, a selo in Stepnoy Selsoviet of Soloneshensky District

== Astrakhan Oblast ==
As of 2010, one rural locality in Astrakhan Oblast bears this name:

- Stepnoy, Astrakhan Oblast, a settlement in Stepnovsky Selsoviet of Krasnoyarsky District

== Republic of Bashkortostan ==
As of 2010, two rural localities in the Republic of Bashkortostan bear this name:

- Stepnoy, Khaybullinsky District, Republic of Bashkortostan, a selo in Akyarsky Selsoviet of Khaybullinsky District
- Stepnoy, Mechetlinsky District, Republic of Bashkortostan, a village in Bolsheokinsky Selsoviet of Mechetlinsky District

== Belgorod Oblast ==
As of 2010, two rural localities in Belgorod Oblast bear this name:

- Stepnoye, Gubkinsky District, Belgorod Oblast, a settlement in Gubkinsky District
- Stepnoye, Krasnoyaruzhsky District, Belgorod Oblast, a settlement in Krasnoyaruzhsky District

== Bryansk Oblast ==
As of 2010, one rural locality in Bryansk Oblast bears this name:

- Stepnoy, Bryansk Oblast, a settlement in Divovsky Selsoviet of Mglinsky District

== Republic of Buryatia ==
As of 2010, two rural localities in the Republic of Buryatia bear this name:

- Stepnoy, Ulan-Ude, Republic of Buryatia, a selo under the administrative jurisdiction of the urban-type settlement of Zarechny under the administrative jurisdiction of the city of republic significance of Ulan-Ude
- Stepnoy, Mukhorshibirsky District, Republic of Buryatia, a settlement in Tugnuysky Selsoviet of Mukhorshibirsky District

== Chelyabinsk Oblast ==
As of 2010, five rural localities in Chelyabinsk Oblast bear this name:

- Stepnoy, Bredinsky District, Chelyabinsk Oblast, a settlement in Atamanovsky Selsoviet of Bredinsky District
- Stepnoy, Kizilsky District, Chelyabinsk Oblast, a settlement in Zingeysky Selsoviet of Kizilsky District
- Stepnoy, Krasnoarmeysky District, Chelyabinsk Oblast, a settlement in Petrovsky Selsoviet of Krasnoarmeysky District
- Stepnoye, Plastovsky District, Chelyabinsk Oblast, a selo in Stepninsky Selsoviet of Plastovsky District
- Stepnoye, Verkhneuralsky District, Chelyabinsk Oblast, a selo in Stepnoy Selsoviet of Verkhneuralsky District

== Republic of Dagestan ==
As of 2010, one rural locality in the Republic of Dagestan bears this name:

- Stepnoye, Republic of Dagestan, a selo in Novokokhanovsky Selsoviet of Kizlyarsky District

== Irkutsk Oblast ==
As of 2010, three rural localities in Irkutsk Oblast bear this name:

- Stepnoy, Kuytunsky District, Irkutsk Oblast, a settlement in Kuytunsky District
- Stepnoy, Usolsky District, Irkutsk Oblast, a settlement in Usolsky District
- Stepnoye, Irkutsk Oblast, a settlement in Nukutsky District

== Jewish Autonomous Oblast ==
As of 2010, one rural locality in the Jewish Autonomous Oblast bears this name:

- Stepnoye, Jewish Autonomous Oblast, a selo in Leninsky District

== Kabardino-Balkar Republic ==
As of 2010, one rural locality in the Kabardino-Balkar Republic bears this name:

- Stepnoye, Kabardino-Balkar Republic, a selo in Prokhladnensky District

== Kaliningrad Oblast ==
As of 2010, three rural localities in Kaliningrad Oblast bear this name:

- Stepnoye, Kaluzhsky Rural Okrug, Chernyakhovsky District, Kaliningrad Oblast, a settlement in Kaluzhsky Rural Okrug of Chernyakhovsky District
- Stepnoye, Svobodnensky Rural Okrug, Chernyakhovsky District, Kaliningrad Oblast, a settlement in Svobodnensky Rural Okrug of Chernyakhovsky District
- Stepnoye, Guryevsky District, Kaliningrad Oblast, a settlement in Khrabrovsky Rural Okrug of Guryevsky District

== Republic of Kalmykia ==
As of 2010, one rural locality in the Republic of Kalmykia bears this name:

- Stepnoy, Republic of Kalmykia, a settlement in Khulkhutinskaya Rural Administration of Yashkulsky District

== Kemerovo Oblast ==
As of 2010, two rural localities in Kemerovo Oblast bear this name:

- Stepnoy, Belovsky District, Kemerovo Oblast, a settlement in Vishnevskaya Rural Territory of Belovsky District
- Stepnoy, Mezhdurechensky District, Kemerovo Oblast, a settlement in Ilyinskaya Rural Territory of Mezhdurechensky District

== Kirov Oblast ==
As of 2010, one rural locality in Kirov Oblast bears this name:

- Stepnaya, Kirov Oblast, a village in Kanakhinsky Rural Okrug of Uninsky District

== Krasnodar Krai ==
As of 2010, thirteen rural localities in Krasnodar Krai bear this name:

- Stepnoy, Belorechensky District, Krasnodar Krai, a settlement in Rodnikovsky Rural Okrug of Belorechensky District
- Stepnoy, Kalininsky District, Krasnodar Krai, a khutor in Kuybyshevsky Rural Okrug of Kalininsky District
- Stepnoy, Kanevskoy District, Krasnodar Krai, a settlement in Kubanskostepnoy Rural Okrug of Kanevskoy District
- Stepnoy, Kavkazsky District, Krasnodar Krai, a settlement in Losevsky Rural Okrug of Kavkazsky District
- Stepnoy, Kurganinsky District, Krasnodar Krai, a settlement in Bezvodny Rural Okrug of Kurganinsky District
- Stepnoy, Lyapinsky Rural Okrug, Novokubansky District, Krasnodar Krai, a settlement in Lyapinsky Rural Okrug of Novokubansky District
- Stepnoy, Novoselsky Rural Okrug, Novokubansky District, Krasnodar Krai, a settlement in Novoselsky Rural Okrug of Novokubansky District
- Stepnoy, Novopokrovsky District, Krasnodar Krai, a settlement in Pokrovsky Rural Okrug of Novopokrovsky District
- Stepnoy, Slavyansky District, Krasnodar Krai, a settlement in Pribrezhny Rural Okrug of Slavyansky District
- Stepnoy, Tikhoretsky District, Krasnodar Krai, a settlement in Parkovsky Rural Okrug of Tikhoretsky District
- Stepnoy, Yeysky District, Krasnodar Krai, a settlement in Alexandrovsky Rural Okrug of Yeysky District
- Stepnoye, Krasnodar Krai, a selo in Stepnyansky Rural Okrug of Kushchevsky District
- Stepnaya, Krasnodar Krai, a stanitsa in Stepnoy Rural Okrug of Primorsko-Akhtarsky District

== Krasnoyarsk Krai ==
As of 2010, one rural locality in Krasnoyarsk Krai bears this name:

- Stepnoy, Krasnoyarsk Krai, a settlement in Stepnovsky Selsoviet of Nazarovsky District

== Kurgan Oblast ==
As of 2010, two rural localities in Kurgan Oblast bear this name:

- Stepnoye, Kurtamyshsky District, Kurgan Oblast, a village in Pesyansky Selsoviet of Kurtamyshsky District
- Stepnoye, Makushinsky District, Kurgan Oblast, a selo in Stepnovsky Selsoviet of Makushinsky District

== Kursk Oblast ==
As of 2010, one rural locality in Kursk Oblast bears this name:

- Stepnoy, Kursk Oblast, a settlement in Lebyazhensky Selsoviet of Kursky District

== Republic of North Ossetia–Alania ==
As of 2010, one rural locality in the Republic of North Ossetia–Alania bears this name:

- Stepnoy, Republic of North Ossetia–Alania, a settlement under the administrative jurisdiction of Ardon Urban Settlement of Ardonsky District

== Novosibirsk Oblast ==
As of 2010, four rural localities in Novosibirsk Oblast bear this name:

- Stepnoy, Iskitimsky District, Novosibirsk Oblast, a settlement in Iskitimsky District
- Stepnoy, Krasnozyorsky District, Novosibirsk Oblast, a settlement in Krasnozyorsky District
- Stepnoy, Novosibirsky District, Novosibirsk Oblast, a settlement in Novosibirsky District
- Stepnoy, Ordynsky District, Novosibirsk Oblast, a settlement in Ordynsky District

== Omsk Oblast ==
As of 2010, three rural localities in Omsk Oblast bear this name:

- Stepnoye, Maryanovsky District, Omsk Oblast, a selo in Stepninsky Rural Okrug of Maryanovsky District
- Stepnoye, Pavlogradsky District, Omsk Oblast, a village in Yuzhny Rural Okrug of Pavlogradsky District
- Stepnoye, Russko-Polyansky District, Omsk Oblast, a village in Sibirsky Rural Okrug of Russko-Polyansky District

== Orenburg Oblast ==
As of 2010, five rural localities in Orenburg Oblast bear this name:

- Stepnoy, Kinzelsky Selsoviet, Krasnogvardeysky District, Orenburg Oblast, a settlement in Kinzelsky Selsoviet of Krasnogvardeysky District
- Stepnoy, Sverdlovsky Selsoviet, Krasnogvardeysky District, Orenburg Oblast, a settlement in Sverdlovsky Selsoviet of Krasnogvardeysky District
- Stepnoy, Svetlinsky District, Orenburg Oblast, a settlement in Stepnoy Selsoviet of Svetlinsky District
- Stepnoy, Tashlinsky District, Orenburg Oblast, a settlement in Stepnoy Selsoviet of Tashlinsky District
- Stepnoye, Orenburg Oblast, a selo in Privolny Selsoviet of Ileksky District

== Oryol Oblast ==
As of 2010, three rural localities in Oryol Oblast bear this name:

- Stepnoy, Oryol Oblast, a settlement in Mokhovsky Selsoviet of Zalegoshchensky District
- Stepnoye, Oryol Oblast, a village in Yakovlevsky Selsoviet of Sverdlovsky District
- Stepnaya, Oryol Oblast, a village in Senkovsky Selsoviet of Glazunovsky District

== Penza Oblast ==
As of 2010, one rural locality in Penza Oblast bears this name:

- Stepnoy, Penza Oblast, a settlement in Volche-Vrazhsky Selsoviet of Tamalinsky District

== Primorsky Krai ==
As of 2010, three rural localities in Primorsky Krai bear this name:

- Stepnoye, Ussuriysk, Primorsky Krai, a selo under the administrative jurisdiction of the Ussuriysk City Under Krai Jurisdiction
- Stepnoye, Mikhaylovsky District, Primorsky Krai, a selo in Mikhaylovsky District
- Stepnoye, Spassky District, Primorsky Krai, a selo in Spassky District

== Rostov Oblast ==
As of 2010, six rural localities in Rostov Oblast bear this name:

- Stepnoy, Aksaysky District, Rostov Oblast, a settlement in Rassvetovskoye Rural Settlement of Aksaysky District
- Stepnoy, Martynovsky District, Rostov Oblast, a khutor in Novoselovskoye Rural Settlement of Martynovsky District
- Stepnoy, Oktyabrsky District, Rostov Oblast, a khutor in Kerchikskoye Rural Settlement of Oktyabrsky District
- Stepnoy, Proletarsky District, Rostov Oblast, a khutor in Nikolayevskoye Rural Settlement of Proletarsky District
- Stepnoy, Volgodonskoy District, Rostov Oblast, a khutor in Potapovskoye Rural Settlement of Volgodonskoy District
- Stepnoye, Rostov Oblast, a selo in Yulovskoye Rural Settlement of Tselinsky District

== Samara Oblast ==
As of 2010, two rural localities in Samara Oblast bear this name:

- Stepnoy, Bolsheglushitsky District, Samara Oblast, a settlement in Bolsheglushitsky District
- Stepnoy, Koshkinsky District, Samara Oblast, a settlement in Koshkinsky District

== Saratov Oblast ==
As of 2010, ten inhabited localities in Saratov Oblast bear this name:

Urban localities

- Stepnoye, Sovetsky District, Saratov Oblast, a work settlement in Sovetsky District

Rural localities

- Stepnoy, Dergachyovsky District, Saratov Oblast, a settlement in Dergachyovsky District
- Stepnoy (khutor), Novouzensky District, Saratov Oblast, a khutor in Novouzensky District
- Stepnoy (settlement), Novouzensky District, Saratov Oblast, a settlement in Novouzensky District
- Stepnoy, Perelyubsky District, Saratov Oblast, a settlement in Perelyubsky District
- Stepnoy, Pugachyovsky District, Saratov Oblast, a settlement in Pugachyovsky District
- Stepnoye, Balashovsky District, Saratov Oblast, a settlement in Balashovsky District
- Stepnoye, Engelssky District, Saratov Oblast, a selo in Engelssky District
- Stepnoye, Kalininsky District, Saratov Oblast, a settlement in Kalininsky District
- Stepnoye, Marksovsky District, Saratov Oblast, a selo in Marksovsky District

== Stavropol Krai ==
As of 2010, five rural localities in Stavropol Krai bear this name:

- Stepnoy, Arzgirsky District, Stavropol Krai, a settlement in Novoromanovsky Selsoviet of Arzgirsky District
- Stepnoy, Kochubeyevsky District, Stavropol Krai, a khutor in Mishchensky Selsoviet of Kochubeyevsky District
- Stepnoy, Levokumsky District, Stavropol Krai, a settlement in Vladimirovsky Selsoviet of Levokumsky District
- Stepnoy, Shpakovsky District, Stavropol Krai, a settlement in Tsimlyansky Selsoviet of Shpakovsky District
- Stepnoye, Stavropol Krai, a selo in Stepnovsky Selsoviet of Stepnovsky District

== Sverdlovsk Oblast ==
As of 2010, one rural locality in Sverdlovsk Oblast bears this name:

- Stepnoy, Sverdlovsk Oblast, a settlement in Kamensky District

== Tambov Oblast ==
As of 2010, three rural localities in Tambov Oblast bear this name:

- Stepnoy, Bondarsky District, Tambov Oblast, a settlement in Nashchekinsky Selsoviet of Bondarsky District
- Stepnoy, Mordovsky District, Tambov Oblast, a settlement in Ivanovsky Selsoviet of Mordovsky District
- Stepnoy, Zherdevsky District, Tambov Oblast, a settlement in Demyanovsky Selsoviet of Zherdevsky District

== Tula Oblast ==
As of 2010, three rural localities in Tula Oblast bear this name:

- Stepnoy, Chernsky District, Tula Oblast, a settlement in Fedorovskaya Rural Administration of Chernsky District
- Stepnoy, Kurkinsky District, Tula Oblast, a settlement in Ivanovskaya Volost of Kurkinsky District
- Stepnoy, Yefremovsky District, Tula Oblast, a settlement in Stepnokhutorskoy Rural Okrug of Yefremovsky District

== Tyumen Oblast ==
As of 2010, two rural localities in Tyumen Oblast bear this name:

- Stepnoy, Tyumen Oblast, a settlement in Zavodoukovsky District
- Stepnoye, Tyumen Oblast, a selo in Stepnovsky Rural Okrug of Sladkovsky District

== Udmurt Republic ==
As of 2010, one rural locality in the Udmurt Republic bears this name:

- Stepnoy, Udmurt Republic, a village in Olenye-Bolotinsky Selsoviet of Sarapulsky District

== Volgograd Oblast ==
As of 2010, five rural localities in Volgograd Oblast bear this name:

- Stepnoy, Gorodishchensky District, Volgograd Oblast, a settlement in Rossoshensky Selsoviet of Gorodishchensky District
- Stepnoy, Kalachyovsky District, Volgograd Oblast, a khutor in Sovetsky Selsoviet of Kalachyovsky District
- Stepnoy, Leninsky District, Volgograd Oblast, a settlement in Stepnovsky Selsoviet of Leninsky District
- Stepnoy, Novonikolayevsky District, Volgograd Oblast, a khutor in Khopersky Selsoviet of Novonikolayevsky District
- Stepnoy, Uryupinsky District, Volgograd Oblast, a khutor in Krasnyansky Selsoviet of Uryupinsky District

== Voronezh Oblast ==
As of 2010, two rural localities in Voronezh Oblast bear this name:

- Stepnoy, Voronezh Oblast, a settlement in Mozhayskoye Rural Settlement of Kashirsky District
- Stepnoye, Voronezh Oblast, a settlement in Stepnyanskoye Rural Settlement of Olkhovatsky District

== Zabaykalsky Krai ==
As of 2010, one rural locality in Zabaykalsky Krai bears this name:

- Stepnoy, Zabaykalsky Krai, a settlement in Zabaykalsky District

== See also ==
- Stepnovsky (disambiguation)
