= List of Russian football transfers winter 2010–11 =

This is a list of Russian football transfers in the winter transfer window 2010–11 by club. Only clubs of the 2010 and 2011–12 Russian Premier League are included.

== Russian Premier League 2010 ==
=== Alania Vladikavkaz ===
In: Note: Flags indicate national team as defined under FIFA eligibility rules; some limited exceptions apply. Players may hold more than one non-FIFA nationality.

No.	Pos.	Nation	Player
4	DF	RUS	Aslan Dudiyev (from Akademiya Togliatti)
7	MF	RUS	Roland Gigolayev (from Zenit St. Petersburg)
11	FW	BRA	Danilo Neco (from (Brazil) Ponte Preta)
16	DF	RUS	Anton Grigoryev (from CSKA Moscow)
21	FW	RUS	German Tuayev (from FAYUR Beslan)
30	FW	BRA	Vandinho (from (Brazil) Desportivo Brasil)
36	DF	RUS	Dmitri Grachyov (from Saturn Moscow Oblast)

Out: Note: Flags indicate national team as defined under FIFA eligibility rules; some limited exceptions apply. Players may hold more than one non-FIFA nationality.

No.	Pos.	Nation	Player
3	DF	RUS	Valeri Tskhovrebov (to Alania-d Vladikavkaz)
5	MF	ROU	Gheorghe Florescu (released)
7	FW	RUS	Karen Oganyan (released)
14	FW	RUS	Aleksandr Marenich (to Lokomotiv Moscow)
21	MF	RUS	Inal Pukhayev (to FAYUR Beslan)
23	DF	RUS	Alan Dzutsev (to Mashuk-KMV Pyatigorsk)
24	DF	TOG	Abdoul-Gafar Mamah (on loan to (Moldova) Dacia Chişinău)
29	MF	RUS	Shota Bibilov (to Volga Nizhny Novgorod)
34	DF	RUS	Nariman Gusalov (released)
35	DF	RUS	Aslan Doguzov (to Alania-d Vladikavkaz)
38	GK	RUS	Omar Tsopanov (to Alania-d Vladikavkaz)
39	DF	RUS	Soslan Kachmazov (to FAYUR Beslan)
43	DF	RUS	David Bugulov (to Alania-d Vladikavkaz)
44	MF	RUS	Georgi Dzantiyev (to Alania-d Vladikavkaz)
45	MF	RUS	Georgi Bulatsev (to Alania-d Vladikavkaz)
47	FW	RUS	Artur Khaymanov (to FC Sheksna Cherepovets)
51	MF	RUS	Artur Gazdanov (to Alania-d Vladikavkaz)
53	GK	RUS	Oleg Kudziyev (to FAYUR Beslan)
54	MF	RUS	Uruzmag Ikoyev (to Alania-d Vladikavkaz)
77	MF	RUS	Aleksandr Arsoyev (to Alania-d Vladikavkaz)
88	DF	RUS	Alan Bagayev (to FAYUR Beslan)
91	MF	RUS	Aleksandr Dzalayev (to Alania-d Vladikavkaz)
92	GK	RUS	Alan Khaliyev (to Alania-d Vladikavkaz)
—	MF	RUS	Soslan Dzhioyev (to Druzhba Maykop)
—	MF	RUS	Aleksandr Gagloyev (on loan to Gazovik Orenburg)

=== Amkar Perm ===
In: Note: Flags indicate national team as defined under FIFA eligibility rules; some limited exceptions apply. Players may hold more than one non-FIFA nationality.

No.	Pos.	Nation	Player
3	DF	SRB	Nikola Mijailović (from (Poland) Korona Kielce)
11	FW	MNE	Radomir Đalović (from (Croatia) Rijeka)
15	FW	SRB	Predrag Mijić (from (Serbia) Partizan)
16	DF	BIH	Samir Merzić (from (Slovakia) Senica)
20	MF	RUS	Artyom Molodtsov (from Saturn Moscow Oblast)
44	DF	RUS	Nikita Permyakov
49	FW	RUS	Timofei Sirotin
51	GK	RUS	Igor Stepanov (from Lokomotiv-2 Moscow)
84	MF	RUS	Danil Kochkin (from Sibir Novosibirsk)
88	GK	BLR	Vasil Khamutowski (from (Ukraine) Tavriya Simferopol)

Out: Note: Flags indicate national team as defined under FIFA eligibility rules; some limited exceptions apply. Players may hold more than one non-FIFA nationality.

No.	Pos.	Nation	Player
1	GK	RUS	Igor Usminskiy (to Krasnodar)
2	DF	RUS	Sergei Morozov (to Neftekhimik Nizhnekamsk)
9	FW	JPN	Seiichiro Maki (to (China) Shenzhen Ruby)
11	MF	RUS	Aleksei Pomerko (on loan to Lokomotiv-2 Moscow)
15	DF	HUN	Miklós Gaál (to Volga Nizhny Novgorod)
29	FW	BUL	Martin Kushev (to (Bulgaria) Slavia Sofia)
34	DF	RUS	Yevgeni Sitnikov (to Oktan Perm)
35	MF	RUS	Artur Gadzaov (released)
41	GK	RUS	Maksim Shumailov (on loan to Oktan Perm)
44	GK	RUS	Sergei Sinelnikov (to Energiya Volzhsky)
77	MF	RUS	Dmitri Sokolov (to Sokol Saratov)
88	MF	RUS	Vladislav Zakoptelov (to Oktan Perm)
90	MF	RUS	Maksim Magurov (released)
—	DF	RUS	Mikhail Makagonov (on loan to Oktan Perm)
—	FW	BRA	Jean Carlos (to (Brazil) Chapecoense)
—	FW	CRO	Edin Junuzović (to Dynamo Bryansk)

=== Anzhi Makhachkala ===
In: Note: Flags indicate national team as defined under FIFA eligibility rules; some limited exceptions apply. Players may hold more than one non-FIFA nationality.

No.	Pos.	Nation	Player
3	DF	BRA	Roberto Carlos (from (Brazil) Corinthians)
6	MF	MAR	Mbark Boussoufa (from (Belgium) Anderlecht)
8	MF	BRA	Jucilei (from (Brazil) Corinthians)
9	FW	BRA	Diego Tardelli (from (Brazil) Atlético Mineiro)
10	MF	RUS	Shamil Lakhiyalov (from Krasnodar)
15	MF	GEO	Irakli Klimiashvili (from (Georgia (country)) WIT Georgia)
16	MF	RUS	Viktor Kuzmichyov (from Saturn Moscow Oblast)
18	DF	CMR	Benoît Angbwa (from Saturn Moscow Oblast)
25	MF	UZB	Odil Ahmedov (on loan from (Uzbekistan) Pakhtakor Tashkent)
30	DF	BRA	João Carlos (from (Belgium) Genk)
31	FW	TOG	Arafat Djako (from (Israel) Hapoel Acre)
70	DF	RUS	Yuri Udunyan
77	GK	RUS	Aleksandr Makarov (from Saturn Moscow Oblast)
88	MF	RUS	Aleksei Ivanov (from Saturn Moscow Oblast)
89	FW	RUS	Aleksandr Prudnikov (on loan from Spartak Moscow)
90	MF	RUS	Makhach Gadzhiyev (from Saturn Moscow Oblast)
91	GK	RUS	Azamat Dzhioyev (from Spartak Moscow)

Out: Note: Flags indicate national team as defined under FIFA eligibility rules; some limited exceptions apply. Players may hold more than one non-FIFA nationality.

No.	Pos.	Nation	Player
1	GK	RUS	Ilya Abayev (to Volga Nizhny Novgorod)
6	MF	RUS	David Tsorayev (to Kuban Krasnodar)
8	MF	RUS	Andrei Streltsov (to Dynamo Bryansk)
9	FW	RUS	Magomed Magomedov (released)
14	MF	RUS	Dmitri Ivanov (on loan to Dagdizel Kaspiysk)
15	MF	MDA	Nicolae Josan (released)
16	FW	RUS	Dmitri Vasilyev (to Luch-Energiya Vladivostok)
19	MF	GEO	Zurab Arziani (on loan to (Georgia (country)) Dinamo Tbilisi)
23	MF	RUS	Shamil Burziyev (died in a car accident)
31	DF	SRB	Mitar Peković (released)
37	GK	UKR	Leonid Musin (to Ural Sverdlovsk Oblast)
40	DF	AZE	Mahir Shukurov (to (Azerbaijan) Gabala)
50	DF	RUS	Magomed Abidinov (to Dagdizel Kaspiysk)
77	DF	GEO	Otar Khizaneishvili (released)
86	MF	BUL	Todor Timonov (to (Bulgaria) Botev Plovdiv)
87	MF	RUS	Mikhail Pometsko (on loan to Dagdizel Kaspiysk)
89	DF	RUS	Akhmad Magomedov (to Dagdizel Kaspiysk)
90	DF	RUS	Gamzat Omarov (to Dagdizel Kaspiysk)
93	FW	RUS	Ruslan Aliyev (to Dagdizel Kaspiysk)
95	MF	RUS	Shamil Alimagomayev (to Mashuk-KMV Pyatigorsk)
99	GK	RUS	Abdulla Gadzhikadiyev (on loan to Dagdizel Kaspiysk)
—	MF	GEO	Gocha Khojava (to Volga Nizhny Novgorod)
—	FW	GEO	Otar Martsvaladze (to Volga Nizhny Novgorod)

=== CSKA Moscow ===
In: Note: Flags indicate national team as defined under FIFA eligibility rules; some limited exceptions apply. Players may hold more than one non-FIFA nationality.

No.	Pos.	Nation	Player
5	DF	RUS	Viktor Vasin (from Spartak Nalchik)
19	MF	LVA	Aleksandrs Cauņa (on loan from (Latvia) Skonto)
44	MF	RUS	Marsel Safin
54	DF	RUS	Stepan Ryabokon (from Rotor Volgograd)
52	MF	RUS	Ravil Netfullin (from Moscow)
55	MF	RUS	Batraz Khadartsev
56	MF	RUS	Suleyman Abdullin
77	DF	RUS	Pavel Drozdov
80	MF	RUS	David Khurtsidze
95	GK	RUS	Sergei Revyakin

Out: Note: Flags indicate national team as defined under FIFA eligibility rules; some limited exceptions apply. Players may hold more than one non-FIFA nationality.

No.	Pos.	Nation	Player
32	MF	RUS	Kirill Lapidus (to Volgar-Gazprom Astrakhan)
40	GK	RUS	Stanislav Plokhikh (to Avangard Kursk)
43	MF	RUS	Leonid Mushnikov (to Irtysh Omsk)
44	MF	RUS	Dmitri Zameshayev (released)
46	MF	RUS	Aleksandr Stolyarenko (to Akademiya Togliatti)
47	DF	RUS	Kirill Suslov (to Dynamo Barnaul)
51	MF	RUS	Aleksei Kiselyov (to Istra)
53	FW	RUS	Sergei Sipatov (to Krylia Sovetov Samara)
54	DF	SRB	Uroš Ćosić (on loan to (Serbia) Red Star Belgrade)
56	DF	RUS	Anatoli Stukalov (to (Kazakhstan) Tobol)
66	DF	RUS	Igor Dragunov (released)
77	GK	RUS	Artur Nigmatullin (on loan to Mordovia Saransk)
99	MF	RUS	Yevgeni Kobzar (released)
—	GK	RUS	Veniamin Mandrykin (retired)
—	GK	RUS	Yevgeny Pomazan (on loan to Spartak Nalchik)
—	DF	RUS	Anton Grigoryev (to Alania Vladikavkaz)
—	DF	RUS	Viktor Klimeyev (to Mashuk-KMV Pyatigorsk)
—	DF	RUS	Maksim Potapov (to Torpedo Armavir)
—	DF	RUS	Dmitri Protopopov (released)
—	DF	RUS	Andrei Vasyanovich (on loan to Zhemchuzhina-Sochi)
—	DF	RUS	Anton Vlasov (on loan to Gazovik Orenburg)
—	MF	RUS	Maksim Fyodorov (released)
—	MF	CZE	Luboš Kalouda (not registered)
—	MF	RUS	Aleksandr Kudryavtsev (to Gornyak Uchaly)
—	FW	POL	Dawid Janczyk (on loan to (Poland) Korona Kielce)
—	FW	BRA	Ricardo Jesus (on loan to (Brazil) Ponte Preta)
—	FW	NIG	Ouwo Moussa Maazou (on loan to (France) AS Monaco)
—	FW	RUS	Dmitri Ryzhov (on loan to Mordovia Saransk)
—	FW	RUS	Anton Zabolotny (on loan to Ural Sverdlovsk Oblast)

=== Dynamo Moscow ===
In: Note: Flags indicate national team as defined under FIFA eligibility rules; some limited exceptions apply. Players may hold more than one non-FIFA nationality.

No.	Pos.	Nation	Player
3	DF	FIN	Boris Rotenberg (from Zenit St. Petersburg)
7	MF	RUS	Andrei Karyaka (from Saturn Moscow Oblast)
8	MF	BIH	Zvjezdan Misimović (from (Turkey) Galatasaray)
35	GK	RUS	Roman Khalanchuk (from KUZBASS Kemerovo)
41	MF	RUS	Aleksandr Sapeta (from Saturn Moscow Oblast)
49	MF	RUS	Igor Khokhlov (from Nika Moscow)
54	GK	RUS	Yegor Generalov (from Lokomotiv Moscow)
56	MF	RUS	Vladimir Sobolev (from Saturn Moscow Oblast)
57	DF	RUS	Denis Rykhovskiy
70	MF	RUS	Roman Yeremeyev (from Akademiya Togliatti)
72	MF	RUS	Vladimir Torshentsev (from Saturn Moscow Oblast)
79	MF	RUS	Karen Akopyan (from Luch-Energiya Vladivostok)
86	MF	KOR	He Minen
89	FW	RUS	Yevgeni Kuklin
93	FW	RUS	Andrei Panyukov
95	MF	RUS	Mikhail Zhabkin
98	DF	RUS	Soslan Takazov
99	FW	RUS	Timur Kalizhanov

Out: Note: Flags indicate national team as defined under FIFA eligibility rules; some limited exceptions apply. Players may hold more than one non-FIFA nationality.

No.	Pos.	Nation	Player
3	MF	RUS	Aleksei Rebko (to Rostov)
4	DF	POL	Marcin Kowalczyk (on loan to (Ukraine) Metalurh Donetsk)
8	MF	RUS	Dmitri Khokhlov (retired)
26	FW	SVK	Martin Jakubko (to (Slovakia) Dukla Banská Bystrica)
34	GK	RUS	Sergei Panov (to Vityaz Podolsk)
37	DF	RUS	Aleksandr Lobkov (to Khimik Dzerzhinsk)
44	MF	RUS	Grigori Yevstegneyev (to Istra)
46	DF	RUS	Aleksandr Bortnik (released)
49	DF	RUS	Aleksandr Karakin (released)
57	MF	RUS	Vladimir Rykhovskiy (to Metallurg Lipetsk)
63	DF	RUS	Anton Rudakov (on loan to Dynamo Stavropol)
66	MF	RUS	Yevgeni Frolov (released)
70	MF	RUS	Dmitri Tikhonov (to Tom Tomsk)
73	MF	RUS	Yuri Petrakov (to (Moldova) Sheriff Tiraspol)
77	FW	RUS	Irakli Logua (on loan to Fakel Voronezh)
79	FW	RUS	Andrei Ornat (released)
80	FW	RUS	Ruslan Pashtov (to Volga Nizhny Novgorod)
81	MF	RUS	Andrei Zharkov (released)
88	MF	LTU	Edgaras Česnauskis (to Rostov)
89	FW	RUS	Aleksandr Bebikh (to Dynamo Stavropol)
92	FW	RUS	Vadim Pronkin
95	MF	RUS	Artyom Katashevsky (released)
—	GK	RUS	Aleksei Karasevich (to Lokomotiv-2 Moscow)
—	DF	RUS	Nikita Chicherin (on loan to Sibir Novosibirsk)
—	DF	RUS	Sergei Terekhov (on loan to Baltika Kaliningrad)
—	MF	URU	Luis Aguiar (on loan to (Uruguay) Peñarol)
—	MF	RUS	Yuri Kirillov (on loan to Krylia Sovetov Samara)
—	MF	RUS	Viktor Svezhov (to Luch-Energiya Vladivostok)
—	MF	RUS	Nail Zamaliyev (to (Moldova) Sheriff Tiraspol)
—	FW	BUL	Tsvetan Genkov (to (Poland) Wisła Kraków)
—	FW	RUS	Roman Panin (released)

=== Krylia Sovetov Samara ===
In: Note: Flags indicate national team as defined under FIFA eligibility rules; some limited exceptions apply. Players may hold more than one non-FIFA nationality.

No.	Pos.	Nation	Player
2	DF	RUS	Basel Abdoulfattakh (from Zenit St. Petersburg)
3	DF	BLR	Dmitry Molosh (from Sibir Novosibirsk)
8	MF	UKR	Volodymyr Priyomov (from (Ukraine) Oleksandria)
11	MF	RUS	Anton Sosnin (from Zenit St. Petersburg)
14	MF	RUS	Yuri Kirillov (on loan from Dynamo Moscow)
15	DF	RUS	Sergei Ponomarenko (from Nika Moscow)
19	FW	RUS	Marat Gubzhev (from Saturn Moscow Oblast)
20	MF	CAN	Joseph Di Chiara (first professional contract)
22	MF	RUS	Oleg Shalayev (from Spartak Nalchik)
27	FW	RUS	Sergei Sipatov (from CSKA Moscow)
33	FW	RUS	Roman Kasyanov (from Akademiya Tolyatti)
42	MF	RUS	Yegor Naumov
49	MF	RUS	Nikolai Revnyak
71	GK	RUS	Aleksei Kozlov
75	DF	RUS	Pavel Novitskiy (from Nika Moscow)
77	MF	SVN	Nejc Pečnik (on loan from (Portugal) Nacional)
83	DF	FRA	Steeve Joseph-Reinette (from (Bulgaria) Slavia Sofia)
89	MF	RUS	Maksim Paliyenko
92	GK	ALG	Raïs M'Bolhi (from (Bulgaria) Slavia Sofia)
93	MF	RUS	Artyom Bykov
94	DF	RUS	Denis Vikhrov
—	MF	BLR	Aliaksandr Hleb

Out: Note: Flags indicate national team as defined under FIFA eligibility rules; some limited exceptions apply. Players may hold more than one non-FIFA nationality.

No.	Pos.	Nation	Player
2	MF	RUS	Vladimir Khozin (to Torpedo Moscow)
3	DF	BRA	Leilton (to Volga Nizhny Novgorod)
8	MF	RUS	Daniil Gridnev (to Spartak Nalchik)
10	FW	SRB	Branimir Petrović (to Ural Sverdlovsk Oblast)
16	GK	UKR	Mykola Tsygan (to Sibir Novosibirsk)
17	FW	RUS	Aleksandr Stavpets (on loan to Ural Sverdlovsk Oblast)
19	FW	RUS	Vasili Pavlov (released)
21	MF	RUS	Ruslan Adzhindzhal (to Volga Nizhny Novgorod)
22	FW	BLR	Vitali Rushnitskiy (released)
29	MF	RUS	Sergei Budylin (to KAMAZ Naberezhnye Chelny)
31	GK	CHI	Eduardo Lobos (to (Chile) Unión Española)
33	DF	BIH	Goran Drmić (released)
34	DF	RUS	Vladimir Yaroslavtsev (to Biolog-Novokubansk Progress)
40	MF	RUS	Dmitri Kuznetsov (released)
42	DF	RUS	Andrei Redya (released)
50	DF	POL	Krzysztof Łągiewka (released)
63	DF	RUS	Aleksandr Belozyorov (to Volga Nizhny Novgorod)
66	MF	BIH	Danijel Majkić (to Baltika Kaliningrad)
69	MF	RUS	Anton Setezhev (released)
70	MF	RUS	Sergei Andrianov (released)
71	GK	RUS	Sergei Voronin (released)
73	FW	RUS	Artyom Pinyayev (released)
75	GK	RUS	Mikhail Oparin (released)
77	MF	RUS	Sergei Tkachyov (to (Ukraine) Metalist Kharkiv)
83	MF	MKD	Artim Položani (to Torpedo Moscow)
89	MF	RUS	Igor Yegoshkin (released)
99	MF	RUS	Oleg Ivanov (to Rostov)
—	DF	RUS	Vladimir Drukovskiy (to SKA-Energiya Khabarovsk)
—	DF	RUS	Aleksandr Khramov (released)
—	DF	BLR	Syarhey Palitsevich (to (Belarus) Dinamo Minsk)
—	DF	RUS	Roman Polovov (to Energiya Volzhsky)
—	MF	RUS	Yevgeni Pesegov (to Volgar-Gazprom Astrakhan)
—	MF	RUS	Artur Rylov (to Torpedo Moscow)
—	FW	RUS	Aleksandr Alkhazov (to Luch-Energiya Vladivostok)
—	FW	RUS	Igor Strelkov (released)

=== Lokomotiv Moscow ===
In: Note: Flags indicate national team as defined under FIFA eligibility rules; some limited exceptions apply. Players may hold more than one non-FIFA nationality.

No.	Pos.	Nation	Player
9	MF	BIH	Senijad Ibričić (from (Croatia) Hajduk Split)
16	GK	BLR	Anton Amelchenko (from Rostov)
17	FW	RUS	Aleksandr Marenich (from Alania Vladikavkaz)
24	DF	RUS	Andrei Ivanov (from Spartak Moscow)
39	MF	RUS	Kirill Pavlov (from Lokomotiv-2 Moscow)
48	DF	RUS	Sandro Tsveiba
51	DF	RUS	Ruslan Nakhushev (from Saturn Moscow Oblast)
54	MF	RUS	Viktor Lipin (from Saturn Moscow Oblast)
57	DF	RUS	Georgi Burnash
58	MF	RUS	Aleksandr Zakuskin
61	DF	RUS	Sergei Zuykov
63	MF	RUS	Panayot Khartiyadi
64	MF	RUS	Nikita Lapin (from Saturn Moscow Oblast)
70	MF	RUS	Yevgeni Kirisov
73	MF	RUS	Azret Omarov
75	DF	RUS	Aleksandr Seraskhov
80	FW	RUS	Semyon Sinyavskiy
86	DF	RUS	Anton Smirnov
87	DF	RUS	Vladimir Smirnov
89	DF	RUS	Nikita Samokhvalov
91	GK	RUS	Aleksandr Vorobyov
92	MF	RUS	Nikita Dubchak
94	MF	RUS	Aleksandr Zhizhin
97	GK	RUS	Yuri Kostrikov

Out: Note: Flags indicate national team as defined under FIFA eligibility rules; some limited exceptions apply. Players may hold more than one non-FIFA nationality.

No.	Pos.	Nation	Player
4	DF	BRA	Rodolfo (on loan to (Brazil) Grêmio)
6	DF	SRB	Milan Milanović (to (Italy) Palermo, to be registered in the summer)
13	MF	BRA	Wágner (to (Turkey) Gaziantepspor)
14	MF	RUS	Igor Smolnikov (to Zhemchuzhina-Sochi)
16	MF	BRA	Charles (on loan to (Brazil) Santos)
17	DF	RUS	Dmitri Sennikov (released)
19	FW	MLI	Dramane Traoré (to (Tunisia) Espérance)
22	GK	RUS	Aleksandr Krivoruchko (to Salyut Belgorod)
30	DF	GEO	Malkhaz Asatiani (released)
32	GK	CZE	Marek Čech (to Zhemchuzhina-Sochi)
41	MF	RUS	Ilya Mironov (to Krasnodar)
44	DF	RUS	Ruslan Kambolov (to Nizhny Novgorod)
51	DF	RUS	Maksim Belyayev (on loan to Dynamo Bryansk)
54	GK	RUS	Yegor Generalov (to Dynamo Moscow)
64	MF	RUS	Seyt-Daut Garakoyev (released)
65	FW	RUS	Dmitri Kukharchuk (to Rostov)
68	GK	RUS	Aleksandr Korshunov (released)
77	MF	RUS	Arkadi Kalaydzhyan (to Kuban Krasnodar)
79	DF	RUS	Aleksandr Yarkovoy (to Lokomotiv-2 Moscow)
88	MF	UKR	Oleksandr Aliyev (to (Ukraine) Dynamo Kyiv)
98	MF	RUS	Alan Chochiyev (on loan to Volgar-Gazprom Astrakhan)
—	DF	RUS	Sergei Yefimov (to Lokomotiv-2 Moscow)
—	MF	RUS	Kantemir Berkhamov (to Spartak Nalchik)
—	MF	RUS	Denis Voynov (released)
—	FW	RUS	Semyon Fomin (on loan to Torpedo Vladimir)
—	FW	RUS	Aleksandr Pankovets (to Nosta Novotroitsk)
—	FW	RUS	Artur Sarkisov (on loan to Shinnik Yaroslavl)

=== FC Rostov ===
In: Note: Flags indicate national team as defined under FIFA eligibility rules; some limited exceptions apply. Players may hold more than one non-FIFA nationality.

No.	Pos.	Nation	Player
1	GK	CZE	Martin Lejsal (from (Czech Republic) Zbrojovka Brno)
3	DF	SVK	Kornel Saláta (from (Slovakia) Slovan Bratislava)
5	DF	RUS	Aleksandr Khokhlov (from Zenit St. Petersburg)
10	FW	RUS	Dmitri Kirichenko (from Saturn Moscow Oblast)
13	MF	RUS	Aleksei Rebko (from Dynamo Moscow)
17	MF	RUS	Maksim Grigoryev (on loan from MITOS Novocherkassk)
20	DF	TUN	Anis Boussaidi (from (Greece) PAOK)
30	GK	RUS	Anton Kochenkov (on loan from Volga Nizhny Novgorod)
33	MF	RUS	Dmitri Malyaka (on loan from MITOS Novocherkassk)
34	MF	RUS	Aleksei Tkach
35	FW	RUS	Fyodor Dvornikov
36	DF	RUS	Dmitri Domrin
41	GK	RUS	Artyom Orsayev (from Taganrog)
42	MF	RUS	Artyom Kulishev
43	MF	RUS	Timur Mirzoyev
45	FW	RUS	Dmitri Kukharchuk (from Lokomotiv Moscow)
50	DF	RUS	Mikhail Martynov
51	GK	RUS	Rasul Farfutdinov
63	DF	RUS	Temür Mustafin
65	DF	RUS	Anton Kotenev
68	DF	RUS	Andrei Zotov
69	MF	RUS	Yevgeni Filippov (on loan from MITOS Novocherkassk)
88	MF	LTU	Edgaras Česnauskis (from Dynamo Moscow)
90	MF	RUS	Artyom Kulesha (on loan from Rubin Kazan)
99	MF	RUS	Oleg Ivanov (from Krylia Sovetov Samara)

Out: Note: Flags indicate national team as defined under FIFA eligibility rules; some limited exceptions apply. Players may hold more than one non-FIFA nationality.

No.	Pos.	Nation	Player
1	GK	BLR	Anton Amelchenko (to Lokomotiv Moscow)
3	DF	SRB	Dušan Anđelković (to Krasnodar)
5	DF	RUS	Aleksandr Cherkes (to Fakel Voronezh)
7	MF	BLR	Alyaksandr Kulchiy (to Krasnodar)
10	FW	RUS	Dmitri Akimov (to Sibir Novosibirsk)
11	MF	RUS	Igor Lebedenko (to Rubin Kazan)
16	GK	RUS	Vladimir Zabuga (to Taganrog)
17	DF	RUS	Sergei Shustikov (to Volga Ulyanovsk)
19	FW	BIH	Mersudin Ahmetović (to Volga Nizhny Novgorod)
20	MF	RUS	Artur Valikayev (to Spartak Moscow)
21	FW	PRK	Hong Yong-Jo (released)
24	DF	ROU	Sorin Ghionea (to (Romania) Politehnica Timișoara)
28	FW	RUS	Artyom Serdyuk (to MITOS Novocherkassk)
33	MF	RUS	Sergei Tumasyan (released)
37	DF	RUS	Oleg Leshchikov (to Astrakhan)
39	MF	RUS	Mirzaga Huseynpur (to MITOS Novocherkassk)
40	MF	RUS	Igor Ponomaryov (released)
42	FW	RUS	Anton Kabanov (released)
45	MF	RUS	Oleg Solonukha (released)
48	DF	RUS	Aleksandr Mitkin (released)
50	MF	RUS	Irakli Khokhba (released)
56	MF	RUS	David Tkebuchava (released)
—	GK	RUS	Maksim Kabanov (to Volgar-Gazprom Astrakhan)
—	DF	RUS	Astemir Sheriyev (released)
—	FW	RUS	Yevgeni Lutsenko (to SKA-Energiya Khabarovsk)

=== Rubin Kazan ===
In: Note: Flags indicate national team as defined under FIFA eligibility rules; some limited exceptions apply. Players may hold more than one non-FIFA nationality.

No.	Pos.	Nation	Player
9	MF	RUS	Pyotr Nemov (from Saturn Moscow Oblast)
11	MF	RUS	Igor Lebedenko (from Rostov)
12	FW	RUS	Merabi Uridia
14	FW	ECU	Walter Chalá (from (Ecuador) Deportivo Cuenca)
15	MF	BLR	Syarhey Kislyak (from (Belarus) Dinamo Minsk)
43	FW	RUS	Konstantin Vasilyev
67	DF	GEO	Solomon Kverkvelia (from Zenit St. Petersburg)
68	GK	RUS	Dmitri Volkotrub
95	MF	RUS	Dmitri Prokopenko

Out: Note: Flags indicate national team as defined under FIFA eligibility rules; some limited exceptions apply. Players may hold more than one non-FIFA nationality.

No.	Pos.	Nation	Player
6	DF	RSA	MacBeth Sibaya (to (South Africa) Moroka Swallows)
9	DF	GEO	Lasha Salukvadze (to Volga Nizhny Novgorod)
12	MF	ITA	Valerio Brandi (released)
15	MF	POL	Rafał Murawski (to (Poland) Lech Poznań)
23	MF	RUS	Yevgeni Balyaikin (on loan to Tom Tomsk)
25	DF	GEO	Dato Kvirkvelia (to (Greece) Panionios)
28	FW	NGA	Obafemi Martins (on loan to (England) Birmingham City)
31	DF	RUS	Mikhail Badyautdinov (released)
32	MF	RUS	Andrei Gorbanets (to Krasnodar)
41	MF	RUS	Ilsur Samigullin (to Neftekhimik Nizhnekamsk)
53	DF	RUS	Serdar Iolomanov (released)
57	FW	BLR	Anton Saroka (on loan to (Belarus) Partizan Minsk)
80	DF	RUS	Dmitri Tarabrikov (released)
81	FW	RUS	Ildar Bikchantayev (to Neftekhimik Nizhnekamsk)
83	MF	RUS	Vladimir Chernov (to Gornyak Uchaly)
86	DF	RUS	Vitali Ustinov (to Neftekhimik Nizhnekamsk)
90	MF	RUS	Artyom Kulesha (on loan to Rostov)
97	FW	RUS	Igor Portnyagin (on loan to Spartak Nalchik)
98	GK	MDA	Ilie Cebanu (on loan to Volgar-Gazprom Astrakhan)
—	GK	RUS	Yevgeni Cheremisin (to Neftekhimik Nizhnekamsk)
—	DF	RUS	Igor Klimov (released)
—	DF	RUS	Aleksandr Kulikov (on loan to Spartak Nalchik)
—	DF	RUS	Mikhail Mischenko (to Torpedo Moscow)
—	DF	RUS	Sergei Nesterenko (to SKA-Energiya Khabarovsk)
—	MF	RUS	Aleksei Kotlyarov (to Neftekhimik Nizhnekamsk)
—	FW	UZB	Davron Mirzaev (to Neftekhimik Nizhnekamsk)

=== Saturn Moscow Oblast ===
In: Note: Flags indicate national team as defined under FIFA eligibility rules; some limited exceptions apply. Players may hold more than one non-FIFA nationality.

No.	Pos.	Nation	Player

Out: Note: Flags indicate national team as defined under FIFA eligibility rules; some limited exceptions apply. Players may hold more than one non-FIFA nationality.

No.	Pos.	Nation	Player
1	GK	CZE	Antonín Kinský (released)
2	DF	UKR	Dmytro Parfenov (released)
4	MF	RUS	Roman Vorobyov (to Krasnodar)
5	MF	RUS	Aleksei Igonin (to Anzhi Makhachkala)
6	MF	RUS	Dmitri Grachyov (to Alania Vladikavkaz)
7	MF	RUS	Pyotr Nemov (to Rubin Kazan)
8	FW	BIH	Marko Topić (released)
11	MF	RUS	Denis Boyarintsev (to Zhemchuzhina-Sochi)
14	FW	RUS	Dmitri Kirichenko (to Rostov)
15	DF	RUS	Ruslan Nakhushev (to Lokomotiv Moscow)
16	DF	RUS	Vadim Evseev (to (Belarus) Torpedo-BelAZ Zhodino)
21	MF	RUS	Andrei Karyaka (to Dynamo Moscow)
22	MF	ARM	Zhora Hovhannisyan (released)
24	DF	CMR	Benoît Angbwa (to Anzhi Makhachkala)
26	DF	BRA	Zelão (to Kuban Krasnodar)
28	MF	RUS	Vladimir Kuzmichyov (to Dynamo Bryansk)
29	FW	BLR	Leonid Kovel (to (Belarus) Dinamo Minsk)
30	GK	RUS	Aleksandr Makarov (to Anzhi Makhachkala)
33	GK	RUS	Vitali Chilyushkin (to Sibir Novosibirsk)
41	MF	RUS	Aleksandr Sapeta (to Dynamo Moscow)
42	DF	RUS	Aleksandr Vlaskin (to Vityaz Podolsk)
44	MF	RUS	Nikita Lapin (to Lokomotiv Moscow)
46	MF	RUS	Viktor Kuzmichyov (to Anzhi Makhachkala)
49	MF	RUS	Artyom Anisimov (to Volga Nizhny Novgorod)
51	FW	RUS	Shamil Kurbanov (to Volga Nizhny Novgorod)
52	MF	RUS	Aleksandr Semyachkin (to Volga Nizhny Novgorod)
53	MF	RUS	Aleksandr Kolodko (released)
56	MF	RUS	Vladimir Sobolev (to Dynamo Moscow)
57	MF	RUS	Artyom Molodtsov (to Amkar Perm)
58	FW	RUS	Kirill Kuleshov (to Olimpia Gelendzhik)
60	FW	RUS	Sergey Pchyolkin (to Saturn-2 Moscow Oblast)
62	MF	RUS	Dmitri Nikitinsky (to Tom Tomsk)
64	DF	RUS	Sergei Bryzgalov (to Spartak Moscow)
67	MF	RUS	Emin Makhmudov (to Spartak Moscow)
69	DF	RUS	Dmitri Zinovich (to Olimpia Gelendzhik)
70	MF	RUS	Maksim Plopa (to Baltika Kaliningrad)
71	MF	RUS	Artyom Bragin (to Volga Nizhny Novgorod)
72	MF	RUS	Vladimir Torshentsev (to Dynamo Moscow)
73	FW	RUS	Anton Trubitsin (released)
74	FW	RUS	Temuri Bukiya (to Spartak Moscow)
75	MF	RUS	Viktor Lipin (to Lokomotiv Moscow)
76	FW	RUS	Konstantin Savichev (to Spartak Moscow)
77	GK	RUS	Artyom Rebrov (to Shinnik Yaroslavl)
79	FW	RUS	Marat Gubzhev (to Krylia Sovetov Samara)
88	MF	RUS	Aleksei Ivanov (to Anzhi Makhachkala)
90	GK	RUS	Aleksandr Romanov (to Vityaz Podolsk)
95	MF	RUS	Makhach Gadzhiyev (to Anzhi Makhachkala)
99	FW	NGA	Solomon Okoronkwo (to (Norway) Ålesund)
—	GK	RUS	Aleksei Botvinyev (to Tom Tomsk)
—	GK	RUS	Mikhail Filippov (released)
—	DF	RUS	Yevgeni Malkov (released)
—	DF	RUS	Aleksandr Manyukov (to Zenit St. Petersburg)
—	DF	TJK	Farkhod Vasiev (to Zhemchuzhina-Sochi)
—	MF	RUS	Anton Kozlov (to Tom Tomsk)
—	MF	RUS	Daniil Mots (released)
—	MF	RUS	Ivan Temnikov (to Dynamo Bryansk)
—	FW	BLR	Vladimir Yurchenko (to (Belarus) Shakhtyor Soligorsk)

=== Sibir Novosibirsk ===
In: Note: Flags indicate national team as defined under FIFA eligibility rules; some limited exceptions apply. Players may hold more than one non-FIFA nationality.

No.	Pos.	Nation	Player
1	GK	UKR	Mykola Tsygan (from Krylia Sovetov Samara)
5	DF	MDA	Victor Golovatenco (from Kuban Krasnodar)
10	FW	RUS	Dmitri Akimov (from Rostov)
12	FW	RUS	Vasili Karmazinenko (from SKA-Energiya Khabarovsk)
13	FW	RUS	Dmitri Sysuyev (from Mordovia Saransk)
21	DF	RUS	Sergei Ignatyev (from Chelyabinsk)
30	GK	CZE	Petr Vašek (from (Czech Republic) Slovácko)
32	MF	RUS	Denis Skorokhodov (from Dynamo Barnaul)
33	MF	RUS	Rustem Khaliullin (from KAMAZ Naberezhye Chelny)
41	DF	RUS	Aleksandr Gorin (from Salyut Belgorod)
44	DF	RUS	Nikita Chicherin (on loan from Dynamo Moscow)
77	GK	RUS	Vitali Chilyushkin (from Saturn Moscow Oblast)

Out: Note: Flags indicate national team as defined under FIFA eligibility rules; some limited exceptions apply. Players may hold more than one non-FIFA nationality.

No.	Pos.	Nation	Player
1	GK	RUS	Aleksei Solosin (to Dynamo Barnaul)
3	DF	BLR	Dmitry Molosh (to Krylia Sovetov Samara)
5	DF	RUS	Mikhail Luchinkin (to Sibir-2 Novosibirsk)
7	MF	LTU	Mantas Savėnas (to Gazovik Orenburg)
9	FW	RUS	Aleksandr Antipenko (to Volgar-Gazprom Astrakhan)
12	FW	POL	Bartłomiej Grzelak (to (Poland) Jagiellonia Białystok)
16	GK	RUS	Maksim Yeliseyev (to Sibir-2 Novosibirsk)
18	MF	RUS	Dmitri Melnikov (to Sibir-2 Novosibirsk)
19	MF	RUS	Danil Kochkin (to Amkar Perm)
24	DF	LTU	Arūnas Klimavičius (released)
27	MF	RUS	Aleksei Aravin (to Volga Nizhny Novgorod)
29	MF	RUS	Andrei Shreiner (to Sibir-2 Novosibirsk)
30	GK	POL	Wojciech Kowalewski (to (Cyprus) Anorthosis Famagusta)
31	FW	RUS	Maksim Gorodtsov (to Sibir-2 Novosibirsk)
33	MF	RUS	Pavel Logvinov (to Sibir-2 Novosibirsk)
36	GK	RUS	Kirill Komarenko (released)
38	MF	RUS	Eduard Krug (to Sibir-2 Novosibirsk)
44	DF	RUS	Vyacheslav Shishkin (to Sibir-2 Novosibirsk)
54	MF	RUS	Aleksei Vasilyev (on loan to Torpedo Moscow)
55	MF	RUS	Aleksei Gladyshev (to Sibir-2 Novosibirsk)
62	MF	RUS	Gia Kulumbegashvili (released)
64	FW	RUS	Vladimir Glukhov (to Sibir-2 Novosibirsk)
65	FW	RUS	Artyom Dudolev (to Sibir-2 Novosibirsk)
68	DF	RUS	Vitali Zaprudskikh (to Sibir-2 Novosibirsk)
70	DF	CZE	Martin Horák (released)
77	GK	RUS	Ilya Trunin (to Sibir-2 Novosibirsk)
80	MF	RUS	Sergei Korotkov (to Sibir-2 Novosibirsk)
85	MF	RUS	Roman Mokin (to Vityaz Podolsk)
90	MF	RUS	Maksim Zhitnev (to Sibir-2 Novosibirsk)
91	MF	RUS	Aleksandr Shumov (to Sibir-2 Novosibirsk)
92	MF	RUS	Aleksandr Maslovskiy (released)
93	DF	RUS	Sergei Burkovetskiy (to Sibir-2 Novosibirsk)
94	DF	RUS	Kirill Orlov (to Salyut Belgorod)
96	DF	RUS	Ivan Stain (to Sibir-2 Novosibirsk)
97	MF	RUS	Nikolay Lipatkin (to Petrotrest Saint Petersburg)
99	FW	RUS	Igor Shevchenko (on loan to Zhemchuzhina-Sochi)
—	GK	RUS	Timur Bagautdinov (to Metallurg-Kuzbass Novokuznetsk)
—	DF	RUS	Denis Gudayev (to Sibir-2 Novosibirsk)
—	DF	RUS	Igor Shestakov (to Khimki)

=== Spartak Moscow ===
In: Note: Flags indicate national team as defined under FIFA eligibility rules; some limited exceptions apply. Players may hold more than one non-FIFA nationality.

No.	Pos.	Nation	Player
3	DF	ESP	Rodrí (from (Spain) Hércules)
4	MF	RUS	Emin Makhmudov (from Saturn Moscow Oblast)
19	DF	ARG	Marcos Rojo (from (Argentina) Estudiantes)
20	MF	RUS	Artur Valikayev (from Rostov)
37	DF	RUS	Sergei Bryzgalov (from Saturn Moscow Oblast)
40	FW	RUS	Ilnur Alshin (from Nara-ShBFR Naro-Fominsk)
43	FW	RUS	Artyom Fedchuk
45	DF	RUS	Viktor Shchuchkin
47	GK	RUS	Aleksei Skornyakov (from Znamya Truda Orekhovo-Zuyevo)
52	MF	RUS	Igor Leontyev
53	MF	RUS	Artyom Samsonov
60	FW	RUS	Konstantin Savichev (from Saturn Moscow Oblast)
62	FW	RUS	Temuri Bukiya (from Saturn Moscow Oblast)
63	MF	RUS	Alim Dzhukkayev
90	MF	RUS	Andrey Tikhonov (from Khimki)

Out: Note: Flags indicate national team as defined under FIFA eligibility rules; some limited exceptions apply. Players may hold more than one non-FIFA nationality.

No.	Pos.	Nation	Player
2	MF	ARG	Cristian Maidana (on loan to (Argentina) Huracán)
3	DF	AUT	Martin Stranzl (to (Germany) Borussia Mönchengladbach)
6	MF	RUS	Renat Sabitov (to Tom Tomsk)
8	MF	MNE	Nikola Drinčić (to Krasnodar)
10	MF	RUS	Ivan Saenko (released)
18	DF	RUS	Andrei Ivanov (to Lokomotiv Moscow)
20	MF	RUS	Aleksandr Zotov (on loan to Zhemchuzhina-Sochi)
21	FW	RUS	Nikita Bazhenov (to Tom Tomsk)
29	MF	RUS	Pavel Golyshev (to Tom Tomsk)
30	GK	RUS	Sergei Pesyakov (on loan to Tom Tomsk)
33	MF	RUS	Dmitri Malyaka (to MITOS Novocherkassk)
34	DF	RUS	Artyom Filatov (released)
36	GK	RUS	Azamat Dzhioyev (to Anzhi Makhachkala)
39	MF	RUS	Maksim Grigoryev (to MITOS Novocherkassk)
44	MF	RUS	Maksim Terentyev (released)
46	MF	RUS	Konstantin Sovetkin (on loan to Volga Ulyanovsk)
47	DF	RUS	Anton Ukolov (released)
51	MF	RUS	Pavel Solomatin (to Karelia Petrozavodsk)
55	FW	BLR	Dmitri Khlebosolov (on loan to (Belarus) Naftan Novopolotsk)
59	MF	RUS	Aleksandr Ilyin (released)
89	FW	RUS	Aleksandr Prudnikov (on loan to Anzhi Makhachkala)
—	DF	BLR	Egor Filipenko (on loan to (Belarus) BATE Borisov)
—	MF	RUS	Igor Gorbatenko (on loan to Dynamo Bryansk)
—	MF	UKR	Yegor Lugachyov (to (Ukraine) Arsenal Kyiv)
—	MF	RUS	Artur Maloyan (on loan to Dynamo Bryansk)
—	MF	RUS	Aleksandr Pavlenko (to Terek Grozny)

=== Spartak Nalchik ===
In: Note: Flags indicate national team as defined under FIFA eligibility rules; some limited exceptions apply. Players may hold more than one non-FIFA nationality.

No.	Pos.	Nation	Player
2	DF	RUS	Yuri Lebedev (from Baltika Kaliningrad)
3	DF	RUS	Yevgeni Ovsiyenko (from Irtysh Omsk)
5	MF	BIH	Adnan Zahirović (from (Bosnia and Herzegovina) Čelik Zenica)
6	DF	RUS	Andrei Lukanchenkov (from Avangard Kursk)
7	MF	RUS	Kantemir Berkhamov (from Lokomotiv Moscow)
14	MF	RUS	Daniil Gridnev (from Krylia Sovetov Samara)
15	FW	RUS	Igor Portnyagin (on loan from Rubin Kazan)
17	MF	RUS	Mikhail Bagayev (from Krasnodar)
19	DF	RUS	Aleksandr Kulikov (on loan from Rubin Kazan)
21	FW	MNE	Bogdan Milić (from (Czech Republic) Viktoria Plzeň)
23	GK	RUS	Anton Antipov (from Druzhba Maykop)
33	GK	RUS	Yevgeny Pomazan (on loan from CSKA Moscow)
43	MF	RUS	Alikhan Shavayev
44	DF	RUS	Idar Kubalov
46	DF	RUS	Islam Yaganov
48	DF	RUS	Zalim Makoyev
50	GK	RUS	Timur Khaniyev
52	DF	RUS	Zhantemir Soblirov
87	FW	RUS	Nazir Kazharov (from Volgar-Gazprom Astrakhan)
91	DF	RUS	Azamat Serkov
99	MF	UKR	Serhiy Pylypchuk (from Shinnik Yaroslavl)

Out: Note: Flags indicate national team as defined under FIFA eligibility rules; some limited exceptions apply. Players may hold more than one non-FIFA nationality.

No.	Pos.	Nation	Player
3	DF	RUS	Viktor Vasin (to CSKA Moscow)
4	DF	RUS	Marat Alchagirov (released)
7	MF	GEO	Gogita Gogua (to Volga Nizhny Novgorod)
17	MF	RUS	Valentin Filatov (released)
19	DF	RUS	Roman Amirkhanov (to Olimpia Gelendzhik)
21	MF	RUS	Oleg Shalayev (to Krylia Sovetov Samara)
23	DF	SRB	Stefan Deák (to (Spain) Deportivo La Coruña)
33	MF	KAZ	Kazbek Geteriev (to Zhemchuzina-Sochi)
34	MF	RUS	Alim Mikheyev (to Dynamo Stavropol)
35	FW	RUS	Mikhail Bilaonov (to Alania-d Vladikavkaz)
37	DF	RUS	Azamat Merov (to Angusht Nazran)
39	DF	RUS	Zaurbek Pliyev (released)
40	GK	RUS	Artur Kumykov (to Angusht Nazran)
46	DF	RUS	Zalim Kishev (to Angusht Nazran)
47	MF	RUS	Rustam Shortanov (released)
48	MF	RUS	Aleksandr Trubitsin (to Khimik Dzerzhinsk)
52	DF	RUS	Astemir Soblirov (released)
73	GK	LVA	Aleksandrs Koliņko (to Baltika Kaliningrad)
99	MF	RUS	Aslan Dyshekov (to Dynamo Stavropol)
—	FW	BLR	Artem Kontsevoy (to (Belarus) BATE)

=== Terek Grozny ===
In: Note: Flags indicate national team as defined under FIFA eligibility rules; some limited exceptions apply. Players may hold more than one non-FIFA nationality.

No.	Pos.	Nation	Player
15	MF	RUS	Aleksandr Pavlenko (from Spartak Moscow)
17	FW	ZIM	Musawengosi Mguni (from (Ukraine) Metalurh Donetsk)
25	DF	POL	Piotr Polczak (from (Poland) Cracovia)
39	MF	RUS	Umar Davletmurzayev
42	FW	RUS	Aslan Tokhosashvili
43	FW	RUS	Islam Davletukayev
44	DF	RUS	Dzhabrail Kadiyev
47	MF	RUS	Adam Baybatyrov
71	MF	RUS	Sayd-Magomed Suleymanov
91	GK	RUS	Magomed Dokuyev

Out: Note: Flags indicate national team as defined under FIFA eligibility rules; some limited exceptions apply. Players may hold more than one non-FIFA nationality.

No.	Pos.	Nation	Player
10	MF	RUS	Shamil Lakhiyalov (to Krasnodar)
18	DF	RUS	Timur Dzhabrailov (retired)
23	FW	RUS	Islam Tsuroyev (released)
24	MF	RUS	Dmitri Smirnov (to Mordovia Saransk)
34	MF	RUS	Islam Dadayev (released)
37	DF	RUS	Sharudi Bukhiyev (released)
39	MF	RUS	Ali Idrisov (released)
44	MF	RUS	Aslan Dashayev (to Angusht Nazran)
45	MF	RUS	Ramzan Utsiyev (released)
55	MF	RUS	Ramzan Sadulayev (released)
71	MF	BOL	Juan Carlos Arce (to (Bolivia) Oriente Petrolero)
91	GK	RUS	Magomed Serazhdinov (released)
92	DF	RUS	Raybek Surkhayev (released)

=== Tom Tomsk ===
In: Note: Flags indicate national team as defined under FIFA eligibility rules; some limited exceptions apply. Players may hold more than one non-FIFA nationality.

No.	Pos.	Nation	Player
1	GK	RUS	Aleksei Botvinyev (from Saturn Moscow Oblast)
4	DF	BLR	Sergey Sosnovski (from (Belarus) BATE Borisov)
14	MF	RUS	Anton Kozlov (from Saturn Moscow Oblast)
17	MF	RUS	Pavel Golyshev (from Spartak Moscow)
20	DF	BLR	Yan Tsiharow (from (Ukraine) Metalurh Zaporizhya)
23	MF	RUS	Yevgeni Balyaikin (on loan from Rubin Kazan)
30	GK	RUS	Sergei Pesyakov (on loan from Spartak Moscow)
32	FW	RUS	Nikita Bazhenov (from Spartak Moscow)
34	MF	RUS	Renat Sabitov (from Spartak Moscow)
45	MF	RUS	Yevgeni Goryachev
48	DF	RUS	Aleksandr Moskov
49	FW	RUS	Aleksandr Bogdanov
62	MF	RUS	Dmitri Nikitinsky (from Saturn Moscow Oblast)
68	DF	RUS	Nikolai Pogrebnyak
71	GK	RUS	Gleb Sochavo
75	MF	RUS	Sultan Aksanov
78	FW	RUS	Kirill Pogrebnyak
79	DF	RUS	Yaroslav Ovsyannikov
97	DF	RUS	Dmitri Tikhonov (from Dynamo Moscow)
99	FW	RUS	Maksim Kanunnikov (on loan from Zenit St. Petersburg)

Out: Note: Flags indicate national team as defined under FIFA eligibility rules; some limited exceptions apply. Players may hold more than one non-FIFA nationality.

No.	Pos.	Nation	Player
2	DF	RUS	Ivan Tuyev (on loan to Khimik Dzerzhinsk)
6	MF	RUS	Dmitri Michkov (to Krasnodar)
9	MF	MDA	Serghei Covalciuc (to Zhemchuzhina-Sochi)
10	FW	MKD	Goran Maznov (to (Greece) Kerkyra)
12	GK	UZB	Aleksei Poliakov (to Lokomotiv-2 Moscow)
22	DF	KOR	Park Hyo-Sang (released)
23	DF	RUS	Georgi Dzhioyev (to Zhemchuzhina-Sochi)
25	GK	EST	Sergei Pareiko (to (Poland) Wisła Kraków)
28	DF	RUS	Konstantin Dmitriyevskiy (to Irtysh Omsk)
29	DF	RUS	Nikita Konovalov (released)
41	GK	RUS	Fyodor Burdykin (to Torpedo Vladimir)
43	FW	RUS	Roman Zharikov (on loan to Khimik Dzerzhinsk)
62	DF	RUS	Artur Zaks (to Volochanin-Ratmir Vyshny Volochyok)
70	MF	RUS	Valentin Gaponov (to Yakutiya Yakutsk)
70	FW	RUS	Artyom Korotya (released)
73	DF	RUS	Ilya Gerdt (released)
81	MF	HUN	Norbert Németh (to (Hungary) Vasas)
90	MF	RUS	Denis Pshenichnikov (released)
—	GK	RUS	Yevgeni Gorodov (to Krasnodar)
—	GK	RUS	Yegor Ridosh (to Khimik Dzerzhinsk)
—	DF	RUS	Sergei Golyatkin (to SKA-Energiya Khabarovsk)
—	DF	RUS	Dmitri Sergeyev (to Irtysh Omsk)
—	MF	RUS	Alexey Yakimov (released)
—	FW	RUS	Anton Arkhipov (to Shinnik Yaroslavl)
—	FW	RUS	Yevgeni Ponomaryov (released)
—	FW	RUS	Sergei Voronov (to KUZBASS Kemerovo)

=== Zenit Saint Petersburg ===
In: Note: Flags indicate national team as defined under FIFA eligibility rules; some limited exceptions apply. Players may hold more than one non-FIFA nationality.

No.	Pos.	Nation	Player
21	MF	CHI	Nicolás Peñailillo (on loan from (Chile) Everton)
56	DF	RUS	Kirill Kostin
68	MF	RUS	Vyacheslav Zinkov
69	DF	RUS	Aleksandr Manyukov (from Saturn Moscow Oblast)
81	GK	RUS	Pavel Dronov
84	FW	RUS	Sergei Tsyganov
85	MF	RUS	Pavel Mogilevets
89	FW	RUS	Yevgeni Markov
96	DF	RUS	Ilya Zuyev

Out: Note: Flags indicate national team as defined under FIFA eligibility rules; some limited exceptions apply. Players may hold more than one non-FIFA nationality.

No.	Pos.	Nation	Player
4	DF	CRO	Ivica Križanac (to (Croatia) Split)
17	MF	ITA	Alessandro Rosina (on loan to (Italy) Cesena)
47	DF	RUS	Basel Abdoulfattakh (to Krylia Sovetov Samara)
64	DF	RUS	Ilya Lebedev (released)
66	DF	RUS	Yuri Ponomarenko (released)
69	MF	RUS	Yevgeni Bashkirov (released)
74	DF	RUS	Vladimir Malyshev (released)
75	MF	RUS	Ilya Sagdatullin (released)
78	FW	RUS	Vladislav Yefimov (released)
81	GK	RUS	Aleksandr Glinskikh (released)
89	DF	GEO	Solomon Kverkvelia (to Rubin Kazan)
90	GK	RUS	Aleksei Dugnist (released)
96	MF	RUS	Roland Gigolayev (to Alania Vladikavkaz)
99	FW	RUS	Maksim Kanunnikov (on loan to Tom Tomsk)
—	GK	RUS	Mikhail Kerzhakov (to Volga Nizhny Novgorod)
—	DF	RUS	Aleksandr Khokhlov (to Rostov)
—	DF	DEN	Michael Lumb (on loan to (Denmark) AaB)
—	DF	RUS	Pavel Mochalin (released)
—	DF	FIN	Boris Rotenberg (to Dynamo Moscow)
—	MF	RUS	Anton Sosnin (to Krylia Sovetov Samara)
—	FW	RUS	Pavel Ignatovich (to Dynamo Bryansk)
—	FW	BLR	Sergei Kornilenko (on loan to (England) Blackpool)
—	FW	RUS	German Pyatnikov (released)

== Russian Premier League 2011–12 ==
=== FC Krasnodar ===
In: Note: Flags indicate national team as defined under FIFA eligibility rules; some limited exceptions apply. Players may hold more than one non-FIFA nationality.

No.	Pos.	Nation	Player
1	GK	RUS	Yevgeni Gorodov (from Tom Tomsk)
3	DF	SRB	Dušan Anđelković (from Rostov)
5	DF	GEO	Aleksandr Amisulashvili (from (Turkey) Kayserispor)
6	MF	RUS	Dmitri Michkov (from Tom Tomsk)
8	MF	RUS	Andrei Gorbanets (from Rubin Kazan)
10	FW	ARM	Yura Movsisyan (from (Denmark) Randers)
15	DF	BIH	Ognjen Vranješ (from (Serbia) Red Star Belgrade)
17	DF	RUS	Artyom Yankovskiy (from Krasnodar-2000)
18	GK	RUS	Igor Usminskiy (from Amkar Perm)
19	MF	RUS	Alexandr Erokhin (from (Moldova) Sheriff Tiraspol)
20	MF	RUS	Yakov Zaika (from Krasnodar-2000)
22	MF	BRA	Joãozinho (from (Bulgaria) Levski Sofia)
24	MF	BLR	Alyaksandr Kulchiy (from Rostov)
26	MF	POR	Márcio Abreu (from (Bulgaria) Chernomorets Burgas)
27	MF	RUS	Ilya Mironov (from Lokomotiv Moscow)
28	MF	RUS	Roman Vorobyov (from Saturn Moscow Oblast)
30	DF	RUS	Konstantin Ryabov (from Akademiya Tolyatti)
31	MF	RUS	Artur Adamyan (from Dnepr Smolensk)
32	MF	RUS	Aleksei Maslennikov (from Krasnodar-2000)
34	MF	RUS	Nikita Galkin
35	FW	RUS	Aleksei Bezglasny (from Krasnodar-2000)
36	FW	RUS	Aleksei Zolotarenko
44	DF	RUS	Sergei Khimov (from Saturn Moscow Oblast academy)
47	DF	RUS	Frants Guk (from Saturn-2 Moscow Oblast)
50	MF	RUS	Aleksei Ryabokon (from Krasnodar-2000)
55	DF	SRB	Nemanja Tubić (from (Ukraine) Karpaty Lviv)
58	GK	RUS	Arsen Beglaryan
77	MF	RUS	Andriano Kokoskeriya (from Krasnodar-2000)
84	MF	MNE	Nikola Drinčić (from Spartak Moscow)
94	DF	RUS	Maksim Pichugin (from CSKA Moscow academy)

Out: Note: Flags indicate national team as defined under FIFA eligibility rules; some limited exceptions apply. Players may hold more than one non-FIFA nationality.

No.	Pos.	Nation	Player
3	MF	RUS	Vladimir Leshonok (to Yenisey Krasnoyarsk)
5	DF	RUS	Yevgeni Kaleshin (to Chernomorets Novorossiysk)
6	DF	RUS	Sergei Tsukanov (to Torpedo Vladimir)
8	FW	RUS	Aleksandr Oleinik (to Gazovik Orenburg)
10	FW	RUS	Aleksandr Yarkin (on loan to SKA-Energiya Khabarovsk)
15	DF	RUS	Yegor Tarakanov (to Chernomorets Novorossiysk)
17	MF	RUS	Mikhail Bagayev (to Spartak Nalchik)
18	MF	RUS	Azim Fatullayev (on loan to Yenisey Krasnoyarsk)
22	MF	RUS	Roman Surnev (to Yenisey Krasnoyarsk)
24	DF	RUS	Sergei Miroshnichenko (to Khimki)
26	FW	MNE	Ivan Knežević (on loan to (Montenegro) Zeta)
27	DF	UKR	Denys Dedechko (released)
28	DF	MNE	Ivan Novović (on loan to (Montenegro) Zeta)
30	GK	RUS	Aleksandr Perov (released)
—	GK	RUS	Nikolay Moskalenko (released)
—	MF	RUS	Aleksei Arkhipov (to Vityaz Podolsk)
—	MF	RUS	Shamil Lakhiyalov (to Anzhi Makhachkala)
—	FW	RUS	Denis Dorozhkin (on loan to Chernomorets Novorossiysk)
—	FW	RUS	Nikita Zhdankin (to Gazovik Orenburg)

=== Kuban Krasnodar ===
In: Note: Flags indicate national team as defined under FIFA eligibility rules; some limited exceptions apply. Players may hold more than one non-FIFA nationality.

No.	Pos.	Nation	Player
4	DF	URU	Mauricio Prieto (from (Uruguay) River Plate)
6	MF	RUS	David Tsorayev (from Anzhi Makhachkala)
17	MF	RUS	Artyom Fidler (from Ural Sverdlovsk Oblast)
20	FW	CIV	Lacina Traoré (from (Romania) CFR Cluj)
21	FW	CRC	Marco Ureña (from (Costa Rica) Alajuelense)
22	MF	RUS	Igor Paderin (from Torpedo Vladimir)
26	DF	BRA	Zelão (from Saturn Moscow Oblast)
40	MF	ROU	Dacian Varga (on loan from (Romania) Sportul Studenţesc)
44	DF	RUS	Ivan Knyazev
45	MF	RUS	Aleksandr Karibov
50	DF	RUS	Rustam Kokoskeriya
55	MF	RUS	Arkadi Kalaydzhyan (from Lokomotiv Moscow)
57	GK	RUS	Eduard Baychora
69	MF	RUS	Ivan Gagloyev
71	MF	RUS	Bunyamudin Mustafayev
72	DF	RUS	Maksim Kovalchuk
73	MF	RUS	Yevgeni Kurdus
75	DF	RUS	Sergei Drampov
77	MF	RUS	Tavakkyul Mamedov
79	DF	RUS	Radomir Ponomaryov
81	GK	RUS	Aleksandr Rudenko
87	MF	RUS	Ilya Maksimov (from Nizhny Novgorod)
88	MF	RUS	Aleksandr Nesterenko
90	FW	RUS	Anton Sekret (from Krasnodar-2000)
91	FW	RUS	Yevgeni Kasyanov
92	MF	RUS	Ruslan Slinko
93	MF	RUS	Kakha Khalvashi
94	DF	RUS	Aleksandr Kaglyuk
96	MF	RUS	Maksim Malysh
97	MF	RUS	Vladimir Lobkaryov

Out: Note: Flags indicate national team as defined under FIFA eligibility rules; some limited exceptions apply. Players may hold more than one non-FIFA nationality.

No.	Pos.	Nation	Player
3	DF	MDA	Victor Golovatenco (to Sibir Novosibirsk)
6	MF	UKR	Dmitriy Gorbushin (to Chernomorets Novorossiysk)
14	MF	RUS	Renat Baratov (to Torpedo Armavir)
17	FW	MNE	Nikola Nikezić (released)
20	MF	RUS	Anton Kiselyov (to SKA-Energiya Khabarovsk)
21	DF	RUS	Anton Lunin (released)
23	DF	RUS	Oleg Malyukov (to Salyut Belgorod)
27	MF	RUS	Maksim Shevchenko (to Volgar-Gazprom Astrakhan)
70	GK	RUS	Aleksei Chuyev (released)
91	DF	RUS	Vitali Shakhov (to Torpedo Armavir)
99	FW	RUS	Rustem Kalimullin (to Dynamo Bryansk)
—	DF	RUS	Viktor Dmitrenko (to Torpedo Armavir)
—	DF	SRB	Sreten Sretenović (to (Slovenia) Olimpija Ljubljana)
—	MF	RUS	Azat Bairyyev (on loan to Dynamo Bryansk)

=== Volga Nizhny Novgorod ===
In: Note: Flags indicate national team as defined under FIFA eligibility rules; some limited exceptions apply. Players may hold more than one non-FIFA nationality.

No.	Pos.	Nation	Player
3	DF	BRA	Leilton (from Krylia Sovetov Samara)
4	DF	GEO	Lasha Salukvadze (from Rubin Kazan)
8	DF	RUS	Gia Grigalava (from SKA Rostov-on-Don)
11	FW	GEO	Mate Vatsadze (from (Georgia (country)) Dinamo Tbilisi)
13	DF	HUN	Miklós Gaál (from Amkar Perm)
14	MF	GEO	Gogita Gogua (from Spartak Nalchik)
15	DF	RUS	Maksim Zyuzin (from Nizhny Novgorod)
17	MF	RUS	Maksim Burchenko (from Luch-Energiya Vladivostok)
19	FW	BIH	Mersudin Ahmetović (from Rostov)
20	MF	ESP	Marc Crosas (from (Scotland) Celtic)
21	MF	RUS	Ruslan Adzhindzhal (from Krylia Sovetov Samara)
22	MF	RUS	Artyom Anisimov (from Saturn Moscow Oblast)
24	MF	RUS	Ruslan Pashtov (from Dynamo Moscow)
26	DF	RUS	Sergei Bendz (from Nizhny Novgorod)
27	MF	RUS	Aleksei Aravin (from Sibir Novosibirsk)
28	MF	RUS	Aleksandr Semyachkin (from Saturn Moscow Oblast)
29	MF	RUS	Shota Bibilov (from Alania Vladikavkaz)
31	GK	RUS	Ilya Abayev (from Anzhi Makhachkala)
35	MF	RUS	Roman Boldyrev (from Nika Moscow)
40	MF	RUS	Vladislav Gudoshnikov (free agent)
41	GK	RUS	Mikhail Kerzhakov (from Zenit St. Petersburg)
51	MF	RUS	Roman Dzhigkayev
52	FW	RUS	Mikhail Sorochkin
53	DF	RUS	Pavel Averin (from Tekstilshchik Ivanovo)
63	DF	RUS	Aleksandr Belozyorov (from Krylia Sovetov Samara)
77	FW	GEO	Otar Martsvaladze (from Anzhi Makhachkala)
79	FW	RUS	Shamil Kurbanov (from Saturn Moscow Oblast)
80	MF	RUS	Artyom Bragin (from Saturn Moscow Oblast)
99	MF	GEO	Gocha Khojava (from Anzhi Makhachkala)

Out: Note: Flags indicate national team as defined under FIFA eligibility rules; some limited exceptions apply. Players may hold more than one non-FIFA nationality.

No.	Pos.	Nation	Player
2	DF	RUS	Aslan Zaseev (to Chernomorets Novorossiysk)
5	DF	GEO	Edik Sadzhaya (to Khimki)
6	MF	RUS	Dmitri Polyanin (on loan to Nizhny Novgorod)
8	MF	RUS	Sergei Rashevsky (to Ural Sverdlovsk Oblast)
10	FW	BIH	Petar Jelić (on loan to (Georgia (country)) Dinamo Tbilisi)
11	MF	RUS	Vitali Volkov (released)
13	MF	RUS	Maksim Semakin (to Ural Sverdlovsk Oblast)
14	FW	RUS	Aleksandr Salugin (to Nizhny Novgorod)
17	MF	RUS	Sergei Vinogradov (to Sakhalin Yuzhno-Sakhalinsk)
19	FW	RUS	Oleg Kozhanov (to KAMAZ Naberezhnye Chelny)
20	MF	BLR	Ihar Stasevich (to (Belarus) Gomel)
30	GK	RUS	Anton Kochenkov (on loan to Rostov)
36	GK	RUS	Mikhail Levashov (released)
88	DF	GEO	Giorgi Navalovski (to Khimki)
—	GK	RUS	Oleg Smirnov (to Kaluga)
—	DF	RUS	Dmitry Aydov (to Nizhny Novgorod)
—	DF	CIV	Alli N'Dri (to Shinnik Yaroslavl)
—	MF	RUS	Marat Khairullin (released)
—	MF	RUS	Yevgeni Malakhov (released)
—	MF	RUS	Rinat Mavletdinov (on loan to Khimki)
—	MF	RUS	Sergei Osadchuk (to Ufa)
—	MF	UKR	Serhiy Pylypchuk (released)
—	MF	RUS	Oleg Trifonov (released)
—	MF	RUS	Nikolay Vdovichenko (on loan to Tekstilshchik Ivanovo)
—	FW	RUS	Mikhail Mysin (to SKA-Energiya Khabarovsk)
