= Yeltsovka =

Yeltsovka (Russian: Ельцовка) may refer to several places in Russia:

- Yeltsovka Airport, near Novosibirsk
- Yeltsovka (Ob), a minor tributary of the Ob near Novosibirsk
- rural localities in Altai Krai:
  - Yeltsovka, Shipunovsky District, Altai Krai, a selo in Yeltsovsky Selsoviet of Shipunovsky District
  - Yeltsovka, Troitsky District, Altai Krai, a selo in Khayryuzovsky Selsoviet of Troitsky District
  - Yeltsovka, Ust-Kalmansky District, Altai Krai, a selo in Kabanovsky Selsoviet of Ust-Kalmansky District
  - Yeltsovka, Yeltsovsky District, Altai Krai, a selo in Yeltsovsky Selsoviet of Yeltsovsky District
