= Ogni, Altai Krai =

Ogni Огни
- Selo
- Location within Altai Krai Location within Russia
- Coordinates: 51°54′N 83°32′E
- Country: Russia
- Region: Altai Krai
- District: Ust-Kalmansky District
- Time zone: UTC+7:00

Ogni (Russian: Огни) is a rural locality (a selo) and the administrative center of Ognyovsky Selsoviet, Ust-Kalmansky District, Altai Krai, Russia. The population was 1,184 as of 2013. There are 12 streets.

== Geography ==
Ogni is located 36 km southeast of Ust-Kalmanka (the district's administrative centre) by road. Slyudyanka is the nearest rural locality.
