= Novokalmanka =

Novokalmanka Новокалманка
- Selo
- Location within Altai Krai Location within Russia
- Coordinates: 51°57′N 83°21′E
- Country: Russia
- Region: Altai Krai
- District: Ust-Kalmansky District
- Time zone: UTC+7:00

Novokalmanka (Russian: Новокалманка) is a rural locality (a selo) and the administrative center of Novokalmansky Selsoviet, Ust-Kalmansky District, Altai Krai, Russia. The population was 573 as of 2013. There are 11 streets.

== Geography ==
Novokalmanka is located 22 km south of Ust-Kalmanka (the district's administrative centre) by road. Novotroyenka is the nearest rural locality.
