= Novotroyenka =

Novotroyenka Новотроенка
- Selo
- Location within Altai Krai Location within Russia
- Coordinates: 51°50′N 83°19′E
- Country: Russia
- Region: Altai Krai
- District: Ust-Kalmansky District
- Time zone: UTC+7:00

Novotroyenka (Russian: Новотроенка) is a rural locality (a selo) in Novokalmansky Selsoviet, Ust-Kalmansky District, Altai Krai, Russia. The population was 42 as of 2013. There are 3 streets.

== Geography ==
Novotroyenka is located 34 km south of Ust-Kalmanka (the district's administrative centre) by road. Novokalmanka is the nearest rural locality.
