= Vostochny, Ust-Kalmansky District, Altai Krai =

Vostochny Восточный
- Settlement
- Location within Altai Krai Location within Russia
- Coordinates: 52°03′N 83°30′E
- Country: Russia
- Region: Altai Krai
- District: Ust-Kalmansky District
- Time zone: UTC+7:00

Vostochny (Russian: Восточный) is a rural locality (a settlement) in Priozyorny Selsoviet, Ust-Kalmansky District, Altai Krai, Russia. The population was 176 as of 2013. There are 2 streets.

== Geography ==
Vostochny is located 21 km southeast of Ust-Kalmanka (the district's administrative centre) by road. Priozyorny is the nearest rural locality.
