= Novoburanovo =

Novoburanovo Новобураново
- Selo
- Location within Altai Krai Location within Russia
- Coordinates: 51°56′N 83°02′E
- Country: Russia
- Region: Altai Krai
- District: Ust-Kalmansky District
- Time zone: UTC+7:00

Novoburanovo (Russian: Новобураново) is a rural locality (a selo) and the administrative center of Novoburanovsky Selsoviet, Ust-Kalmansky District, Altai Krai, Russia. The population was 774 as of 2013. There are 18 streets.

== Geography ==
Novoburanovo is located 36 km southwest of Ust-Kalmanka (the district's administrative centre) by road. Yeltsovka is the nearest rural locality.
