= Ponomaryovo =

Ponomaryovo Пономарёво
- Selo
- Location within Altai Krai Location within Russia
- Coordinates: 52°04′N 83°09′E
- Country: Russia
- Region: Altai Krai
- District: Ust-Kalmansky District
- Time zone: UTC+7:00

Ponomaryovo (Russian: Пономарёво) is a rural locality (a selo) and the administrative center of Ponomaryovsky Selsoviet, Ust-Kalmansky District, Altai Krai, Russia. The population was 462 as of 2013. There are 15 streets.

== Geography ==
Ponomaryovo is located 23 km southwest of Ust-Kalmanka (the district's administrative centre) by road. Ust-Kamyshenka is the nearest rural locality.
