= Slyudyanka (inhabited locality) =

Slyudyanka (Russian: Слюдянка) is the name of several inhabited localities in Russia:

Urban localities

- Slyudyanka, a town in Slyudyansky District of Irkutsk Oblast; 51°39′24″N 103°43′07″E

Rural localities

- Slyudyanka, Altai Krai, a selo in Mikhaylovsky Selsoviet of Ust-Kalmansky District in Altai Krai; 51°52′24″N 83°39′31″E
- Slyudyanka, Mamsko-Chuysky District, Irkutsk Oblast, a settlement in Mamsko-Chuysky District of Irkutsk Oblast; 57°58′16″N 112°46′14″E
