= Ust-Yermilikha =

Ust-Yermilikha Усть-Ермилиха
- Selo
- Location within Altai Krai Location within Russia
- Coordinates: 52°01′N 82°52′E
- Country: Russia
- Region: Altai Krai
- District: Ust-Kalmansky District
- Time zone: UTC+7:00

Ust-Yermilikha (Russian: Усть-Ермилиха) is a rural locality (a selo) in Kabanovsky Selsoviet, Ust-Kalmansky District, Altai Krai, Russia. The population was 77 as of 2013. There is 1 street.

== Geography ==
Ust-Yermilikha is located 41 km southwest of Ust-Kalmanka (the district's administrative centre) by road. Buranovo is the nearest rural locality.
