= Yeltsovka, Ust-Kalmansky District, Altai Krai =

Yeltsovka Ельцовка
- Selo
- Location within Altai Krai Location within Russia
- Coordinates: 51°57′N 83°11′E
- Country: Russia
- Region: Altai Krai
- District: Ust-Kalmansky District
- Time zone: UTC+7:00

Yeltsovka (Russian: Ельцовка) is a rural locality (a selo) in Kabanovsky Selsoviet, Ust-Kalmansky District, Altai Krai, Russia. The population was 190 as of 2013. There are 2 streets.

== Geography ==
Yeltsovka is located 23 km south of Ust-Kalmanka (the district's administrative centre) by road. Ust-Kamyshenka is the nearest rural locality.
