= Stepnoy, Ust-Kalmansky District, Altai Krai =

Stepnoy Степной
- Settlement
- Location within Altai Krai Location within Russia
- Coordinates: 52°09′N 83°11′E
- Country: Russia
- Region: Altai Krai
- District: Ust-Kalmansky District
- Time zone: UTC+7:00

Stepnoy (Russian: Степной) is a rural locality (a settlement) in Charyshsky Selsoviet, Ust-Kalmansky District, Altai Krai, Russia. The population was 88 as of 2013. There are 4 streets.

== Geography ==
Stepnoy is located 16 km northwest of Ust-Kalmanka (the district's administrative centre) by road. Charyshskoye is the nearest rural locality.
