= Antonín Kinský =

Antonín Kinský may refer to:

- Antonín Kinský (footballer, born 1975), Czech former football goalkeeper
- Antonín Kinský (footballer, born 2003), Czech football goalkeeper for Tottenham Hotspur, and son of the above
