= Slyudyanka, Altai Krai =

Slyudyanka Слюдянка
- Selo
- Location within Altai Krai Location within Russia
- Coordinates: 51°52′54″N 83°39′31″E
- Country: Russia
- Region: Altai Krai
- District: Ust-Kalmansky District
- Time zone: UTC+7:00

Slyudyanka (Russian: Слюдянка) is a rural locality (a selo) in Mikhaylovsky Selsoviet, Ust-Kalmansky District, Altai Krai, Russia. The population was 117 as of 2013. There are 2 streets.

== Geography ==
Slyudyanka is located 47 km southeast of Ust-Kalmanka (the district's administrative centre) by road. Ogni is the nearest rural locality.
