= Stepnovsky =

Stepnovsky (masculine), Stepnovskaya (feminine), or Stepnovskoye (neuter) may refer to:

- Stepnovsky District, a district of Stavropol Krai, Russia
- Stepnovsky (rural locality), a rural locality (a settlement) in Volgograd Oblast, Russia
