= Vitali Chilyushkin =

Russian footballer

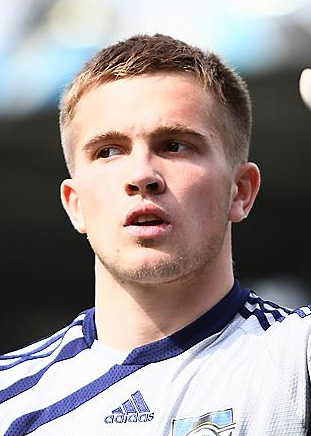

Personal information
- Full name: Vitali Sergeyevich Chilyushkin
- Date of birth: 21 January 1990 (age 36)
- Place of birth: Kabanovo, Moscow Region, Soviet Union
- Height: 1.77 m (5 ft 10 in)
- Position: Goalkeeper

Youth career
- Master-Saturn Yegoryevsk

Senior career*
Years	Team	Apps	(Gls)
2010	FC Saturn Ramenskoye	4	(0)
2011	FC Sibir Novosibirsk	0	(0)
2011–2012	FC Torpedo Vladimir	22	(0)
2012–2014	FC Volgar Astrakhan	7	(0)
2014–2015	FC Saturn Ramenskoye	10	(0)
2015–2021	FC Znamya Truda Orekhovo-Zuyevo	106	(0)
2021	FC Znamya Noginsk	10	(0)

International career
2009	Russia U-19	7	(0)
2010	Russia U-20	1	(0)
- * Club domestic league appearances and goals

Vitali Sergeyevich Chilyushkin (Russian: Виталий Серге́евич Чилюшкин; born 21 January 1990) is a Russian former footballer who played as a goalkeeper.

== Career ==
Chilyushkin made his debut in the Russian Premier League on 2 May 2010 for FC Saturn Moscow Oblast in the game against Zenit. He came on as a substitute late in the first half after Artem Rebrov, himself a second choice after Czech Antonín Kinský, was sent off for a professional foul.
