= 22nd Guards Spetsnaz Brigade =

22nd Separate Guards Order of Zhukov Special Purpose Brigade
- 22nd Spetsnaz Brigade Patch
- Founded: July 24, 1976
- Country: Russia
- Branch: Russian Ground Forces
- Type: Spetsnaz
- Role: Special reconnaissance Special operations Direct action
- Part of: GRU (operational subordination)
- Garrison/HQ: Stepnoy, Russia
- Anniversaries: July 24th
- Engagements: Soviet–Afghan War; Black January; First Nagorno-Karabakh War; Angolan Civil War; First Chechen War; Civil war in Tajikistan; Second Chechen War; Russo-Georgian War; Russo-Ukrainian War; Wagner Group rebellion

Commanders
- Current commander: Lt. Col. Aleksei Nikolayevich Savchenko
- Notable commanders: Col. Boris Kerimbaev

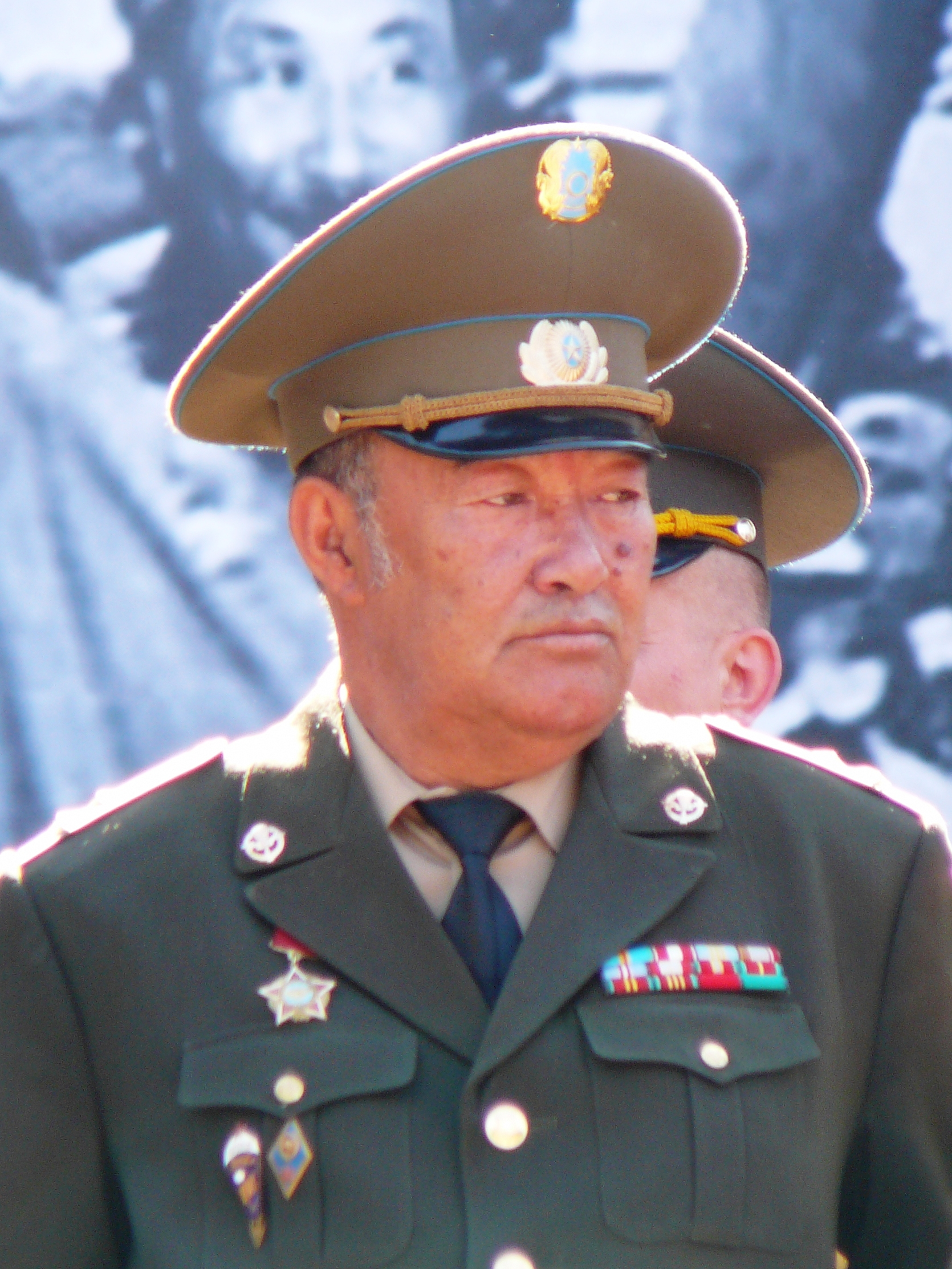
Colonel Boris Kerimbaev was commander of the brigade from 1981–1983.

The 22nd Separate Guards Order of Zhukov Special Purpose Brigade (Russian: 22-я отдельная гвардейская ордена Жукова бригада специального назначения, romanized: 22-ya otdelnaya gvardeyskaya ordena Zhukova brigada spetsialnogo naznacheniya) is a special forces (spetsnaz) brigade of the Armed Forces of the Russian Federation. The brigade is currently based at Stepnoy, Rostov Oblast.

== Structure ==
As of 2020, the brigade is based at Stepnoy, Rostov Oblast, in the Southern Military District. Currently, the brigade consists of:

- 22nd Guards Spetsnaz Brigade
  - Brigade HQ
    - Signals Company
    - Support Company
    - Special Weapons Company
    - Logistics Unit
    - Engineer Unit
  - 108th Spetsnaz Detachment
  - 173rd Spetsnaz Detachment
  - 305th Spetsnaz Detachment
  - 411th Spetsnaz Detachment

== History ==
It was established at Kapchagai in the Turkestan Military District on 22 July 1976. On 3 April 1978 it became a separate unit. In 1983, elements of the brigade temporarily deployed to Cuba.

=== Soviet–Afghan War ===
On 15 March 1985, it was moved to Lashkar Gah and fought in the Soviet–Afghan War. The brigade received a zone of responsibility of 1,100 km along the front and 250 km in depth towards Pakistan. Part of the brigade began fighting in April 1985, having stood in the way of caravans of weapons and drugs coming from Pakistan and Iran.

Formed in December 1986, the 411th detachment, deployed in the province of Farah, was responsible for controlling the caravan routes from Iran. In total, the 22nd brigade alone lost 199 troops in Afghanistan and killed more than 5,000 Mujahideen.

=== Other conflicts ===
In 1989, elements of the brigade deployed to participate in the Angolan Civil War. In August 1988, the brigade moved to Pirəkəşkül in Azerbaijan and participated in the First Nagorno-Karabakh War. Elements of the brigade have participated in the Black January, the First Chechen War, where it took part in the Kizlyar-Pervomayskoye hostage crisis. The Brigade returned to participate in the Second Chechen War. In 2001, the brigade received its Guards title in gratitude for its actions in Chechenya.

In June 1992, the brigade moved to Stepnoy, Rostov Oblast in the Southern Military District, where it is still located today.

== See also ==
- Spetsnaz
- Special Operations Forces (Russia)
