= Kabanovo =

Kabanovo Кабаново
- Selo
- Location within Altai Krai Location within Russia
- Coordinates: 52°02′N 83°06′E
- Country: Russia
- Region: Altai Krai
- District: Ust-Kalmansky District
- Time zone: UTC+7:00

Kabanovo (Russian: Кабаново) is a rural locality (a selo) and the administrative center of Kabanovsky Selsoviet, Ust-Kalmansky District, Altai Krai, Russia. The population was 650 as of 2013. There are 9 streets.

== Geography ==
Kabanovo is located 24 km southwest of Ust-Kalmanka (the district's administrative centre) by road. Ust-Kamyshenka is the nearest rural locality.
