= Stepnoye, Stavropol Krai =

Rural locality in Stavropol Krai, Russia

Coordinates: 44°16′10″N 44°35′35″E

Stepnoye (Russian: Степное) is a rural locality (a selo) and the administrative center of Stepnovsky District, Stavropol Krai, Russia. Population: 5,611 (2010 census); 5,951 (2002 census); 5,148 (1989 Soviet census).
