= Stepnoy, Leninsky District, Volgograd Oblast =

Stepnoy Степной
- Settlement
- Location within Volgograd Oblast Location within Russia
- Coordinates: 48°55′N 45°35′E
- Country: Russia
- Region: Volgograd Oblast
- District: Leninsky District
- Time zone: UTC+4:00

Stepnoy (Russian: Степной) is a rural locality (a settlement) and the administrative center of Stepnovskoye Rural Settlement, Leninsky District, Volgograd Oblast, Russia. The population was 749 as of 2010. There are 18 streets.

== Geography ==
The village is located on Caspian Depression, 100 km from Volgograd, 45 km from Leninsk.
