= Stepnoy, Astrakhan Oblast =

Stepnoy Степной
- Settlement
- Location within Astrakhan Oblast Location within Russia
- Coordinates: 46°41′N 48°10′E
- Country: Russia
- Region: Astrakhan Oblast
- District: Krasnoyarsky District
- Time zone: UTC+4:00

Stepnoy (Russian: Степной) is a rural locality (a settlement) and the administrative center of Aksaraysky Selsoviet, Krasnoyarsky District, Astrakhan Oblast, Russia. The population was 62 as of 2010. There are 17 streets.

== Geography ==
It is located 61 km from Astrakhan, 28 km from Krasny Yar.
