= Yeltsovka, Shipunovsky District, Altai Krai =

Yeltsovka Ельцовка
- Selo
- Location within Altai Krai Location within Russia
- Coordinates: 51°54′N 82°23′E
- Country: Russia
- Region: Altai Krai
- District: Shipunovsky District
- Time zone: UTC+7:00

Yeltsovka (Russian: Ельцовка) is a rural locality (a selo) and the administrative center of Yeltsovsky Selsoviet, Shipunovsky District, Altai Krai, Russia. The population was 605 as of 2013. It was founded in 1712. There are 11 streets.

== Geography ==
Yeltsovka is located 56 km south of Shipunovo (the district's administrative centre) by road. Kachusovo and Ilyinka are the nearest rural localities.
