= Stepnoy, Novonikolayevsky District, Volgograd Oblast =

Stepnoy Степной
- Khutor
- Location within Volgograd Oblast Location within Russia
- Coordinates: 50°58′N 42°53′E
- Country: Russia
- Region: Volgograd Oblast
- District: Novonikolayevsky District
- Time zone: UTC+4:00

Stepnoy (Russian: Степной) is a rural locality (a khutor) in Khopyorskoye Rural Settlement, Novonikolayevsky District, Volgograd Oblast, Russia. The population was 84 as of 2010. There are 2 streets.

== Geography ==
Stepnoy is located in steppe, on the Khopyorsko-Buzulukskaya Plain, 50 km east of Novonikolayevsky (the district's administrative centre) by road. Khopyorsky is the nearest rural locality.
