= Stepnoy, Zabaykalsky Krai =

Stepnoy Степной
- Settlement
- Location within Zabaykalsky Krai Location within Russia
- Coordinates: 50°00′N 117°28′E
- Country: Russia
- Region: Zabaykalsky Krai
- District: Zabaykalsky District
- Time zone: UTC+9:00

Stepnoy (Russian: Степной) is a rural locality (a settlement) in Zabaykalsky District, Zabaykalsky Krai, Russia. Population: 332 (2021 census); 559 (2010 census); There are 7 streets in this settlement.

== Geography ==
This rural locality is located 41 km from Zabaykalsk (the district's administrative centre), 362 km from Chita (capital of Zabaykalsky Krai) and 5,742 km from Moscow. Verkhny Kaltan is the nearest rural locality.
