= Stepnoye, Rodinsky District, Altai Krai =

Stepnoye Степное
- Selo
- Location within Altai Krai Location within Russia
- Coordinates: 52°38′N 80°28′E
- Country: Russia
- Region: Altai Krai
- District: Rodinsky District
- Time zone: UTC+7:00

Stepnoye (Russian: Степное) is a rural locality (a selo) and the administrative center of Stepnovsky Selsoviet, Rodinsky District, Altai Krai, Russia. The population was 1,401 as of 2013. There are 23 streets.

== Geography ==
Stepnoye is located 26 km northeast of Rodino (the district's administrative centre) by road. Chernyavka is the nearest rural locality.
