= Stepnovsky (rural locality) =

Stepnovsky Степновский
- Settlement
- Location within Volgograd Oblast Location within Russia
- Coordinates: 49°56′N 45°49′E
- Country: Russia
- Region: Volgograd Oblast
- District: Nikolayevsky District
- Time zone: UTC+4:00

Stepnovsky (Russian: Степновский) is a rural locality (a settlement) and the administrative center of Stepnovskoye Rural Settlement, Nikolayevsky District, Volgograd Oblast, Russia. The population was 1,146 as of 2010. There are 19 streets.

== Geography ==
Stepnovsky is located on the Transvolga, on Caspian Depression, 46 km southeast of Nikolayevsk (the district's administrative centre) by road. Put Ilyicha is the nearest rural locality.
