= Stepnoy, Pervomaysky District, Altai Krai =

Stepnoy Степной
- Settlement
- Location within Altai Krai Location within Russia
- Coordinates: 53°39′N 84°12′E
- Country: Russia
- Region: Altai Krai
- District: Pervomaysky District
- Time zone: UTC+7:00

Stepnoy (Russian: Степной) is a rural locality (a settlement) in Sorochelogovskoy Selsoviet, Pervomaysky District, Altai Krai, Russia. The population was 1 as of 2013. There is 1 street.

== Geography ==
Stepnoy is located 34 km northeast of Novoaltaysk (the district's administrative centre) by road. Logovskoye is the nearest rural locality.
