= Stepnoy, Mechetlinsky District, Republic of Bashkortostan =

Stepnoy Степной
- Village
- Location within Bashkortostan Location within Russia
- Coordinates: 56°02′N 58°07′E
- Country: Russia
- Region: Bashkortostan
- District: Mechetlinsky District
- Time zone: UTC+5:00

Stepnoy (Russian: Степной) is a rural locality (a village) in Bolsheokinsky Selsoviet, Mechetlinsky District, Bashkortostan, Russia. The population was 190 as of 2010. There are 2 streets.

== Geography ==
Stepnoy is located 20 km northwest of Bolsheustyikinskoye (the district's administrative centre) by road. Bolshaya Oka is the nearest rural locality.
