= Ilya Trunin =

Russian footballer

Personal information
- Full name: Ilya Aleksandrovich Trunin
- Date of birth: 25 May 1992 (age 34)
- Place of birth: Izhevsk, Russia
- Height: 1.92 m (6 ft 4 in)
- Position: Goalkeeper

Youth career
- FC Sibir Novosibirsk

Senior career*
Years	Team	Apps	(Gls)
2011	FC Sibir-2 Novosibirsk	21	(0)
2012–2017	FC Sibir Novosibirsk	36	(0)
2015–2016	→ FC Sibir-2 Novosibirsk (loan)	9	(0)
2017–2018	FC Fakel Voronezh	12	(0)
2018–2019	FC Neftekhimik Nizhnekamsk	2	(0)
2019–2020	FC Novosibirsk	3	(0)
2021	PFC Dynamo Stavropol	15	(0)
2021–2024	FC Murom	40	(0)

International career
2013	Russia U21	2	(0)
- * Club domestic league appearances and goals

Ilya Aleksandrovich Trunin (Russian: Илья Александрович Трунин; born 25 May 1992) is a Russian former football goalkeeper.

== Club career ==
He made his debut in the Russian Second Division for FC Sibir-2 Novosibirsk on 23 April 2011 in a game against FC KUZBASS Kemerovo.

He made his Russian Football National League debut for FC Sibir Novosibirsk on 12 May 2012 in a game against FC Shinnik Yaroslavl.
