= Basel Abdoulfattakh =

Russian footballer

Basel Abdulfattakh
Personal information
- Full name: Basel Mansurovich Abdoulfattakh
- Date of birth: 6 March 1990 (age 36)
- Place of birth: Leningrad, USSR
- Height: 1.84 m (6 ft 0 in)
- Position: Defender

Youth career
- Kirovets SPb
- Smena SPb

Senior career*
Years	Team	Apps	(Gls)
2007–2010	FC Zenit Saint Petersburg	0	(0)
2011–2012	FC Krylia Sovetov Samara	7	(0)
2012	→ FC Yenisey Krasnoyarsk (loan)	4	(0)
2012	FC Yenisey Krasnoyarsk	3	(0)
2013–2014	FC Chernomorets Novorossiysk	40	(2)
2014–2015	FC Dynamo Saint Petersburg	20	(0)
2016	Al-Jaish SC	5	(2)

International career
2010–2011	Russia U-21	4	(0)
- * Club domestic league appearances and goals

Basel Mansurovich Abdoulfattakh (Russian: Басель Мансурович Абдульфаттах; born 6 March 1990) is a Russian former professional association football player.

His father is of Syrian descent and his mother is Russian.

== Career ==
He made his Russian Premier League debut on 9 April 2011 for FC Krylia Sovetov Samara in a game against FC Lokomotiv Moscow.

On 30 June 2014, Abdoulfattakh signed long-term deal with Russian Football National League outfit Dynamo St. Petersburg.

He retired at the end of 2016 after failing to gain eligibility from FIFA to play for the Syria national football team.
