= Stepnoy, Mukhorshibirsky District, Republic of Buryatia =

Stepnoy Степной
- Settlement
- Location within Republic of Buryatia Location within Russia
- Coordinates: 51°13′N 108°12′E
- Country: Russia
- Region: Republic of Buryatia
- District: Mukhorshibirsky District
- Time zone: UTC+8:00

Stepnoy (Russian: Степной) is a rural locality (a settlement) in Mukhorshibirsky District, Republic of Buryatia, Russia. The population was 113 as of 2010. There are 7 streets.

== Geography ==
Stepnoy is located 49 km northeast of Mukhorshibir (the district's administrative centre) by road. Tugnuy is the nearest rural locality.
