= Stepnoy, Uryupinsky District, Volgograd Oblast =

Stepnoy Степной
- Khutor
- Location within Volgograd Oblast Location within Russia
- Coordinates: 50°49′N 42°13′E
- Country: Russia
- Region: Volgograd Oblast
- District: Uryupinsky District
- Time zone: UTC+4:00

Stepnoy (Russian: Степной) is a rural locality (a khutor) in Krasnyaynskoye Rural Settlement, Uryupinsky District, Volgograd Oblast, Russia. The population was 11 as of 2010.

== Geography ==
Stepnoy is located in steppe, 16 km northeast of Uryupinsk (the district's administrative centre) by road. Serkovsky is the nearest rural locality.
