= Stepnoy, Gorodishchensky District, Volgograd Oblast =

Stepnoy Степной
- Settlement
- Location within Volgograd Oblast Location within Russia
- Coordinates: 48°51′N 44°13′E
- Country: Russia
- Region: Volgograd Oblast
- District: Gorodishchensky District
- Time zone: UTC+4:00

Stepnoy (Russian: Степной) is a rural locality (a settlement) and the administrative center of Rossoshenskoye Rural Settlement, Gorodishchensky District, Volgograd Oblast, Russia. The population was 2,273 as of 2010. There are 35 streets.

== Geography ==
Stepnoy is located in steppe, 33 km northwest of Gorodishche (the district's administrative centre) by road. Krasny Pakhar is the nearest rural locality.
