= Artyom Anisimov (footballer) =

Russian footballer

Personal information
- Full name: Artyom Vitalyevich Anisimov
- Date of birth: 30 January 1991 (age 35)
- Place of birth: Saratov, Russian SFSR
- Height: 1.78 m (5 ft 10 in)
- Position: Midfielder

Youth career
- UOR Master-Saturn Yegoryevsk

Senior career*
Years	Team	Apps	(Gls)
2007–2009	FC Master-Saturn Yegoryevsk		
2009–2010	FC Saturn Ramenskoye	0	(0)
2011–2012	FC Volga Nizhny Novgorod	0	(0)
2012	FC Molniya Saratov		
2013	FC Iskra Engels (amateur)		
2014	FC Salyut Saratov (amateur)		
- * Club domestic league appearances and goals

Artyom Vitalyevich Anisimov (Russian: Артем Витальевич Анисимов; born 30 January 1991) is a former Russian footballer.

== Career ==
Anisimov made his professional debut for FC Saturn Ramenskoye on 14 July 2010 in the Russian Cup game against FC Sakhalin Yuzhno-Sakhalinsk.
