= Stepnoy, Kalachyovsky District, Volgograd Oblast =

Stepnoy Степной
- Khutor
- Location within Volgograd Oblast Location within Russia
- Coordinates: 48°34′N 43°47′E
- Country: Russia
- Region: Volgograd Oblast
- District: Kalachyovsky District
- Time zone: UTC+4:00

Stepnoy (Russian: Степной) is a rural locality (a khutor) in Sovetskoye Rural Settlement, Kalachyovsky District, Volgograd Oblast, Russia. The population was 387 as of 2010. There are 7 streets.

== Geography ==
Stepnoy is located 40 km southeast of Kalach-na-Donu (the district's administrative centre) by road. Volgodonskoy is the nearest rural locality.
