= Stepnoy, Khaybullinsky District, Republic of Bashkortostan =

Stepnoy Степной
- Selo
- Location within Bashkortostan Location within Russia
- Coordinates: 51°49′N 58°08′E
- Country: Russia
- Region: Bashkortostan
- District: Khaybullinsky District
- Time zone: UTC+5:00

Stepnoy (Russian: Степной) is a rural locality (a selo) in Akyarsky Selsoviet, Khaybullinsky District, Bashkortostan, Russia. The population was 756 as of 2010. There are 8 streets.

== Geography ==
Stepnoy is located 7 km southwest of Akyar (the district's administrative centre) by road. Akyar is the nearest rural locality.
