= Stepnovsky District =

Stepnovsky District Степновский район
- District
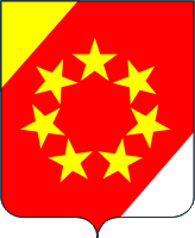
- Flag Coat of arms
- Location of Stepnovsky District in Stavropol Krai
- Coordinates: 44°16′N 44°35′E
- Country: Russia
- Federal subject: Stavropol Krai
- Established: 1972
- Administrative center: Stepnoye

Area
  - Total: 1,887 km^{2} (729 sq mi)

Population (2010 Census)
  - Total: 22,192
  - Density: 11.76/km^{2} (30.46/sq mi)
  - Urban: 0%
  - Rural: 100%

Administrative structure
  - Administrative divisions: 6 Selsoviets
  - Inhabited localities: 21 rural localities

Municipal structure
  - Municipally incorporated as: Stepnovsky Municipal District
  - Municipal divisions: 0 urban settlements, 7 rural settlements
- Time zone: UTC+3 (MSK)
- OKTMO ID: 07652000
- Website: http://www.stepnoe.ru

Stepnovsky District (Russian: Степно́вский райо́н) is an administrative district (raion), one of the twenty-six in Stavropol Krai, Russia. Municipally, it is incorporated as Stepnovsky Municipal District. It is located in the southeast of the krai. The area of the district is 1,887 square kilometers (729 sq mi). Its administrative center is the rural locality (a selo) of Stepnoye. Population: 22,192 (2010 Census); 23,315 (2002 Census); 19,520 (1989 Census). The population of Stepnoye accounts for 25.3% of the district's total population.
