= Antonín Kinský (footballer, born 1975) =

Czech footballer (born 1975)

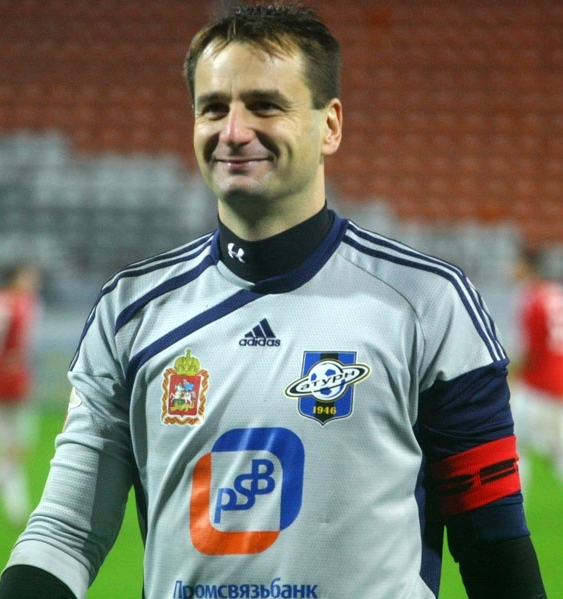
- Kinský with Saturn Ramenskoye in 2009

Personal information
- Full name: Antonín Kinský
- Date of birth: 31 May 1975 (age 51)
- Place of birth: Prague, Czechoslovakia
- Height: 1.87 m (6 ft 2 in)
- Position: Goalkeeper

Youth career
- 1981–1984: Dukla Prague
- 1985–1992: Bohemians 1905
- 1993–1994: Motorlet Prague
- 1994–1995: EMĚ Mělník

Senior career*
Years	Team	Apps	(Gls)
1995–1996	FC Příbram	30	(0)
1996–1998	FC Dukla	42	(0)
1998–2003	Slovan Liberec	115	(0)
2004–2010	Saturn Ramenskoye	182	(0)
Total		369	(0)

International career
1992	Czechoslovakia U17	2	(0)
1997	Czech Republic U21	3	(0)
2002–2004	Czech Republic	5	(0)
2006	Czech Republic A2	1	(0)
Medal record
Men's football
Representing Czech Republic
UEFA European Championship
Bronze medal – third place	2004 Portugal
- * Club domestic league appearances and goals

Antonín Kinský (born 31 May 1975) is a Czech former professional footballer who played as a goalkeeper. He played club football in the Czech Republic for nine seasons, winning the national league in 2002 with FC Slovan Liberec. He subsequently moved to Russia, where he played for Saturn Ramenskoye. During his seven years in Russia, he played 200 competitive games and was recognised as the Russian Premier League's best goalkeeper in the 2007 season.

Kinský played for his country on five occasions. He was part of the Czech Republic squad at UEFA Euro 2004 and the 2006 FIFA World Cup, although he played at neither tournament.

== Club career ==
=== Early career ===
Kinský played for a number of clubs in his early career, including Dukla Prague, after which he moved to Bohemians 1905. He later spent time on loan at Motorlet Prague and EMĚ Mělník. Kinský won promotion with FC Dukla to the Czech First League, where he played for one season.

=== Liberec ===
Kinský joined FC Slovan Liberec in 1998, reaching the final of the 1998–99 Czech Cup in his first season. In the summer of 1999 Kinský broke his thumb, resultantly not playing for the autumn half of the 1999–2000 season and subsequently sharing goalkeeping duties with Zbyněk Hauzr in the spring. Liberec finished the season by winning the 1999–2000 Czech Cup.

In July 2000, Kinský was diagnosed with infectious mononucleosis, receiving treatment at the military hospital in Prague and resultantly being unable to play in the autumn part of the 2000–01 season. The following season, he recorded consecutive clean sheets at the beginning of the campaign. Liberec went on to reach the quarter finals of the 2001–02 UEFA Cup and won the 2001–02 Czech First League.

During a UEFA Cup match in the Georgian capital of Tbilisi in October 2002, Kinský was targeted by bottles thrown onto the pitch from the crowd as the home team was defeated 1–0 in the match and 4–2 on aggregate. Three policemen were injured in the incident. He played in goal in a 4–0 league defeat against Viktoria Žižkov in October 2002, a game he described as "probably the worst match in my life." November 2002 was more successful for Kinský as he saved two penalties in a UEFA Cup penalty shootout, after the second round tie against Ipswich Town had ended level after extra time. Resultantly Liberec qualified for the third round of the competition, although Kinský missed both matches against Panathinaikos due to injury. Kinský's contract at Liberec was due to expire in the summer of 2004 and he failed to agree a contract extension with the club during the 2003–04 season. He left having made a total of 137 appearances in the top division of Czech football.

=== Russia ===
Kinský joined Russian side Saturn Ramenskoye in January 2004, initially signing a three-year contract. Kinský joined the team on 6 January in Turkey at their training camp ahead of the 2004 Russian Premier League. He started the first six matches of the 2004 season as a substitute, before becoming the club's first-choice goalkeeper. In 2005, he was vice captain for the team, captaining the side in the absence of captain Viktor Onopko.

Following the 2006 World Cup, Kinský signed a contract extension to stay at the club for another three years. He was named the best goalkeeper of the Russian Football Premier League in 2007. He kept his 100th top division clean sheet in a match against Tomsk in September 2008, becoming the 17th Czech goalkeeper to reach this figure. In October 2008, Kinský was offered the chance to move to Chelsea to be the backup goalkeeper for Petr Čech, an offer which he rejected. In November 2010 Kinský played his 200th competitive match for the club. Before the last game of the 2010 season, he was presented with a football shirt with the number 201 on it, intended to represent the number of games he had played for the club. However, due to injury Kinský was unable to take part in the match, so 200 was his actual number of competitive appearances. He left Saturn upon the expiry of his contract in December 2010.

== International career ==
Kinský played for the under-17 team of Czechoslovakia in 1992, making two appearances. He went on to make three appearances for the Czech Republic national under-21 football team in 1997.

Kinský was called up to the Czech Republic national team by coach Karel Brückner before their participation in two friendly matches in Cyprus in February 2002. He was one of three uncapped goalkeepers named in the squad, the others being Petr Čech and Martin Vaniak. He made his debut in Cyprus on 13 February, playing the second half of the game against the host country in a 4–3 win.

Kinský was named in the Czech Republic squad for two major tournaments, UEFA Euro 2004 and the 2006 FIFA World Cup, but didn't play in either competition. He played in a total of five matches for his national team between 2002 and 2004. He also made one appearance for the "A2" team of his country in 2006, playing the second half of a match against Turkey B on 1 March.

== Post-playing career ==
Kinský became a goalkeeping coach for the youth team of FC Tempo Prague after finishing his playing career, stating his desire to work as a goalkeeping coach in professional football in the future, but not as a head coach.

== Personal life ==
Kinský studied Russian at school. He and his wife, Martina, have two children, Antonín and Andrea, who both took part in sports in their childhood. Antonín Jr. went on to become a professional football goalkeeper, moving to England to play for Tottenham Hotspur in 2025.

== Career statistics ==
=== Club ===
Appearances and goals by club, season and competition
Club	Season	League		
Club	Season	Division	Apps	Goals
FC Příbram (Note: NFT states Dukla Prague, but Dukla Prague did not take part in the 1995–96 Czech 2. Liga.)	1995–96	Czech 2. Liga	30	0
FC Dukla	1996–97	Czech 2. Liga	20	0
FC Dukla	1997–98	Czech First League	22	0
FC Dukla	Total		42	0
Slovan Liberec	1998–99	Czech First League	28	0
Slovan Liberec	1999–2000	Czech First League	5	0
Slovan Liberec	2000–01	Czech First League	13	0
Slovan Liberec	2001–02	Czech First League	30	0 (Note: NFT states one goal but this is not supported by Jeřábek, Mladá fronta DNES or gambrinusliga.cz.)
Slovan Liberec	2002–03	Czech First League	25	0
Slovan Liberec	2003–04	Czech First League	14	0
Slovan Liberec	Total		115	0
Saturn Ramenskoye	2004	Russian Premier League	21	0
Saturn Ramenskoye	2005	Russian Premier League	29	0
Saturn Ramenskoye	2006	Russian Premier League	27	0
Saturn Ramenskoye	2007	Russian Premier League	28	0
Saturn Ramenskoye	2008	Russian Premier League	28	0
Saturn Ramenskoye	2009	Russian Premier League	29	0
Saturn Ramenskoye	2010	Russian Premier League	20	0
Saturn Ramenskoye	Total		182	0
Career total			369	0

=== International ===
Appearances and goals by national team and year
National team	Year	Apps	Goals
Czech Republic	2002	3	0
Czech Republic	2004	2	0
Total		5	0

== Honours ==
Slovan Liberec

- Czech First League: 2001–02
- Czech Cup: 1999–2000

Czech Republic

- UEFA European Championship semi-finalist: 2004
