= Ust-Kalmanka =

Locality in Altai Krai, Russia

Coordinates: 52.122°N 83.309°E

Ust-Kalmanka (Russian: Усть-Калманка) is a rural locality (a selo) and the administrative center of Ust-Kalmansky District of Altai Krai, Russia. Population: 6,371 (2010 census); 6,712 (2002 census); 6,927 (1989 Soviet census).
