= Ust-Kalmansky District =

Ust-Kalmansky District Усть-Калманский район (Russian)
- District
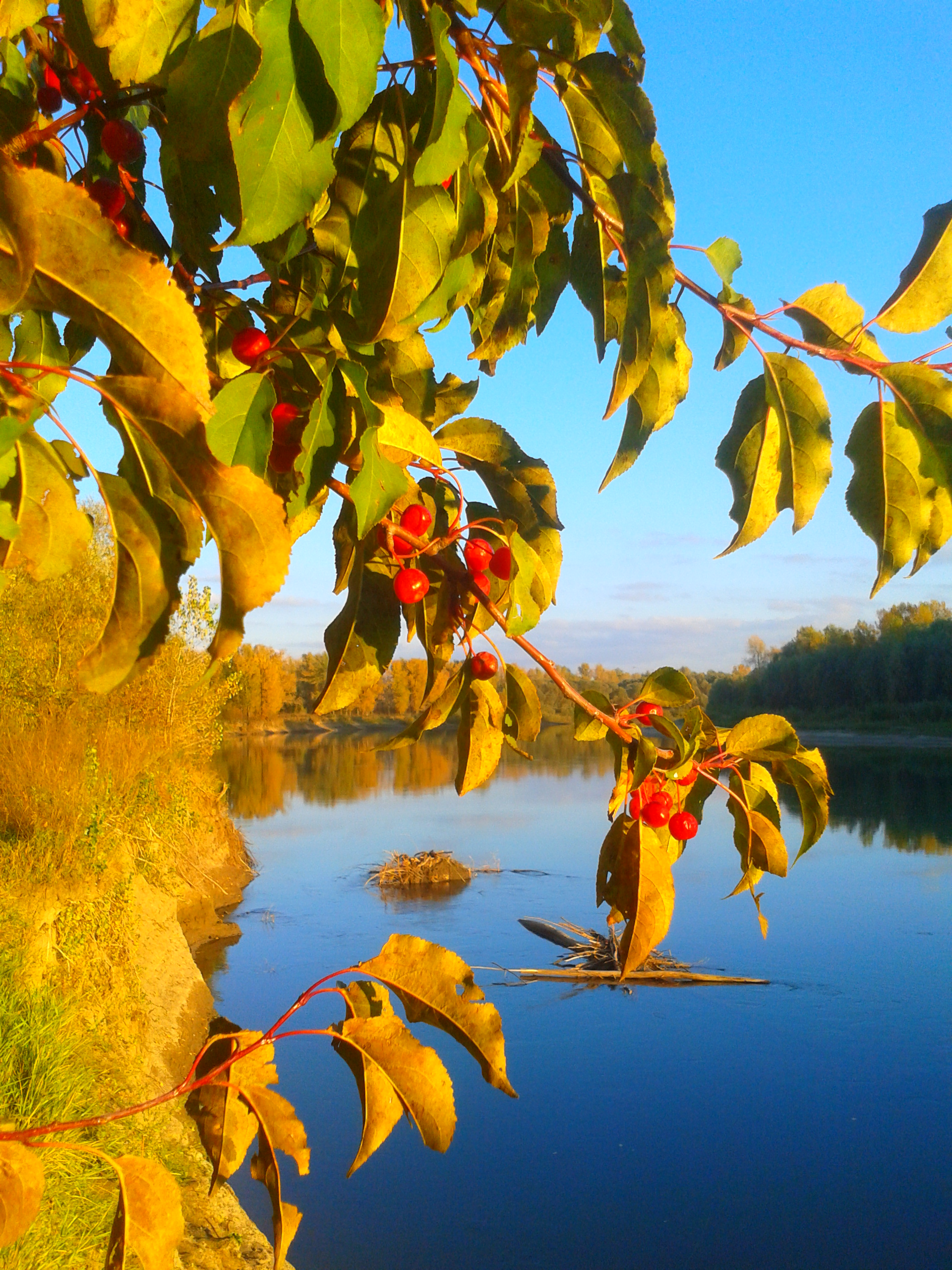
- Landscape in Ust Kalmansky District

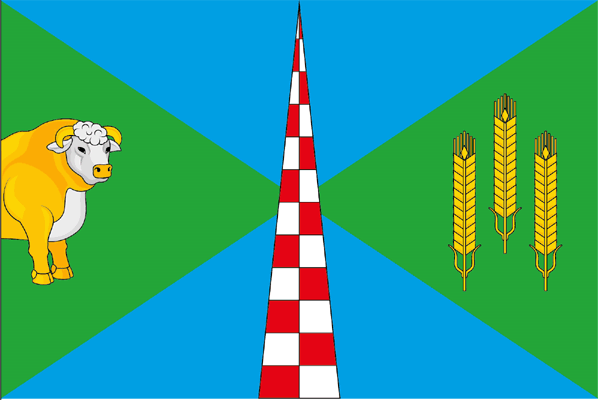
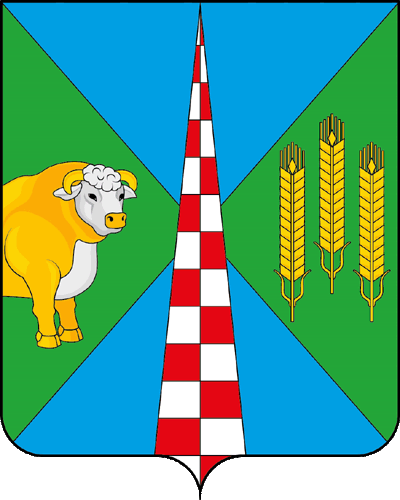
- Flag Coat of arms
- Location of Ust-Kalmansky District in Altai Krai
- Coordinates: 52°06′N 83°18′E
- Country: Russia
- Federal subject: Altai Krai
- Established: 1935
- Administrative center: Ust-Kalmanka

Area
  - Total: 2,300 km^{2} (890 sq mi)

Population (2010 Census)
  - Total: 15,365
  - Density: 6.7/km^{2} (17/sq mi)
  - Urban: 0%
  - Rural: 100%

Administrative structure
  - Administrative divisions: 9 selsoviet
  - Inhabited localities: 22 rural localities

Municipal structure
  - Municipally incorporated as: Ust-Kalmansky Municipal District
  - Municipal divisions: 0 urban settlements, 9 rural settlements
- Time zone: UTC+7 (MSK+4)
- OKTMO ID: 01654000
- Website: http://ust-kalmanka22.ru/

Ust-Kalmansky District (Russian: Усть-Калма́нский райо́н) is an administrative and municipal district (raion), one of the fifty-nine in Altai Krai, Russia. It is located in the center of the krai. The area of the district is 2,300 square kilometers (890 sq mi). Its administrative center is the rural locality (a selo) of Ust-Kalmanka. Population: 15,365 (2010 census); 18,470 (2002 census); 20,144 (1989 Soviet census). The population of Ust-Kalmanka accounts for 41.5% of the district's total population.
