= 2011–12 FC Lokomotiv Moscow season =

Lokomotiv Moscow
2011–12 season
- Chairman: Olga Smorodskaya
- Manager: Yuri Krasnozhan (until 6 June 2011); Vladimir Maminov (26 June – 1 July 2011); José Couceiro (from 1 July 2011)
- Stadium: Lokomotiv Stadium (capacity 28,800)
- Russian Premier League: 7th
- Russian Cup: Quarter-finals vs Rubin
- Europa League: Round of 32 vs Athletic Bilbao
- Top goalscorer: League: Denis Glushakov (11); All: Denis Glushakov (14)
- Highest home attendance: 26,244 vs Spartak; League, 13 May 2012
- Lowest home attendance: 8,279 vs AEK; Europa League, 20 October 2011
| Home colours | Away colours |

The 2011–12 Lokomotiv Moscow season involved the club competing in Russian Premier League, Russian Cup and Europa League.

== Season review ==
- 1 December 2010 (pre-season): after finishing the 2010 season in the 5th place, Yuri Semin is fired, and Yuri Krasnozhan appointed as a new manager.
- 14 May 2011: after 4–0 home victory vs Terek in Matchday 9 Lokomotiv climbs to the 1st place in the table, where remains after Matchday 10.
- 27 May 2011: Lokomotiv loses home game 1–2 to Anzhi in Matchday 11 in the manner, considered by some viewers as odd, and is currently 5th, just 1 point behind leader.
- 6 June 2011: Yuri Krasnozhan is sacked by FC Lokomotiv Moscow Council of Directors.
- 26 June 2011: Vladimir Maminov, appointed as a caretaker manager after dismissal of Yuri Krasnozhan, loses his 3rd game of 5 in charge, leaving team in the 8th place.
- 1 July 2011: José Couceiro signs 2-year-long contract as a new manager of Lokomotiv.
- 17 July – 21 August 2011: first 7 matches with José Couceiro in charge (5 in the League, 1 in Russian Cup and 1 in Europa League) end with clean sheets (5 victories, goals 12–0).
- 23 February: Lokomotiv is eliminated from Europa League after losing to Athletic Bilbao by away goals rule (2–1 at home, 0–1 away).
- 21 March 2012: Lokomotiv is knocked out from Russian Cup after quarter-final defeat 0–4 vs Rubin held at neutral venue due to bad pitch conditions at Central Stadium (Kazan).
- 1 April – 13 May 2012: no wins in last 8 games of season (5 defeats, goals 4–14).
- 14 May 2014: club announces the end of contract with José Couceiro and appointment of Slaven Bilić as a new manager, following Bilić's decision to step down from the post of Croatia national side manager after Euro 2012.

== Players ==
Note: Flags indicate national team as defined under FIFA eligibility rules; some limited exceptions apply. Players may hold more than one non-FIFA nationality.

| No. | Pos. | Nation | Player |
|---|---|---|---|
| 1 | GK | BRA | Guilherme |
| 4 | MF | ESP | Alberto Zapater |
| 5 | DF | RUS | Taras Burlak |
| 6 | MF | RUS | Maksim Grigoryev |
| 7 | MF | RUS | Dmitri Tarasov |
| 8 | MF | RUS | Denis Glushakov |
| 9 | MF | BIH | Senijad Ibričić |
| 10 | MF | RUS | Dmitri Loskov (captain) |
| 11 | FW | RUS | Dmitri Sychev |
| 13 | FW | NGR | Victor Obinna |
| 15 | FW | RUS | Roman Pavlyuchenko |
| 16 | GK | BLR | Anton Amelchenko |
| 18 | MF | RUS | Vladislav Ignatyev |
| 19 | FW | SEN | Baye Djiby Fall |
| 20 | DF | SLO | Branko Ilič |
| 21 | MF | RUS | Dmitri Torbinski |
| 22 | DF | POR | Manuel da Costa |

| No. | Pos. | Nation | Player |
|---|---|---|---|
| 23 | DF | MNE | Marko Baša |
| 24 | DF | RUS | Andrei Ivanov |
| 25 | FW | ECU | Felipe Caicedo |
| 27 | MF | RUS | Magomed Ozdoyev |
| 28 | DF | SVK | Ján Ďurica |
| 33 | GK | BLR | Artem Gomelko |
| 35 | GK | RUS | Aleksandr Filtsov |
| 45 | FW | RUS | Alexander Minchenkov |
| 49 | DF | RUS | Roman Shishkin |
| 50 | DF | RUS | Andrey Eshchenko |
| 51 | DF | RUS | Maksim Belyayev |
| 55 | DF | RUS | Renat Yanbayev |
| 56 | FW | RUS | Georgi Nurov |
| 65 | MF | RUS | Vyacheslav Podberezkin |
| 77 | MF | MDA | Stanislav Ivanov |
| 90 | FW | BRA | Maicon |
| 99 | MF | RUS | Alan Gatagov |

== Transfers ==
=== Winter 2010–11 ===
In: Note: Flags indicate national team as defined under FIFA eligibility rules; some limited exceptions apply. Players may hold more than one non-FIFA nationality.

| No. | Pos. | Nation | Player |
|---|---|---|---|
| 9 | MF | BIH | Senijad Ibričić (from (Croatia) Hajduk Split) |
| 16 | GK | BLR | Anton Amelchenko (from (Russia) Rostov) |
| 17 | FW | RUS | Aleksandr Marenich (from (Russia) Alania Vladikavkaz) |
| 18 | MF | RUS | Vladislav Ignatyev (end of loan to (Russia) Kuban Krasnodar) |
| 19 | FW | SEN | Baye Djiby Fall (end of loan to (Norway) Molde) |
| 24 | DF | RUS | Andrei Ivanov (from (Russia) Spartak Moscow) |
| 30 | MF | RUS | Vitali Dyakov (end of loan to (Russia) Lokomotiv-2 Moscow) |
| 33 | GK | BLR | Artem Gomelko (end of loan to (Belarus) Naftan Novopolotsk) |
| 39 | MF | RUS | Kirill Pavlov (from (Russia) Lokomotiv-2 Moscow) |
| 45 | FW | RUS | Aleksandr Minchenkov (end of loan to (Russia) Dynamo Bryansk) |
| 48 | DF | RUS | Sandro Tsveiba |
| 51 | DF | RUS | Ruslan Nakhushev (from (Russia) Saturn Moscow Oblast) |
| 54 | MF | RUS | Viktor Lipin (from (Russia) Saturn Moscow Oblast) |
| 57 | DF | RUS | Georgi Burnash |
| 58 | MF | RUS | Aleksandr Zakuskin |
| 61 | DF | RUS | Sergei Zuykov |
| 63 | MF | RUS | Panayot Khartiyadi |
| 64 | MF | RUS | Nikita Lapin (from (Russia) Saturn Moscow Oblast) |
| 70 | MF | RUS | Yevgeni Kirisov |
| 73 | MF | RUS | Azret Omarov |
| 75 | DF | RUS | Aleksandr Seraskhov |
| 77 | MF | MDA | Stanislav Ivanov (end of loan to (Russia) Rostov) |
| 80 | FW | RUS | Semyon Sinyavskiy |
| 86 | DF | RUS | Anton Smirnov |
| 87 | DF | RUS | Vladimir Smirnov |
| 89 | DF | RUS | Nikita Samokhvalov |
| 91 | GK | RUS | Aleksandr Vorobyov |
| 92 | MF | RUS | Nikita Dubchak |
| 94 | MF | RUS | Aleksandr Zhizhin |
| 97 | GK | RUS | Yuri Kostrikov |

Out: Note: Flags indicate national team as defined under FIFA eligibility rules; some limited exceptions apply. Players may hold more than one non-FIFA nationality.

| No. | Pos. | Nation | Player |
|---|---|---|---|
| 4 | DF | BRA | Rodolfo (on loan to (Brazil) Grêmio) |
| 6 | DF | SRB | Milan Milanović (to (Italy) Palermo, to be registered in the summer) |
| 13 | MF | BRA | Wágner (to (Turkey) Gaziantepspor) |
| 14 | MF | RUS | Igor Smolnikov (to (Russia) Zhemchuzhina-Sochi) |
| 16 | MF | BRA | Charles (on loan to (Brazil) Santos) |
| 17 | DF | RUS | Dmitri Sennikov (released) |
| 19 | FW | MLI | Dramane Traoré (to (Tunisia) Espérance) |
| 22 | GK | RUS | Aleksandr Krivoruchko (to (Russia) Salyut Belgorod) |
| 30 | DF | GEO | Malkhaz Asatiani (released) |
| 32 | GK | CZE | Marek Čech (to (Russia) Zhemchuzhina-Sochi) |
| 41 | MF | RUS | Ilya Mironov (to (Russia) Krasnodar) |
| 44 | DF | RUS | Ruslan Kambolov (to (Russia) Nizhny Novgorod) |
| 51 | DF | RUS | Maksim Belyayev (on loan to (Russia) Dynamo Bryansk) |
| 54 | GK | RUS | Yegor Generalov (to (Russia) Dynamo Moscow) |
| 64 | MF | RUS | Seyt-Daut Garakoyev (released) |
| 65 | FW | RUS | Dmitri Kukharchuk (to (Russia) Rostov) |
| 68 | GK | RUS | Aleksandr Korshunov (released) |
| 77 | MF | RUS | Arkadi Kalaydzhyan (to (Russia) Kuban Krasnodar) |
| 79 | DF | RUS | Aleksandr Yarkovoy (to (Russia) Lokomotiv-2 Moscow) |
| 88 | MF | UKR | Oleksandr Aliyev (to (Ukraine) Dynamo Kyiv) |
| 98 | MF | RUS | Alan Chochiyev (on loan to (Russia) Volgar-Gazprom Astrakhan) |
| — | DF | RUS | Sergei Yefimov (to (Russia) Lokomotiv-2 Moscow, previously on loan to (Russia) Dynamo Bryansk) |
| — | MF | RUS | Kantemir Berkhamov (to (Russia) Spartak Nalchik, previously on loan to (Russia) Nizhny Novgorod) |
| — | MF | RUS | Denis Voynov (released, previously on loan to (Russia) Lokomotiv-2 Moscow) |
| — | FW | RUS | Semyon Fomin (on loan to (Russia) Torpedo Vladimir, previously on loan to (Russia) Lokomotiv-2 Moscow) |
| — | FW | RUS | Aleksandr Pankovets (to (Russia) Nosta Novotroitsk, previously on loan to (Russia) Lokomotiv-2 Moscow) |
| — | FW | RUS | Artur Sarkisov (on loan to (Russia) Shinnik Yaroslavl, previously with (Russia) Lokomotiv-2 Moscow) |

=== Summer 2011 ===
In: Note: Flags indicate national team as defined under FIFA eligibility rules; some limited exceptions apply. Players may hold more than one non-FIFA nationality.

| No. | Pos. | Nation | Player |
|---|---|---|---|
| 4 | MF | ESP | Alberto Zapater (from (Portugal) Sporting) |
| 13 | FW | NGR | Victor Obinna (from (Italy) Internazionale) |
| 22 | DF | POR | Manuel da Costa (from (England) West Ham United) |
| 25 | FW | ECU | Felipe Caicedo (from (England) Manchester City) |
| 29 | DF | RUS | Igor Golban (from (Russia) Zhemchuzhina-Sochi) |
| 41 | GK | RUS | Miroslav Lobantsev |
| 44 | DF | RUS | Mikhail Borisov |
| 65 | MF | RUS | Vyacheslav Podberyozkin |
| 69 | FW | RUS | Aleksei Turik |
| 79 | DF | RUS | Vitali Lystsov |
| 82 | MF | RUS | Igor Mendelev |
| 88 | DF | RUS | Dmitry Mikhaylenko |
| 93 | DF | RUS | Denis Baryshnikov |
| 95 | DF | RUS | Oleg Murachyov |

Out: Note: Flags indicate national team as defined under FIFA eligibility rules; some limited exceptions apply. Players may hold more than one non-FIFA nationality.

| No. | Pos. | Nation | Player |
|---|---|---|---|
| 15 | MF | GHA | Haminu Draman (to (France) Arles-Avignon) |
| 19 | FW | SEN | Baye Djiby Fall (on loan to (Denmark) OB) |
| 23 | DF | MNE | Marko Baša (to (France) Lille) |
| 33 | GK | BLR | Artem Gomelko (on loan to (Belarus) Torpedo-BelAZ Zhodino) |
| 51 | DF | RUS | Ruslan Nakhushev (on loan to (Russia) Tom Tomsk) |
| 53 | DF | RUS | Andrei Semyonov (to (Russia) CSKA Moscow) |
| 59 | MF | RUS | Aleksandr Vasyukov (to (Russia) CSKA Moscow) |
| 72 | FW | RUS | Soslan Dzhioyev (to (Russia) Alania Vladikavkaz) |
| 81 | MF | RUS | Soslan Gatagov (released) |
| 84 | MF | RUS | Daniil Lezgintsev (released) |
| 99 | MF | RUS | Alan Gatagov (to (Russia) Dynamo Moscow) |
| — | DF | RUS | Maksim Belyayev (on loan to (Russia) Torpedo Vladimir, previously on loan to (Russia) Dynamo Bryansk) |
| — | DF | RUS | Igor Smolnikov (on loan to (Russia) Rostov, previously on loan to (Russia) Zhemchuzhina-Sochi) |
| — | MF | RUS | Semyon Fomin (on loan to (Russia) Spartak Nalchik, previously on loan to (Russia) Torpedo Vladimir) |

=== Winter 2011–12 ===
In: Note: Flags indicate national team as defined under FIFA eligibility rules; some limited exceptions apply. Players may hold more than one non-FIFA nationality.

| No. | Pos. | Nation | Player |
|---|---|---|---|
| 3 | DF | RUS | Aleksandr Yarkovoy (free agent, last team (Russia) Lokomotiv-2 Moscow) |
| 6 | MF | RUS | Maksim Grigoryev (from (Russia) MITOS Novocherkassk) |
| 15 | FW | RUS | Roman Pavlyuchenko (from (England) Tottenham Hotspur) |
| 26 | MF | BLR | Yan Tsiharow (from (Russia) Tom Tomsk) |
| 30 | FW | RUS | Arshak Koryan |
| 32 | FW | RUS | Mikhail Petrusyov (from (Russia) Dnepr Smolensk) |
| 44 | MF | RUS | Aleksei Gorshkov |
| 47 | MF | RUS | Nikita Salamatov |
| 50 | DF | RUS | Andrey Yeshchenko (from (Russia) Volga Nizhny Novgorod) |
| 51 | DF | RUS | Maksim Belyayev (end of loan to (Russia) Torpedo Vladimir) |
| 67 | DF | RUS | Temur Mustafin (from (Russia) Rostov) |
| 72 | FW | RUS | Kamil Mullin |
| 87 | DF | RUS | Vladimir Smirnov |
| — | GK | BLR | Artem Gomelko (end of loan to (Belarus) Torpedo-BelAZ) |
| — | MF | RUS | Semyon Fomin (end of loan to (Russia) Spartak Nalchik) |

Out: Note: Flags indicate national team as defined under FIFA eligibility rules; some limited exceptions apply. Players may hold more than one non-FIFA nationality.

| No. | Pos. | Nation | Player |
|---|---|---|---|
| 17 | FW | RUS | Aleksandr Marenich (released) |
| 20 | DF | SLO | Branko Ilič (released) |
| 24 | DF | RUS | Andrei Ivanov (on loan to (Russia) Tom Tomsk) |
| 30 | DF | RUS | Vitali Dyakov (to (Russia) Rostov) |
| 39 | DF | RUS | Kirill Pavlov (on loan to (Russia) Metallurg-Kuzbass Novokuznetsk) |
| 44 | DF | RUS | Mikhail Borisov (to (Russia) MITOS Novocherkassk) |
| 45 | FW | RUS | Aleksandr Minchenkov (on loan to (Russia) Mordovia Saransk) |
| 56 | FW | RUS | Georgi Nurov (to (Russia) Rubin Kazan) |
| 62 | MF | RUS | Roman Bykov (to (Russia) Shinnik Yaroslavl) |
| 71 | DF | RUS | Aleksei Mamonov (to (Russia) Amkar Perm) |
| 73 | MF | RUS | Azret Omarov (released) |
| 83 | MF | RUS | Aleksei Malkov (released) |
| 96 | FW | RUS | Dmitry Poloz (to (Russia) Rostov) |
| — | MF | BRA | Charles (released, previously on loan to (Brazil) Cruzeiro) |
| — | DF | BRA | Rodolfo (to (Brazil) Vasco da Gama, previously on loan to (Brazil) Grêmio) |
| — | FW | SEN | Djiby Fall (to (Belgium) Lokeren, previously on loan to (Denmark) OB) |
| — | MF | RUS | Igor Smolnikov (to (Russia) Rostov, previously on loan) |

== Competitions ==
=== Legend ===
Win Draw Loss Postponed

=== Russian Premier League ===
==== Results by matchday ====
| Round | 1 | 2 | 3 | 4 | 5 | 6 | 7 | 8 | 9 | 10 | 11 | 12 | 13 | 14 | 15 | 16 | 17 | 18 | 19 | 20 | 21 | 22 | 23 | 24 | 25 | 26 | 27 | 28 | 29 | 30 | 31 | 32 | 33 | 34 | 35 | 36 | 37 | 38 | 39 | 40 | 41 | 42 | 43 | 44 |
|---|---|---|---|---|---|---|---|---|---|---|---|---|---|---|---|---|---|---|---|---|---|---|---|---|---|---|---|---|---|---|---|---|---|---|---|---|---|---|---|---|---|---|---|---|
| Ground | H | A | H | A | H | A | H | A | H | A | H | A | H | H | A | A | H | A | H | A | H | A | H | A | H | A | H | A | A | H | A | A | H | A | H | A | H | H | A | H | A | H | A | H |
| Result | W | L | D | L | W | W | W | D | W | D | L | D | W | L | L | L | W | W | D | D | W | W | W | W | D | W | W | W | L | D | L | L | W | D | W | W | L | L | D | D | L | L | D | L |
| Position | 5 | 8 | 9 | 14 | 8 | 4 | 2 | 4 | 1 | 1 | 5 | 6 | 4 | 6 | 6 | 8 | 7 | 7 | 7 | 8 | 8 | 7 | 6 | 5 | 6 | 5 | 4 | 3 | 5 | 5 | 5 | 6 | 5 | 5 | 3 | 3 | 3 | 5 | 5 | 5 | 6 | 6 | 6 | 7 |

Source: Matches
A = Away; H = Home; W = Win; D = Draw; L = Loss

==== Matches ====
| 12 March 2011 1 | Lokomotiv Moscow | 3–2 | Dynamo Moscow | Moscow |
| 19:30 MSK (UTC+4) | Ďurica 4'; Torbinski (yellow card) 10' (goal) 61'; Burlak 47'; Loskov (yellow card) 56'; Maicon (yellow card) 66'; Ibričić (yellow card) 90+1' | Report | Sapeta (yellow card) 3'; Samedov (yellow card) 35' (goal) 90'; Kurányi 90+1' | Stadium: Lokomotiv Stadium; Attendance: 14,863; Referee: Maksim Layushkin |

| 20 March 2011 2 | Amkar Perm | 1–0 | Lokomotiv Moscow | Perm |
| 15:15 MSK (UTC+4) | Ristić 25'; Volkov (yellow card) 33'; Belorukov (yellow card) 76'; Narubin (yellow card) 89'; Molodtsov (yellow card) 90+3' | Report | | Stadium: Zvezda Stadium; Attendance: 9,000; Referee: Vitaly Meshkov |

| 2 April 2011 3 | Lokomotiv Moscow | 1–1 | Rostov | Moscow |
| 18:30 MSK (UTC+4) | Yanbayev (yellow card) 28'; Ignatyev 74'; Loskov (yellow card) 86' | Report | Khagush (yellow card) 13'; Gațcan (yellow card) 55'; Grigoryev 83' | Stadium: Lokomotiv Stadium; Attendance: 8,500; Referee: Vladimir Pettay |

| 9 April 2011 4 | Krylia Sovetov | 1–0 | Lokomotiv Moscow | Samara |
| 14:00 MSK (UTC+4) | V.Priyomov (yellow card) 16'; Taranov (yellow card) 78'; Đorđević 87' | Report | Ďurica (yellow card) 19'; Burlak (yellow card) 90+3' | Stadium: Metallurg Stadion; Attendance: 14,550; Referee: Vyacheslav Popov |

| 17 April 2011 5 | Lokomotiv Moscow | 1–0 | Volga | Moscow |
| 14:30 MSK (UTC+4) | Loskov (yellow card) 44'; Ozdoyev 82' | Summary | Getigezhev (yellow card) 42' | Stadium: Lokomotiv Stadium; Attendance: 13,064; Referee: Sergey Lapochkin |

| 23 April 2011 6 | Krasnodar | 1–4 | Lokomotiv Moscow | Krasnodar |
| 18:30 MSK (UTC+4) | Shipitsin 83'; Kulchy (yellow card) 85' | Report | Shishkin 7'; Ibričić 44' (pen.); Ignatyev 50'; Ozdoyev (yellow card) 66'; Sychev 75' | Stadium: Kuban Stadium; Attendance: 10,000; Referee: Mikhail Vilkov |

| 30 April 2011 7 | Lokomotiv Moscow | 2–1 | Kuban Krasnodar | Moscow |
| 18:30 MSK (UTC+4) | Maicon 6'; Loskov (yellow card) 52'; Ibričić 62' Ozdoyev (yellow card) 62'; Shishkin (yellow card) 90+1' | Report | Varga (yellow card) 48'; Bucur (yellow card) 64'; Traoré 83'; Zelão (yellow card) 26' (red card) 90+5' | Stadium: Lokomotiv Stadium; Attendance: 12,764; Referee: Vladislav Bezborodov |

| 8 May 2011 8 | Zenit St.Petersburg | 1–1 | Lokomotiv Moscow | Saint Petersburg |
| 20:30 MSK (UTC+4) | Lombaerts (yellow card) 21'; Lazović (yellow card) 51' (goal) 65' (pen.) | Report | Guilherme (yellow card) 35'; Yanbaev (yellow card) 43'; Ďurica (yellow card) 47'; Maicon (yellow card) 51' (goal) 68'; Ivanov (yellow card) 51'; Ibričić (yellow card) 57' | Stadium: Petrovsky Stadium; Attendance: 21,400; Referee: Igor Egorov |

| 14 May 2011 9 | Lokomotiv Moscow | 4–0 | Terek Grozny | Moscow |
| 20:45 MSK (UTC+4) | Shishkin 28', 43'; Burlak (yellow card) 54'; Glushakov 67'; Gatagov 80' | Report | Utsiyev (yellow card) 43' | Stadium: Lokomotiv Stadium; Attendance: 12,217; Referee: Vladislav Bezborodov |

| 19 May 2011 10 | Rubin Kazan | 0–0 | Lokomotiv Moscow | Kazan |
| 20:30 MSK (UTC+4) | | Summary | Kuzmin (yellow card) 90+4' | Stadium: Central Stadium; Attendance: 21,400; Referee: Stanislav Sukhina |

| 27 May 2011 11 | Lokomotiv Moscow | 1–2 | Anzhi | Moscow |
| 19:15 MSK (UTC+4) | Ivanov (yellow card) 29'; Ďurica (yellow card) 75'; Sychev 90' (pen.) | Summary | Tagirbekov 47'; Agalarov (yellow card) 66'; Jucilei (yellow card) 71'; Boussoufa 80'; João Carlos (yellow card) 84' (yellow-red card) 90' | Stadium: Lokomotiv Stadium; Attendance: 15,569; Referee: Vladimir Pettay |

| 9 June 2011 12 | Tom Tomsk | 2–2 | Lokomotiv | Tomsk |
| 15:30 MSK (UTC+4) | Yanbayev 14' (o.g.); Kanunnikov 37'; Jokić (yellow card) 44'; Sosnovski (yellow card) 90+2' | Summary | Glushakov (yellow card) 43'; Guilherme (yellow card) 44'; Ilič (yellow card) 56'; Ibričić 74'; Ignatyev 81' | Stadium: Trud Stadium; Attendance: 10,500; Referee: Mikhail Vilkov |

| 14 June 2011 13 | Lokomotiv Moscow | 3–1 | Spartak Nalchik | Moscow |
| 18:45 MSK (UTC+4) | Sychev 2'; Yanbayev (yellow card) 65'; Gatagov 89' (yellow card) 89'; Minchenkov 90+5' | Report | Siradze (yellow card) 11' (goal) 21'; Zahirović (yellow card) 41'; Goshokov (yellow card) 90+2' | Stadium: Lokomotiv Stadium; Attendance: 10,300; Referee: Vitaly Meshkov |

| 18 June 2011 14 | Lokomotiv Moscow | 0–2 | Spartak Moscow | Moscow |
| 21:00 MSK (UTC+4) | Ozdoyev (yellow card) 34'; Shishkin (yellow card) 39'; Guilherme (red card) 58' | Summary | Parshivlyuk (yellow card) 11'; Ananidze 44'; Rodri 45+2'; Dykan (yellow card) 66' | Stadium: Lokomotiv Stadium; Attendance: 26,077; Referee: Maksim Layushkin |

| 22 June 2011 15 | CSKA Moscow | 3–1 | Lokomotiv | Khimki |
| 20:00 MSK (UTC+4) | Doumbia 13', 58'; Love (yellow card) 29'; Tošić 65' | Summary | Maicon (yellow card) 28'; Ďurica 30'; Gatagov (yellow card) 81' | Stadium: Arena Khimki; Attendance: 16,000; Referee: Yuri Baskakov |

| 26 June 2011 16 | Dynamo Moscow | 4–1 | Lokomotiv Moscow | Khimki |
| 21:00 MSK (UTC+4) | Kurányi 10', 25'; Kokorin (yellow card) 19' (yellow-red card) 26'; Semshov 37'; Ropotan (yellow card) 65'; Wilkshire (yellow card) 74'; Voronin 79' | Report | Ignatyev (yellow card) 34'; Ďurica (yellow card) 58' (yellow-red card) 64'; Loskov 67' | Stadium: Arena Khimki; Attendance: 11,995; Referee: Almir Kayumov |

| 24 July 2011 17 | Lokomotiv Moscow | 4–0 | Amkar Perm | Moscow |
| 18:45 MSK (UTC+4) | Loskov 32'; Glushakov 40'; Sychev 48'; Ozdoyev (yellow card) 76'; Minchenkov 79' | Report | Fedoriv (yellow card) 61'; Mikhalyov (yellow card) 85'; Sekretov (yellow card) 88' | Stadium: Lokomotiv Stadium; Attendance: 11,055; Referee: Stanislav Sukhina |

| 31 July 2011 18 | Rostov | 0–3 | Lokomotiv Moscow | Rostov |
| 21:00 MSK (UTC+4) | Khagush (yellow card) 14' (yellow-red card) 86'; Ivanov (yellow card) 52'; Okoronkwo (yellow card) 55' | Summary | Loskov 8'; Glushakov (yellow card) 11'; Ignatyev (yellow card) 43'; Sychev 56' (pen.); Tarasov 81' | Stadium: Olimp - 2 Attendance: 9,500; Referee: Aleksandr Egorov |

| 7 August 2011 19 | Lokomotiv Moscow | 0–0 | Krylia Sovetov | Moscow |
| 20:00 MSK (UTC+4) | | Report | Yakovlev (yellow card) 83'; Tsallagov (yellow card) 87' | Stadium: Lokomotiv Stadium; Attendance: 13,284; Referee: Mikhail Vilkov |

| 14 August 2011 20 | Volga | 0–0 | Lokomotiv Moscow | Nizhny Novgorod |
| 17:00 MSK (UTC+4) | Arziani (yellow card) 9'; Getigezhev (yellow card) 82'; Belozyorov (yellow card) 84' | Summary | Maicon (yellow card) 88' da Costa (yellow card) 90+1' | Stadium: Lokomotiv Stadium; Attendance: 8,000; Referee: Vladimir Kazmenko |

| 21 August 2011 21 | Lokomotiv Moscow | 1–0 | Krasnodar | Moscow |
| 20:45 MSK (UTC+4) | Burlak (yellow card) 25'; Glushakov 34' (yellow card) 56'; Ozdoyev (yellow card) 58'; Obinna (yellow card) 71'; Yanbayev (yellow card) 74' | Report | Amisulashvili (yellow card) 15' | Stadium: Lokomotiv Stadium; Attendance: 10,700; Referee: Igor Egorov |

| 28 August 2011 22 | Kuban Krasnodar | 0–1 | Lokomotiv Moscow | Krasnodar |
| 21:00 MSK (UTC+4) | Bendz (yellow card) 27'; Traoré (yellow card) 34'; Bucur (yellow card) 40'; Rogochiy (yellow card) 84'; Kubík (yellow card) 86'; Zhavnerchik (yellow card) 90+5' | Report | Caicedo (yellow card) 29' (goal) 36'; Ivanov (yellow card) 35'; Maicon (yellow card) 64'; Tarasov (yellow card) 68'; Sychev (yellow card) 90' | Stadium: Kuban Stadium; Attendance: 27,620; Referee: Stanislav Sukhina |

| 10 September 2011 23 | Lokomotiv Moscow | 4–2 | Zenit | Moscow |
| 16:30 MSK (UTC+4) | Caicedo (yellow card) 16', (goal) 62'; Yanbaev (yellow card) 18'; Shishkin (yellow card) 33'; Obinna 46'; Tarasov (yellow card) 53' da Costa 77', 88' | Report | Lazović 8'; Hubočan (yellow card) 14'; Fayzulin (yellow card) 20'; Bukharov 31'; Lombaerts (yellow card) 55' | Stadium: Lokomotiv Stadium; Attendance: 19,180; Referee: Aleksey Nikolaev |

| 18 September 2011 24 | Terek Grozny | 0–4 | Lokomotiv Moscow | Grozny |
| 19:30 MSK (UTC+4) | Georgiev (yellow card) 42'; Legear (yellow card) 57' | Report | Glushakov 22' (pen.), 44' (pen.) (yellow card) 28'; Caicedo 47'; Maicon 88' | Stadium: Akhmat-Arena; Attendance: 12,500; Referee: Stanislav Sukhina |

| 23 September 2011 25 | Lokomotiv Moscow | 1–1 | Rubin Kazan | Moscow |
| 18:30 MSK (UTC+4) | Zapater 77' | Summary | Bocchetti (yellow card) 43'; Karadeniz (yellow card) 43'; Kuzmin (yellow card) 46'; Dyadyun 52'; Valdez (yellow card) 58' | Stadium: Lokomotiv Stadium; Attendance: 14,059; Referee: Vitaly Meshkov |

| 2 October 2011 26 | Anzhi Makhachkala | 0–1 | Lokomotiv Moscow | Makhachkala |
| 19:15 MSK (UTC+4) | Gadzhibekov (yellow card) 45+1'; Eto'o (yellow card) 52'; Ahmedov (yellow card) 63'; Prudnikov (yellow card) 90+4' | Summary | Caicedo 5' (yellow card) 36'; Yanbayev (yellow card) 58'; Glushakov (yellow card) 88' | Stadium: Dynamo Stadium; Attendance: 15,000; Referee: Mikhail Vilkov |

| 15 October 2011 27 | Lokomotiv Moscow | 3–0 | Tom Tomsk | Moscow |
| 19:15 MSK (UTC+4) | Ibričić 20' (pen.); Glushakov 56'; Sychev 63' (yellow card) 69' da Costa (yellow card) 68' | Summary | Dănănae (yellow card) 6' (yellow-red card) 19'; Sabitov (yellow card) 35'; Gultyayev (yellow card) 44' | Stadium: Lokomotiv Stadium; Attendance: 10,905; Referee: Aleksandr Egorov |

| 24 October 2011 28 | Spartak Nalchik | 1–2 | Lokomotiv Moscow | Nalchik |
| 16:00 MSK (UTC+4) | Gridnev 35'; Kontsedalov (yellow card) 38'; Aravin (yellow card) 83' | Report | Burlak (yellow card) 18' da Costa (yellow card) 23'; Maicon (yellow card) 44'; Obinna (yellow card) 48'; Glushakov 63'; Ďurica 87' | Stadium: Spartak Stadium; Attendance: 6,000; Referee: Vladislav Bezborodov |

| 27 October 2011 29 | Spartak Moscow | 3–0 | Lokomotiv Moscow | Moscow |
| 19:30 MSK (UTC+4) | Emenike 2', 15', 51'; Pareja (yellow card) 19'; Parshivlyuk (yellow card) 34'; Carioca (yellow card) 69'; Kombarov (yellow card) 90+2' | Summary | Glushakov (yellow card) 28'; Zapater (yellow card) 42'; Torbinski (yellow card) 69'; Obinna (yellow card) 81' (yellow-red card) 82' | Stadium: Luzhniki Stadium; Attendance: 40,000; Referee: Aleksei Eskov |

| 5 November 2011 30 | Lokomotiv Moscow | 1–1 | CSKA Moscow | Moscow |
| 20:45 MSK (UTC+4) | Ignatyev 11'; Ibričić (yellow card) 45+3'; Shishkin (yellow card) 90+1' | Summary | Nababkin (yellow card) 45+3'; Doumbia 64'; Dzagoev (yellow card) 90+2' | Stadium: Lokomotiv Stadium; Attendance: 21,698; Referee: Sergey Karasev |

==== Table ====
| Pos | Team | Pld | W | D | L | GF | GA | GD | Pts | Qualification |
|---|---|---|---|---|---|---|---|---|---|---|
| 3 | Dynamo Moscow | 30 | 16 | 7 | 7 | 51 | 30 | +21 | 55 | Qualification to Championship group |
| 4 | Spartak Moscow | 30 | 15 | 8 | 7 | 48 | 33 | +15 | 53 (Note: Spartak Moscow ahead of Lokomotiv Moscow on head-to-head points; Lokomotiv Moscow–Spartak Moscow 0–2, Spartak Moscow–Lokomotiv Moscow 3–0.) | Qualification to Championship group |
| 5 | Lokomotiv Moscow | 30 | 15 | 8 | 7 | 49 | 30 | +19 | 53 | Qualification to Championship group |
| 6 | Kuban Krasnodar | 30 | 14 | 7 | 9 | 38 | 27 | +11 | 49 | Qualification to Championship group |
| 7 | Rubin Kazan | 30 | 13 | 10 | 7 | 40 | 27 | +13 | 49 | Qualification to Championship group |

Source: Russian Premier League
Rules for classification: 1) points; 2) number of wins; 3) head-to-head points; 4) number of head-to-head wins; 5) head-to-head goal difference; 6) number of head-to-head goals scored; 7) number of head-to-head away goals scored; 8) goal difference; 9) number of goals scored; 10) number of away goals scored.

=== Russian Premier League – Championship group ===
==== Matches ====
| 20 November 2011 31 | Spartak Moscow | 2–0 | Lokomotiv Moscow | Moscow |
| 12:15 MSK (UTC+4) | Emenike 26', 44'; McGeady (yellow card) 32'; Suchý (yellow card) 54'; K. Kombarov (yellow card) 65'; D. Kombarov (yellow card) 82' | Report | Glushakov (yellow card) 34' | Stadium: Luzhniki Stadium; Attendance: 19,244; Referee: Maxim Layushkin |

| 27 November 2011 32 | Zenit St.Petersburg | 2–1 | Lokomotiv Moscow | Saint Petersburg |
| 16:30 MSK (UTC+4) | Danny 26'; Criscito (yellow card) 28'; Semak 31'; Lazović (yellow card) 62'; Shirokov (yellow card) 77'; Anyukov (yellow card) 84' | Report | Maicon (yellow card) 24'; Glushakov 39' (yellow card) 75'; Yanbayev (yellow card) 60'; Shishkin (yellow card) 78'; Guilherme (yellow card) 90+3' da Costa (yellow card) 90+4' | Stadium: Petrovsky Stadium; Attendance: 16,100; Referee: Mikhail Vilkov |

| 3 March 2012 33 | Lokomotiv Moscow | 2–0 | Kuban Krasnodar | Moscow |
| 18:30 MSK (UTC+4) | Maicon 5'; Torbinski (yellow card) 42'; Caicedo 44'; Ibričić (yellow card) 85' | Summary | Ureña (yellow card) 43'; Bucur (yellow card) 68' | Stadium: Lokomotiv Stadium; Attendance: 9,016; Referee: Vladislav Bezborodov |

| 11 March 2012 34 | Rubin Kazan | 0–0 | Lokomotiv Moscow | Kazan |
| 16:00 MSK (UTC+4) | Natcho (yellow card) 11'; Kaleshin (yellow card) 51'; Kislyak (yellow card) 90+1' | Summary | Tarasov (yellow card) 33'; Belyayev (yellow card) 40' | Stadium: Central Stadium; Attendance: 7,280; Referee: Eduard Malyi |

| 17 March 2012 35 | Lokomotiv Moscow | 1–0 | Anzhi Makhachkala | Moscow |
| 16:30 MSK (UTC+4) | Glushakov 73' da Costa (yellow card) 82'; Shishkin (yellow card) 90+1' | Summary | Shatov (yellow card) 30'; Akhmedov (yellow card) 68'; Eto'o (yellow card) 83' | Stadium: Lokomotiv Stadium; Attendance: 14,120; Referee: Maxim Layushkin |

| 24 March 2012 36 | CSKA Moscow | 0–2 | Lokomotiv Moscow | Moscow |
| 16:15 MSK (UTC+4) | | Summary | Pavlyuchenko 10'; Caicedo 34'; Yeshchenko (yellow card) 62'; Ďurica (yellow card) 90+2' | Stadium: Luzhniki Stadium; Attendance: 15,103; Referee: Aleksey Eskov |

| 1 April 2012 37 | Lokomotiv Moscow | 0–2 | Dynamo Moscow | Moscow |
| 18:30 MSK (UTC+4) | Pavlyuchenko (yellow card) 84'; Burlak (yellow card) 84'; Ozdoyev (yellow card) 87' | Summary | Wilkshire (yellow card) 41'; Kokorin 43'; Rykov (yellow card) 48'; Misimović 88' (pen.) | Stadium: Lokomotiv Stadium; Attendance: 15,640; Referee: Alexey Nikolaev |

| 7 April 2012 38 | Lokomotiv Moscow | 0–1 | Zenit St.Petersburg | Moscow |
| 16:15 MSK (UTC+4) | | Summary | Shirokov 75'; Malafeev (yellow card) 89' | Stadium: Lokomotiv Stadium; Attendance: 15,814; Referee: Eduard Malyi |

| 14 April 2012 39 | Kuban Krasnodar | 1–1 | Lokomotiv Moscow | Krasnodar |
| 16:15 MSK (UTC+4) | Zelão (yellow card) 44'; Lolo (yellow card) 65'; Pizzelli 74'; Bucur (yellow card) 90' | Summary | Pavlyuchenko (yellow card) 44' (goal) 62' | Stadium: Kuban Stadium; Attendance: 18,553; Referee: Stanislav Sukhina |

| 22 April 2012 40 | Lokomotiv Moscow | 0–0 | Rubin Kazan | Moscow |
| 19:30 MSK (UTC+4) | Zapater (yellow card) 20'; Podberezkin (yellow card) 36' | Summary | Sharonov (yellow card) 4'; Dyadyun (yellow card) 57'; Kuzmin (yellow card) 64'; Ryazantsev (yellow card) 78' | Stadium: Lokomotiv Stadium; Attendance: 12,556; Referee: Mikhail Vilkov |

| 28 April 2012 41 | Anzhi Makhachkala | 3–1 | Lokomotiv Moscow | Makhachkala |
| 15:45 MSK (UTC+4) | Burlak 25' (o.g.); Gadzhibekov (yellow card) 36'; Eto'o 64', 90+1' | Summary | Glushakov 31' (yellow card) 34'; Belyayev (yellow card) 47'; Ozdoyev (yellow card) 56' | Stadium: Dynamo Stadium; Attendance: 14,800; Referee: Vladimir Kazmenko |

| 2 May 2012 42 | Lokomotiv Moscow | 0–3 | CSKA Moscow | Moscow |
| 20:45 MSK (UTC+4) | da Costa (red card) 7'; Glushakov (yellow card) 32'; Shishkin (yellow card) 87' | Summary | Doumbia 8'; Honda (yellow card) 25'; Nababkin (yellow card) 40'; Tošić 78', 88'; Wernbloom (yellow card) 84' | Stadium: Lokomotiv Stadium; Attendance: 14,087; Referee: Vitaly Meshkov |

| 6 May 2012 43 | Dynamo Moscow | 2–2 | Lokomotiv Moscow | Khimki |
| 14:00 MSK (UTC+4) | Rykov (yellow card) 43'; Kurányi 47'; Fernández (yellow card) 57'; Sapeta (yellow card) 82'; Misimović 90+2' | Summary | Belyayev 27' (yellow card) 78'; Zapater (yellow card) 32'; Yeshchenko (yellow card) 48'; Ozdoyev (yellow card) 52'; Glushakov 82' | Stadium: Arena Khimki; Attendance: 10,193; Referee: Alexey Nikolaev |

| 13 May 2012 44 | Lokomotiv Moscow | 0–2 | Spartak Moscow | Moscow |
| 18:30 MSK (UTC+4) | Ignatyev (yellow card) 58'; Torbinski (yellow card) 66' | Summary | Suchý 23'; Dzyuba 40'; Carioca (yellow card) 51'; McGeady (yellow card) 78'; Rojo (yellow card) 83'; K.Kombarov (yellow card) 85' | Stadium: Lokomotiv Stadium; Attendance: 26,244; Referee: Sergey Karasev |

==== League table ====
| Pos | Team | Pld | W | D | L | GF | GA | GD | Pts | Qualification |
|---|---|---|---|---|---|---|---|---|---|---|
| 1 | Zenit St. Petersburg (C) | 44 | 24 | 16 | 4 | 85 | 40 | +45 | 88 | Qualification to Champions League group stage |
| 2 | Spartak Moscow | 44 | 21 | 12 | 11 | 69 | 47 | +22 | 75 | Qualification to Champions League play-off round |
| 3 | CSKA Moscow | 44 | 19 | 16 | 9 | 72 | 47 | +25 | 73 | Qualification to Europa League play-off round |
| 4 | Dynamo Moscow | 44 | 20 | 12 | 12 | 66 | 50 | +16 | 72 | Qualification to Europa League third qualifying round |
| 5 | Anzhi Makhachkala | 44 | 19 | 13 | 12 | 54 | 42 | +12 | 70 | Qualification to Europa League second qualifying round |
| 6 | Rubin Kazan | 44 | 17 | 17 | 10 | 55 | 41 | +14 | 68 | Qualification to Europa League group stage (Note: Rubin have won the 2011–12 Russian Cup and thus have qualified for the group stage of the 2012–13 UEFA Europa League.) |
| 7 | Lokomotiv Moscow | 44 | 18 | 12 | 14 | 59 | 48 | +11 | 66 | |
| 8 | Kuban Krasnodar | 44 | 15 | 16 | 13 | 50 | 45 | +5 | 61 | |

Source: Russian Premier League
Rules for classification: 1) points; 2) number of wins; 3) head-to-head points; 4) number of head-to-head wins; 5) head-to-head goal difference; 6) number of head-to-head goals scored; 7) number of head-to-head away goals scored; 8) goal difference; 9) number of goals scored; 10) number of away goals scored
(C) Champions

=== Russian Cup ===
| 17 July 2011 Round of 32 | Yenisey Krasnoyarsk | 0–2 | Lokomotiv Moscow | Krasnoyarsk |
| 13:00 MSK (UTC+4) | Leshonok (yellow card) 62' | Report | Ignatyev 3'; Maicon 14'; Burlak (yellow card) 30' | Stadium: Central Stadium; Attendance: 16,000; Referee: Vasili Miroshnichenko |

| 21 September 2011 Round of 16 | Lokomotiv Moscow | 1–0 | Luch-Energiya Vladivostok | Moscow |
| 19:30 MSK (UTC+4) | A. Ivanov 60' (pen.) | Report | Kristić (yellow card) 18'; Krendelew (yellow card) 64'; Fyodorov (yellow card) 77' | Stadium: Lokomotiv Stadium; Attendance: 10,082; Referee: Aleksei Reznikov |

| 21 March 2012 Quarterfinals | Rubin Kazan | 4–0 | Lokomotiv Moscow | Grozny^{1} |
| 18:30 MSK (UTC+4) | Karadeniz 30', 70' (yellow card) 72'; Ryazantsev 49'; Davydov 81'; Jonatan (yellow card) 90' | Summary | Torbinski (yellow card) 34'; Caicedo (yellow card) 37'; Ozdoyev (yellow card) 56' | Stadium: Akhmat-Arena; Attendance: 13,400; Referee: Vitali Meshkov |

=== Europa League ===
==== Play-off ====
| 18 August 2011 1st Leg | Lokomotiv Moscow (Russia) | 2–0 | (Slovakia) Spartak Trnava | Moscow, Russia |
| 20:00 MSK (UTC+4) | Yanbayev 34'; Maicon 37'; Tarasov (yellow card) 73' | Report | Procházka (yellow card) 12' | Stadium: Lokomotiv Stadium; Attendance: 13,402; Referee: Alexandru Deaconu (Romania) |

| 25 August 2011 2nd Leg | Spartak Trnava (Slovakia) | 1–1 (1–3 agg.) | (Russia) Lokomotiv Moscow | Trnava, Slovakia |
| 21:00 MSK (UTC+4) | Kaščák (yellow card) 30'; Yanbaev 38' (o.g.); Vyskočil (yellow card) 47'; Bicák (yellow card) 61'; Raška (red card) 76'; Čarnota (yellow card) 82' (yellow-red card) 90'; Tomaček (yellow card) 85'; Karhan (yellow card) 90'; Malcharek (red card) 90+1'; Koné (yellow card) 90+5' | Report | Tarasov (yellow card) 13'; Ďurica (yellow card) 33'; Glushakov (yellow card) 65'; Obinna 81' (pen.) | Stadium: Štadión Antona Malatinského; Attendance: 11,258; Referee: Luca Banti (Italy) |

==== Group stage ====
| Pos | Team | Pld | W | D | L | GF | GA | GD | Pts | Qualification |
|---|---|---|---|---|---|---|---|---|---|---|
| 1 | (Belgium) Anderlecht | 6 | 6 | 0 | 0 | 18 | 5 | +13 | 18 | Advance to knockout phase |
| 2 | (Russia) Lokomotiv Moscow | 6 | 4 | 0 | 2 | 14 | 11 | +3 | 12 | Advance to knockout phase |
| 3 | (Greece) AEK Athens | 6 | 1 | 0 | 5 | 8 | 15 | −7 | 3 (Note: Tied on head-to-head points (3). Head-to-head goal difference: AEK Athens +1, Sturm Graz −1.) | |
| 4 | (Austria) Sturm Graz | 6 | 1 | 0 | 5 | 5 | 14 | −9 | 3 | |

Source: Soccerway
Notes:

| 15 September 2011 1 | Sturm Graz (Austria) | 1–2 | (Russia) Lokomotiv Moscow | Graz, Austria |
| 23:05 MSK (UTC+4) | Szabics 14'; Standfest (yellow card) 74'; Popkhadze (yellow card) 88' | Report | Ibričić (yellow card) 19'; Obinna 28'; Sychev 29'; Maicon (yellow card) 76' | Stadium: UPC-Arena; Attendance: 13,356; Referee: Bruno Paixão (Portugal) |

| 29 September 2011 2 | Lokomotiv Moscow (Russia) | 0–2 | (Belgium) Anderlecht | Moscow, Russia |
| 20:00 MSK (UTC+4) | Obinna (yellow card) 47'; Shishkin (yellow card) 62' | Report | Suárez 11'; Wasilewski (yellow card) 45'; Mbokani 71'; Kanu (yellow card) 90' | Stadium: Lokomotiv Stadium; Attendance: 11,485; Referee: Matej Jug (Slovenia) |

| 20 October 2011 3 | Lokomotiv Moscow (Russia) | 3–1 | (Greece) AEK Athens | Moscow, Russia |
| 20:00 MSK (UTC+4) | Sychev 47', 71' (pen.); Ibričić (yellow card) 62' da Costa (yellow card) 75'; Caicedo 90+3' | Report | José Carlos (yellow card) 67'; Sialmas 89' | Stadium: Lokomotiv Stadium; Attendance: 8,279; Referee: Pol van Boekel (Netherlands) |

| 4 November 2011 4 | AEK Athens (Greece) | 1–3 | (Russia) Lokomotiv Moscow | Athens, Greece |
| 00:05 MSK (UTC+4) | Makos (yellow card) 36'; Leonardo 61' (pen.) | Report | Glushakov 50'; Shishkin (yellow card) 59'; Maicon 72'; Ignatyev 80' | Stadium: Olympic Stadium; Attendance: 4,042; Referee: William Collum (Scotland) |

| 1 December 2011 5 | Lokomotiv Moscow (Russia) | 3–1 | (Austria) Sturm Graz | Moscow, Russia |
| 21:00 MSK (UTC+4) | da Costa (yellow card) 39'; Ibričić (yellow card) 55'; Glushakov (yellow card) 59' (goal) 89'; Maicon 62'; Sychev 72' (pen.); Shishkin (yellow card) 82' | Report | Popkhadze (yellow card) 45+2'; Kainz 63'; Ehrenreich (yellow card) 73'; Weber (yellow card) 84' | Stadium: Lokomotiv Stadium; Attendance: 12,423; Referee: Deniz Aytekin (Germany) |

| 15 December 2011 6 | Anderlecht (Belgium) | 5–3 | (Russia) Lokomotiv Moscow | Brussels, Belgium |
| 00:05 MSK (UTC+4) | Fernando (yellow card) 11' (goal) 39'; Kouyaté (yellow card) 27'; Kljestan 33'; Wasilewski 57'; Suárez 61'; Juhász (yellow card) 76'; Gillet 78' | Report | Ignatyev 21' da Costa (yellow card) 24'; Maicon (yellow card) 37'; Ivanov (yellow card) 45+2' (yellow-red card) 83'; Sychev 69' (pen.), 89' | Stadium: Constant Vanden Stock Stadium; Attendance: 14,069; Referee: Ivan Bebek (Croatia) |

Lokomotiv progressed to the knock-out stage.

==== Knock-out stage ====
| 16 February 2012 Round of 32 1st leg | Lokomotiv Moscow (Russia) | 2–1 | (Spain) Athletic Bilbao | Moscow, Russia |
| 21:00 MSK (UTC+4) | Maicon (yellow card) 9'; Torbinski (yellow card) 45+1'; Glushakov 61' (pen.); Caicedo 71'; Guilherme (yellow card) 90' | Report | Muniain 35'; Aurtenetxe (yellow card) 61' | Stadium: Luzhniki Stadium^{2} Attendance: 13,160; Referee: Ovidiu Alin Hațegan (Romania) |

| 23 February 2012 Round of 32 2nd leg | Athletic Bilbao (Spain) | 1–0 (a2–2 agg.) | (Russia) Lokomotiv Moscow | Bilbao, Spain |
| 19:00 | Iturraspe (yellow card) 28'; Amorebieta (yellow card) 54' (yellow-red card) 60'; Muniain 62'; Martínez (yellow card) 89' | Report | Zapater (yellow card) 30'; Caicedo (yellow card) 54'; Tarasov (yellow card) 61'; Obinna (yellow card) 89' | Stadium: San Mamés Stadium; Attendance: 35,000; Referee: Pawel Gil (Poland) |

== Squad statistics ==
=== Appearances and goals ===
| No. | Pos | Nat | Player | Total | | Premier League | | Russian Cup | | Europa League | |
| No. | Pos | Nat | Player | Apps | Goals | Apps | Goals | Apps | Goals | Apps | Goals |
|---|---|---|---|---|---|---|---|---|---|---|---|
| 1 | GK | (Brazil) BRA | Guilherme | 50 | 0 | 40+0 | 0 | 2+0 | 0 | 8+0 | 0 |
| 4 | MF | (Spain) ESP | Alberto Zapater | 32 | 1 | 16+5 | 1 | 1+1 | 0 | 7+2 | 0 |
| 5 | DF | (Russia) RUS | Taras Burlak | 44 | 1 | 32+3 | 1 | 3+0 | 0 | 6+0 | 0 |
| 6 | MF | (Russia) RUS | Maksim Grigoryev | 3 | 0 | 1+2 | 0 | 0+0 | 0 | 0+0 | 0 |
| 7 | MF | (Russia) RUS | Dmitri Tarasov | 14 | 1 | 5+4 | 1 | 1+0 | 0 | 4+0 | 0 |
| 8 | MF | (Russia) RUS | Denis Glushakov | 50 | 14 | 36+1 | 11 | 3+0 | 0 | 10+0 | 3 |
| 9 | MF | (Bosnia and Herzegovina) BIH | Senijad Ibričić | 26 | 4 | 10+8 | 4 | 0+2 | 0 | 5+1 | 0 |
| 10 | MF | (Russia) RUS | Dmitri Loskov | 35 | 3 | 19+11 | 3 | 2+0 | 0 | 1+2 | 0 |
| 11 | FW | (Russia) RUS | Dmitri Sychev | 53 | 12 | 22+18 | 6 | 2+1 | 0 | 6+4 | 6 |
| 13 | FW | (Nigeria) NGR | Victor Obinna | 26 | 3 | 10+6 | 1 | 1+1 | 0 | 4+4 | 2 |
| 15 | FW | (Russia) RUS | Roman Pavlyuchenko | 10 | 2 | 8+1 | 2 | 1+0 | 0 | 0+0 | 0 |
| 16 | GK | (Belarus) BLR | Anton Amelchenko | 2 | 0 | 0+0 | 0 | 0+0 | 0 | 2+0 | 0 |
| 18 | MF | (Russia) RUS | Vladislav Ignatyev | 47 | 7 | 29+7 | 4 | 2+1 | 1 | 5+3 | 2 |
| 20 | DF | (Slovenia) SLO | Branko Ilič | 34 | 0 | 24+7 | 0 | 1+0 | 0 | 2+0 | 0 |
| 21 | MF | (Russia) RUS | Dmitri Torbinski | 41 | 1 | 27+7 | 1 | 1+1 | 0 | 5+0 | 0 |
| 22 | DF | (Portugal) POR | Manuel da Costa | 23 | 2 | 15+0 | 2 | 1+0 | 0 | 6+1 | 0 |
| 24 | DF | (Russia) RUS | Andrei Ivanov | 4 | 1 | 2+0 | 0 | 1+0 | 1 | 1+0 | 0 |
| 25 | FW | (Ecuador) ECU | Felipe Caicedo | 25 | 8 | 14+3 | 6 | 1+0 | 0 | 2+5 | 2 |
| 27 | MF | (Russia) RUS | Magomed Ozdoyev | 39 | 1 | 26+4 | 1 | 2+0 | 0 | 3+4 | 0 |
| 28 | DF | (Slovakia) SVK | Ján Ďurica | 34 | 3 | 24+3 | 3 | 1+0 | 0 | 6+0 | 0 |
| 35 | GK | (Russia) RUS | Aleksandr Filtsov | 7 | 0 | 3+3 | 0 | 1+0 | 0 | 0+0 | 0 |
| 45 | FW | (Russia) RUS | Alexander Minchenkov | 9 | 2 | 1+6 | 2 | 0+0 | 0 | 1+1 | 0 |
| 49 | DF | (Russia) RUS | Roman Shishkin | 53 | 3 | 41+0 | 3 | 3+0 | 0 | 9+0 | 0 |
| 50 | DF | (Russia) RUS | Andrey Eshchenko | 7 | 0 | 7+0 | 0 | 0+0 | 0 | 0+0 | 0 |
| 51 | DF | (Russia) RUS | Maksim Belyayev | 13 | 1 | 11+0 | 1 | 0+0 | 0 | 2+0 | 0 |
| 55 | MF | (Russia) RUS | Renat Yanbayev | 45 | 1 | 35+0 | 0 | 2+0 | 0 | 8+0 | 1 |
| 56 | FW | (Russia) RUS | Georgi Nurov | 2 | 0 | 0+1 | 0 | 0+0 | 0 | 0+1 | 0 |
| 65 | MF | (Russia) RUS | Vyacheslav Podberezkin | 1 | 0 | 1+0 | 0 | 0+0 | 0 | 0+0 | 0 |
| 77 | MF | (Moldova) MDA | Stanislav Ivanov | 10 | 0 | 4+5 | 0 | 0+1 | 0 | 0+0 | 0 |
| 90 | MF | (Brazil) BRA | Maicon | 48 | 8 | 33+4 | 4 | 1+1 | 1 | 7+2 | 3 |
Players who left Lokomotiv on loan:
| 33 | GK | (Belarus) BLR | Artem Gomelko | 1 | 0 | 1+0 | 0 | 0+0 | 0 | 0+0 | 0 |
| 99 | MF | (Russia) RUS | Alan Gatagov | 9 | 2 | 1+8 | 2 | 0+0 | 0 | 0+0 | 0 |
Players who appeared for Lokomotiv who left during the season:
| 19 | FW | (Senegal) SEN | Baye Djiby Fall | 4 | 0 | 1+3 | 0 | 0+0 | 0 | 0+0 | 0 |
| 23 | DF | (Montenegro) MNE | Marko Baša | 4 | 0 | 3+1 | 0 | 0+0 | 0 | 0+0 | 0 |

=== Top scorers ===
| Place | Position | Nation | Number | Name | Premier League | Russian Cup | Europa League | Total |
|---|---|---|---|---|---|---|---|---|
| 1 | MF | (Russia) | 8 | Denis Glushakov | 11 | 0 | 3 | 14 |
| 2 | FW | (Russia) | 11 | Dmitri Sychev | 6 | 0 | 6 | 12 |
| 3 | FW | (Ecuador) | 25 | Felipe Caicedo | 6 | 0 | 2 | 8 |
| 3 | MF | (Brazil) | 90 | Maicon | 4 | 1 | 3 | 8 |
| 5 | MF | (Russia) | 18 | Vladislav Ignatyev | 4 | 1 | 2 | 7 |
| 6 | MF | (Bosnia and Herzegovina) | 9 | Senijad Ibričić | 4 | 0 | 0 | 4 |
| 7 | MF | (Russia) | 10 | Dmitri Loskov | 3 | 0 | 0 | 3 |
| 7 | DF | (Slovakia) | 28 | Ján Ďurica | 3 | 0 | 0 | 3 |
| 7 | DF | (Russia) | 49 | Roman Shishkin | 3 | 0 | 0 | 3 |
| 7 | FW | (Nigeria) | 13 | Victor Obinna | 1 | 0 | 2 | 3 |
| 11 | FW | (Russia) | 15 | Roman Pavlyuchenko | 2 | 0 | 0 | 2 |
| 11 | DF | (Portugal) | 22 | Manuel da Costa | 2 | 0 | 0 | 2 |
| 11 | FW | (Russia) | 45 | Alexander Minchenkov | 2 | 0 | 0 | 2 |
| 11 | MF | (Russia) | 99 | Alan Gatagov | 2 | 0 | 0 | 2 |
| 15 | DF | (Russia) | 51 | Maksim Belyayev | 1 | 0 | 0 | 1 |
| 15 | MF | (Spain) | 4 | Alberto Zapater | 1 | 0 | 0 | 1 |
| 15 | DF | (Russia) | 5 | Taras Burlak | 1 | 0 | 0 | 1 |
| 15 | MF | (Russia) | 7 | Dmitri Tarasov | 1 | 0 | 0 | 1 |
| 15 | MF | (Russia) | 21 | Dmitri Torbinski | 1 | 0 | 0 | 1 |
| 15 | MF | (Russia) | 27 | Magomed Ozdoyev | 1 | 0 | 0 | 1 |
| 15 | DF | (Russia) | 24 | Andrei Ivanov | 0 | 1 | 0 | 1 |
| 15 | DF | (Russia) | 55 | Renat Yanbayev | 0 | 0 | 1 | 1 |
| | | | | TOTALS | 59 | 3 | 19 | 81 |

=== Disciplinary record ===
| Number | Nation | Position | Name | Russian Premier League | | Russian Cup | | Europa League | | Total | |
| Number | Nation | Position | Name | Yellow card | Red card | Yellow card | Red card | Yellow card | Red card | Yellow card | Red card |
| 1 | (Brazil) | GK | Guilherme | 3 | 1 | 0 | 0 | 1 | 0 | 4 | 1 |
| 4 | (Spain) | MF | Alberto Zapater | 3 | 0 | 0 | 0 | 1 | 0 | 4 | 0 |
| 5 | (Russia) | DF | Taras Burlak | 5 | 0 | 1 | 0 | 0 | 0 | 6 | 0 |
| 7 | (Russia) | MF | Dmitri Tarasov | 3 | 0 | 0 | 0 | 3 | 0 | 6 | 0 |
| 8 | (Russia) | MF | Denis Glushakov | 10 | 0 | 0 | 0 | 2 | 0 | 12 | 0 |
| 9 | (Bosnia and Herzegovina) | MF | Senijad Ibričić | 4 | 0 | 0 | 0 | 3 | 0 | 7 | 0 |
| 10 | (Russia) | MF | Dmitri Loskov | 4 | 0 | 0 | 0 | 0 | 0 | 4 | 0 |
| 11 | (Russia) | FW | Dmitri Sychev | 2 | 0 | 0 | 0 | 0 | 0 | 2 | 0 |
| 13 | (Nigeria) | FW | Victor Obinna | 4 | 1 | 0 | 0 | 2 | 0 | 6 | 1 |
| 15 | (Russia) | FW | Roman Pavlyuchenko | 2 | 0 | 0 | 0 | 0 | 0 | 2 | 0 |
| 18 | (Russia) | MF | Vladislav Ignatyev | 3 | 0 | 0 | 0 | 0 | 0 | 3 | 0 |
| 20 | (Slovenia) | DF | Branko Ilič | 1 | 0 | 0 | 0 | 0 | 0 | 1 | 0 |
| 21 | (Russia) | MF | Dmitri Torbinski | 4 | 0 | 1 | 0 | 1 | 0 | 6 | 0 |
| 22 | (Portugal) | DF | Manuel da Costa | 5 | 1 | 0 | 0 | 3 | 0 | 8 | 1 |
| 24 | (Russia) | DF | Andrei Ivanov | 1 | 0 | 0 | 0 | 2 | 1 | 3 | 1 |
| 25 | (Ecuador) | FW | Felipe Caicedo | 4 | 0 | 1 | 0 | 1 | 0 | 6 | 0 |
| 27 | (Russia) | MF | Magomed Ozdoyev | 7 | 0 | 1 | 0 | 1 | 0 | 9 | 0 |
| 28 | (Slovakia) | DF | Ján Ďurica | 6 | 1 | 0 | 0 | 1 | 0 | 7 | 1 |
| 49 | (Russia) | DF | Roman Shishkin | 7 | 0 | 0 | 0 | 3 | 0 | 10 | 0 |
| 50 | (Russia) | DF | Andrey Eshchenko | 2 | 0 | 0 | 0 | 0 | 0 | 2 | 0 |
| 51 | (Russia) | DF | Maksim Belyayev | 3 | 0 | 0 | 0 | 0 | 0 | 3 | 0 |
| 55 | (Russia) | MF | Renat Yanbayev | 7 | 0 | 0 | 0 | 0 | 0 | 7 | 0 |
| 65 | (Russia) | MF | Vyacheslav Podberezkin | 1 | 0 | 0 | 0 | 0 | 0 | 1 | 0 |
| 77 | (Moldova) | MF | Stanislav Ivanov | 2 | 0 | 0 | 0 | 0 | 0 | 2 | 0 |
| 90 | (Brazil) | MF | Maicon | 6 | 0 | 0 | 0 | 3 | 0 | 9 | 0 |
| 99 | (Russia) | MF | Alan Gatagov | 3 | 0 | 0 | 0 | 0 | 0 | 3 | 0 |
| | | | TOTALS | 102 | 3 | 4 | 0 | 27 | 1 | 133 | 4 |

== Notes ==
- Note 1: Rubin played their home game in Grozny due to bad pitch conditions in Kazan.
