= 2012–13 FC Lokomotiv Moscow season =

Lokomotiv Moscow
RFPL 2012–13 season
- Chairman: Olga Smorodskaya
- Manager: Slaven Bilić
- Stadium: Lokomotiv (capacity 28,800)
- Russian Premier League: 9th
- Russian Cup: Round of 16 vs Terek
- Top goalscorer: League: Dame N'Doye (10); All: Dame N'Doye (10)
- Highest home attendance: 27,269 vs Spartak; League, 2 September 2012
- Lowest home attendance: 8,214 vs Volga N.N. League, 8 December 2012
- Average home league attendance: 12,862
Home colours	Away colours	Third colours

The 2012–13 Lokomotiv Moscow season involved the club competing in the Russian Premier League and Russian Cup. It was Slaven Bilić's first season as manager and ended with the worst league result of the team (9th, the lower part of the table) since establishing of Russian Championship in 1992. As a result, the contract of Bilić was terminated by mutual agreement on 17 June 2013.

== First team squad ==
No.	Name	Nationality	Position(s)	Date of birth (age)	Signed from	Since
Goalkeepers
1	Guilherme	(Brazil)	GK	12 December 1985 (age 40)	Atlético Paranaense	2007
22	Dario Krešić	(Croatia)	GK	11 January 1984 (age 42)	PAOK	2012
41	Miroslav Lobantsev	(Russia)	GK	27 May 1995 (age 31)	Youth system	2012
Defenders
5	Taras Burlak	(Russia)	DF	22 February 1990 (age 36)	Youth system	2008
14	Vedran Ćorluka	(Croatia)	DF	5 February 1986 (age 40)	Tottenham Hotspur	2012
28	Ján Ďurica	(Slovakia)	DF	10 December 1981 (age 44)	Saturn Moscow Oblast	2009
29	Vitaliy Denisov	(Uzbekistan)	DF	23 February 1987 (age 39)	Dnipro Dnipropetrovsk	2013
49	Roman Shishkin	(Russia)	DF	27 January 1987 (age 39)	Spartak Moscow	2010
55	Renat Yanbayev	(Russia)	DF	7 April 1984 (age 42)	Kuban Krasnodar	2007
79	Vitali Lystsov	(Russia)	DF	11 July 1995 (age 31)	Youth system	2012
Midfielders
4	Alberto Zapater	(Spain)	MF	13 June 1985 (age 41)	Sporting CP	2011
6	Maksim Grigoryev	(Russia)	MF	6 July 1990 (age 36)	MITOS Novocherkassk	2012
8	Denis Glushakov	(Russia)	MF	27 January 1987 (age 39)	Nika Moscow	2005
10	Dmitri Loskov	(Russia)	MF	12 February 1974 (age 52)	Saturn Moscow Oblast	2010
19	Aleksandr Samedov	(Russia)	MF	19 July 1984 (age 42)	Dynamo Moscow	2012
21	Dmitri Torbinski	(Russia)	MF	28 April 1984 (age 42)	Spartak Moscow	2008
23	Dmitri Tarasov	(Russia)	MF	18 March 1987 (age 39)	FC Moscow	2010
26	Yan Tigorev	(Belarus)	MF	10 March 1984 (age 42)	Tom Tomsk	2012
27	Magomed Ozdoyev	(Russia)	MF	5 November 1992 (age 34)	Dynamo Kyiv	2010
59	Aleksei Miranchuk	(Russia)	MF	17 October 1995 (age 31)	Youth system	2013
Forwards
13	Victor Obinna	(Nigeria)	FW	25 March 1987 (age 39)	Internazionale	2011
18	Roman Pavlyuchenko	(Russia)	FW	15 December 1981 (age 44)	Tottenham Hotspur	2012
25	Felipe Caicedo	(Ecuador)	FW	5 September 1988 (age 38)	Manchester City	2011
33	Dame N'Doye	(Senegal)	FW	21 February 1985 (age 41)	Copenhagen	2012
90	Maicon	(Brazil)	FW	18 February 1990 (age 36)	Fluminense	2010

== Transfers ==
In: Summer transfer window 2012
Note: Flags indicate national team as defined under FIFA eligibility rules; some limited exceptions apply. Players may hold more than one non-FIFA nationality.

No.	Pos.	Nation	Player
3	DF	SUI	Reto Ziegler (on loan from (Italy) Juventus)
14	DF	CRO	Vedran Ćorluka (from (England) Tottenham Hotspur)
19	MF	RUS	Aleksandr Samedov (from (Russia) Dynamo Moscow)
22	GK	CRO	Dario Krešić (from (Greece) PAOK)
33	FW	SEN	Dame N'Doye (from (Denmark) Copenhagen)
45	FW	RUS	Aleksandr Minchenkov (end of loan to (Russia) Mordovia Saransk)

In: Winter transfer window 2013
Note: Flags indicate national team as defined under FIFA eligibility rules; some limited exceptions apply. Players may hold more than one non-FIFA nationality.

No.	Pos.	Nation	Player
29	DF	UZB	Vitaliy Denisov (from (Ukraine) FC Dnipro Dnipropetrovsk)
55	DF	RUS	Renat Yanbayev (returned from loan to (Russia) Zenit Saint Petersburg)

Out: Summer transfer window 2012
Note: Flags indicate national team as defined under FIFA eligibility rules; some limited exceptions apply. Players may hold more than one non-FIFA nationality.

No.	Pos.	Nation	Player
9	MF	BIH	Senijad Ibričić (on loan to (Turkey) Gaziantepspor)
16	GK	BLR	Anton Amelchenko (on loan to (Russia) Terek Grozny)
18	MF	RUS	Vladislav Ignatyev (to (Russia) Krasnodar)
22	DF	POR	Manuel da Costa (on loan to (Portugal) Nacional)
29	DF	RUS	Igor Golban (on loan to (Czech Republic) Sigma Olomouc)
32	FW	RUS	Mikhail Petrusyov (on loan to (Russia) Dnepr Smolensk)
44	MF	RUS	Aleksei Gorshkov (to (Russia) Rus Saint Petersburg)
45	FW	RUS	Aleksandr Minchenkov (pause)
55	DF	RUS	Renat Yanbayev (on loan to (Russia) Zenit Saint Petersburg)
64	MF	RUS	Nikita Lapin (to (Russia) Zvezda Ryazan)
74	FW	RUS	Maksim Barsov (to (Russia) Volga Ulyanovsk)
77	MF	MDA	Stanislav Ivanov (to (Moldova) Sheriff Tiraspol)
82	MF	RUS	Igor Mendelev
89	DF	RUS	Nikita Samokhvalov
—	DF	RUS	Andrei Ivanov (on loan to (Russia) Rostov)
—	DF	RUS	Ruslan Nakhushev (to (Russia) Krasnodar)
—	MF	RUS	Semyon Fomin (on loan to (Russia) Rotor Volgograd)
—	FW	ARM	Artur Sarkisov (on loan to (Russia) Volga Nizhny Novgorod)

Out: Winter transfer window 2013
Note: Flags indicate national team as defined under FIFA eligibility rules; some limited exceptions apply. Players may hold more than one non-FIFA nationality.

No.	Pos.	Nation	Player
35	GK	RUS	Aleksandr Filtsov (loaned to (Russia) FC Krasnodar; on 8 May 2013 FC Krasnodar signed Filtsov on permanent basis using contract option to buy)
51	DF	RUS	Maksim Belyayev (loaned to (Russia) FC Rostov)
3	DF	SUI	Reto Ziegler (returned to (Italy) Juventus from loan)
50	DF	RUS	Andrey Yeshchenko (to (Russia) Anzhi)
57	DF	RUS	Georgi Burnash (to (Russia) Lokomotiv-2)
61	DF	RUS	Sergei Zuikov (to (Russia) Volgar)
11	FW	RUS	Dmitri Sychev (loaned to (Belarus) FC Dinamo Minsk)

== Competitions ==
=== Legend ===
Win Draw Loss Postponed

=== Russian Premier League ===
==== Results by matchday ====
Round	1	2	3	4	5	6	7	8	9	10	11	12	13	14	15	16	17	18	19	20	21	22	23	24	25	26	27	28	29	30
Ground	A	H	A	H	A	H	H	H	A	A	H	A	H	A	H	A	H	A	H	A	A	A	H	H	A	H	A	H	A	H
Result	W	W	L	D	W	L	W	W	W	D	L	D	L	L	D	W	W	W	L	L	D	L	D	L	D	W	W	L	L	W
Position	2	2	5	4	3	7	5	5	3	3	5	5	7	8	8	8	8	7	8	10	9	10	10	10	10	10	10	10	10	9

Updated to match(es) played on 27 May 2013. Source: Matches
A = Away; H = Home; W = Win; D = Draw; L = Loss

==== Results ====
20 July 2012 1	Mordovia Saransk	2–3	Lokomotiv Moscow	Saransk
19:00 MSK (UTC+4)	Panchenko 16'; Osipov 62'	Summary	Torbinski 29'; Ozdoyev 33'; Ćorluka 38'; Ozdoyev (red card) 87'	Stadium: Start Stadium; Attendance: 10,000; Referee: Mikhail Vilkov

28 July 2012 2	Lokomotiv Moscow	2–0	Krylia Sovetov	Moscow
19:00 MSK (UTC+4)	Pavlyuchenko 32'; Caicedo 67'	Summary		Stadium: Lokomotiv Stadium; Attendance: 13,442; Referee: Sergey Lapochkin

4 August 2012 3	Krasnodar	3–1	Lokomotiv Moscow	Krasnodar
20:00 MSK (UTC+3)	Pavlyuchenko 47' (o.g.); Joãozinho 57' (pen.); Movsisyan 80'	Summary	Caicedo 19'	Stadium: Kuban Stadium; Attendance: 9,300; Referee: Eduard Malyi

11 August 2012 4	Lokomotiv Moscow	2–2	Alania Vladikavkaz	Moscow
17:00 MSK (UTC+3)	Pavlyuchenko 3'; Maicon 33'	Summary	Grigoryev 23'; Priskin 37'; Dudiyev (red card) 83'	Stadium: Lokomotiv Stadium; Attendance: 11,318; Referee: Aleksandr Egorov

18 August 2012 5	Volga Nizhny Novgorod	0–2	Lokomotiv Moscow	Nizhny Novgorod, Nizhny Novgorod Oblast
17:30 MSK (UTC+3)		Summary	Caicedo 65'; Glushakov 86'	Stadium: Lokomotiv Stadium; Attendance: 9,200; Referee: Vladislav Bezborodov

25 August 2012 6	Lokomotiv Moscow	2–3	Dynamo Moscow	Moscow
13:30 MSK (UTC+4)	Maicon 21'; N'Doye 65'	Summary	Kokorin 9'; Dzsudzsák 59'; Noboa 68'	Stadium: Lokomotiv Stadium; Attendance: 12,380; Referee: Sergey Lapochkin

1 September 2012 7	Lokomotiv Moscow	2–1	Spartak Moscow	Moscow
20:30 MSK (UTC+4)	N'Doye 60'; Pavlyuchenko 66'	Summary	Kombarov 6'	Stadium: Lokomotiv Stadium; Attendance: 27,269; Referee: Aleksei Yeskov

15 September 2012 8	Lokomotiv Moscow	1–0	Rubin Kazan	Moscow
13:30 MSK (UTC+4)	Tarasov 52'	Summary	Ansaldi (yellow card) 10' (yellow-red card) 44'	Stadium: Lokomotiv Stadium; Attendance: 11,408; Referee: Sergei Karasev

22 September 2012 9	Terek Grozny	0–3	Lokomotiv Moscow	Grozny, Chechnya
20:15 MSK (UTC+4)		Summary	Grigoryev 62'; Obinna 83'; Maicon 87'	Stadium: Sultan Bilimkhanov Stadium; Attendance: 28,102; Referee: Aleksandr Egorov

29 September 2012 10	Zenit Saint Petersburg	1–1	Lokomotiv Moscow	Saint Petersburg
14:00 MSK (UTC+4)	Criscito 14'; Anyukov (yellow card) 31' (yellow-red card) 48'	Summary	N'Doye 25'; Shishkin (yellow card) 6' (yellow-red card) 32'	Stadium: Petrovsky Stadium; Attendance: 19,500; Referee: Mikhail Vilkov

6 October 2012 11	Lokomotiv Moscow	0–1	Kuban Krasnodar	Moscow
14:00 MSK (UTC+4)		Summary	Bucur 71'; Fidler (yellow card) 21' (yellow-red card) 89'	Stadium: Lokomotiv Stadium; Attendance: 10,830; Referee: Vladimir Kazmenko

21 October 2012 12	Rostov	0–0	Lokomotiv Moscow	Rostov-on-Don, Rostov Oblast
20:00 MSK (UTC+4)		Summary		Stadium: Olimp – 2 Attendance: 13,000; Referee: Sergey Kuznetsov

26 October 2012 13	Lokomotiv Moscow	1–2	Amkar Perm	Moscow
18:30 MSK (UTC+4)	Pavlyuchenko 37'	Summary	Peev 25'; Picuşceac 90+4'	Stadium: Lokomotiv Stadium; Attendance: 10,110; Referee: Aleksandr Egorov

4 November 2012 14	CSKA Moscow	2–1	Lokomotiv Moscow	Moscow
13:30 MSK (UTC+4)	Elm 29'; Wernbloom 90+2'	Summary	Yeshchenko 34'; Tarasov (yellow card) 42' (yellow-red card) 53'	Stadium: Luzhniki Stadium; Attendance: 11,994; Referee: Timur Arslanbekov

11 November 2012 15	Lokomotiv Moscow	1–1	Anzhi Makhachkala	Moscow
13:30 MSK (UTC+4)	N'Doye 84'	Summary	Carcela-Gonzalez 72'	Stadium: Lokomotiv Stadium; Attendance: 11,657; Referee: Aleksei Nikolaev (referee)

19 November 2012 16	Krylia Sovetov	0–1	Lokomotiv Moscow	Samara, Samara Oblast
17:45 MSK (UTC+4)		Summary	N'Doye 4'	Stadium: Metallurg Stadium; Attendance: 10,123; Referee: Sergey Ivanov

24 November 2012 17	Lokomotiv Moscow	3–2	Krasnodar	Moscow
16:30 MSK (UTC+4)	N'Doye 3', 20'; Obinna 51'	Summary	Shipitsin 9'; Wánderson 48'	Stadium: Lokomotiv Stadium; Attendance: 10,014; Referee: Vladislav Bezborodov

1 December 2012 18	Alania Vladikavkaz	0–1	Lokomotiv Moscow	Vladikavkaz
18:00 MSK (UTC+3)		Summary	Grigoryev 12'	Stadium: Republican Spartak Stadium; Attendance: 7,000; Referee: Vladimir Kazmenko

8 December 2012 19	Lokomotiv Moscow	0–1	Volga Nizhny Novgorod	Moscow
17:00 MSK (UTC+4)		Summary	Asildarov 39'	Stadium: Lokomotiv Stadium; Attendance: 8,214; Referee: Sergei Karasev

9 March 2013 20	Dynamo Moscow	1–0	Lokomotiv Moscow	Moscow
13:30 MSK (UTC+4)	Solovyov 20'; Yusupov (yellow card) 27' (yellow-red card) 68'	Summary		Stadium: Arena Khimki; Attendance: 11,787; Referee: Vladislav Bezborodov

16 March 2013 21	Spartak Moscow	0–0	Lokomotiv Moscow	Moscow
13:30 MSK (UTC+4)		Summary		Stadium: Luzhniki Stadium; Attendance: 24,443; Referee: Sergei Karasev

30 March 2013 22	Rubin Kazan	2–0	Lokomotiv Moscow	Kazan, Tatarstan
13:30 MSK (UTC+4)	Natcho 40'; Dyadyun 87'	Summary		Stadium: Central Stadium; Attendance: 9,649; Referee: Vladimir Kazmenko

6 April 2013 23	Lokomotiv Moscow	1–1	Terek Grozny	Moscow
19:00 MSK (UTC+4)	Ďurica 4'	Summary	Maurício 6'	Stadium: Lokomotiv Stadium; Attendance: 9,176; Referee: Aleksei Nikolaev

13 April 2013 24	Lokomotiv Moscow	0–1	Zenit Saint Petersburg	Moscow
13:30 MSK (UTC+4)		Summary	Fayzulin 16'	Stadium: Lokomotiv Stadium; Attendance: 17,016; Referee: Aleksei Yeskov

20 April 2013 25	Kuban Krasnodar	0–0	Lokomotiv Moscow	Krasnodar, Krasnodar Krai
18:30 MSK (UTC+4)		Summary		Stadium: Kuban Stadium; Attendance: 23,674; Referee: Vladislav Bezborodov

27 April 2013 26	Lokomotiv Moscow	3–1	Rostov	Moscow
18:30 MSK (UTC+4)	N'Doye 20'; Caicedo 83'; Torbinski 89'	Summary	Kalachev 28'	Stadium: Lokomotiv Stadium; Attendance: 9,137; Referee: Maksim Layushkin

5 May 2013 27	Amkar Perm	2–4	Lokomotiv Moscow	Perm, Perm Krai
16:00 MSK (UTC+4)	Georgiev 24'; Sirakov 90+2'	Summary	Miranchuk 45'; N'Doye 53' (pen.); Torbinski 64'; Yanbayev 68'	Stadium: Zvezda Stadium; Attendance: 11,800; Referee: Aleksandr Egorov

12 May 2013 28	Lokomotiv Moscow	1–4	CSKA Moscow	Moscow
13:30 MSK (UTC+4)	Tarasov 55'	Summary	Vágner Love 6', 43'; Musa 26'; Doumbia 74'	Stadium: Lokomotiv Stadium; Attendance: 24,846; Referee: Aleksey Nikolaev

20 May 2013 29	Anzhi Makhachkala	2–1	Lokomotiv Moscow	Kaspiysk, Dagestan
19:00 MSK (UTC+4)	Ćorluka 40' (o.g.); Eto'o 74'	Summary	Samedov 34'	Stadium: Anzhi-Arena; Attendance: 23,000; Referee: Vladislav Bezborodov

26 May 2013 30	Lokomotiv Moscow	2–1	Mordovia Saransk	Moscow
13:30 MSK (UTC+4)	Samedov 17' (pen.); N'Doye 23'	Summary	Pazin 90'	Stadium: Lokomotiv Stadium; Attendance: 6,107; Referee: Sergey Karasev

==== Table ====
Pos	Team	Pld	W	D	L	GF	GA	GD	Pts
7	Dynamo Moscow	30	14	6	10	41	34	+7	48 (Note: Dynamo Moscow ahead of Terek Grozny on head-to-head points; Dynamo Moscow–Terek Grozny 1–2, Terek Grozny–Dynamo Moscow 1–2.)
8	Terek Grozny	30	14	6	10	38	40	−2	48
9	Lokomotiv Moscow	30	12	7	11	39	36	+3	43
10	Krasnodar	30	12	6	12	45	39	+6	42
11	Amkar Perm	30	7	8	15	34	51	−17	29 (Note: Amkar Perm ahead of Volga Nizhny Novgorod and Rostov on head-to-head points; Amkar Perm: 7 pts, Volga Nizhny Novgorod: 5 pts, Rostov: 4 pts.)

Source: Russian Premier League
Rules for classification: 1) points; 2) number of wins; 3) head-to-head points; 4) number of head-to-head wins; 5) head-to-head goal difference; 6) number of head-to-head goals scored; 7) number of head-to-head away goals scored; 8) goal difference; 9) number of goals scored; 10) number of away goals scored; 11) position in the 2011–12 season (only used until all the regularly scheduled games have been played); 11) extra play-off game or tournament between the teams in question.

=== Russian Cup ===
26 September 2012 Round of 32	Torpedo Armavir	0–3	Lokomotiv Moscow	Armavir
16:00 MSK (UTC+4)	Makoyev (red card) 82'	Summary	Sychev 38', 73'; Caicedo 64'	Stadium: Yunost Stadium; Attendance: 3,200; Referee: German Kravchenko

31 October 2012 Round of 16	Terek Grozny	3 - 1 (a.e.t.)	Lokomotiv Moscow	Grozny
17:00 MSK (UTC+4)	Aílton 26' (pen.), 108'; Utsiyev 104'	Summary	Caicedo 82'; Samedov (red card) 90'	Stadium: Akhmad Arena; Attendance: 17,200; Referee: Igor Nizovtsev

== Squad statistics ==
As of 27 May 2013

=== Appearances and goals ===
No.	Pos	Nat	Player	Total		Premier League		Russian Cup	
No.	Pos	Nat	Player	Apps	Goals	Apps	Goals	Apps	Goals
1	GK	(Brazil) BRA	Guilherme	11	0	11+0	0	0+0	0
4	MF	(Spain) ESP	Alberto Zapater	5	0	4+1	0	0+0	0
5	DF	(Russia) RUS	Taras Burlak	18	0	15+2	0	1+0	0
6	MF	(Russia) RUS	Maksim Grigoryev	20	2	12+8	2	0+0	0
8	MF	(Russia) RUS	Denis Glushakov	28	1	26+1	1	0+1	0
10	MF	(Russia) RUS	Dmitri Loskov	1	0	0+0	0	1+0	0
13	FW	(Nigeria) NGR	Victor Obinna	28	2	14+12	2	1+1	0
14	DF	(Croatia) CRO	Vedran Ćorluka	28	1	27+0	1	1+0	0
18	FW	(Russia) RUS	Roman Pavlyuchenko	20	4	9+10	4	0+1	0
19	MF	(Russia) RUS	Aleksandr Samedov	27	2	20+6	2	1+0	0
21	MF	(Russia) RUS	Dmitri Torbinski	16	3	7+8	3	1+0	0
22	GK	(Croatia) CRO	Dario Krešić	17	0	16+0	0	1+0	0
23	MF	(Russia) RUS	Dmitri Tarasov	19	2	17+1	2	1+0	0
25	FW	(Ecuador) ECU	Felipe Caicedo	24	6	11+11	4	1+1	2
26	MF	(Belarus) BLR	Yan Tigorev	17	0	16+0	0	1+0	0
27	MF	(Russia) RUS	Magomed Ozdoyev	11	1	5+5	1	1+0	0
28	DF	(Slovakia) SVK	Ján Ďurica	21	1	18+2	1	1+0	0
29	DF	(Uzbekistan) UZB	Vitaliy Denisov	8	0	8+0	0	0+0	0
33	FW	(Senegal) SEN	Dame N'Doye	26	10	21+4	10	1+0	0
41	GK	(Russia) RUS	Miroslav Lobantsev	4	0	3+0	0	1+0	0
49	DF	(Russia) RUS	Roman Shishkin	21	0	19+1	0	1+0	0
55	DF	(Russia) RUS	Renat Yanbayev	11	1	11+0	1	0+0	0
59	MF	(Russia) RUS	Aleksei Miranchuk	6	1	6+0	1	0+0	0
65	MF	(Russia) RUS	Vyacheslav Podberyozkin	2	0	0+1	0	0+1	0
72	FW	(Russia) RUS	Kamil Mullin	1	0	0+0	0	0+1	0
79	DF	(Russia) RUS	Vitali Lystsov	1	0	0+1	0	0+0	0
90	FW	(Brazil) BRA	Maicon	19	3	12+5	3	2+0	0
Players who appeared for Lokomotiv no longer at the club:
3	MF	(Switzerland) SUI	Reto Ziegler	7	0	4+2	0	1+0	0
11	FW	(Russia) RUS	Dmitri Sychev	4	2	0+3	0	1+0	2
50	DF	(Russia) RUS	Andrey Yeshchenko	18	0	17+0	0	1+0	0
51	DF	(Russia) RUS	Maksim Belyayev	2	0	1+0	0	1+0	0
57	DF	(Russia) RUS	Georgi Burnash	1	0	0+0	0	1+0	0

=== Scorers and assistants ===
As of 27 May 2013

Place	Position	Nation	Number	Name	League goals	League assists	Cup goals	Cup assists	Total
1	FW	(Senegal)	33	Dame N'Doye	10	1	0	0	11
2	MF	(Russia)	19	Aleksandr Samedov	2	5	0	1	8
3	FW	(Ecuador)	25	Felipe Caicedo	4	1	2	0	7
4	FW	(Russia)	18	Roman Pavlyuchenko	4	2	0	0	6
5	MF	(Russia)	21	Dmitri Torbinski	3	2	0	1	6
6	FW	(Brazil)	90	Maicon	3	1	0	1	5
7	MF	(Russia)	8	Denis Glushakov	1	4	0	0	5
8	FW	(Nigeria)	13	Victor Obinna	2	2	0	0	4
8	MF	(Russia)	23	Dmitri Tarasov	2	2	0	0	4
10	MF	(Russia)	6	Maksim Grigoryev	2	1	0	0	3
11	DF	(Croatia)	14	Vedran Ćorluka	1	2	0	0	3
12	FW	(Russia)	11	Dmitri Sychev	0	0	2	0	2
13	MF	(Russia)	27	Magomed Ozdoyev	1	1	0	0	2
13	DF	(Russia)	50	Andrey Yeshchenko	1	1	0	0	2
13	DF	(Russia)	55	Renat Yanbayev	1	1	0	0	2
13	MF	(Russia)	59	Aleksei Miranchuk	1	1	0	0	2
17	DF	(Slovakia)	28	Ján Ďurica	1	0	0	0	1
18	MF	(Spain)	4	Alberto Zapater	0	1	0	0	1
18	DF	(Uzbekistan)	29	Vitaliy Denisov	0	1	0	0	1
18	DF	(Russia)	49	Roman Shishkin	0	1	0	0	1
				TOTALS	39	29	4	3	

=== Disciplinary record ===
As of 27 May 2013

Number	Nation	Position	Name	Russian Premier League		Russian Cup		Total	
Number	Nation	Position	Name	Yellow card	Red card	Yellow card	Red card	Yellow card	Red card
1	(Brazil)	GK	Guilherme	1	0	0	0	1	0
3	(Switzerland)	DF	Reto Ziegler	1	0	0	0	1	0
4	(Spain)	MF	Alberto Zapater	1	0	0	0	1	0
5	(Russia)	DF	Taras Burlak	2	0	0	0	2	0
8	(Russia)	MF	Denis Glushakov	8	0	1	0	9	0
13	(Nigeria)	FW	Victor Obinna	3	0	1	0	3	0
14	(Croatia)	DF	Vedran Ćorluka	8	0	0	0	8	0
18	(Russia)	FW	Roman Pavlyuchenko	3	0	0	0	3	0
19	(Russia)	MF	Aleksandr Samedov	4	0	0	1	4	1
21	(Russia)	MF	Dmitri Torbinski	1	0	0	0	1	0
22	(Croatia)	GK	Dario Krešić	3	0	0	0	3	0
23	(Russia)	MF	Dmitri Tarasov	8	1	1	0	9	1
25	(Ecuador)	FW	Felipe Caicedo	5	0	2	0	7	0
26	(Belarus)	MF	Yan Tigorev	6	0	1	0	7	0
27	(Russia)	MF	Magomed Ozdoyev	2	1	0	0	2	1
28	(Slovakia)	DF	Ján Ďurica	4	0	1	0	5	0
29	(Uzbekistan)	DF	Vitaliy Denisov	2	0	0	0	2	0
33	(Senegal)	FW	Dame N'Doye	2	0	0	0	2	0
49	(Russia)	DF	Roman Shishkin	6	1	1	0	7	1
50	(Russia)	DF	Andrey Yeshchenko	4	0	1	0	5	0
90	(Brazil)	FW	Maicon	2	0	1	0	3	0
			TOTALS	73	3	10	1	83	4

== Season events ==
During winter camp at Cyprus in February 2013, Guilherme was appointed team captain instead of Denis Glushakov who started 2012–2013 season with captain's armband. Roman Shishkin and Dmitri Tarasov were named vice-captains.

=== Player of the Month ===
In September 2012, the club started a monthly poll among Loko fans in the social networks to name the best player of the month. The award went to:
Vedran Ćorluka (September 2012),
Andrey Yeshchenko (October 2012),
Dame N'Doye (November 2012),
Kamil Mullin (March 2013),
Dmitri Tarasov (April 2013),
Aleksandr Samedov (May 2013).
