= Kirill Pavlov =

Kirill Pavlov may refer to:

- Kirill Aleksandrovich Pavlov (born 1990), Russian footballer
- Kirill Pavlov (weightlifter) (born 1986), Kazakhstani weightlifter
- Cyril Pavlov (1919–2017), Russian Orthodox Christian mystic, elder, wonder-worker and Archimandrite
