= Maksim Fyodorov =

Maksim Fyodorov may refer to:

- Maksim Fyodorov (footballer, born 1986), Russian footballer (striker)
- Maksim Fyodorov (footballer, born 1989), Russian footballer (midfielder)
