= FC Krasnoye Znamya Noginsk =

Russian football club

FC Krasnoye Znamya
- Full name: Футбольный клуб Красное Знамя Ногинск (Football Club Krasnoye Znamya Noginsk)
- Founded: 1911
- Ground: Znamya
- Capacity: 2,347
- Chairman: Oleg Pushenok
- Head Coach: Georgy Bychkov
- League: Russian Amateur Football League
- 2023: Russian Second League, Division B, Group 3, 13th (relegated)
- Website: http://fc-znamya.ru/
Home colours	Away colours	Third colours

FC Krasnoye Znamya Noginsk (Russian: «Красное Знамя» (Ногинск)) is a Russian football team from Noginsk. It has played professionally in 1949, between 1958 and 1969, between 1994 and 2002, and from 2020 to 2023. Krasnoye Znamya's best result was being runner-up in the second-tier Soviet First League in 1959.

The club did not pass Second League licensing for the 2024 season.

== Team name and location history ==
- 1936–1948 FC Krasnoye Znamya Noginsk
- 1949–1957 FC Spartak Noginsk
- 1958–1961 FC Trud Noginsk
- 1962 FC Trud Glukhovo
- 1963–1964 FC Trud Noginsk
- 1965–1992 FC Znamya Noginsk
- 1993–2005 FC Avtomobilist Noginsk
- 2006–2008 FC Noginsk
- 2008 FC Ekolab-SDYuShOR Elektrogorsk
- 2009 FC SDYuShOR Noginsk
- 2010–2023 FC Znamya Noginsk
- 2023– FC Krasnoye Znamya Noginsk

== Notable players ==
Players of Znamya Noginsk that have had any international caps with their national teams (not exactly while playing for Znamya):

(Russia) Roman Pavlyuchenko

(Russia) Renat Yanbayev

(Russia) Aleksandr Samedov

(Russia) Roman Shishkin

(Russia) Aleksandr Sheshukov

(Russia) Andrey Yeshchenko

(Russia) Taras Burlak
