= Roman Shishkin =

Russian footballer (born 1987)

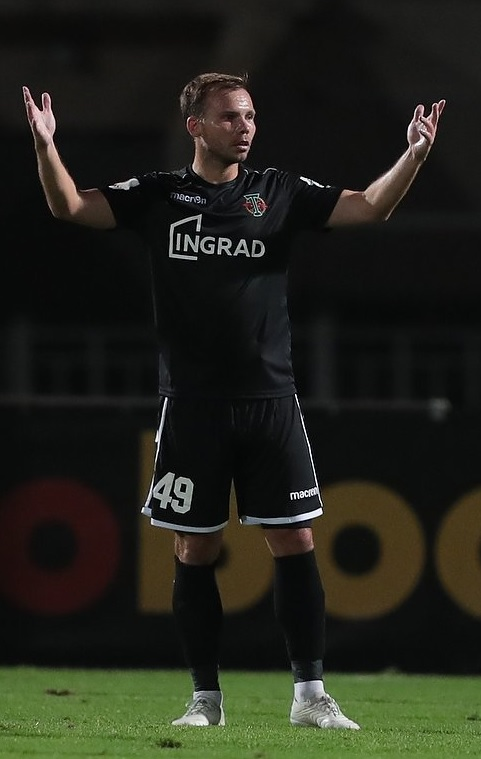
- Shishkin with Torpedo Moscow in 2019

Personal information
- Full name: Roman Aleksandrovich Shishkin
- Date of birth: 27 January 1987 (age 39)
- Place of birth: Voronezh, USSR
- Height: 1.77 m (5 ft 10 in)
- Position: Right-back

Youth career
- 1997–2001: Fakel Voronezh
- 2001–2004: Spartak Moscow

Senior career*
| Years | Team | Apps | (Gls) |
| 2004–2010 | Spartak Moscow | 54 | (1) |
| 2009 | → FC Krylia Sovetov Samara (loan) | 25 | (0) |
| 2010–2017 | Lokomotiv Moscow | 153 | (5) |
| 2017 | → Krasnodar (loan) | 6 | (0) |
| 2017–2019 | Krasnodar | 23 | (0) |
| 2018 | → Krasnodar-2 | 2 | (0) |
| 2019 | → Krylia Sovetov Samara (loan) | 12 | (0) |
| 2019 | Torpedo Moscow | 18 | (1) |
| 2020 | Spartak-2 Moscow | 2 | (0) |
| 2020–2022 | FC Znamya Noginsk | 41 | (4) |

International career
| 2004–2008 | Russia U-21 | 12 | (0) |
| 2007–2017 | Russia | 16 | (0) |
- * Club domestic league appearances and goals

Roman Aleksandrovich Shishkin (Russian: Роман Александрович Шишкин; born 27 January 1987) is a Russian former professional footballer who played as a right-back.

== Early life ==
Roman Shishkin was born in Voronezh. He is a son of Aleksandr Shishkin, a driver.

== Club career ==
Shishkin graduated from local football school and at age 15 secured his first professional contract with FC Fakel. After some time with Fakel he moved to Spartak Moscow.

He made his professional debut for Spartak in 2004 when Nevio Scala started fielding a lot of young players. His Russian Premier League debut was on 7 July 2004 in a game against Kuban Krasnodar. Roman eventually lost his position in the first team. In 2006 when Fedotov was appointed as a manager, Shishkin became a first team regular. Shishkin played as a right fullback.

On 12 September 2006, Shishkin made his European debut after he came in as a substitute in the UEFA Champions League match against Bayern Munich. At the end of 2006 UEFA named Shishkin among Europe's eight most prospective footballers and described him as having a good shot from distance and being useful from set-pieces

In 2009, Spartak Moscow sent Shiskin on loan to Krylia Sovetov Samara.

On 6 July 2010, Shishkin signed with Lokomotiv Moscow. His attitude and performances for the club were rewarded in 2013 when he was named vice-captain by manager Slaven Bilić.

On 28 January 2017, he joined Krasnodar on loan until the end of the 2016–17 season.

On 3 July 2017, he returned to Krasnodar, signing a three-year contract as a free agent upon the expiration of his Lokomotiv contract.

On 13 January 2019, he returned to Krylia Sovetov Samara on loan until the end of the 2018–19 season.

On 11 July 2019, Shishkin left Krasnodar by mutual consent.

On 12 August 2019, he signed with the Russian Football National League club Torpedo Moscow. His Torpedo contract was terminated by mutual consent on 17 February 2020.

On 19 February 2020 he was registered as a player of Spartak-2 Moscow.

On 11 September 2020 he signed with the third-tier Russian Professional Football League club FC Znamya Noginsk which also featured former Russian internationals Roman Pavlyuchenko, Aleksandr Samedov, Renat Yanbayev and Aleksandr Sheshukov.

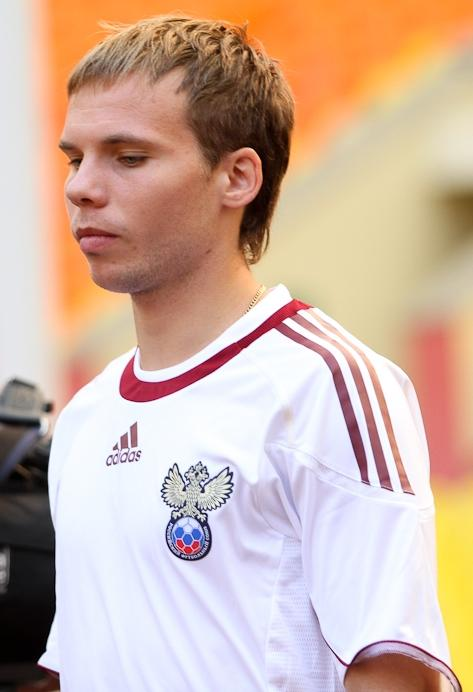
Shishkin with the Russia national team in 2011

== International career ==
Shiskin was invited by Guus Hiddink to participate in the national team training sessions. His debut for the national team took place on 24 March 2007 as he played the whole match during Russia's 2–0 victory over Estonia.

After a few years' absence from the squad, Shishkin forced his way back into contention following some good performances for Lokomotiv Moscow, and he would play a part in Russia's successful qualifying campaign for Euro 2012. He was named in Dick Advocaat's provisional squad for the tournament itself, but had to withdraw due to a stomach ailment.

Shishkin did not appear for the national team again until late 2015, when he featured in friendlies against Portugal and Croatia. He was then included by Leonid Slutsky in the Russian squad for Euro 2016.

== Career statistics ==
=== Club ===
As of 13 May 2018

Appearances and goals by club, season and competition
| Club | Season | League | | | Cup | | Continental | | Other | | Total | |
| Club | Season | Division | Apps | Goals | Apps | Goals | Apps | Goals | Apps | Goals | Apps | Goals |
|---|---|---|---|---|---|---|---|---|---|---|---|---|
| Spartak Moscow | 2003 | Russian Premier League | 0 | 0 | 0 | 0 | 0 | 0 | – | | 0 | 0 |
| Spartak Moscow | 2004 | Russian Premier League | 1 | 0 | 1 | 0 | 5 | 0 | – | | 7 | 0 |
| Spartak Moscow | 2005 | Russian Premier League | 0 | 0 | 1 | 0 | – | | – | | 1 | 0 |
| Spartak Moscow | 2006 | Russian Premier League | 14 | 1 | 1 | 0 | 8 | 0 | – | | 23 | 1 |
| Spartak Moscow | 2007 | Russian Premier League | 26 | 0 | 7 | 0 | 6 | 0 | 1 (Note: One appearance in the Russian Super Cup) | 0 | 40 | 0 |
| Spartak Moscow | 2008 | Russian Premier League | 13 | 0 | 1 | 0 | 6 | 0 | – | | 20 | 0 |
| Spartak Moscow | 2010 | Russian Premier League | 0 | 0 | 0 | 0 | – | | – | | 0 | 0 |
| Spartak Moscow | Total | | 54 | 1 | 11 | 0 | 25 | 0 | 1 | 0 | 91 | 1 |
| Krylia Sovetov Samara (loan) | 2009 | Russian Premier League | 25 | 0 | 1 | 0 | 2 | 0 | – | | 28 | 0 |
| Lokomotiv Moscow | 2010 | Russian Premier League | 15 | 0 | 0 | 0 | 2 | 0 | – | | 17 | 0 |
| Lokomotiv Moscow | 2011–12 | Russian Premier League | 41 | 3 | 3 | 0 | 9 | 0 | – | | 53 | 3 |
| Lokomotiv Moscow | 2012–13 | Russian Premier League | 20 | 0 | 1 | 0 | – | | – | | 21 | 0 |
| Lokomotiv Moscow | 2013–14 | Russian Premier League | 24 | 2 | 1 | 0 | – | | – | | 25 | 2 |
| Lokomotiv Moscow | 2014–15 | Russian Premier League | 23 | 0 | 4 | 0 | 2 | 0 | – | | 29 | 0 |
| Lokomotiv Moscow | 2015–16 | Russian Premier League | 19 | 0 | 1 | 0 | 5 | 0 | 1 (Note: One appearance in the Russian Super Cup) | 0 | 26 | 0 |
| Lokomotiv Moscow | 2016–17 | Russian Premier League | 11 | 0 | 1 | 0 | – | | – | | 12 | 0 |
| Lokomotiv Moscow | Total | | 153 | 5 | 11 | 0 | 18 | 0 | 1 | 0 | 183 | 5 |
| Krasnodar (loan) | 2016–17 | Russian Premier League | 6 | 0 | 1 | 0 | 0 | 0 | – | | 7 | 0 |
| Krasnodar | 2017–18 | Russian Premier League | 20 | 0 | 0 | 0 | 2 | 0 | – | | 22 | 0 |
| Career total | | | 258 | 6 | 24 | 0 | 47 | 0 | 2 | 0 | 331 | 6 |

=== International ===
Appearances and goals by national team and year
| National team | Year | Apps | Goals |
|---|---|---|---|
| Russia | 2007 | 1 | 0 |
| Russia | 2008 | 0 | 0 |
| Russia | 2009 | 0 | 0 |
| Russia | 2010 | 1 | 0 |
| Russia | 2011 | 6 | 0 |
| Russia | 2015 | 2 | 0 |
| Russia | 2016 | 2 | 0 |
| Total | | 12 | 0 |

== Honours ==
Lokomotiv Moscow

- Russian Cup: 2014–15

Individual

- Best Young Player of Russian Premier League: 2006
- List of 33 top players of the Russian league: #3 (2006), #3 (2011/12), #2 (2013/14)
