= Roman Bykov =

Russian football player (born 1992)

Personal information
- Full name: Roman Aleksandrovich Bykov
- Date of birth: 16 March 1992 (age 34)
- Place of birth: Kotovsk, Ukraine
- Height: 1.83 m (6 ft 0 in)
- Position: Midfielder

Youth career
- FC Lokomotiv Moscow

Senior career*
Years	Team	Apps	(Gls)
2009–2011	FC Lokomotiv Moscow	0	(0)
2012–2013	FC Shinnik Yaroslavl	1	(0)
2013–2014	FC Vityaz Podolsk	9	(0)
2014–2015	FC Yakutiya Yakutsk	12	(0)
2015–2018	SFC CRFSO Smolensk	64	(8)
2018	FC Vityaz Podolsk (amateur)		
2019	FC Kolomna	8	(1)
- * Club domestic league appearances and goals

Roman Aleksandrovich Bykov (Russian: Роман Александрович Быков; born 16 March 1992) is a Ukrainian-born Russian former professional football player.

== Club career ==
He made his Russian Football National League debut for FC Shinnik Yaroslavl on 8 May 2012 in a game against FC Mordovia Saransk.
