= Aleksandr Yarkovoy =

Russian footballer

Personal information
- Full name: Aleksandr Aleksandrovich Yarkovoy
- Date of birth: 10 February 1993 (age 33)
- Place of birth: Moscow, Russia
- Height: 1.91 m (6 ft 3 in)
- Position: Defender

Senior career*
Years	Team	Apps	(Gls)
2010–2011	FC Lokomotiv-2 Moscow	1	(0)
2012–2013	FC Lokomotiv Moscow	0	(0)
2013–2014	FC Khimki	29	(1)
2014	FC Dynamo GTS Stavropol	7	(0)
2015	FC Zenit Penza	9	(0)
2015–2017	FC Khimki	22	(0)
2017–2018	FC Lokomotiv Moscow	0	(0)
2017–2018	→ FC Kazanka Moscow	17	(2)
2018	FC Ryazan	12	(1)
2019	FSC Dolgoprudny	6	(1)
2019–2020	FC Krymteplytsia Molodizhne	17	(4)

International career
2010	Russia U17	6	(1)
- * Club domestic league appearances and goals

Aleksandr Aleksandrovich Yarkovoy (Russian: Александр Александрович Ярковой; born 10 February 1993) is a Russian former football defender.

== Club career ==
He made his debut in the Russian Second Division for FC Lokomotiv-2 Moscow on 23 June 2011 in a game against FC Dnepr Smolensk.

He made his Russian Football National League debut for FC Khimki on 17 August 2016 in a game against FC Fakel Voronezh.
