= Vladislav Makoyev =

Russian footballer

Personal information
- Full name: Vladislav Ruslanovich Makoyev
- Date of birth: 20 October 1982 (age 44)
- Height: 1.83 m (6 ft 0 in)
- Position: Goalkeeper

Senior career*
Years	Team	Apps	(Gls)
1999–2001	FC Avtodor Vladikavkaz	36	(0)
2002–2003	FC Alania Vladikavkaz	0	(0)
2003–2005	FC KAMAZ Naberezhnye Chelny	8	(0)
2006	FC SOYUZ-Gazprom Izhevsk	1	(0)
2008	FC Abinsk (amateur)		
2008–2009	FC Druzhba Maykop	42	(0)
2010–2012	FC Torpedo Armavir	79	(0)
2013	FC Druzhba Maykop	9	(0)
- * Club domestic league appearances and goals

Vladislav Ruslanovich Makoyev (Russian: Владислав Русланович Макоев; born 20 October 1982) is a former Russian professional football player.

== Club career ==
He made his Russian Football National League debut for FC KAMAZ Naberezhnye Chelny on 16 April 2004 in a game against FC Dynamo Bryansk.
