= Aleksandr Pankovets =

Russian footballer

Personal information
- Full name: Aleksandr Anatolyevich Pankovets
- Date of birth: 18 February 1990 (age 36)
- Height: 1.83 m (6 ft 0 in)
- Position: Forward

Senior career*
Years	Team	Apps	(Gls)
2006–2007	FC Sodovik Sterlitamak	19	(1)
2008–2010	FC Lokomotiv Moscow	0	(0)
2010	→ FC Lokomotiv-2 Moscow	0	(0)
2011–2012	FC Nosta Novotroitsk	36	(0)
2014–2017	FC Sterlitamak		
- * Club domestic league appearances and goals

Aleksandr Anatolyevich Pankovets (Russian: Александр Анатольевич Панковец; born 18 February 1990) is a former Russian professional footballer.

== Club career ==
He made his professional debut in the Russian Football National League on 30 April 2007 for FC Sodovik Sterlitamak in a game against FC KAMAZ Naberezhnye Chelny. That was his only season in the FNL.
