= Mikhail Petrusyov =

Russian footballer

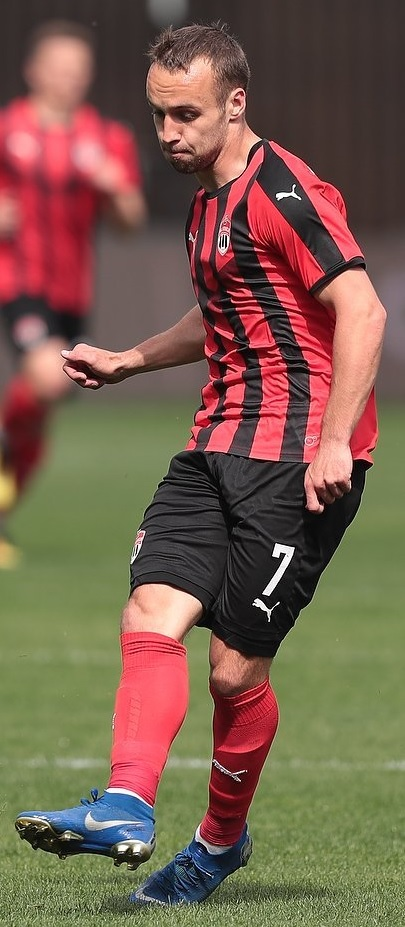
- Petrusyov with Khimki in 2019

Personal information
- Full name: Mikhail Vitalyevich Petrusyov
- Date of birth: 21 November 1994 (age 31)
- Place of birth: Smolensk, Russia
- Height: 1.75 m (5 ft 9 in)
- Positions: Midfielder; forward

Youth career
- FC Pechyorsk

Senior career*
Years	Team	Apps	(Gls)
2011	FC Dnepr Smolensk	26	(4)
2012–2014	FC Lokomotiv Moscow	0	(0)
2012–2014	→ FC Dnepr Smolensk (loan)	52	(6)
2014–2016	FC Dnepr Smolensk	54	(11)
2016–2019	FC Khimki	105	(16)
2019	→ FC Khimki-M	3	(0)
2019–2021	FC Fakel Voronezh	29	(3)
2021–2022	FC SKA Rostov-on-Don	15	(3)

International career
2011	Russia U-17	2	(1)
- * Club domestic league appearances and goals

Mikhail Vitalyevich Petrusyov (Russian: Михаил Витальевич Петрусёв; born 21 November 1994) is a Russian former football player.

== Club career ==
He made his debut in the Russian Second Division for FC Dnepr Smolensk on 18 April 2011 in a game against FC Dynamo Kostroma.

He made his Russian Football National League debut for FC Khimki on 11 July 2016 in a game against FC Tosno.
