= Dmitri Tarasov (footballer) =

Russian footballer

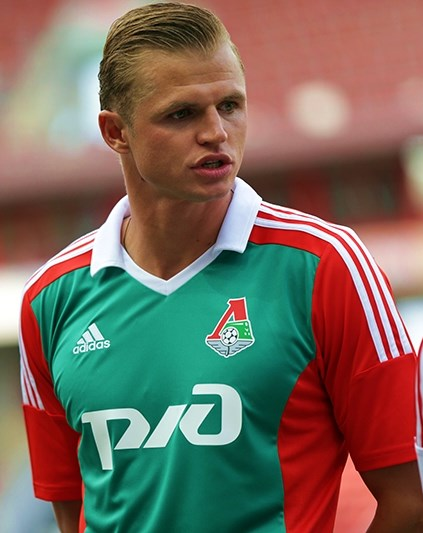
- Tarasov with FC Lokomotiv Moscow in 2014

Personal information
- Full name: Dmitri Alekseyevich Tarasov
- Date of birth: 18 March 1987 (age 39)
- Place of birth: Moscow, Russia
- Height: 1.92 m (6 ft 4 in)
- Position: Midfielder

Youth career
- 1994–1999: Trudovye Rezervy Moscow
- 1999–2005: Spartak Moscow

Senior career*
Years	Team	Apps	(Gls)
2006–2008	Tom Tomsk	54	(2)
2009	FC Moscow	25	(2)
2010–2019	Lokomotiv Moscow	152	(11)
2020	Rubin Kazan	11	(0)
2021	Veles Moscow	7	(0)

International career
2007–2008	Russia U-21	2	(0)
2013–2017	Russia	8	(1)
- * Club domestic league appearances and goals

Dmitri Alekseyevich Tarasov (Russian: Дми́трий Алексе́евич Тара́сов; born 18 March 1987) is a Russian former footballer who played as a central midfielder or defensive midfielder.

== Career ==
=== Club ===
Tarasov began his career at FC Spartak Moscow, then joined FC Tom Tomsk. On 2 February 2009, FC Moscow signed the attacking midfielder on a free transfer. On 28 December 2009, Lokomotiv announced his signing.
During Lokomotiv period of his career, Tarasov established himself as holding midfielder. His authority as a starting XI player was confirmed during winter mid-season 2012-13 when he was named vice-captain. On 20 April 2013, Tarasov took captain's armband for the first time in away game versus FC Kuban Krasnodar (0-0). Later Tarasov won monthly polls among Loko fans in the social networks for best player of the month in April 2013 and September 2013.

On 30 June 2019, he left Lokomotiv after his contract expired.

On 18 February 2020, he signed with Rubin Kazan until the end of the 2019–20 season. On 21 February 2020 he broke his calf bone in a training session and wasn't expected to be able to play for Rubin for the duration of the contract. However, 2019–20 Russian Premier League season was extended due to the COVID-19 pandemic in Russia and Tarasov recovered and made his debut for Rubin on 5 July 2020 in a game against FC Orenburg. On 28 July 2020, he extended his Rubin contract until the end of 2020. On 17 December 2020 Rubin announced he will leave the club when his contract expires.

He started the 2021–22 season with Russian Football National League club FC Veles Moscow. On 19 October 2021, he left Veles and paused his professional career to spend more life with his family.

=== Celebrity ===
After his injury, he decides to join (Media Team) NaSporte(OnSport), OnSporte plays in Moscow Celebrity League, just Celebrity League, and friendly matches with other (Media Teams), The rules are that every single player has to be a celebrity, character, or make videos on YouTube, TikTok, Instagram, and other Social Media platforms. On Sport is a new team to all of the Media Leagues and already earned a reputation, but he won't switch teams because of the money the teams are paying him.

=== International ===
Tarasov was a member of the Russian Under 21 national team. In October 2009, he was called up to the Russia national football team for the 2010 FIFA World Cup qualifier against Azerbaijan. He was called up again by Fabio Capello to the national team for the 2014 FIFA World Cup qualifiers against Portugal and against Azerbaijan in October 2012. He made his debut for the national team on 15 November 2013 in a friendly game against Serbia. He scored his first national team goal on 19 November 2013 in a friendly against South Korea.

== Career statistics ==
=== Club ===
As of 13 May 2018

Club	Season	League		Cup		Europe		Other		Total	
Club	Season	Apps	Goals	Apps	Goals	Apps	Goals	Apps	Goals	Apps	Goals
Tom Tomsk	2006	4	0	—		—		—		4	0
Tom Tomsk	2007	24	1	3	1	—		—		27	2
Tom Tomsk	2008	26	1	5	1	—		—		31	2
Tom Tomsk	Total	54	2	8	2	0	0	0	0	62	4
FC Moscow	2009	25	2	5	2	—		—		30	4
FC Moscow	Total	25	2	5	2	0	0	0	0	30	4
Lokomotiv Moscow	2010	26	1	—		2	0	—		28	1
Lokomotiv Moscow	2011–12	9	1	1	0	4	0	—		14	1
Lokomotiv Moscow	2012–13	18	2	1	0	—		—		19	2
Lokomotiv Moscow	2013–14	17	4	—		—		—		17	4
Lokomotiv Moscow	2014–15	14	0	2	0	2	0	—		18	0
Lokomotiv Moscow	2015–16	23	0	0	0	5	1	1 (Note: One appearance in Russian Super Cup)	0	29	1
Lokomotiv Moscow	2016–17	12	1	2	0	—		—		12	1
Lokomotiv Moscow	2017–18	24	2	1	0	8	0	1 (Note: One appearance in Russian Super Cup)	0	34	2
Lokomotiv Moscow	Total	143	11	7	0	21	1	2	0	171	12
Career total		222	15	20	4	21	1	2	0	263	20

=== International ===
As of 10 October 2017

National team	Year	Apps	Goals
Russia
Russia	2013	2	1
Russia	2014	0	0
Russia	2015	0	0
Russia	2016	2	0
Russia	2017	4	0
Total		8	1

Statistics accurate as of match played 26 March 2016

=== International goals ===
Scores and results list Russia's goal tally first.

№	Date	Venue	Opponent	Score	Result	Competition
1.	19 November 2013	Zabeel Stadium, Dubai, United Arab Emirates	South Korea	2–1	2–1	Friendly

== Honours ==
Lokomotiv Moscow

- Russian Premier League: 2017–18
- Russian Cup: 2014–15, 2016–17, 2018–19

== Controversy ==
Tarasov caused controversy when he removed his shirt to reveal a vest displaying a picture of Vladimir Putin with the words "the most polite president", during an already politically charged match between Turkish opponents Fenerbahce in their 2-0 Europa League defeat on Tuesday 16 February 2016. It was anticipated that an official judging on the stunt would turn up in one month time. UEFA chose to fine him €5000.

== Personal life ==
Tarasov has a daughter from his first wife, Russian gymnast Oksana Ponomarenko. Tarasov was then married to Russian TV personality Olga Buzova from June 2012 til December 2016. In January 2018, Tarasov married Russian model Anastasia Tarasova (née Kostenko) and they have 2 daughters and 2 sons together.
