= Anton Amelchenko =

Belarusian footballer

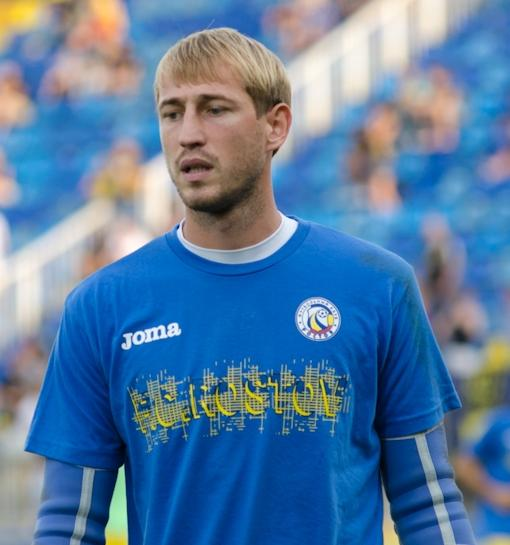
- Amelchenko with FC Rostov in 2013

Personal information
- Date of birth: 27 March 1985 (age 41)
- Place of birth: Gomel, Belarusian SSR
- Height: 1.92 m (6 ft 3 1/2 in)
- Position: Goalkeeper

Team information
- Current team: Slavia Mozyr (gk coach)

Youth career
- 2001–2004: Gomel

Senior career*
| Years | Team | Apps | (Gls) |
| 2004–2005 | Gomel | 20 | (0) |
| 2006–2009 | Moscow | 15 | (0) |
| 2010 | Rostov | 23 | (0) |
| 2011–2013 | Lokomotiv Moscow | 0 | (0) |
| 2012–2013 | → Terek Grozny (loan) | 9 | (0) |
| 2013–2015 | Rostov | 3 | (0) |
| 2015 | Fakel Voronezh | 2 | (0) |
| 2016 | Belshina Bobruisk | 8 | (0) |
| 2017 | Krumkachy Minsk | 9 | (0) |
| 2023 | Slavia Mozyr | 0 | (0) |

International career
| 2005–2006 | Belarus U21 | 14 | (0) |
| 2007–2011 | Belarus | 7 | (0) |

Managerial career
- 2018–2019: Gomel (reserves gk coach)
- 2020–2021: Gomel (gk coach)
- 2021–2022: Shakhtyor Soligorsk (gk coach)
- 2022: Khimki (academy gk coach)
- 2022–: Slavia Mozyr (gk coach)
- * Club domestic league appearances and goals

Anton Amelchenko (Belarusian: Антон Амельчанка (Anton Amelchanka); Russian: Антон Амельченко; born 27 March 1985) is a Belarusian football coach and a former player. He works as a goalkeeping coach with Slavia Mozyr. He earned several caps for Belarus national side between 2007 and 2011.
