= Aleksandr Minchenkov =

Russian footballer

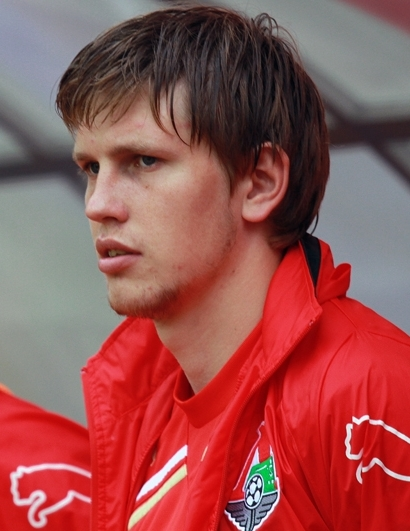

Personal information
- Full name: Aleksandr Viktorovich Minchenkov
- Date of birth: 13 January 1989 (age 37)
- Place of birth: Moscow, Soviet Union
- Height: 1.85 m (6 ft 1 in)
- Position: Forward

Team information
- Current team: FC Chertanovo Moscow

Youth career
- Chertanovo Education Center

Senior career*
Years	Team	Apps	(Gls)
2008–2012	FC Lokomotiv Moscow	23	(3)
2010	→ FC Dynamo Bryansk (loan)	15	(7)
2012	→ FC Mordovia Saransk (loan)	13	(1)
2013–2015	FC Baltika Kaliningrad	47	(6)
2016–2017	SFC CRFSO Smolensk	16	(3)

Managerial career
- 2021–: FC Chertanovo Moscow (academy)
- * Club domestic league appearances and goals

Aleksandr Viktorovich Minchenkov (Russian: Александр Викторович Минченков; born 13 January 1989) is a Russian football coach and a former player. He works as a coach at the academy of FC Chertanovo Moscow.

== Career statistics ==
=== Club ===
As of 24 July 2011

Club	Season	League		Cup		Europe		Total	
Club	Season	Apps	Goals	Apps	Goals	Apps	Goals	Apps	Goals
Lokomotiv M.	2008	4	0	0	0	-	-	4	0
Lokomotiv M.	2009	12	1	2	0	-	-	14	1
Lokomotiv M.	2010	0	0	1	0	0	0	1	0
Lokomotiv M.	Total	16	1	3	0	0	0	19	1
Dynamo Bryansk	2010	15	7	0	0	-	-	15	7
Dynamo Bryansk	Total	15	7	0	0	0	0	15	7
Lokomotiv M.	2011-12	4	2	0	0	0	0	4	2
Lokomotiv M.	Total	4	2	0	0	0	0	4	2
Career Totals		35	10	3	0	0	0	38	10
