= Maksim Fyodorov (footballer, born 1986) =

Russian footballer

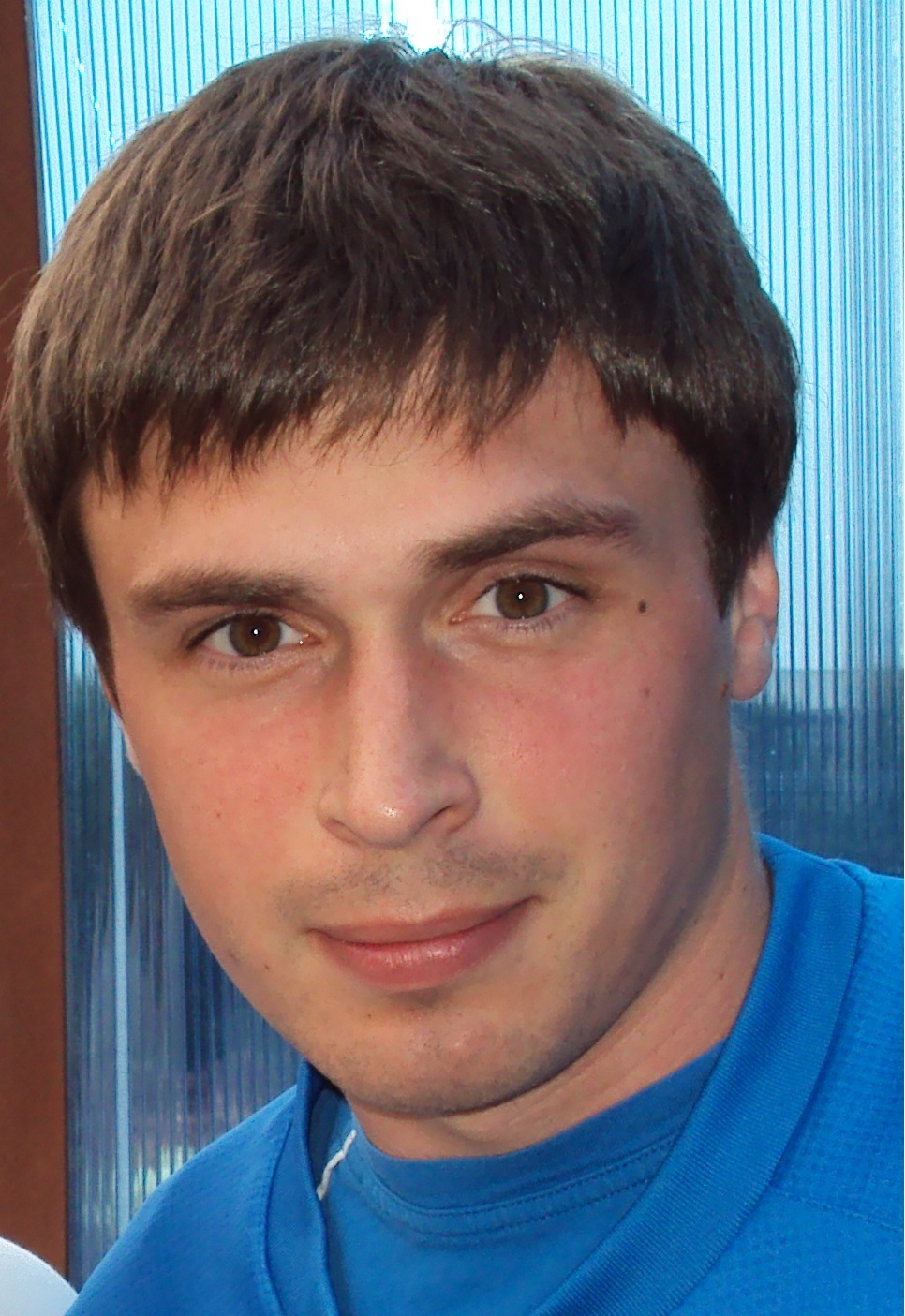

Personal information
- Full name: Maksim Viktorovich Fyodorov
- Date of birth: 20 January 1986 (age 40)
- Place of birth: Chekhov, Moscow Oblast, Russian SFSR
- Height: 1.80 m (5 ft 11 in)
- Position: Striker

Youth career
- Smena Kaluga

Senior career*
Years	Team	Apps	(Gls)
2002–2008	FC Dynamo Kyiv	0	(0)
2002–2005	→ FC Dynamo-3 Kyiv	27	(4)
2003–2007	→ FC Dynamo-2 Kyiv	28	(2)
2007	→ FC CSKA Kyiv (loan)	11	(0)
2008	→ Mika FC (loan)	12	(0)
2009	FC Zvezda Ryazan	22	(1)
2010–2012	FC Luch-Energiya Vladivostok	49	(5)
2012–2013	FC Torpedo Moscow	7	(0)
2013	→ FC Petrotrest Saint Petersburg (loan)	10	(0)
2013–2014	FC Dynamo Saint Petersburg	20	(0)
- * Club domestic league appearances and goals

Maksim Viktorovich Fyodorov (Russian: Максим Викторович Фёдоров; born 20 January 1986) is a former Russian professional football player.

== Club career ==
He spent the first five seasons of his senior career in the FC Dynamo Kyiv system, but did not make any appearances for the first squad.

He played 3 seasons in the Russian Football National League for 4 different teams.
