= Yan Tsiharaw =

Belarusian footballer (born 1984)

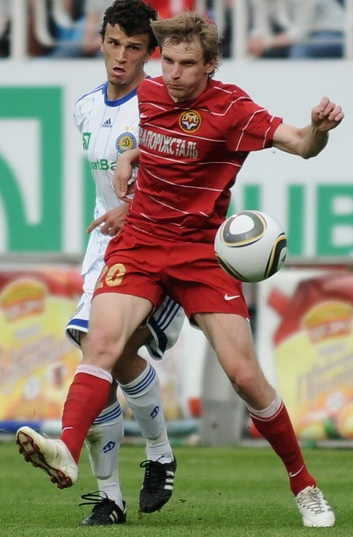

Personal information
- Full name: Yan Alyaksandravich Tsiharaw
- Date of birth: 10 March 1984 (age 42)
- Place of birth: Ussuriysk, Soviet Union
- Height: 1.80 m (5 ft 11 in)
- Position: Midfielder

Youth career
- 2001–2002: Dinamo Minsk

Senior career*
Years	Team	Apps	(Gls)
2001	Dinamo-2 Minsk	26	(1)
2002–2006	Dinamo Minsk	117	(0)
2006–2010	Metalurh Zaporizhzhya	111	(1)
2011	Tom Tomsk	12	(0)
2012–2015	Lokomotiv Moscow	33	(0)
2015–2016	Dinamo Minsk	3	(0)

International career
2004–2006	Belarus U21	16	(0)
2005–2014	Belarus	35	(1)
- * Club domestic league appearances and goals

Yan Alyaksandravich Tsiharaw (Belarusian: Ян Аляксандравіч Цігараў, Russian: Ян Александрович Тигорев, Yan Aleksandrovich Tigorev; born 10 March 1984) is a Belarusian former professional footballer who played as a midfielder. He played for the Belarus national team in four qualifying matches for the UEFA Euro 2008 tournament.

== Career statistics ==
Scores and results list Belarus' goal tally first.

#	Date	Venue	Opponent	Score	Result	Competition
1.	15 October 2013	Torpedo Stadium (Zhodino), Belarus	Japan	1–0	1–0	Friendly

== Honours ==
Dinamo Minsk

- Belarusian Premier League: 2004
- Belarusian Cup: 2002–03
