= Kirill Pavlov (footballer) =

Russian footballer

Personal information
- Full name: Kirill Aleksandrovich Pavlov
- Date of birth: 30 January 1990 (age 36)
- Height: 1.75 m (5 ft 9 in)
- Position: Left back

Senior career*
Years	Team	Apps	(Gls)
2008–2009	FC Lokomotiv Moscow	1	(0)
2010	FC Lokomotiv-2 Moscow	26	(1)
2011–2012	FC Lokomotiv Moscow	0	(0)
2012	→ FC Novokuznetsk (loan)	1	(0)
2012–2013	FC Lokomotiv-2 Moscow	14	(1)
2014	FC Kaluga	8	(0)
2014–2017	Solyaris Moscow	60	(2)
- * Club domestic league appearances and goals

Kirill Aleksandrovich Pavlov (Russian: Кирилл Александрович Павлов; born 30 January 1990) is a Russian former professional footballer.

== Club career ==
He made his debut in the Russian Premier League on 2 August 2009 for FC Lokomotiv Moscow in a game against FC Rostov.
