= Maicon (footballer, born 1990) =

Brazilian footballer

Maicon Marques
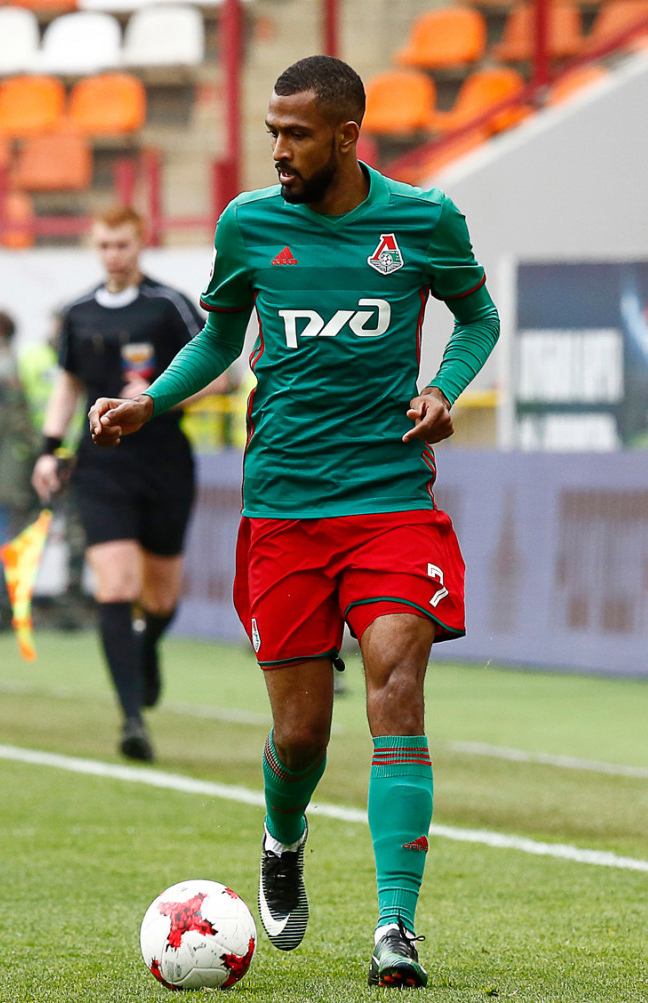
- Maicon in action with Lokomotiv Moscow in 2017

Personal information
- Full name: Maicon Marques Bitencourt
- Date of birth: 18 February 1990 (age 36)
- Place of birth: Duque de Caxias, Brazil
- Height: 1.83 m (6 ft 0 in)
- Position: Winger

Youth career
- 2001–2008: Fluminense

Senior career*
| Years | Team | Apps | (Gls) |
| 2008–2010 | Fluminense | 34 | (2) |
| 2010–2017 | Lokomotiv Moscow | 158 | (23) |
| 2017–2019 | Antalyaspor | 44 | (6) |
| 2019–2020 | Atlético Mineiro | 10 | (0) |
| 2020–2022 | Buriram United | 26 | (8) |
| Total | | 272 | (39) |

International career
| 2007 | Brazil U17 | 2 | (1) |
| 2009 | Brazil U20 | 10 | (3) |
- * Club domestic league appearances and goals as of 2 March 2020

Maicon Marques Bitencourt (born 18 February 1990), simply known as Maicon, is a Brazilian professional footballer who plays as a winger.

== Club career ==
=== Fluminense ===
Born in Duque de Caxias, Rio de Janeiro, Maicon joined Fluminense's youth setup in 2001, aged 11. Promoted to the main squad on 11 March 2008 by manager Renato Portaluppi, he made his debut fifteen days later by coming on as a substitute for Darío Conca in a 4–1 Campeonato Carioca home routing of Mesquita.

Maicon made his Série A debut on 18 May 2008, replacing Léo Itaperuna in a 2–0 home loss against Náutico. He scored his first professional goal the following 31 January, netting his team's second in a 3–0 home defeat of Resende; his first top tier goal occurred on 7 August, as he scored the last in a 5–1 home thrashing of Sport.

In 2009, Fluminense sold 50% of Maicon's rights along with other players in different ratio to Traffic Group.

=== Lokomotiv Moscow ===
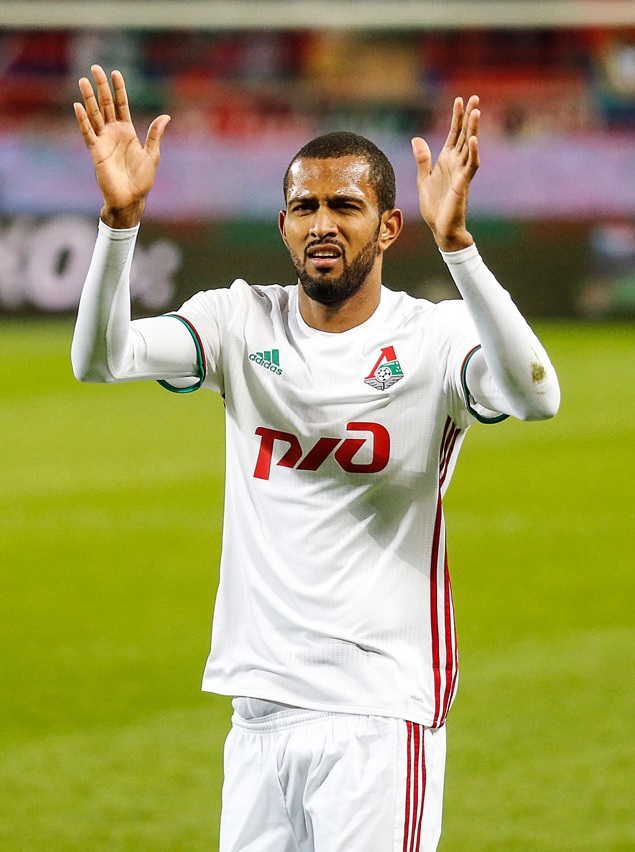
Maicon with Lokomotiv Moscow in 2016

On 10 March 2010, Maicon joined Lokomotiv Moscow in a four-and-a-half-year contract. He made his debut abroad ten days later, replacing goalscorer Dmitri Sychev in a 3–0 home win against Krylia Sovetov Samara.

Maicon scored his first goal abroad on 15 May 2010, netting the last in a 2–0 home win against Amkar Perm. A regular starter in the following campaigns, he scored a brace in a 4–0 home routing of Anzhi Makhachkala on 5 November 2016.

=== Antalyaspor ===
On 16 June 2017, after seven years in Russia, Maicon moved to Turkey after agreeing to a contract with Antalyaspor, effective as of 1 July. On 9 January 2019, Antalyaspor announced that Maicon's contract was terminated by mutual consent.

=== Atlético Mineiro ===
On 14 January 2019, Maicon returned to Brazil and joined Atlético Mineiro on a free transfer. He left the club in February 2020.

== International career ==
Maicon represented Brazil at under-17 and under-20 levels, playing an essential role in the latter's victory against Germany for the quarter-finals of the 2009 FIFA U-20 World Cup in Egypt by scoring a brace in a 2–1 victory, which allowed Brazil to proceed to the semifinals. In the final against Ghana, he missed one of the three penalties missed by Brazil, resulting in Ghana winning the tournament.

== Career statistics ==
As of 29 May 2022

Appearances and goals by club, season and competition
| Club | Season | League | | | State League | | Cup | | League Cup | | Continental | | Other | | Total | |
| Club | Season | Division | Apps | Goals | Apps | Goals | Apps | Goals | Apps | Goals | Apps | Goals | Apps | Goals | Apps | Goals |
|---|---|---|---|---|---|---|---|---|---|---|---|---|---|---|---|---|
| Fluminense | 2008 | Série A | 13 | 0 | 4 | 0 | — | | — | | — | | — | | 17 | 0 |
| Fluminense | 2009 | Série A | 21 | 2 | 13 | 2 | 3 | 0 | — | | 5 (Note: Appearance(s) in Copa Sudamericana) | 0 | — | | 42 | 4 |
| Fluminense | 2010 | Série A | 0 | 0 | 8 | 2 | — | | — | | — | | — | | 8 | 2 |
| Fluminense | Total | | 34 | 2 | 25 | 4 | 3 | 0 | — | | 5 | 0 | — | | 67 | 6 |
| Lokomotiv Moscow | 2010 | Russian Premier League | 18 | 3 | — | | — | | — | | 2 (Note: Appearance(s) in UEFA Europa League) | 0 | — | | 20 | 3 |
| Lokomotiv Moscow | 2011–12 | Russian Premier League | 37 | 4 | — | | 2 | 1 | — | | 9 | 3 | — | | 48 | 8 |
| Lokomotiv Moscow | 2012–13 | Russian Premier League | 17 | 3 | — | | 2 | 0 | — | | — | | — | | 19 | 3 |
| Lokomotiv Moscow | 2013–14 | Russian Premier League | 24 | 5 | — | | — | | — | | — | | — | | 24 | 5 |
| Lokomotiv Moscow | 2014–15 | Russian Premier League | 24 | 0 | — | | 4 | 0 | — | | 2 | 0 | — | | 30 | 0 |
| Lokomotiv Moscow | 2015–16 | Russian Premier League | 14 | 3 | — | | 2 | 0 | — | | 7 | 2 | 1 (Note: Appearance(s) in Russian Super Cup) | 0 | 24 | 5 |
| Lokomotiv Moscow | 2016–17 | Russian Premier League | 24 | 5 | — | | 4 | 1 | — | | — | | — | | 28 | 6 |
| Lokomotiv Moscow | Total | | 158 | 23 | — | | 14 | 2 | — | | 20 | 5 | 1 | 0 | 193 | 30 |
| Antalyaspor | 2017–18 | Süper Lig | 30 | 5 | — | | 2 | 0 | — | | — | | — | | 32 | 5 |
| Antalyaspor | 2018–19 | Süper Lig | 14 | 1 | — | | — | | — | | — | | — | | 14 | 1 |
| Antalyaspor | Total | | 44 | 6 | — | | 2 | 0 | — | | — | | — | | 46 | 6 |
| Atlético Mineiro | 2019 | Série A | 10 | 0 | 7 | 1 | 0 | 0 | — | | 10 (Note: Seven appearances, one goal in Copa Libertadores; three appearances in Copa Sudamericana) | 1 | — | | 27 | 2 |
| Atlético Mineiro | 2020 | Série A | — | | 1 | 0 | — | | — | | — | | — | | 1 | 0 |
| Atlético Mineiro | Total | | 10 | 0 | 8 | 1 | 0 | 0 | — | | 10 | 1 | — | | 28 | 2 |
| Buriram United | 2020–21 | Thai League 1 | 15 | 8 | — | | 3 | 0 | — | | — | | — | | 18 | 8 |
| Buriram United | 2021–22 | Thai League 1 | 11 | 0 | — | | 6 | 4 | 5 | 1 | 1 (Note: Appearance(s) in AFC Champions League) | 0 | — | | 23 | 5 |
| Buriram United | Total | | 26 | 8 | — | | 9 | 4 | 5 | 1 | 1 | 0 | — | | 41 | 13 |
| Career total | | | 272 | 39 | 33 | 5 | 25 | 6 | 5 | 1 | 36 | 6 | 1 | 0 | 375 | 57 |

== Honours ==
Lokomotiv Moscow

- Russian Cup: 2014–15, 2016–17

Buriram United

- Thai League 1: 2021–22
- Thai FA Cup: 2021–22
- Thai League Cup: 2021–22

Brazil U20

- FIFA U-20 World Cup runner-up: 2009
