= Olga Smorodskaya =

Russian sports executive

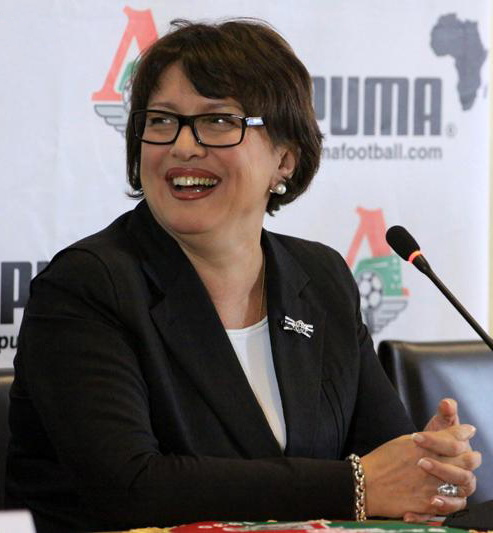
Olga Smorodskaya

Olga Yuryevna Smorodskaya (Russian: Ольга Юрьевна Смородская; born 7 November 1956 in Gomel) is a Russian sports executive. Since 4 August 2010, she worked as the president of FC Lokomotiv Moscow. She resigned as Lokomotiv president on 10 August 2016.

== Personal life ==
She is married and has two children named Anna and Lyudmila.
