= Georgi Burnash =

Russian professional football player

Personal information
- Full name: Georgi Vladimirovich Burnash
- Date of birth: 8 August 1993 (age 33)
- Place of birth: Moscow, Russia
- Height: 1.79 m (5 ft 10 1/2 in)
- Position: Right back

Youth career
- SDYuSShOR-63 Smena Moscow
- Lokomotiv Moscow

Senior career*
Years	Team	Apps	(Gls)
2011–2012	Lokomotiv Moscow	0	(0)
2013–2014	Lokomotiv-2 Moscow	25	(0)
2014–2015	Khimki	18	(0)
2015–2017	Fakel Voronezh	51	(0)
2018–2019	Avangard Kursk	5	(0)
2019	Tyumen	16	(2)
2020	Aktobe	10	(0)

International career
2011	Russia U-20	7	(1)
2012	Russia U-19	3	(0)
2013	Russia U-20	3	(0)
2012	Russia U-21	5	(0)
- * Club domestic league appearances and goals

Georgi Vladimirovich Burnash (Russian: Георгий Владимирович Бурнаш; born 8 August 1993) is a Russian former professional football player.

== Club career ==
He played for FC Lokomotiv Moscow in the 2012–13 Russian Cup game against FC Torpedo Armavir on 26 September 2012.

He made his Russian Football National League debut for FC Fakel Voronezh on 23 August 2015 in a game against FC Luch-Energiya Vladivostok.
