= Renat Yanbayev =

Russian association footballer (born 1984)

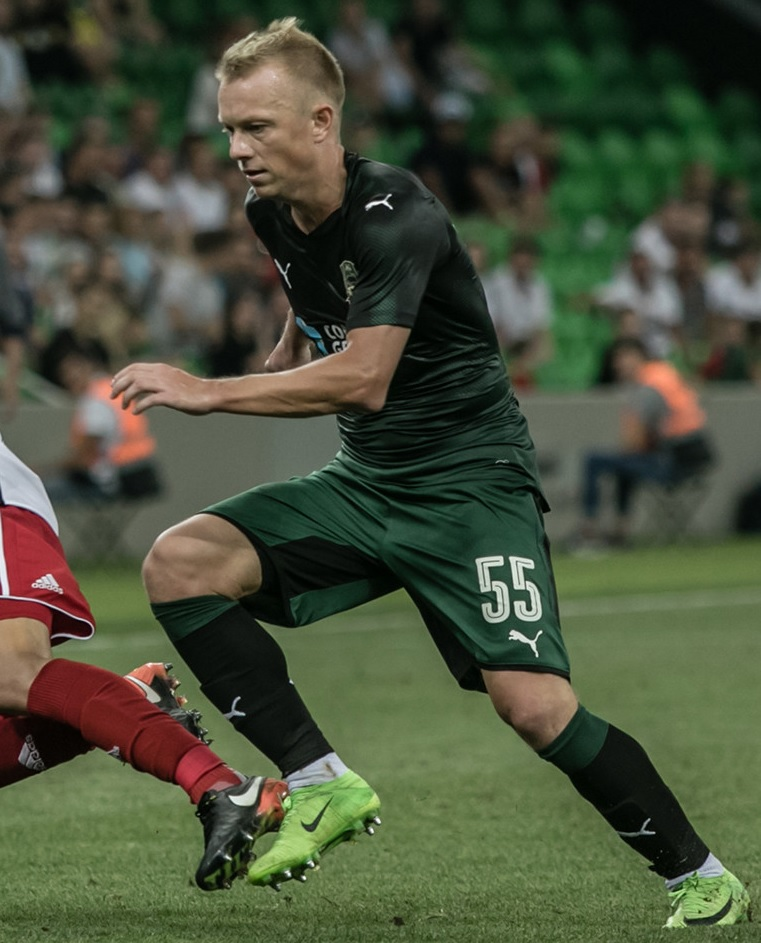
- Yanbayev with Krasnodar in 2017

Personal information
- Full name: Renat Rudolfovich Yanbayev
- Date of birth: 7 April 1984 (age 42)
- Place of birth: Noginsk, USSR (now Russia)
- Height: 1.78 m (5 ft 10 in)
- Position: Left back

Team information
- Current team: Krasnoye Znamya Noginsk (director of sports)

Youth career
- 1994–2002: CSKA Moscow

Senior career*
Years	Team	Apps	(Gls)
2001–2004	CSKA Moscow	0	(0)
2003	→ Anzhi Makhachkala (loan)	20	(1)
2005	Khimki	20	(0)
2006–2007	Kuban Krasnodar	54	(5)
2007–2017	Lokomotiv Moscow	206	(1)
2012	→ Zenit (loan)	11	(1)
2017–2018	Krasnodar	1	(0)
2019–2020	Znamya Noginsk (amateur)		
2020–2023	Znamya Noginsk	53	(1)

International career
2003	Russia U-19	7	(1)
2005	Russia U-21	4	(0)
2008–2012	Russia	12	(0)

Managerial career
- 2023–: Krasnoye Znamya Noginsk (director of sports)
- * Club domestic league appearances and goals

Renat Rudolfovich Yanbayev (Russian: Ренат Рудольфович Янбаев, Tatar: Ренат Рудольф улы Янбаев; born 7 April 1984) is a Russian association football official and a former full-back (mostly left). He is the director of sports for Krasnoye Znamya Noginsk. He was born to an ethnic Russian mother and Volga Tatar father.

== Career ==
Yanbayev played for CSKA Moscow school and youth teams. He moved to Lokomotiv Moscow during the summer of 2007 from FC Kuban Krasnodar after featuring in 12 league games and scoring once in the 2007 Russian Premier League. Originally a left-sided midfielder, he was converted to left-back (he also can play as a right-back) in Lokomotiv Moscow. Playing for Lokomotiv Moscow, Yanbayev was called to Russian national team. In the beginning of the 2012–13 season, after the appointment of Slaven Bilić as a manager, Yanbayev lost his position in the starting XI to Andrey Yeshchenko. To gain playing time, he moved on loan to Zenit in September 2012. During winter transfer window in January 2013, when Yeshchenko departed for Anzhi, Yanbayev returned to Loko.

He left Lokomotiv as a free agent on 5 June 2017 after 10 seasons with the club. On 13 June 2017, he signed a two-year contract with FC Krasnodar. He was released from his Krasnodar contract by mutual consent on 24 July 2018.

=== International ===
In February 2008, he was called up to the Russia national football team.

== Career statistics ==
=== Club ===
As of 13 May 2018

Club	Season	League			Cup		Continental		Other		Total	
Club	Season	Division	Apps	Goals	Apps	Goals	Apps	Goals	Apps	Goals	Apps	Goals
PFC CSKA Moscow	2001	Russian Premier League	0	0	0	0	–		–		0	0
PFC CSKA Moscow	2002	Russian Premier League	0	0	0	0	0	0	–		0	0
FC Anzhi Makhachkala	2003	FNL	20	1	4	0	–		–		24	1
PFC CSKA Moscow	2004	Russian Premier League	0	0	0	0	0	0	–		0	0
PFC CSKA Moscow	Total (2 spells)		0	0	0	0	0	0	0	0	0	0
FC Khimki	2005	FNL	20	0	2	0	–		–		22	0
FC Kuban Krasnodar	2006	FNL	42	4	1	0	–		–		43	4
FC Kuban Krasnodar	2007	Russian Premier League	12	1	0	0	–		–		12	1
FC Kuban Krasnodar	Total		54	5	1	0	0	0	0	0	55	5
FC Lokomotiv Moscow	2007	Russian Premier League	12	0	0	0	4	0	–		16	0
FC Lokomotiv Moscow	2008	Russian Premier League	27	0	2	0	–		1 (Note: One appearance in the Russian Super Cup)	0	30	0
FC Lokomotiv Moscow	2009	Russian Premier League	30	0	1	0	–		–		31	0
FC Lokomotiv Moscow	2010	Russian Premier League	30	0	0	0	2	0	–		32	0
FC Lokomotiv Moscow	2011–12	Russian Premier League	35	0	2	0	8	1	–		45	1
FC Zenit Saint Petersburg	2012–13	Russian Premier League	11	1	2	0	0	0	–		13	1
FC Lokomotiv Moscow	2012–13	Russian Premier League	11	1	–		–		–		11	1
FC Lokomotiv Moscow	2013–14	Russian Premier League	19	0	1	0	–		–		20	0
FC Lokomotiv Moscow	2014–15	Russian Premier League	16	0	1	0	0	0	–		17	0
FC Lokomotiv Moscow	2015–16	Russian Premier League	10	0	2	0	3	0	–		15	0
FC Lokomotiv Moscow	2016–17	Russian Premier League	16	0	3	0	–		–		19	0
FC Lokomotiv Moscow	Total (2 spells)		206	1	12	0	17	1	1	0	236	2
FC Krasnodar	2017–18	Russian Premier League	1	0	1	0	1	0	–		3	0
Career total			312	8	22	0	18	1	1	0	353	9

== Honours ==
=== Club ===
Lokomotiv Moscow

- Russian Cup: 2014–15, 2016–17

=== International ===
- UEFA European Football Championship bronze medalist: 1
  - 2008, Russian Federation
