= 2020 Russian Super Cup =

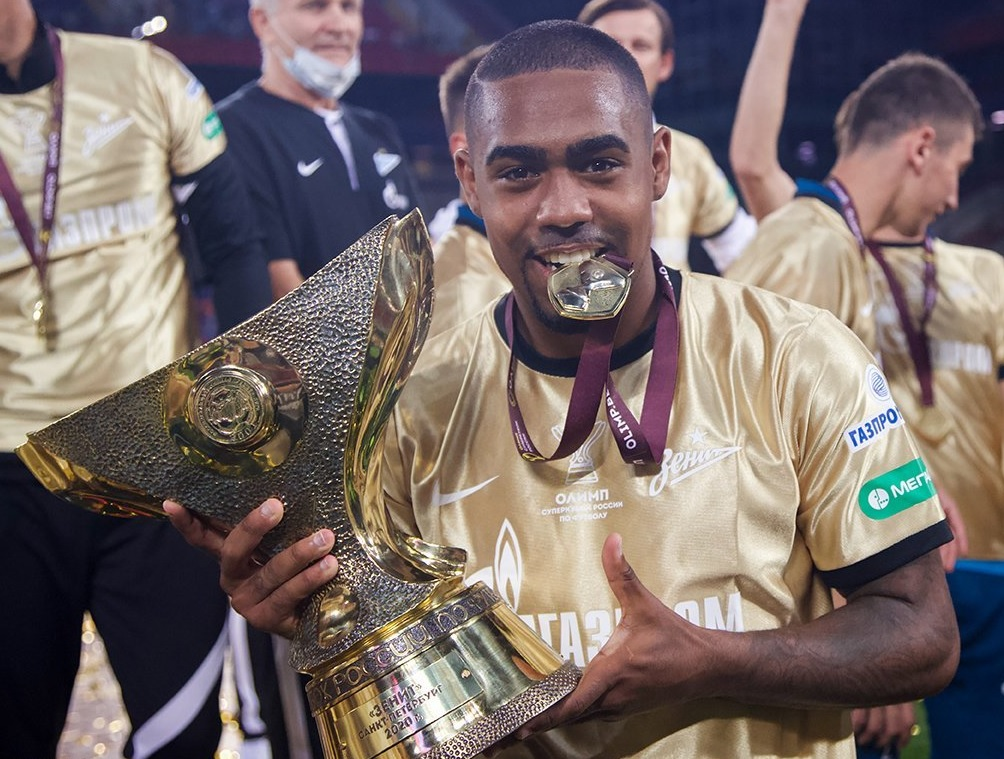
- Malcom celebrating with the cup
- Event: Russian Super Cup
Zenit Saint Petersburg	Lokomotiv Moscow
2	1
- Date: 7 August 2020
- Venue: VEB Arena, Moscow
- Referee: Mikhail Vilkov
- Attendance: 5,942

The 2020 Russian Super Cup (Russian: Суперкубок России) was the 18th annual Russian Super Cup match which was contested between 2019–20 Premier League champions and Cup winners Zenit Saint Petersburg against the Premier League runners-up, Lokomotiv Moscow. The final was played at VEB Arena. Attendance was limited due to the COVID-19 pandemic in Russia.

Lokomotiv Moscow were the defending champions.

== Match details ==
7 August 2020
19:00 MSK (UTC+3)

Zenit Saint Petersburg	2–1	Lokomotiv Moscow
Dzyuba 14'; Ozdoyev 69'	Report	Ćorluka 72'

VEB Arena, Moscow
Attendance: 5,942
Referee: Mikhail Vilkov (Nizhny Novgorod)

GK	41	(Russia) Mikhail Kerzhakov
DF	15	(Russia) Vyacheslav Karavayev
DF	44	(Ukraine) Yaroslav Rakitskiy
DF	3	(Brazil) Douglas Santos
DF	6	(Croatia) Dejan Lovren
MF	27	(Russia) Magomed Ozdoyev (yellow card) 67'	(substituted off) 88'
MF	5	(Colombia) Wílmar Barrios
FW	22	(Russia) Artem Dzyuba (c)		(substituted off) 81'
FW	7	(Iran) Sardar Azmoun	(yellow card) 90+'	(substituted off) 90+'
FW	11	(Argentina) Sebastián Driussi	(yellow card) 59'	(substituted off) 88'
FW	8	(Brazil) Malcom		(substituted off) 81'
Substitutes:
GK	78	(Russia) Aleksandr Vasyutin
GK	71	(Russia) Daniil Odoyevskiy
DF	4	(Russia) Danil Krugovoy
DF	87	(Russia) Danila Prokhin
MF	18	(Russia) Yuri Zhirkov	(yellow card) 85'	(substituted in) 81'
MF	21	(Russia) Aleksandr Yerokhin		(substituted in) 88'
MF	17	(Russia) Andrei Mostovoy		(substituted in) 81'
MF	38	(Russia) Leon Musayev		(substituted in) 88'
FW	10	(Argentina) Emiliano Rigoni		(substituted in) 90+'
Manager:
(Russia) Sergei Semak

GK	1	(Russia) Guilherme
DF	20	(Russia) Vladislav Ignatyev
DF	31	(Poland) Maciej Rybus	(yellow card) 19'
DF	14	(Croatia) Vedran Ćorluka (c)
DF	27	(Brazil) Murilo
MF	6	(Russia) Dmitri Barinov	(yellow card) 73'
MF	59	(Russia) Aleksei Miranchuk	(yellow card) 64'
MF	11	(Russia) Anton Miranchuk	(yellow card) 79'	(substituted off) 81'
MF	37	(Russia) Stanislav Magkeyev	(yellow card) 47'	(substituted off) 69'
MF	7	(Poland) Grzegorz Krychowiak
FW	19	(Portugal) Eder		(substituted off) 62'
Substitutes:
GK	77	(Russia) Anton Kochenkov
GK	60	(Russia) Andrey Savin
DF	2	(Russia) Dmitri Zhivoglyadov
DF	5	(Georgia (country)) Solomon Kvirkvelia
DF	74	(Russia) Artur Chyorny
DF	45	(Russia) Aleksandr Silyanov
MF	17	(Russia) Rifat Zhemaletdinov		(substituted in) 69'
MF	94	(Russia) Dmitri Rybchinsky		(substituted in) 81'
MF	69	(Russia) Daniil Kulikov
MF	68	(Russia) Nikita Iosifov
FW	9	(Russia) Fyodor Smolov		(substituted in) 62'
FW	92	(Russia) Mikhail Ageyev
Manager:
(Serbia) Marko Nikolić

MATCH OFFICIALS

Assistant referees:
Roman Usachyov
Aleksei Vorontsov
Fourth official:
Pavel Kukuyan
Video assistant referee:
Vitali Meshkov
