= 2020–21 FC Lokomotiv Moscow season =

FC Lokomotiv Moscow
2020–21 season
- Owner: Russian Railways
- President: Vasili Kiknadze
- Head coach: Marko Nikolić
- Stadium: RZD Arena
- Premier League: 3rd
- Russian Cup: Winners
- Super Cup: Runners-up
- UEFA Champions League: Group stage
- Top goalscorer: League: Grzegorz Krychowiak (9); All: Grzegorz Krychowiak; Fyodor Smolov (11 each)
Home colours	Away colours	Third colours

The 2020–21 FC Lokomotiv Moscow season was the club's 96th season in existence and the club's 25th consecutive season in the top flight of Russian football. In addition to the domestic league, Lokomotiv Moscow participated in this season's editions of the Russian Cup, the Russian Super Cup, and participated in the UEFA Champions League. The season covered the period from 7 August 2020 to 30 June 2021.

== Players ==
=== First team squad ===
As of 19 January 2021

Note: Flags indicate national team as defined under FIFA eligibility rules; some limited exceptions apply. Players may hold more than one non-FIFA nationality.

No.	Pos.	Nation	Player
1	GK	RUS	Guilherme
2	DF	RUS	Dmitri Zhivoglyadov
3	DF	BRA	Pablo
4	DF	RUS	Vitali Lystsov
6	MF	RUS	Dmitri Barinov
7	MF	POL	Grzegorz Krychowiak
9	FW	RUS	Fyodor Smolov
11	MF	RUS	Anton Miranchuk
14	DF	CRO	Vedran Ćorluka (captain)
17	FW	RUS	Rifat Zhemaletdinov
19	FW	POR	Eder
20	DF	RUS	Vladislav Ignatyev

No.	Pos.	Nation	Player
25	FW	GUI	François Kamano
27	DF	BRA	Murilo Cerqueira
29	FW	CPV	Zé Luís
31	MF	POL	Maciej Rybus
37	MF	RUS	Stanislav Magkeyev
60	GK	RUS	Andrey Savin
69	MF	RUS	Daniil Kulikov
76	MF	RUS	Maksim Mukhin
77	GK	RUS	Anton Kochenkov
84	DF	RUS	Mikhail Lysov
88	FW	BLR	Vitaly Lisakovich
94	MF	RUS	Dmitri Rybchinsky

=== Out on loan ===
Note: Flags indicate national team as defined under FIFA eligibility rules; some limited exceptions apply. Players may hold more than one non-FIFA nationality.

No.	Pos.	Nation	Player
—	DF	NGR	Brian Idowu (at Khimki until 30 June 2021)
—	DF	GEO	Solomon Kvirkvelia (at Rotor Volgograd until 30 June 2021)
—	MF	RUS	Ilya Berkovski (at Nizhny Novgorod until 30 June 2021)
—	MF	RUS	Denis Faizullin (at Tom Tomsk until 30 June 2021)

No.	Pos.	Nation	Player
—	MF	RUS	Aleksei Mironov (at Orenburg until 30 June 2021)
—	MF	RUS	Andrey Nikitin (at Fakel Voronezh until 30 June 2021)
—	FW	MNE	Luka Đorđević (at Arsenal Tula until 30 June 2021)
—	FW	RUS	Timur Suleymanov (at Nizhny Novgorod until 30 June 2021)

== Transfers ==
=== In ===
No.	Pos	Player	Transferred from	Fee	Date	Source
15			TBD		1 July 2020	

=== Out ===
No.	Pos	Player	Transferred to	Fee	Date	Source
15			TBD		1 July 2020	

== Pre-season and friendlies ==
Win Draw Loss

23 January 2021 Friendly	Lokomotiv Moscow (Russia)	4–1	(Spain) Vélez	Marbella, Spain
16:30 CET (UTC+1)				Stadium: Marbella Football Center

27 January 2021 Friendly	Lokomotiv Moscow (Russia)	3–1	(Sweden) Östersunds	Marbella, Spain
15:30 CET (UTC+1)				Stadium: Marbella Football Center

4 February 2021 Friendly	Lokomotiv Moscow (Russia)	1–1	(Russia) Krasnodar	Marbella, Spain
16:30 CET (UTC+1)	Ageyev 74'		Khalnazar 12'	Stadium: Marbella Football Center

5 February 2021 Friendly	Lokomotiv Moscow (Russia)	4–0	(Sweden) Östersunds	Marbella, Spain
14:00 CET (UTC+1)	Kamano 25', 28'; Zhemaletdinov 36'; Eder 44'			Stadium: Marbella Football Center

11 February 2021 Friendly	Lokomotiv Moscow (Russia)	4–0	(Russia) Krasnodar	Marbella, Spain
14:30 CET (UTC+1)	Zhemaletdinov 3'; Lisakovich 14'; Krychowiak (yellow card) 27'; Kamano (yellow card) 28'; Ignatyev 32', 41'			Stadium: Marbella Football Center; Referee: Alejandro Hernández Hernández

== Competitions ==
=== Overview ===
Competition	First match	Last match	Starting round	Final position	Record							
Competition	First match	Last match	Starting round	Final position	Pld	W	D	L	GF	GA	GD	Win %
Russian Premier League	11 August 2020	16 May 2021	Matchday 1	3rd	30	17	5	8	45	35	+10	56.67
Russian Cup	21 February 2021	12 May 2021	Round of 16	Winners	4	4	0	0	12	2	+10	100.00
Russian Super Cup	7 August 2020		Final	Runners-up	1	0	0	1	1	2	−1	0.00
Champions League	21 October 2020	9 December 2020	Group stage	Group stage	6	0	3	3	5	10	−5	0.00
Total					41	21	8	12	63	49	+14	51.22

Last updated: 16 May 2021
Source: Soccerway

=== Premier League ===
==== League table ====
Pos	Team	Pld	W	D	L	GF	GA	GD	Pts	Qualification or relegation
1	Zenit Saint Petersburg (C)	30	19	8	3	76	26	+50	65	Qualification for the Champions League group stage
2	Spartak Moscow	30	17	6	7	56	37	+19	57	Qualification for the Champions League third qualifying round
3	Lokomotiv Moscow	30	17	5	8	45	35	+10	56	Qualification for the Europa League group stage (Note: FC Lokomotiv Moscow qualified for the Europa League group stage by winning the 2020–21 Russian Cup. The Europa Conference League spot awarded to the third-placed team is passed to fourth-placed team, and the spot awarded to the fourth-placed team is passed to fifth-placed team.)
4	Rubin Kazan	30	16	5	9	42	33	+9	53 (Note: Head-to-head points: Rubin 3, Sochi 3. Overall matches won: Rubin 16, Sochi 15.)	Qualification for the Europa Conference League third qualifying round
5	Sochi	30	15	8	7	49	33	+16	53	Qualification for the Europa Conference League second qualifying round

Source: Premier Liga
Rules for classification: 1) Points; 2) Head-to-head points; 3) Head-to-head matches won; 4) Head-to-head goal difference; 5) Head-to-head goals scored; 6) Matches won; 7) Goal difference; 8) Goals scored; 9) Play-off.
(C) Champions

==== Results summary ====
Overall								Home						Away					
Pld	W	D	L	GF	GA	GD	Pts	W	D	L	GF	GA	GD	W	D	L	GF	GA	GD
30	17	5	8	45	35	+10	56	11	2	2	24	9	+15	6	3	6	21	26	−5

Last updated: 16 May 2021.
Source: Premier Liga

==== Results by round ====
Round	1	2	3	4	5	6	7	8	9	10	11	12	13	14	15	16	17	18	19	20	21	22	23	24	25	26	27	28	29	30
Ground	A	H	A	A	H	H	A	H	A	H	H	H	A	A	H	A	H	A	A	H	A	H	A	A	H	H	A	A	H	H
Result	W	W	D	L	L	D	D	W	W	W	W	L	L	L	W	D	W	L	L	W	W	W	W	W	W	W	W	L	D	W
Position	3	3	3	4	7	8	7	6	6	5	4	4	7	8	8	7	6	7	8	7	6	4	3	3	3	2	2	3	3	3

Updated to match(es) played on 16 May 2021. Source: Premier Liga
A = Away; H = Home; W = Win; D = Draw; L = Loss

==== Matches ====
11 August 2020 1	Rubin Kazan	0–2	Lokomotiv Moscow	Kazan
20:00 MSK (UTC+3)	Ignatyev (yellow card) 50'; Begić (red card) 65'; Uremović (yellow card) 65'; Makarov (yellow card) 85'	Report	Al. Miranchuk 2'; Barinov 26', (yellow card) 78'; Rybchinsky (yellow card) 48'; Zhivoglyadov (yellow card) 59'; Magkeyev (yellow card) 88'; Iosifov (yellow card) 90+2'	Stadium: Ak Bars Arena; Attendance: 4,477; Referee: Sergey Ivanov

15 August 2020 2	Lokomotiv Moscow	1–0	Krasnodar	Moscow
19:00 MSK (UTC+3)	Al. Miranchuk 43'; Guilherme (yellow card) 85'	Report	Ramírez (yellow card) 9'	Stadium: RZD Arena; Attendance: 6,247; Referee: Kirill Levnikov

19 August 2020 3	Ural Yekaterinburg	1–1	Lokomotiv Moscow	Yekaterinburg
18:00 MSK (UTC+3)	Podberyozkin (yellow card) 29'; Panyukov (yellow card) 30'; Bicfalvi (yellow card) 49'; Yegorychev 74'; Pomazun (yellow card) 90+2'	Report	Barinov (yellow card) 29'; Rybus (yellow card) 81'; Smolov 87'	Stadium: Central Stadium; Attendance: 5,072; Referee: Aleksei Matyunin

23 August 2020 4	Spartak Moscow	2–1	Lokomotiv Moscow	Moscow
19:00 MSK (UTC+3)	Larsson 53'; Sobolev 81'; Umyarov (yellow card) 86'	Report	Barinov (yellow card) 7'; Cerqueira 10'; Rybus (yellow card) 42'; Krychowiak (yellow card) 44'; Ćorluka (yellow card) 69'; Rybchinsky (yellow card) 80'; Guilherme (yellow card) 90+4'	Stadium: Otkritie Arena; Attendance: 12,393; Referee: Sergei Karasev

26 August 2020 5	Lokomotiv Moscow	2–3	Akhmat Grozny	Moscow
18:30 MSK (UTC+3)	Ignatyev (yellow card) 24'; Zhemaletdinov (yellow card) 34'; An. Miranchuk 48' (pen.); Eder (yellow card) 70'; Krychowiak 77'; Cerqueira (yellow card) 90+4'; Kulikov (yellow card) 90+4'	Report	Ilyin 3', (yellow card) 90'; Nenakhov (yellow card) 25'; Timofeyev (yellow card) 32', (goal) 45+1'; Bystrov (yellow card) 39' (yellow-red card) 62'; Berisha 58', (yellow card) 60'; Semyonov (yellow card) 71'; Ivanov (yellow card) 90+1'; Shvets (yellow card) 90+2' (red card) 90+2'	Stadium: RZD Arena; Attendance: 4,859; Referee: Igor Panin

30 August 2020 6	Lokomotiv Moscow	0–0	Zenit Saint Petersburg	Moscow
16:00 MSK (UTC+3)	Rybus (yellow card) 26'; Ćorluka (yellow card) 85'; Zhemaletdinov (yellow card) 87'	Report		Stadium: RZD Arena; Attendance: 7,739; Referee: Vladimir Moskalyov

14 September 2020 7	Rostov	0–0	Lokomotiv Moscow	Rostov-on-Don
20:30 MSK (UTC+3)	Ionov (yellow card) 77'	Report	Krychowiak (yellow card) 73'; Ignatyev (yellow card) 90+3'	Stadium: Rostov Arena; Attendance: 15,011; Referee: Vladislav Bezborodov

20 September 2020 8	Lokomotiv Moscow	1–0	Tambov	Moscow
19:00 MSK (UTC+3)	Smolov 7'; Krychowiak (yellow card) 47'; Eder (yellow card) 55'; Zhivoglyadov (yellow card) 61'; Magkeyev (yellow card) 67'; Zhemaletdinov (yellow card) 86'	Report	Shlyakov (yellow card) 41'; Ryzhikov (yellow card) 65'	Stadium: RZD Arena; Attendance: 6,508; Referee: Evgeny Turbin

27 September 2020 9	CSKA Moscow	0–1	Lokomotiv Moscow	Moscow
19:00 MSK (UTC+3)	Bistrović (yellow card) 8' (yellow-red card) 60'	Report	Smolov 45'; Eder (yellow card) 70'; Guilherme (yellow card) 85'	Stadium: VEB Arena; Attendance: 12,400; Referee: Mikhail Vilkov

4 October 2020 10	Lokomotiv Moscow	2–1	Khimki	Moscow
14:00 MSK (UTC+3)	Lisakovich 25'; Ignatyev 55'	Report	Danilkin (yellow card) 9'; Gapon (yellow card) 45'; Bozhenov 46'; Tikhiy (yellow card) 90'; Glushakov (yellow card) 90'	Stadium: RZD Arena; Attendance: 7,920; Referee: Evgeniy Kukulyak

17 October 2020 11	Lokomotiv Moscow	1–0	Ufa	Moscow
16:30 MSK (UTC+3)	Zhemaletdinov (yellow card) 17'; Krychowiak 67'; Zhivoglyadov (yellow card) 90+'	Report	Tabidze (yellow card) 90'	Stadium: RZD Arena; Attendance: 4,471; Referee: Pavel Kukuyan

24 October 2020 12	Lokomotiv Moscow	1–2	Rotor Volgograd	Moscow
20:00 MSK (UTC+3)	Krychowiak (yellow card) 15' (yellow-red card) 90+5'; Rybchinsky 28'; Ćorluka (yellow card) 70'	Report	Flamarion 18'; Ponce 57'; Čondrić (yellow card) 90+7'; Stepanov (yellow card) 90+8'; Mikeltadze (yellow card) 90+9'	Stadium: RZD Arena; Attendance: 4,300; Referee: Sergey Ivanov

31 October 2020 13	Sochi	2–1	Lokomotiv Moscow	Sochi
19:00 MSK (UTC+3)	A. Zabolotny 14'; Burmistrov 40'; Mevlja (yellow card) 55'; Miladinović (yellow card) 70'; Dzhanayev (yellow card) 73'; Terekhov (yellow card) 78'	Report	Eder (yellow card) 16'; Rybus (yellow card) 27'; An. Miranchuk 65'; Kulikov (yellow card) 73'; Murilo (yellow card) 73'	Stadium: Fisht Olympic Stadium; Referee: Stanislav Vasiliev

8 November 2020 14	Dynamo Moscow	5–1	Lokomotiv Moscow	Moscow
19:00 MSK (UTC+3)	Yevgenyev 3'; Pliyev (yellow card) 24'; Szymański (yellow card) 28'; N'Jie 33'; Parshivlyuk (yellow card) 54' (yellow-red card) 78'; Lesovoy 60'; Fomin 86' (pen.); Rausch 90+'	Report	Kulikov (yellow card) 35'; Rajković (yellow card) 37' (yellow-red card) 38'; Guilherme (yellow card) 39' (red card) 64'; Zé Luís 45+', (yellow card) 84'; Magkeyev (yellow card) 84'	Stadium: VTB Arena; Attendance: 6,158; Referee: Igor Panin

21 November 2020 15	Lokomotiv Moscow	1–0	Arsenal Tula	Moscow
19:00 MSK (UTC+3)	Krychowiak (yellow card) 8'; Ćorluka (yellow card) 21' (yellow-red card) 45+'; An. Miranchuk 72' (pen.)	Report	Panchenko (yellow card) 37'; Čaušić (yellow card) 52'; Kostadinov (yellow card) 75'	Stadium: RZD Arena; Attendance: 3,976; Referee: Alexey Sukhoi

28 November 2020 16	Akhmat Grozny	0–0	Lokomotiv Moscow	Grozny
19:00 MSK (UTC+3)	Melkadze (yellow card) 43'; Nenakhov (yellow card) 61'	Report	Magkeyev (yellow card) 10'; Murilo (yellow card) 45'; Kulikov (yellow card) 67'	Stadium: Akhmat-Arena; Attendance: 5,093; Referee: Kirill Levnikov

5 December 2020 17	Lokomotiv Moscow	3–1	Rubin Kazan	Moscow
14:00 MSK (UTC+3)	Mukhin (yellow card) 5'; Ignatyev 17', 86'; Krychowiak (yellow card) 36'; An. Miranchuk 69' (pen.); Murilo (yellow card) 74'; Lisakovich (yellow card) 80'	Report	Hwang 3'; Ignatyev (yellow card) 23' (yellow-red card) 47'; Zuyev (yellow card) 26'; Zotov (yellow card) 29'; Medvedev (yellow card) 69'	Stadium: RZD Arena; Attendance: 3,768; Referee: Sergei Karasev

13 December 2020 18	Krasnodar	5–0	Lokomotiv Moscow	Krasnodar
16:30 MSK (UTC+3)	Claesson 5', (yellow card) 59'; Cabella 11'; Sorokin (yellow card) 52'; Berg 75', 84'; Suleymanov 80'; Olsson (yellow card) 90+1'	Report	Rajković (yellow card) 38'; An. Miranchuk (penalty missed) 44'; Rybus (yellow card) 70'; Ćorluka (yellow card) 78'	Stadium: Krasnodar Stadium; Attendance: 9,033; Referee: Vladimir Moskalyov

17 December 2020 19	Khimki	3–2	Lokomotiv Moscow	Khimki
18:00 MSK (UTC+3)	Koryan 26' (pen.), (yellow card) 44'; Kukharchuk 85'; Dolgov 90+3'	Report	Krychowiak 15'; Murilo 37'; Kulikov (yellow card) 57'; Rajković (yellow card) 83'	Stadium: Arena Khimki; Attendance: 831; Referee: Aleksei Matyunin

27 February 2021 20	Lokomotiv Moscow	2–0	CSKA Moscow	Moscow
19:00 MSK (UTC+3)	Lisakovich 6'; Krychowiak 41'; Rybus (yellow card) 90+2'	Report	Vlašić (penalty missed) 73'	Stadium: RZD Arena; Attendance: 8,932; Referee: Pavel Kukuyan

8 March 2021 21	Arsenal Tula	0–3	Lokomotiv Moscow	Tula
14:00 MSK (UTC+3)	Tkachyov (yellow card) 49'; Bauer (yellow card) 63'; Đorđević (yellow card) 84'	Report	Rybchinsky (yellow card) 8'; Mukhin (yellow card) 40'; Kulikov (yellow card) 52'; Smolov 71'; Murilo 75'; Rybus (yellow card) 78'; Zhemaletdinov 85'	Stadium: Arsenal Stadium; Attendance: 7,951; Referee: Kirill Levnikov

14 March 2021 22	Lokomotiv Moscow	3–1	Sochi	Moscow
19:00 MSK (UTC+3)	Rybchinsky (yellow card) 7'; Kamano 42', 56'; Zhemaletdinov (yellow card) 83'; Smolov 88'	Report	Prutsev (yellow card) 45+1'; Yusupov 58'; Miladinović (yellow card) 90+2'	Stadium: RZD Arena; Attendance: 6,839; Referee: Aleksei Matyunin

18 March 2021 23	Ufa	0–1	Lokomotiv Moscow	Ufa
17:00 MSK (UTC+3)	Jokić (yellow card) 17'; Pliyev (yellow card) 77'	Report	Lisakovich (yellow card) 53'; Smolov (yellow card) 63'; Krychowiak 80'; Eder (yellow card) 86'	Stadium: Neftyanik Stadium; Attendance: 5,180; Referee: Stanislav Vasiliev

3 April 2021 24	Rotor Volgograd	0–2	Lokomotiv Moscow	Volgograd
14:00 MSK (UTC+3)	Gogoua (yellow card) 35'; Pesegov (yellow card) 68'; Makarov (yellow card) 71'	Report	Krychowiak (yellow card) 15', (goal) 21'; Barinov (yellow card) 49'; Mukhin (yellow card) 52'; Rybchinsky (yellow card) 61'; Rybus (yellow card) 69'; Zhemaletdinov 80'	Stadium: Volgograd Arena; Attendance: 14,115; Referee: Igor Panin

11 April 2021 25	Lokomotiv Moscow	2–0	Spartak Moscow	Moscow
19:00 MSK (UTC+3)	Kamano 22', (yellow card) 76'; Smolov 45+1'; Barinov (yellow card) 55'; Mukhin (yellow card) 58'; Guilherme (yellow card) 74'; Zhemaletdinov (yellow card) 84'; Zhivoglyadov (yellow card) 85'	Report	Sobolev (yellow card) 23'; Ayrton (red card) 45'; Dzhikiya (yellow card) 76'; Maslov (yellow card) 85'	Stadium: RZD Arena; Attendance: 11,902; Referee: Kirill Levnikov

17 April 2021 26	Lokomotiv Moscow	4–1	Rostov	Moscow
16:30 MSK (UTC+3)	Kamano 4'; Zhemaletdinov 6'; Magkeyev (yellow card) 12'; Krychowiak 65' (pen.); Eder 90'	Report	Hashimoto (yellow card) 8'; Gigović (yellow card) 17' (yellow-red card) 52'; Hadžikadunić 33'	Stadium: RZD Arena; Attendance: 10,317; Referee: Mikhail Vilkov

24 April 2021 27	Tambov	2–5	Lokomotiv Moscow	Saransk
19:00 MSK (UTC+3)	Aliyev 45+2'; Bavin (yellow card) 49', (penalty missed) 77'; Arkhipov (yellow card) 75'; Kaykov 78'	Report	Magkeyev (yellow card) 26'; Krychowiak 40', 60'; Smolov 47'; Murilo 74'; Rybus 80'	Stadium: Mordovia Arena; Attendance: 4,921; Referee: Pavel Shadykhanov

2 May 2021 28	Zenit Saint Petersburg	6–1	Lokomotiv Moscow	Saint Petersburg
19:00 MSK (UTC+3)	Dzyuba 19', 51'; Rakitskiy (yellow card) 36'; Azmoun 39', 45+3' (pen.), 46'; Malcom 67'; Kuzyayev (yellow card) 69'	Report	Krychowiak (yellow card) 22'; Mukhin (yellow card) 38'; Pablo (yellow card) 45+1'; Kamano 56'; Miranchuk (yellow card) 61'; Rybchinsky (yellow card) 87'	Stadium: Krestovsky Stadium; Attendance: 39,793; Referee: Sergei Karasev

8 May 2021 29	Lokomotiv Moscow	0–0	Dynamo Moscow	Moscow
16:30 MSK (UTC+3)	Zhemaletdinov (yellow card) 27'; Zhivoglyadov (yellow card) 82'	Report	Tyukavin (yellow card) 15'; Zakharyan (yellow card) 18'; Ordets (yellow card) 31' (yellow-red card) 73'	Stadium: RZD Arena; Attendance: 5,100; Referee: Pavel Kukuyan

16 May 2021 30	Lokomotiv Moscow	1–0	Ural Yekaterinburg	Moscow
14:00 MSK (UTC+3)	Guilherme (yellow card) 4'; Zhemaletdinov (yellow card) 45'; Rybchinsky 89'	Report	Adamov (yellow card) 4'; Augustyniak (yellow card) 16' (yellow-red card) 27'; Jovičić (yellow card) 36'; Hodzyur (yellow card) 69'; Miškić (yellow card) 72' (yellow-red card) 75'; Kalinin (yellow card) 76'	Stadium: RZD Arena; Attendance: 11,774; Referee: Vladislav Bezborodov

=== Russian Cup ===
21 February 2021 Round of 16	Lokomotiv Moscow	3–0	Tambov	Moscow
17:00 MSK (UTC+3)	Pablo 27'; Kamano 58'; Krychowiak 82' (pen.)	Report		Stadium: RZD Arena; Attendance: 3,178; Referee: Vladislav Bezborodov

7 April 2021 Quarter-finals	Sochi	1–3	Lokomotiv Moscow	Sochi
19:00 MSK (UTC+3)	Zaika (yellow card) 18' (yellow-red card) 50'; Miladinović (yellow card) 56'; Yusupov 70'	Report	Smolov 44', 63'; Mukhin (yellow card) 53'; Guilherme (yellow card) 62'; Rybus (yellow card) 78'; Kamano 90+6'	Stadium: Fisht Olympic Stadium; Attendance: 8,487; Referee: Vasily Kazartsev

21 April 2021 Semi-finals	Lokomotiv Moscow	3–0	CSKA Moscow	Moscow
19:00 MSK (UTC+3)	Kamano 16'; Smolov 54'; Pablo (yellow card) 63'; Krychowiak (yellow card) 64', (goal) 90+1'; Barinov (yellow card) 66'	Report	Diveyev (yellow card) 90+3'	Stadium: RZD Arena; Attendance: 11,017; Referee: Sergei Karasev

12 May 2021 Final	Lokomotiv Moscow	3–1	Krylia Sovetov	Nizhny Novgorod
20:00 MSK (UTC+3)	Kamano 14', (yellow card) 64'; Smolov 47' (pen.); Pablo (yellow card) 51'; Cerqueira 84'; Rybchinsky (yellow card) 90'; Rybus (yellow card) 90+3'	Report	Yakuba (yellow card) 17'; Sarveli 22'	Stadium: Nizhny Novgorod Stadium; Attendance: 20,808; Referee: Sergey Ivanov

=== Russian Super Cup ===
7 August 2020 Final	Zenit Saint Petersburg	2–1	Lokomotiv Moscow	Moscow
19:00 MSK (UTC+3)	Dzyuba 14'; Driussi (yellow card) 59'; Ozdoyev (yellow card) 67', (goal) 69'; Zhirkov (yellow card) 84'; Azmoun (yellow card) 90+2'	Report	Rybus (yellow card) 19'; Magkeyev (yellow card) 48'; Al. Miranchuk (yellow card) 64'; Ćorluka 72'; Barinov (yellow card) 72'; An. Miranchuk (yellow card) 78'	Stadium: VEB Arena; Attendance: 5,942; Referee: Mikhail Vilkov

=== UEFA Champions League ===
==== Group stage ====
The group stage draw was held on 1 October 2020.

Pos	Team	Pld	W	D	L	GF	GA	GD	Pts	Qualification	BAY	ATM	SAL	LMO
1	(Germany) Bayern Munich	6	5	1	0	18	5	+13	16	Advance to knockout phase	—	4–0	3–1	2–0
2	(Spain) Atlético Madrid	6	2	3	1	7	8	−1	9	Advance to knockout phase	1–1	—	3–2	0–0
3	(Austria) Red Bull Salzburg	6	1	1	4	10	17	−7	4	Transfer to Europa League	2–6	0–2	—	2–2
4	(Russia) Lokomotiv Moscow	6	0	3	3	5	10	−5	3		1–2	1–1	1–3	—

Source: UEFA
Rules for classification: Group stage tiebreakers

21 October 2020 1	Red Bull Salzburg (Austria)	2–2	(Russia) Lokomotiv Moscow	Wals-Siezenheim, Austria
18:55 CEST (UTC+2)	Szoboszlai (yellow card) 41', (goal) 45'; Junuzović 50'	Report	Eder 19'; Lisakovich 75'; Kulikov (yellow card) 80'	Stadium: Red Bull Arena; Attendance: 3,000; Referee: Serdar Gözübüyük (Netherlands)

27 October 2020 2	Lokomotiv Moscow (Russia)	1–2	(Germany) Bayern Munich	Moscow, Russia
18:55 CET (UTC+1)	Zhivoglyadov (yellow card) 17'; Cerqueira (yellow card) 50'; An. Miranchuk 70'; Zhemaletdinov (yellow card) 84'	Report	Goretzka 13'; Hernandez (yellow card) 47'; Kimmich 79'	Stadium: RZD Arena; Attendance: 8,196; Referee: István Kovács (Romania)

3 November 2020 3	Lokomotiv Moscow (Russia)	1–1	(Spain) Atlético Madrid	Moscow, Russia
18:55 CET (UTC+1)	An. Miranchuk 25' (pen.); Murilo (yellow card) 29'; Krychowiak (yellow card) 51'; Rajković (yellow card) 54'; Zhemaletdinov (yellow card) 70'; Ignatyev (yellow card) 83'	Report	Giménez 18'; Suárez (yellow card) 24'; Saúl (yellow card) 44'; Lodi (yellow card) 49'	Stadium: RZD Arena; Attendance: 0 (Note: Due to the COVID-19 pandemic in Europe, the match was played behind closed doors.); Referee: Benoît Bastien (France)

25 November 2020 4	Atlético Madrid (Spain)	0–0	(Russia) Lokomotiv Moscow	Madrid, Spain
21:00 CET (UTC+1)		Report		Stadium: Wanda Metropolitano; Attendance: 0 Referee: Slavko Vinčić (Slovenia)

1 December 2020 5	Lokomotiv Moscow (Russia)	1–3	(Austria) Red Bull Salzburg	Moscow, Russia
18:55 CET (UTC+1)	Mukhin (yellow card) 62'; An. Miranchuk 79' (pen.); Ignatyev (yellow card) 79'; Cerqueira (yellow card) 80'	Report	Berisha 28', 41'; Camara (yellow card) 45+1'; Ramalho (yellow card) 80'; Stankovic (yellow card) 80'; Adeyemi 81'	Stadium: RZD Arena; Referee: Ali Palabıyık (Turkey)

9 December 2020 6	Bayern Munich (Germany)	2–0	(Russia) Lokomotiv Moscow	Munich, Germany
21:00 CET (UTC+1)	Süle 63'; Boateng (yellow card) 64'; Sané (yellow card) 69'; Choupo-Moting 80'	Report	Zhivoglyadov (yellow card) 60'	Stadium: Allianz Arena; Attendance: 0 Referee: Sandro Schärer (Switzerland)

== Statistics ==
=== Goalscorers ===
As of 16 May 2021

Rank	No.	Pos.	Nat.	Name	Premier League	Russian Cup	Russian Super Cup	Champions League	Total
1	7	MF	(Poland)	Grzegorz Krychowiak	9	2	0	0	11
1	9	FW	(Russia)	Fyodor Smolov	7	4	0	0	11
3	25	FW	(Guinea)	François Kamano	5	4	0	0	9
4	11	MF	(Russia)	Anton Miranchuk	4	0	0	3	7
5	27	DF	(Brazil)	Murilo Cerqueira	4	1	0	0	5
6	20	DF	(Russia)	Vladislav Ignatyev	3	0	0	0	3
6	88	FW	(Belarus)	Vitaly Lisakovich	2	0	0	1	3
6	17	FW	(Russia)	Rifat Zhemaletdinov	3	0	0	0	3
9	19	FW	(Portugal)	Eder	1	0	0	1	2
9	59	MF	(Russia)	Aleksei Miranchuk	2	0	0	0	2
9	94	MF	(Russia)	Dmitri Rybchinsky	2	0	0	0	2
12	6	MF	(Russia)	Dmitri Barinov	1	0	0	0	1
12	14	DF	(Croatia)	Vedran Ćorluka	0	0	1	0	1
12	3	DF	(Brazil)	Pablo	0	1	0	0	1
12	31	DF	(Poland)	Maciej Rybus	1	0	0	0	1
12	29	FW	(Cape Verde)	Zé Luís	1	0	0	0	1
Totals					45	12	1	5	63
