= 2015–16 FC Lokomotiv Moscow season =

FC Lokomotiv Moscow
2015–16 season
- Chairman: Olga Smorodskaya
- Manager: Igor Cherevchenko
- Stadium: Lokomotiv Stadium
- Russian Premier League: 6th
- Russian Cup: Round of 16
- Russian Super Cup: Runners-up
- UEFA Europa League: Round of 32
- Top goalscorer: League: Aleksandr Samedov (9); All: Aleksandr Samedov (9)
- Highest home attendance: 22,304 vs CSKA Moscow (RFPL, 16 April 2016)
- Lowest home attendance: 5,110 vs Mordovia Saransk (RFPL, 31 May 2016)
- Average home league attendance: 10,581
Home colours	Away colours	Third colours

The 2015–16 FC Lokomotiv Moscow season was the club's 24th season in the Russian Premier League, the highest tier of association football in Russia. Lokomotiv Moscow also took part in the Russian Cup and the Europa League.

== Personnel ==
=== First team squad information ===
Players and squad numbers last updated on 7 April 2016.
Note: Flags indicate national team as has been defined under FIFA eligibility rules. Players may hold more than one non-FIFA nationality.

No.	Name	Nationality	Position	Date of birth (age)	Signed from	Since
Goalkeepers
1	Guilherme	(Brazil) (Russia)	GK	12 December 1985 (age 40)	(Brazil) Atlético Paranaense	2007
16	Ilya Lantratov	(Russia)	GK	11 November 1995 (age 31)	Lokomotiv-2 Moscow	2014
77	Anton Kochenkov	(Russia)	GK	2 April 1987 (age 39)	Mordovia Saransk	2015
81	Ilya Abayev	(Russia)	GK	2 August 1981 (age 45)	Volga Nizhny Novgorod	2013
Defenders
5	Nemanja Pejčinović	(Serbia)	DF	4 November 1987 (age 39)	(France) Nice	2014
14	Vedran Ćorluka (captain)	(Croatia)	DF	5 February 1986 (age 40)	(England) Tottenham Hotspur	2012
15	Arseny Logashov	(Russia)	DF	20 August 1991 (age 35)	Anzhi Makhachkala	2013
17	Taras Mykhalyk	(Ukraine)	DF	28 October 1983 (age 43)	(Ukraine) Dynamo Kyiv	2013
28	Ján Ďurica	(Slovakia)	DF	10 December 1981 (age 44)	Saturn Moscow Oblast	2009
29	Vitaliy Denisov	(Uzbekistan)	DF	23 February 1987 (age 39)	(Ukraine) Dnipro Dnipropetrovsk	2013
49	Roman Shishkin	(Russia)	DF	27 January 1987 (age 39)	Spartak Moscow	2010
55	Renat Yanbayev	(Russia)	DF	7 April 1984 (age 42)	Kuban Krasnodar	2007
Midfielders
3	Alan Kasaev	(Russia)	MF	8 April 1986 (age 40)	Dynamo Moscow	2014
4	Manuel Fernandes	(Portugal)	MF	5 February 1986 (age 40)	(Turkey) Beşiktaş	2014
8	Aleksandr Sheshukov	(Russia)	MF	15 April 1983 (age 43)	Rostov	2014
9	Maksim Grigoryev	(Russia)	MF	6 July 1990 (age 36)	MITOS Novocherkassk	2012
18	Aleksandr Kolomeytsev	(Russia)	MF	21 February 1989 (age 37)	Amkar Perm	2015
19	Aleksandr Samedov	(Russia)	MF	19 July 1984 (age 42)	Dynamo Moscow	2012
20	Vladislav Ignatyev	(Russia)	MF	20 January 1987 (age 39)	Kuban Krasnodar	2016
23	Dmitri Tarasov	(Russia)	MF	18 March 1987 (age 39)	FC Moscow	2010
36	Dmitri Barinov	(Russia)	MF	11 January 1996 (age 30)	Youth system	2013
59	Aleksei Miranchuk	(Russia)	MF	17 October 1995 (age 31)	Youth system	2012
88	Delvin N'Dinga	(Republic of the Congo)	MF	14 March 1988 (age 38)	(France) Monaco	2015
Forwards
7	Maicon	(Brazil)	FW	18 February 1990 (age 36)	(Brazil) Fluminense	2010
32	Petar Škuletić	(Serbia)	FW	29 June 1990 (age 36)	(Serbia) Partizan Belgrade	2015
45	Ezekiel Henty	(Nigeria)	FW	13 May 1993 (age 33)	(Slovenia) Olimpija Ljubljana	2016
96	Rifat Zhemaletdinov	(Russia)	FW	20 September 1996 (age 30)	Youth system	2013
Players who left the club midway through the season
11	Mbark Boussoufa	(Morocco)	MF	15 August 1984 (age 42)	Anzhi Makhachkala	2013
21	Baye Oumar Niasse	(Senegal)	FW	18 April 1990 (age 36)	(Turkey) Akhisar Belediyespor	2014
52	Sergei Makarov	(Russia)	MF	3 October 1996 (age 30)	Youth system	2013
60	Anton Miranchuk	(Russia)	MF	17 October 1995 (age 31)	Youth system	2012

== Transfers ==
=== Arrivals ===
==== Players in ====
Note: Flags indicate national team as has been defined under FIFA eligibility rules. Players may hold more than one non-FIFA nationality.

Name	Nationality	Position	From	Fee	Date	Source
Maksim Grigoryev	(Russia)	MF	Rostov	Returned from loan	18 June 2015	
Anton Kochenkov	(Russia)	GK	Mordovia Saransk	Free transfer	27 June 2015	
Aleksandr Kolomeytsev	(Russia)	MF	Amkar Perm	Free transfer	27 June 2015	
Anton Kochenkov	(Russia)	GK	Krasnodar	Returned from loan	1 January 2016	
Vladislav Ignatyev	(Russia)	MF	Kuban Krasnodar	Free transfer	10 February 2016	
Ezekiel Henty	(Nigeria)	FW	Olimpija Ljubljana	€5,000,000	19 February 2016	

==== Players in on loan ====
Note: Flags indicate national team as has been defined under FIFA eligibility rules. Players may hold more than one non-FIFA nationality.

Name	Nationality	Position	Loan from	Date	Until	Source
Delvin N'Dinga	(Republic of the Congo)	MF	(France) Monaco	9 July 2015	End of season	

=== Departures ===
==== Players out ====
Note: Flags indicate national team as has been defined under FIFA eligibility rules. Players may hold more than one non-FIFA nationality.

Name	Nationality	Position	To	Fee	Date	Source
Maksim Belyayev	(Russia)	DF	Shinnik Yaroslavl	Free transfer	30 June 2015	
Sergei Tkachyov	(Russia)	MF	Kuban Krasnodar	Undisclosed (~ €700,000)	1 July 2015	
Yan Tsiharaw	(Belarus)	MF	(Belarus) Dinamo Minsk	Free transfer	1 July 2015	
Roman Pavlyuchenko	(Russia)	FW	Kuban Krasnodar	Free transfer	1 July 2015	
Magomed Ozdoev	(Russia)	MF	Rubin Kazan	Free transfer	1 July 2015	
Victor Obinna	(Nigeria)	MF	Unattached	Free transfer	1 July 2015	
Alberto Zapater	(Spain)	MF	Unattached	Free transfer	August 2015	
Dmitri Sychev	(Russia)	FW	Unattached	Free transfer	30 November 2015	
Oumar Niasse	(Senegal)	FW	(England) Everton	€17,900,000	1 February 2016	

==== Players out on loan ====
Note: Flags indicate national team as has been defined under FIFA eligibility rules. Players may hold more than one non-FIFA nationality.

Name	Nationality	Position	Loan to	Date	Until	Source
Dmitri Sychev	(Russia)	FW	(Kazakhstan) Okzhetpes	13 March 2015	29 November 2015	
Miroslav Lobantsev	(Russia)	GK	Krylya Sovetov Samara	16 July 2015	End of season	
Anton Kochenkov	(Russia)	GK	Krasnodar	28 October 2015	31 December 2015	
Mbark Boussoufa	(Morocco)	MF	(Belgium) Gent	1 February 2016	End of season	
Anton Miranchuk	(Russia)	MF	(Estonia) Levadia Tallinn	2 February 2016	End of season	
Sergey Makarov	(Russia)	MF	(Belarus) Minsk	17 February 2016	End of season	

== Friendlies ==
=== Pre-season ===
26 June 2015	Lokomotiv Moscow	1–3	Chertanovo Moscow	Moscow
13:00 MSK (UTC+3)	Grigoryev 10'	Report	Zinkovskiy 40' (pen.); Kosyanchuk 52'; Kovalchuk 66'

4 July 2015	Lokomotiv Moscow	2–0	(Bulgaria) Ludogorets	Straßwalchen, Austria
18:30 MSK (UTC+3)	Miranchuk 43'; Škuletić 64'	Report

7 July 2015	Lokomotiv Moscow	2–2	(Azerbaijan) Qarabağ	Straßwalchen, Austria
19:30 MSK (UTC+3)	Kasaev 36'; Tarasov 72'	Report	Reynaldo 45'; Mammadov 77'

=== Mid-season ===
17 January 2016	Lokomotiv Moscow	1–0	(South Korea) Jeonbuk Hyundai Motors	Abu Dhabi, United Arab Emirates
16:00 MSK (UTC+3)	Miranchuk 72'	Report		Stadium: NYU Abu Dhabi Facilities

23 January 2016	Lokomotiv Moscow	3–0	(Uzbekistan) Bunyodkor	Abu Dhabi, United Arab Emirates
16:00 MSK (UTC+3)	Miranchuk 10'; Škuletić 32', 36'	Report		Stadium: NYU Abu Dhabi Facilities

1 February 2016 Atlantic Cup 2016; Group stage	Lokomotiv Moscow	1–1 (3–5 p)	(Sweden) Norrköping	Algarve, Portugal
16:00 MSK (UTC+3)	Škuletić 55'	Report	Nyman 5'	Stadium: Estádio Algarve; Referee: João Mendes
	Penalties
	Škuletić (penalty scored); Ďurica (penalty scored); Fernandes (penalty scored); Kolomeytsev (penalty missed)		Kujović (penalty scored); Nyman (penalty scored); Sjölund (penalty scored); Blomqvist (penalty scored); Wahlqvist (penalty scored)

4 February 2016 Atlantic Cup 2016; Group stage	Lokomotiv Moscow	0–0 (3–2 p)	(Denmark) Brøndby	Algarve, Portugal
16:00 MSK (UTC+3)		Report		Stadium: Estádio Algarve; Referee: Gonçalo Martins
	Penalties
	Pejčinović (penalty scored); Barinov (penalty missed); Miranchuk (penalty scored); Shishkin (penalty scored)		Pukki (penalty missed); Bruus (penalty missed); Stückler (penalty scored); Nørgaard (penalty scored); Hjulsager (penalty missed)

7 February 2016 Atlantic Cup 2016 3rd/4th place playoff	Lokomotiv Moscow	1–2	(Denmark) AGF Aarhus	Algarve, Portugal
21:00 MSK (UTC+3)	Miranchuk 84' (pen.)	Report	Rasmussen 52'; Vatsadze 80'	Stadium: Estádio Algarve; Referee: Pedro Campos

== Competitions ==
=== Overview ===
Competition	Started round	Final round	First match	Last match	G	W	D	L	GF	GA	GD	Win %
Super Cup	Final	Runners-up	12 July 2015	-	1	0	1	0	1	1	0	0.00%
Premier League	-	6th	19 July 2015	21 May 2016	30	14	8	8	43	33	+10	46.7%
Russian Cup	Round of 32	Round of 16	23 September 2015	29 October 2015	2	1	0	1	1	1	0	50.0%
Europa League	Group stage	Round of 32	17 September 2015	25 February 2016	8	3	3	2	13	10	+3	37.5%
Total					41	18	12	11	58	45	+13	43.9%

=== Russian Super Cup ===
12 July 2015	Zenit Saint Petersburg	1–1 (a.e.t.) (4–2 p)	Lokomotiv Moscow	Saint Petersburg
18:00 MSK (UTC+3)	Smolnikov 84'	Summary	Niasse 28'	Stadium: Petrovsky Stadium; Attendance: 17,337; Referee: Aleksei Nikolaev
	Penalties
	Hulk (penalty scored); Witsel (penalty scored); Ansaldi (penalty scored); Shatov (penalty missed); Criscito (penalty scored)		Grigoryev (penalty missed); Samedov (penalty scored); Pejčinović (penalty scored); Ćorluka (penalty missed)

=== Russian Premier League ===
==== League table ====
Pos	Team	Pld	W	D	L	GF	GA	GD	Pts	Qualification or relegation
4	Krasnodar	30	16	8	6	54	25	+29	56	Qualification for the Europa League third qualifying round
5	Spartak Moscow	30	15	5	10	48	39	+9	50	Qualification for the Europa League third qualifying round
6	Lokomotiv Moscow	30	14	8	8	43	33	+10	50	
7	Terek Grozny	30	11	11	8	35	30	+5	44	
8	Ural Sverdlovsk Oblast	30	10	9	11	39	46	−7	39	

Source: Russian Premier League, Soccerway
Rules for classification: 1) Points; 2) Matches won; 3) Head-to-head points; 4) Head-to-head matches won; 5) Head-to-head goal difference; 6) Head-to-head goals scored; 7) Head-to-head away goals; 8) Goal difference; 9) Goals scored; 10) Away goals scored.

==== Results by round ====
Round	1	2	3	4	5	6	7	8	9	10	11	12	13	14	15	16	17	18	19	20	21	22	23	24	25	26	27	28	29	30
Ground	A	A	H	A	H	A	H	A	H	A	H	A	H	A	H	H	A	H	A	H	A	H	A	H	A	H	A	H	A	H
Result	W	W	D	W	D	W	W	L	W	D	W	W	L	L	W	L	D	D	L	W	W	W	D	D	W	L	L	L	D	W
Position	3	2	3	3	3	3	2	2	2	2	2	2	2	3	3	3	3	3	3	3	3	3	4	4	3	5	5	6	6	6

Updated to match(es) played on 30 April 2016. Source: Russian Premier League
A = Away; H = Home; W = Win; D = Draw; L = Loss

==== Matches ====
19 July 2015 1	Mordovia Saransk	0–1	Lokomotiv Moscow	Saransk
18:00 MSK (UTC+3)		Summary	Škuletić 60'	Stadium: Start Stadium; Attendance: 7,210; Referee: Igor Nizovtsev

27 July 2015 2	Anzhi Makhachkala	1–3	Lokomotiv Moscow	Kaspiysk
20:00 MSK (UTC+3)	Haruna 15'	Summary	Škuletić 19'; Maicon 77'; Kasaev 82'	Stadium: Anzhi Arena; Attendance: 18,100; Referee: Sergey Ivanov

2 August 2015 3	Lokomotiv Moscow	1–1	Dynamo Moscow	Moscow
13:30 MSK (UTC+3)	Ćorluka 61'	Summary	Morozov 45'	Stadium: Lokomotiv Stadium; Attendance: 12,410; Referee: Sergei Karasev

8 August 2015 4	Ural Sverdlovsk Oblast	1–3	Lokomotiv Moscow	Yekaterinburg
17:00 MSK (UTC+3)	Yerokhin 73'	Summary	Samedov 28'; Niasse 40'; Maicon 90+1'	Stadium: SKB-Bank Arena; Attendance: 9,100; Referee: Sergey Kulikov

16 August 2015 5	Lokomotiv Moscow	0–0	Terek Grozny	Moscow
13:30 MSK (UTC+3)		Summary		Stadium: Lokomotiv Stadium; Attendance: 8,104; Referee: Vladislav Bezborodov

23 August 2015 6	Ufa	0–3	Lokomotiv Moscow	Ufa
13:30 MSK (UTC+3)	Igboun (yellow card) 37' (yellow-red card) 57'	Summary	Niasse 6'; Kasaev 36'; Pejčinović 80'	Stadium: Neftyanik Stadium; Attendance: 10,643; Referee: Vladimir Moskalyov

30 August 2015 7	Lokomotiv Moscow	2–1	Krasnodar	Moscow
13:30 MSK (UTC+3)	Niasse 18'; Kasaev 56'	Summary	Smolov 11'	Stadium: Lokomotiv Stadium; Attendance: 10,107; Referee: Sergey Ivanov

12 September 2015 8	Rubin Kazan	3–1	Lokomotiv Moscow	Kazan
19:00 MSK (UTC+3)	Carlos Eduardo 9'; Kanunnikov 25'; Bilyaletdinov 70'	Summary	Samedov 57'	Stadium: Central Stadium; Attendance: 17,987; Referee: Sergey Kulikov

20 September 2015 9	Lokomotiv Moscow	2–0	Krylia Sovetov Samara	Moscow
19:30 MSK (UTC+3)	Ćorluka 54'; Niasse 87'	Summary		Stadium: Lokomotiv Stadium; Attendance: 8,747; Referee: Mikhail Vilkov

26 September 2015 10	CSKA Moscow	1–1	Lokomotiv Moscow	Khimki
14:00 MSK (UTC+3)	Doumbia 16' (pen.)	Summary	Niasse 21' (pen.); Ćorluka (yellow card) 65' (yellow-red card) 81'; Cherevchenko (red card) 82'	Stadium: Arena Khimki; Attendance: 13,000; Referee: Sergei Karasev

4 October 2015 11	Lokomotiv Moscow	3–0	Amkar Perm	Moscow
19:00 MSK (UTC+3)	Kolomeytsev 28'; Samedov 78'; Al.Miranchuk 86'	Summary		Stadium: Lokomotiv Stadium; Attendance: 7,504; Referee: Sergey Lapochkin

18 October 2015 12	Spartak Moscow	1–2	Lokomotiv Moscow	Moscow
13:30 MSK (UTC+3)	Bocchetti 77'	Summary	Kolomeytsev 9'; Niasse 48'	Stadium: Otkrytiye Arena; Attendance: 38,651; Referee: Igor Fedotov

26 October 2015 13	Lokomotiv Moscow	0–2	Rostov	Moscow
19:30 MSK (UTC+3)		Summary	Poloz 57'; Doumbia 85'	Stadium: Lokomotiv Stadium; Attendance: 6,380; Referee: Mikhail Vilkov

1 November 2015 14	Kuban Krasnodar	6–2	Lokomotiv Moscow	Krasnodar
19:00 MSK (UTC+3)	Ignatyev 4' 90+'; Melgarejo 14' 27'; Armaș 19'; Tkachyov 38'	Summary	Niasse 64'; Kolomeytsev 76'	Stadium: Kuban Stadium; Attendance: 5,611; Referee: Sergey Lapochkin

8 November 2015 15	Lokomotiv Moscow	2–0	Zenit Saint Petersburg	Moscow
19:30 MSK (UTC+3)	Lombaerts 48' (o.g.); Samedov 58'	Summary		Stadium: Lokomotiv Stadium; Attendance: 14,140; Referee: Vladimir Moskalyov

21 November 2015 16	Lokomotiv Moscow	0–2	Anzhi Makhachkala	Moscow
19:00 MSK (UTC+3)		Summary	Abdulavov 55'; Boli 70'	Stadium: Lokomotiv; Attendance: 5,348; Referee: Vitali Meshkov

30 November 2015 17	Dynamo Moscow	2–2	Lokomotiv Moscow	Khimki
19:00 MSK (UTC+3)	Dyakov 35' (pen.) 90+'	Summary	Samedov 49'; Maicon 76'	Stadium: Arena Khimki; Attendance: 3,966; Referee: Aleksei Eskov

4 December 2015 18	Lokomotiv Moscow	2–2	Ural Sverdlovsk Oblast	Moscow
19:00 MSK (UTC+3)	Al.Miranchuk 17'; Niasse 80'	Summary	Sapeta 2'; Manucharyan 39'	Stadium: Lokomotiv Stadium; Attendance: 5,630; Referee: Sergey Ivanov

6 March 2016 19	Terek Grozny	2–1	Lokomotiv Moscow	Grozny
17:00 MSK (UTC+3)	Rybus 8' (pen.) 33'	Summary	Samedov 4'	Stadium: Akhmat-Arena; Attendance: 15,780; Referee: Aleksandr Egorov

13 March 2016 20	Lokomotiv Moscow	2–0	Ufa	Moscow
17:00 MSK (UTC+3)	Ignatyev 56' (pen.); Samedov 90'	Summary		Stadium: Lokomotiv; Attendance: 7,120; Referee: Kirill Levnikov

20 March 2016 21	Krasnodar	1–2	Lokomotiv Moscow	Krasnodar
19:30 MSK (UTC+3)	Pereyra 58'	Summary	Ďurica 39'; Samedov 67'	Stadium: Kuban Stadium; Attendance: 8,150; Referee: Vladislav Bezborodov

3 April 2016 22	Lokomotiv Moscow	1–0	Rubin Kazan	Moscow
17:00 MSK (UTC+3)	Škuletić 84'	Summary		Stadium: Lokomotiv; Attendance: 8,103; Referee: Vitali Meshkov

11 April 2016 23	Krylia Sovetov Samara	0–0	Lokomotiv Moscow	Samara
18:00 MSK (UTC+3)		Summary		Stadium: Metallurg Stadium; Attendance: 14,298; Referee: Vladimir Moskalyov

16 April 2016 24	Lokomotiv Moscow	1–1	CSKA Moscow	Moscow
17:00 MSK (UTC+3)	Ćorluka 22'	Summary	Olanare 84'	Stadium: Lokomotiv; Attendance: 22,304; Referee: Aleksei Nikolaev

24 April 2016 25	Amkar Perm	0–1	Lokomotiv Moscow	Perm
12:00 MSK (UTC+3)		Summary	Škuletić 19'	Stadium: Zvezda Stadium; Attendance: 5,850; Referee: Sergey Ivanov

30 April 2016 26	Lokomotiv Moscow	0–2	Spartak Moscow	Moscow
19:30 MSK (UTC+3)		Summary	Ďurica 43' (o.g.); Zé Luís 90+3'	Stadium: Lokomotiv; Attendance: 20,140; Referee: Igor Fedotov

6 May 2016 27	Rostov	2–1	Lokomotiv Moscow	Rostov-on-Don
19:30 MSK (UTC+3)	Azmoun 8'; Noboa 45+'	Summary	Škuletić 52'	Stadium: Olimp-2; Attendance: 14,500; Referee: Kirill Levnikov

11 May 2016 28	Lokomotiv Moscow	0–1	Kuban Krasnodar	Moscow
19:30 MSK (UTC+3)		Summary	Pavlyuchenko 79' (pen.)	Stadium: Lokomotiv; Attendance: 6,082; Referee: Sergey Lapochkin

15 May 2016 29	Zenit Saint Petersburg	3–1	Lokomotiv Moscow	Saint Petersburg
19:30 MSK (UTC+3)	Hulk 10' (pen.)	Summary	Samedov 45+' (pen.)	Stadium: Petrovsky Stadium; Attendance: 17,407; Referee: Mikhail Vilkov

21 May 2016 30	Lokomotiv Moscow	3–0	Mordovia Saransk	Moscow
13:30 MSK (UTC+3)	Zhemaletdinov 28' 66'; Škuletić 32'	Summary		Stadium: Lokomotiv; Attendance: 5,110; Referee: Vladislav Bezborodov

=== Russian Cup ===
23 September 2015 Round of 32	Torpedo Armavir	0–1	Lokomotiv Moscow	Armavir
15:30 MSK (UTC+3)		Summary	Škuletić 72'	Stadium: Yunost Stadium; Attendance: 3,100; Referee: Nikolay Voloshin

29 October 2015 Round of 16	Lokomotiv Moscow	0–1	Amkar Perm	Moscow
19:00 MSK (UTC+3)		Summary	Dzhikiya 57'	Stadium: Lokomotiv Stadium; Attendance: 8,185; Referee: Sergei Kulikov

=== Europa League ===
Lokomotiv have qualified directly for the group stage of the 2015-16 UEFA Europa League after winning the 2015 Russian Cup Final.

==== Group stage ====
The 48 teams which qualified for the group stage were seeded into four pots based on their 2015 UEFA club coefficients. Lokomotiv fell to be allocated into the third pot. The draw was held on 28 August 2015 in Monaco and Lokomotiv drawn the 2015 Portuguese Cup Winners Sporting CP, Turkish powerhouse Beşiktaş, and the 2015 Albanian league winners Skënderbeu Korçë.

===== League table =====
Pos	Team	Pld	W	D	L	GF	GA	GD	Pts	Qualification	LMO	SPO	BES	SKE
1	(Russia) Lokomotiv Moscow	6	3	2	1	12	7	+5	11	Advance to knockout phase	—	2–4	1–1	2–0
2	(Portugal) Sporting CP	6	3	1	2	14	11	+3	10	Advance to knockout phase	1–3	—	3–1	5–1
3	(Turkey) Beşiktaş	6	2	3	1	7	6	+1	9		1–1	1–1	—	2–0
4	(Albania) Skënderbeu	6	1	0	5	4	13	−9	3		0–3	3–0	0–1	—

Source: Soccerway
Rules for classification: Group stage tiebreakers

===== Matches =====
17 September 2015 1	Sporting CP	1–3	Lokomotiv Moscow	Lisbon, Portugal
22:05 MSK (UTC+3)	Montero 50'	Summary	Samedov 12' 56'; Niasse 65'	Stadium: Estádio José Alvalade; Attendance: 25,400; Referee: Robert Schörgenhofer

1 October 2015 2	Lokomotiv Moscow	2–0	Skënderbeu Korçë	Moscow
20:00 MSK (UTC+3)	Niasse 35'; Samedov 73'	Summary		Stadium: Lokomotiv Stadium; Attendance: 10,340; Referee: Orel Grinfeld

22 October 2015 3	Lokomotiv Moscow	1–1	Beşiktaş	Moscow
20:00 MSK (UTC+3)	Maicon 54'	Summary	Gómez 64'	Stadium: Lokomotiv Stadium; Attendance: 19,124; Referee: Serge Gumienny

5 November 2015 4	Beşiktaş	1–1	Lokomotiv Moscow	Istanbul, Turkey
19:00 MSK (UTC+3)	Quaresma 58'	Summary	Niasse 76'	Stadium: Vodafone Park; Attendance: 24,690; Referee: Felix Zwayer (Germany)

26 November 2015 5	Lokomotiv Moscow	2–4	Sporting CP	Moscow
20:00 MSK (UTC+4)	Maicon 5'; Miranchuk 86'	Summary	Montero 19'; Bryan Ruiz 37'; Gelson 42'; Matheus 60'	Stadium: Lokomotiv Stadium; Attendance: 11,043; Referee: Antonio Mateu Lahoz (Spain)

10 December 2015 6	Skënderbeu Korçë	0–3	Lokomotiv Moscow	Elbasan, Albania
22:05 MSK (UTC+4)		Summary	Tarasov 18'; Niasse 89'; Samedov 90'	Stadium: Elbasan Arena; Attendance: 1,152; Referee: Marijo Strahonja (Croatia)

==== Knockout phase ====
The draw for the first stage of the knockout phase, the round of 32, took place on Monday 14 December 2015. Lokomotiv was paired with Turkish side Fenerbahçe.

===== Round of 32 =====
16 February 2016 1st leg	Fenerbahçe	2–0	Lokomotiv Moscow	Istanbul, Turkey
20:00 MSK (UTC+3)	Souza 18', 72'	Summary		Stadium: Şükrü Saracoğlu Stadium; Attendance: 36,195; Referee: Martin Strömbergsson

25 February 2016 2nd leg	Lokomotiv Moscow	1–1	Fenerbahçe	Moscow
19:00 MSK (UTC+3)	Samedov 45'	Summary	Topal 83'	Stadium: Lokomotiv Stadium; Attendance: 15,695; Referee: Ivan Kružliak

== Squad statistics ==
After 30 April 2016

No	Name	Premier League				Russian Cup and Supercup				Europa League				Total			
No	Name	Apps	Goals	Yellow card	Red card	Apps	Goals	Yellow card	Red card	Apps	Goals	Yellow card	Red card	Apps	Goals	Yellow card	Red card
Goalkeepers
1	Guilherme	30	-33	3	0	1	-1	1	0	8	-10	1	0	39	-44	4	0
16	Ilya Lantratov	0	0	0	0	0	0	0	0	0	0	0	0	0	0	0	0
77	Anton Kochenkov	0	0	0	0	0	0	0	0	0	0	0	0	0	0	0	0
81	Ilya Abayev	0	0	0	0	2	-1	0	0	0	0	0	0	2	-1	0	0
Defenders
5	Nemanja Pejčinović	21	1	4	0	2	0	0	0	5	0	0	0	28	1	4	0
14	Vedran Ćorluka	24	3	5	1	1	0	0	0	4	0	0	1	29	3	5	2
15	Arseny Logashov	8	0	3	0	2	0	0	0	2	0	1	0	12	0	4	0
17	Taras Mykhalyk	21	0	3	0	2	0	0	0	6	0	2	0	29	0	5	0
28	Ján Ďurica	13	1	2	0	1	0	0	0	6	0	0	0	20	1	2	0
29	Vitaliy Denisov	29	0	5	0	2	0	0	0	7	0	1	0	36	0	6	0
49	Roman Shishkin	19	0	2	0	2	0	0	0	5	0	1	0	26	0	3	0
55	Renat Yanbayev	10	0	2	0	2	0	0	0	3	0	0	0	15	0	2	0
Midfielders
3	Alan Kasaev	24	3	2	0	2	0	1	0	5	0	0	0	31	3	3	0
4	Manuel Fernandes	4	0	0	0	2	0	0	0	7	0	0	0	13	0	0	0
8	Aleksandr Sheshukov	0	0	0	0	0	0	0	0	0	0	0	0	0	0	0	0
9	Maksim Grigoryev	5	0	0	0	3	0	0	0	3	0	0	0	11	0	0	0
11	Mbark Boussoufa	1	0	0	0	1	1	1	0	0	0	0	0	2	1	1	0
18	Aleksandr Kolomeytsev	28	3	2	0	3	0	1	0	7	0	1	0	38	3	4	0
19	Aleksandr Samedov	28	9	4	0	1	0	0	0	8	5	1	0	37	14	5	0
20	Vladislav Ignatyev	7	1	0	0	0	0	0	0	0	0	0	0	7	1	0	0
23	Dmitri Tarasov	23	0	3	0	1	0	1	0	5	1	3	0	29	1	7	0
36	Dmitri Barinov	2	0	1	0	2	0	1	0	0	0	0	0	4	0	2	0
52	Sergei Makarov	0	0	0	0	0	0	0	0	0	0	0	0	0	0	0	0
59	Aleksei Miranchuk	27	2	3	0	2	0	0	0	6	1	0	0	35	3	2	0
60	Anton Miranchuk	0	0	0	0	0	0	0	0	0	0	0	0	0	0	0	0
88	Delvin N'Dinga	24	0	2	0	1	0	0	0	8	0	1	0	33	0	3	0
Forwards
7	Maicon	14	3	3	0	3	0	1	0	7	2	0	0	24	5	4	0
21	Oumar Niasse	15	8	2	0	2	1	0	0	6	4	3	0	23	13	5	0
32	Petar Škuletić	18	6	1	0	2	1	1	0	4	0	0	0	24	7	2	0
45	Ezekiel Henty	10	0	3	0	0	0	0	0	0	0	0	0	10	0	3	0
96	Rifat Zhemaletdinov	5	3	0	0	0	0	0	0	1	0	1	0	6	3	1	0

== Awards ==
=== Lokomotiv player of the month award ===
Awarded monthly to the player that was chosen by fan voting on Lokomotiv's official portal on VK.

Month	First				Second				Third			
Month	No.	Name	Votes	%	No.	Name	Votes	%	No.	Name	Votes	%
July	3	Alan Kasaev	1,195 (2nd round); 1,470 (1st round)	55.8%	14	Vedran Ćorluka	951 (2nd round) 1,469 (1st round)	44.2%	32	Petar Škuletić	885 (1st round)	N/a
August	3	Alan Kasaev	2,430	46.1%	21	Baye Oumar Niasse	1,689	32.0%	29	Vitaliy Denisov	670	12.7%
September	21	Baye Oumar Niasse	3,182	70.7%	1	Guilherme	531	11.8%	19	Aleksandr Samedov	496	11.0%
October	21	Baye Oumar Niasse	2,225	48.5%	29	Vitaly Denisov	699	15.6%	19	Aleksandr Samedov	648	14.5%
November	21	Baye Oumar Niasse	1,768	38.5%	19	Aleksandr Samedov	1,325	28.8%	59	Aleksei Miranchuk	660	14.3%
December	21	Baye Oumar Niasse	2,410	48.9%	19	Aleksandr Samedov	1,316	26.7%	29	Vitaly Denisov	504	10.2%
February	1	Guilherme	1,838	34.2%	19	Aleksandr Samedov	1,568	29.1%	29	Vitaly Denisov	1114	20.7%
March	19	Aleksandr Samedov	4,543	87.2%	28	Ján Ďurica	232	4.4%	29	Vitaly Denisov	210	4.0%
April	1	Guilherme	1,731	35.4%	19	Aleksandr Samedov	1,256	25.7%	29	Vitaly Denisov	760	15.5%
May	96	Rifat Zhemaletdinov	4,314	68.7%	59	Aleksei Miranchuk	1,156	16.8%	19	Vitaly Denisov	961	13.9%

=== Lokomotiv player of the year award ===
Awarded to the player that was chosen by fan voting on Lokomotiv's official portal on VK as the best player of the season.

Season	First				Second				Third			
Season	No.	Name	Votes	%	No.	Name	Votes	%	No.	Name	Votes	%
2015–16	19	Aleksandr Samedov	2,347	36.3%	21	Baye Oumar Niasse	1,187	18.3%	1	Guilherme	841	13.0%
