= 2018–19 FC Lokomotiv Moscow season =

FC Lokomotiv Moscow
- Chairman: Ilya Herkus (until 28 December 2018); Vasili Kiknadze (since 29 December 2018)
- Manager: Yury Semin
- Stadium: RZD Arena
- Russian Premier Liga: 2nd
- Super Cup: Runners-up
- Russian Cup: Winners
- UEFA Champions League: Group stage
- Top goalscorer: League: Anton Miranchuk (11); All: Anton Miranchuk (16)
- Highest home attendance: 26,892 vs CSKA (RFPL, 20 April 2019)
- Lowest home attendance: 7,218 vs Orenburg (RFPL, 8 December 2018)
- Average home league attendance: 15,096
Home colours	Away colours	Third colours

The 2018–19 season was the 27th season of FC Lokomotiv Moscow in the Russian Premier League, the highest tier of the Russian football league system. Lokomotiv Moscow was the league defending champions. Lokomotiv Moscow also won the Russian Cup and took part in the Champions League. Lokomotiv also contested the Russian Super Cup.

Lokomotiv launched a women's team, which are participating in the Russian Women's Football Championship, the highest division in Russia for women football.

== First team squad ==
=== Information ===
Players and squad numbers last updated on 20 February 2019.
Note: Flags indicate national team as has been defined under FIFA eligibility rules. Players may hold more than one non-FIFA nationality.

No.	Name	Nationality	Position	Date of birth (age)	Signed from	Since
Goalkeepers
1	Guilherme	(Russia)	GK	12 December 1985 (age 40)	(Brazil) Atlético Paranaense	2007
30	Nikita Medvedev	(Russia)	GK	14 December 1994 (age 31)	Rostov	2017
77	Anton Kochenkov	(Russia)	GK	2 April 1987 (age 38)	Mordovia Saransk	2015
Defenders
3	Brian Idowu	(Nigeria)	DF	18 May 1992 (age 33)	Amkar Perm	2018
5	Benedikt Höwedes	(Germany)	DF	29 February 1988 (age 37)	(Germany) Schalke 04	2018
14	Vedran Ćorluka	(Croatia)	DF	5 February 1986 (age 39)	(England) Tottenham Hotspur	2012
17	Taras Mykhalyk	(Ukraine)	DF	28 October 1983 (age 42)	(Ukraine) Dynamo Kyiv	2013
28	Boris Rotenberg	(Finland)	DF	19 May 1986 (age 39)	Dynamo Moscow	2016
33	Solomon Kvirkvelia	(Georgia (country))	DF	6 February 1992 (age 33)	Rubin Kazan	2017
84	Mikhail Lysov	(Russia)	DF	29 January 1998 (age 28)	Youth system	2014
Midfielders
4	Manuel Fernandes	(Portugal)	MF	5 February 1986 (age 39)	(Turkey) Beşiktaş	2014
6	Dmitri Barinov	(Russia)	MF	11 January 1996 (age 30)	Youth system	2013
7	Grzegorz Krychowiak	(Poland)	MF	29 January 1990 (age 36)	(France) Paris Saint-Germain	2018
8	Jefferson Farfán	(Peru)	MF	26 October 1984 (age 41)	(United Arab Emirates) Al Jazira	2017
11	Anton Miranchuk	(Russia)	MF	17 October 1995 (age 30)	Youth system	2012
18	Aleksandr Kolomeytsev	(Russia)	MF	21 February 1989 (age 36)	Amkar Perm	2015
20	Vladislav Ignatyev	(Russia)	MF	20 January 1987 (age 39)	Kuban Krasnodar	2016
21	Khvicha Kvaratskhelia	(Georgia (country))	MF	12 February 2001 (age 24)	(Georgia (country)) Rustavi	2019
23	Dmitri Tarasov	(Russia)	MF	18 March 1987 (age 38)	FC Moscow	2010
27	Igor Denisov (captain)	(Russia)	MF	17 May 1984 (age 41)	Dynamo Moscow	2016
31	Maciej Rybus	(Poland)	MF	19 August 1989 (age 36)	(France) Lyon	2017
59	Aleksei Miranchuk	(Russia)	MF	17 October 1995 (age 30)	Youth system	2012
Forwards
9	Fyodor Smolov	(Russia)	FW	9 February 1990 (age 35)	Krasnodar	2018
24	Eder	(Portugal)	FW	22 December 1987 (age 38)	(France) Lille	2017
96	Rifat Zhemaletdinov	(Russia)	FW	20 September 1996 (age 29)	Rubin Kazan	2018

== Transfers ==
=== Arrivals ===
Permanent transfer
Name	Nationality	Position	From	Fee	Date	Source
Rifat Zhemaletdinov	(Russia)	FW	Rubin Kazan	Undisclosed (~ €1,500,000)	23 June 2018	
Brian Idowu	(Nigeria) (Russia)	DF	Amkar Perm	Free Transfer	10 July 2018	
Benedikt Höwedes	(Germany)	DF	(Germany) Schalke 04	Undisclosed (~ €5,000,000)	31 July 2018	
Fyodor Smolov	(Russia)	FW	Krasnodar	Undisclosed (~ €9,000,000)	9 August 2018	
Permanent transfer, originally on loan
Name	Nationality	Position	From	Fee	Date	Source
Eder	(Portugal) (Guinea-Bissau)	FW	(France) Lille	Undisclosed (~ €500,000)	16 July 2018	
In on loan
Name	Nationality	Position	From	Date	Until	Source
Grzegorz Krychowiak	(Poland)	MF	(France) Paris Saint-Germain	24 July 2018	End of Season	
Khvicha Kvaratskhelia	(Georgia (country))	MF	(Georgia (country)) Rustavi	15 February 2019	End of Season	
Returned after loan
Name		Nationality	Position	From		Source
Timofei Margasov		(Russia)	DF	Tosno		
Igor Portnyagin		(Russia)	FW	Ural Yekaterinburg		

=== Departures ===
Permanent transfer
Name	Nationality	Position	To	Fee	Date	Source
Amir Natkho	(Russia)	MF	Released		1 July 2018	
Nemanja Pejčinović	(Serbia)	DF	(China) Changchun Yatai	Free transfer	8 July 2018	
Miroslav Lobantsev	(Russia)	GK	Rotor Volgograd	Free transfer	12 July 2018	
Out on loan
Name	Nationality	Position	To	Date	Until	Source
Alan Kasaev	(Russia)	MF	Baltika Kaliningrad	3 July 2018	End of season	
Arshak Koryan	(Russia) (Armenia)	FW	Khimki	17 July 2018	31 December 2018	
Igor Portnyagin	(Russia)	FW	Khimki	2 August 2018	End of season	
Vitaliy Denisov	(Uzbekistan)	DF	Krylya Sovetov	21 August 2018	End of year	
Artyom Galadzhan	(Russia)	FW	Orenburg	28 August 2018	End of season	
Returned after loan
Name		Nationality	Position	To		Source
Ari		(Brazil)	FW	Krasnodar		

== Friendlies ==
=== Pre-season ===
29 June 2018	Lokomotiv Moscow	1–1	Austria Klagenfurt	Bad Kleinkirchheim, Austria
19:00 MSK (UTC+3)	Zhemaletdinov 36'	Summary	Volkan Akyildiz 21'	Stadium: Sportarena Bad Kleinkirchheim

3 July 2018	Lokomotiv Moscow	0–0	(Croatia) Osijek	Murau, Austria
19:00 MSK (UTC+3)		Summary		Stadium: Sportplatz SVU Murau

13 July 2018	Lokomotiv Moscow	0–0	(Austria) Wolfsberger AC	Wolfsberg, Austria
21:00 MSK (UTC+3)		Summary		Stadium: Lavanttal-Arena

17 July 2018	Lokomotiv Moscow	0–3	(Netherlands) Vitesse	Klagenfurt, Austria
13:00 MSK (UTC+3)		Summary	Bruns 30'; Beerens 62'; Büttner 88'	Stadium: Sportzentrum Fischl

21 July 2018	Lokomotiv Moscow	2–1	(Turkey) Akhisar Belediyespor	Bad Kleinkirchheim, Austria
17:00 MSK (UTC+3)	An. Miranchuk 61'; Barinov 80'	Summary	Barbosa 44'	Stadium: Sportarena Bad Kleinkirchheim

== Competitions ==
=== Overview ===
Competition	Started round	Final round	First match	Last match	G	W	D	L	GF	GA	GD	Win %
Super Cup	Final		27 July 2018		1	0	0	1	0	1	−1	0.0%
Premier League			30 July 2018	26 May 2019	30	16	8	6	45	28	+17	53.33%
Russian Cup	Round of 32	Final	26 September 2018	22 May 2019	7	6	1	0	14	5	+9	85.71%
Champions League	Group stage		18 September 2018	11 December 2018	6	1	0	5	4	12	-8	16.67%
Total					44	23	9	12	63	46	+17	52.27%

=== Russian Super Cup ===
27 July 2018	Lokomotiv Moscow	0–1	CSKA Moscow	Nizhny Novgorod
MSK (UTC+3)		Summary	Khosonov 106'	Stadium: Nizhny Novgorod Stadium; Attendance: 43,319; Referee: Vladislav Bezborodov

=== Russian Premier Liga ===
==== League table ====
Pos	Team	Pld	W	D	L	GF	GA	GD	Pts	Qualification or relegation
1	Zenit Saint Petersburg (C)	30	20	4	6	57	29	+28	64	Qualification for the Champions League group stage
2	Lokomotiv Moscow	30	16	8	6	45	28	+17	56 (Note: Head-to-head away goals: Lokomotiv 1, Krasnodar 0.)	Qualification for the Champions League group stage
3	Krasnodar	30	16	8	6	55	23	+32	56	Qualification for the Champions League third qualifying round
4	CSKA Moscow	30	14	9	7	46	23	+23	51	Qualification for the Europa League group stage (Note: Lokomotiv Moscow won the 2018–19 Russian Cup. As they already qualified for the Champions League, the Europa League group stage spot (originally designated for the Cup winner) goes to the fourth-placed team, third qualifying round spot goes to fifth-placed team and second qualifying round spot goes to sixth-placed team.)
5	Spartak Moscow	30	14	7	9	36	31	+5	49	Qualification for the Europa League third qualifying round

Updated to match(es) played on 26 May 2019. Source: Russian Premier League, Soccerway
Rules for classification: 1) Points; 2) Head-to-head points; 3) Head-to-head matches won; 4) Head-to-head goal difference; 5) Head-to-head goals scored; 6) Head-to-head away goals; 7) Matches won; 8) Goal difference; 9) Goals scored; 10) Away goals scored; 11) Play-off.
(C) Champions

==== Results by Round ====
Round	1	2	3	4	5	6	7	8	9	10	11	12	13	14	15	16	17	18	19	20	21	22	23	24	25	26	27	28	29	30
Ground	A	H	A	A	H	A	H	A	H	A	H	A	H	A	H	A	H	H	A	H	A	H	A	H	A	H	A	H	A	H
Result	D	D	L	W	W	L	D	L	W	W	W	W	W	D	L	L	W	D	W	W	W	D	W	D	W	W	L	W	D	W
Position	6	11	14	9	5	8	10	11	7	7	4	3	2	3	4	5	5	5	5	3	2	4	2	2	2	2	2	2	2	2

Updated to match(es) played on 26 May 2019. Source: Russian Premier League
A = Away; H = Home; W = Win; D = Draw; L = Loss

==== Matches ====
30 July 2018 1	Ufa	0–0	Lokomotiv Moscow	Ufa
18:00 MSK (UTC+3)		Summary		Stadium: Neftyanik Stadium; Attendance: 8,368; Referee: Mikhail Vilkov

4 August 2018 2	Lokomotiv Moscow	0–0	Spartak Moscow	Moscow
19:00 MSK (UTC+3)		Summary		Stadium: RZD Arena; Attendance: 22,027; Referee: Vladimir Moskalyov

12 August 2018 3	Orenburg	1–0	Lokomotiv Moscow	Orenburg
14:00 MSK (UTC+3)	Chukanov 90+'	Summary		Stadium: Gazovik Stadium; Attendance: 7,023; Referee: Sergey Ivanov

19 August 2018 4	Krylya Sovetov Samara	0–1	Lokomotiv Moscow	Samara
16:30 MSK (UTC+3)		Summary	Krychowiak 37'	Stadium: Samara Arena; Attendance: 31,652; Referee: Evgeny Turbin

26 August 2018 5	Lokomotiv Moscow	2–1	Anji Makhachkala	Moscow
19:00 MSK (UTC+3)	Rybus 55'; Smolov 73'	Summary	Kulik 90+' (pen.)	Stadium: RZD Arena; Attendance: 15,245; Referee: Vasily Kazartsev

1 September 2018 6	Krasnodar	2–1	Lokomotiv Moscow	Krasnodar
19:00 MSK (UTC+3)	Wanderson 39'; Suleymanov 9)+'	Summary	Fernandes 33' (pen.)	Stadium: Krasnodar Stadium; Attendance: 25,714; Referee: Vladislav Bezborodov

14 September 2018 7	Lokomotiv Moscow	1–1	Dynamo Moscow	Moscow
19:30 MSK (UTC+3)	An. Miranchuk 32'	Summary	Nunes Cardoso 5'	Stadium: RZD Arena; Attendance: 17,023; Referee: Aleksei Matyunin

23 September 2018 8	Zenit Saint Petersburg	5–3	Lokomotiv Moscow	Saint Petersburg
16:30 MSK (UTC+3)	Shatov 13' 64'; Yerokhin 48'; Dzyuba 57'; Driussi 90'	Summary	Barinov 17'; Al. Miranchuk 74'; Smolov 86'	Stadium: Krestovsky Stadium; Attendance: 50,193; Referee: Roman Galimov

29 September 2018 9	Lokomotiv Moscow	2–0	Akhmat Grozny	Moscow
19:00 MSK (UTC+3)	Fernandes 81'; Zhemaletdinov 90+'	Summary		Stadium: RZD Arena; Attendance: 10,083; Referee: Evgeny Turbin

7 October 2018 10	CSKA Moscow	0–1	Lokomotiv Moscow	Moscow
19:00 MSK (UTC+3)		Summary	Höwedes 88'	Stadium: VEB Arena; Attendance: 22,275; Referee: Aleksei Matyunin

19 October 2018 11	Lokomotiv Moscow	2–1	Rostov	Moscow
20:30 MSK (UTC+3)	An. Miranchuk 26'; Kvirkvelia 60'	Summary	Ingason 27'	Stadium: RZD Arena; Attendance: 13,345; Referee: Sergey Lapohckin

28 October 2018 12	Yenisey Krasnoyarsk	0–3	Lokomotiv Moscow	Krasnoyarsk
14:00 MSK (UTC+3)		Summary	Al. Miranchuk 22'; Fernandes 81'; Eder 84'	Stadium: Central Stadium; Attendance: 11,436; Referee: Vladislav Bezborodov

3 November 2018 13	Lokomotiv Moscow	3–1	Arsenal Tula	Moscow
14:00 MSK (UTC+3)	Höwedes 26'; An. Miranchuk 70', 74'	Summary	Belyayev 35'	Stadium: RZD Arena; Attendance: 12,257; Referee: Sergey Ivanov

11 November 2018 14	Rubin Kazan	0–0	Lokomotiv Moscow	Kazan
16:30 MSK (UTC+3)		Summary		Stadium: Kazan Arena; Attendance: 7,719; Referee: Vladislav Bezborodov

23 November 2018 15	Lokomotiv Moscow	1–2	Ural Yekaterinburg	Moscow
20:30 MSK (UTC+3)	Smolov 26'	Summary	Kulakov 31'; El Kabir 51' (pen.)	Stadium: RZD Arena; Attendance: 12,870; Referee: Sergey Lapochkin

2 December 2018 16	Spartak Moscow	2–1	Lokomotiv Moscow	Moscow
19:00 MSK (UTC+3)	Glushakov 5'; Luiz Adriano 37'	Summary	Farfán 79'	Stadium: Otkritie Arena; Attendance: 25,006; Referee: Sergei Karasev

8 December 2018 17	Lokomotiv Moscow	2–1	Orenburg	Moscow
16:30 MSK (UTC+3)	Farfán 76', 81'	Summary	Despotović 8'	Stadium: RZD Arena; Attendance: 7,218; Referee: Kirill Levnikov

2 March 2019 18	Lokomotiv Moscow	2–2	Krylya Sovetov Samara	Moscow
16:30 MSK (UTC+3)	An. Miranchuk 23', 65'	Summary	Ananidze 19'; Sheydayev 69'	Stadium: RZD Arena; Attendance: 10,534; Referee: Vladislav Bezborodov

10 March 2019 19	Anzhi Makhachkala	0–2	Lokomotiv Moscow	Kaspiysk
21:00 MSK (UTC+3)		Summary	Farfán 21'; Smolov 80'	Stadium: Anzhi Arena; Attendance: 4,860; Referee: Nikolay Voloshin

17 March 2019 20	Lokomotiv Moscow	1–0	Krasnodar	Moscow
16:30 MSK (UTC+3)	An. Miranchuk 69' (pen.)	Summary		Stadium: RZD Arena; Attendance: 16,274; Referee: Mikhail Vilkov

30 March 2019 21	Dynamo Moscow	0–1	Lokomotiv Moscow	Khimki
14:00 MSK (UTC+3)		Summary	An. Miranchuk 64' (pen.)	Stadium: Arena Khimki; Attendance: 8,106; Referee: Aleksei Eskov

7 April 2019 22	Lokomotiv Moscow	1–1	Zenit Saint Petersburg	Moscow
19:00 MSK (UTC+3)	Ignatyev 61'	Summary	Rakitskiy 54'	Stadium: RZD Arena; Attendance: 21,158; Referee: Sergey Ivanov

13 April 2019 23	Akhmat Grozny	1–3	Lokomotiv Moscow	Grozny
19:30 MSK (UTC+3)	Ravanelli 47'	Summary	Smolov 45+1'; Al. Miranchuk 57'; Farfán 65'	Stadium: Akhmat-Arena; Attendance: 16,342; Referee: Nikolay Voloshin

20 April 2019 24	Lokomotiv Moscow	1–1	CSKA Moscow	Moscow
19:00 MSK (UTC+3)	Höwedes 13'	Summary	Chalov 40'	Stadium: RZD Arena; Attendance: 26,892; Referee: Aleksei Eskov

24 April 2019 25	Rostov	1–2	Lokomotiv Moscow	Rostov-on-Don
19:00 MSK (UTC+3)	Ionov 39' (pen.)	Summary	Farfán 5', 83'	Stadium: Rostov Arena; Attendance: 29,173; Referee: Vitali Meshkov

28 April 2019 26	Lokomotiv Moscow	2–1	Yenisey Krasnoyarsk	Moscow
14:00 MSK (UTC+3)	Kichin 67' (o.g.); Farfán 88'	Summary	Kostyukov 84'	Stadium: RZD Arena; Attendance: 10,062; Referee: Sergey Lapochkin

4 May 2019 27	Arsenal Tula	2–0	Lokomotiv Moscow	Tula
19:00 MSK (UTC+3)	Bakayev 24'; Đorđević 59'	Summary		Stadium: Arsenal Stadium; Attendance: 17,782; Referee: Evgeny Turbin

10 May 2019 28	Lokomotiv Moscow	4–0	Rubin Kazan	Moscow
19:00 MSK (UTC+3)	An. Miranchuk 4' (pen.); Smolov 10'; Krychowiak 74'; Kvaratskhelia 87'	Summary		Stadium: RZD Arena; Attendance: 13,263; Referee: Vladislav Bezborodov

19 May 2019 29	Ural Yekaterinburg	2–2	Lokomotiv Moscow	Yekaterinburg
11:30 MSK (UTC+3)	Panyukov 39'; Guilherme 46' (o.g.)	Summary	An. Miranchuk 21', 64' (pen.)	Stadium: Central Stadium; Attendance: 20,647; Referee: Vladimir Moskalyov

26 May 2019 30	Lokomotiv Moscow	1–0	Ufa	Moscow
14:00 MSK (UTC+3)	Fernandes 39' (penalty missed) 50'	Summary		Stadium: RZD Arena; Attendance: 18,183; Referee: Sergey Ivanov

=== Russian Cup ===
26 September 2018 Round of 32	Baltika Kaliningrad	2–3 (a.e.t.)	Lokomotiv Moscow	Kaliningrad
21:00 MSK (UTC+3)	Kasaev 28'; Magal 64'	Summary	Al. Miranchuk 35'; Eder 88'; An. Miranchuk 105'	Stadium: Kaliningrad Stadium; Attendance: 25,231; Referee: Aleksei Amelin

31 October 2018 Round of 16	Lokomotiv Moscow	4–1	Yenisey Krasnoyarsk	Moscow
19:30 MSK (UTC+3)	Eder 13' (pen.); An. Miranchuk 39' 57'; Al. Miranchuk 48'	Summary	Kutyin 84'	Stadium: RZD Arena; Attendance: 8,276; Referee: Aleksei Sukhoi

5 December 2018 Quarter-finals, 1st leg	Lokomotiv Moscow	1–0	Rubin Kazan	Moscow
18:30 MSK (UTC+3)	Ćorluka 54'	Summary		Stadium: RZD Arena; Attendance: 8,276; Referee: Nikolay Voloshin

6 March 2019 Quarter-finals, 2nd leg	Rubin Kazan	0–1 (0–2 agg.)	Lokomotiv Moscow	Kazan
19:00 MSK (UTC+3)		Summary	Höwedes 77'	Stadium: Kazan Arena; Attendance: 10,349; Referee: Sergey Ivanov

3 April 2019 Semi-finals, 1st leg	Lokomotiv Moscow	2–2	Rostov	Moscow
19:30 MSK (UTC+3)	Miranchuk 67'; Novoseltsev 54'	Summary	Eremenko 50'; Popov 84'	Stadium: RZD Arena; Attendance: 10,171; Referee: Kirill Levnikov

15 May 2019 Semi-finals, 2nd leg	Rostov	0–2 (2–4 agg.)	Lokomotiv Moscow	Rostov-on-Don
19:30 MSK (UTC+3)		Summary	Zhemaletdinov 45+2'; Smolov 63'	Stadium: Rostov Arena; Attendance: 32,580; Referee: Sergey Lapochkin

22 May 2019 Final	Lokomotiv Moscow	1–0	Ural Yekaterinburg	Samara
18:30 MSK (UTC+3)	Barinov 27'	Summary		Stadium: Samara Arena; Attendance: 38,018; Referee: Sergey Lapochkin

=== Champions League ===
Lokomotiv have qualified directly for the group stage of the 2018–19 UEFA Champions League League after winning the 2017–18 Russian Premier League.

==== Group stage ====
Pos	Team	Pld	W	D	L	GF	GA	GD	Pts	Qualification
1	(Portugal) Porto	6	5	1	0	15	6	+9	16	Advance to knockout phase
2	(Germany) Schalke 04	6	3	2	1	6	4	+2	11	Advance to knockout phase
3	(Turkey) Galatasaray	6	1	1	4	5	8	−3	4	Transfer to Europa League
4	(Russia) Lokomotiv Moscow	6	1	0	5	4	12	−8	3	

Source: UEFA
Rules for classification: Group stage tiebreakers

18 September 2018 1	Galatasaray (Turkey)	3–0	Lokomotiv Moscow	Istanbul, Turkey
22:00 MSK (UTC+3)	Rodrigues 9'; Derdiyok 67'; İnan 90+4' (pen.)	Summary		Stadium: Türk Telekom Stadium; Attendance: 43,542; Referee: Gianluca Rocchi (Italy)

3 October 2018 2	Lokomotiv Moscow	0–1	(Germany) Schalke 04	Moscow
19:55 MSK (UTC+3)		Summary	McKennie 88'	Stadium: RZD Arena; Attendance: 21,471; Referee: Anthony Taylor (England)

24 October 2018 3	Lokomotiv Moscow	1–3	(Portugal) Porto	Moscow
22:00 MSK (UTC+3)	Miranchuk 38'	Summary	Marega 26' (pen.); Herrera 35'; Corona 47'	Stadium: RZD Arena; Attendance: 16,034; Referee: Bobby Madden (Scotland)

6 November 2018 4	Porto (Portugal)	4–1	Lokomotiv Moscow	Porto, Portugal
23:00 MSK (UTC+3)	Herrera 2'; Marega 42'; Corona 67'; Otávio 90+3'	Summary	Farfán 59'	Stadium: Estádio do Dragão; Attendance: 34,616; Referee: Davide Massa (Italy)

28 November 2018 5	Lokomotiv Moscow	2–0	(Turkey) Galatasaray	Moscow
20:55 MSK (UTC+3)	Donk 43' (o.g.); Ignatyev 54'	Summary		Stadium: RZD Arena; Attendance: 14,037; Referee: Antonio Mateu Lahoz (Spain)

11 December 2018 6	Schalke 04 (Germany)	1–0	Lokomotiv Moscow	Gelsenkirchen, Germany
20:55 MSK (UTC+3)	Schöpf 90+1'	Summary		Stadium: Arena AufSchalke; Attendance: 48,883; Referee: Anastasios Sidiropoulos (Greece)

== FC Kazanka Moscow ==
FC Kazanka Moscow
2018–19 season
- Chairman: Ilya Herkus
- Manager: Denis Klyuyev
- Stadium: Sapsan Arena
- Russian Professional Football League – West: 2nd
- Top goalscorer: League: Aleksandr Dolgov 15; All: Aleksandr Dolgov 15
Home colours	Away colours

The 2018/19 FC Kazanka Moscow season will be the club's 2nd season in the Russian Professional Football League following the club's relaunch last year.

=== Squad information ===
Players and squad numbers last updated on 2 June 2019.
Note: Flags indicate national team as has been defined under FIFA eligibility rules. Players may hold more than one non-FIFA nationality.

No	Nationality	Name	No	Nationality	Name	No	Nationality	Name
Goalkeepers
16	(Russia)	Andrey Savin	29	(Russia)	Mikhail Mzhelsky	35	(Russia)	Vitali Sychyov
Defenders
3	(Russia)	Ivan Lapshov	4	(Russia)	Valentin Vinnichenko	18	(Russia)	Innokenti Samokhvalov
27	(Russia)	Stanislav Magkeyev	43	(Russia)	Artyom Gyurdzhan	44	(Russia)	Aleksandr Vulfov
45	(Russia)	Stanislav Utkin	71	(Russia)	Nikolai Poyarkov	72	(Russia)	Nikita Zhyoltikov
81	(Russia)	Kamil Salakhetdinov						
Midfielders
8	(Russia)	Georgi Makhatadze	10	(Russia)	Ivan Galanin	17	(Russia)	Ivan Sharov
23	(Russia)	Nikita Glushkov	69	(Russia)	Daniil Kulikov	70	(Russia)	Vladislav Karapuzov
77	(Russia)	Vladislav Ignatenko	83	(Russia)	Aleksei Mironov	89	(Russia)	Nikita Dorofeyev
Forwards
7	(Russia)	Roman Tugarev	19	(Russia)	Dmitri Rybchinsky	47	(Russia)	Aleksandr Dolgov
79	(Russia)	Maksim Chikanchi	90	(Russia)	Mikhail Ageyev	95	(Russia)	Islam Vagabov

=== Russian professional football league – west ===
==== Results ====
Home			Kazanka	Away		
Rnd	Date	Score	Opponent (City)	Score	Date	Rnd
26	2 June 2019	5 – 3	Leningradets (Saint Petersburg)	0 – 2	18 July 2018	1
2	26 July 2018	1 – 2	Pskov-747 (Pskov)	2 – 1	20 October 2018	14
15	28 October 2018	3 – 2	Kolomna (Kolomna)	1 – 0	3 August 2018	3
4	10 August 2018	2 – 1	Znamya Truda (Orekhovo-Zuyevo)	1 – 2	3 November 2018	16
17	11 November 2018	1 – 0	Luki-Energiya (Velikiye Luki)	2 – 1	17 August 2018	5
6	24 August 2018	2 – 0	FC Chertanovo-2 (Moscow)	5 – 2	5 April 2019	18
19	13 April 2019	5 – 0	Murom (Murom)	3 – 1	2 September 2018	7
8	9 September 2018	0 – 0	Dolgoprudny (Dolgoprudny)	3 – 2	20 April 2019	20
21	27 April 2019	1 – 2	Tekstilshchik (Ivanovo)	1 – 1	14 September 2018	9
10	22 September 2018	3 – 0	Veles (Moscow)	1 – 1	4 May 2019	22
23	11 May 2019	3 – 0	Torpedo (Vladimir)	1 – 1	30 September 2018	11
13	13 October 2018	2 – 1	Dnepr (Smolensk)	3 – 0	26 May 2019	25

== WFC Lokomotiv Moscow ==
WFC Lokomotiv Moscow
2018 season
- Chairman: Ilya Herkus
- Manager: Elena Fomina
- Stadium: Sapsan Arena
- Russian Football Championship: 6th
- Russian Cup: Semi-finals
- Top goalscorer: Anna Kozhnikova; Yana Sheina (14)
Home colours	Away colours	Third colours

The 2018 WFC Lokomotiv Moscow season will be the club's 1st season in the Russian Women's Football Championship following the club's relaunch in April 2018. WFC Lokomotiv Moscow also took part in the Russian Women's Cup.

=== Squad information ===
Players and squad numbers last updated on 1 September 2018.
Note: Flags indicate national team as has been defined under FIFA eligibility rules. Players may hold more than one non-FIFA nationality.

No	Nationality	Name	No	Nationality	Name	No	Nationality	Name
Goalkeepers
1	(Russia)	Kristina Fedorova	21	(Russia)	Yulia Grichenko	24	(Russia)	Viktoria Nosenko
Defenders
3	(Russia)	Anna Kozhnikova	4	(Russia)	Anastasiya Karandashova	8	(Russia)	Julia Zapotichnaya
18	(Russia)	Alina Myagkova	23	(Russia)	Ekaterina Bratko			
Midfielders
7	(Russia)	Lina Yakupova	12	(Russia)	Elina Samoylova	13	(Russia)	Maria Digurova
14	(Russia)	Veronika Kuropatkina	15	(Russia)	Ekaterina Frolova	16	(Russia)	Yana Sheina
17	(Russia)	Yana Khotyreva	19	(Russia)	Alena Ruzina	20	(Russia)	Kristina Frolova
Forwards
11	(Russia)	Kristina Cherkasova	22	(Russia)	Lyubov Yashchenko	26	(Russia)	Varvara Rubtsova

=== Russian Women's Football Championship ===
==== Results ====
Home			WFC Lokomotiv	Away		
Rnd	Date	Score	Opponent (City)	Score	Date	Rnd
1	21 April 2018	1 – 1	Yenisey (Krasnoyarsk)	1 – 1	21 August 2018	11
13	14 October 2018	7 – 1	Chertanovo (Moscow)	0 – 1	28 April 2018	2
3	4 May 2018	0 – 0	CSKA (Moscow)	1 – 1	10 August 2018	10
8	24 June 2018	0 – 1	Ryazan-VDV (Ryazan)	0 – 0	10 May 2018	4
5	17 May 2018	0 – 1	Kubanochka (Krasnodar)	1 – 0	23 October 2018	14
6	22 May 2018	2 – 0	Zvezda-2005 (Perm)	1 – 2	4 August 2018	9
12	10 September 2018	5 – 0	Torpedo (Izhevsk)	4 – 0	28 May 2018	7

=== Russian Women's Cup ===
Description	Round of 16	Quarter-Finals		Semi-finals	
Home/Away	Home	Away	Home	Away	Home
Date	18 June 2018	6 July 2018	28 July 2018	17 August 2018	20 September 2018
Opponent (City)	VTB (Moscow)	CSKA (Moscow)		Zvezda-2005 (Perm)	
Score	6 – 0	1 – 2	1 – 0	1 – 3	1 – 0
