= Dmitri Rybchinsky =

Russian footballer (born 1998)

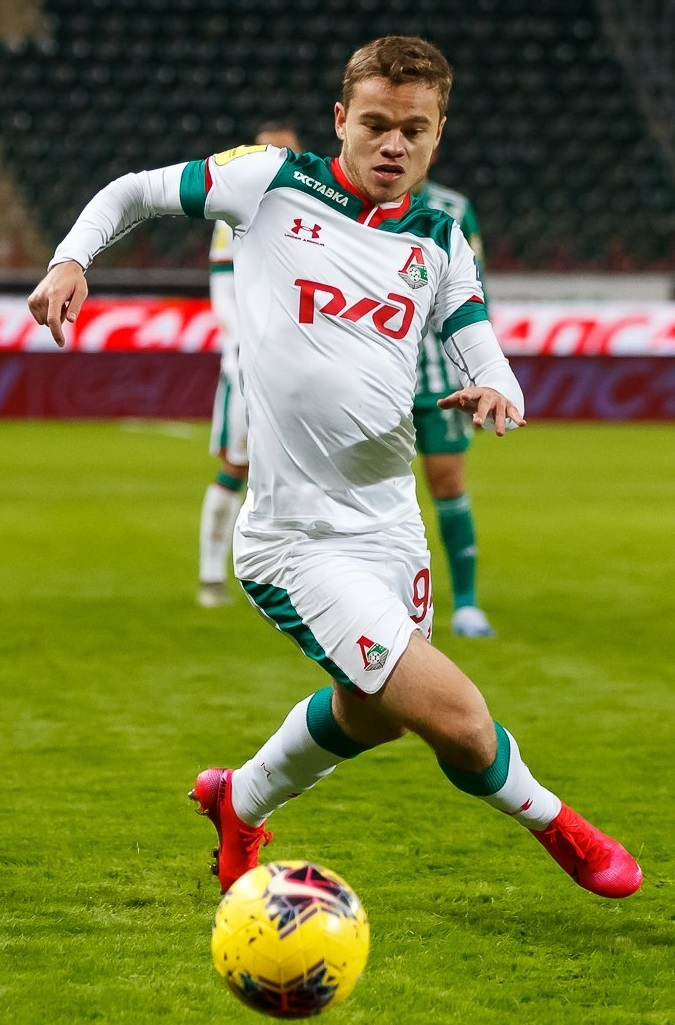
- Rybchinsky with Lokomotiv Moscow in 2020

Personal information
- Full name: Dmitri Dmitriyevich Rybchinsky
- Date of birth: 19 August 1998 (age 28)
- Place of birth: Moscow, Russia
- Height: 1.79 m (5 ft 10 in)
- Positions: Left winger; right winger

Team information
- Current team: Orenburg
- Number: 20

Youth career
- –2010: Nika Moscow
- 2011–2012: Torpedo Moscow
- 2012–2019: Lokomotiv Moscow

Senior career*
Years	Team	Apps	(Gls)
2017–2019	Kazanka	44	(4)
2019–2024	Lokomotiv Moscow	62	(2)
2022–2023	→ Pari NN (loan)	26	(2)
2024	Baltika Kaliningrad	11	(1)
2024–	Orenburg	59	(2)

International career^{‡}
2019	Russia U-20	3	(0)
2020	Russia U-21	2	(0)
- * Club domestic league appearances and goals as of 21 November 2026 ‡ National team caps and goals as of 17 November 2020

Dmitri Dmitriyevich Rybchinsky (Russian: Дми́трий Дми́триевич Рыбчи́нский; born 19 August 1998) is a Russian professional footballer who plays for Orenburg. He is deployed in multiple positions, as wide midfielder (both right and left) and as a right back.

== Club career ==
He made his debut in the Russian Professional Football League for Lokomotiv-Kazanka Moscow on 19 July 2017 in a game against Znamya Truda Orekhovo-Zuyevo.

He made his debut in the Russian Premier League for Lokomotiv Moscow on 15 July 2019 in a game against Rubin Kazan, as an 82nd-minute substitute for Rifat Zhemaletdinov.

On 16 June 2022, Rybchinsky was loaned to Pari NN for the 2022–23 season.

On 20 February 2024, Rybchinsky transferred to Baltika Kaliningrad.

On 16 June 2024, Rybchinsky signed with Orenburg.

== Honours ==
=== Club ===
Lokomotiv Moscow

- Russian Cup: 2020–21

== Career statistics ==
As of match played 21 November 2026

Club	Season	League			Cup		Europe		Other		Total	
Club	Season	Division	Apps	Goals	Apps	Goals	Apps	Goals	Apps	Goals	Apps	Goals
Kazanka Moscow	2017–18	Russian Second League	20	4	—		—		5 (Note: Appearances in the FNL Cup)	1	25	5
Kazanka Moscow	2018–19	Russian Second League	20	0	—		—		—		20	0
Kazanka Moscow	2019–20	Russian Second League	4	0	—		—		—		4	0
Kazanka Moscow	Total		44	4	0	0	0	0	5	1	49	5
Lokomotiv Moscow	2018–19	Russian Premier League	0	0	0	0	0	0	0	0	0	0
Lokomotiv Moscow	2019–20	Russian Premier League	7	0	1	0	0	0	0	0	8	0
Lokomotiv Moscow	2020–21	Russian Premier League	26	2	4	0	6 (Note: Appearances in the UEFA Champions League)	0	1 (Note: Appearances in the Russian Super Cup)	0	37	2
Lokomotiv Moscow	2021–22	Russian Premier League	21	0	1	0	4 (Note: Appearances in the UEFA Europa League)	0	1	0	27	0
Lokomotiv Moscow	2023–24	Russian Premier League	8	0	5	0	—		—		13	0
Lokomotiv Moscow	Total		62	2	11	0	10	0	2	0	85	2
Pari NN (loan)	2022–23	Russian Premier League	26	2	4	0	—		2 (Note: Appearances in Relegation play-offs)	0	32	2
Baltika Kaliningrad	2022–23	Russian Premier League	11	1	6	0	—		—		17	1
Orenburg	2024–25	Russian Premier League	25	1	6	0	—		—		31	1
Orenburg	2025–26	Russian Premier League	19	0	4	0	—		—		23	0
Orenburg	2026–27	Russian Premier League	15	1	4	0	—		—		19	1
Orenburg	Total		59	2	14	0	0	0	0	0	73	2
Career total			202	11	35	0	10	0	9	1	256	12
