= Daniil Kulikov =

Russian footballer

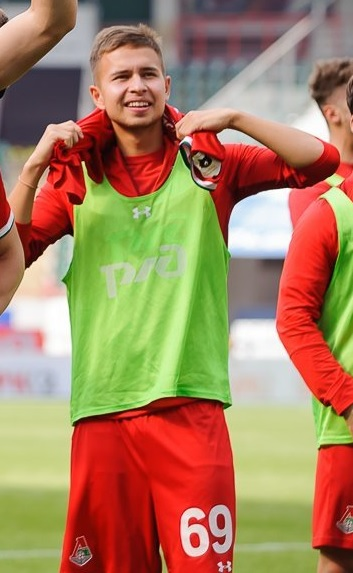
- Kulikov with Lokomotiv Moscow in 2019

Personal information
- Full name: Daniil Mikhailovich Kulikov
- Date of birth: 24 June 1998 (age 28)
- Place of birth: Reutov, Russia
- Height: 1.78 m (5 ft 10 in)
- Position: Defensive midfielder

Team information
- Current team: Pyunik
- Number: 25

Youth career
- 2016–2018: Lokomotiv Moscow

Senior career*
| Years | Team | Apps | (Gls) |
| 2017–2019 | Kazanka Moscow | 42 | (1) |
| 2017–2023 | Lokomotiv Moscow | 65 | (0) |
| 2024 | Rodina Moscow | 14 | (1) |
| 2024 | Dinamo Minsk | 12 | (1) |
| 2025– | Pyunik | 33 | (4) |

International career^{‡}
| 2020–2021 | Russia U21 | 4 | (0) |
- * Club domestic league appearances and goals as of 18 June 2026 ‡ National team caps and goals as of 31 March 2021

Daniil Mikhailovich Kulikov (Russian: Даниил Михайлович Куликов; born 24 June 1998) is a Russian football player who plays as a defensive midfielder for Pyunik.

== Club career ==
Kulikov made his debut in the Russian Professional Football League for Lokomotiv-Kazanka Moscow on 19 July 2017 in a game against Znamya Truda Orekhovo-Zuyevo.

He made his debut for the main squad of Lokomotiv Moscow on 31 October 2018 in a Russian Cup game against Yenisey Krasnoyarsk, as a 64th-minute substitute for Anton Miranchuk.

Kulikov made his Russian Premier League debut on 18 October 2019 in a game against Akhmat Grozny, substituting Luka Đorđević in the 32nd minute. He made his first appearance in the starting lineup on 1 December 2019 in a game against Dynamo Moscow.

On 14 February 2024, Kulikov moved to Rodina Moscow of the Russian First League.

== Honours ==
=== Club ===
Lokomotiv Moscow

- Russian Cup: 2018–19, 2020–21

== Career statistics ==
As of 25 May 2024

| Club | Season | League | | | Cup | | Continental | | Other | | Total | |
| Club | Season | Division | Apps | Goals | Apps | Goals | Apps | Goals | Apps | Goals | Apps | Goals |
|---|---|---|---|---|---|---|---|---|---|---|---|---|
| Kazanka Moscow | 2017–18 | Russian Second League | 23 | 0 | – | | – | | 5 (Note: Appearances in the FNL Cup) | 0 | 28 | 0 |
| Kazanka Moscow | 2018–19 | Russian Second League | 16 | 1 | – | | – | | – | | 16 | 1 |
| Kazanka Moscow | 2019–20 | Russian Second League | 3 | 0 | – | | – | | – | | 3 | 0 |
| Kazanka Moscow | Total | | 42 | 1 | 0 | 0 | 0 | 0 | 5 | 0 | 47 | 1 |
| Lokomotiv Moscow | 2017–18 | Russian Premier League | 0 | 0 | 0 | 0 | 0 | 0 | – | | 0 | 0 |
| Lokomotiv Moscow | 2018–19 | Russian Premier League | 0 | 0 | 1 | 0 | 0 | 0 | 0 | 0 | 1 | 0 |
| Lokomotiv Moscow | 2019–20 | Russian Premier League | 6 | 0 | 1 | 0 | 1 (Note: Appearances in the UEFA Champions League) | 0 | 0 | 0 | 8 | 0 |
| Lokomotiv Moscow | 2020–21 | Russian Premier League | 25 | 0 | 4 | 0 | 4 | 0 | 0 | 0 | 33 | 0 |
| Lokomotiv Moscow | 2021–22 | Russian Premier League | 17 | 0 | 0 | 0 | 2 (Note: Appearances in the UEFA Europa League) | 0 | 1 (Note: Appearance in the Russian Super Cup) | 0 | 20 | 0 |
| Lokomotiv Moscow | 2022–23 | Russian Premier League | 13 | 0 | 7 | 0 | – | | – | | 20 | 0 |
| Lokomotiv Moscow | 2023–24 | Russian Premier League | 4 | 0 | 3 | 0 | – | | – | | 7 | 0 |
| Lokomotiv Moscow | Total | | 65 | 0 | 16 | 0 | 7 | 0 | 1 | 0 | 89 | 0 |
| Rodina Moscow | 2023–24 | Russian First League | 14 | 1 | 1 | 0 | – | | – | | 15 | 1 |
| Career total | | | 121 | 2 | 17 | 0 | 7 | 0 | 6 | 0 | 151 | 2 |
