= Guilherme Marinato =

Footballer (born 1985)

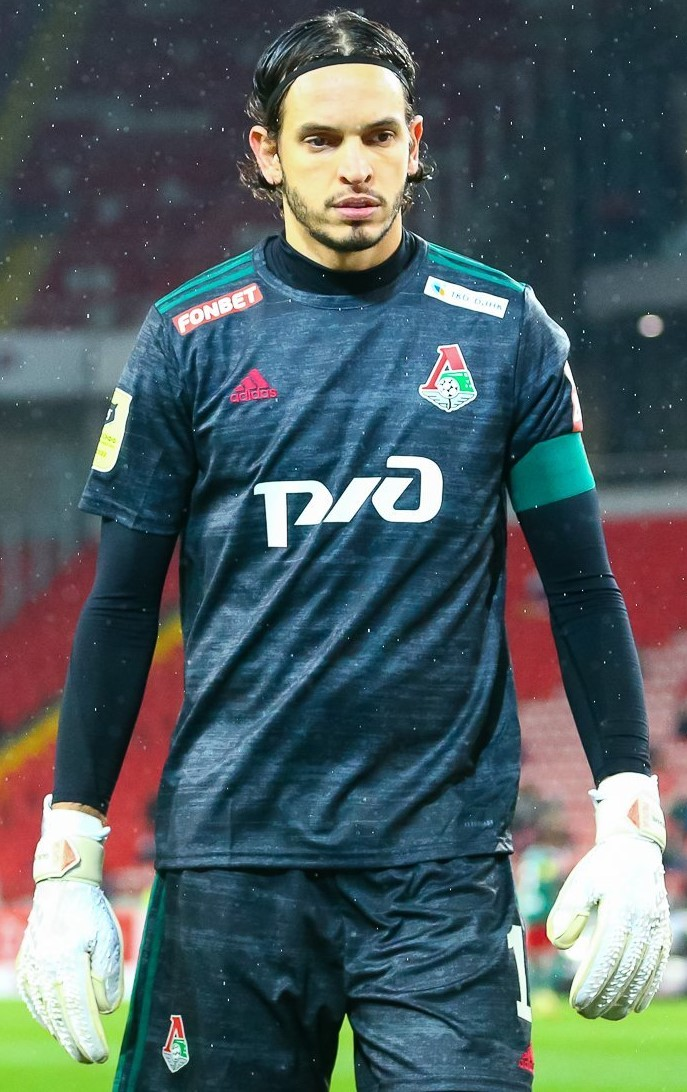
- Guilherme with Lokomotiv Moscow in 2021

Personal information
- Full name: Guilherme Alvim Marinato
- Date of birth: 12 December 1985 (age 40)
- Place of birth: Cataguases, Minas Gerais, Brazil
- Height: 1.98 m (6 ft 6 in)
- Position: Goalkeeper

Youth career
- 2001–2005: PSTC

Senior career*
Years	Team	Apps	(Gls)
2005–2007	Atlético Paranaense	18	(0)
2007–2024	Lokomotiv Moscow	306	(0)

International career^{‡}
2016–2021	Russia	19	(0)
- * Club domestic league appearances and goals as of 29 October 2022 ‡ National team caps and goals as of 7 September 2021

Guilherme Alvim Marinato (Russian: Гилье́рми Алви́н Марина́ту; (Note: According to orthographic transcription. The form Гилье́рме Алви́н Марина́то, however, is usually used. His Russian passport says Гилерме Алвим Маринато. Гилерме is also his name on the jersey.) born 12 December 1985) or simply Guilherme (Brazilian Portuguese: [ɡiˈʎɛʁmi]) is а former professional footballer who played as a goalkeeper. Born in Brazil, he represented the Russia national team.

== Club career ==
=== Atlético Paranaense ===
He made his professional debut for Atlético Paranaense in 0–1 defeat away to Nacional Atlético Clube in Campeonato Paranaense on 13 February 2005. Guilherme Marinato had risen through the ranks at the club and played 18 league matches and three Brazilian Cup games in the 2007 season.

=== Lokomotiv Moscow ===
In August 2007, Guilherme Marinato signed a five-year contract with FC Lokomotiv Moscow, becoming the first Brazilian goalkeeper in Russian football. He was handed the number 85 shirt. In 2007, he did not play a single game for the first team, and played only three games for the reserves.

Guilherme Marinato made his official first team debut on 12 July 2009, in Russian Premier League against Tom Tomsk (0–0 home draw), since then has been first-choice goalkeeper for Lokomotiv. In 2010, Guilherme changed his jersey number from 85 to 1. He played all 30 league matches during this season. On 19 August 2010 Guilherme made his UEFA Europa League debut against Lausanne-Sport.

During the winter camp at Cyprus in February 2013 Guilherme Marinato was appointed Lokomotiv's captain by manager Slaven Bilić. In July 2013 Guilherme Marinato won monthly contest among Lokomotiv's fans and was named Player of the month. He missed six month after cruciate ligaments injury in CSKA match on 28 July 2014 and returned to first-team football only next spring. Though, this season proved to be the most successful for Guilherme at Lokomotiv, as Loko claimed bronze medals.

In March 2015, his performances once more gained him the Lokomotiv Player of the month title.

On 23 May 2022, Guilherme signed a new contract with Lokomotiv until June 2024. He left Lokomotiv after that contract expired.

== International career ==
Guilherme Marinato was born and raised in Brazil. He gained Russian citizenship, and on 22 November 2015, he was called up to the Russia national football team for friendly games against Lithuania and France. He made his debut on 26 March 2016 at Otkrytiye Arena, replacing fellow debutant Stanislav Kritsyuk at half time in a 3–0 win, and became the first player naturalised from outside the former Soviet Union to feature for the Russian national team. He was included in the Russia squad in UEFA Euro 2016, but did not play a single match.

On 11 May 2018, he was included in Russia's extended 2018 FIFA World Cup squad as a back-up 5th goalkeeper. He was not included in the finalized World Cup squad. Following Igor Akinfeev's retirement from the national team after the World Cup, Guilherme became the first-choice goalkeeper for the team, competing with Andrey Lunyov. Despite featuring in 9 out of 10 UEFA Euro 2020 qualifiers with 6 clean sheets and just 8 goals conceded, as well as being named the 2020–21 RPL goalkeeper of the season, Guilherme was not called up for the final tournament in 2021.

== Personal life ==
Marinato is fluent in Russian. On 22 November 2015, Guilherme received Russian citizenship and became eligible to represent Russia at international level.

== Career statistics ==
=== Club ===
As of match played 25 May 2024

Club	Season	League			National cup (Note: Includes Copa do Brasil, Russian Cup)		Continental		Other		Total	
Club	Season	Division	Apps	Goals	Apps	Goals	Apps	Goals	Apps	Goals	Apps	Goals
Atlético Paranaense	2005	Série A	0	0	0	0	0	0	0	0	0	0
Atlético Paranaense	2006	Série A	0	0	0	0	—		0	0	0	0
Atlético Paranaense	2007	Série A	18	0	3	0	—		0	0	21	0
Atlético Paranaense	Total		18	0	3	0	0	0	0	0	21	0
Lokomotiv Moscow	2007	Russian Premier League	0	0	0	0	—		—		0	0
Lokomotiv Moscow	2008	Russian Premier League	0	0	0	0	—		—		0	0
Lokomotiv Moscow	2009	Russian Premier League	17	0	0	0	—		—		17	0
Lokomotiv Moscow	2010	Russian Premier League	30	0	1	0	2 (Note: Appearances in UEFA Europa League)	0	—		33	0
Lokomotiv Moscow	2011–12	Russian Premier League	40	0	2	0	8	0	—		50	0
Lokomotiv Moscow	2012–13	Russian Premier League	11	0	0	0	—		—		11	0
Lokomotiv Moscow	2013–14	Russian Premier League	6	0	0	0	—		—		6	0
Lokomotiv Moscow	2014–15	Russian Premier League	19	0	4	0	2	0	—		25	0
Lokomotiv Moscow	2015–16	Russian Premier League	30	0	0	0	8	0	1 (Note: Appearance in Russian Super Cup)	0	39	0
Lokomotiv Moscow	2016–17	Russian Premier League	29	0	4	0	—		—		33	0
Lokomotiv Moscow	2017–18	Russian Premier League	23	0	0	0	7	0	1	0	31	0
Lokomotiv Moscow	2018–19	Russian Premier League	30	0	5	0	6 (Note: Appearances in UEFA Champions League)	0	1	0	42	0
Lokomotiv Moscow	2019–20	Russian Premier League	24	0	0	0	5	0	1	0	30	0
Lokomotiv Moscow	2020–21	Russian Premier League	25	0	4	0	6	0	1	0	36	0
Lokomotiv Moscow	2021–22	Russian Premier League	19	0	0	0	4	0	1	0	24	0
Lokomotiv Moscow	2022–23	Russian Premier League	3	0	2	0	–		–		5	0
Lokomotiv Moscow	2023–24	Russian Premier League	0	0	5	0	–		–		5	0
Lokomotiv Moscow	Total		306	0	27	0	48	0	6	0	387	0
Career total			324	0	30	0	48	0	6	0	408	0

== Honours ==
Atlético Paranaense

- Campeonato Paranaense: 2005

Lokomotiv Moscow

- Russian Premier League: 2017–18
- Russian Cup: 2014–15, 2016–17, 2018–19, 2020–21
- Russian Super Cup: 2019

Individual

- Russian Premier League Goalkeeper of the Season: 2020–21
