= Stanislav Magkeyev =

Russian footballer

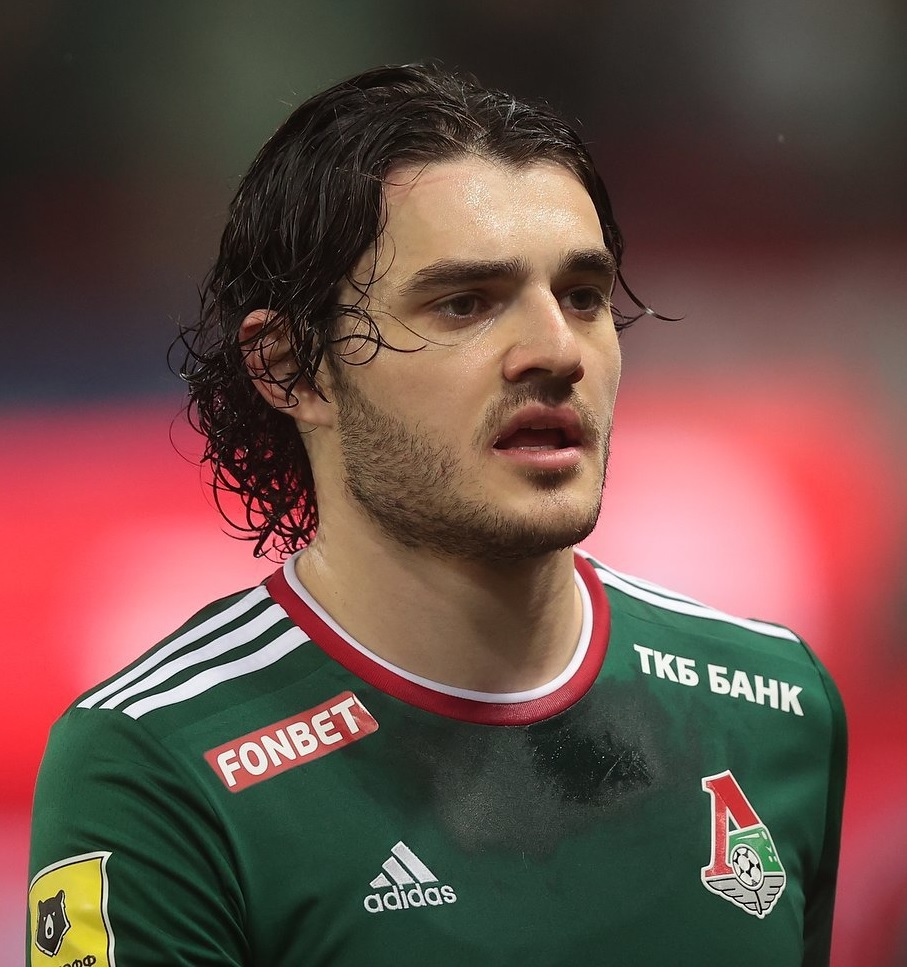
- Magkeyev with Lokomotiv Moscow in 2022

Personal information
- Full name: Stanislav Albertovich Magkeyev
- Date of birth: 27 March 1999 (age 27)
- Place of birth: Vladikavkaz, Russia
- Height: 1.87 m (6 ft 2 in)
- Positions: Defensive midfielder; centre-back

Team information
- Current team: Fakel Voronezh
- Number: 27

Youth career
- 2006–2014: Alania Vladikavkaz
- 2014–2017: Lokomotiv Moscow

Senior career*
| Years | Team | Apps | (Gls) |
| 2018–2019 | Kazanka Moscow | 21 | (4) |
| 2019–2024 | Lokomotiv Moscow | 63 | (0) |
| 2024–2025 | Pari Nizhny Novgorod | 19 | (0) |
| 2025– | Fakel Voronezh | 14 | (0) |

International career^{‡}
| 2020 | Russia U21 | 1 | (0) |
- * Club domestic league appearances and goals as of 16 May 2026 ‡ National team caps and goals as of 9 October 2020

Stanislav Albertovich Magkeyev (Russian: Станислав Альбертович Магкеев; born 27 March 1999) is a Russian football player of Ossetian descent who plays as a defensive midfielder or centre-back for Fakel Voronezh.

== Club career ==
Magkeyev made his debut in the Russian Professional Football League for Kazanka Moscow on 18 July 2018 in a game against Leningradets.

Magkeyev made his Russian Premier League debut for Lokomotiv Moscow on 26 May 2019 in a game against Ufa as a 90th-minute substitute for Fyodor Smolov. He made his first start on 18 October 2019 in a game against Akhmat Grozny.

Magkeyev suffered an ACL tear in his right knee on 25 September 2021, missing 6 months before returning to the squad in April 2022. On 8 May 2023, he suffered an ACL tear in his left knee, eventually returning to the squad in March 2024, but never making another appearance for Lokomotiv.

On 29 May 2024, Magkeev left Lokomotiv as his contract expired.

On 21 June 2024, Magkeyev signed a contract with Pari Nizhny Novgorod for one season, with an option for a second season. He left Pari on 19 June 2025.

On 18 July 2025, Magkeyev joined Fakel Voronezh, recently relegated to Russian First League, on a one-season deal.

== International career ==
He was called up to the Russia national football team for the first time for World Cup qualifiers against Croatia, Cyprus and Malta in September 2021.

== Career statistics ==
As of match played 13 October 2026

Appearances and goals by club, season and competition
| Club | Season | League | | | Cup | | Europe | | Other | | Total | |
| Club | Season | Division | Apps | Goals | Apps | Goals | Apps | Goals | Apps | Goals | Apps | Goals |
|---|---|---|---|---|---|---|---|---|---|---|---|---|
| Kazanka Moscow | 2017–18 | Russian Second League | 0 | 0 | – | | – | | – | | 0 | 0 |
| Kazanka Moscow | 2018–19 | Russian Second League | 19 | 4 | – | | – | | – | | 19 | 4 |
| Kazanka Moscow | 2019–20 | Russian Second League | 2 | 0 | – | | – | | – | | 2 | 0 |
| Kazanka Moscow | Total | | 21 | 4 | 0 | 0 | 0 | 0 | 0 | 0 | 21 | 4 |
| Lokomotiv Moscow | 2018–19 | Russian Premier League | 1 | 0 | 0 | 0 | 0 | 0 | – | | 1 | 0 |
| Lokomotiv Moscow | 2019–20 | Russian Premier League | 10 | 0 | 1 | 0 | 1 (Note: Appearances in UEFA Champions League) | 0 | – | | 12 | 0 |
| Lokomotiv Moscow | 2020–21 | Russian Premier League | 24 | 0 | 3 | 0 | 3 | 0 | 1 (Note: Appearances in Russian Super Cup) | 0 | 31 | 0 |
| Lokomotiv Moscow | 2021–22 | Russian Premier League | 9 | 0 | 0 | 0 | 1 (Note: Appearances in UEFA Europa League) | 0 | – | | 10 | 0 |
| Lokomotiv Moscow | 2022–23 | Russian Premier League | 19 | 0 | 7 | 0 | – | | – | | 26 | 0 |
| Lokomotiv Moscow | 2023–24 | Russian Premier League | 0 | 0 | 0 | 0 | – | | – | | 0 | 0 |
| Lokomotiv Moscow | Total | | 63 | 0 | 11 | 0 | 5 | 0 | 1 | 0 | 80 | 0 |
| Pari NN | 2024–25 | Russian Premier League | 19 | 0 | 2 | 0 | – | | 2 (Note: Appearances in relegation play-offs) | 0 | 23 | 0 |
| Fakel Voronezh | 2025–26 | Russian First League | 14 | 0 | 1 | 0 | – | | – | | 15 | 0 |
| Fakel Voronezh | 2026–27 | Russian Premier League | 0 | 0 | 1 | 0 | – | | – | | 1 | 0 |
| Fakel Voronezh | Total | | 14 | 0 | 2 | 0 | 0 | 0 | 0 | 0 | 16 | 0 |
| Career total | | | 117 | 4 | 15 | 0 | 5 | 0 | 3 | 0 | 140 | 4 |

== Honours ==
=== Club ===
Lokomotiv Moscow

- Russian Cup: 2020–21
