= Rifat Zhemaletdinov =

Russian footballer (born 1996)

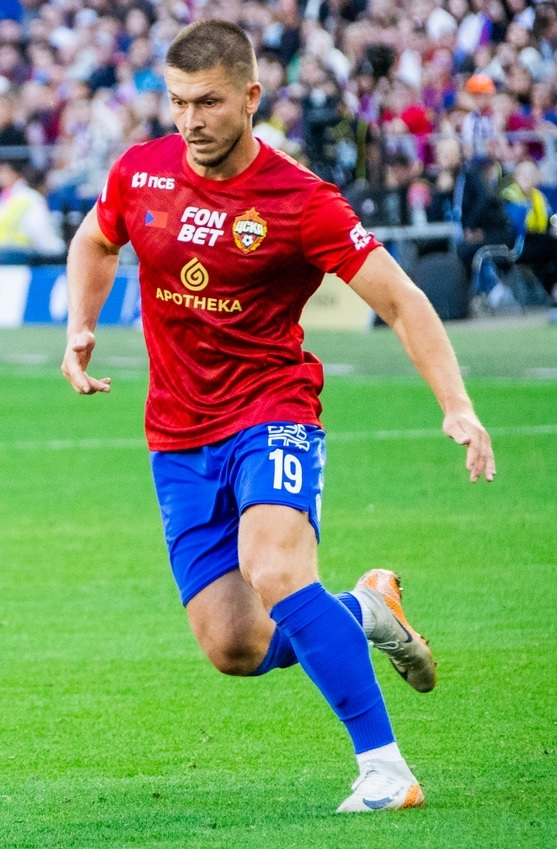
- Zhemaletdinov with CSKA Moscow in 2024

Personal information
- Full name: Rifat Maratovich Zhemaletdinov
- Date of birth: 20 September 1996 (age 30)
- Place of birth: Moscow, Russia
- Height: 1.84 m (6 ft 0 in)
- Position: Attacking midfielder

Youth career
- 2001–2016: Lokomotiv Moscow

Senior career*
Years	Team	Apps	(Gls)
2015–2016	Lokomotiv Moscow	5	(2)
2016–2018	Rubin Kazan	44	(2)
2018–2024	Lokomotiv Moscow	113	(20)
2024–2025	CSKA Moscow	24	(2)
2025–2026	Akhmat Grozny	13	(0)

International career^{‡}
2011–2012	Russia U-16	9	(2)
2013	Russia U-17	10	(1)
2014–2015	Russia U-19	9	(4)
2016–2017	Russia U-21	11	(4)
2021–	Russia	9	(1)
- * Club domestic league appearances and goals as of 26 April 2026 ‡ National team caps and goals as of 8 October 2021

Rifat Maratovich Zhemaletdinov (Russian: Рифат Маратович Жемалетдинов, Tatar: Рифат Марат улы Җамалетдинов, romanized: Rifat Marat ulı Camaletdinow; born 20 September 1996) is a Russian professional football player of Tatar origin who plays as an attacking midfielder.

== Club career ==
He was first called up to FC Lokomotiv Moscow senior squad in September 2015 for a Russian Cup game against FC Torpedo Vladimir. He made his Russian Premier League debut for Lokomotiv on 30 April 2016 in a game against FC Spartak Moscow.

On 21 May 2021, he extended his contract with Lokomotiv until 2024.

On 29 May 2024, Lokomotiv announced that Zhemaletdinov left the club as his contract expired.

On 9 July 2024, Zhemaletdinov signed a one-season contract (with an option for another year) with CSKA Moscow. On 25 June 2025, Zhemaletdinov left CSKA.

On 4 September 2025, Zhemaletdinov joined Akhmat Grozny. He left Akhmat in June 2026.

== International career ==
He won the 2013 UEFA European Under-17 Championship with Russia national under-17 football team, scoring a goal in the first group game against Ukraine. He also participated in 2013 FIFA U-17 World Cup with that team. Later he represented the Russia national under-19 football team in the 2015 UEFA European Under-19 Championship, in which Russia was the runner-up to Spain.

He was called up to the Russia national football team for the first time for UEFA Euro 2020 qualifying matches against Scotland and Cyprus, on 10 and 13 October 2019.

He made his debut for the senior team on 24 March 2021 in a 2022 FIFA World Cup qualifier against Malta.

On 11 May 2021, he was included in the preliminary extended 30-man squad for UEFA Euro 2020. On 2 June 2021, he was included in the final squad. He appeared in Russia's second game against Finland on 16 June as a second-half substitute in a 1–0 victory. He again appeared as a substitute for the last half-hour of the match on 21 June in the last group game against Denmark as Russia lost 1–4 and was eliminated.

He scored his first international goal on 4 September 2021 in a World Cup qualifier against Cyprus, establishing the final score in a 2–0 away victory.

== Career statistics ==
=== Club ===
As of match played 26 April 2026

Appearances and goals by club, season and competition
Club	Season	League			Cup		Europe		Other		Total	
Club	Season	Division	Apps	Goals	Apps	Goals	Apps	Goals	Apps	Goals	Apps	Goals
Lokomotiv Moscow	2015–16	Russian Premier League	5	2	0	0	1 (Note: Appearance in UEFA Europa League)	0	0	0	6	2
Rubin Kazan	2016–17	Russian Premier League	23	0	3	0	—		—		26	0
Rubin Kazan	2017–18	Russian Premier League	21	2	2	1	—		—		23	3
Rubin Kazan	Total		44	2	5	1	0	0	0	0	49	3
Lokomotiv Moscow	2018–19	Russian Premier League	13	1	6	1	2 (Note: Appearances in UEFA Champions League)	0	1 (Note: Appearance in Russian Super Cup)	0	22	2
Lokomotiv Moscow	2019–20	Russian Premier League	23	2	0	0	5	0	1	0	29	2
Lokomotiv Moscow	2020–21	Russian Premier League	22	3	4	0	3	0	1	0	30	3
Lokomotiv Moscow	2021–22	Russian Premier League	24	9	1	0	4	0	1	0	30	9
Lokomotiv Moscow	2022–23	Russian Premier League	11	0	1	0	—		—		12	0
Lokomotiv Moscow	2023–24	Russian Premier League	20	5	6	0	—		—		26	5
Lokomotiv Moscow	Total		113	20	18	1	15	0	4	0	150	21
CSKA Moscow	2024–25	Russian Premier League	24	2	5	0	—		—		29	2
Akhmat Grozny	2025–26	Russian Premier League	13	0	3	1	—		—		16	1
Career total			199	26	31	3	15	0	4	0	249	29

=== International ===
As of match played 8 October 2021

Appearances and goals by national team and year
National team	Year	Apps	Goals
Russia	2021	9	1
Total		9	1

=== International goals ===
Scores and results list Russia's goal tally first.

No.	Date	Venue	Opponent	Score	Result	Competition
1.	4 September 2021	GSP Stadium, Strovolos, Cyprus	Cyprus	2–0	2–0	2022 FIFA World Cup qualification

== Honours ==
=== Club ===
Lokomotiv Moscow

- Russian Cup: 2018–19, 2020–21
- Russian Super Cup: 2019

CSKA Moscow

- Russian Cup: 2024–25

=== National ===
Russia U17

- UEFA European Under-17 Championship: 2013

Russia U19

- UEFA European Under-19 Championship runner-up: 2015
