= Vladislav Bezborodov =

Russian footballer and referee

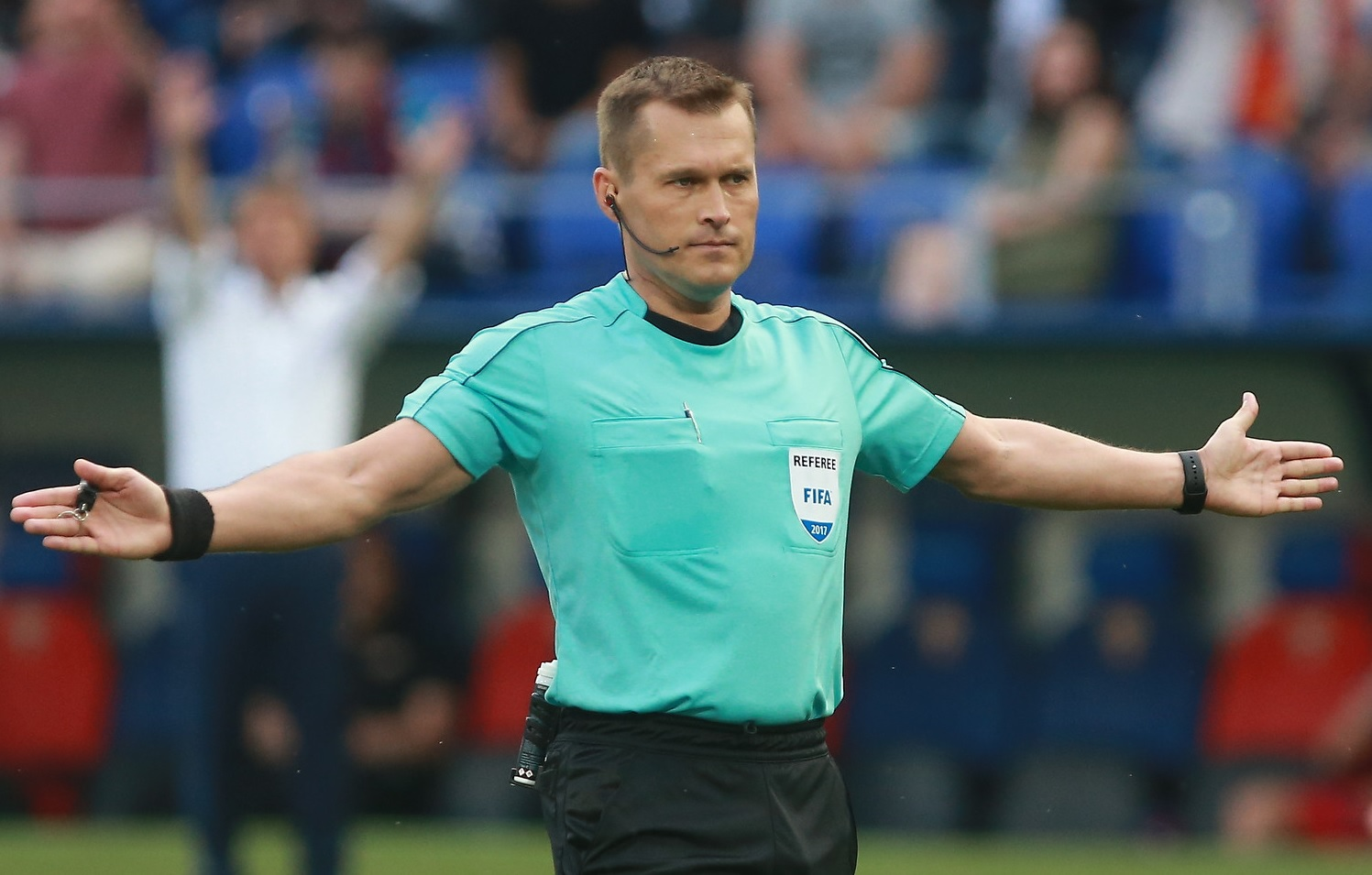
- Bezborodov in 2017

Personal information
- Full name: Vladislav Yuryevich Bezborodov
- Date of birth: 15 January 1973 (age 53)
- Place of birth: Leningrad, Russian SFSR, USSR
- Height: 1.76 m (5 ft 9 1/2 in)
- Positions: Forward; midfielder

Senior career*
| Years | Team | Apps | (Gls) |
| 1991 | Zenit St. Petersburg | 5 | (0) |
| 1998 | Dynamo St. Petersburg | 40 | (9) |
| 1999–2001 | Ventspils | 48 | (27) |
| 2001 | Dinamo Minsk | 5 | (0) |
| 2001 | Shakhtyor Soligorsk | 12 | (6) |
| 2002 | Torpedo-MAZ Minsk | 22 | (6) |
- * Club domestic league appearances and goals

Vladislav Yuryevich Bezborodov (Russian: Владислав Юрьевич Безбородов; born 15 January 1973) is a Russian professional football referee and former footballer.

== Playing career ==
Bezborodov played for Zenit St. Petersburg, Dynamo St. Petersburg, Dinamo Minsk, and Ventspils. He took a six-year break from football after five matches for Zenit in 1991 to study in the United States, where he earned a degree in sports management and business administration. He made his return to Russia in 1998 with Dynamo St. Petersburg in the Russian Second Division.

== Refereeing career ==
Bezborodov became a FIFA referee in 2009. He was selected as one of three Russian referees in the summer of 2010, alongside Maksim Layushkin and Stanislav Sukhina, to work UEFA Champions League and Europa League matches for the upcoming season. Starting in 2012, he officiated in 2014 World Cup qualifying, taking charge of the match between the Czech Republic and Bulgaria.

At the time of the 2022/23 season, the Russian Football Union honoured him as the best referee. This recognition based on his performance in 26 matches conducted during the championship and the Russian Cup.

== Family and personal life ==
Bezborodov's father Yuri Bezborodov played professionally in 1960s and 1970s for FC Irtysh Omsk and FC Dynamo Leningrad.
