= Sergey Ivanov (referee) =

Russian football referee

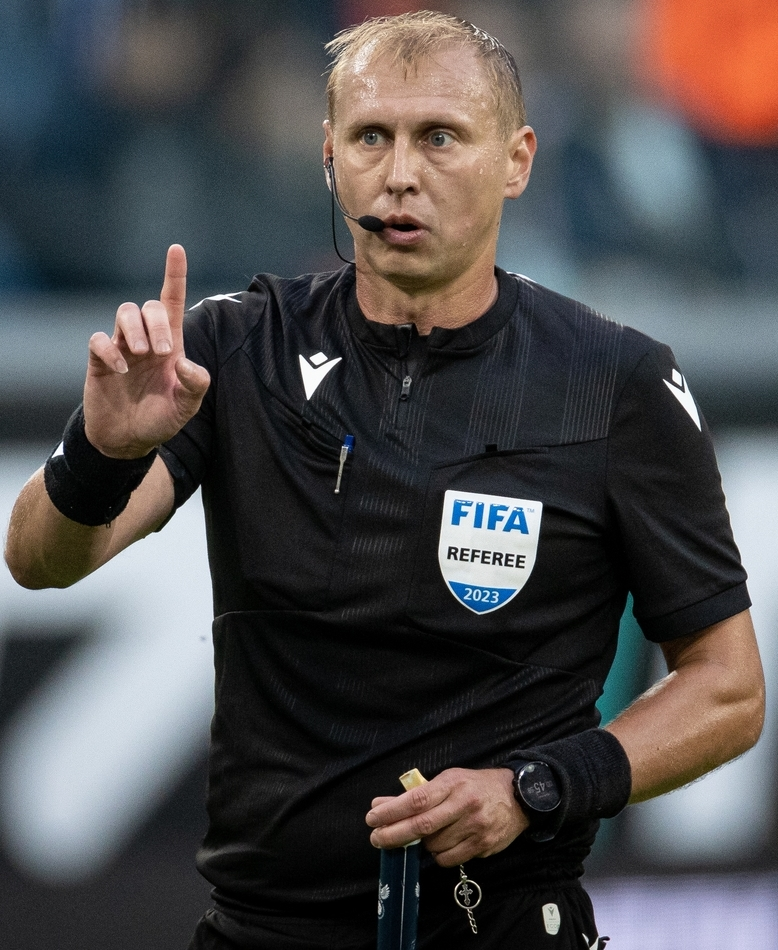
- Full name: Sergey Sergeyevich Ivanov
- Born: 5 June 1984 (age 42); Rostov-on-Don, Russian SFSR, Soviet Union

Domestic
| Years | League | Role |
| 2008–2009 | PFL | Assistant referee |
| 2009–2013 | PFL | Referee |
| 2011–2015 | FNL | Referee |
| 2012– | RFPL | Referee |

International
| Years | League | Role |
| 2014- | FIFA | Referee |

Sergey Sergeyevich Ivanov (Russian: Сергей Сергеевич Иванов; born 5 June 1984) is a Russian football referee. He lives in Rostov-on-Don.

He has been a FIFA referee since 2014.
