= Mikhail Vilkov =

Russian footballer and referee

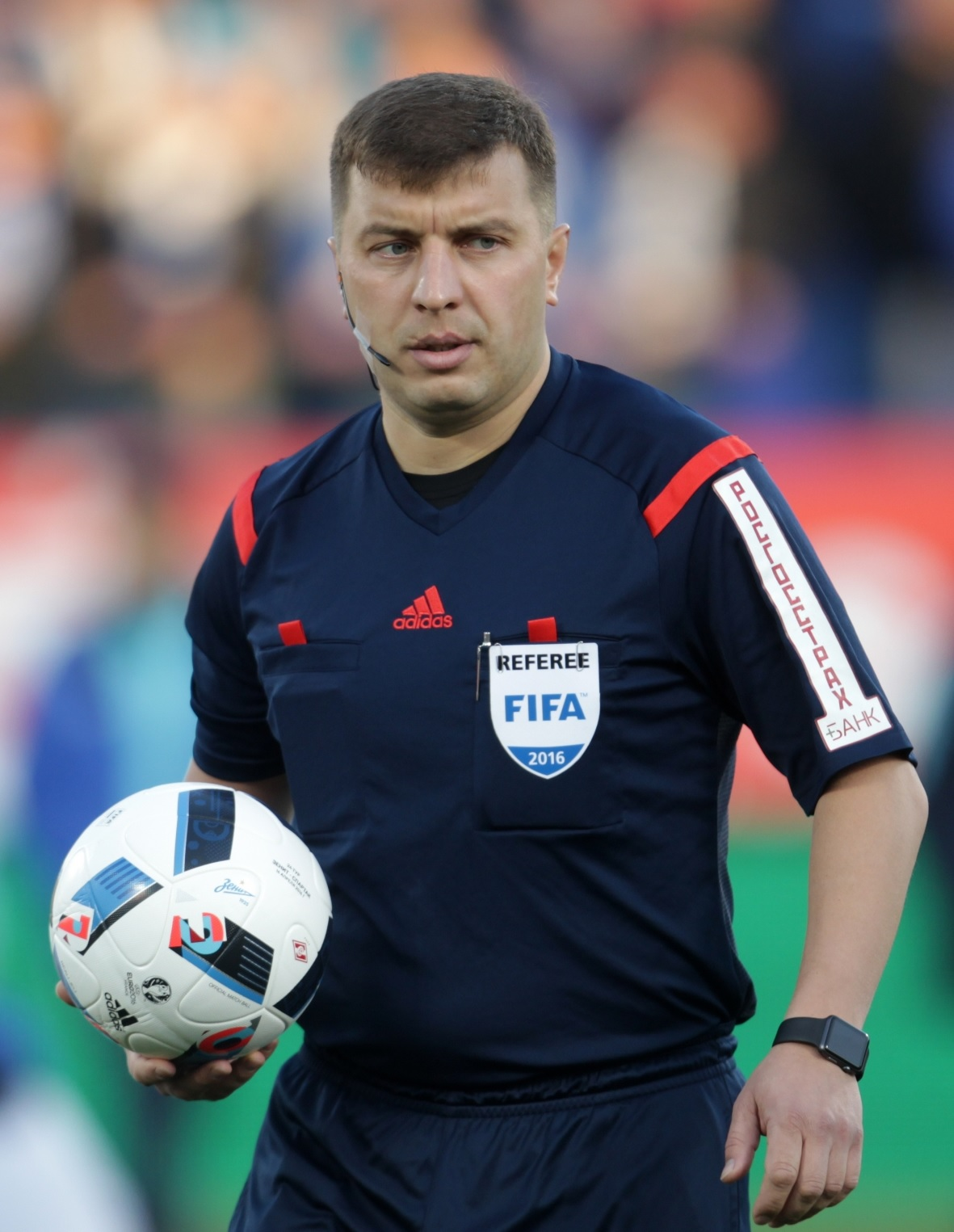
- Vilkov in 2016
- Full name: Mikhail Fyodorovich Vilkov
- Born: 10 July 1979 (age 47); Gorky, Russian SFSR

Domestic
| Years | League | Role |
| 2005–2011 | PFL | Referee |
| 2008–2019 | FNL | Referee |
| 2010–2021 | Russian Premier League | Referee |

International
| Years | League | Role |
| 2012–2018 | FIFA | Referee |

Mikhail Fyodorovich Vilkov (Russian: Михаил Фёдорович Вилков; born 10 July 1979) is a Russian former professional football referee.

He was a FIFA referee from 2012 to 2018, he was not included in the FIFA International Referees List for 2019 or 2020. On 19 April 2021, the Referee Committee of the Russian Football Union announced that he has been banned from refereeing for life.

He played football in the Russian Amateur Football League from 1997 to 1999.
