= 2019–20 FC Lokomotiv Moscow season =

FC Lokomotiv Moscow
- Chairman: Vasili Kiknadze
- Manager: Yury Semin
- Stadium: RZD Arena
- Russian Premier Liga: 2nd
- Super Cup: Winners
- Russian Cup: Round of 32
- UEFA Champions League: Group stage
- Top goalscorer: League: Grzegorz Krychowiak (8 goals); All: Grzegorz Krychowiak; Aleksei Miranchuk (9 each)
Home colours	Away colours	Third colours

The 2019–20 FC Lokomotiv Moscow season was the club's 28th season in the Russian Premier League, the highest tier of the Russian football league system. Lokomotiv Moscow also took part in the Russian Cup and the Champions League. Lokomotiv also contested the Russian Super Cup.

== First team squad ==
=== Information ===
Players and squad numbers last updated on 12 August 2019.
Note: Flags indicate national team as has been defined under FIFA eligibility rules. Players may hold more than one non-FIFA nationality.

No.	Name	Nationality	Position	Date of Birth (Age)	Signed from	Since
Goalkeepers
1	Guilherme	(Russia)	GK	12 December 1985 (age 40)	(Brazil) Atlético Paranaense	2007
30	Nikita Medvedev	(Russia)	GK	14 December 1994 (age 31)	Rostov	2017
77	Anton Kochenkov	(Russia)	GK	2 April 1987 (age 39)	Mordovia Saransk	2015
Defenders
2	Dmitri Zhivoglyadov	(Russia)	DF	29 May 1994 (age 32)	Ufa	2019
3	Brian Idowu	(Nigeria)	DF	18 May 1992 (age 34)	Amkar Perm	2018
5	Benedikt Höwedes	(Germany)	DF	29 February 1988 (age 38)	(Germany) Schalke 04	2018
14	Vedran Ćorluka	(Croatia)	DF	5 February 1986 (age 40)	(England) Tottenham Hotspur	2012
27	Murilo	(Brazil)	DF	27 March 1997 (age 29)	(Brazil) Cruzeiro	2019
28	Boris Rotenberg	(Finland)	DF	19 May 1986 (age 40)	Dynamo Moscow	2016
33	Solomon Kvirkvelia	(Georgia (country))	DF	6 February 1992 (age 34)	Rubin Kazan	2017
84	Mikhail Lysov	(Russia)	DF	29 January 1998 (age 28)	Youth system	2014
Midfielders
6	Dmitri Barinov	(Russia)	MF	11 January 1996 (age 30)	Youth system	2013
7	Grzegorz Krychowiak	(Poland)	MF	29 January 1990 (age 36)	(France) Paris Saint-Germain	2018
8	Jefferson Farfán	(Peru)	MF	26 October 1984 (age 41)	(United Arab Emirates) Al Jazira	2017
11	Anton Miranchuk	(Russia)	MF	17 October 1995 (age 30)	Youth system	2012
18	Aleksandr Kolomeytsev	(Russia)	MF	21 February 1989 (age 37)	Amkar Perm	2015
20	Vladislav Ignatyev	(Russia)	MF	20 January 1987 (age 39)	Kuban Krasnodar	2016
23	João Mário	(Portugal)	MF	19 January 1993 (age 33)	(Italy) Inter	2019
31	Maciej Rybus	(Poland)	MF	19 August 1989 (age 37)	(France) Lyon	2017
59	Aleksei Miranchuk	(Russia)	MF	17 October 1995 (age 30)	Youth system	2012
67	Roman Tugarev	(Russia)	MF	22 July 1998 (age 28)	Youth system	2016
Forwards
9	Fyodor Smolov	(Russia)	FW	9 February 1990 (age 36)	Krasnodar	2018
17	Rifat Zhemaletdinov	(Russia)	FW	20 September 1996 (age 29)	Rubin Kazan	2018
19	Eder	(Portugal)	FW	22 December 1987 (age 38)	(France) Lille	2017
22	Luka Đorđević	(Montenegro)	FW	9 July 1994 (age 32)	Zenit Saint Petersburg	2019

== Transfers ==
=== Arrivals ===
Permanent transfer
Name	Nationality	Position	From	Fee	Date	Source
Dmitri Zhivoglyadov	(Russia)	DF	Ufa	Undisclosed (~ €2,500,000)	11 June 2019	
Murilo	(Brazil)	DF	(Brazil) Cruzeiro	Undisclosed (~ €2,500,000)	18 June 2019	
Luka Đorđević	(Montenegro)	FW	Zenit Saint Petersburg	Undisclosed (~ €2,000,000)	12 August 2019	
Permanent transfer, originally on loan
Name	Nationality	Position	From	Fee	Date	Source
Grzegorz Krychowiak	(Poland)	MF	(France) Paris Saint-Germain	Undisclosed (~ €12,000,000)	3 July 2019	
In on loan
Name	Nationality	Position	From	Date	Until	Source
João Mário	(Portugal) (Angola)	MF	(Italy) Inter	27 August 2019	End of season	
Returned after loan
Name		Nationality	Position	From		Source

=== Departures ===
Permanent transfer
Name	Nationality	Position	To	Fee	Date	Source
Igor Denisov	(Russia)	MF	Retired		27 May 2019	
Taras Mykhalyk	(Ukraine)	DF	Free transfer		1 June 2019	
Dmitri Tarasov	(Russia)	MF	Free transfer		30 June 2019	
Manuel Fernandes	(Portugal) (Cape Verde)	MF	Free transfer		30 June 2019	
Permanent transfer, originally on loan
Name	Nationality	Position	To	Fee	Date	Source
Vitaliy Denisov	(Uzbekistan)	DF	Rubin Kazan	Free Transfer	20 June 2019	
Alan Kasaev	(Russia)	MF	Free transfer		30 June 2019	
Arshak Koryan	(Russia)	MF	Free transfer		30 June 2019	
Igor Portnyagin	(Russia)	FW	Free transfer		30 June 2019	
Timofei Margasov	(Russia)	DF	Free transfer		30 June 2019	
Out on loan
Name	Nationality	Position	To	Date	Until	Source
Returned after loan
Name		Nationality	Position	To		Source
Khvicha Kvaratskhelia		(Georgia (country))	MF	(Georgia (country)) Rustavi		

== Friendlies ==
=== Pre-season ===
v

v

== Competitions ==
=== Overview ===
Competition	Started round	Final round	First match	Last match	G	W	D	L	GF	GA	GD	Win %
Super Cup	Final		6 July 2019		1	1	0	0	3	2	+1	100.0%
Premier League			14 July 2019	22 July 2020	30	16	9	5	41	29	+12	
Russian Cup	Round of 32		25 September 2019		1	0	1	0	1	1	0	
Champions League	Group stage		18 September 2019	11 December 2019	6	1	0	5	4	11	−7	
Total					38	18	10	10	49	43	+6	

=== Russian Super Cup ===
6 July 2019	Lokomotiv Moscow	3–2	Zenit Saint Petersburg	Moscow
MSK (UTC+3)	Smolov 6'; Al. Miranchuk 78' 78'	Summary	Azmoun 45+' 52'	Stadium: VTB Arena; Attendance: 21,382; Referee: Sergey Lapochkin

=== Russian Premier Liga ===
==== League table ====
Pos	Team	Pld	W	D	L	GF	GA	GD	Pts	Qualification or relegation
1	Zenit Saint Petersburg (C)	30	22	6	2	65	18	+47	72	Qualification for the Champions League group stage
2	Lokomotiv Moscow	30	16	9	5	41	29	+12	57	Qualification for the Champions League group stage
3	Krasnodar	30	14	10	6	49	30	+19	52	Qualification for the Champions League play-off round
4	CSKA Moscow	30	14	8	8	43	29	+14	50	Qualification for the Europa League group stage
5	Rostov	30	12	9	9	45	50	−5	45	Qualification for the Europa League third qualifying round

Source: Russian Premier Liga, Soccerway
Rules for classification: 1) Points; 2) Head-to-head points; 3) Head-to-head matches won; 4) Head-to-head goal difference; 5) Head-to-head goals scored; 6) Matches won; 7) Goal difference; 8) Goals scored; 9) Play-off.
(C) Champions

==== Results by round ====
Round	1	2	3	4	5	6	7	8	9	10	11	12	13	14	15	16	17	18	19	20	21	22	23	24	25	26	27	28	29	30
Ground	H	H	A	A	H	A	A	H	A	A	H	H	A	H	A	H	A	H	A	A	H	A	H	A	H	H	A	H	H	A
Result	D	W	L	W	W	W	D	L	W	W	W	W	W	L	D	D	W	L	L	D	W	W	W	W	D	D	D	D	W	W
Position	7	5	9	4	4	2	4	5	5	5	2	1	1	3	3	2	2	2	5	5	4	2	2	2	2	2	2	2	2	2

Updated to match(es) played on 22 July 2020. Source: Russian Premier League
A = Away; H = Home; W = Win; D = Draw; L = Loss

==== Matches ====
14 July 2019 1	Lokomotiv Moscow	1–1	Rubin Kazan	Moscow
20:00 MSK (UTC+3)	Al. Miranchuk 66'	Summary	Kvaratskhelia 76'	Stadium: RZD Arena; Attendance: 10,732; Referee: Mikhail Vilkov

21 July 2019 2	Lokomotiv Moscow	2–1	Tambov	Moscow
16:30 MSK (UTC+3)	Eder 31'; Ignatyev 33'	Summary	Kostyukov 6'	Stadium: RZD Arena; Attendance: 10,187; Referee: Stanislav Vasilyev

28 July 2019 3	CSKA Moscow	1–0	Lokomotiv Moscow	Moscow
19:00 MSK (UTC+3)	Chalov 42' (pen.)	Summary		Stadium: VEB Arena; Attendance: 27,897; Referee: Vladislav Bezborodov

4 August 2019 4	Krylya Sovetov Samara	1–2	Lokomotiv Moscow	Samara
16:30 MSK (UTC+3)	Sobolev 88'	Summary	Smolov 15'; Krychowiak 90+'	Stadium: Samara Arena; Attendance: 22,459; Referee: Evgeny Turbin

11 August 2019 5	Lokomotiv Moscow	4–0	Ural Yekaterinburg	Moscow
18:30 MSK (UTC+3)	Smolov 17'; Zhemaletdinov 28'; Krychowiak 76'; Al. Miranchuk 78'	Summary		Stadium: RZD Arena; Attendance: 14,181; Referee: Nikolay Voloshin

18 August 2019 6	Dynamo Moscow	1–2	Lokomotiv Moscow	Moscow
19:00 MSK (UTC+3)	Philipp 3'	Summary	Al. Miranchuk 28' (pen.); An. Miranchuk 82'	Stadium: VTB Arena; Attendance: 17,837; Referee: Vasili Kazartsev

24 August 2019 7	Krasnodar	1–1	Lokomotiv Moscow	Krasnodar
19:00 MSK (UTC+3)	Suleymanov 42'	Summary	Krychowiak 5'	Stadium: Krasnodar Stadium; Attendance: 31,231; Referee: Vladislav Bezborodov

31 August 2019 8	Lokomotiv Moscow	1–2	Rostov	Moscow
16:30 MSK (UTC+3)	An. Miranchuk 81'	Summary	Shomurodov 41', 58'	Stadium: RZD Arena; Attendance: 19,356; Referee: Sergey Lapochkin

14 September 2019 9	Sochi	0–1	Lokomotiv Moscow	Sochi
19:00 MSK (UTC+3)		Summary	Krychowiak 20'	Stadium: Fisht Olympic Stadium; Attendance: 13,900; Referee: Igor Panin

22 September 2019 10	Orenburg	2–3	Lokomotiv Moscow	Orenburg
11:30 MSK (UTC+3)	Rogić 69'; Kulishev 90+2'	Summary	Barinov 10'; Smolov 48' (pen.); Eder 88'	Stadium: Gazovik Stadium; Attendance: 4,854; Referee: Sergey Ivanov

28 September 2019 11	Lokomotiv Moscow	1–0	Zenit Saint Petersburg	Moscow
19:00 MSK (UTC+3)	Krychowiak 48'	Summary		Stadium: RZD Arena; Attendance: 21,598; Referee: Mikhail Vilkov

6 October 2019 12	Lokomotiv Moscow	2–1	Arsenal Tula	Moscow
14:00 MSK (UTC+3)	Eder 9'; Al. Miranchuk 45+2' (pen.)	Summary	Kangwa 11'	Stadium: RZD Arena; Attendance: 11,204; Referee: Sergey Lapochkin

18 October 2019 13	Akhmat Grozny	0–2	Lokomotiv Moscow	Grozny
19:30 MSK (UTC+3)		Summary	Kolomeytsev 23'; João Mário 86'	Stadium: Akhmat-Arena; Attendance: 13,776; Referee: Stanislav Vasilyev

27 October 2019 14	Lokomotiv Moscow	0–3	Spartak Moscow	Moscow
16:30 MSK (UTC+3)		Summary	Ponce 57'; Larsson 79', 81'	Stadium: RZD Arena; Attendance: 22,863; Referee: Aleksey Eskov

2 November 2019 15	Ufa	1–1	Lokomotiv Moscow	Ufa
14:00 MSK (UTC+3)	Bizjak 72' (pen.)	Summary	Eder 59'	Stadium: Neftyanik Stadium; Attendance: 6,157; Referee: Evgeny Turbin

10 November 2019 16	Lokomotiv Moscow	1–1	Krasnodar	Moscow
19:00 MSK (UTC+3)	Krychowiak 41'	Summary	Berg 45+2'	Stadium: RZD Arena; Attendance: 17,612; Referee: Vladislav Bezborodov

22 November 2019 17	Tambov	2–3	Lokomotiv Moscow	Saransk
19:30 MSK (UTC+3)	Obukhov 39'; Kostyukov 47'	Summary	Krychowiak 29', 56'; Oyewole 34' (o.g.)	Stadium: Mordovia Arena; Attendance: 4,038; Referee: Pavel Kukuyan
Note: Match played at the Mordovia Arena in Saransk instead of Tambov's regular Spartak Stadium.

1 December 2019 18	Lokomotiv Moscow	1–2	Dynamo Moscow	Moscow
16:30 MSK (UTC+3)	Al. Miranchuk 38' (pen.)	Summary	Philipp 23', 49' (pen.)	Stadium: RZD Arena; Attendance: 17,739; Referee: Sergei Karasev

6 December 2019 19	Arsenal Tula	4–0	Lokomotiv Moscow	Tula
19:30 MSK (UTC+3)	Gorbatenko 48'; Lutsenko 63', 78'; Čaušić 83'	Summary		Stadium: Arsenal Stadium; Attendance: 10,284; Referee: Sergey Ivanov

29 February 2020 20	Zenit Saint Petersburg	0–0	Lokomotiv Moscow	Saint Petersburg
19:00 MSK (UTC+3)		Summary		Stadium: Krestovsky Stadium; Attendance: 51,463; Referee: Evgeny Turbin

8 March 2020 21	Lokomotiv Moscow	1–0	Akhmat Grozny	Moscow
19:00 MSK (UTC+3)	Eder 32'	Summary		Stadium: RZD Arena; Attendance: 14,689; Referee: Kirill Levnikov

15 March 2020 22	Rostov	1–3	Lokomotiv Moscow	Rostov-on-Don
19:00 MSK (UTC+3)	Popov 64' (pen.)	Summary	Pesyakov 34' (o.g.); Zhemaletdinov 38'; Krychowiak 42'	Stadium: Rostov Arena; Attendance: 30,127; Referee: Mikhail Vilkov

21 June 2020 23	Lokomotiv Moscow	1–0	Orenburg	Moscow
17:30 MSK (UTC+3)	Al. Miranchuk 38'	Summary		Stadium: RZD Arena; Attendance: 1,800; Referee: Stanislav Vasilyev
Note: Match originally scheduled for 21 March, but postponed on 17 March due to the COVID-19 pandemic.

27 June 2020 24	Rubin Kazan	0–2	Lokomotiv Moscow	Kazan
17:30 MSK (UTC+3)		Summary	Al. Miranchuk 23', 29' (pen.)	Stadium: Kazan Arena; Attendance: 4,189; Referee: Nikolay Voloshin
Note: Match originally scheduled for 5 April, but postponed on 17 March due to the COVID-19 pandemic.

30 June 2020 25	Lokomotiv Moscow	1–1	Krylya Sovetov Samara	Moscow
18:00 MSK (UTC+3)	Al. Miranchuk 90+5'	Summary	Radonjić 14'	Stadium: RZD Arena; Attendance: 2,700; Referee: Aleksey Sukhoy
Note: Match originally scheduled for 12 April, but postponed on 1 April due to the COVID-19 pandemic.

4 July 2020 26	Lokomotiv Moscow	0–0	Sochi	Moscow
20:30 MSK (UTC+3)		Summary		Stadium: RZD Arena; Attendance: 1,707; Referee: Aleksei Matyunin
Note: Match originally scheduled for 19 April, but postponed on 1 April due to the COVID-19 pandemic.

8 July 2020 27	Spartak Moscow	1–1	Lokomotiv Moscow	Moscow
20:30 MSK (UTC+3)	Ponce 38'	Summary	Al. Miranchuk 43' (pen.)	Stadium: Otkritie Arena; Attendance: 3,754; Referee: Sergey Lapochkin
Note: Match originally scheduled for 26 April, but postponed on 1 April due to the COVID-19 pandemic.

12 July 2020 28	Lokomotiv Moscow	1–1	Ufa	Moscow
16:30 MSK (UTC+3)	Farfán 81'	Summary	Fomin 39' (pen.)	Stadium: RZD Arena; Attendance: 1,239; Referee: Vladislav Bezborodov
Note: Match originally scheduled for 3 May, but postponed on 1 April due to the COVID-19 pandemic.

16 July 2020 29	Lokomotiv Moscow	2–1	CSKA Moscow	Moscow
20:30 MSK (UTC+3)	Al. Miranchuk 33' (pen.), 90+2' (pen.)	Summary	Vlašić 71'	Stadium: RZD Arena; Attendance: 2,527; Referee: Evgeny Turbin
Note: Match originally scheduled for 10 May, but postponed on 1 April due to the COVID-19 pandemic.

22 July 2020 30	Ural Yekaterinburg	0–1	Lokomotiv Moscow	Yekaterinburg
19:00 MSK (UTC+3)		Summary	An. Miranchuk 45+1'	Stadium: Central Stadium; Attendance: 3,458; Referee: Stanislav Vasilyev
Note: Match originally scheduled for 17 May, but postponed on 1 April due to the COVID-19 pandemic.

=== Russian Cup ===
25 September 2019 Round of 32	Baltika Kaliningrad	1–1 (a.e.t.) (4–1 p)	Lokomotiv Moscow	Kaliningrad
21:30 MSK (UTC+3)	Kazayev 74'	Summary	Eder 32'	Stadium: Kaliningrad Stadium; Attendance: 17,807; Referee: Stanislav Vasilev
	Penalties
	Markin (penalty scored); Kamilov (penalty scored); Alshin (penalty scored); Glushkov (penalty scored)		(penalty missed) Eder; (penalty scored) Murilo; (penalty missed) Dorofeyev

=== Champions League ===
Lokomotiv have qualified directly for the group stage of the 2019–20 UEFA Champions League League after coming second in the 2018–19 Russian Premier League.

==== Group stage ====
Pos	Team	Pld	W	D	L	GF	GA	GD	Pts	Qualification
1	(Italy) Juventus	6	5	1	0	12	4	+8	16	Advance to knockout phase
2	(Spain) Atlético Madrid	6	3	1	2	8	5	+3	10	Advance to knockout phase
3	(Germany) Bayer Leverkusen	6	2	0	4	5	9	−4	6	Transfer to Europa League
4	(Russia) Lokomotiv Moscow	6	1	0	5	4	11	−7	3	

Source: UEFA
Rules for classification: Group stage tiebreakers

18 September 2019 1	Bayer Leverkusen (Germany)	1–2	Lokomotiv Moscow	Leverkusen, Germany
22:00 MSK (UTC+3)	Höwedes 25' (o.g.)	Summary	Krychowiak 16'; Barinov 37'	Stadium: BayArena; Attendance: 26,592; Referee: Paweł Raczkowski (Poland)

1 October 2019 2	Lokomotiv Moscow	0–2	(Spain) Atlético Madrid	Moscow
22:00 MSK (UTC+3)		Summary	Félix 48'; Thomas 58'	Stadium: RZD Arena; Attendance: 27,051; Referee: Orel Grinfeld (Israel)

22 October 2019 3	Juventus (Italy)	2–1	Lokomotiv Moscow	Turin, Italy
22:00 MSK (UTC+3)	Dybala 77', 79'	Summary	Al. Miranchuk 30'	Stadium: Juventus Stadium; Attendance: 38,547; Referee: Anastasios Sidiropoulos (Greece)

6 November 2019 4	Lokomotiv Moscow	1–2	(Italy) Juventus	Moscow
20:55 MSK (UTC+3)	Al. Miranchuk 12'; Rybus (yellow card) 83'	Summary	Ramsey 4'; Bonucci (yellow card) 39'; Costa 90+3', (yellow card) 90+3'	Stadium: RZD Arena; Attendance: 26,861; Referee: Ruddy Buquet (France)

26 November 2019 5	Lokomotiv Moscow	0–2	(Germany) Bayer Leverkusen	Moscow
20:55 MSK (UTC+3)		Summary	Zhemaletdinov 11' (o.g.); S. Bender 54'	Stadium: RZD Arena; Attendance: 25,757; Referee: Michael Oliver (England)

11 December 2019 6	Atlético Madrid (Spain)	2–0	Lokomotiv Moscow	Madrid, Spain
22:00 MSK (UTC+3)	Félix 17' (pen.); Felipe 54'	Summary		Stadium: Wanda Metropolitano; Attendance: 58,426; Referee: Viktor Kassai (Hungary)

== FC Kazanka Moscow ==
FC Kazanka Moscow
2019-20 season
- Chairman: Vasili Kiknadze
- Manager: Aleksandr Katasonov
- Stadium: Sapsan Arena
- Russian Professional Football League – West: TBC
Home colours	Away colours

The 2019-20 FC Kazanka Moscow season will be the club's 3rd season in the Russian Professional Football League following the club's relaunch in 2017.

=== Squad information ===
Players and squad numbers last updated on 10 August 2019.
Note: Flags indicate national team as has been defined under FIFA eligibility rules. Players may hold more than one non-FIFA nationality.

No	Nationality	Name	No	Nationality	Name	No	Nationality	Name
Goalkeepers
35	(Russia)	Ilya Sukhoruchenko	51	(Russia)	Vitali Botnar	60	(Russia)	Andrey Savin
Defenders
36	(Russia)	Innokenti Samokhvalov	37	(Russia)	Stanislav Magkeyev	42	(Russia)	Ivan Lapshov
43	(Russia)	Artyom Gyurdzhan	48	(Russia)	Dmitri Sukharev	53	(Russia)	Ilya Panin
56	(Russia)	Nikita Shishchenko	71	(Russia)	Nikolai Poyarkov	72	(Russia)	Nikita Zhyoltikov
74	(Russia)	Artur Chyorny	82	(Russia)	Ilya Petukhov			
Midfielders
32	(Russia)	Georgi Makhatadze	38	(Russia)	Nikolai Titkov	54	(Russia)	Viktor Demyanov
69	(Russia)	Daniil Kulikov	73	(Russia)	Maksim Petrov	76	(Russia)	Maksim Mukhin
83	(Russia)	Aleksei Mironov	89	(Russia)	Nikita Dorofeyev	98	(Russia)	Ivan Galanin
Forwards
50	(Russia)	Denis Faizullin	61	(Russia)	Vadim Karev	90	(Russia)	Mikhail Ageyev
91	(Russia)	Dzambolat Tsallagov	93	(Russia)	Timur Suleymanov	94	(Russia)	Dmitri Rybchinsky

=== Russian professional football league – west ===
==== Results ====
Home			Kazanka	Away		
Rnd	Date	Score	Opponent (City)	Score	Date	Rnd
1	17 July 2019	2 – 1	Kolomna (Kolomna)			
			Rodina (Moscow)	3 – 2	24 July 2019	2
3	1 August 2019	0 – 0	Olimp (Khimki)			

== WFC Lokomotiv Moscow ==
WFC Lokomotiv Moscow
2019 season
- Chairman: Vasili Kiknadze
- Manager: Elena Fomina
- Stadium: Sapsan Arena
- Russian Football Championship: TBC
Home colours	Away colours

The 2019 WFC Lokomotiv Moscow season will be the club's 2nd season in the Russian Women's Football Championship following the club's relaunch last year. WFC Lokomotiv Moscow will also take part in the Russian Women's Cup.

=== Squad information ===
Players and squad numbers last updated on 7 June 2019.
Note: Flags indicate national team as has been defined under FIFA eligibility rules. Players may hold more than one non-FIFA nationality.

No	Nationality	Name	No	Nationality	Name	No	Nationality	Name
Goalkeepers
1	(Ukraine)	Albina Fomchenko	21	(Russia)	Yulia Grichenko	24	(Russia)	Viktoria Nosenko
Defenders
2	(Russia)	Natalya Morozova	3	(Russia)	Anna Kozhnikova	4	(Russia)	Anastasiya Karandashova
15	(Russia)	Anna Belomyttseva	23	(Russia)	Ekaterina Bratko	30	(Russia)	Elvira Ziyastinova
Midfielders
9	(Russia)	Alena Ruzina	10	(Russia)	Veronika Kuropatkina	11	(Russia)	Elina Samoylova
16	(Russia)	Yana Sheina	17	(Russia)	Yana Khotyreva	29	(Russia)	Viktoriya Dergousova
Forwards
7	(Russia)	Lina Yakupova	13	(Russia)	Kristina Cherkasova	20	(Russia)	Nelli Korovkina
22	(Russia)	Lyubov Yashchenko						

=== Russian Women's Football Championship ===
==== Results ====
Home			WFC Lokomotiv	Away		
Rnd	Date	Score	Opponent (City)	Score	Date	Rnd
13	3 August 2019	0 – 1	Zvezda-2005 (Perm)	1 – 0	14 April 2019	1
2	21 April 2019	2 – 0	Chertanovo (Moscow)	5 – 0	1 June 2019	9
3	26 April 2019	0 – 0	Ryazan-VDV (Ryazan)	3 – 0	26 May 2019	8
14	16 August 2019		CSKA (Moscow)	0 – 1	2 May 2019	4
5	8 May 2019	3 – 0	Kubanochka (Krasnodar)	0 – 1	27 June 2019	12
6	14 May 2019	5 – 0	Torpedo (Izhevsk)		25 June 2019	11
10	7 June 2019	4 – 0	Yenisey (Krasnoyarsk)	3 – 0	20 May 2019	7

=== Russian Women's Cup ===
Description	Quarter-Finals		Semi-finals	
Home/Away	Away	Home	Away	Home
Date	1 June 2019	20 June 2019		
Opponent (City)	Chertanovo (Moscow)			
Score	5 – 0	1 – 0		
