= Miranchuk =

Miranchuk (Russian: Миранчук) is a surname of Slavic-language origin. Notable people with this surname include:

- Aleksei Miranchuk (born 1995), Russian footballer
- Anton Miranchuk (born 1995), Russian footballer
