= 2019 Russian Super Cup =

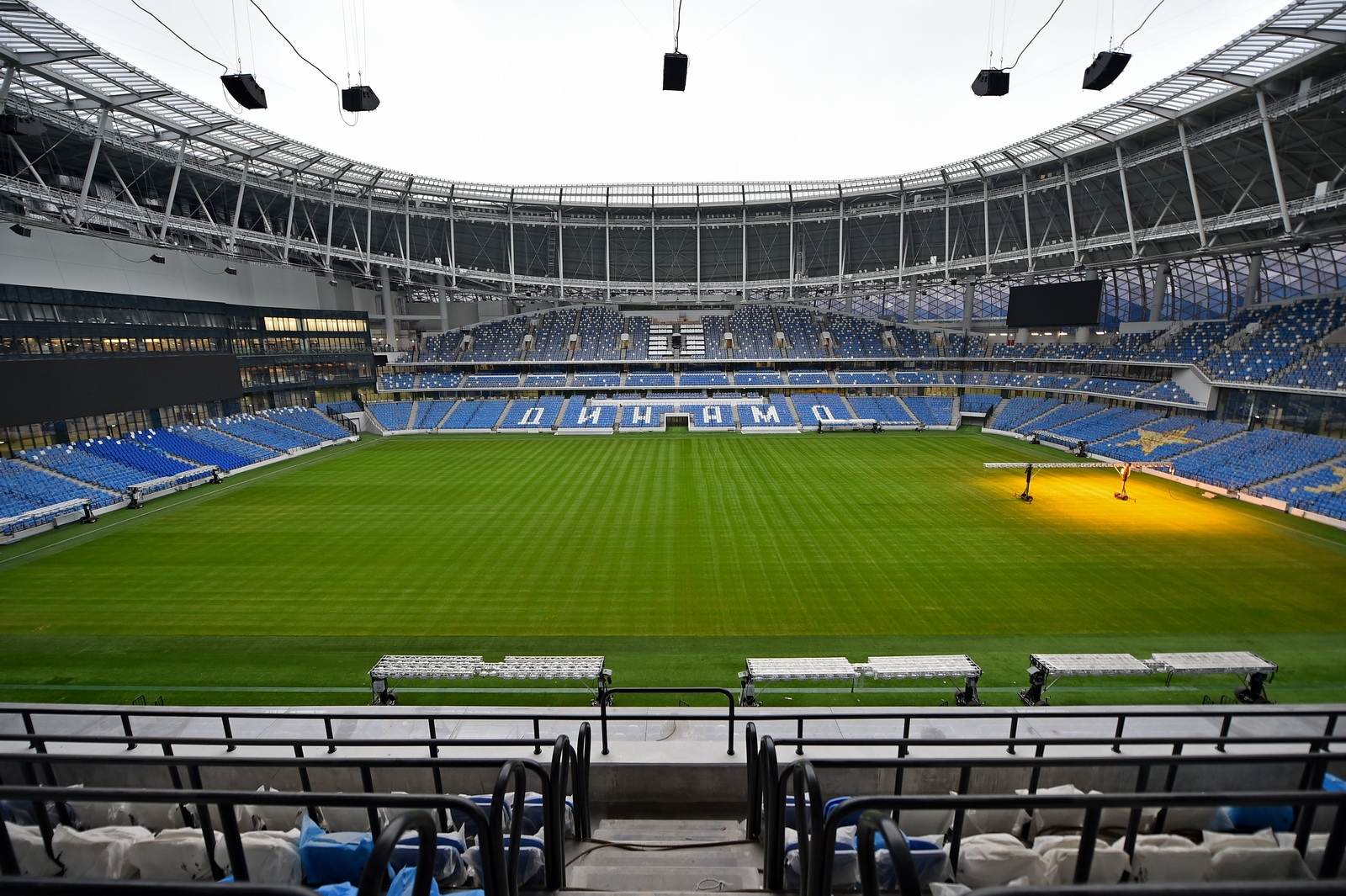
- Event: Russian Super Cup
Zenit Saint Petersburg	Lokomotiv Moscow
2	3
- Date: 6 July 2019
- Venue: VTB Arena, Moscow
- Man of the Match: Aleksei Miranchuk
- Referee: Sergey Lapochkin
- Attendance: 21,382

The 2019 Russian Super Cup (Russian: Суперкубок России) was the 17th annual Russian Super Cup match which was contested between the 2018–19 Russian Premier League champion, Zenit Saint Petersburg, and the 2018–19 Russian Cup winner, Lokomotiv Moscow. The final was played at VTB Arena.

== Match details ==
6 July 2019
19:00 MSK (UTC+3)

Zenit Saint Petersburg	2–3	Lokomotiv Moscow
Azmoun 45+2', 52'	Report	Smolov 6'; Al. Miranchuk 79', 81'

VTB Arena, Moscow
Attendance: 21,382
Referee: Sergey Lapochkin

GK	99	(Russia) Andrey Lunyov
DF	6	(Serbia) Branislav Ivanović (c)
DF	19	(Russia) Igor Smolnikov	(yellow card) 51'
DF	44	(Ukraine) Yaroslav Rakitskiy
MF	10	(Argentina) Emiliano Rigoni		(substituted off) 86'
MF	16	(Ecuador) Christian Noboa		(substituted off) 46'
MF	18	(Russia) Yuri Zhirkov
MF	27	(Russia) Magomed Ozdoyev	(yellow card) 68' (yellow-red card) 90+2'
FW	7	(Iran) Sardar Azmoun		(substituted off) 77'
FW	11	(Argentina) Sebastián Driussi
FW	22	(Russia) Artem Dzyuba
Substitutes:
GK	41	(Russia) Mikhail Kerzhakov
GK	70	(Russia) Nikita Goylo
MF	20	(Slovakia) Róbert Mak		(substituted in) 86'
MF	21	(Russia) Aleksandr Yerokhin		(substituted in) 46'
DF	23	(Slovenia) Miha Mevlja
DF	24	(Argentina) Emanuel Mammana
MF	36	(Russia) Andrei Mostovoy
MF	38	(Russia) Leon Musayev
DF	49	(Russia) Denis Terentyev
FW	77	(Montenegro) Luka Đorđević		(substituted in) 77'
DF	87	(Russia) Danila Prokhin
Manager:
(Russia) Sergei Semak

GK	1	(Russia) Guilherme
DF	2	(Russia) Dmitri Zhivoglyadov	(yellow card) 19'	(substituted off) 84'
DF	14	(Croatia) Vedran Ćorluka (c)
DF	27	(Brazil) Murilo
MF	6	(Russia) Dmitri Barinov
MF	7	(Poland) Grzegorz Krychowiak
MF	11	(Russia) Anton Miranchuk
MF	31	(Poland) Maciej Rybus
MF	59	(Russia) Aleksei Miranchuk
FW	9	(Russia) Fyodor Smolov		(substituted off) 90+5'
FW	17	(Russia) Rifat Zhemaletdinov		(substituted off) 67'
Substitutes:
GK	30	(Russia) Nikita Medvedev
GK	77	(Russia) Anton Kochenkov
DF	3	(Nigeria) Brian Idowu		(substituted in) 84'
MF	18	(Russia) Aleksandr Kolomeytsev		(substituted in) 90+5'
FW	19	(Portugal) Eder		(substituted in) 67'
DF	37	(Russia) Stanislav Magkeyev
DF	42	(Russia) Ivan Lapshov
FW	67	(Russia) Roman Tugarev
MF	69	(Russia) Daniil Kulikov
DF	84	(Russia) Mikhail Lysov
MF	89	(Russia) Nikita Dorofeyev
MF	94	(Russia) Dmitri Rybchinsky
Manager:
(Russia) Yuri Semin

Assistant referees: Aleksey Stipidi, Adlan Khatuev

Fourth official: Mikhail Vilkov
