= 2016–17 FC Lokomotiv Moscow season =

FC Lokomotiv Moscow
2016–17 season
- Chairman: Olga Smorodskaya (until 10 August 2016); Ilya Herkus (since 10 August 2016)
- Manager: Igor Cherevchenko (until 11 August 2016); Oleg Pashinin; Caretaker Manager (from 11 August 2016 until 26 August 2016); Yury Semin (since 26 August 2016)
- Stadium: Lokomotiv Stadium
- Russian Premier League: 8th
- Russian Cup: Winners
- Top goalscorer: League: Manuel Fernandes (7); All: Manuel Fernandes (9)
- Highest home attendance: 27,402 vs Spartak (RFPL, 18 March 2017)
- Lowest home attendance: 6,114 vs Ural (RFPL, 26 November 2016)
- Average home league attendance: 10,533
Home colours	Away colours	Third colours

The 2016–17 FC Lokomotiv Moscow season was the club's 25th season in the Russian Premier League, the highest tier of association football in Russia. Overall, Lokomotiv's performance in Premier League was disappointing as Lokomotiv ended in the 8th place. Lokomotiv Moscow participated in and won the Russian Cup, thereby also qualifying to the 2017-2018 UEFA Europa League.

== First Team Squad ==
=== Information ===
Players and squad numbers last updated on 3 February 2017.
Note: Flags indicate national team as has been defined under FIFA eligibility rules. Players may hold more than one non-FIFA nationality.

No.	Name	Nationality	Position	Date of Birth (Age)	Signed from	Since
Goalkeepers
1	Guilherme	(Russia)	GK	12 December 1985 (age 40)	(Brazil) Atlético Paranaense	2007
41	Miroslav Lobantsev	(Russia)	GK	27 May 1995 (age 30)	Youth system	2011
77	Anton Kochenkov	(Russia)	GK	2 April 1987 (age 38)	Mordovia Saransk	2015
Defenders
3	Timofei Margasov	(Russia)	DF	12 June 1992 (age 33)	Krylia Sovetov Samara	2017
5	Nemanja Pejčinović	(Serbia)	DF	4 November 1987 (age 38)	(France) Nice	2014
14	Vedran Ćorluka (captain)	(Croatia)	DF	5 February 1986 (age 40)	(England) Tottenham Hotspur	2012
17	Taras Mykhalyk	(Ukraine)	DF	28 October 1983 (age 42)	(Ukraine) Dynamo Kyiv	2013
28	Boris Rotenberg	(Finland)	DF	19 May 1986 (age 39)	Dynamo Moscow	2016
29	Vitaliy Denisov	(Uzbekistan)	DF	23 February 1987 (age 39)	(Ukraine) Dnipro Dnipropetrovsk	2013
33	Solomon Kvirkvelia	(Georgia (country))	DF	6 February 1992 (age 34)	(Ukraine) Rubin Kazan	2017
55	Renat Yanbayev	(Russia)	DF	7 April 1984 (age 41)	Kuban Krasnodar	2007
Midfielders
4	Manuel Fernandes	(Portugal)	MF	5 February 1986 (age 40)	(Turkey) Beşiktaş	2014
8	Jefferson Farfán	(Peru)	MF	26 October 1984 (age 41)	(United Arab Emirates) Al Jazira	2017
10	Dmitri Loskov	(Russia)	MF	12 February 1974 (age 52)	Out of retirement	2017
11	Alan Kasaev	(Russia)	MF	8 April 1986 (age 39)	Dynamo Moscow	2014
18	Aleksandr Kolomeytsev	(Russia)	MF	21 February 1989 (age 37)	Amkar Perm	2015
20	Vladislav Ignatyev	(Russia)	MF	20 January 1987 (age 39)	Kuban Krasnodar	2016
21	Amir Natkho	(Russia)	MF	9 July 1996 (age 29)	Krasnodar	2017
23	Dmitri Tarasov	(Russia)	MF	18 March 1987 (age 39)	FC Moscow	2010
27	Igor Denisov	(Russia)	MF	17 May 1984 (age 41)	Dynamo Moscow	2016
36	Dmitri Barinov	(Russia)	MF	11 January 1996 (age 30)	Youth system	2013
59	Aleksei Miranchuk	(Russia)	MF	17 October 1995 (age 30)	Youth system	2012
60	Anton Miranchuk	(Russia)	MF	17 October 1995 (age 30)	Youth system	2012
88	Delvin N'Dinga	(Republic of the Congo)	MF	14 March 1988 (age 38)	(France) Monaco	2015
Forwards
7	Maicon	(Brazil)	FW	18 February 1990 (age 36)	(Brazil) Fluminense	2010
9	Igor Portnyagin	(Russia)	FW	7 January 1989 (age 37)	Rubin Kazan	2016
32	Petar Škuletić	(Serbia)	FW	29 June 1990 (age 35)	(Serbia) Partizan Belgrade	2015
90	Ari	(Brazil)	FW	11 December 1985 (age 40)	Krasnodar	2017
Players who left midway through the season
15	Arseny Logashov	(Russia)	DF	20 August 1991 (age 34)	Anzhi Makhachkala	2013
19	Aleksandr Samedov	(Russia)	MF	19 July 1984 (age 41)	Dynamo Moscow	2012
45	Ezekiel Henty	(Nigeria)	FW	13 May 1993 (age 32)	(Slovenia) Olimpija Ljubljana	2016
49	Roman Shishkin	(Russia)	DF	27 January 1987 (age 39)	Spartak Moscow	2010
81	Ilya Abayev	(Russia)	GK	2 August 1981 (age 44)	Volga Nizhny Novgorod	2013

== Transfers ==
Note: Flags indicate national team as has been defined under FIFA eligibility rules. Players may hold more than one non-FIFA nationality.

=== Arrivals ===
Permanent transfer
Name	Nationality	Position	From	Fee	Date	Source
Miroslav Lobantsev	(Russia)	GK	Krylya Sovetov Samara	Returned from loan	16 June 2016	
Igor Portnyagin	(Russia)	FW	Rubin Kazan	Undisclosed (~ €3,000,000)	31 August 2016	
Boris Rotenberg	(Russia)	DF	Dynamo Moscow	Free Transfer	31 August 2016	
Sergey Makarov	(Russia)	MF	(Belarus) Minsk	Returned from loan	9 January 2017	
Anton Kochenkov	(Russia)	GK	Tom Tomsk	Returned from loan	9 January 2017	
Jefferson Farfán	(Peru)	MF	(United Arab Emirates) Al Jazira	Free Transfer	28 January 2017	
Timofei Margasov	(Russia)	DF	Krylya Sovetov Samara	Undisclosed (~ €250,000)	4 February 2017	
Amir Natkho	(Russia)	MF	Krasnodar	Free transfer	11 February 2017	
Dmitri Loskov	(Russia)	MF	Out of retirement		24 February 2017	
Permanent transfer, originally on loan
Name	Nationality	Position	From	Fee	Date	Source
Delvin N'Dinga	(Republic of the Congo)	MF	(France) Monaco	Undisclosed	1 July 2016	
In on loan
Name	Nationality	Position	From	Date	Until	Source
Igor Denisov	(Russia)	MF	Dynamo Moscow	31 August 2016	End of season	
Solomon Kvirkvelia	(Georgia (country))	DF	Rubin Kazan	23 February 2017	End of season	
Ari	(Brazil)	FW	Krasnodar	24 February 2017	End of season	

=== Departures ===
Permanent Transfer
Name	Nationality	Position	To	Fee	Date	Source
Maksim Grigoryev	(Russia)	MF	Unattached	Free transfer	30 June 2016	
Aleksandr Sheshukov	(Russia)	MF	Arsenal Tula	Free transfer	30 June 2016	
Ján Ďurica	(Slovakia)	DF	(Turkey) Trabzonspor	Free transfer	30 June 2016	
Rifat Zhemaletdinov	(Russia)	FW	Rubin Kazan	Undisclosed (~ €150,000)	4 July 2016	
Ilya Lantratov	(Russia)	GK	Shinnik Yaroslavl	Undisclosed	16 July 2016	
Georgi Makhatadze	(Russia)	MF	Rubin Kazan	Undisclosed	25 July 2016	
Mbark Boussoufa	(Morocco)	MF	(United Arab Emirates) Al Jazira	Free Transfer	30 July 2016	
Aleksandr Samedov	(Russia)	MF	Spartak Moscow	Undisclosed (~ €3,500,000)	16 January 2017	
Arseny Logashov	(Russia)	DF	Tosno	Free transfer	4 February 2017	
Out on loan
Name	Nationality	Position	Loan to	Date	Until	Source
Anton Miranchuk	(Russia)	MF	(Estonia) Levadia Tallinn	2 February 2016	End of season	
Sergey Makarov	(Russia)	MF	(Belarus) Minsk	17 February 2016	End of season	
Anton Kochenkov	(Russia)	GK	Tom Tomsk	4 July 2016	End of season	
Ezekiel Henty	(Nigeria)	FW	(United Arab Emirates) Baniyas	18 January 2017	30 June 2017	
Roman Shishkin	(Russia)	DF	Krasnodar	28 January 2017	31 May 2017	
Ilya Abayev	(Russia)	GK	Krasnodar	18 April 2017	End of season	

== Friendlies ==
=== Pre-season ===
26 June 2016	(Tajikistan) Istiklol	1 – 2	Lokomotiv Moscow	Dushanbe
19:00 MSK (UTC+3)	Mawutor 51'	Summary	Miranchuk 31'; Škuletić 90'	Stadium: Pamir Stadium; Attendance: 11,000; Referee: Bahrom Sadulloev

3 July 2016	Lokomotiv Moscow	7 – 1	Dolgoprudny	Moscow
18:00 MSK (UTC+3)	Henty 31' 37'; N'Dinga 49'; Tarasov 55'; Pejčinović 57'; Barinov 77'; Lysov 90'	Summary	Vasilyev 76'	Stadium: Training Field

7 July 2016	Lokomotiv Moscow	2 – 0	Ufa	Moscow
18:00 MSK (UTC+3)	Henty 60'; Kolomeytsev 73'	Summary		Stadium: Training Field

13 July 2016	Lokomotiv Moscow	1 – 1	(France) Lorient	Schwaz, Austria
19:10 MSK (UTC+3)	Škuletić 62'	Summary	Fofana 87'	Stadium: Silberstadt Arena Schwaz

19 July 2016	Lokomotiv Moscow	0 – 0	(Czech Republic) Viktoria Plzeň	Wörgl, Austria
19:00 MSK (UTC+3)		Summary		Stadium: Sportzentrum Wörgl

=== Mid-season ===
5 September 2017	Lokomotiv Moscow	0 – 1	Arsenal Tula	Moscow
16:30 MSK (UTC+3)		Summary	Gorbanets 48'	Stadium: Lokomotiv Stadium (Training Field)

9 October 2016	Lokomotiv Moscow	1 – 3	Ufa	Moscow
15:00 MSK (UTC+3)	Henty 90'	Summary	Mykhalyk 64' (o.g.); Krotov 75' 86'	Stadium: Lokomotiv Stadium (Training Field)

16 January 2017	Lokomotiv Moscow	2 – 0	(Germany) Werder Bremen II	Marbella, Spain
18:00 MSK (UTC+3)	Kore 14' 33'	Summary		Stadium: Estadio Municipal de Marbella

19 January 2017	Lokomotiv Moscow	1 – 2	(Switzerland) Basel	Marbella, Spain
18:00 MSK (UTC+3)	Galadzhan 60'	Summary	Janko 32'; Šporar 85'	Stadium: Marbella Football Center; Attendance: 70; Referee: (Spain) José Maria Sánchez

22 January 2017	Lokomotiv Moscow	1 – 2	(Bulgaria) CSKA Sofia	Cádiz, Spain
18:00 MSK (UTC+3)	N'Dinga 50'	Summary	Pedro 51'; Šporar 84'	Stadium: Ayala Polo Club

29 January 2017	Lokomotiv Moscow	2 – 1	(Croatia) Osijek	Marbella, Spain
18:00 MSK (UTC+3)	Ignatyev 32'; Galadzhan 80'	Summary	Ejupi 78'	Stadium: Marbella Football Center

3 February 2017	Lokomotiv Moscow	2 – 0	(Hungary) Videoton	Marbella, Spain
18:00 MSK (UTC+3)	Maicon 13'; Miranchuk 58' (pen.)	Summary		Stadium: Estadio Municipal de Marbella

5 February 2017	Lokomotiv Moscow	0 – 2	(Japan) Shonan Bellmare	Marbella, Spain
17:30 MSK (UTC+3)		Summary	Kikuchi 81'; Fujita 85'	Stadium: Estadio Municipal de Marbella

6 February 2017	Lokomotiv Moscow	1 – 0	(Denmark) SønderjyskE	Marbella, Spain
18:00 MSK (UTC+3)	Denisov 59'	Summary		Stadium: Estadio Jose Burgos Quintana

18 February 2017	Lokomotiv Moscow	1 – 1	(China) Beijing Guoan	Marbella, Spain
17:00 MSK (UTC+3)	Galadzhan 80'	Summary	Dabao 64'	Stadium: Marbella Football Center

3 February 2017	Lokomotiv Moscow	1 – 0	Hebei China Fortune	Marbella, Spain
19:00 MSK (UTC+3)	Miranchuk 24'	Summary		Stadium: Marbella Football Center

22 February 2017	Lokomotiv Moscow	0 – 1	(Norway) Strømsgodset	Marbella, Spain
18:00 MSK (UTC+3)		Summary	Tokstad 44'	Stadium: Marbella Football Center

== Competitions ==
=== Overview ===
Competition	Started Round	Final Round	First Match	Last Match	G	W	D	L	GF	GA	GD	Win %
Premier League	-	8th Place	30 July 2016	21 May 2017	30	10	12	8	39	27	12	33.33%
Russian Cup	Round of 32	Winners	21 September 2016	2 May 2017	5	5	0	0	10	1	9	100.00%

=== Russian Premier League ===
==== League table ====
Pos	Team	Pld	W	D	L	GF	GA	GD	Pts	Qualification or relegation
6	Rostov	30	13	9	8	36	18	+18	48	
7	Ufa	30	12	7	11	22	25	−3	43	
8	Lokomotiv Moscow	30	10	12	8	39	27	+12	42	Qualification for the Europa League group stage (Note: Lokomotiv Moscow qualified for the Europa League group stage by winning the 2016–17 Russian Cup.)
9	Rubin Kazan	30	10	8	12	30	34	−4	38	
10	Amkar Perm	30	8	11	11	25	29	−4	35	

Source: Russian Premier League, Soccerway
Rules for classification: 1) Points; 2) Matches won; 3) Head-to-head points; 4) Head-to-head matches won; 5) Head-to-head goal difference; 6) Head-to-head goals scored; 7) Head-to-head away goals; 8) Goal difference; 9) Goals scored; 10) Away goals scored.

==== Results by round ====
Round	1	2	3	4	5	6	7	8	9	10	11	12	13	14	15	16	17	18	19	20	21	22	23	24	25	26	27	28	29	30
Ground	A	H	A	H	A	A	H	A	H	A	H	A	H	A	H	A	H	A	H	H	A	H	A	H	A	H	A	H	A	H
Result	D	D	D	D	W	L	L	L	D	D	W	L	W	D	D	W	W	W	L	D	W	D	W	D	L	L	D	W	W	L
Position	7	9	12	12	9	9	11	13	13	12	11	11	11	11	11	11	10	10	10	10	9	9	5	6	7	8	8	8	7	8

Source: Russian Premier League
A = Away; H = Home; W = Win; D = Draw; L = Loss

==== Matches ====
30 July 2016 1	Zenit Saint Petersburg	0 – 0	Lokomotiv Moscow	Saint Petersburg
17:30 MSK (UTC+3)		Summary		Stadium: Petrovsky Stadium; Attendance: 18,427; Referee: Aleksandr Egorov

7 August 2016 2	Lokomotiv Moscow	2 – 2	Tom Tomsk	Moscow
19:00 MSK (UTC+3)	Škuletić 13' (pen.); Samedov 33' (pen.)	Summary	Bicfalvi 76'; Pugin 85'	Stadium: Lokomotiv Stadium; Attendance: 8,103; Referee: Sergei Ivanov

14 August 2016 3	Terek Grozny	1 – 1	Lokomotiv Moscow	Grozny
20:30 MSK (UTC+3)	Ivanov 5'	Summary	Škuletić 35'	Stadium: Akhmat-Arena; Attendance: 14,720; Referee: Vladislav Bezborodov

21 August 2016 4	Lokomotiv Moscow	0 – 0	Krylya Sovetov Samara	Moscow
20:30 MSK (UTC+3)		Summary		Stadium: Lokomotiv Stadium; Attendance: 9,107; Referee: Kirill Levnikov

28 August 2016 5	Krasnodar	1 – 2	Lokomotiv Moscow	Krasnodar
19:15 MSK (UTC+3)	Smolov 48' (pen.)	Summary	Samedov 41'; Henty 56' (pen.)	Stadium: Kuban Stadium; Attendance: 12,780; Referee: Sergey Lapochkin

11 September 2016 6	Spartak Moscow	1 – 0	Lokomotiv Moscow	Moscow
16:30 MSK (UTC+3)	Popov 25'	Summary		Stadium: Otkrytie Arena; Attendance: 43,710; Referee: Aleksey Nikolaev

17 September 2016 7	Lokomotiv Moscow	0 – 1	Ufa	Moscow
19:00 MSK (UTC+3)		Summary	Ćorluka 69' (o.g.)	Stadium: Lokomotiv Stadium; Attendance: 9,714; Referee: Vitaliy Meshkov

24 September 2016 8	Rostov	1 – 0	Lokomotiv Moscow	Rostov-on-Don
21:30 MSK (UTC+3)	Poloz 41'	Summary		Stadium: Olimp-2; Attendance: 12,777; Referee: Kirill Levnikov

1 October 2016 9	Lokomotiv Moscow	1 – 1	Arsenal Tula	Moscow
17:00 MSK (UTC+3)	Samedov 90+'	Summary	Brown Forbes 44'	Stadium: Lokomotiv Stadium; Attendance: 8,743; Referee: Vladimir Seldyakov

15 October 2016 10	Amkar Perm	0 – 0	Lokomotiv Moscow	Perm
14:30 MSK (UTC+3)		Summary		Stadium: Zvezda Stadium; Attendance: 7,760; Referee: Vladimir Moskalyov

23 October 2016 11	Lokomotiv Moscow	1 – 0	CSKA Moscow	Moscow
16:30 MSK (UTC+3)	Maicon 65'	Summary		Stadium: Lokomotiv Stadium; Attendance: 17,130; Referee: Sergei Karasev

31 October 2016 12	Rubin Kazan	2 – 0	Lokomotiv Moscow	Kazan
19:30 MSK (UTC+3)	Kanunnikov 69'; Jonathas 77'	Summary		Stadium: Kazan Arena; Attendance: 8,026; Referee: Vladislav Bezborodov

5 November 2016 13	Lokomotiv Moscow	4 – 0	Anzhi Makhachkala	Moscow
18:30 MSK (UTC+3)	Maicon 3' 5'; Fernandes 50'; Samedov 60'	Summary		Stadium: Lokomotiv Stadium; Attendance: 8,014; Referee: Mikhail Vilkov

19 November 2016 14	Orenburg	1 – 1	Lokomotiv Moscow	Orenburg
14:30 MSK (UTC+3)	Nyakhaychyk 59'	Summary	Kasaev 25'	Stadium: Gazovik Stadium; Attendance: 5,622; Referee: Kirill Levnikov

26 November 2016 15	Lokomotiv Moscow	1 – 1	Ural Yekaterinburg	Moscow
17:00 MSK (UTC+3)	Pejčinović 86'	Summary	Fidler 90+'	Stadium: Lokomotiv Stadium; Attendance: 6,114; Referee: Vladimir Seldyakov

1 December 2016 16	Tom Tomsk	1 – 6	Lokomotiv Moscow	Moscow
19:30 MSK (UTC+3)	Bicfalvi 48'	Summary	Kolomeytsev 51' 82'; Fernandes 67'; Denisov 71'; Maicon 76'; Ignatyev 79'	Stadium: Lokomotiv Stadium; Attendance: 5,218; Referee: Roman Galimov

4 December 2016 17	Lokomotiv Moscow	2 – 0	Terek Grozny	Moscow
16:00 MSK (UTC+3)	Miranchuk 23'; Fernandes 75'	Summary		Stadium: Lokomotiv Stadium; Attendance: 6,282; Referee: Sergey Lapochkin

5 March 2017 18	Krylya Sovetov Samara	0 – 3	Lokomotiv Moscow	Ufa
14:00 MSK (UTC+3)		Summary	Ari 60' 68'; Miranchuk 88'	Stadium: Neftyanik Stadium; Attendance: 1,055; Referee: Sergey Ivanov

13 March 2017 19	Lokomotiv Moscow	1 – 2	Krasnodar	Moscow
19:30 MSK (UTC+3)	Ignatyev 36'	Summary	Mamayev 57'; Wánderson 64'	Stadium: Lokomotiv Stadium; Attendance: 9,494; Referee: Vitaliy Meshkov

18 March 2017 20	Lokomotiv Moscow	1 – 1	Spartak Moscow	Moscow
16:30 MSK (UTC+3)	Ari 41'	Summary	Promes 52'	Stadium: Lokomotiv Stadium; Attendance: 27,402; Referee: Mikhail Vilkov

1 April 2017 21	Ufa	0 – 1	Lokomotiv Moscow	Ufa
15:00 MSK (UTC+3)		Summary	Farfán 37'	Stadium: Neftyanik Stadium; Attendance: 8,600; Referee: Roman Galimov

9 April 2017 22	Lokomotiv Moscow	0 – 0	Rostov	Moscow
19:00 MSK (UTC+3)		Summary		Stadium: Lokomotiv Stadium; Attendance: 9,619; Referee: Vladislav Bezborodov

16 April 2017 23	Arsenal Tula	0 – 3	Lokomotiv Moscow	Tula
17:30 MSK (UTC+3)		Summary	Fernandes 53'; Maicon 74'; Ari 78'	Stadium: Arsenal Stadium; Attendance: 12,430; Referee: Sergey Lapochkin

22 April 2017 24	Lokomotiv Moscow	3 – 3	Amkar Perm	Moscow
16:30 MSK (UTC+3)	Miranchuk 43'; Tarasov 54'; Fernandes 56'	Summary	Bodul 22' 61'; Prokofyev 88'	Stadium: Lokomotiv Stadium; Attendance: 7,035; Referee: Sergey Ivanov

26 April 2017 25	CSKA Moscow	4 – 0	Lokomotiv Moscow	Moscow
19:30 MSK (UTC+3)	Dzagoev 11'; Vitinho 39'; Golovin 45'; Natcho 52'	Summary		Stadium: VEB Arena; Attendance: 16,940; Referee: Sergei Karasev

16 April 2017 26	Lokomotiv Moscow	0 – 1	Rubin Kazan	Moscow
16:30 MSK (UTC+3)		Summary	Tkachuk 20'	Stadium: Lokomotiv Stadium; Attendance: 7,035; Referee: Kirill Levnikov

8 May 2017 27	Anzhi Makhachkala	0 – 0	Lokomotiv Moscow	Makhachkala
17:00 MSK (UTC+3)		Summary		Stadium: Anzhi Arena; Attendance: 4,980; Referee: Sergey Lapochkin

13 May 2017 28	Lokomotiv Moscow	4 – 0	Orenburg	Moscow
19:30 MSK (UTC+3)	Ari 37' 50'; Mykhalyk 71'; Fernandes 85'	Summary		Stadium: Lokomotiv Stadium; Attendance: 10,177; Referee: Kirill Levnikov

17 May 2017 29	Ural Yekaterinburg	4 – 0	Lokomotiv Moscow	Yekaterinburg
17:30 MSK (UTC+3)	Pejčinović 33'; Fernandes 85'	Summary	Kvirkvelia o.g.' (78)	Stadium: SKB-Bank Arena; Attendance: 5,570; Referee: Vladislav Bezborodov

21 May 2017 30	Lokomotiv Moscow	0 – 2	Zenit Saint Petersburg	Moscow
15:00 MSK (UTC+3)		Summary	Kokorin 34'; Danny 83'	Stadium: Lokomotiv Stadium; Attendance: 14,022; Referee: Kirill Levnikov

=== Russian Cup ===
21 September 2016 Round of 32	Khimki	0 – 3	Lokomotiv Moscow	Khimki
20:00 MSK (UTC+3)		Summary	Kasaev 44'; Chernyshov 53' (o.g.); Portnyagin 64'	Stadium: Rodina Stadium; Attendance: 2,000; Referee: Vasily Kazartsev

27 October 2016 Round of 16	Krylya Sovetov Samara	1 – 3	Lokomotiv Moscow	Samara
18:00 MSK (UTC+3)	Chochiyev 75'	Summary	Maicon 19'; Samedov 50'; Fernandes 63'	Stadium: Metallurg Stadium; Attendance: 4,841; Referee: Vladimir Seldyakov

1 March 2017 Quarter-finals	Lokomotiv Moscow	1 – 0	Tosno	Moscow
19:30 MSK (UTC+3)	Miranchuk 19'	Summary		Stadium: Lokomotiv Stadium; Attendance: 7,659; Referee: Artem Chistyakov

5 April 2017 Semi-finals	Lokomotiv Moscow	1 – 0	Ufa	Moscow
19:30 MSK (UTC+3)	Fernandes 44'	Summary		Stadium: Lokomotiv Stadium; Attendance: 9,851; Referee: Aleksandr Egorov

2 May 2017 Final	Ural Yekaterinburg	0 – 2	Lokomotiv Moscow	Sochi
18:45 MSK (UTC+3)		Summary	Denisov 76'; Miranchuk 90'	Stadium: Fisht Olympic Stadium; Attendance: 24,500; Referee: Aleksei Nikolaev

== Awards ==
=== Lokomotiv player of the month award ===
Awarded monthly to the player that was chosen by fan voting on Lokomotiv's official portal on VK.

Month	First				Second				Third			
Month	No.	Name	Votes	%	No.	Name	Votes	%	No.	Name	Votes	%
August	59	Aleksei Miranchuk	5,431	60.8%	19	Aleksandr Samedov	2,193	25.5%	29	Vitaliy Denisov	884	9.9%
September	11	Alan Kasaev	1,945	33.2%	36	Dmitri Barinov	1,225	20.9%	94	Dmitri Rybchinsky	1,106	18.8%
October	7	Maicon	3,994	49.0%	4	Manuel Fernandes	2,599	31.8%	19	Aleksandr Samedov	1,022	12.5%
November	4	Manuel Fernandes	8,318	79.7%	7	Maicon	1,298	12.4%	29	Igor Denisov	388	3.7%
December	4	Manuel Fernandes	8,318	79.7%	7	Maicon	1,298	12.4%	29	Igor Denisov	388	3.7%
March	90	Ari	8,534	71.1%	59	Aleksei Miranchuk	1,260	10.5%	29	Vladislav Ignatyev	866	7.2%
April	4	Manuel Fernandes	4,354	55.2%	59	Aleksei Miranchuk	1,182	15.0%	61	Islam Vagabov	1,026	13.0%
May	4	Manuel Fernandes	7,052	56.0%	59	Aleksei Miranchuk	2,305	18.0%	33	Solomon Kvirkvelia	1,244	9.9%
