= Eder (footballer, born 1987) =

Portuguese footballer

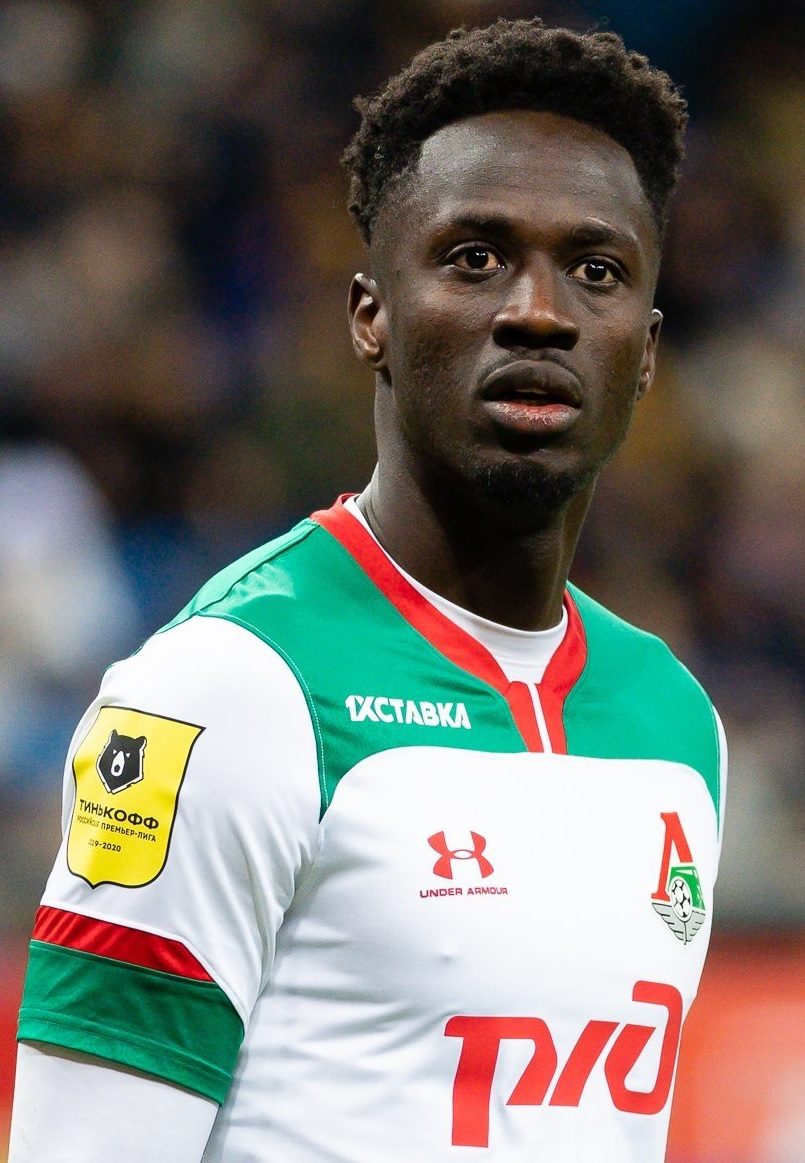
- Eder with Lokomotiv Moscow in 2020

Personal information
- Full name: Ederzito António Macedo Lopes
- Date of birth: 22 December 1987 (age 38)
- Place of birth: Bissau, Guinea-Bissau
- Height: 1.90 m (6 ft 3 in)
- Position: Forward

Youth career
- 1999–2006: ADC Adémia

Senior career*
Years	Team	Apps	(Gls)
2006	Oliveira Hospital		
2006–2008	Tourizense	42	(11)
2008–2012	Académica	83	(12)
2012–2015	Braga	60	(26)
2015–2016	Swansea City	13	(0)
2016	→ Lille (loan)	13	(6)
2016–2018	Lille	31	(6)
2017–2018	→ Lokomotiv Moscow (loan)	18	(4)
2018–2021	Lokomotiv Moscow	65	(7)
2021–2022	Al Raed	22	(6)
Total		347	(78)

International career
2012–2018	Portugal	35	(5)
Medal record
Men's football
Representing Portugal
UEFA European Championship
Winner	2016 France
- * Club domestic league appearances and goals

Ederzito António Macedo Lopes ComM (born 22 December 1987), commonly known as Eder (Note: Sometimes spelt Éder, especially in Portuguese language media, in accordance with Portuguese spelling conventions. Eder himself has expressed distaste for this spelling and goes by the version without the diacritic.) (Portuguese pronunciation: [ˈɛðɛɾ]), is a former professional footballer who played as a forward.

He signed with Académica in 2008 from the lower leagues, and joined Braga four years later. Over seven seasons, he appeared in 143 Primeira Liga matches and scored 38 goals. He also played in Wales, France, Russia and Saudi Arabia, notably winning the 2017–18 Premier League with Lokomotiv Moscow.

Eder was born in Guinea-Bissau. A Portugal international since 2012, he represented the country at the 2014 World Cup and Euro 2016, winning the latter and also scoring the sole goal in the final.

== Club career ==
=== Early years ===
Born in Bissau, Guinea-Bissau, Eder moved to Portugal as a child, and started playing football with Associação Desportiva e Cultural da Adémia in the Coimbra District at the age of 11. He made his senior debut with Oliveira do Hospital and G.D. Tourizense, the latter in the third division and the farm team of Académica de Coimbra.

=== Académica ===
Eder made his Primeira Liga debut for Académica on 24 August 2008, in a 1–0 away loss against C.F. Estrela da Amadora. He scored his first goal for the club at the end of the season, netting the Students equalising goal in an eventual 3–1 victory over Associação Naval 1º de Maio.

On 2 May 2010, Eder scored what looked like a winning goal against C.D. Nacional, but the visitors equalised at 3–3 in the 90th minute. On 12 September of the following year, against the same opponent and also in Coimbra, he scored twice in a 4–0 rout. He finished the season with five goals in 16 appearances, and helped the club win its first Portuguese Cup since 1939 after defeating Sporting CP in the final, but he only featured in the earlier rounds of the cup as he was suspended for not reporting to training for several weeks, as interest from other clubs in signing him grew.

=== Braga ===
Eder signed with S.C. Braga in summer 2012, for four years. He made his official debut for his new team on 2 September in a 2–0 defeat at F.C. Paços de Ferreira but scored twice later that month as the Minho Province side defeated Rio Ave F.C. 4–1 at home, contributing one in a 4–4 home draw with S.C. Olhanense.

On 30 November 2012, in the fifth round of the Taça de Portugal, Eder netted the winning goal as Braga defeated FC Porto 2–1, booking a place in the quarter-finals. On 6 January 2013, in a league match against Moreirense FC, he scored the game's only goal shortly after the restart. On 23 February he scored in each half of the local derby against Vitória de Guimarães in a 3–2 win at the Estádio Municipal de Braga, but missed the rest of the campaign after suffering a ligament tear in early March.

In the domestic cup final on 31 May 2015, Eder opened the scoring against Sporting with a penalty after Cédric Soares had been sent off for fouling Djavan, but missed in the penalty shootout in an eventual loss following a 2–2 draw.

=== Swansea City and Lille ===
On 28 June 2015, Premier League club Swansea City agreed a fee of around £5 million to sign Eder on a three-year deal. He made his debut on 8 August, playing the final 11 minutes of a 2–2 draw at title holders Chelsea in place of Bafétimbi Gomis.

Having not scored in 15 competitive games for the Swans – only four starts – Eder joined Lille OSC on loan for the remainder of the season. He made his French Ligue 1 debut on 3 February 2016 as a half-time replacement for Yassine Benzia in a 1–0 home win over Stade Malherbe Caen. He scored his first goal four days later, to open a 1–1 draw against Stade Rennais F.C. also at the Stade Pierre-Mauroy.

Eder played the full 90 minutes in the final of the Coupe de la Ligue on 23 April 2016, which ended in a 2–1 loss against Paris Saint-Germain FC. On 24 May, after helping his team finish fifth and qualify for the UEFA Europa League, he signed a permanent four-year contract.

On 2 March 2017, Eder scored the final goal (four minutes into injury time after 90 minutes of normal time had elapsed) in a 2–1 away defeat of Championnat de France Amateur side Bergerac Périgord FC in the round of 16.

=== Lokomotiv Moscow ===
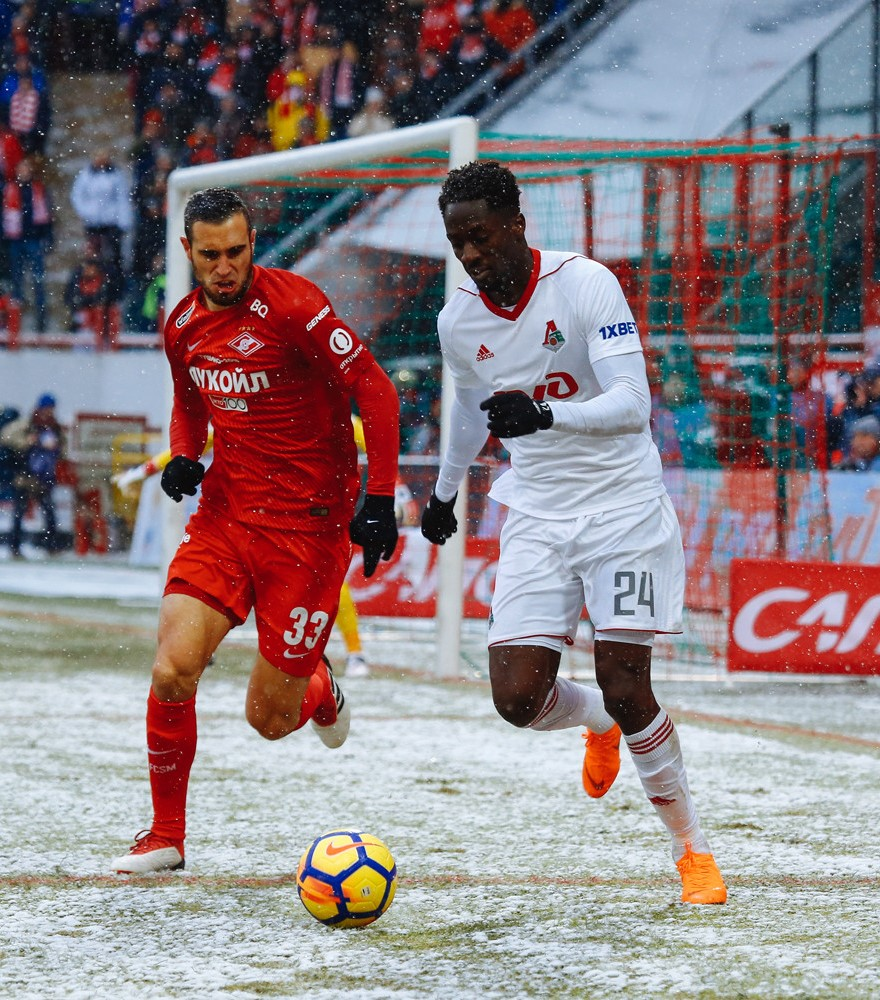
Eder and Spartak Moscow's Nikola Maksimović in March 2018

On 23 August 2017, Eder joined Russian Premier League club FC Lokomotiv Moscow in a season-long loan with a buyout option. On 5 May 2018, he scored the winning goal in the 87th minute from Vladislav Ignatyev's cross against FC Zenit Saint Petersburg in a 1–0 victory, which helped to grant his team their first league title since 2004.

Eder moved to the RZD Arena on 16 July 2018, on a permanent basis. He ended that season as a national cup winner, scoring a penalty to open a 4–1 home win over FC Yenisey Krasnoyarsk in the last 16 on 31 October. On 6 July, he was a substitute in the 3–2 defeat of FC Zenit Saint Petersburg in the 2019 Russian Super Cup.

Eder scored for the first time in the UEFA Champions League on 21 October 2020, in a 2–2 away draw against FC Red Bull Salzburg in the group stage. He won the cup again at the end of the season.

=== Al Raed ===
On 23 September 2021, free agent Eder signed a contract of undisclosed length with Al Raed FC in the Saudi Professional League. He left a year later and did not find a new club by November 2023, being given an executive job in the Portuguese Football Federation the following April.

== International career ==
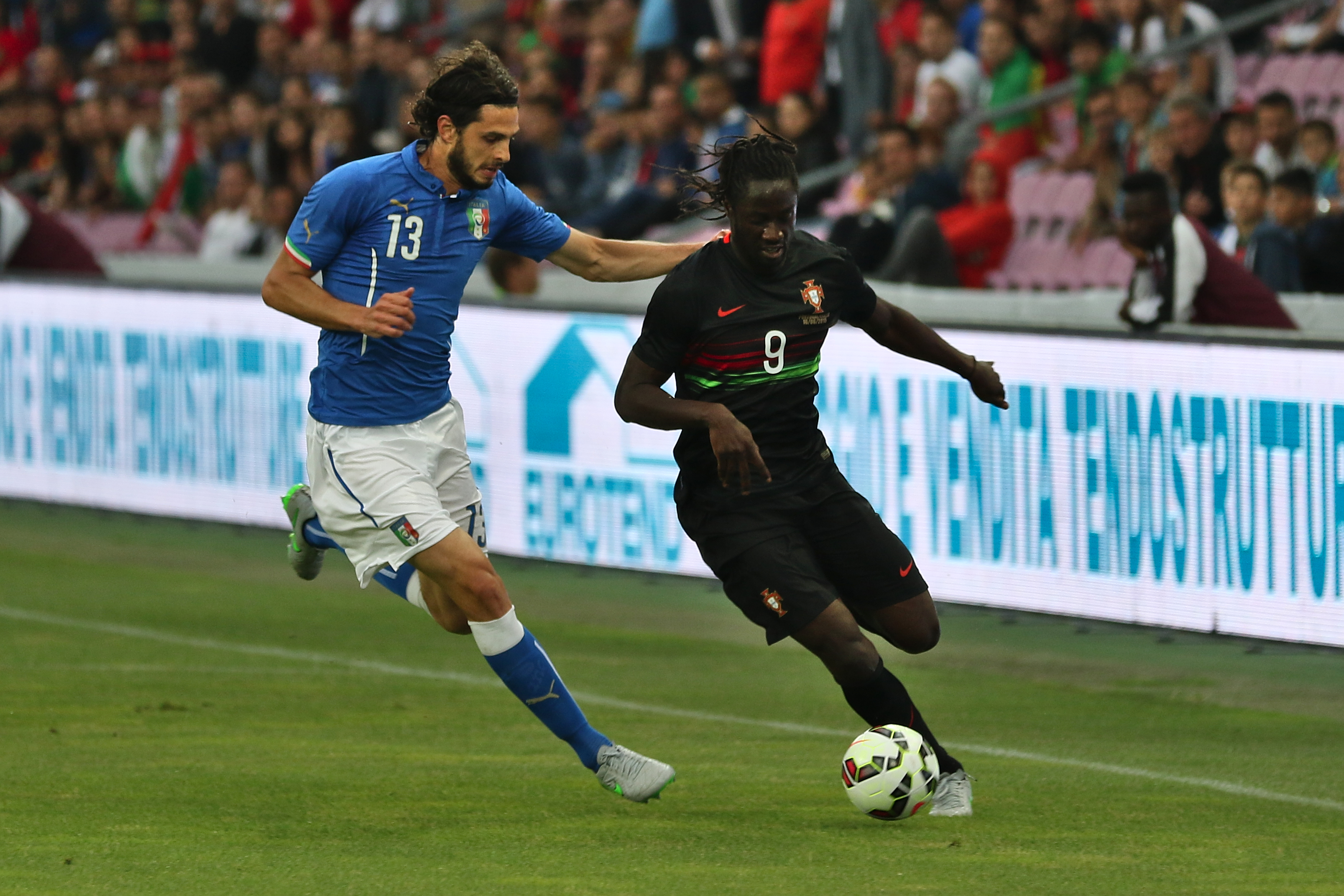
Eder taking on Italy's Andrea Ranocchia in a June 2015 friendly.

Eder chose to represent Portugal internationally. After impressive club performances for Braga, he was first called up by the national team in August 2012 for a match against Luxembourg for the 2014 FIFA World Cup qualifiers, but remained an unused substitute in the 2–1 away win on 7 September. He made his debut four days later in the same competition, replacing Hélder Postiga in the dying minutes of a 3–0 home victory over Azerbaijan.

On 19 May 2014, Eder was named in the final 23-man squad for the tournament in Brazil. He made his debut in the competition on 16 June, replacing the injured Hugo Almeida in the first half of a 4–0 group stage loss to Germany. In the second game, a 2–2 draw against the United States, he replaced another injured striker early on, this time Postiga.

Eder's first international goal came on his 18th cap, the only goal in a friendly defeat of Italy at the Stade de Genève on 16 June 2015. He was selected by Fernando Santos for his UEFA Euro 2016 squad, appearing in three matches as a substitute and scoring the only goal in the final to help defeat hosts France after extra time.

Eder was not picked for the 2017 FIFA Confederations Cup squad, being replaced by Porto's André Silva. He was included in a preliminary 35-man list for the 2018 World Cup, but did not make the final cut.

== Style of play ==
Eder was often described as a strong, hard-working and well-rounded striker, with a solid first touch. Usually deployed as a centre-forward, he excelled in the air due to his height and powerful physique, although he was also capable of playing in other offensive positions due to his ability to hold up the ball with his back to goal and play off his teammates.

== Personal life ==
In 2017, Eder married in Algarve to Sanna Ladera, a Belgian model. They later welcomed sons Kaï and Rio.

== Career statistics ==
=== Club ===
Appearances and goals by club, season and competition
Club	Season	League			Cup		Europe		Other		Total	
Club	Season	Division	Apps	Goals	Apps	Goals	Apps	Goals	Apps	Goals	Apps	Goals
Tourizense	2006–07	Segunda Divisão	7	1	1	0	—		—		8	1
Tourizense	2007–08	Segunda Divisão	34	10	1	0	—		—		35	10
Tourizense	2008–09	Segunda Divisão	1	0	1	0	—		—		2	0
Tourizense	Total		42	11	3	0	0	0	0	0	45	11
Académica	2008–09	Primeira Liga	24	1	6	0	—		—		30	1
Académica	2009–10	Primeira Liga	22	4	5	2	—		—		27	6
Académica	2010–11	Primeira Liga	21	2	6	3	—		—		27	5
Académica	2011–12	Primeira Liga	16	5	5	1	—		—		21	6
Académica	Total		83	12	22	6	0	0	0	0	105	18
Braga	2012–13	Primeira Liga	18	13	7	3	7 (Note: Appearances in UEFA Champions League)	0	—		32	16
Braga	2013–14	Primeira Liga	13	3	2	1	1 (Note: Appearances in UEFA Europa League)	0	—		16	4
Braga	2014–15	Primeira Liga	29	10	10	4	—		—		39	14
Braga	Total		60	26	19	8	8	0	0	0	87	34
Swansea City	2015–16	Premier League	13	0	2	0	—		—		15	0
Lille	2015–16	Ligue 1	13	6	1	0	—		—		14	6
Lille	2016–17	Ligue 1	31	6	5	1	1	0	—		37	7
Lille	Total		44	12	6	1	1	0	0	0	51	13
Lokomotiv Moscow (loan)	2017–18	Russian Premier League	18	4	1	0	9	0	—		28	4
Lokomotiv Moscow	2018–19	Russian Premier League	22	1	6	2	6	0	1 (Note: Appearance in Russian Super Cup)	0	35	3
Lokomotiv Moscow	2019–20	Russian Premier League	23	5	1	1	5	0	1	0	30	6
Lokomotiv Moscow	2020–21	Russian Premier League	20	1	2	0	3	1	1	0	26	2
Lokomotiv Moscow	Total		83	11	1	3	23	1	3	0	119	15
Al Raed	2021–22	Saudi Pro League	22	6	1	0	—		—		23	6
Career total			347	78	63	18	32	1	3	0	435	97

=== International ===
Appearances and goals by national team and year
National team	Year	Apps	Goals
Portugal	2012	4	0
Portugal	2013	2	0
Portugal	2014	10	0
Portugal	2015	5	1
Portugal	2016	11	3
Portugal	2017	1	0
Portugal	2018	2	1
Total		35	5

Scores and results list Portugal's goal tally first, score column indicates score after each Eder goal.

International goals by date, venue, cap, opponent, score, result and competition
No.	Date	Venue	Cap	Opponent	Score	Result	Competition
1	16 June 2015	Stade de Genève, Geneva, Switzerland	18	Italy	1–0	1–0	Friendly
2	29 May 2016	Estádio do Dragão, Porto, Portugal	24	Norway	3–0	3–0	Friendly
3	8 June 2016	Estádio da Luz, Lisbon, Portugal	26	Estonia	7–0	7–0	Friendly
4	10 July 2016	Stade de France, Saint-Denis, France	29	France	1–0	1–0 (a.e.t.)	UEFA Euro 2016
5	14 October 2018	Hampden Park, Glasgow, Scotland	34	Scotland	2–0	3–1	Friendly

== Honours ==
Académica

- Taça de Portugal: 2011–12

Braga

- Taça da Liga: 2012–13

Lokomotiv Moscow

- Russian Premier League: 2017–18
- Russian Cup: 2018–19, 2020–21
- Russian Super Cup: 2019

Portugal

- UEFA European Championship: 2016

Orders

- Commander of the Order of Merit
