= Artur Chyorny =

Russian footballer

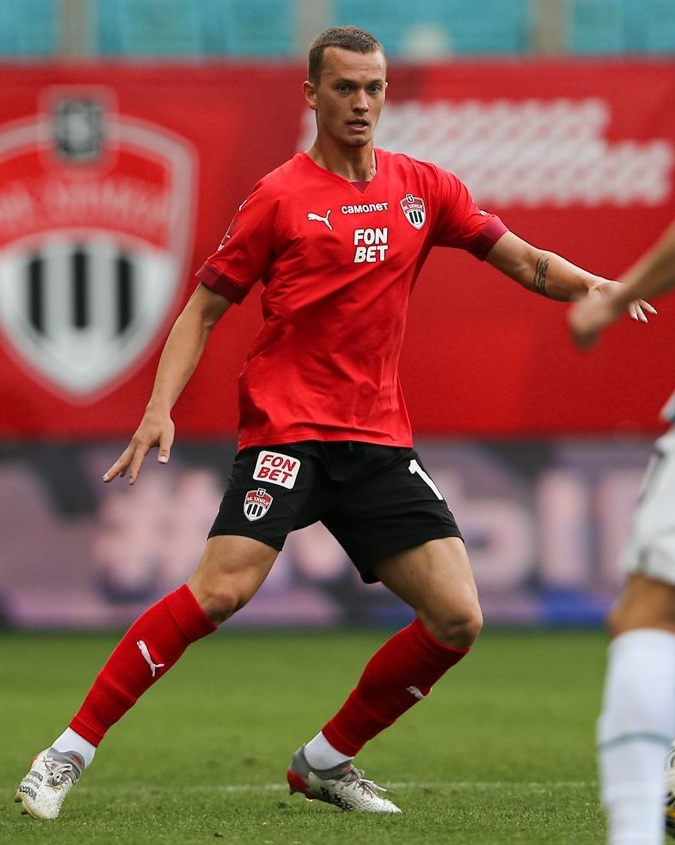
- Chyorny with Khimki in 2022

Personal information
- Full name: Artur Gariyevich Chyorny
- Date of birth: 11 February 2000 (age 26)
- Place of birth: Vladikavkaz, Russia
- Height: 1.87 m (6 ft 2 in)
- Position: Defender

Team information
- Current team: FC Shinnik Yaroslavl
- Number: 27

Youth career
- 2017–2019: FC Lokomotiv Moscow

Senior career*
Years	Team	Apps	(Gls)
2019–2022	FC Kazanka Moscow	33	(2)
2020–2022	FC Lokomotiv Moscow	3	(0)
2022–2024	FC Khimki	12	(0)
2023	→ FC Khimki-M	5	(0)
2023–2024	→ FC Zenit-2 Saint Petersburg (loan)	26	(0)
2024–	FC Shinnik Yaroslavl	41	(0)
- * Club domestic league appearances and goals as of 16 May 2026

Artur Gariyevich Chyorny (Russian: Артур Гариевич Чёрный; born 11 February 2000) is a Russian football player who plays as a centre-back or right-back for FC Shinnik Yaroslavl.

== Club career ==
He made his debut in the Russian Premier League for FC Lokomotiv Moscow on 22 July 2020 in a game against FC Ural Yekaterinburg, replacing Aleksei Miranchuk in added time.

On 14 July 2022, Chyorny signed a three-year contract with FC Khimki.

On 9 July 2024, Chyorny moved to FC Shinnik Yaroslavl in the Russian First League on a two-year deal.

== Career statistics ==
As of 27 November 2022

Club	Season	League			Cup		Continental		Total	
Club	Season	Division	Apps	Goals	Apps	Goals	Apps	Goals	Apps	Goals
Kazanka Moscow	2019–20	FNL2	13	0	–		–		13	0
Kazanka Moscow	2020–21	FNL2	16	2	–		–		16	2
Kazanka Moscow	2021–22	FNL2	4	0	–		–		4	0
Kazanka Moscow	Total		33	2	0	0	0	0	33	2
Lokomotiv Moscow	2019–20	RPL	1	0	0	0	0	0	1	0
Lokomotiv Moscow	2020–21	RPL	0	0	0	0	0	0	0	0
Lokomotiv Moscow	2021–22	RPL	2	0	1	0	0	0	3	0
Lokomotiv Moscow	Total		3	0	1	0	0	0	4	0
Khimki	2022–23	RPL	10	0	4	0	–		14	0
Career total			46	2	5	0	0	0	51	2
