= Dmitri Barinov =

Russian footballer (born 1996)

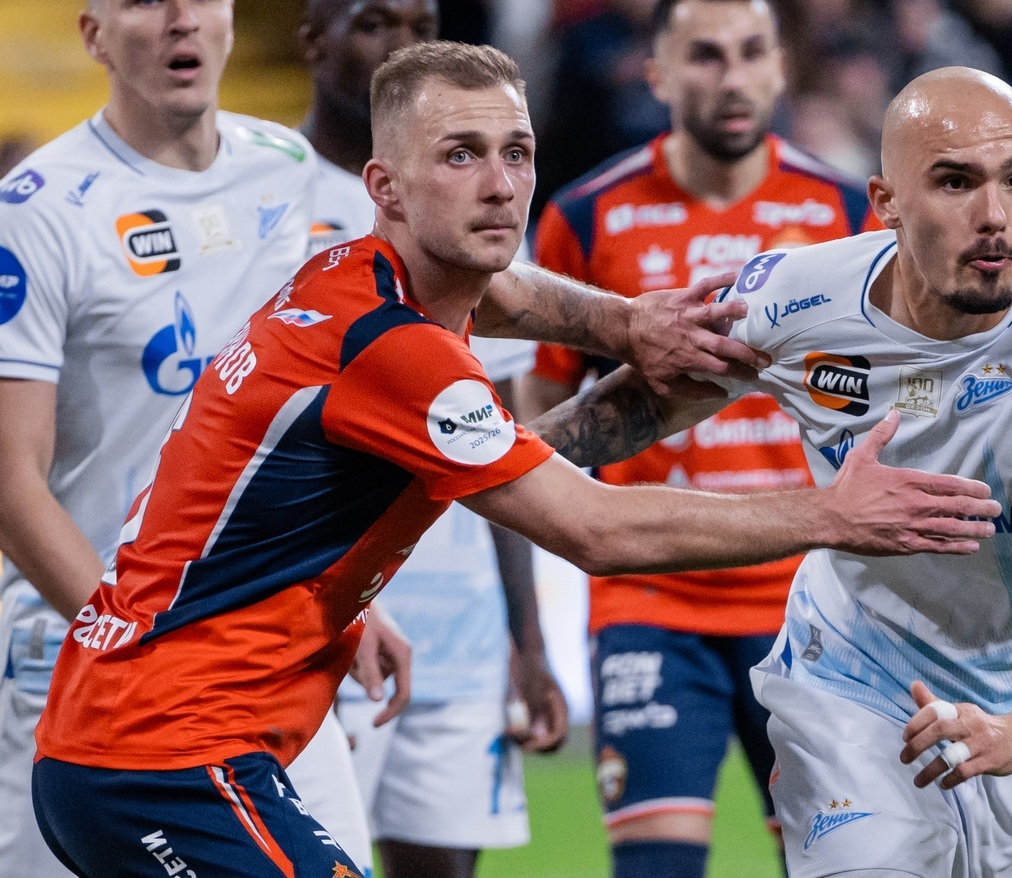
- Barinov with CSKA Moscow in 2026

Personal information
- Full name: Dmitri Nikolayevich Barinov
- Date of birth: 11 September 1996 (age 30)
- Place of birth: Ogudnevo, Moscow Oblast, Russia
- Height: 1.81 m (5 ft 11 in)
- Position: Defensive midfielder

Team information
- Current team: CSKA Moscow
- Number: 6

Youth career
- 2004–2006: Spartak Shchyolkovo
- 2006–2009: Olimp Fryazino
- 2009–2012: Master-Saturn Yegoryevsk
- 2012–2016: Lokomotiv Moscow

Senior career*
Years	Team	Apps	(Gls)
2015–2026	Lokomotiv Moscow	211	(12)
2026–	CSKA Moscow	15	(0)

International career^{‡}
2013	Russia U-17	18	(2)
2014	Russia U-18	4	(0)
2014–2016	Russia U-19	14	(1)
2015–2017	Russia U-21	14	(2)
2019–	Russia	28	(0)
- * Club domestic league appearances and goals as of 22 August 2026 ‡ National team caps and goals as of 9 June 2026

Dmitri Nikolayevich Barinov (Russian: Дми́трий Никола́евич Ба́ринов; born 11 September 1996) is a Russian professional footballer who plays as a midfielder for CSKA Moscow and the Russia national team.

== Club career ==
Born in Moscow Oblast, Barinov started playing football in his hometown region, before joining football school Master-Saturn Yegoryevsk in 2010. In 2012, Lokomotiv Moscow signed Barinov, and he started training with main squad after just one year.

On 16 May 2015, he made his professional debut for Lokomotiv Moscow in a 3-0 win against FC Rubin Kazan in Russian Premier League.

On 24 May 2023, Barinov extended his contract with Lokomotiv until June 2026.

On 13 January 2026, Barinov signed with CSKA Moscow until June 2029.

== International career ==
He won the 2013 UEFA European Under-17 Championship with Russia, scoring in the semifinal penalty shootout against Sweden. He also participated in the 2013 FIFA U-17 World Cup. Later, he represented Russia national under-19 football team at the 2015 UEFA European Under-19 Championship, where Russia came in second place, and he was selected to the team of the tournament.

He made his debut for the senior Russia national football team on 8 June 2019 in a Euro 2020 qualifier against San Marino, as a 73rd-minute substitute for Roman Zobnin.

On 11 May 2021, he was included in the preliminary extended 30-man squad for UEFA Euro 2020. On 2 June 2021, he was included in the final squad. He started Russia's opening game against Belgium on 12 June 2021 and was substituted at half-time as Russia lost 0–3. He played the full match in Russia's second game against Finland on 16 June in a 1–0 victory. He did not appear in Russia's last group game against Denmark as Russia lost 1–4 and was eliminated.

== Career statistics ==
=== Club ===
As of match played 22 August 2026

Appearances and goals by club, season and competition
Club	Season	League			Cup		Europe		Other		Total	
Club	Season	Division	Apps	Goals	Apps	Goals	Apps	Goals	Apps	Goals	Apps	Goals
Lokomotiv Moscow	2014–15	Russian Premier League	2	0	0	0	0	0	—		2	0
Lokomotiv Moscow	2015–16	Russian Premier League	2	0	2	0	0	0	0	0	4	0
Lokomotiv Moscow	2016–17	Russian Premier League	12	0	3	0	—		—		15	0
Lokomotiv Moscow	2017–18	Russian Premier League	16	1	0	0	2 (Note: Appearances in UEFA Europa League)	0	1 (Note: Appearance in Russian Super Cup)	0	19	1
Lokomotiv Moscow	2018–19	Russian Premier League	23	1	5	1	4 (Note: Appearances in UEFA Champions League)	0	1	0	33	2
Lokomotiv Moscow	2019–20	Russian Premier League	23	1	0	0	5	1	1	0	29	2
Lokomotiv Moscow	2020–21	Russian Premier League	13	1	3	0	0	0	1	0	17	1
Lokomotiv Moscow	2021–22	Russian Premier League	23	0	1	0	5	0	1	0	30	0
Lokomotiv Moscow	2022–23	Russian Premier League	27	3	7	0	—		—		34	3
Lokomotiv Moscow	2023–24	Russian Premier League	27	2	5	0	—		—		32	2
Lokomotiv Moscow	2024–25	Russian Premier League	26	0	9	0	—		—		35	0
Lokomotiv Moscow	2025–26	Russian Premier League	17	3	7	0	—		—		24	3
Lokomotiv Moscow	Total		211	12	42	1	16	1	5	0	274	14
CSKA Moscow	2025–26	Russian Premier League	12	0	3	0	—		—		15	0
CSKA Moscow	2026–27	Russian Premier League	3	0	2	0	—		—		5	0
CSKA Moscow	Total		15	0	5	0	0	0	0	0	20	0
Career total			226	12	47	1	16	1	5	0	294	14

=== International ===
As of match played 9 June 2026

Appearances and goals by national team and year
National team	Year	Apps	Goals
Russia	2019	4	0
Russia	2021	9	0
Russia	2022	2	0
Russia	2023	2	0
Russia	2024	1	0
Russia	2025	5	0
Russia	2025	5	0
Russia	2026	5	0
Total		28	0

== Honours ==
Lokomotiv Moscow

- Russian Premier League: 2017–18
- Russian Cup: 2016–17, 2018–19, 2020–21
- Russian Super Cup: 2019

Russia U17

- UEFA European Under-17 Championship: 2013

Russia U19

- UEFA European Under-19 Championship runner-up: 2015

Individual

- Russian Premier League Goal of the Month: November/December 2025 (scored on 30 November 2025 against Rostov)
