= Vladislav Ignatyev =

Russian footballer

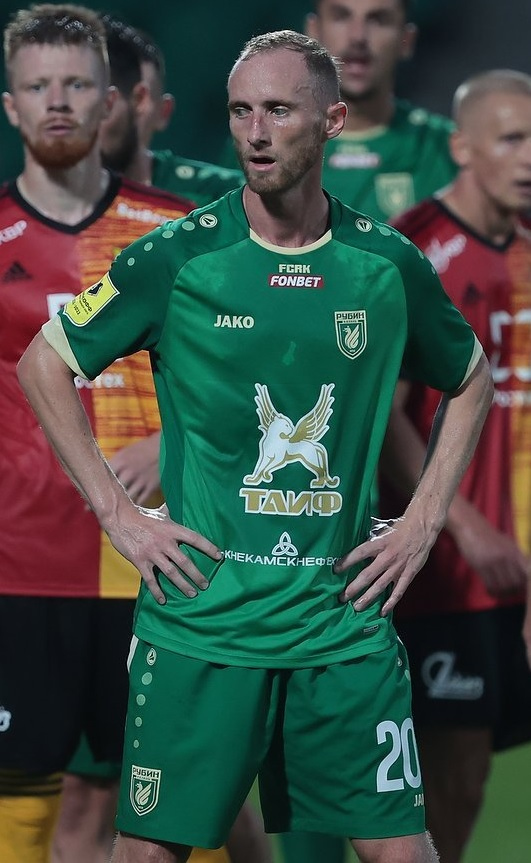
- Ignatyev with Rubin in 2021

Personal information
- Full name: Vladislav Vyacheslavovich Ignatyev
- Date of birth: 20 January 1987 (age 39)
- Place of birth: Brezhnev, Russian SFSR, Soviet Union
- Height: 1.80 m (5 ft 11 in)
- Positions: Defender; midfielder

Youth career
- 1995–2003: DYuSSh Zarya Naberezhnye Chelny

Senior career*
Years	Team	Apps	(Gls)
2004–2005	Neftekhimik	39	(6)
2006–2008	KAMAZ	78	(9)
2009	Krylia Sovetov Samara	25	(1)
2010–2012	Lokomotiv Moscow	36	(4)
2010	→ Kuban Krasnodar (loan)	13	(1)
2012–2013	Krasnodar	27	(1)
2013–2016	Kuban Krasnodar	58	(13)
2016–2021	Lokomotiv Moscow	113	(8)
2021–2022	Rubin Kazan	11	(1)

International career
2011	Russia-2	2	(1)
2015–2019	Russia	5	(0)
- * Club domestic league appearances and goals

Vladislav Vyacheslavovich Ignatyev (Russian: Владислав Вячеславович Игнатьев; born 20 January 1987) is a Russian former professional footballer who played as a right-back or right midfielder.

== Club career ==
He made his debut in the Russian Premier League on 10 April 2009 for FC Krylia Sovetov Samara in a game against FC Khimki.

In December 2009, the RFU labour disputes committee made Ignatyev a free agent, which enabled him to leave Krylia Sovetov and join any other club. On 25 December 2009, Ignatyev signed a 5-year contract with Lokomotiv.

On 29 May 2012, Ignatyev signed for FC Krasnodar.

On 10 February 2016, he returned to FC Lokomotiv Moscow.

On 30 June 2021, he signed a one-year contract with FC Rubin Kazan.

=== Career statistics ===
As of 21 May 2022

Club	Season	League			Cup		Continental		Other		Total	
Club	Season	Division	Apps	Goals	Apps	Goals	Apps	Goals	Apps	Goals	Apps	Goals
Neftekhimik Nizhnekamsk	2004	FNL	4	0	0	0	–		–		4	0
Neftekhimik Nizhnekamsk	2005	PFL	35	6	1	0	–		–		36	6
Neftekhimik Nizhnekamsk	Total		39	6	1	0	0	0	0	0	40	6
KAMAZ Naberezhnye Chelny	2006	FNL	15	3	0	0	–		–		15	3
KAMAZ Naberezhnye Chelny	2007	FNL	30	1	2	0	–		–		32	1
KAMAZ Naberezhnye Chelny	2008	FNL	33	5	2	1	–		–		35	6
KAMAZ Naberezhnye Chelny	Total		78	9	4	1	0	0	0	0	82	10
Krylia Sovetov Samara	2009	RPL	25	1	1	0	2 (Note: Appearances in the UEFA Europa League)	0	–		28	1
Lokomotiv Moscow	2010	RPL	0	0	0	0	0	0	–		0	0
Lokomotiv Moscow	2011–12	RPL	36	4	3	1	8	2	–		47	7
Kuban Krasnodar (loan)	2010	FNL	13	1	–		–		–		13	1
Krasnodar	2012–13	RPL	27	1	1	0	–		–		28	1
Kuban Krasnodar	2013–14	RPL	14	2	0	0	4	1	–		18	3
Kuban Krasnodar	2014–15	RPL	27	4	5	1	–		–		32	5
Kuban Krasnodar	2015–16	RPL	17	7	0	0	–		–		17	7
Kuban Krasnodar	Total		71	14	5	1	4	1	0	0	80	16
Lokomotiv Moscow	2015–16	RPL	7	1	–		0	0	–		7	1
Lokomotiv Moscow	2016–17	RPL	17	2	3	0	–		–		20	2
Lokomotiv Moscow	2017–18	RPL	24	0	0	0	9	0	1 (Note: Appearances in the Russian Super Cup)	0	34	0
Lokomotiv Moscow	2018–19	RPL	26	1	4	0	6 (Note: Appearances in the UEFA Champions League)	1	1	0	37	2
Lokomotiv Moscow	2019–20	RPL	23	1	0	0	5	0	–		28	1
Lokomotiv Moscow	2020–21	RPL	16	3	1	0	5	0	1	0	23	3
Lokomotiv Moscow	Total		149	12	11	1	33	3	3	0	196	16
Rubin Kazan	2021–22	RPL	11	1	1	0	2 (Note: Appearances in the UEFA Europa Conference League)	0	–		14	1
Career total			400	44	24	3	41	4	3	0	468	51

== International ==
In 2015, he was called up for the Russia national football team for the first time. He made his debut for the national team on 14 November 2015 in a game against Portugal.

On 11 May 2018, he was included in Russia's extended 2018 FIFA World Cup squad as a back-up. He was not included in the finalized World Cup squad.

== Honours ==
Lokomotiv Moscow

- Russian Premier League: 2017–18
- Russian Cup: 2016–17, 2018–19, 2020–21
