= Anton Kochenkov =

Kyrgyzstani footballer (born 1987)

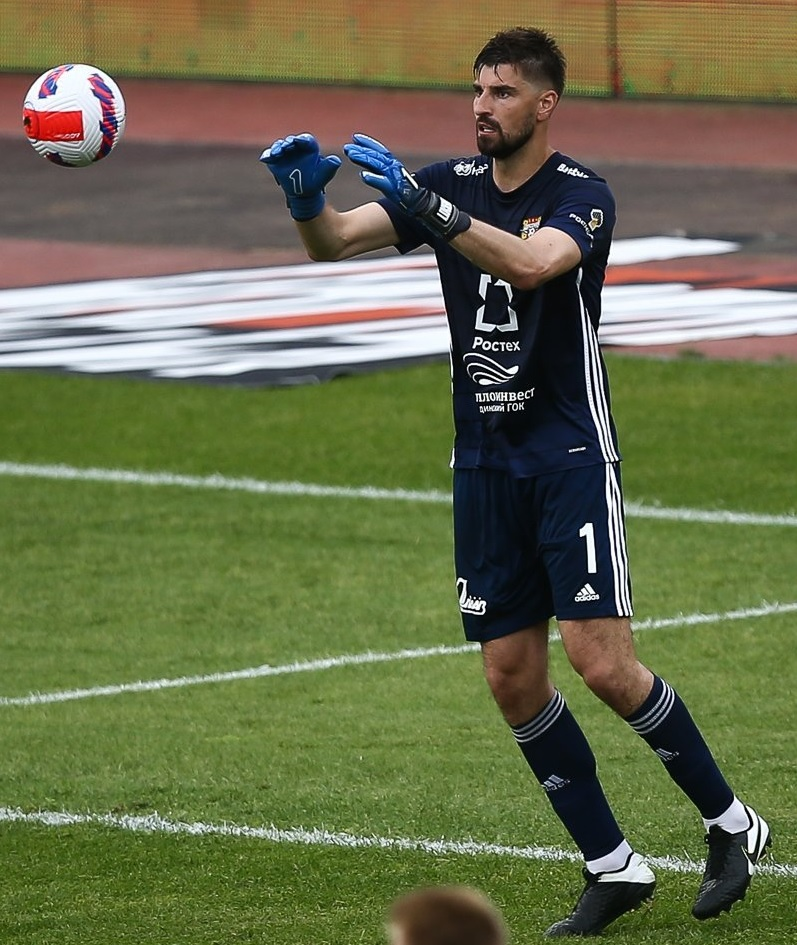
- Kochenkov with Arsenal Tula in 2021

Personal information
- Full name: Anton Aleksandrovich Kochenkov
- Date of birth: 2 April 1987 (age 39)
- Place of birth: Bishkek, Kyrgyz SSR
- Height: 1.97 m (6 ft 6 in)
- Position: Goalkeeper

Youth career
- Alga Bishkek
- –2008: Lokomotiv Moscow

Senior career*
Years	Team	Apps	(Gls)
2008	Lokomotiv Moscow	0	(0)
2008	→ Nizhny Novgorod (loan)	18	(0)
2009	Nizhny Novgorod	35	(0)
2010–2012	Volga Nizhny Novgorod	24	(0)
2011	→ Rostov (loan)	17	(0)
2012–2013	Spartak Nalchik	32	(0)
2013–2015	Mordovia Saransk	58	(0)
2015–2021	Lokomotiv Moscow	20	(0)
2015	→ Krasnodar (loan)	0	(0)
2016	→ Tom Tomsk (loan)	12	(0)
2021–2023	Arsenal Tula	31	(0)

International career
2023	Kyrgyzstan	1	(0)
- * Club domestic league appearances and goals

Anton Aleksandrovich Kochenkov (Russian: Антон Александрович Коченков; born 2 April 1987) is a Kyrgyzstani former professional football player whose position was a goalkeeper.

== Club career ==
On 2 August 2021, he joined FC Arsenal Tula.

== International career ==
Kochenkov was born in Kyrgyzstan and moved to Russia at a young age, holding both citizenships. He was called up to the Kyrgyzstan national team in January 2023.

== Career statistics ==
=== Club ===
As of 21 May 2022

Club	Season	League			Cup		Continental		Other		Total	
Club	Season	Division	Apps	Goals	Apps	Goals	Apps	Goals	Apps	Goals	Apps	Goals
Nizhny Novgorod	2008	PFL	18	0	0	0	–		–		18	0
Nizhny Novgorod	2009	FNL	35	0	2	0	–		–		37	0
Nizhny Novgorod	Total		53	0	2	0	0	0	0	0	55	0
Volga Nizhny Novgorod	2010	FNL	24	0	1	0	–		–		25	0
Rostov	2011–12	RPL	17	0	3	0	–		–		20	0
Spartak Nalchik	2012–13	FNL	32	0	1	0	–		4 (Note: Two appearances in promotion play-offs, two appearances in the FNL Cup)	0	37	0
Mordovia Saransk	2013–14	FNL	28	0	3	0	–		3 (Note: Appearances in the FNL Cup)	0	34	0
Mordovia Saransk	2014–15	RPL	30	0	3	0	–		–		33	0
Mordovia Saransk	Total		58	0	6	0	0	0	3	0	67	0
Lokomotiv Moscow	2015–16	RPL	0	0	0	0	0	0	–		0	0
Lokomotiv Moscow	2016–17	RPL	0	0	0	0	–		–		0	0
Lokomotiv Moscow	2017–18	RPL	7	0	0	0	3 (Note: Appearances in the UEFA Europa League)	0	–		10	0
Lokomotiv Moscow	2018–19	RPL	0	0	2	0	0	0	–		2	0
Lokomotiv Moscow	2019–20	RPL	7	0	1	0	1 (Note: Appearance in the UEFA Champions League)	0	–		9	0
Lokomotiv Moscow	2020–21	RPL	6	0	0	0	0	0	–		6	0
Lokomotiv Moscow	Total		20	0	3	0	4	0	0	0	27	0
Krasnodar (loan)	2015–16	RPL	0	0	0	0	0	0	–		0	0
Tom Tomsk (loan)	2016–17	RPL	12	0	1	0	–		–		13	0
Arsenal Tula	2021–22	RPL	19	0	1	0	–		–		20	0
Career total			235	0	18	0	4	0	7	0	264	0

== Honours ==
=== Club ===
Lokomotiv Moscow

- Russian Premier League (1): 2017–18
- Russian Cup (1): 2018–19
