= Anton Miranchuk =

Russian footballer (born 1995)

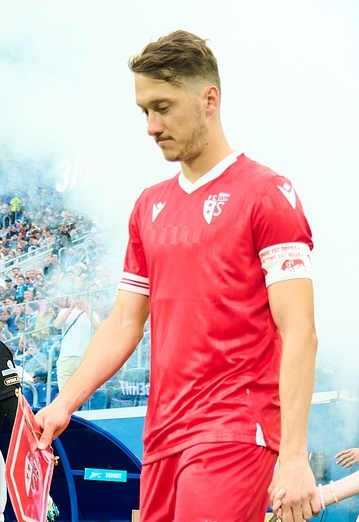
- Miranchuk with Sion in 2025

Personal information
- Full name: Anton Andreyevich Miranchuk
- Date of birth: 17 October 1995 (age 31)
- Place of birth: Slavyansk-na-Kubani, Russia
- Height: 1.84 m (6 ft 0 in)
- Position: Attacking midfielder

Team information
- Current team: Dynamo Moscow
- Number: 21

Youth career
- 2008–2010: Olymp Slavyansk-na-Kubani
- 2011: Spartak Moscow
- 2011–2017: Lokomotiv Moscow

Senior career*
Years	Team	Apps	(Gls)
2013–2024	Lokomotiv Moscow	164	(37)
2016	→ Levadia Tallinn (loan)	30	(14)
2024–2025	Sion	25	(2)
2025–	Dynamo Moscow	21	(3)

International career^{‡}
2013	Russia U18	8	(0)
2013	Russia U19	2	(0)
2016	Russia U21	1	(0)
2017–	Russia	37	(7)
- * Club domestic league appearances and goals as of 31 October 2026 ‡ National team caps and goals as of 9 June 2026

Anton Andreyevich Miranchuk (Russian: Антон Андреевич Миранчук, IPA: [ɐnˈton ɐnˈdrʲe(j)ɪvʲɪtɕ mʲɪrɐnˈtɕuk]; born 17 October 1995) is a Russian professional footballer who plays as an attacking midfielder for Dynamo Moscow and Russia national team.

== Club career ==
=== Youth career ===
Born in Slavyansk-na-Kubani, Miranchuk joined Spartak Moscow from his hometown football school Olymp. He was dismissed from the club because of weak physical abilities. After that, he and his twin brother Aleksei moved to Lokomotiv Moscow.

=== Lokomotiv Moscow ===
On 30 October 2013, Miranchuk made his competitive debut in senior football in a Russian Cup game against Rotor Volgograd replacing Victor Obinna in the 88th minute.

==== Loan to Levadia ====
On 2 February 2016, Miranchuk was sent on loan to Estonian club Levadia Tallinn. He made his debut for the new team on 2 April 2016, in a 1–1 home draw with Nõmme Kalju. On 30 June 2016, Miranchuk made his debut in UEFA Europa League, in a 1–1 draw with Faroese side HB in a first qualifying round. By the end of 2016 Meistriliiga season, he scored 14 goals.

==== Return to Lokomotiv Moscow ====
Miranchuk made his debut in the Russian Premier League for Lokomotiv Moscow on 9 April 2017 in a game against FC Rostov. On 24 October 2018, he scored his first UEFA Champions League goal in a 3–1 home defeat against Porto in the 2018–19 season. On 27 October 2020, he scored a goal in a 1–2 home defeat against Bayern Munich in the 2020–21 UEFA Champions League. He scored again on 3 November against Atlético Madrid in the same competition.

Miranchuk left Lokomotiv in July 2024 as a free agent.

=== Sion ===
On 8 September 2024, Miranchuk signed a two-season contract with Swiss Super League club Sion.

=== Dynamo Moscow ===
On 23 August 2025, Miranchuk returned to Russia and signed a two-year contract with Dynamo Moscow.

== International career ==
Miranchuk made his debut for Russia national football team on 7 October 2017 in a friendly game against South Korea.

On 11 May 2018, he was included in Russia's extended 2018 FIFA World Cup squad. On 3 June 2018, he was included in the finalized World Cup squad. He did not make any appearances at the tournament as Russia was eliminated by Croatia in the quarterfinal shoot-out.

== Personal life ==
He is the identical twin brother of Atlanta United midfielder Aleksei Miranchuk, who is also his teammate on the Russia national team.

== Career statistics ==
=== Club ===
As of match played 31 October 2026

Appearances and goals by club, season and competition
Club	Season	League			National cup (Note: Includes Russian Cup, Estonian Cup, Swiss Cup)		Europe		Other		Total	
Club	Season	Division	Apps	Goals	Apps	Goals	Apps	Goals	Apps	Goals	Apps	Goals
Lokomotiv Moscow	2013–14	Russian Premier League	0	0	1	0	—		—		1	0
Lokomotiv Moscow	2014–15	Russian Premier League	0	0	0	0	0	0	—		0	0
Lokomotiv Moscow	2015–16	Russian Premier League	0	0	0	0	0	0	0	0	0	0
Lokomotiv Moscow	2016–17	Russian Premier League	3	0	0	0	—		—		3	0
Lokomotiv Moscow	2017–18	Russian Premier League	29	4	1	0	10 (Note: Appearance(s) in UEFA Europa League)	1	1 (Note: Appearance in Russian Super Cup)	0	41	5
Lokomotiv Moscow	2018–19	Russian Premier League	26	11	7	4	6 (Note: Appearance(s) in UEFA Champions League)	1	1	0	40	16
Lokomotiv Moscow	2019–20	Russian Premier League	17	3	0	0	1	0	1	0	19	3
Lokomotiv Moscow	2020–21	Russian Premier League	23	4	2	0	6	3	1	0	32	7
Lokomotiv Moscow	2021–22	Russian Premier League	9	1	0	0	0	0	1	0	10	1
Lokomotiv Moscow	2022–23	Russian Premier League	28	8	6	3	—		—		34	11
Lokomotiv Moscow	2023–24	Russian Premier League	29	6	9	2	—		—		38	8
Lokomotiv Moscow	Total		164	37	26	9	23	5	5	0	218	51
Levadia Tallinn (loan)	2016	Meistriliiga	30	14	1	0	4	1	—		35	15
FC Sion	2024–25	Swiss Super League	24	2	0	0	—		—		24	2
FC Sion	2025–26	Swiss Super League	1	0	0	0	—		—		1	0
FC Sion	Total		25	2	0	0	0	0	0	0	25	2
Dynamo Moscow	2025–26	Russian Premier League	14	1	5	0	—		—		19	1
Dynamo Moscow	2026–27	Russian Premier League	7	2	4	0	—		—		11	2
Dynamo Moscow	Total		21	3	9	0	0	0	0	0	30	3
Career total			240	56	36	9	27	6	5	0	308	71

=== International ===
As of match played 9 June 2026

Appearances and goals by national team and year
National team	Year	Apps	Goals
Russia	2017	2	0
Russia	2018	5	0
Russia	2019	4	1
Russia	2020	8	2
Russia	2022	2	0
Russia	2023	5	3
Russia	2024	2	1
Russia	2025	6	0
Russia	2026	3	0
Total		37	7

International goals

Scores and results list Russia's goal tally first, score column indicates score after each Miranchuk goal.

List of international goals scored by Anton Miranchuk
No.	Date	Venue	Opponent	Score	Result	Competition
1	8 June 2019	Mordovia Arena, Saransk, Russia	San Marino	4–0	9–0	UEFA Euro 2020 qualification
2	6 September 2020	Puskás Aréna, Budapest, Hungary	Hungary	1–0	3–2	2020–21 UEFA Nations League B
3	11 October 2020	VTB Arena, Moscow, Russia	Turkey	1–0	1–1	2020–21 UEFA Nations League B
4	23 March 2023	Azadi Stadium, Tehran, Iran	Iran	1–0	1–1	Friendly
5	26 March 2023	Krestovsky Stadium, Saint Petersburg, Russia	Iraq	1–0	2–0	Friendly
6	20 November 2023	Volgograd Arena, Volgograd, Russia	Cuba	3–0	8–0	Friendly
7	21 March 2024	VTB Arena, Moscow, Russia	Serbia	1–0	4–0	Friendly

== Honours ==
Lokomotiv Moscow

- Russian Premier League: 2017–18
- Russian Cup: 2018–19, 2020–21
- Russian Super Cup: 2019

Individual

- Meistriliiga Player of the Month: May 2016
