= Vitali Botnar =

Russian footballer

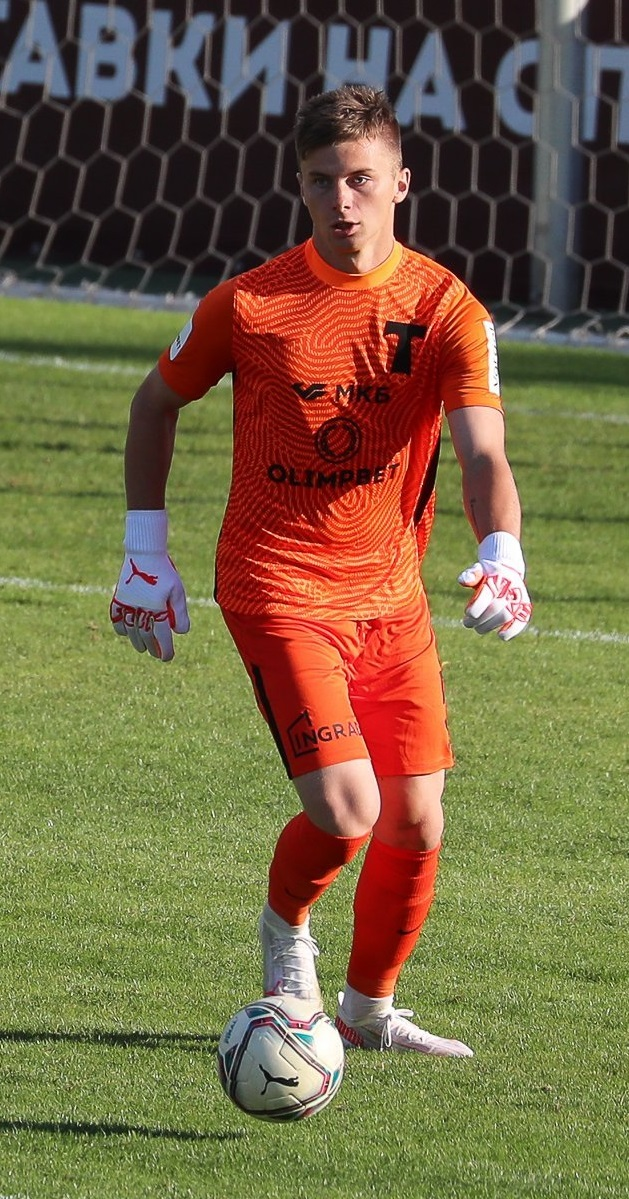
- Botnar with Torpedo Moscow in 2021

Personal information
- Full name: Vitali Valeryevich Botnar
- Date of birth: 19 May 2001 (age 25)
- Place of birth: Bălți, Moldova
- Height: 1.88 m (6 ft 2 in)
- Position: Goalkeeper

Team information
- Current team: SKA-Khabarovsk
- Number: 16

Youth career
- 2013–2014: SShOR №27 Sokol Moscow
- 2014–2019: Lokomotiv Moscow

Senior career*
Years	Team	Apps	(Gls)
2019	Kazanka Moscow	1	(0)
2020–2023	Torpedo Moscow	65	(0)
2023–2024	Pari Nizhny Novgorod	0	(0)
2024–2025	Torpedo Moscow	22	(0)
2025–	SKA-Khabarovsk	0	(0)
2026	→ Irtysh Pavlodar (loan)	13	(0)

International career^{‡}
2017	Russia U-16	3	(0)
2017–2018	Russia U-17	4	(0)
2018–2019	Russia U-18	6	(0)
2019	Russia U-19	2	(0)
- * Club domestic league appearances and goals as of 30 June 2026 ‡ National team caps and goals as of 19 November 2019

Vitali Valeryevich Botnar (Russian: Виталий Валерьевич Ботнарь; born 19 May 2001) is a Russian football player of Moldovan origin who plays for FC SKA-Khabarovsk.

== Club career ==
He made his debut in the Russian Professional Football League for FC Kazanka Moscow on 6 September 2019 in a game against FC Dolgoprudny.

He made his debut in the Russian Football National League for FC Torpedo Moscow on 9 March 2020 in a game against FC Avangard Kursk. He played the full match.

Botnar made his Russian Premier League debut for FC Torpedo Moscow on 17 July 2022 against PFC Sochi.

On 15 July 2023, Botnar signed a three-year contract with FC Pari Nizhny Novgorod.

On 1 February 2024, Botnar returned to FC Torpedo Moscow.

== Honours ==
Torpedo Moscow

- Russian Football National League : 2021-22

== Career statistics ==
As of 24 May 2025

Club	Season	League			Cup		Continental		Total	
Club	Season	Division	Apps	Goals	Apps	Goals	Apps	Goals	Apps	Goals
Kazanka Moscow	2019–20	Russian Second League	1	0	–		–		1	0
Torpedo Moscow	2019–20	Russian First League	2	0	1	0	–		3	0
Torpedo Moscow	2020–21	Russian First League	23	0	0	0	–		23	0
Torpedo Moscow	2021–22	Russian First League	36	0	0	0	–		36	0
Torpedo Moscow	2022–23	Russian Premier League	4	0	0	0	–		4	0
Torpedo Moscow	Total		65	0	1	0	0	0	66	0
Pari Nizhny Novgorod	2023–24	Russian Premier League	0	0	4	0	–		4	0
Torpedo Moscow	2023–24	Russian First League	6	0	0	0	–		6	0
Torpedo Moscow	2024–25	Russian First League	16	0	1	0	–		17	0
Torpedo Moscow	Total		22	0	1	0	0	0	23	0
Career total			88	0	6	0	0	0	94	0
