= Dmitri Zhivoglyadov =

Russian footballer (born 1994)

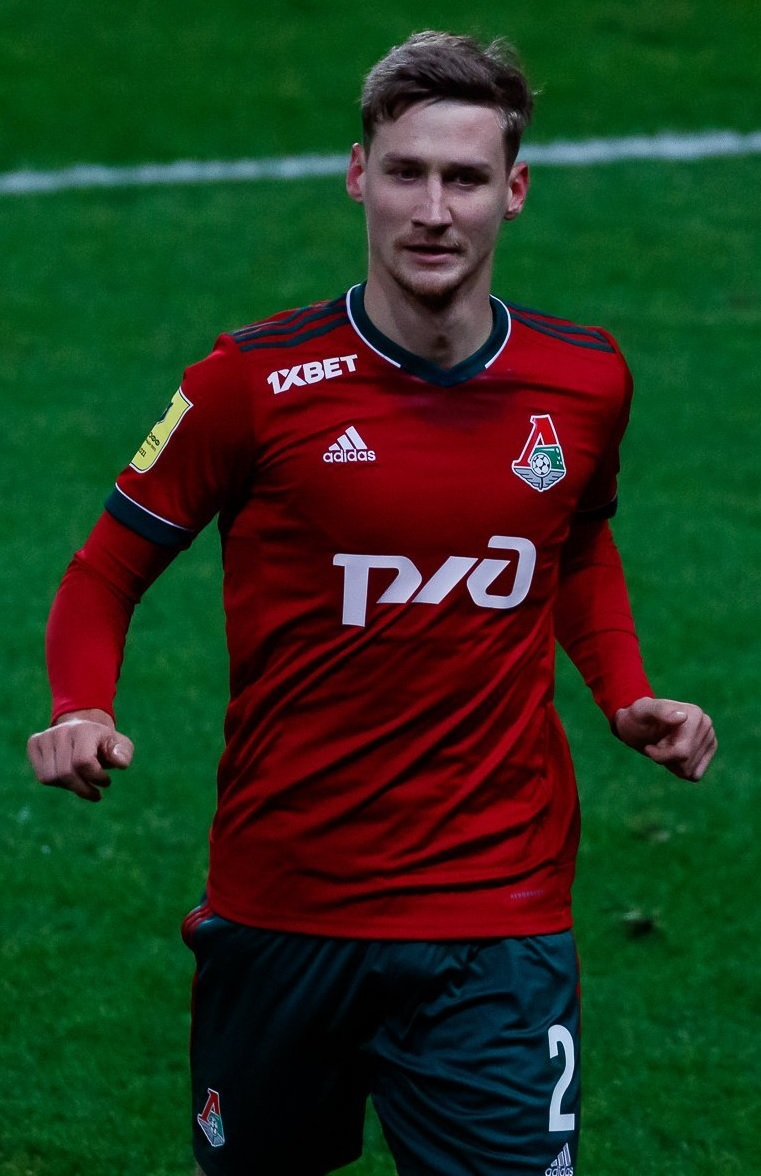
- Zhivoglyadov with Lokomotiv in 2020

Personal information
- Full name: Dmitri Viktorovich Zhivoglyadov
- Date of birth: 29 May 1994 (age 32)
- Place of birth: Dubna, Russia
- Height: 1.78 m (5 ft 10 in)
- Position: Defender

Youth career
- Volna Dubna
- 2006–2009: Lokomotiv Moscow
- 2009–2015: Dynamo Moscow

Senior career*
Years	Team	Apps	(Gls)
2015–2016	Dynamo Moscow	21	(0)
2016–2019	Ufa	69	(2)
2019–2023	Lokomotiv Moscow	75	(0)
2023–2024	Pari Nizhny Novgorod	15	(0)
2025	SKA Rostov-on-Don (amateur)		

International career^{‡}
2012–2013	Russia U-19	7	(0)
2012–2016	Russia U-21	13	(0)
- * Club domestic league appearances and goals as of 20 May 2024 ‡ National team caps and goals as of 11 October 2016

Dmitri Viktorovich Zhivoglyadov (Russian: Дми́трий Ви́кторович Живогля́дов; born 29 May 1994) is a Russian professional footballer who plays as a right-back.

== Club career ==
Zhivoglyadov made his professional debut on 8 August 2015 for Dynamo Moscow in a Russian Premier League game against Anzhi Makhachkala.

On 11 June 2019, he signed a 4-year contract with Lokomotiv Moscow. Zhivoglyadov left Lokomotiv in June 2023.

On 3 July 2023, Zhivoglyadov joined Pari Nizhny Novgorod. His contract was mutually terminated on 14 October 2024.

== International career ==
On 8 November 2020, he was called up to the Russia national football team for the first time for the games against Moldova, Turkey and Serbia.

== Career statistics ==
=== Club ===
As of 1 June 2024

Club	Season	League	League		Cup (Note: Includes Russian Cup.)		Continental (Note: Includes UEFA Europa League and UEFA Champions League.)		Other		Total	
Club	Season	League	Apps	Goals	Apps	Goals	Apps	Goals	Apps	Goals	Apps	Goals
Dynamo Moscow	2015–16	Russian Premier League	21	0	2	0	–		–		23	0
Ufa	2016–17	Russian Premier League	20	0	4	0	–		–		24	0
Ufa	2017–18	Russian Premier League	28	2	0	0	–		–		28	2
Ufa	2018–19	Russian Premier League	21	0	0	0	6	0	2 (Note: Appearances in Relegation play-offs)	0	29	0
Ufa	Total		69	2	4	0	6	0	2	0	81	2
Lokomotiv Moscow	2019–20	Russian Premier League	14	0	1	0	0	0	1 (Note: Appearance in Russian Super Cup)	0	16	0
Lokomotiv Moscow	2020–21	Russian Premier League	24	0	2	0	6	0	0	0	32	0
Lokomotiv Moscow	2021–22	Russian Premier League	21	0	0	0	3	0	1	0	25	0
Lokomotiv Moscow	2022–23	Russian Premier League	16	0	5	0	–		–		21	0
Lokomotiv Moscow	Total		75	0	8	0	9	0	2	0	94	0
Pari Nizhny Novgorod	2023–24	Russian Premier League	15	0	2	0	–		0	0	17	0
Career total			180	2	16	0	15	0	4	0	215	2

== Honours ==
=== Club ===
Lokomotiv Moscow

- Russian Cup: 2020–21
- Russian Super Cup: 2019
