= Aleksei Miranchuk =

Russian footballer (born 1995)

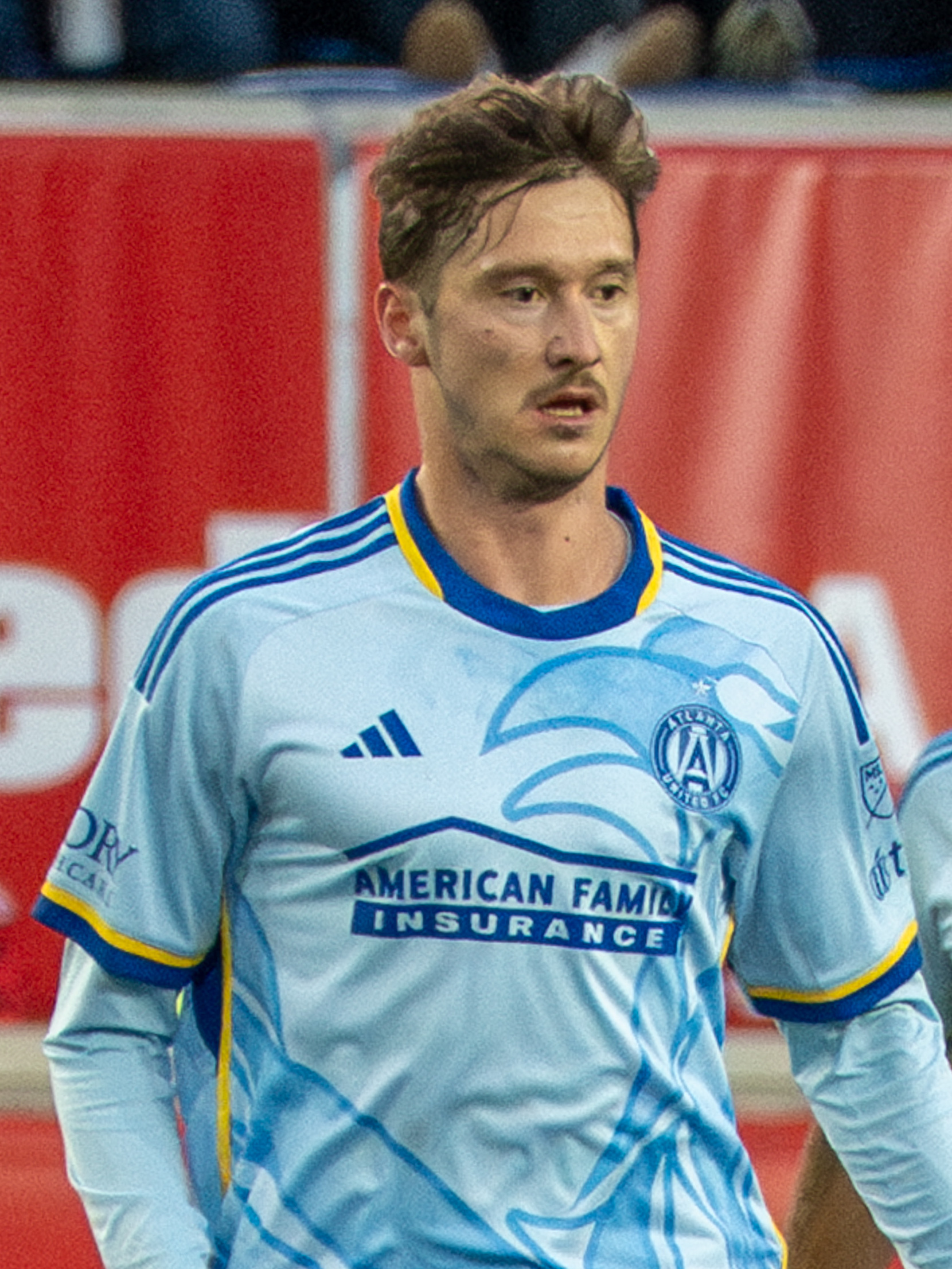
- Miranchuk with Atlanta United in 2025

Personal information
- Full name: Aleksei Andreyevich Miranchuk
- Date of birth: 17 October 1995 (age 31)
- Place of birth: Slavyansk-on-Kuban, Russia
- Height: 1.82 m (6 ft 0 in)
- Positions: Attacking midfielder; forward

Team information
- Current team: Atlanta United
- Number: 59

Youth career
- 2008–2010: Olymp Slavyansk-na-Kubani
- 2010–2011: Spartak Moscow
- 2011–2013: Lokomotiv Moscow

Senior career*
| Years | Team | Apps | (Gls) |
| 2013–2020 | Lokomotiv Moscow | 178 | (32) |
| 2020–2024 | Atalanta | 71 | (9) |
| 2022–2023 | → Torino (loan) | 29 | (4) |
| 2024– | Atlanta United | 74 | (16) |

International career^{‡}
| 2012 | Russia U17 | 5 | (0) |
| 2013 | Russia U19 | 3 | (1) |
| 2013–2016 | Russia U21 | 20 | (1) |
| 2015– | Russia | 58 | (15) |
- * Club domestic league appearances and goals as of 13:28, 15 November 2026 (UTC) ‡ National team caps and goals as of 17 November 2026

Aleksei Andreyevich Miranchuk (Russian: Алексей Андреевич Миранчук, IPA: [ɐlʲɪkˈsʲej ɐnˈdrʲe(j)ɪvʲɪtɕ mʲɪrɐnˈtɕuk]; born 17 October 1995) is a Russian professional footballer who plays as an attacking midfielder or forward for Major League Soccer club Atlanta United and the Russia national team. He is the twin brother of player Anton Miranchuk.

== Early life ==
Born in Slavyansk-on-Kuban to Andrey and Elena Miranchuk, about 10 minutes before his brother Anton, Aleksei and Anton started playing football in his hometown football school Olymp. Then, he and Anton arrived in Moscow, joining the youth ranks of Spartak Moscow. However, they did not last long in this club, being expelled because of their insufficient physical abilities.

Then, the twin brothers were spotted by the managers of Lokomotiv Moscow, who invited them to join the club. Aleksei won three Russian League titles in his age category and scored a goal in the final twice. In October 2012, he was named MVP of the Russian Football Union cup.

== Club career ==
=== Lokomotiv Moscow ===
At the age of 17, Miranchuk made his debut in the Russian Premier League for Lokomotiv Moscow on 20 April 2013 as a starter in away game versus Kuban (0–0). On 5 May 2013, Miranchuk scored his first senior goal and made first assist in away game against Amkar which Lokomotiv won 4–2. He scored a header from Maicon pass in the first half and provided an assist for Renat Yanbayev in the second half.

He made his debut in UEFA Europa League on 28 August 2014, coming on as a second-half substitution for Manuel Fernandes in a 1–4 defeat to Cypriot side Apollon Limassol.

His performances got him the title of the best Lokomotiv player of the month by fans' poll on social networks in April 2015 and May 2015.

On 21 May 2015, Miranchuk scored a solo goal against Kuban Krasnodar in extra time of the Russian Cup final, helping Lokomotiv win the sixth Russian Cup title in the club's history.

Later on, he won the 2017–18 Russian Premier League with Lokomotiv, scoring seven goals in that season. On 6 July 2019, he scored two goals in a 3–2 win over Zenit Saint Petersburg in the 2019 Russian Super Cup.

=== Atalanta ===
In August 2020, Miranchuk joined Italian club Atalanta for about €15m. On 30 August 2020, Lokomotiv confirmed that the transfer has been agreed and would be completed following the medical exam. On 21 October 2020, Miranchuk made his debut for Atalanta as a substitute against Midtjylland in the Champions League and scored his first goal for the club. He made his Serie A debut for the club on 8 November and scored his side's goal in a 1–1 draw with Inter Milan. He also scored in his Coppa Italia debut on 14 January 2021, in a 3–1 victory over Cagliari in the round of 16. In two seasons with Atalanta, Miranchuk appeared in 56 matches across all competitions and scored nine goals.

==== Loan to Torino ====
On 11 August 2022, Miranchuk joined Torino on a season-long loan with option to buy.

=== Atlanta United ===
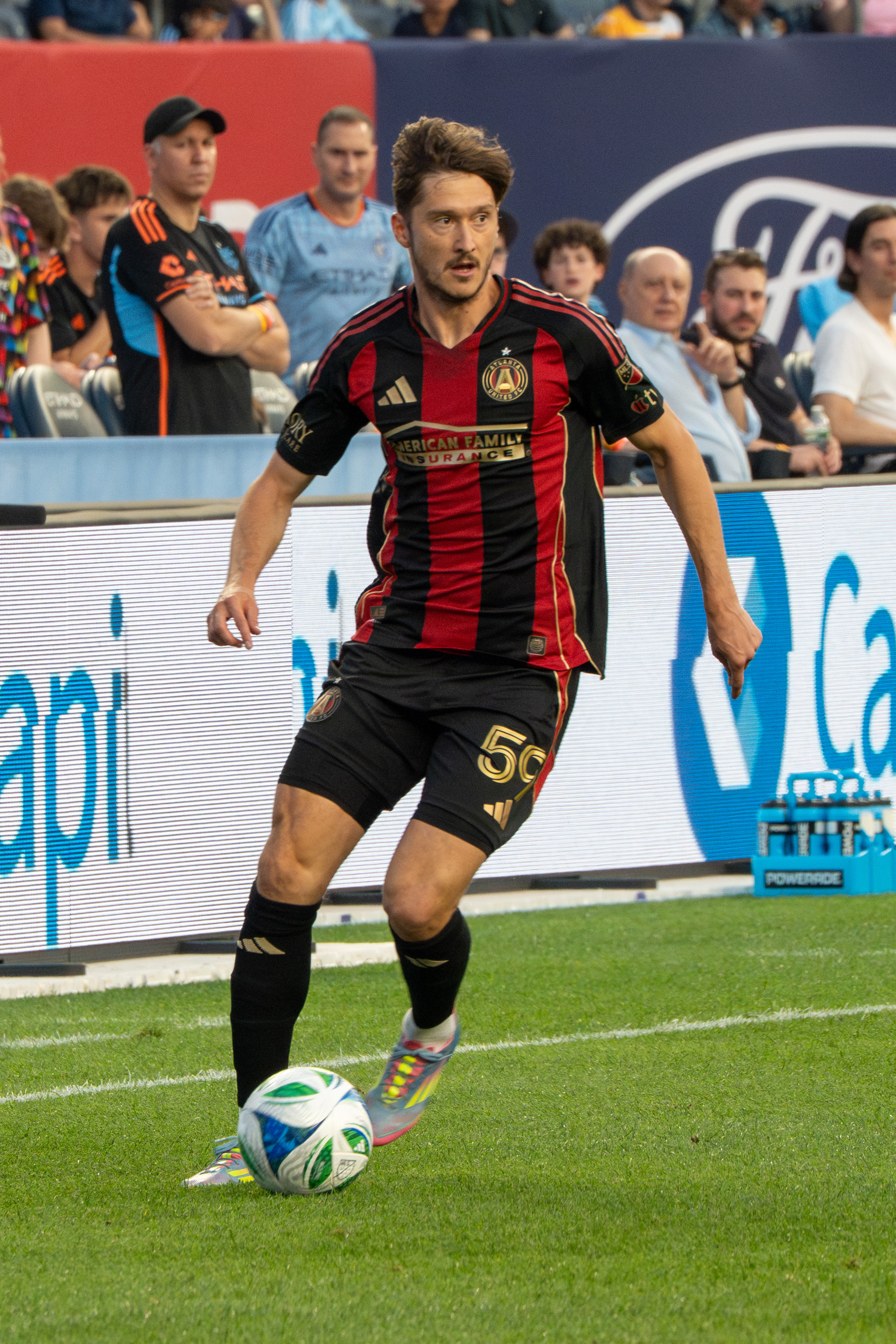
Aleksey Miranchuk during New York City FC vs Atlanta United in 2025

On 30 July 2024, Miranchuk joined Major League Soccer club Atlanta United on a contract until the 2028 MLS season with an option for a further year. On September 18, he scored his first MLS goal, a curling strike from outside the box against Inter Miami in a 2–2 draw.

== International career ==
Miranchuk made his debut for the Russia national football team on 7 June 2015 in a friendly against Belarus at the Arena Khimki, replacing Yuri Zhirkov in the 71st minute and scoring Russia's third of a 4–2 victory twelve minutes later.

On 11 May 2018, he was included in Russia's extended 2018 FIFA World Cup squad. On 3 June 2018, he was included in the finalized World Cup squad. His only World Cup appearance came as a starter in the last group-stage game against Uruguay which Russia lost 0–3 and Miranchuk was substituted by Fyodor Smolov after an hour of play.

On 11 May 2021, he was included in the preliminary extended 30-man squad for UEFA Euro 2020. On 2 June 2021, he was included in the final squad. In Russia's opening game against Belgium on 12 June, he appeared as a second-half substitute as Russia lost 0–3. He started in the match against Finland on 16 June, and scored Russia's lone goal in a 1–0 victory over Finland. He started again on 21 June in the last group game against Denmark as Russia lost 1–4 and was eliminated, and Miranchuk was substituted after an hour of play.

== Career statistics ==
=== Club ===
As of match played 7 November 2026

Appearances and goals by club, season and competition
| Club | Season | League | | | National cup (Note: Includes Russian Cup, Coppa Italia, U.S. Open Cup) | | League cup (Note: Includes MLS Cup playoffs) | | Continental | | Other | | Total | |
| Club | Season | Division | Apps | Goals | Apps | Goals | Apps | Goals | Apps | Goals | Apps | Goals | Apps | Goals |
|---|---|---|---|---|---|---|---|---|---|---|---|---|---|---|
| Lokomotiv Moscow | 2012–13 | Russian Premier League | 6 | 1 | 0 | 0 | — | | — | | — | | 6 | 1 |
| Lokomotiv Moscow | 2013–14 | Russian Premier League | 8 | 1 | 1 | 0 | — | | — | | — | | 9 | 1 |
| Lokomotiv Moscow | 2014–15 | Russian Premier League | 17 | 1 | 3 | 1 | — | | 1 (Note: Appearance(s) in UEFA Europa League) | 0 | — | | 21 | 2 |
| Lokomotiv Moscow | 2015–16 | Russian Premier League | 27 | 2 | 2 | 0 | — | | 6 | 1 | 1 (Note: Appearance in Russian Super Cup) | 0 | 36 | 3 |
| Lokomotiv Moscow | 2016–17 | Russian Premier League | 29 | 3 | 5 | 2 | — | | — | | — | | 34 | 5 |
| Lokomotiv Moscow | 2017–18 | Russian Premier League | 30 | 7 | 1 | 0 | — | | 9 | 1 | 1 | 0 | 41 | 8 |
| Lokomotiv Moscow | 2018–19 | Russian Premier League | 30 | 3 | 7 | 2 | — | | 6 (Note: Appearance(s) in UEFA Champions League) | 0 | 1 | 0 | 44 | 5 |
| Lokomotiv Moscow | 2019–20 | Russian Premier League | 27 | 12 | 0 | 0 | — | | 4 | 2 | 1 | 2 | 32 | 16 |
| Lokomotiv Moscow | 2020–21 | Russian Premier League | 4 | 2 | 0 | 0 | — | | 0 | 0 | 1 | 0 | 5 | 2 |
| Lokomotiv Moscow | Total | | 178 | 32 | 19 | 5 | — | | 26 | 4 | 5 | 2 | 228 | 43 |
| Atalanta | 2020–21 | Serie A | 25 | 4 | 3 | 2 | — | | 3 | 1 | — | | 31 | 7 |
| Atalanta | 2021–22 | Serie A | 19 | 2 | 1 | 0 | — | | 5 (Note: Two appearances in UEFA Champions League, three appearances in UEFA Europa League) | 0 | — | | 25 | 2 |
| Atalanta | 2023–24 | Serie A | 27 | 3 | 5 | 1 | — | | 10 | 0 | — | | 42 | 4 |
| Atalanta | Total | | 71 | 9 | 9 | 3 | — | | 18 | 1 | 0 | 0 | 98 | 13 |
| Torino (loan) | 2022–23 | Serie A | 29 | 4 | 2 | 0 | — | | — | | — | | 31 | 4 |
| Atlanta United | 2024 | Major League Soccer | 9 | 3 | — | | 5 | 0 | — | | — | | 14 | 3 |
| Atlanta United | 2025 | Major League Soccer | 33 | 6 | — | | — | | — | | 3 (Note: Appearances in Leagues Cup) | 2 | 36 | 8 |
| Atlanta United | 2026 | Major League Soccer | 32 | 7 | 3 | 1 | — | | — | | — | | 35 | 8 |
| Atlanta United | Total | | 74 | 16 | 3 | 1 | 5 | 0 | — | | 3 | 2 | 85 | 19 |
| Career total | | | 352 | 61 | 33 | 9 | 5 | 0 | 44 | 5 | 8 | 4 | 442 | 79 |

=== International ===
As of match played 17 November 2026

Appearances and goals by national team and year
| National team | Year | Apps | Goals |
|---|---|---|---|
| Russia | 2015 | 2 | 1 |
| Russia | 2016 | 3 | 0 |
| Russia | 2017 | 9 | 3 |
| Russia | 2018 | 6 | 0 |
| Russia | 2019 | 5 | 1 |
| Russia | 2020 | 3 | 0 |
| Russia | 2021 | 13 | 1 |
| Russia | 2023 | 2 | 0 |
| Russia | 2024 | 3 | 2 |
| Russia | 2025 | 4 | 2 |
| Russia | 2026 | 8 | 5 |
| Total | | 58 | 15 |

Scores and results list Russia's goal tally first, score column indicates score after each Miranchuk goal.

List of international goals scored by Aleksei Miranchuk
| No. | Date | Venue | Opponent | Score | Result | Competition |
|---|---|---|---|---|---|---|
| 1 | 7 June 2015 | Arena Khimki, Khimki, Russia | Belarus | 3–2 | 4–2 | Friendly |
| 2 | 28 March 2017 | Fisht Olympic Stadium, Sochi, Russia | Belgium | 2–3 | 3–3 | Friendly |
| 3 | 7 October 2017 | VEB Arena, Moscow, Russia | South Korea | 4–0 | 4–2 | Friendly |
| 4 | 14 November 2017 | Krestovsky Stadium, Saint Petersburg, Russia | Spain | 2–2 | 3–3 | Friendly |
| 5 | 19 November 2019 | San Marino Stadium, Serravalle, San Marino | San Marino | 3–0 | 5–0 | UEFA Euro 2020 qualifying |
| 6 | 16 June 2021 | Krestovsky Stadium, Saint Petersburg, Russia | Finland | 1–0 | 1–0 | UEFA Euro 2020 |
| 7 | 21 March 2024 | VTB Arena, Moscow, Russia | Serbia | 3–0 | 4–0 | Friendly |
| 8 | 19 November 2024 | Volgograd Arena, Volgograd, Russia | Syria | 3–0 | 4–0 | Friendly |
| 9 | 7 September 2025 | Jassim bin Hamad Stadium, Al Rayyan, Qatar | Qatar | 4–1 | 4–1 | Friendly |
| 10 | 14 October 2025 | VTB Arena, Moscow, Russia | Bolivia | 2–0 | 3–0 | Friendly |
| 11 | 5 June 2026 | Volgograd Arena, Volgograd, Russia | Burkina Faso | 2–0 | 3–0 | Friendly |
| 12 | 6 October 2026 | Nizhny Novgorod Stadium, Nizhny Novgorod, Russia | Nigeria | 3–1 | 3–3 | Friendly |
| 13 | 12 November 2026 | Pakhtakor Central Stadium, Tashkent, Uzbekistan | Uzbekistan | 3–2 | 3–2 | Friendly |
| 14 | 17 November 2026 | Krasnodar Stadium, Krasnodar, Russia | Venezuela | 1–0 | 2–0 | Friendly |
| 15 | 17 November 2026 | Krasnodar Stadium, Krasnodar, Russia | Venezuela | 2–0 | 2–0 | Friendly |

== Honours ==
Lokomotiv Moscow

- Russian Premier League: 2017–18
- Russian Cup: 2014–15, 2016–17, 2018–19
- Russian Super Cup: 2019

Atalanta

- UEFA Europa League: 2023–24

Individual

- Best under-21 player of the Russian Football Premier League: 2013–14
