= Nikita Dorofeyev =

Russian football player

Personal information
- Full name: Nikita Sergeyevich Dorofeyev
- Date of birth: 15 February 1998 (age 28)
- Place of birth: Moscow, Russia
- Height: 1.80 m (5 ft 11 in)
- Position: Midfielder

Team information
- Current team: Dynamo Kirov
- Number: 89

Youth career
- –2018: Lokomotiv Moscow

Senior career*
Years	Team	Apps	(Gls)
2017–2019	Kazanka Moscow	51	(8)
2019–2020	Lokomotiv Moscow	0	(0)
2020–2021	Shinnik Yaroslavl	28	(1)
2022	Olimp-Dolgoprudny	7	(1)
2022	Sokol Saratov	6	(1)
2022–2023	Rodina-Media Moscow		
2023–2024	Metallurg Lipetsk	16	(1)
2024	Tver	9	(2)
2024–2026	Irtysh Omsk	61	(13)
2026–	Dynamo Kirov	14	(3)
- * Club domestic league appearances and goals as of 15 November 2026

Nikita Sergeyevich Dorofeyev (Russian: Никита Сергеевич Дорофеев; born 15 February 1998) is a Russian football player who plays for Dynamo Kirov. He mostly plays as a central midfielder, but can also appear on left or right midfield.

== Club career ==
He made his debut in the Russian Professional Football League for Lokomotiv-Kazanka Moscow on 19 July 2017 in a game against Znamya Truda Orekhovo-Zuyevo.

He made his debut for the senior squad of Lokomotiv Moscow on 25 September 2019 in a Russian Cup game against Baltika Kaliningrad. He was one of the two players to miss his shot in the penalty shootout that Lokomotiv lost.

He made his Russian Football National League debut for Shinnik Yaroslavl on 2 August 2020 in a game against Torpedo Moscow.
