= Sergey Lapochkin (referee, born 1981) =

Russian professional football referee

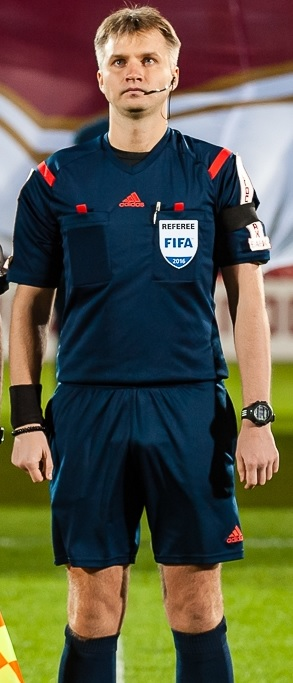
- Lapochkin in 2016
- Full name: Sergey Sergeyevich Lapochkin
- Born: 28 April 1981 (age 45); Leningrad, Russian SFSR

Domestic
Years	League	Role
2000–2010	Russian Second Division	Referee
2005–2013	Russian First Division	Referee
2011–2021	Russian Premier League	Referee

International
Years	League	Role
2013–2021	FIFA	Referee

Sergey Sergeyevich Lapochkin (Russian: Сергей Сергеевич Лапочкин; born 28 April 1981) is a Russian former professional football referee.

He has been a FIFA referee since 2013.

His father, also named Sergey Lapochkin also was a referee.

On 9 June 2021, it was announced that he is banned from any football activity for 10 years by UEFA. In July 2018 he was contacted by unidentified people who wanted him to influence the outcome of the Europa League qualifier between Ventspils and Bordeaux that he was refereeing, and he did not report this contact to UEFA.
