= 2013–14 FC Lokomotiv Moscow season =

Lokomotiv Moscow
RFPL 2013–14 season
- Chairman: Olga Smorodskaya
- Manager: Leonid Kuchuk
- Stadium: Lokomotiv Stadium (28,800 places)
- Russian Premier League: 3
- Russian Cup: Round of 32 vs Rotor Volgograd
- Top goalscorer: League: Dame N'Doye (13); All: Dame N'Doye (13)
- Highest home attendance: 28,000 vs Spartak Moscow (30 March 2014)
- Lowest home attendance: 7,146 vs Amkar Perm (21 October 2013)
- Average home league attendance: 12,831
Home colours	Away colours	Third colours

The 2013–14 season Lokomotiv Moscow's was 12th season in the Russian Premier League, and their 22nd consecutive season in the top-flight of the Russian football championship since the dissolution of the Soviet Union.

This is Leonid Kuchuk's first season in charge after taking over from Slaven Bilić, who was sacked at the end of the previous season following Lokomotiv's worst ever performance in the Russian Premier League since the dissolution of the Soviet Union. Indeed, Lokomotiv's poor performance last season has left the club without European football this season and therefore the only cup that Lokomotiv participates in is the Russian Cup.

== Squad and coaching staff information ==
=== First team squad ===
Players and squad numbers last updated on 18 February 2014.
Note: Flags indicate national team as has been defined under FIFA eligibility rules. Players may hold more than one non-FIFA nationality.

No.	Name	Nationality	Position(s)	Date of birth (age)	Signed from	Since
Goalkeepers
1	Guilherme (captain)	(Brazil)	GK	12 December 1985 (age 40)	Atlético Paranaense	2007
16	Aleksei Shirokov	(Russia)	GK	6 April 1989 (age 37)	Lokomotiv-2	2013
41	Miroslav Lobantsev	(Russia)	GK	27 May 1995 (age 31)	Youth system	2012
81	Ilya Abayev	(Russia)	GK	2 August 1981 (age 45)	Volga Nizhny Novgorod	2013
Defenders
14	Vedran Ćorluka	(Croatia)	DF	5 February 1986 (age 40)	Tottenham Hotspur	2012
28	Ján Ďurica	(Slovakia)	DF	10 December 1981 (age 44)	Saturn Moscow Oblast	2009
29	Vitaliy Denisov	(Uzbekistan)	DF	23 February 1987 (age 39)	Dnipro Dnipropetrovsk	2013
49	Roman Shishkin (1st vice-captain)	(Russia)	DF	27 January 1987 (age 39)	Spartak Moscow	2010
51	Maksim Belyayev	(Russia)	DF	30 September 1991 (age 35)	Youth system	2008
55	Renat Yanbayev	(Russia)	DF	7 April 1984 (age 42)	Kuban Krasnodar	2007
Midfielders
4	Alberto Zapater	(Spain)	MF	13 June 1985 (age 41)	Sporting CP	2011
6	Maksim Grigoryev	(Russia)	MF	6 July 1990 (age 36)	MITOS Novocherkassk	2012
8	Aleksandr Sheshukov	(Russia)	MF	15 April 1983 (age 43)	Rostov	2014
11	Mbark Boussoufa	(Morocco)	MF	15 August 1984 (age 42)	Anzhi Makhachkala	2013
17	Taras Mykhalyk	(Ukraine)	MF / DF	28 October 1983 (age 43)	Dynamo Kyiv	2013
19	Aleksandr Samedov	(Russia)	MF	19 July 1984 (age 42)	Dynamo Moscow	2012
23	Dmitri Tarasov (2nd vice-captain)	(Russia)	MF	18 March 1987 (age 39)	FC Moscow	2010
26	Yan Tigorev	(Belarus)	MF	10 March 1984 (age 42)	Tom Tomsk	2012
27	Magomed Ozdoyev	(Russia)	MF	5 November 1992 (age 34)	Dynamo Kyiv	2010
59	Aleksei Miranchuk	(Russia)	MF	17 October 1995 (age 31)	Youth system	2013
77	Sergei Tkachyov	(Russia)	MF	19 May 1989 (age 37)	Metalist Kharkiv	2013
85	Lassana Diarra	(France)	MF	10 March 1985 (age 41)	Anzhi Makhachkala	2013
Forwards
7	Maicon	(Brazil)	FW	18 February 1990 (age 36)	Fluminense	2010
9	Roman Pavlyuchenko	(Russia)	FW	15 December 1981 (age 44)	Tottenham Hotspur	2012
33	Dame N'Doye	(Senegal)	FW	21 February 1985 (age 41)	Copenhagen	2012

=== Youth squad ===
Statistics updated 14 May 2014

Note: Flags indicate national team as defined under FIFA eligibility rules; some limited exceptions apply. Players may hold more than one non-FIFA nationality.

No.	Pos.	Nation	Player
41	GK	RUS	Miroslav Lobantsev (17 games, 26 goals conceded)
97	GK	RUS	Yuri Kostrikov (13 games, 15 goals conceded)
16	GK	RUS	Aleksei Shirokov (2 games, 2 goals conceded)
91	GK	RUS	Aleksandr Vorobyov (1 game, 3 goals conceded)
79	DF	RUS	Vitali Lystsov (vice-captain; 21 games, 2 goals)
67	DF	RUS	Temur Mustafin (21 games)
34	DF	RUS	Mikhail Martynov (18 games)
40	DF	RUS	Daniil Chalov (14 games; left in February 2014)
31	DF	RUS	Aleksandr Dovbnya (13 games, 1 goal)
95	DF	RUS	Oleg Murachyov (13 games)
75	DF	RUS	Aleksandr Seraskhov (12 games)
71	DF	RUS	Aleksei Solovyov (9 games)
89	DF	RUS	Denis Baryshnikov (7 games; left to (Russia) Lokomotiv-2 in February 2014)
73	DF	RUS	Dzhamshed Rakhmonov (6 games)
43	DF	RUS	Andrei Chernetsov (6 games)
83	DF	RUS	Viktor Fereferov (2 games)
46	DF	RUS	Artyom Vyatkin (1 game; left to (Russia) Lokomotiv-2 in February 2014)

No.	Pos.	Nation	Player
90	MF	RUS	Aleksandr Lomakin (captain; 30 games, 17 goals)
60	MF	RUS	Anton Miranchuk (23 games, 2 goals)
52	MF	RUS	Sergei Makarov (19 games, 1 goal)
80	MF	RUS	Nasyr Abilayev (12 games, 1 goal; left in February 2014)
36	MF	RUS	Dmitri Barinov (9 games)
38	MF	RUS	Nikita Salamatov (vice-captain; 6 games, 1 goal)
69	MF	RUS	Vladislav Semyonov (5 games)
59	MF	RUS	Aleksei Miranchuk (1 game)
82	MF	RUS	Georgi Makhatadze (1 game)
30	FW	RUS	Arshak Koryan (26 games, 12 goals)
37	FW	RUS	Andrea Chukanov (26 games, 6 goals)
92	FW	RUS	Aleksei Turik (25 games, 1 goal)
72	FW	RUS	Kamil Mullin (19 games, 5 goals; left to (Russia) Rubin in January 2014)
39	FW	RUS	Denis Anisimov (12 games, 4 goals)
44	FW	AZE	Samir Masimov (11 games; left to (Azerbaijan) Neftchi in January 2014)
86	FW	RUS	Mikhail Pogonin (9 games, 1 goal)
66	FW	RUS	Akhmed Pugiyev (8 games, 1 goal; left to (Russia) Lokomotiv-2 in February 2014)
32	FW	RUS	Rifat Zhemaletdinov (6 games)
62	FW	RUS	Yevgeni Voronin (5 games)
87	FW	RUS	Nikolai Kipiani (4 games)

=== Non-playing staff ===
Coaches and respective roles last updated on 27 July 2013.

Position	Staff
Manager	(Belarus) Leonid Kuchuk
Coach	(Belarus) Andrei Sosnitskiy
Coach	(Ukraine) Yuriy Kulish
Coach	(Tajikistan) (Russia) Igor Cherevchenko
Goalkeeper Coach	(Moldova) Evgeniy Ivanov
Coach Analyst	(Belarus) Sergey Kabelskiy
Fitness Coach	(Belarus) Vitaliy Milyutin
Fitness Coach	(Russia) Mariya Burova
Fitness Coach	(Russia) Artur Saveliev
Youth Coach	(Russia) Denis Klyuyev
Team Manager	(Russia) Vyacheslav Chekmarev
Doctor	(Russia) Andrey Agapov
Doctor	(Russia) Saveliy Myshalov
Doctor	(Russia) Sergey Haykin
Masseur	(Russia) Alexander Gasov
Masseur	(Russia) Vladimir Tkachenko
Masseur	(Russia) Sergey Semakin
Administrator	(Russia) Anatoliy Mashkov
Administrator	(Russia) Sergey Grishin
Administrator	(Russia) Ruslan Elderkhanov
Translator	(Russia) Stepan Levin
Translator	(Russia) Dmitriy Kraitov

== Transfers and loans ==
In: Summer transfer window 2013
Note: Flags indicate national team as defined under FIFA eligibility rules; some limited exceptions apply. Players may hold more than one non-FIFA nationality.

No.	Pos.	Nation	Player
24	DF	RUS	Andrei Ivanov (end of loan to (Russia) Rostov)
51	DF	RUS	Maksim Belyayev (end of loan to (Russia) Rostov)
81	GK	RUS	Ilya Abayev (from (Russia) Volga NN)
17	DF	UKR	Taras Mykhalyk (from (Ukraine) Dynamo Kyiv)
—	DF	RUS	Arseniy Logashov (from (Russia) Anzhi)
11	MF	MAR	Mbark Boussoufa (from (Russia) Anzhi)
77	MF	RUS	Sergei Tkachyov (from (Ukraine) Metalist Kharkiv)
85	MF	FRA	Lassana Diarra (from (Russia) Anzhi)

In: Winter transfer window 2014
Note: Flags indicate national team as defined under FIFA eligibility rules; some limited exceptions apply. Players may hold more than one non-FIFA nationality.

No.	Pos.	Nation	Player
8	MF	RUS	Aleksandr Sheshukov (from (Russia) Rostov)

Out: Summer transfer window 2013
Note: Flags indicate national team as defined under FIFA eligibility rules; some limited exceptions apply. Players may hold more than one non-FIFA nationality.

No.	Pos.	Nation	Player
—	GK	BLR	Anton Amelchenko (to (Russia) Rostov, previously on loan at (Russia) Terek Grozny)
—	GK	RUS	Aleksandr Filtsov (to (Russia) Krasnodar, previously on loan)
—	DF	POR	Manuel da Costa (to (Turkey) Sivasspor, previously on loan to (Portugal) Nacional)
—	DF	RUS	Igor Golban (on loan to (Russia) Shinnik, previously on loan to (Czech Republic) Sigma Olomouc)
—	DF	RUS	Arseniy Logashov (on loan to (Russia) Rostov)
—	DF	RUS	Sandro Tsveiba (to (Russia) Rus St. Petersburg)
—	DF	RUS	Aleksandr Yarkovoy (to (Russia) Khimki)
—	MF	RUS	Alan Chochiyev (on loan to (Russia) Lokomotiv-2, previously on loan to (Russia) Volgar)
—	MF	RUS	Nikita Dubchak (to (Russia) Lokomotiv-2)
—	MF	RUS	Semyon Fomin (to (Russia) Rotor, previously on loan)
—	MF	RUS	Denis Glushakov (to (Russia) Spartak M)
—	MF	BIH	Senijad Ibričić (to (Turkey) Kayseri Erciyesspor, previously on loan to (Turkey) Kasımpaşa)
—	MF	RUS	Dmitri Loskov (contract expired)
—	MF	RUS	Dmitry Mikhaylenko (to (Russia) Volga NN)
—	MF	RUS	Vyacheslav Podberyozkin (on loan to (Russia) Lokomotiv-2)
—	MF	RUS	Dmitri Torbinski (to (Russia) Rubin)
—	MF	RUS	Aleksandr Zakuskin (to (Russia) Lokomotiv-2)
—	FW	ARM	Artur Sarkisov (to (Russia) Ural, previously on loan at (Russia) Volga NN)
—	FW	RUS	Dmitri Sychev (on loan to (Russia) Volga NN, previously on loan to (Belarus) Dinamo Minsk)

Out: Winter transfer window 2014
Note: Flags indicate national team as defined under FIFA eligibility rules; some limited exceptions apply. Players may hold more than one non-FIFA nationality.

No.	Pos.	Nation	Player
22	GK	CRO	Dario Krešić (to (Germany) Mainz 05)
5	DF	RUS	Taras Burlak (to (Russia) Rubin)
24	DF	RUS	Andrei Ivanov (contract terminated)
40	DF	RUS	Daniil Chalov (contract terminated)
46	DF	RUS	Artyom Vyatkin (to (Russia) Lokomotiv-2)
89	DF	RUS	Denis Baryshnikov (to (Russia) Lokomotiv-2)
—	DF	RUS	Igor Golban (on loan to (Russia) Khimki)
80	MF	RUS	Nasyr Abilayev (contract terminated)
—	MF	RUS	Alan Chochiyev (to (Russia) Krylia Sovetov)
—	MF	RUS	Vyacheslav Podberyozkin (on loan to (Russia) Khimki)
13	FW	NGR	Victor Obinna (on loan to (Italy) Chievo Verona)
25	FW	ECU	Felipe Caicedo (to (United Arab Emirates) Al Jazira)
66	FW	RUS	Akhmed Pugiyev (to (Russia) Lokomotiv-2)
72	FW	RUS	Kamil Mullin (to (Russia) Rubin)

== Pre-season and mid-season ==
Lokomotiv's players who were not on duty with their respective national teams called for pre-season medical examinations on Friday 14 June 2013. The others undertook their medical examinations the week after and by 22 June all the players had passed their medical examinations.

On 24 June 2013, the squad, under the guidance of Leonid Kuchuk, flew to Slovenia for the annual pre-season training camp and played a series of friendlies with various clubs.

=== Pre-season friendlies ===
27 June 2013	Lokomotiv Moscow	1–0	Partizan	Ptuj
	Maicon 26'			Stadium: Mestni stadion Ptuj

30 June 2013	Lokomotiv Moscow	0–2	Maribor	Maribor
			Tavares 28'; Bohar 41'	Stadium: Ljudski vrt

5 July 2013	Lokomotiv Moscow	1–2	Lokomotiva	Ptuj
	Grigoryev 85'		Mišić 22'; Šitum 64' (pen.)	Stadium: Mestni stadion Ptuj

6 July 2013	Lokomotiv Moscow	4–1	Metalist Kharkiv	Dravograd
	N'Doye 27'; Samedov 54'; Pavlyuchenko 71', 89'		Willian 69'	Stadium: Dravograd Sports Centre

One-month vacations after first half of the season ended on 9 January 2014. Players passed medicals and the next day flew to their first winter camp in Portugal. After two weeks of work and two friendlies the team returned to Moscow. The second winter camp, featuring three friendlies, started in Spain on 27 January, and the third camp with five control matches – also in Spain, from 14 February.

=== Mid-season friendlies ===
16 January 2014	Lokomotiv Moscow	5–0	Esperança Lagos	Lagos
	Grigoryev 24'; Boussoufa 51'; Koryan 56', 75'; Pavlyuchenko 70'	Protocol

22 January 2014	Lokomotiv Moscow	1–0	Olhanense	Lagos
	N'Doye 33'	Protocol

31 January 2014	Lokomotiv Moscow	3–1	Lech Poznań	Chiclana de la Frontera
	Pavlyuchenko 28'; Koryan 32'; Boussoufa 33'	Protocol	Możdżeń 38'

4 February 2014	Lokomotiv Moscow	1–2	Sparta Prague	Chiclana de la Frontera
	Tkachyov 85'	Protocol	Lafata 13' (pen.); Krejčí 77'

8 February 2014	Lokomotiv Moscow	1–2	Ludogorets Razgrad	Chiclana de la Frontera
	Tkachyov 70'	Protocol	Abalo 11'; Bezjak 90'

19 February 2014	Lokomotiv Moscow	2–0	Málaga B	Estepona
	Al. Miranchuk 15'; Grigoryev 52'	Protocol

19 February 2014	Lokomotiv Moscow	4–0	Djurgården	Marbella
	Samedov 4'; Tkachyov 58'; Pavlyuchenko 62'; Ďurica 65'	Protocol

23 February 2014	Lokomotiv Moscow	15–0	Strømsgodset B	Estepona
	Pavlyuchenko 6', 28', 35'; Samedov 16' (pen.); Boussoufa 25'; N'Doye 50', 57', 66', 72', 84'; Grigoryev 62' (pen.), 74', 78', 80'; Al. Miranchuk 82'	Protocol

27 February 2014	Lokomotiv Moscow	3–1	Real Linense	Estepona
	Grigoryev 24', 66'; Seraskhov 87'	Protocol	Blaz 41'

27 February 2014	Lokomotiv Moscow	1–0	Molde	Marbella
	Samedov 10' (pen.)	Protocol

== Competitions ==
=== Russian Premier League ===
==== Results by matchday ====
Round	1	2	3	4	5	6	7	8	9	10	11	12	13	14	15	16	17	18	19	20	21	22	23	24	25	26	27	28	29	30
Ground	A	A	H	H	A	H	A	H	A	A	H	A	H	A	A	A	H	A	H	H	A	H	H	H	H	H	A	H	A	A
Result	D	W	L	W	W	W	L	W	W	W	D	D	W	W	W	L	W	W	D	W	D	W	D	W	D	W	W	D	L	L
Position	6	3	6	4	5	2	5	4	4	3	2	2	2	2	2	2	2	1	2	1	1	1	1	1	2	2	2	2	3	3

Updated to match(es) played on 15 May 2014. Source: Matches
A = Away; H = Home; W = Win; D = Draw; L = Loss

==== Results ====
14 July 2013 1	Anzhi Makhachkala	2–2	Lokomotiv Moscow	Kaspiysk
18:30 MSK (UTC+4)	Eto'o 79'; Traoré 83'	Report	62' N'Doye; 89' Pavlyuchenko	Stadium: Anzhi-Arena; Attendance: 25,000; Referee: Vladislav Bezborodov

20 July 2013 2	Volga Nizhny Novgorod	1–2	Lokomotiv Moscow	Nizhny Novgorod
18:30 MSK (UTC+4)	Mukendi 67'	Report	63' Maicon; 87' Shishkin	Stadium: Lokomotiv Stadium; Attendance: 11,500; Referee: Aleksandr Yegorov

28 July 2013 3	Lokomotiv Moscow	1–2	CSKA Moscow	Moscow
13:30 MSK (UTC+3)	Tarasov 75'	Report	18' Honda; 82' Musa	Stadium: Lokomotiv Stadium; Attendance: 19,821; Referee: Aleksei Nikolaev

5 August 2013 4	Lokomotiv Moscow	3–1	Krasnodar	Moscow
21:15 MSK (UTC+3)	Denisov 41'; N'Doye 83'; Ďurica 88'	Report	(red card) 44' Jędrzejczyk; 59' (pen.) Joãozinho	Stadium: Lokomotiv Stadium; Attendance: 8,463; Referee: Sergey Karasev

17 August 2013 5	Terek Grozny	0–1	Lokomotiv Moscow	Grozny
20:30 MSK (UTC+3)		Report	90+2' Samedov	Stadium: Akhmat-Arena; Attendance: 18,972; Referee: Sergey Kuznetsov

26 August 2013 6	Lokomotiv Moscow	5–0	Rostov	Moscow
20:00 MSK (UTC+4)	Caicedo 44'; Samedov 53' (pen.); Maicon 57'; Tarasov 62'; Pavlyuchenko 83'	Report	(red card) 52' Agalarov; (yellow card) 59' (yellow-red card) Lolo	Stadium: Lokomotiv Stadium; Attendance: 10,460; Referee: Igor Nizovtsev

1 September 2013 7	Zenit Saint Petersburg	2–1	Lokomotiv Moscow	Saint Petersburg
13:30 MSK (UTC+4)	Shirokov 43' (pen.); Zyryanov 86'	Report	(red card) 42' Diarra; 70' (pen.) Boussoufa	Stadium: Petrovsky Stadium; Attendance: 19,029; Referee: Sergei Ivanov

15 September 2013 8	Lokomotiv Moscow	1–0	Kuban Krasnodar	Moscow
13:30 MSK (UTC+4)	Tarasov 49'	Report		Stadium: Lokomotiv Stadium; Attendance: 9,475; Referee: Alexey Yeskov

21 September 2013 9	Dynamo Moscow	1–3	Lokomotiv Moscow	Khimki
13:30 MSK (UTC+4)	Noboa 58'; Douglas (red card) 73'	Report	51' N'Doye; 74' (pen.) Samedov; 90+3' Tkachyov	Stadium: Arena Khimki; Attendance: 9,279; Referee: Sergey Karasev

25 September 2013 10	Ural Sverdlovsk Oblast	0–3	Lokomotiv Moscow	Yekaterinburg
18:15 MSK (UTC+4)	Vještica (red card) 12'	Report	5' N'Doye; 26' Tarasov; 90+1' Diarra	Stadium: Central Stadium; Attendance: 11,240; Referee: Mikhail Vilkov

30 September 2013 11	Lokomotiv Moscow	0–0	Tom Tomsk	Moscow
18:15 MSK (UTC+4)	Diarra (yellow card) 90+1' (yellow-red card)	Report	(yellow card) 82' (yellow-red card) Bardachow	Stadium: Lokomotiv Stadium; Attendance: 8,460; Referee: Sergey Kuznetsov

5 October 2013 12	Krylya Sovetov Samara	2–2	Lokomotiv Moscow	Samara
16:00 MSK (UTC+4)	Kornilenko 18', 39' (pen.)	Report	47' N'Doye; 64' (yellow card) 90+2' (yellow-red card) Mykhalyk	Stadium: Metallurg Stadium; Attendance: 10,456; Referee: Sergey Lapochkin

21 October 2013 13	Lokomotiv Moscow	4–0	Amkar Perm	Moscow
19:00 MSK (UTC+4)	N'Doye 7'; Maicon 39'; Shishkin 57'; Pavlyuchenko 86'	Report		Stadium: Lokomotiv Stadium; Attendance: 7,146; Referee: Aleksandr Yegorov

27 October 2013 14	Rubin Kazan	1–2	Lokomotiv Moscow	Kazan
13:30 MSK (UTC+4)	Ryazantsev 60'	Report	52' Pavlyuchenko; 84' N'Doye	Stadium: Central Stadium (Kazan); Attendance: 6,742; Referee: Sergei Ivanov

3 November 2013 15	Spartak Moscow	1–3	Lokomotiv Moscow	Moscow
18:00 MSK (UTC+4)	Movsisyan 27'	Report	7', 77' N'Doye; 17' Samedov	Stadium: Lokomotiv Stadium; Attendance: 0 (Spartak was adjudged for 2 matches at closed doors by decision of RFU Control-Disciplinary Body after disorders at the stands and use of Nazist symbols by Spartak fans during Russian Cup game vs Shinnik on 30 October 2013); Referee: Aleksei Nikolaev

9 November 2013 16	Tom Tomsk	2–0	Lokomotiv Moscow	Tomsk
13:30 MSK (UTC+4)	Bashkirov 4'; Ignatovich 39' (pen.)	Report	(yellow card) 30' (yellow-red card) 44' Tarasov	Stadium: Trud Stadium; Attendance: 4,600; Referee: Vasili Kazartsev

24 November 2013 17	Lokomotiv Moscow	1–0	Dynamo Moscow	Moscow
13:30 MSK (UTC+3)	N'Doye 65'	Report		Stadium: Lokomotiv Stadium; Attendance: 14,190; Referee: Alexey Yeskov

2 December 2013 18	Kuban Krasnodar	1–3	Lokomotiv Moscow	Krasnodar
19:30 MSK (UTC+3)	Cissé 90+1'	Report	5' Maicon; 14' Ćorluka; 31' Boussoufa	Stadium: Kuban Stadium; Attendance: 6,812; Referee: Aleksandr Yegorov

7 December 2013 19	Lokomotiv Moscow	0–0	Rubin Kazan	Moscow
18:30 MSK (UTC+3)	Diarra (yellow card) 90+1' (yellow-red card)	Report		Stadium: Lokomotiv Stadium; Attendance: 10,075; Referee: Sergey Karasev

10 March 2014 20	Lokomotiv Moscow	2–1	Krylya Sovetov Samara	Moscow
16:30 MSK (UTC+3)	N'Doye 18'; Ozdoyev 77'	Report	87' Drahun	Stadium: Lokomotiv Stadium; Attendance: 12,130; Referee: Mikhail Vilkov

16 March 2014 21	Amkar Perm	0–0	Lokomotiv Moscow	Perm
13:30 MSK (UTC+3)		Report		Stadium: Zvezda Stadium; Attendance: 11,800; Referee: Vladislav Bezborodov

22 March 2014 22	Lokomotiv Moscow	3–0	Ural Sverdlovsk Oblast	Moscow
16:30 MSK (UTC+3)	Belozyorov (og) 13'; N'Doye 14'; Tkachyov 76'	Report		Stadium: Lokomotiv Stadium; Attendance: 9,508; Referee: Aleksandr Yegorov

30 March 2013 23	Lokomotiv Moscow	0–0	Spartak Moscow	Moscow
13:30 MSK (UTC+3)		Report		Stadium: Lokomotiv Stadium; Attendance: 28,000; Referee: Mikhail Vilkov

7 April 2014 24	Lokomotiv Moscow	3–0	Volga Nizhny Novgorod	Moscow
19:00 MSK (UTC+3)	Samedov 32' (pen.); Maicon 46'; N'Doye 71'	Report	(red card) 24' Polczak	Stadium: Lokomotiv Stadium; Attendance: 8,110; Referee: Vladislav Bezborodov

13 April 2014 25	Lokomotiv Moscow	0–0	Anzhi Makhachkala	Moscow
13:30 MSK (UTC+3)		Report		Stadium: Lokomotiv Stadium; Attendance: 11,499; Referee: Aleksandr Yegorov

19 April 2014 26	Lokomotiv Moscow	2–1	Terek Grozny	Moscow
15:30 MSK (UTC+3)	Pavlyuchenko 71', 79'	Report	30' Aílton	Stadium: Lokomotiv Stadium; Attendance: 8,625; Referee: Sergey Lapochkin

26 April 2014 27	Krasnodar	1–3	Lokomotiv Moscow	Krasnodar
19:00 MSK (UTC+3)	Joãozinho 45'	Report	6' Al. Miranchuk; 90+2', 90+5' Samedov	Stadium: Kuban Stadium; Attendance: 13,600; Referee: Sergei Ivanov

4 May 2014 28	Lokomotiv Moscow	1–1	Zenit Saint Petersburg	Moscow
13:30 MSK (UTC+3)	Tkachyov 76'	Report	35' Rondón	Stadium: Lokomotiv Stadium; Attendance: 26,500; Referee: Aleksandr Yegorov (injured; from 67th min. Igor Nizovtsev)

11 May 2014 29	Rostov	2–0	Lokomotiv Moscow	Rostov-on-Don
20:15 MSK (UTC+3)	Dyakov 18'; Kalachev 68'	Report		Stadium: Olimp-2; Attendance: 14,200; Referee: Mikhail Vilkov

15 May 2014 30	CSKA Moscow	1–0	Lokomotiv Moscow	Khimki
18:30 MSK (UTC+3)	Tošić 46'	Report		Stadium: Arena Khimki; Attendance: 18,100; Referee: Aleksei Nikolaev

==== Table ====
Pos	Team	Pld	W	D	L	GF	GA	GD	Pts	Qualification or relegation
1	CSKA Moscow (C)	30	20	4	6	49	26	+23	64	Qualification for the Champions League group stage
2	Zenit St. Petersburg	30	19	6	5	63	32	+31	63	Qualification for the Champions League third qualifying round
3	Lokomotiv Moscow	30	17	8	5	51	23	+28	59	Qualification for the Europa League play-off round
4	Dynamo Moscow	30	15	7	8	54	37	+17	52	Qualification for the Europa League third qualifying round
5	Krasnodar	30	15	5	10	46	39	+7	50 (Note: Krasnodar ahead of Spartak Moscow on head-to-head points; Krasnodar–Spartak Moscow 4–0, Spartak Moscow–Krasnodar 3–2.)	Qualification for the Europa League second qualifying round

Source: Russian Premier League
Rules for classification: 1) points; 2) number of wins; 3) head-to-head points; 4) number of head-to-head wins; 5) head-to-head goal difference; 6) number of head-to-head goals scored; 7) number of head-to-head away goals scored; 8) goal difference; 9) number of goals scored; 10) number of away goals scored; 11) position in the 2012–13 season (only used until all the regularly scheduled games have been played); 11) extra play-off game or tournament between the teams in question.
(C) Champions

=== Russian Cup ===
30 October 2013 Round of 32	Rotor Volgograd	0–0 (a.e.t.) (4–3 p)	Lokomotiv Moscow	Volgograd
19:00 MSK (UTC+4)		Summary		Stadium: Tsentralniy; Attendance: 13,500; Referee: Kirill Levnikov (St. Petersburg)
	Penalties
	Stavpets (penalty scored); Voydel (penalty missed); Kabutov (penalty scored); Ten (penalty scored); Malygin (penalty scored)		(penalty missed) Caicedo; (penalty scored) Pavlyuchenko; (penalty missed) Ozdoyev; (penalty scored) Burlak; (penalty scored) Shishkin

=== Youth squads tournament ===
==== Results by matchday ====
Round	1	2	3	4	5	6	7	8	9	10	11	12	13	14	15	16	17	18	19	20	21	22	23	24	25	26	27	28	29	30
Ground	A	A	H	H	A	H	A	H	A	A	H	A	H	A	A	A	H	A	H	H	A	H	H	H	H	H	A	H	A	A
Result	W	W	L	W	W	W	L	D	L	W	W	L	W	W	L	D	W	L	W	W	L	W	D	L	L	W	L	W	L	L
Position	5	2	6	9	7	5	5	4	7	6	4	6	4	4	4	5	4	5	4	3	4	3	3	3	4	3	5	5	5	6

Updated to match(es) played on 15 May 2014. Source: Matches
A = Away; H = Home; W = Win; D = Draw; L = Loss

== Squad statistics ==
Last update 16 May 2014

No.	Pos.	Player	Russian Premier League					Russian Cup					Total				
No.	Pos.	Player	GS	App.	Goal	Yellow card	Red card	GS	App.	Goal	Yellow card	Red card	GS	App.	Goal	Yellow card	Red card
Goalkeepers
81	GK	(Russia) Ilya Abayev	24	24	−16	1	-	-	-	-	-	-	24	24	−16	1	-
1	GK	(Brazil) Guilherme	6	6	−6	1	-	-	-	-	-	-	6	6	−6	1	-
41	GK	(Russia) Miroslav Lobantsev	-	-	-	-	-	-	-	-	-	-	-	-	-	-	-
Defenders
28	DF	(Slovakia) Ján Ďurica	30	30	1	1	-	-	-	-	-	-	30	30	1	1	-
14	DF	(Croatia) Vedran Ćorluka	28	28	1	10	-	-	-	-	-	-	28	28	1	10	-
49	DF	(Russia) Roman Shishkin	23	24	2	2	-	1	1	-	-	-	24	25	2	2	-
29	DF	(Uzbekistan) Vitaliy Denisov	23	24	1	3	-	-	1	-	1	-	23	25	1	4	-
55	DF	(Russia) Renat Yanbayev	18	19	-	2	-	1	1	-	-	-	19	20	-	2	-
Midfielders
19	MF	(Russia) Aleksandr Samedov	29	30	7	2	-	-	-	-	-	-	29	30	7	2	-
11	MF	(Morocco) Mbark Boussoufa	17	21	2	9	-	-	-	-	-	-	17	21	2	9	-
23	MF	(Russia) Dmitri Tarasov (injured since Feb 2014)	17	17	4	5	1	-	-	-	-	-	17	17	4	5	1
85	MF	(France) Lassana Diarra	13	17	1	2	3	-	-	-	-	-	13	17	1	2	3
17	MF	(Ukraine) Taras Mykhalyk	9	12	1	1	1	1	1	-	-	-	10	13	1	1	1
77	MF	(Russia) Sergei Tkachyov	9	19	3	-	-	-	-	-	-	-	9	19	3	-	-
8	MF	(Russia) Aleksandr Sheshukov	9	9	-	1	-	-	-	-	-	-	9	9	-	1	-
26	MF	(Belarus) Yan Tigorev	6	12	-	3	-	1	1	-	-	-	7	13	-	3	-
27	MF	(Russia) Magomed Ozdoyev	5	13	1	-	-	1	1	-	-	-	6	14	1	-	-
59	MF	(Russia) Aleksei Miranchuk	5	8	1	-	-	1	1	-	-	-	6	9	1	-	-
6	MF	(Russia) Maksim Grigoryev	4	10	-	-	-	1	1	-	-	-	5	11	-	-	-
4	MF	(Spain) Alberto Zapater	1	1	-	-	-	-	-	-	-	-	1	1	-	-	-
60	MF	(Russia) Anton Miranchuk	-	-	-	-	-	-	1	-	1	-	-	1	-	1	-
Forwards
33	FW	(Senegal) Dame N'Doye	21	27	13	4	-	-	-	-	-	-	21	27	13	4	-
7	FW	(Brazil) Maicon (injured since Apr 2014)	20	24	5	3	-	-	-	-	-	-	20	24	5	3	-
9	FW	(Russia) Roman Pavlyuchenko	7	24	6	3	-	-	1	-	-	-	7	25	6	3	-
Players who appeared for Lokomotiv no longer at the club:
22	GK	(Croatia) Dario Krešić	-	1	−1	-	-	1	1	-	-	-	1	2	−1	-	-
5	DF	(Russia) Taras Burlak	1	1	-	-	-	1	1	-	-	-	2	2	-	-	-
25	FW	(Ecuador) Felipe Caicedo	3	13	1	-	-	1	1	-	-	-	4	14	1	-	-
13	FW	(Nigeria) Victor Obinna	2	3	-	-	-	1	1	-	1	-	3	4	-	1	-

== Lokomotiv players at 2014 FIFA World Cup ==
#	Player	Country	Squad no.	Date	Stage	Opponent	Position	Minutes	Goal	Yellow card	Red card	Result
1	Vedran Ćorluka	Croatia	5	12 June 2014	Group A	Brazil	Centre-back	1–90	0	1	0	1–3
1	Vedran Ćorluka	Croatia	5	18 June 2014	Group A	Cameroon	Centre-back	1–90	0	0	0	4–0
1	Vedran Ćorluka	Croatia	5	23 June 2014	Group A	Mexico	Centre-back	1–90	0	0	0	1–3
1	Vedran Ćorluka	Croatia	5	Total	3 matches			270	0	1	0	
2	Aleksandr Samedov	Russia	19	17 June 2014	Group H	South Korea	Right midfielder	1–90	0	0	0	1–1
2	Aleksandr Samedov	Russia	19	22 June 2014	Group H	Belgium	Right midfielder	1–89	0	0	0	0–1
2	Aleksandr Samedov	Russia	19	26 June 2014	Group H	Algeria	Right midfielder	1–90	0	0	0	1–1
2	Aleksandr Samedov	Russia	19	Total	3 matches			269	0	0	0	

== Lokomotiv players in Russian national teams ==
=== Russia first team ===
Defender Maksim Belyayev,
midfielders Aleksei Miranchuk, Aleksandr Samedov, Dmitri Tarasov, Maksim Grigoryev.

=== Student team ===
Midfielder Alan Chochiyev.

=== Youth team U-21 ===
Goalkeeper Miroslav Lobantsev,
midfielder Aleksei Miranchuk.

=== 1995 U-19 ===
Goalkeeper Miroslav Lobantsev,
defenders Vitali Lystsov, Oleg Murachyov, Temur Mustafin,
midfielders Dmitri Barinov, Andrei Chernetsov, Aleksandr Lomakin, Anton Miranchuk,
forwards Arshak Koryan, Aleksei Turik, Andrea Chukanov.

=== 1996 U-17/U-18 ===
Midfielders Dmitri Barinov, Sergei Makarov,
forwards Denis Anisimov, Rifat Zhemaletdinov.

=== 1997 U-17 ===
Goalkeeper Ilya Ishchenko,
defender Dzhamshed Rakhmonov,
midfielders Nikolai Kipiani, Sergei Serchenkov, Georgi Makhatadze,
forward Timur Koblov.

=== 1998 U-16 ===
Goalkeeper Ilya Gnezdilov,
defenders Aleksandr Razoryonov, Viktor Fereferov, Yevgeni Fetisov,
midfielders Ivan Galanin, Georgi Makhatadze,
forwards Artyom Galadzhan, Mikhail Lysov.

=== 1999 U-15 ===
Midfielder Maksim Kalachevski.

== Season events ==
=== Manager of the Month ===
In August 2013, after winning all 3 games of the month (Krasnodar and Rostov at home, Terek away), Leonid Kuchuk was awarded monthly prize for Manager of the Month by Russian Football Union.

=== Manager of the Year ===
In December 2013, after guiding Lokomotiv to the joint leadership in Premier League before winter break, Leonid Kuchuk was named Manager of the Year by Football Federation of Belarus.

=== Player of the Month ===
In the 2013–14 season, the club continued a monthly poll among Loko fans in the social networks to name the best player of the month. The award went to:
Guilherme (July 2013),
Vitaliy Denisov (August 2013 and May 2014),
Dmitri Tarasov (September 2013),
Dame N'Doye (October 2013),
Lassana Diarra (November 2013 and December 2013),
Vedran Ćorluka (March 2014),
Aleksandr Samedov (April 2014).

=== Player of the Season ===
After the end of 2013–14 season, the club organized a new poll among Loko fans in the social networks to name the best player of the season. The award went to Aleksandr Samedov (32.3 percent of votes), Vedran Ćorluka (21.1) came second, and Vitaliy Denisov (12.5) third.

=== Player of the Year ===
In December 2013, Vitaliy Denisov was named Uzbekistani Player of the Year.

=== Miscellaneous ===
- Second goal by Dame N'Doye scored 3 November 2013 vs Spartak Moscow became 1000th Lokomotiv's goal in Russian top division since 1992.
- After victory over Kuban Krasnodar on 2 December 2013, Lokomotiv became leader of Premier League for the first time in more than seven years; last time the team led the League in October 2006 after 22 matchdays under guidance of Slavoljub Muslin.
- Ján Ďurica played all 30 league matches and did not miss a single minute. He became the first outfield player to achieve such mark for Lokomotiv during the Russian Premier League time (since 2001) and the third one among all Lokomotiv players after goalkeepers Sergei Ovchinnikov in 2002 and Guilherme in 2010.
