= 2014–15 FC Lokomotiv Moscow season =

FC Lokomotiv Moscow
2014–15 season
- Chairman: Olga Smorodskaya
- Manager: Leonid Kuchuk (until 17 September 2014); Igor Cherevchenko; Interim Manager (18 September – 4 October 2014); Miodrag Božović (4 October 2014 – 11 May 2015); Igor Cherevchenko; Interim Manager (since 12 May 2015)
- Stadium: Lokomotiv Stadium
- Russian Premier League: 7th
- Russian Cup: Winners
- Europa League: Play-off round vs Apollon Limassol
- Top goalscorer: League: Manuel Fernandes (7); All: Manuel Fernandes (7)
- Highest home attendance: 14,870 vs CSKA, League, 10 May 2015
- Lowest home attendance: 3,120 vs Ural, League, 3 December 2014
- Average home league attendance: 8,652
Home colours	Away colours	Third colours

The 2014–15 FC Lokomotiv Moscow season was the club's 23rd season in the Russian Premier League, the highest tier of association football in Russia. Lokomotiv Moscow also takes part in the Russian Cup and the Europa League.

== Season review ==
On 17 September 2014, Leonid Kuchuk resigned from the manager post after deterioration of his relationships with players. The next day Igor Cherevchenko was appointed as the club's caretaker manager. On 4 October 2014, Miodrag Božović was appointed as a new caretaker manager until conditions of Kuchuk's deal termination are worked out. On 10 October 2014, Božović signed a permanent deal as a manager, but resigned on 11 May 2015 with Igor Cherevchenko again taking control of Lokomotiv as caretaker manager.
Despite poor performances in the league, Lokomotiv won the Russian Cup, overtaking Kuban Krasnodar 3–1 after extra time and booking place in next season's Europa League.

== Squad ==
Note: Flags indicate national team as defined under FIFA eligibility rules; some limited exceptions apply. Players may hold more than one non-FIFA nationality.

No.	Pos.	Nation	Player
1	GK	BRA	Guilherme (captain)
3	MF	RUS	Alan Kasaev
4	MF	POR	Manuel Fernandes
5	DF	SRB	Nemanja Pejčinović
7	MF	BRA	Maicon
8	MF	RUS	Aleksandr Sheshukov
9	FW	RUS	Roman Pavlyuchenko
11	MF	MAR	Mbark Boussoufa
14	DF	CRO	Vedran Ćorluka
15	DF	RUS	Arseniy Logashov
16	GK	RUS	Ilya Lantratov
17	MF	UKR	Taras Mykhalyk
19	MF	RUS	Aleksandr Samedov (vice-captain)
21	MF	SEN	Oumar Niasse

No.	Pos.	Nation	Player
22	DF	RUS	Maksim Belyayev
23	MF	RUS	Dmitri Tarasov (vice-captain)
25	FW	SRB	Petar Škuletić
26	MF	BLR	Yan Tsiharow
28	DF	SVK	Ján Ďurica
29	DF	UZB	Vitaliy Denisov
41	GK	RUS	Miroslav Lobantsev
49	DF	RUS	Roman Shishkin (vice-captain)
55	DF	RUS	Renat Yanbayev
59	MF	RUS	Aleksei Miranchuk
60	MF	RUS	Anton Miranchuk
81	GK	RUS	Ilya Abayev
—	MF	ESP	Alberto Zapater
—	FW	NGR	Victor Obinna

=== Out on loan ===
Note: Flags indicate national team as defined under FIFA eligibility rules; some limited exceptions apply. Players may hold more than one non-FIFA nationality.

No.	Pos.	Nation	Player
6	MF	RUS	Maksim Grigoryev (at Rostov)
27	MF	RUS	Magomed Ozdoyev (at Rubin)
77	MF	RUS	Sergei Tkachyov (at Kuban)
—	FW	RUS	Dmitri Sychev (at Okzhetpes)

=== Youth squad ===
Note: Flags indicate national team as defined under FIFA eligibility rules; some limited exceptions apply. Players may hold more than one non-FIFA nationality.

No.	Pos.	Nation	Player
31	DF	RUS	Aleksandr Dovbnya
32	FW	RUS	Rifat Zhemaletdinov
35	GK	RUS	Filipp Kharin
36	MF	RUS	Dmitri Barinov
37	FW	RUS	Andrea Chukanov
38	GK	RUS	Aleksandr Akishin
39	FW	RUS	Denis Anisimov
43	DF	RUS	Andrei Chernetsov
44	DF	RUS	Aleksandr Logunov
46	DF	RUS	Artyom Vyatkin
52	MF	RUS	Sergei Makarov
54	DF	RUS	Vladislav Shadrin
56	DF	RUS	Tomas Rukas
57	FW	RUS	Artyom Galadzhan
61	DF	RUS	Maksim Danilyants
63	DF	RUS	Denis Nikitin
64	FW	RUS	Aleksandr Smirnov

No.	Pos.	Nation	Player
65	DF	RUS	Innokenti Samokhvalov
71	DF	RUS	Aleksei Solovyov
72	DF	RUS	Ratibor Gusar
73	DF	RUS	Dzhamshed Rakhmonov
74	GK	RUS	Pavel Kovalyov
82	MF	RUS	Georgi Makhatadze
83	DF	RUS	Viktor Fereferov
84	FW	RUS	Mikhail Lysov
87	FW	RUS	Nikolai Kipiani
89	MF	RUS	Nikita Dorofeyev
91	FW	RUS	Nikita Podyachev
93	MF	RUS	Andrei Mostovoy
94	MF	RUS	Dmitri Rybchinsky
95	FW	RUS	Nozim Babadzhanov
96	GK	RUS	Ilya Ishchenko
97	FW	RUS	Grigori Gerasimov
98	MF	RUS	Ivan Galanin

== Transfers ==
=== Summer ===
In: Note: Flags indicate national team as defined under FIFA eligibility rules; some limited exceptions apply. Players may hold more than one non-FIFA nationality.

No.	Pos.	Nation	Player
3	MF	RUS	Alan Kasaev (from (Russia) Rubin Kazan)
4	MF	POR	Manuel Fernandes (from (Turkey) Besiktas)
5	DF	SRB	Nemanja Pejčinović (from (France) Nice)
15	DF	RUS	Arseniy Logashov (end of loan to (Russia) Rostov)
16	GK	RUS	Ilya Lantratov (from (Russia) Lokomotiv-2 Moscow)
21	FW	SEN	Oumar Niasse (from (Turkey) Akhisar Belediyespor)
—	DF	RUS	Igor Golban (end of loan to (Russia) Khimki)
—	MF	NGR	Victor Obinna (end of loan to (Italy) ChievoVerona)
—	FW	RUS	Dmitri Sychev (end of loan to (Russia) Volga Nizhny Novgorod)

Out: Note: Flags indicate national team as defined under FIFA eligibility rules; some limited exceptions apply. Players may hold more than one non-FIFA nationality.

No.	Pos.	Nation	Player
16	GK	RUS	Aleksei Shirokov (end of loan from (Russia) Lokomotiv-2 Moscow)
34	DF	RUS	Mikhail Martynov (to (Russia) Rostov)
67	DF	RUS	Temur Mustafin (to (Russia) Rostov)
6	MF	RUS	Maksim Grigoryev (on loan to (Russia) Rostov)
27	MF	RUS	Magomed Ozdoev (on loan to (Russia) Rubin Kazan)
38	MF	RUS	Nikita Salamatov (to (Russia) Khimki)
90	MF	RUS	Aleksandr Lomakin (on loan to (Russia) Yenisey Krasnoyarsk)
92	FW	RUS	Aleksei Turik (to (Russia) Fakel Voronezh)
—	MF	FRA	Lassana Diarra (contract rescinded by club)
—	MF	RUS	Vyacheslav Podberyozkin (to (Russia) Ural Sverdlovsk Oblast, previously on loan to (Russia) Khimki)
—	FW	RUS	Mikhail Petrusyov (to (Russia) Dnepr Smolensk, previously on loan)

=== Winter ===
In: Note: Flags indicate national team as defined under FIFA eligibility rules; some limited exceptions apply. Players may hold more than one non-FIFA nationality.

No.	Pos.	Nation	Player
25	FW	SRB	Petar Škuletić (from (Serbia) Partizan)

Out: Note: Flags indicate national team as defined under FIFA eligibility rules; some limited exceptions apply. Players may hold more than one non-FIFA nationality.

No.	Pos.	Nation	Player
30	FW	RUS	Arshak Koryan (end of contract)
33	FW	SEN	Dame N'Doye (to (England) Hull City)
75	DF	RUS	Aleksandr Seraskhov (to (Russia) Sokol Saratov)
77	MF	RUS	Sergei Tkachyov (on loan to (Russia) Kuban)
—	FW	RUS	Dmitri Sychev (loan to (Kazakhstan) Okzhetpes)

== Competitions ==
=== Russian Premier League ===
==== Results by round ====
Round	1	2	3	4	5	6	7	8	9	10	11	12	13	14	15	16	17	18	19	20	21	22	23	24	25	26	27	28	29	30
Ground	H	A	H	A	A	H	H	A	H	H	A	H	A	H	H	H	A	A	H	A	A	H	A	A	A	A	H	H	H	A
Result	D	W	W	D	L	L	D	L	W	W	D	W	W	D	W	W	D	W	L	D	D	W	L	L	L	D	L	W	D	L
Position	8	6	3	6	8	8	9	10	9	9	9	8	7	8	5	5	5	5	5	7	7	6	6	7	7	7	7	7	7	7

Updated to match(es) played on 31 May 2015. Source: Russian Premier League
A = Away; H = Home; W = Win; D = Draw; L = Loss

==== Matches ====
3 August 2014 1	Lokomotiv Moscow	0–0	Krasnodar	Moscow
21:30 MSK (UTC+4)		Summary		Stadium: Lokomotiv Stadium; Attendance: 12,175; Referee: Sergey Lapochkin

10 August 2014 2	Arsenal Tula	0–2	Lokomotiv Moscow	Tula
19:30 MSK (UTC+4)		Summary	Fernandes 53'; N'Doye 83'	Stadium: Arsenal Stadium; Attendance: 17,000; Referee: Sergei Ivanov

14 August 2014 3	Lokomotiv Moscow	2–1	Rostov	Moscow
18:30 MSK (UTC+4)	Kasaev 5'; Samedov 21'; Ćorluka (red card) 70'	Summary	Kalachev (red card) 45+2'; Poloz 72' (pen.)	Stadium: Lokomotiv Stadium; Attendance: 7,014; Referee: Kirill Levnikov

17 August 2014 4	Rubin Kazan	1–1	Lokomotiv Moscow	Kazan
18:30 MSK (UTC+4)	Karadeniz 31' (pen.)	Summary	Al. Miranchuk 26'	Stadium: Kazan Arena; Attendance: 36,850; Referee: Mikhail Vilkov

24 August 2014 5	Kuban Krasnodar	2–1	Lokomotiv Moscow	Krasnodar
19:30 MSK (UTC+4)	Melgarejo 26'; Šunjić 41'; Oliseh (yellow card) 63' (yellow-red card) 90'	Summary	Fernandes 77' (pen.)	Stadium: Kuban Stadium; Attendance: 12,172; Referee: Vladislav Bezborodov

31 August 2014 6	Lokomotiv Moscow	0–1	Zenit St. Petersburg	Moscow
18:00 MSK (UTC+4)		Summary	García 60'	Stadium: Lokomotiv Stadium; Attendance: 14,747; Referee: Aleksandr Egorov

13 September 2014 7	Lokomotiv Moscow	1–1	Mordovia Saransk	Moscow
16:00 MSK (UTC+4)	Niasse 68'	Summary	Vasin 14'	Stadium: Lokomotiv Stadium; Attendance: 7,640; Referee: Igor Nizovtsev

21 September 2014 8	CSKA Moscow	1–0	Lokomotiv Moscow	Khimki
13:30 MSK (UTC+4)	Musa 33'	Summary		Stadium: Arena Khimki; Attendance: 11,000; Referee: Aleksei Nikolaev

28 September 2014 9	Lokomotiv Moscow	3–1	Amkar Perm	Moscow
16:00 MSK (UTC+4)	Ćorluka 66', 77'; Niasse 67'	Summary	Jovičić 74'	Stadium: Lokomotiv Stadium; Attendance: 8,851; Referee: Vladislav Bezborodov

20 October 2014 10	Lokomotiv Moscow	2–1	Terek Grozny	Moscow
19:30 MSK (UTC+4)	Niasse 9'; Pavlyuchenko 73' (pen.)	Summary	Niasse 43' (o.g.)	Stadium: Lokomotiv Stadium; Attendance: 7,240; Referee: Sergei Ivanov

26 October 2014 11	Spartak Moscow	1–1	Lokomotiv Moscow	Moscow
12:30 MSK (UTC+3)	Shirokov 87'	Summary	Fernandes 84'	Stadium: Otkrytie Arena; Attendance: 39,074; Referee: Igor Fedotov

2 November 2014 12	Lokomotiv Moscow	4–2	Dynamo Moscow	Moscow
12:30 MSK (UTC+3)	Boussoufa (penalty missed); N'Doye 58'; Samedov 60'; Kasaev 66'; Pavlyuchenko 85'	Summary	Ionov 37'; Dzsudzsák 50'	Stadium: Lokomotiv Stadium; Attendance: 10,271; Referee: Aleksei Nikolaev

8 November 2014 13	Torpedo Moscow	0–1	Lokomotiv Moscow	Ramenskoye
16:00 MSK (UTC+3)		Summary	N'Doye 60'	Stadium: Saturn Stadium; Attendance: 5,150; Referee: Aleksandr Egorov

24 November 2014 14	Lokomotiv Moscow	0–0	Ufa	Moscow
19:00 MSK (UTC+3)	Denisov (red card) 81'	Summary		Stadium: Lokomotiv Stadium; Attendance: 4,714; Referee: Igor Nizovtsev

30 November 2014 15	Lokomotiv Moscow	1–0	Spartak Moscow	Moscow
12:30 MSK (UTC+3)	Kasaev 77'	Summary		Stadium: Lokomotiv Stadium; Attendance: 13,760; Referee: Mikhail Vilkov

3 December 2014 16	Lokomotiv Moscow	1–0	Ural Sverdlovsk Oblast	Moscow
18:00 MSK (UTC+3)	N'Doye 90'	Summary		Stadium: Lokomotiv Stadium; Attendance: 3,120; Referee: Kirill Levnikov

7 December 2014 17	Terek Grozny	0–0	Lokomotiv Moscow	Grozny
13:30 MSK (UTC+3)		Summary		Stadium: Akhmat-Arena; Attendance: 19,435; Referee: Aleksandr Egorov

8 March 2015 18	Rostov	0–1	Lokomotiv Moscow	Rostov-on-Don
18:30 MSK (UTC+3)		Summary	Škuletić 64'	Stadium: Olimp-2; Attendance: 13,000; Referee: Aleksandr Egorov

14 March 2015 19	Lokomotiv Moscow	0–1	Arsenal Tula	Moscow
19:00 MSK (UTC+3)		Summary	Zotov 66'	Stadium: Lokomotiv Stadium; Attendance: 8,427; Referee: Sergey Lapochkin

22 March 2015 20	Mordovia Saransk	0–0	Lokomotiv Moscow	Saransk
16:00 MSK (UTC+3)		Summary	Mykhalyk (yellow card) 14' (yellow-red card) 90'	Stadium: Start Stadium; Attendance: 7,787; Referee: Mikhail Vilkov

4 April 2015 21	Dynamo Moscow	2–2	Lokomotiv Moscow	Khimki
14:15 MSK (UTC+3)	Vainqueur 40'; Kurányi 49' (pen.)	Summary	Škuletić 45'; Sheshukov (red card) 47'; Fernandes 78' (pen.)	Stadium: Arena Khimki; Attendance: 7,023; Referee: Vladislav Bezborodov

8 April 2015 22	Lokomotiv Moscow	2–0	Torpedo Moscow	Moscow
20:00 MSK (UTC+3)	Fernandes 71', 74' (pen.)	Summary	Rykov (red card) 45+1'	Stadium: Lokomotiv Stadium; Attendance: 9,721; Referee: Alexey Nikolaev

13 April 2015 23	Ural Sverdlovsk Oblast	2–0	Lokomotiv Moscow	Tyumen
15:00 MSK (UTC+3)	Mykhalyk 6' (o.g.); Smolov 60'	Summary		Stadium: Geolog Stadium; Attendance: 6,000; Referee: Vladimir Moskalyov

18 April 2015 24	Ufa	1–0	Lokomotiv Moscow	Perm
13:00 MSK (UTC+3)	Paurević 50'	Summary		Stadium: Zvezda Stadium; Attendance: 700; Referee: Igor Nizovtsev

25 April 2015 25	Krasnodar	1–0	Lokomotiv Moscow	Krasnodar
19:00 MSK (UTC+3)	Pereyra 37' (pen.)	Summary		Stadium: Kuban Stadium; Attendance: 18,347; Referee: Sergey Lapochkin

3 May 2015 26	Amkar Perm	1–1	Lokomotiv Moscow	Perm
16:00 MSK (UTC+3)	Peev 67' (pen.)	Summary	Samedov 90+4'	Stadium: Zvezda Stadium; Attendance: 11,180; Referee: Igor Nizovtsev

10 May 2015 27	Lokomotiv Moscow	1–3	CSKA Moscow	Moscow
13:30 MSK (UTC+3)	Niasse 38'	Summary	Dzagoev 35'; Tošić 56'; Natcho 68' (pen.)	Stadium: Lokomotiv Stadium; Attendance: 14,870; Referee: Sergey Karasev

16 May 2015 28	Lokomotiv Moscow	3–0	Rubin Kazan	Moscow
19:00 MSK (UTC+3)	Boussoufa 39'; Pavlyuchenko 56'; Samedov 90' (pen.)	Summary		Stadium: Lokomotiv Stadium; Attendance: 4,730; Referee: Sergei Ivanov

25 May 2015 29	Lokomotiv Moscow	1–1	Kuban Krasnodar	Moscow
18:30 MSK (UTC+3)	Fernandes 87'; Niasse (red card) 81'	Summary	Baldé 22'	Stadium: Lokomotiv Stadium; Attendance: 5,054; Referee: Kirill Levnikov

30 May 2015 30	Zenit St. Petersburg	1–0	Lokomotiv Moscow	Saint Petersburg
13:30 MSK (UTC+3)	Rondón 61'	Summary	Tarasov (red card) 55'	Stadium: Petrovsky Stadium; Attendance: 17,524; Referee: Igor Nizovtsev

==== League table ====
Pos	Team	Pld	W	D	L	GF	GA	GD	Pts	Qualification or relegation
5	Rubin Kazan	30	13	9	8	39	33	+6	48	Qualification for the Europa League third qualifying round
6	Spartak Moscow	30	12	8	10	42	42	0	44	
7	Lokomotiv Moscow	30	11	10	9	31	25	+6	43	Qualification for the Europa League group stage (Note: Lokomotiv Moscow qualified for Europa League group stage by winning the 2014–15 Russian Cup.)
8	Mordovia Saransk	30	11	5	14	22	43	−21	38	
9	Terek Grozny	30	10	7	13	30	30	0	37	

Source: Russian Premier League
Rules for classification: 1) points; 2) number of matches won; 3) head-to-head points; 4) head-to-head wins; 5) head-to-head goal difference; 6) head-to-head goals; 7) number of head-to-head away goals; 8) goal difference; 9) number of goals scored; 10) number of away goals scored

=== Russian Cup ===
25 September 2014 Round of 32	Sibir Novosibirsk	1–3	Lokomotiv Moscow	Novosibirsk
18:00 MSK (UTC+4)	Markosov 80'	Summary	Boussoufa 23' (pen.); Denisov 61'; Niasse 78'	Stadium: Spartak Stadium; Attendance: 10,000; Referee: Andrey Fisenko

29 October 2014 Round of 16	Ufa	0–1	Lokomotiv Moscow	Ufa
17:00 MSK (UTC+3)		Summary	Boussoufa 19'	Stadium: Dynamo Stadium; Attendance: 3,600; Referee: Vladimir Moskalyov

3 March 2015 Quarterfinal	Lokomotiv Moscow	0–0 (a.e.t.) (4–2 p)	Rubin Kazan	Moscow
19:00 MSK (UTC+3)		Summary; Pens		Stadium: Lokomotiv Stadium; Attendance: 8,223; Referee: Vladislav Bezborodov
	Penalties
	Fernandes (penalty scored); Samedov (penalty scored); Ćorluka (penalty scored); Škuletić (penalty scored)		Karadeniz (penalty missed); Livaja (penalty missed); Kuzmin (penalty scored); Navas (penalty scored)

29 April 2015 Semifinal	Gazovik Orenburg	1–1 (a.e.t.) (3–4 p)	Lokomotiv Moscow	Orenburg
16:30 MSK (UTC+3)	Vasiev 50'; Appayev (yellow card) 80' (yellow-red card)	Summary	Škuletić 87'	Stadium: Gazovik Stadium; Attendance: 4,500; Referee: Aleksandr Egorov
	Penalties
	Shogenov (penalty missed); Kobyalko (penalty scored); Druzin (penalty scored); Akhmedov (penalty missed); Malykh (penalty scored)		Fernandes (penalty scored); Škuletić (penalty missed); Samedov (penalty scored); Maicon (penalty scored); Pejčinović (penalty scored)

21 May 2015 Final	Lokomotiv Moscow	3–1 (a.e.t.)	Kuban Krasnodar	Astrakhan
19:00 MSK (UTC+3)	Niasse 73'; Boussoufa 104'; Al. Miranchuk 111'	Summary	Ignatyev 28'	Stadium: Central Stadium; Attendance: 16,000; Referee: Vladislav Bezborodov

=== UEFA Europa League ===
==== Qualifying phase ====
21 August 2014 Play-off round 1st leg	Apollon Limassol (Cyprus)	1–1	(Russia) Lokomotiv Moscow	Nicosia, Cyprus
21:30 MSK (UTC+4)	Gneki Guié 80'	Report	Kasaev 39'; Tsiharow (red card) 76'; Denisov (yellow card) 63' (yellow-red card) 87'	Stadium: GSP Stadium; Attendance: 7,146; Referee: Ivan Bebek (Croatia)

28 August 2014 Play-off round 2nd leg	Lokomotiv Moscow (Russia)	1–4 (2–5 agg.)	(Cyprus) Apollon Limassol	Moscow, Russia
19:00 MSK (UTC+4)	Pavlyuchenko 85'	Report	Rezek 20'; Papoulis 51'; Thuram 78'; López 83'	Stadium: Lokomotiv Stadium; Attendance: 6,520; Referee: Stefan Johannesson (Sweden)

== Squad statistics ==
As of 31 May 2015

=== Appearances and goals ===
No.	Pos	Nat	Player	Total		Premier League		Russian Cup		Europa League	
No.	Pos	Nat	Player	Apps	Goals	Apps	Goals	Apps	Goals	Apps	Goals
1	GK	(Brazil) BRA	Guilherme	25	0	19	0	3+1	0	2	0
3	MF	(Russia) RUS	Alan Kasaev	31	4	18+8	3	3	0	2	1
4	MF	(Portugal) POR	Manuel Fernandes	35	7	20+8	7	4+1	0	2	0
5	DF	(Serbia) SRB	Nemanja Pejčinović	19	0	10+4	0	4	0	1	0
7	MF	(Brazil) BRA	Maicon	30	0	13+11	0	3+1	0	1+1	0
8	MF	(Russia) RUS	Aleksandr Sheshukov	17	0	12+3	0	2	0	0	0
9	FW	(Russia) RUS	Roman Pavlyuchenko	23	4	5+15	3	2	0	0+1	1
11	MF	(Morocco) MAR	Mbark Boussoufa	20	4	15+2	1	3	3	0	0
14	DF	(Croatia) CRO	Vedran Ćorluka	32	2	26	2	4	0	2	0
15	DF	(Russia) RUS	Arseniy Logashov	10	0	7	0	2+1	0	0	0
17	MF	(Ukraine) UKR	Taras Mykhalyk	20	0	12+4	0	3	0	0+1	0
19	MF	(Russia) RUS	Aleksandr Samedov	36	4	29	4	4+1	0	1+1	0
21	FW	(Senegal) SEN	Oumar Niasse	19	6	8+5	4	1+3	2	2	0
22	DF	(Russia) RUS	Maksim Belyayev	0	0	0	0	0	0	0	0
23	MF	(Russia) RUS	Dmitri Tarasov	18	0	13+1	0	1+1	0	2	0
25	FW	(Serbia) SRB	Petar Škuletić	13	3	7+4	2	1+1	1	0	0
26	MF	(Belarus) BLR	Yan Tsiharow	6	0	3+2	0	0	0	1	0
28	DF	(Slovakia) SVK	Ján Ďurica	25	0	21	0	2	0	2	0
29	DF	(Uzbekistan) UZB	Vitaliy Denisov	31	0	26	0	4	0	1	0
36	MF	(Russia) RUS	Dmitri Barinov	2	0	0+2	0	0	0	0	0
49	DF	(Russia) RUS	Roman Shishkin	29	0	20+3	0	4	0	2	0
55	DF	(Russia) RUS	Renat Yanbayev	17	0	15+1	0	1	0	0	0
59	MF	(Russia) RUS	Aleksei Miranchuk	21	2	10+7	1	1+2	1	0+1	0
81	GK	(Russia) RUS	Ilya Abayev	13	0	11	0	2	0	0	0
Players away from the club on loan:
6	MF	(Russia) RUS	Maksim Grigoryev	0	0	0	0	0	0	0	0
27	MF	(Russia) RUS	Magomed Ozdoyev	0	0	0	0	0	0	0	0
77	MF	(Russia) RUS	Sergei Tkachyov	6	0	1+3	0	1+1	0	0	0
Players who appeared for Lokomotiv Moscow no longer at the club:
33	FW	(Senegal) SEN	Dame N'Doye	15	4	9+5	4	0	0	0+1	0
75	DF	(Russia) RUS	Aleksandr Seraskhov	1	0	0	0	0	0	1	0

=== Goalscorers ===
Place	Position	Nation	Number	Name	Russian Premier League	Russian Cup	UEFA Europa League	Total
1	MF	(Portugal)	4	Manuel Fernandes	7	0	0	7
2	FW	(Senegal)	21	Oumar Niasse	4	2	0	6
3	FW	(Senegal)	33	Dame N'Doye	4	0	0	4
3	MF	(Russia)	3	Alan Kasaev	3	0	1	4
3	FW	(Russia)	9	Roman Pavlyuchenko	3	0	1	4
3	MF	(Russia)	19	Aleksandr Samedov	4	0	0	4
3	MF	(Morocco)	11	Mbark Boussoufa	1	3	0	4
8	FW	(Serbia)	25	Petar Škuletić	2	1	0	3
9	DF	(Croatia)	14	Vedran Ćorluka	2	0	0	2
9	MF	(Russia)	59	Aleksei Miranchuk	1	1	0	2
11	Own goals				0	1	0	1
				TOTALS	30	8	2	40

=== Disciplinary record ===
Number	Nation	Position	Name	Russian Premier League		Russian Cup		UEFA Europa League		Total	
Number	Nation	Position	Name	Yellow card	Red card	Yellow card	Red card	Yellow card	Red card	Yellow card	Red card
1	(Brazil)	GK	Guilherme	1	0	0	0	0	0	1	0
3	(Russia)	MF	Alan Kasaev	3	0	0	0	0	0	3	0
4	(Portugal)	MF	Manuel Fernandes	4	0	0	0	0	0	4	0
5	(Serbia)	DF	Nemanja Pejčinović	2	0	2	0	0	0	4	0
7	(Brazil)	MF	Maicon	5	0	0	0	1	0	6	0
8	(Russia)	MF	Aleksandr Sheshukov	2	1	1	0	0	0	3	1
9	(Russia)	FW	Roman Pavlyuchenko	2	0	0	0	0	0	2	0
11	(Morocco)	MF	Mbark Boussoufa	5	0	1	0	0	0	6	0
14	(Croatia)	DF	Vedran Ćorluka	6	1	1	0	0	0	7	1
15	(Russia)	DF	Arseniy Logashov	2	0	0	0	0	0	2	0
17	(Ukraine)	MF	Taras Mykhalyk	6	1	0	0	0	0	6	1
19	(Russia)	MF	Aleksandr Samedov	2	0	1	0	0	0	3	0
21	(Senegal)	FW	Oumar Niasse	1	1	0	0	0	0	1	1
23	(Russia)	MF	Dmitri Tarasov	6	2	2	0	0	0	8	2
25	(Serbia)	FW	Petar Škuletić	1	0	0	0	0	0	1	0
26	(Belarus)	MF	Yan Tsiharow	1	0	0	0	0	1	1	1
28	(Slovakia)	DF	Ján Ďurica	4	0	1	0	1	0	6	0
29	(Uzbekistan)	DF	Vitaliy Denisov	4	1	0	0	0	1	5	2
33	(Senegal)	FW	Dame N'Doye	3	0	0	0	0	0	3	0
49	(Russia)	DF	Roman Shishkin	5	0	1	0	1	0	7	0
55	(Russia)	DF	Renat Yanbayev	2	0	1	0	0	0	3	0
59	(Russia)	MF	Aleksei Miranchuk	1	0	0	0	0	0	1	0
77	(Russia)	MF	Sergei Tkachyov	1	0	0	0	0	0	1	0
			TOTALS	69	7	11	0	3	2	83	9

=== Club captains ===
During the season, three players fulfilled the duties of club captain: captain Guilherme and vice-captains Roman Shishkin and Aleksandr Samedov.

Matchdays	Number	Name	Manager
1–4	1	(Brazil) Guilherme	(Belarus) Kuchuk
5–6	49	(Russia) Shishkin	(Belarus) Kuchuk
7–8	1	(Brazil) Guilherme	(Belarus) Kuchuk (Tajikistan) Cherevchenko
9	49	(Russia) Shishkin	(Tajikistan) Cherevchenko
10–14	19	(Russia) Samedov	(Montenegro) Božović
15–17	49	(Russia) Shishkin	(Montenegro) Božović
18–30	1	(Brazil) Guilherme	(Montenegro) Božović (Tajikistan) Cherevchenko

=== Player of the Month ===
During the season, Lokomotiv ran a monthly poll on social networks to gauge the fans player of the month.

Month	Pos.	Nat.	Name	Award
August	FW	(Russia)	Arshak Koryan	Won
September	FW	(Senegal)	Oumar Niasse	Won
October	MF	(Portugal)	Manuel Fernandes	Won
November	MF	(Russia)	Alan Kasaev	Won
December	DF	(Croatia)	Vedran Ćorluka	Won
March	GK	(Brazil)	Guilherme	Won
April, May	MF	(Russia)	Aleksei Miranchuk	Won

=== Player of the Year ===
After the season, Lokomotiv fans' poll named the team's player of the year.

Place	Pos.	Nat.	Name	% of votes
1st	DF	(Croatia)	Vedran Ćorluka	36,9
2nd	MF	(Russia)	Aleksei Miranchuk	19,9
3rd	DF	(Uzbekistan)	Vitaliy Denisov	12,7

== Notes ==
- MSK time changed from UTC+4 to UTC+3 permanently on 26 October 2014.
