= 2015 Russian Cup final =

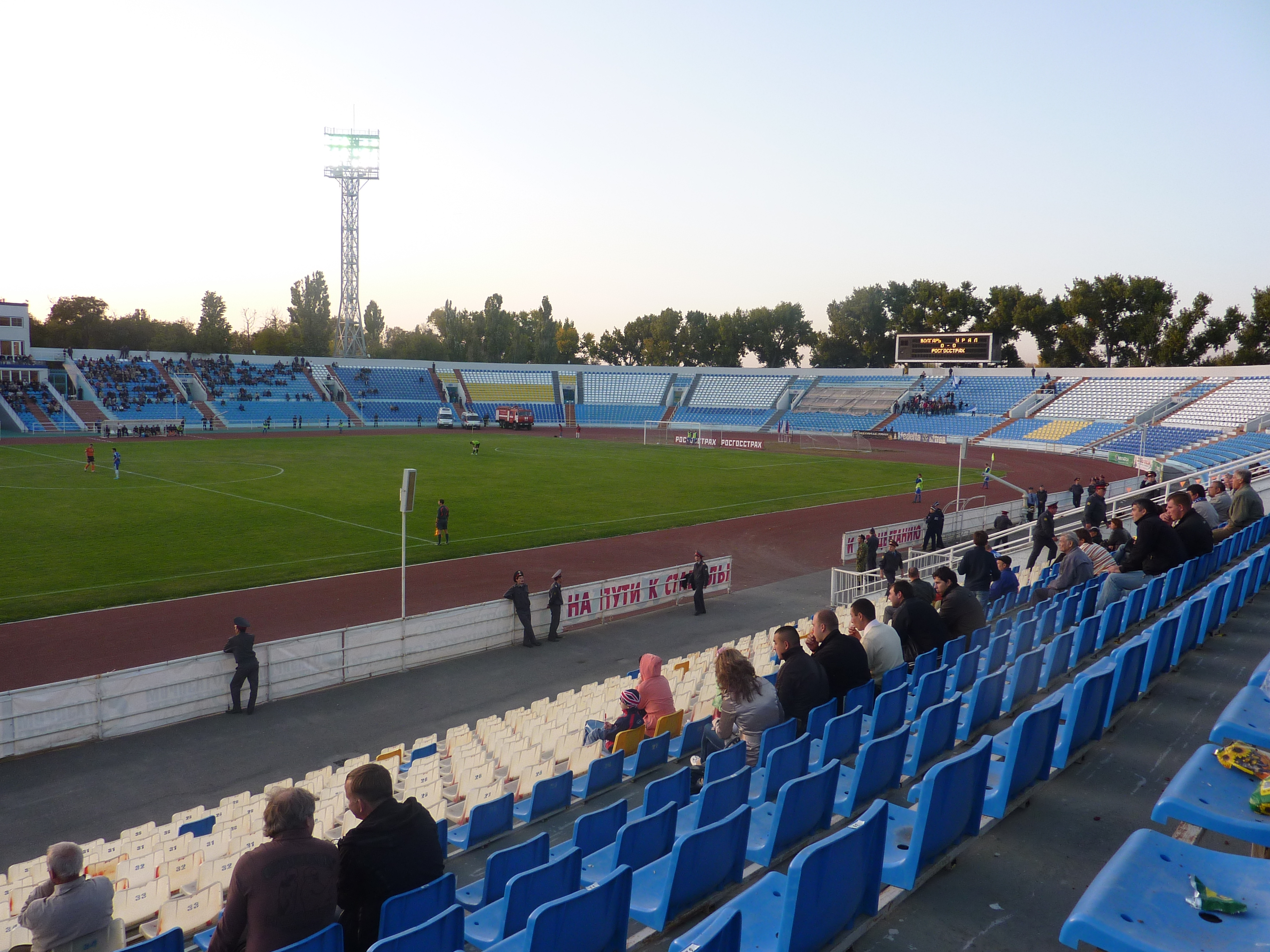
- The Central Stadium hosted the final
- Event: 2014–15 Russian Cup
Lokomotiv Moscow	Kuban Krasnodar
3	1
- After extra time
- Date: 21 May 2015
- Venue: Central Stadium, Astrakhan
- Referee: Vladislav Bezborodov
- Attendance: 14,300

The 2015 Russian Cup final decided the winner of the 2014–15 Russian Cup, the 23rd season of Russia's main football cup. It was played on 21 May 2015 at the Central Stadium in Astrakhan, between Lokomotiv Moscow and Kuban Krasnodar. Lokomotiv came back from behind and emerged victorious with a 3-1 win in extra time.

The winner qualified for the group stage of the UEFA Europa League and also faced the champions of the 2014–15 Russian Premier League, Zenit Saint Petersburg in the Russian Super Cup on 12 July 2015.

== Venue ==
The Russian Cup final was held for the first time ever at Central Stadium in Astrakhan. Kuban Stadium in Krasnodar and Otkrytie Arena in Moscow were touted to be other potential alternatives but ultimately the stadium was announced by the Russian Football Union as the venue of the final through an official statement on Twitter on 30 March 2015.

Central Stadium is the home stadium of Volgar Astrakhan and it holds 17,500 people, all seated. The stadium was originally built in 1955 but it underwent a total reconstruction in the summer of 2013. The stadium has been earmarked as a training facility for the 2018 FIFA World Cup.

== Background ==
Lokomotiv played their 7th Russian Cup final, second only to CSKA's 10. Prior to the 2015 final, they have won five, against the seven won by their cross town rivals. Their most recent appearance at the final was in 2007. Indeed, they faced the now-defunct FC Moscow and won the contest courtesy of a goal from Garry O'Connor in extra-time.

As for Kuban, it was their first ever appearance at the Russian Cup final. Indeed, their best performance ever in the Russian Cup came in 2012–13 Russian Cup, when they were eliminated by Zenit on penalties in the quarter-finals. As a side note, Leonid Kuchuk, the current manager of Kuban, faced Lokomotiv in the final after he was sacked from the same position earlier this season following a disappointing start at the helm of the Muscovite club.

It was also the first time that the two clubs met in the Russian Cup final.

== Road to the final ==
Lokomotiv		Round	Kuban
Opponent	Result	2014–15 Russian Cup	Opponent	Result
Sibir Novosibirsk	3–1	Round of 32	Baltika Kaliningrad	2–1
FC Ufa	1–0	Round of 16	FC Tosno	3–0
Rubin Kazan	0–0 (4–2 pen)	Quarter-finals	Mordovia Saransk	1–0
Gazovik Orenburg	1–1 (4–3 pen)	Semi-finals	CSKA Moscow	1–0

== Match ==
=== Details ===
21 May 2015
19:00 MSK (UTC+3)

Lokomotiv Moscow	3–1 (a.e.t.)	Kuban Krasnodar
Niasse 73'; Boussoufa 104'; Al. Miranchuk 111'	Summary	Ignatyev 28'

Central Stadium, Astrakhan
Attendance: 14,300
Referee: Vladislav Bezborodov (Saint Petersburg)

Lokomotiv Moscow	Kuban Krasnodar

GK	1	(Brazil) Guilherme (c)
DF	5	(Serbia) Nemanja Pejčinović	(yellow card) 45'
DF	14	(Croatia) Vedran Ćorluka	(yellow card) 90'
DF	15	(Russia) Arseny Logashov
DF	29	(Uzbekistan) Vitaliy Denisov
MF	3	(Russia) Alan Kasaev		(substituted off) 108'
MF	4	(Portugal) Manuel Fernandes		(substituted off) 71'
MF	11	(Morocco) Mbark Boussoufa	(yellow card) 87'
MF	19	(Russia) Aleksandr Samedov	(yellow card) 82'
MF	49	(Russia) Roman Shishkin
FW	9	(Russia) Roman Pavlyuchenko		(substituted off) 64'
Substitutes:
GK	41	(Russia) Miroslav Lobantsev
DF	17	(Ukraine) Taras Mykhalyk
DF	55	(Russia) Renat Yanbayev
MF	7	(Brazil) Maicon		(substituted on) 108'
MF	59	(Russia) Aleksei Miranchuk		(substituted on) 71'
FW	21	(Senegal) Baye Oumar Niasse		(substituted on) 64'
FW	25	(Serbia) Petar Škuletić
Manager:
(Tajikistan) Igor Cherevchenko

GK	23	(Russia) Aleksandr Belenov (c)
DF	2	(Moldova) Igor Armaș
DF	14	(Bosnia and Herzegovina) Toni Šunjić	(yellow card) 72'
DF	22	(Russia) Anton Sosnin
DF	43	(Russia) Roman Bugayev
MF	10	(Burkina Faso) Charles Kaboré
MF	17	(Ghana) Mohammed Rabiu	(yellow card) 33'
MF	18	(Russia) Vladislav Ignatyev	(yellow card) 103'	(substituted off) 105'
MF	71	(Bulgaria) Ivelin Popov
MF	77	(Russia) Sergei Tkachyov		(substituted off) 80'
FW	20	(Portugal) Hugo Almeida		(substituted off) 69'
Substitutes:
GK	13	(Russia) Yevgeny Pomazan
DF	4	(Brazil) Xandão
DF	25	(Paraguay) Lorenzo Melgarejo
MF	7	(Russia) Vladislav Kulik		(substituted on) 105'
MF	8	(Russia) Artur Tlisov
FW	11	(Romania) Gheorghe Bucur		(substituted on) 80'
FW	99	(Senegal) Ibrahima Baldé		(substituted on) 69'
Manager:
(Belarus) Leonid Kuchuk

Match officials

- Assistant referees:
  - Nikolay Golubev (Saint Petersburg)
  - Andrey Vereteshkin (Saint Petersburg)
- Reserve official: Sergei Lapochkin (Saint Petersburg)
- Match inspector: Stanislav Sukhina (Malakhovka)

Match rules

- 90 minutes.
- 30 minutes of extra-time if necessary.
- Penalty shoot-out if scores still level.
- Seven named substitutes.
- Maximum of three substitutions.
