= Oumar Niasse =

Senegalese footballer

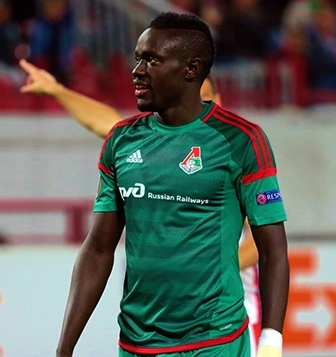
- Niasse with Lokomotiv Moscow in 2015

Personal information
- Full name: El Hadji Baye Oumar Niasse
- Date of birth: 18 April 1990 (age 36)
- Place of birth: Ouakam, Senegal
- Height: 1.82 m (6 ft 0 in)
- Position: Forward

Senior career*
Years	Team	Apps	(Gls)
2008–2013	US Ouakam		
2012	→ Brann (loan)	3	(0)
2013–2014	Akhisar Belediyespor	34	(12)
2014–2016	Lokomotiv Moscow	28	(12)
2016–2020	Everton	35	(8)
2017	→ Hull City (loan)	17	(4)
2019	→ Cardiff City (loan)	13	(0)
2021	Huddersfield Town	0	(0)
2022	Burton Albion	12	(3)
2023	Morecambe	10	(1)
2023–2024	Macclesfield	5	(0)
Total		157+	(40+)

International career
2011	Senegal U23	6	(0)
2013–2018	Senegal	9	(3)
- * Club domestic league appearances and goals

El Hadji Baye Oumar Niasse (born 18 April 1990) is a Senegalese former professional footballer who played as a forward.

Niasse played top-flight football in Senegal, Norway, Turkey, Russia and England. He won the 2011 Senegal Premier League with Ouakam and scored in Lokomotiv Moscow's win in the 2015 Russian Cup Final. He signed for Everton for a £13.5 million transfer fee in 2016. Niasse made his full international debut for Senegal in 2013.

== Club career ==
=== Ouakam ===
Born in Ouakam, Dakar Department, Niasse began his football career with hometown club US Ouakam in the second tier. He signed his first professional contract with Ouakam in 2008 and in the 2008–09 season helped his team win the Second League title by scoring 21 goals. Playing as a winger, Niasse also played a key role in Ouakam winning the Senegal Premier League title in 2011.

Niasse started a trial with Norwegian club Brann in February 2012, and after impressing signed for the club on a six-month loan. His time in Norway was hampered by poor form and injuries, and he returned to Senegal after playing just three Tippeligaen matches.

=== Akhisar Belediyespor ===
After a trial period with French club Saint-Étienne, Niasse was offered a contract to join the club but refused the offer. He joined the summer camp of Turkish Süper Lig club Akhisar Belediyespor and signed permanently with them in August 2013. Niasse scored on his debut in Turkey and ultimately finished the season with 15 goals.

=== Lokomotiv Moscow ===
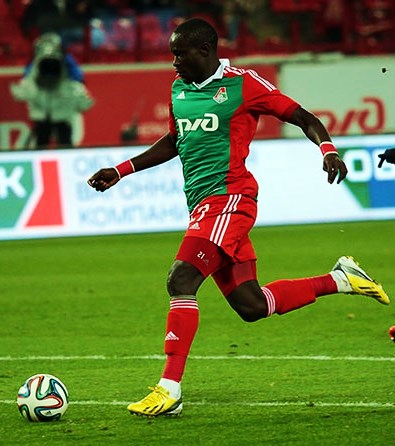
Niasse in action for Lokomotiv against Terek Grozny in October 2014

Before the 2014–15 season, Niasse signed with Russian club Lokomotiv Moscow in July 2014 for a €5.5 million transfer fee. He scored Lokomotiv's equalising goal in the Russian Cup Final against Kuban Krasnodar on 21 May 2015 as his side went on to win 3–1 after extra time.

=== Everton ===
Niasse joined English Premier League club Everton on 1 February 2016 for a transfer fee of approximately £13.5 million, signing a four-and-a-half-year contract. He made his debut for the club against AFC Bournemouth on 20 February 2016, entering as an 80th-minute substitute for striker Romelu Lukaku.

After 152 minutes of football in his first season at the club, Niasse was not given a squad number for the following 2016–17 season. He was informed by then-Everton manager Ronald Koeman he would need to search for a new club during the summer 2016 transfer window, saying, "[I]f Niasse likes to play football he needs to leave Everton."

However, following the close of the transfer deadline for loaning and signing players in England, he was listed as part of the 25-man Everton squad for the 2016–17 season submitted on 1 September 2016 and eventually issued squad number 24.

In October 2016, Niasse was demoted to the under-23 squad and had his personal locker revoked.

==== Loan to Hull City ====
On 13 January 2017, Niasse signed a loan contract with Hull City until the end of the 2016–17 season with an option for a £10 million permanent transfer from Everton. He made his debut the next day as an 83rd-minute substitute for Abel Hernández in a 3–1 home win against AFC Bournemouth. His first goal for Hull and in English football came on 26 January in the EFL Cup semi-final second leg against Manchester United, where he made his first start for the club. Hull won the second leg 2–1 but ultimately lost the tie 3–2 on aggregate.

Niasse scored his first Premier League goal in a 2–0 victory against Liverpool on 4 February. On 11 March, he came on as a substitute against Swansea City and scored both goals in a 2–1 victory. Hull were relegated to the Championship at the end of the season and opted not to exercise its option to outright purchase Niasse.

==== Return to Everton ====
After returning to Everton, Niasse made his first appearance since his return as a substitute in the EFL Cup third round match against Sunderland at Goodison Park on 20 September 2017, scoring Everton's third goal of a 3–0 win. Manager Ronald Koeman named Niasse in Everton's 25-man Premier League squad upon his return from loan and consequently issued him a squad number. However, Koeman omitted Niasse from Everton's UEFA Europa League squad. On 23 September, Niasse scored two goals against AFC Bournemouth in a 2–1 Premier League win, helping Everton to come back from a goal down. On 5 November, Niasse scored Everton's first goal in a 3–2 home win against Watford, having been losing 2–0. Thirteen days later, he scored in a 2–2 draw away to bottom side Crystal Palace. Niasse sparked controversy in the match by appearing to dive to win Everton a penalty, which was converted by Leighton Baines to make the score 1–1 in the first half. He subsequently became the first Premier League player to be charged with "successful deception of a match official" under The Football Association's new regulations. Everton appealed the verdict, but the FA rejected the appeal and Niasse received a two-match suspension.

==== Loan to Cardiff City ====
On 18 January 2019, Niasse joined fellow Premier League team Cardiff City on loan for the remainder of the season.

==== Return to Everton ====
Niasse only played 3 Premier League games during the 2019–20 season, failing to start any of them, as Dominic Calvert-Lewin and Richarlison were the preferred attacking options.

On 26 June 2020, Everton announced that they had not extended his contract until the end of the extended 2019–20 Premier League, and he was released by the club on 1 July along with teammates Cuco Martina and Luke Garbutt.

=== Huddersfield Town ===
On 26 March 2021, after a period of training with the club, Niasse signed for EFL Championship side Huddersfield Town. He never made an appearance for the club and left when his contract expired in June 2021.

=== Burton Albion ===
On 17 February 2022, Niasse signed for EFL League One side Burton Albion following a short period of training with the club. Niasse scored three goals in twelve appearances in his time at the club before being released at the end of the 2021–22 season.

=== Morecambe ===
On 10 March 2023, Niasse signed for relegation threatened League One club Morecambe on a short-term contract until the end of the season.

=== Macclesfield ===
On 23 November 2023, Niasse joined seventh-tier Northern Premier League Premier Division club Macclesfield on a short-term contract. On 29 January 2024, Niasse left the club.

== International career ==
Niasse was first selected for the Senegal national team in January 2013 as part of an all domestic-based squad. He made his debut on 15 January, starting in a 2–1 friendly loss to Chile in La Serena.

On 25 May 2015, Niasse scored his first international goals, a brace in a 3–1 win over Kosovo at the Stade de Genève. He last played for his country in 2018, and has appeared nine times in total, scoring three goals.

== Personal life ==
His brother, Ibrahima Niasse, is also a professional footballer.

== Career statistics ==
=== Club ===
As of match played 30 April 2022

Appearances and goals by club, season and competition
Club	Season	League			National Cup		League Cup		Other		Total	
Club	Season	Division	Apps	Goals	Apps	Goals	Apps	Goals	Apps	Goals	Apps	Goals
Brann (loan)	2012	Tippeligaen	3	0	1	0	—		—		4	0
Akhisar Belediyespor	2013–14	Süper Lig	34	12	6	3	—		—		40	15
Lokomotiv Moscow	2014–15	Russian Premier League	13	4	4	2	—		2 (Note: Appearances in the UEFA Europa League)	0	19	6
Lokomotiv Moscow	2015–16	Russian Premier League	15	8	1	0	—		7 (Note: Six appearances and four goals in the UEFA Europa League, one appearance and one goal in Russian Super Cup)	5	23	13
Lokomotiv Moscow	Total		28	12	5	2	—		9	5	42	19
Everton	2015–16	Premier League	5	0	2	0	—		—		7	0
Everton	2016–17	Premier League	0	0	—		—		—		0	0
Everton	2017–18	Premier League	22	8	1	0	2	1	0	0	25	9
Everton	2018–19	Premier League	5	0	0	0	2	0	—		7	0
Everton	2019–20	Premier League	3	0	0	0	0	0	—		3	0
Everton	Total		35	8	3	0	4	1	0	0	42	9
Everton U23	2016–17	—			—		—		1 (Note: Appearances in EFL Trophy)	0	1	0
Hull City (loan)	2016–17	Premier League	17	4	1	0	1	1	—		19	5
Cardiff City (loan)	2018–19	Premier League	13	0	0	0	0	0	—		13	0
Everton U23	2019–20	—			—		—		2	2	2	2
Burton Albion	2021–22	League One	12	3	0	0	0	0	0	0	12	3
Career total			139	39	16	5	5	2	12	7	172	53

=== International ===
As of match played 11 June 2018

Appearances and goals by national team and year
National team	Year	Apps	Goals
Senegal	2013	4	0
Senegal	2014	1	2
Senegal	2015	1	0
Senegal	2016	2	1
Senegal	2017	0	0
Senegal	2018	1	0
Total		9	3

=== International goals ===
Updated to match played 11 June 2018. Senegal score listed first, score column indicates score after each Niasse goal.

International goals by date, venue, opponent, score, result and competition
No.	Date	Venue	Opponent	Score	Result	Competition
1	25 May 2014	Stade de Genève, Geneva, Switzerland	Kosovo	1–1	3–1	Friendly
2	25 May 2014	Stade de Genève, Geneva, Switzerland	Kosovo	2–1	3–1	Friendly
3	26 March 2016	Stade Léopold Sédar Senghor, Dakar, Senegal	Niger	2–0	2–0	2017 Africa Cup of Nations qualification

== Honours ==
US Ouakam

- Senegal Premier League: 2011
- Senegal Second League: 2009

Lokomotiv Moscow

- Russian Cup: 2014–15
