= Central Stadium (Astrakhan) =

Multi-purpose stadium in Astrakhan, Russia

Coordinates: 46°22′55″N 48°03′03″E

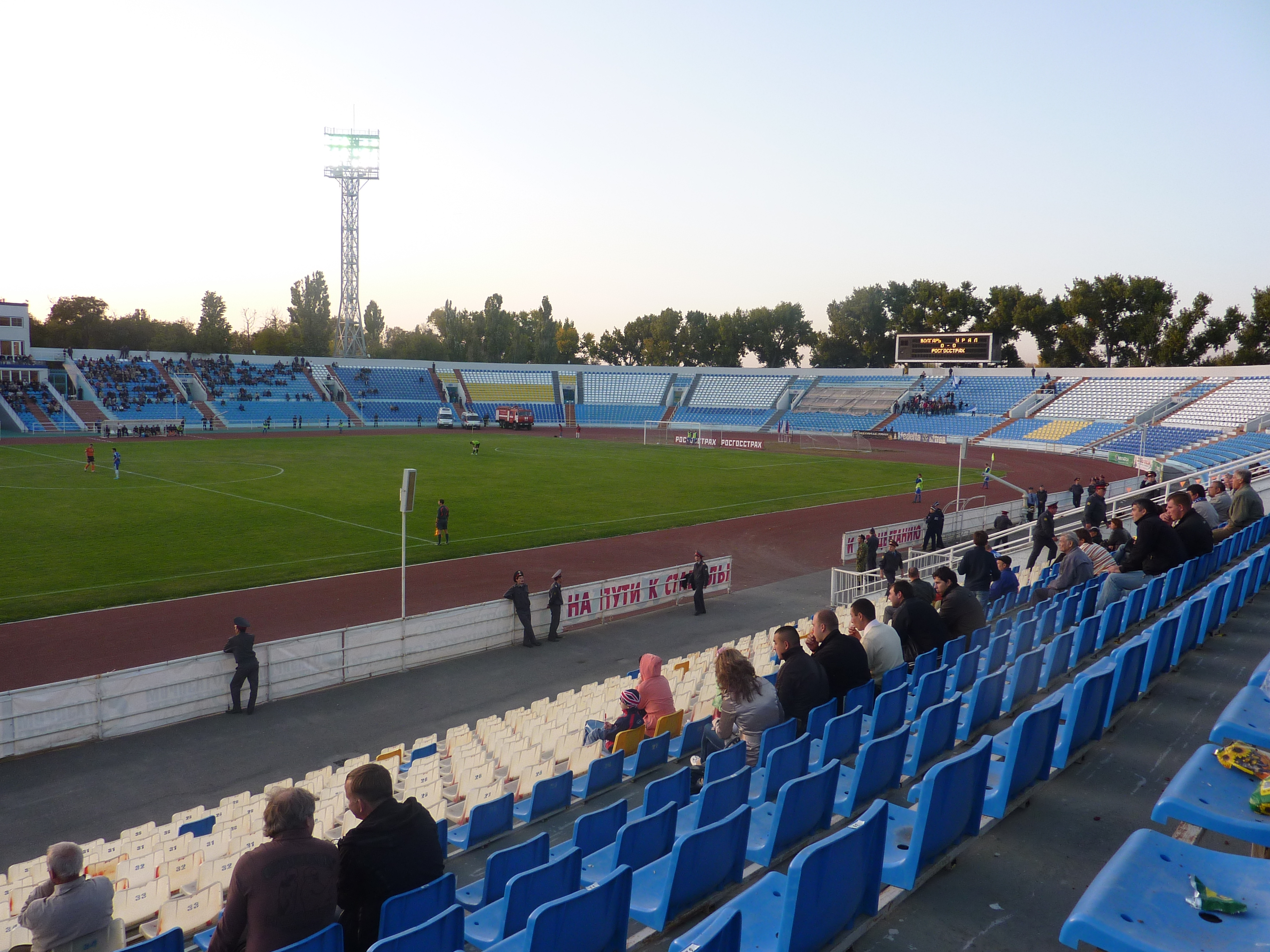
- Interactive map of Central Stadium
- Location: Astrakhan, Russia
- Capacity: 17,727

Construction
- Built: 1955
- Renovated: 2013

Tenants
- Volgar Astrakhan; FC Anji Makhachkala (2000)

Central Stadium (Russian: Центральный стадион, Tsentralnyi Stadion) is a multi-purpose stadium in Astrakhan, Russia. It is used mostly for football matches and is the home stadium of Volgar Astrakhan. The stadium holds 21,500 people, all seated.

The territory of the Central Stadium has long been used as a venue for various city and regional celebrations. Gazprom and Lukoil companies arrange their anniversary concerts here. Also, the Central Stadium gained extensive experience in holding large-scale holidays, including the Tatar Sabantuy, which received federal status. Large Astrakhan companies "Elko", "Leader" and others also use the main arena of the city of Astrakhan to draw their prizes.

The venue hosted 2015 Russian Cup Final between Lokomotiv Moscow and Kuban Krasnodar. This was the first time Central Stadium had been chosen to host Russian Cup final.
