= Vedran Ćorluka =

Croatian footballer (born 1986)

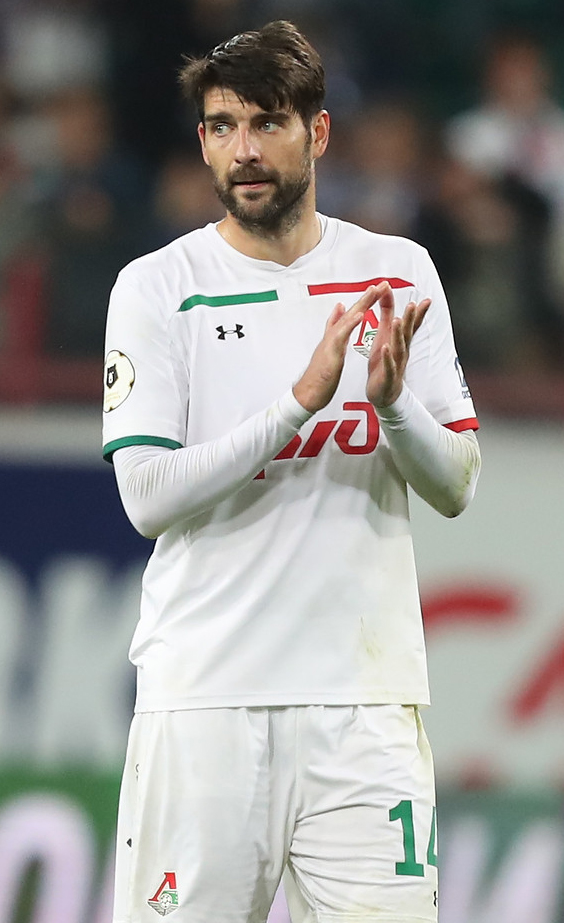
- Ćorluka with Lokomotiv Moscow in 2018

Personal information
- Full name: Vedran Ćorluka
- Date of birth: 5 February 1986 (age 40)
- Place of birth: Derventa, SR Bosnia and Herzegovina, Yugoslavia
- Height: 1.92 m (6 ft 4 in)
- Positions: Centre-back; right-back

Team information
- Current team: United Arab Emirates (assistant coach)

Youth career
- Dinamo Zagreb

Senior career*
Years	Team	Apps	(Gls)
2003–2007	Dinamo Zagreb	61	(7)
2004–2005	→ Inter Zaprešić (loan)	27	(4)
2007–2008	Manchester City	38	(1)
2008–2012	Tottenham Hotspur	81	(1)
2012	→ Bayer Leverkusen (loan)	7	(0)
2012–2021	Lokomotiv Moscow	200	(7)
Total		414	(20)

International career
2002	Croatia U16	7	(2)
2002–2003	Croatia U17	11	(2)
2003	Croatia U18	3	(0)
2004–2005	Croatia U19	12	(4)
2005–2006	Croatia U21	9	(0)
2006–2018	Croatia	103	(4)

Managerial career
- 2021–2026: Croatia (assistant)
- 2021: Lokomotiv Moscow (assistant)
- 2026–: United Arab Emirates (assistant)
Medal record
Men's football
Representing Croatia
FIFA World Cup
Runner-up	2018 Russia
Representing Croatia (assistant coach)
FIFA World Cup
Third place	2022 Qatar
- * Club domestic league appearances and goals

Vedran Ćorluka (Croatian pronunciation: [ʋědran tɕǒrluka]; born 5 February 1986) is a Croatian football coach and former player who played as a centre-back or right-back. He is an assistant to Zlatko Dalić in the United Arab Emirates national team.

Ćorluka graduated from the Dinamo Zagreb Youth Academy, before making his professional debut for the senior team in 2003. In 2007, he made a £8 million move to Premier League club Manchester City, and after a season moved on to Tottenham Hotspur. He spent four seasons there before joining Lokomotiv Moscow in 2012. He won six domestic titles with the club, and after nine seasons with Lokomotiv, he retired from professional football in 2021.

As a Croatia international, Ćorluka earned 103 caps for the country, making him one of the nation's most capped players. He represented Croatia at various youth levels before making his senior debut for the Croatia national team in August 2006, in a friendly match against Italy. He was part of the country's squad at the UEFA European Championships in 2008, 2012, 2016 and at the FIFA World Cups in 2014 and 2018, reaching runners-up at the latter tournament. In August 2018, Ćorluka confirmed his retirement from international football.

== Club career ==
=== Early days ===
Ćorluka was born in Derventa, SR Bosnia and Herzegovina, SFR Yugoslavia. His parents, Jozo and Anđa, come from Modran, a village near Derventa. He has an older brother Hrvoje. Due to the Bosnian War, in 1992 the family moved to Zagreb, where his father still works as an engineer in addition to being Ćorluka's manager. His mother is a judge. Vedran has one brother. Ćorluka began playing football in Dinamo Zagreb's youth teams when he was eight years old, impressing many scouts from the youth academy.

His professional career began in 2003, but during that season he made no appearance for the first team. He was sent on a one-year loan to Inter Zaprešić, helping the team place second in the league, before returning to Dinamo in 2005. After establishing himself as a key player for Dinamo, he helped the club win the Croatian First League title three seasons in a row from 2005 to 2006. He also played a dominant part in his side capturing the Croatian Cup in the 2006 season.

=== Manchester City ===
After consistently strong performances, Ćorluka was signed by English Premier League side Manchester City on 2 August 2007. City did not reveal the fee, though Croatian media reports suggested the deal was worth around £8 million, with the 21-year-old penning a five-year deal.

As usual, Ćorluka consistently found a starting spot for his side in the Premier League. Despite a nightmare blunder during his side's shocking 6–0 defeat to Chelsea at Stamford Bridge, he remained strong during his first season in England as his side finished ninth in the league and gained entry to a UEFA Cup qualifying round via the UEFA fair play ranking. On few rare occasions, he was also used as a defensive midfielder during the season, proving to be a factor for opposing attackers.

Ćorluka scored his first goal in the 4–2 loss at Aston Villa on the opening weekend of the 2008–09 season. In the UEFA Cup second qualifying round match second leg, Ćorluka scored the decisive spot kick in the dramatic 4–2 penalty shoot-out victory over Danish minnows Midtjylland after the tie had ended 1–1 on aggregate. He played his last match for City against Sunderland on 31 August 2008, throwing his shirt into the crowd at the end of the match.

=== Tottenham Hotspur ===
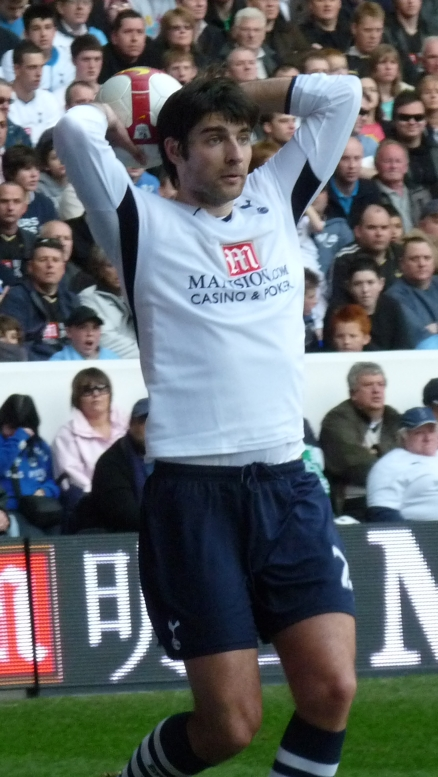
Ćorluka taking a throw-in for Tottenham Hotspur

On 1 September 2008, it was announced that Ćorluka had signed for Tottenham Hotspur for a fee of £8.5 million on a six-year contract, joining his fellow Croatian international and best friend Luka Modrić at the club. During the match against Stoke City on 19 October, Ćorluka was severely injured; kneed under his chin by teammate Heurelho Gomes, he was immediately knocked unconscious. After ten minutes of on-field treatment, he was rushed to hospital where it was announced no serious damage was evident. In the League Cup final on 1 March 2009, Ćorluka scored his and Tottenham's only penalty in the shootout loss to Manchester United, receiving a runners up medal for his efforts.

Ćorluka scored his first Premier League goal for Spurs during a 2–2 draw against Bolton Wanderers on 3 October 2009. On 2 February 2011, he started and played the full 90 minutes at right-back ahead of the injured Alan Hutton in the 1–0 victory over Blackburn Rovers at Ewood Park.

==== Bayer Leverkusen (loan) ====
In the January 2012 transfer window, Ćorluka signed on loan for German Bundesliga club Bayer Leverkusen for the remainder of the 2011–12 season on 31 January, with the option to buy out his contract in the summer transfer window.

Ćorluka made his debut for the club in a 2–2 home draw against VfB Stuttgart at the BayArena on 4 February, playing the full 90 minutes. In his only Champions League appearance for the club, Ćorluka provided the cross for Michal Kadlec's leveler in the 52nd minute in a 3–1 loss to Barcelona. On 25 February, the defender provided an assist for the first of Lars Bender's brace in the 2–0 win over 1. FC Köln.

=== Lokomotiv Moscow and retirement ===
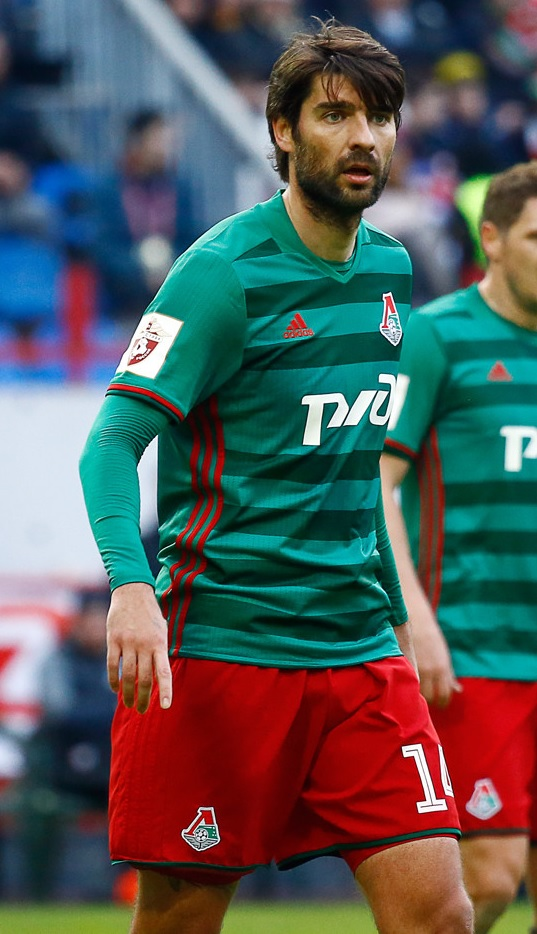
Ćorluka with Lokomotiv Moscow in 2017

On 27 June 2012, Lokomotiv Moscow announced the signing of Ćorluka from Tottenham for £5.5 million. The signing came in light of recent naming of former Croatia national team Slaven Bilić as the manager of Lokomotiv. Ćorluka signed a three-year contract following the successful completion of his medical examination. At Lokomotiv, he also reunited with Roman Pavlyuchenko, with whom he had previously played for Tottenham Hotspur from September 2008 until January 2012. He scored on his debut against newly promoted Mordovia Saransk in a 3–2 victory. In September 2012, March 2014, and December 2014 Ćorluka won the monthly poll among Loko supporters in the social networks and was named the best club player of the month. In June 2015, after Ćorluka helped Lokomotiv to win Russian Cup, fans named him team's Player of the Year.

On 1 April 2021, Ćorluka announced his departure from the club at the end of the season. He played his last game for Lokomotiv in a 1–0 victory over Ural Yekaterinburg, retiring from football after.

== International career ==
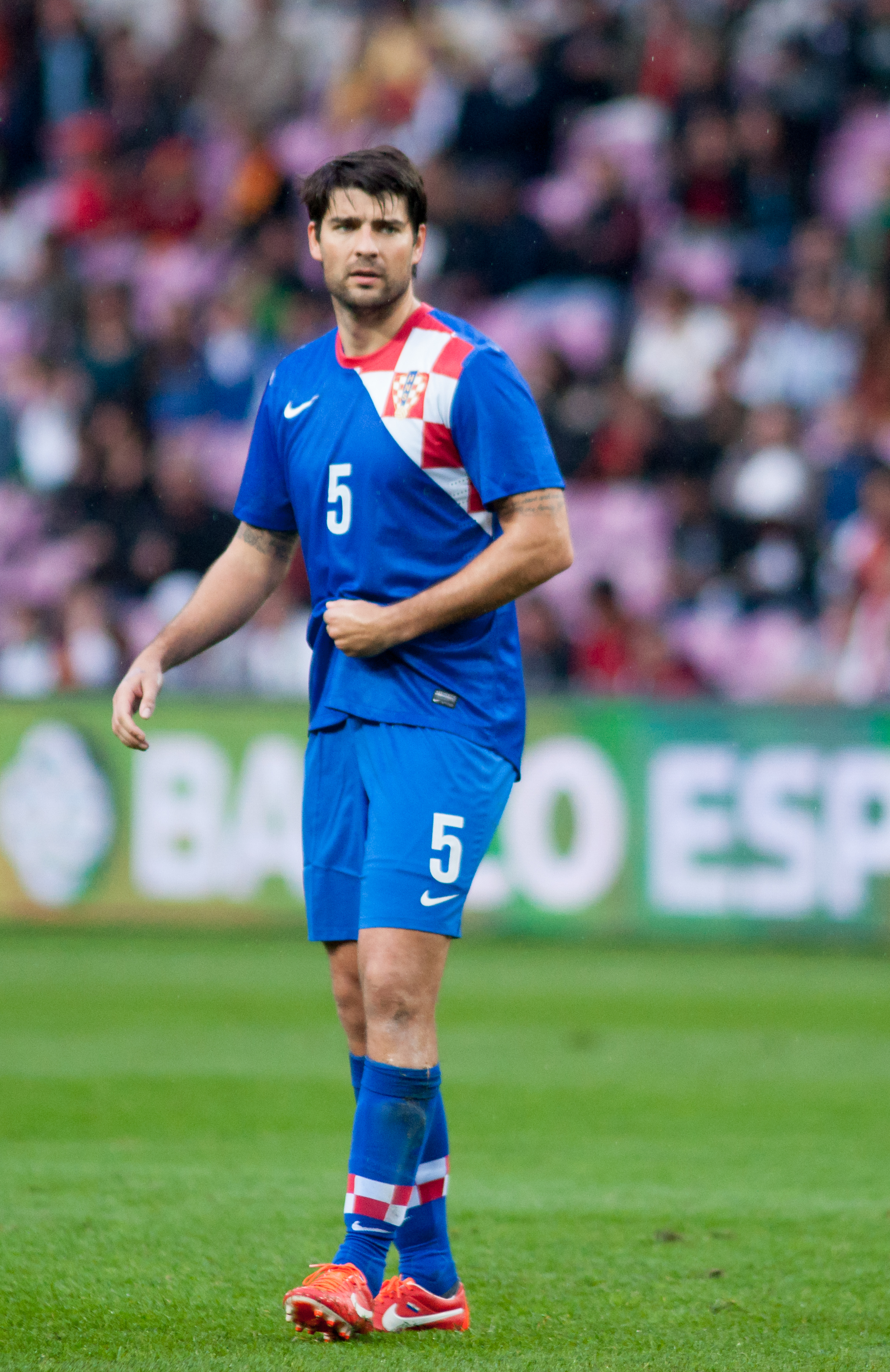
Ćorluka playing for Croatia in 2013

He started to play for the Croatia under-21 team and eventually progressed to his country's national team, for which he soon made his debut in the friendly match against world champions Italy on 16 August 2006 in Livorno. Croatia won the match 2–0 and Ćorluka, aged 20 during his debut, entered the game in the second half and satisfied critics with his very good, solid performance against experienced Serie A forwards. During Croatia's UEFA Euro 2008 qualifying campaign, he became one of the key players under head coach Slaven Bilić. Croatia finished first in Group E, notably ahead of Russia and favourites England, who eventually failed to qualify from the group. Ćorluka was in the final match of the tournament where Croatia's exit came against Turkey in extra time and penalties. Turkey winger Arda Turan revealed in an interview with UEFA that Ćorluka is the most difficult right-back he has ever played against, whom he came up against during this match. He was included for the preliminary squad for UEFA Euro 2012 in Poland and Ukraine after impressive performances in his loan spell at Bayer Leverkusen.

Ćorluka was included in Croatia's squad for the 2018 FIFA World Cup in Russia. On 21 June, he came on as an added-time substitute for Mario Mandžukić in a 3–0 group stage win over Argentina at the Nizhny Novgorod Stadium, earning his 100th cap.

On 10 August 2018, Ćorluka retired from international football, confirming his retirement via social media.

== Managerial career ==
On 17 May 2021, Ćorluka was officially presented as Zlatko Dalić's assistant for the upcoming UEFA Euro 2020, succeeding Ivica Olić. At the press conference, Ćorluka expressed his wish to enroll in a coaching academy after the tournament.

On 6 July 2021, he returned to Lokomotiv Moscow, also as an assistant coach, while still remaining the assistant coach of Croatia. On 19 July, he left Lokomotiv due to family reasons.

== Personal life ==
Ćorluka married his long-time girlfriend, Croatian singer Franka Batelić on 21 July 2018.

On 5 January 2020, Ćorluka and Batelić became parents of a baby boy they named Viktor.

== Career statistics ==
=== Club ===
Club	Season	League			National Cup		League Cup		Europe		Other		Total	
Club	Season	Division	Apps	Goals	Apps	Goals	Apps	Goals	Apps	Goals	Apps	Goals	Apps	Goals
Inter Zaprešić (loan)	2004–05	Prva HNL	27	4	0	0	—		—		—		27	4
Dinamo Zagreb	2005–06	Prva HNL	31	3	2	1	—		—		—		33	4
Dinamo Zagreb	2006–07	Prva HNL	30	4	8	0	—		6	0	1	0	45	4
Dinamo Zagreb	2007–08	Prva HNL	0	0	0	0	—		1	0	—		1	0
Dinamo Zagreb	Total		61	7	10	1	0	0	7	0	1	0	79	8
Manchester City	2007–08	Premier League	35	0	3	0	3	0	—		—		41	0
Manchester City	2008–09	Premier League	3	1	0	0	0	0	3	0	—		6	1
Manchester City	Total		38	1	3	0	3	0	3	0	0	0	47	1
Tottenham Hotspur	2008–09	Premier League	34	0	2	0	5	0	0	0	—		41	0
Tottenham Hotspur	2009–10	Premier League	29	1	5	0	2	0	—		—		36	1
Tottenham Hotspur	2010–11	Premier League	15	0	1	0	0	0	8	0	—		24	0
Tottenham Hotspur	2011–12	Premier League	3	0	0	0	1	0	4	0	—		8	0
Tottenham Hotspur	Total		81	1	8	0	8	0	12	0	0	0	109	1
Bayer Leverkusen (loan)	2011–12	Bundesliga	7	0	0	0	—		1	0	—		8	0
Lokomotiv Moscow	2012–13	Russian Premier League	27	1	1	0	—		—		—		28	1
Lokomotiv Moscow	2013–14	Russian Premier League	28	1	0	0	—		—		—		28	1
Lokomotiv Moscow	2014–15	Russian Premier League	26	2	4	0	—		2	0	—		32	2
Lokomotiv Moscow	2015–16	Russian Premier League	24	3	0	0	—		4	0	1	0	29	3
Lokomotiv Moscow	2016–17	Russian Premier League	19	0	2	0	—		—		—		21	0
Lokomotiv Moscow	2017–18	Russian Premier League	6	0	0	0	—		2	0	0	0	8	0
Lokomotiv Moscow	2018–19	Russian Premier League	21	0	5	1	—		3	0	1	0	30	1
Lokomotiv Moscow	2019–20	Russian Premier League	27	0	0	0	—		6	0	1	0	34	0
Lokomotiv Moscow	2020–21	Russian Premier League	22	0	4	0	–		5	0	1	1	32	1
Lokomotiv Moscow	Total		200	7	16	1	0	0	22	0	4	1	242	9
Career total			414	20	37	2	11	0	45	0	5	1	512	23

=== International ===
Appearances and goals by national team and year

National team	Year	Apps	Goals
Croatia
Croatia	2006	5	0
Croatia	2007	11	0
Croatia	2008	13	0
Croatia	2009	7	1
Croatia	2010	6	0
Croatia	2011	10	1
Croatia	2012	8	2
Croatia	2013	10	0
Croatia	2014	10	0
Croatia	2015	5	0
Croatia	2016	10	0
Croatia	2017	0	0
Croatia	2018	8	0
Total		103	4

International goals

Scores and results list Croatia's goal tally first

No.	Date	Venue	Cap	Opponent	Score	Result	Competition
1	8 October 2009	Stadion Kantrida, Rijeka, Croatia	35	Qatar	1–0	3–2	Friendly
2	11 November 2011	Türk Telekom Arena, Istanbul, Turkey	52	Turkey	3–0	3–0	UEFA Euro 2012 qualifying
3	25 May 2012	Stadion Aldo Drosina, Pula, Croatia	54	Estonia	1–0	3–1	Friendly
4	12 October 2012	Philip II Arena, Skopje, Macedonia	60	Macedonia	1–1	2–1	2014 FIFA World Cup qualification

== Honours ==
Dinamo Zagreb

- Prva HNL: 2005–06, 2006–07
- Croatian Cup: 2006–07
- Croatian Super Cup: 2006

Tottenham Hotspur

- Football League Cup runner-up: 2008–09

Lokomotiv Moscow

- Russian Premier League: 2017–18
- Russian Cup: 2014–15, 2016–17, 2018–19, 2020–21
- Russian Super Cup: 2019

Croatia

- FIFA World Cup runner-up: 2018

Individual

- Lokomotiv Moscow Player of the Year by club supporters: 2015
- Vatrena krila heart of the supporters Award: 2016
- Russian Premier League Centre-back of the Season: 2020–21

Orders

- Order of Duke Branimir: 2018

== See also ==
- List of men's footballers with 100 or more international caps
