= Daniil Chalov =

Russian footballer (born 1994)

Personal information
- Full name: Daniil Nikolayevich Chalov
- Date of birth: 17 June 1994 (age 32)
- Place of birth: Moscow, Russia
- Height: 1.89 m (6 ft 2 in)
- Position: Right back

Youth career
- Lokomotiv Moscow
- Domodedovo-2 Moscow

Senior career*
Years	Team	Apps	(Gls)
2014–2015	SKA-Energiya Khabarovsk	21	(1)
2015–2016	Tom Tomsk	7	(0)
2016–2017	Mordovia Saransk	19	(1)
2017–2018	Shinnik Yaroslavl	4	(0)
2019–2020	Vitebsk	53	(1)
2021	Inđija	4	(0)

International career
2015	Russia U21	1	(0)
- * Club domestic league appearances and goals

Daniil Nikolayevich Chalov (Russian: Даниил Николаевич Чалов; born 17 June 1994) is a Russian former football defender.

== Club career ==
He made his professional debut in the Russian Football National League for FC SKA-Energiya Khabarovsk on 6 July 2014 in a game against FC Luch-Energiya Vladivostok.

After his spell in Belarus, his next destination was Serbia, where he signed on January 28, 2021, a 2-years contract with FK Inđija.

== Personal life ==
He is the older brother of Fyodor Chalov.
