= Timur Koblov =

Russian footballer

Personal information
- Full name: Timur Maratovich Koblov
- Date of birth: 25 January 1997 (age 29)
- Place of birth: Vladikavkaz, Russia
- Height: 1.78 m (5 ft 10 in)
- Position: Midfielder

Youth career
- –2013: Konoplyov football academy
- 2013–2014: FC Lokomotiv Moscow

Senior career*
Years	Team	Apps	(Gls)
2014–2016	Rubin Kazan	0	(0)
2017	Lada-Togliatti	8	(0)
2019	Milsami Orhei	7	(0)
2021–2022	Kaganat	4	(0)
2022	Elektron Veliky Novgorod	14	(0)

International career
2012	Russia U-15	2	(0)
2013	Russia U-16	7	(0)
2013–2014	Russia U-17	11	(1)
- * Club domestic league appearances and goals

Timur Maratovich Koblov (Russian: Тимур Маратович Коблов; born 25 January 1997) is a Russian former football player.

== Club career ==
He made his debut in the Russian Professional Football League for FC Lada-Togliatti on 3 August 2017 in a game against FC Orenburg-2.
