= Aleksandr Seraskhov =

Russian footballer

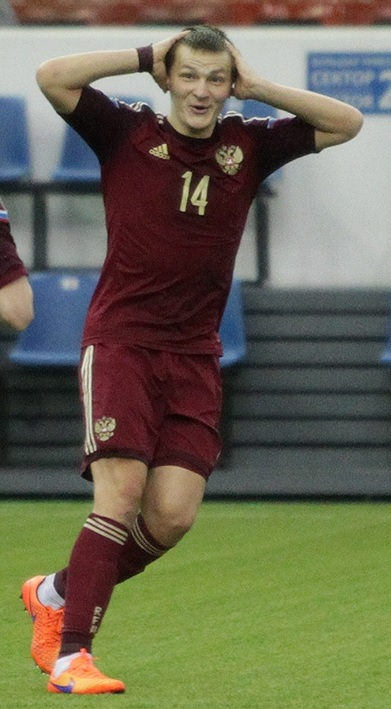
- Seraskhov with Russia U-21 in 2016

Personal information
- Full name: Aleksandr Andreyevich Seraskhov
- Date of birth: 5 February 1994 (age 32)
- Place of birth: Moscow, Russia
- Height: 1.74 m (5 ft 9 in)
- Position: Defender

Team information
- Current team: FC Luki-Energiya Velikiye Luki
- Number: 2

Youth career
- DYuSSh Krasny Oktyabr Moscow
- 2008–2014: FC Lokomotiv Moscow

Senior career*
Years	Team	Apps	(Gls)
2014–2016	FC Lokomotiv Moscow	0	(0)
2015–2016	→ FC Sokol Saratov (loan)	26	(0)
2017–2018	FSC Dolgoprudny	34	(1)
2019–2020	FC Novosibirsk	12	(2)
2020–2021	FC KAMAZ Naberezhnye Chelny	6	(0)
2021	FC Tom Tomsk	10	(0)
2022–2024	FC Spartak Kostroma	61	(0)
2025	FC Saturn Ramenskoye	20	(0)
2026–	FC Luki-Energiya Velikiye Luki	24	(1)

International career^{‡}
2011	Russia U-17	7	(0)
2011–2012	Russia U-18	4	(1)
2012–2013	Russia U-19	10	(0)
2012–2016	Russia U-21	7	(0)
- * Club domestic league appearances and goals as of 1 November 2026 ‡ National team caps and goals as of 23 January 2016

Aleksandr Andreyevich Seraskhov (Russian: Александр Андреевич Серасхов; born 5 February 1994) is a Russian football player who plays for FC Luki-Energiya Velikiye Luki.

== Club career ==
He made his debut in the Russian Football National League for FC Sokol Saratov on 14 March 2015 in a game against FC Sakhalin Yuzhno-Sakhalinsk.

He played for FC Lokomotiv Moscow in the 2014–15 UEFA Europa League play-off round game against Apollon Limassol.
