= 2011–12 FC Krasnodar season =

FC Krasnodar
2011–12 season
- Chairman: Sergey Galitsky
- Manager: Slavoljub Muslin
- Stadium: Kuban Stadium
- Russian Premier League: 9th
- 2010–11 Russian Cup: Quarterfinals by Spartak Moscow
- 2011–12 Russian Cup: Round of 32 by Fakel Voronezh
- Top goalscorer: League: Yura Movsisyan (14); All: Yura Movsisyan (14)
Home colours	Away colours	Third colours

The 2011–12 FC Krasnodar season was the club's 1st season in the Russian Premier League, the highest tier of football in Russia. They finished the season in 9th place. The 2011–12 in Russian football season stretched over 18 months and featured games from both the 2010–11 and 2011–12 Russian Cup, Krasnodar were eliminated at the Quarterfinal stage by Spartak Moscow in the 2010–11 competition and at the Round of 32 stage by Fakel Voronezh in the 2011–12.

== Squad ==
As of match played 13 May 2012

Number	Name	Nationality	Position	Date of birth (Age (Note: Age as of the end of the season))	Signed from	Signed in	Contract ends	Apps.	Goals
Goalkeepers
1	Yevgeni Gorodov	(Russia)	GK	13 December 1985 (aged 26)	Tom Tomsk	2011		26	0
18	Igor Usminskiy	(Russia)	GK	23 April 1977 (aged 35)	Amkar Perm	2011		10	0
29	Nukri Revishvili	(Georgia (country))	GK	2 March 1987 (aged 25)	Anzhi Makhachkala	2012		11	0
Defenders
2	Nikolay Markov	(Uzbekistan)	DF	20 April 1985 (aged 27)	Salyut Belgorod	2010		51	1
3	Dušan Anđelković	(Serbia)	DF	15 June 1982 (aged 29)	Rostov	2011		43	0
4	Alyaksandr Martynovich	(Belarus)	DF	26 August 1987 (aged 24)	Dinamo Minsk	2010		40	1
5	Aleksandre Amisulashvili	(Georgia (country))	DF	20 August 1982 (aged 29)	Kayserispor	2011		40	1
15	Ognjen Vranješ	(Bosnia and Herzegovina)	DF	27 October 1989 (aged 22)	Red Star Belgrade	2011		31	0
55	Nemanja Tubić	(Serbia)	DF	8 April 1984 (aged 28)	Karpaty Lviv	2011		37	1
Midfielders
14	Vladimir Tatarchuk	(Russia)	MF	20 September 1987 (aged 24)	CSKA Moscow	2008			
17	Pavel Golyshev	(Russia)	MF	7 July 1987 (aged 24)	Tom Tomsk	2012		10	2
18	Aleksandr Yerokhin	(Russia)	MF	13 October 1989 (aged 22)	Sheriff Tiraspol	2011		19	2
20	Igor Lambarschi	(Moldova)	MF	26 November 1992 (aged 19)	Academia UTM	2012		11	1
21	Oleg Samsonov	(Russia)	MF	7 September 1987 (aged 24)	Krylia Sovetov	2011		17	1
22	Joãozinho	(Brazil)	MF	25 December 1988 (aged 23)	Levski Sofia	2011		41	7
23	Andrei Mikheyev	(Russia)	MF	1 July 1987 (aged 24)	Taganrog	2009			
24	Alyaksandr Kulchy	(Belarus)	MF	1 November 1973 (aged 38)	Rostov	2011		31	1
25	Yevgeni Shipitsin	(Russia)	MF	16 January 1985 (aged 27)	Salyut Belgorod	2010		41	8
26	Márcio Abreu	(Portugal)	MF	25 April 1980 (aged 32)	Chernomorets Burgas	2011		39	5
31	Valeriu Ciupercă	(Moldova)	MF	12 June 1992 (aged 19)	Academia UTM	2012		1	0
84	Nikola Drinčić	(Montenegro)	MF	7 September 1984 (aged 27)	Spartak Moscow	2011		42	2
Forwards
7	Otar Martsvaladze	(Georgia (country))	FW	14 July 1984 (aged 27)	Volga Nizhny Novgorod	2011		22	3
9	Igor Picușceac	(Moldova)	FW	27 March 1983 (aged 29)	Sheriff Tiraspol	2009			
10	Yura Movsisyan	(Armenia)	FW	2 August 1987 (aged 24)	Randers	2011		38	14
Away on loan
16	Denis Pchelintsev	(Russia)	GK	1 December 1979 (aged 32)	Nosta Novotroitsk	2009			
	Yevgeni Chernyshov	(Russia)	MF	12 March 1994 (aged 18)	Saturn-2	2011		0	0
	Azim Fatullayev	(Russia)	MF	7 June 1986 (aged 25)	Sudostroitel Astrakhan	2008			
	Andrei Gorbanets	(Russia)	MF	24 August 1985 (aged 26)	Rubin Kazan	2011		1	0
	Denis Dorozhkin	(Russia)	FW	8 June 1987 (aged 24)	Academy	2008			
	Aleksandr Yarkin	(Russia)	FW	29 December 1986 (aged 25)	Rubin Kazan	2010		25	5
Players who left during the season
6	Dmitri Michkov	(Russia)	MF	22 January 1980 (aged 32)	Tom Tomsk	2010		0	0
7	Andrei Pazin	(Russia)	MF	20 January 1986 (aged 26)	Nosta Novotroitsk	2010		39	6
11	Spartak Gogniyev	(Russia)	FW	19 January 1981 (aged 31)	KAMAZ	2010		33	6
13	Fyodor Kudryashov	(Russia)	DF	5 April 1987 (aged 25)	loan from Spartak Moscow	2011		9	0
17	Artyom Yankovskiy	(Russia)	DF	26 June 1992 (aged 19)	Krasnodar-2000	2011		0	0
21	Mikhail Komkov	(Russia)	MF	1 October 1984 (aged 27)	KAMAZ	2010		37	8
26	Ivan Knežević	(Montenegro)	FW	22 February 1986 (aged 26)	Zeta	2010		17	1
27	Ilya Mironov	(Russia)	MF	27 February 1992 (aged 20)	Lokomotiv Moscow	2011		0	0
28	Roman Vorobyov	(Russia)	MF	24 March 1984 (aged 28)	Saturn	2011		11	0
28	Ivan Novović	(Montenegro)	DF	26 April 1989 (aged 23)	Zeta	2010		1	0
29	Artyom Beketov	(Russia)	MF	12 June 1984 (aged 27)	Salyut Belgorod	2010		0	0
31	Artur Adamyan	(Russia)	MF	22 April 1992 (aged 20)	Dnepr Smolensk	2011		0	0
32	Aleksei Maslennikov	(Russia)	MF	5 February 1991 (aged 21)	Krasnodar-2000	2011		0	0
34	Nikita Galkin	(Russia)	MF	9 March 1993 (aged 19)	Spartak Moscow	2011		0	0
35	Nikita Galkin	(Russia)	FW	12 April 1991 (aged 21)	Krasnodar-2000	2011		0	0
36	Aleksei Zolotarenko	(Russia)	FW	20 January 1993 (aged 19)	Lokomotiv St.Petersburg	2011		0	0
50	Aleksei Ryabokon	(Russia)	MF	13 February 1993 (aged 19)	Krasnodar-2000	2011		0	0
71	Rui Miguel	(Portugal)	MF	15 November 1983 (aged 28)	Vitória de Guimarães	2011		4	1
94	Maksim Pichugin	(Russia)	MF	26 February 1991 (aged 21)	Krasnodar-2000	2011		0	0
77	Andriano Kokoskeriya	(Russia)	DF	18 April 1994 (aged 18)		2011		0	0

=== Out on loan ===
Note: Flags indicate national team as defined under FIFA eligibility rules; some limited exceptions apply. Players may hold more than one non-FIFA nationality.

No.	Pos.	Nation	Player
16	GK	RUS	Denis Pchelintsev (at Baltika)
—	MF	RUS	Azim Fatullayev (at Yenisey Krasnoyarsk)
—	MF	RUS	Andrei Gorbanets (at Mordovia Saransk)

No.	Pos.	Nation	Player
—	FW	RUS	Denis Dorozhkin (at Chernomorets Novorossiysk)
—	FW	RUS	Aleksandr Yarkin (at SKA-Energiya Khabarovsk)

== Transfers ==
=== Winter 2010–11 ===
In: Note: Flags indicate national team as defined under FIFA eligibility rules; some limited exceptions apply. Players may hold more than one non-FIFA nationality.

No.	Pos.	Nation	Player
1	GK	RUS	Yevgeni Gorodov (from (Russia) Tom Tomsk)
3	DF	SRB	Dušan Anđelković (from (Russia) Rostov)
5	DF	GEO	Aleksandr Amisulashvili (from (Turkey) Kayserispor)
6	MF	RUS	Dmitri Michkov (from (Russia) Tom Tomsk)
8	MF	RUS	Andrei Gorbanets (from (Russia) Rubin Kazan)
10	FW	ARM	Yura Movsisyan (from (Denmark) Randers)
15	DF	BIH	Ognjen Vranješ (from (Serbia) Red Star Belgrade)
17	DF	RUS	Artyom Yankovskiy (from (Russia) Krasnodar-2000)
18	GK	RUS	Igor Usminskiy (from (Russia) Amkar Perm)
19	MF	RUS	Alexandr Erokhin (from (Moldova) Sheriff Tiraspol)
20	MF	RUS	Yakov Zaika (from (Russia) Krasnodar-2000)
22	MF	BRA	Joãozinho (from (Bulgaria) Levski Sofia)
24	MF	BLR	Alyaksandr Kulchy (from (Russia) Rostov)
26	MF	POR	Márcio Abreu (from (Bulgaria) Chernomorets Burgas)
27	MF	RUS	Ilya Mironov (from (Russia) Lokomotiv Moscow)
28	MF	RUS	Roman Vorobyov (from (Russia) Saturn Moscow Oblast)
30	DF	RUS	Konstantin Ryabov (from (Russia) Akademiya Tolyatti)
31	MF	RUS	Artur Adamyan (from (Russia) Dnepr Smolensk)
32	MF	RUS	Aleksei Maslennikov (from (Russia) Krasnodar-2000)
34	MF	RUS	Nikita Galkin
35	FW	RUS	Aleksei Bezglasny (from (Russia) Krasnodar-2000)
36	FW	RUS	Aleksei Zolotarenko
44	DF	RUS	Sergei Khimov (from (Russia) Saturn Moscow Oblast academy)
47	DF	RUS	Frants Guk (from (Russia) Saturn-2 Moscow Oblast)
50	MF	RUS	Aleksei Ryabokon (from (Russia) Krasnodar-2000)
55	DF	SRB	Nemanja Tubić (from (Ukraine) Karpaty Lviv)
58	GK	RUS	Arsen Beglaryan
77	MF	RUS	Andriano Kokoskeriya (from (Russia) Krasnodar-2000)
84	MF	MNE	Nikola Drinčić (from (Russia) Spartak Moscow)
94	DF	RUS	Maksim Pichugin (from (Russia) CSKA Moscow academy)

Out: Note: Flags indicate national team as defined under FIFA eligibility rules; some limited exceptions apply. Players may hold more than one non-FIFA nationality.

No.	Pos.	Nation	Player
1	GK	RUS	Aleksei Botvinyev (end of loan from (Russia) Saturn Moscow Oblast)
3	MF	RUS	Vladimir Leshonok (to (Russia) Yenisey Krasnoyarsk)
5	DF	RUS	Yevgeni Kaleshin (to (Russia) Chernomorets Novorossiysk)
6	DF	RUS	Sergei Tsukanov (to (Russia) Torpedo Vladimir)
8	FW	RUS	Aleksandr Oleinik (to (Russia) Gazovik Orenburg)
10	FW	RUS	Aleksandr Yarkin (on loan to (Russia) SKA-Energiya Khabarovsk)
15	DF	RUS	Yegor Tarakanov (to (Russia) Chernomorets Novorossiysk)
17	MF	RUS	Mikhail Bagayev (to (Russia) Spartak Nalchik)
18	MF	RUS	Azim Fatullayev (on loan to (Russia) Yenisey Krasnoyarsk)
22	MF	RUS	Roman Surnev (to (Russia) Yenisey Krasnoyarsk)
24	DF	RUS	Sergei Miroshnichenko (to (Russia) Khimki)
26	FW	MNE	Ivan Knežević (on loan to (Montenegro) Zeta)
27	DF	UKR	Denys Dedechko (released)
28	DF	MNE	Ivan Novović (on loan to (Montenegro) Zeta)
30	GK	RUS	Aleksandr Perov (released)
—	GK	RUS	Nikolay Moskalenko (released, previously on loan to (Russia) Druzhba Maykop)
—	MF	RUS	Aleksei Arkhipov (to (Russia) Vityaz Podolsk, previously on loan to (Russia) Shinnik Yaroslavl)
—	MF	RUS	Shamil Lakhiyalov (to (Russia) Anzhi Makhachkala, previously with (Russia) Terek Grozny)
—	FW	RUS	Denis Dorozhkin (on loan to (Russia) Chernomorets Novorossiysk, previously on loan to (Russia) Rotor Volgograd)
—	FW	RUS	Nikita Zhdankin (to (Russia) Gazovik Orenburg, previously on loan)

=== Summer 2011 ===
In: Note: Flags indicate national team as defined under FIFA eligibility rules; some limited exceptions apply. Players may hold more than one non-FIFA nationality.

No.	Pos.	Nation	Player
7	FW	GEO	Otar Martsvaladze (from (Russia) Volga Nizhny Novgorod)
13	DF	RUS	Fyodor Kudryashov (on loan from (Russia) Spartak Moscow)
21	MF	RUS	Oleg Samsonov (from (Russia) Krylia Sovetov Samara)
32	MF	RUS	Yevgeni Chernyshov (from (Russia) Saturn-2 Moscow Oblast)
52	DF	RUS	Roman Saunin
54	MF	RUS	Ilya Petrov
56	DF	RUS	Sergei Khmelevskoy
59	MF	RUS	Kirill Morozov
71	MF	POR	Rui Miguel Rodrigues (from (Portugal) Vitória Guimarães)

Out: Note: Flags indicate national team as defined under FIFA eligibility rules; some limited exceptions apply. Players may hold more than one non-FIFA nationality.

No.	Pos.	Nation	Player
6	MF	RUS	Dmitri Michkov (to (Russia) Shinnik Yaroslavl)
7	MF	RUS	Andrei Pazin (to (Russia) Mordovia Saransk)
8	MF	RUS	Andrei Gorbanets (on loan to (Russia) Mordovia Saransk)
21	MF	RUS	Mikhail Komkov (to (Russia) Kuban Krasnodar)
27	MF	RUS	Ilya Mironov (to (Russia) Saturn-2 Moscow Oblast)
28	MF	RUS	Roman Vorobyov (to (Russia) Krylia Sovetov Samara)
29	MF	RUS	Artyom Beketov (to (Russia) Dynamo Bryansk)
32	MF	RUS	Aleksei Maslennikov (released)
50	MF	RUS	Aleksei Ryabokon (to (Russia) Rostov)
—	DF	MNE	Ivan Novović (to (Montenegro) Zeta, previously on loan)
—	FW	MNE	Ivan Knežević (to (Montenegro) Zeta, previously on loan)
—	FW	RUS	Denis Dorozhkin (to (Russia) Torpedo Moscow, previously on loan to (Russia) Chernomorets Novorossiysk)

=== Winter 2011–12 ===
In: Note: Flags indicate national team as defined under FIFA eligibility rules; some limited exceptions apply. Players may hold more than one non-FIFA nationality.

No.	Pos.	Nation	Player
17	MF	RUS	Pavel Golyshev (from (Russia) Tom Tomsk)
20	MF	MDA	Igor Lambarschi (from (Moldova) Academia UTM)
29	GK	GEO	Nukri Revishvili (from (Russia) Anzhi Makhachkala)
31	MF	MDA	Valeriu Ciupercă (from (Moldova) Academia UTM)
33	MF	RUS	Khasan Akhriyev (from (Russia) Zhemchuzhina Sochi)
38	FW	RUS	Maksim Seryogin
40	MF	RUS	Igor Yermakov
49	MF	RUS	Maksim Yermakov
53	MF	RUS	Pavel Marushko
57	DF	RUS	Ramil Zyabirov
61	GK	RUS	Aleksandr Afonin (joined in September 2011, released in January 2012)
62	MF	RUS	Yevgeni Vyalkov
63	FW	RUS	Nikolay Komlichenko
64	DF	RUS	Oleg Logunov
67	DF	RUS	Oleg Mikhaylov
68	MF	RUS	Dmitri Pavlenko
69	DF	RUS	Artur Farion
72	FW	RUS	Aleksey Mayer

Out: Note: Flags indicate national team as defined under FIFA eligibility rules; some limited exceptions apply. Players may hold more than one non-FIFA nationality.

No.	Pos.	Nation	Player
11	FW	RUS	Spartak Gogniyev (to (Russia) Ural Sverdlovsk Oblast)
13	DF	RUS	Fyodor Kudryashov (end of loan from (Russia) Spartak Moscow)
16	GK	RUS	Denis Pchelintsev (on loan to (Russia) Baltika)
17	DF	RUS	Artyom Yankovskiy (to (Russia) Mostovik-Primorye Ussuriysk)
20	MF	RUS	Yakov Zayka (to (Russia) Shinnik Yaroslavl)
31	MF	RUS	Artur Adamyan (released)
32	MF	RUS	Yevgeni Chernyshov (to (Russia) Saturn Moscow Oblast)
34	MF	RUS	Nikita Galkin (to (Russia) Rusichi Oryol)
35	FW	RUS	Aleksei Bezglasny (to (Russia) Slavyansky Slavyansk-na-Kubani)
36	FW	RUS	Aleksei Zolotarenko (to (Russia) Volgar-Gazprom Astrakhan)
61	GK	RUS	Aleksandr Afonin (released)
64	DF	RUS	Oleg Logunov (released)
71	MF	POR	Rui Miguel (to (Romania) Astra Ploiești)
77	MF	RUS	Andriano Kokoskeriya (released)
94	DF	RUS	Maksim Pichugin (to (Russia) MITOS Novocherkassk)

== Competitions ==
=== Russian Premier League ===
==== Matches ====
12 March 2011 1	Anzhi Makhachkala	0–0	Krasnodar	Makhachkala
15:00 MSK (UTC+4)		Summary		Stadium: Dynamo Stadium; Attendance: 13,500; Referee: Vladimir Pettay

19 March 2011 2	Krasnodar	2–0	Spartak Nalchik	Krasnodar
15:00 MSK (UTC+4)	Picușceac 34'; Movsisyan 70'	Summary		Stadium: Kuban Stadium; Attendance: 4,500; Referee: Igor Egorov

3 April 2011 3	CSKA Moscow	1–1	Krasnodar	Moscow
18:30 MSK (UTC+4)	Necid 20'	Summary	Picuşceac 52'	Stadium: Arena Khimki; Attendance: 9,607; Referee: Vladimir Kazmenko

9 April 2011 4	Krasnodar	1–0	Amkar Perm	Krasnodar
16:15 MSK (UTC+4)	Tubić 68'	Summary		Stadium: Kuban Stadium; Attendance: 3,500; Referee: Almir Kayumov

16 April 2011 5	Krylia Sovetov	0–0	Krasnodar	Samara
14:00 MSK (UTC+4)		Summary		Stadium: Metallurg Stadium; Attendance: 11,300; Referee: Aleksandr Egorov

23 April 2011 6	Krasnodar	1–4	Lokomotiv Moscow	Krasnodar
19:30 MSK (UTC+4)	Shipitsin 83'	Report	Shishkin 7'; Ibričić 44' (pen.); Ignatyev 50'; Sychev 75'	Stadium: Kuban Stadium; Attendance: 10,000; Referee: Mikhail Vilkov

1 May 2011 7	Krasnodar	0–0	Zenit St. Petersburg	Krasnodar
16:30 MSK (UTC+4)		Summary		Stadium: Kuban Stadium; Attendance: 15,000; Referee: Aleksey Eskov

8 May 2011 8	Rubin	2–1	Krasnodar	Kazan
18:30 MSK (UTC+4)	Karadeniz 36', 68'	Summary	Sharonov 10' (o.g.)	Stadium: Central Stadium; Attendance: 14,190; Referee: Sergey Karasev

14 May 2011 9	Krasnodar	2–2	Tom Tomsk	Krasnodar
16:15 MSK (UTC+4)	Shipitsin 30'; Picuşceac 30'	Summary	Golyshev 56', 70' (pen.); Sabitov (red card) 61'	Stadium: Kuban Stadium; Attendance: 6,000; Referee: Alexey Nikolaev

21 May 2011 10	Spartak Moscow	4–0	Krasnodar	Moscow
18:30 MSK (UTC+4)	Ari 30', 90+2'; Dzyuba 51', 65'	Summary		Stadium: Luzhniki Stadium; Attendance: 9,231; Referee: Vladimir Pettay

29 May 2011 11	Krasnodar	0–1	Dynamo Moscow	Krasnodar
20:30 MSK (UTC+4)		Summary	Smolov 81'	Stadium: Kuban Stadium; Attendance: 9,000; Referee: Vladislav Bezborodov

10 June 2011 12	Rostov	1–3	Krasnodar	Rostov-on-Don
21:00 MSK (UTC+4)	Kirichenko 15' (pen.)	Summary	Tatarchuk 33'; Movsisyan 46'; Márcio Abreu 53'	Stadium: Olimp – 2 Attendance: 8,000; Referee: Vyacheslav Popov

14 June 2011 13	Krasnodar	4–2	Volga Nizhny Novgorod	Krasnodar
21:00 MSK (UTC+4)	Movsisyan 3'; Kulchy 44'; Joãozinho 61', 73'; Mikheyev (yellow card) 45' (yellow-red card) 69'	Summary	Khazov 16'; Salukvadze 63'	Stadium: Kuban Stadium; Attendance: 5,200; Referee: Yuri Baskakov

18 June 2011 14	Kuban Krasnodar	0–1	Krasnodar	Krasnodar
20:00 MSK (UTC+4)	Armaș (yellow card) 56' (yellow-red card) 88'	Summary	Drinčić 67'; Tubić (red card) 56'	Stadium: Kuban Stadium; Attendance: 25,840; Referee: Stanislav Sukhina

22 June 2011 15	Krasnodar	0–2	Terek Grozny	Krasnodar
21:00 MSK (UTC+4)		Report	Amelyanchuk 18'; Asildarov 83'	Stadium: Kuban Stadium; Attendance: 12,300; Referee: Sergey Lapochkin

26 June 2011 16	Krasnodar	2–2	Anzhi Makhachkala	Krasnodar
21:00 MSK (UTC+4)	Márcio Abreu 61'; Mikheev 68'	Summary	Ivanov 38'; Angbwa 79'	Stadium: Kuban Stadium; Attendance: 10,800; Referee: Vladislav Bezborodov

24 July 2011 17	Spartak Nalchik	2–2	Krasnodar	Nalchik
19:15 MSK (UTC+4)	Kulikov 87'; Goshokov 90+3'	Summary	Shipitsin 64'; Movsisyan 75'	Stadium: Spartak Stadium; Attendance: 10,000; Referee: Sergey Karasev

31 July 2011 18	Krasnodar	1–1	CSKA Moscow	Krasnodar
20:00 MSK (UTC+4)	Mikheyev 60'; Martynovich (yellow card) 34' (yellow-red card) 86'	Summary	Honda 7'; Nababkin (yellow card) 31' (yellow-red card) 72'	Stadium: Kuban Stadium; Attendance: 23,700; Referee: Sergey Lapochkin

7 August 2011 19	Amkar Perm	0–2	Krasnodar	Perm
15:30 MSK (UTC+4)		Summary	Abreu 13'; Drinčić 48'	Stadium: Zvezda Stadium; Attendance: 7,000; Referee: Vladimir Kazmenko

14 August 2011 20	Krasnodar	1–2	Krylia Sovetov	Krasnodar
20:00 MSK (UTC+4)	Martsvaladze 90+3'	Summary	Đorđević 34'; Bobyor 84'	Stadium: Kuban Stadium; Attendance: 6,500; Referee: Maxim Layushkin

21 August 2011 21	Lokomotiv Moscow	1–0	Krasnodar	Moscow
20:45 MSK (UTC+4)	Glushakov 34'	Report		Stadium: Lokomotiv Stadium; Attendance: 10,700; Referee: Igor Egorov

28 August 2011 22	Zenit St. Petersburg	5–0	Krasnodar	Saint Petersburg
16:45 MSK (UTC+4)	Kerzhakov 24', 30', 79' (pen.); Shirokov 85'; Danny 90'	Summary		Stadium: Petrovsky Stadium; Attendance: 21,200; Referee: Vyacheslav Popov

10 September 2011 23	Krasnodar	3–1	Rubin	Krasnodar
19:00 MSK (UTC+4)	Movsisyan 8' (pen.); Amisulashvili 61'; Joãozinho 90+4'	Summary	Natcho 86' (pen.)	Stadium: Kuban Stadium; Attendance: 8,000; Referee: Igor Egorov

17 September 2011 24	Tom Tomsk	0–4	Krasnodar	Tomsk
14:00 MSK (UTC+4)		Summary	Joãozinho 39'; Erokhin 55'; Movsisyan 90+2'; Rui Miguel 90+3'	Stadium: Trud Stadium; Attendance: 8,200; Referee: Timur Arslanbekov

25 September 2011 25	Krasnodar	2–4	Spartak Moscow	Krasnodar
14:00 MSK (UTC+4)	Shipitsin 37', 49'	Summary	Emenike 31'; Dzyuba 36' de Zeeuw 42'; D. Kombarov 73' (pen.)	Stadium: Kuban Stadium; Attendance: 15,000; Referee: Aleksandr Egorov

1 October 2011 26	Dynamo Moscow	2 – 1	Krasnodar	Moscow
18:30 MSK (UTC+4)	Voronin 32', 75'	Summary	Shipitsin 29'	Stadium: Arena Khimki; Attendance: 6,785; Referee: Vitali Meshkov

15 October 2011 27	Krasnodar	2–0	Rostov	Krasnodar
16:15 MSK (UTC+4)	Shipitsin 61'; Joãozinho 57'	Summary		Stadium: Kuban Stadium; Attendance: 6,800; Referee: Maxim Layushkin

22 October 2011 28	Volga Nizhny Novgorod	0–2	Krasnodar	Nizhny Novgorod
14:00 MSK (UTC+4)		Summary	Martsvaladze 59'; Movsisyan 90+1'	Stadium: Lokomotiv Stadium; Attendance: 4,500; Referee: Sergey Kuznetsov

29 October 2011 29	Krasnodar	0–2	Kuban Krasnodar	Krasnodar
18:15 MSK (UTC+4)		Summary	Traoré 41', 86'	Stadium: Kuban Stadium; Attendance: 23,000; Referee: Sergey Karasev

5 November 2011 30	Terek Grozny	1–0	Krasnodar	Grozny
18:30 MSK (UTC+4)	Pavlenko 69'	Report		Stadium: Akhmat-Arena; Attendance: 9,600; Referee: Timur Arslanbekov

==== Table ====
Pos	Team	Pld	W	D	L	GF	GA	GD	Pts	Qualification
7	Rubin Kazan	30	13	10	7	40	27	+13	49	Qualification to Championship group
8	Anzhi Makhachkala	30	13	9	8	38	32	+6	48	Qualification to Championship group
9	Krasnodar	30	10	8	12	38	43	−5	38	Qualification to Relegation group
10	Rostov	30	8	8	14	31	45	−14	32	Qualification to Relegation group
11	Terek Grozny	30	8	7	15	29	45	−16	31	Qualification to Relegation group

Source: Russian Premier League
Rules for classification: 1) points; 2) number of wins; 3) head-to-head points; 4) number of head-to-head wins; 5) head-to-head goal difference; 6) number of head-to-head goals scored; 7) number of head-to-head away goals scored; 8) goal difference; 9) number of goals scored; 10) number of away goals scored.

=== Russian Premier League – Relegation group ===
==== Matches ====
19 November 2011 31	Krasnodar	3–2	Spartak Nalchik	Krasnodar
18:30 MSK (UTC+4)	Movsisyan 8'; Shipitsin 18'; Abreu 79'	Summary	Džudović 41'; Goshokov 56'; Džudović (yellow card) 65' (yellow-red card) 90+1'	Stadium: Kuban Stadium; Attendance: 4,100; Referee: Sergey Lapochkin

27 November 2011 32	Tom Tomsk	0–0	Krasnodar	Tomsk
12:00 MSK (UTC+4)		Summary		Stadium: Trud Stadium; Attendance: 7,500; Referee: Eduard Malyi

5 March 2012 33	Krasnodar	1–0	Rostov	Krasnodar
18:30 MSK (UTC+4)	Golyshev 90'	Summary		Stadium: Kuban Stadium; Attendance: 4,000; Referee: Vitali Meshkov

10 March 2012 34	Krasnodar	1–3	Terek Grozny	Krasnodar
15:00 MSK (UTC+4)	Picușceac 87'	Report	Asildarov 7'; Rybus 21'; Lebedenko 21'	Stadium: Kuban Stadium; Attendance: 5,000; Referee: Almir Kayumov

17 March 2012 35	Volga Nizhny Novgorod	1–2	Krasnodar	Nizhny Novgorod
14:00 MSK (UTC+4)	Bibilov 52'	Summary	Movsisyan 49'; Martynovich 69'	Stadium: Lokomotiv Stadium; Attendance: 2,500; Referee: Stanislav Sukhina

24 March 2012 36	Krasnodar	0–1	Amkar Perm	Krasnodar
18:30 MSK (UTC+4)		Summary	Jakubko 4'	Stadium: Kuban Stadium; Attendance: 2,000; Referee: Sergey Ivanov

31 March 2012 37	Krylia Sovetov	1–1	Krasnodar	Samara
18:30 MSK (UTC+4)	Kornilenko 69'	Summary	Samsonov 37'; Anđelković (yellow card) 90' (yellow-red card) 90+1'	Stadium: Metallurg Stadium; Attendance: 12,300; Referee: Mikhail Vilkov

8 April 2012 38	Krasnodar	3–1	Tom Tomsk	Krasnodar
16:30 MSK (UTC+4)	Golyshev 45'; Martsvaladze 76'; Joãozinho 82'	Summary	Rebko 68' (pen.)	Stadium: Kuban Stadium; Attendance: 4,200; Referee: Sergey Kuznetsov

16 April 2012 39	Rostov	1–1	Krasnodar	Rostov-on-Don
19:00 MSK (UTC+4)	Kirichenko 90+1'	Summary	Movsisyan 74' (pen.)	Stadium: Olimp – 2 Attendance: 6,450; Referee: Timur Arslanbekov

22 April 2012 40	Terek Grozny	0–1	Krasnodar	Grozny
14:00 MSK (UTC+4)		Report	Markov 28'	Stadium: Akhmat-Arena; Attendance: 10,200; Referee: Aleksandr Egorov

27 April 2012 41	Krasnodar	2–1	Volga Nizhny Novgorod	Krasnodar
19:30 MSK (UTC+4)	Movsisyan 4', 45'	Summary	Karyaka 71' (pen.)	Stadium: Kuban Stadium; Attendance: 5,300; Referee: Aleksey Eskov

2 May 2012 42	Amkar Perm	2–2	Krasnodar	Perm
18:00 MSK (UTC+4)	Grishin 39'; Sirakov 90+4'	Summary	Movsisyan 14'; Joãozinho 83'	Stadium: Zvezda Stadium; Attendance: 7,700; Referee: Mikhail Vilkov

7 May 2012 43	Krasnodar	0–2	Krylia Sovetov	Krasnodar
20:30 MSK (UTC+4)		Summary	Bobyor 43'; Taranov 48'	Stadium: Kuban Stadium; Attendance: 11,400; Referee: Maxim Layushkin

13 May 2012 44	Spartak Nalchik	3–3	Krasnodar	Nalchik
MSK (UTC+4)	Kontsedalov 8', 75'; Bolov 14'	Summary	Abreu 11'; Lambarschi 20'; Movsisyan 70' (pen.)	Stadium: Spartak Stadium; Attendance: 2,500; Referee: Almir Kayumov

==== League table ====
Pos	Team	Pld	W	D	L	GF	GA	GD	Pts	Qualification or relegation
9	Krasnodar	44	16	13	15	58	61	−3	61	
10	Amkar Perm	44	14	13	17	40	51	−11	55	
11	Terek Grozny	44	14	10	20	45	62	−17	52	
12	Krylia Sovetov Samara	44	12	15	17	33	50	−17	51	
13	Rostov (O)	44	12	12	20	45	61	−16	48	Qualification to Relegation play-offs
14	Volga Nizhny Novgorod (O)	44	12	5	27	37	60	−23	41	Qualification to Relegation play-offs
15	Tom Tomsk (R)	44	8	13	23	30	70	−40	37	Relegation to Football National League
16	Spartak Nalchik (R)	44	7	13	24	39	60	−21	34	Relegation to Football National League

Source: Russian Premier League
Rules for classification: 1) points; 2) number of wins; 3) head-to-head points; 4) number of head-to-head wins; 5) head-to-head goal difference; 6) number of head-to-head goals scored; 7) number of head-to-head away goals scored; 8) goal difference; 9) number of goals scored; 10) number of away goals scored
(O) Play-off winners; (R) Relegated

=== Russian Cup ===
==== 2010–11 ====
6 March 2011 Round of 16	Amkar Perm	0 – 1 (a.e.t.)	Krasnodar	Perm
17:00 MSK (UTC+4)	Cherenchikov (yellow card) 50'; Ristić (yellow card) 93'; Sirakov (yellow card) 106'; Volkov (yellow card) 110'	Report	Amisulashvili (yellow card) 4'; Kulchy (yellow card) 80'; Picușceac (yellow card) 95' (goal) 98'; Drinčić (yellow card) 113'	Stadium: Zvezda Stadium; Attendance: 8,000; Referee: Yuri Baskakov

20 April 2011 Quarterfinal	Spartak Moscow	2 – 1	Krasnodar	Moscow
19:30 MSK (UTC+4)	Carioca (yellow card) 32'; Makeyev (yellow card) 45+1'; Welliton 58' (pen.); Ari (yellow card) 66'; Sheshukov (yellow card) 67' (yellow-red card) 84'; Rojo 69'	Report	Markov (yellow card) 82'; Gogniyev 85'	Stadium: Luzhniki Stadium; Attendance: 15,911; Referee: Igor Egorov

==== 2011–12 ====
17 July 2011 Round of 32	Fakel Voronezh	2 – 1	Krasnodar	Voronezh
20:00 MSK (UTC+4)	Mikhalyov 13'; Abroskin 24'; Shestakov (yellow card) 28'; Kolesnikov (yellow card) 84'	Report	Martynovich (yellow card) 32'; Vranješ (yellow card) 45'; Yerokhin 55'; Anđelković (yellow card) 76'	Stadium: Tsentralnyi Profsoyuz Stadion; Attendance: 11,300; Referee: Vladimir Rogulev

== Squad statistics ==
As of match played 13 May 2012

=== Appearances and goals ===
No.	Pos	Nat	Player	Total		Premier League		2010-11 Russian Cup		2011-12 Russian Cup	
No.	Pos	Nat	Player	Apps	Goals	Apps	Goals	Apps	Goals	Apps	Goals
1	GK	(Russia) RUS	Yevgeni Gorodov	26	0	23	0	2	0	1	0
2	DF	(Russia) RUS	Nikolay Markov	19	1	13+5	1	1	0	0	0
3	DF	(Serbia) SRB	Dušan Anđelković	43	0	39+1	0	2	0	1	0
4	DF	(Belarus) BLR	Alyaksandr Martynovich	25	1	17+6	1	1	0	1	0
5	DF	(Georgia (country)) GEO	Aleksandre Amisulashvili	40	1	36+1	1	2	0	1	0
7	FW	(Georgia (country)) GEO	Otar Martsvaladze	22	3	9+13	3	0	0	0	0
9	FW	(Moldova) MDA	Igor Picușceac	20	5	11+8	4	1	1	0	0
10	FW	(Armenia) ARM	Yura Movsisyan	38	14	29+8	14	0+1	0	0	0
14	MF	(Russia) RUS	Vladimir Tatarchuk	28	1	22+4	1	1	0	1	0
15	DF	(Bosnia and Herzegovina) BIH	Ognjen Vranješ	31	0	26+3	0	1	0	1	0
17	MF	(Russia) RUS	Pavel Golyshev	10	2	4+6	2	0	0	0	0
18	GK	(Russia) RUS	Igor Usminskiy	10	0	10	0	0	0	0	0
19	MF	(Russia) RUS	Aleksandr Yerokhin	19	2	5+12	1	0+1	0	0+1	1
20	MF	(Moldova) MDA	Igor Lambarschi	11	1	8+3	1	0	0	0	0
21	MF	(Russia) RUS	Oleg Samsonov	17	1	13+4	1	0	0	0	0
22	MF	(Brazil) BRA	Joãozinho	41	7	37+2	7	1	0	1	0
23	MF	(Russia) RUS	Andrei Mikheyev	21	2	8+11	2	1	0	0+1	0
24	MF	(Belarus) BLR	Alyaksandr Kulchy	31	1	17+12	1	1	0	1	0
25	MF	(Russia) RUS	Yevgeni Shipitsin	26	8	16+9	8	1	0	0	0
26	MF	(Portugal) POR	Márcio Abreu	39	5	37	5	1	0	1	0
29	GK	(Georgia (country)) GEO	Nukri Revishvili	11	0	11	0	0	0	0	0
31	MF	(Moldova) MDA	Valeriu Ciupercă	1	0	0+1	0	0	0	0	0
55	DF	(Serbia) SRB	Nemanja Tubić	37	1	35	1	1+1	0	0	0
84	MF	(Montenegro) MNE	Nikola Drinčić	42	2	39	2	2	0	1	0
Players who left Krasnodar on loan during the season:
8	MF	(Russia) RUS	Andrei Gorbanets	1	0	1	0	0	0	0	0
Players who appeared for Krasnodar who left during the season:
7	MF	(Russia) RUS	Andrei Pazin	1	0	0	0	0+1	0	0	0
11	FW	(Russia) RUS	Spartak Gogniyev	15	1	2+11	0	1	1	1	0
13	DF	(Russia) RUS	Fyodor Kudryashov	9	0	8+1	0	0	0	0	0
21	MF	(Russia) RUS	Mikhail Komkov	6	0	1+3	0	1+1	0	0	0
28	MF	(Russia) RUS	Roman Vorobyov	11	0	5+4	0	2+0	0	0	0
71	MF	(Portugal) POR	Rui Miguel	4	1	1+3	1	0	0	0	0

=== Goal scorers ===
Place	Position	Nation	Number	Name	Premier League	2010-11 Russian Cup	2011-12 Russian Cup	Total
1	FW	(Armenia)	10	Yura Movsisyan	14	0	0	14
2	MF	(Russia)	25	Yevgeni Shipitsin	8	0	0	8
3	MF	(Brazil)	22	Joãozinho	7	0	0	7
4	MF	(Portugal)	26	Márcio Abreu	5	0	0	5
4	FW	(Moldova)	9	Igor Picușceac	4	1	0	5
6	FW	(Georgia (country))	7	Otar Martsvaladze	3	0	0	3
7	MF	(Russia)	17	Pavel Golyshev	2	0	0	2
7	MF	(Russia)	23	Andrei Mikheyev	2	0	0	2
7	MF	(Montenegro)	84	Nikola Drinčić	2	0	0	2
7	MF	(Russia)	19	Aleksandr Erokhin	1	0	1	2
11	MF	(Belarus)	24	Alyaksandr Kulchy	1	0	0	1
11	MF	(Russia)	14	Vladimir Tatarchuk	1	0	0	1
11	DF	(Serbia)	55	Nemanja Tubić	1	0	0	1
11	DF	(Belarus)	4	Alyaksandr Martynovich	1	0	0	1
11	DF	(Georgia (country))	5	Aleksandr Amisulashvili	1	0	0	1
11	MF	(Portugal)	71	Rui Miguel	1	0	0	1
11	MF	(Moldova)	20	Igor Lambarschi	1	0	0	1
11	DF	(Russia)	2	Nikolay Markov	1	0	0	1
11	MF	(Russia)	21	Oleg Samsonov	1	0	0	1
11	FW	(Russia)	11	Spartak Gogniyev	0	1	0	1
				TOTALS	58	2	1	61

=== Disciplinary record ===
Number	Nation	Position	Name	Premier League		2010-11 Russian Cup		2011-12 Russian Cup		Total	
Number	Nation	Position	Name	Yellow card	Red card	Yellow card	Red card	Yellow card	Red card	Yellow card	Red card
1	(Russia)	GK	Yevgeni Gorodov	2	0	0	0	0	0	2	0
2	(Russia)	DF	Nikolay Markov	3	0	1	0	0	0	4	0
3	(Serbia)	DF	Dušan Anđelković	10	1	0	0	1	0	11	1
4	(Belarus)	DF	Alyaksandr Martynovich	4	1	0	0	1	0	5	1
5	(Georgia (country))	DF	Aleksandr Amisulashvili	7	0	1	0	0	0	8	0
7	(Georgia (country))	FW	Otar Martsvaladze	2	0	0	0	0	0	2	0
9	(Moldova)	FW	Igor Picuşceac	1	0	1	0	0	0	2	0
10	(Armenia)	FW	Yura Movsisyan	7	0	0	0	0	0	7	0
11	(Russia)	FW	Spartak Gogniyev	1	0	0	0	0	0	1	0
13	(Russia)	DF	Fyodor Kudryashov	2	0	0	0	0	0	2	0
14	(Russia)	MF	Vladimir Tatarchuk	1	0	0	0	0	0	1	0
15	(Bosnia and Herzegovina)	DF	Ognjen Vranješ	7	0	0	0	1	0	8	0
18	(Russia)	GK	Igor Usminskiy	2	0	0	0	0	0	2	0
19	(Russia)	MF	Aleksandr Erokhin	3	0	0	0	0	0	3	0
20	(Moldova)	MF	Igor Lambarschi	1	0	0	0	0	0	1	0
21	(Russia)	MF	Oleg Samsonov	1	0	0	0	0	0	1	0
22	(Brazil)	MF	Joãozinho	5	0	0	0	0	0	5	0
23	(Russia)	MF	Andrei Mikheyev	7	1	0	0	0	0	7	1
24	(Belarus)	MF	Alyaksandr Kulchy	6	0	1	0	0	0	7	0
25	(Russia)	MF	Yevgeni Shipitsin	6	0	0	0	0	0	6	0
26	(Portugal)	MF	Márcio Abreu	6	0	0	0	0	0	6	0
28	(Russia)	MF	Roman Vorobyov	1	0	0	0	0	0	1	0
55	(Serbia)	DF	Nemanja Tubić	6	1	0	0	0	0	6	1
84	(Montenegro)	MF	Nikola Drinčić	12	0	1	0	0	0	13	0
			TOTALS	103	4	5	0	3	0	111	4
