= 2012–13 FC Krasnodar season =

FC Krasnodar
2012–13 season
- Chairman: Sergey Galitsky
- Manager: Slavoljub Muslin
- Stadium: Kuban Stadium
- Russian Premier League: 10th
- Russian Cup: Last 16 vs Kuban Krasnodar
- Top goalscorer: League: Wánderson (13); All: Wánderson (13)
- Highest home attendance: 22,000 vs Spartak Moscow; 18 May 2013
- Lowest home attendance: 4,500 vs Terek Grozny; 19 November 2012
- Average home league attendance: 10,713
Home colours	Away colours	Third colours

The 2012–13 FC Krasnodar season was the club's 2nd successive season in the Russian Premier League, the highest tier of association football in Russia, in which they finished in 10th place. They also took part in the 2012–13 Russian Cup, getting eliminated at the last 16 stage by rivals Kuban Krasnodar.

== Squad ==
As of match played 26 May 2013

Number	Name	Nationality	Position	Date of birth (Age (Note: Age as of the end of the season))	Signed from	Signed in	Contract ends	Apps.	Goals
Goalkeepers
1	Nukri Revishvili	(Georgia (country))	GK	2 March 1987 (aged 26)	Anzhi Makhachkala	2012		16	0
16	Yevgeni Gorodov	(Russia)	GK	13 December 1985 (aged 27)	Tom Tomsk	2011		26	0
23	Aleksandr Filtsov	(Russia)	GK	2 January 1990 (aged 23)	on loan from Lokomotiv Moscow	2013	2013	8	0
51	Denis Kavlinov	(Russia)	GK	10 January 1995 (aged 18)	Academy	2010		0	0
73	Stanislav Antipin	(Russia)	GK	17 February 1995 (aged 18)	Academy	2012		0	0
88	Andrei Sinitsyn	(Russia)	GK	23 June 1988 (aged 24)	Yenisey Krasnoyarsk	2012		16	0
Defenders
2	Nikolay Markov	(Uzbekistan)	DF	20 April 1985 (aged 28)	Salyut Belgorod	2010		66	2
3	Dušan Anđelković	(Serbia)	DF	15 June 1982 (aged 30)	Rostov	2011		65	1
4	Alyaksandr Martynovich	(Belarus)	DF	26 August 1987 (aged 25)	Dinamo Minsk	2010		62	2
6	Ruslan Nakhushev	(Russia)	DF	5 September 1984 (aged 28)	Lokomotiv Moscow	2012		16	0
28	Igor Smolnikov	(Russia)	DF	8 August 1988 (aged 24)	Lokomotiv Moscow	2012		27	0
36	Adolphe Teikeu	(Cameroon)	DF	23 June 1990 (aged 22)	on loan from Metalurh Zaporizhzhia	2013	2013	5	0
48	Aleksandr Marchenko	(Russia)	DF	3 February 1996 (aged 17)	Academy	2013		0	0
55	Nemanja Tubić	(Serbia)	DF	8 April 1984 (aged 29)	Karpaty Lviv	2011		54	1
69	Artur Farion	(Russia)	DF	27 January 1995 (aged 18)	Academy	2011		0	0
86	Vasili Cherov	(Russia)	DF	13 January 1996 (aged 17)	Academy	2012		0	0
Midfielders
7	Vladislav Ignatyev	(Russia)	MF	20 January 1987 (aged 26)	Lokomotiv Moscow	2012		28	1
14	Wánderson	(Brazil)	MF	18 February 1986 (aged 27)	GAIS	2012	2013	24	13
18	Nikola Drinčić	(Montenegro)	MF	7 September 1984 (aged 28)	Spartak Moscow	2011		60	3
20	Igor Lambarschi	(Russia)	MF	26 November 1992 (aged 20)	Academia UTM	2012		19	1
22	Joãozinho	(Brazil)	MF	25 December 1988 (aged 24)	Levski Sofia	2011		72	12
25	Yevgeni Shipitsin	(Russia)	MF	16 January 1985 (aged 28)	Salyut Belgorod	2010		60	13
26	Márcio Abreu	(Portugal)	MF	25 April 1980 (aged 33)	Chernomorets Burgas	2011		68	7
27	Isael	(Brazil)	MF	13 May 1988 (aged 25)	Nacional	2013		8	1
33	Mauricio Pereyra	(Uruguay)	MF	15 March 1990 (aged 23)	Lanús	2013	2016	9	1
35	Oleg Samsonov	(Russia)	MF	7 September 1987 (aged 25)	Krylia Sovetov	2011		17	1
47	Ilya Zhigulyov	(Russia)	MF	1 February 1996 (aged 17)	Academy	2013		0	0
49	Maksim Yermakov	(Russia)	MF	21 April 1995 (aged 18)	Academy	2011		0	0
54	Ilya Petrov	(Russia)	MF	27 June 1995 (aged 17)	Academy	2011		0	0
59	Kirill Morozov	(Russia)	MF	11 April 1995 (aged 18)	Academy	2011		0	0
68	Nika Chkhapeliya	(Russia)	MF	26 April 1994 (aged 19)	Olimpia Gelendzhik	2012		1	0
75	Khasan Akhriyev	(Russia)	MF	3 June 1994 (aged 18)	Zhemchuzhina-Sochi	2012		0	0
76	Aleksandr Ageyev	(Russia)	MF	22 May 1996 (aged 17)	Academy	2013		0	0
77	Vladimir Koman	(Hungary)	MF	16 March 1989 (aged 24)	AS Monaco	2012		28	1
98	Sergei Petrov	(Russia)	MF	2 January 1991 (aged 22)	Krylia Sovetov	2013		9	1
Forwards
11	Moussa Konaté	(Senegal)	FW	3 April 1993 (aged 20)	Maccabi Tel Aviv	2012		12	0
63	Nikolay Komlichenko	(Russia)	FW	29 June 1995 (aged 17)	Academy	2010		0	0
Away on loan
18	Aleksandr Yerokhin	(Russia)	MF	13 October 1989 (aged 23)	Sheriff Tiraspol	2011		22	3
21	Khyzyr Appayev	(Russia)	FW	27 January 1990 (aged 23)	Krylia Sovetov	2012		5	0
31	Valeriu Ciupercă	(Moldova)	MF	12 June 1992 (aged 20)	Academia UTM	2012		1	0
Players who left during the season
5	Aleksandre Amisulashvili	(Georgia (country))	DF	20 August 1982 (aged 30)	Kayserispor	2011		57	1
8	Syarhey Kislyak	(Belarus)	MF	6 August 1987 (aged 25)	on loan from Rubin Kazan	2012	2012	13	0
10	Yura Movsisyan	(Armenia)	FW	2 August 1987 (aged 25)	Randers	2011		52	23
15	Ognjen Vranješ	(Bosnia and Herzegovina)	DF	27 October 1989 (aged 23)	Red Star Belgrade	2011		40	0
17	Pavel Golyshev	(Russia)	MF	7 July 1987 (aged 25)	Tom Tomsk	2012		11	2

=== Out on loan ===
Note: Flags indicate national team as defined under FIFA eligibility rules; some limited exceptions apply. Players may hold more than one non-FIFA nationality.

No.	Pos.	Nation	Player
19	MF	RUS	Aleksandr Yerokhin (at SKA-Energiya Khabarovsk)
21	FW	RUS	Khyzyr Appayev (at Rotor Volgograd)

No.	Pos.	Nation	Player
31	MF	MDA	Valeriu Ciupercă (at Yenisey Krasnoyarsk)

=== Reserve squad ===
The following players were registered with the RFPL and were listed by club's website as reserve players. They are eligible to play for the first team.

Note: Flags indicate national team as defined under FIFA eligibility rules; some limited exceptions apply. Players may hold more than one non-FIFA nationality.

No.	Pos.	Nation	Player
37	DF	RUS	Aleksandr Luzin
38	FW	RUS	Maksim Seryogin
39	MF	RUS	Ilya Borisov
40	MF	RUS	Igor Yermakov
41	MF	RUS	Yevgeni Andriyenko
45	MF	RUS	Marat Garipov
46	DF	ARM	Andrei Gamalyan
52	FW	RUS	Yegor Demidkov
53	MF	RUS	Pavel Marushko
56	DF	RUS	Sergei Khmelevskoy
57	DF	RUS	Ramil Zyabirov

No.	Pos.	Nation	Player
58	MF	RUS	Pavel Kryzhevskikh
61	GK	RUS	Dmitri Goryachkin
62	MF	RUS	Yevgeni Vyalkov
67	DF	RUS	Oleg Mikhaylov
71	DF	RUS	Dmitri Kuzmichyov
72	FW	RUS	Aleksei Mayer
74	GK	RUS	Saveliy Tolstopyatov
78	MF	RUS	Stefan Balabanov
81	DF	RUS	Yevgeni Nesterenko
82	DF	RUS	Nikolai Ogurtsov
83	DF	RUS	Maksim Starkov

== Transfers ==
=== Summer ===
In: Note: Flags indicate national team as defined under FIFA eligibility rules; some limited exceptions apply. Players may hold more than one non-FIFA nationality.

No.	Pos.	Nation	Player
6	DF	RUS	Ruslan Nakhushev (from (Russia) Lokomotiv Moscow, previously on loan to (Russia) Tom Tomsk)
7	MF	RUS	Vladislav Ignatyev (from (Russia) Lokomotiv Moscow)
8	MF	BLR	Syarhey Kislyak (on loan from (Russia) Rubin Kazan)
11	FW	SEN	Pape Moussa Konaté (from (Israel) Maccabi Tel Aviv)
14	FW	BRA	Wánderson do Carmo (on loan from (Sweden) GAIS)
21	FW	RUS	Khyzyr Appayev (from (Russia) Krylia Sovetov Samara)
28	DF	RUS	Igor Smolnikov (from (Russia) Rostov)
77	MF	HUN	Vladimir Koman (from (France) AS Monaco)
88	GK	RUS	Andrei Sinitsyn (from (Russia) Yenisey Krasnoyarsk)

Out: Note: Flags indicate national team as defined under FIFA eligibility rules; some limited exceptions apply. Players may hold more than one non-FIFA nationality.

No.	Pos.	Nation	Player
7	MF	GEO	Otar Martsvaladze (to (Russia) SKA-Energiya Khabarovsk)
9	FW	MDA	Igor Picuşceac (to (Russia) Amkar Perm)
14	MF	RUS	Vladimir Tatarchuk (to (Russia) Spartak Nalchik)
23	MF	RUS	Andrei Mikheyev (to (Russia) Ufa)
24	MF	BLR	Alyaksandr Kulchy (to (Kazakhstan) Irtysh Pavlodar)
31	MF	MDA	Valeriu Ciupercă (on loan to (Russia) Yenisey Krasnoyarsk)
34	MF	RUS	Andrei Gorbanets (to (Russia) Tom Tomsk, previously on loan to (Russia) Mordovia Saransk)
—	GK	RUS	Denis Pchelintsev (to (Russia) Rotor Volgograd, previously on loan to (Russia) Baltika Kaliningrad)
—	DF	RUS	Yegor Tarakanov (to (Russia) Volga Nizhny Novgorod, previously on loan to (Russia) Nizhny Novgorod)
—	DF	RUS	Sergei Tsukanov (to (Russia) Salyut Belgorod, previously on loan to (Russia) Torpedo Vladimir)
—	MF	RUS	Azim Fatullayev (to (Russia) Yenisey Krasnoyarsk, previously on loan)

=== Winter ===
In: Note: Flags indicate national team as defined under FIFA eligibility rules; some limited exceptions apply. Players may hold more than one non-FIFA nationality.

No.	Pos.	Nation	Player
1	GK	RUS	Aleksandr Filtsov (on loan from (Russia) FC Lokomotiv Moscow)
14	FW	BRA	Wánderson (loan from (Sweden) GAIS, previously on loan)
19	MF	BRA	Isael (from (Portugal) Nacional da Madeira)
33	MF	URU	Mauricio Pereyra (from (Argentina) Lanús)
36	DF	CMR	Adolphe Teikeu (on loan from (Ukraine) Metalurh Zaporizhzhia)
98	MF	RUS	Sergei Petrov (from (Russia) Krylia Sovetov)

Out: Note: Flags indicate national team as defined under FIFA eligibility rules; some limited exceptions apply. Players may hold more than one non-FIFA nationality.

No.	Pos.	Nation	Player
5	DF	GEO	Aleksandr Amisulashvili (to (Russia) Krylia Sovetov Samara)
8	MF	BLR	Syarhey Kislyak (end of loan from (Russia) Rubin Kazan)
10	FW	ARM	Yura Movsisyan (to (Russia) Spartak Moscow)
15	DF	BIH	Ognjen Vranješ (to (Russia) FC Alania Vladikavkaz)
19	DF	RUS	Aleksandr Yerokhin (on loan to (Russia) FC SKA-Energiya Khabarovsk)
21	FW	RUS	Khyzyr Appaev (on loan to (Russia) Rotor)
30	GK	RUS	Igor Usminskiy (to (Russia) Terek Grozny)

== Competitions ==
=== Overview ===
Competition	First match	Last match	Starting round	Final position	Record							
Competition	First match	Last match	Starting round	Final position	Pld	W	D	L	GF	GA	GD	Win %
Premier League	23 July 2012	26 May 2013	Matchday 1	10th	30	12	6	12	45	39	+6	40.00
Russian Cup	26 September 2012	30 October 2012	Round of 32	Round of 16	2	1	0	1	2	2	+0	50.00
Total					32	13	6	13	47	41	+6	40.63

Last updated: 26 May 2013
Source: See Results

=== Premier League ===
==== League table ====
Pos	Team	Pld	W	D	L	GF	GA	GD	Pts
8	Terek Grozny	30	14	6	10	38	40	−2	48 (Note: Dynamo Moscow ahead of Terek Grozny on head-to-head points; Dynamo Moscow–Terek Grozny 1–2, Terek Grozny–Dynamo Moscow 1–2.)
9	Lokomotiv Moscow	30	12	7	11	39	36	+3	43
10	Krasnodar	30	12	6	12	45	39	+6	42
11	Amkar Perm	30	7	8	15	34	51	−17	29 (Note: Amkar Perm ahead of Volga Nizhny Novgorod and Rostov on head-to-head points; Amkar Perm: 7 pts, Volga Nizhny Novgorod: 5 pts, Rostov: 4 pts.)
12	Volga Nizhny Novgorod	30	7	8	15	28	46	−18	29

Source: Russian Premier League
Rules for classification: 1) points; 2) number of wins; 3) head-to-head points; 4) number of head-to-head wins; 5) head-to-head goal difference; 6) number of head-to-head goals scored; 7) number of head-to-head away goals scored; 8) goal difference; 9) number of goals scored; 10) number of away goals scored; 11) position in the 2011–12 season (only used until all the regularly scheduled games have been played); 11) extra play-off game or tournament between the teams in question.

==== Results summary ====
Overall								Home						Away					
Pld	W	D	L	GF	GA	GD	Pts	W	D	L	GF	GA	GD	W	D	L	GF	GA	GD
30	12	6	12	45	39	+6	42	10	1	4	28	12	+16	2	5	8	17	27	−10

Last updated: 26 May 2013.
Source: See Results

==== Results by round ====
Round	1	2	3	4	5	6	7	8	9	10	11	12	13	14	15	16	17	18	19	20	21	22	23	24	25	26	27	28	29	30
Ground	H	A	H	A	H	A	H	A	H	A	H	H	A	H	A	H	A	H	A	H	A	H	A	H	A	A	H	A	H	A
Result	W	L	W	L	D	D	L	L	W	D	L	W	D	W	L	W	L	W	W	W	L	W	D	L	L	W	W	D	L	L

Updated to match(es) played on 26 May 2013. Source: See Results
A = Away; H = Home; W = Win; D = Draw; L = Loss

==== Results ====
23 July 2012 1	Krasnodar	2 – 1	Rubin Kazan	Krasnodar
19:30 MSK (UTC+4)	Movsisyan 41', 61' (pen.)	Summary	Natcho 65' (pen.)	Stadium: Kuban Stadium; Attendance: 12,000; Referee: Alexey Nikolaev

30 July 2012 2	Terek Grozny	1 – 0	Krasnodar	Grozny
19:00 MSK (UTC+4)	Ivanov 18'	Summary		Stadium: Sultan Bilimkhanov Stadium; Attendance: 14,200; Referee: Maxim Layushkin

4 August 2012 3	Krasnodar	3 – 1	Lokomotiv Moscow	Krasnodar
20:00 MSK (UTC+3)	Pavlyuchenko 47' (o.g.); Joãozinho 57' (pen.); Movsisyan 80'	Summary	Caicedo 19'	Stadium: Kuban Stadium; Attendance: 9,300; Referee: Eduard Malyi

10 August 2012 4	Kuban Krasnodar	2 – 1	Krasnodar	Krasnodar
20:00 MSK (UTC+4)	Amisulashvili 38' (o.g.); Ionov 81'	Summary	Movsisyan 86'	Stadium: Kuban Stadium; Attendance: 23,547; Referee: Evgeny Turbin

18 August 2012 5	Krasnodar	0 – 0	Rostov	Krasnodar
20:00 MSK (UTC+4)		Summary		Stadium: Kuban Stadium; Attendance: 6,200; Referee: Timur Arslanbekov

26 August 2012 6	Amkar Perm	2 – 2	Krasnodar	Perm
14:00 MSK (UTC+4)	Burmistrov 27'; Ryabokobylenko 37'	Summary	Movsisyan 20', 25'	Stadium: Zvezda Stadium; Attendance: 8,100; Referee: Aleksey Eskov

1 September 2012 7	Krasnodar	0 – 1	CSKA Moscow	Krasnodar
13:30 MSK (UTC+4)		Summary	Musa 60'	Stadium: Kuban Stadium; Attendance: 13,200; Referee: Mikhail Vilkov

16 September 2012 8	Anzhi Makhachkala	5 – 2	Krasnodar	Makhachkala
17:30 MSK (UTC+4)	Shatov 1'; João Carlos 4'; Eto'o 14', 87'; Boussoufa 48'	Summary	Abreu 38'; Vranješ 52'	Stadium: Dynamo Stadium; Attendance: 14,000; Referee: Vitali Meshkov

21 September 2012 9	Krasnodar	6 – 1	Mordovia Saransk	Krasnodar
19:00 MSK (UTC+4)	Movsisyan 5', 30'; Martynovich 38'; Anđelković 53'; Ignatyev 55'; Wánderson 90'	Summary	Bober 11'; Osipov (yellow card) 58' (yellow-red card) 81'	Stadium: Kuban Stadium; Attendance: 5,200; Referee: Sergey Kuznetsov

1 October 2012 10	Krylia Sovetov Samara	2 – 2	Krasnodar	Samara
17:30 MSK (UTC+4)	Caballero 32', 35'	Summary	Movsisyan 25'; Wánderson 54'	Stadium: Metallurg Stadion; Attendance: 10,458; Referee: Vasiliy Kazartsev

7 October 2012 11	Krasnodar	0 – 2	Zenit St. Petersburg	Krasnodar
20:15 MSK (UTC+4)		Summary	Zyryanov 69'; Fayzulin 78'	Stadium: Kuban Stadium; Attendance: 15,400; Referee: Timur Arslanbekov

20 October 2012 12	Krasnodar	2 – 0	Alania Vladikavkaz	Krasnodar
18:30 MSK (UTC+4)	Shipitsin 71'; Drinčić 88'	Summary		Stadium: Kuban Stadium; Attendance: 7,300; Referee: Igor Nizovtsev

27 October 2012 13	Volga Nizhny Novgorod	1 – 1	Krasnodar	Nizhny Novgorod
16:00 MSK (UTC+4)	Bibilov 64'	Summary	Koman 79'	Stadium: Lokomotiv Stadium; Attendance: 3,100; Referee: Sergey Kostevich

3 November 2012 14	Krasnodar	2 – 0	Dynamo Moscow	Krasnodar
18:00 MSK (UTC+4)	Wánderson 37'; Konaté 90+2'	Summary		Stadium: Kuban Stadium; Attendance: 6,500; Referee: Vladimir Kazmenko

11 November 2012 15	Spartak Moscow	2 – 0	Krasnodar	Moscow
20:15 MSK (UTC+4)	Ari 55'; Kombarov 88' (pen.)	Summary		Stadium: Luzhniki Stadium; Attendance: 8,102; Referee: Sergey Karasev

19 November 2012 16	Krasnodar	3 – 0	Terek Grozny	Krasnodar
19:45 MSK (UTC+4)	Joãozinho 14' (pen.); Wánderson 18'; Shipitsin 52'	Summary		Stadium: Kuban Stadium; Attendance: 4,500; Referee: Aleksey Eskov

24 November 2012 17	Lokomotiv Moscow	3 – 2	Krasnodar	Moscow
16:30 MSK (UTC+4)	N'Doye 3', 20'; Obinna 51'	Summary	Shipitsin 9'; Wánderson 48'	Stadium: Lokomotiv Stadium; Attendance: 10,014; Referee: Vladislav Bezborodov

30 November 2012 18	Krasnodar	2 – 1	Kuban Krasnodar	Krasnodar
18:15 MSK (UTC+4)	Shipitsin 85'; Joãozinho 90+4'	Summary	Özbiliz 55'	Stadium: Kuban Stadium; Attendance: 19,500; Referee: Alexey Nikolaev

7 December 2012 19	Rostov	2 – 3	Krasnodar	Rostov
16:30 MSK (UTC+4)	Poloz 26'; Kirichenko 56'	Summary	Wánderson 24', 50'; Shipitsin 38'	Stadium: Olimp - 2 Attendance: 5,700; Referee: Sergey Kuznetsov

8 March 2013 20	Krasnodar	2 – 1	Amkar Perm	Krasnodar
13:30 MSK (UTC+4)	Abreu 28'; Wánderson 57'	Summary	Burmistrov 25'	Stadium: Kuban Stadium; Attendance: 8,000; Referee: Vitali Meshkov

17 March 2013 21	CSKA Moscow	1 – 0	Krasnodar	Moscow
13:30 MSK (UTC+4)	Dzagoev 17'	Summary		Stadium: Luzhniki Stadium; Attendance: 10,514; Referee: Aleksey Eskov

31 March 2013 22	Krasnodar	4 – 0	Anzhi Makhachkala	Krasnodar
15:45 MSK (UTC+4)	Wánderson 33', 59', 89'; Joãozinho 47'	Summary		Stadium: Kuban Stadium; Attendance: 18,800; Referee: Alexey Nikolaev

8 April 2013 23	Mordovia Saransk	0 – 0	Krasnodar	Saransk
20:00 MSK (UTC+4)		Summary		Stadium: Start Stadium; Attendance: 7,300; Referee: Igor Nizovtsev

13 April 2013 24	Krasnodar	0 – 3	Krylia Sovetov Samara	Krasnodar
18:30 MSK (UTC+4)		Summary	Goreux 2'; Maksimov 90', 90+3'	Stadium: Kuban Stadium; Attendance: 7,500; Referee: Sergey Lapochkin

21 April 2013 25	Zenit St. Petersburg	1 – 0	Krasnodar	Saint Petersburg
16:00 MSK (UTC+4)	Danny 90+4'	Summary		Stadium: Petrovsky Stadium; Attendance: 18,877; Referee: Sergey Ivanov

29 April 2013 26	Alania Vladikavkaz	2 – 3	Krasnodar	Vladikavkaz
18:30 MSK (UTC+4)	Vranješ 61'; Welinton 72'	Summary	Joãozinho 38'; Wánderson 54', 90+3'; Nakhushev (yellow card) 72' (yellow-red card) 75'	Stadium: Republican Spartak Stadium; Attendance: 10,000; Referee: Aleksey Eskov

5 May 2013 27	Krasnodar	2 – 0	Volga Nizhny Novgorod	Krasnodar
18:30 MSK (UTC+4)	Petrov 22'; Isael 42'; Konaté (red card) 90'	Summary		Stadium: Kuban Stadium; Attendance: 5,300; Referee: Maxim Layushkin

11 May 2013 28	Dynamo Moscow	1 – 1	Krasnodar	Moscow
13:30 MSK (UTC+4)	Kokorin 69'	Summary	Pereyra 52'	Stadium: Arena Khimki; Attendance: 5,864; Referee: Sergey Karasev

18 May 2013 29	Krasnodar	0 – 1	Spartak Moscow	Krasnodar
19:30 MSK (UTC+4)		Summary	Yakovlev 75'	Stadium: Kuban Stadium; Attendance: 22,000; Referee: Vitali Meshkov

26 May 2013 30	Rubin Kazan	2 – 0	Krasnodar	Kazan
13:30 MSK (UTC+4)	Eremenko 7'; Natcho 64'	Summary		Stadium: Tsentralnyi Stadion; Attendance: 6,120; Referee: Aleksandr Egorov

=== Russian Cup ===
26 September 2012 Round of 32	Khimik Dzerzhinsk	1 – 2	Krasnodar	Dzerzhinsk
18:00 MSK (UTC+4)	Makeyev 70'	Summary	Markov 80'; Erokhin 84'	Stadium: Khimik Stadium; Attendance: 5,000; Referee: Vladimir Seldyakov

30 October 2012 Round of 16	Kuban Krasnodar	1 – 0	Krasnodar	Krasnodar
19:30 MSK (UTC+4)	Pizzelli 19'	Summary		Stadium: Kuban Stadium; Attendance: 18,660; Referee: Maxim Layushkin

== Squad statistics ==
As of match played 26 May 2013

=== Appearances and goals ===
No.	Pos	Nat	Player	Total		Premier League		Russian Cup	
No.	Pos	Nat	Player	Apps	Goals	Apps	Goals	Apps	Goals
1	GK	(Georgia (country)) GEO	Nukri Revishvili	5	0	4	0	1	0
2	DF	(Uzbekistan) UZB	Nikolay Markov	15	1	13	0	2	1
3	DF	(Serbia) SRB	Dušan Anđelković	22	1	16+5	1	0+1	0
4	DF	(Belarus) BLR	Alyaksandr Martynovich	22	1	20+1	1	1	0
6	DF	(Russia) RUS	Ruslan Nakhushev	16	0	13+2	0	1	0
7	MF	(Russia) RUS	Vladislav Ignatyev	28	1	18+9	1	1	0
11	FW	(Senegal) SEN	Moussa Konaté	12	0	0+10	0	1+1	0
14	MF	(Brazil) BRA	Wánderson	24	13	19+3	13	1+1	0
18	MF	(Montenegro) MNE	Nikola Drinčić	18	1	17+0	1	1	0
20	MF	(Russia) RUS	Igor Lambarschi	8	0	2+5	0	0+1	0
22	MF	(Brazil) BRA	Joãozinho	31	5	30	5	1	0
23	GK	(Russia) RUS	Aleksandr Filtsov	8	0	8	0	0	0
25	MF	(Russia) RUS	Yevgeni Shipitsin	19	5	12+6	5	1	0
26	MF	(Portugal) POR	Márcio Abreu	29	2	25+3	2	1	0
27	MF	(Brazil) BRA	Isael	8	1	6+2	1	0	0
28	DF	(Russia) RUS	Igor Smolnikov	27	0	24+2	0	1	0
33	MF	(Uruguay) URU	Mauricio Pereyra	9	1	9	1	0	0
36	DF	(Cameroon) CMR	Adolphe Teikeu	5	0	2+3	0	0	0
55	DF	(Serbia) SRB	Nemanja Tubić	17	0	15+1	0	1	0
68	MF	(Russia) RUS	Nika Chkhapeliya	1	0	0	0	1	0
77	MF	(Hungary) HUN	Vladimir Koman	28	1	12+14	1	2	0
88	GK	(Russia) RUS	Andrey Sinitsyn	16	0	15	0	1	0
98	MF	(Russia) RUS	Sergei Petrov	9	1	9	1	0	0
Players who left Krasnodar on loan during the season:
19	MF	(Russia) RUS	Aleksandr Yerokhin	3	1	0+2	0	1	1
21	FW	(Russia) RUS	Khyzyr Appayev	5	0	1+2	0	1+1	0
Players who appeared for Krasnodar who left during the season:
5	DF	(Georgia (country)) GEO	Aleksandre Amisulashvili	17	0	14+3	0	0	0
8	MF	(Belarus) BLR	Syarhey Kislyak	13	0	3+8	0	1+1	0
10	FW	(Armenia) ARM	Yura Movsisyan	14	9	13+1	9	0	0
15	DF	(Bosnia and Herzegovina) BIH	Ognjen Vranješ	9	0	7+1	0	1	0
17	MF	(Russia) RUS	Pavel Golyshev	1	0	0+1	0	0	0

=== Goal scorers ===
Place	Position	Nation	Number	Name	Premier League	Russian Cup	Total
1	MF	(Brazil)	14	Wánderson	13	0	13
2	FW	(Armenia)	10	Yura Movsisyan	9	0	9
3	MF	(Brazil)	22	Joãozinho	5	0	5
3	MF	(Russia)	25	Yevgeni Shipitsin	5	0	5
5	MF	(Portugal)	26	Márcio Abreu	2	0	2
6	DF	(Bosnia and Herzegovina)	15	Ognjen Vranješ	1	0	1
6	DF	(Belarus)	4	Alyaksandr Martynovich	1	0	1
6	DF	(Serbia)	3	Dušan Anđelković	1	0	1
6	MF	(Russia)	7	Vladislav Ignatyev	1	0	1
6	MF	(Montenegro)	18	Nikola Drinčić	1	0	1
6	MF	(Hungary)	77	Vladimir Koman	1	0	1
6	MF	(Russia)	98	Sergei Petrov	1	0	1
6	MF	(Uruguay)	33	Mauricio Pereyra	1	0	1
6	MF	(Brazil)	27	Isael	1	0	1
6	FW	(Senegal)	11	Moussa Konaté	1	0	1
6				Own goal	1	0	1
6	DF	(Uzbekistan)	2	Nikolay Markov	0	1	1
6	MF	(Russia)	19	Aleksandr Yerokhin	0	1	1
				TOTALS	45	2	47

=== Clean sheets ===
Place	Position	Nation	Number	Name	Premier League	Russian Cup	Total
1	GK	(Russia)	88	Andrei Sinitsyn	4	0	4
2	GK	(Russia)	23	Aleksandr Filtsov	3	0	3
				TOTALS	7	0	7

=== Disciplinary record ===
Number	Nation	Position	Name	Premier League		Russian Cup		Total	
Number	Nation	Position	Name	Yellow card	Red card	Yellow card	Red card	Yellow card	Red card
1	(Georgia (country))	GK	Nukri Revishvili	1	0	0	0	1	0
2	(Uzbekistan)	DF	Nikolay Markov	2	0	1	0	3	0
3	(Serbia)	DF	Dušan Anđelković	3	0	0	0	3	0
4	(Belarus)	DF	Alyaksandr Martynovich	5	1	1	0	6	1
6	(Russia)	DF	Ruslan Nakhushev	5	1	0	0	5	1
7	(Russia)	MF	Vladislav Ignatyev	3	0	0	0	3	0
11	(Senegal)	FW	Moussa Konaté	1	1	0	0	1	1
14	(Brazil)	MF	Wánderson	1	0	0	0	1	0
18	(Montenegro)	MF	Nikola Drinčić	2	0	1	0	3	0
22	(Brazil)	MF	Joãozinho	1	0	1	0	2	0
25	(Russia)	MF	Yevgeni Shipitsin	2	0	0	0	2	0
26	(Portugal)	MF	Márcio Abreu	8	0	0	0	8	0
28	(Russia)	DF	Igor Smolnikov	8	0	0	0	8	0
33	(Uruguay)	MF	Mauricio Pereyra	3	0	0	0	3	0
55	(Serbia)	DF	Nemanja Tubić	3	0	0	0	3	0
77	(Hungary)	MF	Vladimir Koman	4	0	1	0	5	0
88	(Russia)	GK	Andrei Sinitsyn	2	0	0	0	2	0
98	(Russia)	MF	Sergei Petrov	1	0	0	0	1	0
Players away on loan:
Players who left Krasnodar during the season:
5	(Georgia (country))	DF	Aleksandre Amisulashvili	2	0	0	0	2	0
8	(Belarus)	MF	Syarhey Kislyak	1	0	0	0	1	0
10	(Armenia)	FW	Yura Movsisyan	2	0	0	0	2	0
15	(Bosnia and Herzegovina)	DF	Ognjen Vranješ	1	0	0	0	1	0
			TOTALS	61	3	5	0	66	3
