= List of FC Krasnodar records and statistics =

FC Krasnodar is a Russian professional football club based in Krasnodar.

This list encompasses the major records set by the club and their players in the Russian Premier League. The player records section includes details of the club's goalscorers and those who have made more than 50 appearances in first-team competitions.

== Player ==
=== Most appearances ===
As of match played 24 May 2025

Players who've played over 50 competitive, professional matches only. Appearances include substitute appearances, (goals in parentheses).

Bold, players still at Krasnodar, Bold Italicised players currently away from Krasnodar on loan.

	Name	Years	League	Russian Cup	Super Cup	Europe	Total
1	(Russia) Sergei Petrov	2013–Present	249 (13)	27 (1)	0 (0)	47 (1)	323 (15)
2	(Russia) Yury Gazinsky	2013–2022, 2024–Present	212 (12)	22 (0)	0 (0)	55 (3)	289 (15)
3	(Belarus) Alyaksandr Martynovich	2010–2022	197 (5)	15 (0)	(-)	41 (0)	253 (5)
4	(Brazil) Joãozinho	2011–2012	177 (28)	14 (3)	(-)	26 (9)	217 (40)
5	(Uruguay) Mauricio Pereyra	2013–2019	154 (23)	8 (0)	(-)	39 (6)	201 (29)
6	(Ecuador) Cristian Ramírez	2017-2023	135(2)	20 (0)	(-)	32 (1)	187 (3)
7	(Sweden) Andreas Granqvist	2013–2018	133 (3)	10 (3)	(-)	36 (4)	179 (10)
8	(Russia) Matvei Safonov	2017-2024	147 (0)	11 (0)	(-)	17 (0)	175 (0)
9	(Russia) Ari	2013–2021	120 (38)	12 (3)	(-)	41 (13)	173 (54)
10	(Brazil) Wánderson	2012, 2013–2017	177 (37)	12 (4)	(-)	26 (8)	155 (49)
11	(Russia) Pavel Mamayev	2013, 2013–2019	112 (25)	11 (3)	(-)	24 (7)	147 (35)
11	(Sweden) Viktor Claesson	2017–2022	114 (32)	8 (3)	(-)	25 (8)	147 (43)
13	(Armenia) Eduard Spertsyan	2018–Present	115 (40)	25 (4)	1 (0)	2 (2)	143 (44)
14	(Brazil) Wanderson	2017–2022	98 (14)	4 (0)	(-)	28 (2)	130 (16)
15	(Russia) Fyodor Smolov	2015–2018, 2024-present	91 (54)	11 (4)	1 (1)	22 (9)	125 (68)
16	(Burkina Faso) Charles Kaboré	2015-2016, 2016-2019	86 (2)	10 (0)	(-)	28 (0)	124 (2)
17	(Brazil) Kaio	2019-present	96 (3)	16 (1)	1 (0)	10 (0)	123 (4)
18	(Russia) Magomed-Shapi Suleymanov	2017–2023	86 (16)	5 (0)	(-)	31 (7)	122 (23)
19	(Russia) Aleksandr Chernikov	2019–Present	97 (5)	23 (1)	1 (0)	0 (0)	121 (6)
20	(Russia) Vitali Kaleshin	2013-2017	87 (3)	6 (0)	(-)	26 (0)	119 (3)
20	(Russia) Nikita Krivtsov	2021-Present	96 (15)	22 (3)	1 (1)	0 (0)	119 (19)
22	(Colombia) Ricardo Laborde	2013–2018	74 (11)	11 (3)	(-)	32 (5)	117 (19)
23	(Colombia) Jhon Córdoba	2021-present	90 (47)	25 (11)	0 (0)	0 (0)	115 (58)
24	(Russia) Andrei Sinitsyn	2012–2020	77 (0)	12 (0)	(-)	14 (0)	103 (0)
25	(Uzbekistan) Odil Ahmedov	2014-2017	67 (5)	4 (0)	(-)	30 (1)	101 (6)
25	(Nigeria) Olakunle Olusegun	2022, 2022-present	79 (10)	21 (2)	1 (0)	0 (0)	101 (12)
27	(Portugal) Márcio Abreu	2011–2014	89 (9)	6 (0)	(-)	0 (0)	95 (9)
28	(Angola) João Batxi	2022-present	73 (9)	18 (0)	1 (0)	0 (0)	92 (9)
29	(Poland) Artur Jędrzejczyk	2013-2017	60 (1)	7 (0)	(-)	24 (1)	91 (2)
30	(Iceland) Ragnar Sigurðsson	2014-2016	59 (2)	7 (1)	(-)	20 (1)	86 (4)
31	(Russia) Aleksei Ionov	2020-2023	70 (13)	13 (0)	(-)	2 (0)	85 (13)
32	(Sweden) Kristoffer Olsson	2019-2021	59 (4)	2 (0)	(-)	19 (0)	80 (4)
33	(Netherlands) Tonny Vilhena	2019–2022	57 (6)	3 (1)	(-)	19 (2)	79 (9)
34	(Cape Verde) Kevin Pina	2022-present	59 (5)	18 (0)	1 (0)	0 (0)	78 (5)
35	(Serbia) Uroš Spajić	2018-2021	53 (2)	4 (0)	(-)	19 (0)	76 (2)
36	(Russia) Sergei Volkov	2021-2024	53 (2)	20 (0)	(-)	0 (0)	73 (2)
37	(Russia) Stanislav Kritsyuk	2016, 2016–2020	49 (0)	5 (0)	(-)	18 (0)	72 (0)
38	(Serbia) Dušan Anđelković	2011-2014	66 (1)	5 (0)	(-)	0 (0)	71 (1)
39	(Russia) Yevgeni Shipitsin	2011–2015	63 (13)	5 (5)	(-)	0 (0)	68 (13)
39	(Russia) Dmitry Stotsky	2018-2022	49 (2)	7 (0)	(-)	12 (0)	68 (2)
41	(Russia) Yegor Sorokin	2019-2023	56 (0)	7 (0)	(-)	4 (0)	67 (0)
42	(Nigeria) Moses Cobnan	2023-present	45 (5)	20 (2)	1 (0)	0 (0)	66 (7)
43	(Serbia) Mihajlo Banjac	2022-present	45 (3)	20 (0)	(-)	0 (0)	65 (3)
44	(Uzbekistan) Nikolay Markov	2011-2016, 2018-2020	52 (1)	9 (2)	(-)	3 (0)	64 (3)
44	(Serbia) Nemanja Tubić	2011-2014	60 (1)	4 (0)	(-)	0 (0)	64 (1)
44	(Russia) Daniil Utkin	2018–2022	49 (6)	3 (0)	(-)	12 (1)	64 (7)
47	(Russia) Igor Smolnikov	2012-2013, 2020-2021	53 (0)	2 (0)	(-)	8 (0)	63 (0)
47	(Sweden) Marcus Berg	2019–2021	44 (18)	2 (0)	(-)	17 (4)	63 (22)
49	(France) Rémy Cabella	2019–2022	49 (14)	3 (0)	(-)	10 (3)	62 (17)
49	(Uruguay) Lucas Olaza	2023-present	52 (2)	10 (0)	0 (0)	0 (0)	62 (2)
51	(Montenegro) Nikola Drinčić	2011–2013	57 (3)	4 (0)	(-)	0 (0)	61 (3)
51	(Russia) Ilzat Akhmetov	2022-2024	42 (4)	19 (3)	(-)	0 (0)	61 (7)
53	(Ukraine) Andriy Dykan	2014–2016	39 (0)	1 (0)	(-)	19 (0)	59 (0)
54	(Russia) Stanislav Agkatsev	2020-present	39 (0)	17 (0)	1 (0)	1 (0)	58 (0)
55	(Georgia (country)) Aleksandre Amisulashvili	2011-2012	54 (1)	3 (0)	(-)	0 (0)	57 (1)
56	(Russia) Ivan Ignatyev	2017–2019	37 (13)	3 (2)	(-)	14 (2)	54 (17)
56	(Paraguay) Júnior Alonso	2022-2024	41 (1)	13 (0)	(-)	0 (0)	54 (1)
56	(Brazil) Vítor Tormena	2023-present	46 (2)	7 (0)	1 (0)	0 (0)	54 (2)
59	(Russia) Vladimir Bystrov	2014–2017	40 (3)	4 (0)	(-)	9 (2)	53 (5)
60	(Armenia) Yura Movsisyan	2011–2012	51 (23)	1 (0)	(-)	0 (0)	52 (23)

=== Goal scorers ===
As of Match played 24 May 2025
Competitive, professional matches only, appearances including substitutes appear in brackets.
Bold, players still at Krasnodar, Bold Italicised players currently away from Krasnodar on loan.

	Name	Years	League	Russian Cup	Super Cup	Europe	Total
1	(Russia) Fyodor Smolov	2015–2018, 2024-present	54 (91)	4 (11)	1 (1)	9 (22)	68 (125)
2	(Colombia) Jhon Córdoba	2021-present	47 (90)	11 (25)	0 (0)	0 (0)	58 (115)
3	(Russia) Ari	2013–2021	38 (120)	3 (12)	(-)	13 (41)	54 (173)
4	(Brazil) Wánderson	2012, 2013–2017	37 (117)	4 (12)	(-)	8 (26)	49 (155)
5	(Armenia) Eduard Spertsyan	2018–Present	40 (115)	4 (25)	0 (1)	0 (2)	44 (143)
6	(Sweden) Viktor Claesson	2017–2022	32 (114)	3 (8)	(-)	8 (25)	43 (147)
7	(Brazil) Joãozinho	2011–2012	28 (177)	3 (14)	(-)	9 (26)	40 (217)
8	(Russia) Pavel Mamayev	2013, 2013–2019	25 (112)	3 (11)	(-)	7 (24)	35 (147)
9	(Uruguay) Mauricio Pereyra	2013–2019	23 (154)	0 (8)	(-)	6 (39)	29 (201)
10	(Armenia) Yura Movsisyan	2011–2012	23 (51)	0 (1)	(-)	0 (0)	23 (52)
10	(Russia) Magomed-Shapi Suleymanov	2017–2024	16 (86)	0 (5)	(-)	7 (31)	23 (122)
12	(Sweden) Marcus Berg	2019–2021	18 (44)	0 (2)	(-)	4 (17)	22 (63)
13	(Colombia) Ricardo Laborde	2013–2018	11 (74)	3 (11)	(-)	5 (32)	19 (117)
13	(Russia) Nikita Krivtsov	2021-Present	15 (97)	3 (21)	1 (1)	0 (0)	19 (119)
15	(Russia) Ivan Ignatyev	2017–2019	13 (37)	2 (3)	(-)	2 (14)	17 (54)
15	(France) Rémy Cabella	2019–2022	14 (49)	0 (3)	(-)	3 (10)	17 (62)
17	(Brazil) Wanderson	2017–2022	14 (98)	0 (4)	(-)	2 (28)	16 (130)
18	(Russia) Sergei Petrov	2013–Present	13 (249)	1 (27)	0 (0)	1 (47)	15 (323)
18	(Russia) Yury Gazinsky	2013–2022, 2024–Present	12 (212)	0 (22)	(-)	3 (55)	15 (289)
20	(Nigeria) Olakunle Olusegun	2022, 2022-present	12 (79)	2 (20)	0 (1)	0 (0)	14 (100)
21	(Russia) Yevgeni Shipitsin	2011–2015	13 (63)	0 (5)	(-)	0 (0)	13 (68)
21	(Russia) Aleksei Ionov	2020-2023	13 (70)	0 (13)	(-)	0 (2)	13 (85)
23	(Sweden) Andreas Granqvist	2013–2018	3 (133)	3 (10)	(-)	4 (36)	10 (179)
24	(Portugal) Márcio Abreu	2011–2014	9 (89)	0 (6)	(-)	0 (0)	9 (95)
24	(Netherlands) Tonny Vilhena	2019–2022	6 (57)	1 (3)	(-)	2 (19)	9 (79)
24	(Angola) João Batxi	2022-present	9 (73)	0 (18)	0 (1)	0 (0)	9 (92)
27	(Russia) Roman Shirokov	2014, 2015	7 (18)	0 (2)	(-)	0 (0)	7 (20)
27	(Russia) Daniil Utkin	2018–2022	6 (49)	0 (3)	(-)	1 (12)	7 (64)
27	(Russia) Ilzat Akhmetov	2022-2024	4 (42)	3 (19)	(-)	0 (0)	7 (61)
27	(Brazil) Kady Borges	2023-2024	5 (33)	2 (11)	(-)	0 (0)	7 (44)
27	(Nigeria) Moses Cobnan	2023-present	5 (45)	2 (20)	0 (1)	0 (0)	7 (66)
32	(Uzbekistan) Odil Ahmedov	2014-2017	5 (67)	0 (4)	(-)	1 (30)	6 (101)
32	(Russia) Aleksandr Chernikov	2019–Present	5 (97)	1 (23)	0 (1)	0 (0)	6 (121)
34	(Moldova) Igor Picuşceac	2009–2012	4 (19)	1 (1)	(-)	0 (0)	5 (20)
34	(Belarus) Alyaksandr Martynovich	2010–2022	5 (197)	0 (15)	(-)	0 (41)	5 (253)
34	(Russia) Vladimir Bystrov	2014–2017	3 (40)	0 (4)	(-)	2 (9)	5 (53)
34	(Poland) Grzegorz Krychowiak	2021–2023	4 (14)	1 (1)	(-)	0 (0)	5 (15)
34	(Cape Verde) Kevin Pina	2022-present	5 (59)	0 (18)	0 (1)	0 (0)	5 (78)
39	(Iceland) Ragnar Sigurðsson	2014-2016	2 (59)	1 (7)	(-)	1 (20)	4 (86)
39	(Sweden) Kristoffer Olsson	2019-2021	4 (59)	0 (2)	(-)	0 (19)	4 (80)
39	(Russia) Vladimir Ilyin	2021-2022	4 (22)	0 (2)	(-)	0 (0)	4 (24)
39	(Russia) Aleksandr Koksharov	2022-present	1 (13)	3 (7)	(-)	0 (0)	4 (20)
39	(Brazil) Kaio	2019-present	3 (96)	1 (16)	0 (1)	0 (10)	4 (123)
39	(Brazil) Victor Sá	2024-present	4 (37)	0 (3)	0 (1)	0 (0)	4 (42)
39	(Russia) Danila Kozlov	2024-present	2 (23)	2 (8)	0 (1)	0 (0)	4 (32)
46	(Georgia (country)) Otar Martsvaladze	2011–2012	3 (22)	0 (0)	(-)	0 (0)	3 (22)
46	(Russia) Aleksandr Yerokhin	2011–2013	1 (19)	2 (3)	(-)	0 (0)	3 (22)
46	(Montenegro) Nikola Drinčić	2011–2013	3 (57)	0 (4)	(-)	0 (0)	3 (61)
46	(Brazil) Isael	2012–2014	2 (21)	1 (2)	(-)	0 (0)	3 (23)
46	(Russia) Vitali Kaleshin	2013-2017	3 (87)	0 (6)	(-)	0 (26)	3 (119)
46	(Russia) Marat Izmailov	2014-2015, 2016-2017	2 (29)	1 (2)	(-)	0 (11)	3 (42)
46	(Georgia (country)) Tornike Okriashvili	2016–2018	2 (16)	0 (3)	(-)	1 (1)	3 (20)
46	(Uzbekistan) Nikolay Markov	2011-2016, 2018-2020	1 (52)	2 (9)	(-)	0 (3)	3 (64)
46	(Portugal) Manuel Fernandes	2019–2020	2 (16)	0 (0)	(-)	1 (3)	3 (19)
46	(Ecuador) Cristian Ramírez	2017-2023	2 (135)	0 (20)	(-)	1 (32)	3 (187)
46	(Serbia) Mihajlo Banjac	2022-present	3 (45)	0 (20)	(-)	0 (0)	3 (65)
57	(Russia) Pavel Golyshev	2012	2 (11)	0 (0)	(-)	0 (0)	2 (11)
57	(Russia) Andrei Mikheyev	2009-2012	2 (19)	0 (2)	(-)	0 (0)	2 (21)
57	(Senegal) Moussa Konaté	2012-2014	0 (10)	0 (2)	(-)	2 (1)	2 (13)
57	(Poland) Artur Jędrzejczyk	2013-2017	1 (60)	0 (7)	(-)	1 (24)	2 (91)
57	(Armenia) Marcos Pizzelli	2013-2014	0 (6)	2 (2)	(-)	0 (0)	2 (8)
57	(Ivory Coast) Gerard Gohou	2013-2014	1 (6)	1 (1)	(-)	0 (0)	2 (7)
57	(Burkina Faso) Charles Kaboré	2015-2016, 2016-2019	2 (86)	0 (10)	(-)	0 (28)	2 (124)
57	(Brazil) Naldo	2016-2017	2 (14)	0 (1)	(-)	0 (9)	2 (24)
57	(Serbia) Uroš Spajić	2018-2021	2 (53)	0 (4)	(-)	0 (19)	2 (76)
57	(Russia) Dmitry Stotsky	2018-2022	2 (49)	0 (7)	(-)	0 (12)	2 (68)
57	(Russia) Dmitri Skopintsev	2019	2 (14)	0 (1)	(-)	0 (2)	2 (17)
57	(Russia) Vyacheslav Litvinov	2020-2023	0 (27)	2 (9)	(-)	0 (0)	2 (36)
57	(Russia) Sergei Volkov	2021-2024	2 (53)	0 (20)	(-)	0 (0)	2 (73)
57	(Brazil) Vítor Tormena	2023-Present	2 (46)	0 (7)	0 (1)	0 (0)	2 (54)
57	(Uruguay) Lucas Olaza	2023-present	2 (52)	0 (10)	0 (0)	0 (0)	1 (62)
72	(Georgia (country)) Aleksandre Amisulashvili	2011-2012	1 (54)	0 (3)	(-)	0 (0)	1 (57)
72	(Russia) Vladimir Tatarchuk	2008-2012	1 (26)	0 (2)	(-)	0 (0)	1 (28)
72	(Moldova) Igor Lambarschi	2011-2014	1 (18)	0 (1)	(-)	0 (0)	1 (19)
72	(Russia) Oleg Samsonov	2011-2014	1 (17)	0 (0)	(-)	0 (0)	1 (17)
72	(Belarus) Alyaksandr Kulchy	2011-2012	1 (29)	0 (2)	(-)	0 (0)	1 (31)
72	(Serbia) Nemanja Tubić	2011-2014	1 (60)	0 (4)	(-)	0 (0)	1 (64)
72	(Russia) Spartak Gogniyev	2010-2011	0 (13)	1 (2)	(-)	0 (0)	1 (15)
72	(Portugal) Rui Miguel	2011	1 (4)	(-)	0 (0)	0 (0)	1 (4)
72	(Serbia) Dušan Anđelković	2011-2014	1 (66)	0 (5)	(-)	0 (0)	1 (71)
72	(Russia) Vladislav Ignatyev	2012-2013	1 (27)	0 (1)	(-)	0 (0)	1 (28)
72	(Hungary) Vladimir Koman	2012-2014	1 (26)	0 (2)	(-)	0 (0)	1 (28)
72	(Russia) Nikita Burmistrov	2014-2016	0 (5)	0 (1)	(-)	1 (4)	1 (10)
72	(Russia) Aleksandr Ageyev	2012-2017	0 (0)	1 (1)	(-)	0 (2)	1 (3)
72	(Russia) Vyacheslav Podberyozkin	2016-2018	1 (32)	0 (3)	(-)	0 (9)	1 (44)
72	(Ivory Coast) Eboue Kouassi	2016-2017	0 (10)	0 (0)	(-)	1 (9)	1 (19)
72	(Russia) Roman Shishkin	2017, 2017-2019	0 (29)	1 (3)	(-)	0 (3)	1 (35)
72	(Russia) Aleksei Gritsayenko	2017-2020	1 (10)	0 (1)	(-)	0 (0)	1 (11)
72	(Russia) Oleg Shatov	2018	1 (6)	0 (0)	(-)	0 (0)	1 (6)
72	(Peru) Christian Cueva	2018-2020	0 (15)	1 (2)	(-)	0 (6)	1 (23)
72	(Denmark) Younes Namli	2019-2022	1 (10)	0 (1)	(-)	0 (7)	1 (18)
72	(Russia) Leon Sabua	2019-2022	1 (3)	0 (0)	(-)	0 (2)	1 (5)
72	(Russia) Irakli Manelov	2021-2023	1 (22)	0 (3)	(-)	0 (0)	1 (25)
72	(Paraguay) Júnior Alonso	2022-2024	1 (41)	0 (13)	(-)	0 (0)	1 (54)
72	(Russia) Maksim Kutovoy	2019-2023	1 (11)	0 (0)	(-)	0 (0)	1 (11)
72	(Russia) Sergei Borodin	2018-2023	1 (14)	0 (2)	(-)	0 (0)	1 (16)
72	(Armenia) Georgy Arutyunyan	2023-2025	0 (6)	1 (14)	0 (0)	0 (0)	1 (20)
72	(Brazil) Diego Costa	2024-Present	1 (28)	0 (4)	0 (0)	0 (0)	1 (32)
72	(Colombia) Kevin Castaño	2023-2025	1 (25)	0 (7)	0 (0)	0 (0)	1 (32)

== International representatives ==
As of match played 3 May 2025

=== Current players ===
Krasnodar years	Nation	Player	Caps	Goals	International years
2013-	Russia	Sergei Petrov	5	1	2016–
2013-2022, 2024-	Russia	Yury Gazinsky	21	1	2016-2020
2015-2018, 2024-	Russia	Fyodor Smolov	45	16	2012-2021
2018-	Armenia	Eduard Spertsyan	32	6	2021–
2019-	Russia	Aleksandr Chernikov	3	1	2023–
2019-	Russia	Nikita Krivtsov	3	2	2023–
2022–	Angola	João Batxi	1	0	2021-
2022–	Cape Verde	Kevin Pina	22	2	2022-
2023–	Uruguay	Lucas Olaza	7	0	2023-
2024–	Uruguay	Giovanni González	17	0	2019-

=== Former players ===
Krasnodar years	Nation	Player	Caps	Goals	International years
2009-2012	Moldova	Igor Picușceac	20	3	2007-2015
2010-2022	Belarus	Alyaksandr Martynovich	75	2	2009-2020
2011	Russia	Roman Vorobyov	2	0	2007-2008
2011-2012	Armenia	Yura Movsisyan	38	14	2010-2018
2011-2012	Belarus	Alyaksandr Kulchy	102	5	1996-2012
2011-2013	Bosnia and Herzegovina	Ognjen Vranješ	38	0	2010-2018
2011-2012	Georgia	Aleksandre Amisulashvili	45	4	2002-2016
2011-2012	Georgia	Otar Martsvaladze	22	2	2006-2014
2011-2013	Montenegro	Nikola Drinčić	33	3	2007-2014
2011-2014	Serbia	Dušan Anđelković	1	0	2007
2012	Belarus	Syarhey Kislyak	74	0	2009-2021
2012-2013	Georgia	Nukri Revishvili	33	0	2005-2019
2012-2013; 2020-2021	Russia	Igor Smolnikov	30	0	2013-2020
2012-2014	Hungary	Vladimir Koman	36	7	2010-2015
2012-2014	Moldova	Valeriu Ciupercă	1	0	2011
2012-2014	Senegal	Moussa Konaté	34	12	2012-
2013-2017	Poland	Artur Jędrzejczyk	41	3	2010-
2013; 2013-2018	Russia	Pavel Mamayev	15	0	2010-2016
2013-2014	Armenia	Marcos Pizzelli	68	11	2008-2019
2013-2021	Russia	Ari	2	0	2018
2013-2018	Sweden	Andreas Granqvist	88	9	2006-2019
2014; 2015	Russia	Roman Shirokov	57	13	2008-2016
2014-2016	Iceland	Ragnar Sigurðsson	97	5	2007-2020
2014-2017	Russia	Vladimir Bystrov	47	4	2004-2013
2014-2015; 2016-2017	Russia	Marat Izmailov	35	2	2001-2012
2014-2016	Ukraine	Andriy Dykan	8	0	2010-2012
2014-2017	Uzbekistan	Odil Ahmedov	108	21	2007-2021
2015-2016; 2016-2019	Burkina Faso	Charles Kaboré	101	4	2006-
2015-2019	Norway	Stefan Strandberg	30	1	2013-
2015-2017	Russia	Dmitri Torbinski	30	2	2007-2016
2016-2020	Russia	Stanislav Kritsyuk	2	0	2016
2016-2018	Georgia	Tornike Okriashvili	46	12	2010-
2016–2023	Russia	Sergei Borodin	1	0	2022-
2017-2022	Sweden	Viktor Claesson	67	13	2012-
2017; 2017-2019	Russia	Roman Shishkin	16	0	2007-2017
2017-2019	Romania	Andrei Ivan	17	1	2015-
2017-2018	Russia	Renat Yanbayev	12	0	2008-2012
2017-2018	Serbia	Mihailo Ristić	9	0	2016-
2017–2023	Ecuador	Cristian Ramírez	22	1	2013-
2017-2024	Russia	Matvei Safonov	14	0	2021–
2018	Russia	Oleg Shatov	28	2	2013-2016
2018-2020	Iceland	Jón Guðni Fjóluson	18	1	2010-
2018-2020	Peru	Christian Cueva	96	16	2011-
2018-2022	Russia	Dmitry Stotsky	1	0	2018
2018-2021	Serbia	Uroš Spajić	20	0	2015-
2019-2021	Sweden	Kristoffer Olsson	44	0	2017-
2019-2022	France	Rémy Cabella	4	0	2014
2019-2022	Netherlands	Tonny Vilhena	15	0	2015-2018
2019-2020	Portugal	Manuel Fernandes	15	3	2005-2018
2019-2021	Russia	Ruslan Kambolov	6	0	2015-2018
2019-2021	Sweden	Marcus Berg	90	24	2008-2021
2019-2023	Russia	Yegor Sorokin	1	0	2018
2020-2023	Russia	Aleksei Ionov	39	4	2011–2021
2021	Cameroon	Ambroise Oyongo	50	2	2013-
2021–2023	Poland	Grzegorz Krychowiak	98	5	2008-
2022–2023	Russia	Ilzat Akhmetov	9	0	2019-
2022–2024	Tajikistan	Alidzhoni Ayni	12	0	2021-
2022–2024	Paraguay	Júnior Alonso	61	3	2013-
2023–2025	Colombia	Kevin Castaño	16	0	2023-
