= List of Russian football transfers winter 2012–13 =

This is a list of Russian football transfers in the winter transfer window 2012–13 by club. Only clubs of the 2012–13 Russian Premier League are included.

== Russian Premier League 2012–13 ==
=== Alania Vladikavkaz ===
In: Note: Flags indicate national team as defined under FIFA eligibility rules; some limited exceptions apply. Players may hold more than one non-FIFA nationality.

No.	Pos.	Nation	Player
—	GK	RUS	Soslan Dzhanayev (from Terek Grozny)
—	DF	BRA	Welinton (loan from (Brazil) Flamengo)
—	DF	BIH	Ognjen Vranješ (from Krasnodar)
—	MF	BLR	Renan Bressan (from (Belarus) BATE Borisov)
—	MF	GEO	Giorgi Chanturia (loan from (Netherlands) Vitesse Arnhem)
—	FW	RUS	Aleksandr Prudnikov (from Kuban Krasnodar)
—	MF	RUS	Georgi Gabulov (from Anzhi Makhachkala)
—	FW	SLV	Rodolfo Zelaya (from (El Salvador) Alianza)
—	MF	NED	Royston Drenthe (from (Spain) Real Madrid C.F.)
—	DF	RUS	Dmitri Tikhiy (from FC Luch-Energiya Vladivostok)

Out: Note: Flags indicate national team as defined under FIFA eligibility rules; some limited exceptions apply. Players may hold more than one non-FIFA nationality.

No.	Pos.	Nation	Player
—	MF	KAZ	Kazbek Geteriev (to (Kazakhstan) Kairat Almaty)
36	DF	RUS	Dmitri Grachyov (to FC Ufa)
—	FW	RUS	Dmitri Golubov (to FC Ufa)
—	MF	GEO	Shota Grigalashvili (to FC SKA-Energiya Khabarovsk)
—	DF	BRA	Carlos Cardoso (to (Brazil) Vitória)
—	MF	UZB	Sanzhar Tursunov (to (Uzbekistan) Lokomotiv Tashkent)
—	DF	MDA	Simeon Bulgaru (to Volga Nizhny Novgorod)

=== Amkar Perm ===
In: Note: Flags indicate national team as defined under FIFA eligibility rules; some limited exceptions apply. Players may hold more than one non-FIFA nationality.

No.	Pos.	Nation	Player
9	MF	BUL	Blagoy Georgiev (from Terek Grozny)
15	FW	LVA	Vladimirs Kamešs (from (Latvia) Liepājas Metalurgs)
18	FW	RUS	Nikita Burmistrov (loan from Anzhi Makhachkala)
33	MF	CRO	Josip Knežević (end on loan to (Kazakhstan) FC Kairat)
99	FW	RUS	Maksim Kanunnikov (from Zenit Saint Petersburg)

Out: Note: Flags indicate national team as defined under FIFA eligibility rules; some limited exceptions apply. Players may hold more than one non-FIFA nationality.

No.	Pos.	Nation	Player
6	MF	SRB	Marko Blažić (to (Uzbekistan) FC Bunyodkor)
25	DF	UKR	Serhiy Garashchenkov (to (Ukraine) Karpaty Lviv)
33	MF	CRO	Josip Knežević (to (Kazakhstan) FC Kairat)
—	FW	RUS	Pavel Ignatovich (to Dynamo Moscow)
—	FW	RUS	Stanislav Matyash (on loan to (Bulgaria) Chernomorets Burgas)

=== Anzhi Makhachkala ===
In: Note: Flags indicate national team as defined under FIFA eligibility rules; some limited exceptions apply. Players may hold more than one non-FIFA nationality.

No.	Pos.	Nation	Player
2	DF	RUS	Andrey Yeshchenko (from Lokomotiv Moscow)
10	MF	BRA	Willian (from (Ukraine) Shakhtar Donetsk)
33	DF	BIH	Emir Spahić (on loan from (Spain) Sevilla FC)

Out: Note: Flags indicate national team as defined under FIFA eligibility rules; some limited exceptions apply. Players may hold more than one non-FIFA nationality.

No.	Pos.	Nation	Player
10	FW	RUS	Shamil Lakhiyalov (to Krylia Sovetov)
21	MF	RUS	Georgi Gabulov (to Alania Vladikavkaz)
22	MF	CGO	Christopher Samba (to (England) QPR)
81	FW	RUS	Nikita Burmistrov (on loan to Amkar Perm)

=== CSKA Moscow ===
In: Note: Flags indicate national team as defined under FIFA eligibility rules; some limited exceptions apply. Players may hold more than one non-FIFA nationality.

No.	Pos.	Nation	Player
9	FW	BRA	Vágner Love (from (Brazil) Flamengo)

Out: Note: Flags indicate national team as defined under FIFA eligibility rules; some limited exceptions apply. Players may hold more than one non-FIFA nationality.

No.	Pos.	Nation	Player
26	MF	LBR	Sekou Oliseh (on loan to (Greece) PAOK)
29	MF	KOR	Kim In-Sung (released)

=== Dynamo Moscow ===
In: Note: Flags indicate national team as defined under FIFA eligibility rules; some limited exceptions apply. Players may hold more than one non-FIFA nationality.

No.	Pos.	Nation	Player
—	FW	RUS	Pavel Ignatovich (from Amkar Perm)
—	DF	MDA	Alexandru Epureanu (end of loan to Krylia Sovetov)
—	FW	RUS	Sergei Davydov (on loan from Rubin Kazan)

Out: Note: Flags indicate national team as defined under FIFA eligibility rules; some limited exceptions apply. Players may hold more than one non-FIFA nationality.

No.	Pos.	Nation	Player
—	MF	BIH	Zvjezdan Misimović (to (China) Guizhou Renhe)
—	MF	ROU	Adrian Ropotan (to Volga Nizhny Novgorod)
—	DF	CRO	Gordon Schildenfeld (on loan to (Greece) PAOK)
—	MF	BLR	Pavel Nekhaichik (to (Belarus) BATE Borisov)
—	FW	RUS	Andrei Panyukov (on loan to FC Khimki)

=== FC Krasnodar ===
In: Note: Flags indicate national team as defined under FIFA eligibility rules; some limited exceptions apply. Players may hold more than one non-FIFA nationality.

No.	Pos.	Nation	Player
14	MF	BRA	Wánderson (previously on loan from (Sweden) GAIS)
—	MF	RUS	Sergei Petrov (from Krylia Sovetov)
—	GK	RUS	Aleksandr Filtsov (on loan from FC Lokomotiv Moscow)
—	MF	BRA	Isael (from (Portugal) Nacional da Madeira)
—	DF	CMR	Adolphe Teikeu (on loan from (Ukraine) Metalurh Zaporizhzhia)
—	MF	URU	Mauricio Pereyra (from (Argentina) Lanús)

Out: Note: Flags indicate national team as defined under FIFA eligibility rules; some limited exceptions apply. Players may hold more than one non-FIFA nationality.

No.	Pos.	Nation	Player
—	DF	BIH	Ognjen Vranješ (to FC Alania Vladikavkaz)
—	FW	ARM	Yura Movsisyan (to FC Spartak Moscow)
—	DF	GEO	Aleksandr Amisulashvili (to Krylia Sovetov)
—	MF	BLR	Syarhey Kislyak (end of loan from Rubin Kazan)
—	FW	RUS	Khyzyr Appayev (on loan to Rotor)
—	DF	RUS	Aleksandr Yerokhin (on loan to FC SKA-Energiya Khabarovsk)
—	GK	RUS	Igor Usminskiy (to Terek Grozny)

=== Krylia Sovetov Samara ===
In: Note: Flags indicate national team as defined under FIFA eligibility rules; some limited exceptions apply. Players may hold more than one non-FIFA nationality.

No.	Pos.	Nation	Player
—	FW	RUS	Shamil Lakhiyalov (from Anzhi Makhachkala)
—	DF	GEO	Aleksandr Amisulashvili (from FC Krasnodar)
—	MF	BLR	Stanislaw Drahun (from (Belarus) Dinamo Minsk)
—	DF	HAI	Réginal Goreux (from (Belgium) Standard Liège)
—	MF	RUS	Ilya Maksimov (from Volga Nizhny Novgorod)
—	DF	CMR	Benoît Angbwa (from FC Rostov)
—	MF	RUS	Emin Makhmudov (on loan from Spartak Moscow)
—	FW	RUS	Igor Portnyagin (on loan from Rubin Kazan)
—	MF	RUS	Viktor Kuzmichyov (from Rubin Kazan)
—	GK	RUS	Aleksandr Makarov (from Sibir Novosibirsk)

Out: Note: Flags indicate national team as defined under FIFA eligibility rules; some limited exceptions apply. Players may hold more than one non-FIFA nationality.

No.	Pos.	Nation	Player
—	DF	MDA	Alexandru Epureanu (end of loan from Dynamo Moscow)
—	FW	PAR	Pablo Zeballos (on loan to (Ecuador) Emelec)
—	GK	ALG	Raïs M'Bolhi (on loan to (France) Gazélec Ajaccio)
—	MF	RUS	Sergei Petrov (to FC Krasnodar)

=== Kuban Krasnodar ===
In: Note: Flags indicate national team as defined under FIFA eligibility rules; some limited exceptions apply. Players may hold more than one non-FIFA nationality.

No.	Pos.	Nation	Player
3	DF	NGA	Dele Adeleye (from (Ukraine) Tavriya)
4	DF	BRA	Xandão (from (Brazil) Desportivo Brasil)
31	MF	BRA	Leandro (on loan from (Ukraine) FC Arsenal Kyiv)
32	MF	KAZ	Bauyrzhan Islamkhan (from (Kazakhstan) FK Taraz)
34	MF	BFA	Charles Kaboré (from (France) Marseille)

Out: Note: Flags indicate national team as defined under FIFA eligibility rules; some limited exceptions apply. Players may hold more than one non-FIFA nationality.

No.	Pos.	Nation	Player
1	GK	MDA	Stanislav Namașco (to FC Volgar Astrakhan)
9	FW	RUS	Nikolai Zhilyayev (released)
18	DF	RUS	Anton Rogochiy (released)
26	DF	BRA	Zelão (to (Kazakhstan) Astana)
90	FW	RUS	Aleksandr Prudnikov (to Alania Vladikavkaz)

=== Lokomotiv Moscow ===
In: Note: Flags indicate national team as defined under FIFA eligibility rules; some limited exceptions apply. Players may hold more than one non-FIFA nationality.

No.	Pos.	Nation	Player
29	DF	UZB	Vitaliy Denisov (from (Ukraine) Dnipro Dnipropetrovsk)
55	DF	RUS	Renat Yanbaev (end of loan to Zenit Saint Petersburg)

Out: Note: Flags indicate national team as defined under FIFA eligibility rules; some limited exceptions apply. Players may hold more than one non-FIFA nationality.

No.	Pos.	Nation	Player
3	DF	SUI	Reto Ziegler (end of loan from (Italy) Juventus)
35	GK	RUS	Aleksandr Filtsov (on loan to FC Krasnodar)
50	DF	RUS	Andrey Yeshchenko (to Anzhi Makhachkala)
51	DF	RUS	Maksim Belyayev (on loan to FC Rostov)

=== Mordovia Saransk ===
In: Note: Flags indicate national team as defined under FIFA eligibility rules; some limited exceptions apply. Players may hold more than one non-FIFA nationality.

No.	Pos.	Nation	Player
—	DF	SRB	Milan Perendija (from (Romania) Oţelul Galaţi)
—	DF	MNE	Vladimir Božović (from (Romania) Rapid București)
—	FW	ROU	Daniel Oprița (from (Romania) Petrolul Ploiești)
—	DF	GEO	Akaki Khubutia (from (Romania) Gaz Metan Mediaș)

Out: Note: Flags indicate national team as defined under FIFA eligibility rules; some limited exceptions apply. Players may hold more than one non-FIFA nationality.

No.	Pos.	Nation	Player
—	DF	SRB	Aleksandar Simčević (to (Kazakhstan) FC Shakhter Karagandy)
—	FW	RUS	Maksim Zhestkov (to (Portugal) S.C. Braga)
—	DF	RUS	Aleksei Muldarov (released)

=== FC Rostov ===
In: Note: Flags indicate national team as defined under FIFA eligibility rules; some limited exceptions apply. Players may hold more than one non-FIFA nationality.

No.	Pos.	Nation	Player
27	MF	GAB	Guélor Kanga (from (Gabon) CF Mounana)
30	DF	RUS	Maksim Belyayev (on loan from FC Lokomotiv Moscow)
34	DF	RUS	Timofei Margasov (from FC Yenisey Krasnoyarsk)
77	FW	SRB	Danko Lazović (on loan from Zenit Saint Petersburg)

Out: Note: Flags indicate national team as defined under FIFA eligibility rules; some limited exceptions apply. Players may hold more than one non-FIFA nationality.

No.	Pos.	Nation	Player
15	DF	CMR	Benoît Angbwa (to Krylia Sovetov)
19	MF	BIH	Dragan Blatnjak (released)
20	MF	RUS	Sergey Belousov (on loan to Shinnik Yaroslavl)
21	MF	ENG	David Bentley (end of loan from (England) Tottenham Hotspur)

=== Rubin Kazan ===
In: Note: Flags indicate national team as defined under FIFA eligibility rules; some limited exceptions apply. Players may hold more than one non-FIFA nationality.

No.	Pos.	Nation	Player
15	MF	BLR	Syarhey Kislyak (end of loan to FC Krasnodar)
87	DF	AZE	Ruslan Abishov (from (Azerbaijan) Khazar Lankaran)
90	MF	FRA	Yann M'Vila (from (France) Stade Rennais)

Out: Note: Flags indicate national team as defined under FIFA eligibility rules; some limited exceptions apply. Players may hold more than one non-FIFA nationality.

No.	Pos.	Nation	Player
7	MF	RUS	Pyotr Bystrov (released)
9	FW	RUS	Sergei Davydov (on loan to Dynamo Moscow)
11	MF	BRA	Carlos Eduardo (on loan to (Brazil) Flamengo)
18	FW	PAR	Nelson Valdez (to (Spain) Valencia CF (previously on loan))
27	DF	ITA	Salvatore Bocchetti (to Spartak Moscow)
—	FW	RUS	Igor Portnyagin (on loan to Krylia Sovetov)

=== Spartak Moscow ===
In: Note: Flags indicate national team as defined under FIFA eligibility rules; some limited exceptions apply. Players may hold more than one non-FIFA nationality.

No.	Pos.	Nation	Player
12	FW	ARM	Yura Movsisyan (from Krasnodar)
28	FW	GHA	Waris Majeed (from (Sweden) BK Häcken)
33	DF	ITA	Salvatore Bocchetti (from Rubin Kazan)
90	MF	CRO	Ognjen Vukojević (on loan from (Ukraine) Dynamo Kyiv)

Out: Note: Flags indicate national team as defined under FIFA eligibility rules; some limited exceptions apply. Players may hold more than one non-FIFA nationality.

No.	Pos.	Nation	Player
4	MF	RUS	Emin Makhmudov (on loan to Krylia Sovetov)
11	FW	BRA	Welliton (Loan to (Brazil) Gremio)
20	MF	NED	Demy de Zeeuw (Loan to (Belgium) RSC Anderlecht)

=== Terek Grozny ===
In: Note: Flags indicate national team as defined under FIFA eligibility rules; some limited exceptions apply. Players may hold more than one non-FIFA nationality.

No.	Pos.	Nation	Player
1	GK	RUS	Igor Usminskiy (from FC Krasnodar)
4	DF	FIN	Juhani Ojala (from (Switzerland) Young Boys)
7	MF	URU	Facundo Píriz (from (Uruguay) Nacional)
20	MF	BRA	Kanu (from (Belgium) R.S.C. Anderlecht)

Out: Note: Flags indicate national team as defined under FIFA eligibility rules; some limited exceptions apply. Players may hold more than one non-FIFA nationality.

No.	Pos.	Nation	Player
1	GK	RUS	Soslan Dzhanayev (to FC Alania Vladikavkaz)
7	MF	BUL	Blagoy Georgiev (to FC Amkar Perm)
25	DF	POL	Piotr Polczak (on loan to Volga Nizhny Novgorod)

=== Volga Nizhny Novgorod ===
In: Note: Flags indicate national team as defined under FIFA eligibility rules; some limited exceptions apply. Players may hold more than one non-FIFA nationality.

No.	Pos.	Nation	Player
—	DF	MDA	Vitalie Bordian (from (Ukraine) Hoverla)
—	MF	ROU	Adrian Ropotan (from Dynamo Moscow)
—	MF	NED	Romeo Castelen (free agent)
—	MF	BLR	Anton Putsila (from (Germany) SC Freiburg)
—	DF	POL	Piotr Polczak (on loan from Terek Grozny)
—	DF	MDA	Simeon Bulgaru (from Alania Vladikavkaz)
—	DF	KGZ	Valerii Kichin (from (Kyrgyzstan) Dordoi)

Out: Note: Flags indicate national team as defined under FIFA eligibility rules; some limited exceptions apply. Players may hold more than one non-FIFA nationality.

No.	Pos.	Nation	Player
—	MF	RUS	Ilya Maksimov (to Krylia Sovetov)
—	MF	BIH	Mersudin Ahmetović (to FC Salyut Belgorod)
—	MF	RUS	Vladislav Ryzhkov (to FC Fakel Voronezh)
—	DF	ISR	Dani Bondar (released)

=== Zenit Saint Petersburg ===
In: Note: Flags indicate national team as defined under FIFA eligibility rules; some limited exceptions apply. Players may hold more than one non-FIFA nationality.

No.	Pos.	Nation	Player
13	DF	POR	Neto (from (Italy) Siena)
21	DF	SRB	Milan Rodić (from (Serbia) OFK Beograd)

Out: Note: Flags indicate national team as defined under FIFA eligibility rules; some limited exceptions apply. Players may hold more than one non-FIFA nationality.

No.	Pos.	Nation	Player
8	FW	SRB	Danko Lazović (on loan to Rostov)
22	GK	RUS	Dmitri Borodin (end of career)
55	DF	RUS	Renat Yanbaev (end of loan from Lokomotiv Moscow)
82	DF	DEN	Michael Lumb (to (Germany) VfL Bochum)
99	FW	RUS	Maksim Kanunnikov (to Amkar Perm)
