= 2011–12 in Russian football =

2011–12 season

2011-12 in Russian football refers to the events of all Russian teams in association football during the 2011–12 season.

== 2011–12 Russian Premier League ==
=== First phase ===
Pos	Team	Pld	W	D	L	GF	GA	GD	Pts	Qualification
1	Zenit St. Petersburg	30	17	10	3	59	25	+34	61	Qualification to Championship group
2	CSKA Moscow	30	16	11	3	58	29	+29	59	Qualification to Championship group
3	Dynamo Moscow	30	16	7	7	51	30	+21	55	Qualification to Championship group
4	Spartak Moscow	30	15	8	7	48	33	+15	53 (Note: Spartak Moscow ahead of Lokomotiv Moscow on head-to-head points; Lokomotiv Moscow–Spartak Moscow 0–2, Spartak Moscow–Lokomotiv Moscow 3–0.)	Qualification to Championship group
5	Lokomotiv Moscow	30	15	8	7	49	30	+19	53	Qualification to Championship group
6	Kuban Krasnodar	30	14	7	9	38	27	+11	49	Qualification to Championship group
7	Rubin Kazan	30	13	10	7	40	27	+13	49	Qualification to Championship group
8	Anzhi Makhachkala	30	13	9	8	38	32	+6	48	Qualification to Championship group
9	Krasnodar	30	10	8	12	38	43	−5	38	Qualification to Relegation group
10	Rostov	30	8	8	14	31	45	−14	32	Qualification to Relegation group
11	Terek Grozny	30	8	7	15	29	45	−16	31	Qualification to Relegation group
12	Volga Nizhny Novgorod	30	8	4	18	24	40	−16	28	Qualification to Relegation group
13	Amkar Perm	30	6	9	15	20	39	−19	27 (Note: Amkar Perm ahead of Krylia Sovetov on head-to-head points; Amkar Perm–Krylia Sovetov 1–1, Krylia Sovetov–Amkar Perm 1–1.)	Qualification to Relegation group
14	Krylia Sovetov Samara	30	6	9	15	21	43	−22	27	Qualification to Relegation group
15	Spartak Nalchik	30	5	9	16	23	40	−17	24	Qualification to Relegation group
16	Tom Tomsk	30	4	8	18	19	58	−39	20	Qualification to Relegation group

Source: Russian Premier League
Rules for classification: 1) points; 2) number of wins; 3) head-to-head points; 4) number of head-to-head wins; 5) head-to-head goal difference; 6) number of head-to-head goals scored; 7) number of head-to-head away goals scored; 8) goal difference; 9) number of goals scored; 10) number of away goals scored.

=== Championship group table ===
Pos	Team	Pld	W	D	L	GF	GA	GD	Pts	Qualification
1	Zenit St. Petersburg (C)	44	24	16	4	85	40	+45	88	Qualification to Champions League group stage
2	Spartak Moscow	44	21	12	11	69	47	+22	75	Qualification to Champions League play-off round
3	CSKA Moscow	44	19	16	9	72	47	+25	73	Qualification to Europa League play-off round
4	Dynamo Moscow	44	20	12	12	66	50	+16	72	Qualification to Europa League third qualifying round
5	Anzhi Makhachkala	44	19	13	12	54	42	+12	70	Qualification to Europa League second qualifying round
6	Rubin Kazan	44	17	17	10	55	41	+14	68	Qualification to Europa League group stage (Note: Rubin have won the 2011–12 Russian Cup and thus have qualified for the group stage of the 2012–13 UEFA Europa League.)
7	Lokomotiv Moscow	44	18	12	14	59	48	+11	66	
8	Kuban Krasnodar	44	15	16	13	50	45	+5	61	

Source: Russian Premier League
Rules for classification: 1) points; 2) number of wins; 3) head-to-head points; 4) number of head-to-head wins; 5) head-to-head goal difference; 6) number of head-to-head goals scored; 7) number of head-to-head away goals scored; 8) goal difference; 9) number of goals scored; 10) number of away goals scored
(C) Champions

=== Relegation group table ===
Pos	Team	Pld	W	D	L	GF	GA	GD	Pts	Qualification or relegation
9	Krasnodar	44	16	13	15	58	61	−3	61	
10	Amkar Perm	44	14	13	17	40	51	−11	55	
11	Terek Grozny	44	14	10	20	45	62	−17	52	
12	Krylia Sovetov Samara	44	12	15	17	33	50	−17	51	
13	Rostov (O)	44	12	12	20	45	61	−16	48	Qualification to Relegation play-offs
14	Volga Nizhny Novgorod (O)	44	12	5	27	37	60	−23	41	Qualification to Relegation play-offs
15	Tom Tomsk (R)	44	8	13	23	30	70	−40	37	Relegation to Football National League
16	Spartak Nalchik (R)	44	7	13	24	39	60	−21	34	Relegation to Football National League

Source: Russian Premier League
Rules for classification: 1) points; 2) number of wins; 3) head-to-head points; 4) number of head-to-head wins; 5) head-to-head goal difference; 6) number of head-to-head goals scored; 7) number of head-to-head away goals scored; 8) goal difference; 9) number of goals scored; 10) number of away goals scored
(O) Play-off winners; (R) Relegated

== 2011–12 Russian Football National League ==
=== First phase ===
Pos	Team	Pld	W	D	L	GF	GA	GD	Pts	Promotion or relegation
1	Alania Vladikavkaz	38	21	10	7	50	24	+26	73 (Note: Head-to-head record: Alania – Mordovia 4–0, Mordovia – Alania 1–2.)	Qualification for Championship group
2	Mordovia Saransk	38	21	10	7	64	44	+20	73	Qualification for Championship group
3	Shinnik Yaroslavl	38	21	6	11	61	42	+19	69	Qualification for Championship group
4	Nizhny Novgorod	38	21	5	12	53	40	+13	68	Qualification for Championship group
5	Sibir Novosibirsk	38	16	13	9	61	39	+22	61	Qualification for Championship group
6	Dynamo Bryansk	38	17	9	12	48	40	+8	60	Qualification for Championship group
7	Torpedo Moscow	38	16	12	10	50	30	+20	60	Qualification for Championship group
8	Ural Sverdlovsk Oblast	38	15	15	8	51	35	+16	60	Qualification for Championship group
9	KAMAZ Naberezhnye Chelny	38	17	8	13	48	36	+12	59	Qualification for Relegation group
10	Yenisey Krasnoyarsk	38	14	11	13	45	43	+2	53	Qualification for Relegation group
11	Khimki	38	13	9	16	47	61	−14	48	Qualification for Relegation group
12	Volgar-Gazprom Astrakhan	38	12	11	15	36	49	−13	47 (Note: Head-to-head record: Volgar-Gazprom – SKA 2–0, SKA – Volgar-Gazprom 1–1.)	Qualification for Relegation group
13	SKA-Khabarovsk	38	12	11	15	46	57	−11	47	Qualification for Relegation group
14	Torpedo Vladimir	38	12	7	19	45	61	−16	43	Qualification for Relegation group
15	Luch-Energiya Vladivostok	38	9	15	14	30	32	−2	42	Qualification for Relegation group
16	Chernomorets Novorossiysk	38	11	8	19	32	36	−4	41	Qualification for Relegation group
17	Baltika Kaliningrad	38	9	14	15	31	45	−14	41	Qualification for Relegation group
18	Gazovik Orenburg	38	8	14	16	40	48	−8	38	Qualification for Relegation group
19	Fakel Voronezh	38	6	12	20	26	46	−20	30	Qualification for Relegation group
20	Zhemchuzhina-Sochi (R)	38	8	2	28	22	81	−59	26	Excluded from professional football (Note: FC Zhemchuzhina-Sochi excluded from professional football for financial reasons.)

Source: FNL, Soccerway
Rules for classification: 1st points; 2nd matches won; 3rd head-to-head (points, matches won, goal difference, goals scored, away goals scored); 4th goal difference; 5th goals scored; 6th away goals scored
(R) Relegated

== 2011 Russian Super Cup ==
6 March 2011
13:00 MST

Zenit Saint Petersburg	1 – 0	CSKA Moscow
Ionov 57'	Report

Kuban Stadium, Krasnodar, Russia
Attendance: 22,500
Referee: Aleksei Nikolayev

== Europe 2010–11 ==
=== UEFA Champions League ===
==== Zenit Saint Petersburg ====
Team 1	Agg.	Team 2	1st leg	2nd leg
Zenit St. Petersburg (Russia)	1–2	(France) Auxerre	1–0	0–2

==== Rubin Kazan ====
Pos	Team	Pld	W	D	L	GF	GA	GD	Pts	Qualification	BAR	CPH	RUB	PAN
1	(Spain) Barcelona	6	4	2	0	14	3	+11	14	Advance to knockout phase	—	2–0	2–0	5–1
2	(Denmark) Copenhagen	6	3	1	2	7	5	+2	10	Advance to knockout phase	1–1	—	1–0	3–1
3	(Russia) Rubin Kazan	6	1	3	2	2	4	−2	6	Transfer to Europa League	1–1	1–0	—	0–0
4	(Greece) Panathinaikos	6	0	2	4	2	13	−11	2		0–3	0–2	0–0	—

Source: Soccerway

==== Spartak Moscow ====
Pos	Team	Pld	W	D	L	GF	GA	GD	Pts	Qualification	CHE	MAR	SPM	ZIL
1	(England) Chelsea	6	5	0	1	14	4	+10	15	Advance to knockout phase	—	2–0	4–1	2–1
2	(France) Marseille	6	4	0	2	12	3	+9	12	Advance to knockout phase	1–0	—	0–1	1–0
3	(Russia) Spartak Moscow	6	3	0	3	7	10	−3	9	Transfer to Europa League	0–2	0–3	—	3–0
4	(Slovakia) Žilina	6	0	0	6	3	19	−16	0		1–4	0–7	1–2	—

Source: Soccerway

=== UEFA Europa League ===
==== Rubin Kazan ====
Team 1	Agg.	Team 2	1st leg	2nd leg
Rubin Kazan (Russia)	2–4	(Netherlands) Twente	0–2	2–2

==== CSKA Moscow ====
Team 1	Agg.	Team 2	1st leg	2nd leg
CSKA Moscow (Russia)	1–3	(Portugal) Porto	0–1	1–2

==== Zenit Saint Petersburg ====
Team 1	Agg.	Team 2	1st leg	2nd leg
Twente (Netherlands)	3–2	(Russia) Zenit Saint Petersburg	3–0	0–2

==== Spartak Moscow ====
Team 1	Agg.	Team 2	1st leg	2nd leg
Porto (Portugal)	10–3	(Russia) Spartak Moscow	5–1	5–2

== Europe 2011–12 ==
=== UEFA Champions League ===
==== Rubin Kazan ====
Team 1	Agg.	Team 2	1st leg	2nd leg
Lyon (France)	4–2	(Russia) Rubin Kazan	3–1	1–1

==== Zenit St. Petersburg ====
Team 1	Agg.	Team 2	1st leg	2nd leg
Zenit St. Petersburg (Russia)	3–4	(Portugal) Benfica	3–2	0–2

==== CSKA Moscow ====
Team 1	Agg.	Team 2	1st leg	2nd leg
CSKA Moscow (Russia)	2–5	(Spain) Real Madrid	1–1	1–4

=== UEFA Europa League ===
==== Rubin Kazan ====
Team 1	Agg.	Team 2	1st leg	2nd leg
Rubin Kazan (Russia)	0–2	(Greece) Olympiacos	0–1	0–1

==== Lokomotiv Moscow ====
Team 1	Agg.	Team 2	1st leg	2nd leg
Lokomotiv Moscow (Russia)	2–2 (a)	(Spain) Athletic Bilbao	2–1	0–1
