= Yakov Zayka =

Russian footballer

Personal information
- Full name: Yakov Alekseyevich Zayka
- Date of birth: 1 March 1991 (age 35)
- Place of birth: Novorossiysk, Krasnodar Krai, Russian SFSR
- Height: 1.87 m (6 ft 1 1/2 in)
- Position: Midfielder

Youth career
- FC Chernomorets Novorossiysk

Senior career*
Years	Team	Apps	(Gls)
2008–2010	FC Krasnodar-2000	83	(7)
2011	FC Krasnodar	0	(0)
2012–2013	FC Shinnik Yaroslavl	11	(1)
2013	FC Slavyansky Slavyansk-na-Kubani	11	(0)
- * Club domestic league appearances and goals

Yakov Alekseyevich Zayka (Russian: Яков Алексеевич Зайка; born 1 March 1991) is a former Russian professional football player.

== Club career ==
He made his Russian Football National League debut for FC Shinnik Yaroslavl on 15 April 2012 in a game against FC Dynamo Bryansk. He also played in the FNL for Shinnik the following season (2012–13).
