= Aleksei Zolotarenko =

Russian footballer

Personal information
- Full name: Aleksei Yevgenyevich Zolotarenko
- Date of birth: 20 January 1993 (age 33)
- Place of birth: Krasnodar, Russia
- Height: 1.82 m (5 ft 11 1/2 in)
- Position: Forward

Youth career
- 2009–2010: Lokomotiv Saint Petersburg

Senior career*
Years	Team	Apps	(Gls)
2011	Krasnodar	0	(0)
2012	Volgar Astrakhan	0	(0)
2013	Rus Saint Petersburg	28	(6)
2014–2015	Dynamo Saint Petersburg	12	(1)
2016	Vitebsk	0	(0)
2017	ČSK Čelarevo	0	(0)
- * Club domestic league appearances and goals as of 7 February 2020

Aleksei Yevgenyevich Zolotarenko (Russian: Алексей Евгеньевич Золотаренко; born 20 January 1993) is a Russian former football forward.

== Career ==
He made his debut in the Russian Second Division for FC Rus Saint Petersburg on 20 April 2013 in a game against FC Lokomotiv-2 Moscow.

He joined Serbian club FK ČSK Čelarevo in the 2017–18 Serbian First League.
