= Rui Miguel (footballer, born 1983) =

Portuguese footballer

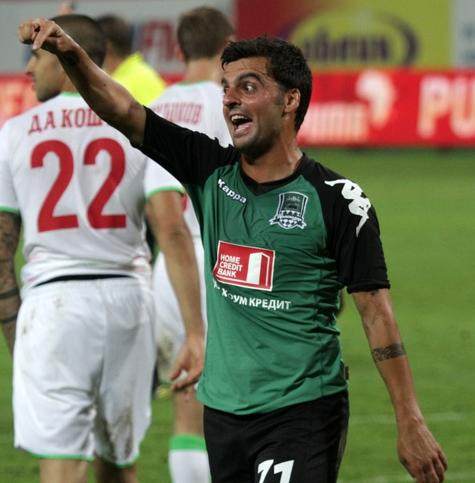
- Miguel with Krasnodar in 2011

Personal information
- Full name: Rui Miguel Melo Rodrigues
- Date of birth: 15 November 1983 (age 42)
- Place of birth: Viseu, Portugal
- Height: 1.75 m (5 ft 9 in)
- Position: Attacking midfielder

Youth career
- Freguesia Santiago
- 1996–1998: Fornos Algodres
- 1998–1999: Benfica
- 1999–2002: Académico Viseu

Senior career*
Years	Team	Apps	(Gls)
2001–2004	Académico Viseu	85	(18)
2004–2005	Covilhã	16	(8)
2005–2006	Naval	18	(0)
2006–2007	Nelas	8	(1)
2007–2008	Zagłębie Lubin	34	(7)
2008–2009	Paços Ferreira	24	(3)
2009–2011	Vitória Guimarães	42	(8)
2011	Krasnodar	4	(1)
2012	Astra Ploiești	5	(0)
2012–2013	AEL Limassol	16	(4)
2013–2014	Paços Ferreira	14	(0)
2014–2015	Rapid București	11	(0)
2015–2016	Zimbru Chișinău	21	(9)
2017–2019	Académico Viseu	33	(4)
2019–2020	Trofense	8	(1)
Total		339	(64)
- * Club domestic league appearances and goals

Rui Miguel Melo Rodrigues (born 15 November 1983), known as Rui Miguel, is a Portuguese former professional footballer who played as an attacking midfielder.

== Club career ==
Born in Viseu, Rui Miguel began playing for hometown's Académico FC, first appearing as a senior in the third division. In 2004, he stayed in that level, signing with S.C. Covilhã.

Rui Miguel moved to the Primeira Liga in the following season, with Associação Naval 1º de Maio. His competition debut took place on 22 August 2005 as he came on as a second-half substitute in a 2–0 away win against Vitória de Guimarães, and the vast majority of his appearances would also be from the bench, as on 26 August in the 2–3 home loss to FC Porto where he featured 35 minutes.

Rui Miguel started 2006–07 again in the third tier, with S.L. Nelas. However, in January 2007, he moved to Poland and signed with Zagłębie Lubin; he returned to his country one and a half years later, where he finally would make a name for himself in the top flight, first with F.C. Paços de Ferreira.

Rui Miguel signed with Vitória Guimarães for the 2009–10 campaign. Never an undisputed started except for the league's final games (four of his five goals came during that stretch), he contributed solidly as the Guimarães-based team finished sixth and nearly qualified for the UEFA Europa League, for example scoring a last-minute equaliser against eventually fourth-placed Sporting CP (1–1, at home).

After two seasons in Minho and 51 official appearances, Rui Miguel signed for Russian club FC Krasnodar.

== Honours ==
Zagłębie Lubin

- Ekstraklasa: 2006–07
- Polish Super Cup: 2007
