= Kuban Stadium =

Football stadium in Krasnodar, Russia

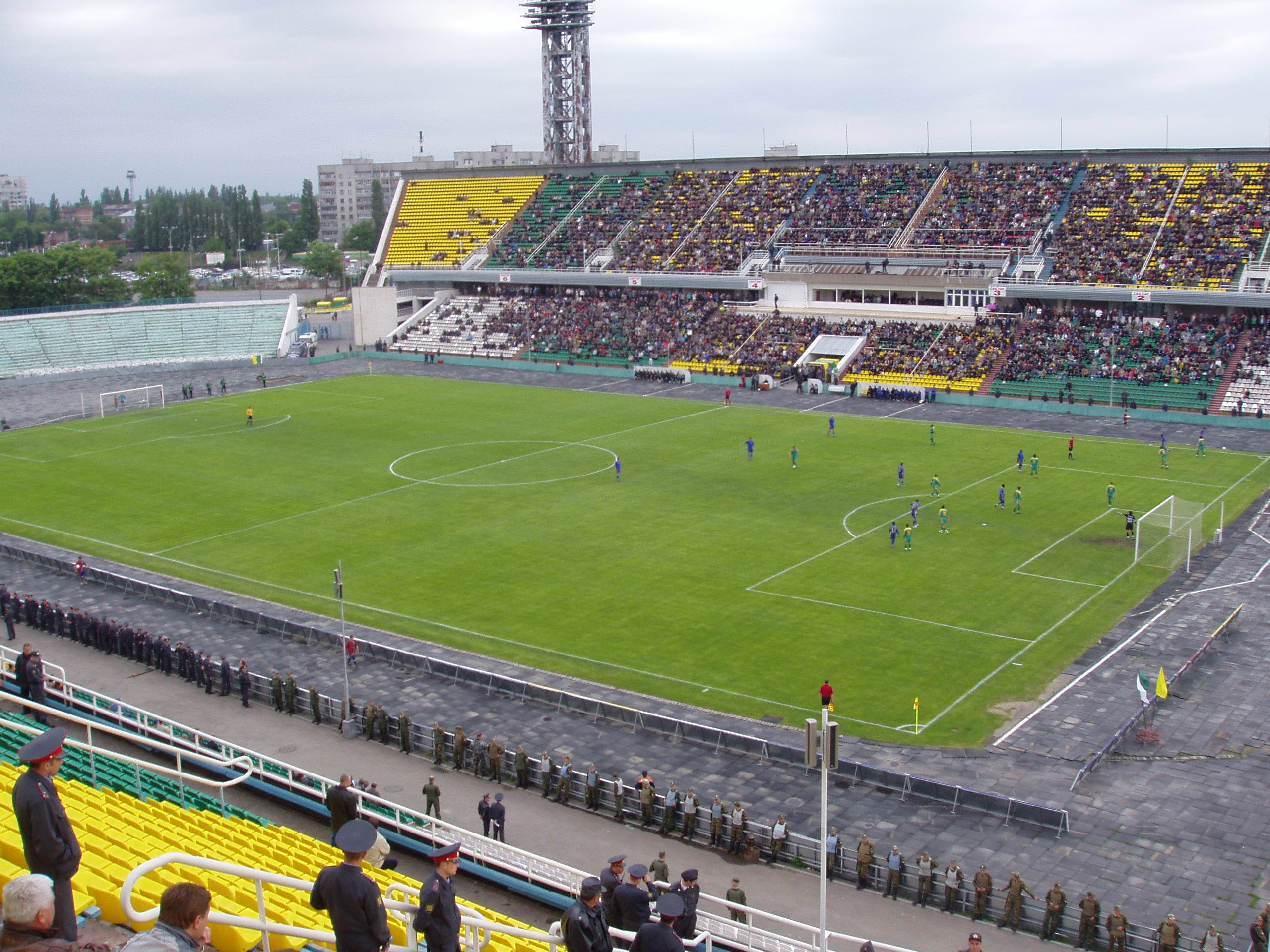
- 'Southern Derby' between FC Kuban Krasnodar and FC Rostov during the 2005 Russian Premier League
- Interactive map of Kuban Stadium
- Coordinates: 45°01′31″N 38°59′58″E
- Capacity: 31,654
- Surface: Grass

Construction
- Opened: 14 May 1961
- Renovated: 2016 (most recently)

Tenants
- FC Krasnodar (2009–2016); Women's football club Kubanochka (2018–2019); FC Kuban Krasnodar (1961–present); PFC Kuban Krasnodar (2018–present)

Kuban Stadium (Russian: «Кубань») is a multi-purpose stadium in Krasnodar, Russia. It is used mostly for football matches and is the home stadium of PFC Kuban Krasnodar, as well as the now-amateur FC Kuban Krasnodar. The stadium holds 31,654 people.

First opened on 30 October 1960, it initially had a capacity of approximately 20,000 people. The first match was played on 14 May 1961, when FC Kuban Krasnodar (then called Spartak Krasnodar) played PFC Dynamo Stavropol (then called Spartak Stavropol).

The capacity was later doubled with the building of a second floor, which is when floodlights were also installed.

== See also ==
- List of football stadiums in Russia
