= Márcio Abreu =

Portuguese footballer (born 1980)

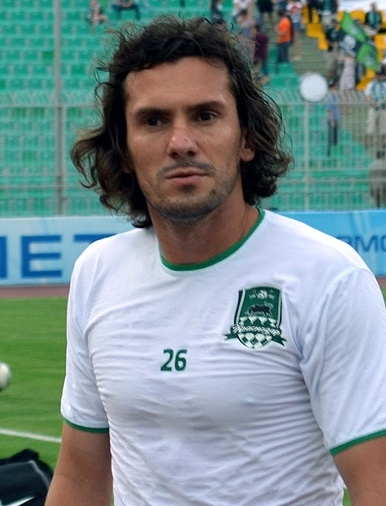
- Abreu with Krasnodar in 2011

Personal information
- Full name: Márcio Nuno Ornelas Abreu
- Date of birth: 25 April 1980 (age 46)
- Place of birth: Funchal, Portugal
- Height: 1.66 m (5 ft 5 in)
- Position: Winger

Youth career
- 1989–1999: Marítimo

Senior career*
Years	Team	Apps	(Gls)
1999–2004	Marítimo B	131	(11)
2000–2004	Marítimo	39	(2)
2004–2007	Camacha	84	(10)
2007–2011	Chernomorets	93	(6)
2011–2014	Krasnodar	89	(9)
2014	Torpedo Moscow	0	(0)
2016–2018	Camacha	38	(1)
2018–2020	1º Maio Funchal	31	(1)
Total		505	(40)
- * Club domestic league appearances and goals

Márcio Nuno Ornelas Abreu (born 25 April 1980) is a Portuguese former professional footballer who played as a winger.

== Football career ==
After arriving in 1989 at hometown's C.S. Marítimo, and going on to represent its every youth sides, Abreu never settled in the first team, constantly bouncing between that squad and the reserves. In 2004, he was released and joined Madeira neighbours A.D. Camacha in the third division, the same as Marítimo B.

Abreu signed in the summer of 2007 with Bulgarian club PSFC Chernomorets Burgas, being regularly used during his three-and-a-half-season spell. In February 2011 he was transferred to Russia's FC Krasnodar, freshly promoted to the Premier League.

On 6 February 2011, Abreu participated in his first game for his new team, playing the first 72 minutes in the 2–2 friendly draw with Ukraine's SC Tavriya Simferopol. His first official appearance came exactly one month later, against FC Amkar Perm for the campaign's Russian Cup (120 minutes played, 1–0 win); his league debut occurred six days later, in a 0–0 draw at FC Anzhi Makhachkala.

On 10 June 2011, Abreu scored his first goal for Krasnodar, in a 3–1 away success against FC Rostov. He left at the end of 2013–14, signing with fellow league club FC Torpedo Moscow shortly after but retiring from the game shortly after for family reasons.

After two years of inactivity, 36-year-old Abreu returned to football with former club Camacha, still in the third level.
