= Yevgeni Shipitsin =

Russian footballer

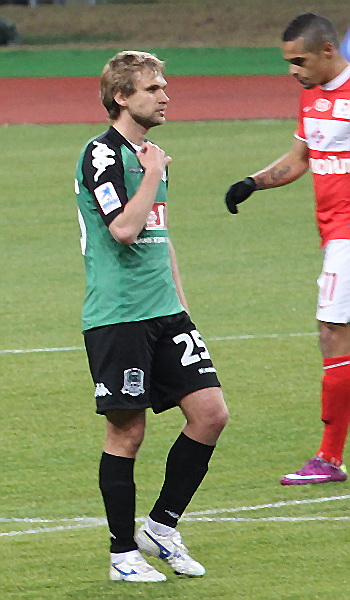

Personal information
- Full name: Yevgeni Fyodorovich Shipitsin
- Date of birth: 16 January 1985 (age 41)
- Place of birth: Perm, Russian SFSR
- Height: 1.77 m (5 ft 10 in)
- Position: Midfielder

Senior career*
Years	Team	Apps	(Gls)
2003–2006	Amkar Perm	0	(0)
2005	→ Sokol Saratov (loan)	20	(5)
2006	→ Salyut-Energia Belgorod (loan)	16	(0)
2007–2010	Salyut Belgorod	134	(7)
2010–2015	Krasnodar	78	(13)
2015–2016	Mordovia Saransk	13	(0)
2016	Sochi	9	(0)
2017–2018	Taraz	31	(0)

International career
2011	Russia-2	1	(0)
- * Club domestic league appearances and goals

Yevgeni Fyodorovich Shipitsin (Russian: Евгений Фёдорович Шипицин; born 16 January 1985) is a Russian former professional football player.
