= Igor Usminskiy =

Russian footballer

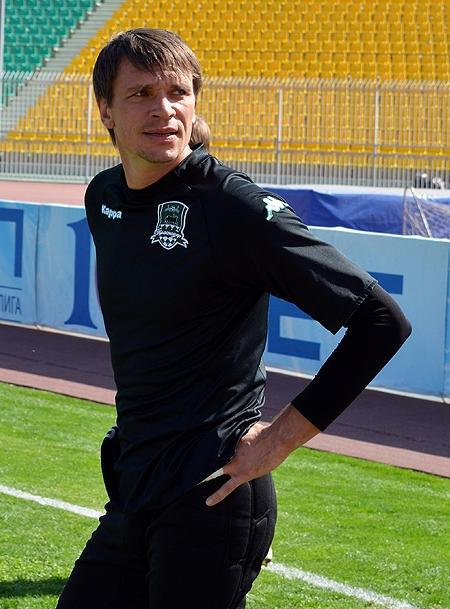
- With FC Krasnodar in 2011

Personal information
- Full name: Igor Vladimirovich Usminskiy
- Date of birth: 23 April 1977 (age 49)
- Place of birth: Grozny, Russian SFSR
- Height: 1.87 m (6 ft 1 1/2 in)
- Position: Goalkeeper

Senior career*
| Years | Team | Apps | (Gls) |
| 1995–1996 | FC Zhemchuzhina-d Sochi | 38 | (0) |
| 1996 | FC Zhemchuzhina Sochi | 1 | (0) |
| 1997 | FC Kuban Slavyansk-na-Kubani | 3 | (0) |
| 1998–2002 | FC Chernomorets Novorossiysk | 49 | (0) |
| 2000 | FC Chernomorets-2 Novorossiysk | 2 | (0) |
| 2003 | FC Terek Grozny | 35 | (0) |
| 2004 | FC Chernomorets Novorossiysk | 31 | (0) |
| 2005–2006 | FC Volgar-Gazprom Astrakhan | 49 | (0) |
| 2007–2008 | FC SKA Rostov-on-Don | 50 | (0) |
| 2008–2010 | FC Amkar Perm | 24 | (0) |
| 2011–2013 | FC Krasnodar | 10 | (0) |
| 2013 | Terek Grozny | 0 | (0) |
- * Club domestic league appearances and goals

Igor Vladimirovich Usminskiy (Russian: Игорь Владимирович Усминский; born 23 April 1977) is a former Russian professional footballer.

== Club career ==
He made his professional debut in the Russian Premier League in 1996 for FC Zhemchuzhina Sochi.

== Honours ==
- Russian Cup winner: 2004 (played in the early stages of the 2003–04 tournament for FC Terek Grozny).
