= Oleg Samsonov =

Russian footballer

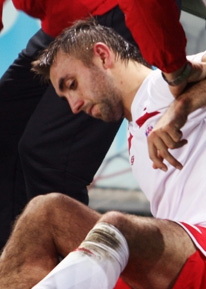

Personal information
- Full name: Oleg Ivanovich Samsonov
- Date of birth: 7 September 1987 (age 39)
- Place of birth: Novovoronezh, Soviet Union
- Height: 1.74 m (5 ft 8 1/2 in)
- Position: Midfielder

Youth career
- Atom Novovoronezh
- Fakel Voronezh
- Akademika Moscow

Senior career*
Years	Team	Apps	(Gls)
2004–2005	Sportakademklub Moscow	32	(1)
2006–2009	Zenit Saint Petersburg	0	(0)
2007–2008	→ Spartak Nalchik (loan)	48	(3)
2009	→ FC Khimki (loan)	10	(0)
2009	→ Spartak Nalchik (loan)	10	(0)
2010–2011	Krylia Sovetov Samara	36	(3)
2011–2014	FC Krasnodar	17	(1)
2013–2014	FC Krasnodar-2	10	(4)
2014–2015	FC Tyumen	19	(0)
2015	Fakel Voronezh	11	(0)

International career
2005	Russia U-19	3	(2)
2007–2008	Russia U-21	10	(0)
2011	Russia-2	2	(1)
- * Club domestic league appearances and goals

Oleg Ivanovich Samsonov (Russian: Оле́г Ива́нович Самсо́нов; born 7 September 1987) is a Russian former footballer.

== Career ==
He made his Russian Premier League debut for PFC Spartak Nalchik on 5 May 2007 in a game against FC Dynamo Moscow.

The promising youngster spent the 2007 and 2008 seasons on loan at FC Spartak Nalchik and moved on 20 December 2008 from FC Zenit Saint Petersburg to FC Khimki on loan .
