= Igor Lambarschi =

Moldovan-Russian footballer

Personal information
- Full name: Igor Anatolyevich Lambarskiy
- Date of birth: 26 November 1992 (age 33)
- Place of birth: Edineț, Moldova
- Height: 1.78 m (5 ft 10 in)
- Position: Midfielder

Team information
- Current team: Dacia Buiucani
- Number: 17

Youth career
- Academia UTM

Senior career*
Years	Team	Apps	(Gls)
2008–2011	Academia UTM	84	(6)
2012–2014	Krasnodar	18	(1)
2013–2014	→ Yenisey Krasnoyarsk (loan)	13	(3)
2014–2015	Ural Yekaterinburg	0	(0)
2015	→ Tyumen (loan)	9	(0)
2016–2018	Nizhny Novgorod	60	(8)
2019	Urozhay Krasnodar	12	(1)
2019	Olimp Khimki	14	(1)
2020	Mashuk-KMV	10	(0)
2021–2025	Milsami Orhei	84	(10)
2025–	Dacia Buiucani	22	(2)

International career
2011	Moldova U-21	5	(0)
2012–2014	Russia U-21	12	(0)
- * Club domestic league appearances and goals as of 1 June 2026

Igor Lambarschi (Russian: Игорь Анатольевич Ламбарский, romanized: Igor Anatolyevich Lambarsky); born 26 November 1992) is a professional football player who plays as a midfielder for Moldovan Liga club Dacia Buiucani.

== Club career ==
He made his Russian Premier League debut for Krasnodar on 5 March 2012 in a match against Rostov.

== International career ==
After previously representing the Moldova U-21 team, he acquired Russian citizenship and was called up to the Russia U-21 team in August 2012.
