= Vladimir Tatarchuk (footballer, born 1987) =

Russian footballer

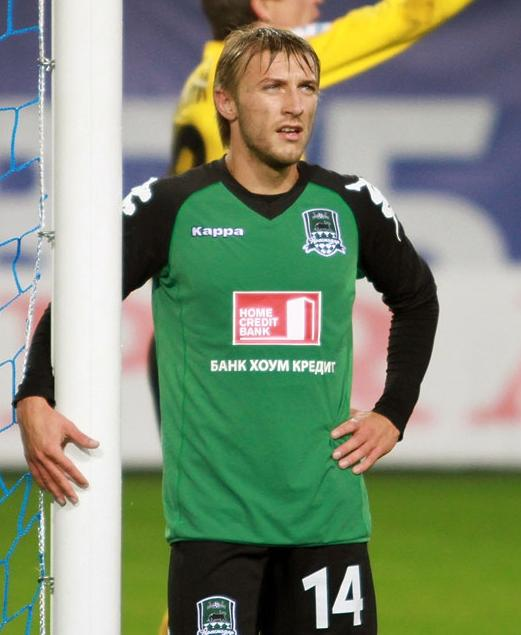
- Tatarchuk with FC Krasnodar in 2011

Personal information
- Full name: Vladimir Vladimirovich Tatarchuk
- Date of birth: 20 September 1987 (age 39)
- Place of birth: Moscow, Russian SFSR
- Height: 1.68 m (5 ft 6 in)
- Position: Midfielder

Youth career
- PFC CSKA Moscow

Senior career*
Years	Team	Apps	(Gls)
2004–2007	PFC CSKA Moscow	0	(0)
2008–2012	FC Krasnodar	105	(11)
2012	PFC Spartak Nalchik	19	(0)
2013	FC Torpedo Moscow	5	(0)
2013–2014	FC Fakel Voronezh	20	(1)
2015	FC Fakel Voronezh	0	(0)
2015–2016	FC Zenit Penza	6	(0)
2016	FC Sochi	8	(0)
- * Club domestic league appearances and goals

Vladimir Vladimirovich Tatarchuk (Russian: Владимир Владимирович Татарчук; born 20 September 1987) is a former Russian professional footballer.

He made his professional debut in the Russian Second Division in 2008 for FC Krasnodar.

He is a son of Vladimir Tatarchuk.

== Honours ==
- Russian Cup winner: 2006 (played 2 games in the tournament).
