= 2010 PFC CSKA Moscow season =

CSKA Moscow
2010 season
- Chairman: Yevgeni Giner
- Manager: Leonid Slutsky
- Stadium: Luzhniki Stadium
- Russian Premier League: 2nd
- Super Cup: Runners-up
- Russian Cup: Round of 16 vs Zenit Saint Petersburg
- Champions League: Quarter-finals vs Internazionale
- Europa League: Progressed to 2011–12 season
- Russian Cup: Progressed to 2011–12 season
- Top goalscorer: League: Vágner Love (9); All: Tomáš Necid (13)
| Home colours | Away colours |

The 2010 CSKA season was the 19th successive season that the club will play in the Russian Premier League, the highest tier of association football in Russia.

== Squad ==
As of match played 15 December 2010

| Number | Name | Nationality | Position | Date of birth (age) | Signed from | Signed in | Contract ends | Apps. | Goals |
Goalkeepers
| 1 | Sergei Chepchugov | (Russia) | GK | 15 July 1985 (aged 25) | Sibir Novosibirsk | 2010 | | 3 | 0 |
| 35 | Igor Akinfeev (captain) | (Russia) | GK | 8 April 1986 (aged 24) | Academy | 2003 | | 293 | 0 |
| 37 | Ivan Skripnik | (Russia) | GK | 10 August 1992 (aged 18) | Academy | 2009 | | 0 | 0 |
| 38 | Vyacheslav Isupov | (Russia) | GK | 16 January 1993 (aged 17) | Academy | 2010 | | 0 | 0 |
| 40 | Stanislav Plokhikh | (Russia) | GK | 10 February 1992 (aged 18) | Academy | 2009 | | 0 | 0 |
| 77 | Artur Nigmatullin | (Russia) | GK | 17 May 1991 (aged 19) | Luch-Energiya Vladivostok | 2008 | | 0 | 0 |
Defenders
| 2 | Deividas Šemberas | (Lithuania) | DF | 2 August 1978 (aged 32) | Dynamo Moscow | 2002 | | 328 | 1 |
| 4 | Sergei Ignashevich | (Russia) | DF | 14 July 1979 (aged 31) | Lokomotiv Moscow | 2004 | | 272 | 25 |
| 6 | Aleksei Berezutski | (Russia) | DF | 20 June 1982 (aged 28) | Chernomorets Novorossiysk | 2001 | | 316 | 8 |
| 14 | Kirill Nababkin | (Russia) | DF | 8 September 1986 (aged 24) | Moscow | 2010 | | 17 | 0 |
| 15 | Chidi Odiah | (Nigeria) | DF | 17 December 1983 (aged 26) | Sheriff Tiraspol | 2004 | | 119 | 5 |
| 24 | Vasili Berezutski | (Russia) | DF | 20 June 1982 (aged 28) | Torpedo-ZIL | 2002 | | 280 | 9 |
| 34 | Aleksei Nikitin | (Russia) | DF | 27 January 1992 (aged 18) | Academy | 2009 | | 0 | 0 |
| 42 | Georgi Shchennikov | (Russia) | DF | 27 April 1991 (aged 19) | Academy | 2008 | | 81 | 0 |
| 47 | Kirill Suslov | (Russia) | DF | 27 January 1992 (aged 18) | Prialit Reutov | 2010 | | 0 | 0 |
| 54 | Uroš Ćosić | (Serbia) | DF | 24 October 1992 (aged 18) | Red Star Belgrade | 2009 | | 0 | 0 |
| 56 | Anatoli Stukalov | (Russia) | DF | 2 March 1992 (aged 18) | Academy | 2010 | | 0 | 0 |
| 59 | Semyon Fedotov | (Russia) | DF | 2 March 1992 (aged 18) | Academy | 2009 | | 1 | 0 |
| 90 | Anton Polyutkin | (Russia) | DF | 2 February 1993 (aged 17) | Academy | 2010 | | 0 | 0 |
| 92 | Pyotr Ten | (Russia) | DF | 12 July 1992 (aged 18) | Academy | 2010 | | 0 | 0 |
Midfielders
| 7 | Keisuke Honda | (Japan) | MF | 13 June 1986 (aged 24) | VVV-Venlo | 2010 | 2013 | 40 | 6 |
| 10 | Alan Dzagoev | (Russia) | MF | 17 June 1990 (aged 20) | Krylia Sovetov-SOK Dimitrovgrad | 2008 | | 104 | 31 |
| 11 | Pavel Mamayev | (Russia) | MF | 17 September 1988 (aged 22) | Torpedo Moscow | 2007 | | 108 | 4 |
| 13 | Mark González | (Chile) | MF | 10 July 1984 (aged 26) | Real Betis | 2009 | 2014 | 40 | 8 |
| 21 | Zoran Tošić | (Serbia) | MF | 28 April 1987 (aged 23) | Manchester United | 2010 | 2015 | 23 | 6 |
| 22 | Evgeni Aldonin | (Russia) | MF | 22 January 1980 (aged 30) | Rotor Volgograd | 2004 | | 268 | 13 |
| 25 | Elvir Rahimić | (Bosnia and Herzegovina) | MF | 4 April 1976 (aged 34) | Anzhi Makhachkala | 2001 | | 331 | 4 |
| 26 | Sekou Oliseh | (Liberia) | MF | 5 June 1990 (aged 20) | Midtjylland | 2010 | 2015 | 30 | 5 |
| 32 | Kirill Lapidus | (Russia) | MF | 12 February 1991 (aged 19) | Moscow | 2010 | | 0 | 0 |
| 36 | Yegor Ivanov | (Russia) | MF | 19 June 1992 (aged 18) | Academy | 2010 | | 0 | 0 |
| 43 | Leonid Mushnikov | (Russia) | MF | 30 December 1992 (aged 17) | Academy | 2010 | | 0 | 0 |
| 44 | Dmitriy Zameshayev | (Russia) | MF | 14 May 1991 (aged 19) | Academy | 2009 | | 0 | 0 |
| 46 | Aleksandr Stolyarenko | (Russia) | MF | 18 January 1991 (aged 19) | Togliatti | 2009 | | 0 | 0 |
| 48 | Artyom Popov | (Russia) | MF | 30 August 1992 (aged 18) | Academy | 2010 | | 0 | 0 |
| 49 | Aleksandr Vasilyev | (Russia) | MF | 23 January 1991 (aged 19) | Academy | 2009 | | 1 | 0 |
| 51 | Aleksei Kiselyov | (Russia) | MF | 1 May 1992 (aged 18) | Academy | 2009 | | 0 | 0 |
| 60 | Nika Dzalamidze | (Georgia (country)) | MF | 6 January 1992 (aged 18) | loan from Baia Zugdidi | 2010 | | 0 | 0 |
| 66 | Igor Dragunov | (Russia) | MF | 6 April 1991 (aged 19) | Academy | 2008 | | 0 | 0 |
| 67 | Armen Ambartsumyan | (Russia) | MF | 11 April 1994 (aged 16) | Academy | 2010 | | 0 | 0 |
| 88 | Leonid Rodionov | (Russia) | MF | 12 January 1993 (aged 17) | Academy | 2010 | | 0 | 0 |
| 93 | Gela Zaseyev | (Russia) | MF | 20 January 1993 (aged 17) | Academy | 2010 | | 0 | 0 |
| 99 | Yevgeni Kobzar | (Russia) | MF | 9 August 1992 (aged 18) | Academy | 2009 | | 0 | 0 |
Forwards
| 8 | Seydou Doumbia | (Ivory Coast) | FW | 31 December 1987 (aged 22) | Young Boys | 2010 | 2015 | 15 | 12 |
| 9 | Vágner Love | (Brazil) | FW | 11 June 1984 (aged 26) | Palmeiras | 2004 | | 203 | 106 |
| 53 | Sergei Sipatov | (Russia) | FW | 8 February 1993 (aged 17) | Moscow | 2010 | | 0 | 0 |
| 58 | Mukhammad Sultonov | (Russia) | FW | 22 December 1992 (aged 17) | Academy | 2010 | | 0 | 0 |
| 61 | Serder Serderov | (Russia) | FW | 10 March 1994 (aged 16) | Academy | 2010 | | 0 | 0 |
| 79 | Konstantin Bazelyuk | (Russia) | FW | 12 April 1993 (aged 17) | Academy | 2010 | | 0 | 0 |
| 88 | Tomáš Necid | (Czech Republic) | FW | 13 August 1989 (aged 21) | Slavia Prague | 2009 | | 73 | 24 |
Away on loan
| | Veniamin Mandrykin | (Russia) | GK | 30 August 1981 (aged 29) | Alania Vladikavkaz | 2002 | | 95 | 0 |
| | Yevgeny Pomazan | (Russia) | GK | 31 January 1989 (aged 21) | Kuban Krasnodar | 2008 | | 3 | 0 |
| | Anton Grigoryev | (Russia) | DF | 13 December 1985 (aged 25) | Academy | 2004 | | 57 | 0 |
| | Andrei Vasyanovich | (Russia) | DF | 13 June 1988 (aged 22) | Moscow | 2010 | | 0 | 0 |
| | Anton Vlasov | (Russia) | DF | 11 May 1989 (aged 21) | Krylia Sovetov-SOK Dimitrovgrad | 2008 | | 0 | 0 |
| | Ramón | (Brazil) | MF | 24 May 1988 (aged 22) | Corinthians | 2007 | | 34 | 2 |
| | Luboš Kalouda | (Czech Republic) | MF | 20 May 1987 (aged 23) | 1.FC Brno | 2008 | | 8 | 0 |
| | Nika Piliyev | (Russia) | MF | 21 March 1991 (aged 19) | Lokomotiv Moscow | 2009 | | 7 | 0 |
| | Maksim Fyodorov | (Russia) | MF | 5 April 1989 (aged 21) | Togliatti | 2009 | | 0 | 0 |
| | Aleksandr Kudryavtsev | (Russia) | FW | 9 June 1990 (aged 20) | Academy | 2008 | | 0 | 0 |
| | Ricardo Jesus | (Brazil) | FW | 16 May 1985 (aged 25) | Spartak Nalchik | 2008 | | 19 | 2 |
| | Moussa Maâzou | (Niger) | FW | 25 August 1988 (aged 22) | Lokeren | 2009 | | 19 | 3 |
| | Dawid Janczyk | (Poland) | FW | 23 September 1987 (aged 23) | Legia Warsaw | 2007 | | 22 | 3 |
| | Dmitri Ryzhov | (Russia) | FW | 26 August 1989 (aged 21) | Krylia Sovetov-SOK Dimitrovgrad | 2008 | | 15 | 0 |
| 91 | Anton Zabolotny | (Russia) | FW | 13 June 1991 (aged 19) | Metallurg Lipetsk | 2004 | | 0 | 0 |
Players that left during the season
| 17 | Miloš Krasić | (Serbia) | MF | 1 November 1984 (aged 26) | Vojvodina | 2004 | | 228 | 33 |
| 20 | Guilherme | (Brazil) | FW | 22 October 1988 (aged 22) | loan from Dynamo Kyiv | 2009 | 2010 | 20 | 10 |

=== Out on loan ===
Note: Flags indicate national team as defined under FIFA eligibility rules; some limited exceptions apply. Players may hold more than one non-FIFA nationality.

| No. | Pos. | Nation | Player |
|---|---|---|---|
| — | GK | RUS | Veniamin Mandrykin (at (Russia) Dynamo Bryansk) |
| — | GK | RUS | Yevgeny Pomazan (at (Russia) Ural Sverdlovsk) |
| — | DF | RUS | Anton Grigoryev (at (Russia) Kuban Krasnodar) |
| — | DF | RUS | Andrei Vasyanovich (at (Russia) Spartak Nalchik) |
| — | DF | RUS | Anton Vlasov (at (Russia) Anzhi Makhachkala) |
| — | MF | BRA | Ramón (at (Brazil) Flamengo) |
| — | MF | CZE | Luboš Kalouda (at (Russia) Volgar-Gazprom Astrakhan) |

| No. | Pos. | Nation | Player |
|---|---|---|---|
| — | MF | RUS | Nika Piliyev (at (Russia) Amkar Perm) |
| — | MF | RUS | Maksim Fyodorov (at (Russia) Dynamo Bryansk) |
| — | FW | BRA | Ricardo Jesus (at (Russia) Spartak Nalchik) |
| — | FW | NIG | Moussa Maâzou (at (France) Bordeaux) |
| — | FW | POL | Dawid Janczyk (at (Belgium) Germinal Beerschot) |
| — | FW | RUS | Aleksandr Kudryavtsev (at (Russia) Shinnik Yaroslavl) |
| — | FW | RUS | Dmitri Ryzhov (at (Russia) Ural Sverdlovsk) |

== Transfers ==
=== In ===
| Date | Position | Nationality | Name | From | Fee | Ref. |
|---|---|---|---|---|---|---|
| 11 December 2009 | MF | (Liberia) | Sekou Oliseh | Midtjylland | Undisclosed | |
| 23 December 2009 | GK | (Russia) | Sergei Chepchugov | Sibir Novosibirsk | Undisclosed | |
| 23 December 2009 | DF | (Russia) | Kirill Nababkin | FC Moscow | Undisclosed | |
| 1 January 2010 | MF | (Japan) | Keisuke Honda | VVV-Venlo | Undisclosed | |
| 1 January 2010 | DF | (Russia) | Kirill Suslov | Prialit Reutov | Undisclosed | |
| 1 January 2010 | MF | (Russia) | Kirill Lapidus | FC Moscow | Undisclosed | |
| 1 January 2010 | MF | (Georgia (country)) | Nika Dzalamidze | Baia Zugdidi | Undisclosed | |
| 9 March 2010 | DF | (Russia) | Andrei Vasyanovich | FC Moscow | Undisclosed | |
| 23 March 2010 | MF | (Russia) | Sergei Sipatov | FC Moscow | Undisclosed | |
| 15 June 2010 | MF | (Serbia) | Zoran Tošić | Manchester United | Undisclosed | |
| 1 July 2010 | FW | (Ivory Coast) | Seydou Doumbia | Young Boys | Undisclosed | |

=== Out ===
| Date | Position | Nationality | Name | To | Fee | Ref. |
|---|---|---|---|---|---|---|
| 28 May 2010 | MF | (Brazil) | Daniel Carvalho | Atlético Mineiro | Undisclosed | |
| 19 August 2010 | MF | (Serbia) | Miloš Krasić | Juventus | Undisclosed | |

=== Loans out ===
| Date from | Position | Nationality | Name | To | Date to | Ref. |
|---|---|---|---|---|---|---|
| 1 January 2010 | FW | (Poland) | Dawid Janczyk | Germinal Beerschot | 1 October 2010 | |
| 12 January 2010 | FW | (Niger) | Moussa Maâzou | AS Monaco | 1 July 2010 | |
| 12 January 2010 | MF | (Brazil) | Daniel Carvalho | Al-Arabi | 28 May 2010 | |
| 12 January 2010 | MF | (Brazil) | Ricardo Jesus | AEL | 1 July 2010 | |
| 15 January 2010 | FW | (Brazil) | Vágner Love | Flamengo | 1 July 2010 | |
| 26 January 2010 | FW | (Russia) | Aleksandr Kudryavtsev | Shinnik Yaroslavl | 15 August 2010 | |
| 1 February 2010 | FW | (Russia) | Dmitri Ryzhov | Ural | Season Long | |
| 4 August 2010 | DF | (Russia) | Andrei Vasyanovich | Spartak Nalchik | End of Season | |
| 6 August 2010 | MF | (Russia) | Nika Piliyev | Amkar Perm | End of Season | |
| 16 August 2010 | FW | (Russia) | Aleksandr Kudryavtsev | FC Tyumen | End of Season | |
| 25 August 2010 | FW | (Niger) | Moussa Maâzou | Bordeaux | 1 July 2011 | |

== Competitions ==
=== Russian Super Cup ===
| 7 March 2010 | Rubin Kazan | 1 – 0 | CSKA Moscow | Moscow |
| 14:00 MSK (UTC+3) | Bukharov 35'; Kabze (yellow card) 56'; Ryzhikov (yellow card) 90' | Report | Šemberas (yellow card) 48'; Mamayev (yellow card) 65'; Honda (yellow card) 68' | Stadium: Luzhniki Stadium; Attendance: 17,000; Referee: Stanislav Sukhina |

=== UEFA Champions League ===
==== Knockout phase ====
| 24 February 2010 Round of 16 1st leg | CSKA Moscow (Russia) | 1 – 1 | (Spain) Sevilla | Moscow, Russia |
| 20:30 MSK (UTC+3) | González 66' (yellow card) 80'; Aldonin (yellow card) 78'; Honda (yellow card) 82' | Report | Negredo 25' | Stadium: Luzhniki Stadium; Attendance: 28,600; Referee: Felix Brych (Germany) |

| 16 March 2010 Round of 16 2nd leg | Sevilla (Spain) | 1 – 2 (2 – 3 agg.) | (Russia) CSKA Moscow | Seville, Spain |
| 22:45 MSK (UTC+3) | Perotti 41'; Luís Fabiano (yellow card) 52' | Report | A.Berezutski (yellow card) 20'; Necid 39'; Honda 55'; Shchennikov (yellow card) 61'; González (yellow card) 70'; Šemberas (yellow card) 71' | Stadium: Ramón Sánchez Pizjuán Stadium; Attendance: 29,666; Referee: Viktor Kassai (Hungary) |

| 31 March 2010 Quarterfinal 1st leg | Internazionale (Italy) | 1 – 0 | (Russia) CSKA Moscow | Milan, Italy |
| 22:45 MSK (UTC+3) | Materazzi (yellow card) 12'; Milito 65' | Report | Krasić (yellow card) 32'; Aldonin (yellow card) 37' | Stadium: San Siro; Attendance: 69,398; Referee: Howard Webb (England) |

| 6 April 2010 Quarterfinal 2nd leg | CSKA Moscow (Russia) | 0 – 1 (0 – 2 agg.) | (Italy) Internazionale | Moscow, Russia |
| 20:30 MSK (UTC+3) | Odiah (yellow card) 38' (yellow-red card) 49'; Mamayev (yellow card) 63' | Report | Sneijder 6'; Stanković (yellow card) 16' | Stadium: Luzhniki Stadium; Attendance: 54,400; Referee: Stéphane Lannoy (France) |

=== Russian Premier League ===
==== Results by round ====
| Round | 1 | 2 | 3 | 4 | 5 | 6 | 7 | 8 | 9 | 10 | 11 | 12 | 13 | 14 | 15 | 16 | 17 | 18 | 19 | 20 | 21 | 22 | 23 | 24 | 25 | 26 | 27 | 28 | 29 | 30 |
|---|---|---|---|---|---|---|---|---|---|---|---|---|---|---|---|---|---|---|---|---|---|---|---|---|---|---|---|---|---|---|
| Ground | H | H | A | A | H | A | H | H | A | H | A | H | A | H | A | H | H | A | H | A | H | A | H | A | A | H | A | A | H | A |
| Result | W | D | W | W | D | W | L | W | L | W | W | D | W | L | W | W | W | L | W | W | W | W | D | D | D | W | W | D | W | D |
| Position | 4 | 5 | 4 | 7 | 2 | 3 | 3 | 3 | 3 | 2 | 2 | 2 | 2 | 3 | 2 | 3 | 2 | 3 | 3 | 3 | 3 | 3 | 3 | 3 | 3 | 3 | 2 | 2 | 2 | 2 |

Updated to match(es) played on 28 November 2010. Source: See results
A = Away; H = Home; W = Win; D = Draw; L = Loss

==== Results ====
| 12 March 2010 1 | CSKA Moscow | 1 – 0 | Amkar Perm | Moscow |
| 19:00 MSK (UTC+3) | Dzagoev (yellow card) 38'; Necid (yellow card) 67'; V.Berezutski (yellow card) 86'; Mamayev (yellow card) 86'; Honda 90' | Report | Novaković (yellow card) 14'; Belorukov (yellow card) 40'; Peev (yellow card) 86' | Stadium: Arena Khimki; Attendance: 6,700; Referee: Vladimir Pettay |

| 21 March 2010 2 | CSKA Moscow | 0 – 0 | Dynamo Moscow | Moscow |
| 16:30 MSK (UTC+3) | Šemberas (yellow card) 55'; Mamayev (yellow card) 82' | Report | Semshov (yellow card) 30'; Kombarov (yellow card) 48'; Epureanu (yellow card) 71' | Stadium: Arena Khimki; Attendance: 13,000; Referee: Aleksandr Kolobaev |

| 26 March 2010 3 | Anzhi Makhachkala | 1 – 2 | CSKA Moscow | Makhachkala |
| 19:15 MSK (UTC+3) | Khojava (yellow card) 7'; Streltsov 11'; Agalarov (yellow card) 26' | Report | Nababkin (yellow card) 46'; Honda 49'; Rahimić (yellow card) 59'; Necid 62' (yellow card) 87'; Šemberas (yellow card) 79'; V.Berezutski (yellow card) 88' | Stadium: Dynamo Stadium; Attendance: 15,200; Referee: Igor Egorov |

| 11 April 2010 5 | Alania Vladikavkaz | 1 – 3 | CSKA Moscow | Vladikavkaz |
| 16:15 MSK (UTC+4) | Kuznetsov 57'; Gnanou (yellow card) 46' (yellow-red card) 69'; Goore (yellow card) 72' | Report | Guilherme 6'; Krasić 45'; Dzagoev 70' (pen.); Odiah (yellow card) 88' | Stadium: Republican Spartak Stadium; Attendance: 25,000; Referee: Vyacheslav Popov |

| 17 April 2010 6 | CSKA Moscow | 1 – 1 | Lokomotiv Moscow | Moscow |
| 14:00 MSK (UTC+4) | Guilherme 7'; Šemberas (yellow card) 13'; Schennikov (yellow card) 70'; Necid (yellow card) 85' | Report | Glushakov (yellow card) 12'; Odemwingie (yellow card) 74'; Maicon (yellow card) 81'; Kuzmin 89' | Stadium: Arena Khimki; Attendance: 14,000; Referee: Yuri Baskakov |

| 24 April 2010 7 | Sibir Novosibirsk | 1 – 4 | CSKA Moscow | Novosibirsk |
| 14:00 MSK (UTC+4) | Bliznyuk (yellow card) 8'; Astafyev (yellow card) 14'; Čížek 74' | Report | Ignashevich 11' (yellow card) 40'; Guilherme 45'; Necid 54'; Dzagoev 73' (yellow card) 75' | Stadium: Spartak Stadium; Attendance: 12,400; Referee: Vladislav Bezborodov |

| 28 April 2010 4 | CSKA Moscow | 0 – 2 | Zenit St. Petersburg | Moscow |
| 20:00 MSK (UTC+4) | Akinfeev (yellow card) 61' | Report | Križanac 5'; Kerzhakov 65' | Stadium: Arena Khimki; Attendance: 15,000; Referee: Aleksandr Gvardis |

| 2 May 2010 8 | CSKA Moscow | 3 – 1 | Tom Tomsk | Moscow |
| 14:00 MSK (UTC+4) | Krasić 20' (yellow card) 21'; Guilherme 72', 90'; Odiah (yellow card) 75' | Report | Kharitonov 15'; Jokić (yellow card) 44' | Stadium: Arena Khimki; Attendance: 6,500; Referee: Stanislav Sukhina |

| 6 May 2010 9 | Rostov | 1 – 0 | CSKA Moscow | Rostov-on-Don |
| 16:30 MSK (UTC+4) | Ivanov (yellow card) 14'; Ahmetović 68'; Gațcan (yellow card) 84' | Report | Šemberas (yellow card) 17' (yellow-red card) 83' | Stadium: Olimp – 2 Attendance: 14,300; Referee: Vyacheslav Popov |

| 10 May 2010 10 | CSKA Moscow | 4 – 0 | Terek Grozny | Moscow |
| 14:00 MSK (UTC+4) | Odiah 47' (red card) 69'; González 53'; Dzagoev 57', 62'; Necid (yellow card) 71'; Oliseh (yellow card) 90' | Report | Georgiev 26' (yellow card) 63'; Kobenko (yellow card) 33'; Utsiyev (yellow card) 71' | Stadium: Arena Khimki; Attendance: 6,500; Referee: Igor Egorov |

| 14 May 2010 11 | Rubin Kazan | 0 – 1 | CSKA Moscow | Kazan |
| 18:15 MSK (UTC+4) | | Report | González 38'; Dzagoev (yellow card) 83' | Stadium: Central Stadium; Attendance: 17,100; Referee: Vladislav Bezborodov |

| 10 July 2010 12 | CSKA Moscow | 1 – 1 | Saturn Moscow | Moscow |
| 16:00 MSK (UTC+4) | V.Berezutski (yellow card) 20'; Dzagoev 27'; Šemberas (yellow card) 45' | Report | Kirichenko 7'; Zelão (yellow card) 45'; Karyaka (yellow card) 45'; Jakubko (yellow card) 71' | Stadium: Arena Khimki; Attendance: 5,365; Referee: Aleksei Nikolaev |

| 19 July 2010 13 | Krylia Sovetov Samara | 0 – 1 | CSKA Moscow | Samara |
| 20:00 MSK (UTC+4) | | Report | Dzagoev 9' (pen.); Mamayev (yellow card) 16'; Rahimić (yellow card) 89'; A.Berezutski (yellow card) 90' | Stadium: Metallurg Stadium; Attendance: 16,050; Referee: Vladimir Kazmenko |

| 25 July 2010 14 | CSKA Moscow | 1 – 2 | Spartak Nalchik | Moscow |
| 21:00 MSK (UTC+4) | Šemberas (yellow card) 42'; Dzagoev (yellow card) 42'; Necid 45' | Report | Siradze 8' (yellow card) 50'; Gogua (yellow card) 42' (goal) 44' | Stadium: Arena Khimki; Attendance: 5,100; Referee: Stanislav Sukhina |

| 1 August 2010 15 | Spartak Moscow | 1 – 2 | CSKA Moscow | Moscow |
| 19:00 MSK (UTC+4) | Suchý (yellow card) 13'; Zotov (yellow card) 44'; V.Berezutski 71' (o.g.) | Report | Mamayev (yellow card) 43'; Shchennikov (yellow card) 75'; Ignashevich 82'; Vágner Love 90' | Stadium: Luzhniki Stadium; Attendance: 55,000; Referee: Aleksandr Kolobaev |

| 15 August 2010 17 | CSKA Moscow | 4 – 0 | Anzhi Makhachkala | Moscow |
| 20:30 MSK (UTC+4) | Oliseh 12', 44'; Vágner Love 20'; Tošić 36' (yellow card) 88' | Report | | Stadium: Arena Khimki; Attendance: 4,500; Referee: Vladimir Kazmenko |

| 29 August 2010 19 | CSKA Moscow | 2 – 1 | Alania Vladikavkaz | Moscow |
| 18:30 MSK (UTC+4) | Doumbia 4'; Tošić 69' | Report | Ivanov (yellow card) 26'; Mashukov (yellow card) 44'; Florescu 90' (pen.) | Stadium: Arena Khimki; Attendance: 8,000; Referee: Vitali Meshkov |

| 12 September 2010 20 | Lokomotiv Moscow | 1 – 0 | CSKA Moscow | Moscow |
| 15:00 MSK (UTC+4) | Maicon 25' (yellow card) 26'; Guilherme (yellow card) 57'; Asatiani (red card) 70' | Report | Mamayev (yellow card) 45'; González (red card) 70' | Stadium: Lokomotiv Stadium; Attendance: 20,608; Referee: Vladislav Bezborodov |

| 20 September 2010 21 | CSKA Moscow | 1 – 0 | Sibir Novosibirsk | Moscow |
| 20:00 MSK (UTC+4) | Oliseh 74' | Report | Molosh (yellow card) 88' | Stadium: Arena Khimki; Attendance: 4,500; Referee: Mikhail Vilkov |

| 26 September 2010 22 | Tom Tomsk | 0 – 3 | CSKA Moscow | Tomsk |
| 13:30 MSK (UTC+4) | | Report | Vágner Love 1'; Nababkin (yellow card) 19'; Doumbia 40' (yellow card) 87'; Necid 90' | Stadium: Trud Stadium; Attendance: 14,000; Referee: Stanislav Sukhina |

| 3 October 2010 23 | CSKA Moscow | 2 – 0 | Rostov | Moscow |
| 15:00 MSK (UTC+4) | Vágner Love 36', 44' (pen.) (yellow card) 45' | Report | Gațcan (yellow card) 15'; Kalachou (yellow card) 42'; Khagush (yellow card) 43' | Stadium: Arena Khimki; Attendance: 4,740; Referee: Vyacheslav Popov |

| 17 October 2010 24 | Terek Grozny | 0 – 3 | CSKA Moscow | Grozny |
| 14:00 MSK (UTC+4) | Ferreira (yellow card) 37'; Essame (yellow card) 62'; Utsiyev (yellow card) 83' | Report | Doumbia 18'; Vágner Love 76'; Honda 90' | Stadium: Sultan Bilimkhanov Stadium; Attendance: 9,300; Referee: Vladislav Bezborodov |

| 24 October 2010 25 | CSKA Moscow | 0 – 0 | Rubin Kazan | Moscow |
| 14:10 MSK (UTC+4) | Nababkin (yellow card) 45' | Report | Navas (yellow card) 62'; Kuzmin (yellow card) 69' | Stadium: Arena Khimki; Attendance: 11,000; Referee: Stanislav Sukhina |

| 27 October 2010 16 | Dynamo Moscow | 0 – 0 | CSKA Moscow | Moscow |
| 18:15 MSK (UTC+4) | Fernández (yellow card) 19'; Ropotan (yellow card) 54'; Epureanu (yellow card) 86' | Report | Doumbia (yellow card) 44'; Šemberas (yellow card) 50'; Vágner Love (yellow card) 54'; Ignashevich (yellow card) 80' | Stadium: Arena Khimki; Attendance: 9,153; Referee: Aleksei Nikolaev |

| 31 October 2010 26 | Saturn Moscow | 1 – 1 | CSKA Moscow | Moscow |
| 18:30 MSK (UTC+3) | Ivanov 46'; Zelão (yellow card) 31'; Parfenov (yellow card) 50'; Nakhushev (red card) 53' | Report | Necid 39'; Nababkin (yellow card) 42' | Stadium: Saturn Stadium; Attendance: 12,000; Referee: Maksim Layushkin |

| 7 November 2010 27 | CSKA Moscow | 4 – 3 | Krylia Sovetov Samara | Moscow |
| 19:00 MSK (UTC+3) | A.Berezutski 3' (red card) 80'; Necid 8', 89'; Tošić 67' | Report | Ivanov 72'; Leilton 81' (pen.); Tkachev 90+2' | Stadium: Arena Khimki; Attendance: 4,500; Referee: Vladimir Kazmenko |

| 10 November 2010 18 | Zenit St. Petersburg | 1 – 3 | CSKA Moscow | Saint Petersburg |
| 19:00 MSK (UTC+3) | Alves (yellow card) 82'; Anyukov (yellow card) 86'; Rosina 90' | Report | Vágner Love 14'; González 34'; Doumbia 52'; Akinfeev (yellow card) 79'; Mamaev (yellow card) 90' | Stadium: Petrovsky Stadium; Attendance: 20,500; Referee: Stanislav Sukhina |

| 14 November 2010 28 | Spartak Nalchik | 1 – 1 | CSKA Moscow | Nalchik |
| 14:00 MSK (UTC+3) | Džudović (yellow card) 32'; Dyadyun (yellow card) 32'; Gogua (yellow card) 44'; Koliņko (yellow card) 58'; Goshokov 87' | Report | Vágner Love 59' (pen.); Nababkin (yellow card) 65'; Necid (yellow card) 83' | Stadium: Spartak Stadium; Attendance: 14,200; Referee: Eduard Malyi |

| 20 November 2010 29 | CSKA Moscow | 3 – 1 | Spartak Moscow | Moscow |
| 14:00 MSK (UTC+3) | Doumbia (yellow card) 28' (goal) 66'; Šemberas (yellow card) 37' (yellow-red card) 51'; Honda 57'; Vágner Love 90' (yellow card) 90'; Ignashevich (yellow card) 90' | Report | Ivanov (yellow card) 9'; Sheshukov (yellow card) 15'; Ibson 17' (yellow card) 77' | Stadium: Arena Khimki; Attendance: 14,800; Referee: Aleksei Nikolaev |

| 28 November 2010 30 | Amkar Perm | 0 – 0 | CSKA Moscow | Perm |
| 14:00 MSK (UTC+3) | | Report | Necid (yellow card) 53'; Dzagoev (yellow card) 54' | Stadium: Zvezda Stadium; Attendance: 11,600; Referee: Vladislav Bezborodov |

==== League table ====
| Pos | Team | Pld | W | D | L | GF | GA | GD | Pts | Qualification or relegation |
|---|---|---|---|---|---|---|---|---|---|---|
| 1 | Zenit St. Petersburg (C) | 30 | 20 | 8 | 2 | 61 | 21 | +40 | 68 | Qualification to Champions League group stage |
| 2 | CSKA Moscow | 30 | 18 | 8 | 4 | 51 | 22 | +29 | 62 | Qualification to Champions League group stage |
| 3 | Rubin Kazan | 30 | 15 | 13 | 2 | 37 | 16 | +21 | 58 | Qualification to Champions League third qualifying round |
| 4 | Spartak Moscow | 30 | 13 | 10 | 7 | 43 | 33 | +10 | 49 | Qualification to Europa League play-off round |
| 5 | Lokomotiv Moscow | 30 | 13 | 9 | 8 | 34 | 29 | +5 | 48 | Qualification to Europa League play-off round |

Source: RFPL (in Russian)
Rules for classification: 1st points; 2nd matches won; 3rd head-to-head (points, matches won, goal difference, goals scored, away goals scored); 4th goal difference; 5th goals scored; 6th away goals scored; 7th position in previous season or decision game
(C) Champions

=== Russian Cup ===
| 14 July 2010 Round of 32 | Torpedo Moscow | 0 – 2 | CSKA Moscow | Moscow |
| 18:30 MSK (UTC+4) | Rekudanov (yellow card) 8' | Report | Guilherme 9', 12' | Stadium: Eduard Streltsov Stadium; Attendance: 9,000; Referee: Yevgeni Turbin |

Round 16 took place during the 2011–12 season.

=== Europa League ===
==== Play-off round ====
| 19 August 2010 1st leg | CSKA Moscow (Russia) | 4 – 0 | (Cyprus) Anorthosis | Khimki, Russia |
| 20:30 MSK (UTC+4) | Doumbia 13', 20'; Tošić 48', 74'; Vágner Love (penalty missed) 79' | Report | Argüello (red card) 77'; Okkas (yellow card) 78'; Laborde (yellow card) 82'; Laban (yellow card) 83' | Stadium: Arena Khimki; Attendance: 6,000; Referee: Sascha Kever (Switzerland) |

| 24 August 2010 2nd leg | Anorthosis (Cyprus) | 1–2 (1–6 agg.) | (Russia) CSKA Moscow | Larnaca, Cyprus |
| 20:00 MSK (UTC+4) | Marangos (yellow card) 35'; Frontini (yellow card) 39'; Georgiou (yellow card) 45'; García (yellow card) 70'; Cafú 76'; Brachi (yellow card) 84' | Report | Mamayev (yellow card) 21'; Honda (yellow card) 82'; Doumbia 85'; González 89' | Stadium: Antonis Papadopoulos Stadium; Attendance: 4,000; Referee: Alexandru Deaconu (Romania) |

==== Group stage ====
| Pos | Team | Pld | W | D | L | GF | GA | GD | Pts | Qualification |
|---|---|---|---|---|---|---|---|---|---|---|
| 1 | (Russia) CSKA Moscow | 6 | 5 | 1 | 0 | 18 | 3 | +15 | 16 | Advance to knockout phase |
| 2 | (Czech Republic) Sparta Prague | 6 | 2 | 3 | 1 | 12 | 12 | 0 | 9 | Advance to knockout phase |
| 3 | (Italy) Palermo | 6 | 2 | 1 | 3 | 7 | 11 | −4 | 7 | |
| 4 | (Switzerland) Lausanne-Sport | 6 | 0 | 1 | 5 | 5 | 16 | −11 | 1 | |

Source: Soccerway

| 16 September 2010 1 | Lausanne-Sport (Switzerland) | 0 – 3 | (Russia) CSKA Moscow | Lausanne, Switzerland |
| 21:00 MSK (UTC+4) | Marazzi (yellow card) 45'; Katz (yellow card) 65'; Avanzini (yellow card) 80' | Report | Vágner Love 22', 80' (pen.); Šemberas (yellow card) 32'; Dzagoev (yellow card) 41'; Ignashevich 68'; V.Berezutski (yellow card) 90' | Stadium: Stade Olympique de la Pontaise; Attendance: 9,531; Referee: Simon Lee Evans (Wales) |

| 30 September 2010 2 | CSKA Moscow (Russia) | 3 – 0 | (Czech Republic) Sparta Prague | Khimki, Russia |
| 21:00 MSK (UTC+4) | Doumbia 72', 86'; González 84' (pen.); Ignashevich (yellow card) 89' | Report | Vacek (yellow card) 74'; Řepka (yellow card) 83' | Stadium: Arena Khimki; Attendance: 12,900; Referee: Tommy Skjerven (Norway) |

| 21 October 2010 3 | Palermo (Italy) | 0 – 3 | (Russia) CSKA Moscow | Palermo, Italy |
| 23:05 MSK (UTC+4) | Benussi (yellow card) 22'; Balzaretti (yellow card) 69'; Pastore (yellow card) 74' (yellow-red card) 75'; Pinilla (yellow card) 90' | Report | Vágner Love (penalty missed) 23'; Doumbia 34', 59'; Necid 82' | Stadium: Stadio Renzo Barbera; Attendance: 17,548; Referee: Robert Schörgenhofer (Austria) |

| 4 November 2010 4 | CSKA Moscow (Russia) | 3 – 1 | (Italy) Palermo | Khimki, Russia |
| 21:00 MSK (UTC+3) | Honda 47'; Necid 50', 54' | Report | Maccarone 10'; Nocerino (yellow card) 17' (yellow-red card) 31' | Stadium: Arena Khimki; Attendance: 11,980; Referee: Manuel De Sousa (Portugal) |

| 2 December 2010 5 | CSKA Moscow (Russia) | 5 – 1 | (Switzerland) Lausanne-Sport | Khimki, Russia |
| 21:00 MSK (UTC+3) | Necid 18', 82'; Oliseh 22'; Tošić 40'; Dzagoev 71'; Ignashevich (yellow card) 90' | Report | Marazzi (yellow card) 75'; Carrupt (yellow card) 84' (goal) 90+2' | Stadium: Arena Khimki; Attendance: 4,500; Referee: Michael Weiner (Germany) |

| 15 December 2010 6 | Sparta Prague (Czech Republic) | 1 – 1 | (Russia) CSKA Moscow | Prague, Czech Republic |
| 21:00 MSK (UTC+4) | Kadlec 44' | Report | Dzagoev 15' (yellow card) 33' | Stadium: Generali Arena; Attendance: 12,707; Referee: Martin Ingvarsson (Sweden) |

== Squad statistics ==
As of match played 15 December 2010

=== Appearances and goals ===
| No. | Pos | Nat | Player | Total | | Premier League | | Russian Cup | | Champions League | | Europa League | | Super Cup | |
| No. | Pos | Nat | Player | Apps | Goals | Apps | Goals | Apps | Goals | Apps | Goals | Apps | Goals | Apps | Goals |
|---|---|---|---|---|---|---|---|---|---|---|---|---|---|---|---|
| 1 | GK | (Russia) RUS | Sergey Chepchugov | 3 | 0 | 2 | 0 | 0 | 0 | 0 | 0 | 1 | 0 | 0 | 0 |
| 2 | MF | (Lithuania) LTU | Deividas Šemberas | 39 | 0 | 21+5 | 0 | 1 | 0 | 4 | 0 | 7 | 0 | 1 | 0 |
| 4 | DF | (Russia) RUS | Sergei Ignashevich | 40 | 3 | 28 | 2 | 1 | 0 | 4 | 0 | 6 | 1 | 1 | 0 |
| 6 | DF | (Russia) RUS | Aleksei Berezutski | 32 | 1 | 23 | 1 | 0 | 0 | 4 | 0 | 4 | 0 | 1 | 0 |
| 7 | MF | (Japan) JPN | Keisuke Honda | 40 | 6 | 23+5 | 4 | 0+1 | 0 | 4 | 1 | 4+2 | 1 | 1 | 0 |
| 8 | FW | (Ivory Coast) CIV | Seydou Doumbia | 15 | 12 | 11 | 5 | 0 | 0 | 0 | 0 | 4 | 7 | 0 | 0 |
| 9 | FW | (Brazil) BRA | Vágner Love | 20 | 11 | 15+0 | 9 | 0+0 | 0 | 0+0 | 0 | 5+0 | 2 | 0 | 0 |
| 10 | MF | (Russia) RUS | Alan Dzagoev | 36 | 8 | 19+5 | 6 | 1 | 0 | 1+1 | 0 | 4+4 | 2 | 0+1 | 0 |
| 11 | MF | (Russia) RUS | Pavel Mamayev | 39 | 0 | 18+9 | 0 | 0+1 | 0 | 2+2 | 0 | 6 | 0 | 1 | 0 |
| 13 | MF | (Chile) CHI | Mark González | 34 | 6 | 12+9 | 3 | 1 | 0 | 3+1 | 1 | 4+3 | 2 | 1 | 0 |
| 14 | DF | (Russia) RUS | Kirill Nababkin | 17 | 0 | 12+1 | 0 | 0 | 0 | 0 | 0 | 4 | 0 | 0 | 0 |
| 15 | DF | (Nigeria) NGA | Chidi Odiah | 14 | 1 | 9+2 | 1 | 1 | 0 | 0+2 | 0 | 0 | 0 | 0 | 0 |
| 21 | MF | (Serbia) SRB | Zoran Tošić | 23 | 6 | 11+4 | 3 | 0 | 0 | 0 | 0 | 6+2 | 3 | 0 | 0 |
| 22 | MF | (Russia) RUS | Evgeni Aldonin | 21 | 0 | 6+8 | 0 | 1 | 0 | 3 | 0 | 1+2 | 0 | 0 | 0 |
| 24 | DF | (Russia) RUS | Vasili Berezutski | 35 | 0 | 22 | 0 | 1 | 0 | 4 | 0 | 7 | 0 | 1 | 0 |
| 25 | MF | (Bosnia and Herzegovina) BIH | Elvir Rahimić | 18 | 0 | 3+8 | 0 | 1 | 0 | 0+3 | 0 | 2+1 | 0 | 0 | 0 |
| 26 | MF | (Liberia) LBR | Sekou Oliseh | 24 | 4 | 13+3 | 3 | 1 | 0 | 0 | 0 | 5+2 | 1 | 0 | 0 |
| 35 | GK | (Russia) RUS | Igor Akinfeev | 41 | 0 | 28 | 0 | 1 | 0 | 4 | 0 | 7 | 0 | 1 | 0 |
| 42 | DF | (Russia) RUS | Georgi Shchennikov | 38 | 0 | 24+1 | 0 | 1 | 0 | 4 | 0 | 7 | 0 | 1 | 0 |
| 49 | MF | (Russia) RUS | Aleksandr Vasilyev | 1 | 0 | 0 | 0 | 0 | 0 | 0 | 0 | 0+1 | 0 | 0 | 0 |
| 59 | DF | (Russia) RUS | Semyon Fedotov | 1 | 0 | 0 | 0 | 0 | 0 | 0 | 0 | 1 | 0 | 0 | 0 |
| 89 | FW | (Czech Republic) CZE | Tomáš Necid | 37 | 13 | 12+12 | 7 | 0+1 | 0 | 4 | 1 | 3+4 | 5 | 1 | 0 |
Players away from the club on loan:
Players who appeared for CSKA Moscow no longer at the club:
| 17 | MF | (Serbia) SRB | Miloš Krasić | 18 | 2 | 9+5 | 2 | 0 | 0 | 3 | 0 | 0 | 0 | 1 | 0 |
| 20 | FW | (Brazil) BRA | Guilherme | 14 | 7 | 9+3 | 5 | 1 | 2 | 0+1 | 0 | 0 | 0 | 0 | 0 |

=== Goal scorers ===
| Place | Position | Nation | Number | Name | Premier League | Russian Cup | UEFA Champions League | UEFA Europa League | Super Cup | Total |
|---|---|---|---|---|---|---|---|---|---|---|
| 1 | FW | (Czech Republic) | 89 | Tomáš Necid | 7 | 0 | 1 | 5 | 0 | 13 |
| 2 | FW | (Ivory Coast) | 8 | Seydou Doumbia | 5 | 0 | 0 | 7 | 0 | 12 |
| 3 | FW | (Brazil) | 9 | Vágner Love | 9 | 0 | 0 | 2 | 0 | 11 |
| 4 | MF | (Russia) | 10 | Alan Dzagoev | 6 | 0 | 0 | 2 | 0 | 8 |
| 5 | FW | (Brazil) | 20 | Guilherme | 5 | 2 | 0 | 0 | 0 | 7 |
| 6 | MF | (Japan) | 7 | Keisuke Honda | 4 | 0 | 1 | 1 | 0 | 6 |
| 6 | MF | (Chile) | 13 | Mark González | 3 | 0 | 1 | 2 | 0 | 6 |
| 6 | MF | (Serbia) | 21 | Zoran Tošić | 3 | 0 | 0 | 3 | 0 | 6 |
| 9 | MF | (Liberia) | 26 | Sekou Oliseh | 3 | 0 | 0 | 1 | 0 | 4 |
| 10 | DF | (Russia) | 4 | Sergei Ignashevich | 2 | 0 | 0 | 1 | 0 | 3 |
| 11 | MF | (Serbia) | 17 | Miloš Krasić | 2 | 0 | 0 | 0 | 0 | 2 |
| 12 | DF | (Nigeria) | 15 | Chidi Odiah | 1 | 0 | 0 | 0 | 0 | 1 |
| 12 | DF | (Russia) | 6 | Aleksei Berezutski | 1 | 0 | 0 | 0 | 0 | 1 |
| | | | | Totals | 51 | 2 | 3 | 24 | 0 | 80 |

=== Disciplinary record ===
| Number | Nation | Position | Name | Russian Premier League | | Russian Cup | | Champions League | | Europa League | | Super Cup | | Total | |
| Number | Nation | Position | Name | Booked | Sent off (straight red) | Booked | Sent off (straight red) | Booked | Sent off (straight red) | Booked | Sent off (straight red) | Booked | Sent off (straight red) | Booked | Sent off (straight red) |
| 2 | (Lithuania) | DF | Deividas Šemberas | 8 | 2 | 0 | 0 | 1 | 0 | 1 | 0 | 1 | 0 | 11 | 2 |
| 4 | (Russia) | DF | Sergei Ignashevich | 3 | 0 | 0 | 0 | 0 | 0 | 2 | 0 | 0 | 0 | 5 | 0 |
| 6 | (Russia) | DF | Aleksei Berezutski | 1 | 1 | 0 | 0 | 1 | 0 | 0 | 0 | 0 | 0 | 2 | 1 |
| 7 | (Japan) | MF | Keisuke Honda | 0 | 0 | 0 | 0 | 1 | 0 | 1 | 0 | 1 | 0 | 3 | 0 |
| 8 | (Ivory Coast) | FW | Seydou Doumbia | 2 | 0 | 0 | 0 | 0 | 0 | 0 | 0 | 0 | 0 | 2 | 0 |
| 9 | (Brazil) | FW | Vágner Love | 4 | 0 | 0 | 0 | 0 | 0 | 0 | 0 | 0 | 0 | 4 | 0 |
| 10 | (Russia) | MF | Alan Dzagoev | 5 | 0 | 0 | 0 | 0 | 0 | 2 | 0 | 0 | 0 | 7 | 0 |
| 11 | (Russia) | MF | Pavel Mamayev | 6 | 0 | 0 | 0 | 1 | 0 | 1 | 0 | 1 | 0 | 9 | 0 |
| 13 | (Chile) | MF | Mark González | 0 | 1 | 0 | 0 | 2 | 0 | 0 | 0 | 0 | 0 | 2 | 1 |
| 14 | (Russia) | DF | Kirill Nababkin | 5 | 0 | 0 | 0 | 0 | 0 | 0 | 0 | 0 | 0 | 5 | 0 |
| 15 | (Nigeria) | DF | Chidi Odiah | 2 | 1 | 0 | 0 | 2 | 1 | 0 | 0 | 0 | 0 | 4 | 1 |
| 21 | (Serbia) | MF | Zoran Tošić | 1 | 0 | 0 | 0 | 0 | 0 | 0 | 0 | 0 | 0 | 1 | 0 |
| 22 | (Russia) | MF | Evgeni Aldonin | 0 | 0 | 0 | 0 | 2 | 0 | 0 | 0 | 0 | 0 | 2 | 0 |
| 24 | (Russia) | DF | Vasili Berezutski | 3 | 0 | 0 | 0 | 0 | 0 | 1 | 0 | 0 | 0 | 4 | 0 |
| 25 | (Bosnia and Herzegovina) | MF | Elvir Rahimić | 2 | 0 | 0 | 0 | 0 | 0 | 0 | 0 | 0 | 0 | 2 | 0 |
| 26 | (Liberia) | MF | Sekou Oliseh | 1 | 0 | 0 | 0 | 0 | 0 | 0 | 0 | 0 | 0 | 1 | 0 |
| 35 | (Russia) | GK | Igor Akinfeev | 3 | 0 | 0 | 0 | 0 | 0 | 0 | 0 | 0 | 0 | 3 | 0 |
| 42 | (Russia) | DF | Georgi Shchennikov | 2 | 0 | 0 | 0 | 1 | 0 | 0 | 0 | 0 | 0 | 3 | 0 |
| 89 | (Czech Republic) | FW | Tomáš Necid | 6 | 0 | 0 | 0 | 0 | 0 | 0 | 0 | 0 | 0 | 6 | 0 |
Players away on loan:
Players who left CSKA Moscow during the season:
| 17 | (Serbia) | MF | Miloš Krasić | 1 | 0 | 0 | 0 | 1 | 0 | 0 | 0 | 0 | 0 | 2 | 0 |
| | | | Totals | 55 | 5 | 0 | 0 | 12 | 1 | 8 | 0 | 3 | 0 | 78 | 6 |
