= 2011–12 PFC CSKA Moscow season =

CSKA
2011–12 season
- Chairman: Yevgeni Giner
- Manager: Leonid Slutsky
- Stadium: Luzhniki Stadium
- Russian Premier League: 3rd
- Europa League: Round of 16 vs Porto
- Super Cup: Runners-up
- 2010–11 Russian Cup: Champions
- 2011–12 Russian Cup: Round of 32 vs Volgar-Gazprom Astrakhan
- Champions League: Round of 16 vs Real Madrid
- Top goalscorer: League: Seydou Doumbia (28); All: Seydou Doumbia (37)
- Highest home attendance: 51,000 vs Spartak Moscow (28 April 2011)
- Lowest home attendance: 6,000 vs Rostov (14 May 2011)
- Average home league attendance: 16,528 (8 May 2012)
Home colours	Away colours	Third colours

The 2011–12 CSKA season was the 20th successive season that the club will play in the Russian Premier League, the highest tier of association football in Russia.

== Squad ==
As of match played 13 May 2012

Number	Name	Nationality	Position	Date of birth (age)	Signed from	Signed in	Contract ends	Apps.	Goals
Goalkeepers
1	Sergei Chepchugov	(Russia)	GK	15 July 1985 (aged 26)	Sibir Novosibirsk	2010		16	0
35	Igor Akinfeev (captain)	(Russia)	GK	8 April 1986 (aged 26)	Academy	2003		330	0
37	Ivan Skripnik	(Russia)	GK	10 August 1992 (aged 19)	Academy	2009		0	0
38	Vyacheslav Isupov	(Russia)	GK	16 January 1993 (aged 19)	Academy	2010		0	0
41	Vadim Karpov	(Russia)	GK	10 May 1994 (aged 18)	Academy	2012		0	0
45	Ilya Pomazun	(Russia)	GK	16 August 1996 (aged 15)	Academy	2012		0	0
84	Ilya Samorukov	(Russia)	GK	2 August 1996 (aged 15)	Academy	2012		0	0
95	Sergei Revyakin	(Russia)	GK	2 April 1995 (aged 17)	Academy	2008		2	0
Defenders
2	Deividas Šemberas	(Lithuania)	DF	2 August 1978 (aged 33)	Dynamo Moscow	2002		366	2
4	Sergei Ignashevich	(Russia)	DF	14 July 1979 (aged 32)	Lokomotiv Moscow	2004		327	32
5	Viktor Vasin	(Russia)	DF	6 October 1988 (aged 23)	Spartak Nalchik	2011		4	0
6	Aleksei Berezutski	(Russia)	DF	20 June 1982 (aged 29)	Chernomorets Novorossiysk	2001		371	8
14	Kirill Nababkin	(Russia)	DF	8 September 1986 (aged 25)	Moscow	2010		65	0
24	Vasili Berezutski	(Russia)	DF	20 June 1982 (aged 29)	Torpedo-ZIL	2002		334	10
39	Vyacheslav Karavayev	(Russia)	DF	20 May 1995 (aged 16)	Academy	2011		0	0
42	Georgi Shchennikov	(Russia)	DF	27 April 1991 (aged 21)	Academy	2008		113	0
53	Andrei Semyonov	(Russia)	DF	8 June 1992 (aged 19)	Lokomotiv Moscow	2011		0	0
59	Semyon Fedotov	(Russia)	DF	2 March 1992 (aged 20)	Academy	2009		4	0
60	Layonel Adams	(Russia)	DF	9 August 1994 (aged 17)	Academy	2012		0	0
77	Pavel Drozdov	(Russia)	DF	21 June 1993 (aged 18)	Academy	2011		0	0
90	Anton Polyutkin	(Russia)	DF	2 February 1993 (aged 19)	Academy	2010		0	0
92	Pyotr Ten	(Russia)	DF	12 July 1992 (aged 19)	Academy	2010		0	0
Midfielders
3	Pontus Wernbloom	(Sweden)	MF	25 June 1986 (aged 25)	AZ Alkmaar	2012	2016	13	1
7	Keisuke Honda	(Japan)	MF	13 June 1986 (aged 25)	VVV-Venlo	2010	2013	74	14
10	Alan Dzagoev	(Russia)	MF	17 June 1990 (aged 21)	Krylia Sovetov-SOK Dimitrovgrad	2008		152	37
13	Mark González	(Chile)	MF	10 July 1984 (aged 27)	Real Betis	2009	2014	47	9
17	Pavel Mamayev	(Russia)	MF	17 September 1988 (aged 23)	Torpedo Moscow	2007		157	5
19	Aleksandrs Cauņa	(Latvia)	MF	19 January 1988 (aged 24)	Skonto Riga	2011	2016	26	1
21	Zoran Tošić	(Serbia)	MF	28 April 1987 (aged 25)	Manchester United	2010	2015	73	16
22	Evgeni Aldonin	(Russia)	MF	22 January 1980 (aged 32)	Rotor Volgograd	2004		315	13
25	Elvir Rahimić	(Bosnia and Herzegovina)	MF	4 April 1976 (aged 36)	Anzhi Makhachkala	2001		345	7
26	Sekou Oliseh	(Liberia)	MF	5 June 1990 (aged 21)	Midtjylland	2010	2015	78	5
29	Kim In-sung	(South Korea)	MF	9 September 1989 (aged 22)	Gangneung City	2012	2013	1	0
36	Yegor Ivanov	(Russia)	MF	19 June 1992 (aged 19)	Academy	2010		0	0
40	Yuri Bavin	(Russia)	MF	5 February 1994 (aged 18)	Academy	2012		0	0
46	Nikolai Dergachyov	(Russia)	MF	24 May 1994 (aged 17)	Saturn-2	2012		0	0
48	Artyom Popov	(Russia)	MF	30 August 1992 (aged 19)	Academy	2010		1	0
51	Maksim Martusevich	(Russia)	MF	7 March 1995 (aged 17)	Academy	2012		0	0
52	Ravil Netfullin	(Russia)	MF	3 March 1993 (aged 19)	Academy	2012		0	0
55	Batraz Khadartsev	(Russia)	MF	23 May 1993 (aged 18)	Academy	2011		0	0
56	Suleyman Abdullin	(Russia)	MF	30 March 1993 (aged 19)	Academy	2011		0	0
57	Alexandr Vasyukov	(Russia)	MF	18 February 1992 (aged 20)	Academy	2011		0	0
70	Armen Ambartsumyan	(Russia)	MF	11 April 1994 (aged 18)	Academy	2010		0	0
80	David Khurtsidze	(Russia)	MF	4 July 1993 (aged 18)	Academy	2011		0	0
88	Leonid Rodionov	(Russia)	MF	12 January 1993 (aged 19)	Academy	2010		0	0
93	Gela Zaseyev	(Russia)	MF	20 January 1993 (aged 19)	Academy	2010		0	0
99	Yevgeni Kobzar	(Russia)	MF	9 August 1992 (aged 19)	Academy	2009		0	0
Forwards
8	Seydou Doumbia	(Ivory Coast)	FW	31 December 1987 (aged 24)	Young Boys	2010	2015	73	49
18	Ahmed Musa	(Nigeria)	FW	13 August 1989 (aged 22)	VVV-Venlo	2012	2017	13	1
50	Sergei Seredin	(Russia)	FW	10 April 1994 (aged 18)	Academy	2011		0	0
61	Serder Serderov	(Russia)	FW	10 March 1994 (aged 18)	Academy	2010		1	0
79	Konstantin Bazelyuk	(Russia)	FW	12 April 1993 (aged 19)	Academy	2010		0	0
89	Tomáš Necid	(Czech Republic)	FW	13 August 1989 (aged 22)	Slavia Prague	2009		105	31
94	Georgiy Baghdasaryan	(Armenia)	FW	7 March 1995 (aged 17)	Academy	2012		0	0
	Ricardo Jesus	(Brazil)	FW	16 May 1985 (aged 26)	Spartak Nalchik	2008		19	2
Away on loan
20	Moussa Maâzou	(Niger)	FW	25 August 1988 (aged 23)	Lokeren	2009		19	3
23	Nika Piliyev	(Russia)	MF	21 March 1991 (aged 21)	Lokomotiv Moscow	2009		7	0
34	Aleksei Nikitin	(Russia)	DF	27 January 1992 (aged 20)	Academy	2009		0	0
49	Aleksandr Vasilyev	(Russia)	MF	23 January 1991 (aged 21)	Academy	2009		1	0
54	Uroš Ćosić	(Serbia)	DF	24 October 1992 (aged 19)	Red Star Belgrade	2009		0	0
77	Artur Nigmatullin	(Russia)	GK	17 May 1991 (aged 20)	Luch-Energiya Vladivostok	2008		0	0
	Andrei Vasyanovich	(Russia)	DF	13 June 1988 (aged 23)	Moscow	2010		0	0
	Anton Vlasov	(Russia)	DF	11 May 1989 (aged 23)	Krylia Sovetov-SOK Dimitrovgrad	2008		0	0
	Dawid Janczyk	(Poland)	FW	23 September 1987 (aged 24)	Legia Warsaw	2007		22	3
	Dmitri Ryzhov	(Russia)	FW	26 August 1989 (aged 22)	Krylia Sovetov-SOK Dimitrovgrad	2008		15	0
	Anton Zabolotny	(Russia)	FW	13 June 1991 (aged 20)	Metallurg Lipetsk	2004		0	0
Players that left during the season
9	Vágner Love	(Brazil)	FW	11 June 1984 (aged 27)	Palmeiras	2004		243	117
15	Chidi Odiah	(Nigeria)	DF	17 December 1983 (aged 28)	Sheriff Tiraspol	2004		122	5
44	Marsel Safin	(Russia)	MF	23 June 1993 (aged 18)	Academy	2011		0	0
54	Stepan Ryabokon	(Russia)	DF	22 April 1993 (aged 19)	Rotor Volgograd	2011		0	0
58	Mukhammad Sultonov	(Russia)	FW	22 December 1992 (aged 19)	Academy	2010		0	0
77	Vladimir Gabulov	(Russia)	GK	19 October 1983 (aged 28)	loan from Anzhi Makhachkala	2011	2011	13	0
	Yevgeny Pomazan	(Russia)	GK	31 January 1989 (aged 23)	Kuban Krasnodar	2008		3	0
	Luboš Kalouda	(Czech Republic)	MF	20 May 1987 (aged 24)	1.FC Brno	2008		8	0

== Transfers ==
=== Winter 2010–11 ===
In: Note: Flags indicate national team as defined under FIFA eligibility rules; some limited exceptions apply. Players may hold more than one non-FIFA nationality.

No.	Pos.	Nation	Player
5	DF	RUS	Viktor Vasin (from (Russia) Spartak Nalchik)
19	MF	LAT	Aleksandrs Cauņa (on loan from (Latvia) Skonto)
23	MF	RUS	Nika Piliyev (end of loan to (Russia) Amkar Perm)
44	MF	RUS	Marsel Safin (from Youth Team)
54	DF	RUS	Stepan Ryabokon (from (Russia) Rotor Volgograd)
52	MF	RUS	Ravil Netfullin (from (Russia) Moscow)
55	MF	RUS	Batraz Khadartsev (from Youth Team)
56	MF	RUS	Suleyman Abdullin (from Youth Team)
77	DF	RUS	Pavel Drozdov (from Youth Team)
80	MF	RUS	David Khurtsidze (from Youth Team)
95	GK	RUS	Sergei Revyakin (from Youth Team)

Out: Note: Flags indicate national team as defined under FIFA eligibility rules; some limited exceptions apply. Players may hold more than one non-FIFA nationality.

No.	Pos.	Nation	Player
32	MF	RUS	Kirill Lapidus (to (Russia) Volgar-Gazprom Astrakhan)
40	GK	RUS	Stanislav Plokhikh (to (Russia) Avangard Kursk)
43	MF	RUS	Leonid Mushnikov (to (Russia) Irtysh Omsk)
44	MF	RUS	Dmitri Zameshayev (released)
46	MF	RUS	Aleksandr Stolyarenko (to (Russia) Akademiya Togliatti)
47	DF	RUS	Kirill Suslov (to (Russia) Dynamo Barnaul)
51	MF	RUS	Aleksei Kiselyov (to (Russia) Istra)
53	FW	RUS	Sergei Sipatov (to (Russia) Krylia Sovetov Samara)
54	DF	SRB	Uroš Ćosić (on loan to (Serbia) Red Star Belgrade)
56	DF	RUS	Anatoli Stukalov (to (Kazakhstan) Tobol)
60	MF	GEO	Nika Dzalamidze (end of loan from (Georgia (country)) Baia Zugdidi)
66	DF	RUS	Igor Dragunov (to (Latvia) Jūrmala)
77	GK	RUS	Artur Nigmatullin (on loan to (Russia) Mordovia Saransk)
—	GK	RUS	Veniamin Mandrykin (retired, previously on loan to (Russia) Dynamo Bryansk)
—	GK	RUS	Yevgeny Pomazan (on loan to (Russia) Spartak Nalchik, previously on loan to (Russia) Ural Sverdlovsk Oblast)
—	DF	RUS	Anton Grigoryev (to (Russia) Alania Vladikavkaz, previously on loan to (Russia) Kuban Krasnodar)
—	DF	RUS	Viktor Klimeyev (to (Russia) Mashuk-KMV Pyatigorsk, previously on loan to (Russia) Nosta Novotroitsk)
—	DF	RUS	Maksim Potapov (to (Russia) Torpedo Armavir, previously on loan to (Russia) Astrakhan)
—	DF	RUS	Dmitri Protopopov (released, previously on loan to (Russia) Dynamo Stavropol)
—	DF	RUS	Andrei Vasyanovich (on loan to (Russia) Zhemchuzhina-Sochi, previously on loan to (Russia) Spartak Nalchik)
—	DF	RUS	Anton Vlasov (on loan to (Russia) Gazovik Orenburg, previously on loan to (Russia) Khimik Dzerzhinsk)
—	MF	CZE	Luboš Kalouda (on loan to (Ukraine) Oleksandria)
—	MF	RUS	Maksim Fyodorov (released, previously on loan to (Russia) Dynamo Bryansk)
—	MF	RUS	Aleksandr Kudryavtsev (to (Russia) Gornyak Uchaly, previously on loan to (Russia) Tyumen)
—	FW	POL	Dawid Janczyk (on loan to (Poland) Korona Kielce, previously on loan to (Belgium) Germinal Beerschot)
—	FW	BRA	Ricardo Jesus (on loan to (Brazil) Ponte Preta, previously on loan to (Russia) Spartak Nalchik)
—	FW	NIG	Ouwo Moussa Maazou (on loan to (France) AS Monaco, previously on loan to (France) Bordeaux)
—	FW	RUS	Dmitri Ryzhov (on loan to (Russia) Mordovia Saransk, previously on loan to (Russia) Ural Sverdlovsk Oblast)
—	FW	RUS	Anton Zabolotny (on loan to (Russia) Ural Sverdlovsk Oblast, previously on loan to (Russia) Volgar-Gazprom Astrakhan)

=== Summer 2011 ===
In: Note: Flags indicate national team as defined under FIFA eligibility rules; some limited exceptions apply. Players may hold more than one non-FIFA nationality.

No.	Pos.	Nation	Player
19	MF	LAT	Aleksandrs Cauņa (from (Latvia) Skonto, previously on loan)
20	FW	NIG	Ouwo Moussa Maazou (end of loan to (France) AS Monaco)
30	GK	RUS	Vladimir Gabulov (on loan from (Russia) Anzhi Makhachkala)
53	DF	RUS	Andrei Semyonov (from (Russia) Lokomotiv Moscow)
57	MF	RUS	Aleksandr Vasyukov (from (Russia) Lokomotiv Moscow)
—	FW	RUS	Anton Zabolotny (end of loan to (Russia) Ural)

Out: Note: Flags indicate national team as defined under FIFA eligibility rules; some limited exceptions apply. Players may hold more than one non-FIFA nationality.

No.	Pos.	Nation	Player
20	FW	NIG	Ouwo Moussa Maazou (on loan to (Belgium) Zulte Waregem)
44	MF	RUS	Marsel Safin (to (Russia) Znamya Truda Orekhovo-Zuyevo)
54	DF	RUS	Stepan Ryabokon (to (Russia) Rotor Volgograd)
—	GK	RUS	Artur Nigmatullin (on loan to (Russia) Ural Sverdlovsk Oblast, previously on loan to (Russia) Mordovia Saransk)
—	GK	RUS	Yevgeny Pomazan (to (Russia) Anzhi Makhachkala, previously on loan to (Russia) Spartak Nalchik)
—	FW	POL	Dawid Janczyk (on loan to (Ukraine) Oleksandria, previously on loan to (Poland) Korona Kielce)

=== Winter 2011–12 ===
In: Note: Flags indicate national team as defined under FIFA eligibility rules; some limited exceptions apply. Players may hold more than one non-FIFA nationality.

No.	Pos.	Nation	Player
3	MF	SWE	Pontus Wernbloom (from (Netherlands) AZ)
18	MF	NGR	Ahmed Musa (from (Netherlands) VVV-Venlo)
29	MF	KOR	Kim In-Sung (from (South Korea) Gangneung City)
39	DF	RUS	Vyacheslav Karavayev
—	FW	BRA	Ricardo Jesus (end of loan to (Brazil) Ponte Preta)

Out: Note: Flags indicate national team as defined under FIFA eligibility rules; some limited exceptions apply. Players may hold more than one non-FIFA nationality.

No.	Pos.	Nation	Player
9	FW	BRA	Vágner Love (to (Brazil) Flamengo)
15	DF	NGR	Chidi Odiah (released)
23	MF	RUS	Nika Piliyev (on loan to (Slovakia) Slovan Bratislava)
30	GK	RUS	Vladimir Gabulov (end of loan from (Russia) Anzhi Makhachkala)
34	DF	RUS	Aleksei Nikitin (on loan to (Russia) Yenisey Krasnoyarsk)
49	MF	RUS	Aleksandr Vasilyev (on loan to (Russia) Yenisey Krasnoyarsk)
58	FW	RUS	Mukhammad Sultonov (to (Russia) Lokomotiv-2 Moscow)
—	DF	RUS	Andrei Vasyanovich (on loan to (Russia) Dynamo Bryansk)
—	MF	CZE	Luboš Kalouda
—	FW	RUS	Anton Zabolotny (on loan to (Russia) Dynamo Bryansk)

== Friendlies ==
=== Marbella Cup 2012 ===
3 February 2012	Guangzhou Evergrande (China)	1–0	(Russia) CSKA Moscow	Marbella, Spain
12:00 UTC+1	Qin 87'	Summary		Stadium: Estadio Municipal de Marbella

== Competitions ==
=== UEFA Europa League ===
==== Knockout stage ====
17 February 2011 Round of 32 Leg 1	PAOK (Greece)	0 – 1	(Russia) CSKA Moscow	Thessaloniki, Greece
23:05 MSK (UTC+3)	Vieirinha (yellow card) 90'	Report	Necid 29'; Nababkin (yellow card) 31'; Mamayev (yellow card) 57'	Stadium: Toumba Stadium; Attendance: 22,245; Referee: Andre Marriner (England)

22 February 2011 Round of 32 Leg 2	CSKA Moscow (Russia)	1 – 1 (2 – 1 agg.)	(Greece) PAOK	Moscow, Russia
20:00 MSK (UTC+3)	Necid (yellow card) 44'; Vagner Love (penalty missed) 80; Ignashevich 80'	Report	Salpingidis (yellow card) 59'; Muslimović 67'; Krešić (yellow card) 79'; García (yellow card) 90'; Cirillo (yellow card) 90'	Stadium: Luzhniki Stadium; Attendance: 10,500; Referee: Laurent Duhamel (France)

10 March 2011 Round of 16 Leg 1	CSKA Moscow (Russia)	0 – 1	(Portugal) Porto	Moscow, Russia
21:00 MSK (UTC+3)	Šemberas (yellow card) 19'; Vágner Love (yellow card) 66'	Report	Otamendi (yellow card) 63'; Guarín 70'	Stadium: Luzhniki Stadium; Attendance: 19,994; Referee: Robert Schörgenhofer (Austria)

18 March 2011 Round of 16 Leg 2	Porto (Portugal)	2 – 1 (3 – 1 agg.)	(Russia) CSKA Moscow	Porto, Portugal
23:05 MSK (UTC+3)	Hulk 1'; Guarín 24'; Fucile (yellow card) 37'	Report	Tošić 29' (yellow card) 45'; Ignashevich (yellow card) 31'; Aldonin (yellow card) 48'; Vágner Love (yellow card) 72'; Honda (yellow card) 84'	Stadium: Estádio do Dragão; Attendance: 32,712; Referee: Kevin Blom (Netherlands)

=== Russian Super Cup ===
6 March 2011	Zenit St. Petersburg	1 – 0	CSKA Moscow	Krasnodar
13:00 MSK (UTC+3)	Ionov 57'	Report		Stadium: Kuban Stadium; Attendance: 22,500; Referee: Aleksei Nikolaev

Zenit	CSKA

GK	16	(Russia) Vyacheslav Malafeev (c)
DF	2	(Russia) Aleksandr Anyukov
DF	3	(Portugal) Bruno Alves
DF	5	(Portugal) Fernando Meira
DF	24	(Serbia) Aleksandar Luković
MF	10	(Portugal) Danny	(yellow card) 55'
MF	15	(Russia) Roman Shirokov
MF	18	(Russia) Konstantin Zyryanov
MF	25	(Russia) Sergei Semak	(substituted off) 83'
MF	27	(Russia) Igor Denisov	(yellow card) 7'
FW	8	(Serbia) Danko Lazović	(substituted off) 55'
Substitutes:
GK	30	(Belarus) Yuri Zhevnov
DF	50	(Russia) Igor Cheminava
MF	20	(Russia) Viktor Fayzulin
MF	23	(Hungary) Szabolcs Huszti	(substituted on) 83'
MF	57	(Russia) Aleksei Ionov	(substituted on) 55'
Manager:
(Italy) Luciano Spalletti Assistant referees: Aleksei Lebedev (Saint Petersburg); Viktor Kulagin (Moscow); Fourth official: Vladislav Bezborodov (Saint Petersburg)

GK	35	(Russia) Igor Akinfeev (c)
DF	4	(Russia) Sergei Ignashevich	(yellow card) 18'
DF	14	(Russia) Kirill Nababkin
DF	24	(Russia) Vasili Berezutski
DF	42	(Russia) Georgi Shchennikov
MF	7	(Japan) Keisuke Honda
MF	10	(Russia) Alan Dzagoev	(yellow card) 31'	(substituted off) 80'
MF	17	(Russia) Pavel Mamayev
MF	22	(Russia) Evgeni Aldonin
FW	8	(Ivory Coast) Seydou Doumbia
FW	9	(Brazil) Vagner Love
Substitutes:
GK	1	(Russia) Sergey Chepchugov
DF	2	(Lithuania) Deividas Šemberas
DF	6	(Russia) Aleksei Berezutski
MF	25	(Bosnia and Herzegovina) Elvir Rahimić
FW	89	(Czech Republic) Tomáš Necid	(substituted on) 80'
Manager:
(Russia) Leonid Slutsky

=== Russian Premier League ===
==== First phase ====
===== Results by round =====
Round	1	2	3	4	5	6	7	8	9	10	11	12	13	14	15	16	17	18	19	20	21	22	23	24	25	26	27	28	29	30
Ground	H	H	A	H	A	H	A	H	A	H	A	H	A	H	A	A	H	A	H	A	H	A	H	A	H	A	H	A	H	A
Result	W	D	W	W	D	L	D	W	W	D	W	W	W	W	W	W	W	D	L	D	W	D	L	D	W	D	D	W	W	D

Updated to match(es) played on 5 November 2011. Source: See results
A = Away; H = Home; W = Win; D = Draw; L = Loss

===== Results =====
13 March 2011 1	CSKA Moscow	2 – 0	Amkar Perm	Moscow
17:15 MSK (UTC+3)	Nababkin (yellow card) 23'; Ignashevich 45' (pen.), 48'; Šemberas (yellow card) 75'	Report	Sirakov (yellow card) 10'; Belorukov (yellow card) 44'; Ristić (yellow card) 46'; Popov (yellow card) 49'	Stadium: Luzhniki Stadium; Attendance: 7,848; Referee: Vyacheslav Popov

21 March 2011 2	Krylia Sovetov	Postponed	CSKA Moscow	Samara
19:30 MSK (UTC+3)				Stadium: Metallurg Stadium
Note: The Russian Championship second match-day fixture Krylia Sovetov vs CSKA Moscow was postopned because of the bad pitch condition at Metallurg Stadium in Samara.

3 April 2011 3	CSKA Moscow	1 – 1	Krasnodar	Moscow
18:30 MSK (UTC+3)	Necid 20'; Šemberas (yellow card) 43'	Report	Picușceac 52'; Vranješ (yellow card) 70'; Shipitsin (yellow card) 82'	Stadium: Arena Khimki; Attendance: 9,607; Referee: Vladimir Kazmenko

10 April 2011 4	Zenit St.Petersburg	0 – 3	CSKA Moscow	Saint Petersburg
18:30 MSK (UTC+3)	Denisov (yellow card) 9'; Alves (yellow card) 18'; Shirokov (yellow card) 45'; Anyukov (yellow card) 78'; Fayzulin (yellow card) 90'	Report	Dzagoev (yellow card) 24'; Akinfeev (yellow card) 60'; Nababkin (yellow card) 60'; Shchennikov (yellow card) 80'; Oliseh (yellow card) 90'	Stadium: Petrovsky Stadium; Attendance: 21,400; Referee: Igor Egorov
Note: The match originally ended 1–1 but was awarded by the FA 0–3 due to Zenit fielding an ineligible player.

17 April 2011 5	CSKA Moscow	2 – 0	Rubin Kazan	Moscow
16:45 MSK (UTC+3)	González 27'; Doumbia 50'; Oliseh (yellow card) 79'; Necid (yellow card) 84'	Report	Kuzmin (yellow card) 19'; Bocchetti (yellow card) 73' (yellow-red card) 83'; Natcho (yellow card) 90'	Stadium: Arena Khimki; Attendance: 12,000; Referee: Vladislav Bezborodov

24 April 2011 6	Tom Tomsk	1 – 1	CSKA Moscow	Tomsk
12:45 MSK (UTC+3)	Kanunnikov 60'	Report	Doumbia 28'; Ignashevich (yellow card) 76'	Stadium: Trud Stadium; Attendance: 11,200; Referee: Vyacheslav Popov

30 April 2011 7	CSKA Moscow	0 – 1	Spartak Moscow	Moscow
14:00 MSK (UTC+3)	Nababkin (yellow card) 37'	Report	Suchý (yellow card) 22'; Ari 78'	Stadium: Luzhniki Stadium; Attendance: 51,000; Referee: Yuri Baskakov

8 May 2011 8	Dynamo	2 – 2	CSKA Moscow	Moscow
14:00 MSK (UTC+3)	Sapeta (yellow card) 43'; Voronin 45'; Wilkshire (yellow card) 69'; Lomić 90'	Report	Ignashevich 4'; Shchennikov (yellow card) 40'; Aldonin (yellow card) 49'; Doumbia 81'; Dzagoev (yellow card) 83'	Stadium: Arena Khimki; Attendance: 14,764; Referee: Aleksei Nikolaev

15 May 2011 9	CSKA Moscow	2 – 1	Rostov	Moscow
20:30 MSK (UTC+3)	Necid 29'; Dzagoev (yellow card) 32'; Mamayev 44'	Report	Grigoryev (yellow card) 26'; Gațcan (yellow card) 32'; Česnauskis (yellow card) 34'; Saláta 47'; Khokhlov (yellow card) 53'	Stadium: Arena Khimki; Attendance: 6,000; Referee: Mikhail Vilkov

20 May 2011 10	Volga Nizhny Novgorod	Postponed	CSKA Moscow	Nizhny Novgorod
				Stadium: Lokomotiv Stadium
Note: The Russian Championship tenth match-day fixture Volga Nizhny Novgorod vs CSKA Moscow was postopned due to a clash with the CSKA's participation in the Russian Cup Final.

25 May 2011 2 (rearranged)	Krylia Sovetov	0 – 3	CSKA Moscow	Samara
19:00 MSK (UTC+3)	Pryyomov (yellow card) 32'; Samsonov (yellow card) 51'; Đorđević (yellow card) 84'; Pečnik	Report	Honda 14', 45'; Ignashevich (yellow card) 76'; Tošić 85'; Šemberas (yellow card) 64' (yellow-red card) 90'	Stadium: Metallurg Stadium; Attendance: 16,000; Referee: Vladislav Bezborodov

29 May 2011 11	CSKA Moscow	1 – 1	Kuban	Moscow
19:00 MSK (UTC+3)	Vágner Love (yellow card) 42'; Mamayev (yellow card) 63'; Necid 67'	Report	Davydov 80'; Zhavnerchik (yellow card) 90'	Stadium: Arena Khimki; Attendance: 8,150; Referee: Alexander Yegorov

10 June 2011 12	Terek Grozny	3 – 4	CSKA Moscow	Grozny
18:45 MSK (UTC+3)	Kobenko (yellow card) 56'; Maurício 86', 88'	Report	Doumbia 19' (yellow card) 45'; Vágner Love 36', 80'; Honda 52'	Stadium: Akhmat-Arena; Attendance: 21,000; Referee: Stanislav Sukhina

14 June 2011 13	CSKA Moscow	3 – 0	Anzhi Makhachkala	Moscow
20:00 MSK (UTC+3)	Vágner Love 5' (yellow card) 40'; Honda 27'; Mamayev (yellow card) 33'; Aldonin (yellow card) 53'; Dzagoev 61'	Report	Angbwa (yellow card) 21'; Boussoufa (yellow card) 33'	Stadium: Arena Khimki; Attendance: 7,000; Referee: Vyacheslav Popov

18 June 2011 14	Spartak Nalchik	0 – 2	CSKA Moscow	Nalchik
18:45 MSK (UTC+3)	Siradze (yellow card) 65'	Report	Doumbia 19' (yellow card) 26'; Ignashevich 65' (pen.); Vágner Love (yellow card) 82'	Stadium: Spartak Stadium; Attendance: 5,000; Referee: Vladislav Bezborodov

22 June 2011 15	CSKA Moscow	3 – 1	Lokomotiv Moscow	Moscow
20:00 MSK (UTC+3)	Doumbia 13', 58'; Vágner Love (yellow card) 29'; Tošić 65'	Report	Maicon (yellow card) 28'; Ďurica 30'; Gatagov (yellow card) 81'	Stadium: Arena Khimki; Attendance: 16,000; Referee: Yuri Baskakov

26 June 2011 16	Amkar Perm	0 – 2	CSKA Moscow	Perm
16:30 MSK (UTC+3)	Belorukov (yellow card) 66'; Peev (yellow card) 90'	Report	Doumbia 8', 84'	Stadium: Zvezda Stadium; Attendance: 14,300; Referee: Mikhail Vilkov

21 July 2011 10 (rearranged)	Volga Nizhny Novgorod	0 – 2	CSKA Moscow	Nizhny Novgorod
19:30 MSK (UTC+3)	Grigalava (yellow card) 33'; R.Ajinjal (yellow card) 55'	Report	Vágner Love 26', 65'	Stadium: Lokomotiv Stadium; Attendance: 17,000; Referee: Vitali Meshkov

25 July 2011 17	CSKA Moscow	2 – 1	Krylia Sovetov	Moscow
19:30 MSK (UTC+3)	Vágner Love (yellow card) 7'; Doumbia 16'; Honda 40'; Dzagoev (yellow card) 47'	Report	Bobyor (yellow card) 32'; Taranov (yellow card) 38' (yellow-red card) 58'; Doumbia 43' (o.g.)	Stadium: Arena Khimki; Attendance: 7,000; Referee: Igor Egorov

31 July 2011 18	Krasnodar	1 – 1	CSKA Moscow	Krasnodar
20:00 MSK (UTC+3)	Movsisyan (penalty missed) 32; Martynovich (yellow card) 33' (yellow-red card) 85'; Mikheyev 60'; Shipitsin (yellow card) 70'; Usminskiy (yellow card) 90'	Report	Honda 7'; Nababkin (yellow card) 31' (yellow-red card) 72'; Vágner Love (yellow card) 77'; V.Berezutski (yellow card) 90'	Stadium: Kuban Stadium; Attendance: 23,700; Referee: Sergey Lapochkin

6 August 2011 19	CSKA Moscow	0 – 2	Zenit St.Petersburg	Moscow
18:45 MSK (UTC+3)	Ignashevich (yellow card) 64'; Doumbia (yellow card) 71'; Vágner Love (yellow card) 79'; Rahimić (yellow card) 88'	Report	Zyryanov (yellow card) 16'; Kerzhakov 54'; Anyukov 55'; Fayzulin (yellow card) 79'	Stadium: Arena Khimki; Attendance: 18,000; Referee: Aleksei Nikolaev

13 August 2011 20	Rubin Kazan	1 – 1	CSKA Moscow	Kazan, Tatarstan
18:30 MSK (UTC+3)	Natcho 33' (pen.); Kuzmin (yellow card) 35'; Kaleshin (yellow card) 52' (yellow-red card) 66'; Sharonov (yellow card) 61'	Report	Rahimić (yellow card) 27'; Mamayev (yellow card) 33'; Ignashevich (penalty missed) 67; A.Berezutski (yellow card) 84'; Dzagoev 90+4'	Stadium: Central Stadium; Attendance: 24,750; Referee: Stanislav Sukhina

20 August 2011 21	CSKA Moscow	3 – 0	Tom Tomsk	Moscow
18:00 MSK (UTC+3)	V.Berezutski (yellow card) 36'; Doumbia 51', 68'; Honda 63'	Report	Sosnovski (yellow card) 34'; Golyshev (yellow card) 59'; Stroyev (yellow card) 71'	Stadium: Arena Khimki; Attendance: 7,000; Referee: Vitali Meshkov

28 August 2011 22	Spartak Moscow	2 – 2	CSKA Moscow	Moscow
19:00 MSK (UTC+3)	Parshivlyuk (yellow card) 16'; Welliton (yellow card) 30' (goal) 45+3' de Zeeuw (yellow card) 33'; Pareja (yellow card) 47'; Emenike 75'; D.Kombarov (yellow card) 84'	Report	V.Berezutski (yellow card) 43'; Doumbia 51'; Tošić 69'	Stadium: Luzhniki Stadium; Attendance: 58,572; Referee: Sergey Karasev

11 September 2011 23	CSKA Moscow	0 – 4	Dynamo Moscow	Moscow
14:00 MSK (UTC+3)	Aldonin (yellow card) 19'; Mamayev (yellow card) 30'; Dzagoev (yellow card) 60'	Report	Voronin 36'; Kurányi 39' (yellow card) 40'; Granat (yellow card) 43'; Yusupov (yellow card) 61'; Fernández 69'; Kokorin 90+2'	Stadium: Arena Khimki; Attendance: 15,000; Referee: Maksim Layushkin

18 September 2011 24	Rostov	1 – 1	CSKA Moscow	Rostov
14:00 MSK (UTC+3)	Kriglov 5'; Kalachev (yellow card) 41'; Bayramyan (yellow card) 67'; Khagush (yellow card) 74'	Report	Doumbia 65'	Stadium: Olimp-2; Attendance: 15,000; Referee: Mikhail Vilkov

24 September 2011 25	CSKA Moscow	3 – 1	Volga Nizhny Novgorod	Moscow
18:15 MSK (UTC+3)	Doumbia 6'; Vágner Love (yellow card) 7'; Dzagoev 64'; Ignashevich 84' (pen.)	Report	Bibilov 17'; Getigezhev (yellow card) 35' (yellow-red card) 49'; Yeshchenko (yellow card) 47'; Malyarov (yellow card) 51'; Arziani (yellow card) 81'; Buivolov (yellow card) 83'	Stadium: Arena Khimki; Attendance: 5,000; Referee: Vladislav Bezborodov

2 October 2011 26	Kuban	0 – 0	CSKA Moscow	Krasnodar
17:00 MSK (UTC+3)	Varga (yellow card) 47'; Armaș (yellow card) 90'	Report	Aldonin (yellow card) 44'; Nababkin (yellow card) 70'; Šemberas (yellow card) 77'; V.Berezutski (yellow card) 77'	Stadium: Kuban Stadium; Attendance: 27.892; Referee: Stanislav Sukhina

15 October 2011 27	CSKA Moscow	2 – 2	Terek Grozny	Moscow
14:00 MSK (UTC+3)	Rahimić (yellow card) 29'; Vágner Love 40' (yellow card) 60'; Doumbia 47'; Šemberas (yellow card) 90'	Report	Pavlenko 67'; Maurício 68'; Amelyanchuk (yellow card) 76'	Stadium: Arena Khimki; Attendance: 3,200; Referee: Sergey Lapochkin

23 October 2011 28	Anzhi	3 – 5	CSKA Moscow	Makhachkala
19:30 MSK (UTC+3)	Eto'o 4'; Jucilei (yellow card) 68'; Holenda 86', 90'	Report	Doumbia 24', 46', 80'; Vágner Love 62'; Dzagoev 82'	Stadium: Dynamo Stadium; Attendance: 15,000; Referee: Vitali Meshkov

28 October 2011 29	CSKA Moscow	4 – 0	Spartak Nalchik	Moscow
19:15 MSK (UTC+3)	Ignashevich (penalty missed) 10'; Vágner Love 34' (red card) 75'; Doumbia 83', 90+1', 90+3'	Report	Ovsiyenko (yellow card) 9'; Zahirović (yellow card) 58'; Aravin (yellow card) 63'; Fomin (yellow card) 70'; Kulikov (yellow card) 79'	Stadium: Arena Khimki; Attendance: 4,500; Referee: Mikhail Vilkov

5 November 2011 30	Lokomotiv Moscow	1 – 1	CSKA Moscow	Moscow
20:45 MSK (UTC+3)	Ignatyev 11'; Ibričić (yellow card) 45'; Shishkin (yellow card) 90'	Report	Nababkin (yellow card) 45'; Doumbia 64'; Dzagoev (yellow card) 90'	Stadium: Lokomotiv Stadium; Attendance: 21,698; Referee: Sergey Karasev

===== Table =====
Pos	Team	Pld	W	D	L	GF	GA	GD	Pts	Qualification
1	Zenit St. Petersburg	30	17	10	3	59	25	+34	61	Qualification to Championship group
2	CSKA Moscow	30	16	11	3	58	29	+29	59	Qualification to Championship group
3	Dynamo Moscow	30	16	7	7	51	30	+21	55	Qualification to Championship group
4	Spartak Moscow	30	15	8	7	48	33	+15	53 (Note: Spartak Moscow ahead of Lokomotiv Moscow on head-to-head points; Lokomotiv Moscow–Spartak Moscow 0–2, Spartak Moscow–Lokomotiv Moscow 3–0.)	Qualification to Championship group
5	Lokomotiv Moscow	30	15	8	7	49	30	+19	53	Qualification to Championship group

Source: Russian Premier League
Rules for classification: 1) points; 2) number of wins; 3) head-to-head points; 4) number of head-to-head wins; 5) head-to-head goal difference; 6) number of head-to-head goals scored; 7) number of head-to-head away goals scored; 8) goal difference; 9) number of goals scored; 10) number of away goals scored.

==== Championship group ====
===== Results by round =====
Round	1	2	3	4	5	6	7	8	9	10	11	12	13	14
Ground	H	A	H	H	A	H	A	H	A	A	H	A	H	A
Result	L	L	D	D	W	L	D	D	L	L	W	W	D	L
Position	2	2	2	2	2	2	2	2	4	4	3	2	2	3

Updated to match(es) played on 13 May 2012. Source: See results
A = Away; H = Home; W = Win; D = Draw; L = Loss

===== Results =====
18 November 2011 31	CSKA Moscow	1 – 2	Rubin Kazan	Moscow
20:15 MSK (UTC+3)	Mamayev (yellow card) 34'; Doumbia 36' (pen.) (penalty missed) 55'; Honda (yellow card) 56'; Dzagoev (yellow card) 80'; Ignashevich (yellow card) 86'	Report	Kasaev 16'; Natcho (yellow card) 26'; Ansaldi (yellow card) 35'; Ryazantsev 61'; Bocchetti (yellow card) 79'	Stadium: Luzhniki Stadium; Attendance: 5,774; Referee: Vladislav Bezborodov

27 November 2011 32	Anzhi Makhachkala	2 – 1	CSKA Moscow	Makhachkala
19:30 MSK (UTC+3)	Lakhiyalov 46'; Jucilei (yellow card) 64'; Eto'o 89' (pen.); Agalarov (yellow card) 90'	Report	Nababkin (yellow card) 33'; Šemberas (yellow card) 37'; Vágner Love 47'; Chepchugov (red card) 86'; Mamayev (yellow card) 90'	Stadium: Dynamo Stadium; Attendance: 15,000; Referee: Stanislav Sukhina

3 March 2012 33	CSKA Moscow	2 – 2	Zenit St.Petersburg	Moscow
16:00 MSK (UTC+3)	A.Berezutski (yellow card) 6'; Dzagoev 17' (yellow card) 61'; Tošić (yellow card) 41'; Musa 68'; Wernbloom (yellow card) 86'; V.Berezutski (yellow card) 90'; Mamayev (yellow card) 90'	Report	Kerzhakov 1', 56'; Lombaerts (yellow card) 51'; Anyukov (yellow card) 69'	Stadium: Luzhniki Stadium; Attendance: 22,065; Referee: Maksim Layushkin

9 March 2012 34	CSKA Moscow	1 – 1	Dynamo Moscow	Moscow
14:00 MSK (UTC+3)	Doumbia 3'; Shchennikov (yellow card) 30'; Wernbloom (yellow card) 49'	Report	Dzsudzsák (yellow card) 23'; Semshov (yellow card) 53' (goal) 75'; Granat (yellow card) 57'; Wilkshire (yellow card) 90'	Stadium: Luzhniki Stadium; Attendance: 11,054; Referee: Mikhail Vilkov

19 March 2012 35	Spartak Moscow	1 – 2	CSKA Moscow	Moscow
19:30 MSK (UTC+3)	Dzyuba 51' (yellow card) 90'; Pareja (yellow card) 61'; Carioca (yellow card) 89'	Report	Tošić 37'; Wernbloom (yellow card) 54'; Doumbia 62'	Stadium: Luzhniki Stadium; Attendance: 51,255; Referee: Vladislav Bezborodov

24 March 2012 36	CSKA Moscow	0 – 2	Lokomotiv Moscow	Moscow
16:15 MSK (UTC+3)		Report	Pavlyuchenko 10'; Caicedo 34'; Yeshchenko (yellow card) 62'; Ďurica (yellow card) 90'	Stadium: Luzhniki Stadium; Attendance: 15,103; Referee: Aleksei Eskov

31 March 2012 37	Kuban Krasnodar	1 – 1	CSKA Moscow	Krasnodar
16:15 MSK (UTC+4)	Lolo (yellow card) 45'; Kulik (yellow card) 75'; Sekret 88'	Report	Wernbloom (yellow card) 45'; Tošić (yellow card) 59'; Doumbia 71'	Stadium: Kuban Stadium; Attendance: 26,423; Referee: Igor Egorov

7 April 2012 38	CSKA Moscow	0 – 0	Anzhi Makhachkala	Moscow
18:30 MSK (UTC+4)	Šemberas (yellow card) 47'; Rahimić (yellow card) 90'	Report	Logashov (yellow card) 27'	Stadium: Luzhniki Stadium; Attendance: 9,560; Referee: Vitali Meshkov

14 April 2012 39	Zenit St.Petersburg	2 – 0	CSKA Moscow	Saint-Petersburg
19:00 MSK (UTC+4)	Bystrov 64'; Arshavin 89'	Report	A.Berezutski (yellow card) 20'; Musa (yellow card) 75'; Wernbloom (yellow card) 82'	Stadium: Petrovsky Stadium; Attendance: 21,500; Referee: Mikhail Vilkov

21 April 2012 40	Dynamo Moscow	1 – 0	CSKA Moscow	Moscow
16:30 MSK (UTC+4)	Misimović 18'; Granat (yellow card) 54' Dzsudzsák (yellow card) 58'; Wilkshire (yellow card) 74'	Report	Mamayev (yellow card) 20'; Wernbloom (yellow card) 29'; Honda (yellow card) 69'; Tošić (yellow card) 90'	Stadium: Arena Khimki; Attendance: 15,337; Referee: Sergei Karasev

28 April 2012 41	CSKA Moscow	2 – 1	Spartak Moscow	Moscow
19:00 MSK (UTC+4)	Honda (yellow card) 22'; Tošić 23', 57'; Necid (yellow card) 90'	Report	Kombarov (yellow card) 13' (yellow-red card) 81'; Dzyuba 44'; Bryzgalov (yellow card) 66'; McGeady (yellow card) 71'; Suchý (yellow card) 86'; Emenike (yellow card) 88'	Stadium: Luzhniki Stadium; Attendance: 50,000; Referee: Aleksei Nikolaev

2 May 2012 42	Lokomotiv Moscow	0 – 3	CSKA Moscow	Moscow
20:45 MSK (UTC+4)	da Costa (red card) 7'; Glushakov (yellow card) 32'; Shishkin (yellow card) 87'	Report	Doumbia 8'; Tošić 78', 88'	Stadium: Lokomotiv Stadium; Attendance: 14,087; Referee: Vitali Meshkov

8 May 2012 43	CSKA Moscow	0 – 0	Kuban Krasnodar	Moscow
17:00 MSK (UTC+4)	Vasin (yellow card) 62'	Report	Zhavnerchik (yellow card) 25'; Fidler (yellow card) 34'	Stadium: Luzhniki Stadium; Attendance: 9,869; Referee: Aleksei Eskov

13 May 2012 44	Rubin Kazan	3 – 1	CSKA Moscow	Kazan
18:30 MSK (UTC+4)	Valdez 47'; Sharonov (yellow card) 55'; Ryazantsev (yellow card) 77'; Karadeniz 82'; R.Eremenko 88'	Report	Wernbloom (yellow card) 43'; Honda 45'; Vasin (yellow card) 49'; Tošić (yellow card) 84'; Akinfeev (yellow card) 87'	Stadium: Tsentralnyi Stadion; Attendance: 18,472; Referee: Vladislav Bezborodov

===== League table =====
Pos	Team	Pld	W	D	L	GF	GA	GD	Pts	Qualification
1	Zenit St. Petersburg (C)	44	24	16	4	85	40	+45	88	Qualification to Champions League group stage
2	Spartak Moscow	44	21	12	11	69	47	+22	75	Qualification to Champions League play-off round
3	CSKA Moscow	44	19	16	9	72	47	+25	73	Qualification to Europa League play-off round
4	Dynamo Moscow	44	20	12	12	66	50	+16	72	Qualification to Europa League third qualifying round
5	Anzhi Makhachkala	44	19	13	12	54	42	+12	70	Qualification to Europa League second qualifying round
6	Rubin Kazan	44	17	17	10	55	41	+14	68	Qualification to Europa League group stage (Note: Rubin have won the 2011–12 Russian Cup and thus have qualified for the group stage of the 2012–13 UEFA Europa League.)
7	Lokomotiv Moscow	44	18	12	14	59	48	+11	66	
8	Kuban Krasnodar	44	15	16	13	50	45	+5	61	

Source: Russian Premier League
Rules for classification: 1) points; 2) number of wins; 3) head-to-head points; 4) number of head-to-head wins; 5) head-to-head goal difference; 6) number of head-to-head goals scored; 7) number of head-to-head away goals scored; 8) goal difference; 9) number of goals scored; 10) number of away goals scored
(C) Champions

=== Russian Cup ===
==== 2010–11 ====
28 February 2011 Round of 16	CSKA Moscow	1 – 0	Shinnik Yaroslavl	Moscow
19:00 MSK (UTC+3)	Ignashevich 23'; Aldonin (yellow card) 47'	Report	Catînsus (yellow card) 81'	Stadium: Luzhniki Stadium; Attendance: 6,000; Referee: Mikhail Vilkov

20 April 2011 Quarterfinal	Zenit St. Petersburg	0 – 2	CSKA Moscow	Saint Petersburg
20:00 MSK (UTC+3)	Luković (yellow card) 34'; Denisov (yellow card) 40'; Hubočan (yellow card) 56'; Anyukov (yellow card) 60'; Lombaerts (yellow card) 88'	Report	Shchennikov (yellow card) 24'; Doumbia 41'; Ignashevich 58' (pen.); Mamayev (yellow card) 75'	Stadium: Petrovsky Stadium; Attendance: 19,000; Referee: Stanislav Sukhina

11 May 2011 Semifinal	Spartak Moscow	3 – 3 (a.e.t.) (4 – 5 p)	CSKA Moscow	Moscow
19:30 MSK (UTC+3)	Makhmudov (yellow card) 36'; Kombarov 45'; Alex (yellow card) 45'; McGeady (yellow card) 59'; Ari 61'; Ibson 76'; Suchý (yellow card) 110'	Report	Doumbia (yellow card) 9' (goal) 47'; Necid 42'; Honda (yellow card) 70'; Vágner Love 82'; Ignashevich (yellow card) 89'	Stadium: Luzhniki Stadium; Attendance: 46,000; Referee: Igor Egorov
	Penalties
	Makhmudov (penalty scored); McGeady (penalty scored); D.Kombarov (penalty missed); Ari (penalty scored); Dzyuba (penalty scored)		(penalty scored) Necid; (penalty scored) Vágner Love; (penalty scored) Honda; (penalty scored) V.Berezutski; (penalty scored) Ignashevich

21 May 2011 Final	CSKA Moscow	2 – 1	Alania Vladikavkaz	Yaroslavl
19:00 MSK (UTC+3)	Doumbia 13', 69'; Aldonin (yellow card) 35'; Ignashevich (yellow card) 84'	Report	Neco 23'; Gigolayev (yellow card) 39'; Bazayev (yellow card) 43'; Grachyov (yellow card) 51'; Bulgaru (yellow card) 64'; Grigoryev (yellow card) 71'; Gnanou (yellow card) 77'	Stadium: Shinnik Stadium; Attendance: 15,000; Referee: Vladislav Bezborodov

==== 2011–12 ====
17 July 2011 Round of 32	Volgar-Gazprom Astrakhan	1 – 0	CSKA Moscow	Astrakhan
19:00 MSK (UTC+3)	Tuzovskiy (yellow card) 30'; Chochiyev 80'; Komarov (yellow card) 89'; Loktionov (yellow card) 90'; Ponomaryov (yellow card) 90'	Report	A.Berezutski (yellow card) 55'; V.Berezutski (red card) 90'; Nababkin (yellow card) 90'	Stadium: Central Stadium; Attendance: 16,500; Referee: Alexander Yegorov

=== Champions League ===
==== Group stage ====
Pos	Team	Pld	W	D	L	GF	GA	GD	Pts	Qualification
1	(Italy) Internazionale	6	3	1	2	8	7	+1	10	Advance to knockout phase
2	(Russia) CSKA Moscow	6	2	2	2	9	8	+1	8	Advance to knockout phase
3	(Turkey) Trabzonspor	6	1	4	1	3	5	−2	7	Transfer to Europa League
4	(France) Lille	6	1	3	2	6	6	0	6	

Source: Soccerway

14 September 2011 1	Lille (France)	2 – 2	(Russia) CSKA Moscow	Villeneuve-d'Ascq, France
22:45 MSK (UTC+3)	Sow 44'; Baša (yellow card) 45'; Pedretti 57' (yellow card) 70'; Hazard (yellow card) 65'	Report	Nababkin (yellow card) 54'; Doumbia 72', 90'; Dzagoev (yellow card) 77'	Stadium: Stade Lille-Metropole; Attendance: 15,274; Referee: Olegário Benquerença (Portugal)

27 September 2011 2	CSKA Moscow (Russia)	2 – 3	(Italy) Internazionale	Moscow, Russia
20:00 MSK (UTC+3)	Dzagoev 45+3'; Vágner Love 77'	Report	Lúcio 6'; Pazzini 23'; Obi (yellow card) 69'; Zárate 78'; Cambiasso (yellow card) 90'	Stadium: Luzhniki Stadium; Attendance: 35,000; Referee: Craig Thomson (Scotland)

18 October 2011 3	CSKA Moscow (Russia)	3 – 0	(Turkey) Trabzonspor	Moscow, Russia
20:00 MSK (UTC+3)	Mamayev (yellow card) 15'; Doumbia 29', 86'; Cauņa 76'	Report	Głowacki (yellow card) 22'; Zokora (yellow card) 42'; Colman (yellow card) 74'	Stadium: Luzhniki Stadium; Attendance: 18,000; Referee: Mark Clattenburg (England)

2 November 2011 4	Trabzonspor (Turkey)	0 – 0	(Russia) CSKA Moscow	Trabzon, Turkey
22:45 MSK (UTC+3)	Zokora (yellow card) 56'; Balcı (yellow card) 58'	Report	Mamayev (yellow card) 26'; Doumbia (yellow card) 40' (yellow-red card) 74'; Vágner Love (yellow card) 59'	Stadium: Hüseyin Avni Aker Stadium; Attendance: 19,516; Referee: Alberto Undiano Mallenco (Spain)

22 November 2011 5	CSKA Moscow (Russia)	0 – 2	(France) Lille	Moscow, Russia
21:00 MSK (UTC+3)	Nababkin (yellow card) 81'	Report	V.Berezutski 49' (o.g.); Rozehnal (yellow card) 53'; Debuchy (yellow card) 59'; Sow 64'	Stadium: Luzhniki Stadium; Attendance: 19,100; Referee: Pavel Kralovec (Czech)

7 December 2011 6	Internazionale (Italy)	1 – 2	(Russia) CSKA Moscow	Milan, Italy
22:45 MSK (UTC+3)	Cambiasso 51'; Caldirola (yellow card) 64'	Report	Šemberas (yellow card) 22'; Doumbia 50'; Mamayev (yellow card) 63'; Nababkin (yellow card) 69'; V.Berezutski 86'	Stadium: San Siro; Attendance: 23,295; Referee: David Fernández Borbalán (Spain)

==== Knockout Phase ====
21 February 2012 Round of 16 1st Leg	CSKA Moscow (Russia)	1 – 1	(Spain) Real Madrid	Moscow, Russia
21:00 MSK (UTC+3)	Wernbloom (yellow card) 67' (goal) 90+3'	Report	Ronaldo 28'; Alonso (yellow card) 46'; Ramos (yellow card) 72'; Coentrão (yellow card) 82'	Stadium: Luzhniki Stadium; Attendance: 70,000; Referee: Björn Kuipers (Netherlands)

14 March 2012 Round of 16 2nd Leg	Real Madrid (Spain)	4 – 1 (5 – 2 agg.)	(Russia) CSKA Moscow	Madrid, Spain
23:45 MSK (UTC+3)	Higuaín 26'; Alonso (yellow card) 46'; Ronaldo 55', 90+4'; Benzema 70'	Report	Chepchugov (yellow card) 15'; V.Berezutski (yellow card) 32'; Musa (yellow card) 38'; Tošić 77'; Mamayev (yellow card) 83'	Stadium: Santiago Bernabéu Stadium; Attendance: 70,000; Referee: Stéphane Lannoy (France)

== Squad statistics ==
As of match played 13 May 2012

=== Appearances and goals ===
No.	Pos	Nat	Player	Total		Premier League		2010–11 Russian Cup		2011–12 Russian Cup		Europa League		Champions League		Super Cup	
No.	Pos	Nat	Player	Apps	Goals	Apps	Goals	Apps	Goals	Apps	Goals	Apps	Goals	Apps	Goals	Apps	Goals
1	GK	(Russia) RUS	Sergey Chepchugov	13	0	8+1	0	1	0	0	0	0+1	0	2	0	0	0
2	MF	(Lithuania) LTU	Deividas Šemberas	38	1	11+18	1	0+1	0	1	0	3	0	1+3	0	0	0
3	MF	(Sweden) SWE	Pontus Wernbloom	13	1	11	0	0	0	0	0	0	0	2	1	0	0
4	DF	(Russia) RUS	Sergei Ignashevich	55	7	38	4	4	2	0	0	4	1	8	0	1	0
5	DF	(Russia) RUS	Viktor Vasin	4	0	3+1	0	0	0	0	0	0	0	0	0	0	0
6	DF	(Russia) RUS	Aleksei Berezutski	55	0	39+1	0	4	0	1	0	0+2	0	8	0	0	0
7	MF	(Japan) JPN	Keisuke Honda	34	8	22+3	8	1+3	0	0+1	0	2	0	0+1	0	1	0
8	FW	(Ivory Coast) CIV	Seydou Doumbia	58	37	42	28	4	4	1	0	3	0	7	5	1	0
10	MF	(Russia) RUS	Alan Dzagoev	48	6	27+4	5	4	0	1	0	2+1	0	8	1	1	0
11	MF	(Chile) CHI	Mark González	7	1	3+2	1	1	0	0	0	0+1	0	0	0	0	0
14	DF	(Russia) RUS	Kirill Nababkin	48	0	33+1	0	3	0	1	0	4	0	4+1	0	1	0
17	MF	(Russia) RUS	Pavel Mamayev	49	1	26+7	1	3+1	0	1	0	3	0	5+2	0	1	0
18	FW	(Nigeria) NGR	Ahmed Musa	13	1	8+3	1	0	0	0	0	0	0	2	0	0	0
19	MF	(Latvia) LAT	Aleksandrs Cauņa	26	1	4+14	0	0	0	0+1	0	2	0	2+3	1	0	0
21	MF	(Serbia) SRB	Zoran Tošić	50	10	30+6	8	3	0	1	0	3+1	1	5+1	1	0	0
22	MF	(Russia) RUS	Evgeni Aldonin	47	0	27+5	0	2+1	0	0	0	1+2	0	7+1	0	1	0
24	DF	(Russia) RUS	Vasili Berezutski	54	1	36	0	4	0	1	0	4	0	8	1	1	0
25	MF	(Bosnia and Herzegovina) BIH	Elvir Rahimić	14	0	6+6	0	1	0	0	0	0	0	0+1	0	0	0
26	MF	(Liberia) LBR	Sekou Oliseh	48	0	14+24	0	1+1	0	1	0	0+1	0	3+3	0	0	0
29	MF	(South Korea) KOR	Kim In-Sung	1	0	0+1	0	0	0	0	0	0	0	0	0	0	0
35	GK	(Russia) RUS	Igor Akinfeev	37	0	28	0	3	0	1	0	4	0	0	0	1	0
42	DF	(Russia) RUS	Georgi Shchennikov	32	0	20+1	0	1	0	0	0	4	0	3+2	0	1	0
48	MF	(Russia) RUS	Artem Popov	1	0	0+1	0	0	0	0	0	0	0	0	0	0	0
59	DF	(Russia) RUS	Semyon Fedotov	3	0	2	0	0	0	0	0	0	0	1	0	0	0
61	FW	(Russia) RUS	Serder Serderov	1	0	0	0	0	0	0	0	0	0	0+1	0	0	0
89	FW	(Czech Republic) CZE	Tomáš Necid	32	7	15+8	3	1+3	1	0	0	2+2	1	0	0+2	0+1	0
95	GK	(Russia) RUS	Sergei Revyakin	2	0	1+1	0	0	0	0	0	0	0	0	0	0	0
Players who appeared for CSKA Moscow that left during the season:
9	FW	(Brazil) BRA	Vágner Love	40	11	21+4	9	3+1	1	1	0	3	0	6	1	1	0
15	DF	(Nigeria) NGR	Chidi Odiah	3	0	2+1	0	0	0	0	0	0	0	0	0	0	0
30	GK	(Russia) RUS	Vladimir Gabulov	13	0	7	0	0	0	0	0	0	0	6	0	0	0

=== Goal scorers ===
Place	Position	Nation	Number	Name	Premier League	2010-11 Russian Cup	2011-12 Russian Cup	Europa League	Champions League	Super Cup	Total
1	FW	(Ivory Coast)	8	Seydou Doumbia	28	4	0	0	5	0	37
2	FW	(Brazil)	9	Vágner Love	9	1	0	0	1	0	11
3	MF	(Serbia)	21	Zoran Tošić	8	0	0	1	1	0	10
4	MF	(Japan)	7	Keisuke Honda	8	0	0	0	0	0	8
5	DF	(Russia)	4	Sergei Ignashevich	4	2	0	1	0	0	7
6	MF	(Russia)	10	Alan Dzagoev	5	0	0	0	1	0	6
7	FW	(Czech Republic)	89	Tomáš Necid	3	1	0	1	0	0	5
6	DF	(Lithuania)	2	Deividas Šemberas	1	0	0	0	0	0	1
6	MF	(Chile)	13	Mark González	1	0	0	0	0	0	1
6	MF	(Russia)	17	Pavel Mamayev	1	0	0	0	0	0	1
6	FW	(Nigeria)	18	Ahmed Musa	1	0	0	0	0	0	1
6	MF	(Latvia)	19	Aleksandrs Cauņa	0	0	0	0	1	0	1
6	DF	(Russia)	24	Vasili Berezutski	0	0	0	0	1	0	1
6	MF	(Sweden)	3	Pontus Wernbloom	0	0	0	0	1	0	1
				Awarded Goals	3	0	0	0	0	0	3
				Totals	72	8	0	3	11	0	94

=== Disciplinary record ===
Number	Nation	Position	Name	Premier League		2010-11 Russian Cup		2011-12 Russian Cup		Europa League		Champions League		Super Cup		Total	
Number	Nation	Position	Name	Yellow card	Red card	Yellow card	Red card	Yellow card	Red card	Yellow card	Red card	Yellow card	Red card	Yellow card	Red card	Yellow card	Red card
1	(Russia)	GK	Sergey Chepchugov	0	1	0	0	0	0	0	0	1	0	0	0	1	1
2	(Lithuania)	DF	Deividas Šemberas	8	1	0	0	0	0	1	0	1	0	0	0	10	1
3	(Sweden)	MF	Pontus Wernbloom	7	0	0	0	0	0	0	0	1	0	0	0	8	0
4	(Russia)	DF	Sergei Ignashevich	4	0	2	0	0	0	1	0	0	0	1	0	8	0
5	(Russia)	DF	Viktor Vasin	2	0	0	0	0	0	0	0	0	0	0	0	2	0
6	(Russia)	DF	Aleksei Berezutski	3	0	0	0	1	0	0	0	0	0	0	0	4	0
7	(Japan)	MF	Keisuke Honda	3	0	1	0	0	0	1	0	0	0	0	0	5	0
8	(Ivory Coast)	FW	Seydou Doumbia	3	0	1	0	0	0	0	0	2	1	0	0	6	1
10	(Russia)	MF	Alan Dzagoev	8	0	0	0	0	0	0	0	1	0	1	0	10	0
14	(Russia)	DF	Kirill Nababkin	8	1	0	0	1	0	1	0	3	0	0	0	13	1
17	(Russia)	MF	Pavel Mamayev	8	0	1	0	0	0	1	0	4	0	0	0	14	0
18	(Nigeria)	FW	Ahmed Musa	1	0	0	0	0	0	0	0	1	0	0	0	2	0
21	(Serbia)	MF	Zoran Tošić	4	0	0	0	0	0	1	0	0	0	0	0	5	0
22	(Russia)	MF	Evgeni Aldonin	4	0	2	0	0	0	1	0	0	0	0	0	7	0
24	(Russia)	DF	Vasili Berezutski	5	0	0	0	0	1	0	0	1	0	0	0	6	1
25	(Bosnia and Herzegovina)	MF	Elvir Rahimić	4	0	0	0	0	0	0	0	0	0	0	0	4	0
26	(Liberia)	MF	Sekou Oliseh	2	0	0	0	0	0	0	0	0	0	0	0	2	0
35	(Russia)	GK	Igor Akinfeev	2	0	0	0	0	0	0	0	0	0	0	0	2	0
42	(Russia)	DF	Georgi Shchennikov	3	0	1	0	0	0	0	0	0	0	0	0	4	0
89	(Czech Republic)	FW	Tomáš Necid	2	0	0	0	0	0	1	0	0	0	0	0	3	0
Players away on loan:
Players who left CSKA Moscow during the season:
9	(Brazil)	FW	Vágner Love	9	1	0	0	0	0	2	0	1	0	0	0	12	1
			Totals	90	4	8	0	2	1	10	0	16	1	1	0	127	6
