= Ryzkhov =

Ryzkhov is a surname. Notable people with the surname include:

- Nikolai Ryzhkov (born 1929), Soviet official and Russian politician
- Vladimir Ryzhkov (born 1966), Russian historian and politician
- Yevgeniy Ryzhkov (born 1985), Kazakhstani swimmer

== See also ==
- Ryzhov
