= Ryzhov =

Ryzhov (masculine, Russian: Рыжов) or Ryzhova (feminine, Russian: Рыжова) is a Russian surname. Notable people with the surname include:

- Alexander Ryzhov (general) (1895–1950), Soviet general
- Dmitri Ryzhov (born 1989), Russian soccer player
- Ivan Ryzhov (1913–2004), Soviet–Russian actor
- Mikhail Ryzhov (footballer) (born 1981), Russian soccer player
- Mikhail Ryzhov (racewalker) (born 1991), Russian racewalker
- Yuri Ryzhov (footballer) (1952–2015), Russian soccer player
- Antonina Ryzhova (1934–2020), Russian volleyball player
- Kseniya Ryzhova (born 1987), Russian sprinter
