= Yuri Ryzhov =

Yuri Ryzhov may refer to:

- Yuri Ryzhov (footballer)
- Yuri Ryzhov (physicist)
