= Guilherme (footballer, born 1988) =

Brazilian footballer

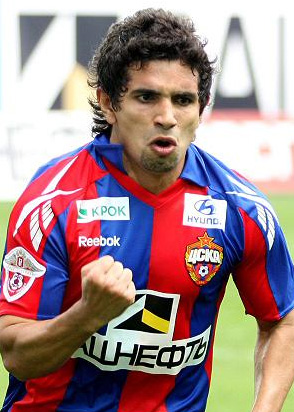
- Guilherme with CSKA Moscow in 2010

Personal information
- Full name: Guilherme Milhomem Gusmão
- Date of birth: 22 October 1988 (age 38)
- Place of birth: Imperatriz, Brazil
- Height: 1.74 m (5 ft 9 in)
- Position: Attacking midfielder

Youth career
- 2001–2002: Real Salvador
- 2003–2007: Cruzeiro

Senior career*
Years	Team	Apps	(Gls)
2007–2009	Cruzeiro	74	(32)
2009–2011	Dynamo Kyiv	13	(5)
2009–2010	→ CSKA Moscow (loan)	19	(8)
2011–2015	Atlético Mineiro	143	(27)
2015	Antalyaspor	13	(2)
2016–2019	Corinthians	47	(8)
2017–2018	→ Atlético Paranaense (loan)	48	(11)
2019	→ Bahia (loan)	11	(1)
2019	→ Fluminense (loan)	8	(0)
2020	América Mineiro	8	(0)
2022–2023	Brusque		
2023	São Joseense	2	(0)
2024	Cianorte	8	(1)
- * Club domestic league appearances and goals

Guilherme Milhomem Gusmão (born 22 October 1988), simply known Guilherme, is a Brazilian former professional footballer who played for an attacking midfielder.

== Career ==
=== Cruzeiro ===
Guilherme made a big impression this at Cruzeiro, who were comfortably top scorers in the Campeonato Brasileiro 2007. Guilherme played as a supporting striker, where he showed vision for decisive passes.

2008 in his second season, he was fifth top scorer with 28 goals.

=== Dynamo Kyiv ===
In February 2009, Dynamo Kyiv signed Guilherme on a five-year deal for a reported €5 million fee with Kléber moving in the opposite direction. Guilherme made his debut for Dynamo on 19 April 2009 as a second-half substitute in a 2–1 loss against Kryvbas Kryvyi Rih. He went on to score a hat-trick in his first game as a starter in the Ukrainian Premier League on 16 May 2009 against Karpaty Lviv at Ukraina Stadium. Dynamo won the game 4–1, with Guilherme also recording an assist.

==== Loan to CSKA Moscow ====
On 29 August 2009, the day Dynamo Kyiv re-signed Andriy Shevchenko, Guilherme joined CSKA Moscow in a one-year loan deal worth $1 million. CSKA also received a right of first refusal on the player. He scored two goals in his first Russian Premier League game against Krylia Sovetov Samara. He returned to Dynamo Kyiv when his loan expired in the summer of 2010 and CSKA refused to pay the transfer fee to buy him out from Dynamo.

=== Atlético Mineiro ===
In March 2011, Atlético Mineiro signed Guilherme on a four-year deal for a reported €5 million. Guilherme made his debut for Galo on 21 May 2011 in a 3–0 win against Atlético Paranaense.

=== Antalyaspor ===
In August 2015, Guilherme rescinded his contract with Atlético and signed with Turkish club Antalyaspor.

=== Corinthians ===
On 19 January 2016, Guilherme returned to Brazil and signed with current national champions Corinthians.

In May, he was loaned to Fluminense until the end of the season.

== Career statistics ==
As of 9 November 2018

Appearances and goals by club, season and competition
Club	Season	League			State League		Cup		Continental		Other		Total	
Club	Season	Division	Apps	Goals	Apps	Goals	Apps	Goals	Apps	Goals	Apps	Goals	Apps	Goals
Cruzeiro	2007	Série A	27	8	5	3	2	0	—		—		34	11
Cruzeiro	2008	Série A	32	18	10	3	—		8 (Note: Appearance(s) in Copa Libertadores)	2	—		50	23
Cruzeiro	Total		59	26	15	6	2	0	8	2	—		84	34
Dynamo Kyiv	2008–09	Ukrainian Premier League	2	3	—		—		—		—		2	3
Dynamo Kyiv	2009–10	Ukrainian Premier League	4	1	—		1	0	—		—		5	1
Dynamo Kyiv	2008–09	Ukrainian Premier League	5	1	—		2	2	1 (Note: Appearance(s) in UEFA Europa League)	0	—		8	3
Dynamo Kyiv	Total		11	5	—		3	2	1	0	—		15	7
CSKA Moscow (loan)	2009	Russian Premier League	5	3	—		—		—		—		5	3
CSKA Moscow (loan)	2010	Russian Premier League	12	5	—		1	2	2 (Note: Appearance(s) in UEFA Champions League)	0	0	0	15	7
CSKA Moscow (loan)	Total		17	8	—		1	2	2	0	0	0	20	10
Atlético Mineiro	2011	Série A	14	2	—		—		—		—		14	2
Atlético Mineiro	2012	Série A	26	3	12	4	2	1	—		—		40	8
Atlético Mineiro	2013	Série A	14	1	8	3	2	1	5	1	—		24	5
Atlético Mineiro	2014	Série A	21	3	11	4	2	2	8	1	—		42	10
Atlético Mineiro	2015	Série A	10	0	3	0	1	0	3	1	—		17	1
Atlético Mineiro	Total		85	9	34	11	7	4	16	3	—		142	27
Antalyaspor	2015–16	TFF First League	12	1	—		1	1	—		—		13	2
Corinthians	2016	Série A	26	6	11	1	2	0	4	1	—		43	8
Corinthians	2017	Série A	0	0	3	0	1	0	—		—		4	0
Corinthians	Total		26	6	14	1	3	0	4	1	—		47	8
Atlético Paranaense (loan)	2017	Série A	21	5	—		—		1	0	—		22	5
Atlético Paranaense (loan)	2018	Série A	14	2	0	0	7	3	5 (Note: Appearance(s) in Copa Sudamericana)	1	—		26	6
Atlético Paranaense (loan)	Total		35	7	0	0	7	3	6	1	—		48	11
Career total			245	62	63	18	24	12	37	7	0	0	369	99

== Honours ==
Cruzeiro

- Campeonato Mineiro: 2008

Dynamo Kyiv

- Ukrainian Premier League: 2008–09
- Ukrainian Super Cup: 2009

CSKA Moscow

- Russian Cup: 2010–11

Atlético Mineiro

- Campeonato Mineiro: 2012, 2013, 2015
- Copa Libertadores: 2013
- Recopa Sudamericana: 2014
- Copa do Brasil: 2014
