= Nicolas Marazzi =

Swiss footballer (born 1981)

Nicolas Marazzizi
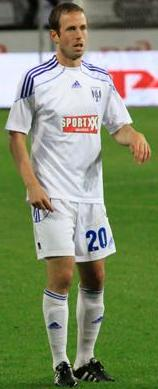

Personal information
- Full name: Nicolas Marazzi
- Date of birth: 13 July 1981 (age 45)
- Place of birth: Switzerland
- Height: 1.77 m (5 ft 10 in)
- Position: Midfielder

Youth career
- Sion

Senior career*
| Years | Team | Apps | (Gls) |
| 1997–2004 | Sion | 123 | (7) |
| 2004–2008 | Yverdon-Sport | 120 | (7) |
| 2008–2013 | Lausanne-Sport | 142 | (11) |
| 2013–2016 | FC Azzurri 90 | 65 | (5) |
| Total | | 450 | (30) |

International career
| | Switzerland U21 | 12 | (1) |
- * Club domestic league appearances and goals

Nicolas Marazzi (born 13 July 1981) is a Swiss former professional footballer who played as a midfielder.

He was signed by Yverdon-Sport FC on 3 August 2004. Later, he moved on to FC Lausanne-Sport on 1 July 2008. At the end of the 2012–13 Swiss Super League season, Marazzi left Lausanne-Sport after his contract was not renewed. He joined newly promoted fourth-tier side FC Azzurri 90 in Lausanne.
