= Aleksandr Kudryavtsev =

Russian footballer

Personal information
- Full name: Aleksandr Valeryevich Kudryavtsev
- Date of birth: 9 June 1990 (age 36)
- Height: 1.70 m (5 ft 7 in)
- Position: Midfielder

Youth career
- FC Shinnik Yaroslavl

Senior career*
Years	Team	Apps	(Gls)
2007–2010	PFC CSKA Moscow	0	(0)
2010	→ FC Shinnik Yaroslavl (loan)	5	(0)
2010	→ FC Tyumen (loan)	9	(0)
2011–2012	FC Gornyak Uchaly	47	(7)
2013	FC Tekstilshchik Ivanovo	11	(2)

International career
2009	Russia U19	7	(2)
- * Club domestic league appearances and goals

Aleksandr Valeryevich Kudryavtsev (Russian: Александр Валерьевич Кудрявцев; born 9 June 1990) is a former Russian professional football player.

== Club career ==
He made his Russian Football National League debut for FC Shinnik Yaroslavl on 18 April 2010 in a game against FC Mordovia Saransk. That was his only season in the FNL.
