= Andrei Vasyanovich =

Russian footballer

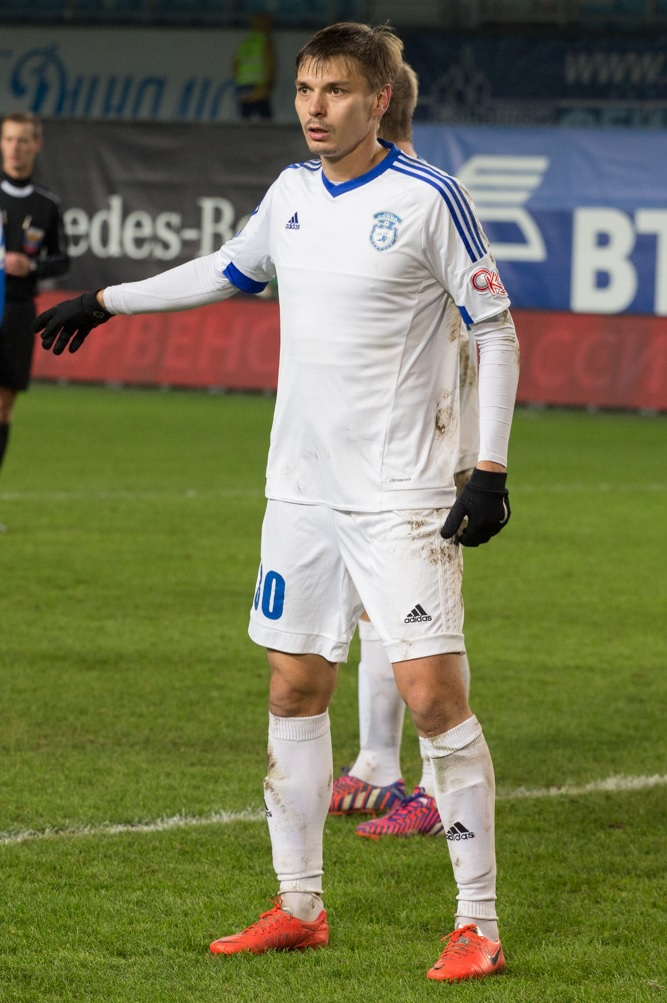
- Vasyanovich with Sokol Saratov in 2016

Personal information
- Full name: Andrei Aleksandrovich Vasyanovich
- Date of birth: 13 June 1988 (age 38)
- Place of birth: Krasnodar, Russian SFSR
- Height: 1.82 m (5 ft 11 1/2 in)
- Position: Defender

Youth career
- FC Krasnodar-2000

Senior career*
Years	Team	Apps	(Gls)
2005–2007	Krasnodar-2000	56	(0)
2008–2010	Moscow	5	(0)
2010–2013	CSKA Moscow	0	(0)
2010	→ Spartak Nalchik (loan)	13	(0)
2011	→ Zhemchuzhina-Sochi (loan)	9	(0)
2012	→ Dynamo Bryansk (loan)	10	(1)
2012–2013	→ Rotor Volgograd (loan)	21	(1)
2013–2014	Rotor Volgograd	9	(1)
2014	Baltika Kaliningrad	10	(0)
2015	Vityaz Krymsk	14	(2)
2015–2016	Neftekhimik Nizhnekamsk	19	(0)
2016–2017	Sokol Saratov	36	(0)
2017–2018	Torpedo Moscow	9	(0)
2024–2025	Lisne	15	(0)

International career
2009	Russia U21	1	(0)
- * Club domestic league appearances and goals

Andrei Aleksandrovich Vasyanovich (Russian: Андрей Александрович Васянович; born 13 June 1988) is a Russian former professional footballer.

== Club career ==
He made his professional debut in the Russian Second Division in 2005 for FC Krasnodar-2000. In 2008 he signed for FC Moscow in the Russian Premier League, In 2010 he moved to PFC CSKA Moscow. In 2011 he was loaned Zhemchuzhina-Sochi where he played 9 matches.

In June 2014, he signed a contract with Baltika Kaliningrad in the Russian First League.

In 2024 he moved to Lisne, where he helped the club to get promoted to the Ukrainian Second League.

== Honours ==
CSKA Moscow

- Russian Premier Leagueː 2012–13
- Russian Cup: 2013
- La Manga Cup: 2013
