= Sergei Chepchugov =

Russian professional footballer

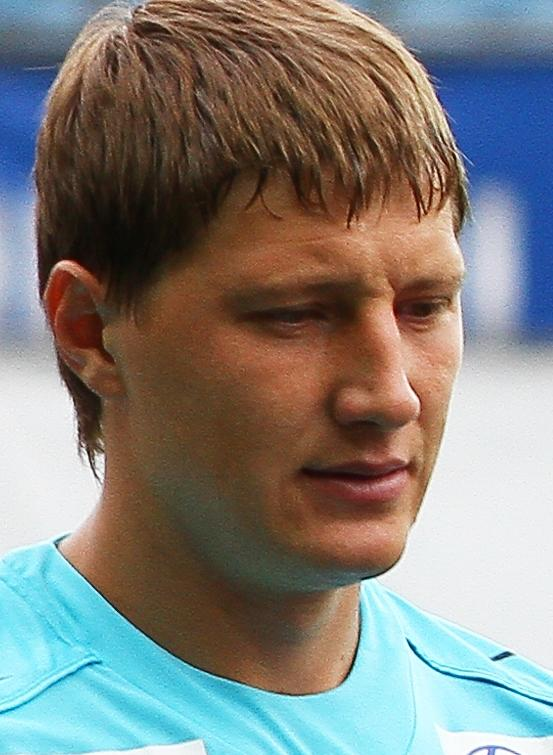
- Chepchugov with CSKA Moscow in 2011

Personal information
- Full name: Sergei Andreyevich Chepchugov
- Date of birth: 15 July 1985 (age 41)
- Place of birth: Krasnoyarsk, Russian SFSR
- Height: 1.86 m (6 ft 1 in)
- Position: Goalkeeper

Senior career*
Years	Team	Apps	(Gls)
2003–2007	FC Metallurg Krasnoyarsk	97	(0)
2006	→ FC Sibiryak Bratsk (loan)	14	(0)
2008	FK Rīga	5	(0)
2008–2009	FC Sibir Novosibirsk	46	(0)
2010–2017	PFC CSKA Moscow	14	(0)
2017	FC Yenisey Krasnoyarsk	6	(0)
2021	FC Yenisey-2 Krasnoyarsk	12	(0)
- * Club domestic league appearances and goals

Sergei Andreyevich Chepchugov (Russian: Сергей Андреевич Чепчугов; born 15 July 1985) is a Russian former professional footballer.

== Career ==
He made his professional debut in the Russian Second Division in 2004 for FC Metallurg Krasnoyarsk. On 23 December 2009 PFC CSKA Moscow have signed the goalkeeper from FC Sibir Novosibirsk until 2011.

== Honours ==
=== Club ===
CSKA

- Russian Premier League (3): 2012–13, 2013–14, 2015–16
- Russian Cup (2): 2010–11, 2012–13
- Russian Super Cup (2): 2013, 2014

=== Individual ===
- Russian First Division best goalkeeper (1): 2009
- Russian Second Division Zone East best goalkeeper (2): 2005, 2007
