= Nika Piliyev =

Russian footballer

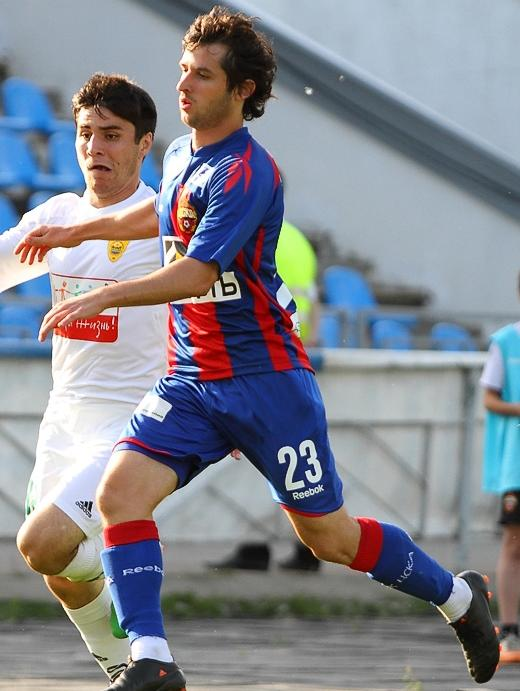

Personal information
- Full name: Nika Konstantinovich Piliyev
- Date of birth: 21 March 1991 (age 35)
- Place of birth: Tbilisi, Georgian SSR
- Height: 1.76 m (5 ft 9 in)
- Position: Midfielder

Youth career
- 2004–2009: Lokomotiv Moscow

Senior career*
Years	Team	Apps	(Gls)
2009	Lokomotiv Moscow	1	(0)
2009–2013	CSKA Moscow	4	(0)
2010	→ Amkar Perm (loan)	5	(0)
2012	→ Slovan Bratislava (loan)	4	(1)
2013	→ Volgar Astrakhan (loan)	10	(0)
2013	Dila Gori	7	(0)
2014–2015	Banants	7	(0)
2015	Ulisses	12	(0)
2015	Torpedo Armavir	6	(0)
2016	RFS	21	(0)
2017	Domodedovo Moscow	10	(0)
2017–2018	Volgar Astrakhan	12	(0)
2018	Spartak Vladikavkaz	15	(0)
2019–2020	Kuban-Holding Pavlovskaya (amateur)		
2020–2022	Kuban-Holding Pavlovskaya	46	(3)

International career
2009–2010	Russia U19	8	(3)
2011–2012	Russia U20	9	(2)
2012	Russia U21	0	(0)
- * Club domestic league appearances and goals

Nika Konstantinovich Piliyev (Russian: Ника Константинович Пилиев; born 21 March 1991) is a Russian former professional footballer.

== Career ==
Piliyev made his debut in the Russian Premier League on 16 May 2009 for Lokomotiv Moscow in a game against Terek Grozny.

== Career statistics ==
Club	Season	League			Cup		Continental		Total	
Club	Season	Division	Apps	Goals	Apps	Goals	Apps	Goals	Apps	Goals
Lokomotiv Moscow	2009	Russian Premier League	1	0	0	0	–		1	0
CSKA Moscow	2009	Russian Premier League	4	0	–		3 (Note: Appearances in the UEFA Champions League)	0	7	0
CSKA Moscow	2010	Russian Premier League	0	0	0	0	–		0	0
CSKA Moscow	2011–12	Russian Premier League	0	0	0	0	0	0	0	0
CSKA Moscow	Total		4	0	0	0	3	0	7	0
Amkar Perm (loan)	2010	Russian Premier League	5	0	–		–		5	0
Slovan Bratislava (loan)	2011–12	Slovak First Football League	4	1	2	0	–		6	1
Volgar Astrakhan (loan)	2012–13	Russian First League	10	0	–		–		10	0
Volgar Astrakhan (loan)	2013–14	Russian Second League	0	0	0	0	–		0	0
Volgar Astrakhan (loan)	Total		10	0	0	0	0	0	10	0
Dila Gori	2013–14	Erovnuli Liga	7	0	0	0	0	0	7	0
Banants	2014–15	Armenian Premier League	7	0	0	0	0	0	7	0
Ulisses	2014–15	Armenian Premier League	12	0	–		–		12	0
Ulisses	2015–16	Armenian Premier League	–		–		2 (Note: Appearances in the UEFA Europa League)	0	2	0
Ulisses	Total		12	0	0	0	2	0	14	0
Torpedo Armavir	2015–16	Russian First League	6	0	0	0	–		6	0
RFS	2016	Latvian Higher League	21	0	1	1	–		22	1
Domodedovo Moscow	2016–17	Russian Second League	10	0	–		–		10	0
Volgar Astrakhan	2017–18	Russian First League	12	0	2	0	–		14	0
Spartak Vladikavkaz	2018–19	Russian Second League	15	0	2	0	–		17	0
Kuban-Holding Pavlovskaya	2019–20	Russian Amateur Football League	–		2	0	–		2	0
Kuban-Holding Pavlovskaya	2020–21	Russian Second League	23	2	3	0	–		26	2
Kuban-Holding Pavlovskaya	2021–22	Russian Second League	23	1	1	0	–		24	1
Kuban-Holding Pavlovskaya	Total		46	3	6	0	0	0	52	3
Career total			160	4	13	1	5	0	178	5
