= Anton Vlasov =

Russian footballer

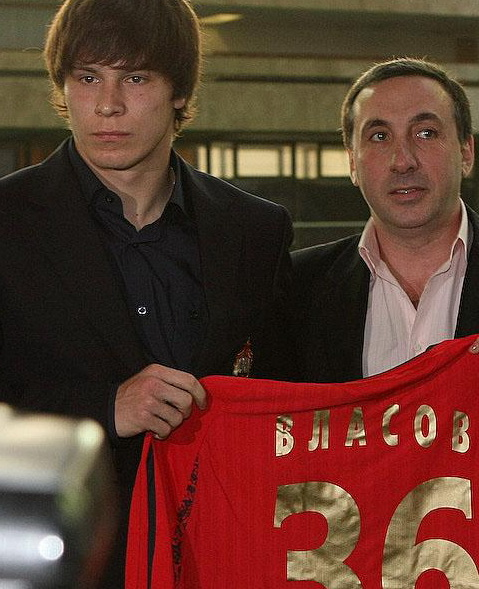

Personal information
- Date of birth: 11 May 1989 (age 37)
- Place of birth: Ust-Labinsk, Russian SFSR
- Height: 1.88 m (6 ft 2 in)
- Position: Defender

Youth career
- Kuban Krasnodar
- Konoplyov football academy
- FC Lokomotiv Moscow

Senior career*
Years	Team	Apps	(Gls)
2006–2007	Krylia Sovetov-SOK	25	(1)
2008–2012	CSKA Moscow	0	(0)
2009	→ Anzhi Makhachkala (loan)	5	(0)
2010	→ Volga Nizhny Novgorod (loan)	2	(0)
2010	→ Khimik Dzerzhinsk (loan)	7	(0)
2011	→ Gazovik Orenburg (loan)	0	(0)
2012–2013	FC Taganrog	11	(0)
2013–2014	FC SKVO Rostov-on-Don	17	(0)
2015	FC Kuban Ust-Labinsk		
2017–2018	FC Omega Kurganinsk		
2018	FC Agrokompleks Vyselki		

International career
2005–2006	Russia U-17	8	(0)
2009	Russia U-21	8	(0)
- * Club domestic league appearances and goals

Anton Vasilyevich Vlasov (Russian: Антон Васильевич Власов, born 11 May 1989) is a Russian former football defender.

== Club career ==
He made his Russian Football National League debut for FC Anzhi Makhachkala on 28 August 2009 in a game against FC Krasnodar. He played one more season in the FNL for FC Volga Nizhny Novgorod.

== International career ==
Vlasov was one of the members of the Russian U-17 squad that won the 2006 UEFA U-17 Championship. He is a part of the Russia U-21 side that is competing in the 2011 European Under-21 Championship qualification.
