= Leonid Rodionov =

Russian footballer

Personal information
- Full name: Leonid Yuryevich Rodionov
- Date of birth: 12 January 1993 (age 33)
- Place of birth: Moscow, Russia
- Height: 1.70 m (5 ft 7 in)
- Position: Midfielder

Youth career
- –2006: Yaroslavl
- 2006–2009: PFC CSKA Moscow

Senior career*
Years	Team	Apps	(Gls)
2010–2012	PFC CSKA Moscow	0	(0)
2013–2016	FC Shinnik Yaroslavl	36	(0)
2016	FC Oryol	12	(0)

International career
2010	Russia U17	8	(1)
2011	Russia U18	6	(0)
2012	Russia U19	1	(0)
- * Club domestic league appearances and goals

Leonid Yuryevich Rodionov (Russian: Леонид Юрьевич Родионов; born 12 January 1993) is a former Russian football midfielder.

== Club career ==
He made his debut in the Russian Football National League for FC Shinnik Yaroslavl on 12 March 2013 in a game against FC Salyut Belgorod.
