= Maksim Fyodorov (footballer, born 1989) =

Russian footballer

Personal information
- Full name: Maksim Andreyevich Fyodorov
- Date of birth: 5 April 1989 (age 37)
- Place of birth: Rasskazovo, USSR
- Height: 1.80 m (5 ft 11 in)
- Position: Midfielder

Youth career
- –2003: FShM Dimitrovgrad
- 2004–2006: Konoplyov football academy

Senior career*
Years	Team	Apps	(Gls)
2006–2007	FC Krylia Sovetov-SOK Dimitrovgrad	50	(11)
2008	FC Togliatti	26	(9)
2009–2010	PFC CSKA Moscow	0	(0)
2010	→ FC Akademiya Togliatti (loan)	11	(0)
2010	→ FC Dynamo Bryansk (loan)	7	(0)
2018	FC Lada-Togliatti	4	(0)
- * Club domestic league appearances and goals

Maksim Andreyevich Fyodorov (Russian: Максим Андреевич Фёдоров; born 5 April 1989) is a Russian former professional footballer.

== Career ==
He made his professional debut in the Russian Second Division in 2006 for FC Krylia Sovetov-SOK Dimitrovgrad.

He played in the Russian Football National League for FC Dynamo Bryansk in 2010.
