= Yuri Ryzhov (footballer) =

Soviet and Russian footballer

- Yuri Ryzhov in 1973

Personal information
- Full name: Yuri Alekseevich Ryzhov
- Date of birth: 13 March 1952
- Place of birth: Kaluga, Russian SFSR, USSR
- Date of death: 29 June 2015 (aged 63)
- Place of death: Kaluga, Russia
- Height: 1.82 m (5 ft 11 1/2 in)
- Position: Second striker

Team information
- Current team: Ended his career

Youth career
- Zarya (Kaluga)

Senior career*
Years	Team	Apps	(Gls)
1971–1972	FC Lokomotiv Kaluga		
1973–1975	FC Lokomotiv Moscow	66	(12)
1975	Druzhba (Yoshkar-Ola)	21	(1)
1976	FC Lokomotiv Kaluga	40	(15)
1977–1981	FC Kuzbass Kemerovo	201	(49)
1982	FC Metallurg Novokuznetsk	25	(14)
- * Club domestic league appearances and goals as of 13 December 2014

Yuri Alekseevich Ryzhov (Russian: Юрий Алексеевич Рыжов; 1952 – 2015) was a Soviet football player. Master of Sports of the USSR.

== Career ==
In his youth, Ryzhov started his career in Youth FC Zarya Kaluga. He later started playing in FC Lokomotiv Kaluga; and soon moved to the Moscow team railroad, within which in 1974 won the first league tournament, and in 1975 spent 7 matches and scored 1 goal in the premier league of the USSR; also European Railways Cup (1974). Spent five seasons in the Kemerovo of FC Kuzbass, serving first league (played in the attack, along with Vitaly Razdayev (top scorer of the first league USSR Cup in history); in the championship-1977, one of the two most successful club to Kemerovo, scored 14 goals); also played for the team in the second league.

Yuri Ryzhov died on 29 June 2015 in Kaluga.

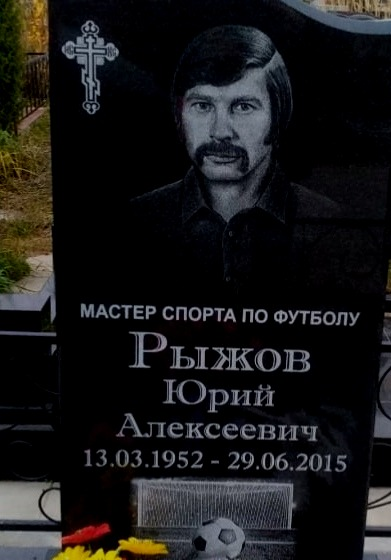
Yuri Ryzhov's grave in Kaluga
