= Vladimir Kazmenko =

Russian football referee

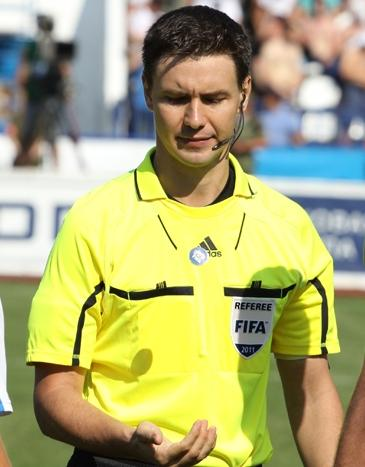
- Vladimir Kazmenko in 2011
- Full name: Vladimir Aleksandrovich Kazmenko
- Born: 27 September 1975 (age 51); Rostov-on-Don, Soviet Union

Domestic
| Years | League | Role |
| 2009– | Russian Premier League | Referee |

International
| Years | League | Role |
| 2011–2014 | FIFA listed | Referee |

Vladimir Aleksandrovich Kazmenko (Russian: Владимир Александрович Казьменко); born September 27, 1975, in Rostov-on-Don is a Russian professional football referee. He has officiated matches of the Russian Premier League since 2009 and was given charge of the 2010 Russian Cup Final.

Kazmenko became a FIFA referee in 2011. He was removed from the FIFA list in 2014.
