= Vyacheslav Isupov =

Russian footballer

Personal information
- Full name: Vyacheslav Alekseyevich Isupov
- Date of birth: 16 January 1993 (age 33)
- Place of birth: Izhevsk, Russia
- Height: 1.90 m (6 ft 3 in)
- Position: Goalkeeper

Senior career*
Years	Team	Apps	(Gls)
2010–2014	PFC CSKA Moscow	0	(0)
2013–2014	→ FC Lokomotiv-2 Moscow (loan)	20	(0)
2015–2016	FC Vityaz Podolsk	32	(0)
2016–2019	FC Khimki	72	(0)
2019–2022	FC Neftekhimik Nizhnekamsk	20	(0)

International career
2008–2009	Russia U-16	9	(0)
2009–2010	Russia U-17	3	(0)
2010–2011	Russia U-18	8	(0)
2011	Russia U-19	6	(0)
2012–2014	Russia U-21	3	(0)
- * Club domestic league appearances and goals

Vyacheslav Alekseyevich Isupov (Russian: Вячеслав Алексеевич Исупов; born 16 January 1993) is a Russian former football goalkeeper.

== Club career ==
He made his debut in the Russian Second Division for FC Lokomotiv-2 Moscow on 15 July 2013 in a game against FC Khimki.

He made his Russian Football National League debut for FC Khimki on 31 July 2016 in a game against FC Sibir Novosibirsk.
