= Semyon Fedotov =

Russian professional football player

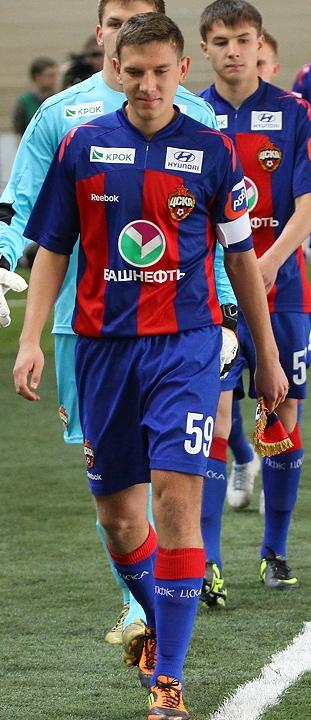
- Fedotov with CSKA in 2012

Personal information
- Full name: Semyon Aleksandrovich Fedotov
- Date of birth: 2 March 1992 (age 34)
- Place of birth: Vladimir, Russia
- Height: 1.79 m (5 ft 10 in)
- Positions: Defensive midfielder; right back

Senior career*
Years	Team	Apps	(Gls)
2009–2013	PFC CSKA Moscow	2	(0)
2013	→ FC Lokomotiv-2 Moscow (loan)	9	(1)
2013–2014	FC Lokomotiv-2 Moscow	25	(0)
2014–2015	FC Khimik Dzerzhinsk	26	(0)
2015–2016	FC KAMAZ Naberezhnye Chelny	22	(1)
2016–2017	FC Dynamo Saint Petersburg	11	(0)
2017	Sillamäe Kalev	15	(1)
2018	FC Torpedo Vladimir	8	(0)
2018–2019	FC KAMAZ Naberezhnye Chelny	21	(1)
2019	FC SKA Rostov-on-Don	12	(2)
2020–2021	Kohtla-Järve JK Järve	5	(0)
2021	Sillamäe Kalev	0	(0)

International career
2008–2009	Russia U-17	12	(2)
2010	Russia U-18	6	(0)
2011	Russia U-19	9	(0)
2011	Russia U-21	1	(0)
- * Club domestic league appearances and goals

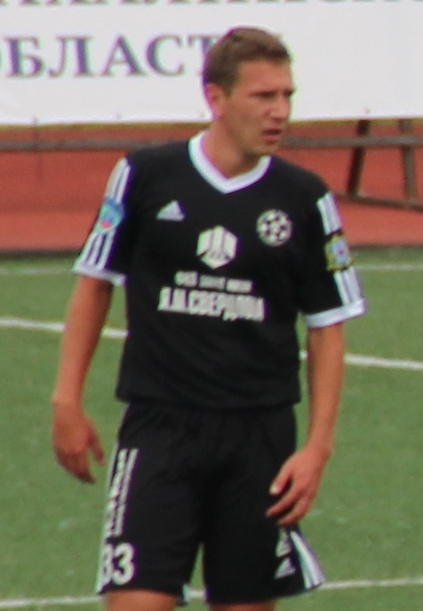
Semyon Fedotov in 2014

Semyon Aleksandrovich Fedotov (Russian: Семён Александрович Федотов; born 2 March 1992) is a Russian former professional football player.

== Club career ==
He made his professional debut for PFC CSKA Moscow on 15 December 2010 in a 2010–11 UEFA Europa League game against AC Sparta Prague. He made his Russian Premier League debut for CSKA on 15 October 2011 in a game against FC Terek Grozny.
