= Gela Zaseyev =

Russian footballer

Personal information
- Full name: Gela Dzhambulatovich Zaseyev
- Date of birth: 20 January 1993 (age 33)
- Place of birth: Moscow Oblast, Russia
- Height: 1.83 m (6 ft 0 in)
- Position: Midfielder

Youth career
- –2005: FC Lokomotiv Moscow
- 2005–2010: PFC CSKA Moscow

Senior career*
Years	Team	Apps	(Gls)
2010–2013	PFC CSKA Moscow	0	(0)
2013	FC Alania Vladikavkaz	5	(0)
2014	FC Strogino Moscow	9	(2)
2016	FC Domodedovo Moscow	9	(0)
2016	FC Baltika Kaliningrad	1	(0)
2019	FC Strogino Moscow	4	(0)
2020–2021	FC Khimki	1	(0)
2020–2021	→ FC Khimki-M	17	(0)

International career
2010	Russia U-18	3	(0)
2014	Russia U-21	2	(0)
- * Club domestic league appearances and goals

Gela Dzhambulatovich Zaseyev (Russian: Гела Джамбулатович Засеев; born 20 January 1993) is a Russian former football midfielder.

== Club career ==
In July 2013 Zaseyev left CSKA Moscow to sign a permanent contract with Alania Vladikavkaz. He made his debut in the Russian Football National League for FC Alania Vladikavkaz on 18 August 2013 in a game against FC Rotor Volgograd.

He made his Russian Premier League debut for FC Khimki on 25 August 2020 in a game against FC Arsenal Tula.
