= Dmitri Ryzhov =

Russian footballer

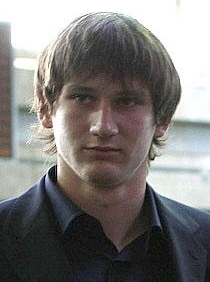
- Dmitry Ryzhov in 2008

Personal information
- Full name: Dmitri Aleksandrovich Ryzhov
- Date of birth: 26 August 1989 (age 37)
- Place of birth: Togliatti, USSR
- Height: 1.88 m (6 ft 2 in)
- Position: Forward

Youth career
- –2002: Lada Togliatti
- 2003–2006: Konoplyov football academy

Senior career*
Years	Team	Apps	(Gls)
2006–2007	Krylia Sovetov-SOK Dimitrovgrad	45	(18)
2007–2012	CSKA Moscow	10	(0)
2009	→ Alania Vladikavkaz (loan)	12	(2)
2010	→ Ural Sverdlovsk Oblast (loan)	0	(0)
2011	→ Mordovia Saransk (loan)	23	(2)
2012	Khimki	10	(1)
2012–2013	Ural Sverdlovsk Oblast	7	(1)
2013–2015	Yenisey Krasnoyarsk	37	(6)
2015–2016	Torpedo Armavir	15	(0)
2016	Lada-Togliatti	6	(0)
2017	Ararat Moscow	9	(1)
2018	Lada-Togliatti	2	(0)
2018	Akron Tolyatti (amateur)		
2019–2020	Ararat Yerevan	10	(1)

International career
2005–2006	Russia U-17	11	(0)
2009	Russia U-21	4	(3)
- * Club domestic league appearances and goals

Dmitri Aleksandrovich Ryzhov (Russian: Дмитрий Александрович Рыжов, born 26 August 1989) is a Russian former football player.

== Career ==
He played the 2009 season for FC Alania Vladikavkaz on loan from PFC CSKA Moscow. On 2 February 2010 the 20-year-old striker yielded on loan for one year to FC Ural Sverdlovsk Oblast, the footballer arrived in Moscow in January 2008 from FC Krylya Sovetov-SOK and has played in the first team in this same season, together with Alan Dzagoev.

== Honours ==
- Russian Second Division Zone Ural/Povolzhye top scorer: 2007 (17 goals).
- Russian Cup: 2009

== International career ==
Ryzhov was one of the members of the Russian U-17 squad that won the 2006 UEFA U-17 Championship. He is a part of the Russia U-21 side that is competing in the 2011 European Under-21 Championship qualification.
