= 2010 FC Krasnodar season =

FC Krasnodar
2010 season
- Chairman: Sergey Galitsky
- Manager: Sergei Tashuyev
- Stadium: Kuban Stadium
- Russian First Division: 5th
- Russian Cup: Progressed to 2011–12 season
- Top goalscorer: League: Yevgeni Kaleshin (11); All: Yevgeni Kaleshin (11)
Home colours	Away colours

The 2010 FC Krasnodar season was the club's third season and their second season in the Russian First Division. They finished the season in fifth place, and earned promotion to the Russian Premier League, the highest tier of association football in Russia, after FC Saturn withdrew from the Premier League.

== Squad ==
As of match played 6 November 2010

Number	Name	Nationality	Position	Date of birth (Age (Note: Age as of the end of the season))	Signed from	Signed in	Contract ends	Apps.	Goals
Goalkeepers
1	Aleksei Botvinyev	(Russia)	GK	25 June 1981 (aged 29)	loan from Saturn	2010		18	0
16	Denis Pchelintsev	(Russia)	GK	1 December 1979 (aged 30)	Nosta Novotroitsk	2009			
30	Aleksandr Perov	(Russia)	GK	9 July 1978 (aged 32)	Mashuk-KMV	2009			
Defenders
2	Nikolay Markov	(Uzbekistan)	DF	20 April 1985 (aged 25)	Salyut Belgorod	2010		32	0
4	Alyaksandr Martynovich	(Belarus)	DF	26 August 1987 (aged 23)	Dinamo Minsk	2010		15	0
5	Yevgeni Kaleshin	(Russia)	DF	20 June 1978 (aged 32)	Alania Vladikavkaz	2009			
6	Sergei Tsukanov	(Russia)	DF	14 January 1986 (aged 24)	Sportakademklub Moscow	2009			
15	Yegor Tarakanov	(Russia)	DF	17 April 1987 (aged 23)	Volga Nizhny Novgorod	2010		7	0
17	Mikhail Bagayev	(Russia)	DF	28 February 1985 (aged 25)	SKA-Energiya Khabarovsk	2009			
24	Sergei Miroshnichenko	(Russia)	DF	18 July 1982 (aged 28)	Ural Sverdlovsk Oblast	2009			
28	Ivan Novović	(Montenegro)	DF	26 April 1989 (aged 21)	Zeta	2010		1	0
Midfielders
3	Vladimir Leshonok	(Russia)	MF	14 August 1984 (aged 26)	Salyut Belgorod	2010		12	1
7	Andrei Pazin	(Russia)	MF	20 January 1986 (aged 24)	Nosta Novotroitsk	2010		39	6
8	Aleksandr Oleinik	(Russia)	MF	1 January 1982 (aged 28)	Nosta Novotroitsk	2010		32	0
14	Vladimir Tatarchuk	(Russia)	MF	20 September 1987 (aged 23)	CSKA Moscow	2008			
18	Azim Fatullayev	(Russia)	MF	7 June 1986 (aged 24)	Sudostroitel Astrakhan	2008			
20	Artyom Beketov	(Russia)	MF	12 June 1984 (aged 26)	Salyut Belgorod	2010		0	0
21	Mikhail Komkov	(Russia)	MF	1 October 1984 (aged 26)	KAMAZ	2010		31	8
22	Roman Surnev	(Russia)	MF	1 June 1981 (aged 29)	Salyut Belgorod	2009			
23	Andrei Mikheyev	(Russia)	MF	1 July 1987 (aged 23)	Taganrog	2009			
25	Yevgeni Shipitsin	(Russia)	MF	16 January 1985 (aged 25)	Salyut Belgorod	2010		15	0
27	Denys Dedechko	(Ukraine)	MF	2 July 1987 (aged 23)	Amkar Perm	2010		18	3
Forwards
9	Igor Picușceac	(Moldova)	FW	27 March 1983 (aged 27)	Sheriff Tiraspol	2009			
10	Aleksandr Yarkin	(Russia)	FW	29 December 1986 (aged 23)	Rubin Kazan	2010		25	5
11	Spartak Gogniyev	(Russia)	FW	19 January 1981 (aged 29)	KAMAZ	2010		18	5
26	Ivan Knežević	(Montenegro)	FW	22 February 1986 (aged 24)	Zeta	2010		17	1
Away on loan
11	Denis Dorozhkin	(Russia)	FW	8 June 1987 (aged 23)	Academy	2008			
13	Aleksey Arkhipov	(Russia)	MF	24 March 1983 (aged 27)	Vityaz Podolsk	2010		1	0
19	Nikita Zhdankin	(Russia)	MF	13 October 1989 (aged 21)	Chelyabinsk	2010		2	0
Players who left during the season
3	Aleksandr Kulikov	(Russia)	DF	19 March 1988 (aged 22)	loan from Rubin Kazan	2010		14	0
4	Aleksei Bugayev	(Russia)	DF	25 August 1981 (aged 29)	Khimki	2010			
25	Anatoli Romanovich	(Russia)	DF	9 September 1979 (aged 31)	MVD Rossii Moscow	2009			
27	Aleksandar Mladenov	(Bulgaria)	MF	25 June 1982 (aged 28)	Slavia Sofia	2010		4	0
33	Maksim Demenko	(Russia)	MF	21 March 1976 (aged 34)	Dynamo Krasnodar	2010			

== Transfers ==
=== Winter ===
In: Note: Flags indicate national team as defined under FIFA eligibility rules; some limited exceptions apply. Players may hold more than one non-FIFA nationality.

No.	Pos.	Nation	Player
1	GK	RUS	Aleksei Botvinyev (loan from (Russia) Saturn)
2	DF	UZB	Nikolay Markov (from (Russia) Salyut Belgorod)
3	DF	RUS	Aleksandr Kulikov (loan from (Russia) Rubin Kazan)
7	MF	RUS	Andrei Pazin (from (Russia) Nosta Novotroitsk)
10	FW	RUS	Aleksandr Yarkin (from (Russia) Rubin Kazan)
13	MF	RUS	Aleksei Arkhipov (from (Russia) Vityaz Podolsk)
15	DF	RUS	Yegor Tarakanov (from (Russia) FC Volga)
19	MF	RUS	Nikita Zhdankin (from (Russia) Chelyabinsk)
20	MF	RUS	Artyom Beketov (from (Russia) Salyut Belgorod)
21	MF	RUS	Mikhail Komkov (from (Russia) KAMAZ)
26	FW	MNE	Ivan Knežević (from (Montenegro) FK Zeta)
27	MF	BUL	Aleksandar Mladenov (from (Bulgaria) Slavia Sofia)

Out: Note: Flags indicate national team as defined under FIFA eligibility rules; some limited exceptions apply. Players may hold more than one non-FIFA nationality.

No.	Pos.	Nation	Player
7	MF	RUS	Dmitry Loshkaryov (to (Russia) Sportakademklub)
8	FW	RUS	Vitali Balamestny (to (Azerbaijan) Standard Baku)
9	MF	RUS	Almir Mukhutdinov (to (Russia) Gazovik Orenburg)
10	MF	RUS	Yuri Dubrovin (to (Russia) Tyumen)
13	DF	UKR	Ihor Dudnyk (to (Latvia) Daugava)
17	DF	RUS	Maxim Usanov (to (Canada) Toronto)
19	MF	RUS	Lyubomir Kantonistov (to (Russia) Dynamo St.Petersburg)
22	GK	RUS	Nikolay Moskalenko (loan to (Russia) Druzhba Maykop)
29	MF	RUS	Andrei Shreyner
31	GK	RUS	Anton Alekseyev
—	MF	RUS	Vyacheslav Semashkin (to (Russia) Zelenograd, previously on loan)
—	MF	BIH	Ricardo Baiano (to (Russia) Zhemchuzhina-Sochi, previously on loan at (Russia) Spartak Nalchik)

=== Summer ===
In: Note: Flags indicate national team as defined under FIFA eligibility rules; some limited exceptions apply. Players may hold more than one non-FIFA nationality.

No.	Pos.	Nation	Player
3	MF	RUS	Vladimir Leshonok (from (Russia) Salyut)
4	DF	BLR	Alyaksandr Martynovich (from (Belarus) Dinamo Minsk)
11	FW	RUS	Spartak Gogniyev (from (Russia) KAMAZ)
25	MF	RUS	Yevgeni Shipitsin (from (Russia) Salyut)
27	MF	UKR	Denys Dedechko (from (Russia) Amkar Perm)
28	DF	MNE	Ivan Novović (from (Montenegro) Zeta)

Out: Note: Flags indicate national team as defined under FIFA eligibility rules; some limited exceptions apply. Players may hold more than one non-FIFA nationality.

No.	Pos.	Nation	Player
3	DF	RUS	Aleksandr Kulikov (loan return to (Russia) Rubin Kazan)
4	MF	RUS	Aleksei Bugayev
11	FW	RUS	Denis Dorozhkin (loan to (Russia) Rotor Volgograd)
13	MF	RUS	Aleksei Arkhipov (loan to (Russia) Shinnik)
19	FW	RUS	Nikita Zhdankin (loan to (Russia) Gazovik Orenburg)
25	DF	RUS	Anatoli Romanovich (to (Russia) Baltika Kaliningrad)
27	MF	BUL	Alexandar Mladenov (to (Bulgaria) Kaliakra Kavarna)
33	MF	RUS	Maksim Demenko (to (Russia) Zhemchuzhina-Sochi)
—	FW	RUS	Anatoly Shevchenko (to (Russia) Torpedo Armavir)

== Competitions ==
=== Overview ===
Competition	First match	Last match	Starting round	Final position	Record							
Competition	First match	Last match	Starting round	Final position	Pld	W	D	L	GF	GA	GD	Win %
First Division	27 March 2010	6 November 2010	Matchday 1	5th	38	17	10	11	60	44	+16	44.74
Russian Cup	1 July 2010	14 July 2010	Fifth Round	Round of 32	2	2	0	0	3	1	+2	100.00
Total					40	19	10	11	63	45	+18	47.50

Last updated: 6 November 2010
Source: See Results

=== First Division ===
==== League table ====
Pos	Team	Pld	W	D	L	GF	GA	GD	Pts	Promotion or relegation
3	Nizhny Novgorod	38	21	7	10	60	41	+19	70	
4	KAMAZ Naberezhnye Chelny	38	19	9	10	55	43	+12	66	
5	Krasnodar (P)	38	17	10	11	60	44	+16	61	Promotion to Premier League
6	Mordovia Saransk	38	16	10	12	53	40	+13	58	
7	Ural Sverdlovsk Oblast	38	14	16	8	38	28	+10	58	

Source: PFL, Soccerway
Rules for classification: 1st points; 2nd matches won; 3rd head-to-head (points, matches won, goal difference, goals scored, away goals scored); 4th goal difference; 5th goals scored; 6th away goals scored
(P) Promoted

==== Results summary ====
Overall								Home						Away					
Pld	W	D	L	GF	GA	GD	Pts	W	D	L	GF	GA	GD	W	D	L	GF	GA	GD
38	17	10	11	60	44	+16	61	13	5	1	42	14	+28	4	5	10	18	30	−12

Last updated: 6 November 2010.
Source: See Results

==== Results by round ====
Round	1	2	3	4	5	6	7	8	9	10	11	12	13	14	15	16	17	18	19	20	21	22	23	24	25	26	27	28	29	30	31	32	33	34	35	36	37	38
Ground	A	A	H	H	A	A	A	H	H	A	A	H	H	A	A	H	H	A	A	H	H	A	A	H	H	H	A	A	H	H	A	A	H	H	A	A	H	H
Result	D	D	W	W	L	L	W	W	W	W	W	W	W	L	D	D	W	D	L	D	W	L	L	D	W	W	W	L	D	W	D	L	L	D	L	L	W	W

Updated to match(es) played on 6 November 2010. Source: See Results
A = Away; H = Home; W = Win; D = Draw; L = Loss

==== Results ====
27 March 2010 1	Dynamo St.Petersburg	0 – 0	Krasnodar	Saint Petersburg
17:00 MSK (UTC+4)		Report		Stadium: Minor Sport Arena; Attendance: 2,000; Referee: Almir Kayumov

30 March 2010 2	Baltika Kaliningrad	1 – 1	Krasnodar	Kaliningrad
20:00 MSK (UTC+4)	Reznikov (yellow card) 40'; Rogochiy (yellow card) 31' (yellow-red card) 49'; Krendelew 81'	Report	Dorozhkin (yellow card) 17'; Kaleshin 50' (pen.); Bugayev (yellow card) 83'	Stadium: Baltika Stadium; Attendance: 9,200; Referee: Denis Mareev

7 April 2010 3	Krasnodar	5 – 1	Dynamo Bryansk	Krasnodar
19:00 MSK (UTC+4)	Pazin 5'; Demenko 8', 78'; Mikheyev 28'; Mikheyev 35'; Romanovich (yellow card) 90'	Report	Jincharadze (yellow card) 22'; Shelyutov 55'; Pravilo (yellow card) 69'; Morozov (yellow card) 90'	Stadium: Kuban Stadium; Attendance: 5,000; Referee: Vladimir Kazmenko

10 April 2010 4	Krasnodar	2 – 1	Shinnik Yaroslavl	Krasnodar
17:00 MSK (UTC+4)	Markov (yellow card) 2'; Mikheyev (yellow card) 66'; Demenko 72'; Knežević 74'; Komkov (yellow card) 90'	Report	Vještica 29' (pen.); Voydel (yellow card) 42'; Biletskyi (yellow card) 45'; Arkhipov (red card) 51'; Povorov (yellow card) 68'; Grigoryan (yellow card) 88'	Stadium: Kuban Stadium; Attendance: 6,000; Referee: Alexey Nikolaev

21 April 2010 5	Zhemchuzhina-Sochi	2 – 0	Krasnodar	Sochi
18:30 MSK (UTC+4)	Rukhaia 12'; Ridel (yellow card) 34'; Dubrovin 58'; Zebelyan (yellow card) 65'; Osipov (yellow card) 75'; Fiyev (yellow card) 90'	Report	Oleinik (yellow card) 33'; Markov (yellow card) 65'	Stadium: Sochi Central Stadium; Attendance: 6,500; Referee: Vyacheslav Kharlamov

29 April 2010 6	Nizhny Novgorod	4 – 3	Krasnodar	Nizhny Novgorod
17:00 MSK (UTC+4)	Akopyants 23'; Salnikov 28'; Berkhamov 47'; Tikhonovetsky 66'; Gavryuk (yellow card) 83'	Report	Mikheyev (yellow card) 15' (goal) 58'; Demenko 35', 75' (yellow card) 81'	Stadium: North Stadium; Attendance: 2,200; Referee: Dmitry Popov

2 May 2010 7	Mordovia Saransk	1 – 2	Krasnodar	Saransk
18:00 MSK (UTC+4)	Sysuyev 24'; Dorokhin (yellow card) 28'; Kuleshov (yellow card) 49'	Report	Komkov 20' (yellow card) 44'; Fatullayev 45' (yellow card) 76'; Markov (yellow card) 78'; Yarkin 90'	Stadium: Start Stadium; Attendance: 5,000; Referee: Mikhail Belov

10 May 2010 8	Krasnodar	3 – 0	Rotor Volgograd	Krasnodar
19:00 MSK (UTC+4)	Miroshnichenko 15'; Demenko (yellow card) 50'; Yarkin 55'; Kaleshin 64' (pen.)	Report	Shestakov (yellow card) 34'; Yepifanov (yellow card) 81'	Stadium: Kuban Stadium; Attendance: 7,800; Referee: Mikhail Vilkov

13 May 2010 9	Krasnodar	2 – 0	Volgar-Gazprom Astrakhan	Krasnodar
19:00 MSK (UTC+4)	Kaleshin 26' (pen.) (yellow card) 71'; Surnev (yellow card) 39'; Yarkin 43'; Mikheyev (yellow card) 65'	Report	Marushchak (yellow card) 25'; Volkov (yellow card) 28' (yellow-red card) 31'; Varziyev (yellow card) 38'; Sidyayev (yellow card) 46'; Yatchenko (yellow card) 61'; Loktionov (yellow card) 65'	Stadium: Kuban Stadium; Attendance: 7,500; Referee: Sergey Kuznetsov

21 May 2010 10	Avangard Kursk	1 – 2	Krasnodar	Kursk
18:30 MSK (UTC+4)	Kondakov (yellow card) 42'; Nekrasov (yellow card) 45'; Zobnin 85'; Chizhov (yellow card) 87'; Kireyev (yellow card) 90'	Report	Surnev 21'; Dorozhkin 52'; Knežević (yellow card) 87'	Stadium: Trudovye Rezervy Stadium; Attendance: 5,800; Referee: Vladislav Bezborodov

24 May 2010 11	Salyut Belgorod	1 – 2	Krasnodar	Belgorod
18:30 MSK (UTC+4)	Rodenkov 16'; Leshonok (yellow card) 39'; Zhirny (yellow card) 65'; Korobkin (yellow card) 83'	Report	Demenko (yellow card) 12'; Mikheyev (yellow card) 68' Yarkin 76'; Pazin 84' (yellow card) 88'; Markov (yellow card) 90'	Stadium: Salyut Stadium; Attendance: 8,000; Referee: Vyachelsav Popov

1 June 2010 12	Krasnodar	3 – 0	Luch-Energiya	Krasnodar
20:00 MSK (UTC+4)	Yarkin 9'; Miroshnichenko (yellow card) 23'; Demenko (yellow card) 50'; Kaleshin 51' (pen.), 61' (pen.) (yellow card) 66'; Surnev (yellow card) 74'	Report	Dubensky (yellow card) 27'; Dantsev (yellow card) 37'; Kotlyarov (red card) 54'; Kazantsev (yellow card) 57'	Stadium: Kuban Stadium; Attendance: 6,700; Referee: Eduard Malyi

4 June 2010 13	Krasnodar	3 – 0	SKA-Energiya Khabarovsk	Krasnodar
20:00 MSK (UTC+4)	Fatullayev (yellow card) 6'; Komkov 10'; Yarkin 16'; Kaleshin 31' (pen.); Miroshnichenko (yellow card) 77'	Report	Karmazinenko (yellow card) 67'	Stadium: Kuban Stadium; Attendance: 10,000; Referee: Vitaly Meshkov

12 June 2010 14	Kuban Krasnodar	3 – 0	Krasnodar	Krasnodar
20:00 MSK (UTC+4)	Kulik 16'; Grigoryev (yellow card) 30'; Bucur 77', 84'; Zhilyayev (yellow card) 82'	Report	Mikheyev (yellow card) 48'; Komkov (yellow card) 52'	Stadium: Kuban Stadium; Attendance: 17,500; Referee: Evgeny Turbin

15 June 2010 15	Khimki	0 – 0	Krasnodar	Khimki
20:00 MSK (UTC+4)		Report	Yarkin (yellow card) 19'; Markov (yellow card) 90'	Stadium: Rodina Stadium; Attendance: 1,000; Referee: Aleksey Reznikov

23 June 2010 16	Krasnodar	3 – 3	Volga Nizhny Novgorod	Krasnodar
20:00 MSK (UTC+4)	Kaleshin 12' (pen.); Miroshnichenko (yellow card) 43'; Mikheyev 67'; Surnev 80'	Report	Khazov (yellow card) 47' (goal) 76'; Rashevsky 63'; Tarakanov 87' (o.g.)	Stadium: Kuban Stadium; Attendance: 9,500; Referee: Timur Arslanbekov

26 June 2010 17	Krasnodar	3 – 2	KAMAZ	Krasnodar
20:00 MSK (UTC+4)	Pazin 3'; Kaleshin 36' (pen.); Kulikov (yellow card) 41'; Markov (yellow card) 57'; Komkov 66'; Tatarchuk (yellow card) 90'	Report	Lozhkin (yellow card) 12'; Khisamov (yellow card) 15'; Serdyukov 23'; Perov (yellow card) 26'; Gogniyev 60' (yellow card) 79'; Nastusenko (yellow card) 71'	Stadium: Kuban Stadium; Attendance: 5,000; Referee: Sergey Lapochkin

6 July 2010 18	Irtysh	0 – 0	Krasnodar	Omsk
15:30 MSK (UTC+4)	Krolevets (yellow card) 72'	Report	Tatarchuk (yellow card) 87'	Stadium: Red Star Stadium; Attendance: 1,000; Referee: Vladimir Rogulev

9 July 2010 19	Ural Sverdlovsk Oblast	3 – 1	Krasnodar	Yekaterinburg
17:00 MSK (UTC+4)	Shatov (yellow card) 4' (goal) 70'; Zubko 39'; Temnikov (yellow card) 53'; Gerk 55'	Report	Komkov 21'; Oleinik (yellow card) 90'	Stadium: SKB-Bank Arena; Attendance: 4,000; Referee: German Kravchenko

30 July 2010 20	Krasnodar	0 – 0	Dynamo St.Petersburg	Krasnodar
20:30 MSK (UTC+4)		Report	Yepifanov (yellow card) 84'; Avsyuk (yellow card) 87'	Stadium: Kuban Stadium; Attendance: 7,000; Referee: Aleksey Reznikov

2 August 2010 21	Krasnodar	3 – 1	Baltika Kaliningrad	Krasnodar
20:30 MSK (UTC+4)	Kaleshin 25' (pen.); Gogniyev 36'; Bagayev (red card) 86'; Picușceac 87'	Report	Timofeyev 39'; Kryshtafovich (yellow card) 51'; Trinitatskiy (yellow card) 80'	Stadium: Kuban Stadium; Attendance: 8,500; Referee: Sergey Sergeev

10 August 2010 22	Dynamo Bryansk	4 – 3	Krasnodar	Bryansk
20:00 MSK (UTC+4)	Romaschenko (yellow card) 11' (goal) 14'; Minchenkov 56' (pen.); Fomichyov (yellow card) 65'; Magkeyev (yellow card) 79'; Krunić 83' (pen.); Kornilov (yellow card) 85' (goal) 90'	Report	Pazin 3', 12'; Gogniyev (yellow card) 25'; Kaleshin (yellow card) 70'; Markov (yellow card) 72'; Oleinik (yellow card) 81'; Surnev 86'	Stadium: Dynamo Stadium; Attendance: 7,000; Referee: Denis Shpilev

13 August 2010 23	Shinnik Yaroslavl	1 – 0	Krasnodar	Yaroslavl
19:00 MSK (UTC+4)	Karytska (yellow card) 32' (goal) 75' (pen.)	Report	Surnev (yellow card) 32'; Gogniyev (yellow card) 74'	Stadium: Shinnik Stadium; Attendance: 5,700; Referee: German Kravchenko

24 August 2010 24	Krasnodar	1 – 1	Zhemchuzhina-Sochi	Krasnodar
20:00 MSK (UTC+4)	Komkov 50'	Report	Danishevsky (yellow card) 45'; Lyakh (yellow card) 74'; Shishelov 77'	Stadium: Kuban Stadium; Attendance: 6,500; Referee: Vladimir Kazmenko

31 August 2010 25	Krasnodar	4 – 2	Nizhny Novgorod	Krasnodar
20:00 MSK (UTC+4)	Shipitsin (yellow card) 9' (yellow-red card) 40'; Dedechko 52'; Komkov 72'; Gogniyev 75'; Leshonok 90'	Report	Bendz (yellow card) 1'; Solovey (yellow card) 18'; Zyuzin (yellow card) 27'; Maksimov 45'; Mikuckis (yellow card) 51'; Salnikov 83'	Stadium: Kuban Stadium; Attendance: 6,500; Referee: Vladimir Rogulev

3 September 2010 26	Krasnodar	4 – 1	Mordovia Saransk	Krasnodar
20:00 MSK (UTC+4)	Kaleshin 16' (pen.) (yellow card) 77'; Gogniyev 34'; Komkov 39', 74'	Report	Rust.Mukhametshin 28'; Elysée (yellow card) 56'; Prokofyev (yellow card) 62'; Semler (yellow card) 65'; Tandelov (yellow card) 83'	Stadium: Kuban Stadium; Attendance: 4,200; Referee: Aleksandr Kolobaev

11 September 2010 27	Rotor Volgograd	0 – 1	Krasnodar	Volgograd
19:00 MSK (UTC+4)	Yepifanov (yellow card) 60'; Trifonov (yellow card) 84'; Ramazanov (yellow card) 90'	Report	Shipitsin (yellow card) 54'; Dedechko 61' (pen.); Bagayev (yellow card) 73'; Botvinyev (yellow card) 90'	Stadium: Central Stadium; Attendance: 4,500; Referee: Denis Mareev

14 September 2010 28	Volgar-Gazprom Astrakhan	2 – 1	Krasnodar	Astrakhan
19:00 MSK (UTC+4)	Zabolotny 3'; Sidyayev (yellow card) 18'; Volkov 23'	Report	Komkov (yellow card) 19' (yellow-red card) 69'; Picușceac 54'; Dedechko (yellow card) 61'	Stadium: Central Stadium; Attendance: 3,500; Referee: Sergey Sergeev

22 September 2010 29	Krasnodar	0 – 0	Avangard Kursk	Krasnodar
19:00 MSK (UTC+4)	Markov (yellow card) 63'	Report	I.Iljin (yellow card) 90'	Stadium: Kuban Stadium; Attendance: 7,300; Referee: Sergey Lapochkin

25 September 2010 30	Krasnodar	2 – 0	Salyut Belgorod	Krasnodar
19:00 MSK (UTC+4)	Dedechko 21'; Oleinik (yellow card) 36'; Gogniyev 55'	Report	Laizāns (yellow card) 56'; Kushov (yellow card) 90'; Chochiyev (yellow card) 90'	Stadium: Kuban Stadium; Attendance: 5,000; Referee: Maxim Layushkin

3 October 2010 31	Luch-Energiya	1 – 1	Krasnodar	Vladivostok
09:00 MSK (UTC+4)	Khlebnikov (yellow card) 61'; Udaly (yellow card) 87' (goal) 90'	Report	Mikheyev (yellow card) 21' (yellow-red card) 68' (goal) 52'	Stadium: Dynamo Stadium; Attendance: 3,200; Referee: Timur Arslanbekov

6 October 2010 32	SKA-Energiya Khabarovsk	1 – 0	Krasnodar	Khabarovsk
12:00 MSK (UTC+4)	Zapoyaska 62' (pen.)	Report	Kaleshin (yellow card) 5'; Shipitsin (yellow card) 10'; Tatarchuk (yellow card) 53'; Surnev (yellow card) 62'; Dedechko (yellow card) 65' (yellow-red card) 84'; Tsukanov (yellow card) 90'	Stadium: Lenin Stadium; Attendance: 2,000; Referee: Lasha Verulidze

14 October 2010 33	Krasnodar	0 – 1	Kuban Krasnodar	Krasnodar
19:00 MSK (UTC+4)	Martynovich (yellow card) 15'; Pazin (yellow card) 52'	Report	Bugayev (yellow card) 9'; Ignatyev 45'	Stadium: Kuban Stadium; Attendance: 12,500; Referee: Aleksandr Egorov

17 October 2010 34	Krasnodar	1 – 1	Khimki	Krasnodar
18:00 MSK (UTC+4)	Martynovich (yellow card) 11'; Mikheyev 57'; Bagayev (yellow card) 75'; Markov (yellow card) 90'	Report	Yusupov (yellow card) 24' (goal) 34'; Logashov (yellow card) 59'	Stadium: Kuban Stadium; Attendance: 5,000; Referee: Aleksey Lobanov

24 October 2010 35	Volga Nizhny Novgorod	4 – 1	Krasnodar	Nizhny Novgorod
17:00 MSK (UTC+4)	Martsvaladze 24' (pen.), 52', 55'; Yashin (yellow card) 60'; Khojava (yellow card) 53' (goal) 73'	Report	Mikheyev 12' (yellow card) 68'; Martynovich (yellow card) 24'; Dedechko (yellow card) 43'; Markov (yellow card) 58'	Stadium: Lokomotiv Stadium; Attendance: 7,000; Referee: Aleksey Reznikov

27 October 2010 36	KAMAZ	1 – 0	Krasnodar	Naberezhnye Chelny
19:00 MSK (UTC+4)	Serdyukov 53'; Lozhkin (yellow card) 81'	Report	Pazin (yellow card) 10'; Dedechko (yellow card) 39'; Mikheyev (yellow card) 62'; Bagayev (yellow card) 75'	Stadium: KAMAZ Stadium; Attendance: 4,500; Referee: Sergey Kuznetsov

3 November 2010 37	Krasnodar	2 – 0	Irtysh	Krasnodar
19:00 MSK (UTC+4)	Gogniyev 37'; Bagayev (yellow card) 81'; Pazin 82'	Report	Krolevets (yellow card) 81'; Krasnokutskiy (yellow card) 83'	Stadium: Kuban Stadium; Attendance: 5,000; Referee: Sergey Sergeev

6 November 2010 38	Krasnodar	1 – 0	Ural Sverdlovsk Oblast	Krasnodar
15:00 MSK (UTC+4)	Surnev (yellow card) 12'; Kaleshin 27' (pen.); Leshonok (yellow card) 31'	Report	Mamayev (yellow card) 27'	Stadium: Kuban Stadium; Attendance: 1,000; Referee: Sergey Lapochkin

=== Russian Cup ===
1 July 2010 Fifth Round	Zhemchuzhina-Sochi	0 – 1	Krasnodar	Sochi
20:00 MSK (UTC+4)	Murtazov (yellow card) 3'	Report	Dorozhkin 90'	Stadium: Sochi Central Stadium; Attendance: 5,400; Referee: Denis Mareev

14 July 2010 Round of 32	Krasnodar	2 – 1 (a.e.t.)	Tom Tomsk	Krasnodar
20:00 MSK (UTC+4)	Picuşceac 8'; Tsukanov (yellow card) 63'; Miroshnichenko (yellow card) 73'; Tatarchuk 96'; Knežević (yellow card) 115'; Kulikov (yellow card) 120'	Report	Dzyuba 42' (yellow card) 109'; Ivanov (yellow card) 58'; Dzhioyev (yellow card) 105' (yellow-red card) 120'	Stadium: Kuban Stadium; Attendance: 3,500; Referee: Mikhail Vilkov

Round 16 took place during the 2011–12 season.

== Squad statistics ==
As of match played 6 November 2010

=== Appearances and goals ===
No.	Pos	Nat	Player	Total		First Division		Russian Cup	
No.	Pos	Nat	Player	Apps	Goals	Apps	Goals	Apps	Goals
1	GK	(Russia) RUS	Aleksei Botvinyev	18	0	16	0	2	0
2	DF	(Uzbekistan) UZB	Nikolay Markov	32	0	32	0	0	0
3	MF	(Russia) RUS	Vladimir Leshonok	12	1	3+9	1	0	0
4	DF	(Belarus) BLR	Alyaksandr Martynovich	15	0	15	0	0	0
5	DF	(Russia) RUS	Yevgeni Kaleshin	34	11	33	11	1	0
6	DF	(Russia) RUS	Sergei Tsukanov	11	0	3+6	0	2	0
7	MF	(Russia) RUS	Andrei Pazin	39	6	38	6	1	0
8	MF	(Russia) RUS	Aleksandr Oleinik	32	0	19+11	0	2	0
9	FW	(Moldova) MDA	Igor Picușceac	16	2	2+12	1	2	1
10	FW	(Russia) RUS	Aleksandr Yarkin	25	5	14+11	5	0	0
11	FW	(Russia) RUS	Spartak Gogniyev	18	5	16+2	5	0	0
14	MF	(Russia) RUS	Vladimir Tatarchuk	23	1	8+13	0	2	1
15	DF	(Russia) RUS	Yegor Tarakanov	7	0	3+4	0	0	0
16	GK	(Russia) RUS	Denis Pchelintsev	23	0	22+1	0	0	0
17	DF	(Russia) RUS	Mikhail Bagayev	25	0	13+10	0	2	0
18	MF	(Russia) RUS	Azim Fatullayev	19	2	12+7	2	0	0
19	MF	(Russia) RUS	Nikita Zhdankin	2	0	0	0	1+1	0
21	MF	(Russia) RUS	Mikhail Komkov	31	8	24+6	8	1	0
22	MF	(Russia) RUS	Roman Surnev	34	3	25+8	3	1	0
23	MF	(Russia) RUS	Andrei Mikheyev	32	6	30+2	6	0	0
24	DF	(Russia) RUS	Sergei Miroshnichenko	18	1	16+1	1	1	0
25	MF	(Russia) RUS	Yevgeni Shipitsin	15	0	15	0	0	0
26	FW	(Montenegro) MNE	Ivan Knežević	17	1	1+14	1	1+1	0
27	MF	(Ukraine) UKR	Denys Dedechko	18	3	16+2	3	0	0
28	DF	(Montenegro) MNE	Ivan Novović	1	0	0+1	0	0	0
Players away from the club on loan:
11	FW	(Russia) RUS	Denis Dorozhkin	12	2	6+5	1	0+1	1
13	MF	(Russia) RUS	Aleksei Arkhipov	1	0	0	0	1	0
Players who appeared for Krasnodar that left during the season:
3	DF	(Russia) RUS	Aleksandr Kulikov	14	0	11+1	0	1+1	0
4	DF	(Russia) RUS	Aleksei Bugayev	5	0	5	0	0	0
25	DF	(Russia) RUS	Anatoli Romanovich	5	0	5	0	0	0
27	MF	(Bulgaria) BUL	Aleksandar Mladenov	4	0	0+3	0	1	0
33	MF	(Russia) RUS	Maksim Demenko	18	5	15+2	5	0+1	0

=== Goal Scorers ===
Place	Position	Nation	Number	Name	First Division	Russian Cup	Total
1	DF	(Russia)	5	Yevgeni Kaleshin	11	0	11
2	MF	(Russia)	21	Mikhail Komkov	8	0	8
3	MF	(Russia)	7	Andrei Pazin	6	0	6
3	FW	(Russia)	23	Andrei Mikheyev	6	0	6
4	MF	(Russia)	33	Maksim Demenko	5	0	5
4	FW	(Russia)	10	Aleksandr Yarkin	5	0	5
4	FW	(Russia)	11	Spartak Gogniyev	5	0	5
7	MF	(Russia)	22	Roman Surnev	3	0	3
7	MF	(Ukraine)	27	Denys Dedechko	3	0	3
7	FW	(Moldova)	9	Igor Picușceac	2	1	3
8	MF	(Russia)	18	Azim Fatullayev	2	0	2
8	FW	(Russia)	11	Denis Dorozhkin	1	1	2
10	FW	(Montenegro)	26	Ivan Knežević	1	0	1
10	DF	(Russia)	24	Sergei Miroshnichenko	1	0	1
10	MF	(Russia)	3	Vladimir Leshonok	1	0	1
10	MF	(Russia)	14	Vladimir Tatarchuk	0	1	1
				TOTALS	60	3	63

=== Clean sheets ===
Place	Position	Nation	Number	Name	First Division	Russian Cup	Total
1	GK	(Russia)	16	Denis Pchelintsev	10	0	10
2	GK	(Russia)	1	Aleksei Botvinyev	3	1	4
				TOTALS	13	1	14

=== Disciplinary record ===
Number	Nation	Position	Name	First Division		Russian Cup		Total	
Number	Nation	Position	Name	Yellow card	Red card	Yellow card	Red card	Yellow card	Red card
1	(Russia)	GK	Aleksei Botvinyev	1	0	0	0	1	0
2	(Uzbekistan)	DF	Nikolay Markov	11	0	0	0	11	0
3	(Russia)	MF	Vladimir Leshonok	1	0	0	0	1	0
4	(Belarus)	DF	Alyaksandr Martynovich	3	0	0	0	0	0
5	(Russia)	DF	Yevgeni Kaleshin	5	0	0	0	5	0
6	(Russia)	DF	Sergei Tsukanov	1	0	1	0	2	0
7	(Russia)	MF	Andrei Pazin	3	0	0	0	0	0
8	(Russia)	MF	Aleksandr Oleinik	4	0	0	0	0	0
10	(Russia)	FW	Aleksandr Yarkin	2	0	0	0	2	0
11	(Russia)	FW	Spartak Gogniyev	2	0	0	0	2	0
14	(Russia)	MF	Vladimir Tatarchuk	3	0	0	0	0	0
17	(Russia)	MF	Mikhail Bagayev	4	1	0	0	0	0
18	(Russia)	MF	Azim Fatullayev	2	0	0	0	2	0
21	(Russia)	MF	Mikhail Komkov	5	1	0	0	0	0
22	(Russia)	MF	Roman Surnev	5	0	0	0	5	0
23	(Russia)	MF	Andrei Mikheyev	9	1	0	0	9	1
24	(Russia)	DF	Sergei Miroshnichenko	3	0	1	0	4	0
25	(Russia)	MF	Yevgeni Shipitsin	4	1	0	0	0	0
26	(Montenegro)	FW	Ivan Knežević	1	0	1	0	2	0
27	(Ukraine)	MF	Denys Dedechko	5	1	0	0	0	0
Players away on loan:
11	(Russia)	FW	Denis Dorozhkin	1	0	0	0	1	0
Players who left Krasnodar during the season:
3	(Russia)	DF	Aleksandr Kulikov	1	0	1	0	2	0
4	(Russia)	DF	Aleksei Bugayev	1	0	0	0	1	0
25	(Russia)	DF	Anatoli Romanovich	1	0	0	0	1	0
33	(Russia)	MF	Maksim Demenko	4	0	0	0	0	0
			TOTALS	82	5	4	0	86	5
