= Yarkin =

Yarkin (Russian: Яркин) is a Russian surname. Notable people with the surname include:

- Aleksandr Dmitriyevich Yarkin (born 1969), Russian footballer and coach
- Aleksandr Yarkin (born 1986), Russian footballer
- Anatoly Yarkin (born 1958), Soviet cyclist
- Vladislav Yarkin (born 1965), Russian football player
- Sarah Yarkin (born 1993), American actress
