= 2014 Russian Cup final =

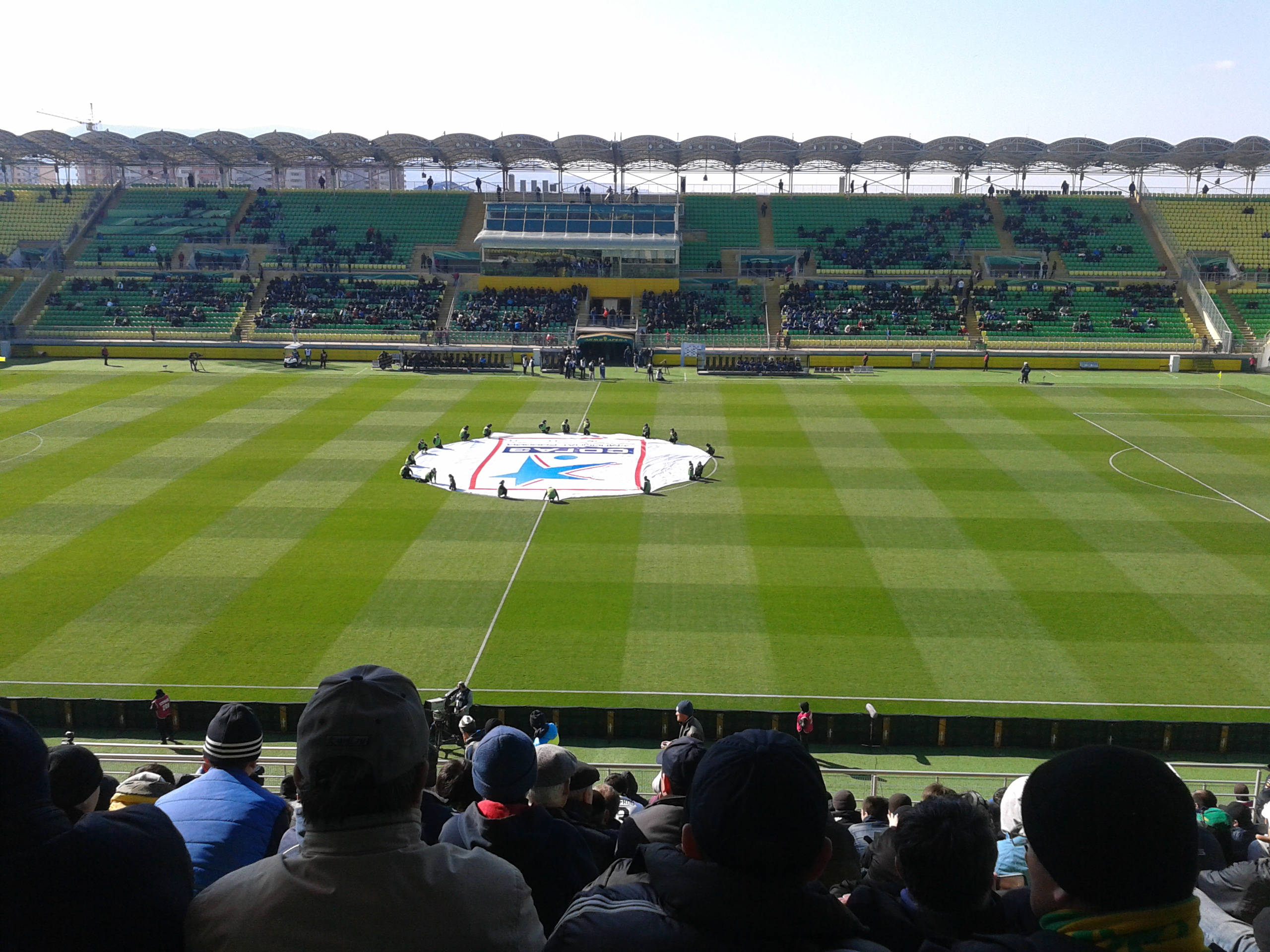
- Event: 2013–14 Russian Cup
| Krasnodar | Rostov |
| 0 | 0 |
- After extra time Rostov won 6–5 on penalties
- Date: 8 May 2014
- Venue: Anzhi Arena, Kaspiysk
- Man of the Match: Stipe Pletikosa
- Referee: Sergei Karasev
- Attendance: 19,500
- Weather: Partially cloudy; 21°C

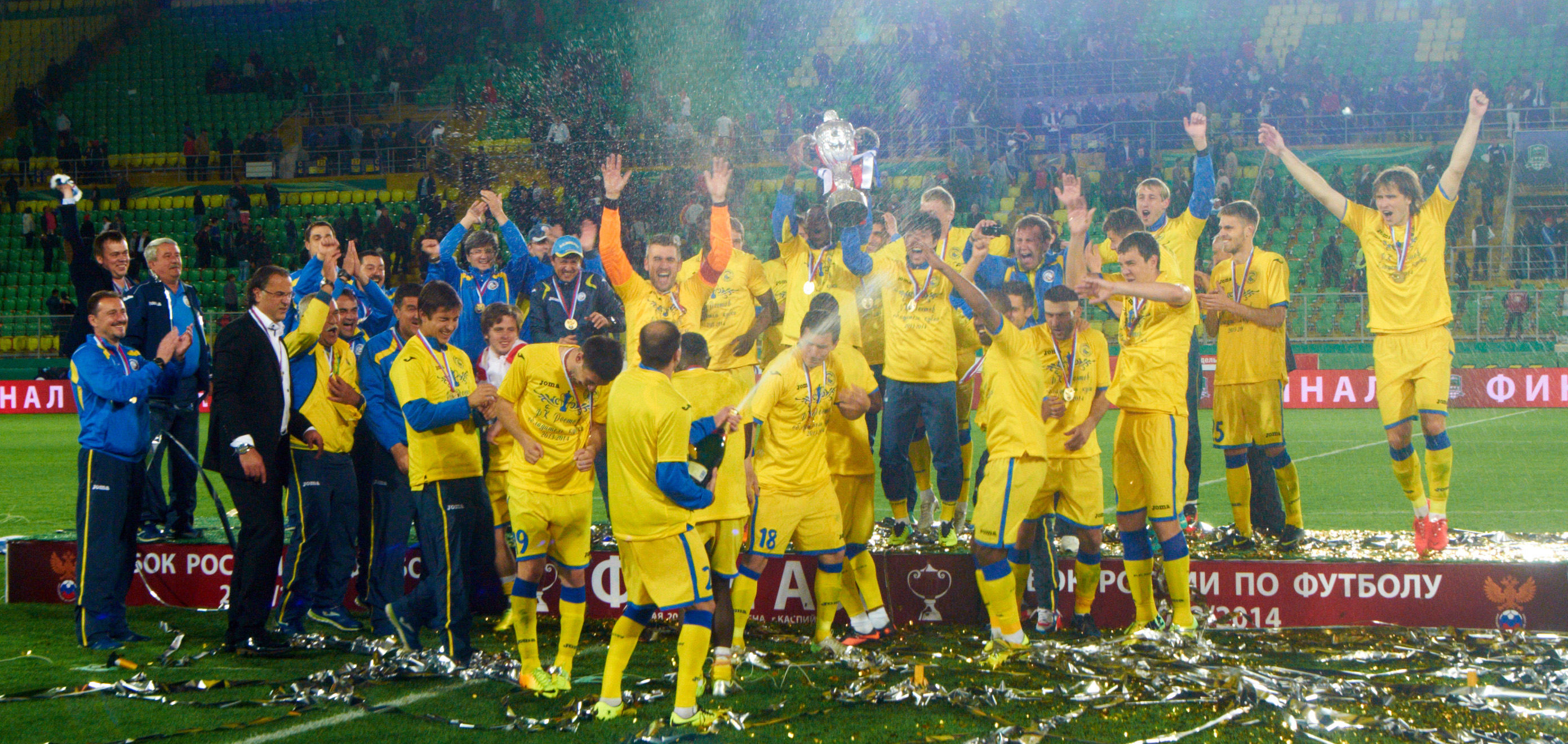
FC Rostov - winner of the Russian cup 2013-14

The 2014 Russian Cup final decided the winner of the 2013–14 Russian Cup, the 22nd season of Russia's main football cup. It was played on 8 May 2014 at the Anzhi Arena in Kaspiysk, between Russian Premier League sides Krasnodar and Rostov.

After drawing the game 0–0 through added extra time, Rostov won 6–5 in a dramatic penalty shoot-out that saw both sides miss penalty kicks.

The shoot-out win brought relief for Rostov, winning their first major trophy having lost the 2003 Russian Cup final to FC Spartak Moscow 0–1.

As winners, FC Rostov qualified for the group stage of the UEFA Europa League and also faced CSKA Moscow, champions of the 2013–14 Russian Premier League, in the Russian Super Cup on 26 July 2014.

== Road to the final ==
| Krasnodar | | Round | Rostov |
|---|---|---|---|---|
| Opponent | Result | 2013–14 Russian Cup | Opponent | Result |
| Dolgoprudny | 1–4 | Round of 32 | Angusht | 0–1 |
| FC Ryazan | 3–2 | Round of 16 | FC Spartak Vladikavkaz | 3–0 |
| FC Tosno | 3–0 | Quarter-finals | FC Rotor Volgograd | 3–0 |
| CSKA Moscow | 0–1 | Semi-finals | FC Luch Vladivostok | 3–1 |

== Match details ==
8 May 2014
18:30

| Krasnodar (1) | 0–0 (a.e.t.) | Rostov (1) |
|---|---|---|
| | Report |
Penalties
| Granqvist (penalty scored); Abreu (penalty scored); Laborde (penalty scored); Joãozinho (penalty scored); Ari (penalty scored); Sigurðsson (penalty missed); Gazinskiy (penalty missed) | 5–6 | (penalty scored) Milić; (penalty scored) Poloz; (penalty scored) Dyakov; (penalty scored) Sinama Pongolle; (penalty scored) Dzyuba; (penalty missed) Gațcan; (penalty scored) Lolo |

Anzhi-Arena, Kaspiysk
Attendance: 19,500
Referee: Sergei Karasev

| GK | 88 | (Russia) Andrei Sinitsyn |
| DF | 5 | (Poland) Artur Jędrzejczyk |
| DF | 27 | (Iceland) Ragnar Sigurðsson | (yellow card) 38' |
| DF | 8 | (Russia) Yury Gazinsky | (yellow card) 34' |
| DF | 6 | (Sweden) Andreas Granqvist (c) | (yellow card) 57' |
| DF | 17 | (Russia) Vitali Kaleshin |
| MF | 25 | (Russia) Yevgeni Shipitsin | (yellow card) 55' | | (substituted off) 82' |
| MF | 33 | (Uruguay) Mauricio Pereyra | (red card) 87' |
| MF | 14 | (Brazil) Wanderson | (substituted off) 106' |
| MF | 22 | (Brazil) Joãozinho |
| FW | 9 | (Russia) Ari | | (substituted off) 64' |
Substitutes:
| GK | 23 | (Russia) Aleksandr Filtsov |
| DF | 4 | (Belarus) Alyaksandr Martynovich |
| DF | 2 | (Russia) Nikolay Markov |
| DF | 98 | (Russia) Sergei Petrov |
| MF | 26 | (Portugal) Márcio Abreu | | (substituted on) 82' |
| MF | 16 | (Russia) Aleksei Pomerko |
| FW | 21 | (Colombia) Ricardo Laborde | | (substituted on) 106' |
Manager:
(Russia) Oleg Kononov

| GK | 1 | (Croatia) Stipe Pletikosa (c) |
| DF | 25 | (Russia) Arseny Logashov | (yellow card) 52' |
| DF | 5 | (Russia) Vitali Dyakov |
| DF | 15 | (Angola) Bastos | | (red card) 100' |
| DF | 19 | (Croatia) Hrvoje Milić |
| MF | 84 | (Moldova) Alexandru Gațcan |
| MF | 18 | (Russia) Azim Fatullayev |
| MF | 2 | (Belarus) Timofei Kalachev | (yellow card) 77' | (substituted off) 103' |
| MF | 49 | (Georgia (country)) Jano Ananidze | | (substituted off) 86' |
| FW | 9 | (Gabon) Guélor Kanga | | (substituted off) 18' |
| FW | 10 | (Russia) Artem Dzyuba |
Substitutes:
| GK | 16 | (Belarus) Anton Amelchenko |
| DF | 27 | (Ivory Coast) Igor Lolo | | (substituted on) 103' |
| DF | 33 | (Russia) Roman Yemelyanov |
| MF | 7 | (Russia) Georgy Gabulov |
| MF | 24 | (France) Florent Sinama Pongolle | | (substituted on) 18' |
| FW | 14 | (Russia) Dmitry Poloz | | (substituted on) 86' |
| FW | 11 | (South Korea) Yoo Byung-soo |
Manager:
(Montenegro) Miodrag Božović

Match rules

- 90 minutes.
- 30 minutes of extra-time if necessary.
- Penalty shoot-out if scores still level.
- Seven named substitutes.
- Maximum of three substitutions.
