= Aleksandr Yarkin =

Aleksandr Yarkin may refer to:

- Aleksandr Yarkin (footballer, born 1969), Russian football manager and former forward
- Aleksandr Yarkin (footballer, born 1986), Russian football forward, and nephew of above manager
