= Loktionov =

Loktionov (Russian: Локтионов) is a Russian masculine surname, its feminine counterpart is Loktionova. It may refer to

- Andrei Loktionov (born 1990), Russian professional ice hockey player
- Aleksandr Loktionov (1893–1941), Soviet military officer
- Roman Loktionov (disambiguation), several people
