= Khlebnikov (disambiguation) =

Khlebnikov is a surname.

It may also refer to:

- Khlebnikov (firm), Russian jewelry firm, founded in 1867
- Russian icebreaker Kapitan Khlebnikov
- Khlebnikov Codex, a codex of Rus' chronicles compiled in the 1560s

== See also ==
- Khlebnikovo
