= Dorokhin =

Dorokhin (Russian: Дорохин) is a Russian masculine surname, its feminine counterpart is Dorokhina. It may refer to

- Igor Dorokhin (born 1962), Kazakhstani-German ice hockey player
- Pavel Dorokhin (born 1984), Russian football player
- Yevgeniy Dorokhin (born 1986), Russian sprint canoer
