= Dmitri Shlyakhtin =

Russian footballer

Personal information
- Full name: Dmitri Alekseyevich Shlyakhtin
- Date of birth: 19 October 1981 (age 45)
- Height: 1.87 m (6 ft 2 in)
- Position: Defender

Senior career*
Years	Team	Apps	(Gls)
1999	FC Neftekhimik Nizhnekamsk	4	(0)
2002	FC Neftekhimik Nizhnekamsk	2	(0)
2003–2005	FC Alnas Almetyevsk	64	(2)
2005	FC Neftekhimik Nizhnekamsk	15	(0)
2006	FC Dynamo Kirov	14	(0)
2007	FC Alnas Almetyevsk	25	(1)
2009	FC Neftekhimik Nizhnekamsk	6	(0)
2010	FC Shinnik Nizhnekamsk		
- * Club domestic league appearances and goals

Dmitri Alekseyevich Shlyakhtin (Russian: Дмитрий Алексеевич Шляхтин; born 19 October 1981) is a former Russian professional football player.

== Club career ==
He played in the Russian Football National League for FC Neftekhimik Nizhnekamsk in 2002.

== See also ==
- Football in Russia
