= Alexander Oleinik =

Alexander Oleinik may refer to:

- Aleksandr Oleinik (born 1982), Russian footballer
- Alexander Oleinik (kickboxer) (born 1986), Ukrainian kickboxer and Muay Thai fighter

== See also ==
- Oleksandr Oliynyk (born 1987), Ukrainian footballer
- Alexandru Oleinic (born 1959), Moldovan politician
