= Loshkaryov =

Loshkaryov (Russian: Лошкарёв) or Lashkaryov (Ukrainian: Лашкарёв) is a Russian masculine surname, its feminine counterpart is Loshkaryova. It may refer to

- Dmitry Loshkaryov (born 1987), Russian association football player
- Vadim Lashkaryov (1903–1974), Soviet experimental physicist
