= Aleksandr Perov =

Aleksandr Perov can refer to:

- Aleksandr Perov (cyclist) (born 1954), a Soviet former cyclist and Olympic medalist
- Aleksandr Perov (footballer) (born 1978), a Russian professional football coach and a former player
