= Marat Magkeyev =

Russian footballer

Personal information
- Full name: Marat Rostislavovich Magkeyev
- Date of birth: 24 September 1983 (age 43)
- Height: 1.85 m (6 ft 1 in)
- Positions: Defender; midfielder

Senior career*
Years	Team	Apps	(Gls)
2001–2004	FC Avtodor Vladikavkaz	49	(1)
2005	FC Chernomorets Novorossiysk (D4)		
2006	FC Spartak-UGP Anapa	7	(0)
2006	FC Chernomorets Novorossiysk	7	(0)
2007	FC Spartak-UGP Anapa	6	(0)
2007	FC Nara-Desna Naro-Fominsk	7	(0)
2008	FC Alnas Almetyevsk	19	(3)
2009	FC Gazovik Orenburg	3	(0)
2009	FC Druzhba Maykop	12	(0)
2010	FC Dynamo Bryansk	22	(1)
2011	FC Jūrmala	12	(0)
2011	FC Dynamo Stavropol	9	(1)
2012	FC Druzhba Maykop	6	(0)
2013–2014	FC Dynamo Bryansk	10	(0)
- * Club domestic league appearances and goals

Marat Rostislavovich Magkeyev (Russian: Марат Ростиславович Магкеев; born 24 September 1983) is a former Russian professional football player.

== Club career ==
He played in the Russian Football National League for FC Dynamo Bryansk in 2010.
