= Daniil Kondakov =

Russian footballer (born 2008)

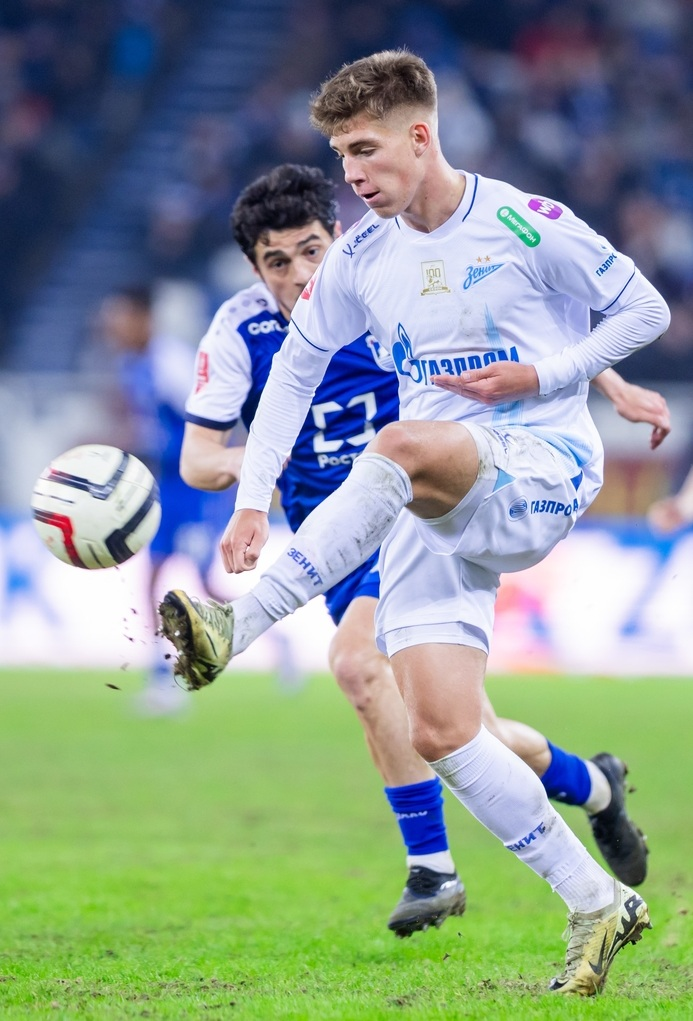
- Kondakov with Zenit in 2026

Personal information
- Full name: Daniil Denisovich Kondakov
- Date of birth: 6 March 2008 (age 18)
- Place of birth: Kursk, Russia
- Height: 1.78 m (5 ft 10 in)
- Positions: Central midfielder; attacking midfielder

Team information
- Current team: Zenit St. Petersburg
- Number: 61

Youth career
- –2021: Avangard Kursk
- 2021–2022: Krasnodar
- 2022–2025: Zenit St. Petersburg

Senior career*
Years	Team	Apps	(Gls)
2025	Zenit-2 St. Petersburg	12	(0)
2025–	Zenit St. Petersburg	18	(0)

International career^{‡}
2023	Russia U15	4	(0)
2023–2024	Russia U16	7	(3)
2025	Russia U17	2	(1)
2025–	Russia U18	6	(0)
- * Club domestic league appearances and goals as of 2 November 2026 ‡ National team caps and goals as of 15 November 2025

Daniil Denisovich Kondakov (Russian: Даниил Денисович Кондаков; born 6 March 2008) is a Russian football player who plays as a central midfielder or attacking midfielder for Zenit St. Petersburg.

== Career ==
Kondakov made his debut for the senior squad of Zenit St. Petersburg on 30 September 2025 in a Russian Cup game against Rubin Kazan. He made his Russian Premier League debut for Zenit on 8 March 2026 in a game against Orenburg.

== Personal life ==
Daniil is a son of former footballer Denis Kondakov.

== Career statistics ==
As of 2 November 2026

Club	Season	League			Cup		Total	
Club	Season	Division	Apps	Goals	Apps	Goals	Apps	Goals
Zenit-2 St. Petersburg	2025	Russian Second League B	12	0	—		12	0
Zenit St. Petersburg	2025–26	Russian Premier League	10	0	5	0	15	0
Zenit St. Petersburg	2026–27	Russian Premier League	8	0	4	1	12	1
Zenit St. Petersburg	Total		18	0	9	1	27	1
Career total			30	0	9	1	39	1

== Honours ==
Zenit-2 Saint Petersburg

- Russian Second League Division B: 2025

Zenit Saint Petersburg

- Russian Premier League: 2025–26
- Russian Super Cup: 2026
