= Roman Loktionov =

Roman Loktionov may refer to:

- Roman Loktionov (footballer, born 1985), Russian football defender
- Roman Loktionov (footballer, born 1986), Ukrainian football forward
