= Rafael Khisamov =

Russian footballer

Personal information
- Full name: Rafael Radikovich Khisamov
- Date of birth: 19 August 1987 (age 39)
- Place of birth: Almetyevsk, Russian SFSR
- Height: 1.83 m (6 ft 0 in)
- Position: Defender

Youth career
- FC Alnas Almetyevsk

Senior career*
Years	Team	Apps	(Gls)
- FC Alnas Almetyevsk-d
2006	FC Alnas Almetyevsk	0	(0)
- FC Neftyanik Buguruslan (amateur)
2008	FC Alnas Almetyevsk	26	(0)
2009	FC SOYUZ-Gazprom Izhevsk	30	(3)
2010–2012	FC KAMAZ Naberezhnye Chelny	62	(3)
2012–2013	FC Gazovik Orenburg	5	(0)
2013	FC Zenit-Izhevsk	0	(0)
- * Club domestic league appearances and goals

Rafael Radikovich Khisamov (Russian: Рафаэль Радикович Хисамов; born 19 August 1987) is a former Russian professional football player.

== Club career ==
He played two seasons in the Russian Football National League for FC KAMAZ Naberezhnye Chelny.
