= Khlebnikov =

Khlebnikov, Khlebnikova (Russian: Хлебников, Хлебникова) or Klebnikov is a Russian surname, meaning a maker of bread (Russian: хлеб, khleb), may refer to:

- Aleksandr Khlebnikov (born 1984), Russian football player
- Boris Khlebnikov
- Paul Klebnikov (1963–2004), American journalist and historian
- Sergey Khlebnikov (1955–1999), Russian Olympic speed skater
- Sergey Khlebnikov (general)
- Valery Khlebnikov (born 1981), Russian ice hockey player
- Velimir Khlebnikov (1885–1922), Russian poet and playwright
- Marina Khlebnikova (born 1965), Russian singer and actress, winner of a Golden Gramophone Award
