= Vladimir Tatarchuk =

Vladimir Tatarchuk may refer to:

- Vladimir Tatarchuk (footballer, born 1966), Russian football manager and former midfielder
- Vladimir Tatarchuk (footballer, born 1987), Russian football midfielder, and son of footballer born 1987
