= Yevgeni Shelyutov =

Russian footballer

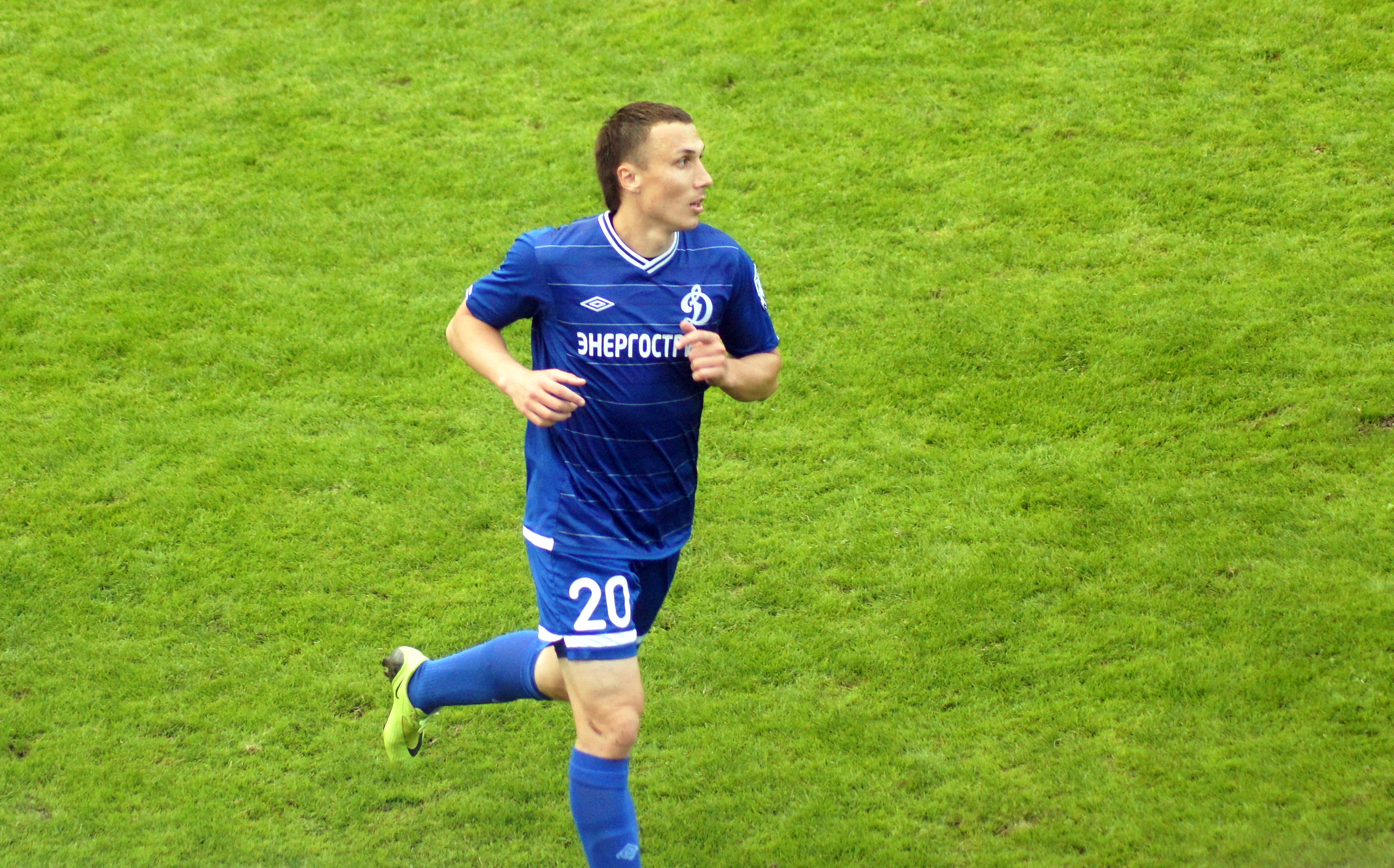

Personal information
- Full name: Yevgeni Yevgenyevich Shelyutov
- Date of birth: 29 August 1981 (age 45)
- Place of birth: Karachev, Russian SFSR
- Height: 1.81 m (5 ft 11 1/2 in)
- Position: Forward

Youth career
- Sputnik Karachev

Senior career*
Years	Team	Apps	(Gls)
1998–2000	FC Sputnik Karachev		
2001–2005	FC Dynamo Bryansk	121	(28)
2006	FC Sputnik Karachev		
2006	DYuSSh-Dynamo Bryansk		
2007–2008	FC Dynamo Bryansk	78	(21)
2009	FC Salyut-Energia Belgorod	22	(3)
2010	FC Dynamo Bryansk	6	(0)
2011–2012	FC Rusichi Oryol	19	(0)
2012	FC Dynamo Bryansk (amateur)		
2013	FC Oryol	10	(1)
2014–2015	FC Sputnik Karachev		
- * Club domestic league appearances and goals

Yevgeni Yevgenyevich Shelyutov (Russian: Евгений Евгеньевич Шелютов; born 29 August 1981) is a former Russian professional football player.

== Club career ==
He played 6 seasons in the Russian Football National League for FC Dynamo Bryansk and FC Salyut-Energia Belgorod.

== Personal life ==
His younger brother Oleg Shelyutov is also a footballer.
