= Mikhail Bagayev =

Russian footballer (born 1985)

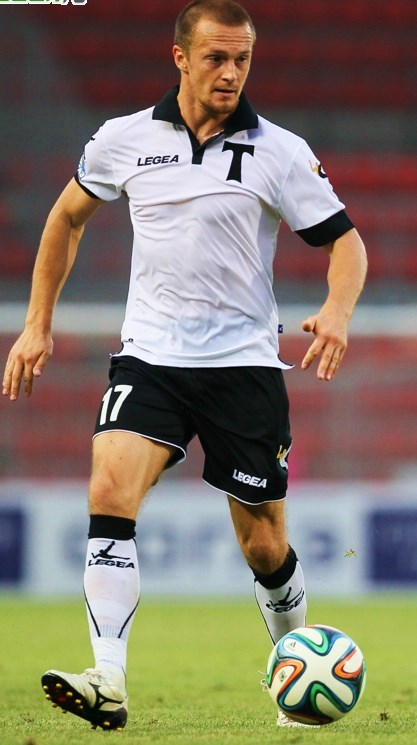
- Bagayev with Torpedo Moscow in 2014

Personal information
- Full name: Mikhail Nikolayevich Bagayev
- Date of birth: 28 February 1985 (age 41)
- Place of birth: Kirov, Russian SFSR
- Height: 1.78 m (5 ft 10 in)
- Position: Defender

Youth career
- 1992–1998: DYuSSh №5 Kirov
- 1998–2002: Dynamo Izhevsk

Senior career*
Years	Team	Apps	(Gls)
2002	Dynamo-Mashinostroitel Kirov	6	(0)
2003	Dynamo Izhevsk	33	(0)
2004	Dynamo Kirov	32	(0)
2005	Moscow	0	(0)
2006–2007	Rubin Kazan	0	(0)
2007	→ SKA-Energiya Khabarovsk (loan)	18	(1)
2008–2009	SKA-Energiya Khabarovsk	59	(6)
2009–2010	Krasnodar	36	(1)
2011–2013	Spartak Nalchik	69	(0)
2013–2015	Torpedo Moscow	37	(2)
2015	→ Tyumen (loan)	13	(0)
2015–2017	Fakel Voronezh	75	(0)
2017–2019	Avangard Kursk	73	(1)
2019	Torpedo Moscow	20	(0)
2020	Znamya Truda Orekhovo-Zuyevo	15	(0)
2021	SSh №75 (amateur)		
2022	Rosich Moscow oblast (amateur)		
2023	Uralets Moscow (amateur)		
2024	Rosich Moscow oblast (amateur)		

Managerial career
- 2024: KSSS Kirovo-Chepetsk (sports director)
- * Club domestic league appearances and goals

Mikhail Nikolayevich Bagayev (Russian: Михаил Николаевич Багаев; born 28 February 1985) is a Russian former professional footballer who played as a defender.

== Career ==
Bagayev played for the main squads of Moscow and Rubin Kazan in the Russian Cup.

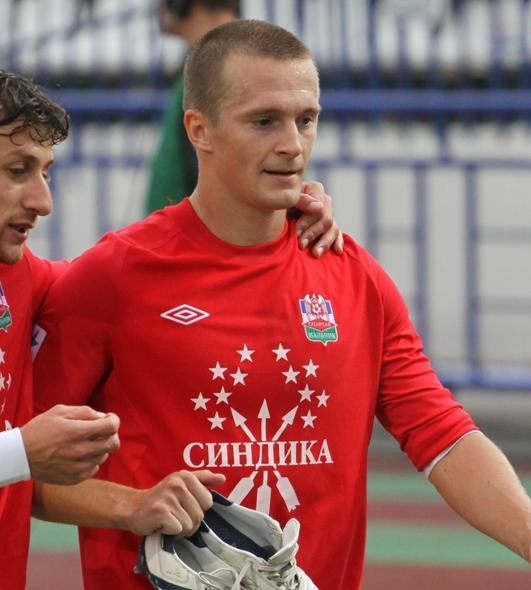
A photo of Mikhail Bagayev with Spartak Nalchik in 2011.

He made his Russian Premier League debut for Spartak Nalchik on 12 March 2011 in a game against Krylia Sovetov Samara.

He played in the 2017–18 Russian Cup final for Avangard Kursk on 9 May 2018 in the Volgograd Arena against 2–1 winners Tosno.
