= Aleksei Botvinyev =

Russian footballer

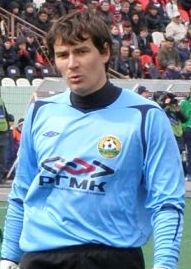

Personal information
- Full name: Aleksei Vladimirovich Botvinyev
- Date of birth: 25 June 1981 (age 45)
- Place of birth: Kolomna, Soviet Union
- Height: 1.94 m (6 ft 4 in)
- Position: Goalkeeper

Team information
- Current team: FC Lokomotiv Moscow (GK coach)

Youth career
- FC Kolomna

Senior career*
Years	Team	Apps	(Gls)
1998–1999	FC Kolomna	54	(0)
2000–2004	FC Shakhtar Donetsk	0	(0)
2000–2004	→ FC Shakhtar-2 Donetsk	87	(0)
2000–2002	→ FC Shakhtar-3 Donetsk	19	(0)
2007–2010	FC Saturn Moscow Oblast	4	(0)
2009	→ FC Kuban Krasnodar (loan)	14	(0)
2010	→ FC Krasnodar (loan)	16	(0)
2011–2012	FC Tom Tomsk	6	(0)

Managerial career
- 2013: FC Kolomna-2 (assistant)
- 2014: FC StArs Kolomensky District (assistant)
- 2014–2015: FC StArs Kolomensky District
- 2015–2020: UOR #5 Yegoryevsk (GK coach)
- 2020–2024: FC Khimki (GK coach)
- 2024–: FC Lokomotiv Moscow (GK coach)
- * Club domestic league appearances and goals

Aleksei Vladimirovich Botvinyev (Russian: Алексей Владимирович Ботвиньев; born 25 June 1981) is a Russian football coach and a former player. He is the goalkeepers' coach with FC Lokomotiv Moscow.

== Club career ==
=== Tom Tomsk ===
On 26 December 2010, Botvinyev signed a three-year contract with Russian Premier League side FC Tom Tomsk.
