= Oleg Pravilo =

Russian footballer

Personal information
- Full name: Oleg Vasilyevich Pravilo
- Date of birth: 27 October 1988 (age 38)
- Place of birth: Maykop, Russian SFSR
- Height: 1.87 m (6 ft 2 in)
- Positions: Midfielder; defender

Senior career*
Years	Team	Apps	(Gls)
2006	FC Lokomotiv-KMV Mineralnye Vody (amateur)		
2008–2010	FC Krasnodar-2000	73	(1)
2010	→ FC Dynamo Bryansk (loan)	6	(0)
2011	FC Biolog-Novokubansk Progress	22	(2)
2012–2014	FC Torpedo Armavir	60	(9)
2014–2016	FC Afips Afipsky	50	(9)
2016	FC SKA Rostov-on-Don	4	(0)
2017	FC Druzhba Maykop	12	(2)
- * Club domestic league appearances and goals

Oleg Vasilyevich Pravilo (Russian: Олег Васильевич Правило; born 27 October 1988) is a Russian former professional football player.

== Club career ==
He made his Russian Football National League debut for FC Dynamo Bryansk on 27 March 2010 in a game against FC Shinnik Yaroslavl. That was his only season in the FNL.
