= Dmitri Yepifanov =

Russian footballer

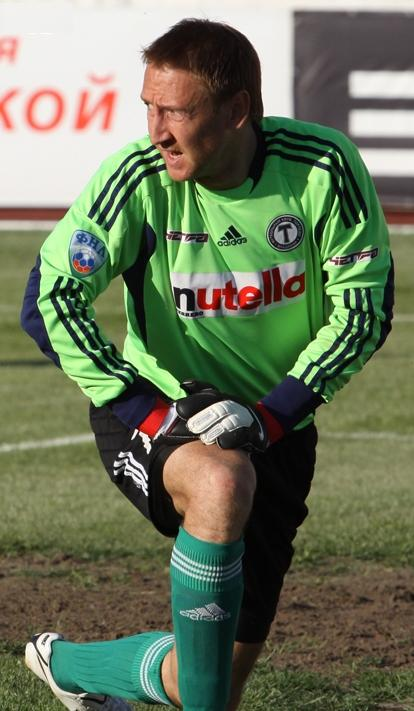

Personal information
- Full name: Dmitri Borisovich Yepifanov
- Date of birth: 31 January 1978 (age 48)
- Place of birth: Moscow, Russia
- Height: 1.83 m (6 ft 0 in)
- Position: Goalkeeper

Team information
- Current team: FC Kuban Krasnodar (GK coach)

Youth career
- 1984–1994: FC Spartak Moscow

Senior career*
Years	Team	Apps	(Gls)
1994–1998	FC Spartak-2 Moscow	68	(0)
1998	FC Anzhi Makhachkala	10	(0)
1999–2000	FC Spartak-Chukotka Moscow	34	(0)
2000	FC Rostselmash-2 Rostov-on-Don	6	(0)
2001	FC Arsenal Tula	1	(0)
2001–2003	FC Metallurg Lipetsk	65	(0)
2004–2005	FC Oryol	27	(0)
2006	FC SKA-Energiya Khabarovsk	15	(0)
2007–2008	FC Gazovik Orenburg	43	(0)
2009	FC Kaisar	22	(0)
2010	FC Dynamo Saint Petersburg	24	(0)
2011–2012	FC Torpedo Vladimir	22	(0)
2012–2014	FC Dolgoprudny	5	(0)

Managerial career
- 2012–2015: FC Dolgoprudny (GK coach)
- 2016–2021: Russia Women's (GK coach)
- 2022–2023: FC Spartak Moscow (U19 GK coach)
- 2023–: FC Kuban Krasnodar (GK coach)
- * Club domestic league appearances and goals

Dmitri Borisovich Yepifanov (Russian: Дмитрий Борисович Епифанов; born 31 January 1978) is a Russian professional football coach and a former player. He is the goalkeepers' coach for FC Kuban Krasnodar.

== Club career ==
He made his Russian Football National League debut for FC Anzhi Makhachkala on 19 September 1998 in a game against FC Kuban Krasnodar. He played 9 seasons in the FNL for 8 different clubs throughout his career.
