= Ivan Zhirny =

Russian footballer

Personal information
- Full name: Ivan Vasilyevich Zhirny
- Date of birth: 27 September 1983 (age 43)
- Height: 1.77 m (5 ft 9 1/2 in)
- Position: Defender

Senior career*
Years	Team	Apps	(Gls)
2004–2013	FC Salyut Belgorod	259	(1)
2014	FC SKChF Sevastopol	17	(0)
- * Club domestic league appearances and goals

Ivan Vasilyevich Zhirny (Russian: Жирный Иван Васильевич; born 27 September 1983) is a former Russian professional football player.

== Club career ==
He played 7 seasons in the Russian Football National League for FC Salyut Belgorod.
