= Lev Kornilov =

Russian footballer

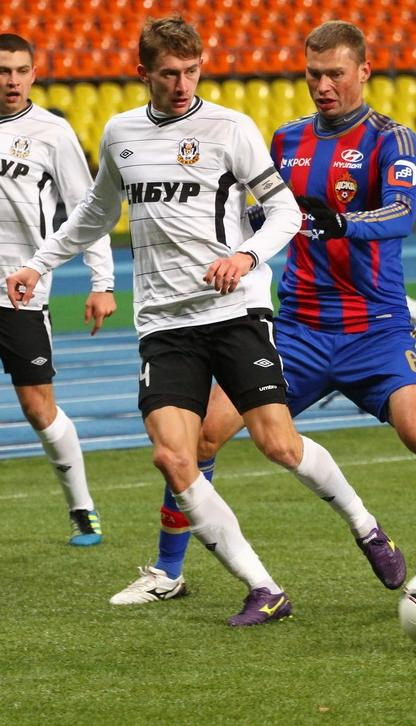
- Kornilov with Tyumen in 2012

Personal information
- Full name: Lev Sergeyevich Kornilov
- Date of birth: 26 January 1984 (age 42)
- Place of birth: Nakhodka, Russian SFSR
- Height: 1.81 m (5 ft 11 in)
- Position: Midfielder

Youth career
- Vodnik Nakhodka

Senior career*
Years	Team	Apps	(Gls)
2006–2007	FC Okean Nakhodka	49	(2)
2008	FC Dynamo Barnaul	32	(3)
2009	FC Ural Sverdlovsk Oblast	19	(0)
2009	FC Luch-Energiya Vladivostok	14	(0)
2010	FC SKA-Energiya Khabarovsk	18	(0)
2010–2011	FC Dynamo Bryansk	42	(3)
2012–2013	FC Tyumen	32	(2)
2013–2014	FC Torpedo Moscow	10	(0)
2014–2015	FC Saturn Ramenskoye	21	(0)
2016	FC Nosta Novotroitsk	9	(0)
2016–2017	FC Neftekhimik Nizhnekamsk	27	(0)
2017–2018	FC Syzran-2003	20	(0)

International career
	Abkhazia	2	(2)
- * Club domestic league appearances and goals

Lev Sergeyevich Kornilov (Russian: Лев Серге́евич Корнилов; born 26 January 1984) is a Russian former professional footballer.

== Club career ==
He played 6 seasons in the Russian Football National League for 7 different teams.
