= Andrei Salnikov =

Russian footballer

Personal information
- Full name: Andrei Vladimirovich Salnikov
- Date of birth: 13 March 1982 (age 44)
- Place of birth: Murom, Russian SFSR
- Height: 1.90 m (6 ft 3 in)
- Positions: Forward; midfielder

Senior career*
Years	Team	Apps	(Gls)
2001	FC Torpedo Moscow	0	(0)
2002–2003	FC Titan Moscow	39	(13)
2003	FC Ural Yekaterinburg	20	(14)
2004–2005	FC Kuban Krasnodar	38	(4)
2004	→ PFC Spartak Nalchik (loan)	17	(6)
2006	FC Lada Togliatti	38	(8)
2007	FC Ural Yekaterinburg	20	(2)
2007	FC Zvezda Irkutsk	15	(5)
2008	FC Chernomorets Novorossiysk	9	(0)
2008–2011	FC Nizhny Novgorod	82	(20)
2009	→ FC Ordabasy (loan)	9	(0)
2009	→ FC Zhetysu (loan)	9	(0)
2012–2013	FC Baltika Kaliningrad	42	(11)
2014	FC Fakel Voronezh	14	(5)
2014	FC Vybor-Kurbatovo Voronezh	10	(2)
2015–2016	FC Dynamo Bryansk	19	(0)
- * Club domestic league appearances and goals

Andrei Vladimirovich Salnikov (Russian: Андрей Владимирович Сальников; born 13 March 1982) is a former Russian professional footballer.
