= Mikhail Solovey =

Russian footballer and coach

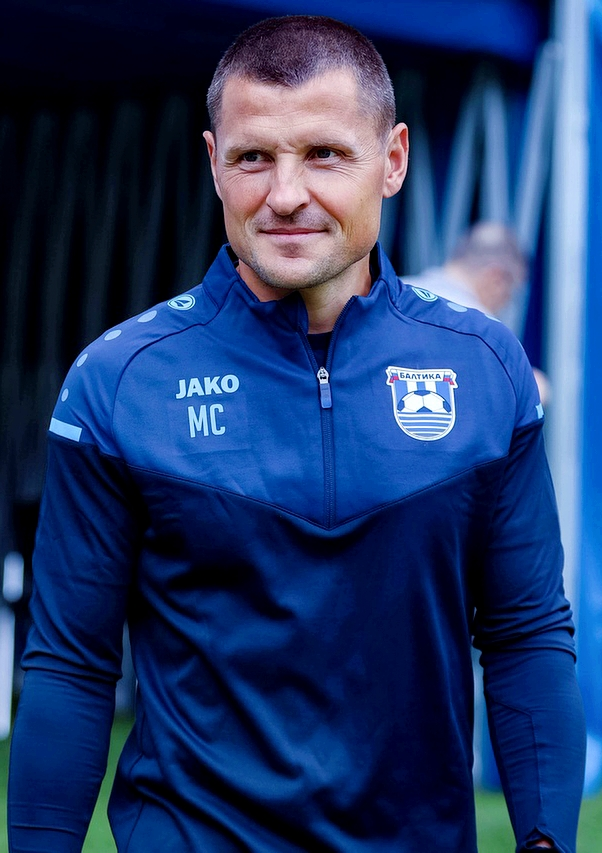
- Solovey in 2022

Personal information
- Full name: Mikhail Aleksandrovich Solovey
- Date of birth: 16 October 1980 (age 46)
- Place of birth: Rybinsk, Yaroslavl Oblast, Russian SFSR
- Height: 1.78 m (5 ft 10 in)
- Position: Defender

Team information
- Current team: FC Shinnik Yaroslavl (conditioning coach)

Senior career*
Years	Team	Apps	(Gls)
2001	FC Rybinsk	0	(0)
2002	FC Neftyanik Yaroslavl	16	(2)
2002–2004	FC Don Novomoskovsk	79	(0)
2005	FC Saturn Yegoryevsk	28	(0)
2006–2007	FC Mordovia Saransk	72	(2)
2008	FC Metallurg-Kuzbass Novokuznetsk	40	(0)
2009	FC Volgar-Gazprom-2 Astrakhan	29	(0)
2010–2011	FC Nizhny Novgorod	57	(1)
2012–2013	FC SKA-Energiya Khabarovsk	32	(0)
2013–2014	FC Luch-Energiya Vladivostok	18	(0)
2015–2016	FC Spartak Kostroma	30	(0)

Managerial career
- 2017–2018: FC Anzhi Makhachkala (conditioning)
- 2019–2020: FC Arsenal Tula (conditioning)
- 2021–2022: FC Khimki (conditioning)
- 2022–2024: FC Baltika Kaliningrad (conditioning)
- 2024–: FC Shinnik Yaroslavl (conditioning)
- * Club domestic league appearances and goals

Mikhail Aleksandrovich Solovey (Russian: Михаил Александрович Соловей; born 16 October 1980) is a Russian professional football coach and a former player. He currently serves as a conditioning coach for FC Shinnik Yaroslavl.

== Club career ==
He played seven seasons in the Russian Football National League for six clubs.
