= Alan Murtazov =

Russian footballer

Personal information
- Full name: Alan Anatolyevich Murtazov
- Date of birth: 26 September 1984 (age 42)
- Place of birth: Ordzhonikidze, Russian SFSR
- Height: 1.74 m (5 ft 8 1/2 in)
- Position: Midfielder

Youth career
- Yunost Vladikavkaz

Senior career*
Years	Team	Apps	(Gls)
2001	FC Alania Vladikavkaz	0	(0)
2004–2007	FC Avtodor Vladikavkaz	75	(0)
2008–2010	FC Zhemchuzhina-Sochi	56	(1)
2010	→ FC Gubkin (loan)	13	(0)
2011–2012	FC Tyumen	16	(0)
2012–2014	FC Amur-2010 Blagoveshchensk	47	(0)
2014–2016	FC Lokomotiv Liski	41	(0)
- * Club domestic league appearances and goals

Alan Anatolyevich Murtazov (Russian: Алан Анатольевич Муртазов; born 26 September 1984) is a former Russian professional football player.

== Club career ==
He played in the Russian Football National League for FC Zhemchuzhina-Sochi in 2010.
