= Sergei Tsukanov =

Russian footballer

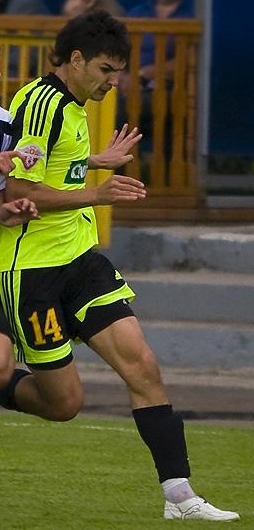

Personal information
- Full name: Sergei Borisovich Tsukanov
- Date of birth: 14 January 1986 (age 40)
- Place of birth: Otradnoye, Voronezh Oblast, Russian SFSR
- Height: 1.90 m (6 ft 3 in)
- Position: Defender

Senior career*
Years	Team	Apps	(Gls)
2004–2005	FC Fakel Voronezh	0	(0)
2006	FC Dynamo Voronezh	32	(5)
2007	FC Lokomotiv Liski	24	(6)
2008	FC Sportakademklub Moscow	29	(2)
2009–2010	FC Krasnodar	31	(1)
2011–2012	FC Torpedo Vladimir	31	(1)
2012–2013	FC Salyut Belgorod	43	(1)
2014	FC Sokol Saratov	2	(0)
2014–2015	FC Baltika Kaliningrad	51	(9)
2016–2017	FC Yenisey Krasnoyarsk	3	(0)
2017	FC Zorky Krasnogorsk	13	(2)
2018	FC Luch-Energiya Vladivostok	6	(0)
2018–2019	FC Syzran-2003	12	(0)
2019–2020	FC Dynamo Bryansk	5	(2)

International career
2008	Russia U-21	1	(0)
- * Club domestic league appearances and goals

Sergei Borisovich Tsukanov (Russian: Серге́й Борисович Цуканов; born 14 January 1986) is a Russian former professional football player.

== Club career ==
He made his Russian Football National League debut for FC Sportakademklub Moscow on 30 March 2008 in a game against FC Zvezda Irkutsk.
