= Maksim Volkov =

Russian footballer

Personal information
- Full name: Maksim Sergeyevich Volkov
- Date of birth: 17 July 1987 (age 39)
- Place of birth: Volgograd, Russian SFSR
- Height: 1.80 m (5 ft 11 in)
- Position: Midfielder

Senior career*
Years	Team	Apps	(Gls)
2002–2007	FC Olimpia Volgograd	84	(21)
2008–2009	FC KAMAZ Naberezhnye Chelny	3	(0)
2008	→ FC Lada Togliatti (loan)	17	(2)
2009	→ FC Dynamo Bryansk (loan)	29	(9)
2010–2012	FC Volgar-Gazprom Astrakhan	70	(9)
2012	FC Ural Sverdlovsk Oblast	2	(0)
2012–2013	→ FC Baltika Kaliningrad (loan)	20	(1)
2013–2014	FC Sokol Saratov	35	(4)
2014–2015	FC Avangard Kursk	18	(2)
2015–2016	FC Baltika Kaliningrad	16	(0)
2016–2017	FC Sakhalin Yuzhno-Sakhalinsk	13	(1)
2017–2018	FC Dynamo Stavropol	30	(5)
2019–2020	FC Akron Tolyatti	9	(0)
2020	FC Krymteplytsia Molodizhne	0	(0)

International career
2006	Russia U-19	5	(1)
- * Club domestic league appearances and goals

Maksim Sergeyevich Volkov (Russian: Максим Серге́евич Волков; born 17 July 1987) is a Russian former professional football player.

== Club career ==
He made his Russian Football National League debut for FC KAMAZ Naberezhnye Chelny on 19 April 2008 in a game against FC Anzhi Makhachkala.
