= Andrei Lozhkin (footballer) =

Russian footballer

Personal information
- Full name: Andrei Viktorovich Lozhkin
- Date of birth: 11 July 1984 (age 42)
- Place of birth: Izhevsk, Udmurtia, Soviet Union
- Height: 1.85 m (6 ft 1 in)
- Position: Defender

Senior career*
Years	Team	Apps	(Gls)
2000	FC Dynamo Izhevsk	3	(0)
2001–2004	FC Gazovik-Gazprom Izhevsk	75	(0)
2005–2010	FC KAMAZ Naberezhnye Chelny	162	(3)
2011	FC Ural Sverdlovsk Oblast	3	(0)
2011	FC KAMAZ Naberezhnye Chelny	14	(2)
2012	FC Chernomorets Novorossiysk	7	(0)
2013	FC Zenit-Izhevsk Izhevsk	8	(0)

International career
2004	Russia U-21	6	(0)
- * Club domestic league appearances and goals

Andrei Viktorovich Lozhkin (Russian: Андрей Викторович Ложкин; born 11 July 1984) is a Russian former professional footballer.

== Club career ==
He made his professional debut in the Russian Second Division in 2000 for FC Dynamo Izhevsk. He made his Russian Football National League debut for FC Gazovik-Gazprom Izhevsk on 19 June 2001 in a game against FC Volgar-Gazprom Astrakhan.
