= Andrei Sidyayev =

Russian footballer

Personal information
- Full name: Andrei Yevgenyevich Sidyayev
- Date of birth: 25 October 1980 (age 45)
- Place of birth: Sterlitamak, Russian SFSR
- Height: 1.86 m (6 ft 1 in)
- Position: Defender

Senior career*
Years	Team	Apps	(Gls)
1997–2006	FC Sodovik Sterlitamak	235	(25)
2007–2009	FC KAMAZ Naberezhnye Chelny	63	(0)
2009	FC Baltika Kaliningrad	12	(0)
2010–2011	FC Volgar-Gazprom Astrakhan	38	(0)
2011–2012	FC Chernomorets Novorossiysk	19	(0)
2012–2013	FC Volga Ulyanovsk	23	(1)
2013–2014	FC Dynamo Bryansk	27	(2)
- * Club domestic league appearances and goals

Andrei Yevgenyevich Sidyayev (Russian: Андрей Евгеньевич Сидяев; born 25 October 1980) is a former Russian professional footballer.

== Club career ==
He played 6 seasons in the Russian Football National League for 5 different teams.
