= Oleg Shelyutov =

Russian footballer

Personal information
- Full name: Oleg Yevgenyevich Shelyutov
- Date of birth: 16 August 1988 (age 38)
- Place of birth: Bryansk, Russian SFSR
- Height: 1.83 m (6 ft 0 in)
- Position: Striker

Youth career
- FC Dynamo Bryansk

Senior career*
Years	Team	Apps	(Gls)
2009–2010	FC Dynamo Bryansk	26	(2)
2012	FC Zvezda Ryazan	4	(0)
2013–2014	FC Dynamo Bryansk	23	(0)
2014	FC Zarya Starodub		
2015	FC Dynamo Bryansk	9	(1)
2015	FC Zarya Starodub		
2016	FC UchKhoz Kokino		
2016–2017	FC Dynamo Bryansk	32	(3)
2018	FC Proletariy Surazh		
- * Club domestic league appearances and goals

Oleg Yevgenyevich Shelyutov (Russian: Олег Евгеньевич Шелютов; born 16 August 1988) is a Russian former professional football player.

== Club career ==
He played in the Russian Football National League for FC Dynamo Bryansk in 2010.

== Personal life ==
He is the younger brother of Yevgeni Shelyutov.
