= Anton Alekseyev =

Ukrainian footballer

Personal information
- Full name: Anton Sergeyevich Alekseyev
- Date of birth: 31 March 1984 (age 42)
- Place of birth: Kharkiv, Ukrainian SSR
- Height: 1.91 m (6 ft 3 in)
- Position: Goalkeeper

Youth career
- –2000: FC Metalist Kharkiv
- 2000–2001: FC Arsenal Kharkiv

Senior career*
Years	Team	Apps	(Gls)
2001–2002	FC Arsenal Kharkiv	0	(0)
2002–2003	FC Spartak Moscow	0	(0)
2005	FC Okean Nakhodka	18	(0)
2006	FC Spartak-Auto Moscow		
2007	FC SKA-Energiya Khabarovsk	9	(0)
2008	FC Olimpia Volgograd	14	(0)
2009	FC Mashuk-KMV Pyatigorsk	11	(0)
2009	FC Krasnodar	0	(0)
2011	FC Politehnica Iași	7	(0)
2012	FC Biolog-Novokubansk Progress	5	(0)
- * Club domestic league appearances and goals

Anton Sergeyevich Alekseyev (Russian: Антон Сергеевич Алексеев; Anton Serhiyovych Alekseyev, Ukrainian: Антон Сергійович Алексєєв; born 31 March 1984) is a retired Ukrainian former professional football goalkeeper.

== Club career ==
He played for the main squad of FC Spartak Moscow in the Russian Premier League Cup.
