= Andrei Pazin =

Russian footballer

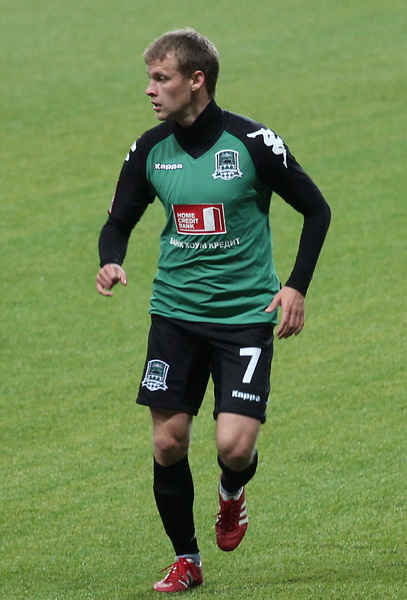
- Pazin with Krasnodar in 2011

Personal information
- Full name: Andrei Sergeyevich Pazin
- Date of birth: 20 January 1986 (age 40)
- Place of birth: Bryansk, Russian SFSR
- Height: 1.75 m (5 ft 9 in)
- Positions: Midfielder; forward

Senior career*
| Years | Team | Apps | (Gls) |
| 2002 | FC Kolomna | 6 | (0) |
| 2004 | FC Titan Moscow | 24 | (2) |
| 2005 | FC Lokomotiv Moscow | 0 | (0) |
| 2006–2007 | FC Lukhovitsy | 54 | (8) |
| 2008–2009 | FC Nosta Novotroitsk | 66 | (10) |
| 2010–2011 | FC Krasnodar | 38 | (6) |
| 2011–2014 | FC Mordovia Saransk | 69 | (4) |
| 2014–2016 | FC Tosno | 43 | (3) |
| 2016–2017 | FC Mordovia Saransk | 12 | (0) |
| 2017–2020 | FC Dynamo Bryansk | 40 | (7) |
| 2021–2022 | FC Krasava Odintsovo | 31 | (2) |
| 2022–2024 | FC Kolomna | 65 | (6) |

International career
| 2004 | Russia U-18 | 6 | (1) |
- * Club domestic league appearances and goals

Andrei Sergeyevich Pazin (Russian: Андрей Серге́евич Пазин; born 20 January 1986) is a Russian former professional football player.

== Club career ==
He made his Russian Premier League debut for FC Mordovia Saransk on 27 July 2012 in a game against FC Kuban Krasnodar.
