= Vladimir Ridel =

Russian footballer

Personal information
- Full name: Vladimir Aleksandrovich Ridel
- Date of birth: 22 June 1985 (age 41)
- Place of birth: Ordzhonikidze, Alania, Soviet Union
- Height: 1.79 m (5 ft 10 in)
- Positions: Defender; midfielder

Senior career*
Years	Team	Apps	(Gls)
2005	FC Avtodor Vladikavkaz	6	(0)
2006–2007	FC Smena Komsomolsk-na-Amure	63	(6)
2008–2011	FC Zhemchuzhina-Sochi	98	(10)
2011–2012	FC Salyut Belgorod	20	(1)
2012–2013	FC Volgar Astrakhan	19	(0)
2013	FC Fakel Voronezh	7	(0)
2013	FC Salyut Belgorod	8	(0)
2014	FC Avangard Kursk	7	(0)
2014–2015	FC Afips Afipsky	18	(0)
2016	FC Chernomorets Novorossiysk	14	(4)
2017	FC Druzhba Maykop	12	(3)
2017–2018	FC Chernomorets Novorossiysk	26	(0)
2019	PFC Dynamo Stavropol	26	(0)
- * Club domestic league appearances and goals

Vladimir Aleksandrovich Ridel (Russian: Владимир Александрович Ридель; born 22 June 1985) is a Russian former professional football player.

== Club career ==
He made his Russian Football National League debut for FC Zhemchuzhina-Sochi on 27 March 2010 in a game against FC Baltika Kaliningrad.
