= Aleksei Bugayev =

Russian footballer (1981–2024)

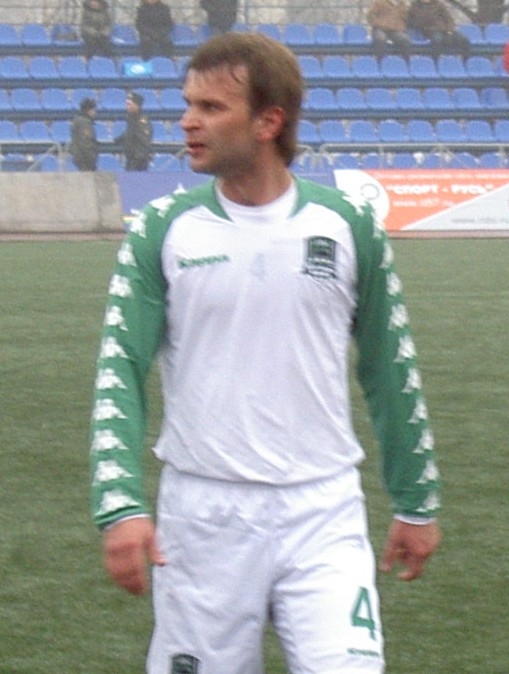
- Bugayev in 2010

Personal information
- Full name: Aleksei Ivanovich Bugayev
- Date of birth: 25 August 1981
- Place of birth: Moscow, Russian SFSR, Soviet Union
- Date of death: 28 December 2024 (aged 43)
- Place of death: Kursk Oblast, Ukrainian-occupied territories
- Height: 1.80 m (5 ft 11 in)
- Position: Defender

Senior career*
Years	Team	Apps	(Gls)
1999–2000	Torpedo-2 Moscow	36	(3)
2001	Torpedo Moscow	2	(0)
2001–2002	Tom Tomsk	34	(1)
2003–2004	Torpedo Moscow	39	(0)
2005–2006	Lokomotiv Moscow	8	(0)
2006–2008	Tom Tomsk	54	(1)
2008	Khimki	0	(0)
2009–2010	Krasnodar	20	(0)
Total		193	(5)

International career
2001–2003	Russia U21	2	(0)
2004–2005	Russia	7	(0)
- * Club domestic league appearances and goals

Aleksei Ivanovich Bugayev (Russian: Алексе́й Ива́нович Буга́ев; 25 August 1981 – 28 December 2024) was a Russian professional footballer who played as a defender.

== Club career ==
Bugayev played for Tom Tomsk, Torpedo Moscow, Lokomotiv Moscow, Khimki, and Krasnodar.

== International career ==
Bugayev made his debut for the Russia national team in 2004, playing 90 minutes in a friendly match against Austria ending in a goalless draw. He was then included in the squad at the UEFA Euro 2004. He was an unused substitute in the 1–0 loss against Spain, but played the full 90 minutes in the 0–2 loss to Portugal and in the 2–1 win against Greece. He earned three more caps in 2006 World Cup qualification, playing 90 minutes in 4–0 wins against both Luxembourg and Estonia and a 1–7 loss against Portugal. His last appearance for Russia was in a friendly against Italy in 2005. He retired from his career in 2010.

== Personal life and death ==
Bugayev had issues with alcohol addiction throughout his adult life and retired from football at the age of 29. He worked for a recycling business after retirement but turned to crime to pay for his alcohol debts.

On 28 October 2023, Bugayev was arrested in Krasnodar in possession of 495 grams of mephedrone. On 24 September 2024, he pled guilty to drug distribution and was sentenced to 9.5 years of imprisonment. While imprisoned, Bugayev sought to enlist in the military to participate in the war against Ukraine.

On 29 December 2024, Bugayev was reported to have been killed in action the previous day. Due to his death in the war zone, his body could not be immediately recovered. According to his family, the correct date of death is 3 December 2024, when he went missing in action after failing to complete his combat task. His funeral took place on 19 January 2025 in an undisclosed location in Voronezh Oblast.

Bugayev was married three times and had two daughters, each from the two previous marriages.

== Honours ==
- Russian Super Cup: 2005
- Russian Premier League third place: 2005
