= Vladimir Leshonok =

Russian footballer

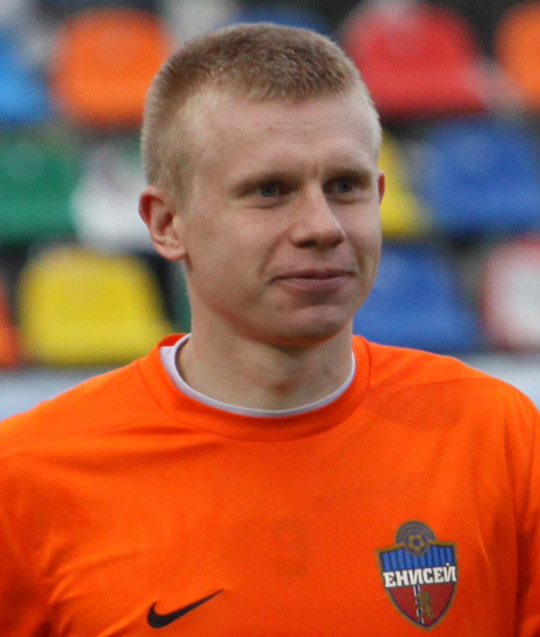
- Leshonok with Yenisey Krasnoyarsk in 2011

Personal information
- Full name: Vladimir Olegovich Leshonok
- Date of birth: 14 August 1984 (age 42)
- Place of birth: Omsk, Russian SFSR
- Height: 1.80 m (5 ft 11 in)
- Position: Left winger

Youth career
- Molniya Omsk

Senior career*
Years	Team	Apps	(Gls)
2003	FC Shinnik Yaroslavl	0	(0)
2003–2006	FC Spartak Moscow	10	(0)
2005	→ FC Spartak Chelyabinsk (loan)	36	(2)
2006	→ FC Salyut-Energia Belgorod (loan)	25	(2)
2007–2008	FC Alania Vladikavkaz	46	(1)
2009–2010	FC Salyut Belgorod	49	(4)
2010	FC Krasnodar	12	(1)
2011–2016	FC Yenisey Krasnoyarsk	141	(20)
2016–2018	FC Tyumen	69	(10)
2019–2020	FC Irtysh Omsk	17	(3)

International career
2003–2005	Russia U-21	11	(0)
- * Club domestic league appearances and goals

Vladimir Olegovich Leshonok (Russian: Владимир Олегович Лешонок; born 14 August 1984) is a Russian former professional footballer.

== Club career ==
He made his debut in the Russian Premier League in 2004 for FC Spartak Moscow. He played 5 games and scored 1 goal in the UEFA Intertoto Cup 2004 for FC Spartak Moscow.
