= Denis Kondakov =

Russian footballer

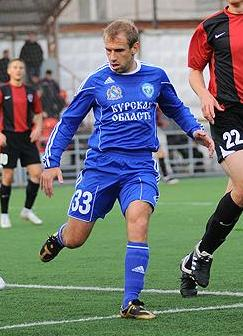

Personal information
- Full name: Denis Aleksandrovich Kondakov
- Date of birth: 29 June 1978 (age 48)
- Height: 1.71 m (5 ft 7 1/2 in)
- Position: Defender

Team information
- Current team: Avangard Kursk (manager)

Senior career*
Years	Team	Apps	(Gls)
1997–2012	Avangard Kursk	428	(3)

Managerial career
- 2012–2023: Avangard Kursk (youth)
- 2023: Avangard Kursk (assistant)
- 2024: Saturn Ramenskoye (assistant)
- 2026–: Avangard Kursk (director of sports)
- 2026–: Avangard Kursk
- * Club domestic league appearances and goals

Denis Aleksandrovich Kondakov (Russian: Денис Александрович Кондаков; born 29 June 1978) is a Russian professional football coach and a former player who is the manager of Avangard Kursk.

== Career ==
He played 4 seasons in the Russian Football National League for FC Avangard Kursk.

== Personal life ==
His son Daniil Kondakov is a professional footballer as well.
