= Maksim Demenko =

Russian footballer and manager

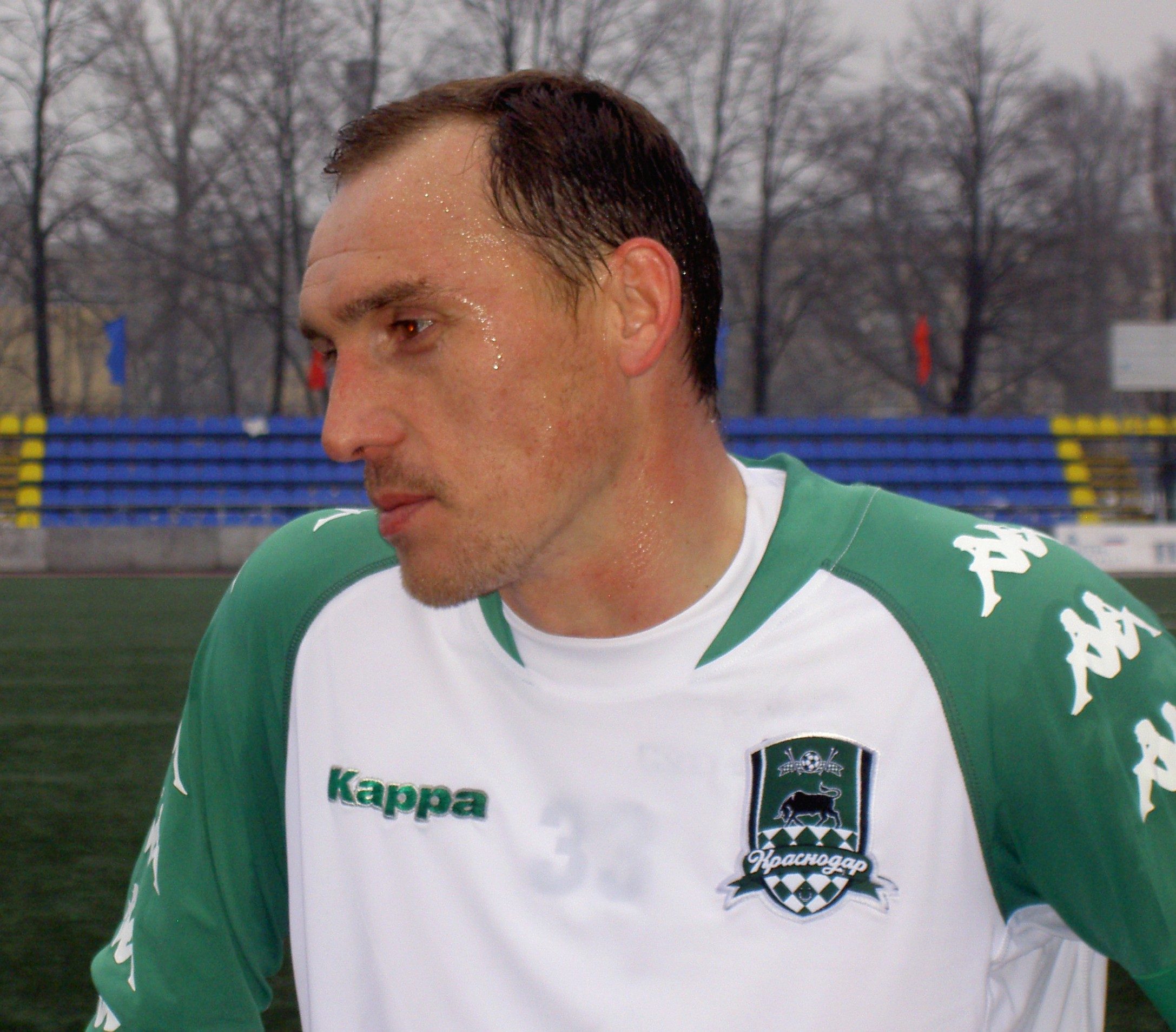
- Demenko with FC Krasnodar in 2010

Personal information
- Full name: Maksim Vladimirovich Demenko
- Date of birth: 21 March 1976 (age 50)
- Place of birth: Krasnodar, Russian SFSR
- Height: 1.91 m (6 ft 3 in)
- Position: Midfielder

Senior career*
Years	Team	Apps	(Gls)
1992–1993	Kuban Krasnodar	30	(2)
1993–1994	Dynamo Kyiv	13	(0)
1994	→ Dynamo-2 Kyiv	2	(0)
1995–1998	Lada Togliatti	110	(9)
1998	Krylia Sovetov Samara	13	(1)
1999	Tsentr-R-Kavkaz Krasnodar (D4)		
1999	Zhemchuzhina Sochi	17	(5)
2000–2001	Zenit Saint Petersburg	44	(10)
2000	→ Zenit-d Saint Petersburg	1	(0)
2002	Rostselmash	20	(4)
2003	Spartak Moscow	19	(0)
2005–2008	FC Dynamo Krasnodar (D4)		
2009–2010	Krasnodar	45	(12)
2010–2011	Zhemchuzhina-Sochi	27	(9)
2012	Chernomorets Novorossiysk	10	(1)

International career
1995	Russia U21	1	(0)
2000	Russia	2	(0)

Managerial career
- 2013: Afips Afipsky
- 2016–2017: FC Sochi (director of sports)
- * Club domestic league appearances and goals

Maksim Vladimirovich Demenko (Russian: Максим Владимирович Деменко; born 21 March 1976) is a Russian football manager and a former player who played as a central midfielder.

He is one of six players who scored for six different teams in the Russian Premier League and the only player who had to take-over in goal when the goalkeeper was sent-off after all the substitutions have been made on two separate occasions (he allowed goals in both games, including a decisive goal for FC Anzhi Makhachkala against FC Zenit in 2000).

== Honours ==
- Ukrainian Premier League winner: 1994
- Russian Cup winner: 2003

== International career ==
Demenko has made his debut for Russia on 26 April 2000 in a friendly against the United States.
