= Kirill Krolevets =

Russian footballer

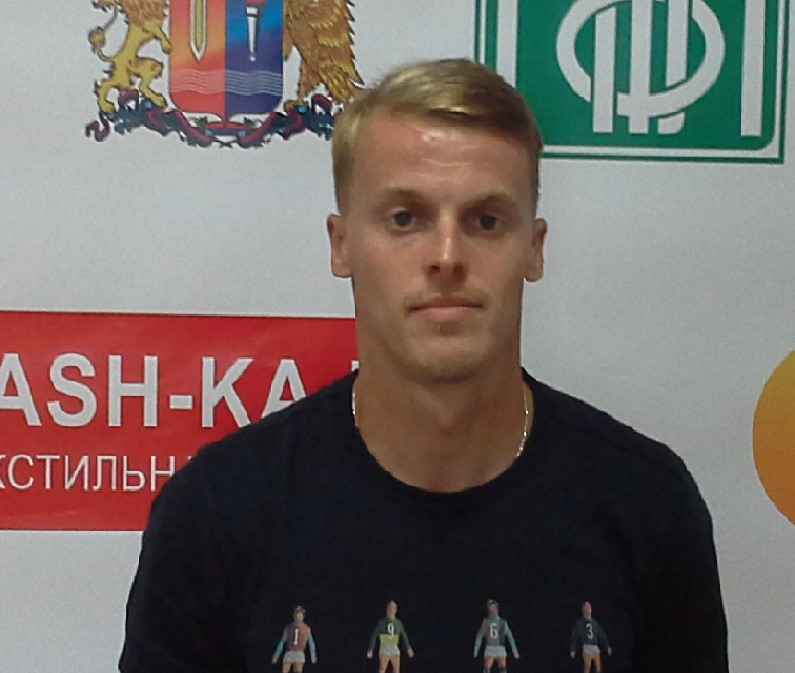

Personal information
- Full name: Kirill Yuryevich Krolevets
- Date of birth: 7 October 1986 (age 40)
- Height: 1.79 m (5 ft 10 in)
- Positions: Midfielder; striker

Youth career
- FC Dynamo Omsk

Senior career*
Years	Team	Apps	(Gls)
2005–2010	FC Irtysh Omsk	144	(14)
2011	FC Khimki	6	(0)
2011–2014	FC Irtysh Omsk	62	(9)
2014	FC Tekstilshchik Ivanovo	16	(1)
2015–2016	FC Irtysh Omsk	28	(5)
2017–2018	FC Rosich Moscow		
- * Club domestic league appearances and goals

Kirill Yuryevich Krolevets (Russian: Кирилл Юрьевич Кролевец; born 7 October 1986) is a Russian former professional football player.

== Club career ==
He played two seasons in the Russian Football National League for FC Irtysh Omsk and FC Khimki.
