= Yevgeni Kaleshin =

Russian footballer and coach

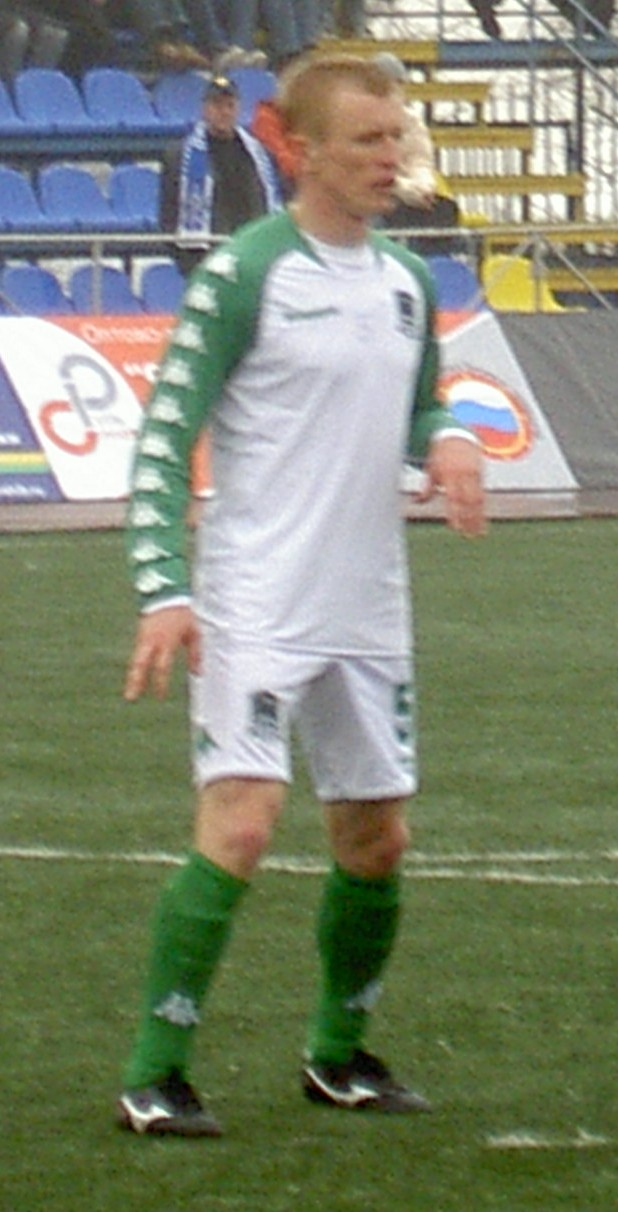
- Kaleshin on 27 March 2010 at match between FC Dynamo Saint Petersburg and FC Krasnodar

Personal information
- Full name: Yevgeni Igorevich Kaleshin
- Date of birth: 20 June 1978 (age 48)
- Place of birth: Maykop, Russian SFSR
- Height: 1.78 m (5 ft 10 in)
- Position: Defender

Youth career
- FC Kuban Krasnodar

Senior career*
Years	Team	Apps	(Gls)
1995	FC Torpedo-GAZ Krasnodar		
1996	FC Izumrud Timashyovsk	31	(5)
1997	FC Druzhba Maykop	3	(0)
1997	FC Spartak Anapa	27	(8)
1998	FC Druzhba Maykop	38	(7)
1999	FC Shinnik Yaroslavl	9	(0)
2000	PFC Spartak Nalchik	32	(2)
2001	FC Volgar-Gazprom Astrakhan	18	(0)
2002–2003	FC Lada Togliatti	59	(2)
2003–2007	FC Tom Tomsk	110	(6)
2007	FC Krylia Sovetov Samara	10	(0)
2008	FC Alania Vladikavkaz	34	(0)
2009–2010	FC Krasnodar	68	(12)
2011–2012	FC Chernomorets Novorossiysk	43	(5)
2012–2013	FC Salyut Belgorod	28	(4)

Managerial career
- 2013–2014: FC Krasnodar (assistant)
- 2014–2015: FC Krasnodar-2 (assistant)
- 2015–2016: FC Kuban Krasnodar (assistant)
- 2016: FC Kuban-2 Krasnodar
- 2016: FC Kuban Krasnodar (caretaker)
- 2016–2017: FC Kuban Krasnodar (assistant)
- 2017–2018: FC Kuban Krasnodar
- 2018: FC Urozhay Krasnodar
- 2019–2021: FC Baltika Kaliningrad
- 2022: FC Tver
- 2022–2023: FC Akron Tolyatti
- 2023–2024: FC Alania Vladikavkaz
- 2024–2025: FC Chayka Peschanokopskoye
- * Club domestic league appearances and goals

Yevgeni Igorevich Kaleshin (Russian: Евгений Игоревич Калешин; born 20 June 1978) is a Russian professional football coach and a former player.

== Club career ==
He made his debut in the Russian Premier League in 1999 for FC Shinnik Yaroslavl.

== Coaching career ==
On 19 July 2018, Yevgeni Kaleshin was named as the head coach of the new FC Urozhay Krasnodar.

== Personal life ==
He is the brother of Vitali Kaleshin and a son of Igor Kaleshin.
