= Ivan Knežević =

Montenegrin footballer (born 1986)

Personal information
- Date of birth: 22 February 1986 (age 40)
- Place of birth: Titograd, Yugoslavia
- Height: 1.94 m (6 ft 4 in)
- Position: Forward

Team information
- Current team: Crvena Stijena

Youth career
- 2000–2004: FK Zeta

Senior career*
Years	Team	Apps	(Gls)
2004–2010	Zeta	90	(28)
2010–2011	Krasnodar	15	(1)
2011–2013	Zeta	32	(5)
2013–2014	Mladost Podgorica	14	(1)
2014	Dacia Chişinău	12	(4)
2014–2015	Mladost Podgorica	14	(9)
2015	OFK Petrovac	14	(2)
2015–2016	Rudar Pljevlja	24	(5)
2016	Ubon UMT United	4	(0)
2017–2018	Mladost Podgorica	24	(1)
2018	Argja Bóltfelag		
2018–2019	Otrant	13	(5)
2019	Mladost Lješkopolje	8	(2)
2019–2020	Dečić	17	(10)
2020–2021	Drezga	18	(3)
2021–2022	Mladost Donja Gorica		
2022–	Crvena Stijena		

International career
2005–2008	Montenegro U21	13	(5)
- * Club domestic league appearances and goals

Ivan Knežević (Cyrillic: Иван Кнежевић; born 22 February 1986) is a Montenegrin professional footballer who plays as a striker for Crvena Stijena.

== Club career ==
In February 2010, Knežević signed a 3.5-year contract with FC Krasnodar.

On 28 January 2018, Knežević the Faroe Islands and joined Argja Bóltfelag. In the summer 2018, he then joined FK Otrant and played there until 18 January 2019, where he signed with Mladost Lješkopolje. Six months later, he signed with FK Dečić.

== Honours ==
Club:

- FK Zeta
  - Montenegrin First League: 2006-07
