= Roman Surnev =

Russian footballer

Personal information
- Full name: Roman Aleksandrovich Surnev
- Date of birth: 7 June 1981 (age 45)
- Place of birth: Stavropol, Russian SFSR
- Height: 1.78 m (5 ft 10 in)
- Position: Midfielder

Senior career*
Years	Team	Apps	(Gls)
1997–2000	FC Dynamo Stavropol	26	(0)
1997	→ FC Dynamo-d Stavropol	28	(2)
2000	FC Interros Stavropol		
2001	FC Nart Cherkessk (amateur)		
2002	FC Nart Cherkessk	21	(7)
2002	FC Dynamo Stavropol	8	(0)
2003–2005	FC Saturn Yegoryevsk	93	(22)
2006–2007	FC Avangard Kursk	63	(7)
2008–2009	FC Salyut-Energia Belgorod	34	(4)
2009–2010	FC Krasnodar	47	(5)
2011–2012	FC Yenisey Krasnoyarsk	50	(2)
2013	FC Zenit Penza	15	(0)
- * Club domestic league appearances and goals

Roman Aleksandrovich Surnev (Russian: Роман Александрович Сурнев; born 7 June 1981) is a former Russian professional football player.

== Club career ==
He played 8 seasons in the Russian Football National League for 5 different clubs.
