= Vladislav Yarkin =

Russian footballer

Personal information
- Full name: Vladislav Dmitriyevich Yarkin
- Date of birth: 16 April 1965 (age 61)
- Place of birth: Barnaul, Russian SFSR
- Height: 1.70 m (5 ft 7 in)
- Position: Forward

Youth career
- FC Dynamo Barnaul

Senior career*
Years	Team	Apps	(Gls)
1982–1988	FC Dynamo Barnaul	112	(42)
1989	FC Pamir Dushanbe	2	(0)
1989–1991	FC Dynamo Barnaul	110	(42)
1992	FC Kuzbass Kemerovo	15	(13)
1992–1993	FC Dynamo-Gazovik Tyumen	42	(10)
1994	FC Irtysh Tobolsk	10	(2)
1995–1997	FC Zarya Leninsk-Kuznetsky	95	(27)
1998–1999	FC Dynamo Barnaul	27	(9)
1999–2000	FC Metallurg Novokuznetsk	36	(8)
- * Club domestic league appearances and goals

Vladislav Dmitriyevich Yarkin (Russian: Владислав Дмитриевич Яркин; born 16 April 1965) is a former Russian football player.

His brother Aleksandr and his sons Aleksandr Yarkin and Artyom Yarkin are all professional footballers.
