= Andrei Mikheyev =

Russian footballer (born 1987)

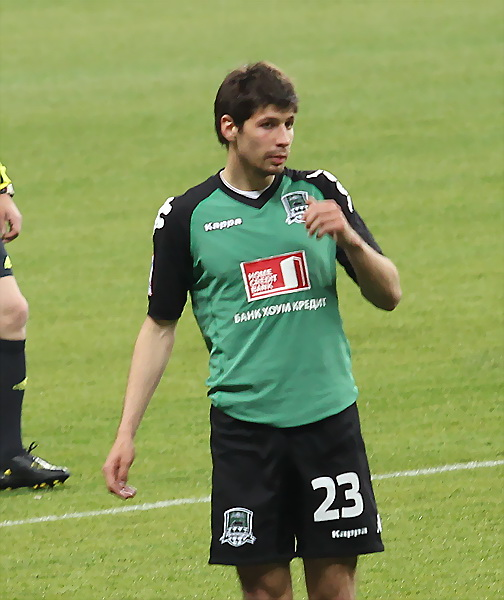

Personal information
- Full name: Andrei Vasilyevich Mikheyev
- Date of birth: 1 July 1987 (age 39)
- Place of birth: Rostov-on-Don, Russian SFSR
- Height: 1.81 m (5 ft 11 in)
- Position: Midfielder

Senior career*
Years	Team	Apps	(Gls)
2006	FC Vityaz Podolsk	23	(4)
2007	FC Saturn Moscow Oblast	0	(0)
2008	FC Taganrog	33	(9)
2009–2012	FC Krasnodar	86	(15)
2012–2013	FC Ufa	10	(0)
2013	FC Salyut Belgorod	20	(5)
2014	FC Rotor Volgograd	7	(0)
2014	FC Sakhalin Yuzhno-Sakhalinsk	5	(0)
2015–2016	FC Torpedo Armavir	36	(4)
2016–2018	FC Chayka Peschanokopskoye	46	(10)

International career
2006	Russia U-19	2	(0)
2011	Russia-2	1	(0)
- * Club domestic league appearances and goals

Andrei Vasilyevich Mikheyev (Russian: Андрей Васильевич Михеев; born 1 July 1987) is a Russian former professional football player.
