= Dmitry Loshkaryov =

Russian footballer

Personal information
- Full name: Dmitry Gennadyevich Loshkaryov
- Date of birth: 26 March 1987 (age 39)
- Place of birth: Volokolamsk, Moscow Oblast, Russian SFSR
- Height: 1.77 m (5 ft 10 in)
- Position: Midfielder

Youth career
- PFC CSKA Moscow

Senior career*
Years	Team	Apps	(Gls)
2004–2006	FC Saturn Ramenskoye	0	(0)
2006	FC Oryol	21	(0)
2007	FC Sodovik Sterlitamak	14	(1)
2008	FC Istra	34	(2)
2009	FC Krasnodar	17	(0)
2010	FC Sportakademklub Moscow	4	(0)
2011	FC Metallurg-Oskol Stary Oskol	9	(1)
2012	FC Volokolamsk		
2012	FC Metallurg-Oskol Stary Oskol	18	(2)
2013–2019	FC Volokolamsk		
- * Club domestic league appearances and goals

Dmitry Gennadyevich Loshkaryov (Russian: Дми́трий Генна́дьевич Лошкарёв; born 26 March 1987) is a Russian former professional association football player.

== Club career ==
He played 3 seasons in the Russian Football National League for FC Oryol, FC Sodovik Sterlitamak and FC Krasnodar.
