= Aleksandr Khlebnikov =

Russian footballer

Personal information
- Full name: Aleksandr Sergeyevich Khlebnikov
- Date of birth: 26 September 1984 (age 42)
- Height: 1.80 m (5 ft 11 in)
- Positions: Defender; midfielder

Youth career
- PFC CSKA Moscow

Senior career*
Years	Team	Apps	(Gls)
2005	FC Spartak Lukhovitsy	10	(0)
2006	FC Vityaz Podolsk	17	(0)
2006	FC Dynamo Vologda	9	(0)
2007	FC Zelenograd	28	(3)
2008	FC Dynamo Bryansk	31	(2)
2009	FC Volgar-Gazprom Astrakhan	20	(1)
2010	FC Luch-Energiya Vladivostok	20	(0)
2011–2012	FC Tyumen	1	(0)
- * Club domestic league appearances and goals

Aleksandr Sergeyevich Khlebnikov (Russian: Александр Серге́евич Хлебников; born 26 September 1984) is a former Russian professional football player.

== Club career ==
He played 3 seasons in the Russian Football National League for FC Dynamo Bryansk, FC Volgar-Gazprom Astrakhan and FC Luch-Energiya Vladivostok.
