= Pavel Dorokhin =

Russian footballer

Personal information
- Full name: Pavel Sergeyevich Dorokhin
- Date of birth: 18 September 1984 (age 42)
- Place of birth: Voronezh, Russian SFSR
- Height: 1.77 m (5 ft 10 in)
- Position: Midfielder

Senior career*
Years	Team	Apps	(Gls)
2001–2004	FC Krasnodar-2000	71	(11)
2004	FC Lada Togliatti	15	(3)
2005	FC Krasnodar-2000	12	(1)
2005	FC Dynamo Makhachkala	8	(0)
2006–2007	FC Baltika Kaliningrad	62	(3)
2008	FC Salyut-Energia Belgorod	15	(1)
2008	FC Dynamo-Voronezh Voronezh	11	(1)
2009–2011	FC Mordovia Saransk	63	(4)
2011–2012	FC Ufa	7	(0)
2012–2013	FC Lokomotiv Liski	6	(1)
2013	FC Taganrog	6	(0)
- * Club domestic league appearances and goals

Pavel Sergeyevich Dorokhin (Russian: Павел Серге́евич Дорохин; born 18 September 1984) is a former Russian professional football player.

== Club career ==
He played six seasons in the Russian Football National League for four different teams.
