= Nikolay Markov (footballer) =

Russian footballer

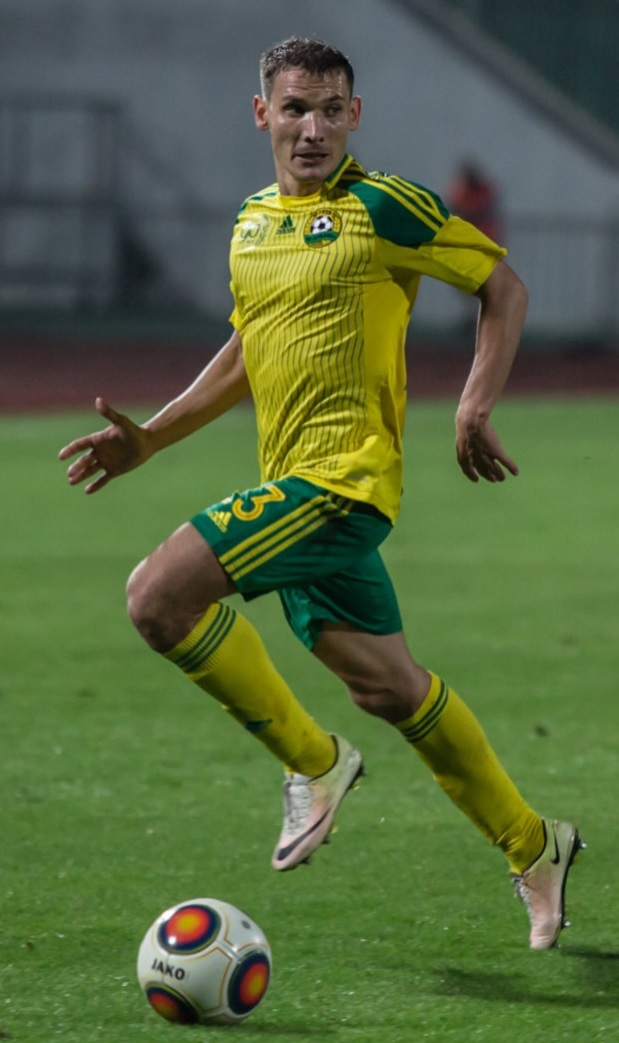
- Markov with Kuban Krasnodar in 2017

Personal information
- Full name: Nikolay Valeryevich Markov
- Date of birth: 20 April 1985 (age 41)
- Place of birth: Tashkent, Uzbek SSR, Soviet Union
- Height: 1.78 m (5 ft 10 in)
- Position: Defender

Youth career
- RUOR im. Titova Tashkent

Senior career*
Years	Team	Apps	(Gls)
2002–2003	Traktor Tashkent	7	(0)
2005–2006	Rubin-2 Kazan	59	(14)
2007	Metallurg Lipetsk	15	(1)
2008	Lukhovitsy	12	(2)
2008–2009	Salyut-Energia Belgorod	49	(9)
2010–2016	Krasnodar	81	(1)
2015	→ Ural Yekaterinburg (loan)	12	(0)
2015–2016	→ Krasnodar-2	7	(3)
2016–2018	Kuban Krasnodar	52	(5)
2018–2020	Krasnodar	3	(0)
2018–2020	→ Krasnodar-2	43	(1)
2020–2024	Yenisey Krasnoyarsk	88	(6)
- * Club domestic league appearances and goals

Nikolay Valeryevich Markov (Russian: Николай Валерьевич Марков; born 20 April 1985) is a Russian former professional association football player.

== Career ==
In December 2009, Markov signed a 2-year contract with Krasnodar. He made his Russian Premier League debut for Krasnodar on 14 May 2011 in a game against Tom Tomsk.

On 28 February 2015, Markov moved to Ural Yekaterinburg for the rest of the season.

== Career statistics ==
As of 25 May 2024

Club	Season	League			Cup		Continental		Other		Total	
Club	Season	Division	Apps	Goals	Apps	Goals	Apps	Goals	Apps	Goals	Apps	Goals
Traktor Tashkent	2002	Uzbekistan Super League	2	0	–		–		–		2	0
Traktor Tashkent	2003	Uzbekistan Super League	5	0	–		–		–		5	0
Traktor Tashkent	Total		7	0	0	0	0	0	0	0	7	0
Rubin-2 Kazan	2005	Russian Second League	34	7	2	0	–		–		36	7
Rubin-2 Kazan	2006	Russian Second League	25	7	1	0	–		–		26	7
Rubin-2 Kazan	Total		59	14	3	0	0	0	0	0	62	14
Metallurg Lipetsk	2007	Russian Second League	15	1	0	0	–		–		15	1
Lukhovitsy	2008	Russian Second League	12	2	3	1	–		–		15	3
Salyut-Energia Belgorod	2008	Russian First League	14	3	0	0	–		–		14	3
Salyut-Energia Belgorod	2009	Russian First League	35	6	2	1	–		–		37	7
Salyut-Energia Belgorod	Total		49	9	2	1	0	0	0	0	51	10
Krasnodar	2010	Russian First League	32	0	–		–		–		32	0
Krasnodar	2011–12	Russian Premier League	18	1	1	0	–		–		19	1
Krasnodar	2012–13	Russian Premier League	13	0	2	1	–		–		15	1
Krasnodar	2013–14	Russian Premier League	11	0	1	0	–		–		12	0
Krasnodar	2014–15	Russian Premier League	0	0	0	0	2 (Note: Appearances in the UEFA Europa League)	0	–		2	0
Krasnodar	2015–16	Russian Premier League	7	0	3	0	1	0	–		11	0
Krasnodar	Total		81	1	7	1	3	0	0	0	91	2
Ural Yekaterinburg (loan)	2014–15	Russian Premier League	12	0	–		–		2 (Note: Appearances in the relegation play-offs)	0	14	0
Krasnodar-2	2015–16	Russian Second League	7	3	–		–		–		7	3
Kuban Krasnodar	2016–17	Russian First League	18	2	0	0	–		5 (Note: Appearances in the FNL Cup)	0	23	2
Kuban Krasnodar	2017–18	Russian First League	34	3	1	0	–		–		35	3
Kuban Krasnodar	Total		52	5	1	0	0	0	5	0	58	5
Krasnodar	2018–19	Russian Premier League	3	0	2	1	0	0	–		5	1
Krasnodar	2019–20	Russian Premier League	0	0	0	0	0	0	–		0	0
Krasnodar	Total		3	0	2	1	0	0	0	0	5	1
Krasnodar-2	2018–19	Russian First League	21	0	–		–		–		21	0
Krasnodar-2	2019–20	Russian First League	22	1	–		–		–		22	1
Krasnodar-2	Total		43	1	0	0	0	0	0	0	43	2
Yenisey Krasnoyarsk	2020–21	Russian First League	26	2	3	0	–		–		29	2
Yenisey Krasnoyarsk	2021–22	Russian First League	26	3	1	0	–		–		27	3
Yenisey Krasnoyarsk	2022–23	Russian First League	17	0	1	0	–		2 (Note: Appearances in the promotion play-offs)	0	20	0
Yenisey Krasnoyarsk	2023–24	Russian First League	19	1	1	0	–		–		20	1
Yenisey Krasnoyarsk	Total		88	6	6	0	0	0	2	0	96	6
Career total			428	42	24	4	3	0	9	0	464	46
