= Roman Loktionov (footballer, born 1985) =

Russian footballer

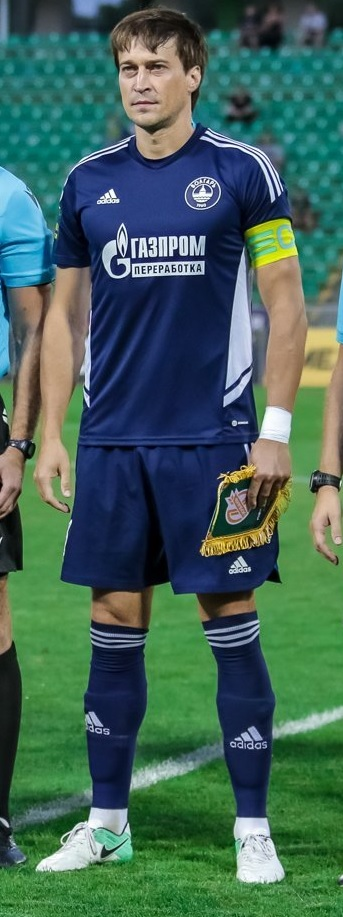
- Loktionov with FC Volgar Astrakhan in 2022

Personal information
- Full name: Roman Gennadyevich Loktionov
- Date of birth: 19 June 1985 (age 41)
- Place of birth: Maykop, Russian SFSR
- Height: 1.89 m (6 ft 2 1/2 in)
- Position: Defender

Senior career*
Years	Team	Apps	(Gls)
2005–2006	FC Olimpia Volgograd	10	(0)
2008–2014	FC Volgar Astrakhan	140	(11)
2015	FC Volgar Astrakhan	0	(0)
2015–2016	FC Tyumen	49	(0)
2017	FC Sochi	10	(0)
2017–2018	FC Zorky Krasnogorsk	22	(1)
2018–2023	FC Volgar Astrakhan	122	(18)
- * Club domestic league appearances and goals

Roman Gennadyevich Loktionov (Russian: Роман Геннадьевич Локтионов; born 19 June 1985) is a Russian former professional football player.

== Club career ==
He made his Russian Football National League debut for FC Volgar-Gazprom Astrakhan on 30 April 2009 in a game against FC Chernomorets Novorossiysk.
