= Aleksandr Oleinik =

Russian footballer

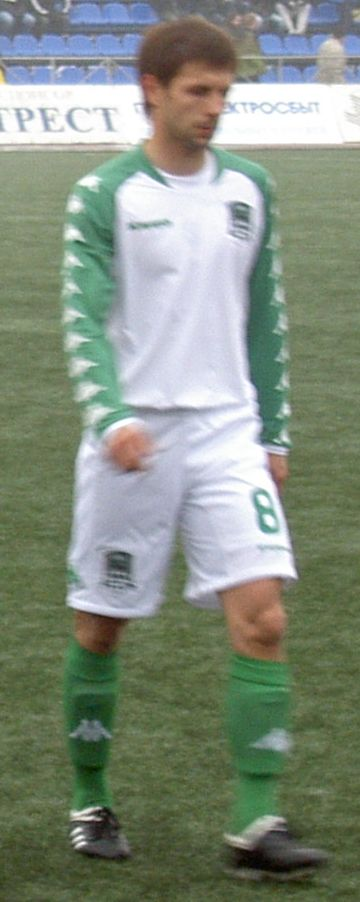

Personal information
- Full name: Aleksandr Aleksandrovich Oleinik
- Date of birth: 1 January 1982 (age 44)
- Height: 1.69 m (5 ft 6 1/2 in)
- Position: Midfielder

Youth career
- FC Kuban Krasnodar

Senior career*
Years	Team	Apps	(Gls)
2000	FC Kuban Krasnodar	25	(3)
2001–2002	FC Chernomorets Novorossiysk	39	(3)
2002–2003	FC Kuban Krasnodar	39	(6)
2004	FC Chernomorets Novorossiysk	38	(6)
2005	FC Kuban Krasnodar	14	(0)
2006	FC Volgar-Gazprom Astrakhan	28	(6)
2007–2008	FC Nosta Novotroitsk	54	(5)
2009–2010	FC Krasnodar	66	(2)
2011	FC Gazovik Orenburg	15	(1)
2011–2012	FC Chernomorets Novorossiysk	10	(0)
- * Club domestic league appearances and goals

Aleksandr Aleksandrovich Oleinik (Russian: Александр Александрович Олейник; born 1 January 1982) is a former Russian professional footballer.

== Club career ==
He made his debut in the Russian Premier League in 2001 for FC Chernomorets Novorossiysk. He played 2 games in the UEFA Cup 2001–02 for FC Chernomorets Novorossiysk.
