= Azim Fatullayev =

Russian professional football player

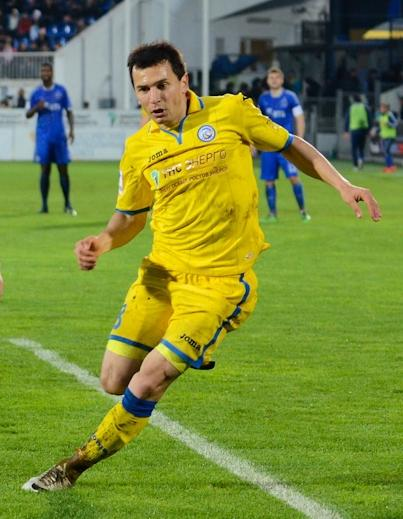
- Fatullayev with Rostov in 2014

Personal information
- Full name: Azim Ikzamudinovich Fatullayev
- Date of birth: 7 June 1986 (age 40)
- Place of birth: Makhachkala, Russian SFSR
- Height: 1.81 m (5 ft 11 in)
- Position: Midfielder

Senior career*
Years	Team	Apps	(Gls)
2004–2005	FC Anzhi Makhachkala	14	(0)
2007	FC Sudostroitel Astrakhan	12	(3)
2008–2012	FC Krasnodar	73	(6)
2011–2012	→ FC Yenisey Krasnoyarsk (loan)	42	(3)
2012–2013	FC Yenisey Krasnoyarsk	29	(0)
2013–2015	FC Rostov	25	(0)
2015	→ FC Tosno (loan)	11	(0)
2015–2019	FC Yenisey Krasnoyarsk	86	(1)
2019	→ FC Rotor Volgograd (loan)	11	(0)
2019–2020	FC Rotor Volgograd	22	(0)
2020	FC Kuban Krasnodar	5	(0)
- * Club domestic league appearances and goals

Azim Ikzamudinovich Fatullayev (Russian: Азим Икзамудинович Фатуллаев; born 7 June 1986) is a Russian former professional football player. He played as a defensive midfielder or centre back.

== Club career ==
He made his Russian Premier League debut for FC Rostov on 2 August 2013 in a game against FC Anzhi Makhachkala.

On 19 February 2019, he joined FC Rotor Volgograd on loan until the end of the 2018–19 season.

On 28 May 2019, he re-signed with Rotor as a free agent.
