= Aleksandr Perov (footballer) =

Russian footballer and coach (born 1978)

Personal information
- Full name: Aleksandr Vladimirovich Perov
- Date of birth: 9 July 1978 (age 48)
- Place of birth: Krasnodar, Russian SFSR
- Height: 1.89 m (6 ft 2 1/2 in)
- Position: Goalkeeper

Team information
- Current team: FC Kuban-2 Krasnodar (goalkeeping coach)

Youth career
- FC Kuban Krasnodar

Senior career*
Years	Team	Apps	(Gls)
1995–2005	FC Kuban Krasnodar	79	(0)
2006	FC Salyut-Energia Belgorod	17	(0)
2007	FC Chernomorets Novorossiysk	6	(0)
2008	FC Mashuk-KMV Pyatigorsk	22	(0)
2009–2010	FC Krasnodar	4	(0)

Managerial career
- 2012–2016: FC Torpedo Armavir (GK coach)
- 2016–: FC Kuban-2 Krasnodar (GK coach)
- * Club domestic league appearances and goals

Aleksandr Vladimirovich Perov (Russian: Александр Владимирович Перов; born 9 July 1978) is a Russian professional football coach and a former player who works as a goalkeeping coach with FC Kuban-2 Krasnodar.

He made his debut in the Russian Premier League in 2004 for FC Kuban Krasnodar.
