= Aleksandr Yarkin (footballer, born 1969) =

Russian footballer and coach

Personal information
- Full name: Aleksandr Dmitriyevich Yarkin
- Date of birth: 12 March 1969 (age 57)
- Place of birth: Barnaul, Russian SFSR
- Height: 1.79 m (5 ft 10 1/2 in)
- Positions: Defender; forward

Youth career
- FC Dynamo Barnaul

Senior career*
Years	Team	Apps	(Gls)
1987–1988	FC Dynamo Barnaul	33	(6)
1989–1990	Dzhezkazganets Dzhezkazgan	23	(5)
1991	FC Pakhtakor Tashkent	10	(0)
1991	FC Dynamo Barnaul	19	(0)
1992	FC Kuzbass Kemerovo	15	(1)
1992–1993	FC Dynamo-Gazovik Tyumen	37	(1)
1994	FC Irtysh Tobolsk	8	(0)
1995–1997	FC Viktoriya Nazarovo	91	(31)
1998	FC Chkalovets Novosibirsk	24	(3)
1999–2001	FC Dynamo Barnaul	52	(11)
2002	FC Metallurg-ZapSib Novokuznetsk	10	(0)
2002	FC Sibiryak Bratsk	0	(0)

Managerial career
- 1996: FC Viktoriya Nazarovo (assistant)
- 2007–2008: FC Dynamo Barnaul (director of sports)
- 2012: FC Irtysh Omsk (assistant)
- 2013–2015: FC Biysk
- * Club domestic league appearances and goals

Aleksandr Dmitriyevich Yarkin (Russian: Александр Дмитриевич Яркин; born 12 March 1969) is a Russian professional football coach and a former player.

== Personal life ==
His brother Vladislav Yarkin was also a professional footballer. Vladislav's sons (and Aleksandr's nephews) Aleksandr Yarkin and Artyom Yarkin are footballers as well.

== Honours ==
- Russian Second Division Zone East top scorer: 1997 (21 goals).
