= Aleksandr Yarkin (footballer, born 1986) =

Russian footballer

Personal information
- Full name: Aleksandr Vladislavovich Yarkin
- Date of birth: 29 December 1986 (age 39)
- Place of birth: Barnaul, Russian SFSR
- Height: 1.81 m (5 ft 11 in)
- Position: Forward

Youth career
- FC Dynamo Barnaul

Senior career*
Years	Team	Apps	(Gls)
2004–2005	FC Dynamo Barnaul	44	(16)
2006–2009	FC Rubin Kazan	15	(2)
2007–2008	→ FC SKA-Energiya Khabarovsk (loan)	51	(25)
2009	→ FC Alania Vladikavkaz (loan)	34	(3)
2010–2012	FC Krasnodar	25	(5)
2011–2012	→ FC SKA-Energiya Khabarovsk (loan)	35	(5)
2012	FC Dynamo Barnaul	17	(7)
2013	FC Salyut Belgorod	25	(1)
2014–2015	FC Metallurg Novokuznetsk	24	(5)
2015–2016	FC Sakhalin Yuzhno-Sakhalinsk	22	(7)
2016–2017	FC Chita	12	(1)

International career
2007	Russia U-21	2	(0)
- * Club domestic league appearances and goals

Aleksandr Vladislavovich Yarkin (Russian: Александр Владиславович Яркин; born 29 December 1986) is a Russian former professional footballer.

== Club career ==
He made his debut in Russian Premier League in 2006 for FC Rubin Kazan. He played for FC Rubin Kazan in UEFA Cup 2006–07 (1 game) and UEFA Intertoto Cup 2007 (2 games).

== Personal life ==
His father Vladislav Yarkin, his uncle Aleksandr and his younger brother Artyom Yarkin are all professional footballers.
