= FC Alnas Almetyevsk =

- Full name: Football Club Alnas Almetyevsk
- Founded: 1967
- Dissolved: 2009
- League: Russian Second Division, Zone Ural-Povolzhye
- 2008: 13th

FC Alnas Almetyevsk (Russian: «Алнас» (Альметьевск)) was a Russian football team from Almetyevsk. It played professionally from 1967 to 1970, in 1993 and from 2001 to 2008. Their best result was 4th place in Zone Ural-Povolzhye in the Russian Second Division in 2006.

== Team name history ==
- 1967–1970: FC Burovik Almetyevsk
- 1993–1994: FC Elektron Almetyevsk
- 1995–1999: FC Devon Almetyevsk
- 2000–2008: FC Alnas Almetyevsk
