= Keisuke =

- Gender: Male

Origin
- Origin: Japanese
- Meaning: Different meanings depending on the kanji used

Keisuke (written: 京佑, 圭佑, 惠佑, 佳祐, 慶祐, 圭祐, 敬佑, 馨祐, 敬輔, 恵輔, 圭輔, 敬典, 恵介, 啓介, 啓祐, 啓輔, 啓左 慶介, 健介, 敬介, 圭介, 銈介, 敬介, 敬助, 蛍介, 景介 or 圭亮) is a masculine Japanese given name. Notable people with the name include:

- Keisuke Endo (遠藤 敬佑; born 1989), Japanese footballer
- Keisuke Fujie (藤江 恵輔; 1885–1969), Japanese general
- Keisuke Fujiwara (藤原 敬典; born 1982), Japanese mixed martial artist
- Keisuke Funatani (船谷 圭祐; born 1986), Japanese footballer
- Keisuke Hada (羽田 敬介; born 1978), Japanese footballer
- Keisuke Hayasaka (早坂 圭介; born 1984), Japanese baseball player
- Keisuke Hayashi (林 佳祐; born 1988), Japanese footballer
- Keisuke Hoashi (born 1967), American actor
- Keisuke Honda (本田 圭佑; born 1986), Japanese footballer
- Keisuke Ishida (石田 圭祐; born 1955), Japanese actor and voice actor
- Keisuke Itagaki (板垣 恵介; born 1957), Japanese manga artist
- Itai Keisuke (板井 圭介; born 1956), Japanese sumo wrestler
- Keisuke Ito (伊藤 圭介; 1803–1901), Japanese physician and biologist
- Keisuke Ito (swimmer) (伊藤 圭祐; 1943–2006), Japanese swimmer
- Keisuke Iwashita (岩下 敬輔; born 1986), Japanese footballer
- Keisuke Izumi (泉 圭輔; born 1997), Japanese baseball player
- Keisuke Kaneko (金子 圭輔; born 1985), Japanese baseball player
- Keisuke Kato (加藤 慶祐; born 1988), Japanese actor
- Keisuke Katto (甲藤 啓介; born 1983), Japanese baseball player
- Keisuke Kihara (木原 敬介; born 1939), Japanese politician
- Keisuke Kimoto (木本 敬介; born 1984), Japanese footballer
- Keisuke Kinoshita (木下 恵介; 1912–1998), Japanese film director
- Keisuke Koide (小出 恵介; born 1984), Japanese actor
- Keisuke Kumakiri (熊切 圭介; born 1934), Japanese photographer
- Keisuke Kunimoto (国本 京佑; born 1989), Japanese-Korean racing driver
- Keisuke Kurihara (栗原 圭介; born 1973), Japanese footballer
- Keisuke Kurokawa (黒川 圭介; born 1997), Japanese footballer
- Keisuke Kuwata (桑田 佳祐; born 1956), Japanese musician and singer-songwriter
- Keisuke Makino (born 1969), Japanese footballer
- Keisuke Matsumoto (松本 圭介; born 1988), Japanese footballer
- Keisuke Minami (南 圭介; born 1985), Japanese actor and singer
- Keisuke Mori (森 惠佑; born 1980), Japanese footballer
- Keisuke Moriya (森谷 佳祐; born 1986), Japanese footballer
- Keisuke Murai (村井 啓介; born 1973), Japanese rower
- Keisuke Naito (内藤 圭佑; born 1987), Japanese footballer
- Keisuke Ogawa (小川 啓介; born 1986), Japanese footballer
- Keisuke Ogihara (荻原 イルマリ 恵介; born 1975), Japanese musician
- Keisuke Okada (岡田 啓介; 1868–1952), Japanese admiral, politician and Prime Minister of Japan
- Keisuke Okuno (奥野 景介; born 1965), Japanese swimmer
- Keisuke Osako (大迫 敬介; born 1999), Japanese footballer
- Keisuke Ota (太田 恵介; born 1979), Japanese footballer
- Keisuke Ota (footballer born 1981) (太田 圭輔), Japanese footballer
- Ōtori Keisuke (大鳥 圭介; 1833–1911), Japanese military commander
- Keisuke Saka (坂 圭祐; born 1995), Japanese footballer
- Keisuke Satsuki (皐月 啓左; born 1941), Japanese water polo player
- Keisuke Sawaki (born 1943), Japanese long-distance runner
- Keisuke Sekiguchi (関口 圭亮; born 1986), Japanese footballer
- Keisuke Serizawa (芹沢 銈介; 1895–1984), Japanese textile designer
- Keisuke Shimizu (清水 圭介; born 1988), Japanese footballer
- Keisuke Suzuki (鈴木 馨祐; born 1977), Japanese politician
- Keisuke Tanimoto (谷元 圭介; born 1985), Japanese baseball player
- Keisuke Tsuboi (坪井 慶介; born 1979), Japanese footballer
- Keisuke Tsumura (津村 啓介; born 1971), Japanese politician
- Keisuke Tsunoda (角田 啓輔), Japanese table tennis player
- Keisuke Ueda (植田 圭輔; born 1989), Japanese actor
- Keisuke Ushiro (右代 啓祐; born 1986), Japanese decathlete
- Yamanami Keisuke (山南 敬助; 1833–1865), Japanese samurai
- Keisuke Yoshida (director) (吉田 恵輔; born 1975), Japanese film director and screenwriter
- Keisuke Yoshida (swimmer) (吉田 啓祐; born 2000), Japanese swimmer

== Fictional characters ==
- Keisuke Amasawa (天沢 ケイスケ), a main character in the video game Digimon Story: Cyber Sleuth – Hacker's Memory
- Keisuke Harukaze (春風渓介), the father of the title character in the anime series Ojamajo Doremi
- Keisuke Hamago (浜瑚 蛍介), a character in the webtoon series Nar Doma
- Keisuke Hiraga (平賀 慶介), a character in the video game Persona 3
- Keisuke Itonokogiri (糸鋸 圭介), a character in the video game Ace Attorney
- Keisuke Miyagi (宮城 健介), a character in The Karate Kid series
- Keisuke Baji (場地 圭介), a character in Tokyo Revengers, who is the first division captain of Tokyo Manji Gang
- Keisuke Takahashi (高橋啓介), a character in the manga and anime series Initial D

== See also ==
- Keisuke (puzzle), a logic puzzle
