= Kihara =

Kihara may refer to:

- Kihara (surname)
- Kihara, Kenya, settlement in Kenya
- Kihara clan (木原一族), a scientist family in A Certain Magical Index novel series and its derived works.
- 4795 Kihara
- Kihara Aikido, martial art
