= Kumakiri =

Kumakiri (written: 熊切) is a Japanese surname. Notable people with the surname include:

- Kazuyoshi Kumakiri (熊切 和嘉; born 1974), Japanese film director
- Keisuke Kumakiri (熊切 圭介; 1934–2020), Japanese photographer

== See also ==
- 7472 Kumakiri, a main-belt asteroid
