= 2013–14 PFC CSKA Moscow season =

PFC CSKA Moscow
2013–14 season
- Chairman: Yevgeni Giner
- Manager: Leonid Slutsky
- Stadium: Arena Khimki
- Premier League: 1st
- Russian Cup: Semi-finals
- Super Cup: Winners
- Champions League: Group stage
- Top goalscorer: League: Seydou Doumbia (18); All: Seydou Doumbia (20)
- Highest home attendance: 18,100 vs Lokomotiv Moscow; 15 May 2014
- Lowest home attendance: 4,000 vs Volga Nizhny Novgorod; 31 March 2014
- Average home league attendance: 9,352
Home colours	Away colours

The 2013–14 PFC CSKA Moscow season was the 22nd successive season the club will play in the Russian Premier League, the highest tier of football in Russia. CSKA successfully defended their Russian Premier League while also winning the Russian Super Cup. They reached the semi-finals of the Russian Cup, where they were defeated by Krasnodar, and they were eliminated from the UEFA Champions League at the group stage.

== Season events ==
On 1 February 2014, CSKA announced goalkeeper Igor Akinfeev had signed a new contract lasting until the summer of 2019.

== Squad ==
As of match played 15 May 2014

Number	Name	Nationality	Position	Date of birth (age)	Signed from	Signed in	Contract ends	Apps.	Goals
Goalkeepers
1	Sergei Chepchugov	(Russia)	GK	15 July 1985 (aged 28)	Sibir Novosibirsk	2010		22	0
16	Sergei Revyakin	(Russia)	GK	2 April 1995 (aged 19)	Academy	2008		2	0
35	Igor Akinfeev (captain)	(Russia)	GK	8 April 1986 (aged 28)	Academy	2003	2019	402	0
41	Vadim Karpov	(Russia)	GK	10 May 1994 (aged 20)	Academy	2012		0	0
45	Ilya Pomazun	(Russia)	GK	16 August 1996 (aged 17)	Academy	2012		0	0
Defenders
2	Mário Fernandes	(Brazil)	DF	19 September 1990 (aged 23)	Grêmio	2012	2017	48	1
4	Sergei Ignashevich	(Russia)	DF	14 July 1979 (aged 34)	Lokomotiv Moscow	2004		398	35
5	Viktor Vasin	(Russia)	DF	6 October 1988 (aged 25)	Spartak Nalchik	2011		8	0
6	Aleksei Berezutski	(Russia)	DF	20 June 1982 (aged 31)	Chernomorets Novorossiysk	2001		403	8
14	Kirill Nababkin	(Russia)	DF	8 September 1986 (aged 27)	Moscow	2010		114	0
24	Vasili Berezutski	(Russia)	DF	20 June 1982 (aged 31)	Torpedo-ZIL	2002		395	10
39	Vyacheslav Karavayev	(Russia)	DF	20 May 1995 (aged 18)	Academy	2011		4	0
42	Georgi Shchennikov	(Russia)	DF	27 April 1991 (aged 23)	Academy	2008		174	1
44	Andrei Nalyotov	(Russia)	DF	31 March 1995 (aged 19)	Academy	2012		0	0
77	Pavel Drozdov	(Russia)	DF	21 June 1993 (aged 20)	Academy	2011		0	0
96	Denis Masyutin	(Russia)	DF	9 July 1995 (aged 18)	Academy	2012		0	0
Midfielder
3	Pontus Wernbloom	(Sweden)	MF	25 June 1986 (aged 27)	AZ	2012	2016	81	6
7	Zoran Tošić	(Serbia)	MF	28 April 1987 (aged 27)	Manchester United	2010	2015	136	33
8	Steven Zuber	(Switzerland)	MF	17 August 1991 (aged 22)	Grasshopper	2013	2018	37	1
10	Alan Dzagoev	(Russia)	MF	17 June 1990 (aged 23)	Krylia Sovetov-SOK Dimitrovgrad	2008		205	47
15	Dmitry Yefremov	(Russia)	MF	5 February 1994 (aged 20)	Akademiya Tolyatti	2013		13	0
19	Aleksandrs Cauņa	(Latvia)	MF	19 January 1988 (aged 26)	Skonto	2011	2016	62	5
20	Rasmus Elm	(Sweden)	MF	17 March 1988 (aged 26)	AZ	2012	2015	60	5
23	Georgi Milanov	(Bulgaria)	MF	19 January 1992 (aged 218)	Litex Lovech	2013	2018	32	1
25	Elvir Rahimić	(Bosnia and Herzegovina)	MF	4 April 1976 (aged 38)	Anzhi Makhachkala	2001		347	7
40	Yuri Bavin	(Russia)	MF	5 February 1994 (aged 20)	Academy	2012		1	0
46	Nikolai Dergachyov	(Russia)	MF	24 May 1994 (aged 19)	Saturn-2	2012		0	0
51	Maksim Martusevich	(Russia)	MF	7 March 1995 (aged 19)	Academy	2012		0	0
61	Leonid Rodionov	(Russia)	MF	12 January 1993 (aged 21)	Academy	2010		0	0
70	Armen Ambartsumyan	(Russia)	MF	11 April 1994 (aged 20)	Academy	2010		1	0
97	Dmitri Litvinov	(Russia)	MF	6 March 1995 (aged 19)	Academy	2012		0	0
	Aleksandr Stolyarenko	(Russia)	MF	18 January 1991 (aged 23)	Togliatti	2009		0	0
	Amirbek Juraboev	(Tajikistan)	MF	6 March 1995 (aged 19)	Academy	2013		0	0
Forwards
18	Ahmed Musa	(Nigeria)	FW	13 August 1989 (aged 24)	VVV-Venlo	2012	2017	85	25
31	Vitinho	(Brazil)	FW	21 October 1994 (aged 19)	Botafogo	2013	2018	18	0
50	Sergei Seredin	(Russia)	FW	10 April 1994 (aged 20)	Academy	2011		0	0
71	Konstantin Bazelyuk	(Russia)	FW	12 April 1993 (aged 21)	Academy	2010		24	3
88	Seydou Doumbia	(Ivory Coast)	FW	31 December 1987 (aged 26)	Young Boys	2010	2015	109	73
94	Georgi Bagdasaryan	(Russia)	FW	21 October 1994 (aged 19)	Academy	2012		0	0
Away on loan
11	Mark González	(Chile)	MF	10 July 1984 (aged 29)	Real Betis	2009	2014	68	9
36	Yegor Ivanov	(Russia)	MF	19 June 1992 (aged 21)	Academy	2010		0	0
38	Vyacheslav Isupov	(Russia)	GK	16 January 1993 (aged 21)	Academy	2010		0	0
52	Ravil Netfullin	(Russia)	MF	3 March 1993 (aged 21)	Academy	2012		9	0
80	David Khurtsidze	(Russia)	MF	4 July 1993 (aged 20)	Academy	2011		0	0
90	Anton Polyutkin	(Russia)	DF	2 February 1993 (aged 21)	Academy	2011		0	0
89	Tomáš Necid	(Czech Republic)	FW	13 August 1989 (aged 24)	Slavia Prague	2009		106	31
92	Pyotr Ten	(Russia)	DF	12 July 1992 (aged 21)	Academy	2010		1	0
	Sekou Oliseh	(Liberia)	MF	5 June 1990 (aged 23)	Midtjylland	2010	2015	78	5
Players that left during the season
7	Keisuke Honda	(Japan)	MF	13 June 1986 (aged 27)	VVV-Venlo	2010	2013	127	28
9	Vágner Love	(Brazil)	FW	11 June 1984 (aged 29)	Palmeiras	2013	2016	258	124
17	Pavel Mamayev	(Russia)	MF	17 September 1988 (aged 25)	Torpedo Moscow	2007		181	7

== Transfers ==
=== In ===
Date	Position	Nationality	Name	From	Fee	Ref.
5 July 2013	MF	(Switzerland)	Steven Zuber	Grasshopper	Undisclosed	
5 July 2013	MF	(Bulgaria)	Georgi Milanov	Litex Lovech	Undisclosed	
2 September 2013	MF	(Brazil)	Vitinho	Botafogo	Undisclosed	

=== Out ===
Date	Position	Nationality	Name	To	Fee	Ref.
10 June 2013	DF	(Russia)	Semyon Fedotov	Lokomotiv-2 Moscow	Undisclosed	
10 June 2013	DF	(Serbia)	Uroš Ćosić	Pescara	Undisclosed	
10 June 2013	MF	(Russia)	Artyom Popov	Lokomotiv-2 Moscow	Undisclosed	
21 June 2013	GK	(Russia)	Artur Nigmatullin	Volga Nizhny Novgorod	Undisclosed	
24 July 2013	FW	(Brazil)	Vágner Love	Shandong Luneng Taishan	Undisclosed	
29 July 2013	MF	(Russia)	Gela Zaseyev	Alania Vladikavkaz	Undisclosed	
31 July 2013	MF	(Russia)	Aleksandr Vasilyev	Rostov	Undisclosed	
21 August 2013	DF	(Russia)	Andrei Vasyanovich	Rotor Volgograd	Undisclosed	
2 September 2013	MF	(Russia)	Evgeni Aldonin	Volga Nizhny Novgorod	Undisclosed	
9 December 2013	MF	(Russia)	Pavel Mamayev	Krasnodar	Undisclosed	
21 January 2014	FW	(Brazil)	Ricardo Jesus	Querétaro	Undisclosed	
11 February 2014	DF	(Russia)	Layonel Adams	Yenisey Krasnoyarsk	Undisclosed	

=== Loans out ===
Date from	Position	Nationality	Name	To	Date to	Ref.
10 June 2013	DF	(Russia)	Pyotr Ten	Rotor Volgograd	Season Long	
21 June 2013	MF	(Russia)	Yegor Ivanov	Yenisey Krasnoyarsk	Season Long	
8 July 2013	GK	(Russia)	Vyacheslav Isupov	Lokomotiv-2 Moscow	Season Long	
8 July 2013	MF	(Liberia)	Sekou Oliseh	PAOK	Season Long	
15 July 2013	MF	(Russia)	Ravil Netfullin	Fakel Voronezh	Season Long	
18 July 2013	FW	(Czech Republic)	Tomáš Necid	PAOK	31 December 2013	
26 July 2013	GK	(Russia)	Pavel Mamayev	Krasnodar	9 December 2013	
21 August 2013	MF	(Russia)	David Khurtsidze	Zenit Penza	Season Long	
2 September 2013	DF	(Russia)	Anton Polyutkin	Yenisey Krasnoyarsk	Season Long	
1 January 2014	MF	(Chile)	Mark González	Universidad Católica	End of season	
13 January 2014	FW	(Czech Republic)	Tomáš Necid	Slavia Prague	End of season	

=== Released ===
Date	Position	Nationality	Name	Joined	Date
31 December 2013	MF	(Japan)	Keisuke Honda	Milan	3 January 2014
15 May 2014	MF	(Bosnia and Herzegovina)	Elvir Rahimić	Retired	
30 June 2014	MF	(Russia)	Keisuke	Sokol Saratov	1 July 2014
30 June 2014	MF	(Tajikistan)	Amirbek Juraboev	Khayr Vahdat	1 July 2014

=== Trial ===
Date From	Date To	Position	Nationality	Name	Last club
27 January 2014		FW	(Slovakia)	Adam Zreľák	Ružomberok

== Friendlies ==
30 June 2013	Jiangsu U-20 (China)	0 – 4	(Russia) CSKA Moscow	Nanjing, China
MSK (UTC+4)		Summary	Bazelyuk 35'; Necid 48', 80', 90'	Stadium: Nanjing Olympic Sports Center

2 July 2013	Jiangsu Sainty (China)	2 – 1	(Russia) CSKA Moscow	Nanjing, China
15:40 MSK (UTC+4)	Mamatil 38'; Wu Xi 90'	Summary	Dzagoev 47'	Stadium: Nanjing Olympic Sports Center

7 July 2013	CSKA Moscow	0 – 0	Volga Nizhny Novgorod
17:30 MSK (UTC+4)		Summary

9 September 2013	CSKA Moscow	3 – 0	Znamya Truda	Moscow
13:00 MSK (UTC+4)	Vasin 35'; Yefremov 54'; Vitinho 88'	Summary

30 January 2014	CSKA Moscow (Russia)	0 – 0 (4 – 2 p)	(Ukraine) Metalist Kharkiv	Israel
MSK (UTC+4)		Summary		Referee: A. Efet (Israel)
	Penalties
	Tošić (penalty scored); Zreľák (penalty scored); Bazelyuk (penalty scored); Dzagoev (penalty scored)		(penalty missed) Dević; (penalty missed) Souza; (penalty scored) Blanco; (penalty scored) Gómez

2 February 2014	CSKA Moscow (Russia)	0 – 2	(Russia) Zenit St.Petersburg	Israel
MSK (UTC+4)		Summary	Hulk 17'; Shatov 89'	Referee: A. Efet (Israel)

6 February 2014	CSKA Moscow (Russia)	1 – 2	(Ukraine) Shakhtar Donetsk	Israel
MSK (UTC+4)	Tošić 8'	Summary	Srna 40'; Taison 43'

14 February 2014	Dnipro Dnipropetrovsk (Ukraine)	1 – 0	(Russia) CSKA Moscow	Marbella, Spain
MSK (UTC+4)	Konoplyanka 72'	Summary

17 February 2014	Videoton (Hungary)	1 – 2	(Russia) CSKA Moscow	Marbella, Spain
MSK (UTC+4)	Nikolić 40' (pen.)	Summary	Doumbia 33'; Musa 75'

22 February 2014	Strømsgodset (Norway)	0 – 3	(Russia) CSKA Moscow	Marbella, Spain
MSK (UTC+4)		Summary	Tošić 3'; Doumbia 42'; Bazelyuk 74'

25 February 2014	Molde (Norway)	1 – 1	(Russia) CSKA Moscow	Marbella, Spain
MSK (UTC+4)	Agnaldo 78'	Summary	Bazelyuk 79'

== Competitions ==
=== Russian Super Cup ===
13 July 2013	CSKA Moscow	3 – 0	Zenit St. Petersburg	Rostov-on-Don
21:30 MSK (UTC+4)	Honda 15', 83'; Ignashevich 36'; Zuber (yellow card) 52'	Report	Neto (yellow card) 35'; Bukharov (yellow card) 85'	Stadium: Olimp – 2 Attendance: 15,500; Referee: Alexander Yegorov

=== Russian Premier League ===
==== Results by round ====
Round	1	2	3	4	5	6	7	8	9	10	11	12	13	14	15	16	17	18	19	20	21	22	23	24	25	26	27	28	29	30
Ground	A	H	A	A	H	A	H	H	A	H	A	H	A	H	A	H	H	A	A	A	H	A	H	A	H	A	H	A	H	H
Result	D	W	W	D	W	W	W	W	L	D	L	L	L	W	W	W	W	D	L	L	W	W	W	W	W	W	W	W	W	W
Position	5	4	3	3	3	1	1	1	3	4	4	5	6	4	4	4	4	4	5	5	5	5	3	3	3	3	3	3	1	1

Updated to match(es) played on 16 May 2014. Source: See results
A = Away; H = Home; W = Win; D = Draw; L = Loss

==== Results ====
17 July 2013 1	Ural Sverdlovsk	2 – 2	CSKA Moscow	Yekaterinburg
17:30 MSK (UTC+4)	Gogniyev 48', 78'	Report	Musa 24'; Ignashevich (yellow card) 36'; Vágner Love 86'	Stadium: Central Stadium; Attendance: 25,200; Referee: Igor Nizovtsev

22 July 2013 2	CSKA Moscow	2 – 1	Krylia Sovetov	Moscow
20:00 MSK (UTC+4)	Schennikov (red card) 8'; Dzagoev (yellow card) 13' (penalty missed) 21; Wernbloom (yellow card) 24'; V. Berezutski (yellow card) 45'; Doumbia 67', 79' (pen.)	Report	Maksimov 13' (pen.); Vyeramko (yellow card) 36'; Taranov (yellow card) 78'; Balyaikin (yellow card) 86'; Ajinjal (yellow card) 89'	Stadium: Arena Khimki; Attendance: 9,000; Referee: Sergey Kuznetsov

28 July 2013 3	Lokomotiv Moscow	1 – 2	CSKA Moscow	Moscow
13:30 MSK (UTC+4)	Samedov (penalty missed) 74'; Tarasov 75'; N'Doye (yellow card) 85'	Report	Honda 18'; Wernbloom (yellow card) 30'; Musa 82'	Stadium: Lokomotiv Stadium; Attendance: 19,821; Referee: Aleksei Nikolaev

3 August 2013 4	Rubin Kazan	0 – 0	CSKA Moscow	Kazan
13:30 MSK (UTC+4)		Report		Stadium: Central Stadium; Attendance: 20,087; Referee: Alexander Yegorov

18 August 2013 5	CSKA Moscow	1 – 0	Kuban Krasnodar	Moscow
13:30 MSK (UTC+4)	Musa 11'	Report	Kaboré (yellow card) 19'	Stadium: Arena Khimki; Attendance: 9,000; Referee: Aleksei Eskov

24 August 2013 6	Tom Tomsk	1 – 2	CSKA Moscow	Tomsk
16:00 MSK (UTC+4)	Bashkirov (yellow card) 23'; Portnyagin 30' (yellow card) 86'; Komkov (yellow card) 45'	Report	Doumbia 51'; Schennikov (yellow card) 54'; Musa 58'	Stadium: Trud Stadium; Attendance: 9,700; Referee: Sergey Ivanov

30 August 2013 7	CSKA Moscow	2 – 1	Amkar Perm	Moscow
20:00 MSK (UTC+4)	Doumbia 23'; Nababkin (yellow card) 52'; Musa 77'	Report	Peev 1'; Zanev (yellow card) 54'; Gol (yellow card) 80'; Georgiev (yellow card) 84'; Belorukov (yellow card) 90'	Stadium: Arena Khimki; Attendance: 7,000; Referee: Sergey Lapochkin

14 September 2013 8	CSKA Moscow	1 – 0	Rostov	Moscow
13:30 MSK (UTC+4)	Bazelyuk 70'; Ignashevich (yellow card) 87'; Zuber (yellow card) 90'	Report	Gațcan (yellow card) 43'; Kalachev (yellow card) 57'; Kanga (yellow card) 62'; Dyakov (yellow card) 86'	Stadium: Eduard Streltsov Stadium; Attendance: 9,900; Referee: Vladislav Bezborodov
Note: The match was moved to the Eduard Streltsov Stadium, Moscow due to the poor quality of the pitch at Arena Khimki, Khimki.

22 September 2013 9	Spartak Moscow	3 – 0	CSKA Moscow	Moscow
13:30 MSK (UTC+4)	Özbiliz 40', (yellow card) 47'; Glushakov (yellow card) 45'; Kombarov 52'; Parshivlyuk 59'; Movsisyan (yellow card) 66'	Summary	Ignashevich (yellow card) 46'; Nababkin (yellow card) 66'	Stadium: Lokomotiv Stadium; Attendance: 27,000; Referee: Aleksei Nikolaev

25 September 2013 10	CSKA Moscow	0 – 0	Anzhi Makhachkala	Moscow
20:30 MSK (UTC+4)		Report	Solomatin (yellow card) 81'; Razak (yellow card) 89'	Stadium: Eduard Streltsov Stadium; Attendance: 8,500; Referee: Vitali Meshkov
Note: The match was moved to the Eduard Streltsov Stadium, Moscow due to the poor quality of the pitch at Arena Khimki, Khimki.

28 September 2013 11	Terek Grozny	2 – 0	CSKA Moscow	Grozny
16:00 MSK (UTC+4)	Kanu 19', (yellow card) 20'; Aissati (yellow card) 38'; Legear (yellow card) 45'; Lebedenko 75'; Ivanov (yellow card) 88'	Report	Wernbloom (yellow card) 79'	Stadium: Terek Stadium; Attendance: 16,820; Referee: Sergey Ivanov

6 October 2013 12	CSKA Moscow	0 – 2	Dynamo Moscow	Moscow
13:30 MSK (UTC+4)		Report	Noboa 57'; Kokorin 89', (yellow card) 90'; Kasaev (yellow card) 90'	Stadium: MSA Lokomotiv; Attendance: 7,700; Referee: Alexander Yegorov
Note: The match was moved to the MSA Lokomotiv, Moscow due to the poor quality of the pitch at Arena Khimki, Khimki.

18 October 2013 13	Zenit St. Petersburg	2 – 0	CSKA Moscow	Saint Petersburg
20:00 MSK (UTC+4)	Shirokov 16'; Hulk 45'	Report	Vitinho (yellow card) 77'; Wernbloom (yellow card) 80'	Stadium: Petrovsky Stadium; Attendance: 18,899; Referee: Vitali Meshkov

27 October 2013 14	CSKA Moscow	5 – 1	Krasnodar	Moscow
16:00 MSK (UTC+4)	Tošić 14', 27', 39'; Doumbia 18'; A. Berezutski (yellow card) 36'; Ignashevich 67'	Report	Mamayev 49'; Pereyra (yellow card) 56'; Gazinsky (yellow card) 66'; Isael (yellow card) 90'	Stadium: Eduard Streltsov Stadium; Attendance: 8,500; Referee: Mikhail Vilkov
Note: The match was moved to the Eduard Streltsov Stadium, Moscow due to the poor quality of the pitch at Arena Khimki, Khimki.

2 November 2013 15	Volga Nizhny Novgorod	1 – 2	CSKA Moscow	Nizhny Novgorod
13:30 MSK (UTC+4)	Shelton 30', (yellow card) 33'; Kontsedalov (yellow card) 32'; Rodić (yellow card) 65'	Report	Doumbia 34', (yellow card) 90'; Tošić 72'; Wernbloom (yellow card) 86'; Honda (yellow card) 90'	Stadium: Lokomotiv Stadium; Attendance: 12,000; Referee: Sergey Kuznetsov

10 November 2013 16	CSKA Moscow	4 – 1	Terek Grozny	Moscow
15:45 MSK (UTC+4)	Doumbia 9', 38' (pen.); Tošić 20'; Ignashevich 24'; Elm (yellow card) 52'	Report	Ferreira (yellow card) 10'; Kanu (yellow card) 30'; Aissati (yellow card) 39'; Aílton 72'; Ivanov (yellow card) 90'	Stadium: Eduard Streltsov Stadium; Attendance: 8,500; Referee: Sergei Karasev
Note: The match was moved to the Eduard Streltsov Stadium, Moscow due to the poor quality of the pitch at Arena Khimki, Khimki.

23 November 2013 17	CSKA Moscow	1 – 0	Spartak Moscow	Moscow
17:00 MSK (UTC+4)	Doumbia 8'; Wernbloom (yellow card) 26'	Report	D.Kombarov (yellow card) 39'; Movsisyan (yellow card) 47'; Rafael Carioca (yellow card) 58'; João Carlos (yellow card) 81'	Stadium: Arena Khimki; Attendance: 14,800; Referee: Alexander Yegorov

2 December 2013 18	Rostov	0 – 0	CSKA Moscow	Rostov-on-Don
17:00 MSK (UTC+4)		Report	Musa (yellow card) 23'; Shchennikov (yellow card) 88'	Stadium: Olimp–2; Attendance: 14,200; Referee: Mikhail Vilkov

6 December 2013 19	Krasnodar	1 – 0	CSKA Moscow	Krasnodar
17:45 MSK (UTC+4)	Kaleshin (yellow card) 17'; Jędrzejczyk 63'; Markov (yellow card) 89'; Sinitsyn (yellow card) 90'	Report	Akinfeev (yellow card) 58'; Dzagoev (yellow card) 66'; Shchennikov (yellow card) 74'	Stadium: Kuban Stadium; Attendance: 11,300; Referee: Vitali Meshkov

9 March 2013 20	Dynamo Moscow	4 – 2	CSKA Moscow	Moscow
13:30 MSK (UTC+4)	Kurányi 49', (yellow card) 84'; Samba 59'; Kokorin (yellow card) 60'; Zhirkov 62', 69'; Gabulov (yellow card) 81'; Denisov (yellow card) 90'	Report	Doumbia 12', 43'; Musa (yellow card) 55'	Stadium: Arena Khimki; Attendance: 16,852; Referee: Vladislav Bezborodov

15 March 2014 21	CSKA Moscow	1 – 0	Zenit St. Petersburg	Moscow
16:00 MSK (UTC+4)	Milanov 32'	Report	Smolnikov (yellow card) 79'; Hubočan (yellow card) 90'	Stadium: Arena Khimki; Attendance: 14,200; Referee: Mikhail Vilkov

24 March 2014 22	Anzhi Makhachkala	0 – 3	CSKA Moscow	Kaspiysk
17:00 MSK (UTC+4)		Summary	Doumbia 26', 51'; Fernandes (yellow card) 33'; Elm (yellow card) 62'; Milanov (yellow card) 65'; Musa 76'	Stadium: Anzhi-Arena; Attendance: 18,200; Referee: Vitali Meshkov

31 March 2014 23	CSKA Moscow	3 – 0	Volga Nizhny Novgorod	Moscow
20:45 MSK (UTC+4)	Tošić 5'; Dzagoev 7', (red card) 41'; Akinfeev (yellow card) 63'; Wernbloom 69'	Report	Minosyan (yellow card) 21'; Sychev (yellow card) 73'; Sarkisov (yellow card) 74'; Karyaka (yellow card) 83'	Stadium: Arena Khimki; Attendance: 4,000; Referee: Vladimir Kazmenko

5 April 2014 24	Krylia Sovetov	1 – 3	CSKA Moscow	Rostov-on-Don
16:30 MSK (UTC+4)	Yatchenko (yellow card) 56'; Chochiyev 88'	Report	Tošić 4', 55'; Doumbia 7'; Milanov (yellow card) 66'	Stadium: Olimp-2; Attendance: 4,700; Referee: Alexander Yegorov
Note: Match moved to the Olimp-2 in Rostov-on-Don due to the poor quality of the pitch at Metallurg Stadium, Samara.

12 April 2014 25	CSKA Moscow	1 – 0	Ural Sverdlovsk	Moscow
14:30 MSK (UTC+4)	Musa 17'; Wernbloom (yellow card) 81'	Report	Fidler (yellow card) 53'; Acevedo (yellow card) 70'; Yerokhin (yellow card) 75'	Stadium: Arena Khimki; Attendance: 7,000; Referee: Vladislav Bezborodov

20 April 2014 26	Kuban Krasnodar	0 – 4	CSKA Moscow	Krasnodar
18:30 MSK (UTC+4)	Bugayev (red card) 44'	Report	Zuber 38'; Doumbia 45' (pen.); Bazelyuk 49'; Tošić 66'	Stadium: Kuban Stadium; Attendance: 14,120; Referee: Vitali Meshkov

27 April 2014 27	CSKA Moscow	2 – 1	Rubin Kazan	Moscow
13:30 MSK (UTC+4)	Dzagoev 13'; Doumbia 53' (pen.); Milanov (yellow card) 87'	Report	Kvirkvelia (yellow card) 19'; Torbinski (yellow card) 26'; Prudnikov 48'; Karadeniz (yellow card) 79'	Stadium: Arena Khimki; Attendance: 10,200; Referee: Sergey Karasev

2 May 2014 28	Amkar Perm	1 – 3	CSKA Moscow	Perm
14:00 MSK (UTC+4)	Peev 45'; Wawrzyniak (yellow card) 54'; Phibel (yellow card) 78'; Ogude (yellow card) 79'	Report	Doumbia (yellow card) 18', (goal) 82'; Dzagoev 39'; Tošić 55'	Stadium: Zvezda Stadium; Attendance: 10,000; Referee: Sergey Lapochkin

11 May 2014 29	CSKA Moscow	2 – 0	Tom Tomsk	Moscow
15:45 MSK (UTC+4)	Doumbia (yellow card) 49', (goal) 90'; Milanov (yellow card) 54'; Sabitov 62' (o.g.)	Report	Rykov (yellow card) 14'; Ignatovich (yellow card) 26'; Milanov (yellow card) 67'	Stadium: Arena Khimki; Attendance: 7,500; Referee: Igor Nizovtsev

15 May 2014 30	CSKA Moscow	1 – 0	Lokomotiv Moscow	Moscow
18:30 MSK (UTC+4)	Tošić 46'; Doumbia (yellow card) 86'; Akinfeev (yellow card) 90'	Report	Ćorluka (yellow card) 86'; Samedov (yellow card) 90'	Stadium: Arena Khimki; Attendance: 18,100; Referee: Aleksei Nikolaev

==== League table ====
Pos	Team	Pld	W	D	L	GF	GA	GD	Pts	Qualification or relegation
1	CSKA Moscow (C)	30	20	4	6	49	26	+23	64	Qualification for the Champions League group stage
2	Zenit St. Petersburg	30	19	6	5	63	32	+31	63	Qualification for the Champions League third qualifying round
3	Lokomotiv Moscow	30	17	8	5	51	23	+28	59	Qualification for the Europa League play-off round
4	Dynamo Moscow	30	15	7	8	54	37	+17	52	Qualification for the Europa League third qualifying round
5	Krasnodar	30	15	5	10	46	39	+7	50 (Note: Krasnodar ahead of Spartak Moscow on head-to-head points; Krasnodar–Spartak Moscow 4–0, Spartak Moscow–Krasnodar 3–2.)	Qualification for the Europa League second qualifying round

Source: Russian Premier League
Rules for classification: 1) points; 2) number of wins; 3) head-to-head points; 4) number of head-to-head wins; 5) head-to-head goal difference; 6) number of head-to-head goals scored; 7) number of head-to-head away goals scored; 8) goal difference; 9) number of goals scored; 10) number of away goals scored; 11) position in the 2012–13 season (only used until all the regularly scheduled games have been played); 11) extra play-off game or tournament between the teams in question.
(C) Champions

=== Russian Cup ===
30 October 2013 Round of 32	Khimik Dzerzhinsk	1 – 2	CSKA Moscow	Dzerzhinsk
16:00 MSK (UTC+4)	Kichin (yellow card) 37'; Yerkin 51' (pen.); Pashtov (yellow card) 69'; Kasyan (red card) 73'	Report	Bazelyuk 20'; Kichin 29' (o.g.)	Stadium: Khimik Stadium; Attendance: 3,000; Referee: Vasiliy Kazartsev

2 March 2014 Last 16	CSKA Moscow	2 – 0	Sokol Saratov	Moscow
16:00 MSK (UTC+4)	Fernandes 24', (yellow card) 29'; Musa 59'	Report	Andreyev (yellow card) 38'; Dutov (yellow card) 55'; Tsukanov (yellow card) 62'	Stadium: Arena Khimki; Attendance: 6,500; Referee: Sergey Ivanov

27 March 2014 Quarterfinal	CSKA Moscow	1 – 0 (a.e.t.)	Terek Grozny	Moscow
20:00 MSK (UTC+4)	A. Berezutski (yellow card) 43'; Schennikov (yellow card) 45', (goal) 111'; Milanov (yellow card) 61'	Report	Kanu (yellow card) 7'; Maurício (yellow card) 26'; Kudryashov (yellow card) 39'; Utsiyev (yellow card) 41'; Komorowski (red card) 79'	Stadium: Arena Khimki; Attendance: 6,000; Referee: Vladislav Bezborodov

6 April 2014 Semifinal	CSKA Moscow	0 – 1	Krasnodar	Moscow
19:30 MSK (UTC+4)	Wernbloom (yellow card) 42'; Ignashevich (yellow card) 90'; V. Berezutski (yellow card) 90'	Report	Wánderson 28'; Mamayev (yellow card) 43'; Ari (yellow card) 76'; Joãozinho (yellow card) 89'; Sinitsyn (yellow card) 90'	Stadium: Arena Khimki; Attendance: 6,000; Referee: Mikhail Vilkov

=== UEFA Champions League ===
==== Group stage ====
Pos	Team	Pld	W	D	L	GF	GA	GD	Pts	Qualification	BAY	MCI	PLZ	CSKA
1	(Germany) Bayern Munich	6	5	0	1	17	5	+12	15 (Note: Tied on head-to-head points (3). Head-to-head goal difference: Bayern Munich +1, Manchester City −1.)	Advance to knockout phase	—	2–3	5–0	3–0
2	(England) Manchester City	6	5	0	1	18	10	+8	15	Advance to knockout phase	1–3	—	4–2	5–2
3	(Czech Republic) Viktoria Plzeň	6	1	0	5	6	17	−11	3 (Note: Tied on head-to-head points (3) and head-to-head goal difference (0). Head-to-head away goals: Viktoria Plzeň 2, CSKA Moscow 1.)	Transfer to Europa League	0–1	0–3	—	2–1
4	(Russia) CSKA Moscow	6	1	0	5	8	17	−9	3		1–3	1–2	3–2	—

Source: UEFA
Notes:

17 September 2013 1	Bayern Munich (Germany)	3 – 0	(Russia) CSKA Moscow	Munich
22:45 MSK (UTC+4)	Alaba 4'; Mandžukić 41'; Robben 68'	Report		Stadium: Allianz Arena; Attendance: 68,000; Referee: Gianluca Rocchi (Italy); Man of the Match: David Alaba

2 October 2013 2	CSKA Moscow (Russia)	3 – 2	(Czech Republic) Viktoria Plzeň	Saint Petersburg
21:00 MSK (UTC+4)	Tošić 19'; Honda 29'; Řezník 78' (o.g.)	Report	Rajtoral 4'; Hořava (yellow card) 22'; Tecl (yellow card) 76'; Bakoš 90+1'	Stadium: Petrovsky Stadium; Attendance: 6,000; Referee: Bas Nijhuis (Netherlands); Man of the Match: Keisuke Honda

23 October 2013 3	CSKA Moscow (Russia)	1 – 2	(England) Manchester City	Moscow
20:00 MSK (UTC+4)	Tošić 32'; Wernbloom (yellow card) 45'; Ignashevich (yellow card) 54'; Musa (yellow card) 71'	Report	Agüero 34', 42'; Negredo (yellow card) 47'; Touré (yellow card) 64'; Zabaleta (yellow card) 79'	Stadium: Luzhniki Stadium; Attendance: 14,000; Referee: Ovidiu Hațegan (Romania)

5 November 2013 4	Manchester City (England)	5 – 2	(Russia) CSKA Moscow	Manchester
23:45 MSK (UTC+4)	Agüero 3' (pen.), 21'; Negredo 30', 51', 90+3'; Touré (yellow card) 57'	Report	Tošić (yellow card) 12'; Doumbia 45+1', 71' (pen.)	Stadium: Etihad Stadium; Attendance: 38,512; Referee: Carlos Velasco Carballo (Spain)

27 November 2013 5	CSKA Moscow (Russia)	1 – 3	(Germany) Bayern Munich	Moscow
21:00 MSK (UTC+4)	Honda 62' (pen.)	Report	Robben 17'; Martínez (yellow card) 43'; Götze 56'; Dante (yellow card) 61'; Müller 65' (pen.); Thiago (yellow card) 77'	Stadium: Luzhniki Stadium; Attendance: 14,000; Referee: Antony Gautier (France)

10 December 2013 6	Viktoria Plzeň (Czech Republic)	2 – 1	(Russia) CSKA Moscow	Plzeň
23:45 MSK (UTC+4)	Procházka (yellow card) 25'; Kolář 76'; Wágner 90'; Bakoš (yellow card) 90'	Report	Musa 65'; Dzagoev (red card) 67'; Shchennikov (yellow card) 79'; Honda (yellow card) 90'; Wernbloom (yellow card) 90+3' (red card) 90+3'	Stadium: Doosan Arena; Attendance: 11,205; Referee: Damir Skomina (Slovenia)

== Squad statistics ==
As of Match played 15 May 2014

=== Appearances and goals ===
No.	Pos	Nat	Player	Total		Premier League		Russian Cup		Champions League		Super Cup	
No.	Pos	Nat	Player	Apps	Goals	Apps	Goals	Apps	Goals	Apps	Goals	Apps	Goals
1	GK	(Russia) RUS	Sergei Chepchugov	2	0	1	0	1	0	0	0	0	0
2	DF	(Brazil) BRA	Mário Fernandes	15	1	12	0	3	1	0	0	0	0
3	MF	(Sweden) SWE	Pontus Wernbloom	36	1	27+1	1	1	0	6	0	1	0
4	DF	(Russia) RUS	Sergei Ignashevich	38	3	30	2	1	0	6	0	1	1
5	DF	(Russia) RUS	Viktor Vasin	1	0	0	0	1	0	0	0	0	0
6	DF	(Russia) RUS	Aleksei Berezutski	22	0	12+1	0	3	0	4+1	0	1	0
7	MF	(Serbia) SRB	Zoran Tošić	36	13	24+3	11	3	0	5+1	2	0	0
8	MF	(Switzerland) SUI	Steven Zuber	37	1	16+11	1	1+2	0	4+2	0	1	0
10	MF	(Russia) RUS	Alan Dzagoev	23	3	16+2	3	3	0	1	0	1	0
14	DF	(Russia) RUS	Kirill Nababkin	23	0	15+2	0	0	0	5	0	0+1	0
15	MF	(Russia) RUS	Dmitri Yefremov	9	0	0+7	0	0+2	0	0	0	0	0
18	FW	(Nigeria) NGR	Ahmed Musa	37	9	23+3	7	3+1	1	5+1	1	1	0
19	MF	(Latvia) LAT	Aleksandrs Cauņa	5	0	1+3	0	0	0	1	0	0	0
20	MF	(Sweden) SWE	Rasmus Elm	29	0	16+5	0	3	0	2+2	0	0+1	0
23	MF	(Bulgaria) BUL	Georgi Milanov	32	1	16+6	1	3+1	0	4+2	0	0	0
24	DF	(Russia) RUS	Vasili Berezutski	29	0	23	0	3	0	2	0	1	0
25	MF	(Bosnia and Herzegovina) BIH	Elvir Rahimić	1	0	0+1	0	0	0	0	0	0	0
31	FW	(Brazil) BRA	Vitinho	18	0	2+8	0	1+2	0	1+4	0	0	0
35	GK	(Russia) RUS	Igor Akinfeev	39	0	29	0	3	0	6	0	1	0
39	DF	(Russia) RUS	Vyacheslav Karavayev	4	0	0+2	0	1	0	1	0	0	0
40	DF	(Russia) RUS	Yuri Bavin	1	0	0	0	0+1	0	0	0	0	0
42	DF	(Russia) RUS	Georgi Schennikov	39	1	27+1	0	4	1	6	0	1	0
70	MF	(Russia) RUS	Armen Ambartsumyan	1	0	0	0	1	0	0	0	0	0
71	FW	(Russia) RUS	Konstantin Bazelyuk	23	3	1+16	2	1+3	1	0+2	0	0	0
88	FW	(Ivory Coast) CIV	Seydou Doumbia	27	20	18+4	18	3	0	2	2	0	0
Players away from the club on loan:
11	MF	(Chile) CHI	Mark González	9	0	1+6	0	1	0	0+1	0	0	0
Players who appeared for CSKA Moscow no longer at the club:
7	MF	(Japan) JPN	Keisuke Honda	25	5	18	1	0	0	5+1	2	1	2
9	FW	(Brazil) BRA	Vágner Love	3	1	2	1	0	0	0	0	1	0
17	MF	(Russia) RUS	Pavel Mamayev	1	0	0	0	0	0	0	0	0+1	0

=== Goal scorers ===
Place	Position	Nation	Number	Name	Premier League	Russian Cup	UEFA Champions League	Super Cup	Total
1	FW	(Ivory Coast)	88	Seydou Doumbia	18	0	2	0	20
2	MF	(Serbia)	7	Zoran Tošić	11	0	2	0	13
3	FW	(Nigeria)	18	Ahmed Musa	7	1	1	0	9
4	MF	(Japan)	7	Keisuke Honda	1	0	2	2	5
5	MF	(Russia)	10	Alan Dzagoev	3	0	0	0	3
5	FW	(Russia)	71	Konstantin Bazelyuk	2	1	0	0	3
5	DF	(Russia)	4	Sergei Ignashevich	2	0	0	1	3
5				Own goal	1	1	1	0	3
9	FW	(Brazil)	9	Vágner Love	1	0	0	0	1
9	MF	(Bulgaria)	23	Georgi Milanov	1	0	0	0	1
9	MF	(Sweden)	3	Pontus Wernbloom	1	0	0	0	1
9	MF	(Switzerland)	8	Steven Zuber	1	0	0	0	1
9	DF	(Brazil)	2	Mário Fernandes	0	1	0	0	1
9	DF	(Russia)	42	Georgi Schennikov	0	1	0	0	1
				TOTALS	49	5	8	3	65

=== Disciplinary record ===
Number	Nation	Position	Name	Premier League		Russian Cup		UEFA Champions League		Super Cup		Total	
Number	Nation	Position	Name	Yellow card	Red card	Yellow card	Red card	Yellow card	Red card	Yellow card	Red card	Yellow card	Red card
2	(Brazil)	DF	Mário Fernandes	1	0	1	0	0	0	0	0	2	0
3	(Sweden)	MF	Pontus Wernbloom	7	0	1	0	1	1	0	0	9	1
4	(Russia)	DF	Sergei Ignashevich	3	0	1	0	1	0	0	0	5	0
6	(Russia)	DF	Aleksei Berezutski	1	0	1	0	0	0	0	0	2	0
7	(Serbia)	MF	Zoran Tošić	0	0	0	0	1	0	0	0	1	0
8	(Switzerland)	MF	Steven Zuber	1	0	0	0	0	0	1	0	2	0
10	(Russia)	MF	Alan Dzagoev	2	1	0	0	0	1	0	0	2	2
14	(Russia)	DF	Kirill Nababkin	2	0	0	0	0	0	0	0	2	0
18	(Nigeria)	FW	Ahmed Musa	2	0	0	0	1	0	0	0	3	0
20	(Sweden)	MF	Rasmus Elm	2	0	0	0	0	0	0	0	2	0
23	(Bulgaria)	MF	Georgi Milanov	4	0	1	0	0	0	0	0	5	0
24	(Russia)	DF	Vasili Berezutski	1	0	1	0	0	0	0	0	2	0
31	(Brazil)	FW	Vitinho	1	0	0	0	0	0	0	0	1	0
35	(Russia)	GK	Igor Akinfeev	3	0	0	0	0	0	0	0	3	0
42	(Russia)	DF	Georgi Schennikov	3	1	1	0	1	0	0	0	5	1
88	(Ivory Coast)	FW	Seydou Doumbia	4	0	0	0	0	0	0	0	4	0
Players away on loan:
Players who left CSKA Moscow during the season:
7	(Japan)	MF	Keisuke Honda	1	0	0	0	0	0	0	0	1	0
			TOTALS	38	2	7	0	5	2	1	0	51	4
