= Go! Princess Pretty Cure the Movie: Go! Go!! Gorgeous Triple Feature!!! =

2015 film by Yukio Kaizawa, Akifumi Zako, and Hiroshi Miyamoto

- Kanji: 映画 Go! プリンセスプリキュア Go! Go!! 豪華3本立て!!!
- Revised Hepburn: Eiga Gō! Purinsesu Purikyua: Gō! Gō!! Gōka Sanbon Date!!!
- Directed by: Yukio Kaizawa (Cure Flora and the Mischievous Mirror); Akifumi Zako (Pumpkin Kingdom's Treasure); Hiroshi Miyamoto (Leff's Wonder Night!)
- Screenplay by: Sakurako Akino (Pumpkin Kingdom's Treasure)
- Based on: Pretty Cure by Izumi Todo
- Starring: Yū Shimamura; Masumi Asano; Hibiku Yamamura; Miyuki Sawashiro; Nao Tōyama; Shiho Kokido
- Cinematography: Tomoya Kamijō (Pumpkin Kingdom's Treasure)
- Edited by: Yoshihiro Aso
- Music by: Hiroshi Takaki
- Production company: Toei Animation
- Distributed by: Toei Company, Ltd.
- Release date: October 31, 2015
- Running time: 5 minutes (Cure Flora and the Mischievous Mirror); 50 minutes (Pumpkin Kingdom's Treasure); 20 minutes (Leff's Wonder Night!); 75 minutes (total)
- Country: Japan
- Language: Japanese
- Box office: 560 million yen

Go! Princess Pretty Cure the Movie: Go! Go!! Gorgeous Triple Feature!!! (Japanese: 映画 Go! プリンセスプリキュア Go! Go!! 豪華3本立て!!!, Hepburn: Eiga Gō! Purinsesu Purikyua Gō! Gō!! Gōka Sanbon Date!!!) is a 2015 Japanese animated action fantasy film based on Pretty Cure franchise created by Izumi Todo, and its twelfth series, Go! Princess Pretty Cure. The film is divided into three segments: Cure Flora and the Mischievous Mirror, Pumpkin Kingdom's Treasure and Leff's Wonder Night!. Each segments are directed by Yukio Kaizawa, Akifumi Zako, and Hiroshi Miyamoto respectively, and produced by Toei Animation. The film was released in Japan on October 31, 2015.

The catchcopy of the film is "Have a nice day at the Halloween party! By the power of everyone's hope, open! The door to your dream!!" (ハロウィン・パーティでごきげんよう! みんなの希望の力で、開け!夢への扉!!, Harowin pāti de gokigen'yō! Min'na no kibō no chikara de, ake! Yume e no tobira!!)

== Plot ==
=== Cure Flora and the Mischievous Mirror ===
Cure Flora enters a room, admiring her flower tiara, and comes across a mirror where a group of ghosts try to play a prank on her by copying her appearance. During their battle, Flora's tiara is broken, so the ghosts replace it by transforming into a pumpkin dress.

=== The Pumpkin Kingdom's Treasure ===
After fighting a Parfait Zetsuborg, Haruka and the others are suddenly transported to the Pumpkin Kingdom, where a Princess Convention is being held to determine the kingdom's new princess. As the girls participate in various contests, Towa suspects something is amiss, prompting Haruka, Pafu, and Aroma to follow a trio of fairies to the kingdom's true princess, Pumplulu, who is being held captive. Upon hearing that the kingdom's minister, Warp, had locked Pumplulu up and caused her parents to forget about her, Haruka decides to help her out, learning that the citizens are being forced to make pudding nonstop. As Warp traps the other girls after they win their respective contests, Haruka makes her family's special pudding for the king and queen, restoring their memories of Pumplulu. Warp then traps the Cures in crystals, revealing that he had targeted the kingdom to capture them. Haruka manages to break everyone free as the fairies work to rescue their trapped friends. As Warp transforms into his true form and starts absorbing the kingdom's citizens, Pumplulu unites the dreams of her citizens and the power of the Miracle Princess Lights. This creates the Halloween Dress Up Keys and gives the Cures the power to defeat Warp and restore peace to the Pumpkin Kingdom. As thanks, Pumplulu invites the girls to participate in a special ball.

=== Leff's Wonder Night! ===
One day, a doll on Haruka's desk named Leff comes to life and asks her and the other Cures to help her stop Night Pumpkin, who plunged her kingdom into darkness. While Leff distracts the Zetsuborg guards with her singing, the Cures make their way to the top of a castle, where they must place the Miracle Princess Light to restore light to the kingdom. After learning that Leff is the kingdom's princess, the Cures soon fight against Night Pumpkin, who overwhelms them and takes the Miracle Light. However, Haruka and Leff remain determined and get the light back, allowing Leff to reach the top and restore the Kingdom's light.

== Characters ==
=== Go! Princess PreCure ===
- Haruka Haruno / Cure Flora (Yū Shimamura)
- Minami Kaido / Cure Mermaid (Masumi Asano)
- Kirara Amanogawa / Cure Twinkle (Hibiku Yamamura)
- Towa Akagi / Cure Scarlet (Miyuki Sawashiro)
- Pafu (Nao Tōyama)
- Aroma (Shiho Kokido)
- Yui Nanase (Haruka Yoshimura)
- Miss Shamour (Mayumi Shintani)
- Zetsuborg (Takayuki Nakatsukasa)

Kuroro makes a non-speaking appearance at the end of Treasure, while Haruka's family makes a non-speaking appearance in Haruka's flashback.

=== The Pumpkin Kingdom's Treasure ===
- Kana Hanazawa as Princess Pumplulu (パンプルル姫, Panpururu-hime), the twelve-year old princess of the Pumpkin Kingdom. A clean and friendly character, she cherishes the memories of making pudding with her parents. She was trapped on top of the tower by Warp, but is rescued and reunited with her parents. While bidding farewell to the Cures, she gives them the Leff Doll (レフィの人形, Refi no Ningyō) her mother gave her. She was based on actress Suzu Hirose
- Chō and Kaori Yamagata as Pumpkin Kingdom's King and Queen (王様、お妃様, Ōsama, Okisakisama), the rulers of Pumpkin Kingdom and Pumplulu's parents. Before being brainwashed by Warp, the King was a researcher of pumpkin varieties and the Queen was a sewer who made clothes for the fairies and the Leff doll for her daughter.
- Misaki Kuno, Tomoko Kaneda, and Tomo Muranaka as Pan (パン), Pū (プウ) and Kin (キン) (respectively), the three fairies of Pumpkin Kingdom who resemble small pumpkins. Due to lacking speech capabilities, they convey emotions through gestures. By being with Pumplulu, they escape Warp's brainwashing and act to save her. Kaori Yamagata, who wrote the screenplay, stated that the fairies were inspired by the owarai trio DACHO CLUB.
- Junichi Suwabe as Warp (ウォープ, Wōpu), the main antagonist of the first segment who carries a white book that captures objects. Originally a member of Dys Dark, he left after continuing dissatisfaction with his inability to justify his own abilities; therefore he looks down on Dyspear. He locks Pumplulu and manipulates her parents to make them forget about her. He plans to capture the Cures as his collection and afterwards, reveals his intentions and assumes his Jackson's chameleon form, overpowering the Cures. With Pumplulu's encouragement, they manage to defeat him with Halloween Eclair. His appearance was inspired by the Kamen Rider Kabuto actor Hiro Mizushima.

=== Leff's Wonder Night! ===
- Hinata Uegaki as Princess Leff (レフィ姫, Refi-hime), the 10-year-old princess of Pumpkingdom (パンプキングダム, Panpukingudamu). She was originally a handmade doll given to Pumplulu, and was left in her room after her disappearance.
- Maaya Sakamoto as Leff's mother (レフィの母, Refi no Haha), the queen of Pumpkingdom, who once told Leff that "everything in the sun is given a name". At the same time the night light was taken away by Night Pumpkin, she was held prisoner alongside her husband, Leff's father (レフィの父, Refi no Chichi).
- Ryūsei Nakao as Night Pumpkin (ナイトパンプキン, Naito Panpukin), the main antagonist of Pretty Cure and Leff's Wonder Night!. He invaded Night Kingdom to turn the sky into night, and the Cures distract him so they can allow Leff to place the Miracle Light on top of his palace and banish into darkness.

== Production ==
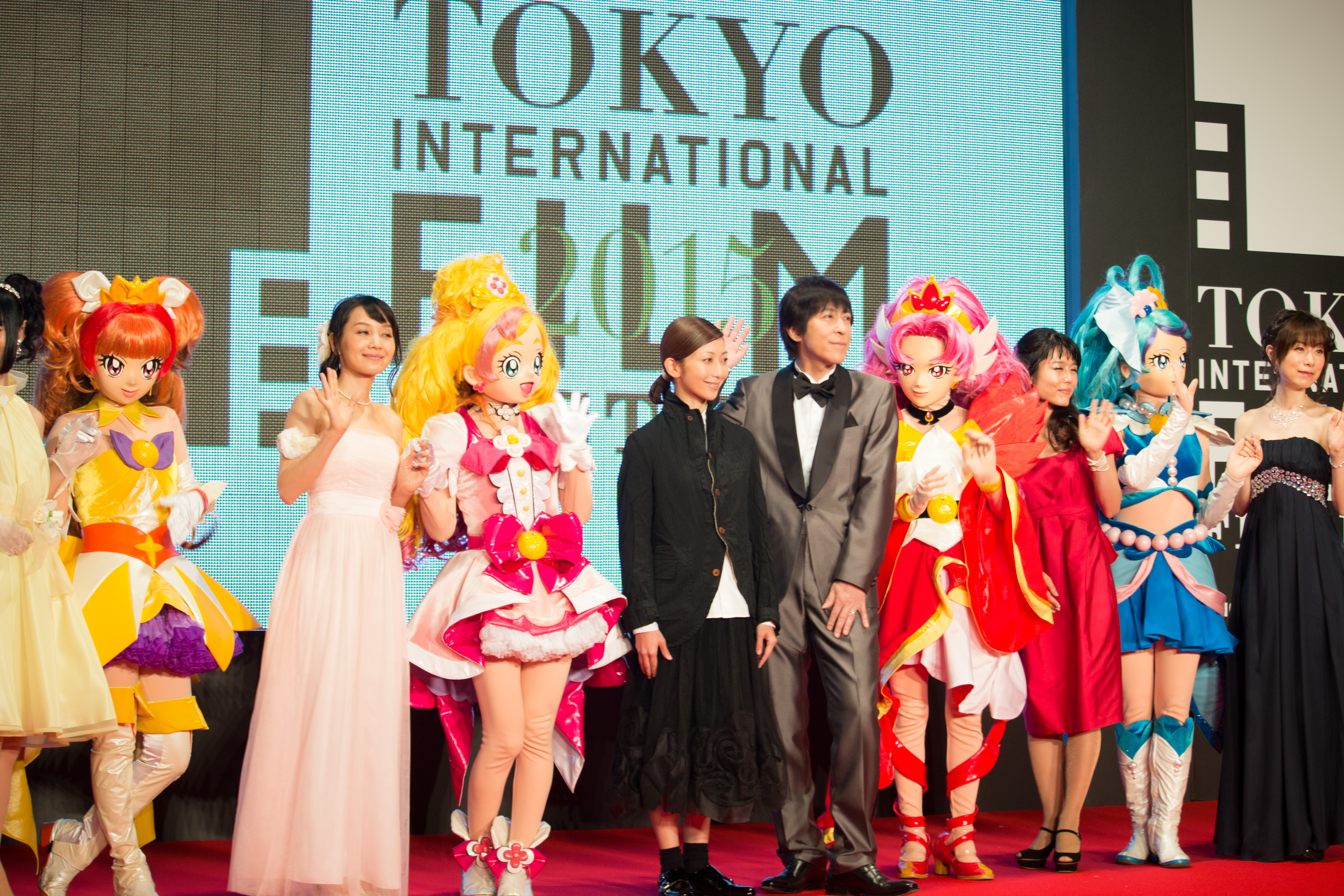
Every Little Thing alongside Pretty Cure kigurumi and the seiyu at the 2015 Tokyo International Film Festival

The film is split into three-parts: a 50-minute 2D film The Pumpkin Kingdom's Treasure (パンプキン王国のたからもの, Panpukin Ōkoku no Takaramono); a 20-minutes CGI film Leff's Wonder Night! (プリキュアとレフィのワンダーナイト!, Purikyua to Refi no Wandānaito!); and a 5-minute CGI short film Cure Flora and the Mischievous Mirror (キュアフローラといたずらかがみ, Kyua Furōra to Itazura Kagami).

About this screening form, Takashi Washio, who was in charge of planning the film, said:

The fall [movie] is screened as a single film, but the starting point was whether it could be a lively one with a little more stuff like the spring All-Stars film. So I consulted with the Digital Video Department and said "I would like to do new things based on the accumulation of computer-graphic technology so far". At first I was thinking of a review video, but I created something with a good story. It would have given the children a sense of incongruity to show them anything "unlike what they see on TV", but when I thought about the future, I was ready to take on the challenge.

Washio described his concept as:

An impressive adventure feature film, a full CG non-stop action story, and three full CGSD characters. Incorporating the essence of song, dance, and fashion, I would like to offer everyone a new form of challenge in the +10-year [Pretty Cure] series.

According to this configuration, the three-part film was to be screened in 75 minutes. Washio described the reason of making the feature-length fifty-minutes long:

I challenged this time, thinking that it would be 50 minutes for the children to concentrate and see until the end.

The film's Miracle Light, the Miracle Princess Light (ミラクルプリンセスライト, Mirakuru Purinsesu Raito), was distributed to the audience for them to participate. Puff and Aroma were in charge of explaining the Miracle Light, though explanations and warnings are omitted. A paper sun-visor "Princess Tiara" was also distributed.

An exhibition for the film was held at the 28th Tokyo International Film Festival, and the world premiere screening was held there on October 24. In addition, on October 22, an opening red carpet in Roppongi Hills where Pretty Cure kigurumi, the four Pretty Cure seiyu, and Every Little Thing participated, and a red carpet-walk at "Shinjuku Art Heaven 2015" on October 24 featured a Cure Flora kigurumi, the four Pretty Cure seiyu, and three of the directors.

Due to the film's success, an all-night screening of the five last fall Pretty Cure films was held on November 13 for adults fans aged 18 and over at Shinjuku WALD 9. At the same event, a talk show was held with the guests being the three directors, Washio, assistant producer Risa Nikaidō, and series producer Yū Kamiki. Also on October 27, Karin Isobe, Rie Kitagawa, and Shōko Ōmori were talk show guests.

This was the final work recorded in the old studio of Tavac in Shinjuku before the franchise's move to Toei Digital Center in Higashiōizumi, Nerima, Tokyo; Yu Shimamura said:

I was really happy to take the movie version at the end of the site where [Toei Animation] recorded Pretty Cure for many years. It was my pride to be able to play the lead role of Tavac's [...] final work.

=== Cure Flora and the Mischievous Mirror ===
The CG short film "Cure Flora and the Mischievous Mirror" is a story centered on Cure Flora who becomes a super deformed character, and is the first attempt in Pretty Cure of a short story without dialogue. Washio said:

Girls who are slightly above the original target are attracted to SD [super deformed] characters. It is also a challenge to gain new fans by having people who have already graduated from Precure say "Kawaii yo ne!" again.

The film's director is veteran director Yukio Kaizawa. Kanako Miyamoto was the motion-capture actor of SD Cure Flora. Washio said that the reason for hiring Miyamoto was:

I was consulted by the CG staff for guidance on childish movements, and I was originally studying for cute movements and childish movements for the child role. [Miyamoto] was someone who knew Pretty Cure well. Her job had just resumed, so I asked her [to work in the film].

=== The Pumpkin Kingdom's Treasure ===
The cell-based feature length second part, The Pumpkin Kingdom's Treasure, is an ōdō-like story where the Cures have an isekai adventure.

It was directed by Akifumi Zako; Washio said of him:

I have been with [Zako] for three years in Toriko, but he has a warm perspective on those who are being stressed, and they will pick up their attitudes and spirits.

The scriptwriter is Kaori Yamagata, who is credited under the pen name Sakurako Akino (秋之桜子, Akino Sakurako).

Kana Hanazawa, who voices the film-only character Princess Pumplulu, said:

I was very happy to be involved in a show I've longed for. The Pumpkin Kingdom, the fairies, Pumplulu's costume, everything is pretty, and the film grasps the point where you think "It's a nice girl!!" I played carefully with Pumplulu's kind and strong heart.

The theme song for the second part, Kira Kira, was written by Every Little Thing. Member Kaori Mochida said:

I will do my best to keep the children sparkling and wonderful even when they grow up. I want to make it a song that reminds our generation of nostalgia and admiration.

Washio said:

I asked for ELT's music to be a mixture of strength and kindness, and to be perfectly in line with the image that the film aims for. I believe that the music that Mochida-san and Ichiro Ito-san will play together with the feelings of the Pretty Cure can play a wonderful harmony.

It was also announced that Hanazawa and Uegaki (described in the next section) will sing their songs in their respective part.

The film-only enhancement mode for this film, Mode Elegant Halloween (モードエレガント"ハロウィン", Mōdo Ereganto "Harowin"), is given to all four cures instead of, as for the films of between Suite and HappinessCharge, the main cure. The dress was designed by Eiko Kobayashi (小林栄子, Kobayashi Eiko), and was worn by Reina Triendl for the November 2015 issue of Otomodachi, and was exhibited at Shinjuku WALD9 and other places when the film was released.

=== Leff's Wonder Night! ===
Pretty Cure and Leff's Wonder Night! is an action work with a story expressed in CG as mentioned above. Director and character design were handled by Hiroshi Miyamoto. Washio said that:

I was working on the ending of HappinessCharge PreCure!, but the emotional part between the dances was wonderful. Despite the fun of the action, I look forward to seeing how much the emotional rendition enters.

According to Miyamoto, this work was originally not related to Pretty Cure, and was planned to be created as an original work on the theme of Halloween with Leff as the protagonist, but since the release of the Pretty Cure movie was on the day of Halloween, Takeshi Himi, who was in charge of production management, asked if it would be merged with that movie. Also, initially the story and Leff's appearance was different, but it later changed to its current form in Washio's opinion.

Hinata Uegaki was cast in the role of Leff. Uegaki had played a young Nala in the Shiki Theatre Company's production of The Lion King and was the winner of Kanjani no Shiwake∞'s "Musical Kids NO.1 Ketteisen".Ryusei Nakao voices the antagonist Night Pumpkin.

In December of the same year, Hiroshi Miyamoto was awarded the "1st CG WORLD Grand Prize" sponsored by CG WORLD magazine.

== Music ==
The opening song of both The Pumpkin Kingdom's Treasure and Leff's Wonder Night is Miracle Go! Princess PreCure, sung by Karin Isobe.

The ending song of The Pumpkin Kingdom's Treasure is "KIRA KIRA" by Every Little Thing, while the ending song of Leff's Wonder Night is Dreams are the Path to the Future by Rie Kitagawa.

The insert song of The Pumpkin Kingdom's Treasure is by Sharin' Miracle by Pumplulu (Kana Hanazawa), while the insert song of Leff's Wonder Night is Happy Happening♪ by Hinata Uegaki.

=== Second single ===
"Sharin' Miracle"

Single by Princess Pumplulu (Kana Hanazawa) and Leff (Hinata Uegaki)
- B-side: "Happy Happening♪"
- Released: October 28, 2015
- Genre: J-pop, Anime song
- Length: 17:22
- Label: Marvelous
- Composer: Hiroshi Takagi
- Lyricist: Shoko Omori

Sharin' Miracle/Happy Happening♪ is an insert song of the anime film Go! Princess Precure the Movie: Go! Go!! Splendid Triple Feature!!!. The single was released from Marvelous on October 28, 2015, The single topped at #114 in the Oricon Singles Chart on November 9, 2015.

Takaki described Sharin' Miracle as a "soft ballad" and Happy Happening♪ as a "lively, up-tempo song".

==== Track listing ====
1. Sharin' Miracle [4:50]
  Sung by: Pumplulu (Kana Hanazawa)
  Lyrics: Shoko Omori
  Work and Arrangement: Hiroshi Takagi
2. Happy Happening♪ [3:51]
  Sung by: Leff (Hinata Uegaki)
  Lyrics: Shoko Omori
  Work and Arrangement: Hiroshi Takagi
3. Sharin' Miracle (Original Karaoke) (Sharin' Miracle（オリジナル・カラオケ）, Sharin' Miracle (Orijinaru Karaoke)) [4:51]
4. Happy Happening♪ (Original Karaoke) (Happy Happening♪（オリジナル・カラオケ）, Sharin' Miracle (Orijinaru Karaoke)) [3:48]

=== Soundtrack ===
Go! Princess Precure the Movie: Go! Go!! Splendid Triple Feature!!!

Film score by Hiroki Takagi
- Released: November 18, 2015
- Recorded: 2015
- Genre: Soundtrack
- Length: 49:12
- Label: Marvelous

The film's original soundtrack was released on November 18, 2015. Hiroshi Takaki recorded the soundtrack. It topped at #271 in the Oricon Albums Chart on November 23, 2015.

Track listing
| No. | Title | Length |
|---|---|---|
| 1. | "Cure Flora and the Mischievous Mirror (キュアフローラといたずらかがみ, Kyua Furōra to itazura kagami)" | 04:04 |
| 2. | "Miracle Go! Princess Pretty Cure (Movie Size) (Miracle Go!プリンセスプリキュア（映画サイズ）, Miracle Go! Purinsesu Purikyua (eiga saizu))" | 01:50 |
| 3. | "Pumpkin Cafe (パンプキンカフェ, Panpukin Kafe)" | 00:36 |
| 4. | "A Zetsuborg appears!! (ゼツボーグ登場!!, Zetsubōgu tōjō!!)" | 00:29 |
| 5. | "Pretty Cure・Princess Engage! (プリキュア・プリンセスエンゲージ！, Purikyua - Purinsesu Engēji!)" | 01:44 |
| 6. | "Pumpkin Kingdom (パンプキン王国, Panpukin ōkoku)" | 01:10 |
| 7. | "The King who forgot his heart (心を忘れた王様, Kokoro o wasureta ōsama)" | 00:51 |
| 8. | "Pumplulu Princess (パンプルル姫, Panpururu-hime)" | 01:09 |
| 9. | "Princess Tournament (プリンセス大会, Purinsesu taikai)" | 00:47 |
| 10. | "Haruka, explore the Kingdom's Secrets (はるか、王国の秘密をさぐる, Haruka, ōkoku no himitsu o saguru)" | 00:58 |
| 11. | "Memories of Pumplulu (パンプルルの想い出, panpururu no omoide)" | 02:00 |
| 12. | "Warp's evil scheme (ウォープの邪悪なたくらみ, Wōpu no jaakuna takurami)" | 01:56 |
| 13. | "Haruka's challenge~Family of pudding (はるかの挑戦～家族のプリン, Haruka no chōsen ~ kazoku no purin)" | 03:07 |
| 14. | "Cure Flora vs Zetsuborg (キュアフローラ対ゼツボーグ, Kyua furōra tai zetsubōgu)" | 00:41 |
| 15. | "Warp's ridicule (あざ笑うウォープ, Azawarau Wōpu)" | 01:35 |
| 16. | "Warp vs Pretty Cure (ウォープ対プリキュア, Wōpu tai purikyua)" | 01:47 |
| 17. | "Warp's fear (ウォープの恐怖, Wōpu no kyōfu)" | 01:57 |
| 18. | "Sharin' Miracle (Movie Size) (Sharin' Miracle（映画サイズ）, Sharin' Miracle (Eiga saizu))" | 02:13 |
| 19. | "Halloween Miracle (ハロウィンの奇跡, Harowin no kiseki)" | 02:23 |
| 20. | "The true treasure (ほんとうの宝物, Hontō no takaramono)" | 02:13 |
| 21. | "KIRA KIRA (Movie Size) (KIRA KIRA（映画サイズ）, KIRA KIRA (Eiga saizu))" | 01:47 |
| 22. | "If you notice, there is... (気がつくと、そこは..., Kigatsuku to, soko wa...)" | 02:03 |
| 23. | "Happy Happening♪ (Movie Size) (Happy Happening♪（映画サイズ）, Happy Happening♪ (Eiga saizu))" | 02:11 |
| 24. | "Leff's wish (レフィの願い, Refi no negai)" | 02:08 |
| 25. | "Night Pumpkin vs Pretty Cure (ナイトパンプキン対プリキュア, Naito Panpukin tai Purikyua)" | 01:18 |
| 26. | "Aim for the top of the castle (城の上をめざせ, Shironoue o mezase)" | 01:07 |
| 27. | "Light appears again (光ふたたび, Hikari futatabi)" | 00:42 |
| 28. | "Dreams are the Path to the Future ~Cure Flora Ver.~ (Movie Size) (夢は未来への道～キュアフローラVer.～（映画サイズ）, Yume wa Mirai e no Michi ~Kyua Furōra Ver.~ (Eiga Saizu))" | 01:29 |

== Reception ==
It was released on 211 screens nationwide, and in its first two days (October 31) and (November 1), 118,292 people attended the film and a revenue of ¥129,383,300 was recorded; this was the first time Kōgyō Tsūshin ranked a Pretty Cure film at fourth-place in film attendance. It ranked #2 in Pia's first-day satisfaction survey. Its final revenue was ¥560 million.

== Home media and merchandise ==
The film's DVD/BD was released on March 16, 2016. On March 28 the special-version DVD and regular-version DVD charted at 32 and 73 in the Oricon DVD Chart, while the BR charted at 19 in the Blu-ray Disc Chart.

A tie-in paperback book, Go! Princess PreCure the Book: Hana and Leff's Adventure (物語 Go!プリンセスプリキュア 花とレフィの冒険, Monogatari Go! Purinsesu Purikyua Hana to Refi no Bōken) was released by Kodansha on March 15, 2017. Sakurako Akino said that she had talked to the person in charge of Kodansha's paperback division, a friend of her husband Keisuke Ishida, about a novelization of the film.
