= Katagami (disambiguation) =

Katagami is a city in Akita Prefecture, Japan.

Katagami may also refer to:

- Ise-katagami, the Japanese craft of making paper stencils for dyeing textiles

== People with the surname ==
- Daisuke Katagami (片上 大輔, born 1981), Japanese shogi player
- Noburu Katagami (片上 伸, 1884–1928), Japanese literary critic and academic
