= Hayasaka =

Hayasaka (written: 早坂) is a Japanese surname. Notable people with the surname include:

- Fumio Hayasaka (早坂 文雄, 1914–1955), Japanese composer
- Keisuke Hayasaka (早坂 圭介, born 1984), Japanese baseball player
- Miki Hayasaka (早坂 未紀, born 1955), Japanese illustrator and manga artist
- Ryota Hayasaka (早坂 良太, born 1985), Japanese footballer
- Yoshie Hayasaka (早坂 好恵, born 1975), Japanese actress and singer

== Fictional characters ==
- Ai Hayasaka (早坂 愛), a supporting character in the anime and manga series Kaguya-sama: Love Is War
