= Kihara (surname) =

Kihara (written: 木原) is a Japanese surname. Notable people with this surname include:

== People ==
- Hitoshi Kihara (木原 均; 1893–1986), Japanese geneticist
- Keisuke Kihara (木原 敬介; born 1939), Japanese politician
- Masakazu Kihara (木原 正和; born 1987), Japanese footballer
- Michiko Kihara (木原 美知子; 1948–2007), Japanese swimmer and TV actress
- Minoru Kihara, multiple people
- Miyuu Kihara (木原 美悠; born 2004), Japanese table tennis player
- Nobutoshi Kihara (木原 信敏; 1926–2011), Japanese engineer
- Ryōko Kihara (樹原 涼子), Japanese composer, pianist, music educator
- Ryuichi Kihara (木原 龍一; born 1992), a Japanese pair skater
- Seiji Kihara (木原 誠二; born 1970), Japanese politician
- Shichirō Kihara (木原 七郎; 1884–1951), Japanese politician
- Shigeyuki Kihara, Japanese-Samoan artist
- Toshie Kihara (木原 敏江; born 1948), Japanese manga artist

== Fictional characters ==
- Nayuta Kihara, Gensei Kihara, Therestina Kihara Lifeline, Kagun Kihara, Amata Kihara and many others, characters in the light novel series A Certain Magical Index
- Tsumugu Kihara, one of the main characters of Nagi no Asukara
