= Black Rain (1989 Japanese film) =

- Film poster
- Directed by: Shōhei Imamura
- Written by: Shōhei Imamura; Toshirō Ishido
- Based on: Black Rain by Masuji Ibuse
- Produced by: Hisashi Iino
- Starring: Yoshiko Tanaka; Kazuo Kitamura
- Cinematography: Takashi Kawamata
- Edited by: Hajime Okayasu
- Music by: Tōru Takemitsu
- Production companies: Hayashibara Group; Imamura Productions
- Distributed by: Toei
- Release date: 13 May 1989 (Japan)
- Running time: 123 minutes
- Country: Japan
- Language: Japanese

Black Rain (Japanese: 黒い雨, Hepburn: Kuroi ame) is a 1989 Japanese drama film directed by Shōhei Imamura, based on the 1965 novel of the same name by Masuji Ibuse. The story centers on the aftermath of the atomic bombing of Hiroshima and its effect on a surviving family.

Lead actress Yoshiko Tanaka, who plays Yasuko in the film, was widely recognized for her valuable performance in Black Rain. She won Best Actress at the 1989 Hochi Film Awards, as well as Best Lead Actress at the 13th Japan Academy Awards.

== Plot ==
In 1945 Japan, half-orphan Yasuko, who lives with her uncle Shigematsu and his wife Shigeko in Hiroshima, is in the middle of moving family belongings to the house of an acquaintance in the vicinity, when an atomic bomb is dropped on the city. She returns to the city by boat and gets into a black rain, a fallout resulting from the bombing. After Yasuko is re-united with her uncle and aunt, the trio heads for the factory where her uncle works to escape the spreading fires. Their route is marked by ruins, scattered corpses, and severely burnt survivors.

5 years later, Yasuko lives with her uncle, aunt and her uncle's mother in Fukuyama. As she has long reached the age when a woman should get married by tradition, Shigematsu and Shigeko try to find a husband for her. However, all prospects' families withdraw their proposal when they hear of Yasuko's presence in Hiroshima on the day of the bombing, fearing that she might become ill or be unable to give birth to healthy children. Yasuko eventually accepts her situation and decides to stay with her uncle's family, even when her father, who remarried, offers her to live in his house.

Shigematsu witnesses his friends, all hibakusha suffering from radiation sickness, die one after another, while also his, his wife's and niece's health is slowly deteriorating. Yasuko starts feeling close to Yuichi, a young man from the neighbourhood who is suffering from war trauma. When Yuichi's mother asks for Shigematsu's approval of her son marrying Yasuko, he is indignant at first because of Yuichi's mental illness, but later agrees. Shortly after, Yasuko, already suffering from a tumor, starts losing her hair and is sent to the hospital. Shigematsu watches the departing ambulance, hoping for a rainbow to appear which would indicate that she will recover.

== Cast ==
- Yoshiko Tanaka as Yasuko. A 20-year-old woman who was raised by her Aunt and Uncle since she was very young. Although Yasuko was not in the direct path of the atomic bombing, she was rained on by the nuclear fallout while crossing over the Inland Sea (瀬戸内海) in a small boat.
- Kazuo Kitamura as Shigematsu Shizuma
- Etsuko Ichihara as Shigeko Shizuma
- Shōichi Ozawa as Shokichi
- Norihei Miki as Kotaro
- Keisuke Ishida as Yuichi
- Hisako Hara as Kin
- Masato Yamada as Tatsu
- Sanshō Shinsui as Nojima
- Junko Hori as woman of Nojima's family
- Taiji Tonoyama as priest

== Filming ==
Black Rain distinguishes itself by employing a documentary-like realism to depict the physical and emotional toll of the atomic bomb. Imamura, known for his focus on marginalized individuals and unflinching portrayals of Japanese society, approached the project with a commitment to authenticity, capturing the lingering trauma of the hibakusha while rejecting overt melodrama. He sought to emphasize the mundane yet deeply human aspects of survivors' lives, a choice that aligns with his broader cinematic philosophy of exploring the lives of the socially marginalized.

The film was shot in black-and-white, a deliberate stylistic choice that not only reflects the historical setting but also emphasizes the stark, haunting nature of the narrative. This decision underscores the bleakness of the survivors’ reality, contrasting with the vivid depictions of atomic bomb destruction often seen in other works. Imamura’s use of monochrome echoes his aim to evoke the historical and emotional weight of the events.

== Themes ==
Throughout the film, the story of the consequences of the bombing of Hiroshima are portrayed in graphic detail, with journals and firsthand accounts of the victims of the Hiroshima atomic bombing in order to shed light on how terrible nuclear weapons can be for innocent civilians. One of these victims recollected that he “was three years old at the time of the bombing. {He couldn’t} remember much, but {he did} recall that {his} surroundings turned blindingly white…Then, pitch darkness. {He} was buried alive under the house. {His} face was misshapen. {He} was certain that {he} was dead.” This is reflected in a scene where bodies were engulfed by a blinding light followed by the insurmountable suffering of the masses. There is another story of a woman's father who was in the blast and suffered from many of the same long-term effects of the bomb. In both the account and in the movie, hair falls out of the victims’ heads and they slowly die of radiation poisoning.

Some of the accounts described the horrors of the surroundings and the conditions of the bodies after the bombing. Yoshiro Yamawaki and his brothers were going to check on their father who was working in a factory. The air quality is described in both the witness’ story and the movie as being horrible, smelling of rotten flesh. They passed many misshapen bodies and some who had their ,“skin peeling off just like that of an over - ripe peach, exposing the white fat underneath.’” When the uncle of the main character exits the train station, there are black skinned bodies everywhere and countless others who are so disfigured that their own family could not even recognize them, which ultimately reveals in dramatic detail the lifelong negative effects of nuclear weapons on a population.

== Production ==
During production, when the actor Shoichi Ozawa was filming a scene for the movie, he accidentally fell into the rice paddy and broke his arm, causing the filming to temporarily stop, so he appeared wearing plaster, which is not depicted in the original book.

Director Shohei Imamura later commented on the ending of the film, in which the little girl suffers from the radiation and starts to hallucinate and her uncle brings her to a pond, calling it "an extremely beautiful and peaceful scene to see". The composer of the film, Toru Takemitsu, asked Imamura to extend that specific scene, because he considered it very emotional and touching. However, Imamura decided not to take this advice, believing that the movie should not be too emotional and that expanding the ending would compromise its historical accuracy.

== Reception ==
Black Rain met with mostly positive reviews. Roger Ebert of the Chicago Sun-Times gave it 3½ of 4 stars, praising its "beautifully textured" black-and-white photography and pointing out that its purpose was not to deliver an anti-nuclear message, but that it was "a film about how the survivors of that terrible day internalized their experiences". Geoff Andrew, writing for Time Out, stated that "despite the largely sensitive depiction of waste, suffering and despair, the often ponderous pacing and the script's solemnity tend to work against emotional involvement". Film scholar Alexander Jacoby observed an "almost Ozu-like quietism", citing Black Rain as an example of the "mellowed" Imamura in his later years. Film historian Donald Richie pointed out the film's "warmth, sincerity and compassion".

Black Rain was described by audiences as inconsistent and unpredictable. Its reception differed in other countries, where the English or French subtitles did not accurately convey the film's true message. Film clubs have used Black Rain to display, "Neoliberalism has done an exceptional job of convincing us that history is something in the past that we read about in books. This is a lie. History is unfolding around us constantly".

The common compromise of film watchers is that this film displays the rough and hidden secrets of the atomic bombings. Many in the West have been sheltered from the reality of those in Japan during this time, this film describes and enacts a portrayal of what life could have been like, creating an opportune viewing of different aspects of life.

=== Awards ===
- Japanese Academy Awards 1990: Best Actress, Best Cinematography, Best Director, Best Editing, Best Film, Best Lighting, Best Music Score, Best Screenplay, Best Supporting Actress (Etsuko Ichihara)
- Blue Ribbon Award 1990: Best Actress
- Cannes Film Festival 1989: Prize of the Ecumenical Jury – Special Mention, Technical Grand Prize
- Film Fest Gent 1989: Grand Prix, Best Film
- Film Fest Gent 1989: Georges Delerue Prize, Golden Spur
- Hochi Film Awards 1989: Best Actress
- Kinema Junpo Award 1990: Best Actress, Best Director, Best Film
- Mainichi Film Concours 1990: Best Actress, Best Art Direction, Best Film
- Sant Jordi Awards 1991: Best Foreign Film
