= Black Rain (novel) =

1965 novel by Masuji Ibuse

- First US edition
- Author: Masuji Ibuse
- Original title: 黒い雨 (Kuroi Ame)
- Translator: John Bester
- Language: Japanese
- Genre: Historical, war novel
- Publication date: 1966
- English publication date: 2001
- Media type: Print (Hardback and paperback)
- ISBN: 0-87011-364-X
- OCLC: 264049426

Black Rain (黒い雨, Kuroi Ame) is a novel by Japanese author Masuji Ibuse. Ibuse began serializing Black Rain in the magazine Shincho in January 1965. The novel is based on historical records of the devastation caused by the atomic bombing of Hiroshima.

== Plot ==
Black Rain is told through the diary entries of Shizuma Shigematsu and other characters during August 6–15, 1957, Hiroshima, and at the time of narration, Shigematsu and his wife Shigeko are the guardians of their niece Yasuko. They feel obligated to find a suitable husband for her, and by the start of the novel, three earlier attempts to arrange a match had already failed because of rumors that she had radiation sickness from exposure to "black rain," radioactive precipitation that had fallen when the immense firestorm caused by the nuclear explosion seeded the clouds over Hiroshima, causing the radioactive material to fall back down as rain. Fear and disgust of radiation sickness and those who have it are two of the main themes throughout the story. Though Shigematsu's journal entries attempt to disprove his niece's sickness by demonstrating that she was not in Hiroshima during the blast, in the end it turns out that Yasuko had gone there immediately afterward to find her parents and was indeed sickened by the "Black Rain".

== Adaptations ==
Director Shohei Imamura directed a film adaptation of the Japanese novel in 1989.

== See also ==
- List of books about nuclear issues
- List of films about nuclear issues
