= Masuji Ibuse =

Japanese author (1898–1993)

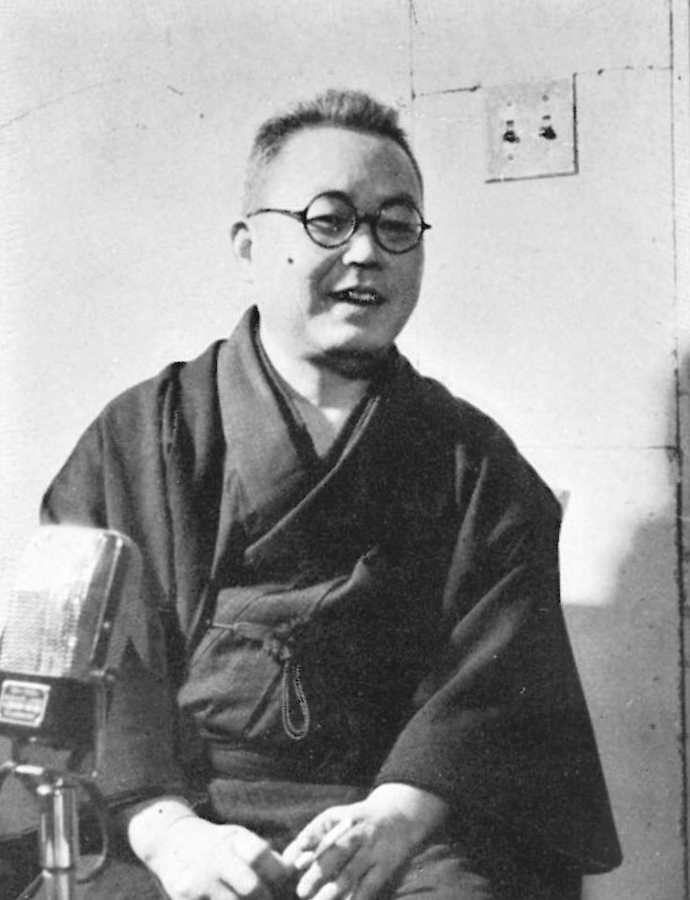
- Ibuse in 1952
- Born: February 15, 1898; Fukuyama, Hiroshima
- Died: July 10, 1993 (aged 95); Tokyo, Japan
- Occupation: novelist
- Writing career
- Years active: 1923—1981
- Notable work: Black Rain
- Notable awards: Noma Prize; Order of Cultural Merit; Naoki Prize

Masuji Ibuse (井伏 鱒二, Ibuse Masuji; 15 February 1898 – 10 July 1993) was a Japanese author. His novel Black Rain, about the bombing of Hiroshima, was awarded the Noma Prize and the Order of Cultural Merit.

== Early life and education ==
Ibuse was born in 1898 to a landowning family in the village of Kamo, now part of Fukuyama, Hiroshima.

Ibuse failed his entrance exam to Hiroshima Middle School, but in 1911 he gained admission to Fukuyama Middle School. Fukuyama Middle School was an elite academy and was linked to eminent scholars. Fukuyama's teachers boasted about the school's pedigree, but Ibuse was unconcerned. Ibuse spoke of this school as following Western ideals; in The First Half of My Life, he said that the school emphasized Dutch learning and French military exercises. Ibuse was made fun of at this school, and he avoided wearing glasses in an effort to avoid ridicule.

Although Ibuse enjoyed the Western influences in his education, his grandfather arranged for a private tutorial in Chinese literature. However, this training stopped when Ibuse's tutor died. His school often forbade students from reading fictional literature, which prevented Ibuse from reading many popular works during this period.

However, Ibuse did read works by Shimazaki Toson and Mori Ogai. In 1916, Ibuse wrote a letter to Ogai using the pseudonym Kuchiki Sansuke. Ogai believed Sansuke was a famous scholar and sent a reply to Sansuke expressing his gratitude. While in middle school, Ibuse's brother Fumio submitted a poem to the Tokyo journal Shusai Bundan using Ibuse's name. Ibuse was reprimanded by the principal of Fukuyama Middle School, but he was also praised. He received two fan letters.

The reprimand Ibuse received influenced him to express an interest in the visual arts. Ibuse studied the arts at Fukuyama Middle School. He enjoyed the classes but did not feel he wanted to commit his life to becoming an artist. Ibuse graduated from middle school in 1917. Afterwards he sought to continue his artistic endeavours under the tutorship of established painter Hashimoto Kansetsu, but Kansetsu denied him this opportunity.

== University education ==
In 1917, at nineteen years of age, Ibuse began studying at Waseda University in Tokyo. His choice was greatly influenced by his brother Fumio and by a friend of his, Yamane Masakazu. Ibuse was initially interested in studying poetry and painting but was encouraged to study fiction and ended up specialising in French literature.

Upon moving to Tokyo, Ibuse was ambivalent about leaving the countryside of Fukuyama and moving to the big city. Ibuse described this experience in Thoughts One February Ninth: "sometimes I feel that half of me wants to return to the country while the other half would like to cling to Tokyo until the very end." Tokyo appeared surreal to Ibuse. He felt lonely and missed his Fukuyama home. Nevertheless, Ibuse decided to stay in a boardinghouse near Waseda University. He often moved but always stayed near Waseda and visited Fukuyama only occasionally.

During his stay at Waseda University, Ibuse witnessed political unrest and radicalism of university students. However, the political ideologies of the era did not appeal to Ibuse. He was dissatisfied with the continual strikes and revolts. In Tokyo, Ibuse befriended eccentric young men and literary hopefuls but often found inspiration in his loneliness and encounters with Geisha. He went so far as to pawn a watch to try to understand the needfulness of writers.

In 1918, Ibuse met naturalist writer Iwano Homei. Homei's literature appealed to Ibuse and later influenced some of Ibuse's literary works. Ibuse also befriended student Aoki Nampachi at Waseda. Aoki was a mentor and a great influence on the writings of Ibuse. Aoki's influence can be found in "The Carp", where Ibuse idealizes Aoki's friendship and represents his feelings towards this friendship as a carp. Ibuse was also influenced by the works of Shakespeare and Bashō, as well as by French literature. Ibuse's first literary works were in prose, and he started writing his first essays in 1922 shortly after the death of Aoki.

Ibuse witnessed one of his professors, Noburu Katagami, an epileptic, at the onset of a seizure. Following quarrels with two of his professors and the incident with Katagami, Ibuse withdrew from both Waseda and art school. Embarrassed, Katagami campaigned against Ibuse's readmission to Waseda University.

== Literary career ==
Ibuse began publishing stories in the early 1920s. One of his first contributions was to the magazine Seiki. It was originally written for Aoki in 1919 and titled "The Salamander". In 1923 it was renamed "Confinement". Ibuse began to be recognised in the late 1920s, when his work was favorably mentioned by some of Japan's top critics. With the publication of Salamander in 1929, he began to write in a style characterized by a unique blend of humour and bitterness.

He was awarded the Naoki Prize for John Manjirou, the Cast-Away: his Life and Adventure and continued to publish works filled with warmth and kindness, while at the same time showing keen powers of observation. The themes he employed were usually intellectual fantasies that used animal allegories, historical fiction, and the country life.

During World War II Ibuse worked for the government as a propaganda writer.

Ibuse was known and appreciated for most of his career, although it wasn't until after the war that he became famous. He won the inaugural Yomiuri Prize in 1949 for Honjitsu kyūshin (本日休診, No Consultations Today). In 1966 he published his novel Black Rain, which won him international acclaim and several awards including the Noma Prize and the Order of Cultural Merit, the highest honor that can be bestowed upon a Japanese author. The novel draws its material from the bombing of Hiroshima and the title refers to the nuclear fallout. Ibuse was not present at the time of the bombing, but he used the diaries of survivors to construct his narrative. An earlier story by Ibuse, Kakitsubata ("The Crazy Iris", first published in 1951), deals with similar themes.

Ibuse died in a hospital at Tokyo on July 10, 1993 of pneumonia.

== Selected works ==
- Yu Hei Confinement, 1923
- Sanshouo, 1929 – Salamander and Other Stories (trans. by John Bester)
- Sazanami Gunki, 1930–1938 – Waves: A War Diary
- Shigotobeya, 1931
- Kawa, 1931–1932 – The River
- Zuihitsu, 1933
- Keirokushu, 1936 – Miscellany
- Jon Manjiro Hyoryuki, 1937 – John Manjiro, the Cast-Away: His Life and Adventures
- Shukin Ryoko, 1937
- Sazanami Gunki, 1938 – trans. in Waves: Two Short Novels
- Tajinko Mura, 1939
- Shigureto Jokei, 1941
- Ibuse Masuji Zuihitsu Zenshu, 1941 (3 vols.)
- Hana No Machi, 1942 – City of Flowers
- Chushu Meigetsu, 1942
- Aru Shojo No Senji Nikki, 1943 – A Young Girl's Wartime Diary
- Gojinka, 1944
- Wabisuke, 1946 – trans. in Waves: Two Short Novels
- Magemono, 1946
- Oihagi No Hanashi, 1947
- Ibuse Masuji Senshu, 1948 (9 vols)
- Yohai Taicho, 1950 – Lieutenant Lookeast and other stories
- Kakitsubata, 1951 – The Crazy Iris
- Kawatsuri, 1952
- Honjitsu Kyushin, 1952 – No Consultations Today
- Ibuse Masuji Sakuhinshu, 1953 (5 vols.)
- Hyomin Usaburo, 1954–1955
- Nyomin Nanakamado, 1955
- Kanreki No Koi, 1957
- Ekimae Ryokan, 1957
- Nanatsu No Kaidō, 1957
- Chinpindo Shujin, 1959
- Bushu Hachigatajo, 1963
- Mushinjo, 1963
- Ibuse Masuji Zenshu, 1964 (2 vols.)
- Kuroi Ame, 1966 – Black Rain (trans. by John Bester)
- Gendai Bungaku Taikei, 1966
- Hanseiki, 1970 – The First Half of My Life
- Shincho Nihonbungaku, 1970
- Tsuribito, 1970
- Ibuse Masuji Zenshu, 1975 (14 vols.)
- Choyochu No Koto, 1977–1980 – Under Arms
- Ogikubo Fudoki, 1981 – An Ogikybo Almanac

== Adaptations ==
- Black Rain, 1989, dir. by Shohei Imamura
