= Keisuke Ishida =

Japanese actor and voice actor

- 石田 圭祐
- Born: August 15, 1955 (age 70); Kanagawa Prefecture, Japan
- Education: Waseda University
- Occupations: Actor; voice actor
- Years active: 1976–present
- Agent: Bungakuza
- Height: 181 cm (5 ft 11 in)
- Spouse: Kaori Yamagata

Keisuke Ishida (石田 圭祐, Ishida Keisuke; born August 15, 1955) is a Japanese actor and voice actor from Kanagawa Prefecture. He is affiliated with Bungakuza.

== Filmography ==
=== Film ===
- Black Rain (1989) (Yūichi Okazakiya)

=== Television drama ===
- Taiyō ni Hoero! (1986) (Shinya Itō)
- Abarenbō Shōgun V (1993)
- Tokusou Robo Janperson (1993) (Detective Sekichō)
- Yoshitsune (2005) (Igara)
- Kaze no Hate (2007)

=== Television animation ===
- Ghost in the Shell: Stand Alone Complex - Solid State Society (2006) (Jin Munei)
- Naruto (2006) (Unkai)
- Ghost Hunt (2007) (Taizō Yoshimi)
- Stitch! ~The Mischievous Alien's Great Adventure~ (2009) (Captain Rock)
- Blast of Tempest (2012) (Utsui)
- Yu-Gi-Oh! Zexal (2012) (Chukichi)

=== Video games ===
- Crash Bandicoot: Warped (1998) (Dingodile)
- Crash Team Racing (1999) (Dingodile)
- Crash Bash (2000) (Dingodile)
- Crash Bandicoot 4: It's About Time (Dingodile)

=== Dubbing roles ===
==== Live-action ====
- After Earth (Commander Velan (Glenn Morshower))
- Aquaman (King Atlan (Graham McTavish))
- Childhood's End (Karellen (Charles Dance))
- Damages (Phil Gray (Michael Nouri))
- Existenz (The Seminar Leader (Christopher Eccleston))
- Gifted (Greg Cullen (Glenn Plummer))
- Gone Baby Gone (Detective Nick Poole (John Ashton))
- Ground Control (2008 DVD edition) (T.C. Bryant (Bruce McGill))
- Infernal Affairs III (Wong Chi-shing (Anthony Wong))
- Infestation (Albert (Wesley Thompson))
- John Wick: Chapter 4 (The Harbinger (Clancy Brown))
- Kit Kittredge: An American Girl (Mr. Jefferson Jasper Rene Berk (Stanley Tucci))
- Kong: Skull Island (Hank Marlow (John C. Reilly))
- The Last Time (Leguzza (Michael Lerner))
- The Marine 2 (Damo (Temuera Morrison))
- Music and Lyrics (Chris Riley (Brad Garrett))
- The Newton Boys (Dock Newton (Vincent D'Onofrio))
- No Time to Die (Felix Leiter (Jeffrey Wright))
- North Face (2020 BS Tokyo edition) (Emil Landauer (Erwin Steinhauer))
- Oldboy (No Joo-hwan (Ji Dae-han))
- Raiders of the Lost Ark (2012 DVD edition) (René Belloq (Paul Freeman))
- The Returned (Jérôme Séguret (Frédéric Pierrot))
- Roswell (Kivar (Spence Decker))
- The Salvation (Delarue (Jeffrey Dean Morgan))
- Saturday Night (David Tebet (Willem Dafoe))
- Saving Private Ryan (2002 TV Asahi edition) (Technical Sergeant Michael Horvath (Tom Sizemore))
- Scenes from a Marriage (Peter (Corey Stoll))
- Spider-Man (Wrestling promoter (Larry Joshua))
- Spider-Man 3 (Sandman (Thomas Haden Church))
- Snatch (Abraham "Cousin Abe" Denovitz (Dennis Farina))
- Transamerica (Calvin Many Goats (Graham Greene))
- Without a Trace ("The Line") (Bear (Larry Joshua))

==== Animation ====
- Arthur Christmas (Malcolm "Santa" Claus)
