= Kira Kira/Akari =

Single by Every Little Thing
- Released: November 4, 2015
- Genre: J-pop
- Label: avex trax
- Songwriters: Kaori Mochida, Mito (Kira Kira)

Every Little Thing singles chronology
"ANATA TO" (2015)	"Kira Kira/Akari" (2015)	"Mainichi" (2016)

Music video
- Every Little Thing "Kira Kira" on YouTube

Kira Kira/Akari is the 47th single by the Japanese pop group Every Little Thing released on November 4, 2015. It was released on two editions: a CD Edition and a CD+DVD Edition. Kira Kira is used as the theme song for the first part of the Toei Animation film "Go! Princess PreCure The Movie: Go! Go!! Splendid Triple Feature!!!" while Akari is used for the Hoshizaki Electric commercials.

== Development ==
The single was first announced on September 9, 2015, with Toei crediting the duo for the official theme song of the film. Kaori Mochida and guitarist Ichirō Itō are creating the song for the film, which was currently untitled. In the group's latest blog, the song was revealed as "Kira Kira" with the song be written by Clammbon's head bassist Mito. The song was then used for the commercials of the film on October 5, 2015 while the limited-edition version of the single includes a Cure Flora Data Carddass card.

== Track List ==
=== CD ===
1. Kira Kira
2. Akari
3. Kira Kira (Instrumental)
4. Akari (Instrumental)

=== DVD ===
1. Kira Kira (Video Clip)

== See also ==
- Go! Princess PreCure
