= Noburu Katagami =

Japanese literary critic

- 片上 伸
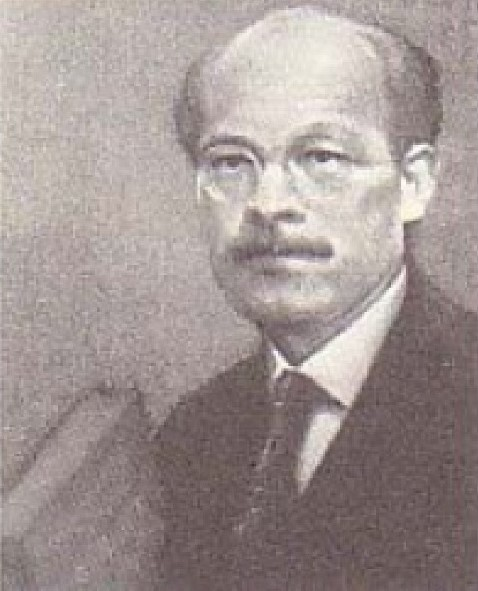
- Born: November 20, 1884; Imabari, Ehime, Empire of Japan
- Died: March 5, 1928 (aged 43)
- Education: Tōkyō Professional School
- Employer: Tōkyō Professional Schoo
- Known for: Researching Russian literature

Noburu Katagami (片上 伸, Katagami Noburu; February 20, 1884 – March 5, 1928) was a Japanese literary critic and a professor of Russian literature at Waseda University. He is also known as Tengen Katagami (片上天絃; later 片上天弦).

== Biography ==
Katagami was born in Imabari, Ehime and graduated Waseda University in 1906, majoring English literature. He supported naturalism as an editor of a journal Waseda bungaku. He became a professor at Waseda University in 1910, but later he became interested in Russian literature and traveled to Russia to study Russian literature (1915-1918). In 1920, when Waseda University created a department of Russian literature, Katagami was appointed as the chief professor.

Katagami was also a translator; he translated two editions of Don Quixote, first in 1915 and then in 1927.

Masuji Ibuse, who was one of his students at that time, witnessed Katagami, an epileptic, at the onset of a seizure. Following quarrels with two of his professors, and the incident with Katagami, Ibuse withdrew from both Waseda and art school. Embarrassed, Katagami campaigned against Ibuse's readmission to Waseda University.

Katagami's literature theory became the basis of proletarian literature in Japan. Katagami also introduced Don Quixote to the Soviet statesman Anatoly Lunacharsky.
