= Keisuke Hayasaka =

Japanese baseball player (born 1984)

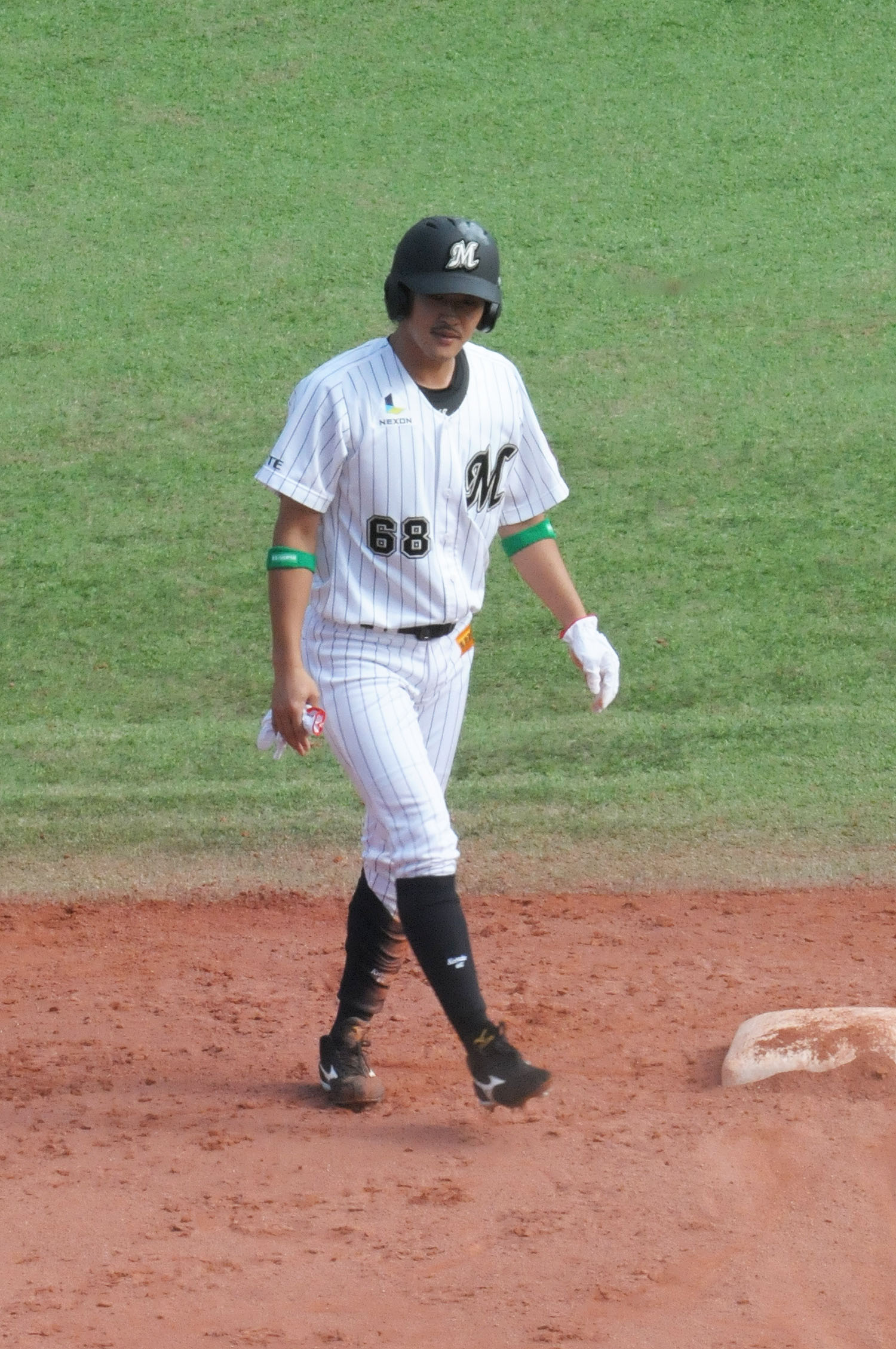
- Hayasaka with the Chiba Lotte Marines
- Infielder
- Born: June 19, 1984 (age 42)
- Bats: Both Throws: Right

NPB debut
- 2003, for the Chiba Lotte Marines

NPB statistics (through 2014)
- Batting average: .196
- Home runs: 3
- RBI: 26
- Stats at Baseball Reference

Teams
- Chiba Lotte Marines (2003, 2006–2014)

Keisuke Hayasaka (早坂 圭介, born June 19, 1984) is a Japanese former professional baseball infielder. He played with the Chiba Lotte Marines in Nippon Professional Baseball in 2003 and from 2006 to 2014.
