= Keisuke Kihara =

Japanese politician (born 1939)

- 木原 敬介

Mayor of Sakai
- In office 8 October 2001 – 7 October 2009
- Preceded by: Hideo Hataya
- Succeeded by: Osami Takeyama

Personal details
- Born: 5 November 1939 (age 86) Toyonaka, Osaka, Japan
- Party: Independent
- Education: University of Osaka

Keisuke Kihara (木原 敬介, Kihara Keisuke; born 5 November 1939 in Toyonaka) is a former mayor of Sakai in Japan. He was first elected in 2001.
