= Keisuke Kumakiri =

Japanese photographer (1934–2020)

Keisuke Kumakiri (熊切 圭介, Kumakiri Keisuke; 1934 - 27 November 2020) was a Japanese photographer.
