= 2013–14 FC Krylia Sovetov Samara season =

Krylia Sovetov
2013–14 season
- Chairman: Ramzan Kadyrov
- Manager: Gadzhi Gadzhiyev until 8 August 2013; Aleksandr Tsygankov; 8 August 2013-5 May 2014; Vladimir Kukhlevskiy (caretaker); 8 August 2013-5 May 2014
- Stadium: Metallurg Stadium
- Russian Premier League: 14th (relegated)
- Russian Cup: Fifth round vs Sokol Saratov
- Top goalscorer: League: Luis Caballero (6); All: Luis Caballero (6)
Home colours	Away colours

The 2013–14 FC Krylia Sovetov Samara season was the 20th, and final, successive season that Krylia Sovetov played in the Russian Premier League, the highest tier of football in Russia. They finished the season in 14th place, going into a Relegation Play-off against FC Torpedo Moscow which they lost 0–2 on aggregate. They also reached the Fifth Round of the Russian Cup, going out on penalties to FC Sokol Saratov.

== Squad ==
Note: Flags indicate national team as defined under FIFA eligibility rules; some limited exceptions apply. Players may hold more than one non-FIFA nationality.

No.	Pos.	Nation	Player
1	GK	RUS	Denis Vavilin
2	MF	BLR	Stanislaw Drahun
3	DF	BRA	Nadson
4	DF	RUS	Ivan Taranov
5	DF	GEO	Aleksandr Amisulashvili
6	DF	BRA	Bruno Teles
7	MF	RUS	Pyotr Nemov
8	FW	BLR	Sergei Kornilenko
9	FW	PAR	Luis Caballero
11	MF	RUS	Aleksandr Pavlenko
14	MF	RUS	Aleksandr Yeliseyev
15	DF	RUS	Ibragim Tsallagov
15	MF	RUS	Viktor Kuzmichyov
18	DF	BLR	Dmitry Verkhovtsov

No.	Pos.	Nation	Player
20	MF	RUS	Igor Semshov
21	MF	RUS	Ruslan Adzhindzhal
22	DF	HAI	Réginal Goreux
23	MF	RUS	Yevgeni Balyaikin
28	DF	GER	Felicio Brown Forbes
33	DF	RUS	Dmitri Yatchenko
45	DF	RUS	Aleksei Kontsedalov
63	FW	RUS	Artyom Delkin
67	MF	RUS	Emin Makhmudov
77	MF	RUS	Alan Chochiyev
82	GK	BLR	Syarhey Vyeramko
84	MF	RUS	Roman Vorobyov
88	DF	RUS	Valeri Pochivalin
99	GK	SVK	Ján Mucha

== Transfers ==
=== Summer ===
In: Note: Flags indicate national team as defined under FIFA eligibility rules; some limited exceptions apply. Players may hold more than one non-FIFA nationality.

No.	Pos.	Nation	Player
3	DF	BRA	Nadson (from (Belgium) Genk)
10	FW	PAR	Pablo Zeballos (end of loan to (Ecuador) Emelec)
11	MF	RUS	Aleksandr Pavlenko (from (Russia) Terek Grozny)
20	MF	RUS	Igor Semshov (from (Russia) Dynamo Moscow)
21	MF	RUS	Ruslan Adzhindzhal (from (Russia) Volga Nizhny Novgorod)
28	DF	GER	Felicio Brown Forbes (from (Germany) FSV Frankfurt)
99	GK	SVK	Ján Mucha (from (England) Everton)

Out: Note: Flags indicate national team as defined under FIFA eligibility rules; some limited exceptions apply. Players may hold more than one non-FIFA nationality.

No.	Pos.	Nation	Player
5	DF	GEO	Gia Grigalava (to (Russia) Anzhi Makhachkala)
11	MF	RUS	Roman Grigoryan (to (Russia) Vityaz Podolsk)
13	MF	RUS	Shamil Lakhiyalov (Retired)
14	FW	RUS	Igor Portnyagin (end of loan from (Russia) Rubin Kazan)
19	DF	CMR	Benoît Angbwa (to (Russia) Anzhi Makhachkala)
21	DF	RUS	Dmitri Golubev (on loan to (Russia) Mordovia Saransk)
30	GK	RUS	Oleg Baklov (to (Russia) Syzran-2003 Syzran)
38	DF	RUS	Stanislav Bravin (to (Russia) Tekstilshchik Ivanovo)
44	MF	RUS	Konstantin Kertanov (to (Russia) Kuban Krasnodar)
51	MF	RUS	Viktor Svezhov (on loan to (Russia) Torpedo Moscow)
71	GK	RUS	Aleksei Kozlov (on loan to (Russia) Kaluga)
74	MF	RUS	Sergei Nakhlyostkin (to (Russia) Sibir-2 Novosibirsk)
78	GK	RUS	Aleksandr Makarov (to (Russia) Dynamo St. Petersburg)
83	DF	FRA	Steeve Joseph-Reinette (end of contract)
87	MF	RUS	Ilya Maksimov (to (Russia) Anzhi Makhachkala)
93	MF	RUS	Artyom Bykov (to (Russia) Lada-Togliatti Togliatti)
—	GK	ALG	Raïs M'Bolhi (to (Bulgaria) CSKA Sofia, previously on loan to (France) Gazélec Ajaccio)

=== Winter ===
In: Note: Flags indicate national team as defined under FIFA eligibility rules; some limited exceptions apply. Players may hold more than one non-FIFA nationality.

No.	Pos.	Nation	Player
33	DF	RUS	Dmitri Yatchenko (from (Russia) Terek Grozny)
77	MF	RUS	Alan Chochiyev (from (Russia) Lokomotiv Moscow)
88	DF	RUS	Valeri Pochivalin (from (Russia) Zenit Penza)

Out: Note: Flags indicate national team as defined under FIFA eligibility rules; some limited exceptions apply. Players may hold more than one non-FIFA nationality.

No.	Pos.	Nation	Player
10	FW	PAR	Pablo Zeballos (to (Brazil) Botafogo)

== Competitions ==
=== Russian Premier League ===
==== Matches ====
6 July 2013 1	Krylia Sovetov	1–2	Spartak Moscow	Samara
19:30 MSK (UTC+4)	Caballero 61'	Summary	Costa; Movsisyan 21' (pen.)	Stadium: Metallurg Stadion; Attendance: 20,530; Referee: Sergey Ivanov

22 July 2013 2	CSKA Moscow	2–1	Krylia Sovetov	Moscow
20:00 MSK (UTC+4)	Schennikov (red card) 8'; Doumbia 67', 79' (pen.)	Summary	Maksimov 13' (pen.)	Stadium: Arena Khimki; Attendance: 9,000; Referee: Sergey Kuznetsov

28 July 2013 3	Krylia Sovetov	1–1	Anzhi Makhachkala	Samara
18:30 MSK (UTC+4)	Maksimov 82'	Summary	Eto'o 59'	Stadium: Metallurg Stadion; Attendance: 21,345; Referee: Timur Arslanbekov

4 August 2013 4	Amkar Perm	0–0	Krylia Sovetov	Perm
16:00 MSK (UTC+4)		Summary		Stadium: Zvezda Stadium; Attendance: 12,300; Referee: Alexey Nikolaev

18 August 2013 5	Krylia Sovetov	1–0	Tom Tomsk	Samara
21:00 OMST (UTC+7)	I.Maksimov (red card) 56'; Tsallagov 61'	Summary		Stadium: Metallurg Stadium; Attendance: 16,074; Referee: Mikhail Belov

25 August 2013 6	Rubin Kazan'	1–1	Krylia Sovetov	Kazan
17:30 MSK (UTC+4)	Karadeniz 10'	Summary	Tsallagov 45+1'	Stadium: Central Stadium; Attendance: 10,024; Referee: Mikhail Vilkov

1 September 2013 7	Krylia Sovetov	0–0	Kuban Krasnodar	Samara
18:00 MSK (UTC+4)		Summary		Stadium: Metallurg Stadium; Attendance: 12,340; Referee: Vladimir Seldyakov

14 September 2013 8	Krasnodar	1–1	Krylia Sovetov	Krasnodar
18:00 MSK (UTC+4)	Kaleshin 9'	Summary	Tsallagov 89'	Stadium: Kuban Stadium; Attendance: 8,750; Referee: Igor Fedotov

21 September 2013 9	Krylia Sovetov	1–1	Ural	Samara, Russia
16:00 MSK (UTC+4)	Amisulashvili 19'	Summary	Gogniyev 11'	Stadium: Metallurg Stadium; Attendance: 10,236; Referee: Sergey Kuznetsov

25 September 2013 10	Krylia Sovetov	1–4	Zenit St. Petersburg	Samara, Russia
19:15 MSK (UTC+4)	Goreux 23'	Summary	Hulk 47', 61'; Shatov 51', 79'	Stadium: Metallurg Stadium; Attendance: 15,670; Referee: Alexey Nikolaev

29 September 2013 11	Dynamo Moscow	2–0	Krylia Sovetov	Khimki
13:30 MSK (UTC+4)	Kokorin 13'; Zhirkov 79'	Summary		Stadium: Arena Khimki; Attendance: 3,250; Referee: Vitali Meshkov

5 October 2013 12	Krylya Sovetov	2–2	Lokomotiv Moscow	Samara
16:00 MSK (UTC+4)	Kornilenko 18', 39' (pen.)	Report	47' N'Doye; 64' (yellow card) 90+2' (yellow-red card) Mykhalyk	Stadium: Metallurg Stadium; Attendance: 10,456; Referee: Sergey Lapochkin

20 October 2013 13	Rostov	1–2	Krylia Sovetov	Rostov-on-Don
15:45 MSK (UTC+4)	Gațcan 23'	Summary	Caballero 78'; Yeliseyev 90+2'	Stadium: Olimp – 2 Attendance: 10,800; Referee: Sergey Karasev

25 October 2013 14	Krylia Sovetov	2–2	Volga Nizhny Novgorod	Samara
19:00 MSK (UTC+4)	Caballero 10'; Pavlenko 56'	Summary	Bibilov 29'; Danilenko 75'	Stadium: Metallurg Stadium; Attendance: 10,789; Referee: Maxim Layushkin

4 November 2013 15	Terek Grozny	0–1	Krylia Sovetov	Grozny
16:00 MSK (UTC+4)		Summary	Kornilenko 35'	Stadium: Terek Stadium; Attendance: 13,420; Referee: Aleksandr Egorov

9 November 2013 16	Krylia Sovetov	1–2	Dynamo Moscow	Samara
16:00 MSK (UTC+4)	Semshov 23'	Summary	Denisov 29'; Noboa 75'	Stadium: Metallurg Stadium; Attendance: 12,356; Referee: Vladislav Bezborodov

24 November 2013 17	Ural	1–1	Krylia Sovetov	Yekaterinburg
16:00 MSK (UTC+4)	Tumasyan 39'; Yerokhin (red card) 48'	Summary	Caballero 90'	Stadium: Central Stadium; Attendance: 5,100; Referee: Mikhail Vilkov

1 December 2013 18	Krylia Sovetov	1–0	Krasnodar	Samara
16:00 MSK (UTC+4)	Drahun 69'	Summary		Stadium: Metallurg Stadium; Attendance: 10,797; Referee: Vladimir Kazmenko

7 December 2013 19	Volga Nizhny Novgorod	1–2	Krylya Sovetov	Nizhny Novgorod
13:30 MSK (UTC+4)	Kowalczyk 13'	Summary	Caballero 32'; Delkin 89'	Stadium: Lokomotiv Stadium; Attendance: 3,500; Referee: Aleksey Eskov

10 March 2014 20	Lokomotiv Moscow	2–1	Krylya Sovetov	Moscow
16:30 MSK (UTC+3)	N'Doye 18'; Ozdoyev 77'	Report	87' Drahun	Stadium: Lokomotiv Stadium; Attendance: 12,130; Referee: Mikhail Vilkov

15 March 2014 21	Krylia Sovetov	0–2	Rostov	Samara
13:30 MSK (UTC+4)		Summary	Kanga 35'; Dyakov 70'	Stadium: Metallurg Stadium; Attendance: 11,570; Referee: Igor Fedotov

24 March 2014 22	Zenit St. Petersburg	2–1	Krylia Sovetov	Saint Petersburg
19:00 MSK (UTC+4)	Hulk 5' (pen.), 52'	Summary	Tsallagov 54'	Stadium: Petrovsky Stadium; Attendance: 18,758; Referee: Sergey Karasev

31 March 2014 23	Krylia Sovetov	Postponed	Terek Grozny	Samara
18:30 MSK (UTC+4)		Summary		Stadium: Metallurg Stadium; Referee: Timur Arslanbekov

5 April 2014 24	Krylia Sovetov	1–3	CSKA Moscow	Rostov-on-Don
16:30 MSK (UTC+4)	Chochiyev 88'	Summary	Tošić 4', 55'; Doumbia 7'	Stadium: Olimp – 2 Attendance: 4,700; Referee: Aleksandr Egorov

8 April 2014 23	Krylia Sovetov	1–1	Terek Grozny	Kazan
19:00 MSK (UTC+4)	Caballero 44'	Summary	Bokila 40'	Stadium: Central Stadium; Attendance: 443; Referee: Igor Fedotov

11 April 2014 25	Spartak Moscow	1–0	Krylia Sovetov	Moscow
19:30 MSK (UTC+4)	Movsisyan 15'	Summary		Stadium: Lokomotiv Stadium; Attendance: 9,710; Referee: Sergey Ivanov

19 April 2014 26	Tom Tomsk	2–0	Krylia Sovetov	Tomsk
16:00 OMST (UTC+7)	Sabitov 28'; Holenda 30'	Summary		Stadium: Trud Stadium; Attendance: 4,500; Referee: Sergey Karasev

25 April 2014 27	Krylia Sovetov	2–2	Amkar Perm	Samara
19:00 MSK (UTC+4)	Kornilenko 65'; Delkin 71'	Summary	Peev 20', 77' (pen.)	Stadium: Metallurg Stadium; Attendance: 9,000; Referee: Vladislav Bezborodov

3 May 2014 28	Kuban Krasnodar	4–0	Krylia Sovetov	Krasnodar
19:00 MSK (UTC+4)	Manolev 48'; Melgarejo 49', 60'; Rabiu 79'	Summary		Stadium: Kuban Stadium; Attendance: 7,548; Referee: Mikhail Vilkov

10 May 2014 29	Krylia Sovetov	0–4	Rubin Kazan	Metallurg Stadium
15:15 MSK (UTC+4)		Summary	Wakaso 23'; Mogilevets 63'; Azmoun 74'; Dević 90'	Stadium: Samara; Attendance: 11,900; Referee: Timur Arslanbekov

15 May 2014 30	Anzhi Makhachkala	0–1	Krylia Sovetov	Kaspiysk
18:30 MSK (UTC+4)	Serderov (red card) 90+3'	Summary	Delkin 58'	Stadium: Anzhi-Arena; Attendance: 5,031; Referee: Aleksey Eskov

==== League table ====
Pos	Team	Pld	W	D	L	GF	GA	GD	Pts	Qualification or relegation
12	Terek Grozny	30	8	9	13	27	33	−6	33	
13	Tom Tomsk (R)	30	8	7	15	23	39	−16	31	Qualification for the Relegation play-offs
14	Krylia Sovetov Samara (R)	30	6	11	13	27	46	−19	29	Qualification for the Relegation play-offs
15	Volga Nizhny Novgorod (R)	30	6	3	21	22	65	−43	21	Relegation to Football National League
16	Anzhi Makhachkala (R)	30	3	11	16	25	42	−17	20	Relegation to Football National League

Source: Russian Premier League
Rules for classification: 1) points; 2) number of wins; 3) head-to-head points; 4) number of head-to-head wins; 5) head-to-head goal difference; 6) number of head-to-head goals scored; 7) number of head-to-head away goals scored; 8) goal difference; 9) number of goals scored; 10) number of away goals scored; 11) position in the 2012–13 season (only used until all the regularly scheduled games have been played); 11) extra play-off game or tournament between the teams in question.
(R) Relegated

=== Relegation play-offs ===
18 May 2014 1st leg	Torpedo Moscow	2–0	Krylia Sovetov	Ramenskoye
19:00 MSK (UTC+4)	Salugin 40'; Vlasov 67'	Summary		Stadium: Saturn Stadium; Attendance: 6,500; Referee: Sergey Ivanov

22 May 2014 2nd leg	Krylia Sovetov	0–0 (0–2 agg.)	Torpedo Moscow	Samara
19:00 MSK (UTC+4)		Summary		Stadium: Metallurg Stadium; Attendance: 20,000; Referee: Aleksandr Yegorov

=== Russian Cup ===
31 October 2013 Fifth Round	Sokol Saratov	1–1 (a.e.t.) (3–1 p)	Krylia Sovetov	Saratov
17:30 MSK (UTC+4)	Gonezhukov 88'	Summary	Semshov 22'; Tsallagov (yellow card) 25' (yellow-red card) 78'	Stadium: Lokomotiv Stadium; Attendance: 12,920; Referee: Evgeny Turbin
	Penalties
	Dutov (penalty scored); Sapozhkov (penalty scored); Gorbatyuk (penalty scored); Stolyarenko (penalty missed)		Zeballos (penalty scored); Taranov (penalty missed); Goreux (penalty missed); Nadson (penalty missed)

== Squad statistics ==
=== Appearances and goals ===
No.	Pos	Nat	Player	Total		Premier League		Relegation Play-offs		Russian Cup	
No.	Pos	Nat	Player	Apps	Goals	Apps	Goals	Apps	Goals	Apps	Goals
1	GK	(Russia) RUS	Denis Vavilin	4	0	4	0	0	0	0	0
2	MF	(Belarus) BLR	Stanislaw Drahun	29	2	24+2	2	1+1	0	1	0
3	DF	(Brazil) BRA	Nadson	13	0	12	0	0	0	1	0
4	DF	(Russia) RUS	Ivan Taranov	19	0	15+1	0	2	0	1	0
5	DF	(Georgia (country)) GEO	Aleksandr Amisulashvili	30	1	28	1	2	0	0	0
6	DF	(Brazil) BRA	Bruno Teles	5	0	2+1	0	2	0	0	0
7	MF	(Russia) RUS	Petr Nemov	28	0	26	0	2	0	0	0
8	FW	(Belarus) BLR	Sergei Kornilenko	25	4	15+8	4	1+1	0	0	0
9	FW	(Paraguay) PAR	Luis Caballero	31	6	17+11	6	1+1	0	1	0
11	MF	(Russia) RUS	Aleksandr Pavlenko	11	1	5+5	1	0+1	0	0	0
14	MF	(Russia) RUS	Aleksandr Yeliseyev	9	1	0+8	1	0	0	1	0
15	DF	(Russia) RUS	Ibragim Tsallagov	30	4	27+1	4	1	0	1	0
17	MF	(Russia) RUS	Viktor Kuzmichyov	3	0	0+2	0	0	0	0+1	0
18	DF	(Belarus) BLR	Dmitry Verkhovtsov	12	0	8+3	0	0+1	0	0	0
20	MF	(Russia) RUS	Igor Semshov	15	2	10+4	2	0	0	1	0
21	MF	(Russia) RUS	Ruslan Adzhindzhal	30	0	28	0	2	0	0	0
22	DF	(Haiti) HAI	Réginal Goreux	29	1	23+4	1	0+1	0	1	0
23	MF	(Russia) RUS	Yevgeni Balyaikin	11	0	7+4	0	0	0	0	0
28	DF	(Germany) GER	Felicio Brown Forbes	16	0	14+1	0	0	0	1	0
33	DF	(Russia) RUS	Dmitri Yatchenko	11	0	8+1	0	2	0	0	0
63	FW	(Russia) RUS	Artyom Delkin	13	3	1+9	3	2	0	0+1	0
67	MF	(Russia) RUS	Emin Makhmudov	4	0	4	0	0	0	0	0
77	MF	(Russia) RUS	Alan Chochiyev	9	1	1+6	1	2	0	0	0
82	GK	(Belarus) BLR	Syarhey Vyeramko	18	0	17	0	0	0	1	0
84	MF	(Russia) RUS	Roman Vorobyov	9	0	5+3	0	0	0	0+1	0
89	MF	(Russia) RUS	Maksim Paliyenko	1	0	1	0	0	0	0	0
99	GK	(Slovakia) SVK	Ján Mucha	12	0	10	0	2	0	0	0
Players away from Krylia Sovetov on loan:
Players who appeared for Krylia Sovetov that left during the seasonno longer at the club:
3	DF	(Georgia (country)) GEO	Gia Grigalava	5	0	5	0	0	0	0	0
10	FW	(Paraguay) PAR	Pablo Zeballos	5	0	1+3	0	0	0	1	0
19	DF	(Cameroon) CMR	Benoît Angbwa	6	0	6	0	0	0	0	0
87	MF	(Russia) RUS	Ilya Maksimov	4	2	4	2	0	0	0	0

=== Top scorers ===
Place	Position	Nation	Number	Name	Russian Premier League	Relegation Play-offs	Russian Cup	Total
1	FW	(Paraguay)	9	Luis Caballero	6	0	0	6
2	MF	(Russia)	8	Sergei Kornilenko	4	0	0	4
2	DF	(Russia)	15	Ibragim Tsallagov	4	0	0	4
4	FW	(Russia)	63	Artyom Delkin	3	0	0	3
5	MF	(Belarus)	2	Stanislaw Drahun	2	0	0	2
5	MF	(Russia)	87	Ilya Maksimov	2	0	0	2
5	MF	(Russia)	20	Igor Semshov	1	0	1	2
8	DF	(Georgia (country))	5	Aleksandr Amisulashvili	1	0	0	1
8	DF	(Haiti)	22	Réginal Goreux	1	0	0	1
8	MF	(Russia)	14	Aleksandr Yeliseyev	1	0	0	1
8	MF	(Russia)	11	Aleksandr Pavlenko	1	0	0	1
8	MF	(Russia)	77	Alan Chochiyev	1	0	0	1
				TOTALS	27	0	1	28

=== Disciplinary record ===
Number	Nation	Position	Name	Russian Premier League		Relegation Play-offs		Russian Cup		Total	
Number	Nation	Position	Name	Yellow card	Red card	Yellow card	Red card	Yellow card	Red card	Yellow card	Red card
2	(Belarus)	MF	Stanislaw Drahun	5	0	0	0	1	0	6	0
3	(Brazil)	DF	Nadson	1	0	0	0	0	0	1	0
4	(Russia)	DF	Ivan Taranov	3	0	1	0	0	0	4	0
6	(Brazil)	DF	Bruno Teles	0	0	1	0	0	0	1	0
7	(Russia)	MF	Pyotr Nemov	5	0	0	0	0	0	5	0
8	(Belarus)	FW	Sergei Kornilenko	2	0	0	0	0	0	2	0
9	(Paraguay)	FW	Luis Caballero	3	0	0	0	0	0	3	0
15	(Russia)	DF	Ibragim Tsallagov	4	0	0	0	2	1	6	1
18	(Belarus)	DF	Dmitry Verkhovtsov	1	0	0	0	0	0	1	0
19	(Cameroon)	DF	Benoît Angbwa	2	0	0	0	0	0	2	0
20	(Russia)	MF	Igor Semshov	1	0	0	0	0	0	1	0
21	(Russia)	MF	Ruslan Adzhindzhal	4	0	0	0	0	0	4	0
22	(Haiti)	DF	Réginal Goreux	7	0	0	0	1	0	8	0
23	(Russia)	MF	Yevgeni Balyaikin	4	0	0	0	0	0	4	0
28	(Germany)	DF	Felicio Brown Forbes	3	0	0	0	1	0	4	0
33	(Russia)	DF	Dmitri Yatchenko	1	0	1	0	0	0	2	0
63	(Russia)	FW	Artyom Delkin	1	0	1	0	0	0	2	0
67	(Russia)	MF	Emin Makhmudov	1	0	0	0	0	0	1	0
82	(Belarus)	GK	Syarhey Vyeramko	2	0	0	0	0	0	2	0
87	(Russia)	MF	Ilya Maksimov	1	1	0	0	0	0	1	1
99	(Slovakia)	GK	Ján Mucha	1	0	0	0	0	0	1	0
			TOTALS	52	1	4	0	5	1	61	2

== Notes ==
1. The Krylia Sovetov v Terek Grozny match was originally scheduled to be played on 31 March 2014 at 18:30 MSK, but was postponed till 1 April 2014 due to heavy snowfall. On 1 April, the game was again postponed due to the condition of the pitch, with a new re-arranged date and location of 8 April at Rubin Kazan's home ground of Central Stadium.
