= 2012–13 FC Krylia Sovetov Samara season =

Krylia Sovetov Samara
2012–13 season
- Chairman: Viktor Razveyev
- Manager: Andrey Kobelev until 15 November 2012; Aleksandr Tsygankov (caretaker); 15 November 2012 - 27 January 2013; Gadzhi Gadzhiev from 27 January 2013
- Stadium: Metallurg Stadion Samara
- Russian Premier League: 14th
- Russian Cup: Round of 16 vs Anzhi Makhachkala
- Top goalscorer: League: Luis Caballero (8); All: Luis Caballero (10)
Home colours	Away colours

The 2012–13 Krylia Sovetov Samara season was the 19th straight season that the club played in the Russian Premier League, the highest tier of football in Russia. They also played in the 2012–13 Russian Cup, getting eliminated by Anzhi Makhachkala in the Round of 16.

Krylia Sovetov started the season under the management of Andrey Kobelev. He resigned on 15 November 2012, resulting in Aleksandr Tsygankov taking charge in a caretaker capacity until 27 January 2013 when they appointed Gadzhi Gadzhiev as their permanent manager.

== Squad ==
Note: Flags indicate national team as defined under FIFA eligibility rules; some limited exceptions apply. Players may hold more than one non-FIFA nationality.

No.	Pos.	Nation	Player
1	GK	RUS	Denis Vavilin
2	MF	BLR	Stanislaw Drahun
4	DF	RUS	Ivan Taranov
5	DF	GEO	Aleksandr Amisulashvili
7	MF	RUS	Petr Nemov
8	FW	BLR	Sergei Kornilenko
9	FW	PAR	Luis Caballero
11	MF	RUS	Roman Grigoryan
13	FW	RUS	Shamil Lakhiyalov
14	FW	RUS	Igor Portnyagin (on loan from Rubin Kazan)
15	DF	RUS	Ibragim Tsallagov
16	DF	BRA	Bruno Teles
18	DF	BLR	Dmitry Verkhovtsov
19	DF	CMR	Benoît Angbwa
21	DF	RUS	Dmitri Golubev

No.	Pos.	Nation	Player
22	DF	HAI	Réginal Goreux
23	MF	RUS	Yevgeni Balyaikin
32	MF	RUS	Aleksandr Yeliseyev
44	MF	RUS	Konstantin Kertanov
45	DF	RUS	Aleksei Kontsedalov
50	MF	RUS	Viktor Kuzmichyov
51	MF	RUS	Viktor Svezhov
63	FW	RUS	Artyom Delkin
67	MF	RUS	Emin Mahmudov (on loan from Spartak Moscow)
78	GK	RUS	Aleksandr Makarov
82	GK	BLR	Syarhey Vyeramko (captain)
83	DF	FRA	Steeve Joseph-Reinette
84	MF	RUS	Roman Vorobyov
87	MF	RUS	Ilya Maksimov

=== On Loan ===
Note: Flags indicate national team as defined under FIFA eligibility rules; some limited exceptions apply. Players may hold more than one non-FIFA nationality.

No. / Pos. / Nation / Player; 10 / FW / PAR / Pablo Zeballos (loan to Emelec)	No. / Pos. / Nation / Player; 95 / GK / ALG / Raïs M'Bolhi (loan to Gazélec Ajaccio)

=== Reserve squad ===
Note: Flags indicate national team as defined under FIFA eligibility rules; some limited exceptions apply. Players may hold more than one non-FIFA nationality.

No.	Pos.	Nation	Player
27	FW	RUS	Sergei Sipatov
31	GK	RUS	Aleksei Fyodorov
34	MF	RUS	Pavel Seminyaka
36	DF	RUS	Denus Dyuzhkov
37	DF	RUS	Ramil Kafitulin
38	DF	RUS	Stanislav Bravin
39	DF	RUS	Vladislav Bykov
40	DF	RUS	Sergei Bozhin
41	FW	RUS	Vladimir Pestryachyov
43	MF	RUS	Oleg Roganov
46	DF	RUS	Tagir Aitov
52	FW	RUS	Aleksandr Klyagin
57	DF	RUS	Andrei Veselov
58	DF	RUS	Ayzer Abbasov

No.	Pos.	Nation	Player
59	MF	RUS	Dmitri Salov
65	FW	COL	Michael Barros
70	MF	RUS	Artyom Zubkov
71	GK	RUS	Aleksei Kozlov
73	MF	RUS	Aleksandr Mavrin
74	MF	RUS	Sergei Nakhlyostkin
79	FW	RUS	Artyom Lobov
80	FW	RUS	Magomed Ubaydulayev
87	DF	RUS	Aleksei Bykovtsov
89	MF	RUS	Maksim Paliyenko
93	MF	RUS	Artyom Bykov
94	GK	RUS	Andrei Larionov
97	MF	RUS	Fyodor Aleksenko

== Transfers ==
=== Summer ===
In: Note: Flags indicate national team as defined under FIFA eligibility rules; some limited exceptions apply. Players may hold more than one non-FIFA nationality.

No.	Pos.	Nation	Player
6	DF	MDA	Alexandru Epureanu (on loan from (Russia) Dynamo Moscow)
7	MF	RUS	Pyotr Nemov (from (Russia) Rubin Kazan)
9	FW	PAR	Luis Nery Caballero (from (Paraguay) Olimpia)
10	FW	PAR	Pablo Zeballos (from (Paraguay) Olimpia)
16	DF	BRA	Bruno Martins Teles (from (Portugal) Vitória)
23	MF	RUS	Yevgeni Balyaikin (from (Russia) Rubin Kazan)
32	MF	RUS	Aleksandr Yeliseyev (end of loan to (Russia) Shinnik Yaroslavl)
58	DF	RUS	Ayzer Abbasov (from (Russia) Zenit Saint Petersburg)
63	FW	RUS	Artyom Delkin (from (Russia) Torpedo Vladimir)
79	FW	RUS	Artyom Lobov (from (Russia) Akademiya Tolyatti)
80	FW	RUS	Magomed Ubaydulayev

Out: Note: Flags indicate national team as defined under FIFA eligibility rules; some limited exceptions apply. Players may hold more than one non-FIFA nationality.

No.	Pos.	Nation	Player
3	DF	BLR	Dmitry Molosh (to (Belarus) Dinamo Minsk)
7	MF	RUS	Anton Bobyor (to (Russia) Mordovia Saransk)
13	MF	BLR	Alexander Hleb (to (Belarus) BATE Borisov)
17	FW	UKR	Volodymyr Priyomov (to (Ukraine) Kryvbas Kryvyi Rih)
20	MF	CAN	Joseph Di Chiara (to (Hungary) Kecskeméti TE)
90	FW	RUS	Khyzyr Appayev (to (Russia) Krasnodar)
91	MF	RUS	Pavel Yakovlev (end of loan from (Russia) Spartak Moscow)
99	FW	COD	Joël Tshibamba (end of loan from (Greece) AEL)
—	MF	RUS	Basel Abdoulfattakh (to (Russia) Yenisey Krasnoyarsk, previously on loan)

=== Winter ===
In: Note: Flags indicate national team as defined under FIFA eligibility rules; some limited exceptions apply. Players may hold more than one non-FIFA nationality.

No.	Pos.	Nation	Player
2	MF	BLR	Stanislaw Drahun (from (Belarus) Dinamo Minsk)
5	DF	GEO	Aleksandr Amisulashvili (from (Russia) FC Krasnodar)
13	FW	RUS	Shamil Lakhiyalov (from (Russia) Anzhi Makhachkala)
14	FW	RUS	Igor Portnyagin (on loan from (Russia) Rubin Kazan)
19	DF	CMR	Benoît Angbwa (from (Russia) Rostov)
22	DF	HAI	Réginal Goreux (from (Belgium) Standard Liège)
50	MF	RUS	Viktor Kuzmichyov (from (Russia) Rubin Kazan)
67	MF	RUS	Emin Makhmudov (on loan from (Russia) Spartak Moscow)
78	GK	RUS	Aleksandr Makarov (from (Russia) Sibir Novosibirsk)
87	MF	RUS	Ilya Maksimov (from (Russia) Volga Nizhny Novgorod)

Out: Note: Flags indicate national team as defined under FIFA eligibility rules; some limited exceptions apply. Players may hold more than one non-FIFA nationality.

No.	Pos.	Nation	Player
6	DF	MDA	Alexandru Epureanu (end of loan from (Russia) Dynamo Moscow)
10	FW	PAR	Pablo Zeballos (on loan to (Ecuador) Emelec)
92	GK	ALG	Raïs M'Bolhi (on loan to (France) Gazélec Ajaccio)
98	MF	RUS	Sergei Petrov (to (Russia) FC Krasnodar)

== Competitions ==
=== Russian Premier League ===
==== Results ====
22 July 2012 1	Krylia Sovetov Samara	1 – 1	Terek Grozny	Samara
17:30 MSK (UTC+4)	Caballero 82' (pen.)	Summary	Ivanov 56'	Stadium: Metallurg Stadion; Attendance: 9,500; Referee: Sergey Karasev

28 July 2012 2	Lokomotiv Moscow	2 – 0	Krylia Sovetov Samara	Moscow
19:00 MSK (UTC+4)	Pavlyuchenko 32'; Caicedo 67'	Summary		Stadium: Lokomotiv Stadium; Attendance: 13,442; Referee: Sergey Lapochkin

5 August 2012 3	Krylia Sovetov Samara	2 – 1	Kuban Krasnodar	Samara
17:00 MSK (UTC+4)	Karnilenka 30'; Joseph-Reinette 86'	Summary	Tsorayev 39'; Tlisov (red card) 41'	Stadium: Metallurg Stadion; Attendance: 11,000; Referee: Vladimir Kazmenko

12 August 2012 4	Rostov	1 – 2	Krylia Sovetov Samara	Rostov
21:00 MSK (UTC+4)	Saláta 54'	Summary	Caballero 19'; Verkhovtsov 60'	Stadium: Olimp - 2 Attendance: 6,800; Referee: Vitali Meshkov

20 August 2012 5	Krylia Sovetov Samara	0 – 2	Amkar Perm	Samara
18:00 MSK (UTC+4)	Caballero (red card) 39'	Summary	Burmistrov 2'; Vassiljev 45+1'	Stadium: Metallurg Stadion; Attendance: 11,400; Referee: Sergei Ivanov

26 August 2012 6	CSKA Moscow	3 – 0	FC Krylia Sovetov Samara	Moscow
16:30 MSK (UTC+4)	Cauņa 6'; Tošić 41'; Musa 86'	Summary		Stadium: Arena Khimki; Attendance: 11,000; Referee: Eduard Malyi

1 September 2012 7	Krylia Sovetov Samara	1 – 2	Anzhi Makhachkala	Samara
18:15 MSK (UTC+4)	Zeballos 83'	Summary	Samba 26'; Traoré 56'	Stadium: Metallurg Stadium; Attendance: 12,500; Referee: Aleksandr Egorov

17 September 2012 8	Mordovia Saransk	2 – 3	Krylia Sovetov Samara	Saransk
19:30 MSK (UTC+4)	Osipov 31'; Bober 60'	Summary	Epureanu 27'; Nemov 83'; Grigoryan 90+1'	Stadium: Start Stadium; Attendance: 7,000; Referee: Aleksey Eskov

22 September 2012 9	Krylia Sovetov Samara	2 – 2	Zenit St. Petersburg	Samara
18:00 MSK (UTC+4)	Karnilenka 10'; Caballero 26'; Epureanu (yellow card) 45+2' (yellow-red card) 75'	Summary	Hulk 65'; Shirokov 78'	Stadium: Metallurg Stadium; Attendance: 16,570; Referee: Sergey Karasev

1 October 2012 10	Krylia Sovetov Samara	2 – 2	Krasnodar	Samara
17:30 MSK (UTC+4)	Caballero 32', 35'	Summary	Movsisyan 25'; Wánderson 54'	Stadium: Metallurg Stadion; Attendance: 10,458; Referee: Vasiliy Kazartsev

6 October 2012 11	Alania Vladikavkaz	2 – 2	Krylia Sovetov Samara	Vladikavkaz
19:00 MSK (UTC+4)	Neco 34', 69'	Summary	Grigoryan 63'; Teles 73'	Stadium: Republican Spartak Stadium; Attendance: 12,500; Referee: Sergey Lapochkin

22 October 2012 12	Krylia Sovetov Samara	0 – 1	Volga Nizhny Novgorod	Samara
19:00 MSK (UTC+4)		Summary	Belozyorov 68'	Stadium: Metallurg Stadion; Attendance: 7,534; Referee: Timur Arslanbekov

27 October 2012 13	Dynamo Moscow	1 – 0	Krylia Sovetov	Moscow
13:30 MSK (UTC+4)	Kokorin 13'	Summary		Stadium: Arena Khimki; Attendance: 3,107; Referee: Aleksei Nikolaev

3 November 2012 14	Krylia Sovetov Samara	0 – 5	Spartak Moscow	Samara
15:30 MSK (UTC+4)		Summary	Jurado 12'; Pareja 38'; Kombarov 69'; Dzyuba 76'; Ananidze 83'	Stadium: Metallurg Stadium; Attendance: 10,140; Referee: Vladislav Bezborodov

11 November 2012 15	Rubin Kazan	2 – 0	Krylia Sovetov Samara	Kazan
15:45 MSK (UTC+4)	Sharonov 6'; Natcho 84' (pen.); Kuzmin (yellow card) 89' (yellow-red card) 90+4'	Summary		Stadium: Tsentralnyi Stadion; Attendance: 6,392; Referee: Aleksey Eskov

19 November 2012 16	Krylia Sovetov Samara	0 – 1	Lokomotiv Moscow	Samara
17:45 MSK (UTC+4)		Summary	N'Doye 4'	Stadium: Metallurg Stadium; Attendance: 10,123; Referee: Sergei Ivanov

25 November 2012 17	Kuban Krasnodar	4 – 1	Krylia Sovetov Samara	Krasnodar
16:00 MSK (UTC+4)	Baldé 18'; Popov 19', 79'; Pizzelli 71' (pen.)	Summary	Özbiliz 64' (o.g.)	Stadium: Kuban Stadium; Attendance: 14,560; Referee: Igor Nizovtsev

1 December 2012 18	Krylia Sovetov Samara	0 – 2	Rostov	Samara
16:00 MSK (UTC+4)	Tsallagov (red card) 63'	Summary	Blatnjak 6'; Česnauskis 74'	Stadium: Metallurg Stadium; Attendance: 7,600; Referee: Mikhail Vilkov

8 December 2012 19	Amkar Perm	0 – 2	FC Krylia Sovetov Samara	Samara
12:00 MSK (UTC+4)	Semyonov (yellow card) 26' (yellow-red card) 40'	Summary	Cherenchikov 5' (o.g.); Yeliseyev 38'	Stadium: Metallurg Stadion; Attendance: 5,500; Referee: Sergey Kostevich

9 March 2013 20	Krylia Sovetov Samara	0 – 2	CSKA Moscow	Samara
16:00 MSK (UTC+4)		Summary	Wernbloom 38'; Musa 72'	Stadium: Metallurg Stadium; Attendance: 22,000; Referee: Vladimir Kazmenko

17 March 2013 21	Anzhi Makhachkala	1 – 1	Krylia Sovetov Samara	Makhachkala
15:45 MSK (UTC+4)	Traore 81'	Summary	Amisulashvili (yellow card) 18' (yellow-red card) 37'; Kornilenko 63'	Stadium: Dynamo Stadium; Attendance: 26,200; Referee: Vitali Meshkov

30 March 2013 22	Krylia Sovetov Samara	0 – 2	Mordovia Saransk	Samara
16:00 MSK (UTC+4)		Summary	Oprița 28'; Ruslan Mukhametshin 44'; Stepanets (yellow card) 60' (yellow-red card) 75'	Stadium: Metallurg Stadion; Attendance: 16,784; Referee: Mikhail Vilkov

7 April 2013 23	Zenit St. Petersburg	1 – 0	Krylia Sovetov Samara	Saint Petersburg
14:30 MSK (UTC+4)	Hulk 14' (pen.); Danny (yellow card) 45+1'; Rodić (yellow card) 57'; Witsel (yellow card) 90'	Summary	Angbwa (yellow card) 20'; Vyeramko (yellow card) 38'	Stadium: Petrovsky Stadium; Attendance: 19,741; Referee: Maxim Layushkin

13 April 2013 24	Krasnodar	0 – 3	Krylia Sovetov Samara	Krasnodar
18:30 MSK (UTC+4)		Summary	Goreux 2'; Maksimov 90', 90+3'	Stadium: Kuban Stadium; Attendance: 7,500; Referee: Sergey Lapochkin

20 April 2013 25	Krylia Sovetov Samara	2 – 1	Alania Vladikavkaz	Samara
16:00 MSK (UTC+4)	Goreux 11'; Angbwa 44'	Summary	Priskin 88'	Stadium: Metallurg Stadium; Attendance: 16,987; Referee: Vladimir Kazmenko

26 April 2012 26	Volga Nizhny Novgorod	1 – 1	Krylia Sovetov Samara	Nizhny Novgorod
19:00 MSK (UTC+4)	Karyaka 38' (pen.)	Summary	Caballero 82' (pen.)	Stadium: Lokomotiv Stadium; Attendance: 7,700; Referee: Timur Arslanbekov

5 May 2013 27	Krylia Sovetov Samara	1 – 2	Dynamo Moscow	Samara
13:30 MSK (UTC+4)	Taranov 65'	Summary	Dzsudzsák 5'; Solomatin 61'	Stadium: Metallurg Stadium; Attendance: 16,547; Referee: Vitali Meshkov

11 May 2013 28	Spartak Moscow	1 – 1	Krylia Sovetov Samara	Moscow
MSK (UTC+4)	Suchý 31'	Summary	Nemov 8'	Stadium: Luzhniki Stadium; Attendance: 16,567; Referee: Aleksandr Egorov

19 May 2013 29	Krylia Sovetov Samara	3 – 1	Rubin Kazan	Samara
16:00 MSK (UTC+4)	Caballero 11'; Maksimov 50', 90+2'	Summary	Dyadyun 72'	Stadium: Metallurg Stadium; Attendance: 26,345; Referee: Sergey Lapochkin

26 May 2013 30	Terek Grozny	4 – 1	Krylia Sovetov Samara	Grozny
13:30 MSK (UTC+4)	N'Douassel 41', 66'; Antonio Ferreira 70'; Kanu 77'	Summary	Caballero 49'	Stadium: Sultan Bilimkhanov Stadium; Attendance: 13,700; Referee: Aleksey Eskov

==== Table ====
Pos	Team	Pld	W	D	L	GF	GA	GD	Pts	Qualification or relegation
12	Volga Nizhny Novgorod	30	7	8	15	28	46	−18	29 (Note: Amkar Perm ahead of Volga Nizhny Novgorod and Rostov on head-to-head points; Amkar Perm: 7 pts, Volga Nizhny Novgorod: 5 pts, Rostov: 4 pts.)	
13	Rostov (O)	30	7	8	15	30	41	−11	29	Qualification for the Relegation play-offs
14	Krylia Sovetov Samara (O)	30	7	7	16	31	52	−21	28	Qualification for the Relegation play-offs
15	Mordovia Saransk (R)	30	5	5	20	30	57	−27	20	Relegation to Football National League
16	Alania Vladikavkaz (R)	30	4	7	19	26	53	−27	19	Relegation to Football National League

Source: Russian Premier League
Rules for classification: 1) points; 2) number of wins; 3) head-to-head points; 4) number of head-to-head wins; 5) head-to-head goal difference; 6) number of head-to-head goals scored; 7) number of head-to-head away goals scored; 8) goal difference; 9) number of goals scored; 10) number of away goals scored; 11) position in the 2011–12 season (only used until all the regularly scheduled games have been played); 11) extra play-off game or tournament between the teams in question.
(O) Play-off winners; (R) Relegated

=== Relegation play-offs ===
30 May 2013 1st Leg	Krylia Sovetov Samara	2 – 0	Spartak Nalchik	Samara
18:30 MSK (UTC+4)	Caballero 21' (pen.), 42' (pen.)	Summary		Stadium: Metallurg Stadium; Attendance: 27,654; Referee: Vladislav Bezborodov

3 June 2013 2nd Leg	Spartak Nalchik	2 – 5 (2 – 7 agg.)	Rostov	Nalchik
19:00 MSK (UTC+4)	Siradze 86', 90'	Summary	Angbwa 33', 71'; Portnyagin 55', 90'; Makhmudov 78'	Stadium: Spartak Stadium; Attendance: 11,000; Referee: Alexey Nikolaev

=== Russian Cup ===
27 September 2012 Round of 32	Gazovik Orenburg	2 – 4 (a.e.t.)	Krylia Sovetov Samara	Orenburg
16:00 MSK (UTC+4)	Serdyukov 1'; Budylin 49' (pen.)	Summary	Vorobyov 61'; Epureanu 71'; Delkin 113'; Svezhov 120+'	Stadium: Gazovik Stadium; Attendance: 4,800; Referee: Vasili Miroshnichenko

31 October 2012 Round of 16	Anzhi Makhachkala	2 – 1	Krylia Sovetov Samara	Makhachkala
16:00 MSK (UTC+4)	Burmistrov 21'; Tagirbekov (red card) 63'; Serderov 87'	Summary	Petrov 8'	Stadium: Dynamo Stadium; Attendance: 12,500; Referee: Vladimir Kazmenko

== Squad statistics ==
=== Appearances and goals ===
No.	Pos	Nat	Player	Total		Premier League		Relegation Play-off		Russian Cup	
No.	Pos	Nat	Player	Apps	Goals	Apps	Goals	Apps	Goals	Apps	Goals
1	GK	(Russia) RUS	Denis Vavilin	3	0	1+0	0	0+0	0	2+0	0
2	MF	(Belarus) BLR	Stanislaw Drahun	9	0	8+0	0	1+0	0	0+0	0
4	DF	(Russia) RUS	Ivan Taranov	21	1	18+0	1	2+0	0	1+0	0
5	DF	(Georgia (country)) GEO	Aleksandr Amisulashvili	12	0	10+0	0	2+0	0	0+0	0
6	DF	(Moldova) MDA	Alexandru Epureanu	19	2	17+0	1	0+0	0	2+0	1
7	MF	(Russia) RUS	Petr Nemov	22	2	20+0	2	2+0	0	0+0	0
8	FW	(Belarus) BLR	Sergei Kornilenko	24	3	19+3	3	0+0	0	1+1	0
9	FW	(Paraguay) PAR	Luis Caballero	29	10	21+6	8	1+0	2	1+0	0
11	MF	(Russia) RUS	Roman Grigoryan	12	2	4+6	2	0+0	0	2+0	0
13	FW	(Russia) RUS	Shamil Lakhiyalov	4	0	4+0	0	0+0	0	0+0	0
14	FW	(Russia) RUS	Igor Portnyagin	7	2	5+0	0	2+0	2	0+0	0
15	DF	(Russia) RUS	Ibragim Tsallagov	18	0	12+4	0	1+0	0	1+0	0
16	DF	(Brazil) BRA	Bruno Teles	25	1	22+0	1	2+0	0	1+0	0
18	DF	(Belarus) BLR	Dmitry Verkhovtsov	15	1	11+3	1	0+0	0	1+0	0
19	DF	(Cameroon) CMR	Benoît Angbwa	13	3	11+0	1	2+0	2	0+0	0
21	DF	(Russia) RUS	Dmitri Golubev	7	0	3+3	0	0+0	0	1+0	0
22	DF	(Haiti) HAI	Réginal Goreux	13	2	11+0	2	2+0	0	0+0	0
23	MF	(Russia) RUS	Yevgeni Balyaikin	23	0	18+1	0	2+0	0	1+1	0
32	MF	(Russia) RUS	Aleksandr Yeliseyev	12	1	1+10	1	0+0	0	1+0	0
40	DF	(Russia) RUS	Sergei Bozhin	1	0	0+0	0	0+1	0	0+0	0
44	MF	(Russia) RUS	Konstantin Kertanov	1	0	0+1	0	0+0	0	0+0	0
45	DF	(Russia) RUS	Aleksei Kontsedalov	15	0	12+1	0	0+0	0	2+0	0
50	MF	(Russia) RUS	Viktor Kuzmichyov	1	0	0+0	0	0+1	0	0+0	0
51	MF	(Russia) RUS	Viktor Svezhov	15	1	8+6	0	0+0	0	1+0	1
63	FW	(Russia) RUS	Artyom Delkin	15	1	5+8	0	0+1	0	1+0	1
67	MF	(Russia) RUS	Emin Mahmudov	2	1	0+0	0	0+2	1	0+0	0
82	GK	(Belarus) BLR	Syarhey Vyeramko	31	0	29+0	0	2+0	0	0+0	0
83	DF	(France) FRA	Steeve Joseph-Reinette	15	1	15+0	1	0+0	0	0+0	0
84	MF	(Russia) RUS	Roman Vorobyov	28	1	16+10	0	0+1	0	1+0	1
87	MF	(Russia) RUS	Ilya Maksimov	10	4	8+1	4	1+0	0	0+0	0
Players who left Krylia Sovetov Samara on loan during the season:
10	FW	(Paraguay) PAR	Pablo Zeballos	16	1	13+2	1	0+0	0	1+0	0
Players who left Krylia Sovetov Samara during the season:
98	MF	(Russia) RUS	Sergei Petrov	14	1	13+0	0	0+0	0	1+0	1

=== Top scorers ===
Place	Position	Nation	Number	Name	Premier League	Relegation Play-off	Russian Cup	Total
1	FW	(Paraguay)	9	Luis Caballero	8	2	0	10
2	MF	(Russia)	87	Ilya Maksimov	4	0	0	4
3	FW	(Belarus)	8	Syarhey Karnilenka	3	0	0	3
3	DF	(Cameroon)	19	Benoît Angbwa	1	2	0	3
5	MF	(Russia)	11	Roman Grigoryan	2	0	0	2
5	MF	(Russia)	7	Petr Nemov	2	0	0	2
5	DF	(Haiti)	22	Réginal Goreux	2	0	0	2
5				Own goal	2	0	0	2
5	DF	(Moldova)	6	Alexandru Epureanu	1	0	1	2
5	FW	(Russia)	14	Igor Portnyagin	0	2	0	2
11	DF	(France)	83	Steeve Joseph-Reinette	1	0	0	1
11	DF	(Belarus)	18	Dmitry Verkhovtsov	1	0	0	1
11	FW	(Paraguay)	10	Pablo Zeballos	1	0	0	1
11	DF	(Brazil)	16	Bruno Teles	1	0	0	1
11	MF	(Russia)	32	Aleksandr Yeliseyev	1	0	0	1
11	DF	(Russia)	4	Ivan Taranov	1	0	0	1
11	MF	(Russia)	67	Emin Makhmudov	0	1	0	1
11	MF	(Russia)	84	Roman Vorobyov	0	0	1	1
11	FW	(Russia)	63	Artyom Delkin	0	0	1	1
11	MF	(Russia)	51	Viktor Svezhov	0	0	1	1
11	MF	(Russia)	98	Sergei Petrov	0	0	1	1
				TOTALS	31	7	5	43

=== Disciplinary record ===
Number	Nation	Position	Name	Premier League		Relegation Play-off		Russian Cup		Total	
Number	Nation	Position	Name	Yellow card	Red card	Yellow card	Red card	Yellow card	Red card	Yellow card	Red card
2	(Belarus)	DF	Stanislaw Drahun	4	0	0	0	0	0	4	0
4	(Russia)	DF	Ivan Taranov	2	0	1	0	0	0	3	0
5	(Georgia (country))	DF	Aleksandr Amisulashvili	4	1	1	0	0	0	5	1
6	(Moldova)	DF	Alexandru Epureanu	5	1	0	0	0	0	5	1
7	(Russia)	MF	Petr Nemov	1	0	0	0	0	0	1	0
8	(Belarus)	FW	Sergei Kornilenko	5	0	0	0	0	0	5	0
9	(Paraguay)	FW	Luis Caballero	5	1	0	0	0	0	5	1
10	(Paraguay)	FW	Pablo Zeballos	3	0	0	0	1	0	4	0
15	(Russia)	DF	Ibragim Tsallagov	5	1	0	0	1	0	6	1
16	(Brazil)	DF	Bruno Teles	4	0	0	0	1	0	5	0
18	(Belarus)	DF	Dmitry Verkhovtsov	4	0	0	0	1	0	5	0
19	(Cameroon)	DF	Benoît Angbwa	2	0	0	0	0	0	2	0
21	(Russia)	DF	Dmitri Golubev	1	0	0	0	0	0	1	0
22	(Haiti)	DF	Réginal Goreux	2	0	1	0	0	0	3	0
23	(Russia)	MF	Yevgeni Balyaikin	7	0	1	0	0	0	8	0
32	(Russia)	MF	Aleksandr Yeliseyev	2	0	0	0	0	0	2	0
45	(Russia)	DF	Aleksei Kontsedalov	4	0	0	0	0	0	4	0
51	(Russia)	MF	Viktor Svezhov	4	0	0	0	1	0	5	0
63	(Russia)	FW	Artyom Delkin	2	0	0	0	0	0	2	0
82	(Belarus)	GK	Syarhey Vyeramko	6	0	0	0	0	0	6	0
83	(Russia)	DF	Steeve Joseph-Reinette	2	0	0	0	0	0	2	0
84	(Russia)	DF	Aleksei Kontsedalov	1	0	0	0	0	0	1	0
87	(Russia)	MF	Ilya Maksimov	2	0	0	0	0	0	2	0
98	(Russia)	MF	Sergei Petrov	2	0	0	0	0	0	2	0
			TOTALS	79	4	4	0	5	0	88	4
