= Vladimir Drukovsky =

Russian professional footballer

Personal information
- Full name: Vladimir Petrovich Drukovsky
- Date of birth: 2 July 1989 (age 37)
- Place of birth: Omsk, Russian SFSR
- Height: 1.80 m (5 ft 11 in)
- Position: Defender

Youth career
- –2003: Molniya Omsk
- 2004–2006: Konoplyov football academy

Senior career*
Years	Team	Apps	(Gls)
2006–2007	FC Krylia Sovetov-SOK Dimitrovgrad	47	(0)
2008	FC Togliatti	29	(0)
2009–2010	FC Krylia Sovetov Samara	0	(0)
2010	→ FC Irtysh Omsk (loan)	28	(1)
2011–2012	FC SKA-Energiya Khabarovsk	12	(0)
2012	FC Akademiya Tolyatti	16	(0)
2013–2015	FC Syzran-2003	50	(3)
2015–2016	FC Irtysh Omsk	23	(2)
2016–2017	FC Sakhalin Yuzhno-Sakhalinsk	17	(1)
2017–2018	FC Murom	26	(3)
2018–2019	FC Lada-Togliatti	22	(0)
2019–2020	FC Akron Tolyatti	27	(2)

International career
2008	Russia U19	6	(0)
2009	Russia U20	8	(0)
- * Club domestic league appearances and goals

Vladimir Petrovich Drukovsky (Russian: Владимир Петрович Друковский; born 2 July 1989) is a Russian former professional footballer.

== Club career ==
He made his professional debut in the Russian Second Division in 2006 for FC Krylia Sovetov-SOK Dimitrovgrad.

He made his Russian Football National League debut for FC Irtysh Omsk on 10 April 2010 in a game against FC Volgar-Gazprom Astrakhan.
