= Aleksandr Stolyarenko =

Russian footballer

Personal information
- Full name: Aleksandr Aleksandrovich Stolyarenko
- Date of birth: 18 January 1991 (age 35)
- Place of birth: Zdvinsk, USSR
- Height: 1.85 m (6 ft 1 in)
- Positions: Defender; midfielder

Youth career
- –2003: Molniya Omsk
- 2004–2007: Konoplyov football academy

Senior career*
Years	Team	Apps	(Gls)
2007	FC Krylia Sovetov-SOK Dimitrovgrad	2	(0)
2008	FC Togliatti	27	(1)
2009–2014	PFC CSKA Moscow	0	(0)
2011	→ FC Akademiya Togliatti (loan)	23	(3)
2012	→ FC Torpedo Moscow (loan)	12	(1)
2012–2014	→ FC Sokol Saratov (loan)	46	(2)
2014–2016	FC Sokol Saratov	62	(3)
2016–2018	FC Arsenal Tula	0	(0)
2016–2017	→ FC Tambov (loan)	17	(1)
2017–2018	→ FC Rotor Volgograd (loan)	23	(0)
2018	FC Tyumen	23	(1)
2019	FC Chayka Peschanokopskoye	8	(0)
2019–2023	FC Sokol Saratov	89	(8)

International career
2007	Russia U-16	8	(3)
2008	Russia U-17	11	(5)
2010	Russia U-19	7	(2)
- * Club domestic league appearances and goals

Aleksandr Aleksandrovich Stolyarenko (Russian: Александр Александрович Столяренко; born 18 January 1991) is a Russian former professional footballer.

== Career ==
He made his professional debut in the Russian Second Division in 2007 for FC Krylia Sovetov-SOK Dimitrovgrad.

He made his Russian Football National League debut for FC Torpedo Moscow on 16 March 2012 in a game against FC Mordovia Saransk.
