= Artyom Delkin =

Russian professional football player

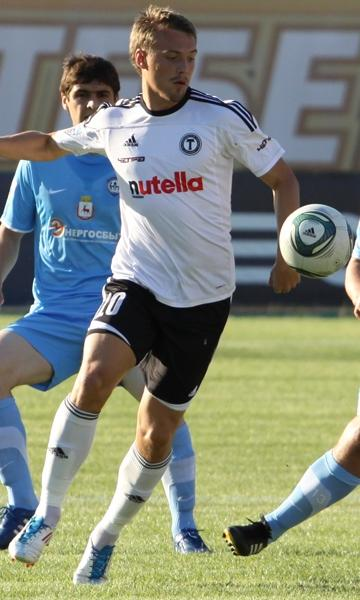

Personal information
- Full name: Artyom Valeryevich Delkin
- Date of birth: 2 August 1990 (age 36)
- Place of birth: Samara, Russia
- Height: 1.81 m (5 ft 11 1/2 in)
- Position: Forward

Youth career
- Voskhod Samara
- Konoplyov football academy

Senior career*
Years	Team	Apps	(Gls)
2006–2007	FC Krylia Sovetov-SOK Dimitrovgrad	34	(5)
2008–2009	FC Togliatti	46	(21)
2009–2010	FC Nizhny Novgorod	9	(0)
2010	→ FC KAMAZ Naberezhnye Chelny (loan)	18	(2)
2011–2012	FC Torpedo Vladimir	44	(14)
2012–2015	FC Krylia Sovetov Samara	38	(3)
2015	→ FC Tyumen (loan)	13	(3)
2015–2018	FC Orenburg	69	(24)
2017	→ FC Tambov (loan)	14	(3)
2018–2019	FC Nizhny Novgorod	32	(3)
2019–2020	FC Yenisey Krasnoyarsk	25	(5)
2020–2022	FC Akron Tolyatti	64	(13)
2022–2023	FC Volgar Astrakhan	33	(8)
2023	FC Chernomorets Novorossiysk	19	(0)
2024	FC Volga Ulyanovsk	13	(2)

International career^{‡}
2007	Russia U-17	5	(1)
2008	Russia U-18	7	(3)
2009	Russia U-19	4	(3)
2012	Russia U-21	10	(4)
- * Club domestic league appearances and goals as of 8 June 2024 ‡ National team caps and goals as of 15 August 2012

Artyom Valeryevich Delkin (Russian: Артём Валерьевич Делькин; born 2 August 1990) is a Russian professional football player who plays as a forward.

== Club career ==
He made his Russian Football National League debut for FC Krylia Sovetov Samara on 22 July 2012 in a game against FC Terek Grozny.
