= Khramov =

Khramov or Hramov (Russian: Храмов, from храм meaning temple) is a Russian male surname; its feminine counterpart is Khramova or Hramova. It may refer to:

- Aleksandr Khramov (born 1989), Russian football player
- Andrey Khramov (born 1981), Russian orienteering competitor
- Tatyana Khramova (born 1970), Belarusian Olympic high jumper
