= Kontsedalov =

Kontsedalov (Russian: Концеда́лов) is a Russian surname. Notable people with the surname include:

- Aleksei Kontsedalov (born 1990), Russian footballer, brother of Roman
- Roman Kontsedalov (born 1986), Russian footballer
