= Nemov =

Nemov (Russian: Немов) is a Russian masculine surname, its feminine counterpart is Nemova. Notable people with the surname include:

- Alexei Nemov (born 1976), Russian gymnast
- Pyotr Nemov (born 1983), Russian footballer
