= Konoplyov football academy =

Russian youth football academy

Coordinates: 53°30′38″N 49°14′29″E

Yuri Konoplyov football academy (Russian: Академия футбола имени Юрия Коноплёва) is a Russian youth football academy based in Togliatti.

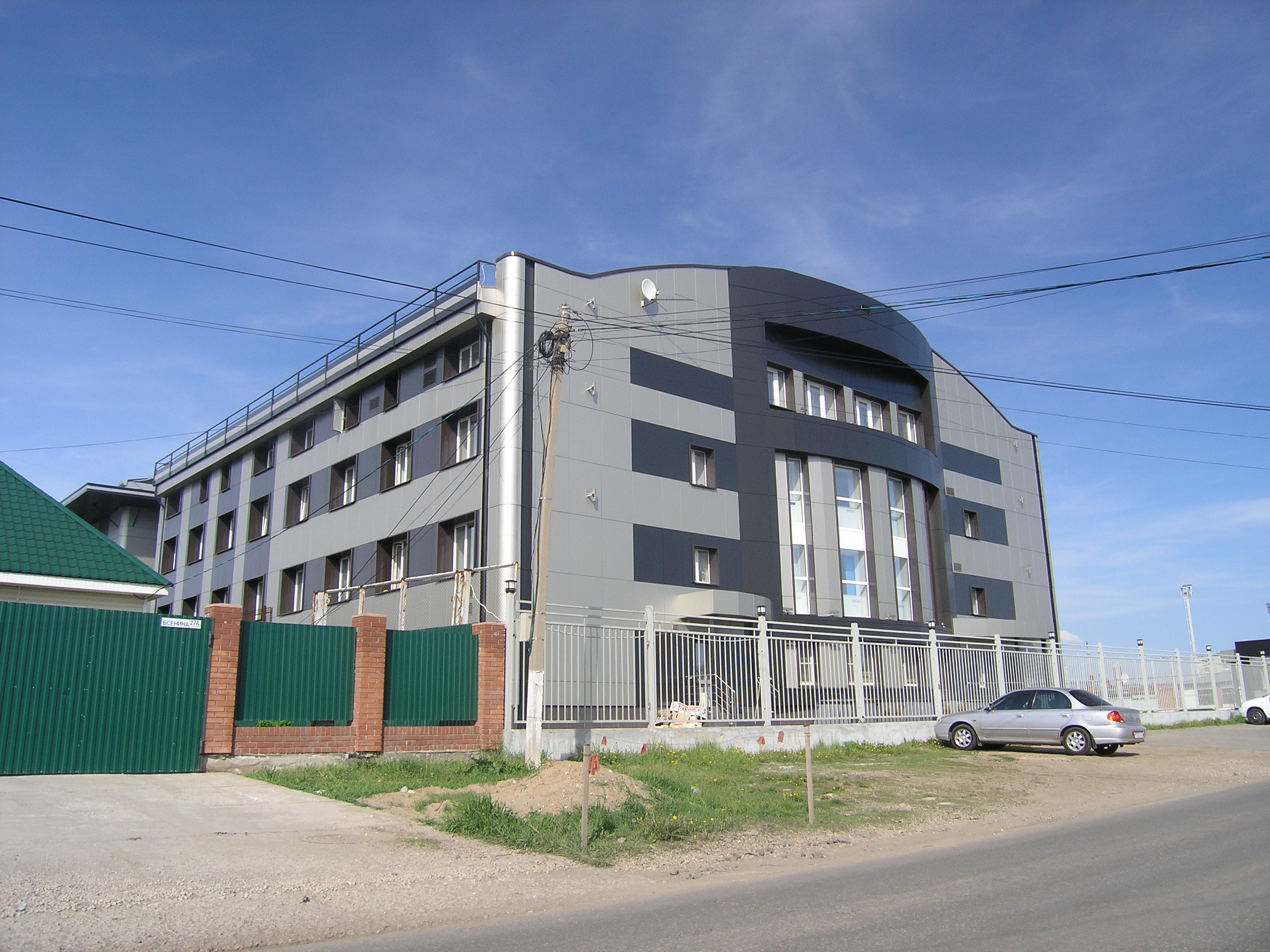
Office

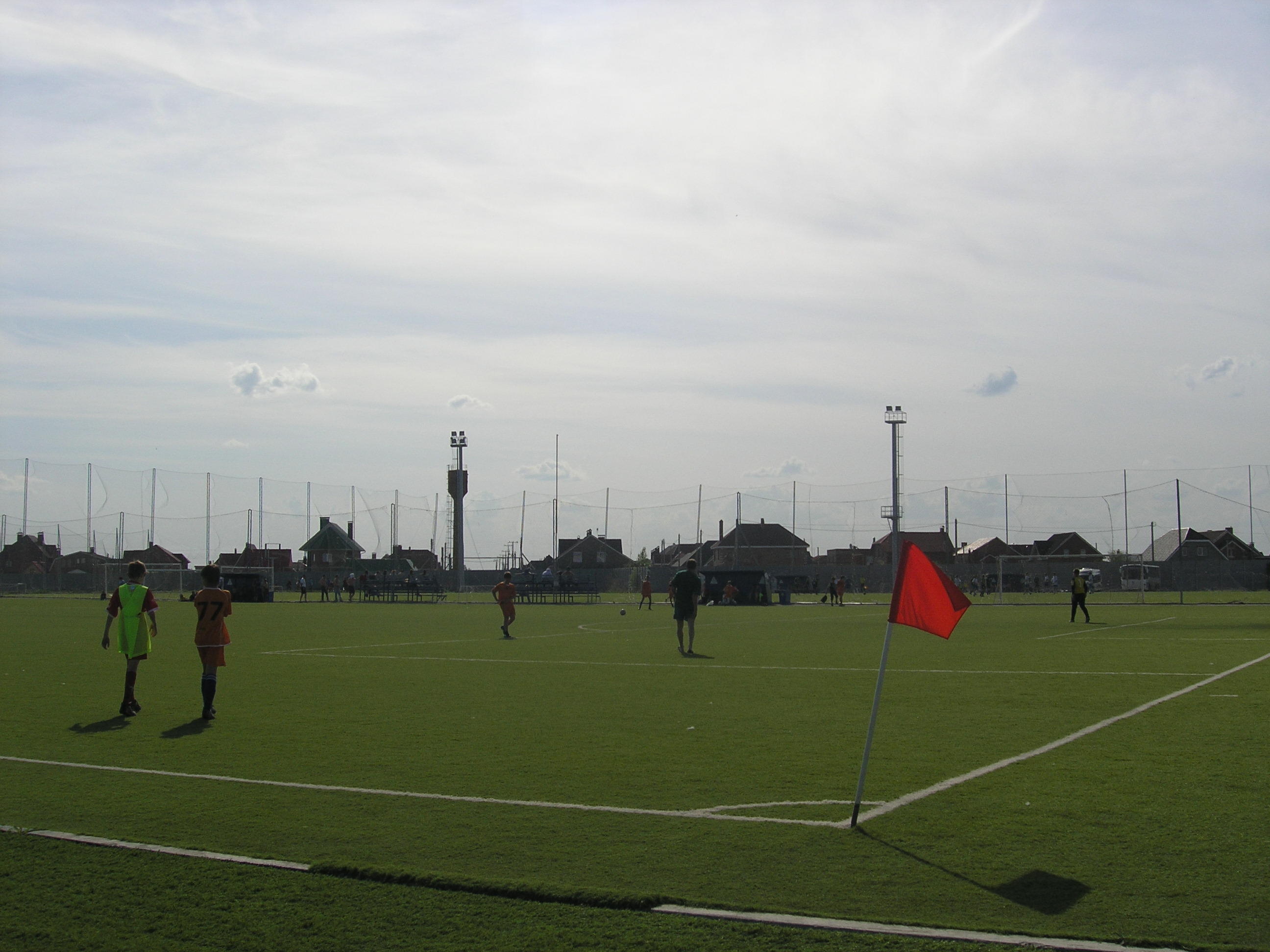
Field

== History ==
The academy was founded in 2003 as SDYuShOR Krylia Sovetov. In 2007 the name was changed in honor of its founder Yuri Konoplyov, a local businessman who died in 2006 aged 39. Since then it is sponsored mainly by Abramovich's National Academy of Football. In June 2022, the academy became affiliated with FC Akron Tolyatti.

== Present ==
The academy comprises age-group teams ranging from Under-8's up to Under-18's. Team of Under-18's plays in the Amateur Football League, 4th level of Russian football, under the name of Togliatti-dubl. Russian Second Division's FC Akademiya Togliatti was also fed on the academy players, as was FC Togliatti, now defunct. As of 2015–16 season, the academy was feeding FC Lada-Togliatti. The senior squad of the academy originally received a license to play in the third-tier Russian Professional Football League for the 2017–18 season, but before the season started, it became the feeder team to FC Krylia Sovetov-2 Samara instead.

== Alumni ==
The best known alumni of the Konoplyov academy are Russian international midfielder Alan Dzagoev and 2006 UEFA U-17 Championship winners Anton Vlasov, Yevgeni Korotayev, Denis Shcherbak, Igor Gorbatenko, Dmitri Ryzhov and Roman Savenkov.

The list of alumni also includes: Aleksandr Khramov (forward), Artur Yusupov (midfielder), Yevgeni Pesegov (midfielder), Aleksandr Stolyarenko (defender), Vladimir Drukovskiy (defender), Maksim Fyodorov (midfielder), Sergei Borodin (goalkeeper), Ivan Stain (midfielder), Kirill Kholodov (midfielder), Anton Kilin (midfielder), Albert Egorov (goalkeeper), Aleksandr Vasilev (goalkeeper), Dmitri Kabutov (midfielder), Aleksandr Korotayev (forward), Denis Magadiyev (defender), Konstantin Ryabov (midfielder), Mikhail Nemtsov (midfielder), Viktor Kuzmichyov (midfielder), Nikolai Ivannikov (forward), Timofei Margasov (defender), Anatoliy Nikolayev (defender), Roman Eremeev (midfielder), Dmitri Golubev (defender), Roman Khalilullov (midfielder), Sergei Nakhlestkin (midfielder), Sergei Sipatov (forward), Albert Sharipov (midfielder), Mikheil Gorelishvili (midfielder), Vladimir Azarov (midfielder), Grigori Morozov (defender), Artyom Leonov (goalkeeper), Dmitri Korobov (midfielder), Sergei Volkov (goalkeeper), Daniil Melikhov (midfielder), Dzhamaldin Khodzhaniyazov (defender), Amir Natkho (midfielder), Andrei Titov (forward), Andrei Boyko (midfielder), Evgeniy Evstigneev (forward), Daur Kvekveskiri (forward), Ilya Viznovich (forward), Gennadi Kiselyov (midfielder), Yegor Golenkov (forward), Danila Khotulyov (defender), Aleksandr Filtsov (goalkeeper), Eduard Sukhanov (midfielder).

Three more academy alumni made their Russia national football team debut in 2015: Roman Zobnin and Dmitri Yefremov. Stanislav Kritsyuk and Ilya Kutepov made their national team debut in 2016. Roman Yemelyanov was called up to the squad but has not played any official games yet. Ilzat Akhmetov debuted in 2019. Maksim Mukhin and Arsen Zakharyan made their debut in 2021, Denis Makarov was called up for the first time in 2021. Maksim Glushenkov debuted in 2022.

== See also ==
- FC Lada
- FC Akron
- FC Akademiya
- PFC Krylia Sovetov Samara
