= Viktor Svezhov =

Russian footballer

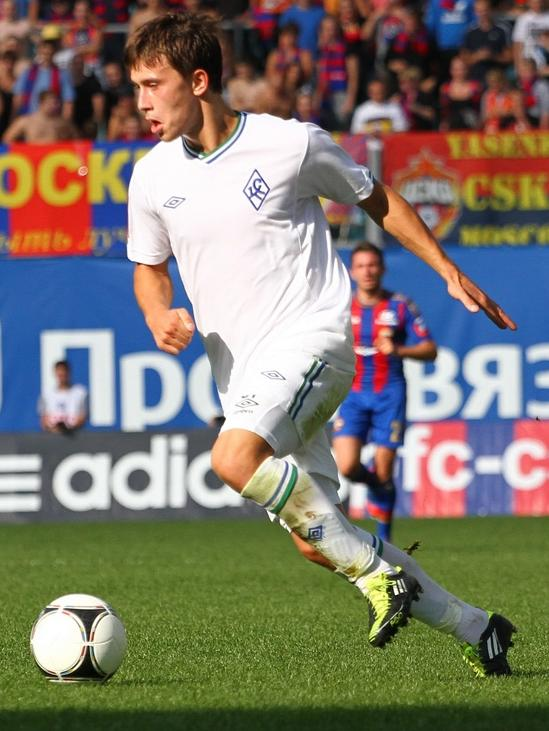
- Svezhov with Krylia Sovetov in 2012

Personal information
- Full name: Viktor Vladimirovich Svezhov
- Date of birth: 17 May 1991 (age 35)
- Place of birth: Krasnogorsk, Moscow Oblast, Soviet Union
- Height: 1.75 m (5 ft 9 in)
- Position: Midfielder

Youth career
- 2007–2009: Dynamo Moscow

Senior career*
Years	Team	Apps	(Gls)
2009–2011	Dynamo Moscow	8	(0)
2010	→ Tom Tomsk (loan)	1	(0)
2011	→ Luch-Energiya Vladivostok (loan)	34	(1)
2012–2014	Krylia Sovetov Samara	21	(0)
2013–2014	→ Torpedo Moscow (loan)	15	(1)
2014–2015	Sibir Novosibirsk	24	(7)
2015–2017	Fakel Voronezh	45	(1)
2017–2018	Baltika Kaliningrad	34	(0)
2018–2019	Sibir Novosibirsk	22	(2)
2019	Minsk	13	(0)
2020–2021	Istiklol	8	(0)
2021–2023	KAMAZ Naberezhnye Chelny	48	(1)
2023	Chayka Peschanokopskoye	5	(0)

International career
2008	Russia U17	12	(1)
2010	Russia U19	10	(4)
2012	Russia U21	1	(1)
- * Club domestic league appearances and goals

Viktor Vladimirovich Svezhov (Russian: Виктор Владимирович Свежов; born 17 May 1991) is a Russian former professional footballer.

== Club career ==
He made his professional debut in the Russian Premier League on 24 May 2009 for Dynamo Moscow in a game against Zenit St. Petersburg.

== Career statistics ==
=== Club ===
As of match played 4 July 2020

Club	Season	League			National Cup		Continental		Other		Total	
Club	Season	Division	Apps	Goals	Apps	Goals	Apps	Goals	Apps	Goals	Apps	Goals
Dynamo Moscow	2009	Russian Premier League	8	0	0	0	2	0	-		10	0
Dynamo Moscow	2010	Russian Premier League	0	0	0	0	-		-		0	0
Dynamo Moscow	2011–12	Russian Premier League	0	0	0	0	-		-		0	0
Dynamo Moscow	Total		8	0	0	0	2	0	-	-	10	0
Tom Tomsk (loan)	2010	Russian Premier League	1	0	0	0	-		-		1	0
Luch Vladivostok (loan)	2011–12	Russian FNL	34	1	3	0	-		-		37	1
Krylia Sovetov	2011–12	Russian Premier League	7	0	0	0	-		-		7	0
Krylia Sovetov	2012–13	Russian Premier League	14	0	1	1	-		0	0	15	1
Krylia Sovetov	2013–14	Russian Premier League	0	0	0	0	-		-		0	0
Krylia Sovetov	Total		21	0	1	1	-	-	0	0	22	2
Torpedo Moscow (loan)	2013–14	Russian FNL	15	1	1	0	-		-		16	1
Sibir Novosibirsk	2014–15	Russian FNL	24	7	2	0	-		-		26	7
Fakel Voronezh	2015–16	Russian FNL	27	1	1	1	-		-		28	2
Fakel Voronezh	2016–17	Russian FNL	18	0	0	0	-		-		18	0
Fakel Voronezh	Total		45	1	1	1	-	-	-	-	46	2
Baltika Kaliningrad	2017–18	Russian FNL	34	0	1	0	-		-		35	0
Sibir Novosibirsk	2018–19	Russian FNL	22	2	0	0	-		-		22	2
Minsk	2019	Belarusian Premier League	13	0	0	0	-		-		13	0
Istiklol	2020	Tajik League	8	0	0	0	2	0	1	0	11	0
Career total			225	12	9	2	4	0	1	0	239	14

== Honors ==
Istiklol

- Tajikistan Higher League (1): 2020
- Tajik Supercup (1): 2020
