= Aleksandr Khramov =

Russian footballer

Personal information
- Full name: Aleksandr Aleksandrovich Khramov
- Date of birth: 4 February 1989 (age 37)
- Height: 1.86 m (6 ft 1 in)
- Position: Forward

Youth career
- FC Krylia Sovetov Samara

Senior career*
Years	Team	Apps	(Gls)
2006	Krylia Sovetov-SOK Dimitrovgrad	13	(0)
2007–2010	FC Krylia Sovetov Samara	1	(0)
2010	→ FC Gornyak Uchaly (loan)	10	(0)
- * Club domestic league appearances and goals

Aleksandr Aleksandrovich Khramov (Russian: Александр Александрович Храмов; born 4 February 1989) is a former Russian professional football player.

== Club career ==
He made his Russian Premier League debut on 13 March 2010 for FC Krylia Sovetov Samara in a game against FC Zenit St. Petersburg.
