= Sergey Veremko =

Belarusian footballer

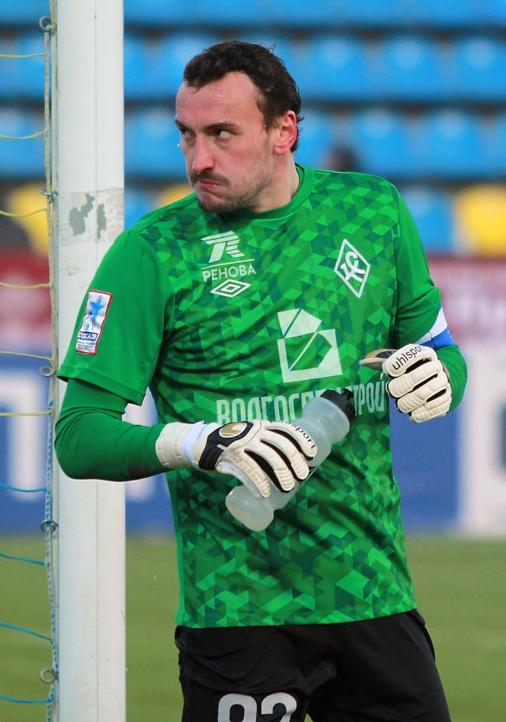
- Veremko with Krylia Sovetov in 2012

Personal information
- Full name: Sergey Nikolayevich Veremko
- Date of birth: 16 October 1982 (age 44)
- Place of birth: Minsk, Belarusian SSR
- Height: 1.90 m (6 ft 3 in)
- Position: Goalkeeper

Team information
- Current team: Torpedo-BelAZ Zhodino (GK coach)

Youth career
- 2000–2002: Dinamo Minsk

Senior career*
Years	Team	Apps	(Gls)
2000	Dinamo-2 Minsk	6	(0)
2000–2002	Dinamo-Yuni Minsk	48	(0)
2003–2005	Arsenal Kharkiv	34	(0)
2004	→ Helios Kharkiv	1	(0)
2005	Kharkiv	0	(0)
2006–2007	Neman Grodno	43	(0)
2008–2010	BATE Borisov	71	(0)
2011	Sevastopol	10	(0)
2011–2015	Krylia Sovetov Samara	75	(0)
2014–2015	→ Ufa (loan)	5	(0)
2015–2016	Levadiakos	9	(0)
2016–2017	BATE Borisov	10	(0)
2018–2021	Minsk	48	(0)
2022–2023	Torpedo-BelAZ Zhodino	0	(0)

International career
2008–2014	Belarus	26	(0)

Managerial career
- 2018–2021: Minsk (GK coach)
- 2022–: Torpedo-BelAZ Zhodino (GK coach)
- * Club domestic league appearances and goals

Sergey Nikolayevich Veremko (Belarusian: Сяргей Мікалаевіч Верамко; Russian: Сергей Николаевич Веремко; born 16 October 1982) is a Belarusian football coach and a former goalkeeper. He is a goalkeeping coach with Torpedo-BelAZ Zhodino. In addition to being part of club teams in Belarus, Russia, Ukraine, and Greece, he also played for the Belarus national team, which he has captained.

== Club career ==
=== Early career ===
Veremko was born in Minsk and made his first steps in professional football with local outfit FC Dinamo-Juni Minsk in the early 2000s.

=== BATE Borisov ===
Veremko made his official debut for BATE Borisov on 16 March 2008, in a 1–0 win over Veras in a 1/8 final match for the Belarusian Cup. On 13 August 2008, Veremko was one of the key players for BATE Borisov in the Belarusians' away game against Bulgarian side Levski Sofia (third qualifying round of the UEFA Champions League), parrying a Georgi Ivanov shot from the penalty spot (the penalty kick had been awarded after a Veremko foul on Georgi Hristov) and making a number of other notable saves to deny the Levski Sofia forwards. The match ended 1–0 and a 1–1 home draw in Barysaw was sufficient to see the Belarusians progress to the group stages of the UEFA Champions League for the first time in their history. (Veremko did not play in the home leg due to a suspension attributable to accumulated yellow cards). However, Veremko was the starting goalkeeper in all of his team's games in the UEFA Champions League group stage, earning himself 1 yellow card during the Belarusians' 1–1 away draw against Zenit Saint Petersburg on 21 October 2008 (after a mild altercation with Portuguese forward Danny). On 9 April 2009, Veremko was shown a red card in the 17th minute of BATE Borisov's 1–0 away loss to Naftan Novopolotsk in a Belarusian Cup game for handling the ball outside his penalty area.

During the 2010 season, Veremko managed to keep a clean sheet in his first six games, but was subsequently injured. On 19 May 2010, he returned to first team action in a 1–0 home win against Dinamo Brest. Remarkably, he conceded his first goals for the season in a 2–1 home loss against FC Minsk on 13 June 2010. In the process, Veremko set a Belarusian Premier League record by keeping a clean sheet for 1016 consecutive minutes. His record lasted until June 2015 when it was eclipsed by another BATE Borisov player (Syarhey Chernik) who went 1073 minutes without allowing a goal. In September 2010, Veremko managed to save three successive penalties that he faced – on 16 September 2010, he denied Artem Milevskyi from the spot in a 2–2 away draw against Dynamo Kyiv in a UEFA Europa League game, on 22 September 2010, he parried a penalty that was taken by Stanislaw Drahun in a 3–1 home loss against Dinamo Minsk in a Belarusian Premier League match, and on 30 September 2010, he was up to the task against AZ Alkmaar's Jonathas in a 4–1 home win in a UEFA Europa League match. During his first stay with the team from Borisov, Veremko appeared in 118 matches in total - 71 in the league, 15 in the Belarusian Cup, 1 in the Belarusian Super Cup, 19 in the UEFA Champions League, and 12 in the UEFA Europa League.

=== PFC Sevastopol ===
In early January 2011, it was revealed that Veremko will sign a 2.5-year contract with Ukrainian Premier League side PFC Sevastopol, with the player claiming that he had reached the limit for his professional development in the Belarusian Premier League. The transfer was finalized on 14 January 2011. On 25 January 2011, Veremko made his unofficial debut for his new team, playing the first half of a 1–1 draw with Kazakh side Shakhter Karagandy. His official debut came on 3 March 2011, in a 1–0 home loss against table leaders Shakhtar Donetsk, with Veremko playing the full 90 minutes. Veremko quickly established himself as a starter for the side, but the team was relegated to the Ukrainian First League at the end of the season.

=== Krylya Sovetov Samara ===
In late July 2011, he signed a three-year contract with Russian club Krylya Sovetov Samara, being envisioned as a replacement for Raïs M'Bolhi. On 1 August 2011, Veremko debuted as a starter in a 1–1 home draw with Amkar Perm in a Russian Premier League match. In December 2011, he was selected as Krylya Sovetov's 2011 player of the year, with fellow Belarusian Sergei Kornilenko coming in second place. Veremko was also given the captain's armband on a full-time basis by manager Andrey Kobelev. On 24 July 2012, Veremko extended his contract with the Samara team until 2016. During the second half of the 2013–14 Russian Premier League season, Veremko faced competition for the goalkeeping spot from Ján Mucha and Denis Vavilin. He left the team in early July 2014, after it had been relegated from the Russian Premier League. During his time with the Samara-based team, Veremko attracted interest from Russian powerhouse Spartak Moscow.

=== Ufa ===
On 10 July 2014, Veremko signed a one-year loan contract with newly promoted Russian Premier League club Ufa. On 3 August 2014, Veremko made his first appearance in a competitive match in a 2–0 league loss against Kuban Krasnodar. He struggled to become a regular first team player, making only five league appearances.

=== Levadiakos ===
On 28 August 2015, Veremko signed a one-year loan contract with Super League Greece club Levadiakos. He made his official debut on 28 October, in a 3–0 loss against Panathinaikos in a Cup match.

=== Return to BATE Borisov ===
On 1 July 2016, Veremko rejoined BATE Borisov, which was shortly after the departure of Syarhey Chernik who had signed for Nancy. He kept a clean sheet on his return debut, a 2–0 win over Finnish side SJK Seinäjoki in the first leg of a second qualifying round Champions League match held on 12 July, repeating the performance in his comeback match in the Belarusian Premier League on 29 July against Dinamo Brest, which also finished in a 2–0 win for the team from Barysaw. On 6 August 2017, Veremko was sent off after the final whistle in a 1–0 loss against Minsk following an argument with the referee Vitaliy Sevostayanik, subsequently receiving a 5-match ban. Veremko is currently in second place in the all-time appearance list for a BATE Borisov goalkeeper, having participated in 135 games in all competitions, trailing Alyaksandr Fyedarovich.

=== FC Minsk ===
In January 2018, Veremko reached an agreement with Minsk, signing a contract with the team. He officially debuted on 30 March 2018, in a 0–0 draw with Luch Minsk in a league match. On 11 August 2019, Veremko remained on the bench for the fixture against Dinamo Minsk, but was red-carded after the match for insulting language directed at Vitaliy Sevostayanik, the same official who had dismissed him in the previous incident while he was a BATE player, and was banned for five games by the disciplinary committee of the football federation. In February 2020, Veremko was offered the opportunity to be player-coach of the team.

== International career ==
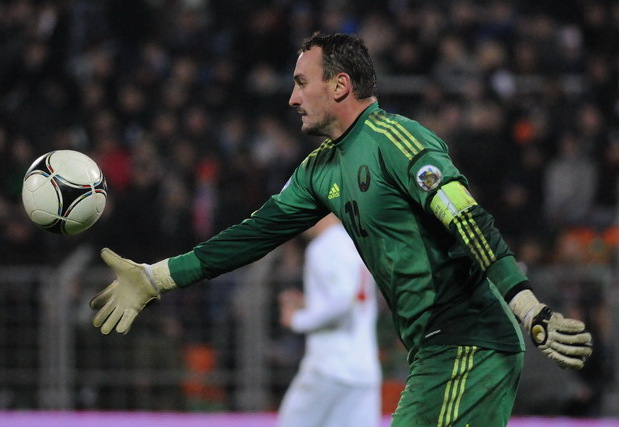
Veremko playing for Belarus in 2012.

Since 2008 Veremko has been a regular member of the Belarus national team. On 2 February 2008, Veremko made his debut for the national side in a 2–0 win against Iceland, which was the opening match of the unofficial Malta International Football Tournament 2008. His first stint between the sticks in a competitive game was in a 3–1 away win against Andorra on 10 September 2008 in a 2010 World Cup qualifier, with Veremko only conceding after a penalty kick. On 3 March 2010, Veremko earned his third cap in the 3:1 win against Armenia in a friendly match. On 26 March 2011, Veremko started in net in the Euro 2012 away qualifier against Albania due to an injury to first choice goalkeeper Yuri Zhevnov and made a number of good saves, though the only goal of the game was scored after a misunderstanding between him and defender Alyaksandr Martynovich. During Bernd Stange's tenure as head coach Veremko was mostly the second choice goalkeeper, but he became a starter after Georgi Kondratiev was appointed as manager. On 15 August 2012, he captained his country for the first time in a 2–1 win over Armenia in a friendly match. Veremko retained the captain's armband for the first two 2014 World Cup qualifiers – against Georgia and France. Veremko played in seven of Belarus' eight matches during the 2014 World Cup qualification campaign (remaining on the substitute's bench only for the last match of the qualifiers - a 2–1 away loss against Spain). Timofei Kalachev took over the captain's armband for the Euro 2016 qualifiers.

== Personal life ==
Veremko is married and has a daughter and a son.

== Honours ==
BATE Borisov

- Belarusian Premier League champion: 2008, 2009, 2010, 2016, 2017
- Belarusian Cup winner: 2009–10
- Belarusian Super Cup winner: 2010, 2017

Individual

- Best goalkeeper in the Belarusian Premier League – 2007, 2008, 2009, 2010 (holds record for most individual awards won)
- Listed among the 22 best players in the Belarusian Premier League by the Belarusian Football Federation – 2007, 2008, 2009, 2010
- FC Krylya Sovetov player of the year – 2011
