= Viktor Kuzmichyov =

Russian footballer

Personal information
- Full name: Viktor Igorevich Kuzmichyov
- Date of birth: 19 March 1992 (age 34)
- Place of birth: Makhachkala, Russia
- Height: 1.75 m (5 ft 9 in)
- Position: Midfielder

Youth career
- Konoplyov football academy

Senior career*
Years	Team	Apps	(Gls)
2009	FC Togliatti	8	(0)
2010	FC Saturn Moscow Oblast	0	(0)
2011–2012	FC Anzhi Makhachkala	0	(0)
2012	FC Rubin Kazan	0	(0)
2013–2014	FC Krylia Sovetov Samara	3	(0)
2016	FC Domodedovo Moscow	6	(1)

International career
2007	Russia U-15	3	(1)
2008	Russia U-17	3	(2)
2010	Russia U-18	2	(0)
2011	Russia U-19	2	(0)
2012	Russia U-21	3	(0)
- * Club domestic league appearances and goals

Viktor Igorevich Kuzmichyov (Russian: Виктор Игоревич Кузьмичёв; born 19 March 1992) is a Russian former professional football player. He played as a midfielder. He could also play as a defender.
