= Dmitri Golubev (footballer, born 1992) =

Russian footballer

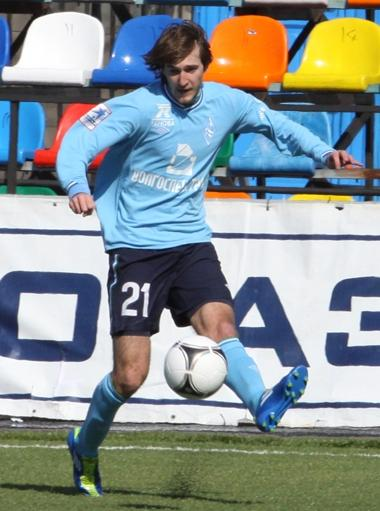
- Golubev with Krylia Sovetov in 2012

Personal information
- Full name: Dmitri Vadimovich Golubev
- Date of birth: 1 March 1992 (age 34)
- Place of birth: Totskoye, Russia
- Height: 1.80 m (5 ft 11 in)
- Position: Defender

Youth career
- Konoplyov football academy

Senior career*
Years	Team	Apps	(Gls)
2009–2011	FC Akademiya Togliatti	69	(4)
2012–2014	FC Krylia Sovetov Samara	16	(0)
2013	→ FC Mordovia Saransk (loan)	1	(0)
2014	→ FC Yenisey Krasnoyarsk (loan)	0	(0)
2015	FC Zenit-Izhevsk	6	(1)
2015–2016	FC Volga-Olimpiyets Nizhny Novgorod	13	(2)
2016–2017	FC Luch-Energiya Vladivostok	6	(0)
2017–2018	FC Zenit-Izhevsk	13	(0)
2018–2019	FC Yevpatoriya		
2019–2022	FC Nosta Novotroitsk	63	(1)
2022–2023	FC Mashuk-KMV Pyatigorsk	18	(0)

International career
2009	Russia U-17	7	(1)
2010	Russia U-18	4	(0)
2011	Russia U-19	3	(0)
2012	Russia U-20	2	(0)
2012–2013	Russia U-21	10	(0)
- * Club domestic league appearances and goals

Dmitri Vadimovich Golubev (Russian: Дмитрий Вадимович Голубев; born 1 March 1992) is a Russian former professional football player.

== Club career ==
He made his debut in the Russian Premier League on 11 March 2012 for FC Krylia Sovetov Samara in a game against FC Rostov. In the summer 2013 he was loaned out to Mordovia Saransk and played there for the first half of the 2013–14 season.
