= Luis Nery Caballero =

Paraguayan footballer (born 1990)

Luis Caballero
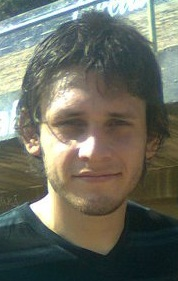

Personal information
- Full name: Luis Nery Caballero Chamorro
- Date of birth: 22 April 1990 (age 36)
- Place of birth: Asunción, Paraguay
- Height: 1.85 m (6 ft 1 in)
- Position: Forward

Team information
- Current team: Club General Martín Ledesma
- Number: 20

Youth career
- 2005–2009: Olimpia Asunción

Senior career*
Years	Team	Apps	(Gls)
2009–2012	Olimpia Asunción	62	(17)
2012–2014	Krylya Sovetov	55	(14)
2014–2017	Atlas	45	(8)
2016	→ Olimpia Asunción (loan)	9	(1)
2017	→ Guaraní (loan)	4	(0)
2017–2018	Nacional Asunción	14	(1)
2018–2019	Guaraní	21	(7)
2019	→ Deportes Tolima (loan)	9	(2)
2019–2020	Sportivo Luqueño	13	(1)
2021	River Plate	14	(0)
2022–2023	Deportivo Capiatá	0	(0)
2023–	Club General Martín Ledesma	–	(–)

International career
2008–2009	Paraguay U20	7	(1)
2011–2013	Paraguay	12	(2)
- * Club domestic league appearances and goals as of 3 December 2021

Luis Nery Caballero Chamorro (born 22 April 1990) is a Paraguayan footballer who plays as a forward for Club General Martín Ledesma of the Paraguayan Primera División B. His father Luis (1962–2005) was a member of the Paraguay national football team at the 1986 FIFA World Cup in Mexico, and Caballero's older brother Luis Carlos also played for the Paraguayan national football team.

== Career ==
Caballero started his football career with Olimpia Asunción, where he made his debut in a 2–0 victory over Club Guaraní in the 1997 Copa Libertadores group stage, at the Estadio Olimpia on 10 November 2005, in Asunción.

=== Club career ===
In the Summer of 2012, Caballero signed a three-year contract with Russian Premier League side Krylya Sovetov. His debut for Krylya Sovetov came on 22 July 2012 in a one all draw at home to Terek Grozny, with Caballero scoring an 82nd-minute penalty for the home side. He ended his first season in Russia scoring 8 league goals in 27 appearances, with another 2 goals coming in Krylya Sovetov's 7–2 aggregate win over Spartak Nalchik in the Relegation play-offs.

=== Return to Olimpia ===
On 26 December 2015, it was reported by D10 Paraguay that Caballero would join Club Olimpia Asunción on loan from Club Atlas for a six-month period.

== Club statistics ==
As of 7 January 2015

Club performance			League		Cup		Continental		Other (Note: Includes Russian Relegation Play-offs)		Total	
Season	Club	League	Apps	Goals	Apps	Goals	Apps	Goals	Apps	Goals	Apps	Goals
2012–13	Krylya Sovetov	Russian Premier League	27	8	1	0	-		1	2	29	10
2013–14	Krylya Sovetov	Russian Premier League	28	6	1	0	-		2	0	31	6
2014–15	Atlas	Liga MX	17	4	1	0	-		-		18	4
Total	Russia		55	14	2	0	—		3	2	60	16
Total	Mexico		17	4	1	0	—		—		18	4
Career total			55	14	3	0	—		3	2	60	16

== Honours ==
Olimpia

- Primera División: 1
  - Winner: 2011 Clausura

== International goals ==
Scores and results list Paraguay's goal tally first.

#	Date	Venue	Opponent	Score	Result	Competition
1.	15 November 2012	Estadio Feliciano Cáceres, Luque	Guatemala	1–0	3–1	Friendly
2.	26 March 2013	Estadio Olímpico Atahualpa, Quito	Ecuador	1–0	1–4	2014 World Cup qualifier
