= Bruno Teles =

Brazilian footballer (born 1986)

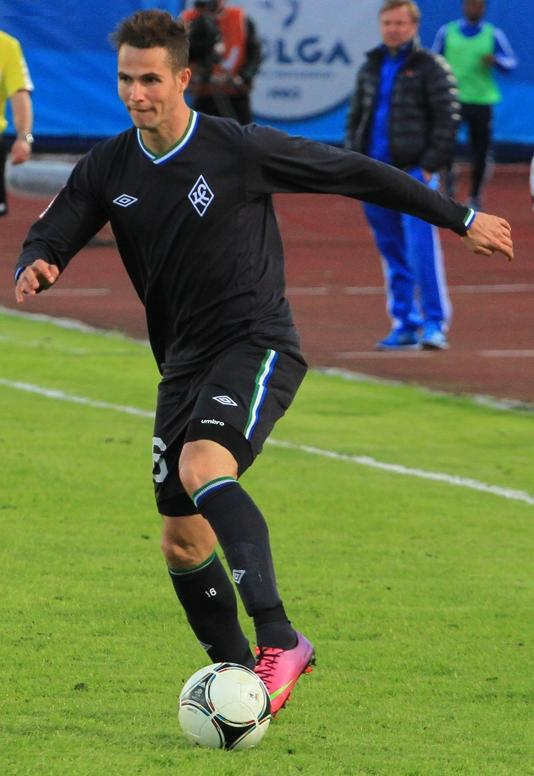
- Teles playing for Krylia Sovetov in 2013

Personal information
- Full name: Bruno Martins Teles
- Date of birth: 1 May 1986 (age 40)
- Place of birth: Alvorada, Brazil
- Height: 1.83 m (6 ft 0 in)
- Position: Left back

Youth career
- 2004–2005: Grêmio

Senior career*
| Years | Team | Apps | (Gls) |
| 2006–2009 | Grêmio | 9 | (0) |
| 2008 | → Portuguesa (loan) | 6 | (0) |
| 2009 | → Sport Recife (loan) | 4 | (0) |
| 2009 | → Juventude (loan) | 14 | (0) |
| 2010–2012 | Vitória Guimarães | 60 | (5) |
| 2012–2015 | Krylia Sovetov | 45 | (2) |
| 2015–2016 | Vasco da Gama | 0 | (0) |
| 2016 | Mogi Mirim | 13 | (0) |
| 2016–2017 | America Mineiro | 7 | (0) |
| 2017–2018 | Rio Ave | 15 | (1) |
| 2018–2020 | Paços de Ferreira | 48 | (0) |
| 2020–2021 | Académica de Coimbra | 29 | (4) |
| 2021–2022 | Chaves | 6 | (0) |
- * Club domestic league appearances and goals

Bruno Martins Teles (born 1 May 1986), known as Bruno Teles, is a Brazilian former footballer who played as a left back.

== Career ==
Born in Alvorada, Tocantins, Teles began his career at Grêmio. He also had loans to Portuguesa, Sport Recife and Juventude.

In February 2010, he moved abroad for the first time, signing for Portugal's Vitória de Guimarães until the end of the Primeira Liga season. He moved on again in September 2012 for Krylia Sovetov of the Russian Premier League on a two-year deal; the fee was estimated at €1 million with Vitória getting a 30% share and the player himself the rest.

Teles signed for Vasco da Gama, the club he supported as a boy, for the last four months of the 2015 Campeonato Brasileiro Série A, but did not play. At the start of the new year, he signed for Mogi Mirim for the 2016 Campeonato Paulista. In June, he joined América Mineiro for the national league campaign.

On 13 January 2017, Teles came back to Portugal's top flight, joining Rio Ave on an 18-month deal. He scored once for the club, a last-minute winner in a 2–1 home victory against Vitória Setúbal on 30 September.

Remaining in Northern Portugal, Teles signed a two-year deal for Paços de Ferreira on 1 July 2018, and won promotion from the LigaPro in his first season.

In July 2021, he signed with Chaves.

== Honours ==
Grêmio

- Campeonato Gaúcho: 2007

Krylia Sovetov

- Russian Professional Football League: 2014–15
