= Aleksandre Amisulashvili =

Georgian footballer

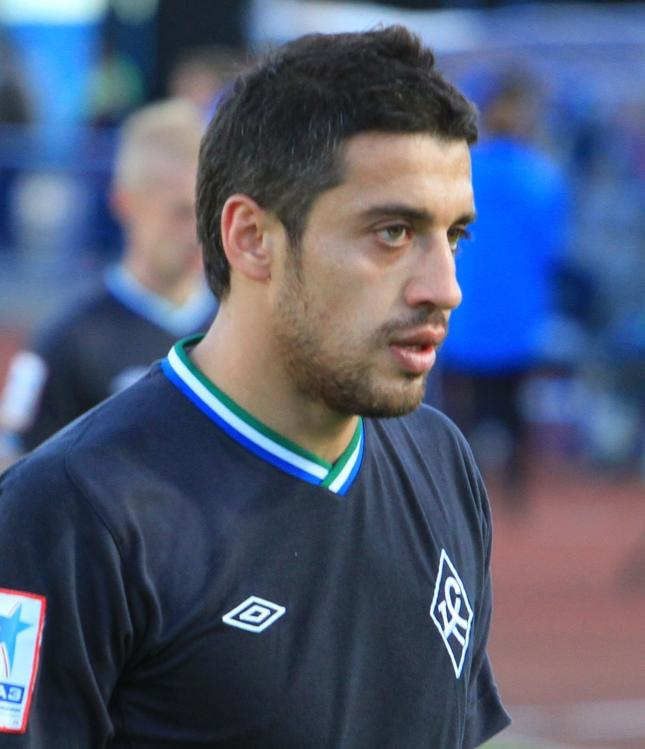
- Playing for PFC Krylia Sovetov Samara in 2013

Personal information
- Date of birth: 20 August 1982 (age 44)
- Place of birth: Telavi, Georgian SSR
- Height: 1.87 m (6 ft 2 in)
- Position: Defender

Youth career
- Kakheti Telavi

Senior career*
Years	Team	Apps	(Gls)
1998–1999	Kakheti Telavi	25	(3)
1999–2000	Torpedo Kutaisi	7	(0)
2000–2001	Iberia Samtredia	11	(0)
2001–2003	Dinamo Tbilisi	85	(11)
2004–2005	Dynamo Kyiv	0	(0)
2004	→ Dynamo-2 Kyiv	17	(1)
2004	→ Dynamo-3 Kyiv	1	(0)
2005	→ Dnipro Dnipropetrovsk (loan)	0	(0)
2005	Dinamo Tbilisi	15	(0)
2006	→ Tavriya Simferopol (loan)	10	(0)
2006	→ Shinnik Yaroslavl (loan)	18	(1)
2007–2010	Spartak Nalchik	98	(10)
2010–2011	Kayserispor	22	(1)
2011–2012	FC Krasnodar	54	(1)
2013–2014	Krylia Sovetov Samara	42	(1)
2014–2015	Inter Baku	23	(2)
2015–2016	Karşıyaka SK	14	(2)
2016	Dinamo Tbilisi	20	(2)

International career
2000	Georgia U19	2	(0)
2001–2002	Georgia U21	4	(1)
2002–2016	Georgia	50	(4)
- * Club domestic league appearances and goals

Aleksandre Amisulashvili (Georgian: ალექსანდრე ამისულაშვილი; born 20 August 1982) is a retired Georgian international footballer.

== Career ==
In June 2014 Amisulashvili signed for Inter Baku in Azerbaijan. Previously he played for Krylia Sovetov.

== Career statistics ==
Club performance			League		Cup		Continental		Total	
Season	Club	League	Apps	Goals	Apps	Goals	Apps	Goals	Apps	Goals
1998–99	Kakheti Telavi	Umaglesi Liga	25	3			-		25	3
1999–00	Torpedo Kutaisi	Umaglesi Liga	7	0			-		7	0
2000–01	Iberia Samtredia	Umaglesi Liga	11	0			-		11	0
2000–01	Torpedo Kutaisi	Umaglesi Liga	7	0			-		7	0
2001–02	Dinamo Tbilisi	Umaglesi Liga	32	4			-		32	4
2002–03	Dinamo Tbilisi	Umaglesi Liga	31	4			-		31	4
2003–04	Dinamo Tbilisi	Umaglesi Liga	22	3			-		22	3
2007	Spartak Nalchik	Russian Premier League	29	3			-		29	3
2008	Spartak Nalchik	Russian Premier League	28	3			-		28	3
2009	Spartak Nalchik	Russian Premier League	30	4			-		30	4
2010	Spartak Nalchik	Russian Premier League	11	1			-		11	1
2010–11	Kayserispor	Süper Lig	21	2	1	0	-		22	2
2011–12	Krasnodar	Russian Premier League	37	1	3	0	-		40	1
2012–13	Krasnodar	Russian Premier League	17	0	2	0	-		12	0
2012–13	Krylia Sovetov	Russian Premier League	10	0	2	0	-		12	0
2013–14	Krylia Sovetov	Russian Premier League	28	1	2	0	-		30	1
2014–15	Inter Baku	Azerbaijan Premier League	23	2	0	0	4	0	27	2
2015–16	Karşıyaka	Süper Lig	14	2	1	0	-		15	2
2015–16	Dinamo Tbilisi	Umaglesi Liga	0	0			-		0	0
Total	Georgia		135	14	0	0	-		135	14
Total	Ukraine		40	1	0	0	-		40	1
Total	Turkey		35	4	2	0	-		37	4
Total	Russia		190	13	9	0	-		199	13
Total	Azerbaijan		23	2	0	0	4	0	27	2
Career total			423	34	11	0	4	0	438	34

=== International goals ===
Scores and results list Georgia's goal tally first.

Goal	Date	Venue	Opponent	Score	Result	Competition
1.	30 March 2005	Mikheil Meskhi Stadium, Tbilisi, Georgia	Turkey	1–1	2–5	2006 FIFA World Cup qualification
2.	29 February 2012	Mikheil Meskhi Stadium, Tbilisi, Georgia	Albania	2–1	2–1	Friendly
3.	15 August 2012	Stade Municipal, Differdange, Luxembourg	Luxembourg	2–0	2–1	Friendly
4.	16 November 2015	Qemal Stafa Stadium, Tirana, Albania	Albania	1–0	2–2	Friendly
