= Yevgeni Balyaikin =

Russian footballer

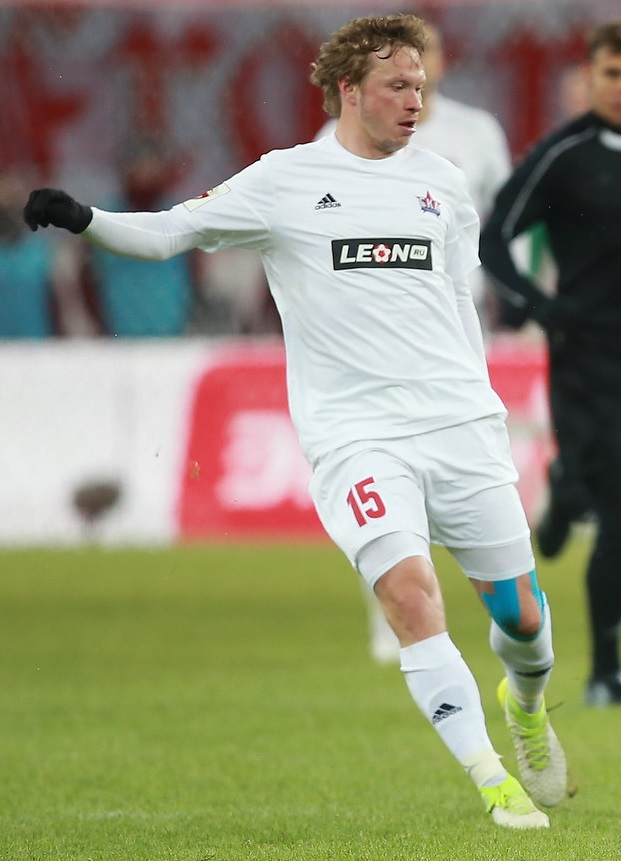
- Balyaikin with SKA-Khabarovsk in 2018

Personal information
- Full name: Yevgeni Viktorovich Balyaikin
- Date of birth: 19 May 1988 (age 38)
- Place of birth: Bratsk, Russia
- Height: 1.83 m (6 ft 0 in)
- Positions: Defender; midfielder

Senior career*
Years	Team	Apps	(Gls)
2004–2006	FC Sibiryak Bratsk	72	(8)
2007–2012	FC Rubin Kazan	44	(0)
2011–2012	→ FC Tom Tomsk (loan)	29	(1)
2012–2014	FC Krylia Sovetov Samara	40	(0)
2016–2017	FC Tom Tomsk	32	(0)
2017–2018	FC SKA-Khabarovsk	14	(0)
2019–2020	FC Ararat Yerevan	2	(0)
2020	Masis FC	4	(0)
2020	FC Tom Tomsk	9	(0)
2021	FC Rustavi	12	(0)

International career
2009–2010	Russia U21	9	(2)
2011	Russia-2	1	(0)
- * Club domestic league appearances and goals

Yevgeni Viktorovich Balyaikin (Russian: Евгений Викторович Баляйкин; born 19 May 1988) is a Russian former footballer who played as central midfielder.

== Club career ==
=== Career statistics ===
As of 8 December 2017

Club	Season	League			Cup		Continental		Other		Total	
Club	Season	Division	Apps	Goals	Apps	Goals	Apps	Goals	Apps	Goals	Apps	Goals
FC Sibiryak Bratsk	2004	Second Division	12	0	0	0	–		–		12	0
FC Sibiryak Bratsk	2005	Second Division	29	4	1	0	–		–		30	4
FC Sibiryak Bratsk	2006	Second Division	31	4	1	0	–		–		32	4
FC Sibiryak Bratsk	Total		72	8	2	0	0	0	0	0	74	8
FC Rubin Kazan	2007	Premier Liga	4	0	0	0	–		–		4	0
FC Rubin Kazan	2008	Premier Liga	10	0	2	0	–		–		12	0
FC Rubin Kazan	2009	Premier Liga	17	0	1	0	1	0	–		19	0
FC Rubin Kazan	2010	Premier Liga	13	0	0	0	3	0	–		16	0
FC Rubin Kazan	Total		44	0	3	0	4	0	0	0	51	0
FC Tom Tomsk	2011–12	Premier Liga	29	1	1	0	–		–		30	1
FC Krylia Sovetov Samara	2012–13	Premier Liga	19	0	2	0	–		2 (Note: Two appearances in relegation play-offs)	0	23	0
FC Krylia Sovetov Samara	2013–14	Premier Liga	11	0	0	0	–		–		11	0
FC Krylia Sovetov Samara	2014–15	FNL	10	0	1	0	–		–		11	0
FC Krylia Sovetov Samara	Total		40	0	3	0	0	0	2	0	45	0
FC Tom Tomsk	2015–16	FNL	12	0	0	0	–		1 (Note: One appearances in promotion play-offs)	0	13	0
FC Tom Tomsk	2016–17	Premier Liga	19	0	1	0	–		–		20	0
FC Tom Tomsk	Total (2 spells)		60	1	2	0	0	0	1	0	63	1
FC SKA-Khabarovsk	2017–18	Premier Liga	10	0	2	0	–		–		12	0
Career totals			226	9	12	0	4	0	3	0	245	9

== International career ==
Balyaikin was a part of the Russia U21 side that was competing in the 2011 European Under-21 Championship qualification.
