= Ivan Taranov (footballer) =

Russian footballer

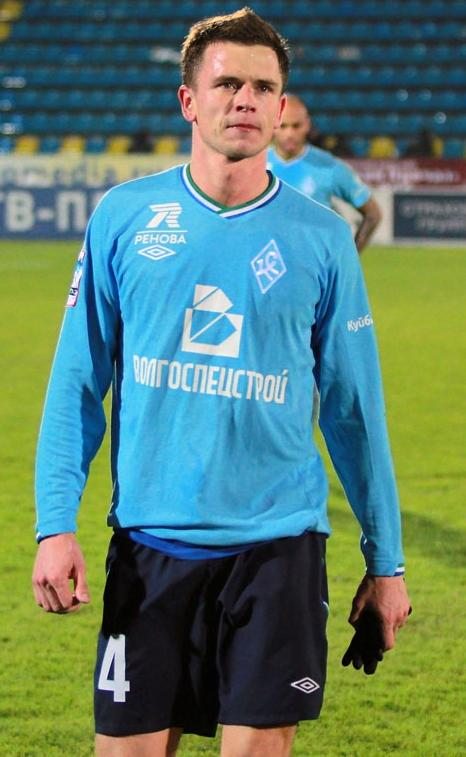
- Taranov with Krylia Sovetov in 2012

Personal information
- Full name: Ivan Nikolayevich Taranov
- Date of birth: 22 June 1986 (age 40)
- Place of birth: Tomsk, Russian SFSR
- Height: 1.85 m (6 ft 1 in)
- Position: Central defender

Youth career
- FC Chernomorets Novorossiysk

Senior career*
Years	Team	Apps	(Gls)
2002–2007	PFC CSKA Moscow	27	(0)
2008–2018	FC Krylia Sovetov Samara	229	(8)
2018–2019	FC Krasnodar-2	43	(5)

International career
2005–2008	Russia U-21	19	(2)
2004–2011	Russia-2	3	(0)
- * Club domestic league appearances and goals

Ivan Nikolayevich Taranov (Russian: Иван Николаевич Таранов; born 22 June 1986) is a Russian former football defender.

== Club career ==
Spotted playing at a footballing school in Prokhladny, Taranov was spirited away to a boarding school by Black Sea side FC Chernomorets Novorossiysk where he spent two years learning his craft. After a season in the Novorossiysk side's reserve team in 2001 Taranov opted to move on to Moscow to join CSKA's reserves. Taranov represented his country at Under-19 level, making the step up to the U21 side with a substitute appearance against Luxembourg in October 2005. He made his Russian Premier League debut for CSKA on 23 October 2005 in a game against FC Amkar Perm. he played in CSKA's 2006 Russian Cup final victory against Spartak Moscow and has recently been featured in the first team more often.

He received first senior national team call-up against Republic of Macedonia in 2006, but did not play.

He made 3 appearances in UEFA Champions League 2006-07.

He made a late substitute appearance in FC Krasnodar's 2018–19 UEFA Europa League Round of 16 game against Valencia. On 23 December 2019, his contract with FC Krasnodar was terminated by mutual consent.

== Career statistics ==
As of 7 May 2012

Club	Div	Season	League		Cup		Europe		Total	
Club	Div	Season	Apps	Goals	Apps	Goals	Apps	Goals	Apps	Goals
CSKA Moscow	D1	2005	1	0	0	0	0	0	1	0
CSKA Moscow	D1	2006	13	0	1	0	3	0	17	0
CSKA Moscow	D1	2007	12	0	3	1	2	0	17	1
CSKA Moscow	Total		26	0	4	1	5	0	35	1
Krylia Sovetov Samara	D1	2008	18	2	0	0	—		18	2
Krylia Sovetov Samara	D1	2009	25	0	1	0	1	0	27	0
Krylia Sovetov Samara	D1	2010	26	1	1	0	—		27	1
Krylia Sovetov Samara	D1	2011–12	32	1	1	0	—		33	1
Krylia Sovetov Samara	D1	2012–13	0	0	0	0	—		0	0
Krylia Sovetov Samara	Total		101	4	3	0	1	0	105	4
Career total			127	4	7	1	6	0	140	5
