= Aleksandr Yeliseyev =

Russian footballer

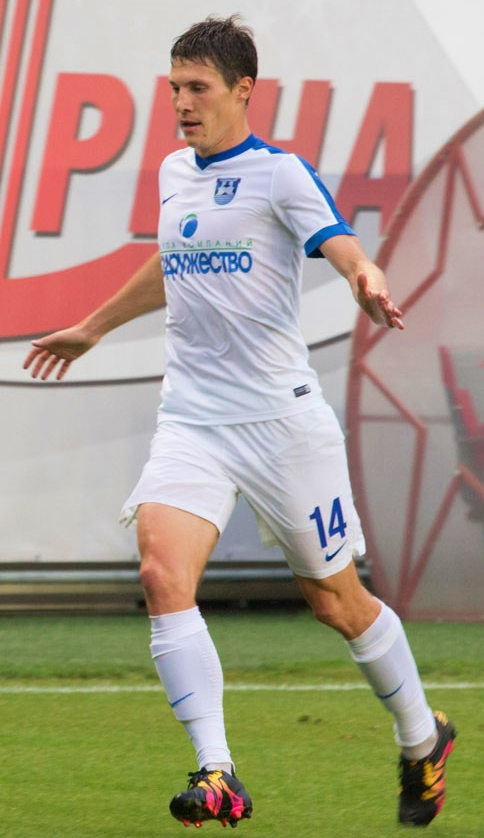
- Yeliseyev with Baltika in 2016

Personal information
- Full name: Aleksandr Vladimirovich Yeliseyev
- Date of birth: 15 November 1991 (age 35)
- Place of birth: Moscow, Russian SFSR
- Height: 1.83 m (6 ft 0 in)
- Positions: Defender; midfielder

Youth career
- 2009: FC Moscow
- 2010–2011: FC Krylia Sovetov Samara

Senior career*
Years	Team	Apps	(Gls)
2011–2015	FC Krylia Sovetov Samara	48	(3)
2011–2012	→ FC Shinnik Yaroslavl (loan)	21	(2)
2015–2016	FC Volgar Astrakhan	14	(0)
2016–2017	FC Baltika Kaliningrad	28	(2)
2017–2020	FC Torpedo Moscow	82	(7)
2021	FC Veles Moscow	11	(1)
2021–2022	FC Chayka Peschanokopskoye	20	(4)
2022–2025	FC Tekstilshchik Ivanovo	100	(5)
2025–2026	FC Sibir Novosibirsk	26	(3)

International career
2010	Russia U-19	6	(1)
2011	Russia U-20	6	(1)
- * Club domestic league appearances and goals as of 13 June 2026

Aleksandr Vladimirovich Yeliseyev (Russian: Александр Владимирович Елисеев; born 15 November 1991) is a Russian former professional football player.

== Club career ==
He made his Russian Premier League debut for FC Krylia Sovetov Samara on 7 May 2011 in a game against FC Tom Tomsk.
