= Benoît Angbwa =

Cameroonian footballer (born 1982)

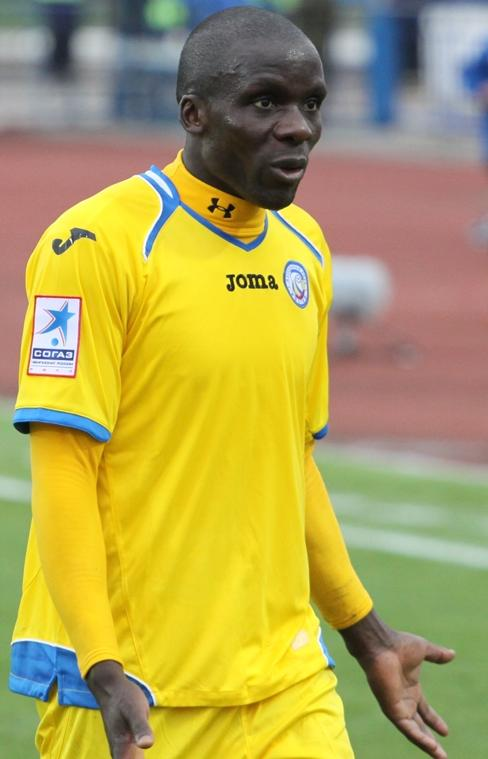
- Angbwa with Rostov in 2012

Personal information
- Full name: Benoît Christian Angbwa Ossoemeyang
- Date of birth: 1 January 1982 (age 44)
- Place of birth: Garoua, Cameroon
- Height: 1.77 m (5 ft 10 in)
- Position: Right back

Youth career
- 2000–2001: Fovu Baham

Senior career*
Years	Team	Apps	(Gls)
2001–2002	Montpellier	0	(0)
2002–2006	Nacional Montevideo	38	(4)
2005	→ Lille (loan)	20	(0)
2006–2008	Krylia Sovetov Samara	44	(0)
2008–2011	Saturn Moscow Oblast	71	(3)
2011–2012	Anzhi Makhachkala	29	(4)
2012–2013	Rostov	14	(0)
2013	Krylia Sovetov Samara	17	(1)
2013–2014	Anzhi Makhachkala	9	(0)
2016–2017	Grande-Synthe		
Total		242	(12)

International career
2005–2013	Cameroon	18	(1)

Managerial career
- 2021–2022: Grande-Synthe
Medal record
Men's football
Representing Cameroon
Africa Cup of Nations
Runner-up	2008 Ghana
- * Club domestic league appearances and goals

Benoît Christian Angbwa Ossoemeyang (born 1 January 1982) is a Cameroonian professional football coach and a former player. He normally played as a defender in a right back position, but could also play on the right side of midfield.

== Club career ==
Angbwa was born in Garoua, North Region.

In January 2011, Angbwa joined Anzhi Makhachkala on a three-year deal from FC Saturn. Halfway through his contract with Anzhi, Angbwa left and signed a three-year contract with FC Rostov on 19 June 2012. After only eight months Angbwa again moved, this time signing a two-year contract with Krylia Sovetov in February 2013. On 30 August 2013 Angbwa was on the move again, re-signing with Anzhi Makhachkala.

In March 2016, Angbwa joined Grande-Synthe.

== International career ==
Angbwa made his debut for the Cameroon national team on 9 February 2005, starting in a friendly against the Senegal in France. Cameroon won the match 1–0.

He participated in the 2006 Africa Cup of Nations, appearing in the group-stage match against the DR Congo. Cameroon were eliminated in the quarter-finals after drawing 1–1 with the Ivory Coast and subsequently losing in the penalty shoot-out.

Angbwa was included in Cameroon's final squad for the 2008 Africa Cup of Nations. Cameroon reached the final but finished as runners-up after losing 1–0 to the Egypt. Angbwa was named among the substitutes for the final but did not make an appearance.

On 11 November 2011, Angbwa scored his first international goal in a friendly against the Sudan. He scored in the second half as Cameroon secured a 3–1 victory. Angbwa continued to represent Cameroon until 2013.

== Managerial career ==
In May 2021, Angbwa was appointed as manager of his former club Grande-Synthe.

== Career statistics ==
Appearances and goals by club, season and competition
Club	Season	League			National Cup		League Cup		Continental		Other (Note: Includes Russian relegation play-offs)		Total	
Club	Season	Division	Apps	Goals	Apps	Goals	Apps	Goals	Apps	Goals	Apps	Goals	Apps	Goals
Nacional	2002	Uruguayan Primera División	2	0					—		—		2	0
Nacional	2003	Uruguayan Primera División	34	3					—		—		34	3
Nacional	2004	Uruguayan Primera División	2	1					—		—		2	1
Nacional	Total		38	4	0	0	0	0	0	0	0	0	38	4
Lille (loan)	2004–05	Ligue 1	20	0			1	0	—		—		21	0
Krylia Sovetov	2006	Russian Premier League	21	0			—		—		—		21	0
Krylia Sovetov	2007	Russian Premier League	23	0	6	0	—		—		—		29	0
Krylia Sovetov	Total		44	0	6	0	0	0	0	0	0	0	50	0
Saturn Ramenskoye	2008	Russian Premier League	24	0	0	0	—		—		—		24	0
Saturn Ramenskoye	2009	Russian Premier League	23	3	0	0	—		—		—		23	3
Saturn Ramenskoye	2010	Russian Premier League	24	0	1	0	—		—		—		25	0
Saturn Ramenskoye	Total		71	3	1	0	0	0	0	0	0	0	72	3
Anzhi Makhachkala	2011–12	Russian Premier League	29	4	1	0	—		—		—		30	4
Rostov	2012–13	Russian Premier League	14	0	2	0	—		—		—		16	0
Krylia Sovetov	2012–13	Russian Premier League	11	1	0	0	—		—		2	0	13	1
Krylia Sovetov	2013–14	Russian Premier League	6	0	0	0	—		—		—		6	0
Krylia Sovetov	Total		17	1	0	0	0	0	0	0	2	0	19	1
Anzhi Makhachkala	2013–14	Russian Premier League	9	0	1	0	—		7	0	—		17	0
Career total			242	12	11	0	1	0	7	0	2	0	263	12

== Honours ==
Nacional

- Uruguayan Primera División: 2002

Cameroon

- African Cup of Nations: runner-up, 2008
