= Konstantin Kertanov =

Russian footballer

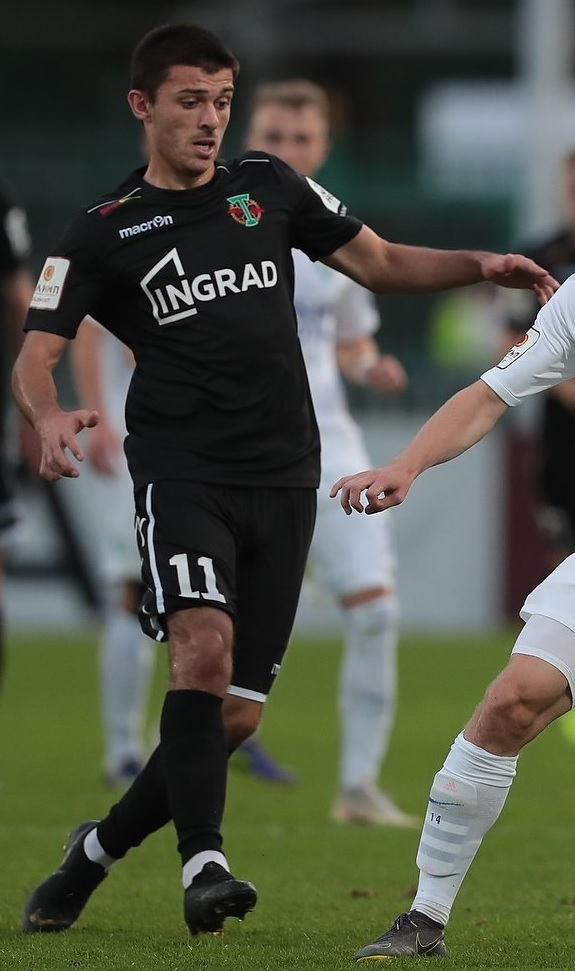
- Kertanov with Torpedo Moscow in 2019

Personal information
- Full name: Konstantin Elbrusovich Kertanov
- Date of birth: 22 July 1995 (age 31)
- Place of birth: Beslan, Russia
- Height: 1.76 m (5 ft 9 in)
- Position: Midfielder

Team information
- Current team: FC Chelyabinsk
- Number: 18

Youth career
- FC Beslan

Senior career*
Years	Team	Apps	(Gls)
2011–2012	FC Dynamo Kostroma	0	(0)
2012–2013	FC Krylia Sovetov Samara	1	(0)
2013–2014	FC Kuban Krasnodar	0	(0)
2014–2021	FC Torpedo Moscow	132	(10)
2021–2023	FC Veles Moscow	67	(3)
2023–2024	FC Kuban Krasnodar	14	(0)
2024–	FC Chelyabinsk	69	(2)
- * Club domestic league appearances and goals as of 16 May 2026

Konstantin Elbrusovich Kertanov (Russian: Константин Эльбрусович Кертанов; born 22 July 1995) is a Russian professional football player who plays for FC Chelyabinsk.

== Club career ==
He made his debut in the Russian Premier League on 8 December 2012 for FC Krylia Sovetov Samara in a game against FC Amkar Perm.
