= Roman Grigoryan =

Russian footballer

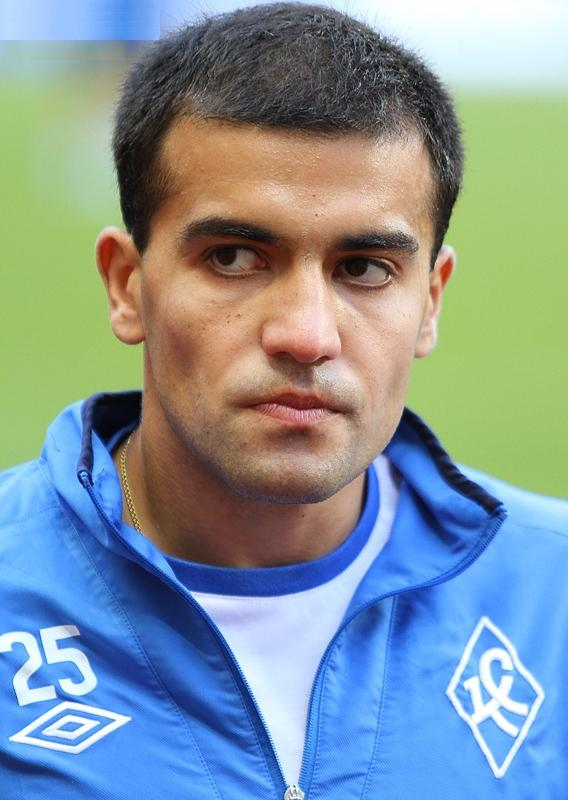
- Grigoryan with Krylia Sovetov in 2011

Personal information
- Full name: Roman Bagdasarovich Grigoryan
- Date of birth: 14 September 1982 (age 44)
- Place of birth: Moscow, Russia
- Height: 1.71 m (5 ft 7 1/2 in)
- Position: Midfielder

Senior career*
Years	Team	Apps	(Gls)
2001	FC Torpedo-ZIL Moscow	0	(0)
2001	FC Vityaz Podolsk	10	(0)
2002	FC Kolomna	18	(1)
2004	FC Titan Moscow	28	(5)
2005	FC Vityaz Podolsk	32	(5)
2006	FC Metallurg-Kuzbass Novokuznetsk	33	(9)
2007–2009	FC Vityaz Podolsk	101	(43)
2010–2011	FC Shinnik Yaroslavl	54	(11)
2011–2013	FC Krylia Sovetov Samara	22	(2)
2013	FC Vityaz Podolsk	15	(5)
2014	FC Neftekhimik Nizhnekamsk	9	(1)
2014–2015	FC Tambov	43	(19)
2016	FC Armavir	24	(4)
2017	FC Tambov	8	(1)
- * Club domestic league appearances and goals

Roman Bagdasarovich Grigoryan (Russian: Роман Багдасарович Григорян; born 14 September 1982) is a Russian former professional footballer.

== Honours ==
- Russian Professional Football League Zone Center Top Goalscorer: 2015–16 (8 goals).
