= Dzmitry Verkhawtsow =

Belarusian footballer (born 1986)

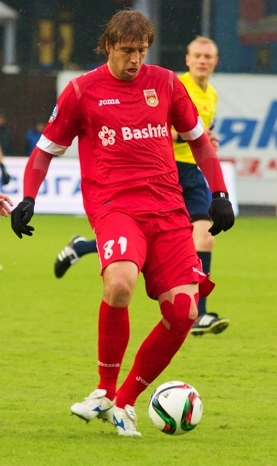
- Verkhawtsow with Ufa in 2015

Personal information
- Full name: Dzmitry Mikalayevich Verkhawtsow
- Date of birth: 10 October 1986 (age 40)
- Place of birth: Mogilev, Belarusian SSR, Soviet Union
- Height: 1.90 m (6 ft 3 in)
- Positions: Centre back; defensive midfielder

Youth career
- 2004–2005: Naftan Novopolotsk

Senior career*
Years	Team	Apps	(Gls)
2005–2011	Naftan Novopolotsk	164	(17)
2012–2014	Krylia Sovetov Samara	36	(1)
2014–2015	Ufa	20	(0)
2016	Korona Kielce	12	(1)
2017	Neman Grodno	9	(1)
Total		241	(20)

International career
2006–2009	Belarus U21	19	(2)
2008–2014	Belarus	44	(3)

Managerial career
- 2021: Naftan Novopolotsk (assistant)
- * Club domestic league appearances and goals

Dzmitry Mikalayevich Verkhawtsow (Belarusian: Дзмiтрый Мікалаевіч Верхаўцоў, Russian: Дмитрий Николаевич Верховцов; born 10 October 1986) is a Belarusian football coach and former player. A central defender, he made 44 appearances for the Belarus national team scoring three goals.

== International career ==
On 10 September 2008, in his fourth game for the national side, Verkhawtsow scored a goal in a 2010 FIFA World Cup qualifier against Andorra.

== International goals ==
Score and Result lists Belarus' goals first

#	Date	Venue	Opponent	Score	Result	Competition
1.	10 September 2008	Estadi Comunal d'Andorra la Vella, Andorra la Vella, Andorra	Andorra	1–0	3–1	2010 FIFA World Cup qualification
2.	12 August 2009	Dinamo Stadium, Minsk, Belarus	Croatia	1–2	1–3	2010 FIFA World Cup qualification
3.	11 June 2013	Central Stadium, Gomel, Belarus	Finland	1–1	1–1	2014 FIFA World Cup qualification

== Honours ==
Naftan Novopolotsk

- Belarusian Cup: 2008–09, 2011–12
