= Aleksandr Makarov (goalkeeper) =

Russian footballer

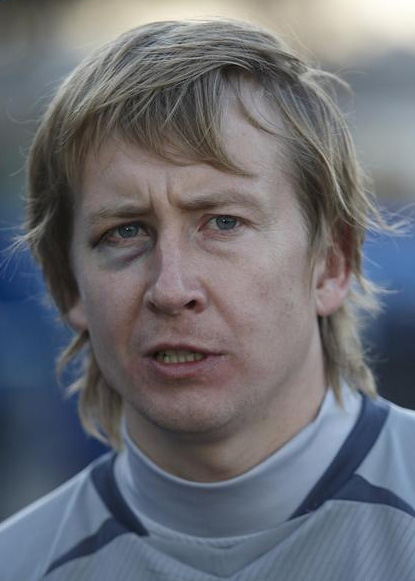

Personal information
- Full name: Aleksandr Viktorovich Makarov
- Date of birth: 23 August 1978 (age 48)
- Place of birth: Morshansk, Soviet Union
- Height: 1.98 m (6 ft 6 in)
- Position: Goalkeeper

Senior career*
Years	Team	Apps	(Gls)
1996–1997	Lokomotiv-d St. Petersburg	14	(0)
1998–1999	Lokomotiv St. Petersburg	0	(0)
2000	Zenit-2 St. Petersburg	21	(0)
2001	Zenit St. Petersburg	0	(0)
2001	Lokomotiv-Zenit-2 St. Petersburg	30	(0)
2002	Zenit St. Petersburg	0	(0)
2003–2004	Anzhi Makhachkala	40	(0)
2004–2007	Krylia Sovetov Samara	47	(0)
2007–2010	Saturn Moscow Oblast	0	(0)
2010	→ Dynamo St. Petersburg (loan)	11	(0)
2011–2012	Anzhi Makhachkala	2	(0)
2012	Sibir Novosibirsk	19	(0)
2013	Krylia Sovetov Samara	0	(0)
- * Club domestic league appearances and goals

Aleksandr Viktorovich Makarov (Russian: Александр Викторович Макаров; born 23 August 1978) is a retired Russian football goalkeeper.
