= Roman Vorobyov =

Russian footballer

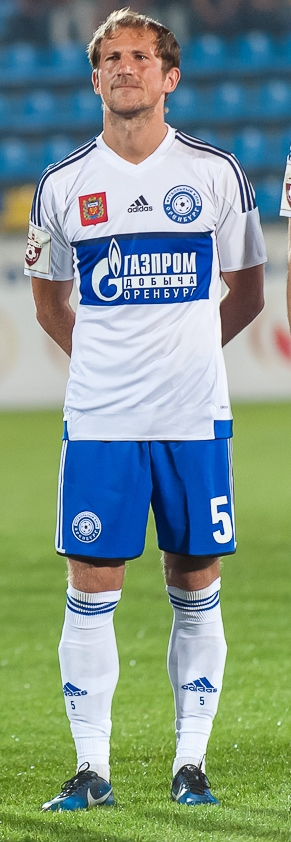
- Vorobyov with FC Orenburg in 2016

Personal information
- Full name: Roman Konstantinovich Vorobyov
- Date of birth: 24 March 1984 (age 42)
- Place of birth: Leningrad, Soviet Union
- Height: 1.75 m (5 ft 9 in)
- Position: Midfielder

Youth career
- Lokomotiv Saint Petersburg
- 2003–2004: Zenit Saint Petersburg

Senior career*
Years	Team	Apps	(Gls)
2005	Fakel Voronezh	7	(2)
2005	Metallurg-Kuzbass Novokuznetsk	17	(4)
2006	Amkar Perm	18	(0)
2007	Khimki	27	(1)
2008–2010	Saturn Moscow Oblast	48	(1)
2011	Krasnodar	9	(0)
2011–2014	Krylia Sovetov Samara	57	(2)
2014	Dynamo St. Petersburg	19	(0)
2015–2018	Orenburg	87	(6)
2018–2019	Rotor Volgograd	22	(0)
2019	Fakel Voronezh	16	(2)
2020–2023	Leningradets	64	(13)

International career
2004–2006	Russia U-21	9	(0)
2011	Russia-2	1	(0)
2007–2008	Russia	2	(0)
- * Club domestic league appearances and goals

Roman Konstantinovich Vorobyov (Russian: Роман Константинович Воробьёв; born 24 March 1984) is a Russian former association football player. As a player, he was versatile, playing as right midfielder, left midfielder and attacking midfielder.

== Club career ==
He made his Russian Premier League debut for FC Amkar Perm on 17 March 2006 in a game against FC Moscow.

He has played for FC Saturn Moscow Oblast, FC Khimki, FC Zenit Saint Petersburg, FC Amkar Perm, FC Metallurg-Kuzbass Novokuznetsk and FC Fakel Voronezh.
