= Aleksei Kontsedalov =

Russian footballer

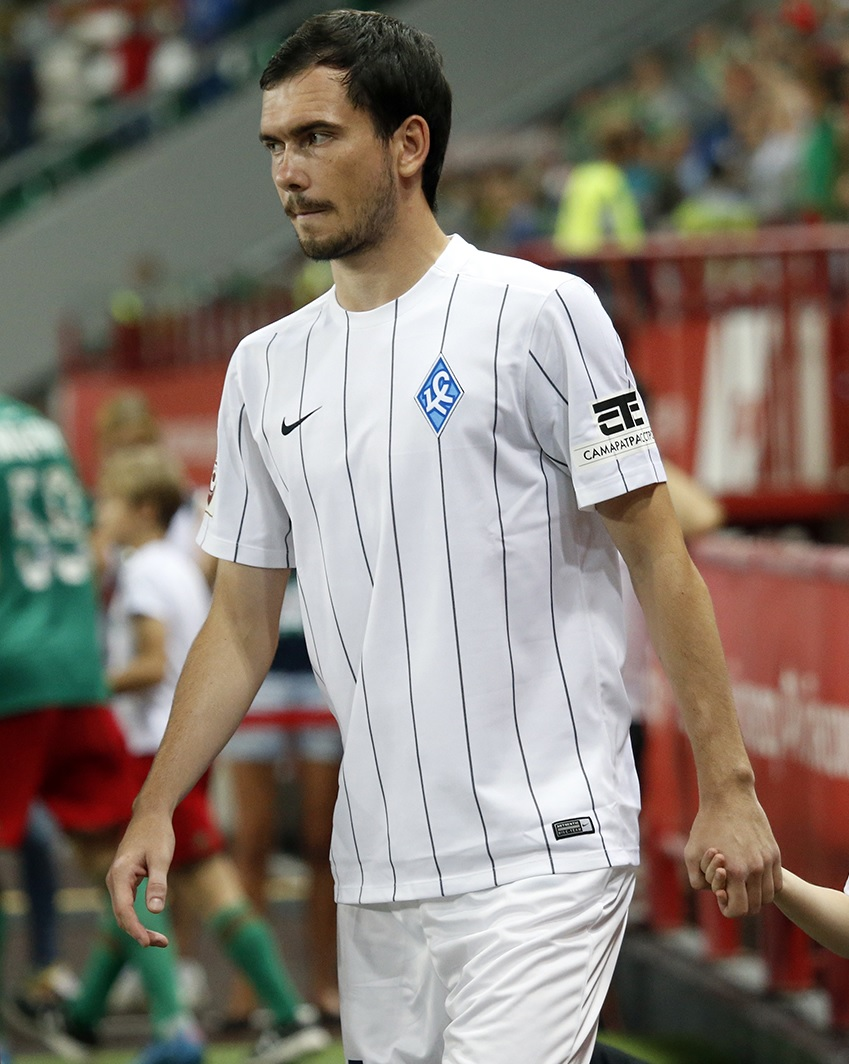
- Kontsedalov with Krylia Sovetov in 2016

Personal information
- Full name: Aleksei Igorevich Kontsedalov
- Date of birth: 24 July 1990 (age 36)
- Place of birth: Valuyki, Russian SFSR
- Height: 1.86 m (6 ft 1 in)
- Position: Defender

Senior career*
Years	Team	Apps	(Gls)
2006–2007	Rostov	0	(0)
2008–2009	Moscow	0	(0)
2010–2016	Krylia Sovetov	89	(0)
2017	Baltika Kaliningrad	14	(1)
2017–2018	Avangard Kursk	25	(0)
2018–2019	Armavir	29	(0)
2020	Dynamo Stavropol	0	(0)
2020	Aktobe	2	(0)
2021	TSK Simferopol	5	(1)
2021–2022	Kyzyltash Bakhchisaray	11	(0)

International career
2010	Russia U-20	1	(0)
- * Club domestic league appearances and goals

Aleksei Igorevich Kontsedalov (Russian: Алексе́й И́горевич Концеда́лов; born 24 July 1990) is a Russian former professional association football player.

== Club career ==
He made his Russian Premier League debut on 9 July 2010 for PFC Krylia Sovetov Samara in a game against FC Rubin Kazan.

In August 2021, Kontsedalov joined Kyzyltash Bakhchisaray.

== Personal life ==
His older brother Roman Kontsedalov is also a professional football player.

== Career statistics ==
As of 1 June 2012

Club	Div	Season	League		Cup		Europe		Total	
Club	Div	Season	Apps	Goals	Apps	Goals	Apps	Goals	Apps	Goals
(Russia) Krylia Sovetov Samara	D1	2010	2	0	0	0	—		2	0
(Russia) Krylia Sovetov Samara	D1	2011–12	18	0	0	0	—		18	0
(Russia) Krylia Sovetov Samara	D1	2012–13	0	0	0	0	—		0	0
(Russia) Krylia Sovetov Samara	Total		20	0	0	0	0	0	20	0
Career total			20	0	0	0	0	0	20	0
