= Pyotr Nemov =

Russian footballer

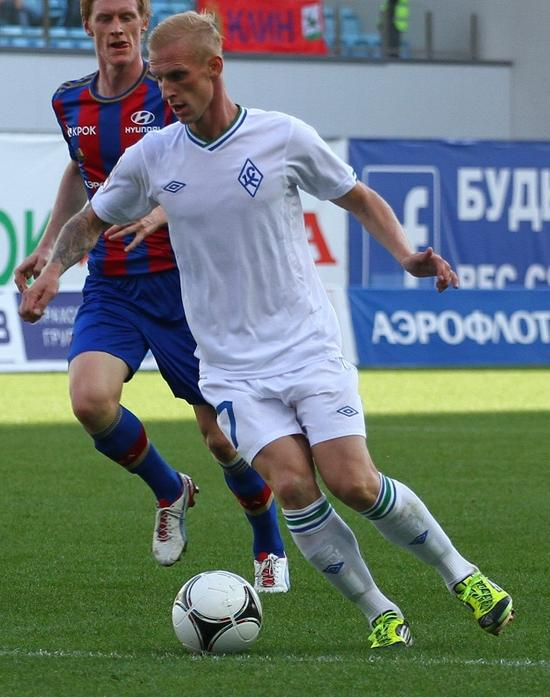
- Nemov with Krylia Sovetov in 2012

Personal information
- Full name: Pyotr Aleksandrovich Nemov
- Date of birth: 18 October 1983 (age 43)
- Place of birth: Oryol, Soviet Union
- Height: 1.80 m (5 ft 11 in)
- Position: Midfielder

Team information
- Current team: Oryol (manager)

Youth career
- Dynamo Moscow

Senior career*
Years	Team	Apps	(Gls)
2000	Dynamo-2 Moscow	23	(2)
2000–2001	Dynamo Moscow	11	(1)
2002	Spartak Moscow	2	(0)
2003–2006	Krylia Sovetov Samara	32	(0)
2007–2010	Saturn Moscow Oblast	108	(6)
2011–2012	Rubin Kazan	25	(0)
2012–2014	Krylia Sovetov Samara	54	(2)
2014–2016	Tom Tomsk	36	(3)

International career
1998	Russia U-17	1	(0)
2001–2002	Russia U-19	8	(1)
2003	Russia U-21	1	(0)

Managerial career
- 2023–2025: Oryol (assistant)
- 2025–: Oryol
- * Club domestic league appearances and goals

Pyotr Aleksandrovich Nemov (Russian: Пётр Александрович Немов; born 18 October 1983) is a Russian football coach and a former midfielder who is the manager of Oryol.

== Club career ==
He made his Russian Premier League debut for FC Dynamo Moscow on 13 August 2000 in a game against FC Uralan Elista.

He was the youngest player to score a goal in the Russian Premier League for FC Dynamo Moscow (he scored on 19 May 2001 against FC Rotor Volgograd at the age of 17 years, 7 months and 1 day), until that mark was surpassed by Aleksandr Kokorin in 2008.
