= Denis Vavilin =

Russian footballer

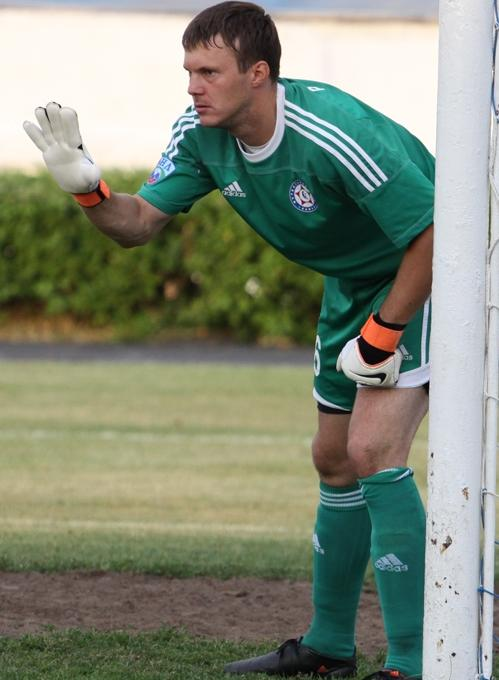

Personal information
- Full name: Denis Vladimirovich Vavilin
- Date of birth: 4 July 1982 (age 44)
- Place of birth: Kuybyshev, Russian SFSR
- Height: 1.90 m (6 ft 3 in)
- Position: Goalkeeper

Senior career*
Years	Team	Apps	(Gls)
2000	FC Krylia Sovetov-2 Samara	21	(0)
2001–2006	FC Krylia Sovetov Samara	1	(0)
2007–2009	FC Nosta Novotroitsk	73	(0)
2010–2011	FC KAMAZ Naberezhnye Chelny	52	(0)
2012–2015	FC Krylia Sovetov Samara	14	(0)
2015–2016	FC Volga Nizhny Novgorod	17	(0)
2016	FC Yenisey Krasnoyarsk	11	(0)
2017–2019	FC Tambov	46	(0)
2019–2020	FC Tom Tomsk	38	(0)
- * Club domestic league appearances and goals

Denis Vladimirovich Vavilin (Russian: Денис Владимирович Вавилин; born 4 July 1982) is a former Russian footballer.

== Club career ==
He made his Russian Premier League debut for FC Krylia Sovetov Samara on 13 October 2001 in a game against FC Spartak Moscow.
