= FC Tolyatti =

- Full name: Football Club Tolyatti
- Founded: 2008
- Dissolved: 2010
- Ground: Torpedo Stadium (Dimitrovgrad)
- Chairman: Yevgeni Pisarev
- Manager: Igor Osinkin
- League: Russian Second Division, Zone Ural-Povolzhye
- 2009: 12th

FC Tolyatti (Russian: ФК «Тольятти») was a Russian football club from Tolyatti, founded in 2008. Most of the players on the 2008 roster came from FC Krylia Sovetov-SOK Dimitrovgrad 2007 roster, and the club actually plays their home games in Dimitrovgrad. In March 2010, the club was excluded from the Second Division, (as was another Tolyatti team, FC Lada Tolyatti at the time). FC Lada Tolyatti is still functioning however, while Tolyatti is now also represented by FC Akademiya Tolyatti.

== See also ==
Konoplyov football academy
