= FC Akademiya Tolyatti =

Akademiya
- Full name: Football Club Akademiya Tolyatti
- Founded: 1991, 2015
- Dissolved: 2012, 2019
- Ground: Torpedo Stadium, Tolyatti
- Capacity: 18 000
- Chairman: Dmitri Gerasimov
- Manager: Yuri Elchev
- League: Russian Amateur Football League
Home colours	Away colours

Akademiya (Russian: "Академия") was a Russian association football club from Tolyatti, Russia. The club was founded in 1991 as a result of the merger between Energiya (Энергия) and Lada-Simbirsk (Лада-Симбирск). Before the 2010 season, two teams from Tolyatti, FC Togliatti and FC Lada Togliatti, were excluded from the professional leagues, with FC Akademiya representing Tolyatti at the time.

== History ==
It was founded in 1991 under the name "Lada". In 1997-1998 it was renamed "Lada-Grad", in 1999 — "Lada-Simbirsk". In 2000, the club was merged with the Energia Ulyanovsk team under the name Lada-Energia. In 2003–2007, it was called "Lada-SOK" and "Krylia Sovetov-SOK". After the 2007 season, the players and coaching staff moved to the newly formed FC Tolyatti, and in early 2010 there was a merger with FC Tolyatti, and the team finally moved to the Samara region. All football players of FC Akademiya were trained at the football center Konoplyov football academy.

Until 2010, the team represented Dimitrovgrad. In 2013, the club and the Konoplev Academy became part of the Samara "Krylia Sovetov Samara". In 2015, the club was merged with the youth team of FC Lada-Tolyatti, and given a new name "Academy-Lada-M". Since the 2015 season, the club has been playing in the third division of the MFS Privolzhye.

== Former names ==
- Lada Dimitrovgrad (Russian: Лада) (1991 – June 1997)
- Lada-Grad Dimitrovgrad (Russian: Лада-Град) (June 1997 – 1998)
- Lada-Simbirsk Dimitrovgrad (Russian: Лада-Симбирск) (1999)
- Lada-Energiya Dimitrovgrad (Russian: Лада-Энергия) (2000 – 2002)
- Lada-SOK Dimitrovgrad (Russian: Лада-СОК) (2003 – 2005)
- Krylia Sovetov-SOK Dimitrovgrad (Russian: Крылья Советов-СОК) (2006–2007)
- Akademiya Dimitrovgrad (Russian: Академия) (2008–2009)
- Akademiya Tolyatti (Russian: Академия) (2009–2013)
- Akademiya-Lada-M (Russian: Академия-Лада-М) (2015–2018)
- Akademiya (Russian: Академия) (2018–)

In early 2008, most of the players and coaches from the 2007 Krylya Sovetov-SOK roster moved to a new club, FC Togliatti. That club formally was from Tolyatti, but played in Dimitrovgrad on the same field as FC Akademiya.

== See also ==
- Konoplyov football academy
- FC Akron Tolyatti
- FC Krylia Sovetov Samara
- FC Lada Togliatti
- FC Togliatti
