= 2018–19 FC Krylia Sovetov Samara season =

PFC Krylia Sovetov Samara
2018–19 season
- Chairman: Vitaliy Shashkov
- Manager: Andrey Tikhonov (until 5 October); Miodrag Božović (from 5 October)
- Stadium: Samara Arena; Metallurg Stadion
- Premier League: 13th
- Relegation play-offs: Winners vs Nizhny Novgorod
- Russian Cup: Round of 16 vs Krasnodar
- Top goalscorer: League: Maksim Kanunnikov (5); All: Maksim Kanunnikov (5)
Home colours	Away colours

The 2018–19 PFC Krylia Sovetov Samara season was the club's first season back in the Russian Premier League, the highest tier of football in Russia, since their relegation at the end of the 2016–17 season.

== Season events ==
On 5 October 2018, manager Andrey Tikhonov was fired, with Miodrag Božović being anointed in his place on the same day.

== Squad ==
As of 28 February 2019

Note: Flags indicate national team as defined under FIFA eligibility rules; some limited exceptions apply. Players may hold more than one non-FIFA nationality.

No.	Pos.	Nation	Player
1	GK	RUS	Sergey Ryzhikov
2	DF	RUS	Vladimir Poluyakhtov
5	DF	SLO	Miral Samardžić
8	FW	BLR	Sergei Kornilenko
10	MF	GEO	Jano Ananidze (on loan from Spartak Moscow)
11	FW	AZE	Ramil Sheydayev
13	MF	GHA	Mohammed Rabiu
14	GK	RUS	Yevgeni Konyukhov
15	DF	RUS	Georgi Zotov
18	DF	URU	Agustín Rogel
19	MF	RUS	Aleksandr Samedov
22	FW	SRB	Vanja Vučićević

No.	Pos.	Nation	Player
28	MF	ROU	Paul Anton
31	MF	RUS	Denis Tkachuk
39	DF	UZB	Vitaliy Denisov (on loan from Lokomotiv Moscow)
40	MF	RUS	Artyom Timofeyev (on loan from Spartak Moscow)
44	DF	RUS	Nikita Chicherin
49	DF	RUS	Roman Shishkin (on loan from Krasnodar)
70	FW	RUS	Anton Zinkovskiy
90	DF	RUS	Taras Burlak
91	MF	RUS	Pavel Yakovlev
95	DF	RUS	Maksim Karpov
99	FW	RUS	Maksim Kanunnikov

=== Out on loan ===
Note: Flags indicate national team as defined under FIFA eligibility rules; some limited exceptions apply. Players may hold more than one non-FIFA nationality.

No.	Pos.	Nation	Player
—	GK	RUS	Vitali Shilnikov (at Syzran-2003 until 30 June 2019)
—	DF	RUS	Ali Gadzhibekov (at Yenisey Krasnoyarsk until 30 June 2019)
—	DF	RUS	Kirill Gotsuk (at Avangard Kursk until 30 June 2019)

No.	Pos.	Nation	Player
—	FW	RUS	Aleksandr Sobolev (at Yenisey Krasnoyarsk until 30 June 2019)
—	FW	RUS	Ilya Viznovich (at Luch Vladivostok until 30 June 2019)

== Transfers ==
=== Summer ===
In: Note: Flags indicate national team as defined under FIFA eligibility rules; some limited exceptions apply. Players may hold more than one non-FIFA nationality.

No.	Pos.	Nation	Player
1	GK	RUS	Sergey Ryzhikov (from (Russia) Rubin Kazan)
2	DF	RUS	Vladimir Poluyakhtov (from (Russia) Anzhi Makhachkala)
3	DF	RUS	Georgi Tigiyev (on loan from (Russia) Spartak Moscow)
5	DF	SLO	Miral Samardžić (from (Russia) Anzhi Makhachkala)
11	FW	AZE	Ramil Sheydayev (from (Turkey) Trabzonspor)
18	DF	URU	Agustín Rogel (from (Uruguay) Nacional)
22	FW	SRB	Vanja Vučićević (from (Serbia) Red Star Belgrade)
25	GK	RUS	Mikhail Oparin (from (Russia) Tosno)
28	MF	ROU	Paul Anton (from (Russia) Anzhi Makhachkala)
39	DF	UZB	Vitaliy Denisov (on loan from (Russia) Lokomotiv Moscow)
44	DF	RUS	Nikita Chicherin (from (Russia) Yenisey Krasnoyarsk)
45	FW	RUS	Vladimir Tyavin
46	MF	RUS	Bakhadur Sokolov (from (Russia) Krylia Sovetov-2 Samara)
47	MF	RUS	Aleksei Karasyov
48	MF	RUS	Maksim Mukhin
51	GK	RUS	Yegor Lyubakov (from (Russia) Krylia Sovetov-2 Samara)
52	MF	RUS	Danila Smirnov (from (Russia) Krylia Sovetov-2 Samara)
53	DF	RUS	Nikita Kotin
54	MF	RUS	Denis Kravchenko
55	MF	RUS	Aleksandr Bogomolov (from (Russia) Krylia Sovetov-2 Samara)
56	MF	RUS	Ilya Buryukin (from (Russia) Krylia Sovetov-2 Samara)
57	MF	RUS	Ilya Volnov (from (Russia) Krylia Sovetov-2 Samara)
58	DF	RUS	Vladislav Shchetinin
59	MF	RUS	Konstantin Shamayev (from (Russia) Krylia Sovetov-2 Samara)
60	DF	RUS	Aleksandr Nesterov (from (Russia) Krylia Sovetov-2 Samara)
61	MF	RUS	Aleksandr Bosov (from (Russia) Krylia Sovetov-2 Samara)
62	DF	RUS	Nikita Verkhunov (from (Russia) Krylia Sovetov-2 Samara)
63	DF	RUS	Pablo Davydov (from (Russia) Krylia Sovetov-2 Samara)
71	GK	RUS	Danil Beltyukov
89	MF	FRA	Yohan Mollo (from (Qatar) Al-Rayyan)
91	MF	RUS	Pavel Yakovlev (from (Russia) Anzhi Makhachkala)
94	MF	RUS	Viktor Gryazin
99	FW	RUS	Maksim Kanunnikov (from (Russia) SKA-Khabarovsk)
—	MF	RUS	Vyacheslav Zinkov (end of loan to (Russia) Zenit St. Petersburg)

Out: Note: Flags indicate national team as defined under FIFA eligibility rules; some limited exceptions apply. Players may hold more than one non-FIFA nationality.

No.	Pos.	Nation	Player
3	DF	RUS	Dmitri Yatchenko (to (Russia) Yenisey Krasnoyarsk)
4	DF	RUS	Ivan Taranov (to (Russia) Krasnodar)
5	DF	RUS	Ali Gadzhibekov (on loan to (Russia) Yenisey Krasnoyarsk)
10	MF	RUS	Azer Aliyev (released)
22	FW	RUS	Sergey Samodin (to (Russia) Shinnik Yaroslavl)
25	MF	RUS	Vladislav Kulik (to (Russia) Anzhi Makhachkala)
25	GK	RUS	Mikhail Oparin (to (Russia) SKA-Khabarovsk, previously from (Russia) Tosno)
27	MF	RUS	Danil Klyonkin (to (Russia) Tambov)
28	GK	RUS	Artyom Leonov (to (Russia) SKA-Khabarovsk)
77	GK	GEO	Giorgi Loria (released, previously on loan to (Russia) Anzhi Makhachkala)
77	MF	RUS	Svyatoslav Georgiyevsky
88	GK	RUS	Vitali Shilnikov (on loan to (Russia) Syzran-2003)
98	FW	RUS	Ilya Viznovich (on loan to (Russia) Luch Vladivostok)
—	GK	RUS	Bogdan Ovsyannikov (released, previously on loan to (Portugal) União de Leiria)
—	MF	RUS	Vyacheslav Zinkov (released, previously on loan to (Russia) Zenit Saint Petersburg)

=== Winter ===
In: Note: Flags indicate national team as defined under FIFA eligibility rules; some limited exceptions apply. Players may hold more than one non-FIFA nationality.

No.	Pos.	Nation	Player
10	MF	GEO	Jano Ananidze (on loan from (Russia) Spartak Moscow)
13	MF	GHA	Mohammed Rabiu (from (Russia) Anzhi Makhachkala)
19	MF	RUS	Aleksandr Samedov (from (Russia) Spartak Moscow)
40	MF	RUS	Artyom Timofeyev (on loan from (Russia) Spartak Moscow)
49	DF	RUS	Roman Shishkin (on loan from (Russia) Krasnodar)
70	MF	RUS	Anton Zinkovskiy (from (Russia) Chertanovo Moscow)
79	GK	RUS	Nikita Pishchulin
82	DF	RUS	Daniil Matveyev (from (Russia) Kolomna)
83	MF	RUS	Nikita Stroyev
84	FW	RUS	Pavel Zuyev (from (Russia) Dolgoprudny-2)
85	FW	RUS	Yegor Novikov (from (Russia) Krasnodar academy)
86	FW	RUS	Bogdan Chinarev
87	DF	RUS	Ilya Kotkin
95	DF	RUS	Maksim Karpov (from (Russia) Zenit St. Petersburg)

Out: Note: Flags indicate national team as defined under FIFA eligibility rules; some limited exceptions apply. Players may hold more than one non-FIFA nationality.

No.	Pos.	Nation	Player
3	DF	RUS	Georgi Tigiyev (end of loan from (Russia) Spartak Moscow)
4	MF	RUS	Yevgeni Bashkirov (to (Russia) Rubin Kazan)
6	DF	BRA	Nadson (to (Finland) SJK)
7	FW	RUS	Aleksandr Sobolev (on loan to (Russia) Yenisey Krasnoyarsk)
9	MF	RUS	Alan Chochiyev (to (Belarus) Dinamo Minsk)
20	MF	SRB	Srđan Mijailović
42	DF	RUS	Vsevolod Gruzdev
49	FW	RUS	Nikita Kireyev (to (Russia) Murom)
51	GK	RUS	Yegor Lyubakov (to (Russia) Murom)
54	MF	RUS	Denis Kravchenko
56	MF	RUS	Ilya Buryukin (to (Russia) Irtysh Omsk)
57	MF	RUS	Ilya Volnov
64	MF	RUS	Oleg Lanin (end of loan from (Russia) Krasnodar)
65	MF	RUS	Yevgeni Priymak
89	MF	FRA	Yohan Mollo (to (France) Sochaux)
—	DF	UKR	Dmytro Nyemchaninov (to (Ukraine) Desna Chernihiv, previously on loan to (Ukraine) Olimpik Donetsk)

== Competitions ==
=== Premier League ===
==== Results by round ====
Round	1	2	3	4	5	6	7	8	9	10	11	12	13	14	15	16	17	18	19	20	21	22	23	24	25	26	27	28	29	30
Ground	H	H	A	H	A	H	A	H	A	H	A	H	A	H	A	H	A	H	A	H	A	A	H	A	H	A	H	A	H	A
Result	D	L	W	L	L	W	L	L	L	W	D	L	W	L	L	W	D	W	W	L	L	L	W	L	L	L	D	L	L	L
Position	11	13	9	13	12	10	12	14	15	11	13	13	13	13	13	13	13	13	11	11	11	12	11	13	13	13	13	13	13	13

Updated to match(es) played on 26 May 2019. Source: See Results
A = Away; H = Home; W = Win; D = Draw; L = Loss

==== Results ====
31 July 2018 1	Krylia Sovetov	0 – 0	CSKA Moscow	Samara
20:00 SAMT (UTC+4)	Zotov (yellow card) 23'; Chicherin (yellow card) 76'	Report	Chernov (yellow card) 84'	Stadium: Samara Arena; Attendance: 39,137; Referee: Sergey Lapochkin

5 August 2018 2	Krylia Sovetov	0 – 3	Orenburg	Samara
17:30 SAMT (UTC+4)	Mijailović (penalty missed) 37'; Sobolev (yellow card) 90'	Report	Kozlov 26', 45+1' (yellow card) 36'; Breyev (yellow card) 34' (goal) 38'; Sutormin (yellow card) 62'; Chirkin (yellow card) 68'	Stadium: Samara Arena; Attendance: 22,930; Referee: Vladislav Bezborodov

11 August 2018 3	Rostov	0 – 1	Krylia Sovetov	Rostov-on-Don
22:30 SAMT (UTC+4)	Gațcan (yellow card) 49'	Report	Sobolev 45+2'	Stadium: Rostov Arena; Attendance: 30,986; Referee: Sergei Karasev

19 August 2018 4	Krylia Sovetov	0 – 1	Lokomotiv Moscow	Samara
17:30 SAMT (UTC+4)	Bashkirov (yellow card) 76'; Yakovlev (yellow card) 79'	Report	Krychowiak 37'; Ignatyev (yellow card) 72' (yellow-red card) 78'	Stadium: Samara Arena; Attendance: 31,652; Referee: Evgeny Turbin

27 August 2018 5	Yenisey Krasnoyarsk	1 – 0	Krylia Sovetov	Tyumen
18:30 SAMT (UTC+4)	Obradović (yellow card) 35'; Bodul (yellow card) 38'; Kostyukov 44'; Kutyin (yellow card) 85'; Yurchenko (yellow card) 88'	Report	Lanin (yellow card) 31' (yellow-red card) 34'	Stadium: Geolog Stadium; Attendance: 1,510; Referee: Mikhail Vilkov
Note: Match played at the Geolog Stadium in Tyumen, due renovation work at Yenisey Krasnoyarsk's Central Stadium in Krasnoyarsk.

1 September 2018 6	Krylia Sovetov Samara	1 – 0	Anzhi Makhachkala	Samara
15:00 SAMT (UTC+4)	Chicherin (yellow card) 26'; Kornilenko 83'	Report		Stadium: Samara Arena; Attendance: 19,519; Referee: Roman Galimov

15 September 2018 7	Arsenal Tula	4 – 0	Krylia Sovetov	Tula
19:00 MSK (UTC+3)	Tkachyov 21', 50'; Đorđević 73'; Bakayev 82'	Report	Mollo (yellow card) 78'	Stadium: Arsenal Stadium; Attendance: 10,130; Referee: Sergei Karasev

24 September 2018 8	Krylia Sovetov	0 – 3	Krasnodar	Samara
19:30 SAMT (UTC+4)	Rogel (yellow card) 30'; Mijailović (yellow card) 32'; Tkachuk (yellow card) 36'	Report	Gazinsky (yellow card) 10'; Spajić (yellow card) 24'; Ari 69', 71'; Suleymanov 81'	Stadium: Samara Arena; Attendance: 17,198; Referee: Aleksei Matyunin

1 October 2018 9	Rubin Kazan	2 – 1	Krylia Sovetov	Kazan
20:30 SAMT (UTC+4)	Podberyozkin 27'; Kambolov (yellow card) 65'; Azmoun 90+4'	Report	Samardžić (yellow card) 38'; Kanunnikov 49'	Stadium: Kazan Arena; Attendance: 6,374; Referee: Kirill Levnikov

6 October 2018 10	Krylya Sovetov	1 – 0	Dynamo Moscow	Samara
15:00 SAMT (UTC+4)	Kanunnikov (yellow card) 48'; Kornilenko 51'; Rogel (yellow card) 86'; Ryzhikov (yellow card) 90+1'	Report	Kozlov (yellow card) 9'; Joãozinho (yellow card) 48'; Cardoso (yellow card) 59'; Tetteh (yellow card) 73'; Yevgenyev (yellow card) 76'; Šunjić (yellow card) 90+1'	Stadium: Samara Arena; Attendance: 14,528; Referee: Vitaly Meshkov

20 October 2018 11	Ural Yekaterinburg	1 – 1	Krylya Sovetov	Yekaterinburg
15:00 SAMT (UTC+4)	Panyukov 29'; Yegorychev (yellow card) 42'; Yevseyev (yellow card) 77' (yellow-red card) 88'; Ilyin (yellow card) 83'; Haroyan (yellow card) 90+5'	Report	Denisov (yellow card) 34' (yellow-red card) 55'; Zotov (yellow card) 37'; Kanunnikov 51'; Ryzhikov (yellow card) 59'; Poluyakhtov (yellow card) 90+4'; Kornilenko (yellow card) 90+5'	Stadium: Central Stadium; Attendance: 13,248; Referee: Aleksey Sukhoy

29 October 2018 12	Krylya Sovetov	0 – 1	Zenit St.Petersburg	Samara
19:00 SAMT (UTC+4)	Rogel (yellow card) 8' (yellow-red card) 78'; Kornilenko (yellow card) 59'; Chicherin (yellow card) 63'	Report	Paredes 22'; Mammana (yellow card) 52'; Neto (yellow card) 60'	Stadium: Samara Arena; Attendance: 27,102; Referee: Nikolay Voloshin

5 November 2018 13	Ufa	1 – 2	Krylya Sovetov	Ufa
17:30 SAMT (UTC+4)	Sysuyev 67'; Salatić (yellow card) 85'	Report	Samardžić 18'; Anton (yellow card) 57'; Zotov (yellow card) 89'; Yakovlev 90+2'	Stadium: Neftyanik Stadium; Attendance: 4,056; Referee: Vladislav Bezborodov

10 November 2018 14	Krylya Sovetov	1 – 2	Akhmat Grozny	Samara
17:30 SAMT (UTC+4)	Kanunnikov 69'; Chicherin (yellow card) 76'; Samardžić (yellow card) 86'; Sobolev (yellow card) 90+2'	Report	Semyonov (yellow card) 9'; Ángel (yellow card) 11'; Mohammadi (yellow card) 59'; Ravanelli 64'; Pliyev (yellow card) 66'; Ivanov 64'	Stadium: Samara Arena; Attendance: 8,697; Referee: Roman Galimov

25 November 2018 15	Spartak Moscow	3 – 1	Krylya Sovetov	Moscow
15:00 SAMT (UTC+4)	Zé Luís (yellow card) 46'; Hanni 59'; Melgarejo 61'; Luiz Adriano (yellow card) 88' (goal) 90'	Report	Bashkirov (yellow card) 9'; Kornilenko 49'; Sheydayev (yellow card) 83'	Stadium: Otkritie Arena; Attendance: 25,092; Referee: Vladimir Moskalyov

1 December 2018 16	Orenburg	Postponed	Krylya Sovetov	Orenburg
17:30 SAMT (UTC+4)		Report		Stadium: Gazovik Stadium
Note: Match postponed due to the temperature dropping below -15 degrees.

8 December 2018 17	Krylya Sovetov	1 – 0	Rostov	Samara
13:30 SAMT (UTC+4)	Bashkirov (yellow card) 2'; Anton 11' (pen.); Kornilenko (yellow card) 26' (yellow-red card) 44'; Sheydayev (yellow card) 82'; Samardžić (yellow card) 86'	Report	Hadžikadunić (yellow card) 10'; Gațcan (yellow card) 74' (yellow-red card) 85'; Sigurðsson (red card) 82'; Ingason (yellow card) 90+4'	Stadium: Samara Arena; Attendance: 7,213; Referee: Sergei Karasev

2 March 2019 18	Lokomotiv Moscow	2 – 2	Krylya Sovetov	Moscow
17:30 SAMT (UTC+4)	An.Miranchuk 23', 65' (yellow card) 55'; Denisov (yellow card) 49' (yellow-red card) 73'; Kvirkvelia (yellow card) 55'; Guilherme (yellow card) 57'; Eder (yellow card) 77'; Al.Miranchuk (yellow card) 84'	Report	Ananidze 19'; Rogel (yellow card) 55' (yellow-red card) 56'; Sheydayev 69'	Stadium: RZD Arena; Attendance: 10,534; Referee: Vladislav Bezborodov

9 March 2019 19	Krylya Sovetov	4 – 0	Yenisey Krasnoyarsk	Samara
15:00 SAMT (UTC+4)	Poluyakhtov (yellow card) 14'; Anton 37' (pen.); Kanunnikov 60'; Kornilenko 62' (pen.); Sheydayev 81'	Report	Ogude (yellow card) 34'; Torbinski (yellow card) 56'; Sarr (yellow card) 62'; Khubulov (yellow card) 87'	Stadium: Samara Arena; Attendance: 9,376; Referee: Sergey Lapochkin

15 March 2019 20	Anzhi Makhachkala	0 – 2	Krylya Sovetov	Kaspiysk
20:30 SAMT (UTC+4)	Zakirov (yellow card) 33'; Ivanchenko (yellow card) 79' (yellow-red card) 90+3'; Gapon (yellow card) 87'	Report	Kanunnikov 28'; Shishkin (yellow card) 40'; Poluyakhtov (yellow card) 43'; Burlak (yellow card) 66'; Samardžić (yellow card) 76'; Rabiu (yellow card) 85'; Sheydayev 88' (pen.)	Stadium: Anzhi Arena; Attendance: 3,120; Referee: Kirill Levnikov

29 March 2019 21	Krylya Sovetov	0 – 1	Arsenal Tula	Samara
19:30 SAMT (UTC+4)	Kornilenko (yellow card) 27'; Burlak (yellow card) 54'; Shishkin (yellow card) 80'; Samedov (yellow card) 82'	Report	Đorđević (yellow card) 2' (goal) 66'; Khagush (yellow card) 9'; Kombarov (yellow card) 17'; Tkachyov (yellow card) 54'; Gorbatenko (yellow card) 79'; Nigmatullin (yellow card) 89'	Stadium: Samara Arena; Attendance: 12,297; Referee: Aleksei Matyunin

3 April 2019 16	Orenburg	3 – 1	Krylya Sovetov	Orenburg
18:00 SAMT (UTC+4)	Sutormin 8' (pen.); Oyewole (yellow card) 11'; Begić 17'; Sivakow 54'; Popović (yellow card) 70'; Miškić (yellow card) 90+1'	Report	Sheydayev 12' (pen.); Zotov (yellow card) 19'; Burlak (yellow card) 53'; Anton (yellow card) 73'	Stadium: Gazovik Stadium; Attendance: 3,684; Referee: Pavel Kukuyan
Note: Match originally scheduled for 1 December 2018, bu postponed due to the temperature dropping below -15 degrees.

6 April 2019 22	Krasnodar	1 – 0	Krylia Sovetov	Krasnodar
17:30 SAMT (UTC+4)	Martynovich (yellow card) 52'; Petrov (yellow card) 63' (red card) 71'; Claesson 90+2' (pen.)	Report	Timofeyev (yellow card) 5'; Samardžić (yellow card) 30'; Poluyakhtov (yellow card) 63'; Burlak (yellow card) 90+1'	Stadium: Krasnodar Stadium; Attendance: 22,885; Referee: Aleksei Eskov

12 April 2019 23	Krylia Sovetov	1 – 0	Rubin Kazan	Samara
19:30 SAMT (UTC+4)	Zinkovsky 56'; Shishkin (yellow card) 57'; Samardžić (yellow card) 64'; Kanunnikov (yellow card) 73'	Report	Stepanov (yellow card) 28'; Uremović (yellow card) 74'	Stadium: Samara Arena; Attendance: 13,761; Referee: Vasiliy Kazartsev

20 April 2019 24	Dynamo Moscow	1 – 0	Krylia Sovetov	Khimki
17:30 SAMT (UTC+4)	Yusupov (yellow card) 17'; Tetteh (yellow card) 21'; Panchenko 67' (yellow card) 90'	Report	Rabiu (yellow card) 35'	Stadium: Arena Khimki; Attendance: 5,352; Referee: Sergey Lapochkin

25 April 2019 25	Krylia Sovetov	0 – 1	Ural Yekaterinburg	Samara
19:30 SAMT (UTC+4)	Vučićević (yellow card) 42'; Samardžić (yellow card) 53'; Ananidze (yellow card) 76'	Report	Boumal (yellow card) 8'; El Kabir 61' (pen.); Hodzyur (yellow card) 87'; Yemelyanov (yellow card) 90+5'	Stadium: Samara Arena; Referee: Aleksei Matyunin

28 April 2019 26	Zenit St.Petersburg	4 – 2	Krylia Sovetov	Saint Petersburg
17:30 SAMT (UTC+4)	Azmoun 9', 30'; Driussi (yellow card) 14'; Burlak 35' (o.g.); Ozdoyev (yellow card) 47'; Rigoni (yellow card) 54'; Zhirkov (yellow card) 88'; Smolnikov 90+1'	Report	Tkachuk 40', 44'; Sheydayev (yellow card) 47' (yellow-red card) 78'; Rabiu (yellow card) 49'	Stadium: Krestovsky Stadium; Attendance: 40,463; Referee: Aleksei Eskov

5 May 2019 27	Krylia Sovetov	1 – 1	Ufa	Samara
15:00 SAMT (UTC+4)	Timofeyev 12' (yellow card) 20'; Samardžić (yellow card) 81'	Report	Nedelcearu (yellow card) 41' (goal) 90+3'	Stadium: Samara Arena; Attendance: 15,836; Referee: Vitaly Meshkov

11 May 2019 28	Akhmat Grozny	2 – 1	Krylia Sovetov	Grozny
17:30 SAMT (UTC+4)	Mbengue 3', 42'; Shvets (yellow card) 55'; Ivanov (yellow card) 90+3'	Report	Burlak 44' (yellow card) 90+2'; Rogel (yellow card) 55'; Tkachuk (yellow card) 77'; Rabiu (yellow card) 84'	Stadium: Akhmat-Arena; Referee: Mikhail Vilkov

18 May 2019 29	Krylia Sovetov	1 – 2	Spartak Moscow	Samara
20:00 SAMT (UTC+4)	Denisov (yellow card) 38'; Ryzhikov (yellow card) 43'; Burlak 83'	Report	Zé Luís 18' (pen.); Luiz Adriano (yellow card) 39'; Melgarejo (yellow card) 45' (goal) 50'; Gaponov (yellow card) 47'; Zobnin (yellow card) 48'; Fernando (yellow card) 88'; Guliyev (yellow card) 90+6'	Stadium: Samara Arena; Attendance: 37,276; Referee: Vasiliy Kazartsev

26 May 2019 30	CSKA Moscow	6 – 0	Krylia Sovetov	Moscow
15:00 SAMT (UTC+4)	Chalov 4', 73'; Magnússon 48'; Bijol 52'; Sigurðsson 56'; Oblyakov 80'	Report		Stadium: VEB Arena; Attendance: 22,053; Referee: Vitali Meshkov

==== League table ====
Pos	Team	Pld	W	D	L	GF	GA	GD	Pts	Qualification or relegation
11	Rubin Kazan	30	7	15	8	24	30	−6	36	
12	Dynamo Moscow	30	6	15	9	28	28	0	33	
13	Krylia Sovetov Samara (O)	30	8	4	18	25	46	−21	28	Qualification for the Relegation play-offs
14	Ufa (O)	30	5	11	14	24	34	−10	26	Qualification for the Relegation play-offs
15	Anzhi Makhachkala (R)	30	5	6	19	13	50	−37	21	Relegation to Football National League

Updated to match(es) played on 26 May 2019. Source: Russian Premier League, Soccerway
Rules for classification: 1) Points; 2) Head-to-head points; 3) Head-to-head matches won; 4) Head-to-head goal difference; 5) Head-to-head goals scored; 6) Head-to-head away goals; 7) Matches won; 8) Goal difference; 9) Goals scored; 10) Away goals scored; 11) Play-off.
(O) Play-off winner; (R) Relegated

==== Relegation play-offs ====
30 May 2019 1st Leg	Nizhny Novgorod	1 – 3	Krylia Sovetov	Nizhny Novgorod
20:00 SAMT (UTC+4)	Fomin 23' (pen.); Fedoriv (yellow card) 26'; Goglichidze (yellow card) 90'	Report	Timofeyev (yellow card) 21'; Fedoriv 65' (o.g.); Rabiu (yellow card) 67'; Anton (yellow card) 71'; Zinkovsky 90+1' (pen.); Shishkin 90+4'	Stadium: Nizhny Novgorod Stadium; Attendance: 21,800; Referee: Sergey Lapochkin

2 June 2019 2nd Leg	Krylia Sovetov	0 – 1 (3 – 2 agg.)	Nizhny Novgorod	Samara
18:00 SAMT (UTC+4)	Denisov (yellow card) 30'; Anton (penalty missed) 55'	Report	Paliyenko (yellow card) 5'; Fomin 45' (pen.); Khripkov (yellow card) 56'; Sapeta (yellow card) 70'; Goglichidze (yellow card) 88'	Stadium: Samara Arena; Attendance: 23,441; Referee: Sergei Karasev

=== Russian Cup ===
27 September 2018 Round of 32	Tambov	1 – 2 (a.e.t.)	Krylia Sovetov	Tambov
20:30 SAMT (UTC+4)	Kilin (yellow card) 31'; Klyonkin 37'; Ovsiyenko (yellow card) 90'; Gorbatyuk (yellow card) 116'	Report	Mijailović (yellow card) 29'; Chicherin 72'; Bashkirov (yellow card) 92'; Anton 95'; Kornilenko (yellow card) 96'; Kanunnikov (yellow card) 120'	Stadium: Spartak Stadium; Attendance: 4,600; Referee: Nikolay Voloshin

1 November 2018 Round of 16	Krylia Sovetov	1 – 2 (a.e.t.)	Krasnodar	Samara
19:00 SAMT (UTC+4)	Sobolev (yellow card) 40' (goal) 54'; Mijailović (yellow card) 44'	Report	Stotsky (yellow card) 47'; Spajić (yellow card) 68'; Claesson 76'; Ignatyev 111'	Stadium: Samara Arena; Attendance: 11,093; Referee: Vasily Kazartsev

== Squad statistics ==
As of match played 2 June 2019

=== Appearances and goals ===
No.	Pos	Nat	Player	Total		Premier League		Russian Cup		Relegation Playoff	
No.	Pos	Nat	Player	Apps	Goals	Apps	Goals	Apps	Goals	Apps	Goals
1	GK	(Russia) RUS	Sergey Ryzhikov	26	0	23	0	1	0	2	0
2	DF	(Russia) RUS	Vladimir Poluyakhtov	17	0	11+3	0	1	0	0+2	0
3	DF	(Russia) RUS	Georgi Tigiyev	4	0	1+1	0	2	0	0	0
5	DF	(Slovenia) SLO	Miral Samardžić	25	1	21+1	1	1	0	2	0
7	FW	(Russia) RUS	Aleksandr Sobolev	13	2	5+7	1	1	1	0	0
8	FW	(Belarus) BLR	Sergei Kornilenko	23	4	12+9	4	1+1	0	0	0
10	MF	(Georgia (country)) GEO	Jano Ananidze	8	1	8	1	0	0	0	0
11	FW	(Azerbaijan) AZE	Ramil Sheydayev	20	4	10+8	4	0	0	2	0
13	MF	(Ghana) GHA	Mohammed Rabiu	11	0	8+1	0	0	0	2	0
14	GK	(Russia) RUS	Yevgeni Konyukhov	8	0	7	0	1	0	0	0
15	DF	(Russia) RUS	Georgi Zotov	28	0	20+6	0	0	0	0+2	0
17	DF	(Russia) RUS	Mikhail Tikhonov	1	0	0+1	0	0	0	0	0
18	DF	(Uruguay) URU	Agustín Rogel	18	0	14	0	2	0	2	0
19	MF	(Russia) RUS	Aleksandr Samedov	9	0	8+1	0	0	0	0	0
20	MF	(Serbia) SRB	Srđan Mijailović	8	0	5+1	0	2	0	0	0
22	FW	(Serbia) SRB	Vanja Vučićević	3	0	1+2	0	0	0	0	0
28	MF	(Romania) ROU	Paul Anton	27	3	15+8	2	1+1	1	2	0
31	MF	(Russia) RUS	Denis Tkachuk	25	2	15+6	2	0+2	0	2	0
39	DF	(Uzbekistan) UZB	Vitaliy Denisov	18	0	15	0	1	0	2	0
40	MF	(Russia) RUS	Artyom Timofeyev	12	1	9+1	1	0	0	2	0
44	DF	(Russia) RUS	Nikita Chicherin	18	1	15+2	0	0+1	1	0	0
49	DF	(Russia) RUS	Roman Shishkin	14	1	12	0	0	0	2	1
70	MF	(Russia) RUS	Anton Zinkovsky	15	2	9+4	1	0	0	2	1
78	DF	(Russia) RUS	Gennadi Kiselyov	1	0	0+1	0	0	0	0	0
90	DF	(Russia) RUS	Taras Burlak	23	2	22+1	2	0	0	0	0
91	MF	(Russia) RUS	Pavel Yakovlev	20	1	8+9	1	1	0	0+2	0
99	FW	(Russia) RUS	Maksim Kanunnikov	22	5	19+1	5	2	0	0	0
Players away from the club on loan:
Players who left Krylia Sovetov during the season:
4	MF	(Russia) RUS	Yevgeni Bashkirov	17	0	11+4	0	2	0	0	0
6	DF	(Brazil) BRA	Nadson	8	0	7	0	1	0	0	0
9	FW	(Russia) RUS	Alan Chochiyev	11	0	9	0	1+1	0	0	0
10	MF	(Russia) RUS	Azer Aliyev	1	0	0+1	0	0	0	0	0
64	MF	(Russia) RUS	Oleg Lanin	9	0	6+2	0	1	0	0	0
89	MF	(France) FRA	Yohan Mollo	7	0	4+3	0	0	0	0	0

=== Goal scorers ===
Place	Position	Nation	Number	Name	Premier League	Russian Cup	Relegation Playoff	Total
1	FW	(Russia)	99	Maksim Kanunnikov	5	0	0	5
2	FW	(Belarus)	8	Sergei Kornilenko	4	0	0	4
2	FW	(Azerbaijan)	11	Ramil Sheydayev	4	0	0	4
4	MF	(Romania)	28	Paul Anton	2	1	0	3
5	MF	(Russia)	31	Denis Tkachuk	2	0	0	2
5	DF	(Russia)	90	Taras Burlak	2	0	0	2
5	FW	(Russia)	7	Aleksandr Sobolev	1	1	0	2
5	MF	(Russia)	70	Anton Zinkovsky	1	0	1	2
9	DF	(Slovenia)	5	Miral Samardžić	1	0	0	1
9	MF	(Russia)	91	Pavel Yakovlev	1	0	0	1
9	MF	(Georgia (country))	10	Jano Ananidze	1	0	0	1
9	MF	(Russia)	40	Artyom Timofeyev	1	0	0	1
9	DF	(Russia)	44	Nikita Chicherin	0	1	0	1
9	DF	(Russia)	49	Roman Shishkin	0	0	1	1
9				Own goal	0	0	1	1
				TOTALS	23	3	3	29

=== Disciplinary record ===
Number	Nation	Position	Name	Premier League		Russian Cup		Relegation Playoff		Total	
Number	Nation	Position	Name	Yellow card	Red card	Yellow card	Red card	Yellow card	Red card	Yellow card	Red card
1	(Russia)	DF	Sergey Ryzhikov	3	0	0	0	0	0	3	0
2	(Russia)	DF	Vladimir Poluyakhtov	4	0	0	0	0	0	4	0
5	(Slovenia)	DF	Miral Samardžić	8	0	0	0	0	0	8	0
7	(Russia)	FW	Aleksandr Sobolev	2	0	1	0	0	0	3	0
8	(Belarus)	FW	Sergei Kornilenko	6	1	1	0	0	0	7	1
10	(Georgia (country))	MF	Jano Ananidze	1	0	0	0	0	0	1	0
11	(Azerbaijan)	FW	Ramil Sheydayev	4	1	0	0	0	0	4	1
13	(Ghana)	MF	Mohammed Rabiu	4	0	0	0	1	0	5	0
15	(Russia)	DF	Georgi Zotov	4	0	0	0	0	0	4	0
18	(Uruguay)	DF	Agustín Rogel	7	2	0	0	0	0	7	2
19	(Russia)	MF	Aleksandr Samedov	1	0	0	0	0	0	1	0
20	(Serbia)	MF	Srđan Mijailović	1	0	2	0	0	0	3	0
22	(Serbia)	FW	Vanja Vučićević	1	0	0	0	0	0	1	0
28	(Romania)	MF	Paul Anton	2	0	0	0	1	0	3	0
31	(Russia)	MF	Denis Tkachuk	2	0	0	0	0	0	2	0
39	(Uzbekistan)	DF	Vitaliy Denisov	3	1	0	0	1	0	4	1
40	(Russia)	MF	Artyom Timofeyev	2	0	0	0	1	0	3	0
44	(Russia)	DF	Nikita Chicherin	4	0	0	0	0	0	4	0
49	(Russia)	DF	Roman Shishkin	3	0	0	0	0	0	3	0
90	(Russia)	DF	Taras Burlak	5	0	0	0	0	0	5	0
91	(Russia)	MF	Pavel Yakovlev	1	0	0	0	0	0	1	0
99	(Russia)	FW	Maksim Kanunnikov	2	0	1	0	0	0	3	0
Players who left Krylia Sovetov during the season:
4	(Russia)	MF	Yevgeni Bashkirov	3	0	1	0	0	0	4	0
64	(Russia)	MF	Oleg Lanin	2	1	0	0	0	0	2	1
89	(France)	MF	Yohan Mollo	1	0	0	0	0	0	1	0
			TOTALS	76	6	6	0	4	0	86	6
