= 2019–20 PFC Krylia Sovetov Samara season =

PFC Krylia Sovetov Samara
2019–20 season
- Chairman: Vitaliy Shashkov
- Manager: Miodrag Božović (until 28 June); Andrei Talalayev (from 28 June)
- Stadium: Samara Arena
- Premier League: 15th
- Russian Cup: Round of 32 vs Torpedo Moscow
- Top goalscorer: League: Aleksandr Sobolev (10); All: Aleksandr Sobolev (10)
Home colours	Away colours

The 2019–20 PFC Krylia Sovetov Samara season was the club's second season back in the Russian Premier League, the highest tier of football in Russia, since their relegation at the end of the 2016–17 season.

== Season events ==
On 17 March, the Russian Premier League postponed all league fixtures until April 10 due to the COVID-19 pandemic.

On 1 April, the Russian Football Union extended the suspension of football until 31 May.

On 15 May, the Russian Football Union announced that the Russian Premier League season would resume on 21 June.

On 18 May, Spartak Moscow announced that they had exercised their option to purchase Aleksandr Sobolev from Krylia Sovetov.

On 28 June, manager Miodrag Božović left the club by mutual consent, with Andrei Talalayev being announced as his replacement later the same day.

On 16 July, the Russian Premier League announced that the final game of the season between Krylia Sovetov and Sochi would not take place due to an outbreak of COVID-19 within the Sochi squad. On 23 July, the RFU assigned Krylia Sovetov a 3–0 victory over Sochi in their cancelled game.

== Squad ==
As of 1 July 2020

Note: Flags indicate national team as defined under FIFA eligibility rules; some limited exceptions apply. Players may hold more than one non-FIFA nationality.

No.	Pos.	Nation	Player
1	GK	RUS	Sergey Ryzhikov
2	DF	RUS	Vladimir Poluyakhtov
3	DF	RUS	Nikita Chernov
5	DF	RUS	Vitali Lystsov
6	DF	RUS	Denis Yakuba
7	MF	IRQ	Safaa Hadi
8	MF	MDA	Alexandru Gațcan
9	FW	CRO	Dejan Radonjić
10	MF	RUS	Anton Terekhov
11	MF	SLO	Denis Popović
15	MF	RUS	Maksim Glushenkov (on loan from Spartak Moscow)
17	FW	RUS	Anton Zinkovskiy
18	DF	ALG	Mehdi Zeffane
20	MF	SRB	Srđan Mijailović
23	DF	RUS	Dmitri Kombarov

No.	Pos.	Nation	Player
28	MF	ROU	Paul Anton
30	MF	RUS	Sergei Ivanov (on loan from Zenit St.Petersburg)
33	GK	RUS	Yevgeni Konyukhov
39	GK	RUS	Yevgeny Frolov
40	MF	RUS	Artyom Timofeyev (on loan from Spartak Moscow)
44	DF	RUS	Nikita Chicherin
50	DF	RUS	Maksim Karpov
52	MF	RUS	Danila Smirnov
69	FW	RUS	Yegor Golenkov
77	MF	RUS	Dmitri Kabutov
78	MF	RUS	Gennadi Kiselyov
81	GK	RUS	Bogdan Ovsyannikov
90	DF	RUS	Taras Burlak
91	MF	RUS	Pavel Yakovlev
99	FW	RUS	Maksim Kanunnikov

=== Out on loan ===
Note: Flags indicate national team as defined under FIFA eligibility rules; some limited exceptions apply. Players may hold more than one non-FIFA nationality.

No. / Pos. / Nation / Player; 14 / MF / MDA / Radu Gînsari (at Ironi Kiryat Shmona)	No. / Pos. / Nation / Player; — / DF / RUS / Georgi Zotov (at Orenburg)

== Transfers ==
=== In ===
Date	Position	Nationality	Name	From	Fee	Ref.
Summer 2019	DF	(Russia)	Dmitri Kombarov	Spartak Moscow	Undisclosed	
Summer 2019	MF	(Moldova)	Radu Gînsari	Hapoel Haifa	Undisclosed	
Summer 2019	MF	(Russia)	Anton Terekhov	Dynamo Moscow	Undisclosed	
Summer 2019	MF	(Russia)	Denis Yakuba	Rotor Volgograd	Free	
Summer 2019	FW	(Croatia)	Dejan Radonjić	Lokomotiva	Undisclosed	
Summer 2019	FW	(Russia)	Dmitri Kabutov	SKA-Khabarovsk	Free	
23 July 2019	MF	(Moldova)	Alexandru Gațcan	Rostov	Free	
30 July 2019	DF	(Russia)	Nikita Chernov	CSKA Moscow	Undisclosed	
2 September 2019	DF	(Russia)	Vitali Lystsov	Benfica B	Undisclosed	
30 January 2020	DF	(Algeria)	Mehdi Zeffane		Free	
2 February 2020	GK	(Russia)	Yevgeny Frolov	Sochi	Undisclosed	
2 February 2020	MF	(Slovenia)	Denis Popović	Zürich	Undisclosed	
21 February 2020	MF	(Belarus)	Vladimir Medved	Rostov	Free	
21 February 2020	MF	(Iraq)	Safaa Hadi	Al-Shorta	Undisclosed	

=== Loans in ===
Date from	Position	Nationality	Name	From	Date to	Ref.
27 June 2019	MF	(Russia)	Artyom Timofeyev	Spartak Moscow	End of Season	
13 July 2019	DF	(Russia)	Aleksandr Anyukov	Zenit St.Petersburg	28 May 2020	
6 February 2020	MF	(Russia)	Sergei Ivanov	Zenit St.Petersburg	End of Season	
21 February 2020	MF	(Russia)	Maksim Glushenkov	Spartak Moscow	End of Season	

=== Out ===
Date	Position	Nationality	Name	To	Fee	Ref.
Summer 2019	MF	(Russia)	Viktor Gryazin	Sochi	Undisclosed	
17 June 2019	FW	(Serbia)	Vanja Vučićević	Lokomotiva	Undisclosed	
4 July 2019	FW	(Russia)	Ilya Viznovich	Shinnik Yaroslavl	Undisclosed	
11 July 2019	DF	(Slovenia)	Miral Samardžić	Olimpija Ljubljana	Undisclosed	
19 July 2019	DF	(Uruguay)	Agustín Rogel	Toulouse	Undisclosed	
11 January 2020	DF	(Russia)	Kirill Gotsuk	Nizhny Novgorod	Undisclosed	
31 January 2020	DF	(Russia)	Nikita Kotin	CSKA Moscow	Undisclosed	
1 July 2020	FW	(Russia)	Aleksandr Sobolev	Spartak Moscow	Undisclosed	

=== Loans out ===
Date from	Position	Nationality	Name	To	Date to	Ref.
Summer 2019	DF	(Russia)	Kirill Gotsuk	Avangard Kursk	27 December 2019	
26 July 2019	DF	(Russia)	Georgi Zotov	Orenburg	End of Season	
30 January 2020	FW	(Russia)	Aleksandr Sobolev	Spartak Moscow	End of Season	
4 February 2020	MF	(Russia)	Gennadi Kiselyov	Rotor Volgograd	End of Season	
6 February 2020	MF	(Moldova)	Radu Gînsari	Ironi Kiryat Shmona	End of Season	
7 February 2020	MF	(Russia)	Denis Yakuba	Chertanovo Moscow	End of Season	

=== Released ===
Date	Position	Nationality	Name	Joined	Date
Summer 2019	MF	(Russia)	Aleksandr Samedov	Retired	
Summer 2019	MF	(Russia)	Denis Tkachuk	Rotor Volgograd	19 August 2019
Summer 2019	FW	(Azerbaijan)	Ramil Sheydayev	Dynamo Moscow	2 July 2019
7 July 2019	MF	(Ghana)	Mohammed Rabiu	Paris FC	21 August 2019
10 July 2019	FW	(Belarus)	Sergei Kornilenko	Retired	

=== Trial ===
Date From	Date To	Position	Nationality	Name	Last club	Ref.
January 2020		FW	(Greece)	Stefanos Athanasiadis	PAS Giannina	

== Friendlies ==
21 January 2020	Krylia Sovetov (Russia)	4 – 1	(Latvia) Spartaks Jūrmala	Antalya, Turkey
18:00 SAMT (UTC+4)	Radonjić 13'; Golenkov 48'; Molchanov 63'; Anyukov 86'	Report	Ovsyannikov 29' (o.g.)	Stadium: Papillon Sports Centre

25 January 2020	Krylia Sovetov (Russia)	4 – 3	(Czech Republic) Bohemians 1905	Antalya, Turkey
18:00 SAMT (UTC+4)	Zinkovsky 2'; Anton 9'; Poluyakhtov 45'; Gînsari 80'	Report	Pulkrab 58'; V.Novak 67'; Nečas 76'	Stadium: Papillon Sports Centre

2 February 2020	Krylia Sovetov	2 – 2	Chayka Peschanokopskoye	Antalya, Turkey
13:00 SAMT (UTC+4)	Golenkov 13'; Gînsari 27' (pen.)	Report	Kulik 3'; Vasilyev 85'

2 February 2020	Krylia Sovetov (Russia)	1 – 1	(Belarus) Dynamo Brest	Antalya, Turkey
18:00 SAMT (UTC+4)	Radonjić 86'	Report	Milevskyi 4'

8 February 2020	Krylia Sovetov	2 – 1	Neftekhimik Nizhnekamsk	Antalya, Turkey
13:00 SAMT (UTC+4)	Anyukov (red card) 16'; Timofeyev (red card) 24'; Golenkov 37'; Chernov 84'	Report	Uridia 3'

8 February 2020	Krylia Sovetov (Russia)	2 – 2	(Denmark) Randers	Antalya, Turkey
18:30 SAMT (UTC+4)	Popović 64'; Terekhov 71'	Report	Jakobsen 5'; Egho 82' (pen.)

15 February 2020 FNL Cup	Krylia Sovetov	1 – 0	Chertanovo Moscow	Geroskipou, Cyprus
20:15 SAMT (UTC+4)	Mikhaylov 4' (o.g.); S.Shesternov (yellow card) 43'	Report	Kamyshev (yellow card) 28'	Stadium: Geroskipou Municipality Stadium

16 February 2020	Krylia Sovetov	0 – 1	Krasnodar	Marbella, Spain
14:30 SAMT (UTC+4)		Report	Borodin (yellow card) 55'; Vorotnikov 57'

16 February 2020	Krylia Sovetov (Russia)	7 – 0	(China) Dalian Professional	Marbella, Spain
19:30 SAMT (UTC+4)	Radonjić 20', 57', 72'; Anton 55'; Zinkovsky 70', 75'; Mijailović 80'	Report

18 February 2020 FNL Cup	Krylia Sovetov	3 – 3	Tom Tomsk	Geroskipou, Cyprus
14:45 SAMT (UTC+4)	S.Sherstnev 5'; A.Voichenko 10'; A.Bosov 18'; N.Trubin (yellow card) 60'	Report	Viznovich 12', 37'; Pletnyov (yellow card) 24'; Shurygin (yellow card) 26'; Kazankov (yellow card) 56'; Dolgov 87'; Lisinkov (yellow card) 88'	Stadium: Geroskipou Municipality Stadium

21 February 2020 FNL Cup	Krylia Sovetov	1 – 4	Tambov	Geroskipou, Cyprus
SAMT (UTC+4)	Medved 83'	Report	Oyewole (yellow card) 3'; Obukhov 8'; Kostyukov 30'; Gritsayenko 49'; Fedchuk 49'; Shlyakov (yellow card) 71'	Stadium: Geroskipou Municipality Stadium

22 February 2020	Krylia Sovetov (Russia)	0 – 2	(Norway) Strømsgodset	Marbella, Spain
15:00 SAMT (UTC+4)		Report	Salvesen 64'; Mawa 75'

22 February 2020	Krylia Sovetov	2 – 0	Torpedo Moscow	Marbella, Spain
19:00 SAMT (UTC+4)	Radonjić 54'; Mijailović 76'	Report

24 February 2020 FNL Cup	Krylia Sovetov	1 – 1 (a.e.t.) (7 – 8 p)	SKA Rostov	Geroskipou, Cyprus
14:45 SAMT (UTC+4)	K.Lomakin 49' (yellow card) 55'; N.Salikov (yellow card) 73'; A.Gorbunov (yellow card) 88'	Report	Ashev (yellow card) 20'; Shapovalov (yellow card) 61'; Dvornikov 66'	Stadium: Geroskipou Municipality Stadium
	Penalties
	Chicherin (penalty scored); K.Lomakin (penalty scored); S.Sherstnev (penalty scored); A.Gorbunov (penalty missed); A.Bulgakov (penalty scored); A.Nesterov (penalty scored); R.Ermakov (penalty scored); N.Salikov (penalty scored); D.Smetskiy (penalty scored); P.Davydov (penalty missed)		(penalty scored) D.Ivankov; (penalty scored) Kondryukov; (penalty missed) Dvornikov; (penalty scored) Gridnev; (penalty scored) Bendz; (penalty scored) Akhriyev; (penalty scored) Vinnichenko; (penalty scored) Sobol; (penalty scored) I.Kostylev; (penalty scored) I.Skripnik

26 February 2020 FNL Cup	Krylia Sovetov	1 – 0	Yenisey Krasnoyarsk	Geroskipou, Cyprus
17:35 SAMT (UTC+4)	Mildzikhov (yellow card) 90'	Report	Smirnov (yellow card) 55'; A.Voichenko 70'	Stadium: Geroskipou Municipality Stadium

== Competitions ==
=== Premier League ===
==== Results by round ====
Round	1	2	3	4	5	6	7	8	9	10	11	12	13	14	15	16	17	18	19	20	21	22	23	24	25	26	27	28	29	30
Ground	H	H	A	H	A	A	H	H	A	A	H	A	A	H	H	A	A	H	H	H	A	A	H	A	A	H	A	A	H	H
Result	W	L	L	L	L	W	L	D	L	D	W	W	W	L	D	L	L	L	L	D	W	L	L	L	D	D	W	L	D	W
Position	1	8	14	13	14	12	13	13	14	15	12	10	6	8	7	12	12	15	15	15	12	15	16	16	15	15	15	15	15	15

Updated to match(es) played on 23 July 2020. Source: See Results
A = Away; H = Home; W = Win; D = Draw; L = Loss

==== Results ====
14 July 2019 1	Krylia Sovetov	2 – 0	CSKA Moscow	Samara
17:30 SAMT (UTC+4)	Kombarov (yellow card) 38'; Sobolev 51', 58' (pen.)	Report	Vasin (yellow card) 31'; Šarlija (yellow card) 46'; Chalov (yellow card) 78'	Stadium: Samara Arena; Attendance: 25,287; Referee: Kirill Levnikov

20 July 2019 2	Krylia Sovetov	2 – 3	Arsenal Tula	Samara
17:30 SAMT (UTC+4)	Sobolev 43' (yellow card) 90+6'; Burlak 56'; Mijailović (yellow card) 59'; Kabutov (yellow card) 72'	Report	Tkachyov 22' (yellow card) 90+5'; Kangwa 24' (yellow card) 55'; Tudorie 52'; Lutsenko (yellow card) 82'; Álvarez (yellow card) 90+1'; Grigalava (yellow card) 90+6'	Stadium: Samara Arena; Attendance: 15,780; Referee: Pavel Kukuyan

27 July 2019 3	Ufa	2 – 1	Krylia Sovetov	Ufa
15:00 SAMT (UTC+4)	Fomin 21'; Poluyakhtov 33' (o.g.); Putsko (yellow card) 51'	Report	Mijailović 25'; Poluyakhtov (yellow card) 57'; Sobolev (yellow card) 60'	Stadium: Neftyanik Stadium; Attendance: 6,543; Referee: Vasiliy Kazartsev

3 August 2019 4	Krylia Sovetov	1 – 2	Lokomotiv Moscow	Samara
17:30 SAMT (UTC+4)	Anyukov (yellow card) 21'; Chernov (yellow card) 58'; Karpov (yellow card) 71'; Gațcan (yellow card) 84'; Radonjić (yellow card) 86'; Sobolev 88'	Report	Zhemaletdinov (yellow card) 13'; Smolov 15'; Barinov (yellow card) 17'; Krychowiak 90+4'	Stadium: Samara Arena; Attendance: 22,459; Referee: Evgeny Turbin

12 August 2019 5	Rostov	1 – 0	Krylia Sovetov	Rostov-on-Don
21:00 SAMT (UTC+4)	Shomurodov 33'; Chistyakov (yellow card) 63'; Kozlov (yellow card) 64'; Pesyakov (yellow card) 88'	Report		Stadium: Rostov Arena; Attendance: 28,674; Referee: Vasili Kazartsev

17 August 2019 6	Ural Yekaterinburg	1 – 3	Krylia Sovetov	Yekaterinburg
15:00 SAMT (UTC+4)	Yemelyanov (yellow card) 30' (yellow-red card) 67'; Panyukov (yellow card) 81' (goal) 90+3'; Kulakov (yellow card) 88'	Report	Gînsari (yellow card) 16' (goal) 28'; Kombarov (yellow card) 45+2'; Kabutov (yellow card) 69'; Sobolev 79'; Radonjić 84'	Stadium: Central Stadium; Attendance: 22,304; Referee: Sergey Ivanov

25 August 2019 7	Krylia Sovetov	1 – 2	Spartak Moscow	Samara
20:00 SAMT (UTC+4)	Gînsari (yellow card) 23'; Sobolev 42'; Radonjić (yellow card) 71'; Anyukov (yellow card) 81'	Report	Dzhikiya (yellow card) 24'; Zobnin (yellow card) 29'; Larsson (yellow card) 32' (goal) 54'; Ayrton (yellow card) 83'; Guliyev (yellow card) 90'; Til 90+1'; Bakayev (yellow card) 90+4'	Stadium: Samara Arena; Attendance: 32,286; Referee: Sergey Lapochkin

30 August 2019 8	Krylia Sovetov	0 – 0	Dynamo Moscow	Samara
21:00 SAMT (UTC+4)	Mijailović (yellow card) 90'; Poluyakhtov (yellow card) 90+5'	Report	Kaboré (yellow card) 27'; Rausch (yellow card) 41'; Philipp (yellow card) 58'	Stadium: Samara Arena; Attendance: 14,728; Referee: vladislav Bezborodov

15 September 2019 9	Krasnodar	4 – 2	Krylia Sovetov	Krasnodar
20:00 SAMT (UTC+4)	Suleymanov 16'; Kambolov (yellow card) 45+2'; Olsson 48'; Martynovich (yellow card) 50'; Ryzhikov 57' (o.g.); Ari (penalty missed) 67' 67'; Spajić (yellow card) 74'; Vilhena (yellow card) 81'	Report	Sobolev 12' (penalty missed) 45+3'; Kabutov (yellow card) 34'; Gațcan (yellow card) 66'; Anton 75' (pen.)	Stadium: Krasnodar Stadium; Attendance: 26,131; Referee: Sergei Karasev

21 September 2019 10	Akhmat Grozny	1 – 1	Krylia Sovetov	Grozny
15:00 SAMT (UTC+4)	Utsiyev (yellow card) 12'; Ponce 27'; Roshi (yellow card) 33'; Ángel (yellow card) 67'	Report	Karpov (yellow card) 45' (goal) 90+4'; Chernov (yellow card) 50'	Stadium: Akhmat-Arena; Attendance: 8,737; Referee: Stanislav Vasilyev

28 September 2019 11	Krylia Sovetov	2 – 0	Tambov	Samara
15:00 SAMT (UTC+4)	Anton (yellow card) 39'; Anyukov (yellow card) 45+2'; Chernov (yellow card) 54'; Kabutov (yellow card) 65'; Sobolev 73' (pen.); Kanunnikov 74'; Karpov (yellow card) 77'	Report	Tetrashvili (yellow card) 7'; Rybin (yellow card) 37'; Karasyov (yellow card) 47'; Melkadze (yellow card) 54'; Oyewole (yellow card) 71'; Takazov (yellow card) 71'; Gritsayenko (yellow card) 87'	Stadium: Samara Arena; Attendance: 10,126; Referee: Sergey Ivanov

5 October 2019 12	Sochi	0 – 2	Krylia Sovetov	Sochi
20:00 SAMT (UTC+4)	Pomerko (yellow card) 21'; Lagator (yellow card) 51'; Kudryashov (yellow card) 67'; Tsallagov (yellow card) 76'	Report	Sobolev 4', 69' (yellow card) 34' (penalty missed) 61'; Mijailović (yellow card) 22'	Stadium: Fisht Olympic Stadium; Attendance: 7,923; Referee: Aleksei Matyunin

20 October 2019 13	Orenburg	0 – 1	Krylia Sovetov	Orenburg
12:30 SAMT (UTC+4)	Rogić (yellow card) 45'; Alves (yellow card) 56'; Ayupov (yellow card) 90+3'	Report	Anton 18' (yellow card) 63'; Kanunnikov (yellow card) 27'; Ryzhikov (yellow card) 89'; Anyukov (red card) 90+3'	Stadium: Gazovik Stadium; Attendance: 4,311; Referee: Vasili Kazartsev

27 October 2019 14	Krylia Sovetov	0 – 2	Zenit St.Petersburg	Samara
15:00 SAMT (UTC+4)	Mijailović (yellow card) 67'; Kombarov (yellow card) 88'	Report	Karavayev (yellow card) 23'; Zhirkov 28'; Dzyuba 90+3'	Stadium: Samara Arena; Attendance: 32,560; Referee: Stanislav Vasilyev

4 November 2019 15	Krylia Sovetov	0 – 0	Rubin Kazan	Samara
17:30 SAMT (UTC+4)	Chernov (yellow card) 18'; Gațcan (yellow card) 72'; Timofeyev (yellow card) 90+5'	Report	Poyarkov (yellow card) 7'; Konovalov (yellow card) 46'; Tashayev (yellow card) 61'; Kvaratskhelia (yellow card) 90+5'	Stadium: Samara Arena; Attendance: 10,842; Referee: Vladislav Bezborodov

9 November 2019 16	Spartak Moscow	2 – 0	Krylia Sovetov	Moscow
20:00 SAMT (UTC+4)	Ponce 3'; Bakayev (yellow card) 76' (goal) 83' (pen.); Král (yellow card) 80'	Report	Mijailović (red card) 71'; Karpov (red card) 82'	Stadium: Otkritie Arena; Attendance: 18,719; Referee: Vitali Meshkov

24 November 2019 17	CSKA Moscow	1 – 0	Krylia Sovetov	Moscow
20:00 SAMT (UTC+4)	Magnússon (yellow card) 65'; Vlašić 74'	Report	Sobolev (yellow card) 48'; Gațcan (yellow card) 56'; Radonjić (yellow card) 86'; Terekhov (yellow card) 90+2'	Stadium: VEB Arena; Attendance: 11,895; Referee: Vladislav Bezborodov

30 November 2019 18	Krylia Sovetov	0 – 1	Ufa	Samara
15:00 SAMT (UTC+4)	Lystsov (yellow card) 90'	Report	Bizjak 25'; Putsko (yellow card) 33'; Carp (yellow card) 49'; Jokić (yellow card) 70'	Stadium: Samara Arena; Attendance: 5,349; Referee: Stanislav Vasilyev

8 December 2019 19	Krylia Sovetov	2 – 3	Ural Yekaterinburg	Samara
15:00 SAMT (UTC+4)	Chernov 21'; Mijailović (yellow card) 63'; Radonjić 64'; Anyukov (yellow card) 79'; Sobolev (yellow card) 87'	Report	Fidler (yellow card) 26'; Pogrebnyak 43', 50'; Haroyan (yellow card) 53'; El Kabir 83'; Merkulov (yellow card) 90+3'	Stadium: Samara Arena; Attendance: 5,196; Referee: Igor Panin

28 February 2020 20	Krylia Sovetov	1 – 1	Orenburg	Samara
19:30 SAMT (UTC+4)	Mijailović (red card) 23'; Popović 42' (yellow card) 59'	Report	Despotović (penalty missed) 24' (yellow card) 73'; Kuat (yellow card) 31'; Malykh (yellow card) 40'; Alves 89'; Radaković (yellow card) 90+1'; Sivakow (yellow card) 90+2'	Stadium: Samara Arena; Attendance: 8,139; Referee: Vitali Meshkov

8 March 2020 21	Rubin Kazan	0 – 1	Krylia Sovetov	Kazan
15:00 SAMT (UTC+4)	Kvaratskhelia (yellow card) 17' (yellow-red card) 45+2'; Pablo (yellow card) 48'; Konovalov (yellow card) 72'	Report	Popović 42'; Kabutov (yellow card) 54'; Zinkovsky (yellow card) 62' (yellow-red card) 81'; Glushenkov (yellow card) 84'; Anton (yellow card) 90+1'	Stadium: Central Stadium; Attendance: 5,766; Referee: Vladimir Moskalev

16 March 2020 22	Tambov	3 – 0	Krylia Sovetov	Nizhny Novgorod
20:30 SAMT (UTC+4)	Melkadze 33' (yellow card) 60'; Obukhov 54'; Kilin (yellow card) 61' (goal) 80'	Report	Kabutov (yellow card) 25'; Chernov (yellow card) 45+1'; Radonjić (yellow card) 46'; Anyukov (yellow card) 65'	Stadium: Nizhny Novgorod Stadium; Attendance: 2,702; Referee: Sergei Karasev
Note: Match played at the Nizhny Novgorod Stadium in Nizhny Novgorod instead of Tambov's regular Spartak Stadium.

19 June 2020 23	Krylia Sovetov	2 – 4	Akhmat Grozny	Samara
20:00 SAMT (UTC+4)	Burlak 6'; Chernov (yellow card) 62'; Golenkov (yellow card) 79'; Glushenkov 88'; Gațcan (yellow card) 90+1'	Report	Berisha (yellow card) 1' (goal) 69'; Ilyin 54', 66'; Glushakov 59'; Nižić (yellow card) 72'	Stadium: Samara Arena; Referee: Aleksey Eskov
Note: Match originally scheduled for 22 March, but postponed on 17 March due to the COVID-19 pandemic.

26 June 2020 24	Zenit St.Petersburg	2 – 1	Krylia Sovetov	Saint Petersburg
21:30 SAMT (UTC+4)	Kuzyayev (yellow card) 21'; Ivanović (yellow card) 47'; Dzyuba 64' (pen.), 67' (pen.)	Report	Chernov (yellow card) 30'; Glushenkov 44'; Kombarov (yellow card) 52'; Timofeyev (yellow card) 62'	Stadium: Krestovsky Stadium; Referee: Pavel Kukyan
Note: Match originally scheduled for 5 April, but postponed on 17 March due to the COVID-19 pandemic.

30 June 2020 25	Lokomotiv Moscow	1 – 1	Krylia Sovetov	Moscow
19:00 SAMT (UTC+4)	Ignatyev (yellow card) 27' (yellow-red card) 50'; Ćorluka (yellow card) 48'; Idowu (yellow card) 75'; Eder (yellow card) 87'; Al.Miranchuk 90+5'	Report	Timofeyev (yellow card) 10'; Radonjić 14'; Poluyakhtov (yellow card) 33'; Kabutov (yellow card) 45+2'; Gațcan (yellow card) 52'; Hadi (yellow card) 71' (yellow-red card) 73'; Frolov (yellow card) 82'	Stadium: RZD Arena; Referee: Aleksey Sukhoy
Note: Match originally scheduled for 11 April, but postponed on 1 April due to the COVID-19 pandemic.

4 July 2020 26	Krylia Sovetov	0 – 0	Rostov	Samara
19:30 SAMT (UTC+4)	Gațcan (yellow card) 22'; Poluyakhtov (red card) 25'; Glushenkov (yellow card) 39'; Chicherin (yellow card) 57'	Report	Chistyakov (yellow card) 11'; Normann (yellow card) 41'; Vedernikov (yellow card) 45+1' (yellow-red card) 55'	Stadium: Samara Arena; Referee: Nikolay Voloshin
Note: Match originally scheduled for 19 April, but postponed on 1 April due to the COVID-19 pandemic.

7 July 2020 27	Arsenal Tula	2 – 4	Krylia Sovetov	Tula
21:30 SAMT (UTC+4)	Denisov 8'; Lesovoy (yellow card) 42'; Kostadinov (yellow card) 50'; Čaušić (yellow card) 56'; Lutsenko 79'	Report	Chicherin (yellow card) 11'; Timofeyev (yellow card) 19'; Kombarov (yellow card) 32'; Lystsov 38' (yellow card) 41'; Popović 57'; Glushenkov 62'; Radonjić 69'; Chernov (yellow card) 83'	Stadium: Arsenal Stadium; Referee: Mikhail Vilkov
Note: Match originally scheduled for 25 April, but postponed on 1 April due to the COVID-19 pandemic.

12 July 2020 28	Dynamo Moscow	2 – 0	Krylia Sovetov	Moscow
19:30 SAMT (UTC+4)	Philipp 15' (pen.); Komlichenko 24' (pen.) (yellow card) 35'; Skopintsev (yellow card) 32'; Rykov (yellow card) 43'; Ordets (yellow card) 71'; Pliyev (red card) 90+2'	Report	Karpov (yellow card) 23'; Radonjić (yellow card) 40'; Lystsov (yellow card) 68'; Kombarov (yellow card) 90+2'; Kiselyov (yellow card) 90+3'	Stadium: VTB Arena; Referee: Sergei Karasev
Note: Match originally scheduled for 3 May, but postponed on 1 April due to the COVID-19 pandemic.

15 July 2020 29	Krylia Sovetov	0 – 0	Krasnodar	Samara
19:00 SAMT (UTC+4)	Kabutov (yellow card) 42'; Timofeyev (yellow card) 72'	Report	Fernandes (yellow card) 15'; Petrov (yellow card) 39' (yellow-red card) 82'; Utkin (yellow card) 65'; Ramírez (yellow card) 70'; Wanderson (yellow card) 90+2'	Stadium: Samara Arena; Referee: Vladimir Moskalev
Note: Match originally scheduled for 11 May, but postponed on 1 April due to the COVID-19 pandemic.

22 July 2020 30	Krylia Sovetov	3 – 0	Sochi	Samara
20:00 SAMT (UTC+4)				Stadium: Samara Arena
Note: Match originally scheduled for 17 May, but postponed on 1 April due to the COVID-19 pandemic. Match postponed for a second time on 20 July due to COVID-19 within the Sochi squad, and awarded to Krylia Sovetov on 23 July.

==== League table ====
Pos	Team	Pld	W	D	L	GF	GA	GD	Pts	Qualification or relegation
12	Sochi	30	8	9	13	40	39	+1	33	
13	Akhmat Grozny	30	7	10	13	27	46	−19	31 (Note: Head-to-head points: Akhmat Grozny 8, Tambov 4, Krylia Sovetov Samara 4. Head-to-head goal difference: Akhmat Grozny +3, Tambov 0, Krylia Sovetov Samara –3)	
14	Tambov	30	9	4	17	37	41	−4	31	
15	Krylia Sovetov Samara (R)	30	8	7	15	33	40	−7	31	Relegation to Football National League
16	Orenburg (R)	30	7	6	17	28	52	−24	27	Relegation to Football National League

Source: Russian Premier Liga, Soccerway
Rules for classification: 1) Points; 2) Head-to-head points; 3) Head-to-head matches won; 4) Head-to-head goal difference; 5) Head-to-head goals scored; 6) Matches won; 7) Goal difference; 8) Goals scored; 9) Play-off.
(R) Relegated

=== Russian Cup ===
25 September 2019 Round of 32	Torpedo Moscow	2 – 0	Krylia Sovetov	Moscow
19:30 MSK (UTC+3)	Shorkin (yellow card) 28' (goal) 36'; Sergeyev (yellow card) 38' (goal) 45'; Samsonov (yellow card) 74'	Report	Radonjić (yellow card) 40'; Anton (yellow card) 43'; Timofeyev (yellow card) 45'; Burlak (yellow card) 48'; Smirnov (yellow card) 88'	Stadium: Eduard Streltsov Stadium; Attendance: 3,682; Referee: Yevgeni Kukulyak

== Squad statistics ==
As of match played 15 July 2020

=== Appearances and goals ===
No.	Pos	Nat	Player	Total		Premier League		Russian Cup	
No.	Pos	Nat	Player	Apps	Goals	Apps	Goals	Apps	Goals
1	GK	(Russia) RUS	Sergey Ryzhikov	19	0	19	0	0	0
2	DF	(Russia) RUS	Vladimir Poluyakhtov	12	0	11+1	0	0	0
3	DF	(Russia) RUS	Nikita Chernov	23	1	23	1	0	0
5	DF	(Russia) RUS	Vitali Lystsov	9	1	7+1	1	1	0
7	MF	(Iraq) IRQ	Safaa Hadi	4	0	0+4	0	0	0
8	MF	(Moldova) MDA	Alexandru Gațcan	22	0	21+1	0	0	0
9	FW	(Croatia) CRO	Dejan Radonjić	28	4	8+19	4	1	0
10	MF	(Russia) RUS	Anton Terekhov	13	0	1+11	0	1	0
11	MF	(Slovenia) SLO	Denis Popović	10	3	8+2	3	0	0
15	MF	(Russia) RUS	Maksim Glushenkov	10	3	8+2	3	0	0
17	FW	(Russia) RUS	Anton Zinkovsky	28	0	21+6	0	0+1	0
18	DF	(Algeria) ALG	Mehdi Zeffane	6	0	6	0	0	0
20	MF	(Serbia) SRB	Srđan Mijailović	16	1	12+3	1	1	0
23	DF	(Russia) RUS	Dmitri Kombarov	22	0	20+2	0	0	0
28	MF	(Romania) ROU	Paul Anton	18	2	14+3	2	1	0
39	GK	(Russia) RUS	Yevgeny Frolov	10	0	10	0	0	0
40	MF	(Russia) RUS	Artyom Timofeyev	22	0	18+3	0	1	0
44	DF	(Russia) RUS	Nikita Chicherin	7	0	4+2	0	1	0
50	DF	(Russia) RUS	Maksim Karpov	21	1	21	1	0	0
52	MF	(Russia) RUS	Danila Smirnov	4	0	0+3	0	1	0
57	MF	(Russia) RUS	Vladislav Tyurin	1	0	0+1	0	0	0
69	FW	(Russia) RUS	Yegor Golenkov	9	0	0+9	0	0	0
77	MF	(Russia) RUS	Dmitri Kabutov	29	0	24+4	0	0+1	0
78	FW	(Russia) RUS	Gennadi Kiselyov	2	0	0+2	0	0	0
81	GK	(Russia) RUS	Bogdan Ovsyannikov	1	0	0	0	1	0
86	FW	(Russia) RUS	Dmitri Molchanov	2	0	0+2	0	0	0
90	DF	(Russia) RUS	Taras Burlak	9	2	8	2	1	0
99	FW	(Russia) RUS	Maksim Kanunnikov	16	1	12+3	1	1	0
Players away from the club on loan:
14	MF	(Moldova) MDA	Radu Gînsari	10	0	7+3	0	0	0
Players who appeared for Krylia Sovetov but left during the season:
7	FW	(Russia) RUS	Aleksandr Sobolev	19	10	18	10	0+1	0
22	DF	(Russia) RUS	Aleksandr Anyukov	18	0	18	0	0	0

=== Goal scorers ===
Place	Position	Nation	Number	Name	Premier League	Russian Cup	Total
1	FW	(Russia)	7	Aleksandr Sobolev	10	0	10
2	FW	(Croatia)	9	Dejan Radonjić	4	0	4
3	MF	(Slovenia)	11	Denis Popović	3	0	3
3	MF	(Russia)	15	Maksim Glushenkov	3	0	3
5	MF	(Romania)	28	Paul Anton	2	0	2
5	DF	(Russia)	90	Taras Burlak	2	0	2
7	MF	(Serbia)	20	Srđan Mijailović	1	0	1
7	MF	(Moldova)	14	Radu Gînsari	1	0	1
7	DF	(Russia)	50	Maksim Karpov	1	0	1
7	FW	(Russia)	99	Maksim Kanunnikov	1	0	1
7	DF	(Russia)	3	Nikita Chernov	1	0	1
7	DF	(Russia)	5	Vitali Lystsov	1	0	1
Total					32	0	32

=== Clean sheet ===
Place	Position	Nation	Number	Name	Premier League	Russian Cup	Total
1	GK	(Russia)	1	Sergey Ryzhikov	6	0	6
2	GK	(Russia)	39	Yevgeny Frolov	3	0	3
Total					9	0	9

=== Disciplinary record ===
Number	Nation	Position	Name	Premier League		Russian Cup		Total	
Number	Nation	Position	Name	Yellow card	Red card	Yellow card	Red card	Yellow card	Red card
1	(Russia)	GK	Sergey Ryzhikov	1	0	0	0	1	0
2	(Russia)	DF	Vladimir Poluyakhtov	3	1	0	0	3	1
3	(Russia)	DF	Nikita Chernov	8	0	0	0	8	0
5	(Russia)	DF	Vitali Lystsov	3	0	0	0	3	0
7	(Iraq)	MF	Safaa Hadi	2	1	0	0	2	1
8	(Moldova)	MF	Alexandru Gațcan	7	0	0	0	7	0
9	(Croatia)	FW	Dejan Radonjić	5	0	1	0	6	0
10	(Russia)	MF	Anton Terekhov	1	0	0	0	1	0
11	(Slovenia)	MF	Denis Popović	1	0	0	0	1	0
15	(Russia)	MF	Maksim Glushenkov	2	0	0	0	2	0
17	(Russia)	FW	Anton Zinkovsky	2	1	0	0	2	1
20	(Serbia)	MF	Srđan Mijailović	5	2	0	0	5	2
23	(Russia)	DF	Dmitri Kombarov	6	0	0	0	6	0
28	(Romania)	MF	Paul Anton	3	0	1	0	4	0
39	(Russia)	GK	Yevgeny Frolov	1	0	0	0	1	0
40	(Russia)	MF	Artyom Timofeyev	5	0	1	0	6	0
44	(Russia)	DF	Nikita Chicherin	2	0	0	0	2	0
50	(Russia)	DF	Maksim Karpov	4	1	0	0	4	1
52	(Russia)	MF	Danila Smirnov	0	0	1	0	1	0
69	(Russia)	FW	Yegor Golenkov	1	0	0	0	1	0
77	(Russia)	MF	Dmitri Kabutov	8	0	0	0	8	0
78	(Russia)	FW	Gennadi Kiselyov	1	0	0	0	1	0
90	(Russia)	DF	Taras Burlak	0	0	1	0	1	0
99	(Russia)	FW	Maksim Kanunnikov	1	0	0	0	1	0
Players away on loan:
14	(Moldova)	MF	Radu Gînsari	2	0	0	0	2	0
Players who left Krylia Sovetov during the season:
7	(Russia)	FW	Aleksandr Sobolev	5	0	0	0	5	0
22	(Russia)	DF	Aleksandr Anyukov	5	1	0	0	5	1
Total				84	7	5	0	89	7
