= Bogdan Ovsyannikov =

Russian footballer

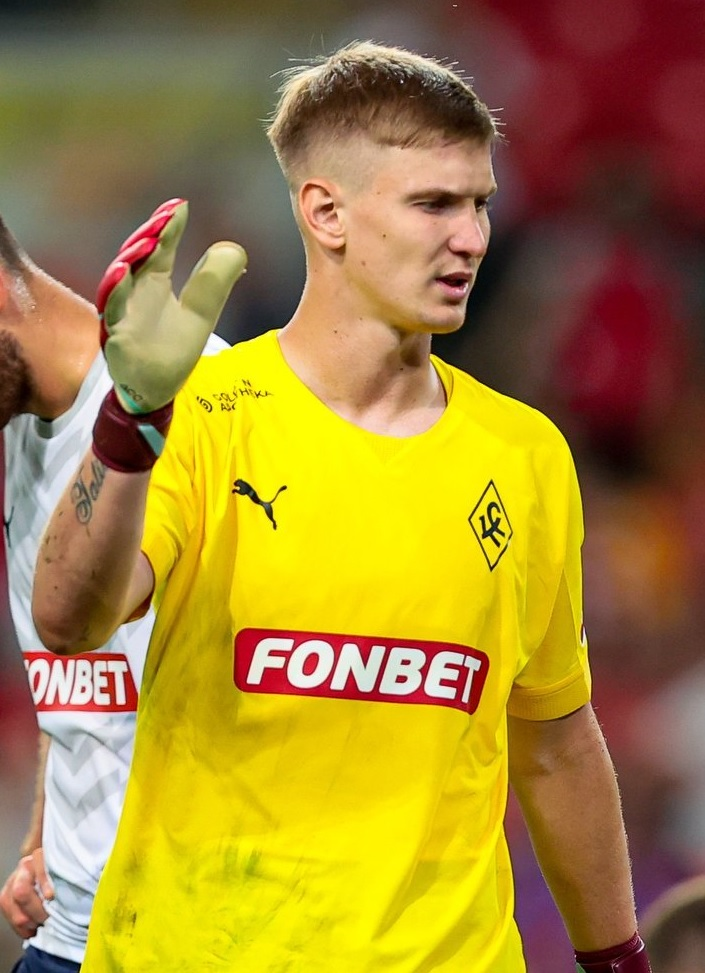
- Ovsyannikov with Krylia Sovetov in 2022

Personal information
- Full name: Bogdan Igorevich Ovsyannikov
- Date of birth: 5 January 1999 (age 27)
- Place of birth: Nizhny Novgorod, Russia
- Height: 1.89 m (6 ft 2 in)
- Position: Goalkeeper

Team information
- Current team: Orenburg
- Number: 1

Youth career
- 2014–2015: Volga Nizhny Novgorod
- 2016–2017: Krylia Sovetov Samara
- 2018–2020: Krylia Sovetov Samara

Senior career*
Years	Team	Apps	(Gls)
2017	Krylia Sovetov-2 Samara	2	(0)
2017–2025	Krylia Sovetov Samara	26	(0)
2017–2018	→ União de Leiria (loan)	0	(0)
2020–2021	Krylia Sovetov-2 Samara	8	(0)
2025–	Orenburg	43	(0)
- * Club domestic league appearances and goals as of 21 November 2026

Bogdan Igorevich Ovsyannikov (Russian: Богдан Игоревич Овсянников; born 5 January 1999) is a Russian football player who plays as a goalkeeper for Orenburg.

== Club career ==
He made his debut in the Russian Professional Football League for FC Krylia Sovetov-2 Samara on 27 July 2017 in a game against FC Volga Ulyanovsk. He made his debut for the main squad of PFC Krylia Sovetov Samara on 25 September 2019 in a Russian Cup game against FC Torpedo Moscow. He made his Russian Football National League debut for Krylia Sovetov on 9 October 2020 against FC Tekstilshchik Ivanovo.

Ovsyannikov made his Russian Premier League debut for Krylia Sovetov on 14 May 2022 against FC Akhmat Grozny.

== Career statistics ==
As of 21 November 2026

Club	Season	League			Cup		Total	
Club	Season	Division	Apps	Goals	Apps	Goals	Apps	Goals
Krylia Sovetov-2 Samara	2017–18	Russian Second League	2	0	—		2	0
Krylia Sovetov-2 Samara	2020–21	Russian Second League	8	0	—		8	0
Krylia Sovetov-2 Samara	Total		10	0	—		10	0
Krylia Sovetov Samara	2018–19	Russian Premier League	0	0	0	0	0	0
Krylia Sovetov Samara	2019–20	Russian Premier League	0	0	1	0	1	0
Krylia Sovetov Samara	2020–21	Russian First League	9	0	2	0	11	0
Krylia Sovetov Samara	2021–22	Russian Premier League	2	0	2	0	4	0
Krylia Sovetov Samara	2022–23	Russian Premier League	6	0	5	0	11	0
Krylia Sovetov Samara	2023–24	Russian Premier League	9	0	1	0	10	0
Krylia Sovetov Samara	2024–25	Russian Premier League	0	0	2	0	2	0
Krylia Sovetov Samara	Total		26	0	13	0	39	0
Orenburg	2025–26	Russian Premier League	29	0	0	0	29	0
Orenburg	2026–27	Russian Premier League	14	0	0	0	14	0
Orenburg	Total		43	0	0	0	43	0
Career total			79	0	13	0	92	0
