= Gennadi Kiselyov =

Russian footballer

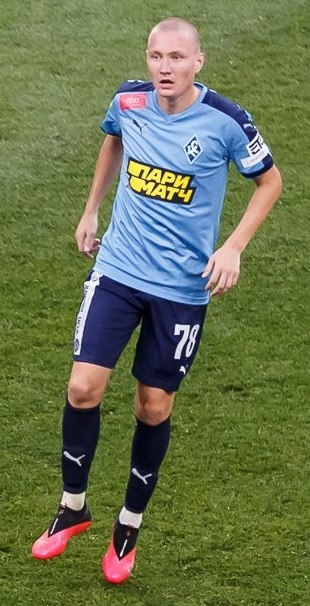
- Kiselyov with Krylia Sovetov in 2020

Personal information
- Full name: Gennadi Romanovich Kiselyov
- Date of birth: 3 January 1999 (age 27)
- Place of birth: Yoshkar-Ola, Russia
- Height: 1.76 m (5 ft 9 in)
- Position: Right-back

Team information
- Current team: Leningradets
- Number: 78

Youth career
- 2006–2013: Spartak Yoshkar-Ola
- 2013–2015: Konoplyov football academy

Senior career*
Years	Team	Apps	(Gls)
2016	Lada-Tolyatti	9	(2)
2016–2021	Krylia Sovetov Samara	3	(0)
2017–2018	→ Krylia Sovetov-2 Samara	18	(0)
2020	→ Rotor Volgograd (loan)	0	(0)
2020–2021	→ Irtysh Omsk (loan)	30	(1)
2021–2022	Torpedo Moscow	0	(0)
2021–2022	→ Metallurg Lipetsk (loan)	25	(0)
2022	Znamya Truda Orekhovo-Zuyevo	10	(1)
2023–2026	Spartak Kostroma	97	(3)
2026–	Leningradets	0	(0)

International career^{‡}
2017–2019	Russia U-20	12	(1)
2017	Russia U-19	4	(0)
2019	Russia U-21	1	(0)
- * Club domestic league appearances and goals as of 16 May 2026 ‡ National team caps and goals as of 14 June 2019

Gennadi Romanovich Kiselyov (Russian: Геннадий Романович Киселёв; born 3 January 1999) is a Russian football player who plays for Leningradets.

== Club career ==
Kiselyov made his debut in the Russian Professional Football League for Lada-Tolyatti on 14 April 2016 in a game against Chelyabinsk.

He made his Russian Premier League debut for Krylia Sovetov Samara on 26 May 2019 in a game against CSKA Moscow, as a 63rd-minute substitute for Mohammed Rabiu.

On 4 February 2020, he was loaned to Rotor Volgograd until the end of the 2019–20 season.

== Career statistics ==
As of 16 May 2026

Club	Season	League			Cup		Other		Total	
Club	Season	Division	Apps	Goals	Apps	Goals	Apps	Goals	Apps	Goals
Lada-Tolyatti	2015–16	Russian Second League	9	2	—		—		9	2
Krylia Sovetov Samara	2016–17	Russian Premier League	0	0	0	0	—		0	0
Krylia Sovetov Samara	2017–18	Russian First League	0	0	0	0	1 (Note: Appearances in FNL Cup)	0	1	0
Krylia Sovetov Samara	2018–18	Russian Premier League	1	0	0	0	0	0	1	0
Krylia Sovetov Samara	2019–20	Russian Premier League	2	0	0	0	—		2	0
Krylia Sovetov Samara	Total		3	0	0	0	1	0	4	0
Krylia Sovetov-2 Samara	2017–18	Russian Second League	18	0	—		—		18	0
Rotor Volgograd (loan)	2019–20	Russian First League	0	0	—		4	0	4	0
Irtysh Omsk (loan)	2020–21	Russian First League	30	1	1	0	—		31	1
Torpedo Moscow	2021–22	Russian First League	0	0	1	0	—		1	0
Metallurg Lipetsk (loan)	2021–22	Russian First League	25	0	1	0	—		26	0
Znamya Truda	2022–23	Russian Second League	10	1	0	0	—		10	1
Spartak Kostroma	2022–23	Russian Second League	12	1	—		—		12	1
Spartak Kostroma	2023–24	Russian Second League A	34	1	1	0	—		35	1
Spartak Kostroma	2024–25	Russian Second League A	34	1	4	2	—		38	3
Spartak Kostroma	2025–26	Russian First League	17	0	1	0	—		18	0
Spartak Kostroma	Total		97	3	6	2	1	0	103	5
Career total			192	7	9	2	5	0	206	9
