= Danila Smirnov =

Russian footballer (born 2001)

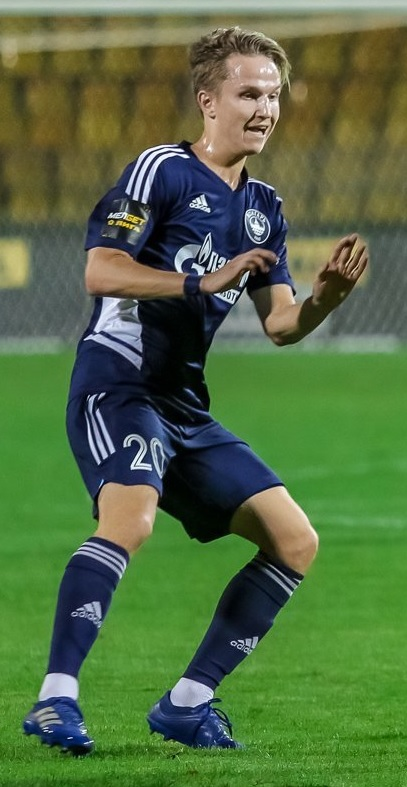
- Smirnov with Volgar Astrakhan in 2022

Personal information
- Full name: Danila Olegovich Smirnov
- Date of birth: 7 June 2001 (age 25)
- Place of birth: Samara, Russia
- Height: 1.78 m (5 ft 10 in)
- Position: Central midfielder

Team information
- Current team: Dynamo St. Petersburg
- Number: 7

Youth career
- 2016–2020: Krylia Sovetov Samara
- 2021: Krylia Sovetov Samara

Senior career*
Years	Team	Apps	(Gls)
2017–2018	Krylia Sovetov-2 Samara	9	(0)
2019–2022	Krylia Sovetov Samara	7	(0)
2020–2021	Krylia Sovetov-2 Samara	10	(0)
2022–2025	Volgar Astrakhan	53	(3)
2025	Astrakhan	17	(1)
2025–2026	Kuban Krasnodar	22	(1)
2026–	Dynamo St. Petersburg	13	(1)
- * Club domestic league appearances and goals as of 1 November 2026

Danila Olegovich Smirnov (Russian: Данила Олегович Смирнов; born 7 June 2001) is a Russian football player who plays as a central midfielder for Dynamo St. Petersburg.

== Club career ==
He made his debut in the Russian Professional Football League for FC Krylia Sovetov-2 Samara on 13 October 2017 in a game against FC Volga Ulyanovsk.

He made his debut for the senior squad of PFC Krylia Sovetov Samara on 25 September 2019 in a Russian Cup game against FC Torpedo Moscow. He made his Russian Premier League debut for Krylia Sovetov on 4 July 2020 in a game against FC Rostov, replacing Dmitri Kabutov in the 80th minute.

== Career statistics ==
As of 21 May 2022

Club	Season	League			Cup		Continental		Other		Total	
Club	Season	Division	Apps	Goals	Apps	Goals	Apps	Goals	Apps	Goals	Apps	Goals
Krylia Sovetov-2 Samara	2017–18	PFL	9	0	–		–		–		9	0
Krylia Sovetov-2 Samara	2020–21	PFL	10	0	–		–		–		10	0
Krylia Sovetov-2 Samara	Total		19	0	0	0	0	0	0	0	19	0
Krylia Sovetov Samara	2019–20	RPL	3	0	1	0	–		2 (Note: Appearances in the FNL Cup)	0	6	0
Krylia Sovetov Samara	2020–21	FNL	4	0	0	0	–		–		4	0
Krylia Sovetov Samara	2021–22	RPL	0	0	0	0	–		–		0	0
Krylia Sovetov Samara	Total		7	0	1	0	0	0	2	0	10	0
Career total			26	0	1	0	0	0	2	0	29	0
