= Deriglazov =

Deriglazov (Russian: Дериглазов) is a Russian masculine surname, its feminine counterpart is Deriglazova. Notable people with the surname include:

- Ilya Deriglazov (born 1983), Russian football player
- Inna Deriglazova (born 1990), Russian foil fencer
