= Ilya Buryukin =

Russian footballer

Personal information
- Full name: Ilya Andreyevich Buryukin
- Date of birth: 15 January 2000 (age 26)
- Place of birth: Omsk, Russia
- Height: 1.70 m (5 ft 7 in)
- Position: Midfielder

Youth career
- 2017–2018: PFC Krylia Sovetov Samara

Senior career*
| Years | Team | Apps | (Gls) |
| 2016 | FC Lada-Tolyatti | 2 | (0) |
| 2017–2018 | FC Krylia Sovetov-2 Samara | 19 | (1) |
| 2018–2023 | FC Irtysh Omsk | 66 | (8) |
| 2023–2024 | FC Salyut Belgorod | 28 | (2) |
- * Club domestic league appearances and goals

Ilya Andreyevich Buryukin (Russian: Илья Андреевич Бурюкин; born 15 January 2000) is a Russian former football player.

== Club career ==
He made his debut in the Russian Football National League for FC Irtysh Omsk on 8 August 2020 in a game against FC Nizhny Novgorod, as a starter.
