= Dmitri Molchanov =

Russian footballer

Personal information
- Full name: Dmitri Sergeyevich Molchanov
- Date of birth: 1 October 2000 (age 26)
- Place of birth: Vladivostok, Russia
- Height: 1.76 m (5 ft 9 in)
- Position: Forward

Youth career
- –2014: FC Okean Nakhodka
- 2014–2015: Konoplyov football academy
- 2015–2017: FC Okean Nakhodka

Senior career*
Years	Team	Apps	(Gls)
2017–2019	FC Chertanovo Moscow	25	(2)
2018–2019	→ FC Chertanovo-2 Moscow	18	(2)
2019–2022	PFC Krylia Sovetov Samara	2	(0)
2020–2021	→ FC Chertanovo Moscow (loan)	29	(2)
2021–2022	→ FC Dynamo Bryansk (loan)	28	(5)
2022–2024	FC Dynamo Bryansk	51	(5)

International career^{‡}
2017–2018	Russia U-18	11	(2)
2018–2019	Russia U-19	6	(0)
2019	Russia U-20	5	(0)
- * Club domestic league appearances and goals as of 8 June 2024 ‡ National team caps and goals as of 8 August 2019

Dmitri Sergeyevich Molchanov (Russian: Дмитрий Сергеевич Молчанов; born 1 October 2000) is a Russian football player.

== Club career ==
He made his debut in the Russian Professional Football League for FC Chertanovo Moscow on 11 August 2017 in a game against FSK Dolgoprudny. He made his Russian Football National League debut for Chertanovo on 29 July 2018 in a game against FC Baltika Kaliningrad.

He made his Russian Premier League debut for PFC Krylia Sovetov Samara on 7 July 2020 in a game against FC Arsenal Tula, replacing Dmitri Kabutov in the 84th minute.
