= Ilya Deriglazov =

Russian footballer

Personal information
- Full name: Ilya Aleksandrovich Deriglazov
- Date of birth: 27 November 1983 (age 42)
- Height: 1.80 m (5 ft 11 in)
- Position: Defender

Senior career*
Years	Team	Apps	(Gls)
2000	FC Krylia Sovetov-2 Samara	14	(0)
2001–2005	FC Krylia Sovetov Samara	0	(0)
2003	→ FC Chkalovets-Olimpik Novosibirsk (loan)	20	(8)
2006–2009	FC Lada Togliatti	89	(5)
2010	FC Metallurg-Yenisey Krasnoyarsk	23	(1)
2011–2012	FC Volga Ulyanovsk	34	(2)
2012–2013	FC Sakhalin Yuzhno-Sakhalinsk	13	(1)
2013	FC Volga Ulyanovsk	7	(0)
- * Club domestic league appearances and goals

Ilya Aleksandrovich Deriglazov (Russian: Илья Александрович Дериглазов; born 27 November 1983) is a former Russian professional football player.

== Club career ==
He played in the Russian Football National League for FC Lada Togliatti in 2006.
