= Maksim Karpov (footballer) =

Russian footballer

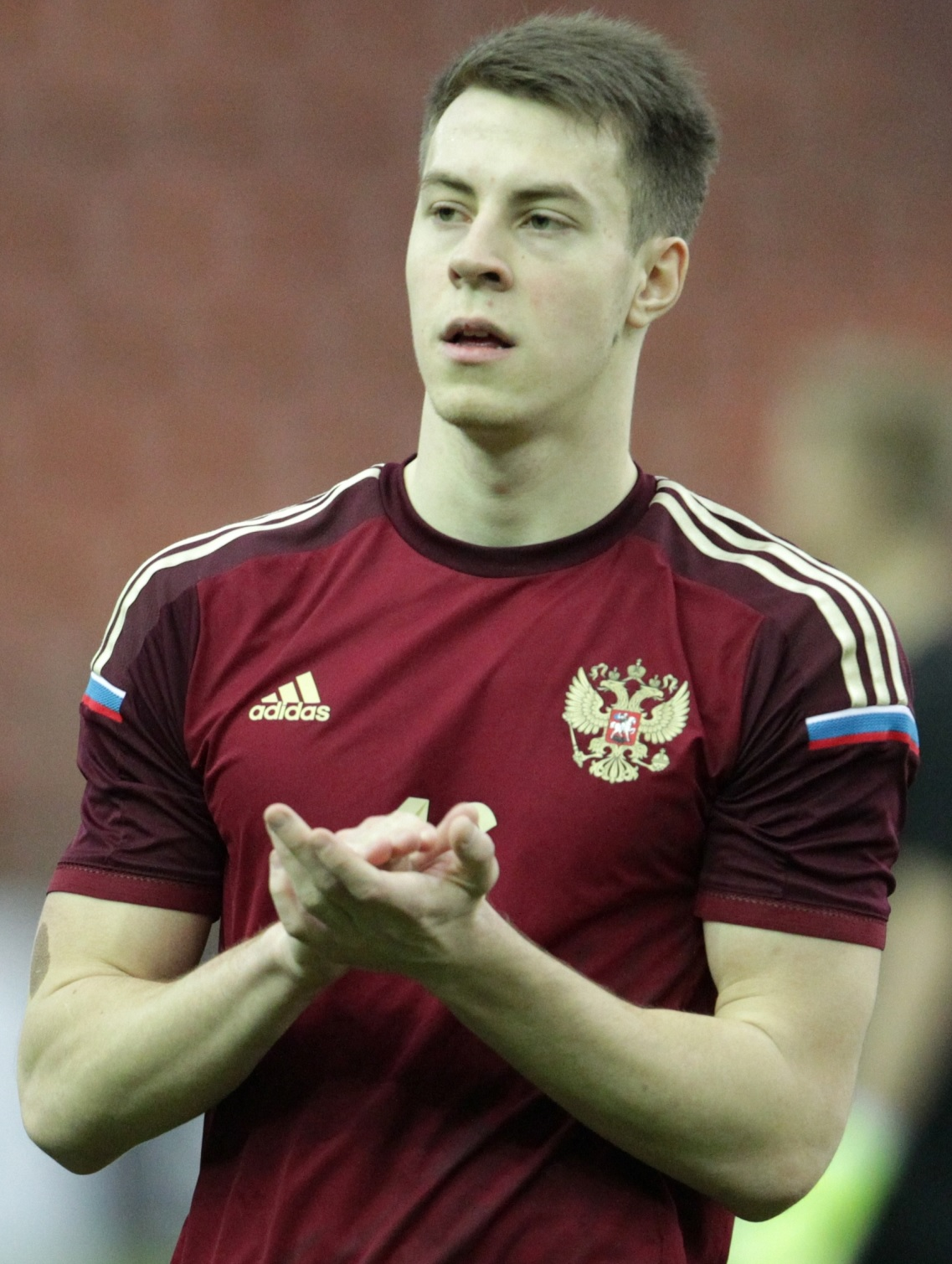
- Karpov with Russia U-21 in 2016

Personal information
- Full name: Maksim Olegovich Karpov
- Date of birth: 17 March 1995 (age 31)
- Place of birth: Saint Petersburg, Russia
- Height: 1.87 m (6 ft 2 in)
- Position: Defender

Youth career
- Moskovskaya Zastava St. Petersburg
- 2007–2009: Zenit St. Petersburg
- 2009–2013: Moskovskaya Zastava St. Petersburg

Senior career*
Years	Team	Apps	(Gls)
2013–2018	Zenit St.Petersburg	0	(0)
2013–2017	Zenit-2 St.Petersburg	73	(2)
2018	→ SKA-Khabarovsk (loan)	3	(0)
2018	→ Rotor Volgograd (loan)	13	(0)
2019–2021	Krylia Sovetov Samara	29	(1)
2021	→ Khimki (loan)	5	(0)
2022	Metallurg Lipetsk	6	(0)
2023–2024	Zvezda St. Petersburg	10	(2)
2024	Spartak-2 Moscow	3	(0)

International career^{‡}
2013–2014	Russia U-19	9	(0)
2014–2016	Russia U-21	9	(2)
- * Club domestic league appearances and goals as of 7 July 2024 ‡ National team caps and goals as of 7 October 2016

Maksim Olegovich Karpov (Russian: Максим Олегович Карпов; born 17 March 1995) is a Russian football player who plays as a centre-back.

== Club career ==
Karpov made his professional debut in the Russian Professional Football League for farm club FC Zenit-2 St. Petersburg on 15 July 2013 in a game against FC Tosno. He made his debut for the senior squad of FC Zenit St. Petersburg on 23 November 2017 in a UEFA Europa League match against FK Vardar.

On 12 January 2018, Karpov joined SKA-Khabarovsk on loan for the remainder of the 2017–18 season.

On 13 January 2019, he joined Krylia Sovetov Samara on a permanent basis. On 2 September 2021, he moved to Khimki on loan.

== Career statistics ==
=== Club ===
As of 12 December 2021

Club	Season	League			Cup		Continental		Other		Total	
Club	Season	Division	Apps	Goals	Apps	Goals	Apps	Goals	Apps	Goals	Apps	Goals
Zenit-2 St. Petersburg	2013–14	PFL	18	0	–		–		–		18	0
Zenit-2 St. Petersburg	2014–15	PFL	21	1	–		–		–		21	1
Zenit-2 St. Petersburg	2015–16	FNL	1	0	–		–		4 (Note: Appearances in the FNL Cup)	0	5	0
Zenit-2 St. Petersburg	2016–17	FNL	25	0	–		–		–		25	0
Zenit-2 St. Petersburg	2017–18	FNL	8	1	–		–		–		8	1
Zenit-2 St. Petersburg	Total		73	2	0	0	0	0	4	0	77	2
Zenit St. Petersburg	2013–14	RPL	0	0	0	0	0	0	–		0	0
Zenit St. Petersburg	2016–17	RPL	0	0	0	0	0	0	–		0	0
Zenit St. Petersburg	2017–18	RPL	0	0	0	0	1 (Note: Appearance in the UEFA Europa League)	0	–		1	0
Zenit St. Petersburg	Total		0	0	0	0	1	0	0	0	1	0
SKA-Khabarovsk	2017–18	RPL	3	0	1	0	–		–		4	0
Rotor Volgograd	2018–19	FNL	13	0	–		–		–		13	0
Krylia Sovetov Samara	2018–19	RPL	0	0	–		–		–		0	0
Krylia Sovetov Samara	2019–20	RPL	21	1	0	0	–		–		21	1
Krylia Sovetov Samara	2020–21	FNL	8	0	0	0	–		–		8	0
Krylia Sovetov Samara	2021–22	RPL	0	0	–		–		–		0	0
Krylia Sovetov Samara	Total		29	1	0	0	0	0	0	0	29	1
Khimki	2021–22	RPL	5	0	2	0	–		–		7	0
Career total			123	3	3	0	1	0	4	0	131	3
