= Vitali Lystsov =

Russian footballer

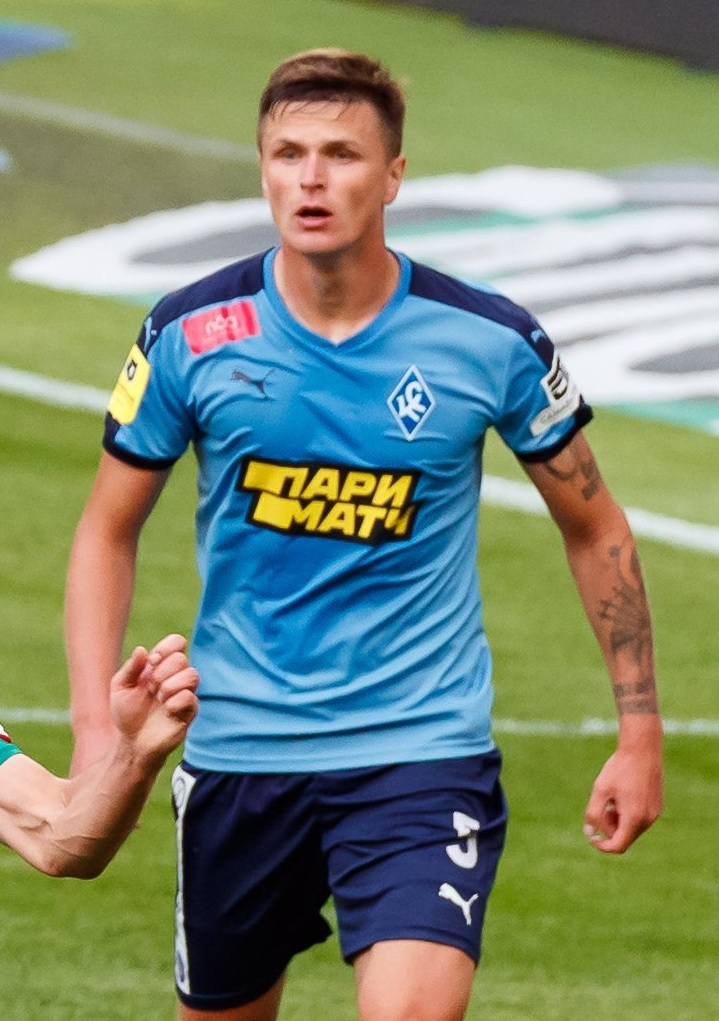
- Lystsov with Krylia Sovetov in 2020

Personal information
- Full name: Vitali Aleksandrovich Lystsov
- Date of birth: 11 July 1995 (age 31)
- Place of birth: Voronezh, Russia
- Height: 1.92 m (6 ft 4 in)
- Position: Centre-back

Team information
- Current team: Chelyabinsk
- Number: 50

Youth career
- 2007–2014: Lokomotiv Moscow

Senior career*
Years	Team	Apps	(Gls)
2012–2014	Lokomotiv Moscow	1	(0)
2014–2015	União de Leiria	7	(0)
2015	→ Benfica B (loan)	14	(0)
2015–2019	Benfica B	48	(4)
2016–2017	→ Tondela (loan)	6	(1)
2019–2020	Krylia Sovetov Samara	8	(1)
2020–2022	Lokomotiv Moscow	5	(0)
2021–2022	→ Akhmat Grozny (loan)	13	(1)
2023	Khimki	8	(0)
2023–2024	União de Leiria	15	(0)
2025	Boavista	8	(1)
2025–2026	Shinnik Yaroslavl	24	(1)
2026–	Chelyabinsk	0	(0)

International career
2011	Russia U16	5	(1)
2011–2012	Russia U17	10	(0)
2013	Russia U18	7	(1)
2013–2014	Russia U19	5	(1)
2014–2016	Russia U21	9	(1)
- * Club domestic league appearances and goals as of 16 May 2026

Vitali Aleksandrovich Lystsov (Russian: Виталий Александрович Лысцов; born 11 July 1995) is a Russian professional footballer who plays as a centre-back for Chelyabinsk.

== Club career ==
Born in Voronezh and a product of FC Lokomotiv Moscow's football youth department, Lystsov debuted in the Russian Premier League for Lokomotiv Moscow in a match against FC Krasnodar on 24 November 2012. About two years later, he moved to U.D. Leiria in Portugal to play in the country's third-level league.

On 2 February 2015, Lystsov joined Portuguese champions S.L. Benfica on a season-long loan from União de Leiria, and with a buyout clause, being assigned to the former's reserve team in LigaPro. He debuted for Benfica B against Académico de Viseu on 8 February. Later, on 31 May, União Leiria announced that he had signed a five-year contract with Benfica. On 6 July 2016, he was loaned out to Primeira Liga side C.D. Tondela for one season. He then returned to Benfica B in the following season.

On 2 September 2019, he signed a 3-year contract with the Russian Premier League club Krylia Sovetov Samara.

On 3 August 2020, he returned to Lokomotiv Moscow, signing a 4-year contract.

On 23 June 2021, he joined Akhmat Grozny on loan for the 2021–22 season. On 15 July 2022, Lystsov's contract with Lokomotiv was terminated by mutual consent.

On 23 February 2023, Lystsov signed for Russian Premier League side Khimki. On 1 July, he left the club, after his contract had expired.

On 14 September 2023, Lystsov returned to his former club União de Leiria, now competing in the Liga Portugal 2. He signed a one-year contract.

== Career statistics ==
As of match played 16 May 2026

Appearances and goals by club, season and competition
Club	Season	League			National cup (Note: Includes Taça de Portugal and Russian Cup.)		League cup		Continental		Total	
Club	Season	Division	Apps	Goals	Apps	Goals	Apps	Goals	Apps	Goals	Apps	Goals
Lokomotiv Moscow	2012–13	Russian Premier League	1	0	0	0	—		—		1	0
Lokomotiv Moscow	2013–14	Russian Premier League	0	0	0	0	—		—		0	0
União de Leiria	2014–15	Campeonato Nacional de Seniores	7	0	0	0	—		—		7	0
Benfica B (loan)	2014–15	Segunda Liga	14	0	—		—		—		14	0
Benfica B	2015–16	LigaPro	27	1	—		—		—		27	1
Benfica B	2017–18	LigaPro	21	3	—		—		—		21	3
Benfica B	2018–19	LigaPro	0	0	—		—		—		0	0
Benfica B	Total		62	4	—		—		—		62	4
Tondela (loan)	2016–17	Primeira Liga	6	1	1	0	0	0	—		7	1
Krylia Sovetov Samara	2019–20	Russian Premier League	8	1	1	0	—		—		9	1
Lokomotiv Moscow	2020–21	Russian Premier League	5	0	0	0	—		1 (Note: Appearance in UEFA Champions League)	0	6	0
Akhmat Grozny (loan)	2021–22	Russian Premier League	13	1	2	0	—		—		15	1
Khimki	2022–23	Russian Premier League	8	0	0	0	—		—		8	0
União de Leiria	2023–24	Liga Portugal 2	15	0	3	0	0	0	0	0	18	0
Boavista	2024–25	Primeira Liga	8	1	—		—		—		8	1
Shinnik Yaroslavl	2025–26	Russian First League	24	1	2	0	—		—		26	1
Career total			157	9	9	0	0	0	1	0	167	9
