= Aleksandr Mikhaylov (footballer) =

Russian footballer

Personal information
- Full name: Aleksandr Vitalyevich Mikhaylov
- Date of birth: 21 May 2000 (age 26)
- Place of birth: Rubtsovsk, Russia
- Height: 1.85 m (6 ft 1 in)
- Position: Defender

Senior career*
| Years | Team | Apps | (Gls) |
| 2015–2020 | FC Chertanovo Moscow | 17 | (0) |
| 2018–2019 | → FC Chertanovo-2 Moscow | 13 | (0) |
| 2020 | FC Veles Moscow | 1 | (0) |
| 2021 | FC Rodina Moscow | 0 | (0) |
| 2022–2023 | FC Rodina-2 Moscow | 0 | (0) |
| 2023–2024 | FC Dynamo Barnaul | 18 | (1) |

International career
| 2015–2016 | Russia U-16 | 9 | (0) |
| 2016 | Russia U-17 | 7 | (0) |
| 2017–2018 | Russia U-18 | 9 | (1) |
| 2018–2019 | Russia U-19 | 13 | (1) |
| 2019 | Russia U-20 | 1 | (0) |
- * Club domestic league appearances and goals

Aleksandr Vitalyevich Mikhaylov (Russian: Александр Витальевич Михайлов; born 21 May 2000) is a Russian former football player.

== Club career ==
He made his debut in the Russian Professional Football League for FC Chertanovo Moscow on 30 May 2016 in a game against FC Lokomotiv Liski. He made his Russian Football National League debut for Chertanovo on 24 November 2018 in a game against FC Krasnodar-2.
