= Nikita Chernov =

Russian footballer (born 1996)

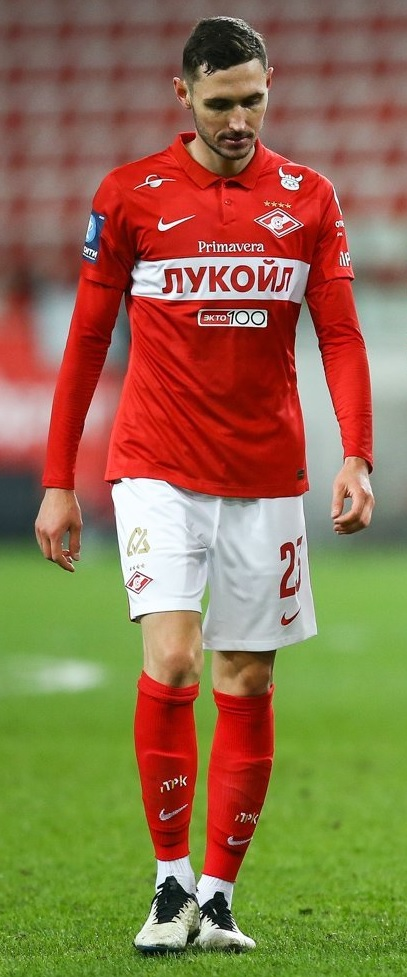
- Chernov playing for Spartak Moscow in 2022

Personal information
- Full name: Nikita Aleksandrovich Chernov
- Date of birth: 14 January 1996 (age 30)
- Place of birth: Volzhsky, Russia
- Height: 1.88 m (6 ft 2 in)
- Position: Centre-back

Team information
- Current team: Krylia Sovetov Samara
- Number: 23

Youth career
- Energiya Volzhsky
- 2009–2016: CSKA Moscow

Senior career*
Years	Team	Apps	(Gls)
2014–2019	CSKA Moscow	11	(0)
2016	→ Baltika Kaliningrad (loan)	0	(0)
2016–2017	→ Yenisey Krasnoyarsk (loan)	28	(0)
2017–2018	→ Ural Yekaterinburg (loan)	13	(0)
2019–2022	Krylia Sovetov Samara	67	(4)
2022–2026	Spartak Moscow	53	(0)
2025–2026	→ Krylia Sovetov Samara (loan)	16	(1)
2026–	Krylia Sovetov Samara	13	(2)

International career^{‡}
2011	Russia U-15	1	(0)
2011–2012	Russia U-16	17	(0)
2012–2013	Russia U-17	18	(2)
2014	Russia U-18	4	(2)
2014–2015	Russia U-19	10	(3)
2014–2018	Russia U-21	22	(1)
2015–	Russia	2	(0)
- * Club domestic league appearances and goals as of 20 November 2026 ‡ National team caps and goals as of 16 October 2018

Nikita Aleksandrovich Chernov (Russian: Никита Александрович Чернов; born 14 January 1996) is a Russian professional football player who plays as a centre-back for Krylia Sovetov Samara.

== Club career ==
Born in Volzhsky, Volgograd Oblast, Chernov began his career at hometown team FC Energiya Volzhsky before joining CSKA Moscow in 2009. He made his professional debut on 24 September 2014 in a Russian Cup game against FC Khimik Dzerzhinsk. He also played in the next Russian Cup round against FC Torpedo Moscow on 29 October.

On 30 July 2019, Chernov moved from CSKA Moscow to Krylia Sovetov Samara, where he played for two-and-a-half seasons.

On 4 February 2022, Chernov signed a 4-year contract with FC Spartak Moscow beginning in the summer of 2022. On 22 February 2022, Spartak and Krylia Sovetov agreed to make the transfer immediate instead. Chernov scored his first goal for Spartak on 23 November 2022 in a 1-2 cup defeat against Krylia Sovetov Samara.

On 7 August 2025, Chernov returned to Krylia Sovetov Samara on loan.

Chernov became a free agent as his contract with Spartak expired in June 2026.

On 18 June 2026, Chernov signed a new three-year contract with Krylia Sovetov Samara.

== International ==
He participated in the 2013 FIFA U-17 World Cup with Russia national under-17 football team.

On 30 May 2015, Chernov made his first senior appearance in the national team in a friendly against Belarus before he played a single game in the domestic league. Later on, he replaced Vasili Berezutski early in a European qualifier against Austria.

In July 2015, Chernov was part of the Russian under-19 team which came runners-up to Spain at the European Championship in Greece; he scored twice in a 4–1 semi-final victory over the hosts at the AEL FC Arena in Larissa.

After a break of 9 years, Chernov was called up to the senior team once again in May 2024 for a friendly against Belarus.

== Career statistics ==
=== Club ===
As of match played 20 November 2026

Appearances and goals by club, season and competition
Club	Season	League			Cup		Europe		Other		Total	
Club	Season	Division	Apps	Goals	Apps	Goals	Apps	Goals	Apps	Goals	Apps	Goals
CSKA Moscow	2014–15	Russian Premier League	0	0	2	0	0	0	0	0	2	0
CSKA Moscow	2015–16	Russian Premier League	0	0	1	0	0	0	—		1	0
CSKA Moscow	2017–18	Russian Premier League	0	0	—		0	0	—		0	0
CSKA Moscow	2018–19	Russian Premier League	11	0	0	0	5 (Note: Appearances in the UEFA Champions League)	0	1 (Note: Appearances in the Russian Super Cup)	0	17	0
CSKA Moscow	2019–20	Russian Premier League	0	0	—		—		—		0	0
CSKA Moscow	Total		11	0	3	0	5	0	1	0	20	0
Baltika Kaliningrad (loan)	2015–16	Russian First League	0	0	—		—		2 (Note: Appearances in the FNL Cup)	0	2	0
Yenisey Krasnoyarsk (loan)	2016–17	Russian First League	28	0	3	1	—		7 (Note: Two appearances in the promotion play-offs, five appearances, one goal in the FNL Cup)	1	38	2
Ural Yekaterinburg (loan)	2017–18	Russian Premier League	13	0	1	0	—		3	0	17	0
Ural-2 Yekaterinburg (loan)	2017–18	Russian Second League	2	0	—		—		—		2	0
Krylia Sovetov Samara	2019–20	Russian Premier League	23	1	0	0	—		—		23	1
Krylia Sovetov Samara	2020–21	Russian First League	30	2	7	1	—		—		37	3
Krylia Sovetov Samara	2021–22	Russian Premier League	14	1	2	0	—		—		16	1
Krylia Sovetov Samara	Total		67	4	9	1	—		—		76	5
Spartak Moscow	2021–22	Russian Premier League	4	0	3	0	—		—		7	0
Spartak Moscow	2022–23	Russian Premier League	24	0	8	1	—		1	0	33	1
Spartak Moscow	2023–24	Russian Premier League	17	0	12	0	—		—		29	0
Spartak Moscow	2024–25	Russian Premier League	8	0	3	0	—		—		11	0
Spartak Moscow	Total		53	0	26	1	—		1	0	80	1
Krylia Sovetov Samara (loan)	2025–26	Russian Premier League	16	1	8	1	—		—		24	2
Krylia Sovetov Samara	2026–27	Russian Premier League	13	2	1	0	—		—		14	2
Krylia Sovetov Samara	Club total		96	7	18	2	0	0	0	0	114	9
Career total			203	7	51	4	5	0	14	1	273	12

== Honours ==
CSKA Moscow

- Russian Super Cup: 2014, 2018.

Krylia Sovetov Samara

- Russian First League: 2020–21

Spartak Moscow

- Russian Cup: 2021–22
