= Dejan Radonjić (footballer, born 1990) =

German footballer

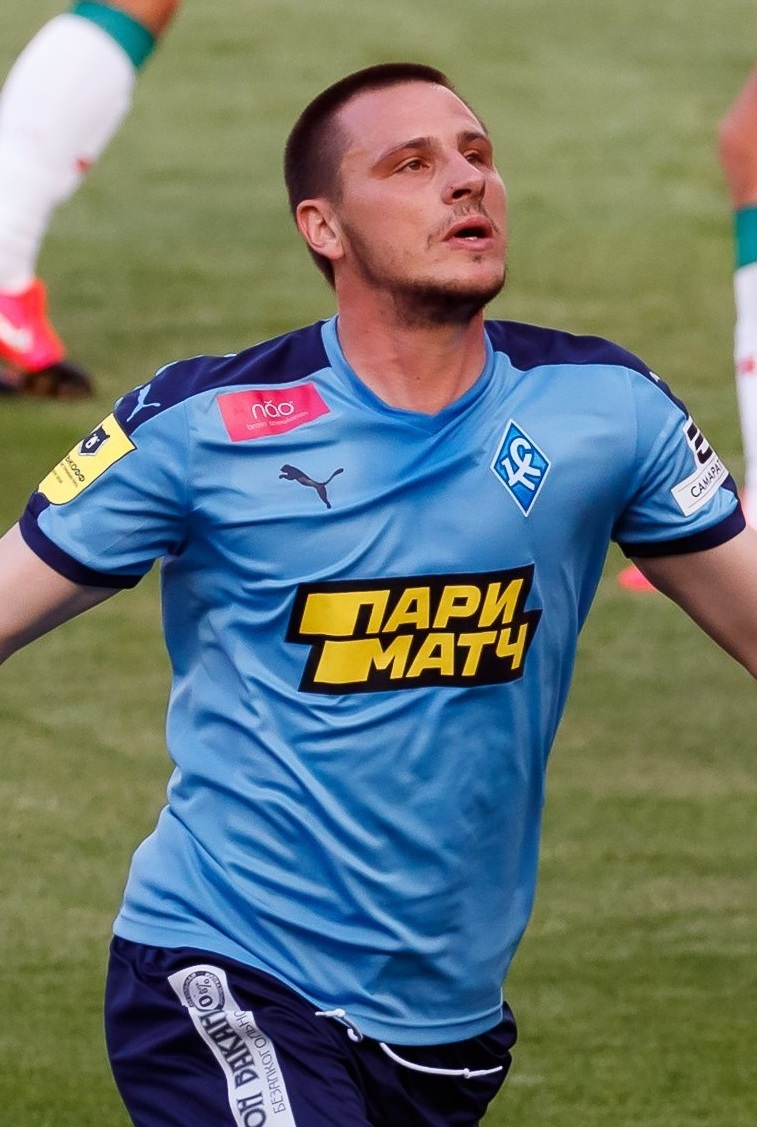
- Radonjić with Krylia Sovetov Samara in 2020

Personal information
- Date of birth: 23 July 1990 (age 36)
- Place of birth: Tettnang, West Germany
- Height: 1.90 m (6 ft 3 in)
- Position: Forward

Youth career
- 2004–2008: SSV Ulm 1846
- 2008–2009: Bayern Munich

Senior career*
Years	Team	Apps	(Gls)
2010	FV Ravensburg		
2010–2013	TSV Eriskirch		
2013	Zrinski Ozalj	25	(33)
2013–2014	Istra 1961	31	(9)
2014–2016	Dinamo Zagreb	2	(0)
2013–2014	→ Istra 1961 (loan)	23	(16)
2015	→ Maccabi Tel Aviv (loan)	3	(0)
2016	→ Hapoel Ra'anana (loan)	13	(2)
2016–2019	Lokomotiva Zagreb	65	(14)
2019–2020	Krylia Sovetov Samara	27	(4)
2020–2021	Qingdao FC	23	(1)
2022	Tianjin Jinmen Tiger	4	(1)
2022–2023	Anorthosis	10	(0)
2023	Šibenik	13	(0)
Total		239	(80)
- * Club domestic league appearances and goals

Dejan Radonjić (born 23 July 1990) is a German former professional footballer who played as a forward.

== Club career ==
Radonjić signed with Istra 1961 in the summer of 2013.

Radonjić transferred to Dinamo Zagreb for a fee of €500,000 after an impressive first season in Prva HNL. He made his debut for Dinamo Zagreb on 18 July 2014 in a 4–0 win against Slaven Belupo. On 4 August 2014, Dejan rejoined Istra 1961 on loan after failing to secure a spot in the starting eleven.

On 26 August 2015, Radonjić joined Israeli side Maccabi Tel Aviv on a one-year loan deal from Dinamo Zagreb a day after Maccabi qualified to the Champions League group stage. On 12 September, Radonjić made his debut against Ironi Kiryat Shmona.

After two seasons on loan at Lokomotiva Zagreb, Radonjić was moved there fully on a year-long contract.

On 26 June 2019, he joined Russian Premier League club PFC Krylia Sovetov Samara. On 26 August 2020, he terminated his contract with Krylia Sovetov by mutual consent. He subsequently signed for Chinese Super League club Qingdao FC.

On 29 April 2022, Radonjić signed with Chinese Super League club Tianjin Jinmen Tiger.

=== Anorthosis Famagusta ===
On 28 July 2022, Radonjić joined Anorthosis Famagusta FC of the Cypriot First Division on a one-year deal.

=== HNK Šibenik ===
On 1 February 2023, Radonjić returned to Croatia, signing a contract with Šibenik until the end of the season.

== Personal life ==
Born in Germany, Radonjić is of Croatian descent.

== Career statistics ==
Appearances and goals by club, season and competition
Club	Season	League			Cup		Continental		Other		Total	
Club	Season	Division	Apps	Goals	Apps	Goals	Apps	Goals	Apps	Goals	Apps	Goals
Istra 1961	2013–14	1. HNL	31	9	4	1	—		—		35	10
Dinamo Zagreb	2014–15	1. HNL	2	0	—		1	0	1	0	4	0
Istra 1961 (loan)	2014–15	1. HNL	23	16	1	0	—		—		24	16
Maccabi Tel Aviv (loan)	2015–16	Israeli Premier League	3	0	1	0	1	0	—		5	2
Hapoel Ra'anana (loan)	2015–16	Israeli Premier League	13	2	0	0	—		—		13	2
Lokomotiva Zagreb	2016–17	1. HNL	6	1	0	0	2	0	—		8	1
Lokomotiva Zagreb	2017–18	1. HNL	24	5	3	1	—		—		27	6
Lokomotiva Zagreb	2018–19	1. HNL	35	8	1	1	—		—		36	9
Lokomotiva Zagreb	Total		65	14	4	2	2	0	—		71	16
Krylia Sovetov Samara	2019–20	Russian Premier League	27	4	1	0	—		—		28	4
Qingdao Huanghai	2020	Chinese Super League	7	0	0	0	—		—		7	0
Qingdao Huanghai	2021	Chinese Super League	16	1	0	0	—		—		16	1
Qingdao Huanghai	Total		23	1	0	0	—		—		23	1
Tianjin Jinmen Tiger	2022	Chinese Super League	4	1	0	0	—		—		4	1
Anorthosis	2022–23	Cypriot First Division	10	0	1	1	—		—		11	1
Šibenik	2022–23	1. HNL	13	0	2	0	—		—		15	0
Career total			214	47	14	4	4	0	1	0	308	24
