= Ilya Viznovich =

Russian footballer

Personal information
- Full name: Ilya Vasilyevich Viznovich
- Date of birth: 10 February 1998 (age 28)
- Place of birth: Tolyatti, Russia
- Height: 1.82 m (6 ft 0 in)
- Position: Forward

Senior career*
Years	Team	Apps	(Gls)
2015	Lada-Togliatti	4	(0)
2015–2019	Krylia Sovetov Samara	3	(0)
2017–2018	→ Krylia Sovetov-2 Samara	19	(4)
2018–2019	→ Luch Vladivostok (loan)	29	(4)
2019–2021	Shinnik Yaroslavl	19	(0)
2020	→ Tom Tomsk (loan)	13	(2)
2021	→ Irtysh Omsk (loan)	13	(3)
2021	Metallurg Lipetsk	10	(1)
2022	Tver	12	(7)
2022–2023	Sokol Saratov	22	(2)
2023	Maxline Vitebsk	6	(0)
2024	Salyut Belgorod	25	(2)

International career^{‡}
2016	Russia U18	13	(2)
2016	Russia U19	3	(2)
2018	Russia U20	4	(0)
2019	Russia U21	1	(0)
- * Club domestic league appearances and goals as of 3 November 2024 ‡ National team caps and goals as of 5 June 2019

Ilya Vasilyevich Viznovich (Russian: Илья Васильевич Визнович; born 10 February 1998) is a Russian football player who plays as a centre-forward.

== Club career ==
He made his debut in the Russian Professional Football League for FC Lada-Togliatti on 18 April 2015 in a game against FC Chelyabinsk.

He made his Russian Premier League debut for FC Krylia Sovetov Samara on 11 May 2016 in a game against FC Krasnodar.
