= Agustín Rogel =

Uruguayan footballer (born 1997)

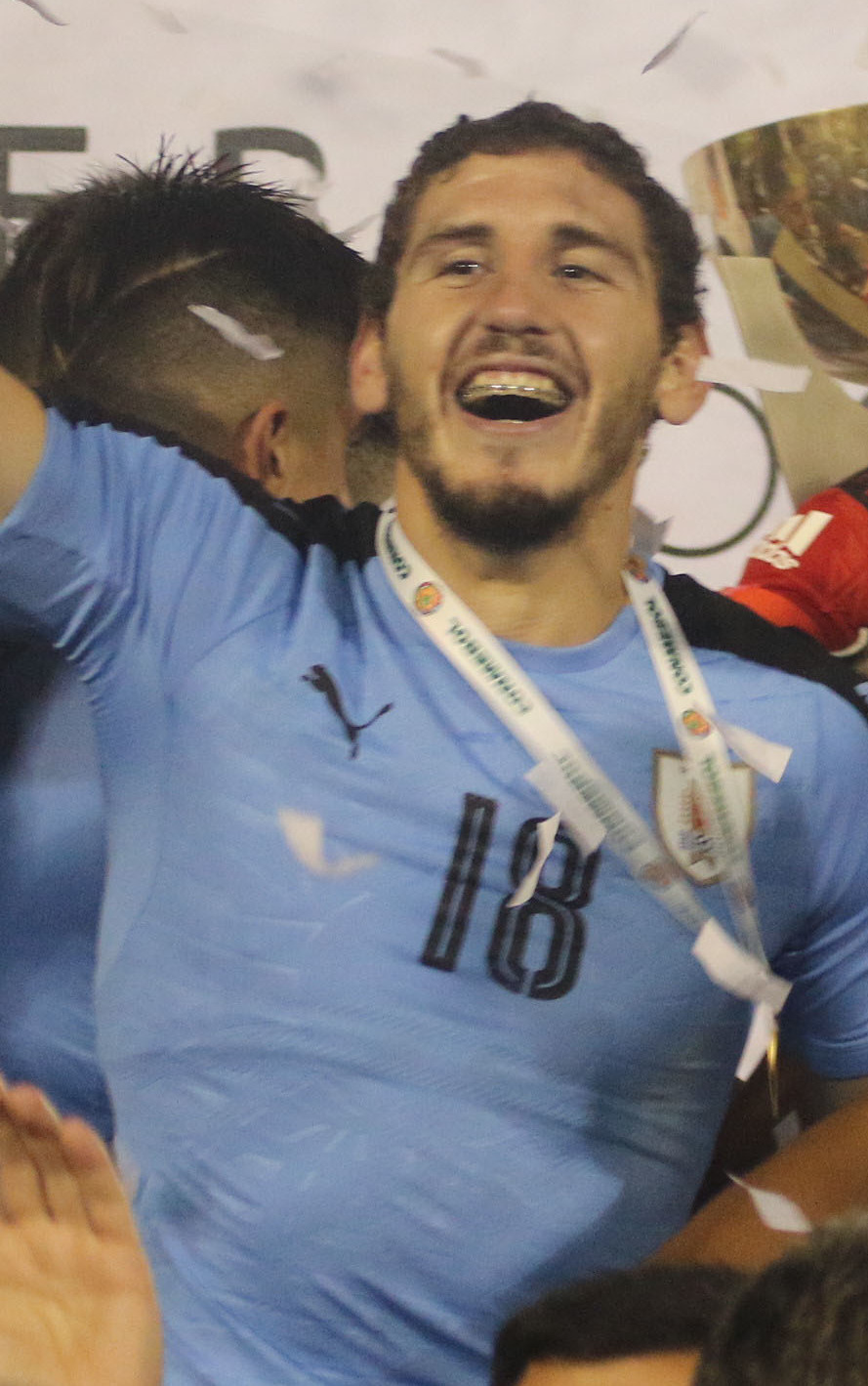
- Rogel with Uruguay U20 in 2017

Personal information
- Full name: Agustín Maximiliano Rogel Paita
- Date of birth: 17 October 1997 (age 29)
- Place of birth: Montevideo, Uruguay
- Height: 1.91 m (6 ft 3 in)
- Position: Centre-back

Team information
- Current team: Nacional

Youth career
- Deportivo Oriental
- Rincón Carrasco
- Nacional

Senior career*
Years	Team	Apps	(Gls)
2017–2018	Nacional	14	(2)
2018–2019	Krylia Sovetov Samara	14	(0)
2019–2022	Toulouse	10	(0)
2020	Toulouse B	2	(0)
2021	→ Estudiantes (loan)	34	(1)
2022	Estudiantes	24	(3)
2022–2026	Hertha BSC	21	(0)
2024	Hertha BSC II	4	(0)
2024–2025	→ Internacional (loan)	23	(1)
2026–	Nacional	0	(0)

International career^{‡}
2016–2017	Uruguay U20	18	(1)
2022–	Uruguay	1	(0)
Medal record
Men's football
Representing Uruguay
South American U-20 Championship
Winner	2017 Ecuador
- * Club domestic league appearances and goals as of 1 February 2026 ‡ National team caps and goals as of 2 October 2022

Agustín Maximiliano Rogel Paita (born 17 October 1997) is a Uruguayan professional footballer who plays as a centre-back for Nacional and the Uruguay national team.

== Club career ==
Rogel started his career at Nacional. After being involved in the first team in the 2015–16 pre-season, he picked up a meniscus injury which required an operation and ruled him out for six months. He made his debut for the first team as a substitute in the Copa Libertadores against Venezuelan side Zulia in a 1–0 defeat on 15 March 2016. He made his league debut in 2016. On 3 May 2018, Rogel's agent said that Rogel had rejected a contract offer from English side Leeds United.

On 30 August 2018, Rogel signed a four-year contract with Russian club Krylia Sovetov Samara.

On 19 July 2019, Rogel signed a four-year contract with French club Toulouse. On 19 February 2021, he moved to Argentine Primera División side Estudiantes de La Plata, on a loan deal until the end of the season. On 13 January 2022, his contract with his parent club Toulouse was terminated.

On 17 January 2022, Rogel returned to Estudiantes de La Plata on a one-year contract.

On 31 August 2022, Rogel joined Bundesliga club Hertha BSC on a four-year deal until June 2026. On 7 August 2024, he moved on loan to Internacional in Brazil until mid-2025.

On 4 February 2026, Hertha announced his return to Nacional.

== International career ==
Rogel is a former Uruguayan youth international. He was part of under-20 team which won the 2017 South American U-20 Championship.

In September 2022, Rogel was called up to the Uruguay national team for the first time. He made his debut on 23 September 2022 in a 1–0 defeat against Iran.

== Career statistics ==
=== International ===
As of match played 23 September 2022

Appearances and goals by national team and year
National team	Year	Apps	Goals
Uruguay	2022	1	0
Total		1	0

== Honours ==
Uruguay U20

- South American Youth Football Championship: 2017

Internacional

- Campeonato Gaúcho: 2025
