= Dmitri Kabutov =

Russian footballer

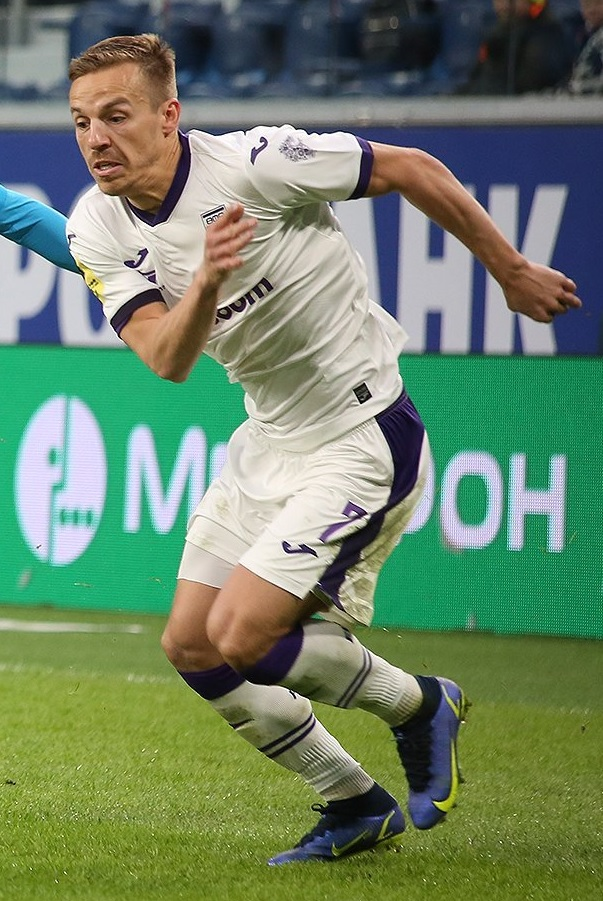
- Kabutov with Ufa in 2022

Personal information
- Full name: Dmitri Aliyevich Kabutov
- Date of birth: 26 March 1992 (age 34)
- Place of birth: Sokur, Russia
- Height: 1.73 m (5 ft 8 in)
- Position: Right-back

Team information
- Current team: Rubin Kazan
- Number: 70

Youth career
- Sokol Saratov
- Konoplyov football academy

Senior career*
Years	Team	Apps	(Gls)
2008–2009	Tolyatti-Reserves		
2010–2012	Akademiya Tolyatti	56	(9)
2012–2013	Salyut Belgorod	18	(1)
2013–2014	Rotor Volgograd	29	(4)
2014–2015	Gazovik Orenburg	40	(1)
2016	Luch-Energiya Vladivostok	12	(1)
2016–2017	Volgar Astrakhan	56	(5)
2018–2019	SKA-Khabarovsk	44	(4)
2019–2022	Krylia Sovetov Samara	73	(1)
2022	Ufa	11	(1)
2022–	Rubin Kazan	110	(8)

International career
2011	Russia U-19	3	(0)
2012	Russia U-21	1	(0)
- * Club domestic league appearances and goals as of 1 August 2026

Dmitri Aliyevich Kabutov (Russian: Дми́трий Али́евич Кабу́тов; born 26 March 1992) is a Russian professional football player who plays as a right back for Rubin Kazan.

== Club career ==
On 9 July 2019, Russian Premier League club Krylia Sovetov Samara confirmed that Kabutov will join the squad for the 2019–20 season. On 2 February 2022, Kabutov left Krylia Sovetov.

On 5 February 2022, Kabutov signed a contract with Ufa until the end of the 2021–22 season, with an option to extend.

== Personal life ==
His younger brother Ruslan Kabutov is also a football player.

== Career statistics ==
As of match played 28 October 2026

Appearances and goals by club, season and competition
Club	Season	League			Cup		Other		Total	
Club	Season	Division	Apps	Goals	Apps	Goals	Apps	Goals	Apps	Goals
Akademiya Tolyatti	2010	Russian Second League	19	5	0	0	—		19	5
Akademiya Tolyatti	2011–12	Russian Second League	37	4	1	0	—		38	4
Akademiya Tolyatti	Total		56	9	1	0	0	0	57	9
Salyut Belgorod	2012–13	Russian First League	18	1	2	0	—		20	1
Rotor Volgograd	2012–13	Russian First League	12	1	—		3 (Note: Appearances in the FNL Cup)	0	15	1
Rotor Volgograd	2013–14	Russian First League	17	3	3	0	—		20	3
Rotor Volgograd	Total		29	4	3	0	3	0	35	4
Gazovik Orenburg	2014–15	Russian First League	23	1	1	0	5	0	29	1
Gazovik Orenburg	2015–16	Russian First League	17	0	1	0	—		18	0
Gazovik Orenburg	Total		40	1	2	0	5	0	47	1
Luch-Energiya Vladivostok	2015–16	Russian First League	12	1	—		—		12	1
Volgar Astrakhan	2016–17	Russian First League	32	1	2	1	4	0	38	2
Volgar Astrakhan	2017–18	Russian First League	24	4	0	0	—		24	4
Volgar Astrakhan	Total		56	5	2	1	4	0	62	6
SKA-Khabarovsk	2017–18	Russian Premier League	7	0	1	0	—		8	0
SKA-Khabarovsk	2018–19	Russian First League	37	4	2	0	—		39	4
SKA-Khabarovsk	Total		44	4	3	0	0	0	47	4
Krylia Sovetov Samara	2019–20	Russian Premier League	28	0	1	0	—		29	0
Krylia Sovetov Samara	2020–21	Russian First League	37	1	7	1	—		44	2
Krylia Sovetov Samara	2021–22	Russian Premier League	8	0	2	0	—		10	0
Krylia Sovetov Samara	Total		73	1	10	1	0	0	83	2
Ufa	2021–22	Russian Premier League	11	1	—		2 (Note: Appearances in the relegation play-offs)	0	13	1
Rubin Kazan	2022–23	Russian First League	32	6	—		—		32	6
Rubin Kazan	2023–24	Russian Premier League	28	0	2	0	—		30	0
Rubin Kazan	2024–25	Russian Premier League	28	1	2	0	—		30	1
Rubin Kazan	2025–26	Russian Premier League	21	1	3	0	—		24	1
Rubin Kazan	2026–27	Russian Premier League	1	0	2	0	—		3	0
Rubin Kazan	Total		110	8	9	0	0	0	119	8
Career total			449	35	32	2	14	0	495	37
