= Vanja Vučićević =

Serbian footballer (born 1998)

Personal information
- Date of birth: 22 March 1998 (age 28)
- Place of birth: Belgrade, FR Yugoslavia
- Height: 1.88 m (6 ft 2 in)
- Position: Centre forward

Team information
- Current team: Rudar Pljevlja
- Number: 28

Youth career
- Dorćol
- OFK Beograd
- Čukarički
- Red Star Belgrade

Senior career*
Years	Team	Apps	(Gls)
2015–2016	Čukarički	0	(0)
2016–2018	Red Star Belgrade	2	(0)
2017	→ Borac Čačak (loan)	2	(0)
2018	→ Spartak Subotica (loan)	1	(0)
2018–2019	Krylia Sovetov Samara	3	(0)
2019	Sinđelić Beograd	10	(0)
2020–2021	Inđija	0	(0)
2021	Zvezdara	6	(1)
2022	Teleoptik	13	(5)
2022	Makedonija GP	6	(1)
2023	Bratstvo Gračanica	7	(1)
2023	Třinec	14	(1)
2024	Budućnost Dobanovci	14	(8)
2024–2025	Rudar Pljevlja	29	(15)
2025	Arsenal Tivat	10	(1)
2026–	Rudar Pljevlja	1	(0)

International career^{‡}
2014–2015	Serbia U17	2	(0)
2015	Serbia U18	5	(2)
2017	Serbia U19	2	(0)
- * Club domestic league appearances and goals as of 1 June 2026 ‡ National team caps and goals as of 18 May 2017

Vanja Vučićević (Serbian Cyrillic: Вања Вучићевић; born 22 March 1998) is a Serbian professional footballer who plays as a forward for Montenegrin club Rudar Pljevlja. He is the son of fellow footballer Nebojša Vučićević.

== Club career ==
=== Early years ===
Born in Belgrade, Vučičević was with Dorćol and OFK Beograd youth selections, before he a scholarship contract FK Čukarički. As the best Serbian youth league scorer, Vučićević was licensed for the 2015–16 Serbian SuperLiga season, but after he refused to sign a professional contract with club, he missed to play any official appearances with the first team.

=== Red Star Belgrade ===
In summer 2016, Vučićević signed his first four-year professional contract with Red Star Belgrade, but due to administrative problems he failed to play with new club until November same year. He passed the winter break-off season with senior squad, but later also played with reserves and youth team. He made his professional debut in 36 fixture of the 2016–17 Serbian SuperLiga season under coach Boško Gjurovski, replacing Srđan Plavšić in 71 minute of the match against Javor Ivanjica, played on 17 May 2017. Vučićević also started his first senior match on the field in last fixture match of the season, against Radnički Niš.

In August 2017, Vučićević moved on one-year loan deal to Borac Čačak. Vučićević suffered a metatarsal bone fracture during the training on 18 September 2017, after which he left out of the team until the end of a year. After the end of the first half-season in the domestic competition, a loan deal was mutually terminated and Vučićević returned to Red Star Belgrade. Next he moved to Spartak Subotica on deal for the rest of season, which was officially confirmed on 8 February 2018. While with Spartak, Vučićević made an appearance against Red Star on 5 May 2018, joining the game as a back-up for Ognjen Đuričin. Returning to Red Star Belgrade, Vučićević passed the first training with the club on 11 June 2018. Later, he was excluded for the summer pre-season after which it was announced he would leave Red Star. He mutually terminated the contract and officially left the club on 19 June 2018.

=== Krylia Sovetov Samara ===
On 25 August 2018, he signed a one-year contract with the Russian Premier League side PFC Krylia Sovetov Samara. He only made 3 league appearances for the senior squad, mostly playing for the Under-21 team.

=== Sinđelić Beograd ===
On 29 July 2019, he signed with the Serbian club FK Sinđelić Beograd.

== International career ==
Vučićević was a part of Serbia national under-17 football team until 2015. As a coach of Serbia national under-18 football team, Ivan Tomić called Vučićević into the squad in summer 2015. He played several matches until the end of same year, scoring goals in matches against Poland and Germany. He was also called into the Serbia U19 level in 2017.

== Style of play ==
In his early years, Vučićević mostly played as left winger. In a period while his father, Nebojša, trained him as a coach in OFK Beograd youth academy, he started using Vanja as a centre forward. After he converted his position on the field, Vučićević scored around 20 goals on average in each of the next several seasons in youth categories. Playing with youth team of FK Čukarički, Vučićević was the best scorer in the first half of the 2015–16 season in Serbian youth league with 16 goals, playing as a centre forward. Moving to Red Star Belgrade, Vučićević was usually used as a second striker in his first caps with the club.

== Career statistics ==
=== Club ===
As of 5 May 2018

Appearances and goals by club, season and competition
Club	Season	League			Cup		Continental		Other		Total	
Club	Season	Division	Apps	Goals	Apps	Goals	Apps	Goals	Apps	Goals	Apps	Goals
Čukarički	2015–16	SuperLiga	0	0	0	0	—		—		0	0
Red Star Belgrade	2016–17	SuperLiga	2	0	0	0	—		—		2	0
Red Star Belgrade	2017–18	SuperLiga	0	0	—		0	0	—		0	0
Red Star Belgrade	Total		2	0	0	0	0	0	—		2	0
Borac Čačak (loan)	2017–18	SuperLiga	2	0	0	0	—		—		2	0
Spartak Subotica (loan)	2017–18	SuperLiga	1	0	—		—		—		1	0
Career total			5	0	0	0	0	0	—		5	0
