= Srđan Mijailović =

Serbian footballer (born 1993)

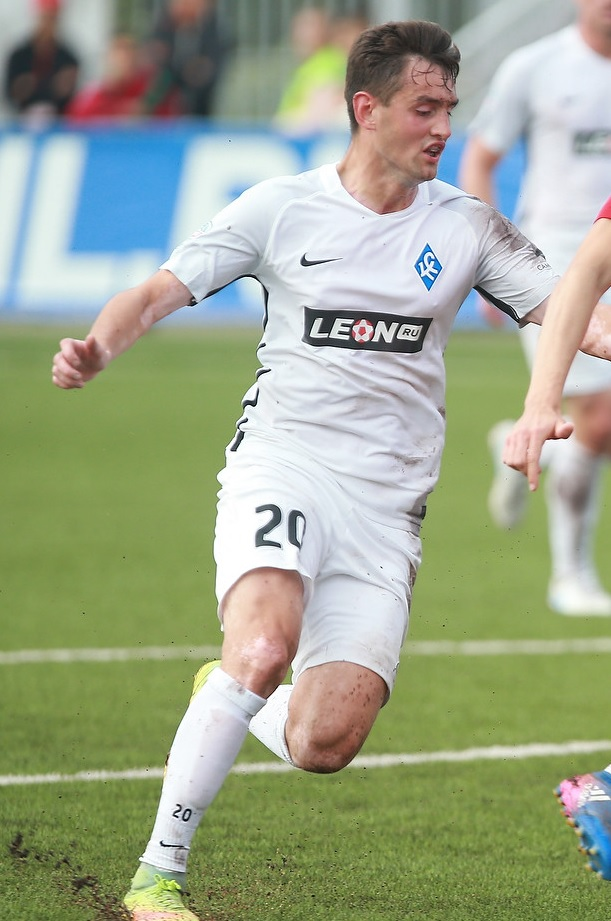
- Mijailović with Krylia Sovetov Samara in 2017

Personal information
- Full name: Srđan Mijailović
- Date of birth: 10 November 1993 (age 32)
- Place of birth: Požega, FR Yugoslavia
- Height: 1.78 m (5 ft 10 in)
- Position: Defensive midfielder

Team information
- Current team: Hapoel Ramat Gan
- Number: 22

Youth career
- Red Star Belgrade

Senior career*
Years	Team	Apps	(Gls)
2010–2013	Red Star Belgrade	52	(0)
2013–2017	Kayserispor	78	(1)
2017–2020	Krylia Sovetov Samara	67	(4)
2020–2022	Čukarički	55	(2)
2022–2024	Red Star Belgrade	55	(2)
2024–2025	Al Wasl	7	(0)
2025–2026	Čukarički	23	(0)
2026–	Hapoel Ramat Gan	10	(0)

International career^{‡}
2012–2024	Serbia	8	(0)
- * Club domestic league appearances and goals as of 9 November 2026 ‡ National team caps and goals as of 25 June 2024

Srđan Mijailović (Serbian Cyrillic: Срђан Мијаиловић; born 10 November 1993) is a Serbian professional footballer who plays as a defensive midfielder for Israeli club Hapoel Ramat Gan.

== Club career ==
Mijailović came through the youth academy of Red Star Belgrade and made his debut for the first team of the "red and whites" at the age of 17 in the 2010–11 season under coach Robert Prosinečki. In the spring of 2011, he played 13 matches, and in the 2011–12 season, he made 21 appearances for the team in the Serbian SuperLiga. His status at the club deteriorated in his last season, and his relegation was one of the reasons why he left in an unpopular way – by requesting to terminate his contract.

He played for Turkish club Kayserispor for three and a half seasons, making 78 league appearances and scoring one goal. On 8 February 2017, he signed a contract with Russian club Krylia Sovetov Samara. On 22 February 2019 Krylia Sovetov removed him from their roster. He was added back to Krylia's squad on 8 July 2019.

On 24 May 2020, Krylia Sovetov announced that his contract, set to expire on 31 May, would not be extended.

In late October 2020, Mijailović signed a contract with Čukarički. He returned to Red Star Belgrade at the end of the 2022 summer transfer window. He won two doubles with the club in the following two seasons. He left Red Star Belgrade on 6 August 2024 when he joined Al Wasl from the United Arab Emirates.

On 18 September 2025, Mijailović returned to Čukarički, signing a two-year contract.

== International career ==
On 31 May 2012, Mijailović debuted for Serbia in a friendly match against France at the age of 18.

Mijailović was selected in Serbia's squad for the UEFA Euro 2024. He played in a group stage match, against Denmark. Serbia finished fourth in the group.

== Honours ==
Red Star

- Serbian SuperLiga (2): 2022–23, 2023–24
- Serbian Cup (3): 2011–12, 2022–23, 2023–24
