= FC Krylia Sovetov-2 Samara =

Russian football club

Krylia Sovetov-2 Samara
- Full name: FC Krylia Sovetov-2 Samara
- Founded: 2000
- Ground: Metallurg Stadium
- Capacity: 30,251
- Chairman: Vadims Andreevs
- Manager: Nail Shabayev
- League: Russian Second League, Division B, Group 4
- 2026: 6th
- Website: pfcks.ru

FC Krylia Sovetov-2 Samara (Russian: ФК «Крылья Советов-2» (Самара)) is a Russian football team based in Samara. It is the farm club for FC Krylia Sovetov Samara. It played in the Russian Second Division in 2000. For 2017–18 season, it received the license for the third-tier Russian Professional Football League, with Konoplyov football academy alumni acting as the base for the squad. After the parent club was promoted back to the Russian Premier League for the 2018–19 season, Krylia Sovetov-2 dropped out of professional football. After Krylia Sovetov were relegated from RPL at the end of the 2019–20 season, Krylia Sovetov-2 were registered for PFL once more for the 2020–21 season. Following Krylia Sovetov's return to the top tier after one season, Krylia Sovetov-2 did not register for the 2021–22 PFL season.

On 21 February 2024, Krylia Sovetov-2 was licensed for the 2024 season of the Second League Division B.

== Current squad ==
As of 13 September 2026, according to the Second League website.

Note: Flags indicate national team as defined under FIFA eligibility rules; some limited exceptions apply. Players may hold more than one non-FIFA nationality.

No.	Pos.	Nation	Player
1	GK	RUS	Mikhail Nedospasov
16	GK	RUS	Arseny Osadchy
33	DF	RUS	Aleksey Lysov
35	DF	RUS	Arseny Abzalilov
39	GK	RUS	Yevgeny Frolov
40	DF	RUS	Nikita Beketov
43	DF	RUS	Aleksey Tsaryov
44	DF	RUS	Gleb Volkov
47	MF	RUS	Dmitry Yereskin
51	GK	RUS	Artyom Shishkin
54	DF	RUS	Yaroslav Melnikov
55	MF	RUS	Artyom Chaly
59	MF	RUS	Danila Savelyev
60	FW	RUS	Maksim Borisov
63	MF	RUS	Ivan Kovalchuk
66	DF	RUS	Ilya Kobylskov
69	MF	RUS	Valery Shepil
70	FW	RUS	Vladislav Vorobyov

No.	Pos.	Nation	Player
71	MF	RUS	Batyrby Chermit
73	MF	RUS	Shodibek Sharipov
74	MF	RUS	Vyacheslav Uryupin
75	DF	RUS	Dmitry Filippov
76	FW	RUS	Pyotr Salasin
78	MF	RUS	Denis Malikov
79	MF	RUS	Irlan Khugayev
81	MF	RUS	Matvey Garanin
82	MF	RUS	Andrey Suzdal
84	DF	RUS	Stanislav Politov
85	FW	RUS	Aleksey Belikov
86	MF	RUS	Samid Samedov
87	MF	RUS	Kirill Marulin
92	DF	RUS	Emin Eskerov
96	DF	RUS	Ivan Pelipenko
97	FW	RUS	Filipp Bodrov
98	FW	RUS	Nikolay Maksimov
