= 2014–15 FC Krylia Sovetov Samara season =

FC Krylia Sovetov Samara
2014–15 season
- Chairman: Vitaliy Shashkov
- Manager: Franky Vercauteren
- Stadium: Metallurg Stadion
- National Football League: 1st
- Russian Cup: Quarter-final vs CSKA Moscow
- National League Cup: 9th
- Top goalscorer: League: Adis Jahović (12); All: Denis Tkachuk (14)
Home colours	Away colours

The 2014–15 FC Krylia Sovetov Samara season was the club's first season back in the National Football League following their relegation in 2014. They also played in the Russian Cup.

== Squad ==
Note: Flags indicate national team as defined under FIFA eligibility rules; some limited exceptions apply. Players may hold more than one non-FIFA nationality.

No.	Pos.	Nation	Player
1	GK	RUS	Denis Vavilin
2	MF	BLR	Stanislaw Drahun
3	DF	BRA	Nadson
4	DF	RUS	Ivan Taranov
5	MF	RUS	Georgy Gabulov
6	DF	BRA	Bruno Teles
8	FW	BLR	Sergei Kornilenko
9	MF	RUS	Alan Chochiyev
11	MF	RUS	Emin Makhmudov
13	GK	RUS	Yevgeni Konyukhov
14	MF	RUS	Aleksandr Yeliseyev
15	DF	RUS	Ibragim Tsallagov
16	DF	BEL	Jeroen Simaeys
17	FW	RUS	Sergei Sipatov

No.	Pos.	Nation	Player
18	FW	MKD	Adis Jahović
20	MF	RUS	Aleksei Pomerko (on loan from Krasnodar)
25	MF	RUS	Denis Tkachuk
33	DF	RUS	Dmitri Yatchenko
40	DF	RUS	Sergei Bozhin
43	MF	RUS	Oleg Roganov
45	DF	RUS	Aleksei Kontsedalov
51	GK	RUS	Yevgeni Kobozev (on loan from Terek)
70	FW	RUS	Serder Serderov (on loan from Anzhi)
77	MF	RUS	Igor Gorbatenko
88	GK	RUS	Vitali Shilnikov
89	MF	RUS	Maksim Paliyenko
90	DF	RUS	Taras Burlak (on loan from Rubin)
92	DF	RUS	Sergei Obivalin

== Transfers ==
=== Summer ===
In: Note: Flags indicate national team as defined under FIFA eligibility rules; some limited exceptions apply. Players may hold more than one non-FIFA nationality.

No.	Pos.	Nation	Player
5	MF	RUS	Georgy Gabulov (from (Russia) Rostov)
16	DF	BEL	Jeroen Simaeys (from (Belgium) Genk)
18	FW	MKD	Adis Jahović (from (Croatia) Rijeka)
20	MF	RUS	Aleksei Pomerko (loan from (Russia) Krasnodar)
25	MF	RUS	Denis Tkachuk (from (Russia) Gazovik Orenburg)
51	GK	RUS	Yevgeni Kobozev (loan from (Russia) Terek Grozny)
90	DF	RUS	Taras Burlak (loan from (Russia) Rubin Kazan)

Out: Note: Flags indicate national team as defined under FIFA eligibility rules; some limited exceptions apply. Players may hold more than one non-FIFA nationality.

No.	Pos.	Nation	Player
5	DF	GEO	Aleksandr Amisulashvili (to (Azerbaijan) Inter Baku)
7	MF	RUS	Pyotr Nemov (to (Russia) Tom Tomsk)
9	FW	PAR	Luis Caballero (to (Mexico) Atlas)
11	MF	RUS	Aleksandr Pavlenko (to (Russia) Tosno)
18	DF	BLR	Dzmitry Verkhawtsow (to (Russia) Ufa)
20	MF	RUS	Igor Semshov (Retired)
21	MF	RUS	Ruslan Ajinjal (to (Russia) Krasnodar)
22	DF	HAI	Réginal Goreux (to (Russia) Rostov)
28	DF	GER	Felicio Brown (to (Russia) Ufa)
82	GK	BLR	Syarhey Vyeramko (loan to (Russia) Ufa)
84	MF	RUS	Roman Vorobyov (to (Russia) Dynamo St.Petersburg)
88	DF	RUS	Valeri Pochivalin (to (Russia) Syzran-2003 Syzran)

=== Winter ===
In: Note: Flags indicate national team as defined under FIFA eligibility rules; some limited exceptions apply. Players may hold more than one non-FIFA nationality.

No.	Pos.	Nation	Player
20	MF	RUS	Aleksei Pomerko (from (Russia) Krasnodar, previously on loan)
70	FW	RUS	Serder Serderov (loan from (Russia) Anzhi Makhachkala)
77	MF	RUS	Igor Gorbatenko (from (Russia) Shinnik Yaroslavl)

Out: Note: Flags indicate national team as defined under FIFA eligibility rules; some limited exceptions apply. Players may hold more than one non-FIFA nationality.

No.	Pos.	Nation	Player
10	FW	RUS	Artyom Delkin (loan to (Russia) Tyumen)
23	MF	RUS	Yevgeni Balyaikin
28	MF	RUS	Viktor Kuzmichyov
29	DF	RUS	Dmitri Golubev (to (Russia) Zenit-Izhevsk Izhevsk)
99	GK	SVK	Ján Mucha (loan to (Russia) Arsenal Tula)

== Friendlies ==
=== FNL Cup ===
Team	Pld	W	D	L	GF	GA	GD	Pts
Tyumen	5	1	2	2	1	5	−4	5
Krylia Sovetov	5	1	1	3	3	4	−1	4
Yenisey Krasnoyarsk	6	1	1	4	4	4	0	4
Sokol Saratov	4	1	0	3	3	3	0	3

13 February 2015 1	Krylia Sovetov	0–0	Tyumen	Belek, Turkey
11:15 MSK (UTC+3)	Sinyavsky (yellow card) 42'; Melikhov (yellow card) 80'	Summary	Abazov (yellow card) 40'; Ponomaryov (yellow card) 87'

15 February 2015 2	Sokol Saratov	3–1	Krylia Sovetov	Belek, Turkey
11:15 MSK (UTC+3)	Mullin 2'; Yakovlyev 74', 77'	[ Summary]	Zemskov 47'	Attendance: 10; Referee: Vladimir Moskalyov

17 February 2015 3	Krylia Sovetov	3–0	Yenisey Krasnoyarsk	Belek, Turkey
11:15 MSK (UTC+3)	Makhmudov 53' (pen.), 78' (pen.); Zemskov 87'	Summary		Referee: Alex Eskov

==== Final series ====
20 February 2015 Playoff	Krylia Sovetov	1–3	SKA-Energiya	Belek, Turkey
13:15 MSK (UTC+3)	Serderov 9'	Summary	Kozhanov 11'; Aladashvili 80' (pen.); Rukh 84'

== Competitions ==
=== Russian National Football League ===
==== Results by round ====
Round	1	2	3	4	5	6	7	8	9	10	11	12	13	14	15	16	17	18	19	20	21	22	23	24	25	26	27	28	29	30	31	32	33	34
Ground																																		
Result																																		
Position																																		

Updated to match(es) played on 21 OCtober 2015. Source: FNL
A = Away; H = Home; W = Win; D = Draw; L = Loss

==== Matches ====
6 July 2015 1	Krylia Sovetov	0–0	Khimik Dzerzhinsk	Samara
19:00 MSK (UTC+4)		Summary	Pashtov (yellow card) 42'; Shilov (yellow card) 69'	Stadium: Metallurg Stadium; Attendance: 7,359; Referee: Sergey Karasev

12 July 2014 2	Sokol Saratov	0–1	Krylia Sovetov	Saratov
19:00 MSK (UTC+4)		Summary	Kornilenko (yellow card) 71'; Chochiyev 90+4' (pen.)	Stadium: Lokomotiv Stadium; Attendance: 9,500; Referee: Sergey Kostevich

19 July 2014 3	Krylia Sovetov	2–1	Tom Tomsk	Samara
16:15 MSK (UTC+4)	Chochiyev 12' (pen.); Tkachuk 54'; Kontsedalov (yellow card) 61'	Summary	Pogrebnyak 90+2'	Stadium: Metallurg Stadium; Attendance: 5,655; Referee: Vitaly Meshkov

27 July 2014 4	Tosno	1–0	Krylia Sovetov	Tikhvin
16:15 MSK (UTC+4)	Gorelishvili 37'; Ponomaryov (yellow card) 41'	Summary	Yatchenko (yellow card) 22'; Kornilenko (yellow card) 90'	Stadium: Stadion Kirovets; Attendance: 3,000; Referee: Igor Fedotov

3 August 2014 5	Krylia Sovetov	2–1	Tyumen	Samara
18:00 MSK (UTC+4)	Drahun (yellow card) 13'; Kornilenko 15'; Teles (yellow card) 22'; Tkachuk 46'	Summary	Danilov (yellow card) 62'; Zarva 76'; Telenkov (yellow card) 90'	Stadium: Metallurg Stadium; Attendance: 6,920; Referee: German Kravchenko

10 August 2014 6	Sibir Novosibirsk	0–2	Krylia Sovetov	Novosibirsk
16:00 MSK (UTC+4)	Astafyev (yellow card) 31'; Vychodil (yellow card) 55'; Yedunov (yellow card) 89'	Summary	Gabulov 7'; Teles 41'	Stadium: Spartak Stadium; Attendance: 3,000; Referee: Vitaly Rushakov

17 August 2014 7	Krylia Sovetov	1–1	Shinnik Yaroslavl	Samara
19:00 MSK (UTC+4)	Tkachuk 41'	Summary	Samodin 3'	Stadium: Metallurg Stadium; Attendance: 6,740; Referee: Sergey Kulikov

24 August 2014 8	Anzhi Makhachkala	2–1	Krylia Sovetov	Kaspiysk
20:00 MSK (UTC+4)	Ewerton (yellow card) 52'; Aliyev 54'; Mitrishev 72'; Aravin (yellow card) 82'	Summary	Kornilenko (yellow card) 25'; Chochiyev 75'	Stadium: Anzhi-Arena; Attendance: 11,450; Referee: Aleksei Matyunin

7 September 2014 9	Krylia Sovetov	2–0	Baltika Kaliningrad	Samara
18:00 MSK (UTC+4)	Taranov 30'; Yatchenko (yellow card) 77'; Tkachuk 87'	Summary		Stadium: Metallurg Stadium; Attendance: 6,140; Referee: Timur Arslanbekov

13 September 2014 10	Volga Nizhny Novgorod	0–4	Krylia Sovetov	Nizhny Novgorod
16:00 MSK (UTC+4)	Minosyan (yellow card) 31'; Uridia (yellow card) 64'	Summary	Jahović 8', 72'; Chochiyev 40'; Tkachuk 55'; Pomerko (yellow card) 90'	Stadium: Lokomotiv Stadium; Attendance: 2,000; Referee: Kirill Levnikov

20 September 2014 11	Krylia Sovetov	1–1	Volgar Astrakhan	Samara
17:00 MSK (UTC+4)	Chochiyev (yellow card) 62'; Jahović 68'; Tsallagov (yellow card) 87'	Summary	Terehhov (yellow card) 27'; Bolov (yellow card) 85'; Verkashanskiy 90+2'	Stadium: Metallurg Stadium; Attendance: 5,390; Referee: Sergey Kostevich

29 September 2014 12	Gazovik Orenburg	0–1	Krylia Sovetov	Orenburg
14:00 MSK (UTC+4)	Malykh (yellow card) 8'; Akhmedov (yellow card) 38'; Afonin (yellow card) 45'; Appayev (yellow card) 76'; Andreyev (yellow card) 90'	Summary	Chochiyev 32'; Yatchenko (yellow card) 58'; Gabulov (yellow card) 64'	Stadium: Gazovik Stadium; Attendance: 3,000; Referee: Vladimir Seldyakov

5 October 2014 13	Krylia Sovetov	1–1	Dynamo St. Petersburg	Samara
14:00 MSK (UTC+4)	Jahović 23'; Pomerko (yellow card) 79'	Summary	Andreyev 40'; Petukhov (yellow card) 60'; Umarov (yellow card) 69'; Vorobyov (yellow card) 79'; Gadzhibekov (yellow card) 85'; Piskunov (yellow card) 86'	Stadium: Metallurg Stadium; Attendance: 4,380; Referee: Aleksei Matyunin

11 October 2014 14	Yenisey Krasnoyarsk	0–1	Krylia Sovetov	Krasnoyarsk
13:00 MSK (UTC+4)	Leshonok (yellow card) 58'; Marushchak (yellow card) 88'	Summary	Teles (yellow card) 6'; Tkachuk 44'; Pomerko (yellow card) 79'; Chochiyev (red card) 90'	Stadium: Central Stadium; Attendance: 2,100; Referee: Vladimir Moskalyov

19 October 2014 15	Krylia Sovetov	5–3	Sakhalin Yuzhno-Sakhalinsk	Samara
16:00 MSK (UTC+4)	Jahović 6', 37', 38'; Tkachuk 69', 79'	Summary	Gagloyev 11' (pen.); Alakhverdov (yellow card) 41'; Satalkin 62' (yellow card) 66'; Rudakov (yellow card) 78'; Arziani 90+2'	Stadium: Metallurg Stadium; Attendance: 3,831; Referee: Aleksey Eskov

25 October 2014 16	Krylia Sovetov	2–2	Luch-Energiya	Samara
16:00 MSK (UTC+4)	Yeliseyev 13'; Drahun (yellow card) 58'; Pomerko 86'	Summary	Tetrashvili (yellow card) 31'; Slavnov 60'; Prokofyev 63'; Dovbnya (yellow card) 90'	Stadium: Metallurg Stadium; Attendance: 2,568; Referee: Roman Chernov

2 November 2014 17	SKA-Energiya	1–0	Krylia Sovetov	Khabarovsk
7:00 MSK (UTC+3)	Ediyev (yellow card) 23'; Gaydash (yellow card) 63'; Rukhaia 71'; Agapov (yellow card) 75'	Summary	Jahović (yellow card) 75'	Stadium: Lenin Stadium; Attendance: 2,700; Referee: Anton Anopa

8 November 2014 18	Krylia Sovetov	2–1	Sokol Saratov	Samara
17:30 MSK (UTC+3)	Jahović 42' (yellow card) 90'; Gabulov (yellow card) 43'; Nadson (yellow card) 50'; Kornilenko 74'; Tkachuk (yellow card) 74'	Summary	Semyakin (yellow card) 7' (yellow-red card) 51'; Dutov (yellow card) 14'; Degtyaryov 27' (pen.) (yellow card) 44'; Korotayev (yellow card) 56'; Stolyarenko (yellow card) 62'; Molodtsov (yellow card) 67'; Markelov (yellow card) 90'	Stadium: Metallurg Stadium; Attendance: 3,480; Referee: Lasha Verulidze

14 November 2014 19	Tom Tomsk	1–0	Krylia Sovetov	Tomsk
15:30 MSK (UTC+3)	Bendz (yellow card) 62'; Golyshev 66'; Temnikov (yellow card) 81'	Summary	Teles (yellow card) 59'	Stadium: Trud Stadium; Attendance: 2,100; Referee: Vladimir Moskalyov

18 November 2014 20	Krylia Sovetov	0–2	Tosno	Samara
17:30 MSK (UTC+3)	Jahović (yellow card) 24'; Gabulov (yellow card) 28'; Teles (yellow card) 77'	Summary	Khadartsev 11', 57' (yellow card) 53'; Babyr (yellow card) 21'	Stadium: Metallurg Stadium; Attendance: 2,870; Referee: Sergey Kostevich

22 November 2014 21	Tyumen	0–1	Krylia Sovetov	Tyumen
13:00 MSK (UTC+3)	Korobka (yellow card) 87'	Summary	Kornilenko 51' (yellow card) 53'; Paliyenko (yellow card) 66'	Stadium: Geolog Stadium; Attendance: 1,050; Referee: Roman Galimov

14 March 2015 22	Krylia Sovetov	2–1	Sibir Novosibirsk	Samara
12:30 MSK (UTC+3)	Teles (yellow card) 13'; Tkachuk 39'; Chochiyev 53'; Jahović (yellow card) 90'	Summary	Dudolev 21'; Svezhov (yellow card) 25'; Gladyshev (yellow card) 46'; Ivanov (yellow card) 65'; Rogochiy (yellow card) 78'	Stadium: Metallurg Stadium; Attendance: 7,120; Referee: Vasiliy Kazartsev

18 March 2015 23	Shinnik Yaroslavl	0–0	Krylia Sovetov	Yaroslavl
19:00 MSK (UTC+3)	Rylov (yellow card) 41'; Malyarov (yellow card) 50'; Malyshev (yellow card) 90'	Summary	Chochiyev (yellow card) 50'	Stadium: Shinnik Stadium; Attendance: 2,500; Referee: Ivan Saraev

22 March 2015 24	Krylia Sovetov	1–0	Anzhi Makhachkala	Samara
17:00 MSK (UTC+3)	Pomerko (yellow card) 42'; Jahović 43' (yellow card) 58'; Konyukhov (yellow card) 90'	Summary	Moutari (yellow card) 38'	Stadium: Metallurg Stadium; Attendance: 9,870; Referee: Vladimir Moskalyov

29 March 2015 25	Baltika Kaliningrad	0–2	Krylia Sovetov	Kaliningrad
18:00 MSK (UTC+3)		Summary	Yatchenko 62'; Gorbatenko 69'	Stadium: Baltika Stadium; Attendance: 6,750; Referee: Vladislav Bezborodov

5 April 2015 26	Krylia Sovetov	1–0	Volga Nizhny Novgorod	Samara
15:30 MSK (UTC+3)	Drahun 52'	Summary	Buivolov (yellow card) 32'; Sarkisov (yellow card) 61'	Stadium: Metallurg Stadium; Attendance: 7,943; Referee: Roman Chernov

12 April 2015 27	Volgar Astrakhan	0–0	Krylya Sovetov	Astrakhan
14:00 MSK (UTC+3)	Terehhov (yellow card) 32'; Zhirov (yellow card) 88'	Summary		Stadium: Central Stadium; Attendance: 2,250; Referee: Aleksei Matyunin

19 April 2015 28	Krylya Sovetov	1–0	Gazovik Orenburg	Samara
13:00 MSK (UTC+3)	Nadson (yellow card) 78'; Jahović (yellow card) 84'; Kornilenko 90+1'	Summary		Stadium: Metallurg Stadium; Attendance: 8,722; Referee: Vitaly Meshkov

25 April 2015 29	Dynamo St. Petersburg	0–4	Krylya Sovetov	Saint Petersburg
18:30 MSK (UTC+3)	Petukhov (yellow card) 36'; Kazayev (yellow card) 45' (yellow-red card) 59'; Rogov (yellow card) 52'	Summary	Chochiyev 45' (pen.), 49'; Bozhin 53'; Drahun 83'	Stadium: Petrovsky Stadium; Attendance: 500; Referee: Timur Arslanbekov

3 May 2015 30	Krylya Sovetov	1–0	Yenisey Krasnoyarsk	Samara
15:00 MSK (UTC+3)	Jahović (yellow card) 39'; Drahun (yellow card) 41'; Gabulov 45+2'; Kornilenko (yellow card) 68'	Summary	Shabayev (yellow card) 70'; Skvortsov (yellow card) 76'	Stadium: Metallurg Stadium; Attendance: 10,182; Referee: Igor Fedotov

10 May 2015 31	Sakhalin Yuzhno-Sakhalinsk	0–3	Krylia Sovetov	Yuzhno-Sakhalinsk
8:00 MSK (UTC+3)		Summary	Tkachuk 31' (yellow card) 65'; Burlak 60'; Simaeys 79'; Pomerko (yellow card) 88'	Stadium: Spartak Stadium; Attendance: 2,300; Referee: Roman Chernov

16 May 2015 32	Luch-Energiya	0–5	Krylya Sovetov	Vladivostok
10:00 MSK (UTC+3)	Piskunov (yellow card) 26'; Zyuzin (yellow card) 29'; Myazin (yellow card) 36'; Nivaldo (yellow card) 39'	Summary	Jahović 19', 58', 71'; Tkachuk 21'; Gorbatenko 90'	Stadium: Dynamo Stadium; Attendance: 2,400; Referee: Vladimir Seldyakov

24 May 2015 33	Krylya Sovetov	1–0	SKA-Energiya	Samara
16:00 MSK (UTC+3)	Chochiyev 45'; Jahović (yellow card) 55'	Summary	Aladashvili (yellow card) 28'; Zamaliyev (yellow card) 71'; Popov (yellow card) 84'	Stadium: Metallurg Stadium; Attendance: 12,545; Referee: Artem Chistyakov

30 May 2015 34	Khimik Dzerzhinsk	0–3	Krylya Sovetov	Samara
16:00 MSK (UTC+3)	Chernov (yellow card) 50'; Stolbovoy (yellow card) 68'	Summary	Tsallagov 30'; Drahun (yellow card) 57'; Kornilenko 69', 89'; Teles (yellow card) 76'	Stadium: Metallurg Stadium; Attendance: 11,069; Referee: Roman Galimov

==== League table ====
Pos	Team	Pld	W	D	L	GF	GA	GD	Pts	Promotion or relegation
1	Krylia Sovetov Samara (P)	34	22	7	5	54	19	+35	73	Promotion to Premier League
2	Anzhi Makhachkala (P)	34	22	5	7	60	22	+38	71	Promotion to Premier League
3	Tosno	34	20	5	9	50	36	+14	65	Qualification for promotion play-offs
4	Tom Tomsk	34	18	10	6	57	34	+23	64	Qualification for promotion play-offs
5	Gazovik Orenburg	34	15	13	6	52	31	+21	58	

Source: FNL, Soccerway
Rules for classification: 1st points; 2nd matches won; 3rd head-to-head (points, matches won, goal difference, goals scored, away goals scored); 4th goal difference; 5th goals scored; 6th away goals scored
(P) Promoted

=== Russian Cup ===
30 August 2014 Fourth round	Astrakhan	1–4	Krylia Sovetov	Astrakhan
17:00 MSK (UTC+4)	Sergei Sechin 12'; Ururu (yellow card) 43'; Vasilyev (yellow card) 43'; Kaleutin (yellow card) 49'; Karlashchuk (yellow card) 76' (yellow-red card) 89'; Griban (yellow card) 90'	Summary	Tkachuk 9'; Nadson (yellow card) 10'; Delkin 25'; Kornilenko (yellow card) 49'; Chochiyev 55'; Tsallagov (yellow card) 57'; Konyukhov (red card) 85'; Yeliseyev 90'	Stadium: Sudostroitel Stadium

24 September 2014 Round of 32	Krylia Sovetov	3–1	Ural	Samara
19:00 MSK (UTC+4)	Tkachuk 18', 59'; Jahović 41'; Chochiyev (yellow card) 66'	Summary	Fidler (yellow card) 26'; Khozin (yellow card) 65'; Acevedo (yellow card) 80'; Manucharyan 90+2'	Stadium: Metallurg Stadion; Attendance: 5,670; Referee: Roman Galimov

30 October 2014 Round of 16	Krasnodar	1–3	Krylia Sovetov	Krasnodar
20:00 MSK (UTC+3)	Joãozinho (yellow card) 22'; Wánderson 71'; Mamayev (yellow card) 72'	Summary	Pomerko (yellow card) 22'; Yatchenko 47'; Chochiyev 47'; Tsallagov 88' (pen.)	Stadium: Kuban Stadium; Attendance: 4,250; Referee: Vitaly Rushakov

2 March 2015 Quarter-final	CSKA Moscow	1–0	Krylia Sovetov	Khimki
18:00 MSK (UTC+3)	Natcho 50'; Eremenko (yellow card) 64' (yellow-red card) 87'	Summary	Jahović (yellow card) 85'	Stadium: Rodina Stadium; Attendance: 4,000; Referee: Sergey Lapochkin

== Squad statistics ==
As of match played 30 May 2015

=== Appearances and goals ===
No.	Pos	Nat	Player	Total		Football League		Russian Cup	
No.	Pos	Nat	Player	Apps	Goals	Apps	Goals	Apps	Goals
1	GK	(Russia) RUS	Denis Vavilin	10	0	9	0	0+1	0
2	MF	(Belarus) BLR	Stanislaw Drahun	29	2	20+6	2	3	0
3	DF	(Brazil) BRA	Nadson	20	0	6+11	0	3	0
4	DF	(Russia) RUS	Ivan Taranov	22	1	18+1	1	3	0
5	MF	(Russia) RUS	Georgy Gabulov	29	2	25+1	2	3	0
6	DF	(Brazil) BRA	Bruno Teles	23	1	18+2	1	3	0
8	FW	(Belarus) BLR	Sergei Kornilenko	30	6	16+11	6	1+2	0
9	MF	(Russia) RUS	Alan Chochiyev	32	11	25+3	9	4	2
11	MF	(Russia) RUS	Emin Makhmudov	5	0	5	0	0	0
13	GK	(Russia) RUS	Yevgeni Konyukhov	27	0	25	0	2	0
14	MF	(Russia) RUS	Aleksandr Yeliseyev	20	2	8+10	1	0+2	1
15	DF	(Russia) RUS	Ibragim Tsallagov	37	2	33+1	1	3	1
16	DF	(Belgium) BEL	Jeroen Simaeys	14	1	5+7	1	1+1	0
17	FW	(Russia) RUS	Sergei Sipatov	3	0	0+3	0	0	0
18	FW	(North Macedonia) MKD	Adis Jahović	23	13	20	12	3	1
20	MF	(Russia) RUS	Aleksei Pomerko	23	1	11+10	1	2	0
25	MF	(Russia) RUS	Denis Tkachuk	33	14	28+1	11	4	3
33	DF	(Russia) RUS	Dmitri Yatchenko	32	2	24+5	1	2+1	1
40	DF	(Russia) RUS	Sergei Bozhin	19	1	12+5	1	0+2	0
45	DF	(Russia) RUS	Aleksei Kontsedalov	37	0	34	0	3	0
70	FW	(Russia) RUS	Serder Serderov	2	0	0+2	0	0	0
77	MF	(Russia) RUS	Igor Gorbatenko	13	2	8+4	2	0+1	0
89	MF	(Russia) RUS	Maksim Paliyenko	10	0	2+8	0	0	0
90	DF	(Russia) RUS	Taras Burlak	12	1	10+2	1	0	0
92	DF	(Russia) RUS	Sergei Obivalin	5	0	1+3	0	0+1	0
Players away from the club on loan:
10	FW	(Russia) RUS	Artyom Delkin	13	1	8+4	0	1	1
99	GK	(Slovakia) SVK	Ján Mucha	2	0	0	0	2	0
Players who appeared for Anzhi Makhachkala that left during the season:
7	MF	(Russia) RUS	Pyotr Nemov	4	0	2+2	0	0	0
23	MF	(Russia) RUS	Yevgeni Balyaikin	11	0	1+9	0	1	0

=== Goal scorers ===
Place	Position	Nation	Number	Name	Russian Football League	Russian Cup	Total
1	MF	(Russia)	25	Denis Tkachuk	11	3	14
2	FW	(North Macedonia)	18	Adis Jahović	12	1	13
3	MF	(Russia)	9	Alan Chochiyev	9	2	11
4	FW	(Belarus)	8	Sergei Kornilenko	6	0	6
5	MF	(Russia)	5	Georgy Gabulov	2	0	2
5	MF	(Russia)	77	Igor Gorbatenko	2	0	2
5	MF	(Belarus)	2	Stanislaw Drahun	2	0	2
5	MF	(Russia)	14	Aleksandr Yeliseyev	1	1	2
5	DF	(Russia)	33	Dmitri Yatchenko	1	1	2
5	DF	(Russia)	15	Ibragim Tsallagov	1	1	2
11	MF	(Russia)	20	Aleksei Pomerko	1	0	1
11	DF	(Brazil)	6	Bruno Teles	1	0	1
11	DF	(Russia)	4	Ivan Taranov	1	0	1
11	DF	(Russia)	40	Sergei Bozhin	1	0	1
11	DF	(Russia)	90	Taras Burlak	1	0	1
11	DF	(Belgium)	16	Jeroen Simaeys	1	0	1
11	FW	(Russia)	10	Artyom Delkin	0	1	1
				TOTALS	53	10	63

=== Disciplinary record ===
Number	Nation	Position	Name	Russian Football League		Russian Cup		Total	
Number	Nation	Position	Name	Yellow card	Red card	Yellow card	Red card	Yellow card	Red card
2	(Belarus)	MF	Stanislaw Drahun	4	0	0	0	4	0
3	(Brazil)	DF	Nadson	2	0	1	0	3	0
5	(Russia)	MF	Georgy Gabulov	3	0	0	0	3	0
6	(Brazil)	DF	Bruno Teles	6	0	0	0	6	0
8	(Belarus)	FW	Sergei Kornilenko	5	0	1	0	6	0
9	(Russia)	MF	Alan Chochiyev	2	1	1	0	3	1
13	(Russia)	GK	Yevgeni Konyukhov	1	0	0	1	1	1
15	(Russia)	DF	Ibragim Tsallagov	1	0	1	0	2	0
18	(North Macedonia)	FW	Adis Jahović	8	0	1	0	9	0
20	(Russia)	MF	Aleksei Pomerko	5	0	1	0	6	0
25	(Russia)	MF	Denis Tkachuk	2	0	0	0	2	0
33	(Russia)	DF	Dmitri Yatchenko	3	0	0	0	3	0
45	(Russia)	DF	Aleksei Kontsedalov	1	0	0	0	1	0
89	(Russia)	MF	Maksim Paliyenko	1	0	0	0	1	0
			TOTALS	44	1	6	1	50	2

== Notes ==
Notes

- MSK time changed from UTC+4 to UTC+3 permanently on 26 October 2014.
