= 2015–16 FC Krylia Sovetov Samara season =

FC Krylia Sovetov Samara
2015–16 season
- Chairman: Vitaliy Shashkov
- Manager: Franky Vercauteren
- Stadium: Metallurg Stadion
- Russian Premier League: 9th
- Russian Cup: Round of 16 vs Dynamo Moscow
- Top goalscorer: League: Two Players (4); All: Two Players (4)
Home colours	Away colours

The 2015–16 FC Krylia Sovetov Samara season was the club's 1st season back in the Russian Premier League, the highest tier of association football in Russia, since their relegation at the end of the 2013–14 season and 21st in total. Krylia Sovetov finished 9th in the league, whilst also reaching the 'Round of 16' in the Russian Cup.

== Squad ==
As of 31 August 2015

Note: Flags indicate national team as defined under FIFA eligibility rules; some limited exceptions apply. Players may hold more than one non-FIFA nationality.

No.	Pos.	Nation	Player
1	GK	RUS	Miroslav Lobantsev (on loan from Lokomotiv Moscow)
2	MF	BLR	Stanislaw Drahun
3	DF	RUS	Dmitri Yatchenko
4	DF	RUS	Ivan Taranov
5	MF	RUS	Georgy Gabulov
6	DF	BRA	Nadson
7	MF	FRA	Yohan Mollo (on loan from Saint-Étienne)
8	FW	BLR	Sergei Kornilenko
9	FW	FIN	Berat Sadik
10	MF	RUS	Alan Chochiyev
13	GK	RUS	Yevgeni Konyukhov
15	DF	RUS	Ibragim Tsallagov

No.	Pos.	Nation	Player
16	DF	BEL	Jeroen Simaeys
17	GK	GEO	Giorgi Loria
18	FW	MKD	Adis Jahović
19	DF	TTO	Sheldon Bateau (on loan from KV Mechelen)
20	MF	RUS	Aleksei Pomerko
27	MF	CIV	Junior Ahissan
33	DF	SRB	Milan Rodić
40	DF	RUS	Sergei Bozhin
45	DF	RUS	Aleksei Kontsedalov
77	MF	RUS	Igor Gorbatenko
90	DF	RUS	Taras Burlak (on loan from Rubin Kazan)
91	FW	RUS	Pavel Yakovlev (on loan from Spartak Moscow)

== Transfers ==
=== Summer ===
In: Note: Flags indicate national team as defined under FIFA eligibility rules; some limited exceptions apply. Players may hold more than one non-FIFA nationality.

No.	Pos.	Nation	Player
1	GK	RUS	Miroslav Lobantsev (on loan from (Russia) Lokomotiv Moscow)
7	MF	FRA	Yohan Mollo (on loan from (France) Saint-Étienne)
9	FW	FIN	Berat Sadik (from (Switzerland) Thun)
17	GK	GEO	Giorgi Loria (from (Greece) Olympiacos)
19	DF	TTO	Sheldon Bateau (on loan from (Belgium) Mechelen)
20	MF	RUS	Aleksei Pomerko (from (Russia) Krasnodar, previously on loan)
27	FW	CIV	Junior Ahissan (from (Ivory Coast) Ivoire Academie)
32	FW	CHI	Nicolás Canales (from (Azerbaijan) Neftchi Baku)
33	DF	SRB	Milan Rodić (from (Russia) Zenit Saint Petersburg)
39	FW	RUS	Nikita Podyachev (from (Russia) Lokomotiv Moscow)
44	DF	RUS	Semyon Biryukov (from (Russia) Krylia Sovetov-TsPF Samara)
55	MF	RUS	Andrei Kalinin (from (Russia) Krylia Sovetov-TsPF Samara)
61	MF	RUS	Nikolai Kiritsa (from (Russia) Krylia Sovetov-TsPF Samara)
66	MF	RUS	Saveliy Kozlov
67	MF	RUS	David Zakharyan (from (Russia) Krylia Sovetov-TsPF Samara)
69	FW	RUS	Yegor Golenkov (from (Russia) Akademiya-Lada-M Primorsky)
70	MF	RUS	Danila Popov (from (Russia) Akademiya-Lada-M Primorsky)
71	GK	RUS	Danila Yermakov (from (Russia) Krylia Sovetov-TsPF Samara)
80	MF	RUS	Leonid Afinogentov (from (Russia) Krylia Sovetov-TsPF Samara)
87	DF	RUS	Andrei Krasnov (from (Russia) Akademiya-Lada-M Primorsky)
89	DF	RUS	Vladislav Masalsky (from (Russia) Lada-Togliatti)
91	FW	RUS	Pavel Yakovlev (on loan from (Russia) Spartak Moscow)
96	DF	RUS	Kirill Mironov (from (Russia) FC Sibir-2 Novosibirsk)
97	MF	RUS	Daniil Melikhov (from (Russia) Krylia Sovetov-TsPF Samara)
98	FW	RUS	Ilya Viznovich (from (Russia) Lada-Togliatti)
99	DF	RUS	Aleksei Makushkin (from (Russia) Lada-Togliatti)

Out: Note: Flags indicate national team as defined under FIFA eligibility rules; some limited exceptions apply. Players may hold more than one non-FIFA nationality.

No.	Pos.	Nation	Player
1	GK	RUS	Denis Vavilin (to (Russia) Volga Nizhny Novgorod)
6	DF	BRA	Bruno Teles (to (Brazil) Vasco da Gama)
11	MF	RUS	Emin Makhmudov (on loan to (Russia) Mordovia Saransk)
14	MF	RUS	Aleksandr Yeliseyev (to (Russia) Volgar Astrakhan)
17	FW	RUS	Sergei Sipatov (released)
25	MF	RUS	Denis Tkachuk (to (Russia) Zenit Saint Petersburg)
51	GK	RUS	Yevgeni Kobozev (end of loan from (Russia) Terek Grozny)
70	FW	RUS	Serder Serderov (end of loan from (Russia) Anzhi Makhachkala)
89	MF	RUS	Maksim Paliyenko (to (Russia) Zenit Saint Petersburg)
92	DF	RUS	Sergei Obivalin (on loan to (Russia) Lada-Togliatti)
—	GK	SVK	Ján Mucha (to (Slovakia) Slovan Bratislava, previously on loan at (Russia) Arsenal Tula)
—	GK	RUS	Saveliy Tolstopyatov (to (Russia) Syzran-2003 Syzran, previously on loan)
—	GK	BLR	Syarhey Vyeramko (released, previously on loan at (Russia) Ufa)
—	DF	RUS	Valeri Pochivalin (to (Russia) Neftekhimik Nizhnekamsk, previously on loan at (Russia) Syzran-2003 Syzran)
—	DF	RUS	Pavel Vasilyev (to (Armenia) Mika, previously on loan to (Russia) Lada-Togliatti)
—	MF	RUS	Anton Bocharov (on loan to (Russia) Lada-Togliatti, previously on loan at (Russia) Syzran-2003 Syzran)
—	MF	ARM	Robert Darbinyan (released, previously on loan to (Armenia) Shirak)
—	FW	RUS	Artyom Delkin (to (Russia) Gazovik Orenburg, previously on loan at (Russia) Tyumen)

=== Winter ===
In: Note: Flags indicate national team as defined under FIFA eligibility rules; some limited exceptions apply. Players may hold more than one non-FIFA nationality.

No.	Pos.	Nation	Player
29	FW	BEL	Gianni Bruno (on loan from (France) Evian)
93	MF	RUS	Vitali Kalenkovich (from (Russia) Baltika Kaliningrad)
—	DF	RUS	Serob Grigoryan (end of loan to (Russia) Zenit Penza)

Out: Note: Flags indicate national team as defined under FIFA eligibility rules; some limited exceptions apply. Players may hold more than one non-FIFA nationality.

No.	Pos.	Nation	Player
2	MF	BLR	Stanislaw Drahun (to (Russia) Dynamo Moscow)
32	FW	CHI	Nicolás Canales (to (Azerbaijan) Neftchi Baku)
39	FW	RUS	Nikita Podyachev
77	MF	RUS	Igor Gorbatenko (on loan to (Russia) Arsenal Tula)
—	DF	RUS	Serob Grigoryan (to (Armenia) Pyunik)

== Competitions ==
=== Russian Premier League ===
==== Results by round ====
Round	1	2	3	4	5	6	7	8	9	10	11	12	13	14	15	16	17	18	19	20	21	22	23	24	25	26	27	28	29	30
Ground	A	H	A	H	A	H	A	H	A	H	A	H	A	H	A	A	H	A	H	A	H	A	H	A	H	A	H	A	H	H
Result	W	L	L	L	D	W	W	W	L	D	D	L	L	L	L	W	D	L	L	L	L	W	D	W	D	W	W	L	D	D
Position	5	8	9	10	11	9	7	5	6	7	8	8	9	10	12	11	11	12	12	12	12	12	12	10	10	10	9	9	9	9

Updated to match(es) played on 21 May 2016. Source: Russian Premier League
A = Away; H = Home; W = Win; D = Draw; L = Loss

==== Matches ====
19 July 2015 1	Anzhi Makhachkala	0 – 1	Krylia Sovetov	Kaspiysk
21:00 MSK (UTC+3)	Haruna (yellow card) 86'	Summary	Gabulov 51'; Pomerko (yellow card) 90+1'	Stadium: Anzhi Arena; Attendance: 15,200; Referee: Alexey Nikolaev

24 July 2015 2	Krylia Sovetov	0 – 2	CSKA Moscow	Samara
19:00 MSK (UTC+3)		Summary	Berezutski (yellow card) 55'; Tošić 64'; Natcho 71' (pen.) (yellow card) 76'; Strandberg (yellow card) 90+1'; Cauņa (yellow card) 90+2'	Stadium: Metallurg Stadium; Attendance: 23,316; Referee: Sergey Lapochkin

1 August 2015 3	Amkar Prem	1 – 0	Krylia Sovetov	Perm
14:00 MSK (UTC+3)	Belorukov 27'; Cherenchikov (yellow card) 65'; Dzhikiya (yellow card) 89'; Idowu (yellow card) 90+4'	Summary	Chochiyev (yellow card) 65'; Sadik (yellow card) 82'	Stadium: Zvezda Stadium; Attendance: 8,800; Referee: Sergey Kostevich

9 August 2015 4	Krylia Sovetov	0 – 2	Spartak Moscow	Samara
19:00 MSK (UTC+3)		Summary	Promes 5', 52'; Popov (yellow card) 51'; Rebrov (yellow card) 69'; Tasci (yellow card) 82'	Stadium: Metallurg Stadium; Attendance: 26,280; Referee: Kirill Levnikov

16 August 2015 5	Rostov	1 – 1	Krylia Sovetov	Rostov-on-Don
20:00 MSK (UTC+3)	Poloz 13' (pen.)	Summary	Taranov (yellow card) 12'; Gabulov 53'	Stadium: Olimp-2; Attendance: 13,057; Referee: Mikhail Vilkov

24 August 2015 6	Krylia Sovetov	3 – 0	Kuban Krasnodar	Samara
19:00 MSK (UTC+3)	Drahun 17', 71'; Kornilenko 47'	Summary	Xandão (yellow card) 19'; Šunjić (yellow card) 66'	Stadium: Metallurg Stadium; Attendance: 14,273; Referee: Sergey Karasev

29 August 2015 7	Zenit St.Petersburg	1 – 3	Krylia Sovetov	Saint Petersburg
17:00 MSK (UTC+3)	Nadson 49' (o.g.); Criscito (yellow card) 67'	Summary	Gabulov 17'; Taranov (yellow card) 27'; Pomerko (yellow card) 37'; Kornilenko 52', 56'; Konyukhov (yellow card) 70'	Stadium: Petrovsky Stadium; Attendance: 17,974; Referee: Igor Fedotov

14 September 2015 8	Krylia Sovetov	1 – 0	Mordovia Saransk	Samara
18:30 MSK (UTC+3)	Gabulov 30'; Nadson (yellow card) 52'	Summary	Stevanović (yellow card) 72'	Stadium: Metallurg Stadium; Attendance: 14,273; Referee: Sergey Karasev

20 September 2015 9	Lokomotiv Moscow	2 – 0	Krylya Sovetov	Moscow
19:30 MSK (UTC+3)	Ćorluka 54'; Niasse 87'; Samedov (yellow card) 90+3'	Summary	Pomerko (yellow card) 27'; Tsallagov (yellow card) 40'; Simaeys (yellow card) 76'	Stadium: Lokomotiv Stadium; Attendance: 8,747; Referee: Mikhail Vilkov

27 September 2015 10	Krylia Sovetov	0 – 0	Dynamo Moscow	Samara
13:30 MSK (UTC+3)	Gorbatenko (yellow card) 30'; Mollo (yellow card) 45' (yellow-red card) 83'	Summary	Kozlov (yellow card) 69'	Stadium: Metallurg Stadium; Attendance: 15,527; Referee: Sergey Kostevich

2 October 2015 11	Ural	1 – 1	Krylia Sovetov	Yekaterinburg
17:00 MSK (UTC+3)	Lungu 26'; Kulakov (yellow card) 68'	Summary	Tsallagov 44' (yellow card) 69'; Pomerko (yellow card) 90+2'	Stadium: SKB-Bank Arena; Attendance: 6,500; Referee: Kirill Levnikov

18 October 2015 12	Krylia Sovetov	0 – 2	Terek Grozny	Samara
16:00 MSK (UTC+3)		Summary	Utsiyev (yellow card) 49'; Adílson 88'; Mitrishev 90+7'	Stadium: Metallurg Stadium; Attendance: 10,800; Referee: Sergey Kulikov

23 October 2015 13	Ufa	1 – 0	Krylia Sovetov	Ufa
17:00 MSK (UTC+3)	Fomin (yellow card) 76'; Alikin 79'	Summary	Gabulov (yellow card) 68'; Jahović (yellow card) 78'; Burlak (yellow card) 82'	Stadium: Neftyanik Stadium; Attendance: 6,300; Referee: Aleksei Matyunin

1 November 2015 14	Krylia Sovetov	0 – 4	Krasnodar	Samara
14:00 MSK (UTC+3)		Summary	Mamayev 37', 77'; Smolov 61'; Ari 87'	Stadium: Metallurg Stadium; Attendance: 4,850; Referee: Sergey Ivanov

8 November 2015 15	Rubin Kazan	2 – 0	Krylia Sovetov	Kazan
14:30 MSK (UTC+3)	Karadeniz 38', 90+1'	Summary	Taranov (yellow card) 28'; Yatchenko (yellow card) 60'	Stadium: Kazan Arena; Attendance: 6,233; Referee: Vitaly Meshkov

21 November 2015 16	CSKA Moscow	0 – 2	Krylia Sovetov	Khimki
14:00 MSK (UTC+3)		Summary	Jahović 52', 66'; Simaeys (yellow card) 82'; Rodić (yellow card) 89'	Stadium: Arena Khimki; Attendance: 6,000; Referee: Mikhail Vilkov

28 November 2015 17	Krylia Sovetov	0 – 0	Amkar Prem	Samara
15:00 MSK (UTC+3)	Taranov (yellow card) 20'	Summary	Zanev (yellow card) 22'; Dzhikiya (yellow card) 90+3'	Stadium: Metallurg Stadium; Attendance: 4,089; Referee: Aleksei Matyunin

4 December 2015 18	Spartak Moscow	1 – 0	Krylia Sovetov	Moscow
19:00 MSK (UTC+3)	Promes 1'; Bocchetti (yellow card) 7'; Parshivlyuk (yellow card) 28'; Kutepov (yellow card) 36'; Rômulo (yellow card) 50'; Movsisyan (yellow card) 78'	Summary	Jahović (yellow card) 21'; Simaeys (yellow card) 39'	Stadium: Otkrytiye Arena; Attendance: 18,017; Referee: Vladimir Moskalyov

5 March 2016 19	Krylia Sovetov	0 – 1	Rostov	Samara
14:30 MSK (UTC+3)	Burlak (yellow card) 86'	Summary	Gațcan 29' (yellow card) 44'; Kudryashov (yellow card) 90+2'	Stadium: Metallurg Stadium; Attendance: 3,305; Referee: Vitaly Meshkov

11 March 2016 20	Kuban Krasnodar	2 – 0	Krylia Sovetov	Krasnodar
19:00 MSK (UTC+3)	Kleshchenko (yellow card) 6'; Seleznyov 47' (pen.); Bucur (yellow card) 74'; Karetnik 77'	Summary	Pomerko (yellow card) 37'; Burlak (yellow card) 45+2'; Taranov (yellow card) 73'; Bateau (yellow card) 77'	Stadium: Kuban Stadium; Attendance: 5,010; Referee: Sergey Karasev

20 March 2016 21	Krylia Sovetov	0 – 2	Zenit St.Petersburg	Samara
14:30 MSK (UTC+3)	Mollo (yellow card) 33'	Summary	Dzyuba 20'; Hulk 26' (pen.)	Stadium: Metallurg Stadium; Attendance: 5,320; Referee: Alexey Nikolaev

4 April 2016 22	Mordovia Saransk	1 – 2	Krylia Sovetov	Saransk
19:00 MSK (UTC+3)	Lutsenko 81'; Shitov (yellow card) 86'	Summary	Taranov 4'; Kornilenko 65'; Loria (yellow card) 90+1'	Stadium: Start Stadium; Attendance: 3,404; Referee: Igor Fedotov

11 April 2016 23	Krylia Sovetov	0 – 0	Lokomotiv Moscow	Samara
18:00 MSK (UTC+3)		Summary		Stadium: Metallurg Stadium; Attendance: 14,298; Referee: Vladimir Moskalyov

17 April 2016 24	Dynamo Moscow	0 – 1	Krylia Sovetov	Khimki
17:00 MSK (UTC+3)		Summary	Bruno 90+4'	Stadium: Arena Khimki; Attendance: 4,332; Referee: Vladislav Bezborodov

23 April 2016 25	Krylia Sovetov	1 – 1	Ural	Samara
14:30 MSK (UTC+3)	Rodić 78' (yellow card) 79'	Summary	Sapeta 12'; Yemelyanov (yellow card) 37'	Stadium: Metallurg Stadium; Attendance: 5,164; Referee: Aleksandr Egorov

1 May 2016 26	Terek Grozny	0 – 1	Krylia Sovetov	Grozny
17:00 MSK (UTC+3)	Utsiyev (yellow card) 41'; Rodolfo (yellow card) 67'	Summary	Pomerko (yellow card) 49'; Jahović 64' (yellow card) 64'; Rodić (yellow card) 68'	Stadium: Akhmat-Arena; Attendance: 12,700; Referee: Vitaly Meshkov

6 May 2016 27	Krylia Sovetov	1 – 0	Ufa	Samara
18:00 MSK (UTC+3)	Yakovlev 6' (yellow card) 52'; Taranov (yellow card) 51'; Nadson (yellow card) 72'	Summary	Krotov (yellow card) 29'; Krotov (yellow card) 55'	Stadium: Metallurg Stadium; Attendance: 10,087; Referee: Vladislav Bezborodov

11 May 2016 28	Krasnodar	3 – 0	Krylia Sovetov	Krasnodar
19:30 MSK (UTC+3)	Smolov 18', 47', 67'	Summary	Burlak (yellow card) 44'	Stadium: Kuban Stadium; Attendance: 5,950; Referee: Kirill Levnikov

15 May 2016 29	Krylia Sovetov	1 – 1	Rubin Kazan	Samara
14:30 MSK (UTC+3)	Bruno 52'	Summary	Kambolov (yellow card) 19'; Caktaš 89' (pen.)	Stadium: Metallurg Stadium; Attendance: 6,733; Referee: Vladimir Seldyakov

21 May 2016 30	Krylia Sovetov	0 – 0	Anzhi Makhachkala	Samara
13:30 MSK (UTC+3)	Yatchenko (yellow card) 25'; Tsallagov (yellow card) 85'	Summary	Mayewski (yellow card) 69'; Abdulavov (yellow card) 85'	Stadium: Metallurg Stadium; Attendance: 7,693; Referee: Sergey Karasev

==== League table ====
Pos	Team	Pld	W	D	L	GF	GA	GD	Pts
7	Terek Grozny	30	11	11	8	35	30	+5	44
8	Ural Sverdlovsk Oblast	30	10	9	11	39	46	−7	39
9	Krylia Sovetov Samara	30	9	8	13	19	31	−12	35
10	Rubin Kazan	30	9	6	15	33	39	−6	33
11	Amkar Perm	30	7	10	13	22	33	−11	31

Source: Russian Premier League, Soccerway
Rules for classification: 1) Points; 2) Matches won; 3) Head-to-head points; 4) Head-to-head matches won; 5) Head-to-head goal difference; 6) Head-to-head goals scored; 7) Head-to-head away goals; 8) Goal difference; 9) Goals scored; 10) Away goals scored.

=== Russian Cup ===
23 September 2015 Round of 32	Tambov	2 – 3	Krylia Sovetov	Tambov
15:00 MSK (UTC+3)	Chernyshov 5' (yellow card) 17'; Chasovskikh 45+2'; Mikhalyov (yellow card) 58'	Summary	Chochiyev 15'; Rodić (yellow card) 47' (goal) 57'; Simaeys (yellow card) 82'; Tsallagov 85'	Stadium: Central Stadium; Attendance: 7,000; Referee: Oleg Sokolov

29 October 2015 Round of 16	Krylia Sovetov	0 – 1	Dynamo Moscow	Samara
18:00 MSK (UTC+3)	Gabulov (yellow card) 42'; Jahović (yellow card) 72' (yellow-red card) 75'	Summary	Tashayev 87'	Stadium: Metallurg Stadium; Attendance: 4,951; Referee: Aleksandr Egorov

== Squad statistics ==
As of Match played 21 May 2016

=== Appearances and goals ===
No.	Pos	Nat	Player	Total		Premier League		Russian Cup	
No.	Pos	Nat	Player	Apps	Goals	Apps	Goals	Apps	Goals
1	GK	(Russia) RUS	Miroslav Lobantsev	2	0	0+1	0	1	0
3	DF	(Russia) RUS	Dmitri Yatchenko	19	0	12+6	0	1	0
4	DF	(Russia) RUS	Ivan Taranov	27	1	26	1	1	0
5	MF	(Russia) RUS	Georgy Gabulov	23	4	21+1	4	1	0
6	DF	(Brazil) BRA	Nadson	27	0	24+1	0	2	0
7	MF	(France) FRA	Yohan Mollo	25	0	22+1	0	1+1	0
8	FW	(Belarus) BLR	Sergei Kornilenko	17	4	12+4	4	0+1	0
9	FW	(Finland) FIN	Berat Sadik	12	0	4+7	0	0+1	0
10	MF	(Russia) RUS	Alan Chochiyev	20	1	12+7	0	1	1
13	GK	(Russia) RUS	Yevgeni Konyukhov	16	0	16	0	0	0
15	DF	(Russia) RUS	Ibragim Tsallagov	32	2	30	1	2	1
16	DF	(Belgium) BEL	Jeroen Simaeys	25	0	14+9	0	1+1	0
17	GK	(Georgia (country)) GEO	Giorgi Loria	15	0	14	0	1	0
18	FW	(North Macedonia) MKD	Adis Jahović	17	3	12+4	3	1	0
19	DF	(Trinidad and Tobago) TTO	Sheldon Bateau	19	0	9+9	0	1	0
20	MF	(Russia) RUS	Aleksei Pomerko	29	0	27	0	2	0
29	FW	(Belgium) BEL	Gianni Bruno	11	2	8+3	2	0	0
33	DF	(Serbia) SRB	Milan Rodić	17	2	10+6	1	1	1
45	DF	(Russia) RUS	Aleksei Kontsedalov	12	0	10+2	0	0	0
90	DF	(Russia) RUS	Taras Burlak	30	0	28	0	2	0
91	FW	(Russia) RUS	Pavel Yakovlev	14	1	6+6	1	1+1	0
98	FW	(Russia) RUS	Ilya Viznovich	1	0	0+1	0	0	0
Players away from the club on loan:
11	MF	(Russia) RUS	Emin Makhmudov	1	0	0+1	0	0	0
77	MF	(Russia) RUS	Igor Gorbatenko	9	0	1+7	0	1	0
Players who appeared for Krylia Sovetov no longer at the club:
2	MF	(Belarus) BLR	Stanislaw Drahun	16	2	12+2	2	1+1	0

=== Goal scorers ===
Place	Position	Nation	Number	Name	Russian Premier League	Russian Cup	Total
1	MF	(Russia)	5	Georgy Gabulov	4	0	4
1	FW	(Belarus)	8	Sergei Kornilenko	4	0	4
3	FW	(North Macedonia)	18	Adis Jahović	3	0	3
4	MF	(Belarus)	2	Stanislaw Drahun	2	0	2
4	FW	(Belgium)	29	Gianni Bruno	2	0	2
4	DF	(Russia)	15	Ibragim Tsallagov	1	1	2
4	DF	(Serbia)	33	Milan Rodić	1	1	2
8	FW	(Russia)	91	Pavel Yakovlev	1	0	1
8	DF	(Russia)	4	Ivan Taranov	0	1	1
8	MF	(Russia)	10	Alan Chochiyev	0	1	1
				TOTALS	19	3	22

=== Disciplinary record ===
Number	Nation	Position	Name	Russian Premier League		Russian Cup		Total	
Number	Nation	Position	Name	Yellow card	Red card	Yellow card	Red card	Yellow card	Red card
3	(Russia)	DF	Dmitri Yatchenko	2	0	0	0	2	0
4	(Russia)	DF	Ivan Taranov	6	0	0	0	6	0
5	(Russia)	MF	Georgy Gabulov	1	0	1	0	2	0
6	(Brazil)	DF	Nadson	2	0	0	0	2	0
7	(France)	MF	Yohan Mollo	3	1	0	0	3	1
9	(Finland)	FW	Berat Sadik	1	0	0	0	1	0
10	(Russia)	MF	Alan Chochiyev	1	0	0	0	1	0
13	(Russia)	GK	Yevgeni Konyukhov	1	0	0	0	1	0
15	(Russia)	DF	Ibragim Tsallagov	3	0	0	0	3	0
16	(Belgium)	DF	Jeroen Simaeys	3	0	1	0	4	0
17	(Georgia (country))	GK	Giorgi Loria	1	0	0	0	1	0
18	(North Macedonia)	FW	Adis Jahović	3	0	2	1	5	1
19	(Trinidad and Tobago)	DF	Sheldon Bateau	1	0	0	0	1	0
20	(Russia)	MF	Aleksei Pomerko	6	0	0	0	6	0
33	(Serbia)	DF	Milan Rodić	3	0	1	0	4	0
77	(Russia)	MF	Igor Gorbatenko	1	0	0	0	1	0
90	(Russia)	DF	Taras Burlak	4	0	0	0	4	0
91	(Russia)	FW	Pavel Yakovlev	1	0	0	0	1	0
			TOTALS	43	1	5	1	48	2
