= Igor Gorbatenko =

Russian footballer

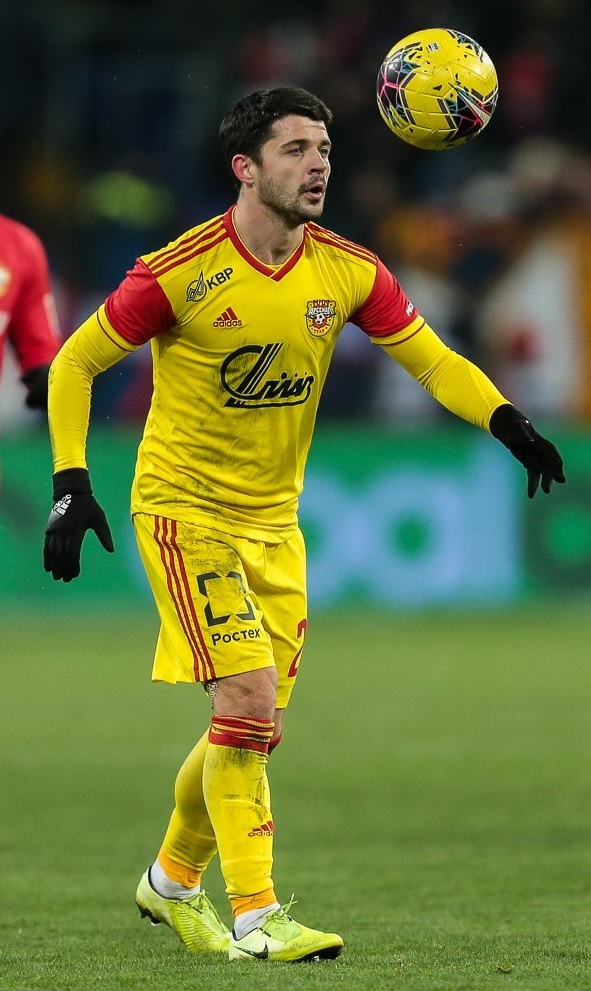
- Gorbatenko with Arsenal Tula in 2019

Personal information
- Full name: Igor Nikolayevich Gorbatenko
- Date of birth: 13 February 1989 (age 37)
- Place of birth: Belgorod, Russian SFSR
- Height: 1.70 m (5 ft 7 in)
- Position: Midfielder

Youth career
- Raduga Belgorod
- Konoplyov football academy

Senior career*
Years	Team	Apps	(Gls)
2006–2007	FC Krylia Sovetov-SOK Dimitrovgrad	41	(7)
2008–2012	FC Spartak Moscow	6	(0)
2010	→ FC Ural Sverdlovsk Oblast (loan)	25	(1)
2011	→ FC Dynamo Bryansk (loan)	7	(1)
2011–2012	→ FC Ural Sverdlovsk Oblast (loan)	17	(0)
2013–2014	FC Shinnik Yaroslavl	38	(10)
2015–2016	FC Krylia Sovetov Samara	20	(2)
2016	→ FC Arsenal Tula (loan)	14	(2)
2016–2022	FC Arsenal Tula	113	(7)

International career
2005–2006	Russia U-17	9	(2)
2007–2008	Russia U-19	8	(2)
2009–2010	Russia U-21	10	(2)
- * Club domestic league appearances and goals

Igor Nikolayevich Gorbatenko (Russian: Игорь Николаевич Горбатенко; born 13 February 1989) is a Russian former professional footballer who played as an attacking midfielder or left midfielder.

== Club career ==
He made his professional debut in the Russian Second Division in 2006 for FC Krylia Sovetov-SOK Dimitrovgrad.

In January 2015, Gorbatenko signed for FC Krylia Sovetov Samara, on an 18-month contract.

== International career ==
Gorbatenko was one of the stars of the Russian U-17 squad that won the 2006 UEFA U-17 Championship. He was a part of the Russia U-21 side that was competing in the 2011 European Under-21 Championship qualification.

== Career statistics ==
=== Club ===
As of 11 December 2021

Club	Season	League			Cup		Continental		Other		Total	
Club	Season	Division	Apps	Goals	Apps	Goals	Apps	Goals	Apps	Goals	Apps	Goals
Krylia Sovetov-SOK	2006	PFL	20	2	0	0	–		–		20	2
Krylia Sovetov-SOK	2007	PFL	21	5	0	0	–		–		21	5
Krylia Sovetov-SOK	Total		41	7	0	0	0	0	0	0	41	7
Spartak Moscow	2009	RPL	2	0	0	0	–		–		2	0
Spartak Moscow	2012–13	RPL	4	0	1	0	0	0	–		5	0
Spartak Moscow	Total		6	0	1	0	0	0	0	0	7	0
Ural Yekaterinburg (loan)	2010	FNL	25	1	1	0	–		–		26	1
Dynamo Bryansk (loan)	2011–12	FNL	7	1	0	0	–		–		7	1
Ural Yekaterinburg (loan)	2011–12	FNL	17	0	–		–		–		17	0
Ural Yekaterinburg (loan)	Total (2 spells)		42	1	1	0	0	0	0	0	43	1
Shinnik Yaroslavl	2013–14	FNL	17	4	1	1	–		3 (Note: Appearances in the FNL Cup)	0	21	5
Shinnik Yaroslavl	2014–15	FNL	21	6	3	0	–		–		24	6
Shinnik Yaroslavl	Total		38	10	4	1	0	0	3	0	45	11
Krylia Sovetov Samara	2014–15	FNL	12	2	1	0	–		–		13	2
Krylia Sovetov Samara	2015–16	RPL	8	0	1	0	–		–		9	0
Krylia Sovetov Samara	Total		20	2	2	0	0	0	0	0	22	2
Arsenal Tula	2015–16	FNL	14	2	–		–		–		14	2
Arsenal Tula	2016–17	RPL	23	0	1	0	–		2 (Note: Appearances in the relegation play-offs)	0	26	0
Arsenal Tula	2017–18	RPL	24	3	1	0	–		–		25	3
Arsenal Tula	2018–19	RPL	28	3	6	0	–		–		34	3
Arsenal Tula	2019–20	RPL	24	1	2	0	2 (Note: Appearances in the UEFA Europa League)	0	–		28	1
Arsenal Tula	2020–21	RPL	14	0	2	0	–		–		16	0
Arsenal Tula	2021–22	RPL	0	0	0	0	–		–		0	0
Arsenal Tula	Total		127	9	12	0	2	0	2	0	143	9
Career total			281	30	20	1	2	0	5	0	308	31
