= Sergei Bozhin =

Russian footballer (born 1994)

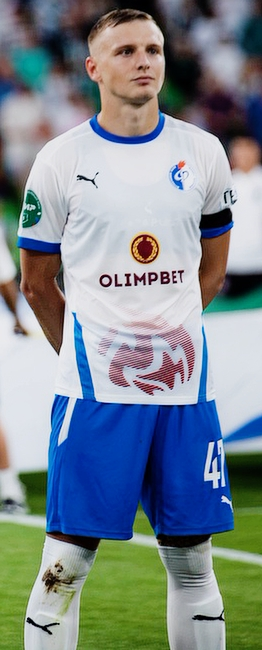
- Bozhin with Fakel Voronezh in 2022

Personal information
- Full name: Sergei Vitalyevich Bozhin
- Date of birth: 12 September 1994 (age 32)
- Place of birth: Samara, Russia
- Height: 1.87 m (6 ft 2 in)
- Position: Centre back

Team information
- Current team: Krylia Sovetov Samara
- Number: 47

Youth career
- 2002–2008: Lokomotiv Samara
- 2008–2010: Konoplyov football academy
- 2011: Yunit Samara
- 2011–2012: Krylia Sovetov Samara

Senior career*
Years	Team	Apps	(Gls)
2013–2017	Krylia Sovetov Samara	31	(1)
2017	Lada-Togliatti	11	(0)
2018	Syzran-2003	8	(2)
2018–2019	Fakel Voronezh	37	(2)
2019–2020	Torpedo Moscow	25	(4)
2020–2022	Krylia Sovetov Samara	35	(1)
2022–2025	Fakel Voronezh	70	(4)
2025–	Krylia Sovetov Samara	39	(1)
- * Club domestic league appearances and goals as of 20 November 2026

Sergei Vitalyevich Bozhin (Russian: Серге́й Витальевич Божин; born 12 September 1994) is a Russian professional footballer who plays as a centre-back for Krylia Sovetov Samara.

== Club career ==
Bozhin made his professional debut for Krylia Sovetov Samara on 3 June 2013 in the Premier League relegation play-off second leg against Spartak Nalchik, coming as a substitute on the 81st minute. However, he did not make a single appearance for the club in the following 2013–14 season. Krylia Sovetov, eventually, were relegated at the end of that season.

During the 2014–15 Russian Football National League season, Bozhin made 17 appearances and scored his first goal for Krylia Sovetov. The following 2015–16 Krylia Sovetov season was the club's first season return in the top division, but, again, Bozhin did not make a single appearance for the club.

Bozhin, eventually, made his debut in the Russian Premier League on 8 August 2016 in a 0–1 away loss against FC Spartak Moscow, coming on as a substitute on the 81st minute.

On 29 August 2017, Bozhin dropped the leagues by signing at first for Lada-Tolyatti, and later for Syzran-2003 in the Russian Professional Football League.

In summer 2018, Bozhin signed for Fakel Voronezh, making 37 appearances and scoring 2 goals in the 2018–19 Russian Football National League. He later moved to Torpedo Moscow the next summer as a free agent, making 25 appearances and scoring 4 goals in the following 2019–20 Russian Football National League season.

Due to the end of the contract with Torpedo, Bozhin returned to Krylia Sovetov Samara, which just had relegated from the top division, signing a two-year contract. During his second spell at the club, he played a total of 41 games, scoring 2 goals.

On 27 June 2022, Bozhin returned to Fakel Voronezh. He made 21 appearances for the club during the 2022–23 Russian Premier League season, scoring 2 goals (both headers, against his former club Torpedo Moscow and Akhmat Grozny on 2 October 2022 and 16 April 2023 respectively).

On 19 June 2023, Bozhin extended his contract with Fakel, keeping him at the club until 30 June 2024. On 7 June 2024, Bozhin extended his contract with Fakel once more.

On 23 June 2025, Bozhin returned to Krylia Sovetov Samara on a two-season deal.

== Career statistics ==
As of match played 20 November 2026

Appearances and goals by club, season and competition
Club	Season	League			Cup		Other		Total	
Club	Season	Division	Apps	Goals	Apps	Goals	Apps	Goals	Apps	Goals
Krylia Sovetov Samara	2012–13	Russian Premier League	0	0	0	0	1 (Note: Appearances in the relegation play-offs)	0	1	0
Krylia Sovetov Samara	2013–14	Russian Premier League	0	0	0	0	—		0	0
Krylia Sovetov Samara	2014–15	Russian First League	17	1	2	0	2 (Note: Appearances in the FNL Cup)	0	21	1
Krylia Sovetov Samara	2015–16	Russian Premier League	0	0	0	0	—		0	0
Krylia Sovetov Samara	2016–17	Russian Premier League	14	0	1	0	—		15	0
Lada-Tolyatti	2017–18	Russian Second League	11	0	—		—		11	0
Syzran-2003	2017–18	Russian Second League	8	2	—		—		8	2
Fakel Voronezh	2018–19	Russian First League	37	2	0	0	5	0	42	2
Torpedo Moscow	2019–20	Russian First League	25	4	4	1	—		29	5
Krylia Sovetov Samara	2020–21	Russian First League	30	1	5	1	—		35	2
Krylia Sovetov Samara	2021–22	Russian Premier League	5	0	1	0	—		6	0
Krylia Sovetov Samara	Total		35	1	6	1	—		41	2
Fakel Voronezh	2022–23	Russian Premier League	21	2	4	0	2	0	27	2
Fakel Voronezh	2023–24	Russian Premier League	26	2	1	0	—		27	2
Fakel Voronezh	2024–25	Russian Premier League	23	0	2	0	—		25	0
Fakel Voronezh	Total		70	4	7	0	2	0	79	4
Fakel Voronezh	Club total		107	6	7	0	7	0	121	6
Krylia Sovetov Samara	2025–26	Russian Premier League	24	1	9	1	—		33	2
Krylia Sovetov Samara	2026–27	Russian Premier League	15	0	0	0	—		15	0
Krylia Sovetov Samara	Total		39	1	9	1	0	0	48	2
Krylia Sovetov Samara	Club total		105	3	18	2	3	0	126	5
Career total			256	15	29	3	10	0	295	18
