= Dmitri Yatchenko =

Russian footballer (born 1986)

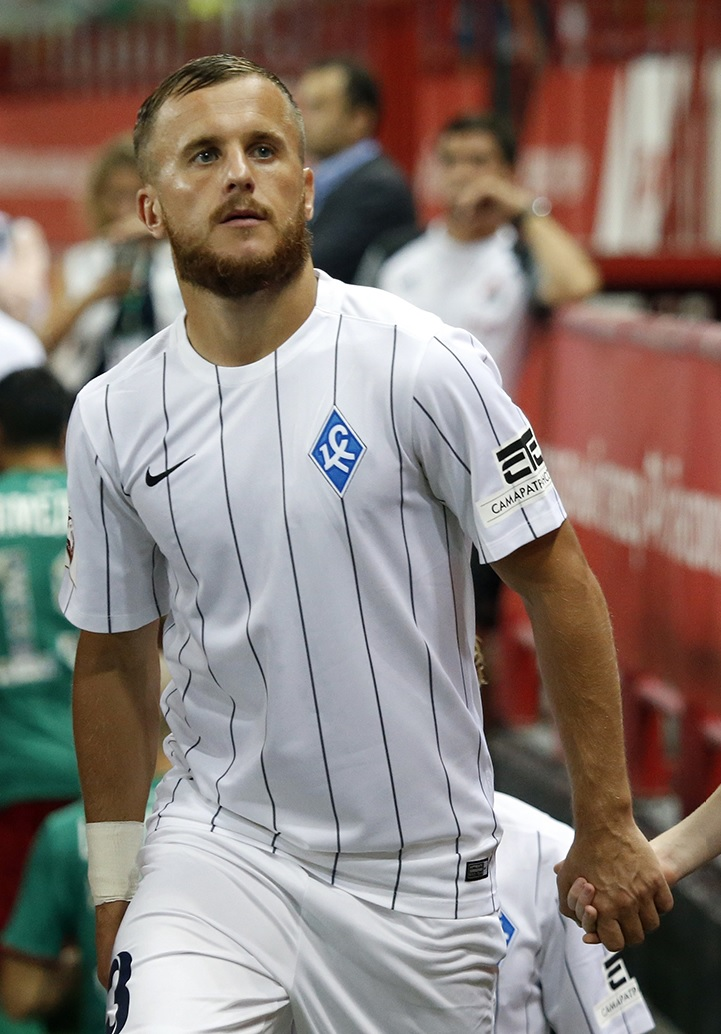
- Yatchenko with Krylia Sovetov in 2016

Personal information
- Full name: Dmitri Ivanovich Yatchenko
- Date of birth: 25 August 1986 (age 40)
- Place of birth: Moscow, Soviet Union
- Height: 1.72 m (5 ft 8 in)
- Position: Full-back

Youth career
- 2004–2005: Dynamo Moscow
- 2006: Spartak Nalchik

Senior career*
Years	Team	Apps	(Gls)
2007–2009	Spartak Nalchik	71	(0)
2010–2013	Terek Grozny	101	(0)
2014–2018	Krylia Sovetov Samara	116	(9)
2018–2019	Yenisey Krasnoyarsk	22	(2)
2019	Dinamo Minsk	13	(2)
2020	Shakhter Karagandy	16	(0)
2021	Akron Tolyatti	5	(0)

International career
2007–2008	Russia U21	9	(0)
2011	Russia-2	1	(0)
- * Club domestic league appearances and goals

Dmitri Ivanovich Yatchenko (Russian: Дмитрий Иванович Ятченко; born 25 August 1986) is a Russian former footballer who played as a right-back.

== Career ==
Yatchenko began his career with FC Dynamo Moscow. In January 2006, he signed with FC Spartak Nalchik. On 28 December 2009, FC Terek Grozny signed the wingback from Spartak Nalchik on a two-year deal. On 29 December 2013, Yatchenko signed a two-and-a-half-year deal with Krylia Sovetov. On 26 February 2020, Yatchenko signed for Shakhter Karagandy.

== Career statistics ==
=== Club ===
As of match played 30 November 2020

Appearances and goals by club, season and competition
Club	Season	League			National Cup		Continental		Other		Total	
Club	Season	Division	Apps	Goals	Apps	Goals	Apps	Goals	Apps	Goals	Apps	Goals
Spartak Nalchik	2007	Russian Premier League	18	0	2	0	-				20	0
Spartak Nalchik	2008	Russian Premier League	29	0	1	0	-				30	0
Spartak Nalchik	2009	Russian Premier League	24	0	1	0	-				25	0
Spartak Nalchik	Total		71	0	4	0	-	-	-	-	75	0
Terek Grozny	2010	Russian Premier League	30	0	0	0	-				30	0
Terek Grozny	2011–12	Russian Premier League	39	1	2	0	-				41	1
Terek Grozny	2012–13	Russian Premier League	25	0	2	0	-				27	0
Terek Grozny	2013–14	Russian Premier League	7	0	1	0	-				8	0
Terek Grozny	Total		101	1	5	0	-	-	-	-	106	1
Krylia Sovetov	2013–14	Russian Premier League	9	0	0	0	-		2	0	11	0
Krylia Sovetov	2014–15	Football National League	29	1	3	1	-				32	2
Krylia Sovetov	2015–16	Russian Premier League	18	0	1	0	-				19	0
Krylia Sovetov	2016–17	Russian Premier League	28	2	1	0	-				29	2
Krylia Sovetov	2017–18	Football National League	32	6	2	0	-				34	6
Krylia Sovetov	Total		116	9	7	1	-	-	2	0	125	10
Yenisey Krasnoyarsk	2018–19	Russian Premier League	22	2	2	0	–				24	2
Dinamo Minsk	2019	Belarusian Premier League	13	2	1	0	–				14	2
Shakhter Karagandy	2020	Kazakhstan Premier League	16	0	0	0	–				16	0
Career total			339	14	19	1	-	-	2	0	360	15

== Personal life ==
He is an identical twin brother of Yevgeni Yatchenko.
