= Taras Burlak =

Russian footballer

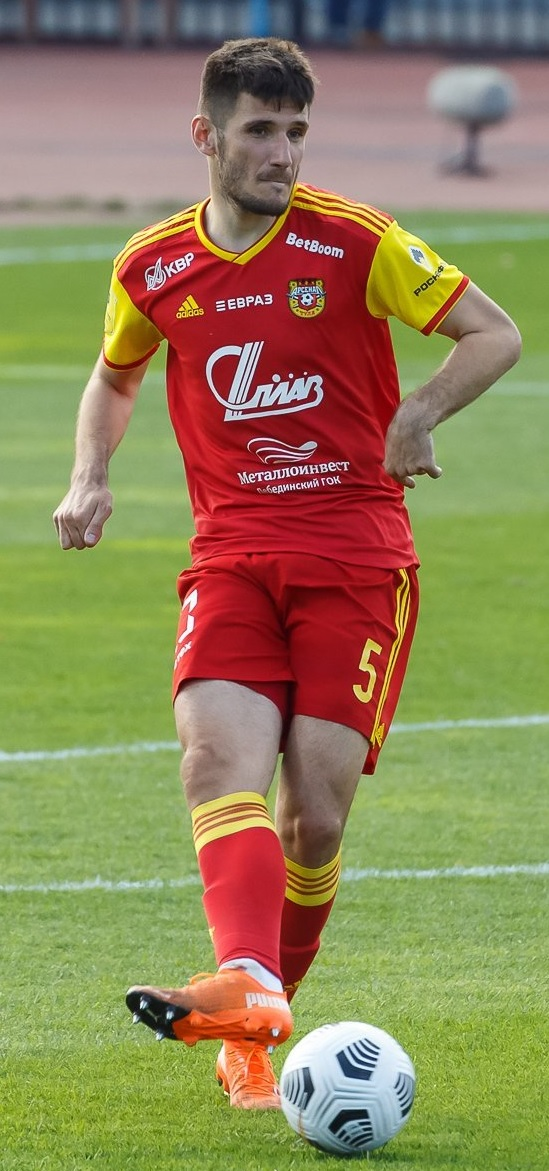
- Burlak with Arsenal Tula in 2020

Personal information
- Full name: Taras Aleksandrovich Burlak
- Date of birth: 22 February 1990 (age 36)
- Place of birth: Vladivostok, USSR
- Height: 1.87 m (6 ft 2 in)
- Position: Centre back

Youth career
- –2003: Luch Vladivostok
- 2003–2007: Lokomotiv Moscow

Senior career*
Years	Team	Apps	(Gls)
2008–2013	Lokomotiv Moscow	56	(1)
2009	→ Volga Nizhny Novgorod (loan)	1	(0)
2014–2017	Rubin Kazan	27	(0)
2014–2015	→ Rubin-2 Kazan	3	(0)
2015–2016	→ Krylia Sovetov Samara (loan)	41	(1)
2018–2020	Krylia Sovetov Samara	45	(5)
2020–2022	Arsenal Tula	17	(0)
2022–2023	Znamya Noginsk	6	(0)

International career
2009	Russia U-19	8	(2)
2010–2013	Russia U-21	20	(2)
2011	Russia	1	(0)
- * Club domestic league appearances and goals

Taras Aleksandrovich Burlak (Russian: Тарас Александрович Бурлак; born 22 February 1990) is a Russian former professional association footballer who played as centre-back.

== Club career ==
=== Lokomotiv ===
Burlak was scouted by Lokomotiv Moscow academy in 2003. In 2007, he joined club youth system, playing for Lokomotiv U21. On 24 September 2008 he made his debut appearance for the main Lokomotiv squad, playing all 90 minutes in Russian Cup home match vs Vityaz Podolsk. The first half of 2009 season he spent on loan at Volga Nizhny Novgorod, gaining first-team experience. In 2010, he made his league debut for Lokomotiv Moscow, coming as a substitute in home match vs Alania Vladikavkaz. In 2011–2012 season Burlak featured regularly for the first team, gaining himself debut call-up for Russia national team. 2012–2013 season saw Burlak continuing his run in Lokomotiv main squad. But after making only one league plus one cup appearance in the first half of 2013–2014 season, Burlak decided to continue his career elsewhere.

=== Rubin ===
On 30 January 2014, Lokomotiv Moscow made a transfer agreement with Rubin Kazan and Burlak signed a four-and-a-half-year deal with the Kazan club.

=== Krylia Sovetov ===
On 16 January 2018, he signed a long-term deal with Krylia Sovetov Samara.

=== Arsenal Tula ===
On 15 August 2020, he moved to FC Arsenal Tula.

=== FC Krasnoye Znamya Noginsk ===
In 2022, he transferred to FC Krasnoye Znamya Noginsk, played 6 matches, and then retired from professional football.

== International career ==
Burlak made his debut for the Russia national football team on 7 June 2011 in a friendly against Cameroon.

== Career statistics ==
As of 21 May 2022

Club	Season	League			Cup		Continental		Other		Total	
Club	Season	Division	Apps	Goals	Apps	Goals	Apps	Goals	Apps	Goals	Apps	Goals
Lokomotiv Moscow	2008	RPL	0	0	1	0	–		–		1	0
Lokomotiv Moscow	2010	RPL	3	0	1	0	1 (Note: Appearances in the UEFA Europa League)	0	–		5	0
Lokomotiv Moscow	2011–12	RPL	35	1	3	0	6	0	–		44	1
Lokomotiv Moscow	2012–13	RPL	17	0	1	0	–		–		18	0
Lokomotiv Moscow	2013–14	RPL	1	0	1	0	–		–		2	0
Lokomotiv Moscow	Total		56	1	7	0	7	0	0	0	70	1
Volga Nizhny Novgorod (loan)	2009	FNL	1	0	–		–		–		1	0
Rubin Kazan	2013–14	RPL	2	0	–		2	0	–		4	0
Rubin Kazan	2014–15	RPL	2	0	0	0	–		–		2	0
Rubin Kazan	2016–17	RPL	22	0	4	0	–		–		26	0
Rubin Kazan	2017–18	RPL	1	0	1	0	–		–		2	0
Rubin Kazan	Total		27	0	5	0	2	0	0	0	34	0
Rubin-2 Kazan	2014–15	PFL	3	0	–		–		–		3	0
Krylia Sovetov Samara (loan)	2014–15	FNL	13	1	0	0	–		2 (Note: Appearances in the FNL Cup)	0	15	1
Krylia Sovetov Samara (loan)	2015–16	RPL	28	0	2	0	–		–		30	0
Krylia Sovetov Samara	2017–18	FNL	13	1	1	0	–		5	2	19	3
Krylia Sovetov Samara	2018–19	RPL	23	2	0	0	–		0	0	23	2
Krylia Sovetov Samara	2019–20	RPL	8	2	1	0	–		–		9	2
Krylia Sovetov Samara	2020–21	FNL	1	0	–		–		–		1	0
Krylia Sovetov Samara	Total (2 spells)		86	6	4	0	0	0	7	2	97	8
Arsenal Tula	2020–21	RPL	15	0	3	0	–		–		18	0
Arsenal Tula	2021–22	RPL	2	0	0	0	–		–		2	0
Arsenal Tula	Total		17	0	3	0	0	0	0	0	20	0
Career total			190	7	19	0	9	0	7	2	225	9
