= Nadson (footballer, born 1984) =

Brazilian footballer

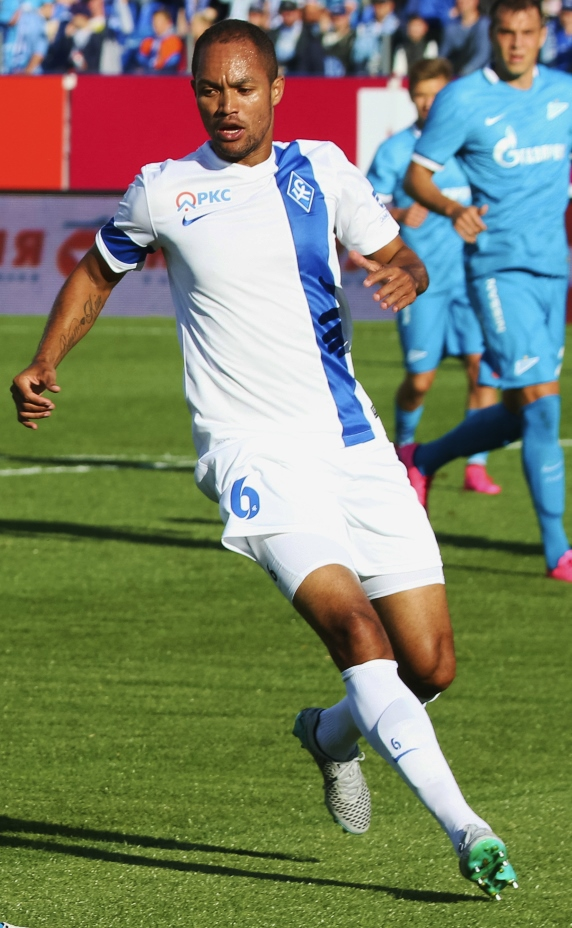
- Nadson with Krylia Sovetov in 2015

Personal information
- Full name: José Nadson Ferreira
- Date of birth: 18 October 1984 (age 42)
- Place of birth: Ubaitaba, Brazil
- Height: 1.90 m (6 ft 3 in)
- Position: Centre back

Youth career
- Roma Apucarana
- 2004–2005: Santos

Senior career*
| Years | Team | Apps | (Gls) |
| 2004 | Roma Apucarana | | |
| 2004–2005 | Santos | 1 | (0) |
| 2005 | → Londrina (loan) | | |
| 2006 | Bragantino | | |
| 2007–2011 | Sheriff Tiraspol | 144 | (14) |
| 2011 | → Genk (loan) | 13 | (0) |
| 2011–2013 | Genk | 51 | (1) |
| 2013–2018 | Krylia Sovetov | 115 | (0) |
| 2019–2020 | SJK | 18 | (1) |
- * Club domestic league appearances and goals

José Nadson Ferreira (born 18 October 1984), commonly known as Nadson, is a Brazilian former footballer who played as a centre-back.

== Career ==
=== Club ===
On 14 December 2012, Genk announced the extension of Nadson's contract until June 2015.

On 31 August 2013, Nadson joined PFC Krylia Sovetov Samara. He left Krylia Sovetov in January 2019.

On 3 March 2019, he signed with Finnish club SJK. On 20 July 2020, he terminated his contract and left the club.

== Career statistics ==
=== Club ===
As of match played 13 September 2019

Appearances and goals by club, season and competition
| Club | Season | League | | | National Cup | | Continental | | Other | | Total | |
| Club | Season | Division | Apps | Goals | Apps | Goals | Apps | Goals | Apps | Goals | Apps | Goals |
|---|---|---|---|---|---|---|---|---|---|---|---|---|
| Genk (loan) | 2010–11 | Belgian Pro League | 13 | 0 | 0 | 0 | 0 | 0 | – | | 13 | 0 |
| Genk | 2011–12 | Belgian Pro League | 33 | 1 | 2 | 0 | 9 | 0 | 1 | 0 | 45 | 1 |
| Genk | 2011–12 | Belgian Pro League | 18 | 0 | 3 | 0 | 9 | 0 | – | | 30 | 0 |
| Genk | Total | | 51 | 1 | 5 | 0 | 18 | 0 | 1 | 0 | 75 | 1 |
| Krylia Sovetov | 2013–14 | Russian Premier League | 12 | 0 | 1 | 0 | - | | 0 | 0 | 13 | 0 |
| Krylia Sovetov | 2014–15 | Russian National League | 17 | 0 | 3 | 0 | - | | - | | 20 | 0 |
| Krylia Sovetov | 2015–16 | Russian Premier League | 25 | 0 | 2 | 0 | - | | - | | 27 | 0 |
| Krylia Sovetov | 2016–17 | Russian Premier League | 28 | 0 | 2 | 0 | - | | - | | 30 | 0 |
| Krylia Sovetov | 2017–18 | Russian National League | 26 | 0 | 3 | 0 | - | | - | | 29 | 0 |
| Krylia Sovetov | 2018–19 | Russian Premier League | 7 | 0 | 1 | 0 | - | | - | | 8 | 0 |
| Krylia Sovetov | Total | | 115 | 0 | 12 | 0 | - | - | - | - | 127 | 0 |
| SJK | 2019 | Veikkausliiga | 18 | 1 | 0 | 0 | – | | – | | 18 | 1 |
| Career total | | | 197 | 2 | 17 | 0 | 18 | 0 | 1 | 0 | 233 | 2 |

== Honours ==
Sheriff Tiraspol

- Moldovan National Division: 2006–07, 2007–08
- Moldovan Cup: 2007–08
- Moldovan Super Cup: 2007
- Commonwealth of Independent States Cup: 2009

Genk

- Belgian Pro League: 2010–11
- Belgian Super Cup: 2011
- Belgian Cup: 2012–13
