= Aleksei Pomerko =

Russian footballer

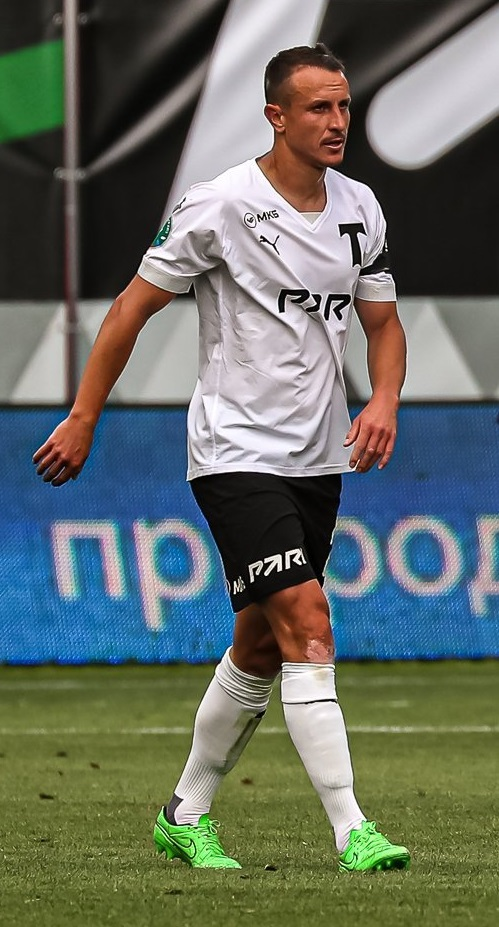
- Pomerko with Torpedo Moscow in 2022

Personal information
- Full name: Aleksei Sergeyevich Pomerko
- Date of birth: 3 May 1990 (age 36)
- Place of birth: Gorodovikovsk, Russian SFSR
- Height: 1.82 m (6 ft 0 in)
- Position: Midfielder

Youth career
- FC Torpedo Moscow

Senior career*
Years	Team	Apps	(Gls)
2008	FC Torpedo Moscow	8	(0)
2009–2011	FC Amkar Perm	16	(0)
2011	→ FC Lokomotiv-2 Moscow (loan)	14	(0)
2012–2013	FC Volga Nizhny Novgorod	2	(0)
2012–2013	→ FC Khimki (loan)	28	(1)
2013	FC Shinnik Yaroslavl	22	(1)
2014–2015	FC Krasnodar	6	(0)
2014–2015	→ FC Krylia Sovetov Samara (loan)	21	(1)
2015–2016	FC Krylia Sovetov Samara	27	(0)
2016–2017	FC Orenburg	19	(0)
2017–2018	FC Tom Tomsk	28	(3)
2018–2021	PFC Sochi	43	(3)
2021–2022	FC Torpedo Moscow	41	(7)
2022–2024	FC Arsenal Tula	27	(1)
2024–2025	FC Chelyabinsk	52	(6)

International career^{‡}
2008–2009	Russia U-19	7	(0)
2010–2012	Russia U-21	9	(0)
- * Club domestic league appearances and goals as of 1 July 2025 ‡ National team caps and goals as of 29 February 2012

Aleksei Sergeyevich Pomerko (Russian: Алексей Серге́евич Померко; born 3 May 1990) is a Russian former professional footballer.

== Club career ==
He made his professional debut in the Russian First Division in 2008 for FC Torpedo Moscow.

As a member of PFC Sochi, he became a silver medalist of the Russian Football National League.

== Honours ==
Torpedo Moscow

- Russian Football National League: 2021–22

== Career statistics ==
As of 27 November 2022

Club	Season	League			Cup		Continental		Other		Total	
Club	Season	Division	Apps	Goals	Apps	Goals	Apps	Goals	Apps	Goals	Apps	Goals
Torpedo Moscow	2008	First League	8	0	0	0	–		–		8	0
Amkar Perm	2009	Premier League	10	0	2	0	0	0	–		12	0
Amkar Perm	2010	Premier League	6	0	1	0	–		–		7	0
Amkar Perm	Total		16	0	3	0	0	0	0	0	19	0
Lokomotiv-2 Moscow	2011–12	Second League	14	0	2	0	–		–		16	0
Volga Nizhny Novgorod	2011–12	Premier League	2	0	0	0	–		–		2	0
Khimki	2012–13	First League	28	1	3	0	–		–		31	1
Shinnik Yaroslavl	2013–14	First League	22	1	2	0	–		–		24	1
Krasnodar	2013–14	Premier League	5	0	0	0	–		–		5	0
Krasnodar	2014–15	Premier League	1	0	–		4 (Note: Appearances in the UEFA Europa League)	0	–		5	0
Krasnodar	Total		6	0	0	0	4	0	0	0	10	0
Krylia Sovetov Samara	2014–15	First League	21	1	2	0	–		1 (Note: Appearance in the FNL Cup)	0	24	1
Krylia Sovetov Samara	2015–16	Premier League	27	0	2	0	–		–		29	0
Krylia Sovetov Samara	Total		48	1	4	0	0	0	1	0	53	1
Orenburg	2016–17	Premier League	13	0	1	0	–		–		14	0
Orenburg	2017–18	First League	6	0	0	0	–		–		6	0
Orenburg	Total		19	0	1	0	0	0	0	0	20	0
Tom Tomsk	2017–18	First League	28	3	2	0	–		–		30	3
Sochi	2018–19	First League	33	3	0	0	–		–		33	3
Sochi	2019–20	Premier League	10	0	1	0	–		–		11	0
Sochi	2020–21	Premier League	0	0	0	0	–		–		0	0
Sochi	Total		43	3	1	0	0	0	0	0	44	3
Torpedo Moscow	2021–22	First League	33	6	1	0	–		–		34	6
Torpedo Moscow	2022–23	Premier League	8	1	0	0	–		–		8	1
Torpedo Moscow	Total (2 spells)		49	7	1	0	0	0	0	0	50	7
Arsenal Tula	2022–23	First League	8	1	1	0	–		–		9	1
Career total			283	17	20	0	4	0	1	0	308	17
