= Vladimir Ponomaryov (footballer, born 1987) =

Russian footballer

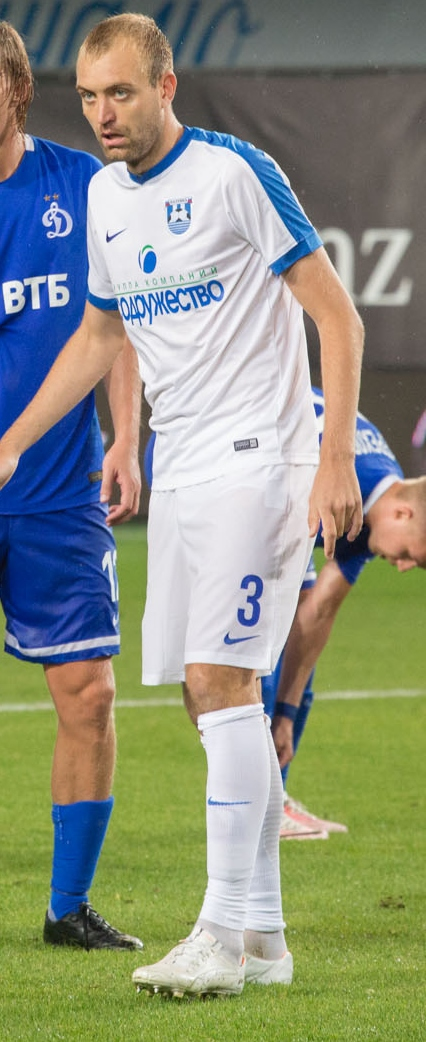
- Ponomaryov with Baltika in 2016

Personal information
- Full name: Vladimir Sergeyevich Ponomaryov
- Date of birth: 22 April 1987 (age 39)
- Place of birth: Omsk, Soviet Union
- Height: 1.92 m (6 ft 4 in)
- Position: Centre back

Senior career*
Years	Team	Apps	(Gls)
2004	FC Rotor Volgograd	0	(0)
2005	FC Dynamo Moscow	0	(0)
2006	FC Rostov	0	(0)
2007	FC Sodovik Sterlitamak	27	(0)
2008	FC Krasnodar	31	(1)
2009	FC Dynamo Bryansk	27	(1)
2010–2011	FC Volgar-Gazprom Astrakhan	55	(2)
2012–2013	FC Mordovia Saransk	29	(0)
2012–2013	→ FC Torpedo Moscow (loan)	9	(1)
2014	FC Luch-Energiya Vladivostok	10	(0)
2014–2015	FC Tosno	17	(0)
2015	FC Tyumen	26	(1)
2016	FC Solyaris Moscow	6	(0)
2016	FC Baltika Kaliningrad	15	(1)
2017	FC Olimpiyets Nizhny Novgorod	6	(0)
2017	FC Dynamo Bryansk	14	(0)
2018	FC Kolkheti-1913 Poti	15	(0)
2018–2019	FC Irtysh Omsk	15	(2)
- * Club domestic league appearances and goals

Vladimir Sergeyevich Ponomaryov (Russian: Владимир Серге́евич Пономарёв; born 22 April 1987) is a Russian former professional football player.

== Club career ==
He played for the main squad of FC Rostov in the Russian Cup.

On 29 January 2015, Ponomaryov moved to FC Tyumen.
