= Aleksei Gladyshev =

Russian footballer

Personal information
- Full name: Aleksei Yevgenyevich Gladyshev
- Date of birth: 8 December 1992 (age 33)
- Place of birth: Novosibirsk, Russia
- Height: 1.80 m (5 ft 11 in)
- Positions: Midfielder; defender

Senior career*
Years	Team	Apps	(Gls)
2009	Sibir-LFK Novosibirsk		
2010	Sibir Novosibirsk	0	(0)
2011	Sibir-2 Novosibirsk	26	(0)
2012–2019	Sibir Novosibirsk	184	(3)
2019	Fakel Voronezh	19	(1)
2020–2024	Novosibirsk	54	(1)
- * Club domestic league appearances and goals as of 8 June 2024

Aleksei Yevgenyevich Gladyshev (Russian: Алексей Евгеньевич Гладышев; born 8 December 1992) is a Russian football player.

== Club career ==
Gladyshev made his debut in the Russian Second Division for Sibir-2 Novosibirsk on 23 April 2011 in a game against KUZBASS Kemerovo.

He made his Russian Football National League debut for Sibir Novosibirsk on 13 August 2012 in a game against Baltika Kaliningrad.
