= Sergei Kornilenko =

Belarusian footballer

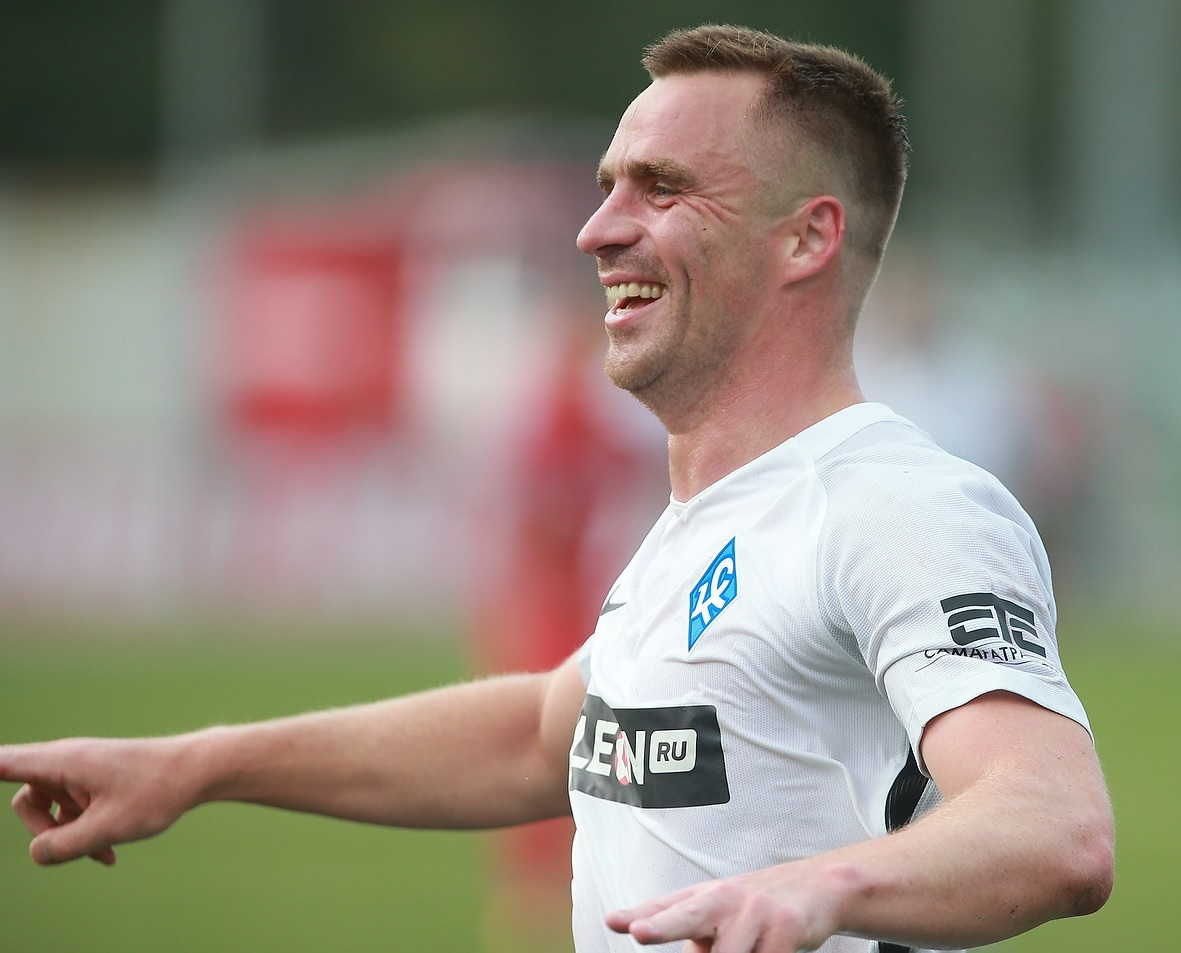
- Kornilenko playing for Krylia Sovetov in 2017

Personal information
- Full name: Sergei Aleksandrovich Kornilenko
- Date of birth: 14 June 1983 (age 43)
- Place of birth: Vitebsk, Belarusian SSR, Soviet Union
- Height: 1.86 m (6 ft 1 in)
- Position: Striker

Team information
- Current team: Sochi (assistant coach)

Youth career
- DYuSSh Vitebsk

Senior career*
Years	Team	Apps	(Gls)
2000	Lokomotiv-96 Vitebsk	4	(0)
2000	→ Lokomotiv Vitebsk	6	(3)
2000–2001	Dinamo-Juni Minsk	22	(4)
2001–2003	Dinamo Minsk	46	(23)
2004	Dynamo Kyiv	12	(2)
2004	→ Dynamo-3 Kyiv	1	(0)
2005–2008	Dnipro Dnipropetrovsk	88	(25)
2008–2009	Tom Tomsk	13	(6)
2009–2011	Zenit Saint Petersburg	11	(1)
2010	→ Tom Tomsk (loan)	15	(11)
2010	→ Rubin Kazan (loan)	8	(3)
2011	→ Blackpool (loan)	6	(0)
2011–2019	Krylia Sovetov Samara	190	(54)
2021	Krylia Sovetov Samara	1	(1)
Total		422	(132)

International career
2000	Belarus U-17	4	(1)
2002	Belarus U-19	1	(0)
2003–2005	Belarus U-21	17	(6)
2012	Belarus Olympic	4	(0)
2004–2016	Belarus	78	(17)

Managerial career
- 2019–2020: Krylia Sovetov Samara (assistant)
- 2020–2024: Krylia Sovetov Samara (sporting director)
- 2025–: Sochi (assistant)
- * Club domestic league appearances and goals

Sergei Aleksandrovich Kornilenko (Belarusian: Сяргей Аляксандравіч Карніленка; Russian: Сергей Александрович Корниленко; born 14 June 1983) is a Belarusian professional football coach and a former player who played as a striker. He is an assistant coach with Russian club Sochi. In Belarus, both Belarusian and Russian languages are official. Thus his name, usually transliterated as Sergei Kornilenko (Russian: Серге́й Корниленко), can be alternatively spelled as Syarhey Karnilenka (Belarusian: Сяргей Карніленка).

== Career ==
Vitebsk-born Kornilenko began his career in his native Belarus as a trainee with FC Dinamo Minsk before joining his hometown club. After an unsuccessful half a season with Vitebsk he returned to Minsk, where he spent three seasons before moving to Ukraine with Dynamo Kyiv and Dnipro Dnipropetrovsk.

In 2008, he moved to the Russian Premier League with FC Tom Tomsk, with whom he enjoyed a successful first season. On 19 July 2009 FC Zenit signed the striker until December 2013. The Russian club had needed a new striker after a serious injury to Danny and after transfer listing Fatih Tekke. On 9 March 2010 Kornilenko was loaned back to Tom Tomsk for the remainder of the 2009–10 season. He returned to Zenit in the summer of 2010 but was loaned out again, this time to Rubin Kazan, until January 2011. On 31 January 2011, Kornilenko signed on loan for English Premier League club Blackpool, turning down a move to Standard Liège in the process. In June 2011, he signed a contract with Russian Premier League club Krylia Sovetov Samara.

He announced his retirement on 10 July 2019. On 17 February 2021, Krylia Sovetov announced that he will be registered as a club player again to play a farewell game at the home field. He scored the last goal of a 6–0 victory over FC Krasnodar-2 on 8 May 2021, one minute after appearing as a substitute in the 83rd minute. Krylia Sovetov had secured their return to the Russian Premier League two games prior to that one.

== International career ==
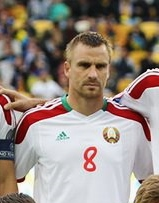
Kornilenko lining up for Belarus

Kornilenko has been a regular member of the Belarus national football team, earning his first cap in 2004. On 8 September 2015, Kornilenko captained his side in the absence of suspended Alyaksandr Martynovich in the 2:0 win over Luxembourg in a Euro 2016 qualifier.

In the summer of 2012 he was selected as one of the over aged players to represent Belarus at the 2012 Summer Olympics in London to participate in the Men's football tournament.

=== International goals ===
#	Date	Venue	Opponent	Score	Result	Competition
1	12 November 2005	Vitebsky CSK, Vitebsk, Belarus	Latvia	2-1	3–1	Friendly
2	12 November 2005	Vitebsky CSK, Vitebsk, Belarus	Latvia	3-1	3–1	Friendly
3	1 March 2006	Pafiako Stadium, Paphos, Cyprus	Finland	1 – 0	2–2	Cyprus International Football Tournament
4	16 August 2006	Dinamo Stadium, Minsk, Belarus	Andorra	3 – 0	3–0	Friendly
5	7 October 2006	Steaua Stadium, Bucharest, Romania	Romania	1 – 2	1–3	Euro 2008 qualifier
6	11 November 2006	Dinamo Stadium, Minsk, Belarus	Slovenia	2-2	4–2	Euro 2008 qualifier
7	11 November 2006	Dinamo Stadium, Minsk, Belarus	Slovenia	3-2	4–2	Euro 2008 qualifier
8	6 June 2009	Neman Stadium, Grodno, Belarus	Andorra	3-0	5–1	World Cup 2010 qualifier
9	6 June 2009	Neman Stadium, Grodno, Belarus	Andorra	4-0	5–1	World Cup 2010 qualifier
10	7 June 2011	Dinamo Stadium, Minsk, Belarus	Luxembourg	1 – 0	2–0	Euro 2012 qualifier
11	7 October 2011	Stadionul Național, Bucharest, Romania	Romania	1 – 1	2–2	Euro 2012 qualifier
12	15 November 2011	Police Officers Club Stadium, Dubai, United Arab Emirates	Libya	1 – 1	1–1	Friendly
13	14 August 2013	Torpedo Stadium, Zhodino, Belarus	Montenegro	1 – 0	1–1	Friendly
14	11 October 2013	Iberostar Stadium, Palma, Spain	Spain	1 – 2	1–2	2014 World Cup qualifier
15	4 September 2014	Borisov Arena, Borisov, Belarus	Tajikistan	2 – 1	6–1	Friendly
16	27 March 2015	Philip II Arena, Skopje, Macedonia	North Macedonia	2 - 1	2–1	Euro 2016 qualifier
17	5 September 2015	Arena Lviv, Lviv, Ukraine	Ukraine	3 - 1	3–1	Euro 2016 qualifier

== Personal life ==
Kornilenko is married and has a daughter.

== Honours ==
Dinamo Minsk

- Belarusian Cup winner: 2002–03
- Belarusian Premier League top scorer: 2003

Dynamo Kyiv

- Ukrainian Premier League champion: 2003–04
- Ukrainian Super Cup winner: 2004

Zenit St. Petersburg

- Russian Cup: 2009–10

Krylia Sovetov

- Russian Football National League winner: 2014–15, 2020-21
