= Metallurg Stadium =

Football stadium in Samara, Russia

Metallurg
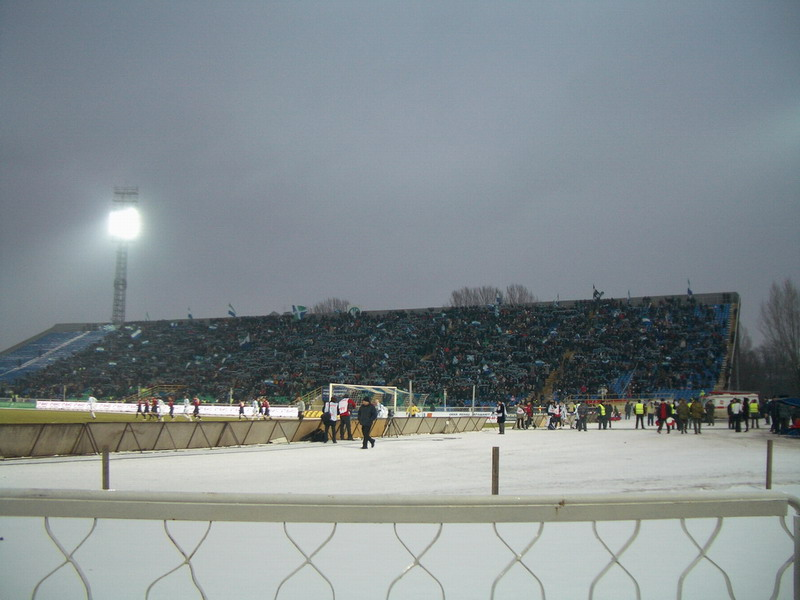
- Interactive map of Metallurg
- Location: Ulitsa Stroiteley, Samara, Russia
- Coordinates: 53°14′18″N 50°16′18″E
- Capacity: 33,001
- Field size: 101.78 m х 68.04 m

Construction
- Built: 1957
- Opened: August 10, 1957

Tenants
- FC Krylia Sovetov Samara; FC Akron Tolyatti (2020–)

The Metallurg Stadium (Russian: «Металлург») is a football stadium in Samara, Russia, and is home to Russian Premier League club FC Krylia Sovetov. Opened in 1957 and rebuilt in the 1970s, Metallurg Stadium became an urban attractor embodying Soviet modernism and "Cosmic Kuibyshev". It has also been repeatedly awarded the VCSPS Diploma, which rates the quality of all sport complexes in Russia.

== History ==
Metallurg Stadium (Samara Oblast)

=== Construction ===
On 7 November 1956, a construction company, 'Metallurgist', performing a construction of a factory at the time, announced that a new stadium was to be built. The stadium was then partially completed in 1957. The rapid completion of the stadium was due to the compatibility of two projects being completed at the same time: raw materials were being manufactured in the Lenin Kuibyshev Metallurg Factory and were delivered to the stadium directly.

Metallurg's official opening took place on 10 August 1957 with the uncompleted tribune being replaced by wooden benches, the capacity of which was around 8,000. The benches were not removed from the stadium until 1976.

=== First matches and tenants ===
When Metallurg was first completed, it was the home stadium of FC Metallurg Kuibyshev and one of the home stadiums of Krylya Sovetov Samara reserve squad. On 6 July 1965, Metallurg became the official home stadium of Krylya Sovetov Samara, when 'Krylya' played their first official game on the stadium. The match took place in the Quarterfinals of the 1965 USSR Football Cup, where Krylya defeated Dinamo Saint Petersburg by three goals to one.

Metallurg became Krylya's domestic league home stadium on 2 May 1970.

=== Renovations and upgrades ===
On 1976, the wooden benches were replaced by reinforced concrete seats on the stadium's tribune.

During the following two off-seasons, the Western and the Northern sectors were constructed. The capacity of the stadium reached 38,000 seats. The first match with a heated pitch was played on 1 November 1997.

=== Awards ===
Metallurg Stadium was repeatedly awarded the VCSPS Diploma in the period from 1970 to 1990. It was also assigned a 'category B' class by the Russian Football Union, which allowed the Metallurg Stadium to host any competitions, held by the aegis of the Russian Football Union.

The certificate expired on 1 June 2012.

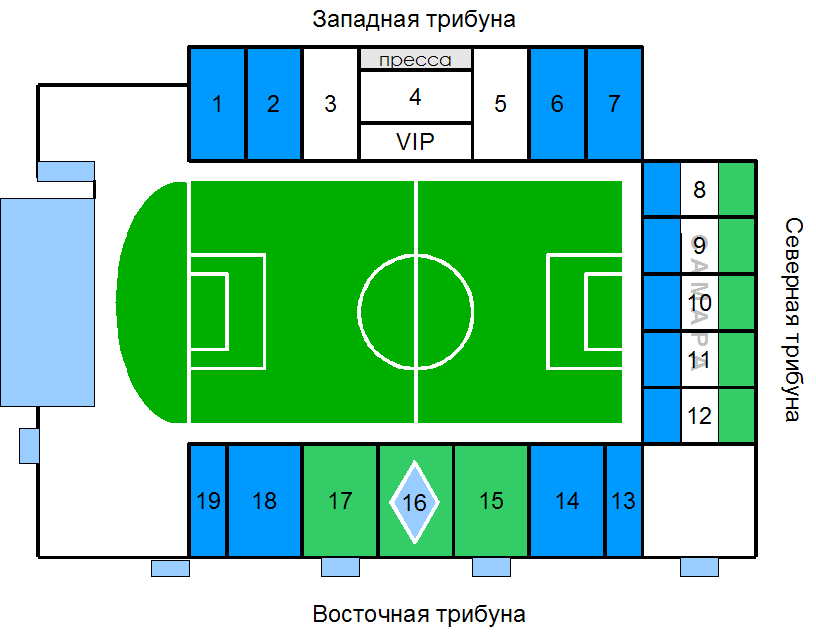
Plan of the Metallurg Stadium
