= Jeroen Simaeys =

Belgian footballer

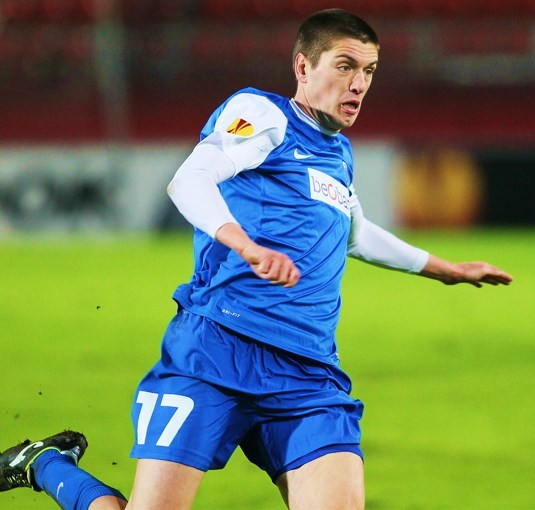
- Jeroen Simaeys (2014)

Personal information
- Full name: Jeroen Simaeys
- Date of birth: 12 May 1985 (age 41)
- Place of birth: Mechelen, Belgium
- Height: 1.93 m (6 ft 4 in)
- Positions: Centre back; defensive midfielder

Youth career
- Butsel
- Mechelen
- OH Leuven

Senior career*
| Years | Team | Apps | (Gls) |
| 2003–2005 | OH Leuven | 46 | (7) |
| 2005–2007 | Sint-Truiden | 60 | (9) |
| 2007–2011 | Club Brugge | 111 | (11) |
| 2011–2014 | Genk | 61 | (3) |
| 2014–2016 | Krylia Sovetov Samara | 35 | (1) |
| 2016–2017 | OH Leuven | 15 | (2) |

International career
| 2008–2009 | Belgium | 2 | (0) |
- * Club domestic league appearances and goals

Jeroen Simaeys (Dutch pronunciation: [jəˈrun siˈmaːis]; born 12 May 1985) is a Belgian former footballer who played as a centre back. Simaeys suffered an injury in the beginning of 2017 and was forced to retire several months later when it became apparent he would no longer be able to play professional football.

== Club career ==
He joined Genk on 30 July 2011. He has previously played for Club Brugge, Sint-Truiden, Oud-Heverlee Leuven, Butsel and Mechelen.

== National team career ==
He made his debut for the senior Belgium national football team in a friendly against Luxembourg on 18 November 2008.

He competed for Belgium at the 2008 Summer Olympics.

== Honours ==
Genk

- Belgian Cup (1): 2012–13
