= Sergei Sipatov =

Russian footballer

Personal information
- Full name: Sergei Vladimirovich Sipatov
- Date of birth: 8 February 1993 (age 33)
- Place of birth: Tolyatti, Russia
- Height: 1.80 m (5 ft 11 in)
- Position: Forward

Team information
- Current team: FC Zugdidi
- Number: 14

Youth career
- FC Krylia Sovetov Samara
- Konoplyov football academy

Senior career*
Years	Team	Apps	(Gls)
2009	FC Moscow	0	(0)
2010	PFC CSKA Moscow	0	(0)
2011–2015	FC Krylia Sovetov Samara	3	(0)
2013	→ FC Gornyak Uchaly (loan)	11	(0)
2013	→ FC Tosno (loan)	11	(2)
2015–2016	FC Spartak Dzhankoy		
2016	FC Oryol	15	(3)
2017–2018	FC Zenit Penza	23	(2)
2019–	FC Zugdidi	4	(0)

International career
2009–2010	Russia U-17	10	(2)
2011	Russia U-18	7	(4)
2011	Russia U-19	5	(2)
- * Club domestic league appearances and goals as of 14:29, 4 June 2019 (UTC)

Sergei Vladimirovich Sipatov (Russian: Серге́й Владимирович Сипатов; born 8 February 1993) is a Russian football forward. He plays for FC Zugdidi.

== Club career ==
He made his debut in the Russian Second Division for FC Gornyak Uchaly on 18 April 2013 in a game against FC Tyumen.

He made his Russian Football National League debut for FC Krylia Sovetov Samara on 19 October 2014 in a game against FC Sakhalin Yuzhno-Sakhalinsk.
