= Adis Jahović =

Macedonian footballer

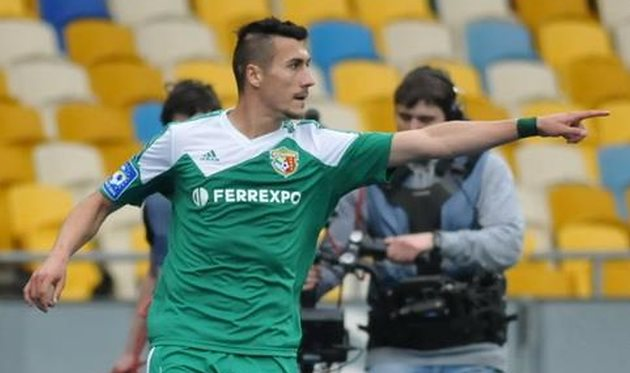
- Jahović playing for Vorskla Poltava in May 2014

Personal information
- Full name: Adis Jahović; Адис Јаховиќ
- Date of birth: 18 March 1987 (age 39)
- Place of birth: Skopje, SR Macedonia
- Height: 1.90 m (6 ft 3 in)
- Position: Striker

Team information
- Current team: Narlıdere Belediye Gençlik ve Spor

Youth career
- 1994–2006: Makedonija Gj.P.

Senior career*
Years	Team	Apps	(Gls)
2006	Napredok	2	(2)
2007	Makedonija GjP	2	(0)
2007–2008	Željezničar	2	(0)
2008	Velež	14	(5)
2009–2011	Sarajevo	47	(20)
2011–2013	Wil	40	(28)
2013	→ Zürich (loan)	15	(8)
2013–2014	Vorskla Poltava	18	(6)
2014	Rijeka	4	(1)
2014–2016	Krylia Sovetov	41	(15)
2016–2018	Göztepe	51	(35)
2018–2019	Konyaspor	43	(11)
2019–2020	Yeni Malatyaspor	18	(11)
2020	Antalyaspor	28	(7)
2021–2022	Göztepe	51	(11)
2022–2024	Bodrumspor	13	(2)
2024–	Narlıdere Belediye Gençlik ve Spor		

International career^{‡}
2012–2022	North Macedonia	19	(3)
- * Club domestic league appearances and goals as of 12 June 2024 ‡ National team caps and goals as of 14 October 2021

Adis Jahović (Macedonian: Адис Јаховиќ, born 18 March 1987) is a Macedonian footballer who plays as a forward for Turkish Regional Amateur League club Narlıdere Belediye Gençlik ve Spor.

== Club career ==
Jahović began playing football at the age of 7 with FK Makedonija Gjorče Petrov., and left to Bosnia at the age of 18. Jahović was banned for ten games for making an extremely threatening remark towards the referee of the match against Biel-Bienne.

On 29 August 2014 he made a transfer to FC Krylia Sovetov Samara. With Krylia, he won the 2014–15 Russian National Football League and got promotion to the 2015–16 Russian Premier League.

On 31 August 2016, he joined Turkish Süper Lig club Göztepe S.K. He made an impressive record scoring 35 league goals in 49 league games.

On 30 January 2018 he left Göztepe and joined Konyaspor on a 1,5 million Euro transfer. In 2019, Jahović signed with Yeni Malatyaspor.

On 1 February 2021 he joined Göztepe S.K. again. On 10 April 2021, he scored a hat-trick in a 3–2 win against Hatayspor.

== International career ==
Jahović was born in Macedonia and is of Bosniak origin. He plays for the Macedonian national football team. He debuted on 14 November 2012, during the friendly match between Macedonia and Slovenia. has earned a total of 15 caps, scoring 3 goals. In an October 2016 FIFA World Cup qualification match against Israel, he missed a 90th-minute penalty kick in a 2–1 defeat and announced international retirement soon after the match. However, 5 years later he returned to national team lineup.

== Career statistics ==
=== International goals ===
Scores and results list Macedonia's goal tally first.

#	Date	Venue	Opponent	Score	Result	Competition
1.	14 November 2012	Philip II Arena, Skopje	Slovenia	2–0	3–2	Friendly
2.	15 October 2013	Stadion Jagodina, Jagodina	Serbia	1–5	1–5	2014 World Cup qualifier
3.	9 October 2014	Philip II Arena, Skopje	Luxembourg	2–2	3–2	2016 Euro qualifier

== Honours ==
Rijeka

- Croatian Super Cup: 2014

Krylia Sovetov Samara

- Russian National Football League: 2014–15
