= Yevgeni Konyukhov =

Russian footballer

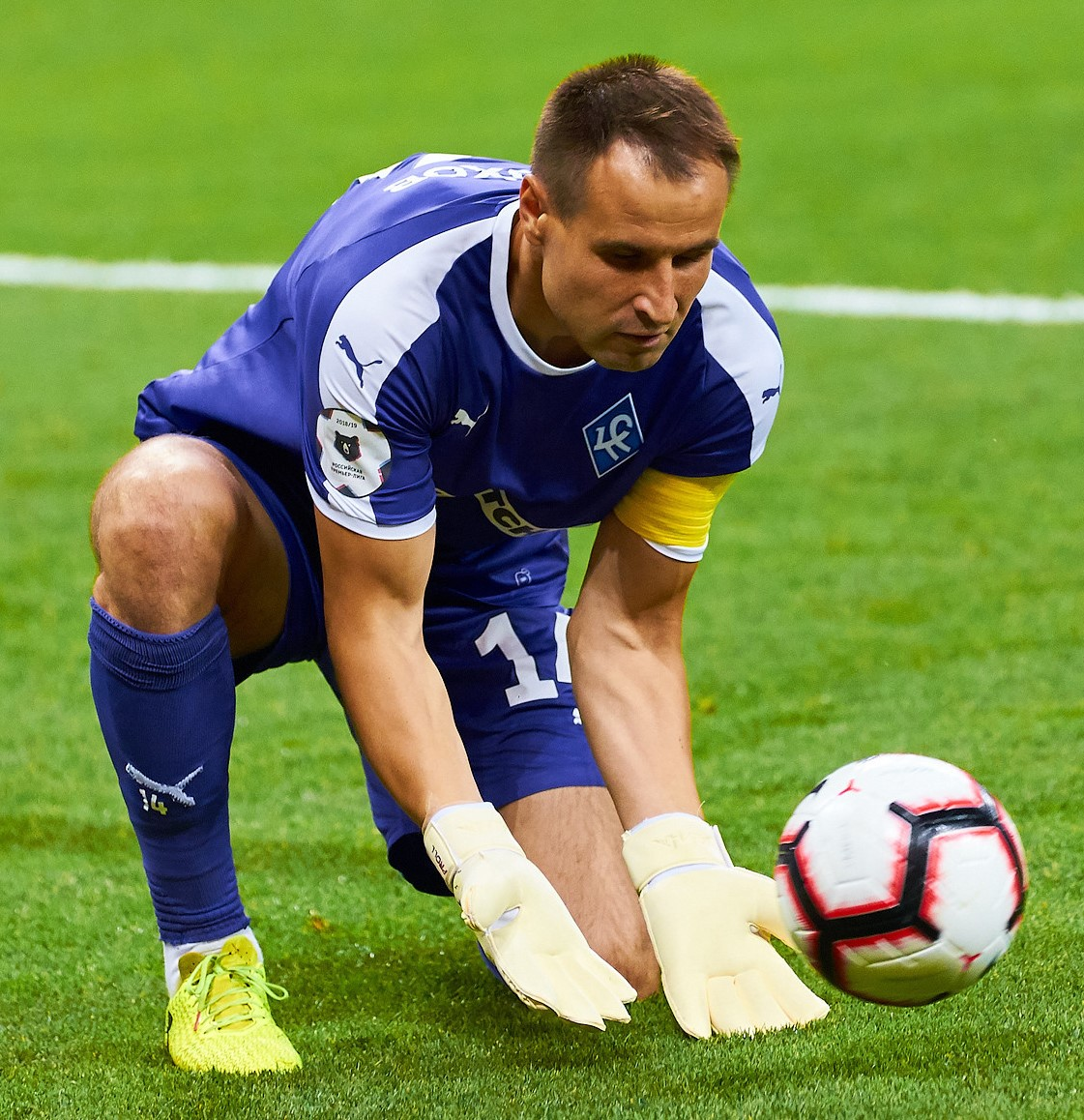
- Konyukhov with Krylia Sovetov in 2018

Personal information
- Full name: Yevgeni Anatolyevich Konyukhov
- Date of birth: 21 November 1986 (age 39)
- Place of birth: Murom, Vladimir Oblast, Russian SFSR
- Height: 1.88 m (6 ft 2 in)
- Position: Goalkeeper

Youth career
- FC Murom
- FC Metallurg Vyksa

Senior career*
Years	Team	Apps	(Gls)
2008–2009	FC Torpedo Vladimir	49	(0)
2010–2011	FC Nizhny Novgorod	65	(0)
2012	FC Sibir Novosibirsk	4	(0)
2012–2013	FC Tyumen	13	(0)
2013–2014	FC Torpedo Moscow	33	(0)
2014–2020	PFC Krylia Sovetov Samara	90	(0)
2020	FC Torpedo Moscow	13	(0)
2021	FC Tom Tomsk	12	(0)
2021	FC SKA Rostov-on-Don	18	(0)
2022	FC Neftchi Fergana	8	(0)
- * Club domestic league appearances and goals

Yevgeni Anatolyevich Konyukhov (Russian: Евгений Анатольевич Конюхов; born 21 November 1986) is a Russian former professional football player who played as a goalkeeper.

== Club career ==
He made his debut in the Russian Professional Football League for FC Torpedo Vladimir on 20 April 2008 in a game against FC MVD Rossii Moscow. He made his Russian Football National League debut for FC Nizhny Novgorod on 18 April 2010 in a game against FC Dynamo Bryansk. He made his Russian Premier League debut for PFC Krylia Sovetov Samara on 19 July 2015 in a game against FC Anzhi Makhachkala.
