= Sergei Obivalin =

Russian footballer

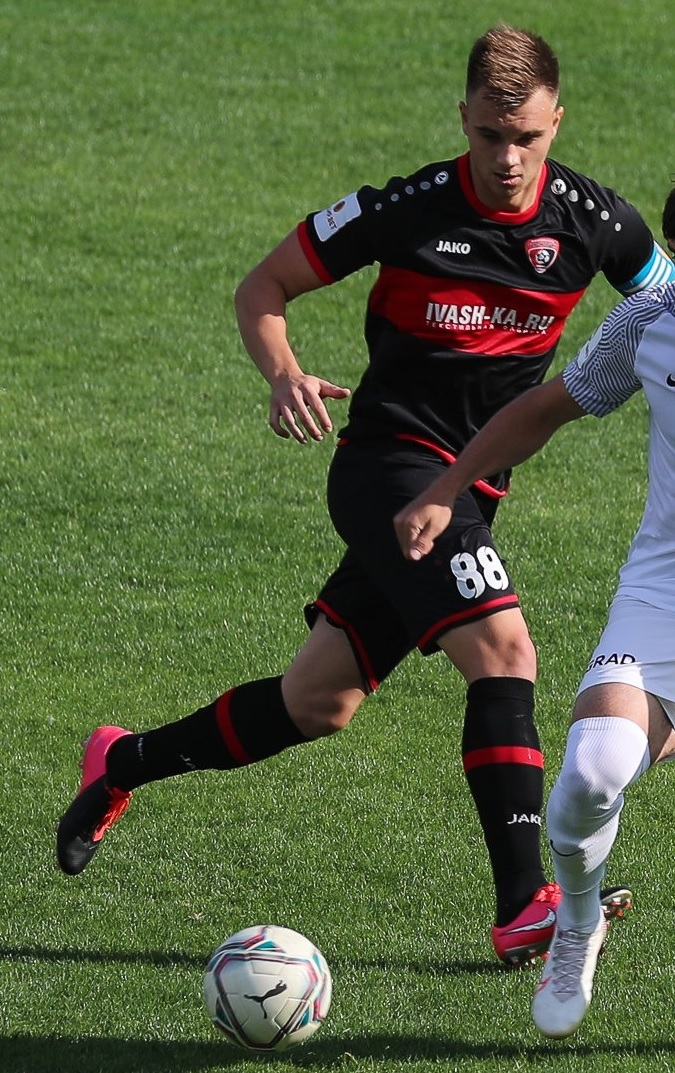
- Obivalin with Tekstilshchik Ivanovo in 2021

Personal information
- Full name: Sergei Sergeyevich Obivalin
- Date of birth: 20 March 1995 (age 31)
- Place of birth: Moscow, Russia
- Height: 1.89 m (6 ft 2 in)
- Position: Centre back

Youth career
- –2008: Yunost Moskvy-Burevestnik Moscow
- 2008–2013: FC Sportakademklub Moscow

Senior career*
Years	Team	Apps	(Gls)
2013–2016	FC Krylia Sovetov Samara	3	(0)
2015–2016	→ FC Lada-Togliatti (loan)	19	(1)
2017	FK Atlantas	14	(1)
2018–2019	FC Chernomorets Novorossiysk	15	(1)
2019	FC Saturn Ramenskoye	16	(4)
2020–2021	FC Tekstilshchik Ivanovo	59	(2)
2022	FC Tom Tomsk	12	(3)
2022–2023	FC Rotor Volgograd	27	(5)
2023–2024	FC Dynamo Vladivostok	15	(3)
2024	FC Volgar Astrakhan	9	(0)
- * Club domestic league appearances and goals as of 25 May 2024

Sergei Sergeyevich Obivalin (Russian: Сергей Сергеевич Обивалин; born 20 March 1995) is a Russian football player.

== Club career ==
He made his debut in the Russian Football National League for FC Krylia Sovetov Samara on 2 November 2014 in a game against FC SKA-Energiya Khabarovsk.
