= Alan Chochiyev =

Russian footballer

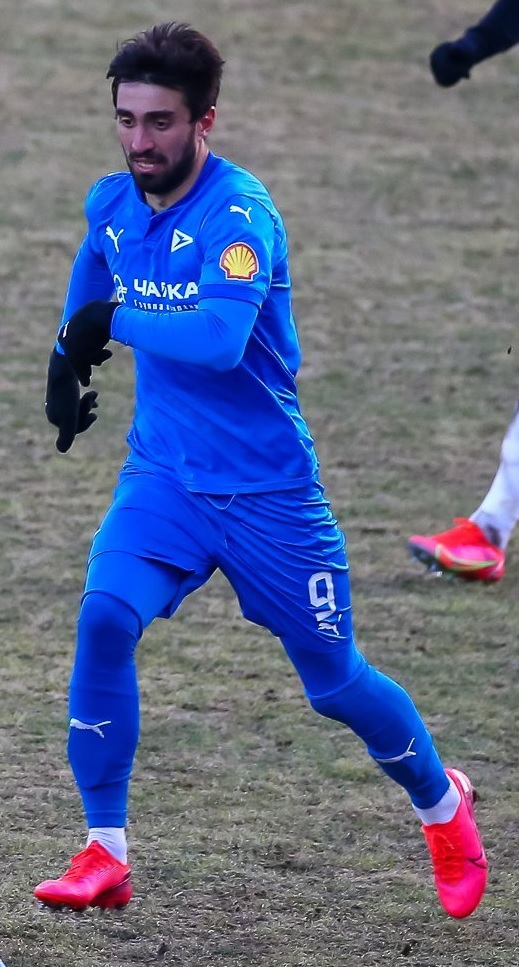
- Chochiyev with Chayka in 2021

Personal information
- Full name: Alan Slavikovich Chochiyev
- Date of birth: 7 September 1991 (age 35)
- Place of birth: Vladikavkaz, Russia
- Height: 1.80 m (5 ft 11 in)
- Position: Attacking midfielder

Youth career
- 2006–2009: Lokomotiv Moscow

Senior career*
Years	Team	Apps	(Gls)
2010–2013	Lokomotiv Moscow	0	(0)
2011–2013	→ Volgar Astrakhan (loan)	74	(7)
2014–2018	Krylia Sovetov Samara	116	(14)
2019	Dinamo Minsk	10	(0)
2019–2020	Baltika Kaliningrad	26	(0)
2020–2021	Chayka Peschanokopskoye	21	(1)
2021	Shakhter Karagandy	14	(1)
2022–2024	Alania Vladikavkaz	58	(0)
2025	Zhetysu	18	(1)

International career
2010	Russia U19	5	(1)
2012	Russia U21	2	(0)
- * Club domestic league appearances and goals as of 10 April 2026

Alan Slavikovich Chochiyev (Russian: Алан Славикович Чочиев; born 7 September 1991) is a Russian former football player. Attacking midfielder or left winger.

== Club career ==
He made his professional debut for FC Volgar-Gazprom Astrakhan on 4 April 2011 in a Russian First Division game against FC Nizhny Novgorod.

On 29 December 2013, he joined PFC Krylia Sovetov Samara. He made his Russian Premier League debut for Krylia Sovetov on 10 March 2014 in a game against FC Lokomotiv Moscow.

On 29 February 2019, he signed with Belarusian club FC Dinamo Minsk until the end of the 2019 season.

On 7 May 2021, he moved to Kazakhstan Premier League club Shakhter Karagandy.
