= Denis Tkachuk =

Russian footballer (born 1989)

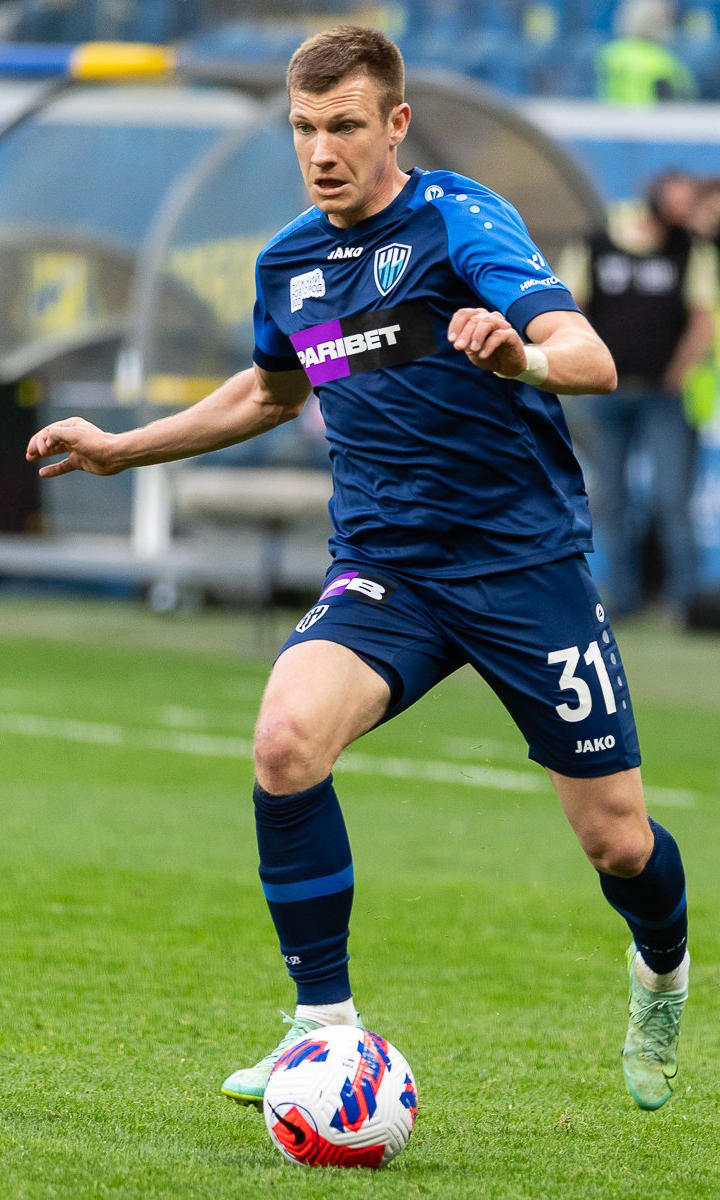
- Tkachuk with Nizhny Novgorod in 2022

Personal information
- Full name: Denis Gennadyevich Tkachuk
- Date of birth: 2 July 1989 (age 37)
- Place of birth: Belgorod, Russian SFSR
- Height: 1.76 m (5 ft 9 in)
- Positions: Midfielder; defender

Senior career*
| Years | Team | Apps | (Gls) |
| 2008–2013 | Salyut Belgorod | 141 | (25) |
| 2014 | Gazovik Orenburg | 11 | (9) |
| 2014–2015 | Krylia Sovetov Samara | 29 | (11) |
| 2015–2016 | Zenit Saint Petersburg | 7 | (0) |
| 2015–2016 | → Zenit-2 Saint Petersburg | 12 | (6) |
| 2016–2017 | Rubin Kazan | 32 | (3) |
| 2017–2019 | Krylia Sovetov Samara | 49 | (4) |
| 2019–2020 | Rotor Volgograd | 18 | (3) |
| 2020–2021 | Orenburg | 34 | (5) |
| 2021–2022 | Pari Nizhny Novgorod | 19 | (0) |
| 2022 | Kuban Krasnodar | 15 | (0) |
| 2023–2024 | Volgar Astrakhan | 40 | (2) |
| 2024–2025 | Tyumen | 31 | (4) |

International career^{‡}
| 2012 | Russia-2 | 1 | (0) |
- * Club domestic league appearances and goals as of 24 May 2025 ‡ National team caps and goals as of 15 August 2012

Denis Gennadyevich Tkachuk (Russian: Денис Геннадьевич Ткачук; born 2 July 1989) is a Russian former professional football player who played as a left midfielder or left back.

== Club career ==
Tkachuk made his Russian Premier League debut for Zenit St. Petersburg on 12 September 2015 in a game against CSKA Moscow.

On 18 January 2016, he signed a contract with Rubin Kazan.

On 29 June 2017, Tkachuk returned to Krylia Sovetov Samara, signing a 2-year contract.

On 19 August 2019, he signed with Rotor Volgograd.

In the 2020–21 season, Tkachuk's club Orenburg finished in the 2nd place in the FNL, which normally is awarded promotion to Russian Premier League, but were not licensed for it and replaced by the 3rd-placed FNL club Nizhny Novgorod. On 1 July 2021, Tkachuk moved from Orenburg to Nizhny Novgorod.

== International ==
In November 2016, he was called up to the Russia national football team for the first time for the friendly games against Qatar on 10 November 2016 and Romania on 15 November 2016.

== Career statistics ==
As of 21 May 2022

| Club | Season | League | | | Cup | | Continental | | Other | | Total | |
| Club | Season | Division | Apps | Goals | Apps | Goals | Apps | Goals | Apps | Goals | Apps | Goals |
|---|---|---|---|---|---|---|---|---|---|---|---|---|
| Salyut Belgorod | 2008 | FNL | 17 | 2 | – | | – | | – | | 17 | 2 |
| Salyut Belgorod | 2009 | FNL | 20 | 1 | 2 | 0 | – | | – | | 22 | 1 |
| Salyut Belgorod | 2010 | FNL | 26 | 0 | 1 | 0 | – | | – | | 27 | 0 |
| Salyut Belgorod | 2011–12 | PFL | 37 | 18 | 1 | 0 | – | | – | | 38 | 18 |
| Salyut Belgorod | 2012–13 | FNL | 29 | 4 | 2 | 0 | – | | – | | 31 | 4 |
| Salyut Belgorod | 2013–14 | FNL | 12 | 0 | 2 | 0 | – | | – | | 14 | 0 |
| Salyut Belgorod | Total | | 141 | 25 | 8 | 0 | 0 | 0 | 0 | 0 | 149 | 25 |
| Gazovik Orenburg | 2013–14 | FNL | 11 | 9 | – | | – | | – | | 11 | 9 |
| Krylia Sovetov Samara | 2014–15 | FNL | 29 | 11 | 4 | 3 | – | | – | | 33 | 14 |
| Zenit-2 St. Petersburg | 2015–16 | FNL | 12 | 6 | – | | – | | – | | 12 | 6 |
| Zenit St. Petersburg | 2015–16 | RPL | 7 | 0 | 2 | 3 | 0 | 0 | – | | 9 | 3 |
| Rubin Kazan | 2015–16 | RPL | 10 | 1 | – | | – | | – | | 10 | 1 |
| Rubin Kazan | 2016–17 | RPL | 22 | 2 | 2 | 0 | – | | – | | 24 | 2 |
| Rubin Kazan | Total | | 32 | 3 | 2 | 0 | 0 | 0 | 0 | 0 | 34 | 3 |
| Krylia Sovetov Samara | 2017–18 | FNL | 28 | 2 | 3 | 2 | – | | 4 (Note: Appearances in the FNL Cup) | 0 | 35 | 4 |
| Krylia Sovetov Samara | 2018–19 | RPL | 21 | 2 | 2 | 0 | – | | 2 (Note: Appearances in the relegation play-offs) | 0 | 25 | 2 |
| Krylia Sovetov Samara | Total | | 78 | 15 | 9 | 5 | 0 | 0 | 6 | 0 | 93 | 20 |
| Rotor Volgograd | 2019–20 | FNL | 18 | 3 | 0 | 0 | – | | 4 | 0 | 22 | 3 |
| Orenburg | 2020–21 | FNL | 34 | 5 | 1 | 0 | – | | – | | 35 | 5 |
| Orenburg | Total | | 45 | 14 | 1 | 0 | 0 | 0 | 0 | 0 | 46 | 14 |
| Nizhny Novgorod | 2021–22 | RPL | 19 | 0 | 2 | 0 | – | | – | | 21 | 0 |
| Career total | | | 352 | 66 | 24 | 8 | 0 | 0 | 10 | 0 | 386 | 74 |
