= 2014–15 Russian Football National League =

Russian National Football League
- Season: 2014–15
- Champions: Krylia Sovetov
- Promoted: Krylia Sovetov; Anzhi Makhachkala
- Relegated: Sakhalin Yuzhno-Sakhalinsk; Khimik Dzerzhinsk; Dynamo St.Petersburg
- Matches: 306
- Goals: 740 (2.42 per match)
- Top goalscorer: Yannick Boli (15)

The 2014–15 Russian National Football League was the 23rd season of Russia's second-tier football league since the dissolution of the Soviet Union. The season began on 6 July 2014 and ended on 30 May 2015.

== Teams ==
Location of the teams participating in the 2014–15 season

== League table ==
Pos	Team	Pld	W	D	L	GF	GA	GD	Pts	Promotion or relegation
1	Krylia Sovetov Samara (P)	34	22	7	5	54	19	+35	73	Promotion to Premier League
2	Anzhi Makhachkala (P)	34	22	5	7	60	22	+38	71	Promotion to Premier League
3	Tosno	34	20	5	9	50	36	+14	65	Qualification for promotion play-offs
4	Tom Tomsk	34	18	10	6	57	34	+23	64	Qualification for promotion play-offs
5	Gazovik Orenburg	34	15	13	6	52	31	+21	58	
6	Shinnik Yaroslavl	34	12	17	5	44	33	+11	53	
7	Volgar Astrakhan	34	13	13	8	48	39	+9	52	
8	Yenisey Krasnoyarsk	34	11	9	14	39	42	−3	42 (Note: Head-to-head points: Yenisey 11 pts, Tyumen 8 pts, Luch-Energiya 7 pts, Sibir 7 pts. Luch-Energiya is ahead of Sibir on head-to-head goal difference: Luch-Energiya 4–6, Sibir 5–10.)	
9	Tyumen	34	11	9	14	41	38	+3	42	
10	Luch-Energiya Vladivostok	34	11	9	14	40	46	−6	42	
11	Sibir Novosibirsk	34	11	9	14	35	46	−11	42	
12	Sokol Saratov	34	10	11	13	38	41	−3	41	
13	Volga Nizhny Novgorod	34	12	4	18	44	57	−13	40	
14	SKA-Khabarovsk	34	8	13	13	32	46	−14	37 (Note: Head-to-head record: SKA – Baltika 2–1, Baltika – SKA 1–1.)	
15	Baltika Kaliningrad	34	8	13	13	25	37	−12	37	
16	Sakhalin Yuzhno-Sakhalinsk (R)	34	9	8	17	28	50	−22	35	Relegation to Professional Football League
17	Khimik Dzerzhinsk (R)	34	7	6	21	35	59	−24	27	Relegation to Professional Football League
18	Dynamo St. Petersburg (R)	34	2	7	25	18	63	−45	13	Relegation to Professional Football League

Source: FNL, Soccerway
Rules for classification: 1st points; 2nd matches won; 3rd head-to-head (points, matches won, goal difference, goals scored, away goals scored); 4th goal difference; 5th goals scored; 6th away goals scored
(P) Promoted; (R) Relegated

== Results ==
Home \ Away	ANZ	BAL	DSP	GAZ	KHI	KRY	LUE	SAK	SHI	SIB	SKA	SOK	TOM	TOS	TYU	VNN	VOL	YEN
Anzhi Makhachkala		0–0	5–1	2–1	2–0	2–1	2–0	1–0	1–1	1–3	1–1	3–0	6–0	1–0	3–1	2–0	2–0	5–1
Baltika Kaliningrad	2–3		1–0	2–2	1–0	0–2	1–2	1–0	1–1	1–0	1–1	1–1	1–2	0–2	1–1	2–1	0–0	1–1
Dynamo St. Petersburg	0–2	0–2		0–2	1–0	0–4	0–2	0–1	1–1	2–2	1–2	0–3	0–1	1–3	0–1	0–1	1–2	1–0
Gazovik Orenburg	1–0	1–0	2–1		2–0	0–1	0–2	0–0	1–1	1–1	1–1	1–1	1–1	2–2	2–1	5–0	3–2	1–1
Khimik Dzerzhinsk	0–0	2–0	2–1	0–3		0–3	2–3	1–2	1–2	2–0	1–0	1–3	2–0	2–2	2–2	2–3	2–3	1–3
Krylia Sovetov Samara	1–0	2–0	1–1	1–0	0–0		2–2	5–3	1–1	2–1	1–0	2–1	2–1	0–2	2–1	1–0	1–1	1–0
Luch-Energiya Vladivostok	1–2	1–1	2–0	2–2	1–0	0–5		1–1	1–2	2–1	1–1	0–1	0–0	4–1	1–1	1–3	2–1	0–1
Sakhalin Yuzhno-Sakhalinsk	0–3	0–0	2–0	0–0	0–1	0–3	2–1		0–1	0–1	1–0	1–0	0–4	0–3	0–0	2–3	2–2	1–0
Shinnik Yaroslavl	0–1	2–1	2–1	0–1	2–1	0–0	1–1	1–1		1–0	2–0	2–2	0–0	2–0	2–0	1–1	1–1	1–1
Sibir Novosibirsk	0–2	2–0	0–0	2–1	1–1	0–2	1–0	1–3	3–1		2–2	0–2	1–1	2–1	1–0	4–3	1–0	0–0
SKA-Khabarovsk	1–1	2–0	3–1	1–3	2–1	1–0	0–0	0–1	2–2	0–0		0–0	2–3	1–2	1–1	2–1	1–0	3–1
Sokol Saratov	2–0	1–1	1–1	2–2	1–2	0–1	1–2	1–0	1–4	0–2	2–2		1–1	1–2	2–1	1–0	1–0	0–0
Tom Tomsk	1–0	0–1	5–1	0–2	3–0	1–0	3–1	2–2	4–0	1–1	1–0	2–1		2–2	1–0	1–1	2–2	0–2
Tosno	1–0	1–0	2–1	0–2	3–1	1–0	2–1	1–0	0–0	2–0	2–0	2–1	0–1		1–0	1–0	2–4	3–1
Tyumen	0–1	3–0	0–0	1–4	3–1	0–1	0–1	5–1	0–0	4–1	2–0	1–0	1–2	2–1		2–1	0–1	2–0
Volga Nizhny Novgorod	1–3	0–0	0–0	0–1	2–1	0–4	2–1	3–0	1–5	2–0	6–0	2–1	0–5	3–1	1–2		0–2	3–2
Volgar Astrakhan	0–3	1–1	3–0	2–1	2–2	0–0	2–1	2–1	1–1	2–0	4–0	1–1	1–3	0–0	2–2	1–0		0–0
Yenisey Krasnoyarsk	1–0	0–1	3–1	1–1	3–1	0–1	2–0	3–1	2–1	4–1	0–0	1–2	0–3	1–2	1–1	1–0	2–3	

Source: Soccerway
Legend: Blue = home team win; Yellow = draw; Red = away team win.

== Statistics ==
=== Scoring ===
- First goal of the season: Stanislav Prokofyev for Luch-Energiya against SKA-Energiya Khabarovsk (6 July 2014)

=== Top goalscorers ===
As of 30 May 2015

Rank	Player	Team	Goals
1	(Ivory Coast) Yannick Boli	Anzhi Makhachkala	15
2	(Russia) Igor Koronov	Gazovik Orenburg	14
3	(North Macedonia) Adis Jahović	Krylia Sovetov	12
3	(Russia) Stanislav Prokofyev	Luch-Energiya / Tosno	12
3	(Armenia) Artur Sarkisov	Volga	12
6	(Russia) Eldar Nizamutdinov	Shinnik Yaroslavl	11
6	(Russia) Sergey Samodin	Shinnik Yaroslavl	11
6	(Russia) Denis Tkachuk	Krylia Sovetov	11
