= List of Russian football transfers summer 2016 =

This is a list of Russian football transfers in the 2016 summer transfer window by club. Only clubs of the 2016–17 Russian Premier League are included.

== Russian Premier League 2016–17 ==
=== Amkar Perm ===
In: Note: Flags indicate national team as defined under FIFA eligibility rules; some limited exceptions apply. Players may hold more than one non-FIFA nationality.

No.	Pos.	Nation	Player
2	DF	SRB	Aleksandar Miljković (from (Croatia) RNK Split)
6	DF	GUI	Sékou Condé (from (Ukraine) Olimpik Donetsk)
7	FW	UKR	Anton Shynder (from (Ukraine) Shakhtar Donetsk)
9	FW	AUT	Darko Bodul (from (Scotland) Dundee United)
27	MF	RUS	Mikhail Kostyukov (from Volga Nizhny Novgorod)
28	FW	RUS	Stanislav Prokofyev (from SKA-Khabarovsk)
44	MF	RUS	Viktor Urensky
47	FW	RUS	Maksim Zhukovsky
92	DF	RUS	Danil Smirnov
97	DF	RUS	Khavazh Aushev (from Angusht Nazran)
98	GK	RUS	Aleksandr Budakov (from (Belarus) Isloch Minsk Raion)

Out: Note: Flags indicate national team as defined under FIFA eligibility rules; some limited exceptions apply. Players may hold more than one non-FIFA nationality.

No.	Pos.	Nation	Player
1	GK	RUS	Roman Gerus (to Arsenal Tula)
7	MF	BUL	Georgi Peev (retired)
9	FW	RUS	Aleksandr Prudnikov (to Orenburg)
10	FW	NGA	Bright Dike (released)
17	MF	RUS	David Dzakhov (on loan to Shinnik Yaroslavl)
18	FW	RUS	Aleksei Kurzenyov
21	DF	RUS	Dmitri Belorukov (to Dynamo Moscow)
36	MF	RUS	Aleksandr Pantsyrev
37	DF	RUS	Ilya Pushkaryov
41	GK	RUS	Vladimir Otmakhov
42	MF	RUS	Vsevolod Kozhin
45	DF	RUS	Andrei Pridyuk (to Chayka Peschanokopskoye)
47	MF	RUS	Daniil Frentsel
49	MF	RUS	Igor Paramonov
55	DF	RUS	Daniil Petrov
58	GK	RUS	Ivan Srednyakov
60	FW	RUS	Andrey Anfyorov
67	MF	RUS	Roman Bulak
79	FW	RUS	Bodiy Borchashvili
91	DF	UKR	Bohdan Butko (end of loan from (Ukraine) Shakhtar Donetsk)
98	MF	RUS	Igor Murashov (to Zenit-Izhevsk)
99	FW	UKR	Oleh Mishchenko (on loan to (Ukraine) Illichivets Mariupol)
—	MF	RUS	Vasili Aleynikov (to Pskov-747, previously on loan)
—	MF	RUS	Ivan Belikov (to Afips Afipsky, previously on loan to Lokomotiv Liski)

=== Anzhi Makhachkala ===
In: Note: Flags indicate national team as defined under FIFA eligibility rules; some limited exceptions apply. Players may hold more than one non-FIFA nationality.

No.	Pos.	Nation	Player
1	GK	RUS	David Yurchenko (from Ufa, previously on loan)
10	MF	CRO	Ivo Iličević (from (Germany) Hamburger SV)
13	MF	GHA	Mohammed Rabiu (from Kuban Krasnodar)
15	MF	UKR	Dmytro Shcherbak (from Kuban Krasnodar)
17	MF	RUS	Svyatoslav Georgiyevsky (from Kuban Krasnodar)
21	DF	FRA	Cédric Yambéré (on loan from (France) Bordeaux)
22	MF	RUS	Sergey Karetnik (from Kuban Krasnodar)
24	DF	RUS	Sergei Parshivlyuk (from Spartak Moscow)
26	DF	BRA	Xandão (from Kuban Krasnodar)
28	FW	UKR	Pylyp Budkivskyi (on loan from (Ukraine) Shakhtar Donetsk)
31	GK	RUS	Aleksandr Belenov (from Kuban Krasnodar)
44	DF	RUS	Bagautdin Rikmatullayev
65	DF	RUS	Rustam Isayev
66	MF	RUS	Amirkhan Temukov
68	MF	RUS	Roman Khodakovsky
69	GK	RUS	Yegor Sedov (from own academy)
76	GK	RUS	Nikita Repin (from Rotor Volgograd academy)
86	MF	RUS	Suleyman Dzhabrailov
91	FW	RUS	Pavel Yakovlev (from Spartak Moscow)
98	MF	RUS	Zalimkhan Yusupov
99	MF	FRA	Gabriel Obertan (from (England) Newcastle United)

Out: Note: Flags indicate national team as defined under FIFA eligibility rules; some limited exceptions apply. Players may hold more than one non-FIFA nationality.

No.	Pos.	Nation	Player
5	DF	RUS	Aleksandr Zhirov (to Tom Tomsk)
27	GK	RUS	Mekhti Dzhenetov (on loan to Baltika Kaliningrad)
55	GK	RUS	Yevgeny Pomazan (to Kuban Krasnodar)
56	DF	RUS	Mikhail Reshetnyak
63	FW	RUS	Dordzhi Sangadzhiyev (to (Uzbekistan) Navbahor Namangan)
65	DF	RUS	Abubakar Ustarkhanov
68	MF	RUS	Goytemir Umarov
71	GK	RUS	Mukharbek Burayev
75	FW	RUS	Tagir Musalov
87	MF	RUS	Ilya Maksimov (to Arsenal Tula)
96	FW	RUS	Dzhamal Dibirgadzhiyev (on loan to (Portugal) Fátima)
99	FW	RUS	Islamnur Abdulavov (to Ufa)
—	GK	RUS	Aleksandr Krivoruchko (to SKA-Khabarovsk, previously on loan to Tom Tomsk)
—	DF	RUS	Murad Kurbanov (released, previously on loan to Khimik Dzerzhinsk)
—	DF	RUS	Yuri Udunyan (to Legion-Dynamo Makhachkala, previously on loan to Khimik Dzerzhinsk)
—	DF	RUS	Andrey Yeshchenko (to Spartak Moscow, previously on loan to Dynamo Moscow)

=== Arsenal Tula ===
In: Note: Flags indicate national team as defined under FIFA eligibility rules; some limited exceptions apply. Players may hold more than one non-FIFA nationality.

No.	Pos.	Nation	Player
1	GK	RUS	Roman Gerus (from Amkar Perm)
8	MF	RUS	Aleksandr Sheshukov (from Lokomotiv Moscow)
11	FW	RUS	Khyzyr Appayev (from Orenburg)
16	MF	GHA	Emmanuel Frimpong (free agent)
17	MF	RUS	Ernest Lukiv (from Yenisey Krasnoyarsk)
18	MF	RUS	Nikita Burmistrov (from Krasnodar)
22	DF	SVK	Lukáš Tesák (from (Kazakhstan) Kairat)
21	DF	COL	Jherson Vergara (on loan from (Italy) Milan)
23	FW	RUS	Ruslan Mukhametshin (from Mordovia Saransk)
29	DF	RUS	Aleksandr Gorbatyuk (from Sokol Saratov)
30	FW	RUS	Dzhamshed Maksumov (from (Tajikistan) Istiklol)
33	MF	RUS	Igor Veprikov
34	DF	RUS	Aleksandr Osipov (from UOR #5 Yegoryevsk)
35	GK	RUS	Nikita Makeyev (from Oryol)
36	GK	RUS	Mikhail Levashov (from Arsenal-2 Tula)
37	DF	RUS	Pavel Kaloshin (from Khimki-M)
38	DF	RUS	Rustam Normatov (from Arsenal-2 Tula)
39	MF	RUS	Igor Gorbatenko (from Krylia Sovetov Samara, previously on loan)
40	DF	RUS	Pavel Borisov (from Arsenal-2 Tula)
41	DF	RUS	Dmitri Doronin (from UOR #5 Yegoryevsk)
44	FW	RUS	Roman Izotov (from Arsenal-2 Tula)
45	FW	RUS	Arkadi Lobzin (from Arsenal-2 Tula)
47	DF	RUS	Andrius Rukas
48	MF	RUS	Roman Pekulov
49	MF	RUS	Nikita Golub
50	GK	RUS	Aleksandr Puchkov (from Arsenal-2 Tula)
51	GK	RUS	Vitali Ushakov (from UOR #5 Yegoryevsk)
52	DF	RUS	Ilya Klementyev (from UOR #5 Yegoryevsk)
55	MF	RUS	Vladimir Mikhaylov (from Arsenal-2 Tula)
57	MF	RUS	Artyom Mingazov (from Arsenal-2 Tula)
58	MF	RUS	Yaroslav Ivakin (from UOR #5 Yegoryevsk)
59	MF	RUS	Kirill Chernov
60	MF	RUS	Andrei Potapov (from UOR #5 Yegoryevsk)
63	MF	RUS	Vladimir Pestryachyov
65	MF	RUS	Ilya Savkin
66	DF	RUS	Yevgeni Yezhov (from Torpedo Moscow)
69	FW	RUS	Sergei Stepanov
70	FW	RUS	Valeri Alshanskiy (from Arsenal-2 Tula)
72	FW	RUS	Aleksandr Zharinov
74	DF	RUS	Ilya Salnikov (from Aventa-2000 Moscow)
78	MF	RUS	Ilya Maksimov (from Anzhi Makhachkala)
80	MF	RUS	Stepan Rebenko (from Zenit St. Petersburg)
80	MF	RUS	Aleksandr Gordiyenko
81	MF	RUS	Dmitri Shilov (from Arsenal-2 Tula)
82	GK	RUS	Vladislav Suslov (from Rostov)
84	MF	RUS	Oleg Vlasov (from Mordovia Saransk)
85	GK	RUS	Maksim Staroverov (from Arsenal-2 Tula)
87	MF	RUS	Aleksandr Kotenko (from Arsenal-2 Tula)
89	MF	RUS	Sergei Shapovalov (from Dynamo Kirov)
90	MF	RUS	Nikolai Izvekov (from Arsenal-2 Tula)
92	MF	RUS	Aleksei Kiselyov (from (Armenia) Mika)
94	DF	RUS	Aleksandr Matrenov (from Arsenal-2 Tula)
95	DF	RUS	Artur Farion (from Arsenal-2 Tula)
96	DF	RUS	Yanis Linda (from Lokomotiv Liski)
97	FW	RUS	Vladislav Kormishin (from Sibir-2 Novosibirsk)

Out: Note: Flags indicate national team as defined under FIFA eligibility rules; some limited exceptions apply. Players may hold more than one non-FIFA nationality.

No.	Pos.	Nation	Player
9	FW	MNE	Goran Vujović (to (Montenegro) Budućnost Podgorica)
10	MF	UKR	Vitaliy Fedotov
11	MF	RUS	Aleksei Bazanov (to Tekstilshchik Ivanovo)
15	DF	RUS	Aleksandr Stolyarenko (on loan to Tambov, previously from Sokol Saratov)
16	GK	RUS	Sergei Kotov
19	MF	RUS	Artyom Dudolev (to Sokol Saratov)
21	MF	RUS	Maksim Mashnev (on loan to Luch-Energiya Vladivostok)
27	MF	RUS	Sergei Ignatyev (on loan to Sochi)
33	GK	RUS	Igor Kot (to Mordovia Saransk)
54	FW	RUS	Aleksandr Zakarlyuka (to Zenit Penza)
—	MF	RUS	Pavel Deobald (to Mordovia Saransk, previously on loan to Torpedo Armavir)

=== CSKA Moscow ===
In: Note: Flags indicate national team as defined under FIFA eligibility rules; some limited exceptions apply. Players may hold more than one non-FIFA nationality.

No.	Pos.	Nation	Player
8	MF	BUL	Georgi Milanov (end of loan to (Switzerland) Grasshoppers)
9	FW	CIV	Lacina Traoré (on loan from (France) Monaco)
11	MF	RUS	Aleksei Ionov (on loan from Dynamo Moscow)
23	FW	SWE	Carlos Strandberg (end of loan to (Sweden) AIK)
71	MF	RUS	Nayair Tiknizyan (from own academy)
73	DF	RUS	Sergei Yevtushenko (on loan from Dynamo Moscow)
74	DF	RUS	Aleksandr Volkov (from own academy)
76	MF	RUS	Artyom Avanesyan (from own academy)
81	MF	RUS	Vladimir Kabakhidze (from own academy)
83	MF	RUS	Nikita Matskharashvili (from own academy)

Out: Note: Flags indicate national team as defined under FIFA eligibility rules; some limited exceptions apply. Players may hold more than one non-FIFA nationality.

No.	Pos.	Nation	Player
5	DF	RUS	Viktor Vasin (on loan to Ufa)
8	FW	RUS	Kirill Panchenko (on loan to Dynamo Moscow)
15	MF	RUS	Roman Shirokov (retired)
17	MF	RUS	Sergei Tkachyov (on loan to Krylia Sovetov Samara)
18	MF	NGA	Ahmed Musa (to (England) Leicester City)
20	MF	RUS	Amir Natkho (to FC Krasnodar)
37	DF	RUS	Denis Masyutin (to Zenit Penza)
39	DF	RUS	Vyacheslav Karavayev (to (Czech Republic) Sparta Prague, previously on loan to (Czech Republic) Jablonec)
51	MF	RUS	Aleksandr Ektov (to Dolgoprudny)
71	FW	RUS	Ilya Zuyev
73	MF	RUS	Dmitri Sokolov (to Kaluga)
96	MF	RUS	Renat Yusupov (to Ufa)
99	FW	NGA	Aaron Samuel Olanare (end of loan from (China) Guangzhou R&F)
—	DF	RUS	Nikita Chernov (on loan to Yenisey Krasnoyarsk, previously on loan to Baltika Kaliningrad)
—	DF	RUS	Pyotr Ten (to Tom Tomsk, previously on loan)
—	MF	RUS	Aleksandr Makarov (on loan to Tosno, previously on loan to Baltika Kaliningrad)
—	MF	RUS	Dmitri Yefremov (on loan to FC Orenburg, previously on loan to (Czech Republic) Slovan Liberec)
—	FW	SWE	Alibek Aliev (on loan to (Sweden) GAIS, previously on loan to (Finland) Jaro)
—	FW	RUS	Armen Ambartsumyan (to Mordovia Saransk, previously on loan to Torpedo Armavir)
—	FW	RUS	Konstantin Bazelyuk (on loan to (Portugal) Estoril, previously on loan to SKA-Energiya Khabarovsk)
—	FW	RUS	Nikolai Dergachyov (to Sokol Saratov, previously on loan to Dolgoprudny)

=== Krasnodar ===
In: Note: Flags indicate national team as defined under FIFA eligibility rules; some limited exceptions apply. Players may hold more than one non-FIFA nationality.

No.	Pos.	Nation	Player
2	MF	RUS	Marat Izmailov (free agent)
3	DF	BRA	Naldo (from (Portugal) Sporting Lisbon)
4	DF	BLR	Alyaksandr Martynovich (end of loan to Ural Sverdlovsk Oblast)
16	GK	RUS	Stanislav Kritsyuk (from (Portugal) Braga, previously on loan)
20	MF	RUS	Amir Natkho (from CSKA Moscow)
32	DF	RUS	Vasili Cherov (end of loan to Khimki)
34	MF	RUS	Kamil Zakirov
37	DF	RUS	Grigori Ziganshin
40	DF	RUS	Andrei Ivashin
42	DF	RUS	Dmitri Bubenin
44	MF	RUS	Konstantin Samarenkin
49	FW	RUS	Dmitri Bakay (end of loan to Biolog-Novokubansk)
51	GK	RUS	Ivan Salnikov (from Tom Tomsk academy)
53	MF	RUS	Aleksandr Chernikov
55	DF	POL	Artur Jędrzejczyk (end of loan to (Poland) Legia Warsaw)
61	DF	RUS	Ilya Martynov
65	DF	RUS	Nikolai Bochko
67	FW	RUS	Maksim Kutovoy
68	MF	RUS	Robert Babertsyan
70	MF	GEO	Tornike Okriashvili (from (Belgium) Genk)
72	FW	RUS	Rustam Khalnazarov
77	MF	BFA	Charles Kaboré (from Kuban Krasnodar, previously on loan)
81	MF	RUS	Leon Sabua
86	FW	RUS	Valeri Manko
96	FW	RUS	Dmitri Yaskov

Out: Note: Flags indicate national team as defined under FIFA eligibility rules; some limited exceptions apply. Players may hold more than one non-FIFA nationality.

No.	Pos.	Nation	Player
3	DF	NOR	Stefan Strandberg (on loan to (Germany) Hannover 96)
15	DF	UZB	Nikolay Markov (to Kuban Krasnodar)
27	DF	ISL	Ragnar Sigurðsson (to (England) Fulham)
31	GK	UKR	Andriy Dykan (retired)
40	FW	RUS	Alan Koroyev (to Kolomna)
42	DF	RUS	Mikhail Tikhonov (to Yenisey Krasnoyarsk)
47	MF	RUS	Ilya Zhigulyov (on loan to (Moldova) Milsami Orhei)
48	MF	RUS	Aleksandr Marchenko (on loan to Spartak Nalchik)
51	GK	RUS	Denis Kavlinov (on loan to Dynamo St. Petersburg)
53	FW	RUS	Pavel Marushko (to Syzran-2003)
56	FW	RUS	Ilya Belous (on loan to (Moldova) Milsami Orhei)
59	DF	RUS	Nikita Katayev
63	FW	RUS	Nikolai Komlichenko (on loan to (Czech Republic) Slovan Liberec)
68	FW	RUS	Andrei Batyutin (to Ufa)
72	DF	RUS	Daniil Bochkaryov (to Biolog-Novokubansk)
79	DF	RUS	Batraz Gurtsiyev
80	DF	RUS	Vladislav Sklyar (to Biolog-Novokubansk)
81	DF	RUS	Yevgeni Nesterenko (to Afips Afipsky)
83	DF	RUS	Maksim Starkov (on loan to Dynamo St. Petersburg)
96	MF	RUS	Ilya Borisov (on loan to Armavir)
99	FW	RUS	Vladislav Bragin
—	MF	RUS	Oleg Lanin (on loan to Yenisey Krasnoyarsk, previously on loan to Baltika Kaliningrad)
—	FW	RUS	Ruslan Bolov (on loan to Fakel Voronezh, previously on loan to Volgar Astrakhan)
—	FW	RUS	Nikita Burmistrov (to Arsenal Tula, previously on loan to Ural Sverdlovsk Oblast)

=== Krylia Sovetov Samara ===
In: Note: Flags indicate national team as defined under FIFA eligibility rules; some limited exceptions apply. Players may hold more than one non-FIFA nationality.

No.	Pos.	Nation	Player
1	GK	RUS	Maksim Pavlov (from KAMAZ Naberezhnye Chelny)
2	MF	RUS	Yevgeni Bashkirov (from Tom Tomsk)
10	FW	ITA	Cristian Pasquato (on loan from (Italy) Juventus)
14	MF	FRA	Yohan Mollo (from (France) Saint-Étienne, previously on loan)
19	DF	TRI	Sheldon Bateau (from (Belgium) Mechelen, previously on loan)
21	MF	RUS	Vyacheslav Zinkov (from Zenit St. Petersburg)
23	FW	NGA	Jerry Mbakogu (on loan from (Italy) Carpi)
34	DF	RUS	Timofei Margasov (from Rostov)
47	FW	RUS	Vladimir Rasskazchikov
49	MF	RUS	Nikita Kireyev (from Dynamo Moscow)
53	DF	RUS	Ivan Stolyarov (from own academy)
54	GK	RUS	Vladimir Teryokhin
70	MF	RUS	Emrakh Nabatov
76	DF	RUS	Denis Lozovik
77	MF	RUS	Sergei Tkachyov (on loan from CSKA Moscow)
78	MF	RUS	Gennadi Kiselyov (from Lada-Togliatti)
79	DF	RUS	Ilya Yermolayev
81	GK	RUS	Bogdan Ovsyannikov
92	MF	RUS	Aleksandr Dmitryuk
94	MF	RUS	Viktor Gryazin
97	DF	RUS	Maksim Vasilyev
99	FW	RUS	Yevgeni Slanko

Out: Note: Flags indicate national team as defined under FIFA eligibility rules; some limited exceptions apply. Players may hold more than one non-FIFA nationality.

No.	Pos.	Nation	Player
1	GK	RUS	Miroslav Lobantsev (end of loan from Lokomotiv Moscow)
5	MF	RUS	Georgy Gabulov (to Orenburg)
16	MF	BEL	Jeroen Simaeys (to (Belgium) OHL)
18	FW	MKD	Adis Jahović (to (Turkey) Göztepe)
20	MF	RUS	Aleksei Pomerko (to Orenburg)
27	FW	CIV	Junior Ahissan (to (Ukraine) Dynamo Kyiv)
43	MF	RUS	Oleg Roganov (to (Moldova) Dacia Chișinău)
44	DF	RUS	Semyon Biryukov
55	MF	RUS	Andrei Kalinin
66	MF	RUS	Saveliy Kozlov
70	MF	RUS	Danila Popov
71	GK	RUS	Danila Yermakov (to Rostov)
90	DF	RUS	Taras Burlak (end of loan from Rubin Kazan)
91	MF	RUS	Pavel Yakovlev (end of loan from Spartak Moscow)
93	DF	RUS	Vitali Kalenkovich (to Baltika Kaliningrad)
96	DF	RUS	Kirill Mironov
97	MF	RUS	Daniil Melikhov (to (Latvia) Daugavpils)
99	DF	RUS	Aleksei Makushkin
—	DF	RUS	Anton Bocharov (to Nosta Novotroitsk, previously on loan)
—	DF	RUS	Sergei Obivalin (to Sportakademklub Moscow, previously on loan to Lada-Togliatti)
—	MF	RUS	Igor Gorbatenko (to Arsenal Tula, previously on loan)
—	MF	AZE	Emin Makhmudov (to (Portugal) Boavista, previously on loan to Mordovia Saransk)
—	MF	RUS	Maksim Paliyenko (to Tosno, previously on loan to Zenit St. Petersburg)

=== Lokomotiv Moscow ===
In: Note: Flags indicate national team as defined under FIFA eligibility rules; some limited exceptions apply. Players may hold more than one non-FIFA nationality.

No.	Pos.	Nation	Player
9	FW	RUS	Igor Portnyagin (from Rubin Kazan)
27	MF	RUS	Igor Denisov (on loan from Dynamo Moscow)
28	DF	RUS	Boris Rotenberg (from Dynamo Moscow)
34	DF	RUS	Stanislav Magkeyev
41	GK	RUS	Miroslav Lobantsev (end of loan to Krylia Sovetov Samara)
88	MF	CGO	Delvin N'Dinga (from (France) Monaco, previously on loan)
71	DF	RUS	Nikolai Poyarkov
76	MF	RUS	Maksim Kalachevsky
95	DF	RUS	Aleksei Gubochkin
99	MF	RUS	Svyatoslav Muradov

Out: Note: Flags indicate national team as defined under FIFA eligibility rules; some limited exceptions apply. Players may hold more than one non-FIFA nationality.

No.	Pos.	Nation	Player
8	MF	RUS	Aleksandr Sheshukov (to Arsenal Tula)
9	MF	RUS	Maksim Grigoryev (to Rostov)
16	GK	RUS	Ilya Lantratov (to Shinnik Yaroslavl)
28	DF	SVK	Ján Ďurica (to (Turkey) Trabzonspor)
46	MF	RUS	Pavel Patsekin
50	FW	RUS	Denis Anisimov (to Vityaz Podolsk)
54	DF	RUS	Vladislav Shadrin (to Avangard Kursk)
62	MF	RUS	Artyom Antoshkin
63	DF	RUS	Denis Nikitin (to Avangard Kursk)
70	MF	RUS	Georgi Makhatadze (to Rubin Kazan)
71	DF	RUS	Aleksandr Razoryonov (to Dolgoprudny-2)
72	DF	RUS	Ratibor Gusar
77	GK	RUS	Anton Kochenkov (on loan to Tom Tomsk)
80	FW	RUS	Nikolai Kipiani (to (Cyprus) Ethnikos Achna)
90	MF	RUS	Aleksandr Dovbnya (to (Cyprus) Ethnikos Achna)
96	FW	RUS	Rifat Zhemaletdinov (to Rubin Kazan)
—	DF	RUS	Aleksandr Seraskhov (released, previously on loan to Sokol Saratov)
—	MF	MAR	Mbark Boussoufa (to (United Arab Emirates) Al Jazira, previously on loan to (Belgium) KAA Gent)

=== Orenburg ===
In: Note: Flags indicate national team as defined under FIFA eligibility rules; some limited exceptions apply. Players may hold more than one non-FIFA nationality.

No.	Pos.	Nation	Player
4	DF	CRO	Ivica Žunić (from (Ukraine) Volyn Lutsk)
6	MF	CIV	Yacouba Bamba (from (Moldova) Zaria Bălți)
7	MF	RUS	Andrei Boyko (from Gazovik-2 Orenburg)
10	FW	RUS	Anzor Sanaya (from Tom Tomsk)
13	MF	BLR	Pavel Nyakhaychyk (from Tom Tomsk)
14	FW	RUS	Anton Mikhailov (from Gazovik-2 Orenburg)
17	MF	RUS	Dmitri Yefremov (on loan from CSKA Moscow)
18	FW	RUS	Aleksandr Prudnikov (from Amkar Perm)
19	MF	RUS	Ilya Altyshev (from Gazovik-2 Orenburg)
20	MF	RUS	Aleksei Pomerko (from Krylia Sovetov Samara)
21	DF	RUS	Pavel Pikin (from Gazovik-2 Orenburg)
22	MF	RUS	Georgy Gabulov (from Krylia Sovetov Samara)
28	DF	RUS	Viktor Cheryazov (from Gazovik-2 Orenburg)
30	GK	BLR	Alyaksandr Hutar (from (Belarus) Dinamo Minsk)
34	MF	RUS	Aleksandr Katsalapov (from Ufa)
35	MF	RUS	Sergei Pikalov
36	DF	RUS	Valentin Prilepin
38	DF	RUS	Daniil Krivoruchko (from Gazovik-2 Orenburg)
40	MF	BUL	Blagoy Georgiev (from Rubin Kazan)
44	MF	RUS	Stepan Oplesnin (from Gazovik-2 Orenburg)
54	DF	RUS	Vadim Bilyukov (from Gazovik-2 Orenburg)
55	GK	RUS	Vladislav Trubitsyn (from Gazovik-2 Orenburg)
57	MF	RUS	Vladimir Pereverzev
66	MF	RUS	Sergei Mitrenko (from Gazovik-2 Orenburg)
69	FW	RUS	Aleksandr Matveychuk (from Gazovik-2 Orenburg)
70	MF	RUS	Dinar Khaybullin (from Mordovia Saransk)
71	MF	RUS	Dmitri Rudakov (from Gazovik-2 Orenburg)
77	MF	RUS	Dmitry Lesovsky (from Gazovik-2 Orenburg)
78	MF	RUS	Ilya Ivanov (from Gazovik-2 Orenburg)
81	FW	RUS	Maksim Gribanov
88	DF	RUS	Maksim Batov (on loan from Rubin Kazan)
89	MF	RUS	Stanislav Ivanov (from Gazovik-2 Orenburg)
91	DF	RUS	Denis Kaykov (from LFK Lokomotiv Moscow)
92	GK	RUS	Aleksei Kenyaykin
97	FW	RUS	Andrei Rybkin (from Gazovik-2 Orenburg)
98	GK	RUS	Vladislav Dolgopol (from Gazovik-2 Orenburg)
99	MF	RUS	Vladislav Kalinin (from Gazovik-2 Orenburg)

Out: Note: Flags indicate national team as defined under FIFA eligibility rules; some limited exceptions apply. Players may hold more than one non-FIFA nationality.

No.	Pos.	Nation	Player
3	MF	RUS	Inal Getigezhev (end of loan from Rubin Kazan)
4	DF	RUS	Almaz Askarov
7	DF	RUS	Kamalutdin Akhmedov (to Tyumen)
11	FW	RUS	Khyzyr Appayev (to Arsenal Tula)
11	FW	RUS	Ivan Markelov (to Dynamo Moscow)
17	MF	LVA	Artūrs Zjuzins (to Tambov)
22	FW	RUS	Anton Kobyalko (to SKA-Khabarovsk)
30	MF	RUS	Aleksei Druzin (to SKA-Khabarovsk)
55	GK	RUS	Dmitri Chvanov
87	FW	RUS	Nikita Satalkin (to Fakel Voronezh)

=== Rostov ===
In: Note: Flags indicate national team as defined under FIFA eligibility rules; some limited exceptions apply. Players may hold more than one non-FIFA nationality.

No.	Pos.	Nation	Player
1	GK	RUS	Ivan Komissarov (from Olimpiyets Nizhny Novgorod)
3	DF	SEN	Papa Gueye (from (Ukraine) Dnipro Dnipropetrovsk)
4	DF	RUS	Vladimir Granat (from Spartak Moscow)
9	MF	RUS	Maksim Grigoryev (from Lokomotiv Moscow)
14	MF	RUS	Valeri Yaroshenko (from Zenit St. Petersburg)
17	DF	RUS	Dmitri Skopintsev (from (Austria) Liefering)
20	FW	IRN	Sardar Azmoun (from Rubin Kazan, previously on loan)
23	DF	SVN	Miha Mevlja (from (Romania) Dinamo București)
28	MF	ROU	Andrei Prepeliță (from (Bulgaria) Ludogorets Razgrad)
32	MF	RUS	Aleksei Stokolyasov
38	MF	RUS	Ilya Maletsky
42	MF	RUS	Maksim Skrynnik
43	MF	RUS	Ismail Gasanov
47	MF	RUS	Denis Karnuta (from Aksay)
48	GK	RUS	Sergei Aydarov (from Spartak Moscow academy)
57	MF	RUS	Danil Sviridov (from own academy)
62	DF	RUS	Artyom Yesaulenko
72	MF	RUS	Sergei Ponedelnik
74	MF	RUS	Norik Mkrtchyan (from own academy)
79	GK	RUS	Danila Yermakov (from Krylia Sovetov Samara)
81	MF	RUS	Andrei Napolov (from own academy)
83	MF	RUS	Roman Petrov (from own academy)
94	MF	RUS	Igor Cherkasov (from own academy)

Out: Note: Flags indicate national team as defined under FIFA eligibility rules; some limited exceptions apply. Players may hold more than one non-FIFA nationality.

No.	Pos.	Nation	Player
1	GK	KAZ	Stas Pokatilov (on loan to (Kazakhstan) Kairat)
9	MF	GAB	Guélor Kanga (to (Serbia) Red Star Belgrade)
12	GK	RUS	Nikita Chagrov (to Chayka Peschanokopskoye)
15	DF	ANG	Bastos (to (Italy) Lazio)
18	MF	RUS	Pavel Mogilevets (end of loan from Zenit St. Petersburg)
21	FW	RUS	Said-Ali Akhmayev (to Chernomorets Novorossiysk)
23	MF	RUS	Aleksandr Troshechkin (on loan to Fakel Voronezh)
25	DF	RUS	Ivan Novoseltsev (to Zenit St. Petersburg)
28	DF	FIN	Boris Rotenberg (end of loan from Dynamo Moscow)
32	FW	GEO	Nika Kacharava (on loan to (Cyprus) Ethnikos Achna)
34	DF	RUS	Timofei Margasov (to Krylia Sovetov Samara)
46	FW	RUS	Danila Lyuft (to Dynamo Stavropol)
48	MF	RUS	Artyom Maksimenko (to Spartak Dzhankoy)
51	GK	RUS	Ivan Zozin
58	MF	RUS	Maksim Kondrashyov
59	DF	RUS	Ivan Reutenko (to Sulin Krasny Sulin)
62	GK	RUS	Vladislav Suslov (to Arsenal-2 Tula)
63	DF	RUS	Aleksandr Logunov (to Avangard Kursk)
66	MF	RUS	Daniil Ostapenko (to Zenit Penza)
68	MF	RUS	Vasili Lipin (to Sulin Krasny Sulin)
73	DF	RUS	Aleksei Grechkin (to Armavir)
74	MF	RUS	Yevgeni Stukanov (to Rotor Volgograd)
86	FW	KOR	Yoo Byung-soo
94	GK	RUS	Roman Pshukov
96	DF	RUS	Nikita Bocharov
99	FW	MNE	Nemanja Nikolić (to (Kazakhstan) Aktobe)
—	DF	RUS	Ruslan Abazov (to Tosno, previously on loan to Tyumen)
—	DF	RUS	Temur Mustafin (to Zenit St. Petersburg, previously on loan to Avangard Kursk)
—	MF	RUS	Artyom Kulishev (to Dynamo St. Petersburg, previously on loan)

=== Rubin Kazan ===
In: Note: Flags indicate national team as defined under FIFA eligibility rules; some limited exceptions apply. Players may hold more than one non-FIFA nationality.

No.	Pos.	Nation	Player
4	MF	FRA	Yann M'Vila (end of loan to (England) Sunderland)
6	DF	ESP	Sergio Sánchez (from (Greece) Panathinaikos)
8	MF	CMR	Alex Song (from (Spain) Barcelona)
10	MF	BEL	Maxime Lestienne (from (Qatar) Al-Arabi)
21	MF	ESP	Rubén Rochina (from (Spain) Granada)
22	FW	BRA	Jonathas (from (Spain) Real Sociedad)
23	DF	SUI	Moritz Bauer (from (Switzerland) Grasshoppers)
25	DF	PER	Carlos Zambrano (from (Germany) Eintracht Frankfurt)
33	MF	RUS	Inal Getigezhev (end of loan to Orenburg)
37	MF	RUS	Adil Mukhametzyanov
51	MF	RUS	Nikita Kulalayev (from Lada-Togliatti)
53	FW	RUS	Nikita Goldobin
54	FW	RUS	Daniil Makeyev (from Khimki-M)
64	DF	COD	Chris Mavinga (end of loan to (France) ESTAC)
70	MF	RUS	Georgi Makhatadze (from Lokomotiv Moscow)
77	MF	ESP	Samu (from (Spain) Villarreal)
80	MF	RUS	Vladislav Kulik (end of loan to Kuban Krasnodar)
90	DF	RUS	Taras Burlak (end of loan to Krylia Sovetov Samara)
96	FW	RUS	Rifat Zhemaletdinov (from Lokomotiv Moscow)

Out: Note: Flags indicate national team as defined under FIFA eligibility rules; some limited exceptions apply. Players may hold more than one non-FIFA nationality.

No.	Pos.	Nation	Player
7	FW	RUS	Igor Portnyagin (to Lokomotiv Moscow)
8	DF	RUS	Maksim Batov (on loan to Orenburg)
10	MF	BRA	Carlos Eduardo (to (Brazil) Atlético Mineiro)
15	MF	BLR	Syarhey Kislyak (to (Turkey) Gaziantepspor)
21	DF	URU	Guillermo Cotugno (on loan to (Argentina) Talleres)
29	MF	RUS	Shota Bibilov (to Olimpiyets Nizhny Novgorod)
30	MF	RUS	Vladimir Sobolev (on loan to Neftekhimik Nizhnekamsk)
34	FW	RUS	Timur Khakimov
37	MF	RUS	Aleksei Frolov
39	DF	RUS	Niyaz Valeyev
42	DF	RUS	Amir Gavrilov
43	FW	RUS	Nikita Vorona
46	MF	RUS	Ruslan Kausarov (to Kuban-2 Krasnodar)
52	MF	RUS	Rail Idiyatullin
54	MF	RUS	Erik Vasilyev
58	DF	RUS	Nikita Balandin
64	FW	RUS	Nikita Tankov (to CRFSO Smolensk)
65	DF	RUS	Maksim Zhestokov (to Volgar Astrakhan)
66	DF	RUS	Almaz Gilmutdinov
70	GK	RUS	Yevgeni Shchetinin (to Dynamo Kirov)
77	MF	BUL	Blagoy Georgiev (to Orenburg)
79	DF	UKR	Andriy Pylyavskyi (on loan to (Ukraine) Vorskla Poltava)
86	FW	RUS	Timur Koblov
95	GK	RUS	Fyodor Arsentyev (on loan to Neftekhimik Nizhnekamsk, previously from Spartak Moscow)
95	MF	RUS	Insar Salakhetdinov (to Sportakademklub Moscow)
96	MF	RUS	German Frolov
—	DF	GEO	Mamuka Kobakhidze (on loan to Neftekhimik Nizhnekamsk, previously on loan to Mordovia Saransk)
—	DF	URU	Mauricio Lemos (to (Spain) Las Palmas, previously on loan)
—	MF	GHA	Wakaso Mubarak (to (Greece) Panathinaikos, previously on loan to (Spain) Las Palmas)
—	MF	RUS	Ilsur Samigullin (to Syzran-2003, previously on loan to Neftekhimik Nizhnekamsk)
—	MF	RUS	Albert Sharipov (on loan to Neftekhimik Nizhnekamsk, previously on loan to Tom Tomsk)
—	FW	IRN	Sardar Azmoun (to Rostov, previously on loan)
—	FW	RUS	Sergei Davydov (released, previously on loan to KAMAZ Naberezhnye Chelny)
—	FW	CRO	Marko Livaja (to (Spain) Las Palmas, previously on loan to (Italy) Empoli)
—	FW	RUS	Kamil Mullin (on loan to Neftekhimik Nizhnekamsk, previously on loan to Sokol Saratov)
—	FW	RUS	Dmitri Otstavnov (to (Portugal) Santa Clara, previously on loan to Volga Ulyanovsk)

=== Spartak Moscow ===
In: Note: Flags indicate national team as defined under FIFA eligibility rules; some limited exceptions apply. Players may hold more than one non-FIFA nationality.

No.	Pos.	Nation	Player
11	MF	BRA	Fernando (from (Italy) Sampdoria)
28	MF	RUS	Yegor Rudkovskiy (from Chertanovo Moscow)
33	DF	BRA	Maurício (on loan from (Italy) Lazio)
35	DF	GER	Serdar Tasci (end of loan to (Germany) Bayern Munich)
38	DF	RUS	Andrey Yeshchenko (from Anzhi Makhachkala)
41	GK	RUS	Sergei Lazarev (from Tosno-M)
47	MF	RUS	Roman Zobnin (from Dynamo Moscow)
69	FW	RUS	Denis Davydov (end of loan to (Czech Republic) Mladá Boleslav)
70	FW	RUS	Yegor Nikulin (from (Portugal) União de Leiria)
75	MF	RUS	Mikhail Ignatov
81	FW	RUS	Daniil Lopatin

Out: Note: Flags indicate national team as defined under FIFA eligibility rules; some limited exceptions apply. Players may hold more than one non-FIFA nationality.

No.	Pos.	Nation	Player
3	DF	RUS	Sergei Bryzgalov (to Terek Grozny)
4	DF	RUS	Sergei Parshivlyuk (to Anzhi Makhachkala)
7	MF	RUS	Kirill Kombarov (to Tom Tomsk)
13	DF	RUS	Vladimir Granat (to Rostov)
22	MF	RUS	Dmitri Kudryashov
26	DF	RUS	Anton Khodyrev (to Sokol Saratov)
27	MF	RUS	Aleksandr Zotov (to Dynamo Moscow)
31	GK	RUS	Fyodor Arsentyev (to Rubin Kazan)
41	FW	RUS	Vladimir Obukhov (to Kuban Krasnodar)
44	DF	RUS	Aydar Lisinkov (to Vityaz Podolsk)
51	MF	RUS	Dmitri Kayumov (to Tambov)
55	DF	RUS	Nikolai Fadeyev (to Khimki)
66	MF	RUS	Maksim Yermakov (to (Lithuania) Stumbras)
70	FW	RUS	Aleksandr Kozlov (to Tosno)
75	FW	RUS	Maximiliano Artemio Lyalyushkin
81	GK	RUS	Yuri Shcherbakov
91	MF	RUS	Pavel Yakovlev (to Anzhi Makhachkala, previously on loan to Krylia Sovetov Samara)
—	MF	ARG	Tino Costa (to (Argentina) San Lorenzo, previously on loan to (Italy) Fiorentina)

=== Terek Grozny ===
In: Note: Flags indicate national team as defined under FIFA eligibility rules; some limited exceptions apply. Players may hold more than one non-FIFA nationality.

No.	Pos.	Nation	Player
3	DF	RUS	Sergei Bryzgalov (from Spartak Moscow)
4	DF	VEN	Wilker Ángel (from (Venezuela) Deportivo Táchira)
18	FW	ALB	Bekim Balaj (from (Croatia) Rijeka)
20	MF	ROU	Gabriel Torje (from (Italy) Udinese)
21	MF	ALB	Odise Roshi (from (Croatia) Rijeka)
24	MF	RUS	Magomed-Emi Dzhabrailov
38	FW	RUS	Magomed Abdureshedov
87	MF	RUS	Shamsudin Masayev
97	GK	RUS	Khamzat Nasurov

Out: Note: Flags indicate national team as defined under FIFA eligibility rules; some limited exceptions apply. Players may hold more than one non-FIFA nationality.

No.	Pos.	Nation	Player
4	DF	FIN	Juhani Ojala (to (Finland) SJK)
14	MF	MAR	Ismaïl Aissati (to (Turkey) Alanyaspor)
20	MF	BRA	Kanu (to (Thailand) Buriram United)
24	DF	POL	Marcin Komorowski
27	GK	RUS	Ramzan Asayev
29	DF	AUS	Luke Wilkshire (to Dynamo Moscow)
31	MF	POL	Maciej Rybus (to (France) Lyon)
36	DF	RUS	Magomed Adayev (to Angusht Nazran)
37	GK	RUS	Turpal-Ali Debirov
41	FW	RUS	Khalim Yunusov
43	MF	RUS	Ismail Matayev
44	DF	RUS	Dzhabrail Kadiyev (to (Belarus) Belshina Bobruisk)
47	MF	RUS	Yunus Shaipov
60	MF	RUS	Akhyad Garisultanov
61	MF	RUS	Magomed Borshayev
65	FW	RUS	Zaur Osmayev (to Angusht Nazran)
69	DF	RUS	Zalimkhan Maysultanov
72	MF	RUS	Saykha Abdurashidov
73	MF	RUS	Ruslani Mutoshvili
74	MF	RUS	Arbi Davlitgereyev
77	FW	RUS	Ali Kadyrov
78	MF	RUS	Aslan Yanarsayev (to Pallasovka)
80	MF	RUS	Muslim Askhabov
81	GK	RUS	Magomed Mayrbekov
83	DF	RUS	Alibeg Gerayev
85	MF	RUS	Sharapudin Shalbuzov (to Druzhba Maykop)
87	DF	RUS	Islam Akayev
89	MF	RUS	Yevgeni Degtyaryov (to Saturn Ramenskoye)
93	FW	RUS	Apti Akhyadov (on loan to Spartak Nalchik)
96	DF	RUS	Akhmed Abubakarov
97	GK	RUS	Rasul Umayev
99	FW	RUS	Movsar Askhabov
—	MF	RUS	Adlan Katsayev (to SKA-Khabarovsk, previously on loan)

=== Tom Tomsk ===
In: Note: Flags indicate national team as defined under FIFA eligibility rules; some limited exceptions apply. Players may hold more than one non-FIFA nationality.

No.	Pos.	Nation	Player
2	DF	RUS	Aleksandr Zhirov (from Anzhi Makhachkala)
3	DF	RUS	Vitali Dyakov (on loan from Dynamo Moscow)
4	DF	CRO	Ante Puljić (from (Belgium) Gent)
5	MF	ROU	Eric Bicfalvi (from (Romania) Dinamo București)
6	MF	CZE	Lukáš Droppa (from (Romania) Pandurii Târgu Jiu)
8	MF	UKR	Kyrylo Kovalchuk (from (Turkey) Karşıyaka)
9	DF	RUS	Kirill Kombarov (from Spartak Moscow)
11	FW	UKR	Oleksandr Kasyan (from Fakel Voronezh)
14	DF	RUS	Aslan Dudiyev (from Mordovia Saransk)
18	MF	RUS	Artyom Popov (from Zenit St. Petersburg)
19	DF	RUS	Pyotr Ten (from CSKA Moscow, previously on loan)
20	DF	CZE	David Jablonský (from (Czech Republic) Teplice)
22	FW	RUS	Sergey Samodin (from Mordovia Saransk)
23	DF	BIH	Ognjen Vranješ (from (Spain) Sporting de Gijón)
39	FW	RUS	Maksim Rykov
41	MF	RUS	Andrei Zorin (from Baikal Irkutsk)
42	GK	RUS	Aleksandr Melikhov
45	MF	RUS	Andrei Ogaryov
48	DF	RUS	Maksim Tishkin (from Mordovia Saransk)
49	DF	RUS	Dmitri Bablyuk
60	GK	RUS	Konstantin Olifirenko (from Tom-2 Tomsk)
63	GK	RUS	Nikita Zubchikhin
65	MF	RUS	Ruslan Salakhutdinov (from Tom-2 Tomsk)
69	DF	RUS	Mark Karymov
70	MF	RUS	Maksim Antukh
71	DF	RUS	Yegor Chernyshov
77	GK	RUS	Anton Kochenkov (on loan from Lokomotiv Moscow)
78	FW	RUS	Pavel Kudryashov (from Tom-2 Tomsk)
80	MF	RUS	Renat Fayzulin
84	DF	RUS	Anton Miterev (from Tom-2 Tomsk)
87	FW	RUS	Dmitri Sasin (from Tom-2 Tomsk)
88	MF	RUS	Daniil Bolshunov (from Yakutiya Yakutsk)
89	DF	RUS	Dmitri Osipov (from Sibir-2 Novosibirsk)
91	MF	RUS	Daniil Kuzmin
94	MF	RUS	Aleksandr Naumenko
96	DF	RUS	Aleksandr Bukachyov (from Tom-2 Tomsk)
97	FW	RUS	Aleksandr Sobolev (from Dynamo Barnaul)
98	MF	RUS	Nikita Gvineysky

Out: Note: Flags indicate national team as defined under FIFA eligibility rules; some limited exceptions apply. Players may hold more than one non-FIFA nationality.

No.	Pos.	Nation	Player
3	DF	RUS	Daniil Chalov (to Mordovia Saransk)
4	MF	RUS	Yevgeni Bashkirov (to Krylia Sovetov Samara)
5	MF	RUS	Pyotr Nemov
7	DF	RUS	Ivan Temnikov (to Dynamo Moscow)
10	FW	RUS	Anzor Sanaya (to Orenburg)
12	DF	RUS	Mikhail Bashilov (to (Lithuania) Utenis Utena)
13	MF	BLR	Pavel Nyakhaychyk (to Orenburg)
14	MF	RUS	Aleksandr Cherevko (to SKA-Khabarovsk)
23	DF	RUS	Georgi Dzhioyev
24	MF	RUS	Andrei Lyakh
25	DF	CZE	Martin Jiránek (to (Czech Republic) Příbram)
26	DF	RUS	Sergei Bendz (to Kuban Krasnodar)
31	DF	RUS	Vitali Shakhov (end of loan from Fakel Voronezh)
32	FW	RUS	Nikita Bazhenov
55	GK	RUS	Aleksandr Krivoruchko (end of loan from Anzhi Makhachkala)
73	MF	RUS	Andrei Dyrdin
77	GK	UKR	Oleh Chuvayev (to (Ukraine) Zorya Luhansk)
93	MF	RUS	Albert Sharipov (end of loan from Rubin Kazan)
—	DF	RUS	Artyom Yarmolitsky (released, previously on loan to (Armenia) Mika)

=== Ufa ===
In: Note: Flags indicate national team as defined under FIFA eligibility rules; some limited exceptions apply. Players may hold more than one non-FIFA nationality.

No.	Pos.	Nation	Player
1	GK	RUS	Mikhail Borodko (from Yenisey Krasnoyarsk)
5	DF	RUS	Viktor Vasin (on loan from CSKA Moscow)
9	MF	CZE	Ondřej Vaněk (from (Czech Republic) Viktoria Plzeň)
17	DF	RUS	Dmitri Zhivoglyadov (from Dynamo Moscow)
21	FW	NGA	Kehinde Fatai (from (Czech Republic) Sparta Prague)
30	GK	UKR	Bohdan Sarnavskyi (from (Ukraine) Shakhtar Donetsk)
55	GK	RUS	Daniil Lyasov
67	FW	RUS	Artyom Shitov
72	MF	RUS	Valentin Videneyev (from Konoplyov football academy)
75	DF	RUS	Artyom Nadeyev
77	MF	RUS	Andrei Batyutin (from Krasnodar)
81	DF	RUS	Anton Ladygin
86	MF	RUS	Daniel Gumerov
89	MF	RUS	Maksim Sidorov
91	MF	RUS	Andrey Vlasov
95	DF	RUS	Dmitri Tashbulatov (from Akademiya Ufa)
96	MF	RUS	Renat Yusupov (from CSKA Moscow)
98	MF	RUS	Ivan Oblyakov (from Zenit St. Petersburg academy)
99	FW	RUS	Islamnur Abdulavov (from Anzhi Makhachkala)

Out: Note: Flags indicate national team as defined under FIFA eligibility rules; some limited exceptions apply. Players may hold more than one non-FIFA nationality.

No.	Pos.	Nation	Player
6	FW	GER	Marvin Pourié (end of loan from (Denmark) Copenhagen)
7	DF	RUS	Yevgeni Osipov (to Mordovia Saransk)
9	FW	BIH	Haris Handžić (to (Croatia) Rijeka)
17	MF	UKR	Oleksandr Zinchenko (to (England) Manchester City)
19	MF	CRO	Ivan Paurević (to (England) Huddersfield Town)
34	DF	RUS	Aleksandr Katsalapov (to Orenburg)
42	GK	RUS	Sergei Narubin (to Dynamo Moscow)
55	MF	RUS	Artur Sitdikov
75	DF	RUS	Ilya Ponomaryov
79	MF	RUS	Al-Khan Samba
—	GK	RUS	David Yurchenko (to Anzhi Makhachkala, previously on loan)
—	MF	RUS	Nikita Bezlikhotnov (to Sibir Novosibirsk, previously on loan to SKA-Energiya Khabarovsk)
—	MF	RUS	Anton Kilin (to Luch-Energiya Vladivostok, previously on loan to KAMAZ Naberezhnye Chelny)
—	MF	RUS	Maksim Semakin (on loan to Yenisey Krasnoyarsk, previously on loan to Luch-Energiya Vladivostok)
—	MF	RUS	Aleksandr Vasilyev (on loan to Neftekhimik Nizhnekamsk, previously on loan to Torpedo Armavir)

=== Ural Sverdlovsk Oblast ===
In: Note: Flags indicate national team as defined under FIFA eligibility rules; some limited exceptions apply. Players may hold more than one non-FIFA nationality.

No.	Pos.	Nation	Player
8	MF	RUS	Aleksandr Pavlenko (from Shinnik Yaroslavl)
9	FW	RUS	Roman Pavlyuchenko (from Kuban Krasnodar)
13	DF	SRB	Radovan Pankov (from (Serbia) Vojvodina)
14	FW	CIV	Jean-Jacques Bougouhi (from Armavir)
21	DF	RUS	Dmitri Borovkov (from Kvant Obninsk)
25	MF	KAZ	Georgy Zhukov (from (Belgium) Standard Liège)
33	MF	RUS	Vartan Karkaryan
39	FW	GEO	Giorgi Chanturia (from (Germany) MSV Duisburg)
43	MF	RUS	Aleksandr Golubtsov
46	DF	RUS	Vyacheslav Berdnikov
60	GK	RUS	Vladislav Poletayev
65	MF	RUS	Dmitri Khlyoskin
72	DF	RUS	Osman Suleymanov
82	DF	RUS	Volodya Israelyan
86	FW	CIV	Mohamed Konaté (from (Moldova) Saxan)
88	MF	RUS	Aleksandr Bunakov
93	FW	RUS	Lev Popov

Out: Note: Flags indicate national team as defined under FIFA eligibility rules; some limited exceptions apply. Players may hold more than one non-FIFA nationality.

No.	Pos.	Nation	Player
4	DF	BLR	Alyaksandr Martynovich (end of loan from Krasnodar)
8	MF	UKR	Kostyantyn Yaroshenko (to (Ukraine) Karpaty Lviv)
9	FW	RUS	Spartak Gogniyev (to Kuban Krasnodar)
17	DF	RUS	Artemi Dorozhinsky
10	FW	ARM	Edgar Manucharyan
18	FW	RUS	Nikita Burmistrov (end of loan from Krasnodar)
20	DF	RUS	Roman Mironov
21	MF	CHI	Gerson Acevedo (to (Kazakhstan) Kairat)
30	GK	BLR	Yuri Zhevnov
34	FW	RUS	Denis Dorozhkin (to Tambov)
37	MF	RUS	Yevgeni Shumikhin
41	MF	RUS	Aleksandr Sapeta (to Dynamo Moscow)
47	DF	RUS	Artyom Vakurin
54	MF	RUS	Aleksandr Ryazantsev (end of loan from Zenit St. Petersburg)
61	DF	RUS	Pavel Parshin
64	MF	RUS	Vladislav Zolotukhin (to Rotor Volgograd)
70	MF	RUS	Dmitri Davletshin
71	FW	AZE	Elbeyi Guliyev
76	MF	RUS	Mikhail Filippov
77	MF	UKR	Dmytro Bilonoh (on loan to (Ukraine) Zirka Kropyvnytskyi)
80	DF	RUS	Yegor Zlygostev
83	DF	RUS	Aleksei Gerasimov (on loan to (Belarus) Belshina Bobruisk, previously on loan to Volga-Olimpiyets Nizhny Novgorod)
84	DF	RUS	Yevgeni Ivanov
91	FW	RUS	Nikita Durandin
95	FW	RUS	Aleksandr Babushkin
—	DF	RUS	Denis Fomin (on loan to Tekstilshchik Ivanovo, previously on loan to Tambov)
—	MF	RUS	Ivan Chudin (to Tyumen, previously on loan)

=== Zenit Saint Petersburg ===
In: Note: Flags indicate national team as defined under FIFA eligibility rules; some limited exceptions apply. Players may hold more than one non-FIFA nationality.

No.	Pos.	Nation	Player
3	DF	RUS	Ivan Novoseltsev (from Rostov)
5	MF	RUS	Aleksandr Ryazantsev (end of loan to Ural Sverdlovsk Oblast)
7	MF	BRA	Giuliano (from (Brazil) Grêmio)
11	FW	RUS	Aleksandr Kerzhakov (end of loan to (Switzerland) Zürich)
15	MF	RUS	Pavel Mogilevets (end of loan to Rostov)
29	MF	SVK	Róbert Mak (from (Greece) PAOK)
34	FW	RUS	Maximilian Pronichev (end of loan to (Germany) Schalke 04 U19)
43	MF	RUS	Nikita Koldunov
48	FW	RUS	Aleksei Gasilin (end of loan to (Germany) Schalke 04 II)
54	DF	RUS	Nikita Kakkoyev
62	MF	RUS	Maksim Levin
66	DF	RUS	Samir Bayramov
68	MF	RUS	Yefim Boytsov
70	GK	RUS	Nikita Goylo
75	DF	RUS	Temur Mustafin (from Rostov)
76	MF	RUS	Kirill Makeyev
77	FW	MNE	Luka Đorđević (end of loan to (Spain) Ponferradina)
78	FW	RUS	Aleksandr Nekrasov
79	DF	RUS	Daniil Penchikov
86	GK	RUS	Nikolai Rybikov
89	GK	RUS	Amir Fattakhov
90	FW	RUS	Yefrem Vartanyan
97	MF	RUS	Ilya Kamyshev (from Chertanovo Moscow)
—	MF	RUS	Aleksei Isayev (from Yenisey Krasnoyarsk)

Out: Note: Flags indicate national team as defined under FIFA eligibility rules; some limited exceptions apply. Players may hold more than one non-FIFA nationality.

No.	Pos.	Nation	Player
7	FW	BRA	Hulk (to (China) Shanghai SIPG)
16	GK	RUS	Vyacheslav Malafeev (retired)
24	DF	ARG	Ezequiel Garay (to (Spain) Valencia)
32	DF	RUS	Artyom Sumin
37	FW	RUS	Artyom Ponikarov (to UOR #5 Yegoryevsk)
43	FW	RUS	Pavel Nazimov
45	DF	RUS	Artyom Vodyannikov
47	MF	RUS	Valeri Yaroshenko (to Rostov)
51	GK	RUS	Maksim Rudakov (to Zenit Penza)
52	DF	RUS	Andrei Ivanov (on loan to Mordovia Saransk)
54	MF	RUS	Daniil Zuyev
57	DF	RUS	Nikolai Tarasov
60	MF	RUS	Maksim Paliyenko (end of loan from Krylia Sovetov Samara)
62	DF	RUS	Stepan Rebenko (to Arsenal Tula)
66	FW	RUS	Vadim Romanov
67	MF	RUS	Nikita Andreyev (on loan to (Slovakia) VSS Košice)
68	MF	RUS	Vyacheslav Zinkov (to Krylia Sovetov Samara)
70	FW	RUS	Dmitri Bogayev (to (Lithuania) Palanga)
73	MF	RUS	Pavel Osipov (on loan to (Finland) Lahti)
74	MF	RUS	Sergei Ivanov (on loan to (Slovakia) VSS Košice)
75	DF	RUS	Andrei Vasilyev
76	FW	RUS	Pavel Kireyenko (to (Lithuania) Palanga)
80	GK	RUS	Mikhail Mzhelsky
83	GK	RUS	Igor Obukhov (to Zenit-2 St. Petersburg)
88	MF	RUS	Artyom Popov (to Tom Tomsk)
90	FW	AZE	Ramil Sheydayev (to (Turkey) Trabzonspor)
95	GK	RUS	Aleksandr Vasyutin (on loan to (Finland) Lahti)
96	MF	RUS	Ilya Kubyshkin (to (Czech Republic) Slovan Liberec)
97	FW	RUS	Ruslan Suanov
98	FW	RUS	Yevgeni Reutov
—	DF	ARG	Cristian Ansaldi (to (Italy) Genoa, previously on loan)
—	DF	RUS	Dmitri Chistyakov (to Shinnik Yaroslavl, previously on loan to (Armenia) Mika)
—	MF	RUS	Ivan Solovyov (to Fakel Voronezh, previously on loan to (Finland) Lahti)
