= 2016–17 FC Krylia Sovetov Samara season =

FC Krylia Sovetov Samara
2016–17 season
- Chairman: Vitaliy Shashkov
- Manager: Franky Vercauteren (until 31 October); Hans Visser (caretaker) (1-3 November 2016); Vadim Skripchenko (from 3 November 2016)
- Stadium: Metallurg Stadion
- Russian Premier League: 15th
- Russian Cup: Round of 16 vs Lokomotiv Moscow
- Top goalscorer: League: Sergei Kornilenko (8); All: Sergei Kornilenko (9)
Home colours	Away colours

The 2016–17 FC Krylia Sovetov Samara season is the club's second season back in the Russian Premier League, the highest tier of football in Russia, since their relegation at the end of the 2013–14 season, and 22nd in total.

== Season events ==
On 1 November 2016, with the club in last position in the Russian Premier League table, manager Franky Vercauteren left Krylia Sovetov by mutual consent, with Hans Visser taking over in a caretaker capacity.

== Squad ==
As of 24 February 2017

Note: Flags indicate national team as defined under FIFA eligibility rules; some limited exceptions apply. Players may hold more than one non-FIFA nationality.

No.	Pos.	Nation	Player
2	MF	RUS	Yevgeni Bashkirov
3	DF	RUS	Dmitri Yatchenko
4	DF	RUS	Ivan Taranov
5	DF	RUS	Ali Gadzhibekov
6	DF	BRA	Nadson
7	MF	RUS	Alan Chochiyev
8	FW	BLR	Sergei Kornilenko
9	FW	FIN	Berat Sadik
10	FW	ITA	Cristian Pasquato (on loan from Juventus)
11	MF	BLR	Alexander Hleb
13	GK	RUS	Yevgeni Konyukhov
16	MF	UKR	Artem Hromov
17	GK	GEO	Giorgi Loria
19	DF	TTO	Sheldon Bateau
20	MF	SRB	Srđan Mijailović

No.	Pos.	Nation	Player
21	MF	RUS	Vyacheslav Zinkov
22	DF	RUS	Sandro Tsveiba
27	MF	RUS	Aleksandr Zuyev (on loan from Spartak Moscow)
28	FW	RUS	Pavel Kudryashov
29	FW	BEL	Gianni Bruno
31	DF	RUS	Georgi Zotov
33	DF	SRB	Milan Rodić
40	DF	RUS	Sergei Bozhin
56	FW	RUS	Ilya Buryukin
48	MF	RUS	Artyom Yezhov
49	MF	RUS	Konstantin Shamayev
69	FW	RUS	Yegor Golenkov
77	MF	RUS	Sergei Tkachyov (on loan from CSKA Moscow)
98	FW	RUS	Ilya Viznovich

=== Youth squad ===
Note: Flags indicate national team as defined under FIFA eligibility rules; some limited exceptions apply. Players may hold more than one non-FIFA nationality.

No.	Pos.	Nation	Player
47	FW	RUS	Vladimir Rasskazchikov
49	MF	RUS	Nikita Kireyev
53	DF	RUS	Ivan Stolyarov
54	GK	RUS	Vladimir Teryokhin
61	MF	RUS	Nikolai Kiritsa
67	MF	RUS	David Zakharyan
70	MF	RUS	Emrakh Nabatov
76	DF	RUS	Denis Lozovik
78	MF	RUS	Gennadi Kiselyov
79	DF	RUS	Ilya Yermolayev

No.	Pos.	Nation	Player
80	MF	RUS	Leonid Afinogentov
81	GK	RUS	Bogdan Ovsyannikov
87	DF	RUS	Andrei Krasnov
88	GK	RUS	Vitali Shilnikov
89	DF	RUS	Vladislav Masalsky
92	MF	RUS	Aleksandr Dmitryuk
94	MF	RUS	Viktor Gryazin
97	DF	RUS	Maksim Vasilyev
99	FW	RUS	Yevgeni Slanko
—	MF	RUS	Serob Grigoryan

== Transfers ==
=== Summer ===
In: Note: Flags indicate national team as defined under FIFA eligibility rules; some limited exceptions apply. Players may hold more than one non-FIFA nationality.

No.	Pos.	Nation	Player
1	GK	RUS	Maksim Pavlov (from (Russia) KAMAZ Naberezhnye Chelny)
2	MF	RUS	Yevgeni Bashkirov (from (Russia) Tom Tomsk)
10	FW	ITA	Cristian Pasquato (on loan from (Italy) Juventus)
14	MF	FRA	Yohan Mollo (from (France) Saint-Étienne, previously on loan)
19	DF	TTO	Sheldon Bateau (from (Belgium) Mechelen, previously on loan)
21	MF	RUS	Vyacheslav Zinkov (from (Russia) Zenit Saint Petersburg)
23	FW	NGR	Jerry Mbakogu (on loan from (Italy) Carpi)
34	DF	RUS	Timofei Margasov (from (Russia) Rostov)
47	FW	RUS	Vladimir Rasskazchikov
49	MF	RUS	Nikita Kireyev (from (Russia) Dynamo Moscow)
53	DF	RUS	Ivan Stolyarov (from own academy)
54	GK	RUS	Vladimir Teryokhin
70	MF	RUS	Emrakh Nabatov
76	DF	RUS	Denis Lozovik
77	MF	RUS	Sergei Tkachyov (on loan from (Russia) CSKA Moscow)
78	MF	RUS	Gennadi Kiselyov (from (Russia) Lada-Togliatti)
79	DF	RUS	Ilya Yermolayev
81	GK	RUS	Bogdan Ovsyannikov
92	MF	RUS	Aleksandr Dmitryuk
94	MF	RUS	Viktor Gryazin
97	DF	RUS	Maksim Vasilyev
99	FW	RUS	Yevgeni Slanko

Out: Note: Flags indicate national team as defined under FIFA eligibility rules; some limited exceptions apply. Players may hold more than one non-FIFA nationality.

No.	Pos.	Nation	Player
1	GK	RUS	Miroslav Lobantsev (end of loan from (Russia) Lokomotiv Moscow)
5	MF	RUS	Georgy Gabulov (to (Russia) Orenburg)
16	MF	BEL	Jeroen Simaeys (to (Belgium) OHL)
18	FW	MKD	Adis Jahović (to (Turkey) Göztepe)
20	MF	RUS	Aleksei Pomerko (to (Russia) Orenburg)
27	FW	CIV	Junior Ahissan (to (Ukraine) Dynamo Kyiv)
43	MF	RUS	Oleg Roganov (to (Moldova) Dacia Chișinău)
44	DF	RUS	Semyon Biryukov
55	MF	RUS	Andrei Kalinin
66	MF	RUS	Saveliy Kozlov
70	MF	RUS	Danila Popov
71	GK	RUS	Danila Yermakov (to (Russia) Rostov)
90	DF	RUS	Taras Burlak (end of loan from (Russia) Rubin Kazan)
91	MF	RUS	Pavel Yakovlev (end of loan from (Russia) Spartak Moscow)
93	DF	RUS	Vitali Kalenkovich (to (Russia) Baltika Kaliningrad)
96	DF	RUS	Kirill Mironov
97	MF	RUS	Daniil Melikhov (to (Latvia) Daugavpils)
99	DF	RUS	Aleksei Makushkin
—	DF	RUS	Anton Bocharov (to (Russia) Nosta Novotroitsk, previously on loan)
—	DF	RUS	Sergei Obivalin (to (Russia) Sportakademklub Moscow, previously on loan to (Russia) Lada-Togliatti)
—	MF	RUS	Igor Gorbatenko (to (Russia) Arsenal Tula, previously on loan)
—	MF	AZE	Emin Makhmudov (to (Portugal) Boavista, previously on loan to (Russia) Mordovia Saransk)
—	MF	RUS	Maksim Paliyenko (to (Russia) Tosno, previously on loan to (Russia) Zenit St. Petersburg)

=== Winter ===
In: Note: Flags indicate national team as defined under FIFA eligibility rules; some limited exceptions apply. Players may hold more than one non-FIFA nationality.

No.	Pos.	Nation	Player
5	DF	RUS	Ali Gadzhibekov (from (Russia) Anzhi Makhachkala)
11	MF	BLR	Alexander Hleb (from (Belarus) BATE Borisov)
16	MF	UKR	Artem Hromov (from (Ukraine) Dynamo Kyiv)
20	MF	SRB	Srđan Mijailović (from (Turkey) Kayserispor)
22	DF	RUS	Sandro Tsveiba (from (Kazakhstan) Aktobe)
27	MF	RUS	Aleksandr Zuyev (on loan from (Russia) Spartak Moscow)
28	FW	RUS	Pavel Kudryashov (from (Russia) Tom Tomsk)
31	DF	RUS	Georgi Zotov (from (Russia) Kuban Krasnodar)
51	GK	RUS	Yegor Lyubakov
55	MF	RUS	Aleksandr Bogomolov
56	FW	RUS	Ilya Buryukin (from (Russia) Lada Togliatti)
57	DF	RUS	Andrei Dubrovin
58	MF	RUS	Artyom Yezhov (from (Russia) Lada Togliatti)
59	MF	RUS	Konstantin Shamayev (from (Russia) Lada Togliatti)

Out: Note: Flags indicate national team as defined under FIFA eligibility rules; some limited exceptions apply. Players may hold more than one non-FIFA nationality.

No.	Pos.	Nation	Player
1	GK	RUS	Maksim Pavlov
14	MF	FRA	Yohan Mollo (to (Russia) Zenit St. Petersburg)
15	DF	RUS	Ibragim Tsallagov (to (Russia) Zenit St. Petersburg)
23	FW	NGR	Jerry Mbakogu (end of loan from (Italy) Carpi)
34	DF	RUS	Timofei Margasov (to (Russia) Lokomotiv Moscow)
45	DF	RUS	Aleksei Kontsedalov (to (Russia) Baltika Kaliningrad)
61	MF	RUS	Nikolai Kiritsa (on loan to (Russia) Zenit Penza)

== Competitions ==
=== Russian Premier League ===
==== Results by round ====
Round	1	2	3	4	5	6	7	8	9	10	11	12	13	14	15	16	17	18	19	20	21	22	23	24	25	26	27	28	29	30
Ground	A	A	H	A	H	A	H	A	H	A	H	A	H	A	H	H	A	H	A	H	A	H	A	H	A	H	A	H	A	H
Result	L	L	D	D	L	L	L	D	W	L	D	L	D	L	W	W	D	L	L	D	L	D	W	D	L	D	W	L	W	L
Position	12	15	14	14	16	16	16	16	16	16	16	16	16	16	14	13	12	14	15	14	15	14	13	14	15	14	14	14	13	15

Updated to match(es) played on 21 May 2017. Source: See Results
A = Away; H = Home; W = Win; D = Draw; L = Loss

==== Matches ====
31 July 2016 1	Terek Grozny	1 – 0	Krylia Sovetov	Grozny
21:30 SAMT (UTC+4)	Grozav (yellow card) 69' (goal) 75' (pen.)	Summary	Taranov (yellow card) 44'; Kornilenko (yellow card) 88'	Stadium: Akhmat-Arena; Attendance: 18,783; Referee: Aleksey Eskov

8 August 2016 2	Spartak Moscow	1 – 0	Krylia Sovetov	Moscow
20:30 SAMT (UTC+4)	Yeshchenko 70'; Fernando (yellow card) 71'	Summary		Stadium: Otkrytiye Arena; Attendance: 17,449; Referee: Mikhail Vilkov

13 August 2016 3	Krylia Sovetov	1 – 1	Krasnodar	Samara
19:00 SAMT (UTC+4)	Rodić 3' (yellow card) 75'; Taranov (yellow card) 34'	Summary	Smolov 52'	Stadium: Metallurg Stadium; Attendance: 9,012; Referee: Alexey Nikolaev

21 August 2016 4	Lokomotiv Moscow	0 – 0	Krylia Sovetov	Moscow
21:30 SAMT (UTC+4)	Shishkin (yellow card) 45+1'; N'Dinga (yellow card) 63'	Summary	Yatchenko (yellow card) 11'; Chochiyev (yellow card) 67'	Stadium: Lokomotiv Stadium; Attendance: 9,107; Referee: Kirill Levnikov

26 August 2016 5	Krylia Sovetov	0 – 1	Ufa	Samara
19:30 SAMT (UTC+4)	Chochiyev (yellow card) 66'	Summary	Stotsky (yellow card) 50'; Alikin (yellow card) 61' (yellow-red card) 87'; Zubarev (yellow card) 65'; Igboun 83' (pen.); Krotov (yellow card) 86'; Shelia (yellow card) 90+4'	Stadium: Metallurg Stadium; Attendance: 9,082; Referee: Alexander Yegorov

9 September 2016 6	Rostov	2 – 1	Krylya Sovetov	Rostov-on-Don
21:00 SAMT (UTC+4)	Terentyev (yellow card) 28'; Bukharov 33' (yellow card) 86'; Prepeliță 59'; Gueye (yellow card) 61'	Summary	Yerokhin 54' (o.g.); Kornilenko (yellow card) 87'; Taranov (yellow card) 90+2'; Yatchenko (yellow card) 90+4'	Stadium: Olimp-2; Attendance: 14,800; Referee: Sergey Karasev

18 September 2016 7	Krylia Sovetov	1 – 2	CSKA Moscow	Samara
18:15 SAMT (UTC+4)	Yatchenko 45'; Bateau (yellow card) 48'	Summary	Golovin 7'; Ignashevich 77'; Wernbloom (yellow card) 80'	Stadium: Metallurg Stadium; Attendance: 11,083; Referee: Bezborodov

26 September 2016 8	Amkar Perm	0 – 0	Krylia Sovetov	Perm
18:00 SAMT (UTC+4)	Dzhikiya (yellow card) 63'	Summary	Mbakogu (yellow card) 9'	Stadium: Zvezda Stadium; Attendance: 8,180; Referee: Aleksey Sukhoy

1 October 2016 9	Krylia Sovetov	2 – 1	Anzhi Makhachkala	Samara
15:30 SAMT (UTC+4)	Mollo 18'; Tkachyov 45+1' (yellow card) 76'	Summary	Musalov (yellow card) 25'; Parshivlyuk (yellow card) 43'; Gasanov (yellow card) 80'; Lazić (yellow card) 90'; Berisha 90+1' (yellow card) 90+2'	Stadium: Metallurg Stadium; Attendance: 5,263; Referee: Evgeny Turbin

15 October 2016 10	Rubin Kazan	3 – 0	Krylia Sovetov	Kazan
18:00 SAMT (UTC+4)	Kanunnikov 38'; Bauer (yellow card) 50'; Rochina 52'; Jonathas 53'	Summary	Tkachyov (yellow card) 43'; Taranov (yellow card) 80'; Kornilenko (yellow card) 82'	Stadium: Kazan Arena; Attendance: 9,176; Referee: Artem Chistyakov

21 October 2016 11	Krylia Sovetov	1 – 1	Arsenal Tula	Samara
19:00 SAMT (UTC+4)	Mollo 36' (pen.); Bashkirov (red card) 43'; Nadson (yellow card) 65'; Kornilenko (yellow card) 74'	Summary	Brown 44' (pen.); Vergara (yellow card) 66'	Stadium: Metallurg Stadium; Attendance: 4,678; Referee: Vitali Meshkov

31 October 2016 12	Orenburg	1 – 0	Krylia Sovetov	Orenburg
18:00 SAMT (UTC+4)	Delkin 62'; Andreyev (yellow card) 89'; Hutar (yellow card) 90+1'	Summary	Bozhin (yellow card) 33'; Chochiyev (yellow card) 45+1'	Stadium: Gazovik Stadium; Attendance: 3,750; Referee: Igor Fedotov

5 November 2016 13	Krylia Sovetov	2 – 2	Ural Yekaterinburg	Samara
17:00 SAMT (UTC+4)	Rodić (yellow card) 37'; Kornilenko 45+2', 65'; Bashkirov (yellow card) 74'	Summary	Dantsev (yellow card) 2'; Kulakov (yellow card) 9'; Korobov 22'; Pavlyuchenko (yellow card) 70'; Chanturia 73'; Fidler (yellow card) 90'	Stadium: Metallurg Stadium; Attendance: 3,447; Referee: Vladislav Bezborodov

20 November 2016 14	Zenit St.Petersburg	3 – 1	Krylia Sovetov	Saint Petersburg
20:30 SAMT (UTC+4)	Dzyuba 10', 89' (pen.); Rodić 36' (o.g.); Maurício (yellow card) 69'	Summary	Pasquato 4'; Nadson (yellow card) 22'; Taranov (yellow card) 52'; Margasov (yellow card) 63'	Stadium: Petrovsky Stadium; Attendance: 16,930; Referee: Aleksandr Egorov

27 November 2016 15	Krylia Sovetov	3 – 0	Tom Tomsk	Samara
15:00 SAMT (UTC+4)	Kornilenko 10'; Mollo 69', 78'; Bashkirov (yellow card) 73'	Summary	Kochenkov (red card) 26'; Balyaikin (yellow card) 37'	Stadium: Metallurg Stadium; Attendance: 2,036; Referee: Sergey Karasev

1 December 2016 16	Krylia Sovetov	4 – 0	Spartak Moscow	Samara
19:00 SAMT (UTC+4)	Mollo 17' (pen.); Tkachyov 45+2'; Pasquato 59'; Kornilenko 70'; Taranov (yellow card) 90+2'	Summary	Maurício (yellow card) 38'; Fernando (yellow card) 90'	Stadium: Metallurg Stadium; Attendance: 7,370; Referee: Kirill Levnikov

5 December 2016 17	Krasnodar	1 – 1	Krylia Sovetov	Krasnodar
20:00 SAMT (UTC+4)	Gazinsky (yellow card) 44'; Smolov 48'	Summary	Margasov (yellow card) 65'; Kornilenko 71'; Loria (yellow card) 86'; Yatchenko (yellow card) 90+4'	Stadium: Krasnodar Stadium; Attendance: 12,176; Referee: Evgeny Turbin

4 March 2017 18	Krylia Sovetov	0 – 3	Lokomotiv Moscow	Ufa
15:00 SAMT (UTC+4)		Summary	Ari 60', 68'; Miranchuk 88'	Stadium: Neftyanik Stadium; Attendance: 1,055; Referee: Sergey Ivanov

11 March 2017 19	Ufa	1 – 0	Krylia Sovetov	Ufa
12:30 SAMT (UTC+4)	Paurević 6'	Summary	Gadzhibekov (yellow card) 70'	Stadium: Neftyanik Stadium; Attendance: 6,200; Referee: Vladimir Seldyakov

19 March 2017 20	Krylia Sovetov	0 – 0	Rostov	Samara
15:00 SAMT (UTC+4)	Zinkov (yellow card) 56'	Summary	Noboa (yellow card) 8'; Yerokhin (yellow card) 21'; Kalachev (yellow card) 41'; Navas (yellow card) 60'	Stadium: Metallurg Stadium; Attendance: 6,572; Referee: Aleksandr Egorov

2 April 2017 21	CSKA Moscow	2 – 1	Krylia Sovetov	Moscow
20:00 SAMT (UTC+4)	Golovin 16'; Fernandes (yellow card) 19'; Natkho 48'	Summary	Pasquato 72'	Stadium: VEB Arena; Attendance: 14,000; Referee: Aleksey Sukhoy

8 April 2017 22	Krylia Sovetov	2 – 2	Amkar Perm	Samara
15:00 SAMT (UTC+4)	Bruno 16'; Kornilenko 32'; Zinkov (yellow card) 58' (yellow-red card) 90+1'	Summary	Gol 8'; Zaytsev (yellow card) 27'; Zanev 30' (pen.); Ogude (yellow card) 55'	Stadium: Metallurg Stadium; Attendance: 6,430; Referee: Vitaly Meshkov

15 April 2017 23	Anzhi Makhachkala	1 – 3	Krylia Sovetov	Kaspiysk
18:00 SAMT (UTC+4)	Parshivlyuk (yellow card) 15'; Khubulov 89' (pen.)	Summary	Kornilenko 9'; Zotov 23'; Pasquato 64'; Bozhin (yellow card) 88'	Stadium: Anzhi Arena; Attendance: 4,500; Referee: Alexey Nikolaev

23 April 2017 24	Krylia Sovetov	0 – 0	Rubin Kazan	Samara
15:30 SAMT (UTC+4)	Kornilenko (yellow card) 40'; Bruno (yellow card) 64'	Summary	Bauer (yellow card) 67'; Kambolov (yellow card) 90+4'	Stadium: Metallurg Stadium; Attendance: 7,513; Referee: Vladimir Moskalyov

26 April 2017 25	Arsenal Tula	2 – 0	Krylia Sovetov	Tula
20:30 SAMT (UTC+4)	Belyayev (yellow card) 14'; Grigalava 31'; Bourceanu (yellow card) 60'; Rasic 80'	Summary	Taranov (yellow card) 18'; Mijailović (yellow card) 44'; Zotov (yellow card) 59'	Stadium: Arsenal Stadium; Attendance: 11,730; Referee: Aleksandr Egorov

1 May 2017 26	Krylia Sovetov	1 – 1	Orenburg	Samara
16:30 SAMT (UTC+4)	Yatchenko 85' (pen.)	Summary	Georgiev 68'; Malykh (yellow card) 84'	Stadium: Metallurg Stadium; Attendance: 7,915; Referee: Sergey Karasev

8 May 2017 27	Ural Yekaterinburg	1 – 3	Krylia Sovetov	Yekaterinburg
15:30 SAMT (UTC+4)	Ilyin 2'	Summary	Tkachyov (yellow card) 27'; Kornilenko (yellow card) 37'; Bruno 54', 75'; Bozhin (yellow card) 64'; Pasquato 89'	Stadium: SKB-Bank Arena; Attendance: 4,100; Referee: Evgeny Turbin

13 May 2017 28	Krylia Sovetov	–	Zenit St.Petersburg	Samara
17:00 SAMT (UTC+4)	Bateau (yellow card) 39'; Ivanović 55' (o.g.); Bozhin (yellow card) 59'; Zotov (yellow card) 81'	Report	Dzyuba 1', 8'; García (yellow card) 35'	Stadium: Metallurg Stadium; Attendance: 18,753; Referee: Aleksandr Egorov

17 May 2017 29	Tom Tomsk	0 – 2	Krylia Sovetov	Tomsk
16:00 SAMT (UTC+4)	Balyaikin (yellow card) 27'; Popov (yellow card) 41'; Ciupercă (yellow card) 71'	Report	Bruno 5'; Zotov (yellow card) 35'; Kornilenko 80'	Stadium: Trud Stadium; Attendance: 2,250; Referee: Sergey Lapochkin

21 May 2017 30	Krylia Sovetov	1 – 3	Terek Grozny	Samara
16:00 SAMT (UTC+4)	Bruno (yellow card) 64' (goal) 90' (pen.); Tkachyov (yellow card) 69'	Report	Gyömbér (yellow card) 31'; Mbengue 37'; Mohammadi 56'; Pliyev (yellow card) 64'; Balaj (yellow card) 76'	Stadium: Metallurg Stadium; Attendance: 4,623; Referee: Alexey Nikolaev

==== League table ====
Pos	Team	Pld	W	D	L	GF	GA	GD	Pts	Qualification or relegation
12	Anzhi Makhachkala	30	7	9	14	24	38	−14	30 (Note: Anzhi Makhachkala ahead of Orenburg on head-to-head points; Orenburg–Anzhi Makhachkala 0–0, Anzhi Makhachkala–Orenburg 1–0.)	
13	Orenburg (R)	30	7	9	14	25	36	−11	30	Qualification for the Relegation play-offs
14	Arsenal Tula (O)	30	7	7	16	18	40	−22	28	Qualification for the Relegation play-offs
15	Krylia Sovetov Samara (R)	30	6	10	14	31	39	−8	28	Relegation to Football National League
16	Tom Tomsk (R)	30	3	5	22	17	64	−47	14	Relegation to Football National League

Source: Russian Premier League, Soccerway
Rules for classification: 1) Points; 2) Matches won; 3) Head-to-head points; 4) Head-to-head matches won; 5) Head-to-head goal difference; 6) Head-to-head goals scored; 7) Head-to-head away goals; 8) Goal difference; 9) Goals scored; 10) Away goals scored.
(O) Play-off winners; (R) Relegated

=== Russian Cup ===
22 September 2016 Round of 32	Shinnik Yaroslavl	0 – 2	Krylia Sovetov Samara	Yaroslavl
19:30 SAMT (UTC+4)	Gotsuk (yellow card) 55'; Malyshev (yellow card) 71'	Summary	Kornilenko 32'; Tkachyov (yellow card) 55' (goal) 56'	Stadium: Shinnik Stadium; Attendance: 1,200; Referee: Denis Shpilyov

27 October 2016 Round of 16	Krylia Sovetov Samara	1 – 3	Lokomotiv Moscow	Samara
19:00 SAMT (UTC+4)	Chochiyev 75'	Summary	Maicon 19'; Samedov 50'; Fernandes 63'	Stadium: Metallurg Stadium; Attendance: 4,841; Referee: Vladimir Seldyakov

== Squad statistics ==
As of Match played 21 May 2017

=== Appearances and goals ===
No.	Pos	Nat	Player	Total		Premier League		Russian Cup	
No.	Pos	Nat	Player	Apps	Goals	Apps	Goals	Apps	Goals
2	MF	(Russia) RUS	Yevgeni Bashkirov	23	0	18+4	0	0+1	0
3	DF	(Russia) RUS	Dmitri Yatchenko	29	2	28	2	1	0
4	DF	(Russia) RUS	Ivan Taranov	22	0	19+2	0	1	0
5	DF	(Russia) RUS	Ali Gadzhibekov	3	0	3	0	0	0
6	DF	(Brazil) BRA	Nadson	30	0	27+1	0	2	0
7	MF	(Russia) RUS	Alan Chochiyev	18	1	9+8	0	0+1	1
8	FW	(Belarus) BLR	Sergei Kornilenko	28	9	19+7	8	2	1
9	FW	(Finland) FIN	Berat Sadik	6	0	0+6	0	0	0
10	FW	(Italy) ITA	Cristian Pasquato	28	5	19+7	5	1+1	0
11	MF	(Belarus) BLR	Alexander Hleb	7	0	4+3	0	0	0
13	GK	(Russia) RUS	Yevgeni Konyukhov	7	0	5	0	2	0
16	MF	(Ukraine) UKR	Artem Hromov	3	0	2+1	0	0	0
17	GK	(Georgia (country)) GEO	Giorgi Loria	25	0	25	0	0	0
19	DF	(Trinidad and Tobago) TTO	Sheldon Bateau	22	0	17+3	0	2	0
20	MF	(Serbia) SRB	Srđan Mijailović	13	0	11+2	0	0	0
21	MF	(Russia) RUS	Vyacheslav Zinkov	14	0	7+6	0	1	0
27	MF	(Russia) RUS	Aleksandr Zuyev	11	0	8+3	0	0	0
28	FW	(Russia) RUS	Pavel Kudryashov	1	0	0+1	0	0	0
29	FW	(Belgium) BEL	Gianni Bruno	17	5	14+3	5	0	0
31	DF	(Russia) RUS	Georgi Zotov	10	1	10	1	0	0
33	DF	(Serbia) SRB	Milan Rodić	16	1	14+1	1	1	0
40	DF	(Russia) RUS	Sergei Bozhin	16	0	11+4	0	1	0
69	FW	(Russia) RUS	Yegor Golenkov	1	0	0+1	0	0	0
77	MF	(Russia) RUS	Sergei Tkachyov	21	3	12+8	2	1	1
98	FW	(Russia) RUS	Ilya Viznovich	3	0	0+2	0	1	0
Players away from the club on loan:
Players who left Krylia Sovetov during the season:
14	MF	(France) FRA	Yohan Mollo	13	5	12	5	1	0
15	DF	(Russia) RUS	Ibragim Tsallagov	19	0	17	0	1+1	0
23	FW	(Nigeria) NGR	Jerry Mbakogu	8	0	4+3	0	1	0
34	DF	(Russia) RUS	Timofei Margasov	7	0	3+2	0	1+1	0
45	DF	(Russia) RUS	Aleksei Kontsedalov	11	0	9	0	2	0

=== Goal scorers ===
Place	Position	Nation	Number	Name	Russian Premier League	Russian Cup	Total
1	FW	(Belarus)	8	Sergei Kornilenko	8	1	9
2	MF	(France)	14	Yohan Mollo	5	0	5
2	FW	(Italy)	10	Cristian Pasquato	5	0	5
2	FW	(Belgium)	29	Gianni Bruno	5	0	5
5	MF	(Russia)	77	Sergei Tkachyov	2	1	3
6	DF	(Russia)	3	Dmitri Yatchenko	2	0	2
6				Own goal	2	0	2
8	DF	(Serbia)	33	Milan Rodić	1	0	1
8	DF	(Russia)	31	Georgi Zotov	1	0	1
8	MF	(Russia)	7	Alan Chochiyev	0	1	1
				TOTALS	31	3	34

=== Disciplinary record ===
Number	Nation	Position	Name	Russian Premier League		Russian Cup		Total	
Number	Nation	Position	Name	Yellow card	Red card	Yellow card	Red card	Yellow card	Red card
2	(Russia)	MF	Yevgeni Bashkirov	2	1	0	0	2	1
3	(Russia)	DF	Dmitri Yatchenko	3	0	0	0	3	0
4	(Russia)	DF	Ivan Taranov	7	0	0	0	7	0
5	(Russia)	DF	Ali Gadzhibekov	1	0	0	0	1	0
6	(Brazil)	DF	Nadson	2	0	0	0	2	0
7	(Russia)	MF	Alan Chochiyev	3	0	0	0	3	0
8	(Belarus)	FW	Sergei Kornilenko	6	0	0	0	6	0
17	(Georgia (country))	GK	Giorgi Loria	1	0	0	0	1	0
19	(Trinidad and Tobago)	DF	Sheldon Bateau	2	0	0	0	2	0
20	(Serbia)	MF	Srđan Mijailović	1	0	0	0	1	0
21	(Russia)	MF	Vyacheslav Zinkov	3	1	0	0	3	1
23	(Nigeria)	FW	Jerry Mbakogu	1	0	0	0	1	0
29	(Belgium)	FW	Gianni Bruno	2	0	0	0	2	0
31	(Russia)	DF	Georgi Zotov	3	0	0	0	3	0
33	(Serbia)	DF	Milan Rodić	2	0	0	0	2	0
34	(Russia)	DF	Timofei Margasov	2	0	0	0	2	0
40	(Russia)	DF	Sergei Bozhin	4	0	0	0	4	0
77	(Russia)	MF	Sergei Tkachyov	4	0	1	0	5	0
			TOTALS	49	2	1	0	50	2
