= Maksim Vasilyev =

Maksim Vasilyev may refer to:

- Maksim Vasilyev (footballer, born 1974), Russian football manager and former defender/midfielder
- Maksim Vasilyev (footballer, born 1987), Russian football centre-back
- Maksim Vasilyev (footballer, born 1999), Russian football defender/midfielder
