= Milan Rodić =

Serbian footballer (born 1991)

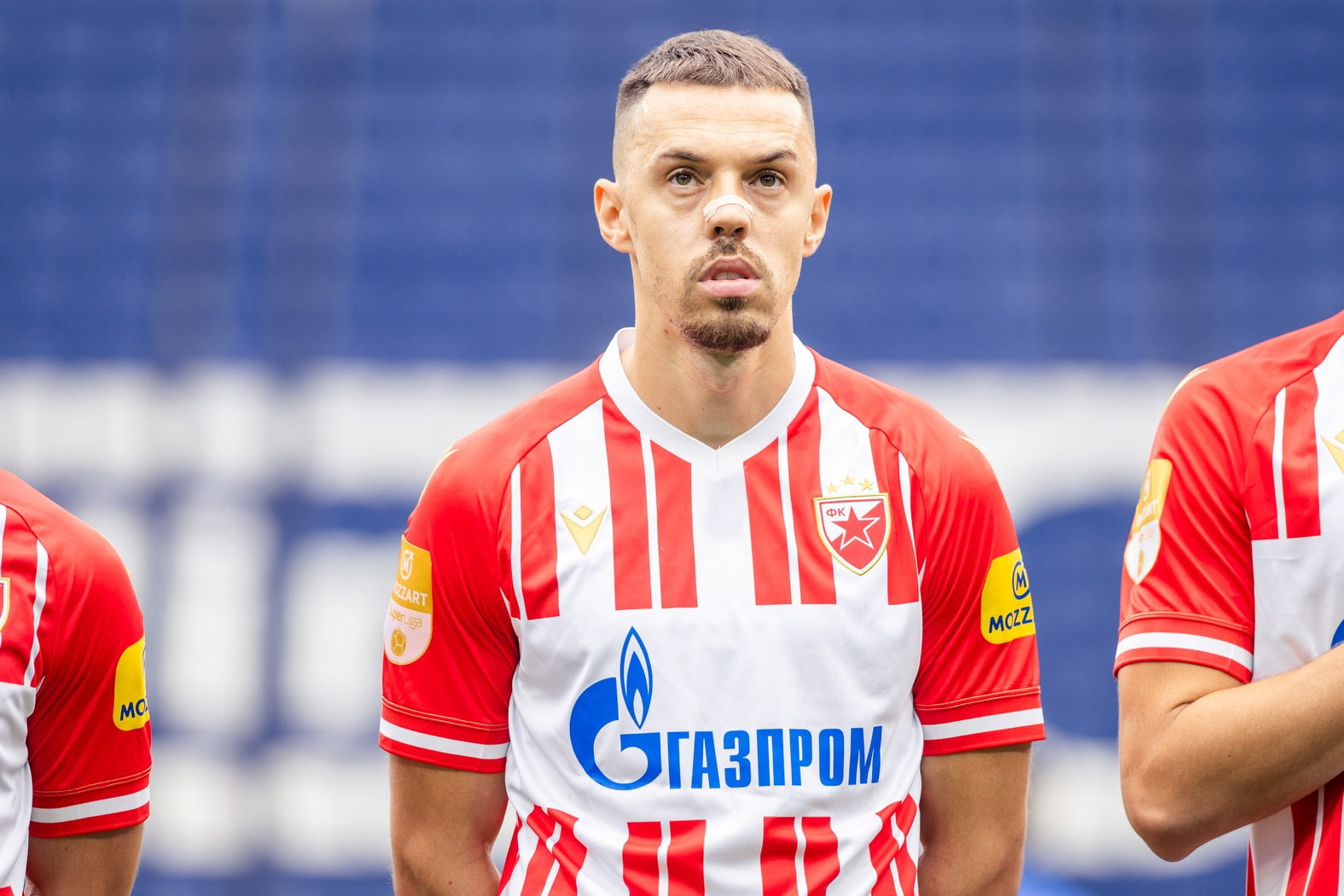
- Rodić in 2024

Personal information
- Date of birth: 2 April 1991 (age 35)
- Place of birth: Titov Drvar, SR Bosnia and Herzegovina, SFR Yugoslavia
- Height: 1.85 m (6 ft 1 in)
- Position: Left-back

Team information
- Current team: OFK Beograd
- Number: 23

Youth career
- OFK Beograd

Senior career*
Years	Team	Apps	(Gls)
2009–2013	OFK Beograd	71	(3)
2013–2015	Zenit Saint Petersburg	5	(0)
2013–2014	→ Volga Nizhny Novgorod (loan)	18	(0)
2015	→ Zenit-2 Saint Petersburg (loan)	4	(0)
2015–2017	Krylia Sovetov	33	(2)
2017–2025	Red Star Belgrade	196	(14)
2025–2026	FC Zürich	8	(0)
2026–	OFK Beograd	21	(3)

International career^{‡}
2011–2012	Serbia U21	8	(0)
2018–2019	Serbia	7	(0)
- * Club domestic league appearances and goals as of 21 November 2026 ‡ National team caps and goals as of 17 November 2019

Milan Rodić (Serbian Cyrillic: Милан Родић, pronounced [mǐlan rǒːditɕ]; born 2 April 1991) is a Serbian professional footballer who plays as a left-back for OFK Beograd.

== Club career ==
=== OFK Beograd ===
Rodić played his first professional match for OFK Beograd on 26 April 2009, against Partizan at the age of 18. Almost two years later, on 25 April 2012, he was named left-back in Sportal's ideal team of Round 26 in the 2011–12 Serbian SuperLiga.

=== Zenit Saint Petersburg ===
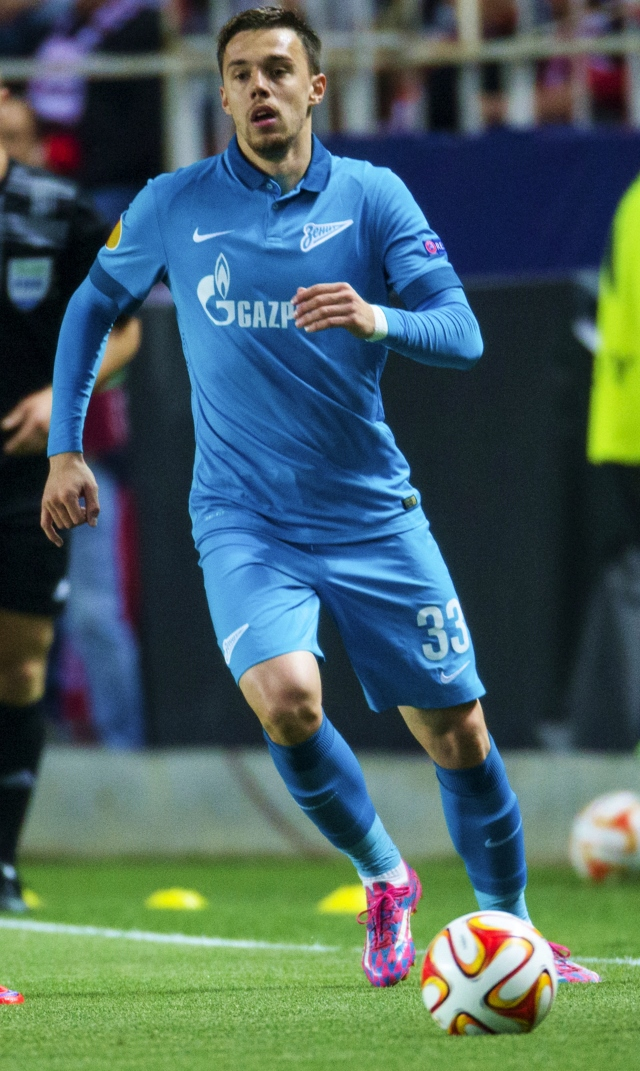
Rodić in action for Zenit Saint Petersburg

On 31 January 2013, Rodić signed a contract with Zenit Saint Petersburg. On 21 February 2013, coach Luciano Spalletti deployed Rodić in the 85th minute as a substitute for Sergei Semak against Liverpool in the 2012–13 UEFA Europa League. However, Rodić ended up playing only five matches for Zenit before being loaned out to FC Volga Nizhny Novgorod and Zenit's reserve team, after which he transferred to Krylia Sovetov.

=== Krylia Sovetov ===
In August 2015, Rodić signed with Krylia Sovetov. Over the course of two seasons, Rodić got back into competitive shape. After two years with Krylia Sovetov, Rodić thanked the fans and commented that he was happy to play for Krylia, but that he missed his family in Serbia.

=== Red Star Belgrade ===
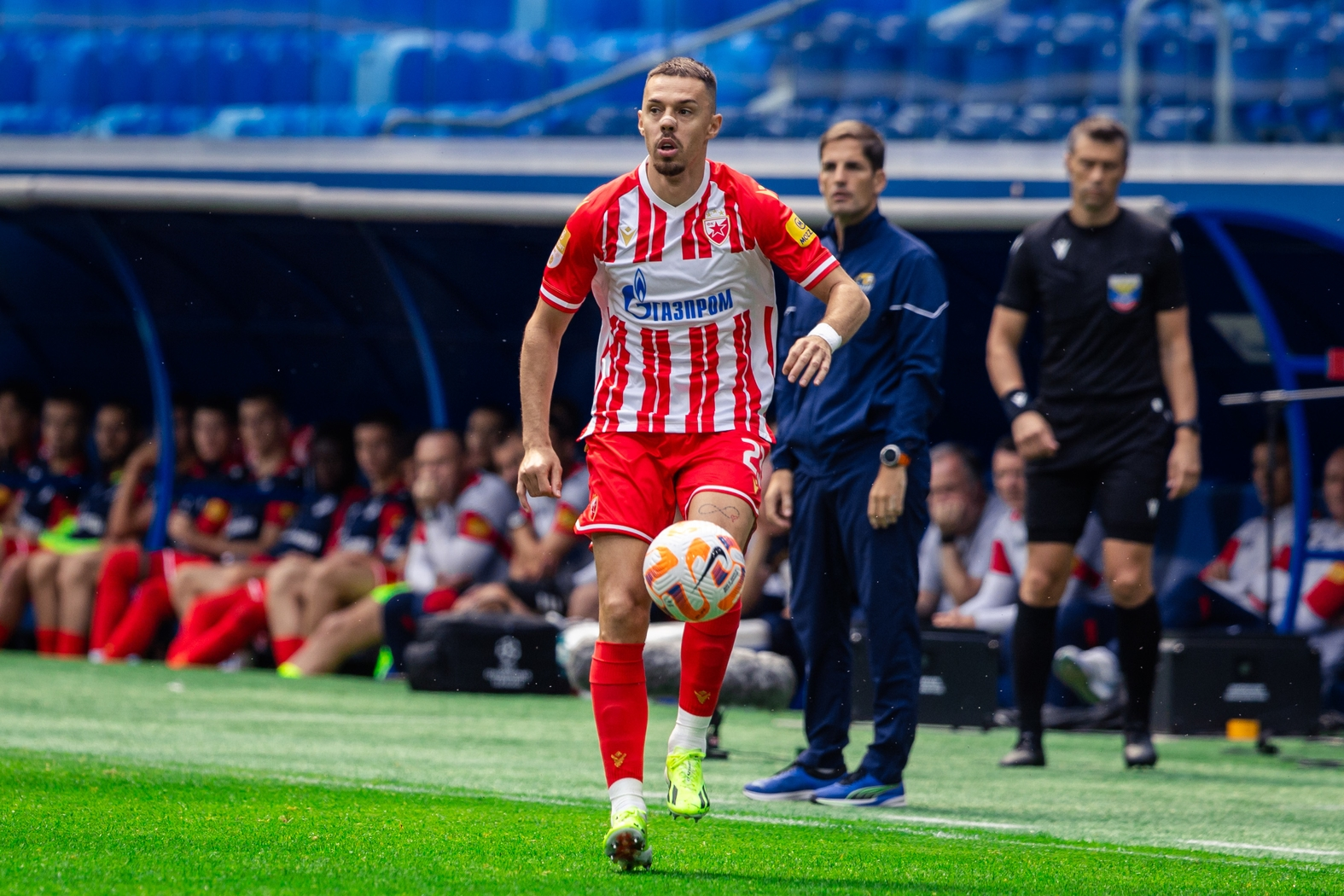
Jovančić with Red Star Belgrade in 2024

On 21 July 2017, Rodić signed a three-year contract with Serbian side Red Star Belgrade. Red Star had paid approximately €250,000 to Krylia Sovetov for Rodić's transfer. He played in Red Star's 2017–18 UEFA Europa League campaign under coach Vladan Milojević. On 19 October 2017, Rodić got a red card in the Group H home match against Arsenal, which Red Star lost 1–0. On 12 March 2019, he extended his contract with Red Star to the summer of 2022.

=== FC Zürich ===
In July 2025, Rodić signed for Swiss Super League club FC Zürich. He was released by the club in January 2026.

== International career ==
On 6 June 2011, Rodić made his debut with the Serbia national under-21 football team against Sweden's U-21 team. Five years later, Rodić got his first call up to the senior Serbia squad for a friendly match against Russia on 5 June 2016.

In May 2018 he was named in Serbia's preliminary squad for the 2018 FIFA World Cup in Russia. On 4 June, he made his international debut in a friendly match against Chile, coming on as a substitute for Aleksandar Kolarov in the 80th minute.

Rodić was selected in Serbia’s squad for the 2018 World Cup, but he failed to make any appearances there.

== Career statistics ==
=== Club ===
As of 24 May 2025

Appearances and goals by club, season and competition
Club	Season	League			National cup (Note: Includes Serbian Cup, Russian Cup)		Continental (Note: Includes UEFA Champions League, UEFA Europa League)		Other (Note: Includes Russian Super Cup)		Total	
Club	Season	Division	Apps	Goals	Apps	Goals	Apps	Goals	Apps	Goals	Apps	Goals
OFK Beograd	2008–09	Serbian SuperLiga	1	0	0	0	–		–		1	0
OFK Beograd	2009–10	Serbian SuperLiga	12	0	1	0	–		–		13	0
OFK Beograd	2010–11	Serbian SuperLiga	20	2	1	0	3 (Note: Appearances in UEFA Europa League)	0	–		24	2
OFK Beograd	2009–12	Serbian SuperLiga	25	1	2	0	–		–		27	1
OFK Beograd	2012–13	Serbian SuperLiga	13	0	3	2	–		–		16	2
OFK Beograd	Total		71	3	7	2	3	0	–		81	5
Zenit	2012–13	Russian Premier League	4	0	0	0	2	0	0	0	6	0
Zenit	2014–15	Russian Premier League	1	0	2	1	1	0	0	0	4	1
Zenit	Total		5	0	2	1	3	0	0	0	10	1
Volga (loan)	2013–14	Russian Premier League	18	0	0	0	–		–		18	0
Zenit-2 (loan)	2015–16	Russian National Football League	4	0	–		–		–		4	0
Krylia Sovetov	2015–16	Russian Premier League	16	1	1	1	–		–		17	2
Krylia Sovetov	2016–17	Russian Premier League	15	1	1	0	–		–		16	1
Krylia Sovetov	2017–18	Russian National Football League	2	0	–		–		–		2	0
Krylia Sovetov	Total		33	2	2	1	–		–		35	3
Red Star	2017–18	Serbian SuperLiga	29	3	1	0	9	0	–		39	3
Red Star	2018–19	Serbian SuperLiga	18	1	3	0	13 (Note: Appearances in UEFA Champions League)	0	–		34	1
Red Star	2019–20	Serbian SuperLiga	18	0	2	0	13	0	–		33	0
Red Star	2020–21	Serbian SuperLiga	28	1	3	0	8 (Note: Three appearances in UEFA Champions League, five appearances in UEFA Europa League)	0	–		39	1
Red Star	2021–22	Serbian SuperLiga	33	3	5	0	13 (Note: Four appearances in UEFA Champions League, nine appearances in UEFA Europa League)	1	–		51	4
Red Star	2022–23	Serbian SuperLiga	26	1	3	0	9	0	–		38	1
Red Star	2023–24	Serbian SuperLiga	26	3	2	0	6	0	–		34	3
Red Star	2024–25	Serbian SuperLiga	18	2	4	0	4	0	–		26	2
Red Star	Total		195	14	23	0	75	1	–		294	15
Career total			327	24	34	4	81	0	0	0	442	28

=== International ===
As of 17 November 2019

Appearances and goals by national team and year
National team	Year	Apps	Goals
Serbia	2018	5	0
Serbia	2019	2	0
Total		7	0

== Honours ==
Zenit Saint Petersburg

- Russian Football Premier League: 2014–15

Red Star Belgrade

- Serbian SuperLiga (8): 2017–18, 2018–19, 2019–20, 2020–21, 2021–22, 2022–23, 2023–24, 2024–25
- Serbian Cup (4): 2020–21, 2021–22, 2022–23, 2023–24

Individual

- Serbian SuperLiga Player of the Week: 2021–22 (Round 13)
- Serbian SuperLiga Team of the Season: 2023–24
