= Maksim Vasilyev (footballer, born 1974) =

Russian footballer

Personal information
- Full name: Maksim Yuryevich Vasilyev
- Date of birth: 2 September 1974 (age 52)
- Place of birth: Belgorod, Russian SFSR
- Height: 1.84 m (6 ft 0 in)
- Positions: Defender; midfielder

Senior career*
Years	Team	Apps	(Gls)
1990–1991	FC Rostselmash Rostov-on-Don	0	(0)
1992–1994	FC Salyut Belgorod	52	(6)
1995	FC Dynamo-d Moscow	38	(5)
1996	FC Arsenal Tula	29	(6)
1997	FC Salyut-YuKOS Belgorod	36	(14)
1998–1999	FC Fakel Voronezh	39	(2)
1999	FC Lokomotiv Liski	13	(1)
2000	FC Metallurg Lipetsk	8	(0)
2001–2009	FC Salyut-Energia Belgorod	211	(17)

Managerial career
- 2010: FC Salyut Belgorod (assistant)
- 2011–2012: FC Salyut Belgorod
- 2012–2013: FC Salyut Belgorod (assistant)
- 2013: FC Salyut Belgorod (caretaker)
- 2018–2019: FC Salyut Belgorod
- * Club domestic league appearances and goals

Maksim Yuryevich Vasilyev (Russian: Максим Юрьевич Васильев; born 2 September 1974) is a Russian professional football coach and a former player.

== Club career ==
He made his Russian Football National League debut for FC Energomash Belgorod on 6 May 1992 in a game against FC APK Azov.
