= Sergei Tkachyov =

Russian footballer

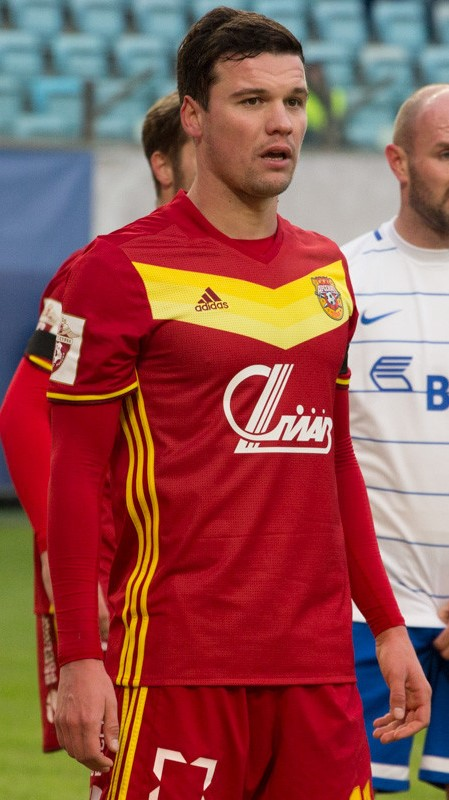
- Tkachyov with Arsenal Tula in 2018

Personal information
- Full name: Sergei Anatolyevich Tkachyov
- Date of birth: 19 May 1989 (age 37)
- Place of birth: Boguchar, Russian SFSR
- Height: 1.84 m (6 ft 0 in)
- Position: Midfielder

Senior career*
Years	Team	Apps	(Gls)
2008	FCS-73 Voronezh	24	(3)
2009–2010	Krylia Sovetov	19	(2)
2011–2013	Metalist Kharkiv	10	(0)
2012	→ Ural Yekaterinburg (loan)	14	(3)
2012–2013	→ Sevastopol (loan)	13	(8)
2013–2015	Lokomotiv Moscow	23	(3)
2015	→ Kuban Krasnodar (loan)	11	(4)
2015	Kuban Krasnodar	16	(3)
2016–2019	CSKA Moscow	8	(0)
2016–2017	→ Krylia Sovetov (loan)	20	(2)
2017–2019	→ Arsenal Tula (loan)	54	(11)
2019–2023	Arsenal Tula	96	(13)
2023	Rodina Moscow	4	(0)
2023–2025	Arsenal Tula	53	(6)

International career
2008	Russia U-19	4	(0)
- * Club domestic league appearances and goals as of 24 May 2025

Sergei Anatolyevich Tkachyov (Russian: Серге́й Анатольевич Ткачёв; born 19 May 1989) is a Russian former professional footballer who played as a right midfielder or attacking midfielder.

== Club career ==
On 11 January 2016, Tkachyov signed a four-year contract with CSKA Moscow.

On 2 July 2018, Tkachyov returned to FC Arsenal Tula on a season-long loan deal. Tkachyov scored five goals in 25 Russian Premier League matches during the 2018–19 season.

On 27 June 2019, he moved to Arsenal on a permanent basis, signing a 2-year contract.

== Career statistics ==
=== Club ===
As of 21 May 2022

Club	Season	League			Cup		Continental		Total	
Club	Season	Division	Apps	Goals	Apps	Goals	Apps	Goals	Apps	Goals
FCS-73 Voronezh	2008	PFL	24	3	1	1	–		25	4
Krylia Sovetov Samara	2009	RPL	3	0	0	0	–		3	0
Krylia Sovetov Samara	2010	RPL	16	2	1	0	–		17	2
Metalist Kharkiv	2010–11	UPL	7	0	–		0	0	7	0
Metalist Kharkiv	2011–12	UPL	3	0	2	1	1 (Note: Appearances in the UEFA Europa League)	0	6	1
Metalist Kharkiv	Total		10	0	2	1	1	0	13	1
Ural Yekaterinburg	2011–12	FNL	14	3	–		–		14	3
Sevastopol	2012–13	UFL	13	8	2	2	–		15	10
Lokomotiv Moscow	2013–14	RPL	19	3	0	0	–		19	3
Lokomotiv Moscow	2014–15	RPL	4	0	2	0	0	0	6	0
Lokomotiv Moscow	Total		23	3	2	0	0	0	25	3
Kuban Krasnodar	2014–15	RPL	11	4	3	0	–		14	4
Kuban Krasnodar	2015–16	RPL	16	3	1	0	–		17	3
Kuban Krasnodar	Total		27	7	4	0	0	0	31	7
CSKA Moscow	2015–16	RPL	8	0	3	0	–		11	0
Krylia Sovetov Samara	2016–17	RPL	20	2	1	1	–		21	3
Krylia Sovetov Samara	Total		39	4	2	1	0	0	41	5
Arsenal Tula	2017–18	RPL	28	6	1	0	–		29	6
Arsenal Tula	2018–19	RPL	26	5	4	0	–		30	5
Arsenal Tula	2019–20	RPL	27	2	2	1	2	0	31	3
Arsenal Tula	2020–21	RPL	21	3	2	0	–		23	3
Arsenal Tula	2021–22	RPL	20	2	1	0	–		21	2
Arsenal Tula	Total		122	18	10	1	2	0	134	19
Career total			280	46	26	6	3	0	309	52

== Honours ==
Lokomotiv Moscow

- Russian Cup: 2014–15 (played in the early stages of the competition)

Kuban Krasnodar

- Russian Cup finalist: 2014–15 (played in the late stages of the competition)
