= Yevgeni Bashkirov =

Russian footballer

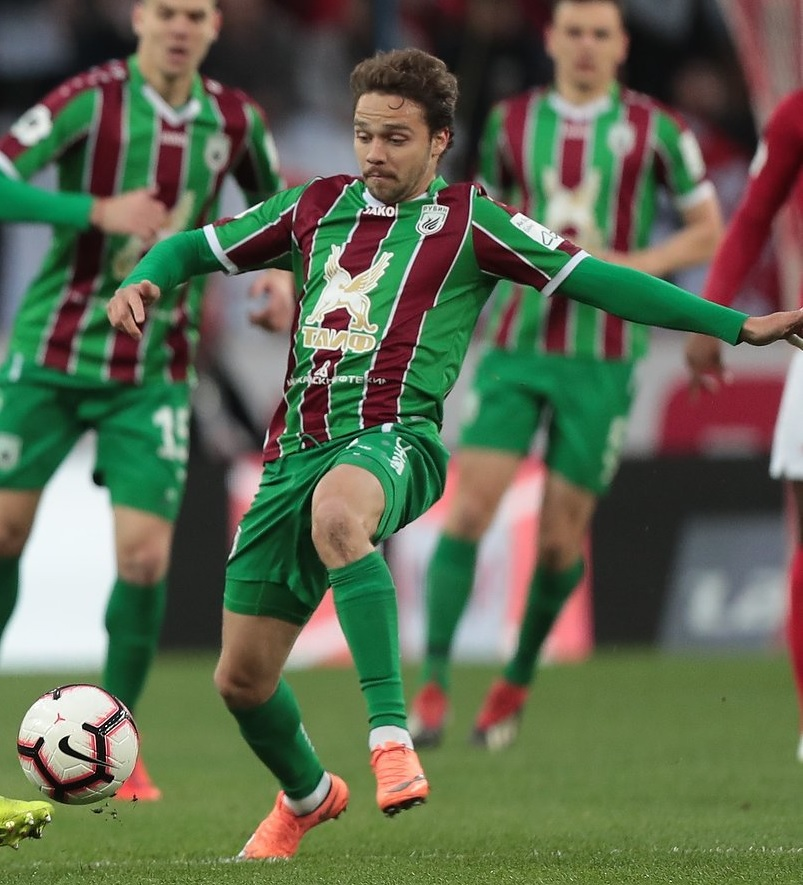
- Bashkirov with Rubin Kazan in 2019

Personal information
- Full name: Yevgeni Olegovich Bashkirov
- Date of birth: 6 July 1991 (age 35)
- Place of birth: Leningrad, Russia
- Height: 1.75 m (5 ft 9 in)
- Position: Midfielder

Team information
- Current team: Gnistan
- Number: 44

Youth career
- 2009–2012: Zenit Saint Petersburg

Senior career*
Years	Team	Apps	(Gls)
2012–2013	Zenit Saint Petersburg	0	(0)
2012–2013	→ Tom Tomsk (loan)	11	(0)
2013–2016	Tom Tomsk	91	(6)
2016–2018	Krylia Sovetov Samara	69	(1)
2019–2020	Rubin Kazan	23	(2)
2020–2022	Zagłębie Lubin	43	(4)
2023–2024	VPS	55	(8)
2025–	Gnistan	30	(3)

International career
2009–2010	Russia U19	7	(4)
- * Club domestic league appearances and goals as of 19 November 2025

Yevgeni Olegovich Bashkirov (Russian: Евгений Олегович Башкиров; born 6 July 1991) is a Russian professional footballer who plays as a defensive and central midfielder for Finnish Veikkausliiga club Gnistan.

== Career ==
Bashkirov is a graduate of the Zenit football academy. He then played at Zenit Saint Petersburg youth team.

He made his professional debut for FC Tom Tomsk on 26 September 2012 in the Russian Cup game against PFC CSKA Moscow.

On 31 January 2019, he signed a 1.5-year contract with Rubin Kazan. On 24 February 2020, his contract with Rubin was terminated by mutual consent.

=== Zagłębie Lubin ===
On 26 February 2020, he signed with Polish club Zagłębie Lubin until the end of June 2020 with an extension option. Having made no appearances since September 2021 due to injuries, and with less than three months left on his contract, Bashkirov left Zagłębie by mutual consent on 12 April 2022, partly due to pressure affected by the Russian Invasion of Ukraine.

==== Without club ====
After having terminated his contract, Bashkirov was without club for the rest of 2022. He lived in Turkey for a couple of months, and had unsuccessful negotiations with a club from Andorra. During the 2022 FIFA World Cup, Bashkirov travelled to Qatar and produced podcast episodes for an independent Russian radio station.

=== VPS ===
On 10 March 2023, after a trial with Finnish second-tier clubs KPV and SalPa, Bashkirov signed a two-year contract with Vaasan Palloseura (VPS) in the Finnish premier league, Veikkausliiga. At the end of his first season with VPS, Bashkirov helped the club to finish 3rd in the league, and was named in the Veikkausliiga Team of the Year, and the Midfielder of the Year. Next 2024 season, Bashkirov was named one of the team captains. He also represented VPS in the UEFA Conference League qualifiers, making his first appearances in a European competition in his career. In late November 2024, Bashkirov announced he would leave VPS after the expiration of his contract.

=== Gnistan ===
On 29 November 2024, a fellow Veikkausliiga club Gnistan announced the signing of Bashkirov. He joined the Northern Helsinki-based club on a two-year deal.

== International career ==
Bashkirov has represented Russia at under-19 youth international level.

== Personal life ==
Bashkirov was born in Saint Petersburg to a cultural family. His father's sport was diving and his mother competed in orienteering. Bashkirov has written poems since he was a child, and has expressed his devotion for literature. He is a fluent English speaker.

Bashkirov has publicly condemned the Russian invasion of Ukraine on several occasions.

Bashkirov is married and lives together with his wife Katja in Finland.

== Career statistics ==
As of 11 March 2025

Appearances and goals by club, season and competition
Club	Season	League			National cup (Note: Includes Russian Cup, Polish Cup and Suomen Cup)		Europe		Other		Total	
Club	Season	Division	Apps	Goals	Apps	Goals	Apps	Goals	Apps	Goals	Apps	Goals
Tom Tomsk (loan)	2012–13	FNL	11	0	1	0	—		—		12	0
Tom Tomsk	2013–14	Russian Premier League	24	2	2	0	—		—		26	2
Tom Tomsk	2014–15	FNL	35	3	1	0	—		—		36	3
Tom Tomsk	2015–16	FNL	32	1	1	0	—		—		33	1
Tom Tomsk	Total		91	6	4	0	0	0	0	0	95	6
Krylia Sovetov Samara	2016–17	Russian Premier League	22	0	1	0	—		—		23	1
Krylia Sovetov Samara	2017–18	FNL	32	1	3	1	—		—		35	2
Krylia Sovetov Samara	2018–19	Russian Premier League	15	0	2	0	—		—		17	0
Krylia Sovetov Samara	Total		69	1	6	1	0	0	0	0	75	2
Rubin Kazan	2018–19	Russian Premier League	12	1	1	0	—		—		13	1
Rubin Kazan	2019–20	Russian Premier League	11	1	1	0	—		—		12	1
Rubin Kazan	Total		23	2	2	0	0	0	0	0	25	2
Zagłębie Lubin	2019–20	Ekstraklasa	12	2	0	0	—		—		12	2
Zagłębie Lubin	2020–21	Ekstraklasa	25	1	2	1	—		—		27	2
Zagłębie Lubin	2021–22	Ekstraklasa	6	1	0	0	—		—		6	1
Zagłębie Lubin	Total		43	4	2	1	0	0	0	0	45	5
VPS	2023	Veikkausliiga	28	5	1	0	—		0	0	29	5
VPS	2024	Veikkausliiga	27	3	1	0	2 (Note: Appearances in UEFA Conference League)	0	5 (Note: Appearances in Finnish League Cup)	0	35	3
VPS	Total		55	8	2	0	2	0	5	0	64	8
Gnistan	2025	Veikkausliiga	0	0	0	0	—		2	0	2	0
Career total			292	21	17	2	2	0	7	0	319	23

== Honours ==
=== Individual ===
- Veikkausliiga Team of the Year: 2023
- Veikkausliiga Midfielder of the Year: 2023
