= Oleg Roganov =

Russian footballer

Personal information
- Full name: Oleg Andreyevich Roganov
- Date of birth: 26 April 1995 (age 31)
- Place of birth: Tolyatti, Russia
- Height: 1.82 m (6 ft 0 in)
- Position: Defender

Team information
- Current team: FC Krylia Sovetov-2 Samara
- Number: 43

Youth career
- FC Lada-Togliatti

Senior career*
Years	Team	Apps	(Gls)
2012–2016	FC Krylia Sovetov Samara	0	(0)
2016–2017	FC Dacia Chișinău	11	(0)
2018	FC Lada-Togliatti	12	(0)
2019–2020	FC Chelyabinsk	20	(1)
2020–	FC Krylia Sovetov-2 Samara	24	(1)
- * Club domestic league appearances and goals as of 15 June 2021

Oleg Andreyevich Roganov (Russian: Олег Андреевич Роганов; born 26 April 1995) is a Russian football player. He plays for FC Krylia Sovetov-2 Samara.

== Club career ==
He made his debut in the Russian Professional Football League for FC Lada-Togliatti on 3 August 2018 in a game against FC Zenit-Izhevsk.
