= Danila Yermakov =

Russian footballer

Personal information
- Full name: Danila Dmitriyevich Yermakov
- Date of birth: 29 December 1998 (age 27)
- Place of birth: Samara, Russia
- Height: 1.88 m (6 ft 2 in)
- Position: Goalkeeper

Team information
- Current team: F.C. Kiryat Yam
- Number: 70

Youth career
- PFC Krylia Sovetov Samara
- 2016–2018: FC Rostov
- 2018–2019: FC Spartak Moscow

Senior career*
Years	Team	Apps	(Gls)
2017–2018	FC Rostov	0	(0)
2018–2019	FC Spartak-2 Moscow	3	(0)
2019–2021	FC Fakel Voronezh	19	(0)
2020–2021	→ FC Fakel-M Voronezh	12	(0)
2022	FC Saturn Ramenskoye	0	(0)
2023	FC Khimik-Avgust Vurnary	10	(0)
2023–2024	FC Volga Ulyanovsk	1	(0)
2025	Medialiga	1	(0)
2025–2026	Broke Boys Moscow	1	(0)
2026–	F.C. Kiryat Yam	3	(0)
- * Club domestic league appearances and goals as of 8 June 2026

Danila Dmitriyevich Yermakov (Russian: Данила Дмитриевич Ермаков; born 29 December 1998) is a Russian football player who plays as a goalkeeper for Israeli Liga Leumit club F.C. Kiryat Yam.

== Club career ==
He made his debut in the Russian Football National League for FC Spartak-2 Moscow on 17 July 2018 in a game against PFC Sochi.
