= Anton Bocharov =

Russian football player

Personal information
- Full name: Anton Dmitriyevich Bocharov
- Date of birth: 14 January 1995 (age 31)
- Place of birth: Samara, Russia
- Height: 1.78 m (5 ft 10 in)
- Positions: Defender; midfielder

Team information
- Current team: Izhevsk
- Number: 21

Senior career*
Years	Team	Apps	(Gls)
2013–2016	Krylia Sovetov Samara	0	(0)
2014–2015	→ Syzran-2003 (loan)	20	(0)
2015	→ Lada-Tolyatti (loan)	17	(0)
2016	→ Nosta Novotroitsk (loan)	9	(0)
2016–2017	Nosta Novotroitsk	23	(0)
2017	Zenit-Izhevsk	14	(2)
2018–2019	Nizhny Novgorod	13	(0)
2019	→ Syzran-2003 (loan)	10	(2)
2019	KAMAZ Naberezhnye Chelny	15	(1)
2020–2021	Tyumen	42	(3)
2022–2024	Amkar Perm	70	(1)
2025	Khimik Dzerzhinsk	19	(2)
2026–	Izhevsk	29	(1)
- * Club domestic league appearances and goals as of 1 November 2026

Anton Dmitriyevich Bocharov (Russian: Антон Дмитриевич Бочаров; born 14 January 1995) is a Russian football player who plays for Izhevsk.

== Club career ==
He made his professional debut in the Russian Professional Football League for Syzran-2003 on 18 July 2014 in a game against Rubin-2 Kazan.

He made his Russian Football National League debut for Olimpiyets Nizhny Novgorod on 10 March 2018 in a game against Sibir Novosibirsk.
