= Vyacheslav Zinkov =

Russian footballer

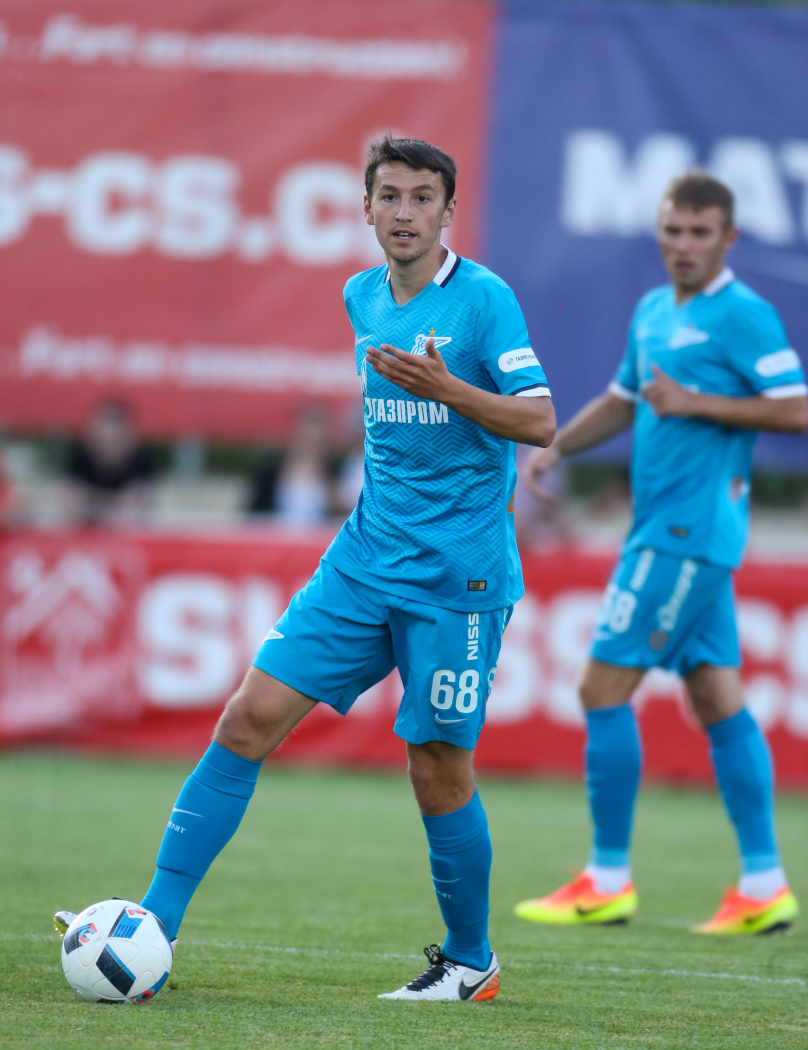
- Zinkov with Zenit in 2016

Personal information
- Full name: Vyacheslav Sergeyevich Zinkov
- Date of birth: 26 May 1993 (age 33)
- Place of birth: Petrozavodsk, Russia
- Height: 1.87 m (6 ft 2 in)
- Positions: Midfielder; defender

Team information
- Current team: FC Khimik Dzerzhinsk
- Number: 8

Youth career
- DYuSSh Smena-Zenit

Senior career*
Years	Team	Apps	(Gls)
2011–2016	FC Zenit Saint Petersburg	1	(0)
2013–2016	FC Zenit-2 Saint Petersburg	87	(9)
2016–2018	FC Krylia Sovetov Samara	26	(0)
2018	→ FC Zenit-2 Saint Petersburg (loan)	11	(0)
2019	FC Veles Moscow	5	(1)
2019–2025	FC Shinnik Yaroslavl	173	(8)
2025–	FC Khimik Dzerzhinsk	33	(0)
- * Club domestic league appearances and goals as of 1 November 2026

Vyacheslav Sergeyevich Zinkov (Russian: Вячеслав Сергеевич Зинков; born 26 May 1993) is a Russian professional football player who plays for FC Khimik Dzerzhinsk.

== Club career ==
He made his debut in the Russian Premier League on 26 May 2013 for FC Zenit Saint Petersburg in a game against FC Amkar Perm. He made his second appearance for Zenit on 23 September 2015 in a Russian Cup game against FC Volga Tver.
