= Vitali Kalenkovich =

Russian footballer (born 1993)

Personal information
- Full name: Vitali Olegovich Kalenkovich
- Date of birth: 3 March 1993 (age 33)
- Place of birth: Kaliningrad, Russia
- Height: 1.80 m (5 ft 11 in)
- Positions: Defender; midfielder

Senior career*
Years	Team	Apps	(Gls)
2011–2015	FC Baltika Kaliningrad	101	(4)
2016	FC Krylia Sovetov Samara	0	(0)
2016–2019	FC Baltika Kaliningrad	97	(3)
2019–2020	FC Tom Tomsk	19	(0)
2021	Narva Trans	27	(0)
2022	FC Salyut Belgorod	8	(0)
2023	FC Kyzyltash Bakhchisaray		
- * Club domestic league appearances and goals

Vitali Olegovich Kalenkovich (Russian: Виталий Олегович Каленкович; born 3 March 1993) is a Russian former professional football player.

== Club career ==
He made his Russian Football National League debut for FC Baltika Kaliningrad on 2 May 2012 in a game against FC SKA-Energiya Khabarovsk.
