= Maksim Pavlov =

Russian footballer

Personal information
- Full name: Maksim Vladimirovich Pavlov
- Date of birth: 26 May 1989 (age 37)
- Place of birth: Tolyatti, Russian SFSR
- Height: 1.92 m (6 ft 3 1/2 in)
- Position: Goalkeeper

Youth career
- FC Lada Togliatti

Senior career*
Years	Team	Apps	(Gls)
2007–2009	FC Lada Togliatti	25	(0)
2010	FC Akademiya Togliatti	7	(0)
2012	FC Gubkin	0	(0)
2012–2014	FC Lada-Togliatti	30	(0)
2014–2016	FC KAMAZ Naberezhnye Chelny	37	(0)
2016–2017	FC Krylia Sovetov Samara	0	(0)
2017	→ FC Lada-Togliatti (loan)	4	(0)
2017–2019	FC Volga Ulyanovsk	27	(0)
2019–2020	FC Kaluga	16	(0)
- * Club domestic league appearances and goals

Maksim Vladimirovich Pavlov (Russian: Максим Владимирович Павлов; born 26 May 1989) is a Russian former professional football player.

== Club career ==
He made his Russian Football National League debut for FC KAMAZ Naberezhnye Chelny on 11 July 2015 in a game against FC Gazovik Orenburg.
