= Maksim Vasilyev (footballer, born 1999) =

Russian footballer

Personal information
- Full name: Maksim Sergeyevich Vasilyev
- Date of birth: 10 February 1999 (age 27)
- Place of birth: Novosibirsk, Russia
- Height: 1.84 m (6 ft 0 in)
- Positions: Defender; midfielder

Senior career*
Years	Team	Apps	(Gls)
2016–2017	FC Krylia Sovetov Samara	0	(0)
2017–2018	FC Krylia Sovetov-2 Samara	13	(0)
2018–2019	FC Sibir Novosibirsk	11	(1)
2018–2019	→ FC Sibir-2 Novosibirsk	12	(0)
2019–2020	FC Chayka Peschanokopskoye	27	(0)
2021	FC Novosibirsk	9	(1)
2022	FC Chita	9	(0)
- * Club domestic league appearances and goals

Maksim Sergeyevich Vasilyev (Russian: Максим Сергеевич Васильев; born 10 February 1999) is a Russian former football player.

== Club career ==
He made his debut in the Russian Professional Football League for FC Krylia Sovetov-2 Samara on 3 August 2017 in a game against FC Anzhi-Yunior Zelenodolsk.

He made his Russian Football National League debut for FC Sibir Novosibirsk on 1 September 2018 in a game against FC Tambov.
