= 2015–16 Russian Cup =

Tournament details
- Country: Russia
- Teams: 97

Final positions
- Champions: Zenit Saint Petersburg (3rd title)
- Runners-up: CSKA Moscow

Tournament statistics
- Matches played: 100
- Goals scored: 252 (2.52 per match)
- Top goal scorer: Denis Tkachuk (3 goals)

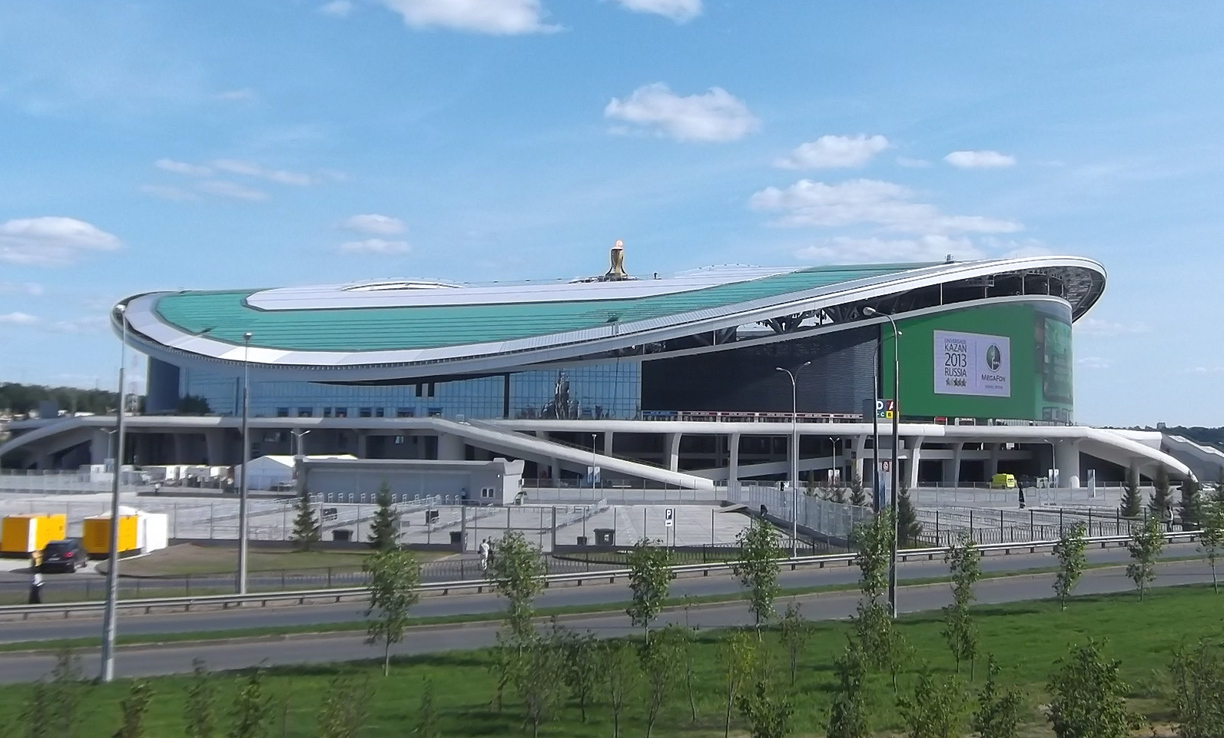

The 2015–16 Russian Cup, known as the 2015–16 Pirelli–Russian Football Cup for sponsorship reasons, was the 24th season of the Russian football knockout tournament since the dissolution of Soviet Union.

The competition started on 15 July 2015. The cup champion won a spot in the 2016–17 UEFA Europa League group stage.

The final match was played on 2 May 2016 at the Kazan Arena in Kazan.

== First round ==
The games were played on 15 and 16 July 2015.

15 July 2015	Alania Vladikavkaz (3)	0–1	Dynamo Stavropol (3)	Vladikavkaz
		Match Protocol (in Russian)	Magomedov 32'	Stadium: Stadion Spartak - Zapasnoe pole Attendance: 500; Referee: Stanislav Poda (Elista)

15 July 2015	Angusht Nazran (3)	3–1	Mashuk-KMV Pyatigorsk (3)	Nazran
	Z. Konov 8', 64'; A. Konov 17'	Match Protocol (in Russian)	Aleksandr Nesterenko 87'	Stadium: Stadion Central'nyj im. Rashida Ausheva; Attendance: 300; Referee: Aleksandr Gurenko (Astrakhan)

15 July 2015	Chertanovo Moscow (3)	4–0	FC Kaluga (3)	Moscow
	Kosyanchuk 30', 56'; Sergei Khrapov 72' (o.g.); Sarveli 76'	Match Protocol (in Russian)		Stadium: Stadion Yantar'; Attendance: 250; Referee: Alexandr Ksenofontov (Stupino)

15 July 2015	MITOS Novocherkassk (3)	3–4	SKA Rostov-on-Don (3)	Taganrog
	Fekolkin 7'; Mironik 45' (o.g.); Garayev 54'	Match Protocol (in Russian)	Podbeltsev 13'; Borisov 49'; Vyacheslav Bokov 59' (pen.), 90+'	Stadium: Stadion Torpedo; Attendance: 500; Referee: Igor Holin (Maykop)

15 July 2015	Druzhba Maykop (3)	1–2	Biolog-Novokubansk Progress (3)	Maykop
	Datkhuzhev 34' (pen.)	Match Protocol (in Russian)	Sergei Kamynin 40'; Vitali Kirichenko 62'	Stadium: Stadion Druzhba; Attendance: 400; Referee: Dmitry Streltsov (Rostov-on-Don)

15 July 2015	Solyaris Moscow (3)	0–1	Torpedo Vladimir (3)	Moscow
		Match Protocol (in Russian)	Alan Bolloyev 20'	Stadium: Spartakovets imeni N.P. Starostina; Attendance: 300; Referee: Aleksey Kuznetsov (Ivanovo)

16 July 2015	Metallurg Asha (4)	1–2	FC Chelyabinsk (3)	Asha
	Rostislav Gritsenko 8'	Match Protocol (in Russian)	Fedosyuk 50'; Bystrov 55'	Stadium: Stadion Metallurg; Attendance: 700; Referee: Vitali Chumenko (Orenburg)

16 July 2015	Zenit Penza (3)	0–2	Tambov (3)	Penza
		Match Protocol (in Russian)	Andreev 30'; Tynyany 90+'	Stadium: Stadion Pervomayskiy; Attendance: 1500; Referee: Maxim Matyunin (Moscow)

16 July 2015	Znamya Truda (3)	1–3	Dolgiye Prudy (3)	Orekhovo-Zuyevo
	Yerokhin 78'	Match Protocol (in Russian)	Rogov 22', 47'; Povarnitsyn 44'	Stadium: Sportkompleks Znamja Truda; Attendance: 1000; Referee: Ilya Trishin (Balashiha)

16 July 2015	Avangard Kursk (3)	2–0	FC Oryol (3)	Kursk
	Yesikov 64'; Michurenkov 79'	Match Protocol (in Russian)		Stadium: Stadion Trudovye Reservy; Attendance: 1200; Referee: Evgeny Gherasimenko (Bryansk)

16 July 2015	Dynamo Bryansk (3)	2–0	Dnepr Smolensk (3)	Bryansk
	Tomilin 24'; Tolstykh 44'	Match Protocol (in Russian)		Stadium: Dynamo Stadium; Attendance: 1000; Referee: Anton Frolov (Moscow)

16 July 2015	Karelia Petrozavodsk (3)	0–0 (a.e.t.) (4–2 p)	Dynamo Saint Petersburg (3)	Petrozavodsk
		Match Protocol (in Russian)		Stadium: Stadion Spartak; Attendance: 2000; Referee: Denis Savin (Leningrad)
	Penalties
	Klyuyev (penalty scored); Kiselyov (penalty scored); Kaloshin (penalty missed); Gavrilin (penalty scored); Borisov (penalty scored)		Artyom Katashevsky (penalty scored); Komisov (penalty scored); Anton Ivanov (penalty missed); Kulishev (penalty missed)

16 July 2015	Lokomotiv Liski (3)	0–0 (a.e.t.) (3–2 p)	Energomash Belgorod (3)	Liski
		Match Protocol (in Russian)		Stadium: Stadion Lokomotiv; Attendance: 1000; Referee: Vladimir Pevchev (Kursk)
	Penalties
	Baulchev (penalty missed); Sereda (penalty missed); Artyom Struchkov (penalty missed); Igor Fateyev (penalty scored); Tkachyov (penalty scored); Murtazov (penalty scored)		Burmistrov (penalty scored); Sergei Kudrin (penalty missed); Semeykin (penalty missed); Belobayev (penalty missed); Kalugin (penalty scored); Shtypula (penalty missed)

16 July 2015	Tekstilshchik Ivanovo (3)	2–2 (a.e.t.) (1–4 p)	Volga Tver (3)	Ivanovo
	Budanov 45'; Kostin 112'	Match Protocol (in Russian)	Urkhov 28'; Vinogradov 115'	Stadium: Stadion Tekstilshchik; Attendance: 1525; Referee: Evgeny Kudryashov (Vologda)
	Penalties
	Shchanitsyn (penalty missed); Dikov (penalty scored); Morozov (penalty missed)		Korovushkin (penalty scored); Urkhov (penalty scored); Alborov (penalty scored); Nastusenko (penalty scored)

16 July 2015	Dynamo Kostroma (4)	0–2	Spartak Kostroma (3)	Karavaevo
		Match Protocol (in Russian)	Krupoder 44', 90+'	Stadium: Stadion Urozhaj; Attendance: 1300; Referee: Ilya Bugrov (Rybinsk)

16 July 2015	FC Khimki (3)	2–0	FC Kolomna (3)	Khimki
	Kazayev 5'; Rodionov 90+'	Match Protocol (in Russian)		Stadium: Rodina Stadium; Attendance: 600; Referee: Sergey Ceban (Moscow)

16 July 2015	Vityaz Podolsk (3)	0–1	Torpedo Moscow (3)	Podolsk
		Match Protocol (in Russian)	Konstantin Pavlov 67'	Stadium: Trud Stadium; Attendance: 3000; Referee: Aleksey Amelin (Tula)

16 July 2015	Zvezda Saint Petersburg (4)	1–2	Pskov-747 (3)	Saint Petersburg
	Brusnikin 72'	Match Protocol (in Russian)	Proshin 39', 55'	Stadium: Stadion Nova Arena; Attendance: 750; Referee: Artur Fedorov (Petrozavodsk)

16 July 2015	FC Strogino Moscow (3)	0–0 (a.e.t.) (7–8 p)	Domodedovo Moscow (3)	Moscow
		Match Protocol (in Russian)		Stadium: Stadion Yantar'; Attendance: 500; Referee: Dmitri Smirnov (Moscow)
	Penalties
	Kuftin (penalty scored); Pronkin (penalty missed); Borsuk (penalty scored); Sergeyev (penalty scored); Zayerko (penalty scored); Drozdov (penalty scored); Dragunov (penalty scored); Nasedkin (penalty scored); Ivashchenko (penalty missed)		Gavryuk (penalty scored); Shestakov (penalty missed); Bolshakov (penalty scored); Sapronov (penalty scored) (penalty scored); Muradov (penalty scored); Korotkov (penalty scored); Samokhvalov (penalty scored); Yusipov (penalty scored)

== Second round ==
Matches were played on 24, 26 and 31 July 2015

24 July 2015	FC Zenit-Izhevsk (3)	1–0	Dynamo Kirov (3)	Izhevsk
	Simanov 78'	Match Protocol (in Russian)		Stadium: Stadion Central'nyj Zenit; Attendance: 2000; Referee: Maksim Sutormin (Nizhny Tagil)

24 July 2015	Biolog-Novokubansk Progress (3)	0–1	SKA Rostov-on-Don (3)	Novokubansky
		Match Protocol (in Russian)	Marenich 73'	Stadium: Stadion Biolog; Attendance: 300; Referee: Aleksandr Gurenko (Astrakhan)

24 July 2015	FC Afips (3)	1–0	Chernomorets Novorossiysk (3)	Afipsky
	Artyom Maslevskiy 21'	Match Protocol (in Russian)		Stadium: Andrey Arena; Attendance: 700; Referee: Vitalii Ermakov (Krasnodar)

24 July 2015	Tambov (3)	2–0	Zvezda Ryazan (3)	Tambov
	Grigoryan 9'; Andreev 27'	Match Protocol (in Russian)		Stadium: Central Stadium; Attendance: 2000; Referee: Dmitrii Veselov (Moscow)

24 July 2015	Metallurg Lipetsk (3)	5–1	Chertanovo Moscow (3)	Lipetsk
	Ovchinnikov 25'; Maksim Bolshakov 66', 68', 77'; Akhvlediani 85'	Match Protocol (in Russian)	Kosyanchuk 58'	Stadium: Metallurg Stadium; Attendance: 1500; Referee: Oleg Koretskii (Ramenskoe)

24 July 2015	Neftekhimik Nizhnekamsk (3)	2–1	Volga Ulyanovsk (3)	Nizhnekamsk
	Yaroslavtsev 72'; Maleev 74'	Match Protocol (in Russian)	Nagovitsin 44'	Stadium: Neftekhimik Stadium; Attendance: 1100; Referee: Andrey Chulkin (Izhevsk)

24 July 2015	Shakhter Peshelan' (5)	1–1 (a.e.t.) (4–3 p)	Volga-Olimpiyets Nizhny Novgorod (3)	Peshelan'
	Vladimir Fedotov 39'	Match Protocol (in Russian)	Belyakov 68'	Stadium: Stadion Shakhtyor; Attendance: 450; Referee: Vladislav Rybakov (Ulyanovsk)
	Penalties
	Ilya Syomin (penalty scored); Vladimir Fedotov (penalty missed); Zagonenko (penalty scored); Kirill Kudryashov (penalty scored); Ilya Dodonov (penalty scored)		Belyakov (penalty scored); Nesterov (penalty missed); Vasilyev (penalty missed); Tkach (penalty scored); Nikolayev (penalty scored)

24 July 2015	FC Syzran-2003 (3)	0–1 (a.e.t.)	Lada-Togliatti (3)	Syzran
		Match Protocol (in Russian)	Churavtsev 119'	Stadium: Kristall Stadium; Attendance: 1900; Referee: Dimitrii Suhov (Nizhny Novgorod)

24 July 2015	Torpedo Moscow (3)	0–0 (a.e.t.) (2–3 p)	Dynamo Bryansk (3)	Moscow
		Match Protocol (in Russian)		Stadium: Stadion Torpedo im. Eduarda Strel'tsova; Attendance: 1500; Referee: Yuri Karpov (Petrozavodsk)
	Penalties
	Tyupikov (penalty missed); Andrei Shiryayev (penalty missed); Shumeyko (penalty scored); Savichev (penalty scored); Konstantin Pavlov (penalty missed)		Vladimir Syomin (penalty scored); Nikita Bondarev (penalty scored); Tomilin (penalty scored); Yefremenko (penalty missed)

24 July 2015	Torpedo Vladimir (3)	1–2	Domodedovo Moscow (3)	Vladimir
	Gatsko 5'	Match Protocol (in Russian)	Bolshakov 37'; Shestakov 64'	Stadium: Torpedo Stadium; Attendance: 800; Referee: Ivan Abrosimov (Saint Petersburg)

24 July 2015	Volga Tver (3)	1–0	Spartak Kostroma (3)	Tver
	Roshchin 17'	Match Protocol (in Russian)		Stadium: Khimik Stadium; Attendance: 600; Referee: Maksim Nasedin (Zheleznodorozhny)

24 July 2015	Avangard Kursk (3)	0–3	Lokomotiv Liski (3)	Kursk
		Match Protocol (in Russian)	Chernyshov 3', 66' (pen.); Sereda 14'	Stadium: Trudovye Rezervy Stadium; Attendance: 1100; Referee: Sergey Tikhonov (Moscow)

24 July 2015	Dynamo Stavropol (3)	0–0 (a.e.t.) (5–4 p)	Astrakhan (3)	Stavropol
		Match Protocol (in Russian)		Stadium: Dynamo Stadium; Attendance: 1700; Referee: Maksim Shutov (Novocherkassk)
	Penalties
	Dmitri Medvedev (penalty scored); Sergei Yartsev (penalty scored); Serdyukov (penalty scored); Magomedov (penalty scored); Chernyshev (penalty scored)		Zenin (penalty scored); Panfilov (penalty missed); Ururu (penalty scored); Golubev (penalty scored); Viktor Garayev (penalty scored)

24 July 2015	Pskov-747 (3)	2–0	Karelia Petrozavodsk (3)	Pskov
	Shishaev 11'; Pochipov 61'	Match Protocol (in Russian)		Stadium: Sport Complex 747; Attendance: 800; Referee: Aleksandr Dobrolyubov (Saint Petersburg)

24 July 2015	FC Chelyabinsk (3)	0–1	Nosta Novotroitsk (3)	Chelyabinsk
		Match Protocol (in Russian)	Olifirenko 62'	Stadium: Central Stadium; Attendance: 1200; Referee: Anton Batalov (Izhevsk)

24 July 2015	Spartak Nalchik (3)	2–2 (8–7 p)	Angusht Nazran (3)	Nalchik
	Kramarenko 37'; Guguyev 90+4'	Match Protocol (in Russian)	Prus 10'; A. Konov 18'	Stadium: Republican stadium Spartak; Attendance: 700; Referee: Dmitrii Strlitsov (Rostov-on-Don)
	Penalties
	Bazhev (penalty scored); Guguyev (penalty missed); Gurfov (penalty missed); Drozdov (penalty scored); Dashayev (penalty scored); Kuznetsov (penalty scored); Akhriyev (penalty scored); Karkayev (penalty scored); Teberdiyev (penalty missed); Antipov (penalty scored); Bazhev (penalty scored)		Barakhoyev (penalty missed); Kishev (penalty scored); Albogochiyev (penalty missed); Tsuroyev (penalty scored); Sharov (penalty scored); Akhkilgov (penalty scored); Adam Kottoyev (penalty scored); A. Aushev (penalty scored); Balayev (penalty missed); Khamkhoyev (penalty scored); Barakhoyev (penalty missed)

26 July 2015	Irtysh Omsk (3)	1–2 (a.e.t.)	Dynamo Barnaul (3)	Omsk
	Osipenko 15'	Match Protocol (in Russian)	Shcherbakov 26'; Starkov 101'	Stadium: Krasnaya Zvezda Stadium; Attendance: 1500; Referee: Artem Petrenko (Novosibirsk)

26 July 2015	FC Belogorsk (4)	1–0	Yakutiya Yakutsk (3)	Belogorsk
	Murtaev 72'	Match Protocol (in Russian)		Stadium: Lokomotiv Stadium; Attendance: 1700; Referee: Konstantin Molchanov (Chita)

26 July 2015	Restavratsiya Krasnoyarsk (4)	1–2	FC Novokuznetsk (3)	Krasnoyarsk
	Vladislav Fokin 40'	Match Protocol (in Russian)	Shpedt 64'; Sabanov 83' (pen.)	Stadium: Football Arena Yenisey; Attendance: 1000; Referee: Yevgheni Kozlov (Novosibirsk)

31 July 2015	Dolgiye Prudy (3)	1–5	FC Khimki (3)	Dolgoprudny
	Malaniya 49' (pen.)	Match Protocol (in Russian)	Rodionov 15'; Kazaev 18'; Gashchenkov 34'; Markosov 81'; Kuzmichev 82'	Stadium: Stadion Salyut; Attendance: 700; Referee: Maksim Perezva (Ramenskoye)

== Third round ==
These matches were played on 6, 7 and 8 August 2015

6 August 2015	Smena Komsomolsk-na-Amure (3)	0–2	Sakhalin Yuzhno-Sakhalinsk (3)	Komsomolsk-on-Amur
		Match Protocol (in Russian)	Mikhalyov 5'; Kolomyts 32'	Stadium: Avangard Stadium; Attendance: 2100; Referee: Andrey Fisenko (Vladivostok)

6 August 2015	Chita (3)	1–1 (a.e.t.) (1–4 p)	Belogorsk (4)	Chita
	Kuleshov 30'	Match Protocol (in Russian)	Filippov 52'	Stadium: Lokomotiv Stadium; Attendance: 2200; Referee: Igor Baranov (Krasnoyarsk)
	Penalties
	Dudkin (penalty missed); Budyalov (penalty scored); Ryabovanov (penalty missed)		Murtayev (penalty scored); Mikheyev (penalty scored); Igor Kuts (penalty scored); Chernyavskiy (penalty scored)

6 August 2015	Dynamo Barnaul (3)	4–1	FC Novokuznetsk (3)	Barnaul
	Starkov 27', 53'; Nikita Kazantsev 47', 81'	Match Protocol (in Russian)	Andreyev 24'	Stadium: Dynamo Stadium; Attendance: 5320; Referee: Evgeny Kozlov (Novosibirsk)

7 August 2015	Zenit-Izhevsk (3)	3–1	Neftekhimik Nizhnekamsk (3)	Izhevsk
	Simanov 82'; Malakhovskiy 87'; Safin 90+' (pen.)	Match Protocol (in Russian)	Sekretov 39'	Stadium: Stadion Central'nyj Zenit; Attendance: 2000; Referee: Evgeny Bulanov (Saransk)

7 August 2015	Khimik Dzerzhinsk (3)	0–1	Shakhter Peshelan' (5)	Dzerzhinsk
		Match Protocol (in Russian)	Zagonenko 10'	Stadium: Khimik Stadium; Attendance: 750; Referee: Aleksandr Ksenofontov (Stupino)

7 August 2015	Lada-Togliatti (3)	0–2	Nosta Novotroitsk (3)	Togliatti
		Match Protocol (in Russian)	Sorokin 44'; Pavel Galyukshev 51'	Stadium: Torpedo Stadium; Attendance: 1850; Referee: Sergey Ceban (Moscow)

7 August 2015	Lokomotiv Liski (3)	1–3	Tambov (3)	Liski
	Bogatyrev 38' (pen.)	Match Protocol (in Russian)	Grigoryan 23'; Mikhalev 40'; Spitsyn 42'	Stadium: Lokomotiv Stadium; Attendance: 1000; Referee: Aleksey Amelin (Tula)

7 August 2015	Dynamo Bryansk (3)	0–1	Metallurg Lipetsk (3)	Bryansk
		Match Protocol (in Russian)	Maksim Bolshakov 37'	Stadium: Dynamo Stadium; Attendance: 2500; Referee: Dmitrii Smirnov (Moscow)

8 August 2015	SKA Rostov-on-Don (3)	3–0	Afips Afipsky (3)	Afipsky
	Marenich 6'; Gevorkyan 22' (pen.); Podbeltsev 65'	Match Protocol (in Russian)		Stadium: Andrey Arena; Attendance: 380; Referee: Ilya Trishcin (Balashikha)

8 August 2015	Dynamo Stavropol (3)	0–3	Spartak Nalchik (3)	Nalchik
		Match Protocol (in Russian)	Guguyev 16'; Bazhev 24', 72' (pen.)	Stadium: Spartak Stadium; Attendance: 3000; Referee: Yuri Sotnikov (Novorossiysk)

8 August 2015	Volga Tver (3)	1–1 (4–3 p)	Pskov-747 (3)	Tver
	Korovushkin 90'	Match Protocol (in Russian)	Aleynikov 86' (pen.)	Stadium: Khimik Stadium; Attendance: 2100; Referee: Ivan Sidenkov (Saint Petersburg)
	Penalties
	Korovushkin (penalty scored); Urkhov (penalty missed); Alborov (penalty scored); Nastusenko (penalty missed); Sergeyev (penalty scored); Lobanov (penalty scored)		Aleynikov (penalty missed); Kurbanov (penalty missed); Pochipov (penalty scored); Proshin (penalty scored); Turchin (penalty scored); Sakadeyev (penalty missed)

8 August 2015	Domodedovo Moscow (3)	1–1 (6–7 p)	FC Khimki (3)	Domodedovo
	Bolshakov 22'	Match Protocol (in Russian)	Gashchenkov 38'	Stadium: Avangard Stadium; Attendance: 1000; Referee: Stanislav Isayev (Velikiye Luki)
	Penalties
	Gavryuk (penalty scored); Popov (penalty scored); Bolshakov (penalty scored); Yashin (penalty scored); Sapronov (penalty scored); Korotkov (penalty scored); Shestakov (penalty missed)		Markosov (penalty scored); Gashchenkov (penalty scored); Lapin (penalty scored); Shirokov (penalty scored); Chernyshov (penalty scored); Tyunin (penalty scored); Shumskikh (penalty scored)

=== Additional games ===
14 August 2015	Dynamo Bryansk (3)	0–1	Lokomotiv Liski (3)	Bryansk
		Match Protocol (in Russian)	Fateev 52'	Stadium: Dynamo Stadium; Attendance: 2000; Referee: Maksim Perezva (Ramenskoye)

15 August 2015	Pskov-747 (3)	2–1	FC Domodedovo Moscow (3)	Pskov
	Proshin 27'; Pochipov 71'	Match Protocol (in Russian)	Kudinov 6'	Stadium: Sportivnyj Kompleks 747 (Lokomotiv); Attendance: 800; Referee: Konstantin Avereanov (Saint Petersburg)

== Fourth round ==
Teams from the FNL enter the competition at this round. The matches were played on 26 and 27 August and 11 September 2015.

26 August 2015	Sakhalin Yuzhno-Sakhalinsk (3)	1–0	Luch-Energiya Vladivostok (2)	Nakhodka
	Gagloev 8' (pen.)	Match Protocol (in Russian)		Stadium: Vodnik Stadium; Attendance: 600; Referee: Anton Anola (Blagoveshchensk)

26 August 2015	Dynamo Barnaul (3)	1–3	Yenisey Krasnoyarsk (2)	Barnaul
	Dmitri Sergeyev 72'	Match Protocol (in Russian)	Klimov 4'; Khrushchyov 60'; Aliyev 66'	Stadium: Dynamo Stadium; Attendance: 6350; Referee: Roman Galinov (Ulan-Ude)

26 August 2015	Nosta Novotroitsk (3)	2–1 (a.e.t.)	Sibir Novosibirsk (2)	Novotroitsk
	Karpukhin 66', 102'	Match Protocol (in Russian)	Korzhunov 33'	Stadium: Metallurg Stadium; Attendance: 1000; Referee: Aleksey Avtuhovitch (Chelyabinsk)

26 August 2015	Tambov (3)	1–0	Arsenal Tula (2)	Tambov
	Andreyev 52'	Match Protocol (in Russian)		Stadium: Central Stadium; Attendance: 5500; Referee: Pavel Shadihanov (Moscow)

26 August 2015	Volga Tver (3)	1–0	Baltika Kaliningrad (2)	Tver
	Nastusenko 8'	Match Protocol (in Russian)		Stadium: Khimik Stadium; Attendance: 4000; Referee: Maksim Cernetsov (Smolensk)

26 August 2015	Zenit-Izhevsk (3)	3–0	KAMAZ Naberezhnye Chelny (2)	Izhevsk
	Ushakov 15'; Simanov 65', 80'	Match Protocol (in Russian)		Stadium: Central Stadium Zenit; Attendance: 2000; Referee: Aleksandr Borisov (Samara)

26 August 2015	Lokomotiv Liski (3)	3–1	Fakel Voronezh (2)	Liski
	Chernyshov 8', 53'; Igor Fateyev 76'	Match Protocol (in Russian)	Svezhov 73'	Stadium: Lokomotiv Stadium; Attendance: 2400; Referee: Artem Tchisteakov (Azov)

26 August 2015	Spartak Nalchik (3)	2–2 (5–4 p)	Volgar Astrakhan (2)	Nalchik
	Guguev 34'; Kuznetsov 56'	Match Protocol (in Russian)	Bolov 18'; Bolonin 23'	Stadium: Spartak Stadium; Attendance: 2300; Referee: Pavel Kukuyan (Sochi)
	Penalties
	Karkayev (penalty scored); Akhriyev (penalty scored); Bogatyryov (penalty scored); Dashayev (penalty scored); Guguev (penalty scored)		Zhabkin (penalty scored); Pavlishin (penalty scored); Bolonin (penalty scored); Ivanov (penalty missed); Sutormin (penalty scored)

26 August 2015	Sokol Saratov (3)	1–0	Gazovik Orenburg (2)	Saratov
	Burchenko 47'	Match Protocol (in Russian)		Stadium: Lokomotiv Stadium; Attendance: 5700; Referee: Aleksey Suhoy (Lyubertsy)

27 August 2015	Belogorsk (4)	0–4	SKA-Energiya Khabarovsk (2)	Belogorsk
		Match Protocol (in Russian)	Udaly 67'; Nikiforov 73'; Imedashvili 78'; Karmazinenko 90+'	Stadium: Stadion Lokomotiv; Attendance: 2500; Referee: Andrey Fisenko (Vladivostok)

27 August 2015	Baikal Irkutsk (3)	3–2	Tom Tomsk (2)	Irkutsk
	Avagimyan 25'; Mayboroda 80'; Yushchuk 90+'	Match Protocol (in Russian)	K. Pogrebnyak 18'; Nemov 82'	Stadium: Trud Stadium; Attendance: 3500; Referee: Timur Arslanbekov (Moscow)

27 August 2015	SKA Rostov-on-Don (3)	0–2	Torpedo Armavir (2)	Bataysk
		Match Protocol (in Russian)	Geperidze 4'; Bougouhi 7'	Stadium: Lokomotiv Stadium; Attendance: 1600; Referee: Evgeny Turbin (Moscow)

27 August 2015	Metallurg Lipetsk (3)	0–2	Volga Nizhny Novgorod (2)	Lipetsk
		Match Protocol (in Russian)	Kukharchuk 21'; Lukyanov 65'	Stadium: Metallurg Stadium; Attendance: 5000; Referee: Yevgeni Kukulyak (Kaluga)

27 August 2015	Pskov-747 (3)	0–1	FC Tosno (2)	Pskov
		Match Protocol (in Russian)	Komkov 42'	Stadium: Sport Complex 747; Attendance: 1500; Referee: Igor Panin (Dmitrov)

27 August 2015	FC Khimki (3)	3–0	FC Tyumen (2)	Khimki
	Markosov 8'; Dvornikov 32'; Chernyshov 69'	Match Protocol (in Russian)		Stadium: Rodina Stadium; Attendance: 850; Referee: Roman Chernov (Moscow)

11 September 2015	Shakhter Peshelan' (5)	2–3 (a.e.t.)	Shinnik Yaroslavl (2)	Dzerzhinsk
	Zabolotnyi 31', 49'	(in Russian)	Myazin 11', 72' (pen.); Ayrapetyan 119'	Stadium: Khimik Stadium; Attendance: 600; Referee: Stanislav Vasilyev (Izhevk)

== Round of 32 ==
Teams from the Premier League enter the competition at this round. The matches were played on 23 and 24 September 2015.

23 September 2015	Sakhalin Yuzhno-Sakhalinsk (3)	0–4	Ufa	Yuzhno-Sakhalinsk
19:00 VLA (UTC+10)			Zaseyev 18'; Krotov 25', 73'; Fomin 90+2'	Stadium: Spartak Stadium

23 September 2015	Baikal Irkutsk (3)	1–2 (a.e.t.)	CSKA Moscow	Irkutsk
18:30 IRKST (UTC+8)	Mashnev 32'		Cauņa 78'; Panchenko 109'	Stadium: Trud Stadium

23 September 2015	Tambov (3)	2–3	Krylia Sovetov	Tambov
15:00 MSK (UTC+3)	O. Chernyshov 4'; A. Chasovskikh 45+3'		Chochiyev 15'; Rodić 57'; Tsallagov 85'	Stadium: Central Stadium

23 September 2015	Volga Tver (3)	0–3 (a.e.t.)	Zenit Saint Petersburg	Tver
15:00 MSK (UTC+3)			Tkachuk 94', 106', 112'	Stadium: Khimik Stadium

23 September 2015	Torpedo Armavir (2)	0–1	Lokomotiv Moscow	Armavir
15:30 MSK (UTC+3)			Škuletić 78'	Stadium: Yunost Stadium

23 September 2015	Nosta Novotroitsk (3)	0–2	Terek Grozny	Novotroitsk
18:00 YEKT (UTC+5)			Kadyrov 63'; Kanu 82'	Stadium: Metallurg Stadium

23 September 2015	Volga Nizhny Novgorod (2)	0–7	Spartak Moscow	Nizhny Novgorod
18:00 MSK (UTC+3)			Zé Luís 6', 26'; Popov 21', 45+1'; Tasci 51'; Zotov 61'; Özbiliz 70'	Stadium: Lokomotiv Stadium

23 September 2015	Shinnik Yaroslavl (2)	1–2	Kuban Krasnodar	Yaroslavl
18:30 MSK (UTC+3)	Plătică 90'		Nurisov 50'; Volchkov 85'	Stadium: Shinnik Stadium

23 September 2015	Sokol Saratov (3)	2–4	Anzhi Makhachkala	Saratov
19:00 MSK (UTC+3)	Stolyarenko 17'; Korotayev 89'		Boli 36'; Leonardo 61'; Almeida 74', 90+2'	Stadium: Lokomotiv Stadium

24 September 2015	SKA-Energiya Khabarovsk (2)	2–0	Rubin Kazan	Khabarovsk
19:00 VLA (UTC+10)	Popov 3'; Bazelyuk 90+1'			Stadium: Lenin Stadium

24 September 2015	Yenisey Krasnoyarsk (2)	1–2	Ural	Krasnoyarsk
19:00 KRAT (UTC+7)	Lescano 16' (pen.)		Stavpets 48'; Gogniyev 89'	Stadium: Central Stadium

24 September 2015	Zenit-Izhevsk (3)	0–1	Krasnodar	Izhevsk
16:00 SAMT (UTC+4)			Smolov 86'	Stadium: Central Stadium Zenit

24 September 2015	Lokomotiv Liski (3)	0–2	Dynamo Moscow	Liski
18:00 MSK (UTC+3)			Tashayev 35'; Kokorin 50'	Stadium: Lokomotiv Stadium

24 September 2015	Spartak Nalchik (3)	0–2	Amkar Perm	Nalchik
18:30 MSK (UTC+3)			Balanovich 20', 60'	Stadium: Spartak Stadium; Attendance: 4,500; Referee: Roman Chernov

24 September 2015	Tosno (2)	1–0 (a.e.t.)	Rostov	Tikhvin
19:00 MSK (UTC+3)	Mikhalyov 99'			Stadium: Stadion Kirovets

24 September 2015	Khimki (3)	1–0	Mordovia Saransk	Khimki
19:00 MSK (UTC+3)	Chernyshov 47'			Stadium: Rodina Stadium

== Round of 16 ==
The matches were played on 28 and 29 October 2015.

28 October 2015	Ufa	1–0	SKA-Energiya Khabarovsk (2)	Ufa
18:00 YEKT (UTC+5)	Pourié 65'			Stadium: Neftyanik; Attendance: 3,450; Referee: Vladimir Seldyakov

28 October 2015	Terek Grozny	2–1 (a.e.t.)	Khimki (3)	Grozny
19:00 MSK (UTC+3)	Mitrishev 29', 97'		Dvornikov 69'	Stadium: Akhmat-Arena; Attendance: 14,700; Referee: Evgeny Turbin

28 October 2015	Zenit Saint Petersburg	5–0	Tosno (2)	Saint Petersburg
19:00 MSK (UTC+3)	Dzyuba 11', 39'; Witsel 18', 37'; Ryazantsev 44'			Stadium: Petrovsky Stadium; Attendance: 16,156; Referee: Vladislav Bezborodov

28 October 2015	CSKA Moscow	2–1	Ural	Khimki
19:30 MSK (UTC+3)	Panchenko 47'; Tošić 86'		Podberyozkin 78'	Stadium: Arena Khimki; Attendance: 3,000; Referee: Kirill Levnikov

28 October 2015	Kuban Krasnodar	1–0	Spartak Moscow	Krasnodar
20:30 MSK (UTC+3)	Melgarejo 34'			Stadium: Kuban Stadium; Attendance: 7,791; Referee: Sergei Ivanov

29 October 2015	Krylia Sovetov	0–1	Dynamo Moscow	Samara
18:00 SAMT (UTC+4)			Tashayev 87'	Stadium: Metallurg; Attendance: 4,951; Referee: Aleksandr Yegorov

29 October 2015	Lokomotiv Moscow	0–1	Amkar Perm	Moscow
19:00 MSK (UTC+3)			Dzhikiya 57'	Stadium: Lokomotiv Stadium; Attendance: 8,185; Referee: Sergei Kulikov

29 October 2015	Krasnodar	3–1	Anzhi Makhachkala	Krasnodar
19:00 MSK (UTC+3)	Mamayev 20'; Tagirbekov 25' (o.g.); Joãozinho 90+1'		Yeshchenko 71'	Stadium: Kuban Stadium; Attendance: 4,045; Referee: Aleksei Matyunin

== Quarter-finals ==
The matches were played from 28 February to 2 March 2016.

28 February 2016	Zenit Saint Petersburg	1–0 (a.e.t.)	Kuban Krasnodar	Saint Petersburg
20:00 MSK (UTC+3)	Maurício 104'			Stadium: Petrovsky Stadium; Attendance: 17646; Referee: Aleksei Eskov (Moscow)

1 March 2016	Ufa	0–2	CSKA Moscow	Ufa
19:00 YEKT (UTC+5)			Shirokov 57'; Musa 75'	Stadium: Neftyanik; Attendance: 9850; Referee: Sergey Lapochkin (St. Petersburg)

1 March 2016	Krasnodar	1–0 (a.e.t.)	Terek Grozny	Krasnodar
19:15 MSK (UTC+3)	Granqvist 116'			Stadium: Kuban Stadium; Attendance: 8750; Referee: Kirill Levnikov (St. Petersburg)

2 March 2016	Amkar Perm	3–1	Dynamo Moscow	Perm
19:00 YEKT (UTC+5)	Prudnikov 26'; Zaytsev 41'; Shavayev 90+3' (pen.)		Drahun 87'	Stadium: Zvezda Stadium; Attendance: 7300; Referee: Vladimir Moskalyov (Voronezh)

== Semi-finals ==
The matches were played on 20 April 2016.

20 April 2016	Amkar Perm	1–1 (a.e.t.) (3–4 p)	Zenit Saint Petersburg	Perm
19:00 YEKT (UTC+5)	Idowu 19'	RFPL report	García 41'	Stadium: Zvezda Stadium; Attendance: 15,660; Referee: Igor Fedotov
	Penalties
	Peev (penalty missed); Shavayev (penalty missed); Ogude (penalty scored); Selikhov (penalty scored); Prudnikov (penalty scored); Zaytsev (penalty missed)		(penalty scored) Hulk; (penalty missed) Garay; (penalty missed) Dzyuba; (penalty scored) Witsel; (penalty scored) Criscito; (penalty scored) García

20 April 2016	CSKA Moscow	3–1	Krasnodar	Khimki
19:00 MSK (UTC+3)	Golovin 35', 40'; Dzagoev 46'	RFPL Report	Sigurðsson 73'	Stadium: Arena Khimki; Attendance: 4,587; Referee: Vitali Meshkov

== Final ==
2 May 2016
16:00 MSK (UTC+3)

CSKA Moscow	1−4	Zenit Saint Petersburg
Olanare 36'	RPFL Report	Hulk 34' (pen.), 63' (pen.); Kokorin 55'; Yusupov 69'

Kazan Arena, Kazan
Attendance: 36,500
Referee: Alexander Yegorov
