= List of Russian football transfers summer 2011 =

This is a list of Russian football transfers in the summer transfer window 2011 by club. Only clubs of the 2011–12 Russian Premier League are included.

== Russian Premier League 2011–12 ==
=== Amkar Perm ===
In: Note: Flags indicate national team as defined under FIFA eligibility rules; some limited exceptions apply. Players may hold more than one non-FIFA nationality.

No.	Pos.	Nation	Player
6	MF	SRB	Marko Blažić (from (Slovakia) Ružomberok)
17	MF	EST	Konstantin Vassiljev (from (Slovenia) Luka Koper)
25	DF	UKR	Serhiy Garashchenkov (from (Ukraine) Shakhtar Donetsk)
29	DF	MNE	Nemanja Mijušković (on loan from Dynamo Moscow)
35	GK	RUS	Andrei Danilov
40	MF	RUS	Igor Paderin (from Kuban Krasnodar)
48	MF	RUS	Nikita Glukhikh
60	MF	RUS	Artur Valikayev (on loan from Spartak Moscow)
61	GK	RUS	Mikhail Oparin
70	MF	RUS	Dmitri Kozlov
77	DF	GEO	Zourab Tsiskaridze (from (Canada) Montreal Impact)
83	DF	RUS	Georgi Dzhioyev (from Zhemchuzhina-Sochi)

Out: Note: Flags indicate national team as defined under FIFA eligibility rules; some limited exceptions apply. Players may hold more than one non-FIFA nationality.

No.	Pos.	Nation	Player
9	FW	MKD	Stevica Ristić (to (South Korea) Suwon Bluewings)
16	DF	BIH	Samir Merzić (to (Bosnia and Herzegovina) Velež Mostar)
22	DF	RUS	Vyacheslav Kalashnikov (to Dynamo Bryansk)
55	GK	RUS	Dmitri Yershov (to Istra)
58	FW	RUS	Ilya Kolpakov (released)

=== Anzhi Makhachkala ===
In: Note: Flags indicate national team as defined under FIFA eligibility rules; some limited exceptions apply. Players may hold more than one non-FIFA nationality.

No.	Pos.	Nation	Player
20	MF	MAR	Mehdi Carcela-Gonzalez (from (Belgium) Standard Liège)
22	MF	HUN	Balázs Dzsudzsák (from (Netherlands) PSV)
29	MF	RUS	Seyt-Daut Garakoyev
31	GK	RUS	Yevgeny Pomazan (from CSKA Moscow)
81	DF	RUS	Yuri Zhirkov (from (England) Chelsea)
89	FW	RUS	Aleksandr Prudnikov (from Spartak Moscow, previously on loan)
93	MF	RUS	Islam Suleymanov
94	FW	RUS	Islamnur Abdulavov (from (Ukraine) Dynamo Kyiv)
97	GK	RUS	Islamkhan Gadzhiyasulov
99	FW	CMR	Samuel Eto'o (from (Italy) Internazionale)
—	GK	RUS	Vladimir Gabulov (from Dynamo Moscow)
—	DF	RUS	Yevgeni Gapon (from Shinnik Yaroslavl)
—	DF	RUS	Arseniy Logashov (from Khimki)
—	MF	RUS	Dmitri Ivanov (end of loan to Dagdizel Kaspiysk)
—	MF	RUS	Mikhail Pometsko (end of loan to Dagdizel Kaspiysk)

Out: Note: Flags indicate national team as defined under FIFA eligibility rules; some limited exceptions apply. Players may hold more than one non-FIFA nationality.

No.	Pos.	Nation	Player
15	FW	GEO	Irakli Klimiashvili (on loan to (Uzbekistan) Pakhtakor Tashkent)
20	MF	RUS	Mikhail Bakayev (to Alania Vladikavkaz)
22	FW	UKR	Myroslav Slavov (on loan to (Ukraine) Metalurh Donetsk)
31	FW	TOG	Arafat Djako (on loan to (Turkey) Gaziantepspor)
55	DF	RUS	Badavi Guseynov (on loan to (Azerbaijan) Sumgayit City F.C.)
83	DF	LAT	Oskars Kļava (on loan to Khimki)
—	GK	RUS	Vladimir Gabulov (on loan to CSKA Moscow)
—	DF	RUS	Yevgeni Gapon (on loan to Fakel Voronezh)
—	DF	RUS	Arseniy Logashov (on loan to Fakel Voronezh)
—	MF	GEO	Zurab Arziani (to Volga Nizhny Novgorod, previously on loan to (Georgia (country)) Dinamo Tbilisi)

=== CSKA Moscow ===
In: Note: Flags indicate national team as defined under FIFA eligibility rules; some limited exceptions apply. Players may hold more than one non-FIFA nationality.

No.	Pos.	Nation	Player
19	MF	LAT	Aleksandrs Cauņa (from (Latvia) Skonto, previously on loan)
20	FW	NIG	Ouwo Moussa Maazou (end of loan to (France) AS Monaco)
30	GK	RUS	Vladimir Gabulov (on loan from Anzhi Makhachkala)
53	DF	RUS	Andrei Semyonov (from Lokomotiv Moscow)
57	MF	RUS	Aleksandr Vasyukov (from Lokomotiv Moscow)
—	FW	RUS	Anton Zabolotny (end of loan to Ural)

Out: Note: Flags indicate national team as defined under FIFA eligibility rules; some limited exceptions apply. Players may hold more than one non-FIFA nationality.

No.	Pos.	Nation	Player
20	FW	NIG	Ouwo Moussa Maazou (on loan to (Belgium) Zulte Waregem)
44	MF	RUS	Marsel Safin (to Znamya Truda Orekhovo-Zuyevo)
54	DF	RUS	Stepan Ryabokon (to Rotor Volgograd)
—	GK	RUS	Artur Nigmatullin (on loan to Ural Sverdlovsk Oblast, previously on loan to Mordovia Saransk)
—	GK	RUS	Yevgeny Pomazan (to Anzhi Makhachkala, previously on loan to Spartak Nalchik)
—	MF	CZE	Luboš Kalouda (on loan to (Ukraine) Oleksandria, previously not registered)
—	FW	POL	Dawid Janczyk (on loan to (Ukraine) Oleksandria, previously on loan to (Poland) Korona Kielce)

=== Dynamo Moscow ===
In: Note: Flags indicate national team as defined under FIFA eligibility rules; some limited exceptions apply. Players may hold more than one non-FIFA nationality.

No.	Pos.	Nation	Player
4	DF	BLR	Igor Shitov (from (Belarus) BATE Borisov)
12	MF	BLR	Pavel Nyakhaychyk (from (Belarus) BATE Borisov)
16	GK	RUS	Yevgeni Frolov (from Mordovia Saransk)
17	MF	RUS	Alan Gatagov (from Lokomotiv Moscow)
33	DF	RUS	Vladimir Rykov (from KAMAZ Naberezhnye Chelny)
45	MF	UKR	Borys Taschy (from (Latvia) Olimps)
59	MF	RUS	Aleksandr Ilyin
65	MF	RUS	Kirill Zubkov (from Saturn-2 Moscow Oblast)
73	MF	RUS	Aleksandr Tashayev
74	MF	RUS	Anatoli Katrich
76	DF	RUS	Anton Ivanov
80	MF	SRB	Marko Jevtovic

Out: Note: Flags indicate national team as defined under FIFA eligibility rules; some limited exceptions apply. Players may hold more than one non-FIFA nationality.

No.	Pos.	Nation	Player
20	MF	ROU	Adrian Ropotan (on loan to Tom Tomsk)
30	GK	RUS	Vladimir Gabulov (to Anzhi Makhachkala)
50	DF	MNE	Nemanja Mijušković (on loan to Amkar Perm)
85	FW	KOR	Lee Min-Kyu (released)
86	MF	KOR	He Minen (released)
87	DF	RUS	Aleksandr Kuzminov (released)
98	DF	RUS	Soslan Takazov (to Alania Vladikavkaz)
—	DF	POL	Marcin Kowalczyk (to (Poland) Zagłębie Lubin, previously on loan to (Ukraine) Metalurh Donetsk)
—	MF	URU	Luis Aguiar (to (Portugal) Sporting, previously on loan to (Uruguay) Peñarol)

=== FC Krasnodar ===
In: Note: Flags indicate national team as defined under FIFA eligibility rules; some limited exceptions apply. Players may hold more than one non-FIFA nationality.

No.	Pos.	Nation	Player
7	FW	GEO	Otar Martsvaladze (from Volga Nizhny Novgorod)
13	DF	RUS	Fyodor Kudryashov (on loan from Spartak Moscow)
21	MF	RUS	Oleg Samsonov (from Krylia Sovetov Samara)
32	MF	RUS	Yevgeni Chernyshov (from Saturn-2 Moscow Oblast)
52	DF	RUS	Roman Saunin
54	MF	RUS	Ilya Petrov
56	DF	RUS	Sergei Khmelevskoy
59	MF	RUS	Kirill Morozov
71	MF	POR	Rui Miguel Rodrigues (from (Portugal) Vitória Guimarães)

Out: Note: Flags indicate national team as defined under FIFA eligibility rules; some limited exceptions apply. Players may hold more than one non-FIFA nationality.

No.	Pos.	Nation	Player
6	MF	RUS	Dmitri Michkov (to Shinnik Yaroslavl)
7	MF	RUS	Andrei Pazin (to Mordovia Saransk)
8	MF	RUS	Andrei Gorbanets (on loan to Mordovia Saransk)
21	MF	RUS	Mikhail Komkov (to Kuban Krasnodar)
27	MF	RUS	Ilya Mironov (to Saturn-2 Moscow Oblast)
28	MF	RUS	Roman Vorobyov (to Krylia Sovetov Samara)
29	MF	RUS	Artyom Beketov (to Dynamo Bryansk)
32	MF	RUS	Aleksei Maslennikov (released)
50	MF	RUS	Aleksei Ryabokon (to Rostov)
—	DF	MNE	Ivan Novović (to (Montenegro) Zeta, previously on loan)
—	FW	MNE	Ivan Knežević (to (Montenegro) Zeta, previously on loan)
—	FW	RUS	Denis Dorozhkin (to Torpedo Moscow, previously on loan to Chernomorets Novorossiysk)

=== Krylia Sovetov Samara ===
In: Note: Flags indicate national team as defined under FIFA eligibility rules; some limited exceptions apply. Players may hold more than one non-FIFA nationality.

No.	Pos.	Nation	Player
5	MF	SRB	Ognjen Koroman (from (Serbia) Red Star Belgrade)
18	FW	BLR	Sergei Kornilenko (from Zenit St. Petersburg)
23	FW	BUL	Dimitar Makriev (from (Israel) Ashdod)
25	MF	RUS	Roman Grigoryan (from Shinnik Yaroslavl)
31	GK	RUS	Aleksei Fyodorov
40	DF	RUS	Sergei Bozhin
41	FW	RUS	Vladimir Pestryachyov
52	DF	BUL	Viktor Genev (on loan from (Bulgaria) Slavia Sofia)
82	GK	BLR	Syarhey Vyeramko (from (Ukraine) Sevastopol)
84	MF	RUS	Roman Vorobyov (from Krasnodar)
90	FW	RUS	Khyzyr Appayev (from Druzhba Maykop)
91	MF	RUS	Pavel Yakovlev (on loan from Spartak Moscow)
98	MF	RUS	Sergei Petrov (from Zenit St. Petersburg)

Out: Note: Flags indicate national team as defined under FIFA eligibility rules; some limited exceptions apply. Players may hold more than one non-FIFA nationality.

No.	Pos.	Nation	Player
6	MF	RUS	Oleg Samsonov (to Krasnodar)
9	FW	RUS	Yevgeny Savin (to Tom Tomsk)
30	GK	RUS	Nikita Alekseyev (released)
32	MF	RUS	Aleksandr Yeliseyev (to Shinnik Yaroslavl)
37	MF	RUS	Yevgeni Frolov
49	MF	RUS	Nikolai Revnyak (released)
92	GK	ALG	Raïs M'Bolhi (on loan to (Bulgaria) CSKA Sofia)

=== Kuban Krasnodar ===
In: Note: Flags indicate national team as defined under FIFA eligibility rules; some limited exceptions apply. Players may hold more than one non-FIFA nationality.

No.	Pos.	Nation	Player
5	DF	RUS	Sergei Bendz (from Volga Nizhny Novgorod)
23	GK	RUS	Aleksandr Belenov (from Spartak Moscow)
27	DF	CIV	Igor Lolo (from (France) AS Monaco)
28	FW	SVK	František Kubík (from (Slovakia) AS Trenčín)
37	MF	RUS	Mikhail Komkov (from Krasnodar)
61	FW	RUS	Artyom Gevorkyan
62	DF	RUS	Sergei Khachaturyan
63	FW	RUS	Roman Dromenko
99	MF	RUS	Vladislav Ryzhkov (from Zhemchuzhina-Sochi)

Out: Note: Flags indicate national team as defined under FIFA eligibility rules; some limited exceptions apply. Players may hold more than one non-FIFA nationality.

No.	Pos.	Nation	Player
1	GK	MDA	Stanislav Namaşco (to Spartak Nalchik)
4	DF	URU	Mauricio Prieto (end of loan from (Uruguay) River Plate)
19	MF	BLR	Aleksey Skvernyuk (to Spartak Nalchik)
22	MF	RUS	Igor Paderin (to Amkar Perm)
32	DF	ANG	Francisco Zuela (on loan to (Greece) Atromitos)
42	DF	RUS	Sergei Gorelov (to Torpedo Armavir)
51	DF	RUS	Eduard Tatoyan (released)
77	MF	RUS	Tavakkyul Mamedov (to Torpedo Armavir)
87	MF	RUS	Ilya Maksimov (to Volga Nizhny Novgorod)

=== Lokomotiv Moscow ===
In: Note: Flags indicate national team as defined under FIFA eligibility rules; some limited exceptions apply. Players may hold more than one non-FIFA nationality.

No.	Pos.	Nation	Player
4	MF	ESP	Alberto Zapater (from (Portugal) Sporting)
13	FW	NGR	Victor Obinna (from (Italy) Internazionale)
22	DF	POR	Manuel da Costa (from (England) West Ham United)
25	FW	ECU	Felipe Caicedo (from (England) Manchester City)
29	DF	RUS	Igor Golban (from Zhemchuzhina-Sochi)
41	GK	RUS	Miroslav Lobantsev
44	DF	RUS	Mikhail Borisov
65	MF	RUS	Vyacheslav Podberyozkin
69	FW	RUS	Aleksei Turik
79	DF	RUS	Vitali Lystsov
82	MF	RUS	Igor Mendelev
88	DF	RUS	Dmitry Mikhaylenko
93	DF	RUS	Denis Baryshnikov
95	DF	RUS	Oleg Murachyov

Out: Note: Flags indicate national team as defined under FIFA eligibility rules; some limited exceptions apply. Players may hold more than one non-FIFA nationality.

No.	Pos.	Nation	Player
15	MF	GHA	Haminu Draman (to (France) Arles-Avignon)
19	FW	SEN	Baye Djiby Fall (on loan to (Denmark) OB)
23	DF	MNE	Marko Baša (to (France) Lille)
33	GK	BLR	Artem Gomelko (on loan to (Belarus) Torpedo-BelAZ Zhodino)
51	DF	RUS	Ruslan Nakhushev (on loan to Tom Tomsk)
53	DF	RUS	Andrei Semyonov (to CSKA Moscow)
59	MF	RUS	Aleksandr Vasyukov (to CSKA Moscow)
72	FW	RUS	Soslan Dzhioyev (to Alania Vladikavkaz)
81	MF	RUS	Soslan Gatagov (released)
84	MF	RUS	Daniil Lezgintsev (released)
99	MF	RUS	Alan Gatagov (to Dynamo Moscow)
—	DF	RUS	Maksim Belyayev (on loan to Torpedo Vladimir, previously on loan to Dynamo Bryansk)
—	DF	RUS	Igor Smolnikov (on loan to Rostov, previously on loan to Zhemchuzhina-Sochi)
—	MF	RUS	Semyon Fomin (on loan to Spartak Nalchik, previously on loan to Torpedo Vladimir)

=== FC Rostov ===
In: Note: Flags indicate national team as defined under FIFA eligibility rules; some limited exceptions apply. Players may hold more than one non-FIFA nationality.

No.	Pos.	Nation	Player
6	MF	ARG	Oscar Ahumada (from (Mexico) Veracruz)
7	MF	BRA	Élson (from (Germany) VfB Stuttgart)
12	GK	RUS	Ilya Madilov (from Istra)
16	DF	EST	Dmitri Kruglov (from (Azerbaijan) Inter Baku)
18	FW	CZE	Michal Papadopulos (from Zhemchuzhina-Sochi)
19	FW	ARG	Héctor Bracamonte (from Terek Grozny)
21	GK	CRO	Stipe Pletikosa (from Spartak Moscow)
28	DF	RUS	Igor Smolnikov (on loan from Lokomotiv Moscow)
44	FW	RUS	Andrei Arefyev
46	MF	RUS	Aleksei Ryabokon (from Krasnodar)
60	MF	RUS	Asker Nadzhafaliyev
72	DF	RUS	Valentin Filatov (free agent)
81	MF	ROU	Răzvan Cociş (from (Saudi Arabia) Al Nassr)
91	DF	RUS	Alan Bagayev (from FAYUR Beslan)
92	MF	RUS	Roman Yemelyanov (on loan from (Ukraine) Shakhtar Donetsk)

Out: Note: Flags indicate national team as defined under FIFA eligibility rules; some limited exceptions apply. Players may hold more than one non-FIFA nationality.

No.	Pos.	Nation	Player
1	GK	CZE	Martin Lejsal (released)
25	FW	RUS	Aleksei Sugak (on loan to (Belarus) Neman Grodno)

=== Rubin Kazan ===
In: Note: Flags indicate national team as defined under FIFA eligibility rules; some limited exceptions apply. Players may hold more than one non-FIFA nationality.

No.	Pos.	Nation	Player
5	FW	NGR	Obafemi Martins (end of loan to (England) Birmingham City)
6	MF	NGR	Michael Tukura (on loan from (Latvia) Ventspils)
18	FW	PAR	Nelson Valdez (from (Spain) Hércules)
20	MF	FIN	Alexei Eremenko (from (Ukraine) Metalist Kharkiv)
23	MF	FIN	Roman Eremenko (from (Ukraine) Dynamo Kyiv)
31	GK	RUS	Aleksei Berezin (from Rubin-2 Kazan)
33	FW	RUS	Igor Portnyagin (end of loan to Spartak Nalchik)
64	MF	GEO	Giorgi Chelebadze (from Fakel Voronezh)

Out: Note: Flags indicate national team as defined under FIFA eligibility rules; some limited exceptions apply. Players may hold more than one non-FIFA nationality.

No.	Pos.	Nation	Player
33	FW	RUS	Igor Portnyagin (on loan to Spartak Nalchik)
56	MF	RUS	Ruslan Makhmutov (to Neftekhimik Nizhnekamsk)
79	GK	RUS	Yuri Nesterenko (released)
—	DF	ESP	Jordi (on loan to (Spain) Rayo Vallecano, previously on loan to (Spain) Real Valladolid)
—	FW	UZB	Bahodir Nasimov (to (Azerbaijan) Neftchi Baku, previously on loan)

=== Spartak Moscow ===
In: Note: Flags indicate national team as defined under FIFA eligibility rules; some limited exceptions apply. Players may hold more than one non-FIFA nationality.

No.	Pos.	Nation	Player
16	MF	NED	Demy de Zeeuw (from (Netherlands) Ajax)
27	MF	RUS	Aleksandr Zotov (end of loan to Zhemchuzhina-Sochi)
29	FW	NGR	Emmanuel Emenike (from (Turkey) Fenerbahçe)
32	GK	RUS	Artyom Rebrov (from Shinnik Yaroslavl)
35	GK	RUS	Ivan Komissarov (end of loan to Tom Tomsk)
59	DF	RUS	Aleksandr Stepanov

Out: Note: Flags indicate national team as defined under FIFA eligibility rules; some limited exceptions apply. Players may hold more than one non-FIFA nationality.

No.	Pos.	Nation	Player
7	MF	BRA	Ibson (to (Brazil) Santos)
12	MF	BRA	Alex (to (Brazil) Corinthians)
13	DF	RUS	Fyodor Kudryashov (on loan to Krasnodar)
14	MF	RUS	Pavel Yakovlev (on loan to Krylia Sovetov Samara)
20	MF	RUS	Artur Valikayev (on loan to Amkar Perm)
33	GK	RUS	Aleksandr Belenov (to Kuban Krasnodar)
70	MF	RUS	Artemi Maleyev (released)
—	GK	CRO	Stipe Pletikosa (to (Russia) Rostov, previously on loan to (England) Tottenham Hotspur)
—	DF	GER	Malik Fathi (to (Germany) 1. FSV Mainz 05, previously on loan)
—	FW	RUS	Aleksandr Prudnikov (to Anzhi Makhachkala, previously on loan)

=== Spartak Nalchik ===
In: Note: Flags indicate national team as defined under FIFA eligibility rules; some limited exceptions apply. Players may hold more than one non-FIFA nationality.

No.	Pos.	Nation	Player
15	FW	RUS	Igor Portnyagin (on loan from Rubin Kazan)
16	DF	RUS	Astemir Sheriyev (free agent)
18	MF	BLR	Aleksey Skvernyuk (from Kuban Krasnodar)
22	MF	RUS	Gudzha Rukhaia (from Zhemchuzhina-Sochi)
27	GK	MDA	Stanislav Namaşco (from Kuban Krasnodar)
32	MF	RUS	Semyon Fomin (on loan from Lokomotiv Moscow)
35	DF	RUS	Aleksei Aravin (from Volga Nizhny Novgorod)
39	FW	ISL	Hannes Sigurðsson (from (Iceland) FH)
51	MF	RUS	Azamat Gurfov
54	FW	RUS	Islam Tlupov
56	FW	RUS	Khasan Bayev
58	MF	RUS	Artur Kochesokov

Out: Note: Flags indicate national team as defined under FIFA eligibility rules; some limited exceptions apply. Players may hold more than one non-FIFA nationality.

No.	Pos.	Nation	Player
10	MF	RUS	Nikita Malyarov (to Volga Nizhny Novgorod)
15	FW	RUS	Igor Portnyagin (end of loan from Rubin Kazan)
23	GK	RUS	Anton Antipov (to Mashuk-KMV Pyatigorsk)
33	GK	RUS	Yevgeny Pomazan (end of loan from CSKA Moscow)

=== Terek Grozny ===
In: Note: Flags indicate national team as defined under FIFA eligibility rules; some limited exceptions apply. Players may hold more than one non-FIFA nationality.

No.	Pos.	Nation	Player
26	FW	BRA	Ewerthon (from (Brazil) Palmeiras)
52	DF	CZE	Martin Jiránek (from (England) Birmingham City)
49	MF	RUS	Salakh Barzukayev
59	MF	RUS	Ruslan Kantayev
79	DF	RUS	Shamil Maltsagov
94	FW	RUS	Makhammad Selimsultanov
97	DF	RUS	Sheykh-Magomed Tagirov
99	MF	BEL	Jonathan Legear (from (Belgium) Anderlecht)

Out: Note: Flags indicate national team as defined under FIFA eligibility rules; some limited exceptions apply. Players may hold more than one non-FIFA nationality.

No.	Pos.	Nation	Player
19	FW	ARG	Héctor Bracamonte (to Rostov)
33	DF	RUS	Ismail Ediyev (on loan to Fakel Voronezh)

=== Tom Tomsk ===
In: Note: Flags indicate national team as defined under FIFA eligibility rules; some limited exceptions apply. Players may hold more than one non-FIFA nationality.

No.	Pos.	Nation	Player
9	MF	RUS	Denis Laktionov (ended retirement, previously coach at the club)
10	FW	RUS	Yevgeny Savin (from Krylia Sovetov Samara)
15	DF	RUS	Ruslan Nakhushev (on loan from Lokomotiv Moscow)
21	MF	RUS	Denis Boyarintsev (from Zhemchuzhina-Sochi)
22	DF	ROU	Ovidiu Dănănae (from (Romania) Universitatea Craiova)
61	GK	RUS	Daniil Gavilovskiy (from Dynamo Barnaul)
86	MF	ROU	Adrian Ropotan (on loan from Dynamo Moscow)
90	GK	RUS	Mikhail Filippov (from Saturn-2 Moscow Oblast)

Out: Note: Flags indicate national team as defined under FIFA eligibility rules; some limited exceptions apply. Players may hold more than one non-FIFA nationality.

No.	Pos.	Nation	Player
11	MF	UKR	Kyrylo Kovalchuk (on loan to (Ukraine) Chornomorets Odesa)
14	MF	RUS	Anton Kozlov (to Baltika Kaliningrad)
18	DF	RUS	Vladislav Khatazhyonkov (to Sibir Novosibirsk)
88	GK	RUS	Ivan Komissarov (end of loan from Spartak Moscow)

=== Volga Nizhny Novgorod ===
In: Note: Flags indicate national team as defined under FIFA eligibility rules; some limited exceptions apply. Players may hold more than one non-FIFA nationality.

No.	Pos.	Nation	Player
5	MF	GEO	Zurab Arziani (from Anzhi Makhachkala)
6	MF	RUS	Nikita Malyarov (from Spartak Nalchik)
10	MF	ROU	János Székely (from (Romania) Steaua București)
12	DF	ISR	Dani Bondar (from (Israel) Hapoel Tel Aviv)
27	MF	MDA	Mihail Paseciniuc (from (Moldova) Olimpia)
34	MF	RUS	Yevgeni Degtyaryov
40	DF	RUS	Bogdan Belonogov
50	DF	RUS	Andrey Eshchenko (from (Ukraine) Dynamo Kyiv)
70	FW	AZE	Vagif Javadov (from (Netherlands) Twente)
81	GK	RUS	Fyodor Osin
87	MF	RUS	Ilya Maksimov (from Kuban Krasnodar)}
95	MF	RUS	Ivan Maksimov
98	FW	RUS	Dmitri Karasyov

Out: Note: Flags indicate national team as defined under FIFA eligibility rules; some limited exceptions apply. Players may hold more than one non-FIFA nationality.

No.	Pos.	Nation	Player
3	DF	BRA	Leilton (released)
15	MF	RUS	Maksim Zyuzin (on loan to Sibir Novosibirsk)
17	MF	RUS	Maksim Burchenko (to Shinnik Yaroslavl)
26	DF	RUS	Sergei Bendz (to Kuban Krasnodar)
27	DF	RUS	Aleksei Aravin (to Spartak Nalchik)
35	MF	RUS	Roman Boldyrev (released)
37	DF	RUS	Aleksandr Kodenets (released)
40	MF	RUS	Vladislav Gudoshnikov (to Volga Tver)
77	FW	GEO	Otar Martsvaladze (to Krasnodar)
91	DF	RUS	Artyom Abramov (to Zvezda Ryazan)
—	FW	BIH	Petar Jelić (released, previously on loan to (Georgia (country)) Dinamo Tbilisi)

=== Zenit Saint Petersburg ===
In: Note: Flags indicate national team as defined under FIFA eligibility rules; some limited exceptions apply. Players may hold more than one non-FIFA nationality.

No.	Pos.	Nation	Player
4	DF	ITA	Domenico Criscito (from (Italy) Genoa)
17	MF	ITA	Alessandro Rosina (end of loan to (Italy) Cesena)
28	DF	DEN	Michael Lumb (end of loan to (Denmark) AaB)
74	MF	LTU	Ovidius Verbickas
78	FW	RUS	Artyom Patrelyak
79	DF	RUS	Artyom Deyneko
90	FW	RUS	Ilya Yeronin
94	MF	RUS	Aleksei Yevseyev
96	MF	RUS	Yevgeni Bashkirov
—	DF	FRA	Sébastien Puygrenier (end of loan to (France) AS Monaco)

Out: Note: Flags indicate national team as defined under FIFA eligibility rules; some limited exceptions apply. Players may hold more than one non-FIFA nationality.

No.	Pos.	Nation	Player
5	DF	POR	Fernando Meira (to (Spain) Real Zaragoza)
21	DF	CHI	Nicolás Peñailillo (end of loan from (Chile) Everton)
36	FW	RUS	Stanislav Matyash (on loan to Volgar-Gazprom Astrakhan)
56	DF	RUS	Kirill Kostin (released)
89	FW	RUS	Yevgeni Markov (released)
96	DF	RUS	Ilya Zuyev (released)
98	MF	RUS	Sergei Petrov (to Krylia Sovetov Samara)
—	FW	BLR	Sergei Kornilenko (to Krylia Sovetov Samara, previously on loan to (England) Blackpool)
