= Aushev =

Aushev may refer to:

- Ruslan Aushev
- Bashir Aushev
- Apti Aushev
- Rashid Aushev Central Stadium
- Maksharip Aushev (1966–2009)
