= Konov =

Konov (Bulgarian, Russian or Ukrainian: Конов) is a Slavic masculine surname, its feminine counterpart is Konova. It may refer to

- Aleksandar Konov (born 1993), Bulgarian football player
- Kina Konova (1872–1952), Bulgarian educator, translator, publicist and women's rights activist
- Lev Konov (born 1952), Russian composer, conductor and producer
- Sergey Konov (born 1948), Uzbekistani swimmer
- Vitaly Konov (born 1987), Ukrainian badminton player
- Zaurbek Konov (born 1985), Russian football player, twin brother of Aslanbek
