= Aleksandr Korotkov =

Aleksandr Korotkov may refer to:

- Aleksandr Korotkov (footballer, born 1987), Russian football player
- Aleksandr Korotkov (footballer, born 2000), Russian football player
- Aleksandr Mikhaylovich Korotkov, a Soviet intelligence officer
