= Tomilin =

Tomilin (Russian: Томилин) is a Russian masculine surname, its feminine counterpart is Tomilina. Notable people with the name include:

- Pavel Tomilin (born 1985), Russian football player
- Vitaly Tomilin (born 1974), Russian ice hockey player

== See also ==
- Tomilin Glacier in Antarctica
