= Imamkhan Gazdiyev =

Russian footballer

Personal information
- Full name: Imamkhan Magometgireyevich Gazdiyev
- Date of birth: 27 December 1993 (age 32)
- Height: 1.67 m (5 ft 5 1/2 in)
- Position: Midfielder

Youth career
- 2010: FC Rostov
- 2011: FC Zhemchuzhina Sochi

Senior career*
Years	Team	Apps	(Gls)
2012–2014	FC Angusht Nazran	28	(0)
2016	FC Angusht Nazran	7	(1)
- * Club domestic league appearances and goals

Imamkhan Magometgireyevich Gazdiyev (Russian: Имамхан Магометгиреевич Газдиев; born 27 December 1993) is a former Russian football midfielder.

== Club career ==
He made his debut in the Russian Second Division for FC Angusht Nazran on 26 July 2012 in a game against FC Torpedo Armavir. He made his Russian Football National League debut for Angusht on 14 April 2014 in a game against FC SKA-Energiya Khabarovsk.
