= Khasan Akhriyev =

Russian football player

Personal information
- Full name: Khasan Aslanbekovich Akhriyev
- Date of birth: 3 June 1994 (age 32)
- Place of birth: Malgobek, Russia
- Height: 1.74 m (5 ft 9 in)
- Position: Midfielder

Youth career
- –2011: FC Zhemchuzhina Sochi
- 2011–2014: FC Krasnodar

Senior career*
Years	Team	Apps	(Gls)
2012–2015	FC Krasnodar	0	(0)
2013–2014	FC Krasnodar-2	34	(6)
2014–2015	→ PFC Spartak Nalchik (loan)	32	(4)
2015–2017	PFC Spartak Nalchik	66	(10)
2018	FC Afips Afipsky	6	(0)
2018–2019	FC Angusht Nazran	25	(1)
2019–2020	FC SKA Rostov-on-Don	16	(2)
2020	FC Yessentuki	12	(0)

International career
2011	Russia U-17	4	(0)
- * Club domestic league appearances and goals

Khasan Aslanbekovich Akhriyev (Russian: Хасан Асланбекович Ахриев; born 3 June 1994) is a Russian former football player.

== Club career ==
He made his professional debut in the Russian Professional Football League for FC Krasnodar-2 on 12 July 2013 in a game against FC Chernomorets Novorossiysk.

He made his Russian Football National League debut for PFC Spartak Nalchik on 11 July 2016 in a game against FC Kuban Krasnodar.
