= Yevgeni Gavryuk =

Ukrainian-Russian footballer

Personal information
- Full name: Yevgeni Yuryevich Gavryuk
- Date of birth: 23 January 1987 (age 39)
- Place of birth: Kyiv, Ukrainian SSR, Soviet Union
- Height: 1.85 m (6 ft 1 in)
- Position: Forward

Team information
- Current team: Academy FC Torpedo Moscow (team supervisor)

Youth career
- 1998–2001: Youth Sportive School Ordzhonikidze

Senior career*
Years	Team	Apps	(Gls)
2004–2005	Toulouse FC (B team)	10	(1)
2005	FC Lokomotiv Moscow (reserves)		
2006	PFC Spartak Nalchik (reserves)		
2006	FC Lokomotiv Moscow (reserves)		
2007	FC SOYUZ-Gazprom Izhevsk	8	(0)
2008	FC Sportakademklub Moscow	34	(6)
2009	FC Mashuk-KMV Pyatigorsk	18	(4)
2009	FC Nosta Novotroitsk	12	(2)
2010–2012	FC Nizhny Novgorod	28	(1)
2011	→ FC Torpedo Moscow (loan)	19	(3)
2011–2012	→ FC Fakel Voronezh (loan)	18	(1)
2012–2013	FC Khimik Dzerzhinsk	24	(1)
2013	FC Sokol Saratov	20	(6)
2014	FC Luch-Energiya Vladivostok	6	(0)
2014	FC Zenit Penza	14	(3)
2015	FC Domodedovo Moscow	27	(9)

Managerial career
- 2017–2018: FC Anzhi Makhachkala (scout)
- 2019–2020: FC Inter Cherkessk (sports director)
- 2022: FC Tuapse (team supervisor)
- 2022–2023: FC Torpedo Moscow (U21 team supervisor)
- 2023–: Academy FC Torpedo Moscow (team supervisor)
- * Club domestic league appearances and goals

Yevgeni Yuryevich Gavryuk (Russian: Евгений Юрьевич Гаврюк; born 23 January 1987) is a Ukrainian professional football official and a former player. He also holds Russian citizenship.
