= Igor Chernyshov =

Igor Chernyshov may refer to:

- Igor Chernyshov (footballer) (born 1984), Russian footballer
- Igor Chernyshov (ice hockey) (born 2005), Russian ice hockey player
