= Ilez Gazdiyev =

Russian footballer

Personal information
- Full name: Ilez Akhmedovich Gazdiyev
- Date of birth: 2 November 1991 (age 35)
- Height: 1.79 m (5 ft 10 in)
- Positions: Defender; midfielder

Senior career*
Years	Team	Apps	(Gls)
2007–2008	FC Angusht Nazran (amateur)		
2009–2014	FC Angusht Nazran	117	(1)
2015	FC Angusht Nazran	9	(1)
2016–2019	FC Angusht Nazran	89	(4)
- * Club domestic league appearances and goals

Ilez Akhmedovich Gazdiyev (Russian: Илез Ахмедович Газдиев; born 2 November 1991) is a Russian former professional football player.

== Club career ==
He made his Russian Football National League debut for FC Angusht Nazran on 7 July 2013 in a game against FC Neftekhimik Nizhnekamsk.
