= Andrei Kuznetsov =

Andrei Kuznetsov may refer to:

- Andrei Kuznetsov (1873–1984), known as Father Akaki, Russian-born monk and Finnish supercentenarian
- Andrei Kuznetsov (volleyball) (1966–1994), Soviet volleyball player who participated in the 1988 Olympics
- Andrey Kuznetsov (politician) (born 1972), Russian politician
- Andrei Kuznetsov (footballer) (born 1988), Russian footballer
- Andrey Kuznetsov (tennis) (born 1991), Russian tennis player
- Andrei Kuznetsov (ice hockey), Russian hockey player who participated in the 2005 World Junior Ice Hockey Championships
