= Sergei Chernyshov =

Sergei Chernyshov may refer to:

- Sergei Chernyshov (footballer, born 1984), Russian association football player
- Sergey Chernyshev (footballer) (born 1990), Russian-Azerbaijani association football player
- Sergei Chernyshev (breakdancer) (born 2000), Russian breakdancer
