= Akhmed Parchiyev =

Russian footballer

Personal information
- Full name: Akhmed Khasanovich Parchiyev
- Date of birth: 10 July 1996 (age 30)
- Height: 1.69 m (5 ft 6 1/2 in)
- Position: Midfielder

Senior career*
Years	Team	Apps	(Gls)
2012–2015	FC Angusht Nazran	14	(0)
2016–2019	FC Angusht Nazran	77	(3)
- * Club domestic league appearances and goals

Akhmed Khasanovich Parchiyev (Russian: Ахмед Хасанович Парчиев; born 10 July 1996) is a Russian former football midfielder.

== Club career ==
He made his debut in the Russian Second Division for FC Angusht Nazran on 16 July 2012 in a game against FC Taganrog. He made his Russian Football National League debut for Angusht on 16 March 2014 in a game against FC Torpedo Moscow.
