= Mayboroda =

Mayboroda, Maiboroda or Majboroda is a Slavic surname (Cyrillic: Майборода). People with this name include:

- Andrei Mayboroda (born 1984), Russian football player
- Dmitry Mayboroda, Russian pianist, bronze medalist at Eurovision Young Musicians 2006
- Heorhiy Maiboroda (1913–1992), Ukrainian composer, brother of Platon
- Platon Maiboroda (1918–1989), Ukrainian composer, brother of Heorhiy
- Serhiy Mayboroda (born 1997), Ukrainian football player
- Svitlana Mayboroda (born 1981), Ukrainian mathematician
- Yulia Mayboroda (born 1980), Russian actress
