= Shirokov =

Shirokov (Russian: Широков) is a Russian masculine surname, its feminine counterpart is Shirokova. It may refer to

- Aleksejs Širokovs (born 1981), Latvian ice hockey player
- Anatoly Shirokov (born 1967), Russian politician
- Margarita Shirokova (born 1991), Russian football goalkeeper
- Maksim Shirokov (born 1994), Russian football forward
- Maksims Širokovs (born 1982), Latvian ice hockey player, brother of Aleksejs
- Pavel Shirokov (1893–1963), Russian poet
- Roman Shirokov (born 1981), Russian footballer
- Sergei Shirokov (born 1986), Russian ice hockey player
- Yurii Shirokov (1921–1980), Russian physicist and mathematician
