= Aleksandr Krupoder =

Russian footballer

Personal information
- Full name: Aleksandr Gennadyevich Krupoder
- Date of birth: 20 January 1992 (age 34)
- Height: 1.85 m (6 ft 1 in)
- Position: Forward

Senior career*
Years	Team	Apps	(Gls)
2009	FC Torpedo-ZIL Moscow	2	(0)
2010	FC Bashinformsvyaz-Dynamo Ufa	4	(0)
2011–2012	FC Istra	39	(7)
2012	FC Petrotrest St. Petersburg	5	(0)
2013	FC Podolye Podolsky district	7	(0)
2013–2014	FC Strogino Moscow	26	(5)
2014–2015	FC Yakutiya Yakutsk	18	(3)
2015–2016	FC Spartak Kostroma	28	(7)
2016–2017	FC Domodedovo Moscow	25	(2)
2017–2018	FC Veles Moscow	38	(6)
2019–2020	FC Luki-Energiya Velikiye Luki	22	(4)
- * Club domestic league appearances and goals

Aleksandr Gennadyevich Krupoder (Russian: Александр Геннадьевич Круподер; born 20 January 1992) is a Russian former professional football player.

== Club career ==
He made his Russian Football National League debut for FC Petrotrest Saint Petersburg on 17 July 2012 in a game against FC Tom Tomsk.
