= Aslan Dashayev =

Russian footballer

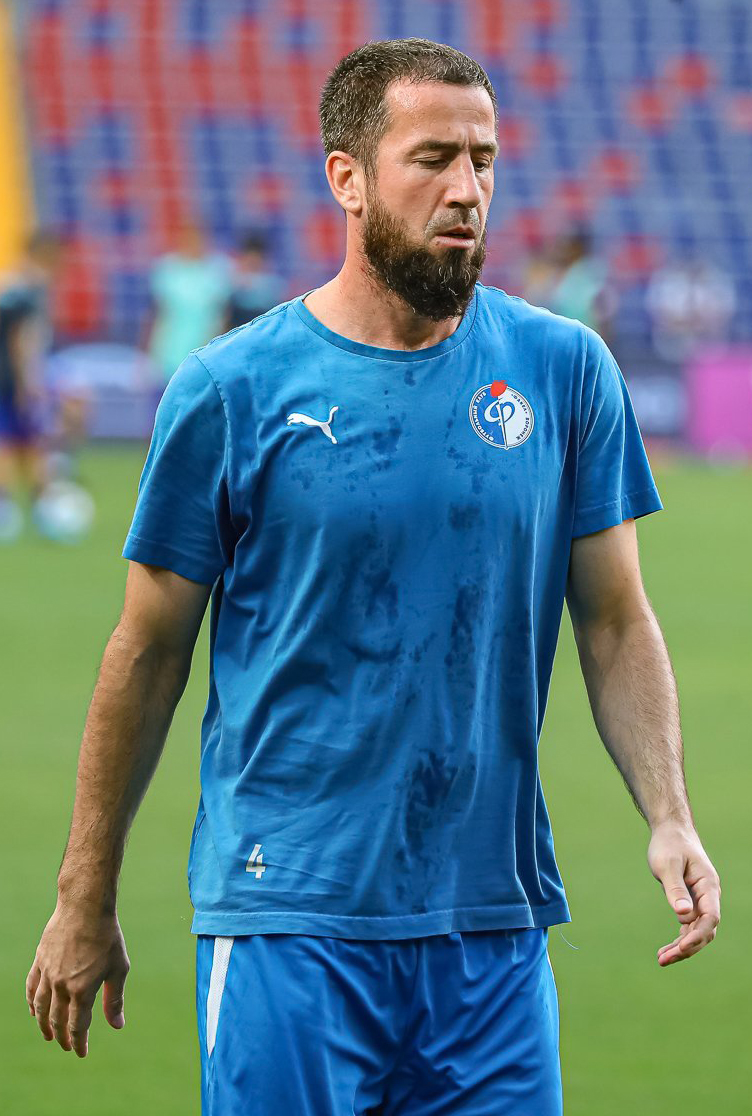
- Dashayev with Fakel in 2022

Personal information
- Full name: Aslan Abdusalayevich Dashayev
- Date of birth: 19 February 1989 (age 37)
- Place of birth: Grozny, Russian SFSR
- Height: 1.83 m (6 ft 0 in)
- Position: Centre-back

Team information
- Current team: Kuban-Holding

Senior career*
Years	Team	Apps	(Gls)
2006–2007	Terek-2 Grozny		
2008–2010	Terek Grozny	0	(0)
2011–2014	Angusht Nazran	91	(6)
2015–2017	Spartak Nalchik	77	(6)
2017–2019	Avangard Kursk	87	(6)
2020–2023	Fakel Voronezh	61	(7)
2023–2024	Volga Ulyanovsk	32	(3)
2024–2026	Kuban-Holding	48	(3)
2026	Nart Cherkessk	13	(1)
2026–	Kuban-Holding (amateur)		
- * Club domestic league appearances and goals as of 4 July 2026

Aslan Abdusalayevich Dashayev (Russian: Аслан Абдусалаевич Дашаев; born 19 February 1989) is a Russian footballer who plays for Kuban-Holding.

== Career ==
Dashayev made his professional debut for Terek Grozny on 13 July 2010 in the Russian Cup game against Luch-Energiya Vladivostok.

He made his Russian Football National League debut for Angusht Nazran on 7 July 2013 in a game against Neftekhimik Nizhnekamsk.

He played in the 2017–18 Russian Cup final for Avangard Kursk on 9 May 2018 in the Volgograd Arena against 2–1 winners Tosno.

Dashayev made his Russian Premier League debut for Fakel Voronezh on 17 July 2022 against Krasnodar.

Dashayev's contract with Fakel was terminated by mutual agreement on 31 January 2023. On the same day, Dashayev joined Volga Ulyanovsk in the Russian First League.

== Career statistics ==
As of 27 November 2022

Club	Season	League			Cup		Continental		Other		Total	
Club	Season	Division	Apps	Goals	Apps	Goals	Apps	Goals	Apps	Goals	Apps	Goals
Terek Grozny	2010	RPL	0	0	1	0	–		–		1	0
Angusht Nazran	2011–12	Second League	32	1	1	0	–		–		33	1
Angusht Nazran	2012–13	Second League	30	4	1	0	–		–		31	4
Angusht Nazran	2013–14	First League	29	1	2	0	–		–		31	1
Angusht Nazran	Total		91	6	4	0	0	0	0	0	95	6
Spartak Nalchik	2014–15	Second League	14	0	–		–		–		14	0
Spartak Nalchik	2015–16	Second League	26	2	4	0	–		–		30	2
Spartak Nalchik	2016–17	First League	37	4	2	1	–		5 (Note: Appearances in the FNL Cup)	1	44	6
Spartak Nalchik	Total		77	6	6	1	0	0	5	1	88	8
Avangard Kursk	2017–18	First League	34	3	6	0	–		–		40	3
Avangard Kursk	2018–19	First League	34	3	2	0	–		5	0	41	3
Avangard Kursk	2019–20	First League	19	0	0	0	–		–		19	0
Avangard Kursk	Total		87	6	8	0	0	0	5	0	100	6
Fakel Voronezh	2019–20	First League	2	1	–		–		3	0	5	1
Fakel Voronezh	2020–21	First League	22	1	1	0	–		–		23	1
Fakel Voronezh	2021–22	First League	31	3	2	0	–		–		33	3
Fakel Voronezh	2022–23	RPL	6	2	4	0	–		–		10	2
Fakel Voronezh	Total		61	7	7	0	0	0	3	0	71	7
Career total			316	25	26	1	0	0	13	1	355	27
