= Roman Kosyanchuk =

Russian footballer

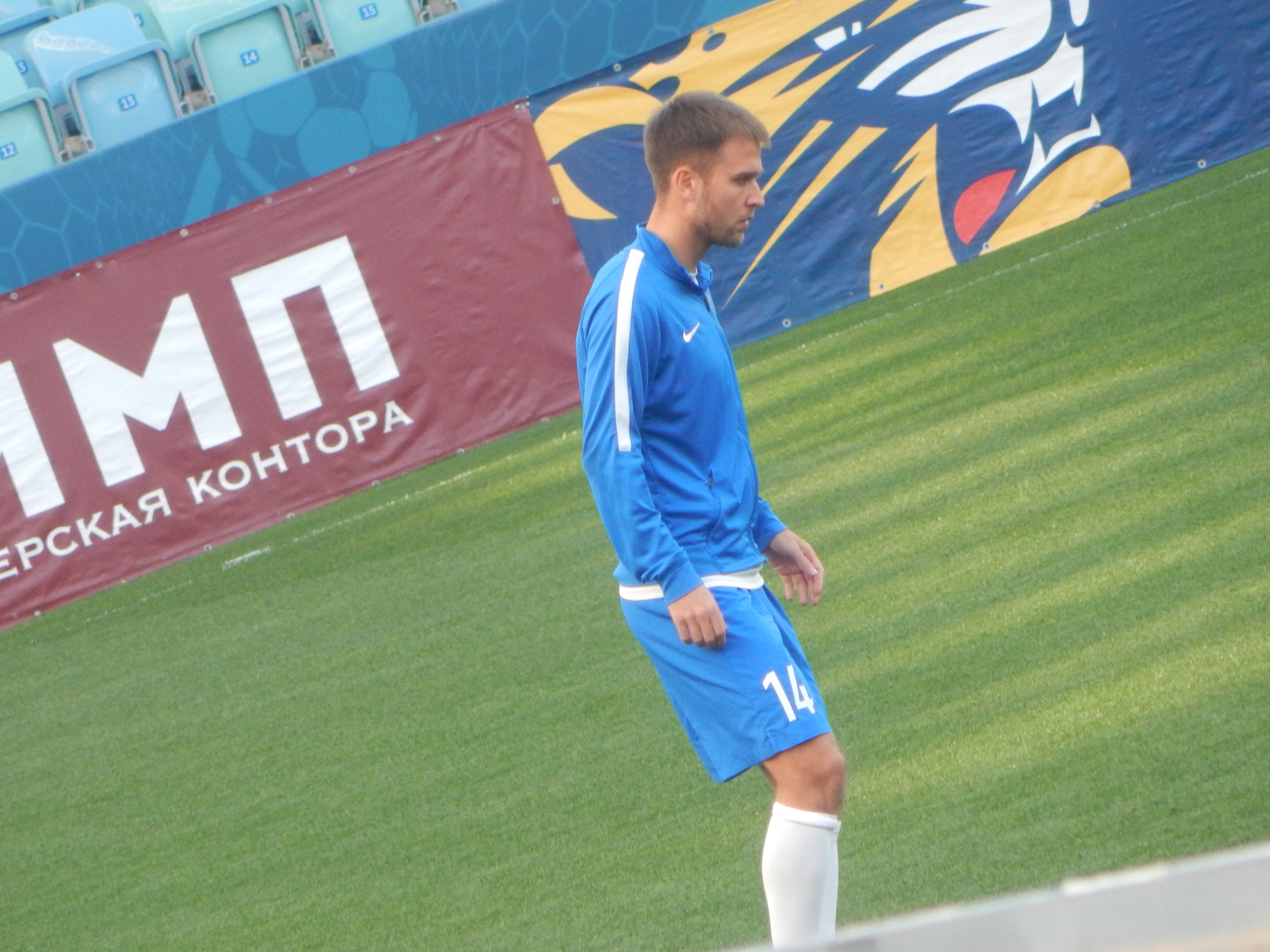
- 2018–19 Russian National Football League, match between FC Sochi and FC Tyumen. April 7, 2019, Fisht Olympic Stadium, Sochi, Russia

Personal information
- Full name: Roman Igorevich Kosyanchuk
- Date of birth: 24 October 1993 (age 33)
- Place of birth: Ashgabat, Turkmenistan
- Height: 1.79 m (5 ft 10 in)
- Position: Midfielder

Youth career
- FC Rubin Kazan

Senior career*
Years	Team	Apps	(Gls)
2011–2013	FC Rubin-2 Kazan	68	(7)
2013–2014	FC Neftekhimik Nizhnekamsk	11	(2)
2014–2016	FC Chertanovo Moscow	45	(11)
2016–2018	FC Torpedo Moscow	43	(2)
2018–2019	PFC Sochi	21	(0)
2019–2020	FC Fakel Voronezh	18	(0)
2020–2021	FC Novosibirsk	27	(1)
2021–2022	FC Olimp-Dolgoprudny	22	(3)
2022–2023	FC Tekstilshchik Ivanovo	21	(2)
2023–2025	FC Chelyabinsk	48	(2)
- * Club domestic league appearances and goals as of 14 June 2025

Roman Igorevich Kosyanchuk (Russian: Роман Игоревич Косянчук; born 24 October 1993) is a Russian football midfielder.

== Club career ==
He made his debut in the Russian Second Division for FC Rubin-2 Kazan on 25 April 2011 in a game against FC Zenit-Izhevsk Izhevsk.

He made his Russian Football National League debut for FC Neftekhimik Nizhnekamsk on 13 October 2013 in a game against FC Khimik Dzerzhinsk.
