= Aleksandr Podbeltsev =

Russian footballer

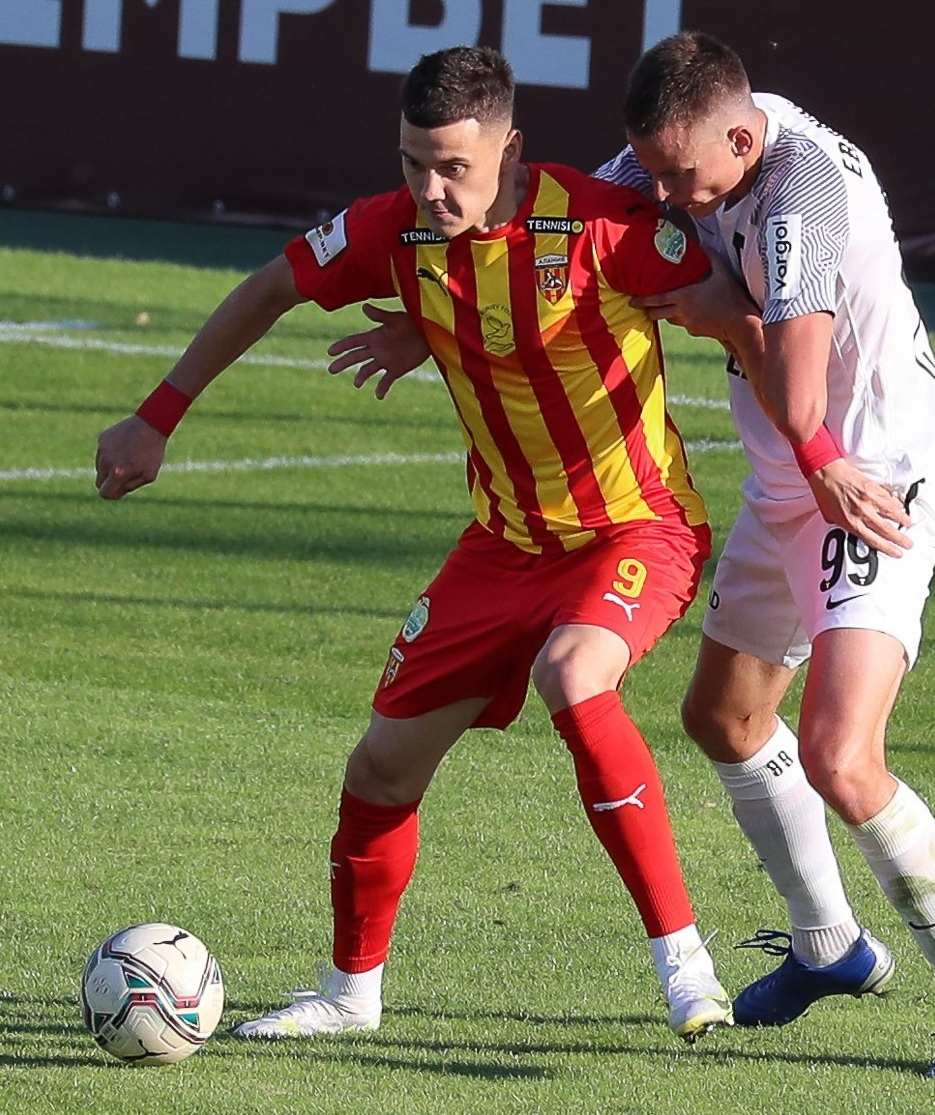
- Podbeltsev with Alania in 2021

Personal information
- Full name: Aleksandr Yuryevich Podbeltsev
- Date of birth: 15 March 1993 (age 33)
- Place of birth: Semikarakorsk, Russia
- Height: 1.87 m (6 ft 2 in)
- Position: Forward

Senior career*
Years	Team	Apps	(Gls)
2009–2013	Semikarakorsk		
2014	SKVO Rostov-on-Don	9	(0)
2015	Donenergo Aksay		
2015–2016	SKA Rostov-on-Don	25	(10)
2016–2018	Baltika Kaliningrad	38	(2)
2017–2018	→ Afips Afipsky (loan)	27	(13)
2018–2020	Chayka Peschanokopskoye	51	(18)
2020–2021	Fakel Voronezh	8	(0)
2021	Alania Vladikavkaz	2	(0)
2022	Sokol Saratov	10	(1)
2022–2024	Amkar Perm	54	(12)
2024–2025	Uralets-TS Nizhny Tagil	34	(14)
- * Club domestic league appearances and goals as of 19 October 2025

Aleksandr Yuryevich Podbeltsev (Russian: Александр Юрьевич Подбельцев; born 15 March 1993) is a Russian football forward.

== Club career ==
Podbeltsev made his debut in the Russian Professional Football League for SKVO Rostov-on-Don on 10 April 2014 in a game against MITOS Novocherkassk.

He made his Russian Football National League debut for Baltika Kaliningrad on 11 July 2016 in a game against Shinnik Yaroslavl.
