= Magomed Guguyev =

Russian footballer (born 1988)

Personal information
- Full name: Magomed Guguyev
- Date of birth: 15 September 1988 (age 38)
- Place of birth: Grozny, Russian SFSR, Soviet Union
- Height: 1.80 m (5 ft 11 in)
- Position: Striker

Senior career*
Years	Team	Apps	(Gls)
2009	Lider Khosi-Yurt		
2010–2014	Angusht Nazran	119	(34)
2014–2017	Spartak Nalchik	92	(31)
2018	Armavir	13	(2)
2018	Urozhay Krasnodar	9	(1)
2019–2020	Dynamo Stavropol	8	(1)
2020–2021	Spartak Nalchik	11	(3)
2022	Spartak Nalchik	8	(0)
2024–2025	Angusht Nazran	45	(4)
Total		305	(76)
- * Club domestic league appearances and goals

Magomed Ruslanovich Guguyev (Russian: Магомед Русланович Гугуев; born 15 September 1988) is a Russian former professional football player.

== Club career ==
He made his Russian Football National League debut for Angusht Nazran on 7 July 2013 in a game against Neftekhimik Nizhnekamsk.
