= Seyt-Daut Garakoyev =

Russian footballer

Personal information
- Full name: Seyt-Daut Magomedsaliyevich Garakoyev
- Date of birth: 26 August 1992 (age 34)
- Place of birth: Nazran, Russia
- Height: 1.72 m (5 ft 8 in)
- Position: Midfielder

Senior career*
Years	Team	Apps	(Gls)
2009–2010	FC Lokomotiv Moscow	0	(0)
2011–2012	FC Anzhi Makhachkala	0	(0)
2013	FC Olimpia Volgograd	10	(0)
2013	FC Angusht Nazran	22	(4)
2014	FC Ufa	14	(2)
2014	FC Luch-Energiya Vladivostok	8	(0)
2015	FC Angusht Nazran	8	(3)
2016	FC Fakel Voronezh	13	(2)
2017	FC Volgar Astrakhan	7	(0)
2017	FC Angusht Nazran	6	(1)
2018	FC Shukura Kobuleti	10	(0)
2019–2021	FC Veles Moscow	26	(5)
2021	FC Druzhba Maykop	9	(2)

International career
2009	Russia U-17	7	(2)
2010	Russia U-18	5	(2)
2011	Russia U-19	3	(0)
- * Club domestic league appearances and goals

Seyt-Daut Magomedsaliyevich Garakoyev (Russian: Сейт-Даут Магомедсалиевич Гаракоев; born 26 August 1992) is a Russian former football midfielder.

== Club career ==
He made his debut in the Russian Second Division for FC Olimpia Volgograd on 15 April 2013 in a game against FC Volgar-Astrakhan Astrakhan.

He made his Russian Football National League debut for FC Angusht Nazran on 7 July 2013 in a game against FC Neftekhimik Nizhnekamsk.

== Personal life ==
He is the older brother of Bilan Garakoyev, who is also a footballer.
