= Aleksandr Korotkov (footballer, born 1987) =

Russian footballer and coach

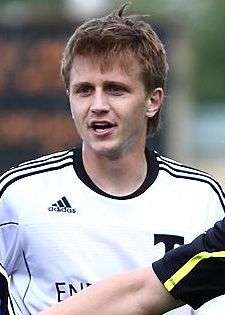

Personal information
- Full name: Aleksandr Aleksandrovich Korotkov
- Date of birth: 13 January 1987 (age 39)
- Place of birth: Belebey, Russian SFSR
- Height: 1.83 m (6 ft 0 in)
- Positions: Midfielder; defender

Team information
- Current team: FC Kolomna (assistant coach)

Senior career*
Years	Team	Apps	(Gls)
2004	FC Akademika Moscow		
2004–2007	FC Zenit Saint Petersburg	0	(0)
2007	FC Tekstilshchik-Telekom Ivanovo	37	(2)
2008–2010	FC Sportakademklub Moscow	9	(0)
2008	→ FC Nara-ShBFR Naro-Fominsk (loan)	8	(1)
2009	→ FC Torpedo-ZIL Moscow (loan)	24	(2)
2010	→ FC Torpedo Moscow (loan)	15	(0)
2010	→ FC Chernomorets Novorossiysk (loan)	8	(0)
2011–2012	FC Tyumen	32	(4)
2012–2014	FC Khimik Dzerzhinsk	55	(5)
2014	FC Zenit Penza	17	(0)
2015–2017	FC Domodedovo Moscow	49	(4)
2017–2018	FC Veles Moscow	39	(3)

International career
2005	Russia U-19	4	(0)
2008	Russia U-21	1	(0)

Managerial career
- 2019: FC Ararat Moscow (assistant)
- 2020–: FC Kolomna (assistant)
- * Club domestic league appearances and goals

Aleksandr Aleksandrovich Korotkov (Russian: Александр Александрович Коротков; born 13 January 1987) is a Russian professional football coach and a former player. He is an assistant coach with FC Kolomna.

== Club career ==
He played three seasons in the Russian Football National League for FC Tekstilshchik-Telekom Ivanovo, FC Sportakademklub Moscow and FC Khimik Dzerzhinsk.
