= Nikita Nikolayev =

Russian footballer

Personal information
- Full name: Nikita Stanislavovich Nikolayev
- Date of birth: 24 February 1996
- Place of birth: Nizhny Novgorod, Russia
- Date of death: 21 November 2021 (aged 25)
- Place of death: Nizhny Novgorod, Russia
- Height: 1.73 m (5 ft 8 in)
- Positions: Defender; midfielder

Senior career*
Years	Team	Apps	(Gls)
2013–2015	FC Volga Nizhny Novgorod	12	(0)
2015	FC Volga-Olimpiyets Nizhny Novgorod	8	(0)
2016	FC Volga Nizhny Novgorod	2	(0)
2016–2017	FC Olimpiyets Nizhny Novgorod	8	(0)
2017–2018	FC Mordovia Saransk	8	(0)
- * Club domestic league appearances and goals

Nikita Stanislavovich Nikolayev (Russian: Никита Станиславович Николаев; born 24 February 1996; died 21 November 2021) was a Russian football player.

== Club career ==
He made his debut in the Russian Football National League for FC Volga Nizhny Novgorod on 5 October 2014 in a game against FC Khimik Dzerzhinsk.
