= Lasha Imedashvili =

Russian footballer

Personal information
- Full name: Lasha Zviadiyevich Imedashvili
- Date of birth: 16 July 1996 (age 30)
- Place of birth: Moscow, Russia
- Height: 1.80 m (5 ft 11 in)
- Position: Striker

Senior career*
Years	Team	Apps	(Gls)
2014–2015	FC SKA-Energiya Khabarovsk	11	(0)
2016	FC Zenit Penza	9	(0)
2017–2019	FC Telavi		
2019	FC Ararat Moscow	10	(1)
2020	FC Zorky Krasnogorsk	0	(0)
- * Club domestic league appearances and goals

Lasha Zviadiyevich Imedashvili (Russian: Лаша Звиадиевич Имедашвили; born 16 July 1996) is a Russian former football player.

== Club career ==
He made his professional debut in the Russian Football National League for FC SKA-Energiya Khabarovsk on 19 July 2014 in a game against FC Khimik Dzerzhinsk.
