= Khazbulat Khamkhoyev =

Russian footballer (born 1993)

Personal information
- Full name: Khazbulat Bogdanovich Khamkhoyev
- Date of birth: 16 November 1993 (age 32)
- Place of birth: [[Grozny]], Russia
- Height: 1.86 m (6 ft 1 in)
- Position: Goalkeeper

Senior career*
| Years | Team | Apps | (Gls) |
| 2012–2016 | FC Angusht Nazran | 87 | (0) |
| 2016 | FC Sochi | 2 | (0) |
| 2017–2019 | FC Angusht Nazran | 67 | (0) |
| 2019–2020 | FC Mashuk-KMV Pyatigorsk | 5 | (0) |
| 2020 | FC Tuapse | 8 | (0) |
| 2021–2022 | FC Dynamo Makhachkala | 63 | (0) |
| 2023 | FC Ufa | 13 | (0) |
| 2023–2024 | FC Amkar Perm | 28 | (0) |
- * Club domestic league appearances and goals as of 19 October 2024

Khazbulat Bogdanovich Khamkhoyev (Russian: Хазбулат Богданович Хамхоев; born 16 November 1993) is a Russian football goalkeeper.

== Club career ==
He made his debut in the Russian Second Division for FC Angusht Nazran on 16 July 2012 in a game against FC Taganrog. He made his Russian Football National League debut for Angusht on 7 July 2013 in a game against FC Neftekhimik Nizhnekamsk.
