= Denis Bolshakov =

Russian professional footballer

Personal information
- Full name: Denis Aleksandrovich Bolshakov
- Date of birth: 7 June 1987 (age 39)
- Place of birth: Kasimov, Russian SFSR
- Height: 1.82 m (6 ft 0 in)
- Position: Midfielder

Senior career*
Years	Team	Apps	(Gls)
2004–2005	OGC Nice (B team)	1	(0)
2005	FC Lokomotiv Moscow	0	(0)
2006	FC Dynamo Moscow	0	(0)
2007	FC Luch-Energiya Vladivostok	2	(0)
2007	FC SKA-Energia Khabarovsk	4	(0)
2008	FC Tom Tomsk	0	(0)
2009	FC Rusichi Oryol	23	(2)
2010	FC Istra	30	(6)
2011–2014	FC Torpedo Moscow	65	(1)
2014–2016	FC Domodedovo Moscow	69	(11)
2017–2018	FSK Dolgoprudny	24	(2)
2018–2019	Saif Sporting Club	12	(6)

International career
2004	Russia U-17	6	(0)
2005	Russia U-19	2	(0)
- * Club domestic league appearances and goals

Denis Aleksandrovich Bolshakov (Russian: Денис Александрович Большаков; born 7 June 1987) is a Russian former professional footballer.

== Club career ==
He made his debut in the Russian Premier League in 2007 for FC Luch-Energiya Vladivostok.

In 2018, he signed for Saif Sporting Club in Bangladesh.
