= Akhmet Barakhoyev =

Russian footballer

Personal information
- Full name: Akhmet Magametovich Barakhoyev
- Date of birth: 10 September 1984 (age 42)
- Height: 1.80 m (5 ft 11 in)
- Positions: Midfielder; forward

Senior career*
Years	Team	Apps	(Gls)
2005–2006	FC Angusht Nazran	40	(5)
2007–2009	FC Druzhba Maykop	75	(11)
2010	FC Angusht Nazran	23	(1)
2011	FC Dynamo Stavropol	11	(0)
2012	FC Zimbru Chișinău	7	(1)
2013	FC Druzhba Maykop	7	(1)
2013–2015	FC Dacia Chișinău	48	(4)
2015–2017	FC Angusht Nazran	29	(1)
- * Club domestic league appearances and goals

Akhmet Magametovich Barakhoyev (Russian: Ахмет Магаметович Барахоев; born 10 September 1984) is a former Russian professional football player.

== Club career ==
In 2012, he played for the Moldovan club FC Zimbru Chișinău.
