= Apti Aushev =

Russian footballer

Personal information
- Full name: Apti Isayevich Aushev
- Date of birth: 15 January 1985 (age 41)
- Height: 1.78 m (5 ft 10 in)
- Position: Defender

Senior career*
Years	Team	Apps	(Gls)
2003–2006	FC Angusht Nazran	79	(1)
2007	FC Angusht Nazran (amateur)		
2009–2016	FC Angusht Nazran	169	(0)
2016–2017	FC Druzhba Maykop	22	(0)
2017–2019	FC Angusht Nazran	45	(0)
- * Club domestic league appearances and goals

Apti Isayevich Aushev (Russian: Апти Исаевич Аушев; born 15 January 1985) is a Russian former professional football player.

== Club career ==
He played two seasons in the Russian Football National League for FC Angusht Nazran.

== Personal life ==
He is the older brother of Khavazh Aushev.
