= Marat Garayev =

Russian footballer

Personal information
- Full name: Marat Rinatovich Garayev
- Date of birth: 20 May 1990 (age 36)
- Place of birth: Dimitrovgrad, Ulyanovsk Oblast, Russian SFSR
- Height: 1.72 m (5 ft 7 1/2 in)
- Position: Midfielder

Youth career
- FC KAMAZ Naberezhnye Chelny

Senior career*
Years	Team	Apps	(Gls)
2009–2012	FC KAMAZ Naberezhnye Chelny	44	(0)
2013	FC Dolgoprudny	6	(0)
2013–2014	FC KAMAZ Naberezhnye Chelny	18	(0)
2014–2015	FC MITOS Novocherkassk	27	(4)
2016	FC KAMAZ Naberezhnye Chelny	2	(0)
- * Club domestic league appearances and goals

Marat Rinatovich Garayev (Russian: Марат Ринатович Гараев; born 20 May 1990) is a former Russian professional football player of Tatar origin.

== Club career ==
He played 3 seasons in the Russian Football National League for FC KAMAZ Naberezhnye Chelny.
