= Dmitri Proshin (footballer, born 1984) =

Russian footballer

Personal information
- Full name: Dmitri Aleksandrovich Proshin
- Date of birth: 6 January 1984 (age 42)
- Place of birth: Veliky Novgorod, Russian SFSR
- Height: 1.84 m (6 ft 1/2 in)
- Positions: Midfielder; defender

Senior career*
Years	Team	Apps	(Gls)
2003	Petrotrest St. Petersburg	16	(0)
2005	Pskov-2000	9	(0)
2006–2007	FC Apatit Kirovsk		
2008–2011	Sever Murmansk	132	(30)
2012	Petrotrest St. Petersburg	0	(0)
2012–2015	Pskov-747	90	(24)
2015	→ Tosno (loan)	12	(1)
2016	Narva Trans	34	(14)
2017	Luki-Energiya Velikiye Luki	15	(3)
2018–2019	Narva Trans	43	(7)

Managerial career
- 2020: FC Dynamo Saint Petersburg
- * Club domestic league appearances and goals

Dmitri Aleksandrovich Proshin (Russian: Дмитрий Александрович Прошин; born 6 January 1984) is a Russian professional football coach and a former player.

== Club career ==
He made his Russian Football National League debut for FC Tosno on 31 August 2015 in a game against FC Volgar Astrakhan.

On 3 August 2019, Proshin announced that he would retire and continue as a youth coach at a Sports School in Pushkin, Saint Petersburg.
