= Sergey Konov =

Uzbekistani swimmer (born 1948)

Personal information
- Born: 28 February 1948 (age 78) Tashkent, Uzbek SSR, Soviet Union

Sport
- Sport: Swimming

Sergey Konov (born 28 February 1948) is an Uzbekistani former butterfly swimmer. He competed in two events at the 1968 Summer Olympics for the Soviet Union.
