= Sergei Tyupikov =

Russian footballer

Personal information
- Full name: Sergei Vladimirovich Tyupikov
- Date of birth: 11 May 1988 (age 38)
- Place of birth: Kostroma, Russian SFSR
- Height: 1.82 m (5 ft 11 1/2 in)
- Positions: Forward; midfielder

Youth career
- FC Spartak Kostroma

Senior career*
Years	Team	Apps	(Gls)
2005–2007	FC Spartak Kostroma	43	(4)
2008	FC Dynamo Kostroma (D4)		
2008	FC Spartak Kostroma	16	(4)
2009	FC Nosta Novotroitsk	2	(0)
2010	FC Torpedo-ZIL Moscow	31	(8)
2011–2012	FC Ufa	8	(0)
2012–2013	FC Lada Togliatti	10	(1)
2013–2014	FC Spartak Kostroma	27	(2)
2014–2015	FC Zenit-Izhevsk	24	(4)
2015–2016	FC Torpedo Moscow	23	(5)
- * Club domestic league appearances and goals

Sergei Vladimirovich Tyupikov (Russian: Серге́й Владимирович Тюпиков; born 11 May 1988) is a former Russian professional football player.

== Club career ==
He played in the Russian Football National League for FC Nosta Novotroitsk in 2009.
