= Aleksei Pavlishin =

Russian footballer

Personal information
- Full name: Aleksei Olegovich Pavlishin
- Date of birth: 5 September 1995 (age 31)
- Place of birth: Astrakhan, Russia
- Height: 1.77 m (5 ft 9 1/2 in)
- Position: Midfielder

Team information
- Current team: FC Volgar Astrakhan
- Number: 7

Senior career*
Years	Team	Apps	(Gls)
2015–2016	FC Volgar Astrakhan	1	(0)
2017–2018	FC Smena Komsomolsk-na-Amure	20	(1)
2018–	FC Volgar Astrakhan	241	(4)
- * Club domestic league appearances and goals as of 15 November 2026

Aleksei Olegovich Pavlishin (Russian: Алексей Олегович Павлишин; born 5 September 1995) is a Russian football player who plays for FC Volgar Astrakhan.

== Club career ==
He made his debut in the Russian Football National League for FC Volgar Astrakhan on 21 May 2016 in a game against FC Sibir Novosibirsk.
