= Valiabdula Magomedov =

Russian footballer

Personal information
- Full name: Valiabdula Guseynovich Magomedov
- Date of birth: 21 June 1986 (age 40)
- Place of birth: Makhachkala, Russian SFSR
- Height: 1.80 m (5 ft 11 in)
- Position: Midfielder

Senior career*
Years	Team	Apps	(Gls)
2004	FC Dynamo Stavropol	29	(8)
2005	FC Dynamo Stavropol (amateur)		
2006	FC Anzhi Makhachkala	18	(0)
2007	FC Biolog Novokubansk (amateur)		
2008	FC Dynamo Stavropol	21	(2)
2009	FC Stavropol	20	(6)
2010–2011	FC Baltika Kaliningrad	35	(4)
2011–2012	FC Ufa	16	(5)
2012–2013	FC Biolog-Novokubansk Progress	21	(4)
2013	FC Gazprom transgaz Stavropol Ryzdvyany	20	(3)
2014	FC Zenit Penza	6	(0)
2014–2015	FC Dynamo GTS Stavropol	31	(4)
2015–2018	FC Dynamo Stavropol	89	(19)
- * Club domestic league appearances and goals

Valiabdula Guseynovich Magomedov (Russian: Валиабдула Гусейнович Магомедов; born 21 June 1986) is a Russian former professional football player.

== Club career ==
He made his Russian Football National League debut for FC Anzhi Makhachkala on 29 March 2006 in a game against FC Lada Tolyatti. He played 2 more seasons in the FNL for FC Baltika Kaliningrad.
