= Khimik Stadium (Dzerzhinsk) =

Multi-purpose stadium in Dzerzhinsk, Russia

Coordinates: 56.2°N 43.5°E

- Interactive map of Khimik Stadium
- Location: Dzerzhinsk, Russia
- Capacity: 5,266
- Surface: Artificial turf

Construction
- Built: 1930
- Renovated: 1957, 1964, 1977, 2008, 2011

Tenant
- Khimik Dzerzhinsk

Khimik Stadium is a multi-purpose stadium in Dzerzhinsk, Russia. It is currently used mostly for football matches and is the home stadium of Khimik Dzerzhinsk. The stadium holds 5,266 people, all seated.
