= Semyon Nastusenko =

Russian footballer

Personal information
- Full name: Semyon Vladimirovich Nastusenko
- Date of birth: 16 November 1986 (age 39)
- Place of birth: Malaya Areshevka, Russian SFSR
- Height: 1.86 m (6 ft 1 in)
- Position: Defender

Senior career*
| Years | Team | Apps | (Gls) |
| 2005 | FC Saturn Moscow Oblast | 0 | (0) |
| 2005–2006 | FC Saturn Yegoryevsk | 9 | (2) |
| 2007–2008 | FC Dynamo Vologda | 63 | (8) |
| 2009–2010 | FC KAMAZ Naberezhnye Chelny | 29 | (0) |
| 2011–2012 | FC Neftekhimik Nizhnekamsk | 31 | (2) |
| 2012 | FC Sokol Saratov | 9 | (0) |
| 2013–2014 | FC Avangard Kursk | 26 | (1) |
| 2015–2016 | FC Volga Tver | 22 | (0) |
| 2016–2018 | FC Saturn Ramenskoye | 37 | (1) |
| 2019 | FC Saturn Ramenskoye | 8 | (0) |
- * Club domestic league appearances and goals

Semyon Vladimirovich Nastusenko (Russian: Семён Владимирович Настусенко; born 16 November 1986) is a Russian former professional footballer.

== Club career ==
He made his professional debut in the Russian Second Division in 2005 for FC Saturn Yegoryevsk.

He played 2 seasons in the Russian Football National League for FC KAMAZ Naberezhnye Chelny.
