= Yevgeni Nasedkin =

Russian footballer

Personal information
- Full name: Yevgeni Sergeyevich Nasedkin
- Date of birth: 22 January 1996 (age 30)
- Place of birth: Moscow, Russia
- Height: 1.76 m (5 ft 9 in)
- Position: Midfielder

Youth career
- FC Khimki
- FC Strogino Moscow

Senior career*
Years	Team	Apps	(Gls)
2013–2019	FC Strogino Moscow	94	(7)
2017–2018	→ FC Veles Moscow (loan)	23	(3)
2019	FC Nosta Novotroitsk	8	(0)
2019–2020	FC Zvezda Perm	15	(0)
2020–2021	FC Shinnik Yaroslavl	11	(0)
2021	→ FC Luki-Energiya Velikiye Luki (loan)	10	(1)
2021	FC Luki-Energiya Velikiye Luki	13	(1)
2022–2023	FC Peresvet Podolsk	31	(4)
2023	FC Saturn Ramenskoye	9	(0)

International career^{‡}
2014	Russia U-18	2	(0)
- * Club domestic league appearances and goals as of 10 June 2023 ‡ National team caps and goals as of 7 January 2014

Yevgeni Sergeyevich Nasedkin (Russian: Евгений Сергеевич Наседкин; born 22 January 1996) is a Russian football player.

== Club career ==
He made his debut in the Russian Football National League for FC Shinnik Yaroslavl on 2 August 2020 in a game against FC Torpedo Moscow, as a starter.
