= Liski, Russia =

Liski (Russian: Лиски) is the name of several inhabited localities in Russia.

== Urban localities ==
- Liski, Voronezh Oblast, a town in Liskinsky District of Voronezh Oblast

== Rural localities ==
- Liski, Bryansk Oblast, a village in Pavlovsky Selsoviet of Unechsky District of Bryansk Oblast
- Liski, Kaliningrad Oblast, a settlement in Khrabrovsky Rural Okrug of Guryevsky District of Kaliningrad Oblast
- Liski, Zaluzhenskoye Rural Settlement, Liskinsky District, Voronezh Oblast, a selo in Zaluzhenskoye Rural Settlement of Liskinsky District of Voronezh Oblast
