= Kirill Rodionov =

Russian footballer

Personal information
- Full name: Kirill Sergeyevich Rodionov
- Date of birth: 22 April 1996 (age 30)
- Place of birth: Nakhabino, Russia
- Height: 1.66 m (5 ft 5 in)
- Position: Midfielder

Senior career*
Years	Team	Apps	(Gls)
2014–2016	FC Khimki	41	(0)
2016–2017	FC Baltika Kaliningrad	45	(1)
2018–2019	FC Zorky Krasnogorsk	31	(1)
2019–2021	FC Veles Moscow	45	(3)
2021–2022	FC Neftekhimik Nizhnekamsk	27	(0)
2022–2023	FC Rotor Volgograd	33	(2)
- * Club domestic league appearances and goals

Kirill Sergeyevich Rodionov (Russian: Кирилл Сергеевич Родионов; born 22 April 1996) is a Russian former football player.

== Club career ==
He made his professional debut in the Russian Professional Football League for FC Khimki on 16 August 2014 in a game against FC Pskov-747.

He made his Russian Football National League debut for FC Baltika Kaliningrad on 11 July 2016 in a game against FC Shinnik Yaroslavl.
