= Timur Teberdiyev =

Russian footballer

Personal information
- Full name: Timur Arturovich Teberdiyev
- Date of birth: 31 March 1992 (age 34)
- Place of birth: Nalchik, Russia
- Height: 1.87 m (6 ft 2 in)
- Position: Defender

Senior career*
Years	Team	Apps	(Gls)
2010–2012	PFC Spartak Nalchik	0	(0)
2012–2013	FC Mashuk-KMV Pyatigorsk	36	(1)
2014–2015	FC Mashuk-KMV Pyatigorsk	27	(0)
2015–2019	PFC Spartak Nalchik	62	(1)
2020–2021	PFC Spartak Nalchik	11	(0)
2021	PFC Dynamo Stavropol	1	(0)
- * Club domestic league appearances and goals

Timur Arturovich Teberdiyev (Russian: Тимур Артурович Тебердиев; born 31 March 1992) is a Russian former football defender.

== Club career ==
He made his debut in the Russian Second Division for FC Mashuk-KMV Pyatigorsk on 16 July 2012 in a game against FC Dagdizel Kaspiysk. He made his Russian Football National League debut for PFC Spartak Nalchik on 27 July 2016 in a game against FC Shinnik Yaroslavl.
