= Afipsky =

Afipsky Афипский
- Urban-type settlement
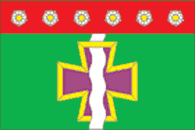
- Flag
- Interactive map of Afipsky
- Location of Afipsky Afipsky (Krasnodar Krai)
- Coordinates: 44°54′00″N 38°50′00″E
- Country: Russia
- Federal subject: Krasnodar Krai
- Administrative district: Seversky District
- Elevation: 24 m (79 ft)

Population (2010 Census)
  - Total: 18,969
  - Estimate (2025): 24,589 (+29.6%)
- Time zone: UTC+3 (MSK)
- Postal code: 353235–353236
- OKTMO ID: 03643152051

Afipsky (Russian: Афи́пский) is an urban locality (an urban-type settlement) in Seversky District of Krasnodar Krai, Russia, located on the left bank of the Afips River, 15 kilometers (9.3 mi) from Krasnodar. Population: 23,592 (2021 census);

It was founded in 1865 as the stanitsa of Georgiyeafipskaya (Георгиеафипская). Urban-type settlement status was granted to it on April 15, 1958.

A professional football team FC Afips Afipsky is based there.

Historical population
Year	Pop.	±%
1959	9,923	—
1970	13,623	+37.3%
1979	14,975	+9.9%
1989	15,995	+6.8%
2002	17,977	+12.4%
2010	18,969	+5.5%
2021	23,592	+24.4%
Source: Censuses
