= Azamat Gurfov =

Russian footballer

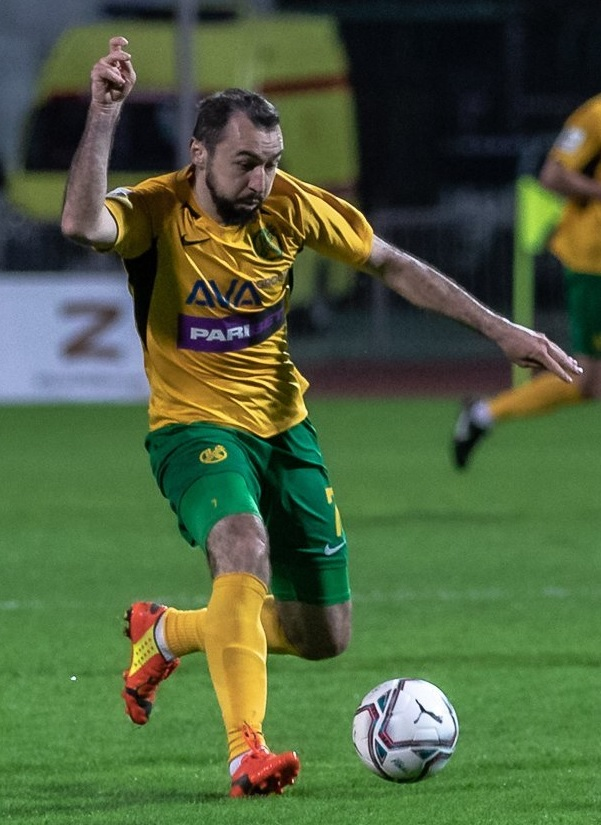
- Gurfov with Kuban Krasnodar in 2022

Personal information
- Full name: Azamat Umarbiyevich Gurfov
- Date of birth: 27 February 1994 (age 32)
- Place of birth: Vtoroy Lesken, Russia
- Height: 1.80 m (5 ft 11 in)
- Position: Midfielder

Senior career*
Years	Team	Apps	(Gls)
2011–2017	PFC Spartak Nalchik	49	(2)
2017–2018	FC Avangard Kursk	34	(1)
2018–2020	FC Armavir	51	(3)
2020–2024	FC Kuban Krasnodar	68	(14)
- * Club domestic league appearances and goals as of 25 May 2024

Azamat Umarbiyevich Gurfov (Russian: Азамат Умарбиевич Гурфов; born 27 February 1994) is a Russian football player.

== Club career ==
He made his professional debut in the Russian Professional Football League for PFC Spartak Nalchik on 12 August 2014 in a game against FC Angusht Nazran. He made his Russian Football National League debut for Spartak Nalchik on 8 March 2017 in a game against FC Dynamo Moscow.

He played in the 2017–18 Russian Cup final for FC Avangard Kursk on 9 May 2018 in the Volgograd Arena against 2–1 winners FC Tosno.
