= Zaurbek Konov =

Russian footballer

Personal information
- Full name: Zaurbek Azret-Aliyevich Konov
- Date of birth: 2 January 1985 (age 41)
- Place of birth: Nalchik, Russian SFSR
- Height: 1.73 m (5 ft 8 in)
- Position: Midfielder

Senior career*
Years	Team	Apps	(Gls)
2003–2005	PFC Spartak-2 Nalchik		
2006–2007	PFC Spartak Nalchik	0	(0)
2009–2013	FC Kavkaztransgaz-2005 Ryzdvyany	101	(13)
2013–2014	FC Biolog-Novokubansk Progress	32	(5)
2014–2015	PFC Spartak Nalchik	31	(3)
2015–2017	FC Angusht Nazran	68	(16)
2018	FC Kubanskaya Korona Shevchenko		
2019	FC PSK Pervorechenskoye		
2019	FC Kuban-Holding Pavlovskaya (amateur)		
- * Club domestic league appearances and goals

Zaurbek Azret-Aliyevich Konov (Russian: Заурбек Азрет-Алиевич Конов; born 2 January 1985) is a Russian former professional football player.

== Club career ==
He made his senior debut for PFC Spartak Nalchik on 20 September 2006 in a Russian Cup game against FC Sibir Novosibirsk.

== Personal life ==
He is a twin brother of Aslanbek Konov.
