= Sergei Shumeyko =

Retired Russian footballer

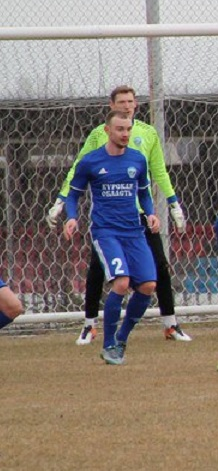
- Sergei Shumeyko in 2017.

Personal information
- Full name: Sergei Anatolyevich Shumeyko
- Date of birth: 17 February 1993 (age 33)
- Place of birth: Pochep, Russia
- Height: 1.78 m (5 ft 10 in)
- Position: Defender

Senior career*
Years	Team	Apps	(Gls)
2010–2012	Akademiya Togliatti	44	(0)
2013	Volga Ulyanovsk	9	(2)
2013–2014	Tyumen	23	(0)
2014–2015	SKA-Energiya Khabarovsk	2	(0)
2015–2016	Torpedo Moscow	25	(0)
2016	Riga	10	(0)
2017	Avangard Kursk	0	(0)
2017	Fakel Voronezh	15	(0)
2018	Zemplín Michalovce	3	(0)
- * Club domestic league appearances and goals

Sergei Anatolyevich Shumeyko (Russian: Серге́й Анатольевич Шумейко; born 17 February 1993) is a former Russian professional football player.

== Club career ==
He made his Russian Football National League debut for SKA-Energiya Khabarovsk on 24 August 2014 in a game against Sibir Novosibirsk.
