= Artyom Korzhunov =

Russian footballer

Personal information
- Full name: Artyom Igorevich Korzhunov
- Date of birth: 10 June 1995 (age 31)
- Place of birth: Blagoveshchensk, Russia
- Height: 1.80 m (5 ft 11 in)
- Position: Midfielder

Senior career*
Years	Team	Apps	(Gls)
2014	FC Amur-2010 Blagoveshchensk	8	(1)
2014–2016	FC Sibir-2 Novosibirsk	42	(5)
2016–2019	FC Sibir Novosibirsk	47	(4)
2019–2020	FC Chayka Peschanokopskoye	14	(0)
2020–2021	FC Novosibirsk	21	(2)
2021–2022	FC Dynamo Vladivostok	21	(6)
2022–2023	FC Forte Taganrog	24	(0)
2023–2024	FC Dynamo Kirov	35	(5)
2025	FC Spartak Tambov	10	(3)
- * Club domestic league appearances and goals as of 28 June 2025

Artyom Igorevich Korzhunov (Russian: Артём Игоревич Коржунов; born 10 June 1995) is a Russian football player.

== Club career ==
He made his professional debut in the Russian Professional Football League for FC Amur-2010 Blagoveshchensk on 22 April 2014 in a game against FC Sakhalin Yuzhno-Sakhalinsk.

He made his Russian Football National League debut for FC Sibir Novosibirsk on 3 September 2016 in a game against FC Shinnik Yaroslavl.
