= Anton Sereda =

Russian footballer

Personal information
- Full name: Anton Vladimirovich Sereda
- Date of birth: 18 January 1980 (age 46)
- Place of birth: Klintsy, Bryansk Oblast, Russian SFSR
- Height: 1.80 m (5 ft 11 in)
- Position: Midfielder

Youth career
- DYuSSh Unecha
- FC Rotor Volgograd

Senior career*
Years	Team	Apps	(Gls)
1996–1997	FC Rotor-d Volgograd	34	(4)
1998–2000	FC Rotor-2 Volgograd	52	(7)
2000	FC Torpedo-Viktoriya Nizhny Novgorod	17	(0)
2001	FC Metallurg-Metiznik Magnitogorsk	30	(6)
2002	FC Metallurg Lipetsk	3	(0)
2002–2008	FC Yelets	205	(46)
2009	FC Mordovia Saransk	12	(1)
2009	FC Metallurg Lipetsk	13	(0)
2010	FC Sheksna Cherepovets	15	(0)
2010	FC Yelets (amateur)		
2011–2016	FC Lokomotiv Liski	131	(21)
- * Club domestic league appearances and goals

Anton Vladimirovich Sereda (Russian: Антон Владимирович Середа; born 18 January 1980) is a Russian former professional football player.

== Club career ==
He played in the Russian Football National League for FC Metallurg Lipetsk in 2009.
