= Aleksei Khrushchyov =

Russian footballer

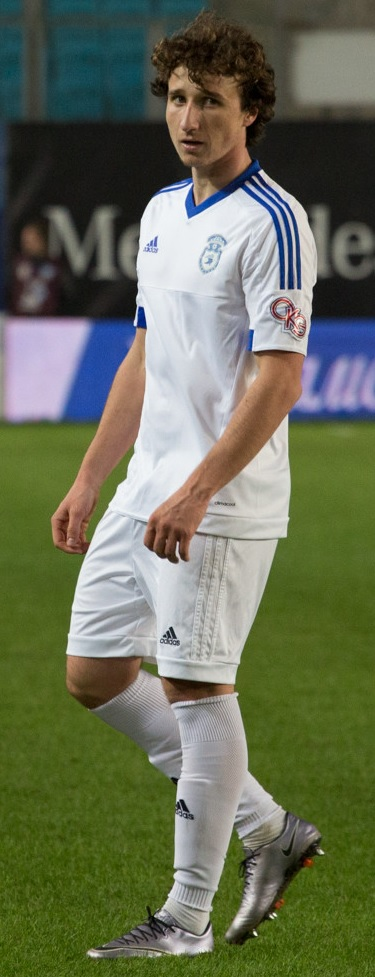
- Khrushchyov with Sokol Saratov in 2016

Personal information
- Full name: Aleksei Vladimirovich Khrushchyov
- Date of birth: 21 August 1992 (age 34)
- Place of birth: Oktyabrsk, Russia
- Height: 1.77 m (5 ft 10 in)
- Position: Midfielder

Senior career*
Years	Team	Apps	(Gls)
2010–2011	FC Krylia Sovetov Samara	0	(0)
2012	FC Syzran-2003	24	(5)
2013	FC Khimki	0	(0)
2013–2014	FC Syzran-2003	38	(5)
2015–2017	FC Yenisey Krasnoyarsk	27	(3)
2016–2017	→ FC Sokol Saratov (loan)	31	(0)
2017–2018	FC Syzran-2003	26	(0)
2019–2020	FC Kafa Feodosia	8	(0)
2021–2022	FC Kyzyltash Bakhchisaray		
- * Club domestic league appearances and goals

Aleksei Vladimirovich Khrushchyov (Russian: Алексей Владимирович Хрущев; born 21 August 1992) is a Russian former football midfielder.

== Club career ==
He made his debut in the Russian Second Division for FC Syzran-2003 on 17 April 2012 in a game against FC Oktan Perm.

He made his Russian Football National League debut for FC Yenisey Krasnoyarsk on 18 March 2015 in a game against FC Anzhi Makhachkala.
