= Arkady Simanov =

Russian footballer (born 1992)

Personal information
- Full name: Arkady Nikolayevich Simanov
- Date of birth: 7 March 1992 (age 34)
- Place of birth: Izhevsk, Russia
- Height: 1.69 m (5 ft 7 in)
- Position: Midfielder

Senior career*
| Years | Team | Apps | (Gls) |
| 2009–2010 | FC SOYUZ-Gazprom Izhevsk | 1 | (0) |
| 2011–2017 | FC Zenit-Izhevsk | 139 | (19) |
| 2017 | FC Olimpiyets Nizhny Novgorod | 0 | (0) |
| 2017 | FC Zenit-Izhevsk | 4 | (0) |
| 2018–2019 | FC Nizhny Novgorod | 34 | (2) |
| 2019 | FC Luch Vladivostok | 5 | (0) |
| 2020 | FC Tyumen | 7 | (0) |
| 2021 | FC Zenit-Izhevsk | 12 | (1) |
| 2021–2022 | FC Saransk | 31 | (0) |
| 2022–2023 | FC Zenit-Izhevsk | 24 | (2) |
| 2023 | FC Dynamo Kirov | 14 | (0) |
| 2024 | FC Uralets-TS Nizhny Tagil | 20 | (1) |
- * Club domestic league appearances and goals as of 19 October 2024

Arkady Nikolayevich Simanov (Russian: Аркадий Николаевич Симанов; born 7 March 1992) is a Russian professional association football player.

== Club career ==
He made his Russian Football National League debut for FC Olimpiyets Nizhny Novgorod on 11 April 2018 in a game against FC Yenisey Krasnoyarsk.
