= Maksim Filippov =

Russian footballer

- Максим Валерьевич Филиппов
- Born: 15 February 1984; Magnitogorsk, Chelyabinsk Oblast, Russian SFSR
- Died: 31 March 2024 (aged 40); Ukraine
- Known for: Association football career
Association football career
- Full name: Maksim Valeryevich Filippov
- Height: 1.93 m (6 ft 4 in)
- Position: Forward
Youth career
- DYuSSh-4 Magnitogorsk
Senior career*
Years	Team	Apps	(Gls)
2001–2002	FC Metallurg-Metiznik Magnitogorsk	40	(0)
2003–2005	FC Amkar Perm	8	(0)
2006	FC Alnas Almetyevsk	21	(5)
2007	FC Tekstilshchik-Telekom Ivanovo	23	(3)
2007	FC Mordovia Saransk	13	(3)
2008	FC Metallurg-Kuzbass Novokuznetsk	34	(6)
2009	FC Fakel Voronezh	17	(3)
2009	FC Gazovik Orenburg	5	(0)
2010	FC Oktan Perm (amateur)		
2011–2013	FC Amur-2010 Blagoveshchensk	53	(8)
2013	FC Chita	15	(0)
2014	FC Oktan Perm	9	(2)
2014	FC Biolog Novokubansk	12	(0)
2015	FC Belogorsk		
2016	FC SDYuSShOR po Futbolu Perm		
- * Club domestic league appearances and goals
- Military career
- Allegiance: Russia
- Branch: Volunteer Branch
- Rank: Private
- War: Russo-Ukrainian war †

Maksim Valeryevich Filippov (Russian: Максим Валерьевич Филиппов; born 15 February 1984, died 31 March 2024) was a Russian professional football player.

Mediazona's Russia 200 project reported that he died in Russian's war against Ukraine in 2024.

== See also ==
- Maxim Nikolaevich Filippov (born 1982) – another Russian footballer
