= Aleksandr Bolonin =

Russian professional football player

Personal information
- Full name: Aleksandr Nikolayevich Bolonin
- Date of birth: 4 March 1991 (age 35)
- Place of birth: Astrakhan, Russian SFSR
- Height: 1.70 m (5 ft 7 in)
- Position: Midfielder

Team information
- Current team: SC Astrakhan
- Number: 11

Senior career*
Years	Team	Apps	(Gls)
2010	FC Volgar-Gazprom-2-D Astrakhan		
2010–2014	FC Astrakhan	100	(22)
2014	FC Fakel Voronezh	13	(0)
2015	FC Astrakhan	11	(2)
2015–2024	FC Volgar Astrakhan	147	(19)
2024–	SC Astrakhan	67	(6)
- * Club domestic league appearances and goals as of 31 October 2026

Aleksandr Nikolayevich Bolonin (Russian: Александр Николаевич Болонин; born 4 March 1991) is a Russian professional football player who plays for SC Astrakhan.

== Club career ==
He made his Russian Football National League debut for FC Volgar Astrakhan on 11 July 2015 in a game against FC Sibir Novosibirsk.
