= Pavel Tomilin =

Russian footballer

Personal information
- Full name: Pavel Petrovich Tomilin
- Date of birth: 7 November 1985 (age 41)
- Place of birth: Saransk, Russian SFSR
- Height: 1.77 m (5 ft 9 1/2 in)
- Position: Defender

Senior career*
Years	Team	Apps	(Gls)
2004–2005	FC Mordovia Saransk	26	(1)
2007–2008	FC Zenit Penza	61	(6)
2009	FC Zenit Penza (amateur)		
2010–2013	FC Zenit Penza	81	(3)
2013–2014	FC Tambov	20	(2)
2014–2015	FC Metallurg Lipetsk	24	(0)
2015–2016	FC Dynamo Bryansk	20	(0)
- * Club domestic league appearances and goals

Pavel Petrovich Tomilin (Russian: Павел Петрович Томилин; born 7 November 1985) is a former Russian professional football player.

== Club career ==
He played in the Russian Football National League for FC Mordovia Saransk in 2004.
