= Sergei Chernyshov (footballer, born 1984) =

Russian professional footballer

Personal information
- Full name: Sergei Sergeyevich Chernyshov
- Date of birth: 27 July 1984 (age 42)
- Place of birth: Yelets, Russian SFSR
- Height: 1.82 m (6 ft 0 in)
- Position: Forward

Senior career*
Years	Team	Apps	(Gls)
2004–2008	FC Yelets	59	(2)
2008	FC Dynamo Saint Petersburg	11	(0)
2009	FC Novgorod		
2010	FC Yelets (amateur)		
2011–2014	FC Metallurg Lipetsk	74	(11)
2014–2016	FC Lokomotiv Liski	51	(14)
2016	FC Khimki	15	(1)
2017	FC Torpedo Moscow	8	(5)
2017–2021	FC Metallurg Lipetsk	77	(11)
- * Club domestic league appearances and goals

Sergei Sergeyevich Chernyshov (Russian: Серге́й Серге́евич Чернышов; born 27 July 1984) is a Russian former professional footballer who played as a forward.

== Club career ==
He made his Russian Football National League debut for FC Khimki on 16 July 2016 in a game against FC Tambov.
