= Igor Chernyshov (footballer) =

Russian professional footballer

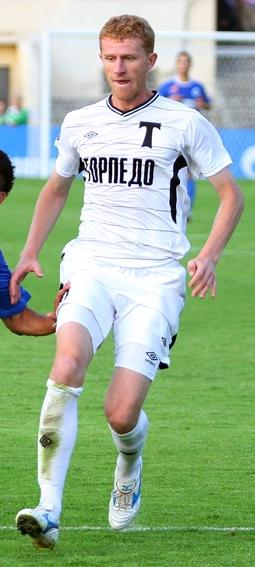
- Chernyshov with Torpedo Moscow in 2011

Personal information
- Full name: Igor Aleksandrovich Chernyshov
- Date of birth: 26 June 1984 (age 42)
- Place of birth: Luzhny, Russian SFSR
- Height: 1.88 m (6 ft 2 in)
- Position: Centre back

Youth career
- DYuSSh Stavropol

Senior career*
Years	Team	Apps	(Gls)
2003–2004	FC Uralan Elista	11	(0)
2004–2005	FC Rostov	1	(0)
2006–2007	FC SKA Rostov-on-Don	52	(1)
2008	FC Metallurg-Kuzbass Novokuznetsk	41	(3)
2009	FC Volgar-Gazprom-2 Astrakhan	10	(0)
2009	FC Stavropol	12	(1)
2010	FC Irtysh Omsk	33	(5)
2011–2012	FC Torpedo Moscow	39	(4)
2012–2013	PFC Spartak Nalchik	11	(0)
2013	FC Sokol Saratov	17	(1)
2014–2017	FC Khimki	82	(13)
2017	FC Dynamo Saint Petersburg	4	(1)
2017	FC Sokol Saratov	12	(0)
2018–2021	PFC Dynamo Stavropol	84	(15)

International career
2005	Russia U-21	1	(0)
- * Club domestic league appearances and goals

Igor Aleksandrovich Chernyshov (Russian: Игорь Александрович Чернышов; born 26 June 1984) is a Russian former professional footballer.

== Club career ==
He made his debut in the Russian Premier League for FC Rostov on 23 July 2005 in a game against FC Shinnik Yaroslavl.
