= Anton Antipov =

Russian professional football player

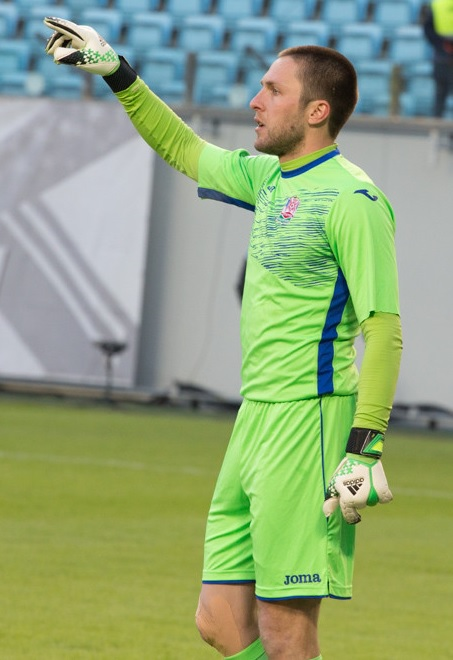
- Antipov with Spartak Nalchik in 2017

Personal information
- Full name: Anton Valeryevich Antipov
- Date of birth: 20 April 1990 (age 36)
- Place of birth: Nalchik, Russian SFSR
- Height: 1.82 m (6 ft 0 in)
- Position: Goalkeeper

Senior career*
Years	Team	Apps	(Gls)
2008–2010	PFC Spartak Nalchik	0	(0)
2010	FC Druzhba Maykop	7	(0)
2011	PFC Spartak Nalchik	0	(0)
2011–2015	FC Mashuk-KMV Pyatigorsk	44	(0)
2015–2017	PFC Spartak Nalchik	65	(0)
2018	FC Chayka Peschanokopskoye	4	(0)
2018–2020	FC Avangard Kursk	0	(0)
2020–2022	PFC Spartak Nalchik	52	(0)
- * Club domestic league appearances and goals

Anton Valeryevich Antipov (Russian: Антон Валерьевич Антипов; born 20 April 1990) is a Russian former professional football player.

== Career ==
Antipov made his professional debut for PFC Spartak Nalchik on 17 July 2011 in the Russian Cup game against FC Torpedo Vladimir. He made his Russian Football National League debut for Spartak Nalchik on 11 July 2016 in a game against FC Kuban Krasnodar.
