= Andrei Kuznetsov (footballer) =

Russian footballer

Personal information
- Full name: Andrei Borisovich Kuznetsov
- Date of birth: 9 January 1988 (age 38)
- Place of birth: Ulyanovsk, Russian SFSR
- Height: 1.75 m (5 ft 9 in)
- Positions: Defender; midfielder

Senior career*
Years	Team	Apps	(Gls)
2005–2009	FC Lokomotiv Moscow	0	(0)
2008	→ FC Zvezda Irkutsk (loan)	35	(0)
2009	→ FC Sibir Novosibirsk (loan)	2	(0)
2010–2012	FC Lokomotiv-2 Moscow	89	(1)
2012–2013	FC Khimki	19	(1)
2014	FC Volga Ulyanovsk	9	(0)
2014	FC Avangard Kursk	19	(0)
2015–2017	PFC Spartak Nalchik	63	(2)
2017	FC Rotor Volgograd	5	(0)
2018	FC Tyumen	11	(0)
2018–2019	FC Volga Ulyanovsk	21	(0)
2019–2020	FC Murom	14	(0)

International career
2006	Russia U18	9	(1)
2007	Russia U19	7	(0)
- * Club domestic league appearances and goals

Andrei Borisovich Kuznetsov (Russian: Андрей Борисович Кузнецов; born 9 January 1988) is a Russian former professional footballer.

== Club career ==
He made his professional debut in the Russian Football National League in 2008 for FC Zvezda Irkutsk. He played one game in the UEFA Cup 2007–08 for FC Lokomotiv Moscow on 5 December 2007 against Panathinaikos.
