= Maksim Shirokov =

Russian footballer

Personal information
- Full name: Maksim Andreyevich Shirokov
- Date of birth: 26 March 1994 (age 32)
- Place of birth: Moscow, Russia
- Height: 1.74 m (5 ft 9 in)
- Positions: Forward; midfielder

Youth career
- FC Lokomotiv Moscow

Senior career*
Years	Team	Apps	(Gls)
2011–2014	FC Oryol	37	(6)
2014–2017	FC Khimki	45	(4)
2017–2018	FC Torpedo Moscow	6	(0)
2018–2021	FC Saturn Ramenskoye	65	(18)
2021–2022	FC Zvezda Perm	26	(5)
2022–2023	FC Spartak Kostroma	20	(1)
- * Club domestic league appearances and goals

Maksim Andreyevich Shirokov (Russian: Максим Андреевич Широков; born 26 March 1994) is a Russian former professional football forward.

== Club career ==
He made his debut in the Russian Second Division for FC Rusichi Oryol on 23 May 2012 in a game against FC Spartak Tambov.

He made his Russian Football National League debut for FC Khimki on 21 August 2016 in a game against FC Sokol Saratov.
