= Andrei Mayboroda =

Russian footballer

Personal information
- Full name: Andrei Sergeyevich Mayboroda
- Date of birth: 20 September 1984 (age 42)
- Place of birth: Krasnoyarsk, Russian SFSR
- Height: 1.90 m (6 ft 3 in)
- Position: Defender

Youth career
- DYuSSh-2 Krasnoyarsk

Senior career*
Years	Team	Apps	(Gls)
2007	FC Zarya Leninsk-Kuznetsky	12	(0)
2008	FC Krasnodar	0	(0)
2008–2010	FC Metallurg-Yenisey Krasnoyarsk	49	(2)
2011–2013	FC Dynamo Barnaul	50	(3)
2013–2016	FC Baikal Irkutsk	61	(0)
- * Club domestic league appearances and goals

Andrei Sergeyevich Mayboroda (Russian: Андрей Серге́евич Майборода; born 20 September 1984) is a former Russian professional football player.

== Club career ==
He played in the Russian Football National League for FC Baikal Irkutsk in the 2015–16 season.
