= FC Afips Afipsky =

- Full name: Football Club Afips Afipsky
- Founded: 2012
- Dissolved: 2018
- Ground: Andrei-Arena
- Capacity: 3,000
- League: PFL, Zone South
- 2017–18: 2nd

FC Afips Afipsky (Russian: ФК "Афипс" Афипский) was a Russian football team based in Afipsky. It was founded in 2012. In 2014–15 season, it advanced to the professional level, the third-tier Russian Professional Football League.

On 18 June 2018 it was announced that FC Afips is dissolved because of financial problems.
