= FC Domodedovo Moscow =

- Full name: Football Club Domodedovo Moscow
- Founded: 2013
- Dissolved: 2017
- Ground: Avangard Stadium
- Capacity: 6,000
- Owner: Mosoblstroytrest #11, Yuri Yeryomin, Dmitri Kombarov, Kirill Kombarov
- 2016–17: PFL, Zone West, 8th
Home colours	Away colours

FC Domodedovo Moscow (Russian: ФК «Домодедово» Москва) was a Russian football team based in Domodedovo and officially registered in Moscow. It was founded in 2013 by twin player brothers Dmitri Kombarov and Kirill Kombarov. In 2014–15 season, it advanced to the professional level, the third-tier Russian Professional Football League. The club was dissolved following the 2016–17 season.
