= FC Khimik Dzerzhinsk =

- Full name: Football Club Khimik Dzerzhinsk
- Nickname: «Dust» (Russian: «Дуст»)
- Founded: 1946; 80 years ago
- Ground: Khimik
- Capacity: 5,266
- Chairman: Andrey Kuvaev
- Manager: Andrey Blazhko
- League: Russian Second League, Division A, Silver Group
- 2026: Division B, Group 4, 1st (promoted)
- Website: fc-khimik.ru
Home colours	Away colours

FC Khimik Dzerzhinsk (Russian: ФК «Химик» Дзержинск) is an association football club from Dzerzhinsk, Russia, founded in 1946. It played in the Soviet First League and the Russian First League (second level) from 1947 to 1949, from 1960 to 1962 and from 2013–14 to 2014–15. It was dissolved after the 2015–16 season. Before the 2021–22 season, it was licensed for the Russian Second League, the third tier of Russian football, once again. In the 2023 Russian Second League Division B, Khimik won their zone and earned promotion to the third-tier Division A. It was relegated back to Division B after one season.

== Current squad ==
As of 13 September 2026, according to the Second League website.

Note: Flags indicate national team as defined under FIFA eligibility rules; some limited exceptions apply. Players may hold more than one non-FIFA nationality.

No.	Pos.	Nation	Player
1	GK	RUS	Stepan Masalskikh
5	DF	RUS	Artyom Shirokov
6	DF	RUS	Semyon Kudryashov
7	FW	RUS	Nikita Abramushkin
8	MF	RUS	Vyacheslav Zinkov
9	FW	RUS	Roman Izotov
10	MF	RUS	Daniil Knyazev
11	MF	RUS	Ivan Breslavtsev (on loan from Pari NN)
13	DF	RUS	Andrey Savinov
16	GK	RUS	Roman Rayfegerste
17	MF	RUS	Anton Uboniyev
19	MF	RUS	Kirill Gordeyev
20	GK	RUS	Andrey Potekhin
23	FW	RUS	Nikita Nikiforov

No.	Pos.	Nation	Player
25	MF	RUS	Gleb Ovchinnikov
26	DF	RUS	Aleksey Dolya
33	DF	RUS	Kirill Myrzakov
36	FW	RUS	Ilya Gruznov
48	MF	RUS	Ivan Sutugin
57	GK	RUS	Nikita Shulkin
65	DF	RUS	Aleksandr Goryachkin
66	MF	RUS	Dmitry Veber
77	MF	RUS	Daniil Zuyev
80	FW	RUS	Yegor Zhebryakov
83	DF	RUS	Ruslan Gavrilov
88	MF	RUS	Denis Rogov
96	MF	RUS	Andrey Tolchanov
97	MF	RUS	Daniil Oganichev

== Team name history ==
- 1946: FC Azot Dzerzhinsk
- 1947–1948: FC Khimik Dzerzhinsk
- 1949–1959: FC Zavod im. Sverdlova Dzerzhinsk
- 1960–1961: FC Zarya Dzerzhinsk
- 1962–1963: FC Volna Dzerzhinsk
- 1964–2000: FC Khimik Dzerzhinsk
- 2001–2002: FC Sibur-Khimik Dzerzhinsk
- 2003–: FC Khimik Dzerzhinsk
