= FC Angusht Nazran =

Russian football club

Angusht
- Full name: Football Club; Angusht Nazran
- Founded: 1993; 33 years ago 2007; 19 years ago (refounded)
- Ground: Rashid Aushev; Central Stadium, Nazran
- Capacity: 3,200
- Chairman: Beslan Iliyev
- Manager: Umar Markhiyev
- League: Russian Second League, Division B, Group 1
- 2026: 13th
- Website: ano-angusht.ru
Home colours	Away colours

FC Angusht Nazran (Russian: «Ангушт» Назрань) is a Russian association football club based in Nazran, Republic of Ingushetia.

== History ==
The club was founded in 1993 as Ingushetia Nazran and entered the Russian Third League in 1994. In 1995 the club was renamed Angusht and finished second in their zone, securing promotion to the Second League (they were playing in Malgobek that season). Angusht finished second in 1998 and third in 2000, and in 2005 they managed to win their Second Division zone to get another promotion. The club spent the 2006 season in the First Division, finishing last between 22 teams. After the season Angusht went bankrupt, were renamed FC Nazran (and shortly after that FC Ongusht Nazran) and joined the Amateur Football League. In 2009 it was renamed back to Angusht. It was promoted to the second-level (now called Russian National Football League) for the 2013–14 season, but were again relegated after just one season on that level.

They were denied professional license for the 2019–20 season due to accumulated debts.

On 21 February 2024, Angusht was licensed for the 2024 season of the Second League Division B.

== Current squad ==
As of 11 September 2026, according to the Second League website.

Note: Flags indicate national team as defined under FIFA eligibility rules; some limited exceptions apply. Players may hold more than one non-FIFA nationality.

No.	Pos.	Nation	Player
1	GK	RUS	Gelani Khashtyrov
3	DF	RUS	Ilya Kirilenko
4	DF	RUS	Aman Babakhanov
5	DF	RUS	Matvey Agasyan
6	MF	RUS	Bek Tsuroyev
7	FW	RUS	Bekkhan Aliyev
8	MF	RUS	Aliskhan Akhilgov
9	FW	RUS	Aslan Aushev
11	MF	RUS	Mukhammad Khalibegov (on loan from Mashuk-KMV)
17	FW	RUS	Ramazan Ibragimov
18	DF	RUS	Abu-Muslim Khamkhoyev

No.	Pos.	Nation	Player
20	MF	RUS	Kalimolla Zaynavov
21	MF	RUS	Rashid Yevloyev
27	MF	RUS	Suleym Gazdiyev
30	GK	RUS	Muslim Temerbiyev
60	DF	RUS	Akhyad Garisultanov
70	MF	RUS	Tukhan Akhilgov
77	FW	RUS	Ruslan Tutayev
80	MF	RUS	Khalit Ozdoyev
95	DF	RUS	Akhmed Abubakarov
97	GK	RUS	Abdullakh Dorsigov
