= 2009 FC Rostov season =

FC Rostov
2009 season
- Chairman: Leonid Kovalyov
- Manager: Oleg Dolmatov
- Stadium: Olimp-2
- Russian Premier League: 14th
- 2009–10 Russian Cup: Last 32 vs Avangard Podolsk
- Top goalscorer: League: Two Players (6); All: Two Players (6)
- Highest home attendance: 16,500 vs Zenit St.Petersburg (3 May 2009)
- Lowest home attendance: 7,125 vs Moscow (3 October 2009)

The 2009 FC Rostov season was the club's first season back in the Russian Premier League, the highest tier of football in Russia, following their relegation at the end of the 2007 season.

== Season events ==
=== New Contracts ===
On 1 October, Dušan Anđelković signed a new three-year contract with Rostov.

== Squad ==
As of match played 29 November 2009

| No. | Name | Nationality | Position | Date of birth (age) | Signed from | Signed in | Contract ends | Apps. | Goals |
Goalkeepers
| 1 | Roman Gerus | (Russia) | GK | 14 September 1980 (aged 29) | Luch-Energiya Vladivostok | 2007 | | | |
| 16 | Veniamin Mandrykin | (Russia) | GK | 30 August 1981 (aged 28) | loan from CSKA Moscow | 2009 | 2009 | 10 | 0 |
| 27 | Stanislav Khoteyev | (Russia) | GK | 7 March 1981 (aged 28) | Lobnya | 2008 | | | |
| 31 | Aleksandr Solovyov | (Russia) | GK | 16 February 1991 (aged 18) | Youth Team | 2009 | | 0 | 0 |
| 44 | Artyom Nazarov | (Russia) | GK | 19 February 1991 (aged 18) | Youth Team | 2009 | | 0 | 0 |
| 56 | Vladimir Zabuga | (Russia) | GK | 8 July 1990 (aged 19) | Abinsk | 2009 | | 0 | 0 |
Defenders
| 3 | Dušan Anđelković | (Serbia) | DF | 15 June 1982 (aged 27) | Kocaelispor | 2009 | 2012 | 26 | 0 |
| 5 | Aleksandr Cherkes | (Russia) | DF | 2 September 1976 (aged 33) | Shinnik Yaroslavl | 2008 | 2010 | | |
| 6 | Roman Lengyel | (Czech Republic) | DF | 3 November 1978 (aged 31) | Kuban Krasnodar | 2009 | 2010 | 28 | 0 |
| 26 | Ivan Živanović | (Serbia) | DF | 10 December 1981 (aged 27) | Sampdoria | 2008 | | | |
| 32 | Vladislav Dubovoy | (Russia) | DF | 5 January 1989 (aged 20) | Nika Krasny Sulin | 2009 | | 0 | 0 |
| 34 | Oleg Leshchikov | (Russia) | DF | 29 September 1989 (aged 20) | Nika Krasny Sulin | 2009 | | 0 | 0 |
| 35 | Vasili Mironik | (Russia) | DF | 12 September 1991 (aged 18) | Youth Team | 2009 | | 0 | 0 |
| 38 | Vladimir Shamara | (Russia) | DF | 14 February 1992 (aged 17) | Youth Team | 2009 | | 0 | 0 |
| 46 | Alexandr Vasilyev | (Russia) | DF | 20 July 1990 (aged 19) | Youth Team | 2009 | | 0 | 0 |
| 47 | Henry Hagba | (Russia) | DF | 7 January 1992 (aged 17) | Youth Team | 2009 | | 0 | 0 |
| 49 | Aleksei Sizintsev | (Russia) | DF | 18 June 1991 (aged 18) | Youth Team | 2009 | | 0 | 0 |
| 54 | Ivan Lapin | (Russia) | DF | 8 May 1988 (aged 21) | loan from Zenit St.Petersburg | 2009 | | 3 | 0 |
| 57 | Astemir Sheriyev | (Russia) | DF | 23 February 1990 (aged 19) | Spartak Nalchik | 2009 | | 9 | 0 |
| 58 | Aleksei Klubkov | (Russia) | DF | 26 March 1990 (aged 19) | Spartak-2 Moscow | 2009 | | 0 | 0 |
| 59 | Taymuraz Kozayev | (Russia) | DF | 26 January 1991 (aged 18) | Alania-2 Vladikavkaz | 2009 | | 0 | 0 |
| 62 | Kirill Chekmaryov | (Russia) | DF | 5 February 1990 (aged 19) | Master-Saturn Yegoryevsk | 2009 | | 0 | 0 |
| 83 | Mikhail Rozhkov | (Russia) | DF | 27 December 1983 (aged 25) | Nosta Novotroitsk | 2009 | 2009 | 19 | 0 |
Midfielders
| 7 | Alyaksandr Kulchy | (Belarus) | MF | 1 November 1973 (aged 36) | Tom Tomsk | 2008 | | | |
| 8 | Maksim Astafyev | (Russia) | MF | 8 December 1982 (aged 26) | Luch-Energiya Vladivostok | 2008 | | | |
| 10 | Mikhail Osinov | (Russia) | MF | 8 October 1975 (aged 34) | Rotor Volgograd | 2001 | | | |
| 12 | Pyotr Gitselov | (Russia) | MF | 18 July 1983 (aged 26) | loan from Rubin Kazan | 2009 | | 7 | 0 |
| 18 | Branimir Petrović | (Serbia) | MF | 26 June 1982 (aged 27) | KAMAZ | 2009 | 2011 | 23 | 2 |
| 20 | Artur Valikayev | (Russia) | MF | 8 January 1988 (aged 21) | Nizhny Novgorod | 2009 | | 6 | 0 |
| 24 | Sergey Kuznetsov | (Russia) | MF | 7 May 1986 (aged 23) | Lokomotiv Moscow | 2009 | | 7 | 1 |
| 25 | Aleksandr Pavlenko | (Russia) | MF | 20 January 1985 (aged 24) | loan from Spartak Moscow | 2009 | | 9 | 3 |
| 40 | Maxim Kalmykov | (Russia) | MF | 31 July 1991 (aged 18) | Youth Team | 2009 | | 0 | 0 |
| 42 | Yevgeni Matrakhov | (Russia) | MF | 10 August 1990 (aged 19) | Zenit-2 St.Petersburg | 2009 | | 0 | 0 |
| 45 | Ilya Bannov | (Russia) | MF | 17 June 1989 (aged 20) | Zenit-2 St.Petersburg | 2009 | | 0 | 0 |
| 48 | Maksim Levchenko | (Russia) | MF | 29 April 1992 (aged 17) | Youth Team | 2009 | | 0 | 0 |
| 52 | Artyom Syomka | (Russia) | MF | 17 July 1990 (aged 19) | Zenit-2 St.Petersburg | 2009 | | 0 | 0 |
| 63 | Andrei Lyakh | (Russia) | MF | 24 September 1990 (aged 19) | Khimik Dzerzhinsk | 2009 | | 0 | 0 |
| 84 | Alexandru Gațcan | (Moldova) | MF | 27 March 1984 (aged 25) | Rubin Kazan | 2008 | | | |
| 85 | Nenad Šljivić | (Serbia) | MF | 8 June 1985 (aged 24) | Napredak Kruševac | 2008 | | | |
Forwards
| 4 | Igor Lebedenko | (Russia) | FW | 27 May 1983 (aged 26) | Saturn Ramenskoye | 2009 | 2009 | 30 | 4 |
| 9 | Dmitri Akimov | (Russia) | FW | 14 September 1980 (aged 29) | Sibir Novosibirsk | 2008 | | | |
| 19 | Mersudin Ahmetović | (Bosnia and Herzegovina) | FW | 19 March 1985 (aged 24) | Sloboda Tuzla | 2008 | | | |
| 21 | Hong Yong-jo | (North Korea) | FW | 22 May 1982 (aged 27) | Bežanija | 2008 | | | |
| 36 | Magomed Kurbanov | (Azerbaijan) | FW | 11 April 1992 (aged 17) | Youth Team | 2009 | | 0 | 0 |
| 37 | Sergey Chernyshev | (Russia) | FW | 27 April 1990 (aged 19) | Youth Team | 2007 | | | |
| 43 | Mikhail Ignatov | (Russia) | FW | 17 November 1989 (aged 20) | Zenit-2 St.Petersburg | 2009 | | 0 | 0 |
| 50 | Vitali Kirichenko | (Russia) | FW | 24 August 1989 (aged 20) | Mashuk-KMV | 2009 | | 0 | 0 |
| 55 | Aleksei Sugak | (Russia) | FW | 27 February 1990 (aged 19) | Youth Team | 2009 | | 0 | 0 |
| 60 | Dmitri Kortava | (Russia) | FW | 17 November 1990 (aged 19) | Torpedo Moscow | 2009 | | 0 | 0 |
| 87 | Yevgeni Lutsenko | (Russia) | FW | 25 February 1987 (aged 22) | Stavropolye-2009 | 2009 | | 6 | 0 |
| 88 | Aleksandr Salugin | (Russia) | FW | 23 October 1988 (aged 21) | loan from Krylia Sovetov | 2009 | | 6 | 0 |
Out on loan
Left during the season
| 14 | Aleksandr Ponomaryov | (Russia) | DF | 25 January 1986 (aged 23) | Torpedo Moscow | 2009 | | 1 | 0 |
| 51 | Andrei Sklyarov | (Russia) | DF | 30 September 1989 (aged 20) | TP-47 | 2009 | | 1 | 0 |

=== Out on loan ===
Note: Flags indicate national team as defined under FIFA eligibility rules; some limited exceptions apply. Players may hold more than one non-FIFA nationality.

| No. | Pos. | Nation | Player |
|---|---|---|---|
| — | DF | RUS | Ildar Shabayev (at Vityaz Podolsk) |
| — | MF | RUS | Denis Kirilenko (at Stavropolye-2009) |
| — | DF | RUS | Mikhail Kozlov (at Vityaz Podolsk) |
| — | DF | RUS | Oleg Misyura (at Taganrog) |

| No. | Pos. | Nation | Player |
|---|---|---|---|
| — | DF | RUS | Yakov Ehrlich (at Volgograd) |
| — | DF | RUS | Ruslan Gurbanov (at Taganrog) |
| — | DF | RUS | Artyom Serdyuk (at Taganrog) |
| — | DF | RUS | Denis Kirilenko (at Volga Tver) |

== Transfers ==
=== In ===
| Date | Position | Nationality | Name | From | Fee | Ref. |
|---|---|---|---|---|---|---|
| 17 December 2008 | DF | (Czech Republic) | Roman Lengyel | Kuban Krasnodar | Undisclosed | |
| 18 February 2009 | DF | (Serbia) | Dušan Anđelković | Kocaelispor | Undisclosed | |
| 18 February 2009 | FW | (Russia) | Igor Lebedenko | Saturn Ramenskoye | Undisclosed | |
| 9 March 2009 | DF | (Russia) | Mikhail Rozhkov | Nosta Novotroitsk | Undisclosed | |
| 9 March 2009 | MF | (Serbia) | Branimir Petrović | KAMAZ | Undisclosed | |
| Winter 2009 | DF | (Russia) | Andrei Sklyarov | TP-47 | Undisclosed | |
| Winter 2009 | MF | (Russia) | Sergey Kuznetsov | Lokomotiv Moscow | Undisclosed | |
| 1 August 2009 | GK | (Russia) | Vladimir Zabuga | Abinsk | Undisclosed | |
| 1 August 2009 | FW | (Russia) | Yevgeni Lutsenko | Stavropolye-2009 | Undisclosed | |
| 28 August 2009 | DF | (Russia) | Kirill Chekmaryov | Master-Saturn Yegoryevsk | Undisclosed | |
| 28 August 2009 | DF | (Russia) | Aleksei Klubkov | Spartak-2 Moscow | Undisclosed | |
| 28 August 2009 | DF | (Russia) | Taymuraz Kozayev | Alania-2 Vladikavkaz | Undisclosed | |
| 28 August 2009 | MF | (Russia) | Andrei Lyakh | Khimik Dzerzhinsk | Undisclosed | |
| 28 August 2009 | MF | (Russia) | Artur Valikayev | Nizhny Novgorod | Undisclosed | |
| 28 August 2009 | FW | (Russia) | Dmitri Kortava | Torpedo Moscow | Undisclosed | |

=== Loans in ===
| Date from | Position | Nationality | Name | From | Date to | Ref. |
|---|---|---|---|---|---|---|
| 9 March 2009 | GK | (Russia) | Veniamin Mandrykin | CSKA Moscow | End of Season | |
| 1 August 2009 | FW | (Russia) | Aleksandr Salugin | Krylia Sovetov | End of Season | |
| 28 August 2009 | FW | (Russia) | Aleksandr Pavlenko | Spartak Moscow | Winter 2011 | |
| Winter 2009 | DF | (Russia) | Ivan Lapin | Zenit St.Petersburg | Winter 2010 | |

=== Loans out ===
| Date from | Position | Nationality | Name | To | Date to | Ref. |
|---|---|---|---|---|---|---|
| Winter 2009 | DF | (Russia) | Ildar Shabayev | Vityaz Podolsk | Winter 2010 | |
| Winter 2009 | MF | (Russia) | Denis Kirilenko | Stavropolye-2009 | Summer 2009 | |
| Winter 2009 | MF | (Russia) | Mikhail Kozlov | Vityaz Podolsk | Winter 2010 | |
| Winter 2009 | MF | (Russia) | Oleg Misyura | Taganrog | Winter 2010 | |
| Winter 2009 | FW | (Russia) | Yakov Ehrlich | Volgograd | Winter 2010 | |
| Winter 2009 | FW | (Russia) | Ruslan Gurbanov | Taganrog | Winter 2010 | |
| Winter 2009 | FW | (Russia) | Artyom Serdyuk | Taganrog | Winter 2010 | |
| Summer 2009 | MF | (Russia) | Denis Kirilenko | Volga Tver | Winter 2010 | |

=== Released ===
| Date | Position | Nationality | Name | Joined | Date | Ref. |
|---|---|---|---|---|---|---|
| Winter 2009 | GK | (Ukraine) | Maksym Levytskyi | Torpedo-ZIL Moscow | Winter 2009 | |
| Winter 2009 | DF | (Belarus) | Syarhey Shtanyuk | Alania Vladikavkaz | Winter 2009 | |
| Winter 2009 | DF | (Russia) | Pavel Mogilevskiy | Volga Nizhny Novgorod | Winter 2009 | |
| Winter 2009 | DF | (Russia) | Anton Rogochiy | Vityaz Podolsk | Winter 2009 | |
| Winter 2009 | MF | (Russia) | Konstantin Zuyev | Anzhi Makhachkala | Winter 2009 | |
| Winter 2009 | FW | (Russia) | Dmitri Burmistrov | Salyut-Energia Belgorod | Winter 2009 | |

=== Trial ===
| Date from | Position | Nationality | Name | Last club | Date to | Ref. |
|---|---|---|---|---|---|---|
| 12 January 2009 | DF | (Russia) | Andrei Ushenin | Shinnik Yaroslavl | | |
| 6 February 2009 | DF | (Senegal) | Ibra Kébé | Anzhi Makhachkala | | |
| 23 February 2009 | GK | (Russia) | Veniamin Mandrykin | CSKA Moscow | | |
| 23 February 2009 | DF | (Russia) | Mikhail Rozhkov | Nosta Novotroitsk | | |
| 23 February 2009 | DF | (Ukraine) | Dmytro Semochko | Shinnik Yaroslavl | | |

== Competitions ==
=== Overview ===
| Competition | First match | Last match | Starting round | Final position | Record | | | | | | | |
| Competition | First match | Last match | Starting round | Final position | Pld | W | D | L | GF | GA | GD | Win % |
|---|---|---|---|---|---|---|---|---|---|---|---|---|
| Premier League | 14 March 2009 | 29 November 2009 | Matchday 1 | 14th | 30 | 7 | 11 | 12 | 28 | 39 | −11 | 23.33 |
| Russian Cup | 15 July 2009 | 15 July 2009 | Last 32 | Last 32 | 1 | 0 | 0 | 1 | 2 | 4 | −2 | 0.00 |
| Total | | | | | 31 | 7 | 11 | 13 | 30 | 43 | −13 | 22.58 |

Last updated: 29 November 2009
Source: See Results

=== Premier League ===
==== Results by round ====
| Round | 1 | 2 | 3 | 4 | 5 | 6 | 7 | 8 | 9 | 10 | 11 | 12 | 13 | 14 | 15 | 16 | 17 | 18 | 19 | 20 | 21 | 22 | 23 | 24 | 25 | 26 | 27 | 28 | 29 | 30 |
|---|---|---|---|---|---|---|---|---|---|---|---|---|---|---|---|---|---|---|---|---|---|---|---|---|---|---|---|---|---|---|
| Ground | A | H | A | A | H | A | H | A | H | A | H | A | H | A | H | A | H | H | A | H | A | H | A | H | A | H | A | H | A | H |
| Result | D | D | W | L | D | W | W | D | D | L | D | W | L | L | D | L | W | L | D | W | L | D | L | D | W | L | L | L | L | D |

Updated to match(es) played on 29 November 2009. Source: See Results
A = Away; H = Home; W = Win; D = Draw; L = Loss

==== Results ====
| 14 March 2009 1 | Amkar Perm | 0 – 0 | Rostov | Perm |
| 12:00 MSK (UTC+4) | Sirakov (yellow card) 25' (yellow-red card) 48'; Belorukov (yellow card) 40'; Kushev (yellow card) 79' | Report | Hong (yellow card) 22' (yellow-red card) 65'; Lengyel (yellow card) 28' | Stadium: Zvezda Stadium; Attendance: 12,800; Referee: Sergei Karasev |

| 22 March 2009 2 | Rostov | 1 – 1 | Lokomotiv Moscow | Rostov-on-Don |
| 19:00 MSK (UTC+4) | Lebedenko (yellow card) 35'; Petrović 39' | Report | Glushakov (yellow card) 58' (goal) 90+'; Dujmović (yellow card) 60'; Torbinski (yellow card) 64'; Kuzmin (yellow card) 72'; Mujiri (yellow card) 90+' | Stadium: Olimp-2; Attendance: 12,500; Referee: Stanislav Sukhina |

| 3 April 2009 3 | Khimki | 0 – 1 | Rostov | Khimki |
| 19:00 MSK (UTC+4) | Budyanskiy (yellow card) 39' | Report | Cherkes (yellow card) 52'; Lebedenko 75' | Stadium: Arena Khimki; Attendance: 4,000; Referee: Yuri Baskakov |

| 11 April 2009 4 | Dynamo Moscow | 1 – 0 | Rostov | Khimki |
| 17:00 MSK (UTC+4) | Dimidko (yellow card) 17'; K.Kombarov (yellow card) 24'; Fernández (red card) 37'; Kolodin (yellow card) 57'; Kerzhakov 77' (pen.) | Report | Osinov (yellow card) 23'; Ponomaryov (yellow card) 75' | Stadium: Arena Khimki; Attendance: 8,054; Referee: Igor Egorov |

| 18 April 2009 5 | Rostov | 0 – 0 | Krylia Sovetov | Rostov-on-Don |
| 20:00 MSK (UTC+4) | Kulchy (yellow card) 12'; Astafyev (yellow card) 32'; Cherkes (yellow card) 45'; Lengyel (yellow card) 77' | Report | Kalachev (yellow card) 8'; Ajinjal (yellow card) 40'; Jarošík (yellow card) 57' | Stadium: Olimp-2; Attendance: 11,500; Referee: Alexei Kovalev |

| 26 April 2009 6 | CSKA Moscow | 1 – 2 | Rostov | Moscow |
| 16:30 MSK (UTC+4) | Rozhkov 18' (o.g.); Zhirkov (yellow card) 56' | Report | Shchennikov 42' (o.g.); Hong 49'; Osinov (penalty missed) 73'; Mandrykin (yellow card) 76'; Ahmetović (yellow card) 78'; Cherkes (yellow card) 90' | Stadium: Luzhniki Stadium; Attendance: 11,000; Referee: Stanislav Sukhina |

| 3 May 2009 7 | Rostov | 2 – 1 | Zenit St.Petersburg | Rostov-on-Don |
| 15:15 MSK (UTC+4) | Akimov 53'; Rozhkov (yellow card) 60'; Astafyev (yellow card) 69'; Gațcan 85' | Report | Meira (yellow card) 75'; Pogrebnyak 83' (pen.); Tekke (yellow card) 88' (yellow-red card) 90+'; Križanac (yellow card) 90+' | Stadium: Olimp-2; Attendance: 16,500; Referee: Ildus Biglov |

| 11 May 2009 8 | Kuban Krasnodar | 0 – 0 | Rostov | Krasnodar |
| 19:00 MSK (UTC+4) | Dzhioyev (yellow card) 42'; Traoré (yellow card) 54'; Kasaev (yellow card) 73' | Report | Lengyel (yellow card) 44'; Lebedenko (yellow card) 60' | Stadium: Kuban Stadium; Attendance: 22,000; Referee: Sergei Karasev |

| 16 May 2009 9 | Rostov | 1 – 1 | Spartak Nalchik | Rostov-on-Don |
| 16:30 MSK (UTC+4) | Kulchy (yellow card) 12'; Lebedenko (yellow card) 28'; Lengyel (yellow card) 76'; Hong (yellow card) 90'; Petrović 90+' | Report | Leandro 24'; Mashukov (yellow card) 33'; Yatchenko (yellow card) 42'; Geteriev (yellow card) 82'; Amisulashvili (yellow card) 86' | Stadium: Olimp-2; Attendance: 13,000; Referee: Eduard Malyi |

| 24 May 2009 10 | Moscow | 2 – 0 | Rostov | Moscow |
| 14:00 MSK (UTC+4) | Samedov 33'; Česnauskis (yellow card) 48'; Jakubko 82' | Report | Rozhkov (yellow card) 50' (yellow-red card) 85' | Stadium: Eduard Streltsov Stadium; Attendance: 2,500; Referee: Vladislav Bezborodov |

| 30 May 2009 11 | Rostov | 1 – 1 | Terek Grozny | Rostov-on-Don |
| 14:00 MSK (UTC+4) | Gațcan (yellow card) 47'; Astafyev 53'; Anđelković (yellow card) 56'; Lengyel (yellow card) 62' | Report | Lakhiyalov 26'; Mishchenko (yellow card) 35'; Georgiev (yellow card) 60' | Stadium: Olimp-2; Attendance: 9,000; Referee: Almir Kayumov |

| 13 June 2009 12 | Rubin Kazan | 0 – 2 | Rostov | Kazan |
| 15:00 MSK (UTC+4) | Balyaikin (yellow card) 42' (red card) 44' | Report | Akimov 32', 55' (penalty missed) 44'; Cherkes (yellow card) 63'; Gațcan (yellow card) 69'; Anđelković (yellow card) 73'; Hong (yellow card) 79' | Stadium: Central Stadium; Attendance: 10,000; Referee: Vladimir Pettay |

| 11 July 2009 13 | Rostov | 0 – 1 | Spartak Moscow | Rostov-on-Don |
| 21:00 MSK (UTC+4) | Gațcan (yellow card) 22'; Lebedenko (yellow card) 67'; Petrović (yellow card) 76' | Report | Sabitov (yellow card) 45+'; Welliton 71' | Stadium: Olimp-2; Attendance: 15,800; Referee: Alexei Kovalev |

| 18 July 2009 14 | Saturn | 4 – 0 | Rostov | Ramenskoye |
| 20:30 MSK (UTC+4) | Loskov 16'; Nemov 43'; Kirichenko 65', 72'; Nakhushev (yellow card) 79'; Angbwa (yellow card) 90+' | Report | Osinov (penalty scored) 62'; Anđelković (yellow card) 85' | Stadium: Saturn Stadium; Attendance: 7,000; Referee: Vyacheslav Kharlamov |

| 25 July 2009 15 | Rostov | 0 – 0 | Tom Tomsk | Rostov-on-Don |
| 21:00 MSK (UTC+4) | Šljivić (yellow card) 85' | Report | | Stadium: Olimp-2; Attendance: 9,000; Referee: Almir Kayumov |

| 2 August 2009 16 | Lokomotiv Moscow | 2 – 0 | Rostov | Moscow |
| 19:30 MSK (UTC+4) | Dujmović (yellow card) 8'; Bilyaletdinov 42'; Pavlov (yellow card) 64'; Astafyev 86' (o.g.) | Report | Gațcan (yellow card) 23'; Šljivić (yellow card) 39'; Osinov (yellow card) 86' | Stadium: RZD Arena; Attendance: 20,250; Referee: Nikolai Ivanov |

| 9 August 2009 17 | Rostov | 2 – 0 | Khimki | Rostov-on-Don |
| 20:45 MSK (UTC+4) | Živanović (yellow card) 2'; Akimov 52'; Gitselov (yellow card) 68'; Gerus (yellow card) 90+'; Ahmetović 90+' (yellow card) 90+' | Report | Romaschenko (yellow card) 33'; Cvetković (yellow card) 55'; Starkov (yellow card) 72' | Stadium: Olimp-2; Attendance: 7,303; Referee: Maksim Layushkin |

| 15 August 2009 18 | Rostov | 0 – 1 | Dynamo Moscow | Rostov-on-Don |
| MSK (UTC+4) | Anđelković (yellow card) 38'; Astafyev (yellow card) 47'; Gațcan (yellow card) 87' | Report | Kowalczyk (yellow card) 16'; Kerzhakov 27'; Kombarov (yellow card) 56'; Kokorin (yellow card) 58'; D.Kombarov (yellow card) 64'; Gabulov (yellow card) 87'; Khokhlov (yellow card) 90+' | Stadium: Olimp-2; Attendance: 11,917; Referee: Stanislav Sukhina |

| 22 August 2009 19 | Krylia Sovetov | 2 – 2 | Rostov | Samara |
| 13:45 MSK (UTC+4) | Kalachev (yellow card) 41'; Koller 48'; Ivanov (yellow card) 50' (goal) 56'; Ajinjal (yellow card) 73' | Report | Akimov 52'; Ahmetović 81'; Gerus (yellow card) 90+' | Stadium: Metallurg Stadium; Attendance: 13,200; Referee: Vyacheslav Popov |

| 30 August 2009 20 | Rostov | 1 – 0 | CSKA Moscow | Rostov-on-Don |
| 20:30 MSK (UTC+4) | Gațcan (yellow card) 10'; Akimov (yellow card) 72'; Osinov 83'; Gerus (yellow card) 87' | Report | Ignashevich (yellow card) 76'; Krasić (yellow card) 78' | Stadium: Olimp-2; Attendance: 15,800; Referee: Vladimir Pettay |

| 13 September 2009 21 | Zenit St.Petersburg | 2 – 0 | Rostov | Saint Petersburg |
| 18:30 MSK (UTC+4) | Meira (yellow card) 40'; Zyryanov 45'; Anyukov (yellow card) 68'; Bystrov 78' (yellow card) 88'; Semshov (yellow card) 89' | Report | Anđelković (yellow card) 10'; Lebedenko (yellow card) 45+' | Stadium: Petrovsky Stadium; Attendance: 20,000; Referee: Sergei Karasev |

| 19 September 2009 22 | Rostov | 3 – 3 | Kuban Krasnodar | Rostov-on-Don |
| 16:15 MSK (UTC+4) | Pavlenko 15' (yellow card) 90+'; Gațcan 44' (yellow card) 89'; Lengyel (yellow card) 56' (yellow-red card) 68'; Ahmetović 73'; Petrović (yellow card) 90+' | Report | Tlisov 10', 31'; Babangida 57' (pen.) (yellow card) 83'; Dzhioyev (yellow card) 73'; Topchu (yellow card) 79'; Bairyyev (yellow card) 90+' | Stadium: Olimp-2; Attendance: 8,243; Referee: Yuri Baskakov |

| 27 September 2009 23 | Spartak Nalchik | 1 – 0 | Rostov | Nalchik |
| 14:00 MSK (UTC+4) | Samsonov (yellow card) 31'; Asildarov 52'; Leandro (yellow card) 59' | Report | Valikayev (yellow card) 22' (yellow-red card) 57'; Petrović (yellow card) 72'; Anđelković (yellow card) 85' | Stadium: Spartak Stadium; Attendance: 7,000; Referee: Igor Egorov |

| 3 October 2009 24 | Rostov | 2 – 2 | Moscow | Rostov-on-Don |
| 18:30 MSK (UTC+4) | Anđelković (yellow card) 31'; Akimov 41'; Petrović (yellow card) 45'; Sheriyev (yellow card) 55'; Lebedenko 58'; Mandrykin (yellow card) 64' | Report | Jakubko (yellow card) 26' (goal) 89'; Česnauskis (yellow card) 64'; Rebko 71' | Stadium: Olimp-2; Attendance: 7,125; Referee: Alexei Kovalev |

| 18 October 2009 25 | Terek Grozny | 1 – 3 | Rostov | Grozny |
| 14:00 MSK (UTC+4) | Katsayev (yellow card) 2'; Cléber (yellow card) 39'; Pancu (yellow card) 45+'; Sadayev 52'; Utsiyev (yellow card) 75' | Report | Valikayev (yellow card) 3'; Gațcan 12'; Pavlenko 18'; Ahmetović 44'; Astafyev (yellow card) 51' (yellow-red card) 90'; Anđelković (yellow card) 65' | Stadium: Sultan Bilimkhanov Stadium; Attendance: 6,100; Referee: Maksim Layushkin |

| 25 October 2009 26 | Rostov | 1 – 2 | Rubin Kazan | Rostov-on-Don |
| 19:00 MSK (UTC+4) | Šljivić (yellow card) 23'; Gațcan (yellow card) 35'; Petrović (yellow card) 41'; Sheriyev (yellow card) 44'; Ahmetović 47'; Kulchy (yellow card) 55' | Report | Kaleshin (yellow card) 7'; Domínguez 16'; Sharonov (yellow card) 26'; Kasaev (yellow card) 29'; Ansaldi 45' | Stadium: Olimp-2; Attendance: 15,145; Referee: Sergei Karasev |

| 1 November 2009 27 | Spartak Moscow | 5 – 1 | Rostov | Moscow |
| 14:00 MSK (UTC+4) | Alex 19', 59'; Carioca (yellow card) 28'; Yakovlev 39'; Ananidze 76'; Welliton 82' | Report | Lengyel (yellow card) 19'; Sheriyev (yellow card) 36'; Gațcan 51' (yellow card) 83' | Stadium: Luzhniki Stadium; Attendance: 15,000; Referee: Eduard Malyi |

| 7 November 2009 28 | Rostov | 1 – 2 | Saturn | Rostov-on-Don |
| 16:15 MSK (UTC+4) | Lebedenko 20'; Petrović (yellow card) 84'; Ahmetović (yellow card) 88' | Report | Topić 38' (yellow card) 39'; Karyaka 53' | Stadium: Olimp-2; Referee: Vladislav Bezborodov |

| 21 November 2009 29 | Tom Tomsk | 2 – 1 | Rostov | Tomsk |
| 14:00 MSK (UTC+4) | Klimov 3'; Maznov 49'; Michkov (yellow card) 75' | Report | Ahmetović 31'; Gațcan (yellow card) 70' | Stadium: Trud Stadium; Attendance: 10,000; Referee: Vladimir Pettay |

| 29 November 2009 30 | Rostov | 1 – 1 | Amkar Perm | Rostov-on-Don |
| 14:00 MSK (UTC+4) | Pavlenko 17' | Report | Volkov 9' (yellow card) 71'; Cherenchikov (yellow card) 48'; Novaković (yellow card) 60' | Stadium: Olimp-2; Attendance: 15,000; Referee: Evgeny Turbin |

==== League table ====
| Pos | Team | Pld | W | D | L | GF | GA | GD | Pts | Qualification or relegation |
|---|---|---|---|---|---|---|---|---|---|---|
| 12 | Terek Grozny | 30 | 9 | 6 | 15 | 33 | 48 | −15 | 33 | |
| 13 | Amkar Perm | 30 | 8 | 9 | 13 | 27 | 37 | −10 | 33 | |
| 14 | Rostov | 30 | 7 | 11 | 12 | 28 | 39 | −11 | 32 | |
| 15 | Kuban Krasnodar (R) | 30 | 6 | 10 | 14 | 23 | 51 | −28 | 28 | Relegation to First Division |
| 16 | Khimki (R) | 30 | 2 | 4 | 24 | 20 | 64 | −44 | 10 | Relegation to First Division |

Source: RFPL (in Russian)
Rules for classification: 1st points; 2nd matches won; 3rd head-to-head (points, matches won, goal difference, goals scored, away goals scored); 4th goal difference; 5th goals scored; 6th away goals scored; 7th position in previous season or decision game
(R) Relegated

=== Russian Cup ===
==== 2009-10 ====
| 15 July 2009 Last 32 | Avangard Podolsk | 4 – 2 | Rostov | Podolsk |
| 18:30 MSK (UTC+3) | Merkulov 11'; Artyom Kuzmichyov 16'; Akimenko (yellow card) 53'; Khrapov 61'; Chesnokov 87' | Report | Kuznetsov 5'; Akimov (yellow card) 34'; Astafyev 39'; Kulchy (yellow card) 44'; Hong (yellow card) 77' | Stadium: Trud Stadium; Attendance: 5,000; Referee: Aleksei Yeskov |

== Squad statistics ==
As of match played 29 November 2009

=== Appearances and goals ===
| No. | Pos | Nat | Player | Total | | Premier League | | Russian Cup | |
| No. | Pos | Nat | Player | Apps | Goals | Apps | Goals | Apps | Goals |
|---|---|---|---|---|---|---|---|---|---|
| 1 | GK | (Russia) RUS | Roman Gerus | 15 | 0 | 15 | 0 | 0 | 0 |
| 3 | DF | (Serbia) SRB | Dušan Anđelković | 26 | 0 | 25 | 0 | 1 | 0 |
| 4 | FW | (Russia) RUS | Igor Lebedenko | 30 | 4 | 25+4 | 4 | 0+1 | 0 |
| 5 | DF | (Russia) RUS | Aleksandr Cherkes | 22 | 0 | 20+1 | 0 | 1 | 0 |
| 6 | DF | (Czech Republic) CZE | Roman Lengyel | 28 | 0 | 27 | 0 | 1 | 0 |
| 7 | MF | (Belarus) BLR | Alyaksandr Kulchy | 29 | 0 | 27+1 | 0 | 1 | 0 |
| 8 | MF | (Russia) RUS | Maksim Astafyev | 24 | 2 | 21+2 | 1 | 1 | 1 |
| 9 | FW | (Russia) RUS | Dmitri Akimov | 24 | 6 | 19+4 | 6 | 1 | 0 |
| 10 | MF | (Russia) RUS | Mikhail Osinov | 19 | 1 | 16+2 | 1 | 1 | 0 |
| 12 | MF | (Russia) RUS | Pyotr Gitselov | 7 | 0 | 2+5 | 0 | 0 | 0 |
| 15 | MF | (Russia) RUS | Aleksandr Pavlenko | 9 | 3 | 9 | 3 | 0 | 0 |
| 16 | GK | (Russia) RUS | Veniamin Mandrykin | 10 | 0 | 10 | 0 | 0 | 0 |
| 18 | MF | (Serbia) SRB | Branimir Petrović | 23 | 2 | 14+9 | 2 | 0 | 0 |
| 19 | FW | (Bosnia and Herzegovina) BIH | Mersudin Ahmetović | 30 | 6 | 14+15 | 6 | 1 | 0 |
| 20 | MF | (Russia) RUS | Artur Valikayev | 6 | 0 | 2+4 | 0 | 0 | 0 |
| 21 | FW | (North Korea) PRK | Hong Yong-jo | 15 | 1 | 10+4 | 1 | 0+1 | 0 |
| 24 | MF | (Russia) RUS | Sergey Kuznetsov | 7 | 1 | 1+5 | 0 | 1 | 1 |
| 26 | DF | (Serbia) SRB | Ivan Živanović | 9 | 0 | 7+1 | 0 | 1 | 0 |
| 27 | GK | (Russia) RUS | Stanislav Khoteyev | 7 | 0 | 5+1 | 0 | 1 | 0 |
| 54 | DF | (Russia) RUS | Ivan Lapin | 3 | 0 | 0+3 | 0 | 0 | 0 |
| 57 | DF | (Russia) RUS | Astemir Sheriyev | 9 | 0 | 8+1 | 0 | 0 | 0 |
| 83 | DF | (Russia) RUS | Mikhail Rozhkov | 19 | 0 | 17+2 | 0 | 0 | 0 |
| 84 | MF | (Moldova) MDA | Alexandru Gațcan | 26 | 4 | 23+3 | 4 | 0 | 0 |
| 85 | MF | (Serbia) SRB | Nenad Šljivić | 14 | 0 | 8+5 | 0 | 0+1 | 0 |
| 87 | FW | (Russia) RUS | Yevgeni Lutsenko | 6 | 0 | 3+3 | 0 | 0 | 0 |
| 88 | FW | (Russia) RUS | Aleksandr Salugin | 6 | 0 | 1+5 | 0 | 0 | 0 |
Players away from the club on loan:
Players who left Rostov during the season:
| 14 | DF | (Russia) RUS | Aleksandr Ponomaryov | 1 | 0 | 0+1 | 0 | 0 | 0 |
| 51 | DF | (Russia) RUS | Andrei Sklyarov | 1 | 0 | 0+1 | 0 | 0 | 0 |

=== Goal scorers ===
| Place | Position | Nation | Number | Name | Premier League | Russian Cup | Total |
|---|---|---|---|---|---|---|---|
| 1 | FW | (Russia) | 9 | Dmitri Akimov | 6 | 0 | 6 |
| 1 | FW | (Bosnia and Herzegovina) | 19 | Mersudin Ahmetović | 6 | 0 | 6 |
| 3 | FW | (Russia) | 4 | Igor Lebedenko | 4 | 0 | 4 |
| 3 | MF | (Moldova) | 84 | Alexandru Gațcan | 4 | 0 | 4 |
| 5 | MF | (Russia) | 15 | Aleksandr Pavlenko | 3 | 0 | 3 |
| 6 | MF | (Serbia) | 18 | Branimir Petrović | 2 | 0 | 2 |
| 6 | MF | (Russia) | 8 | Maksim Astafyev | 1 | 1 | 2 |
| 8 | MF | (Russia) | 10 | Mikhail Osinov | 1 | 0 | 1 |
| 8 | FW | (North Korea) | 21 | Hong Yong-jo | 1 | 0 | 1 |
| 8 | MF | (Russia) | 24 | Sergey Kuznetsov | 0 | 1 | 1 |
| | | | | TOTALS | 28 | 2 | 30 |

=== Clean sheets ===
| Place | Position | Nation | Number | Name | Premier League | Russian Cup | Total |
|---|---|---|---|---|---|---|---|
| 1 | GK | (Russia) | 1 | Roman Gerus | 4 | 0 | 4 |
| 2 | GK | (Russia) | 16 | Veniamin Mandrykin | 3 | 0 | 3 |
| 3 | GK | (Russia) | 27 | Stanislav Khoteyev | 1 | 0 | 1 |
| TOTALS | | | | | 8 | 0 | 8 |

=== Disciplinary record ===
| Number | Nation | Position | Name | Premier League | | Russian Cup | | Total | |
| Number | Nation | Position | Name | Booked | Sent off (straight red) | Booked | Sent off (straight red) | Booked | Sent off (straight red) |
| 1 | (Russia) | GK | Roman Gerus | 3 | 0 | 0 | 0 | 3 | 0 |
| 3 | (Serbia) | DF | Dušan Anđelković | 7 | 0 | 0 | 0 | 7 | 0 |
| 4 | (Russia) | FW | Igor Lebedenko | 5 | 0 | 0 | 0 | 5 | 0 |
| 5 | (Russia) | DF | Aleksandr Cherkes | 7 | 1 | 0 | 0 | 7 | 1 |
| 6 | (Czech Republic) | DF | Roman Lengyel | 4 | 0 | 0 | 0 | 4 | 0 |
| 7 | (Belarus) | MF | Alyaksandr Kulchy | 3 | 0 | 1 | 0 | 4 | 0 |
| 8 | (Russia) | MF | Maksim Astafyev | 5 | 1 | 0 | 0 | 5 | 1 |
| 9 | (Russia) | FW | Dmitri Akimov | 1 | 0 | 1 | 0 | 2 | 0 |
| 10 | (Russia) | MF | Mikhail Osinov | 2 | 0 | 0 | 0 | 2 | 0 |
| 12 | (Russia) | MF | Pyotr Gitselov | 1 | 0 | 0 | 0 | 1 | 0 |
| 15 | (Russia) | MF | Aleksandr Pavlenko | 1 | 0 | 0 | 0 | 1 | 0 |
| 16 | (Russia) | GK | Veniamin Mandrykin | 2 | 0 | 0 | 0 | 2 | 0 |
| 18 | (Serbia) | MF | Branimir Petrović | 6 | 0 | 0 | 0 | 6 | 0 |
| 19 | (Bosnia and Herzegovina) | FW | Mersudin Ahmetović | 4 | 1 | 0 | 0 | 4 | 1 |
| 20 | (Russia) | MF | Artur Valikayev | 3 | 1 | 0 | 0 | 3 | 1 |
| 21 | (North Korea) | FW | Hong Yong-jo | 4 | 1 | 1 | 0 | 5 | 1 |
| 26 | (Serbia) | DF | Ivan Živanović | 1 | 0 | 0 | 0 | 1 | 0 |
| 57 | (Russia) | DF | Astemir Sheriyev | 3 | 0 | 0 | 0 | 3 | 0 |
| 83 | (Russia) | DF | Mikhail Rozhkov | 3 | 1 | 0 | 0 | 3 | 1 |
| 84 | (Moldova) | MF | Alexandru Gațcan | 11 | 0 | 0 | 0 | 11 | 0 |
| 85 | (Serbia) | MF | Nenad Šljivić | 3 | 0 | 0 | 0 | 3 | 0 |
Players away on loan:
Players who left Rostov during the season:
| 14 | (Russia) | DF | Aleksandr Ponomaryov | 1 | 0 | 0 | 0 | 1 | 0 |
| | | | TOTALS | 80 | 6 | 3 | 0 | 83 | 6 |
