= List of Russian football transfers summer 2009 =

This is a list of Russian football transfers in the summer transfer window 2009 by club. Only transfers of the 2009 Russian Premier League are included.

== Russian Premier League 2009 ==
=== Amkar Perm ===
In: Note: Flags indicate national team as defined under FIFA eligibility rules; some limited exceptions apply. Players may hold more than one non-FIFA nationality.

No.	Pos.	Nation	Player
2	DF	RUS	Sergei Morozov (from Torpedo Moscow)
6	MF	BUL	Dimitar Telkiyski (from (Israel) Hapoel Tel Aviv)
20	FW	CRO	Edin Junuzović (from (Slovenia) Rudar Velenje)
24	MF	CRO	Stjepan Babić (from Baltika Kaliningrad)
25	DF	RUS	Aleksei Yepifanov (from (Russia) SKA-Energiya Khabarovsk)
35	MF	RUS	Vladislav Lokhonov (from (Russia) Krasnodar-2000)
36	DF	RUS	Dmitry Lokhonov (from (Russia) Krasnodar-2000)
44	GK	RUS	Sergei Sinelnikov
51	MF	RUS	Inal Pukhayev (from Alania Vladikavkaz youth)
77	MF	RUS	Dmitri Sokolov (from Torpedo Moscow)
80	DF	RUS	Alan Bagayev (from Spartak Vladikavkaz)
89	MF	RUS	Andrei Sekretov (end of loan at Gornyak Uchaly)
97	FW	RUS	Andrei Andriyevskiy (from Moscow)

Out: Note: Flags indicate national team as defined under FIFA eligibility rules; some limited exceptions apply. Players may hold more than one non-FIFA nationality.

No.	Pos.	Nation	Player
3	MF	RUS	Ivan Starkov (on loan to Khimki)
40	DF	RUS	Aleksei Savelyev (to Academia Dimitrovgrad)
45	DF	RUS	Yevgeni Syrkov (released)
47	MF	RUS	Denis Kravtsov (released)
55	FW	UKR	Dmytro Pylypchuk
90	DF	RUS	Viktor Lachugin

=== CSKA Moscow ===
In: Note: Flags indicate national team as defined under FIFA eligibility rules; some limited exceptions apply. Players may hold more than one non-FIFA nationality.

No.	Pos.	Nation	Player
13	MF	CHI	Mark González (from (Spain) Betis)
20	FW	BRA	Guilherme (on loan from (Ukraine) Dynamo Kyiv)
23	MF	RUS	Nika Piliyev (from Lokomotiv Moscow)
26	FW	NGR	Sekou Oliseh (from (Denmark) Midtjylland)
37	DF	RUS	Maksim Potapov (from Spartak Moscow)
43	MF	RUS	Yevgeni Kobzar
44	MF	LAT	Vitālijs Maksimenko (on loan from (Latvia) Daugava Rīga)
54	DF	SRB	Uroš Ćosić (from (Serbia) Red Star Belgrade)

Out: Note: Flags indicate national team as defined under FIFA eligibility rules; some limited exceptions apply. Players may hold more than one non-FIFA nationality.

No.	Pos.	Nation	Player
5	MF	BRA	Ramón (on loan to Krylia Sovetov Samara)
8	FW	RUS	Dmitri Ryzhov (on loan to Alania Vladikavkaz)
9	FW	BRA	Vágner Love (on loan to (Brazil) Palmeiras)
18	MF	RUS	Yuri Zhirkov (to (England) Chelsea)
21	MF	CZE	Luboš Kalouda (on loan to (Czech Republic) Sparta Prague)
36	DF	RUS	Anton Vlasov (on loan to Anzhi Makhachkala)
38	MF	RUS	Yuri Petrakov (to Moscow)
58	DF	RUS	Sergei Perunov (on loan to Gazovik Orenburg)
88	MF	TUR	Caner Erkin (on loan to (Turkey) Galatasaray)
90	DF	RUS	Viktor Klimeyev (to Krylia Sovetov Samara)

=== Dynamo Moscow ===
In: Note: Flags indicate national team as defined under FIFA eligibility rules; some limited exceptions apply. Players may hold more than one non-FIFA nationality.

No.	Pos.	Nation	Player
22	MF	URU	Luis Aguiar (from (Portugal) Braga)
90	MF	RUS	Dmitri Tikhonov
92	FW	RUS	Vadim Pronkin
97	MF	RUS	Vitali Komisov

Out: Note: Flags indicate national team as defined under FIFA eligibility rules; some limited exceptions apply. Players may hold more than one non-FIFA nationality.

No.	Pos.	Nation	Player
38	MF	RUS	Kirill Kurochkin (on loan to Metallurg Lipetsk)
40	MF	RUS	Oleg Inkin (released)
42	MF	RUS	Ruslan Makhmutov (to Togliatti)
47	DF	RUS	Aleksandr Kuzminykh (to Togliatti)
70	MF	RUS	Andrei Altunin (released)
89	MF	RUS	Aleksandr Bebikh (on loan to Istra)

=== Khimki ===
In: Note: Flags indicate national team as defined under FIFA eligibility rules; some limited exceptions apply. Players may hold more than one non-FIFA nationality.

No.	Pos.	Nation	Player
15	DF	UKR	Dmytro Semochko (from (Ukraine) Metalist Kharkiv)
22	MF	BLR	Maksim Romaschenko (free agent, previous team – (Turkey) Bursaspor)
24	MF	NGR	Richard Eromoigbe (recovered from injury)
30	GK	SRB	Bojan Mišić (from (Serbia) Kolubara)
33	MF	RUS	Ivan Starkov (on loan from Amkar Perm)
34	MF	RUS	Valeri Zimakov
38	DF	RUS	Kamalutdin Akhmedov (from Alania Vladikavkaz)
41	GK	RUS	Aleksandr Zvezintsev
57	MF	RUS	Kirill Kiselyov
70	FW	RUS	Artyom Butyvskiy (from Krylia Sovetov Samara)
71	MF	RUS	Gor Oganesyan
78	DF	FRA	Sébastien Sansoni (from (Netherlands) Vitesse Arnhem)
79	FW	RUS	Denis Popov (free agent, previous team – Torpedo Moscow)
90	MF	RUS	Dmitri Podrezov (from Krylia Sovetov Samara)
99	FW	JAM	Errol Stevens (from (Jamaica) Harbour View F.C.)

Out: Note: Flags indicate national team as defined under FIFA eligibility rules; some limited exceptions apply. Players may hold more than one non-FIFA nationality.

No.	Pos.	Nation	Player
2	DF	ARM	Barsegh Kirakosyan (on loan to Metallurg Krasnoyarsk)
8	MF	RUS	Oleg Samsonov (to Spartak Nalchik, end of loan from Zenit St. Petersburg)
9	FW	RUS	Vladislav Nikiforov (to SKA-Energiya)
11	MF	UKR	Serhiy Pylypchuk (on loan to Spartak Nalchik)
12	GK	RUS	Dmitri Borodin (end of loan from Zenit St. Petersburg)
24	MF	NGR	Richard Eromoigbe (released)
28	MF	FIN	Jani Virtanen (to (Finland) Turun Palloseura)
31	FW	RUS	Eldar Nizamutdinov (on loan to Spartak Moscow)
32	FW	CRO	Marko Šimić (to (Croatia) Lokomotiva)
37	FW	RUS	Aleksei Alekseyev (on loan to Smena-Zenit St. Petersburg)
81	DF	BRA	Danielson (to (Portugal) Paços de Ferreira, previously on loan)

=== Krylia Sovetov Samara ===
In: Note: Flags indicate national team as defined under FIFA eligibility rules; some limited exceptions apply. Players may hold more than one non-FIFA nationality.

No.	Pos.	Nation	Player
6	FW	BRA	Ramón (on loan from CSKA Moscow)
22	FW	RUS	Roman Adamov (on loan from Rubin Kazan)
24	GK	RUS	Sergei Voronin
33	MF	MDA	Stanislav Ivanov (on loan from Lokomotiv Moscow)
41	DF	RUS	Viktor Klimeyev (from CSKA Moscow)
51	DF	RUS	Roman Polovov (from Kuban Krasnodar)
70	MF	RUS	Denis Shcherbak (from (Switzerland) AC Bellinzona)
71	MF	RUS	Sergei Tkachyov

Out: Note: Flags indicate national team as defined under FIFA eligibility rules; some limited exceptions apply. Players may hold more than one non-FIFA nationality.

No.	Pos.	Nation	Player
9	MF	BLR	Denis Kovba (to (Czech Republic) Sparta Prague)
14	DF	KOR	Oh Beom-Seok (to (South Korea) Ulsan Hyundai)
15	FW	RUS	Aleksandr Salugin (on loan to Rostov)
19	DF	COL	Juan Carlos Escobar (on loan to (Colombia) Cúcuta Deportivo)
27	DF	BLR	Syarhey Palitsevich (on loan to (Belarus) Naftan Novopolotsk)
34	MF	RUS	Nikita Antonov
57	FW	RUS	Artyom Butyvskiy (to Khimki)
69	MF	RUS	Dmitri Podrezov (to Khimki)
90	FW	BLR	Vitali Rushnitsky (on loan to (Belarus) Belshina Bobruisk)

=== Kuban Krasnodar ===
In: Note: Flags indicate national team as defined under FIFA eligibility rules; some limited exceptions apply. Players may hold more than one non-FIFA nationality.

No.	Pos.	Nation	Player
2	DF	POR	Francisco Zuela (from (Greece) Skoda Xanthi)
5	MF	ROU	Andrei Mureşan (on loan from (Romania) Gloria Bistriţa)
27	DF	RUS	Elbrus Zuraev (recovered from injury)
28	FW	RUS	Igor Shevchenko (from Terek Grozny)
30	MF	NGR	Haruna Babangida (from (Cyprus) Apollon Limassol)
32	FW	NGR	Emmanuel Okoduwa (on loan from (Ukraine) Dynamo Kyiv)
50	MF	RUS	Bunyamudin Mustafayev
63	MF	RUS	Aleksandr Avanesyan
69	DF	RUS	Sergei Gorelov
75	MF	RUS	Dmitri Miroshnichenko
89	MF	RUS	Vladislav Dubrov

Out: Note: Flags indicate national team as defined under FIFA eligibility rules; some limited exceptions apply. Players may hold more than one non-FIFA nationality.

No.	Pos.	Nation	Player
11	MF	RUS	Alan Kasaev (to Rubin Kazan)
13	DF	SRB	Sreten Sretenović (on loan to (Poland) Zagłębie Lubin)
20	MF	UKR	Dmitri Gorbushin (on loan to Chernomorets Novorossiysk)
21	FW	RUS	Aleksandr Tikhonovetsky (to Luch-Energiya Vladivostok)
35	MF	RUS	Artush Galstyan (to Nika Moscow)
37	MF	RUS	Yevgeni Odintsov (to Taganrog)
43	DF	RUS	Roman Bugayev (on loan to Torpedo Armavir)
65	DF	RUS	Roman Polovov (to Krylia Sovetov Samara)
80	MF	NGR	Sani Kaita (to Lokomotiv Moscow)
99	FW	BLR	Aliaksei Kuchuk (on loan to (Moldova) Sheriff Tiraspol)

=== Lokomotiv Moscow ===
In: Note: Flags indicate national team as defined under FIFA eligibility rules; some limited exceptions apply. Players may hold more than one non-FIFA nationality.

No.	Pos.	Nation	Player
13	MF	BRA	Wágner (from (Brazil) Cruzeiro)
18	MF	NGR	Sani Kaita (from Kuban Krasnodar, on loan from (France) AS Monaco)
30	DF	GEO	Malkhaz Asatiani (end of loan at (Ukraine) Dynamo Kyiv)
34	GK	SUI	Eldin Jakupović (end of loan at (Switzerland) Grasshopper Zürich)
69	DF	RUS	Sergei Yefimov (recovered from injury)
99	DF	RUS	Taras Burlak (end of loan at Volga Nizhny Novgorod)

Out: Note: Flags indicate national team as defined under FIFA eligibility rules; some limited exceptions apply. Players may hold more than one non-FIFA nationality.

No.	Pos.	Nation	Player
15	MF	BRA	Fininho (to (Brazil) Sport Club do Recife after contract expired)
22	GK	ITA	Ivan Pelizzoli (on loan to (Italy) AlbinoLeffe until July 2010)
63	MF	RUS	Diniyar Bilyaletdinov (to (England) Everton)
77	MF	MDA	Stanislav Ivanov (on loan to Krylia Sovetov Samara)
97	MF	RUS	Nika Piliyev (to CSKA Moscow)

=== FC Moscow ===
In: Note: Flags indicate national team as defined under FIFA eligibility rules; some limited exceptions apply. Players may hold more than one non-FIFA nationality.

No.	Pos.	Nation	Player
4	DF	BRA	Jean (from (Brazil) Corinthians)
6	DF	SLO	Branko Ilič (on loan from (Spain) Betis)
47	MF	RUS	Konstantin Belov
66	MF	RUS	Aleksandr Kolomeytsev (from Sportakademklub)
77	MF	RUS	Yuri Petrakov (from CSKA Moscow)
93	FW	RUS	Aleksei Kukhtinov (from Dynamo Saint Petersburg)

Out: Note: Flags indicate national team as defined under FIFA eligibility rules; some limited exceptions apply. Players may hold more than one non-FIFA nationality.

No.	Pos.	Nation	Player
10	MF	ARG	Pablo Barrientos (to (Italy) Catania, previously on loan at (Argentina) San Lorenzo)
25	MF	POL	Mariusz Jop (to (Poland) Wisła Kraków)
36	MF	RUS	Sergei Shudrov (on loan to SKA-Energiya Khabarovsk)
37	FW	RUS	Igor Kuzmin
38	FW	RUS	Andrei Andriyevskiy (to Amkar Perm)
44	MF	RUS	Oleg Aleynik (on loan to Metallurg Lipetsk)
45	FW	RUS	Pavel Yesikov (on loan to Volgar-Gazprom-2 Astrakhan)
69	FW	ARG	Héctor Bracamonte (to Terek Grozny)

=== FC Rostov ===
In: Note: Flags indicate national team as defined under FIFA eligibility rules; some limited exceptions apply. Players may hold more than one non-FIFA nationality.

No.	Pos.	Nation	Player
12	MF	RUS	Peter Gitselov (from Rubin-2 Kazan, on loan from Rubin Kazan)
20	DF	RUS	Artur Valikayev (from Nizhny Novgorod)
25	MF	RUS	Aleksandr Pavlenko (on loan from Spartak Moscow)
56	GK	RUS	Vladimir Zabuga (from Abinsk)
57	DF	RUS	Astemir Sheriyev (from Spartak Nalchik)
58	DF	RUS	Aleksei Klubkov
59	DF	RUS	Taymuraz Kozayev
60	FW	RUS	Dmitri Kortava
62	DF	RUS	Kirill Chekmaryov
63	MF	RUS	Andrei Lyakh (from Khimik Dzerzhinsk)
87	FW	RUS	Yevgeni Lutsenko (from Stavropolye-2009)
88	FW	RUS	Aleksandr Salugin (on loan from Krylia Sovetov Samara)

Out: Note: Flags indicate national team as defined under FIFA eligibility rules; some limited exceptions apply. Players may hold more than one non-FIFA nationality.

No.	Pos.	Nation	Player
14	DF	RUS	Aleksandr Ponomaryov (to Vityaz Podolsk)
33	MF	RUS	Mikhail Saleyev
39	MF	RUS	Mirzaga Huseynpur
51	MF	RUS	Andrei Sklyarov
79	MF	CRO	Tomislav Živko (to (Latvia) FK Ventspils)

=== Rubin Kazan ===
In: Note: Flags indicate national team as defined under FIFA eligibility rules; some limited exceptions apply. Players may hold more than one non-FIFA nationality.

No.	Pos.	Nation	Player
12	MF	ITA	Valerio Brandi (free agent, previously in (Italy) Milan youth academy)
42	MF	POL	Rafał Murawski (from (Poland) Lech Poznań)
88	MF	RUS	Alan Kasaev (from Kuban)
90	MF	RUS	Artyom Kulesha (from Smena-Zenit)

Out: Note: Flags indicate national team as defined under FIFA eligibility rules; some limited exceptions apply. Players may hold more than one non-FIFA nationality.

No.	Pos.	Nation	Player
8	MF	RUS	Makhach Gadzhiyev (end of loan from Saturn)
14	MF	UKR	Serhii Rebrov (retired)
21	FW	RUS	Roman Adamov (on loan to Krylia Sovetov)
—	MF	RUS	Peter Gitselov (on loan to Rostov, previously on loan at Rubin-2 Kazan)
—	DF	RUS	Mikhail Mischenko (on loan to Alania Vladikavkaz, previously on loan at Terek Grozny)

=== Saturn Moscow Oblast ===
In: Note: Flags indicate national team as defined under FIFA eligibility rules; some limited exceptions apply. Players may hold more than one non-FIFA nationality.

No.	Pos.	Nation	Player
2	DF	UKR	Dmytro Parfenov (free agent, previous team – (Ukraine) Arsenal Kyiv)
6	DF	RUS	Dmitri Grachyov (from KamAZ Naberezhnye Chelny)
9	MF	RUS	Makhach Gadzhiyev (end of loan at Rubin)
30	GK	RUS	Aleksandr Makarov (free agent, was a player of Saturn Moscow Oblast last season)
31	MF	UKR	Yevhen Levchenko (from (Netherlands) Groningen)
55	DF	RUS	Mikhail Kuzyayev
58	FW	RUS	Kirill Kuleshov (from Chertanovo)
69	MF	RUS	Dmitri Zinovich (from Shinnik)
71	MF	RUS	Artyom Bragin (from Saturn-2)

Out: Note: Flags indicate national team as defined under FIFA eligibility rules; some limited exceptions apply. Players may hold more than one non-FIFA nationality.

No.	Pos.	Nation	Player
11	FW	FIN	Alexei Eremenko (to (Ukraine) Metalist Kharkiv)
47	MF	RUS	Sergei Belousov (on loan to Zhemchuzhina-Sochi)
51	MF	RUS	Mikhail Shevyakov (to Saturn-2)

=== Spartak Moscow ===
In: Note: Flags indicate national team as defined under FIFA eligibility rules; some limited exceptions apply. Players may hold more than one non-FIFA nationality.

No.	Pos.	Nation	Player
2	MF	ARG	Cristian Maidana (end of loan at (Spain) Recreativo)
18	MF	BRA	Ibson (from (Portugal) Porto, end of loan at (Brazil) Flamengo)
48	MF	CRO	Filip Ozobić (end of loan at (Croatia) Zadar)
55	MF	GHA	Quincy Owusu-Abeyie (end of loan at (Wales) Cardiff City)
56	DF	RUS	Marat Khiyasov
57	FW	RUS	Artyom Nozdrunov
58	DF	BLR	Egor Filipenko (end of loan at Tom Tomsk)
60	GK	RUS	Sergei Pesyakov (from Shinnik Yaroslavl)
81	FW	RUS	Eldar Nizamutdinov (on loan from Khimki)

Out: Note: Flags indicate national team as defined under FIFA eligibility rules; some limited exceptions apply. Players may hold more than one non-FIFA nationality.

No.	Pos.	Nation	Player
8	MF	RUS	Aleksandr Pavlenko (on loan to FC Rostov)
9	FW	RUS	Artyom Dzyuba (on loan to Tom Tomsk)
14	DF	ARG	Clemente Rodríguez (to (Argentina) Estudiantes)
19	MF	RUS	Artur Maloyan (on loan to Anzhi Makhachkala)
23	MF	RUS	Vladimir Bystrov (to Zenit St. Petersburg)
29	FW	RUS	Amir Bazhev (on loan to Salyut-Energiya)
31	MF	RUS	Konstantin Sovetkin (on loan to Anzhi Makhachkala)
33	DF	RUS	Ilya Gultyayev (to Tom Tomsk)
42	GK	RUS	Yevgeni Gubin
47	DF	RUS	Maksim Potapov (to CSKA Moscow)
—	MF	CZE	Radoslav Kováč (to (England) West Ham, previously on loan)
—	FW	RUS	Aleksandr Prudnikov (on loan to (Czech Republic) Sparta Prague, previously on loan at Terek Grozny)

=== Spartak Nalchik ===
In: Note: Flags indicate national team as defined under FIFA eligibility rules; some limited exceptions apply. Players may hold more than one non-FIFA nationality.

No.	Pos.	Nation	Player
8	FW	GEO	David Siradze (free agent, previous team – (Germany) Paderborn 07)
10	FW	RUS	Nazir Kazharov (end of loan at Anzhi Makhachkala)
24	MF	RUS	Albert Balov (from Spartak-2 Nalchik, amateur league)
26	FW	RUS	Sergei Ovchinnikov (from SKA-Energiya Khabarovsk)
27	GK	RUS	Boris Shogenov
28	MF	RUS	Oleg Samsonov (from Khimki, on loan from Zenit Saint Petersburg)
29	MF	UKR	Serhiy Pylypchuk (on loan from Khimki)
46	DF	RUS	Zalim Kishev
47	MF	RUS	Rustam Shortanov
49	DF	RUS	Kantemir Khagabanov
55	FW	RUS	Shamil Asildarov (free agent, previous team – Luch-Energiya Vladivostok)
90	MF	BIH	Ricardo Lago (on loan from Krasnodar)

Out: Note: Flags indicate national team as defined under FIFA eligibility rules; some limited exceptions apply. Players may hold more than one non-FIFA nationality.

No.	Pos.	Nation	Player
6	DF	UKR	Vitaliy Shumeyko (to (Kazakhstan) Atyrau)
7	MF	GEO	Gogita Gogua (on loan to Terek Grozny)
16	FW	ARG	Franco Martin Parodi (end of loan from (Argentina) Defensores de Belgrano)
19	MF	RUS	Marat Dzakhmishev (on loan to Chernomorets Novorossiysk)
21	GK	KAZ	David Loria (to (Kazakhstan) Lokomotiv Astana)
37	MF	RUS	Astemir Sheriyev (to Rostov)
99	FW	BRA	Felipe Almeida (to (Azerbaijan) Baku)

=== Terek Grozny ===
In: Note: Flags indicate national team as defined under FIFA eligibility rules; some limited exceptions apply. Players may hold more than one non-FIFA nationality.

No.	Pos.	Nation	Player
4	DF	ISR	Ze'ev Haimovich (from (Israel) Maccabi Netanya)
26	MF	GEO	Gogita Gogua (on loan from Spartak Nalchik)
57	MF	RUS	German Kutarba (free agent, previous team – SKA Rostov-on-Don)
58	MF	BRA	Fabrício (free agent, previous team – (Brazil) Mesquita)
59	MF	RUS	Artyom Voronkin (free agent, was a player of Terek Grozny last season)
69	FW	ARG	Héctor Bracamonte (from Moscow)

Out: Note: Flags indicate national team as defined under FIFA eligibility rules; some limited exceptions apply. Players may hold more than one non-FIFA nationality.

No.	Pos.	Nation	Player
3	DF	RUS	Mikhail Mischenko (to Alania Vladikavkaz, end of loan from Rubin Kazan)
15	MF	CMR	Jean Bouli (to Nizhny Novgorod)
16	FW	RUS	Igor Shevchenko (to Kuban Krasnodar)
24	MF	RUS	Dmitri A. Smirnov (on loan to Tom Tomsk)
25	MF	CMR	Guy Stephane Essame (to Nizhny Novgorod)
29	FW	RUS	Aleksandr Prudnikov (to (Czech Republic) Sparta Prague, end of loan from Spartak Moscow)

=== Tom Tomsk ===
In: Note: Flags indicate national team as defined under FIFA eligibility rules; some limited exceptions apply. Players may hold more than one non-FIFA nationality.

No.	Pos.	Nation	Player
13	DF	RUS	Ilya Gultyayev (from Spartak Moscow)
14	FW	RUS	Artyom Dzyuba (on loan from Spartak Moscow)
32	MF	RUS	Dmitri A. Smirnov (on loan from Terek Grozny)
93	MF	RUS	Mikhail Bashilov

Out: Note: Flags indicate national team as defined under FIFA eligibility rules; some limited exceptions apply. Players may hold more than one non-FIFA nationality.

No.	Pos.	Nation	Player
9	FW	BLR	Sergei Kornilenko (to Zenit St. Petersburg)
10	FW	RUS	Anton Arkhipov (on loan to Chernomorets Novorossiysk)
15	DF	RUS	Sergei Golyatkin (on loan to Chernomorets Novorossiysk)
19	DF	RUS	Denis Yevsikov (released)
20	DF	BLR	Egor Filipenko (end of loan from Spartak Moscow)
70	DF	RUS	Vladislav Tkachenko

=== Zenit Saint Petersburg ===
In: Note: Flags indicate national team as defined under FIFA eligibility rules; some limited exceptions apply. Players may hold more than one non-FIFA nationality.

No.	Pos.	Nation	Player
17	MF	ITA	Alessandro Rosina (from (Italy) Torino)
19	FW	BLR	Sergei Kornilenko (from Tom Tomsk)
22	GK	RUS	Dmitri Borodin (end of loan at Khimki)
34	MF	RUS	Vladimir Bystrov (from Spartak Moscow)
73	FW	RUS	Stanislav Murikhin
80	MF	RUS	Maksim Batov
88	FW	SRB	Mateja Kežman (on loan from (France) Paris Saint-Germain)
92	MF	RUS	Nikita Bocharov

Out: Note: Flags indicate national team as defined under FIFA eligibility rules; some limited exceptions apply. Players may hold more than one non-FIFA nationality.

No.	Pos.	Nation	Player
8	FW	RUS	Pavel Pogrebnyak (to (Germany) VfB Stuttgart)
25	MF	NED	Fernando Ricksen (released)
31	FW	RUS	Vitali Galysh (to Togliatti)
44	MF	UKR	Anatoliy Tymoschuk (to (Germany) Bayern Munich)
65	DF	RUS	Yuri Boyev
—	DF	FRA	Sébastien Puygrenier (on loan to (France) AS Monaco, previously on loan at (England) Bolton Wanderers)
—	MF	RUS	Oleg Samsonov (on loan to Spartak Nalchik, previously on loan at Khimki)
