= Dmitri Chesnokov =

Russian footballer (1973–2019)

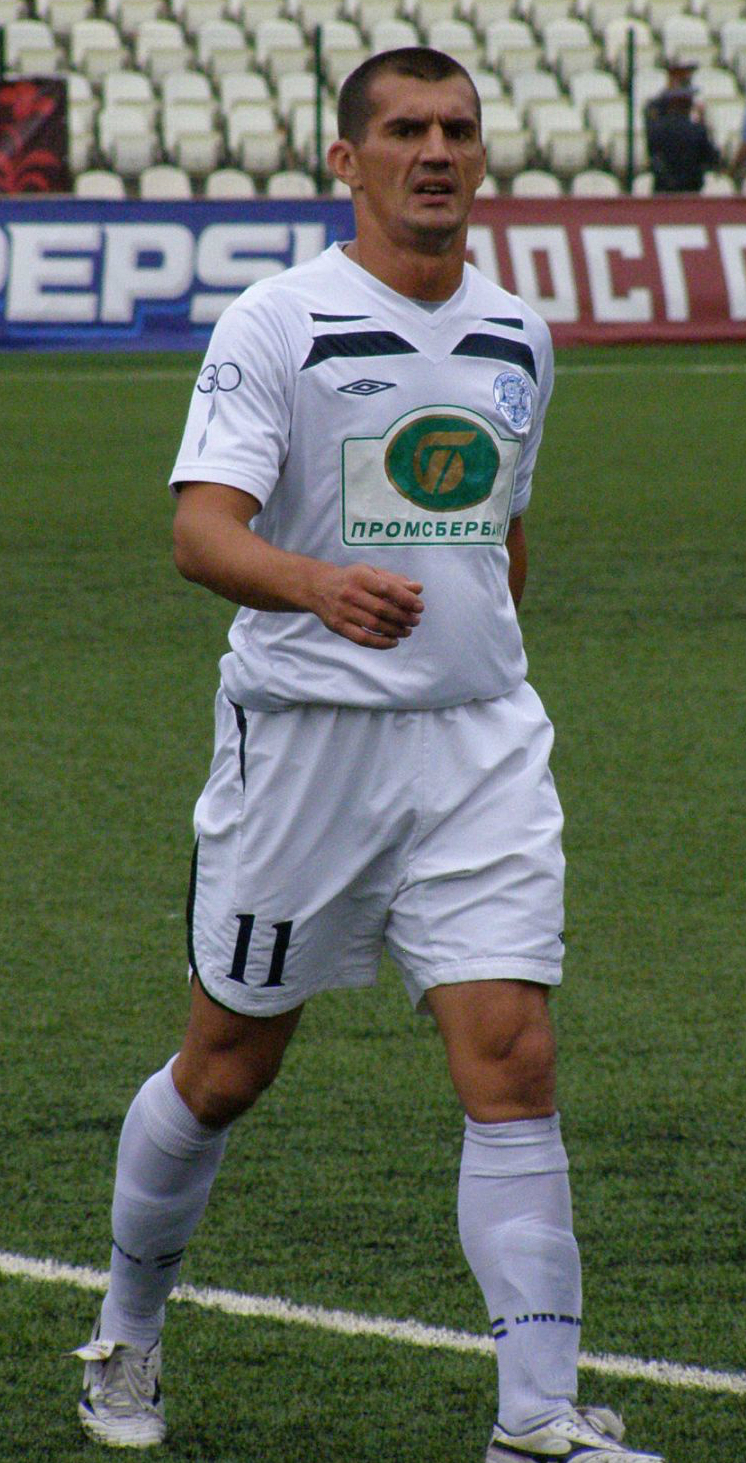
- Dmitri Chesnokov (2009)

Personal information
- Full name: Dmitri Yuryevich Chesnokov
- Date of birth: 26 April 1973
- Date of death: 14 December 2019 (aged 46)
- Height: 1.75 m (5 ft 9 in)
- Position: Forward

Senior career*
Years	Team	Apps	(Gls)
1994–1998	FC Titan Reutov	141	(53)
1999	FC Saturn Ramenskoye	14	(0)
2000–2005	FC Vityaz Podolsk	146	(101)
2006	FC Metallurg-Kuzbass Novokuznetsk	8	(1)
2007	FC Vityaz Podolsk	27	(10)
2008	FC Avangard Podolsk (D4)		
2009–2010	FC Avangard Podolsk	59	(12)
- * Club domestic league appearances and goals

Dmitri Yuryevich Chesnokov (Russian: Дмитрий Юрьевич Чесноков; 26 April 1973 – 14 December 2019) was a Russian professional footballer.

== Club career ==
He made his debut in the Russian Premier League in 1999 for FC Saturn Ramenskoye. His former club, FC Vityaz Podolsk, announced his death on 16 December 2019, at the age of 46. The club credited him as being their top goalscorer, with 119 goals over all tournaments.

== Personal life ==
Chersnokov's funeral was held on 17 December at the crematorium of the Nikolo-Arkhangelsk cemetery.

== Honours ==
- Russian Second Division Zone Center best player: 2005.
- Russian Second Division Zone Center top scorer: 2001 (27 goals), 2005 (30 goals).
