= Vityaz Podolsk =

Vityaz Podolsk may refer to:

- FC Vityaz Podolsk, a football (soccer) club based in Podolsk, Russia
- HC Vityaz Podolsk, an ice hockey team based in Podolsk, Russia
