= Akimenko =

Akimenko (Russian or Ukrainian: Акименко) is a gender-neutral Slavic surname that may refer to

- Andrei Akimenko (born 1979), Russian football player
- Mikhail Akimenko (born 1995), Russian high jumper
- Vladyslav Akimenko (born 1953), Soviet competition sailor
