= Denis Kirilenko =

Russian footballer

Personal information
- Full name: Denis Gennadievich Kirilenko
- Date of birth: 6 November 1984 (age 41)
- Place of birth: Chelbasskaya, Russian SFSR
- Height: 1.85 m (6 ft 1 in)
- Position: Midfielder

Senior career*
Years	Team	Apps	(Gls)
2003–2005	FC Krasnodar-2000	65	(3)
2006–2007	FC Kuban Krasnodar	27	(1)
2008–2009	FC Rostov	6	(0)
2008	→ FC Vityaz Podolsk (loan)	5	(1)
2009	→ FC Stavropolye-2009 (loan)	15	(8)
2009	→ FC Volga Tver (loan)	12	(0)
2010	FC Gubkin	27	(15)
2011–2013	FC Fakel Voronezh	38	(8)
2013–2015	FC Volgar Astrakhan	42	(5)
2015	FC Baikal Irkutsk	13	(0)
2016	FC Volga-Olimpiyets Nizhny Novgorod	4	(0)
- * Club domestic league appearances and goals

Denis Gennadievich Kirilenko (Russian: Денис Геннадьевич Кириленко; born 6 November 1984) is a former Russian professional football player.

== Playing career ==
He made his debut in the Russian Premier League in 2007 for FC Kuban Krasnodar.

He was banned for a year from playing football in 2011 for betting on games.
