= Aleksei Khrapov =

Russian footballer

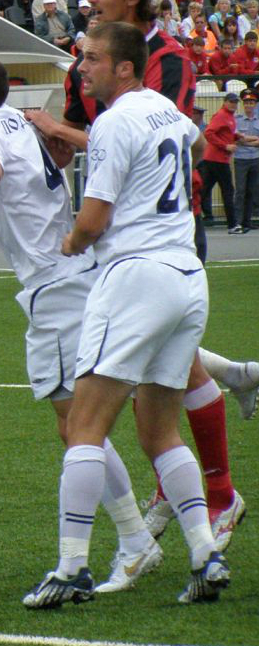

Personal information
- Full name: Aleksei Sergeyevich Khrapov
- Date of birth: 1 March 1979 (age 47)
- Place of birth: Moscow, Russian SFSR
- Height: 1.88 m (6 ft 2 in)
- Position: Defender

Youth career
- PFC CSKA Moscow

Senior career*
Years	Team	Apps	(Gls)
1997	PFC CSKA-d Moscow	11	(0)
1998	PFC CSKA-2 Moscow	38	(3)
1999	FC Saturn-2 Ramenskoye	23	(1)
2000	FC Vityaz Podolsk (amateur)		
2001–2008	FC Vityaz Podolsk	204	(26)
2008	FC Avangard Podolsk (amateur)		
2009–2010	FC Avangard Podolsk	58	(9)
2011–2012	FC Petrotrest St. Petersburg	42	(4)
2012–2013	FC Kaluga	33	(4)
2013–2016	FC Vityaz Podolsk	66	(6)
- * Club domestic league appearances and goals

Aleksei Sergeyevich Khrapov (Russian: Алексей Серге́евич Храпов; born 1 March 1979) is a former Russian professional football player.

== Club career ==
He played in the Russian Football National League for FC Vityaz Podolsk in 2008.

== Honours ==
- Russian Second Division Zone Center best defender: 2005.
