= Ildar Shabayev =

Russian footballer

Personal information
- Full name: Ildar Khaydarovich Shabayev
- Date of birth: 28 April 1985 (age 41)
- Place of birth: Kuybyshev, Russian SFSR
- Height: 1.80 m (5 ft 11 in)
- Position: Defender

Senior career*
Years	Team	Apps	(Gls)
2001–2003	FC Krylia Sovetov Samara	0	(0)
2003	FC Vityaz Podolsk	11	(1)
2004	FC Krasnodar-2000	15	(1)
2005	FC Zenit-2 St. Petersburg	25	(0)
2006–2007	FC Metallurg-Kuzbass Novokuznetsk	58	(1)
2008–2009	FC Rostov	16	(0)
2009	→ FC Vityaz Podolsk (loan)	35	(0)
2010	FC Mordovia Saransk	31	(0)
2011–2016	FC Yenisey Krasnoyarsk	155	(1)
2016–2017	FC Tyumen	22	(0)
2017–2018	FC Volga Ulyanovsk	18	(0)
2018–2020	FC TSK Simferopol		
- * Club domestic league appearances and goals

Ildar Khaydarovich Shabayev (Tatar: Илдар Хәйдәр улы Шабаев, Russian: Ильдар Хайдарович Шабаев; born 28 April 1985) is a Russian former professional football player.

== Club career ==
He played 10 seasons in the Russian Football National League for 6 different teams.

== Personal life ==
His brother Nail Shabayev is also a professional footballer.
