= Dmitri Borodin =

Russian footballer

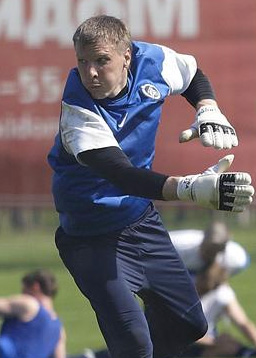
- Borodin in 2010

Personal information
- Full name: Dmitri Vladimirovich Borodin
- Date of birth: 8 October 1977 (age 49)
- Place of birth: Leningrad, Soviet Union
- Height: 1.91 m (6 ft 3 in)
- Position: Goalkeeper

Team information
- Current team: FC Dynamo Makhachkala (Goalkeeper coach)

Senior career*
Years	Team	Apps	(Gls)
1998–1999	Lokomotiv Saint Petersburg	28	(0)
2000–2001	Zenit Saint Petersburg	10	(0)
2002–2007	Torpedo Moscow	134	(0)
2008	FC Sibir Novosibirsk	17	(0)
2008	Anzhi Makhachkala	16	(0)
2009–2012	Zenit Saint Petersburg	2	(0)
2009	→ FC Khimki (loan)	2	(0)

Managerial career
- 2013–2014: Zenit Saint Petersburg (Goalkeeper coach)
- 2015–2018: Dynamo St. Petersburg (Goalkeeper coach)
- 2018–2025: PFC Sochi (Goalkeeper coach)
- 2026–: FC Dynamo Makhachkala (Goalkeeper coach)
- * Club domestic league appearances and goals

Dmitri Vladimirovich Borodin (Russian: Дмитрий Владимирович Бородин; born 8 October 1977) is a Russian former professional footballer who played as a goalkeeper. He works as the goalkeeper coach with FC Dynamo Makhachkala.

== Club career ==
Born in Leningrad (now Saint Petersburg), Soviet Union, Dimitri Borodin began playing in the junior squad for Lokomotiv Saint Petersburg in 1998. After establishing himself, he transferred to FC Zenit Saint Petersburg where he was a reserve goalkeeper behind Roman Berezovsky and Vyacheslav Malafeev.

In 2002, Borodin transferred to FC Torpedo Moscow and quickly established himself as the first choice goalkeeper (in 2003–04 UEFA Cup series against PFC CSKA Sofia, he saved three penalty shots in the deciding shootout, taking Torpedo to the second round). However, by 2007, Borodin became the third reserve goalkeeper behind Ilya Madilov and Maksim Kabanov.

After his career with Torpedo, Borodin had a brief stint with FC Sibir Novosibirsk during the spring of 2008 before transferring to FC Anzhi Makhachkala. On 25 February 2009, FC Zenit Saint Petersburg signed the goalkeeper, who already played for Zenit in 2001, to a four-year contract. In 2009, he was loaned out to FC Khimki and in August, he returned to Zenit.

== International career ==
Dmitri Borodin was called up to the Russia national team but did not make a debut.

== Career statistics ==
As of 7 September 2010

Appearances and goals by club, season and competition
Club	Div	Season	League		Cup		Europe		Total	
Club	Div	Season	Apps	Goals	Apps	Goals	Apps	Goals	Apps	Goals
Lokomotiv-d SPb	D4	1996	25	0	—		—		25	0
Lokomotiv-d SPb	D4	1997	18	0	—		—		18	0
Lokomotiv Saint Petersburg	D2	1997	—		1	0	—		1	0
Lokomotiv Saint Petersburg	D2	1998	6	0	2	0	—		8	0
Lokomotiv Saint Petersburg	D2	1999	22	0	2	0	—		24	0
Zenit Saint Petersburg	D1	2000	7	0	1	0	2	0	10	0
Zenit Saint Petersburg	D1	2001	3	0	—		—		3	0
Torpedo Moscow	D1	2002	2	0	—		—		2	0
Torpedo Moscow	D1	2003	20	0	5	0	4	0	29	0
Torpedo Moscow	D1	2004	30	0	2	0	—		32	0
Torpedo Moscow	D1	2005	28	0	4	0	—		32	0
Torpedo Moscow	D1	2006	20	0	5	0	—		25	0
Torpedo Moscow	D2	2007	34	0	4	0	—		38	0
Sibir	D2	2008	17	0	1	0	—		18	0
Anzhi Makhachkala	D2	2008	16	0	—		—		16	0
FC Khimki	D1	2009	2	0	—		—		2	0
Zenit Saint Petersburg	D1	2009	0	0	0	0	0	0	0	0
Zenit Saint Petersburg	D1	2010	1	0	0	0	0	0	0	0
Career total			245	0	27	0	6	0	277	0
