= Kalin Stepanyan =

Russian footballer and coach (1955–2024)

Personal information
- Full name: Kalin Yervandovich Stepanyan
- Date of birth: 15 May 1955
- Place of birth: Shamkor, Azerbaijan SSR, USSR
- Date of death: 3 August 2024 (aged 69)
- Height: 1.77 m (5 ft 10 in)
- Position: Defender

Senior career*
Years	Team	Apps	(Gls)
1981–1983	Spartak Oryol	96	(9)
1984–1987	Spartak Ordzhonikidze	145	(6)
1988–1990	Spartak Oryol	81	(4)
1990–1992	Avtodor Vladikavkaz	67	(5)
1997	Spartak Anapa	6	(0)

Managerial career
- 1992–1994: Avtodor Vladikavkaz (assistant)
- 1999–2000: Vityaz Krymsk
- 2001: Nemkom Krasnodar
- 2001–2002: Alania Vladikavkaz (reserves)
- 2003: Vityaz Krymsk
- 2004–2006: Volgar-Gazprom Astrakhan (assistant)
- 2007: Spartak-UGP Anapa (administrator)
- 2008–2009: FC Abinsk
- 2009: Mashuk-KMV Pyatigorsk
- 2012–2015: FC Astrakhan
- 2015: Druzhba Maykop
- * Club domestic league appearances and goals

Kalin Yervandovich Stepanyan (Russian: Калин Ервандович Степанян; 15 May 1955 – 3 August 2024) was a Russian professional football coach and a player of Armenian descent. He died on 3 August 2024, at the age of 69.
