= Vladislav Dubovoy =

Russian professional footballer

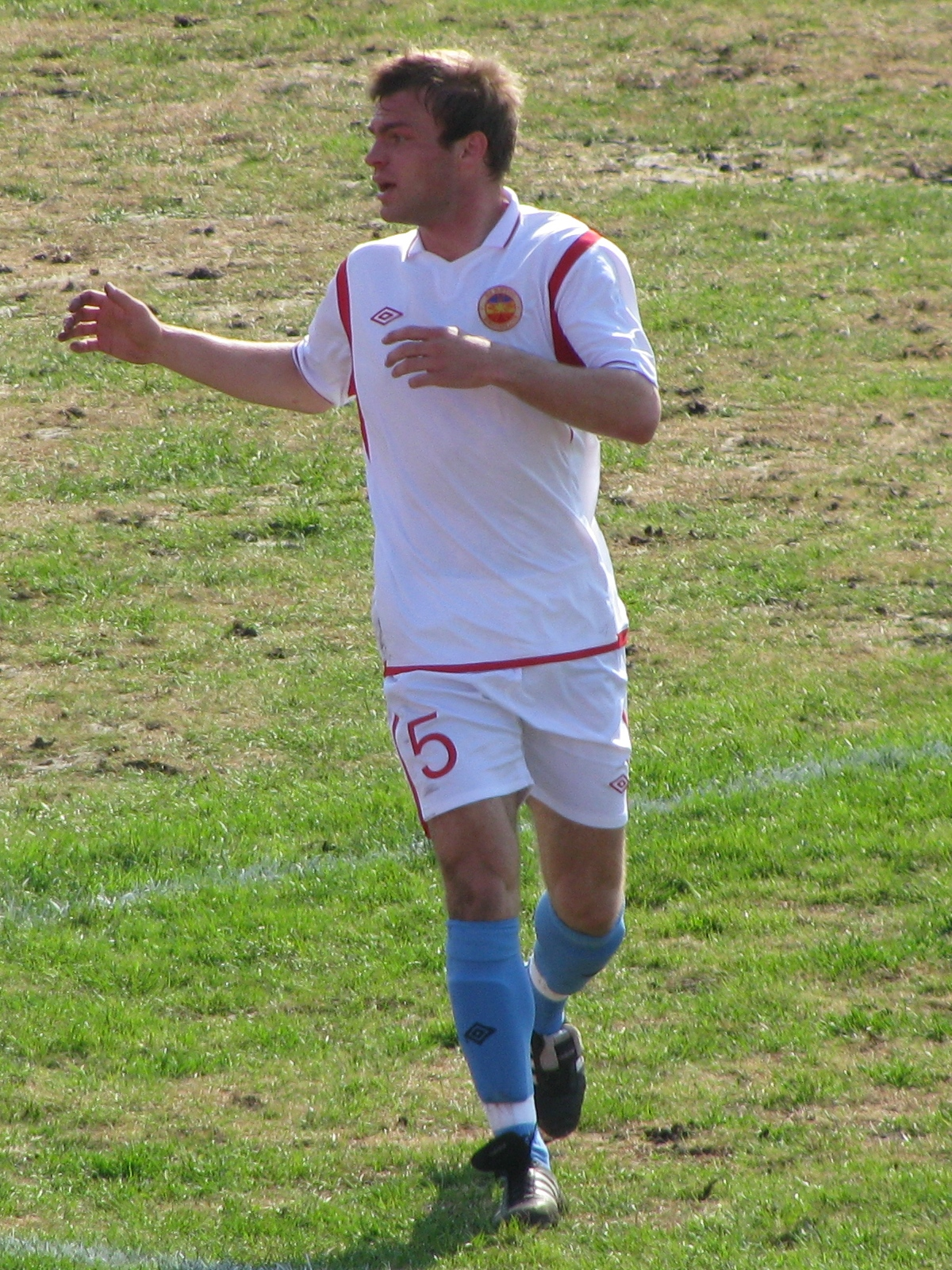

Personal information
- Full name: Vladislav Igorevich Dubovoy
- Date of birth: 5 January 1989 (age 37)
- Place of birth: Tsimlyansk, Russian SFSR
- Height: 1.76 m (5 ft 9 1/2 in)
- Position: Defender

Youth career
- 1999–2004: DYuSSh Tsimlyansk
- 2004: UOR Volgograd

Senior career*
Years	Team	Apps	(Gls)
2006–2007	FC Rostov	0	(0)
2008	FC Nika Krasny Sulin	28	(1)
2009	FC Rostov	0	(0)
2010–2014	FC MITOS Novocherkassk	115	(0)
2014–2015	FC Vityaz Krymsk	26	(0)
2015–2016	FC Chernomorets Novorossiysk	14	(0)
2016–2020	FC Chayka Peschanokopskoye	96	(11)
- * Club domestic league appearances and goals

Vladislav Igorevich Dubovoy (Russian: Владислав Игоревич Дубовой; born 5 January 1989) is a Russian former professional footballer.

== Club career ==
He made his professional debut in the Russian Second Division in 2008 for FC Nika Krasny Sulin.

He made his Russian Football National League debut for FC Chayka Peschanokopskoye on 7 July 2019 in a game against FC Chertanovo Moscow.
