= Yevgeni Lutsenko =

Russian footballer (born 1987)

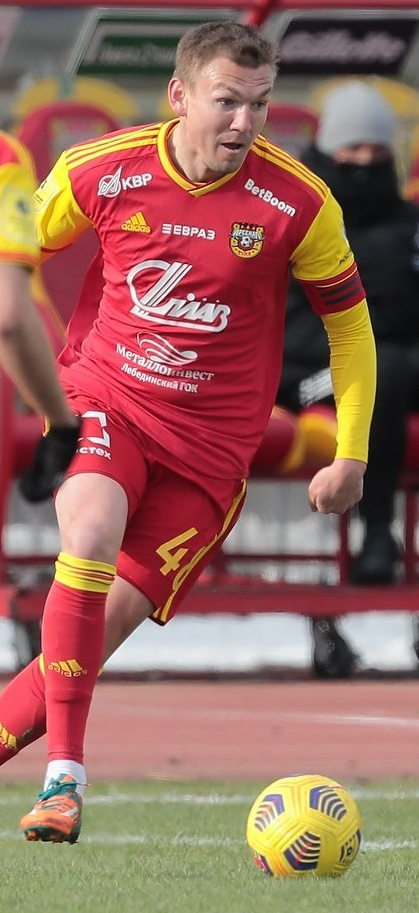
- Lutsenko with Arsenal Tula in 2021

Personal information
- Full name: Yevgeni Olegovich Lutsenko
- Date of birth: 25 February 1987 (age 39)
- Place of birth: Orenburg, Russian SFSR
- Height: 1.87 m (6 ft 2 in)
- Position: Forward

Youth career
- 1994–2001: Neftyanik Orenburg
- 2001–2004: Torpedo Moscow

Senior career*
Years	Team	Apps	(Gls)
2004–2008	FC Torpedo Moscow	101	(9)
2009	FC Stavropolye-2009	12	(0)
2009–2010	FC Rostov	11	(0)
2010	→ FC Salyut Belgorod (loan)	10	(1)
2011–2013	FC SKA-Energiya Khabarovsk	73	(21)
2013–2016	FC Mordovia Saransk	75	(16)
2016–2019	FC Dynamo Moscow	82	(14)
2019–2023	FC Arsenal Tula	98	(28)

International career
2007	Russia U21	4	(1)
- * Club domestic league appearances and goals

Yevgeni Olegovich Lutsenko (Russian: Евгений Олегович Луценко; born 25 February 1987) is a Russian former professional footballer who played as a striker.

== Club career ==
He made his debut in the Russian Premier League in 2004 for FC Torpedo Moscow.

On 14 June 2019, he left FC Dynamo Moscow upon the expiration of his contract.

On 16 June 2019, he signed a two-year contract with FC Arsenal Tula.

== International career ==
On 25 August 2020, he was called up for the Russia national football team for the first time for UEFA Nations League games against Serbia and Hungary in September 2020. Later on the same day, he was injured during Arsenal's league game and was not able to join the national team.

== Career statistics ==
As of match played on 21 May 2022

Club	Season	League			Cup		Continental		Other		Total	
Club	Season	Division	Apps	Goals	Apps	Goals	Apps	Goals	Apps	Goals	Apps	Goals
Torpedo Moscow	2004	RPL	1	0	0	0	–		–		1	0
Torpedo Moscow	2005	RPL	18	1	3	1	–		–		21	2
Torpedo Moscow	2006	RPL	23	3	5	0	–		–		28	3
Torpedo Moscow	2007	FNL	24	1	3	0	–		–		27	1
Torpedo Moscow	2008	FNL	35	4	1	0	–		–		36	4
Torpedo Moscow	Total		101	9	12	1	0	0	0	0	113	10
Stavropolye-2009	2009	PFL	12	0	0	0	–		–		12	0
Rostov	2009	RPL	6	0	–		–		–		6	0
Rostov	2010	RPL	5	0	0	0	–		–		5	0
Rostov	Total		11	0	0	0	0	0	0	0	11	0
Salyut Belgorod	2010	FNL	10	1	–		–		–		10	1
SKA-Energia Khabarovsk	2011–12	FNL	44	13	1	0	–		–		45	13
SKA-Energia Khabarovsk	2012–13	FNL	29	8	1	1	–		6 (Note: Two appearances in the promotion play-offs, four appearances, two goals in the FNL Cup)	2	36	11
SKA-Energia Khabarovsk	Total		73	21	2	1	0	0	6	2	81	24
Mordovia Saransk	2013–14	FNL	26	4	2	0	–		4 (Note: Appearances in the FNL Cup)	0	32	4
Mordovia Saransk	2014–15	RPL	22	2	2	1	–		–		24	3
Mordovia Saransk	2015–16	RPL	27	10	0	0	–		–		27	10
Mordovia Saransk	Total		75	16	4	1	0	0	4	0	83	17
Dynamo Moscow	2016–17	FNL	30	6	2	1	–		–		32	7
Dynamo Moscow	2017–18	RPL	22	4	1	0	–		–		23	4
Dynamo Moscow	2018–19	RPL	30	4	1	0	–		–		31	4
Dynamo Moscow	Total		82	14	4	1	0	0	0	0	86	15
Arsenal Tula	2019–20	RPL	28	15	1	0	2 (Note: Appearances in the UEFA Europa League)	0	–		31	15
Arsenal Tula	2020–21	RPL	19	2	2	1	–		–		21	3
Arsenal Tula	2021–22	RPL	21	3	1	0	–		–		22	3
Arsenal Tula	Total		68	20	4	1	2	0	0	0	74	21
Career total			432	81	26	5	2	0	10	2	470	88
