= Nenad Šljivić =

Serbian footballer (born 1985)

Personal information
- Date of birth: 8 June 1985 (age 41)
- Place of birth: Kruševac, SFR Yugoslavia
- Height: 1.80 m (5 ft 11 in)
- Position: Central midfielder

Youth career
- –2003: Napredak Kruševac

Senior career*
Years	Team	Apps	(Gls)
2003–2004	Trayal Kruševac		
2004–2008	Napredak Kruševac	94	(1)
2008–2009	Rostov	29	(0)
2009–2010	Jagodina	29	(0)
2011–2015	Tobol	122	(3)
2016	Spartak Subotica	14	(1)
2016–2018	Napredak Kruševac	64	(9)
2018–2020	Balzan	32	(0)
2020–2021	Radnički Niš	8	(0)
2021–2022	Budućnost Dobanovci	13	(0)
2022–2023	BASK		
Total		405	(14)
- * Club domestic league appearances and goals

Nenad Šljivić (Serbian Cyrillic: Ненад Шљивић; born 8 June 1985) is a Serbian retired footballer.

== Career ==
Previously he played with FK Napredak Kruševac and Russian FC Rostov.

In January 2011, Šljivić signed for Kazakhstan Premier League side FC Tobol. After 5 seasons in Kazakhstan with FC Tobol, Šljivić returned to Serbia at the start of 2016, signing for FK Spartak Subotica on 31 January 2016.

== Career statistics ==
As of match played 13 September 2015

Club	Season	League			National Cup		Continental		Other		Total	
Club	Season	Division	Apps	Goals	Apps	Goals	Apps	Goals	Apps	Goals	Apps	Goals
Rostov	2008	Russian First Division					-		-			
Rostov	2009	Russian Premier League	13	0			-		-		13	0
Rostov	Total		0	0	0	0	0	0	0	0	0	0
Tobol	2011	Kazakhstan Premier League	27	0	5	0	2	0	1	0	35	0
Tobol	2012	Kazakhstan Premier League	22	1	3	0	-		-		25	1
Tobol	2013	Kazakhstan Premier League	31	2	1	0	-		-		32	2
Tobol	2014	Kazakhstan Premier League	21	0	0	0	-		-		21	0
Tobol	2015	Kazakhstan Premier League	21	0	4	0	-		-		25	0
Tobol	Total		122	3	13	0	2	0	1	0	138	3
Career total			122	3	13	0	2	0	1	0	138	3
