= Andrei Akimenko =

Russian footballer

Personal information
- Full name: Andrei Alekseyevich Akimenko
- Date of birth: 18 February 1979 (age 47)
- Place of birth: Moscow, Russian SFSR
- Height: 1.77 m (5 ft 10 in)
- Positions: Defender; midfielder

Youth career
- PFC CSKA Moscow

Senior career*
| Years | Team | Apps | (Gls) |
| 1997 | PFC CSKA-d Moscow | 17 | (0) |
| 1998 | PFC CSKA-2 Moscow | 9 | (1) |
| 1998 | FC Krasnoznamensk-Selyatino Krasnoznamensk | 14 | (0) |
| 1999 | FC Saturn-2 Ramenskoye | 30 | (0) |
| 2000 | FC Vityaz Podolsk (amateur) | | |
| 2001 | FC Nika Moscow | 13 | (0) |
| 2001 | FC Istra (amateur) | | |
| 2002 | FC Fakel-Voronezh Voronezh | 25 | (0) |
| 2003–2004 | FC Zvezda Irkutsk | 42 | (3) |
| 2005 | FC Istra (amateur) | | |
| 2006 | FC Zvezda Irkutsk | 32 | (7) |
| 2007–2008 | FC Avangard Podolsk (amateur) | | |
| 2009–2010 | FC Avangard Podolsk | 55 | (6) |
| 2011–2012 | FC Oka Stupino (amateur) | | |
| 2012 | FC Saturn Ramenskoye (amateur) | | |
| 2013 | FC Prialit Reutov | | |
| 2013–2015 | FC Odintsovo | | |
- * Club domestic league appearances and goals

Andrei Alekseyevich Akimenko (Russian: Андрей Алексеевич Акименко; born 18 February 1979) is a former Russian professional football player.

== Club career ==
He played in the Russian Football National League for FC Fakel Voronezh in 2002.
