= Franco Parodi =

Argentine footballer

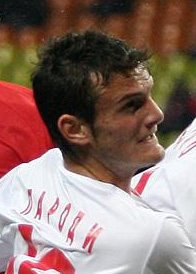

Personal information
- Full name: Franco Martín Parodi
- Date of birth: 29 November 1989 (age 36)
- Place of birth: Buenos Aires, Argentina
- Height: 1.86 m (6 ft 1 in)
- Position: Striker

Youth career
- Defensores de Belgrano

Senior career*
Years	Team	Apps	(Gls)
2007–2009	Defensores de Belgrano	3	(0)
2009	→ Spartak Nalchik (loan)	6	(0)
2009	Rio Ave	0	(0)
2009–2010	Defensores de Belgrano		
2011–2012	Milazzo		
2012	Darfo Boario		
2013–2014	Defensores Unidos		
2014–2015	J.J. de Urquiza		
2015	US Levico Terme	6	(1)
2016–2017	Cañuelas		
- * Club domestic league appearances and goals

Franco Martín Parodi (born 29 November 1989) is a former Argentine professional footballer who played as a striker.

== Club career ==
In August 2009, Parodi left for Russian side Spartak Nalchik for Portuguese first division side Rio Ave F.C. His time with Rio Ave was short-lived, as 16 days after signing he left the club.
