= Konstantin Sarsania =

Russian footballer (1968–2017)

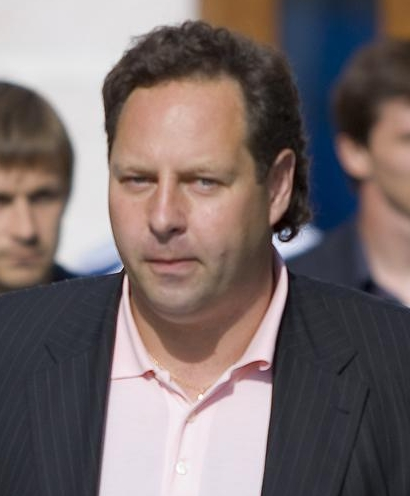

Personal information
- Full name: Konstantin Sergeyevich Sarsania
- Date of birth: 11 June 1968
- Place of birth: Moscow, Russian SFSR
- Date of death: 7 October 2017 (aged 49)
- Place of death: Moscow, Russia
- Height: 1.85 m (6 ft 1 in)
- Position: Defender

Youth career
- Dynamo Moscow

Senior career*
Years	Team	Apps	(Gls)
1985–1988	Dynamo Moscow	0	(0)
1988	Fakel Voronezh	3	(1)
1988	Dynamo-2 Moscow	18	(0)
1988	Spartak Moscow	0	(0)
1988–1989	Krasnaya Presnya Moscow	34	(3)
1989	Spartak Ordzhonikidze	9	(0)
1990	Asmaral Moscow	17	(3)
1991–1992	Dunkerque	6	(1)
1992–1993	US Armagnac		

Managerial career
- 2005: Sportakademklub Moscow (president)
- 2006–2008: Sportakademklub Moscow
- 2006–2007: Zenit St. Petersburg (sporting director)
- 2008: Zenit St. Petersburg (advisor)
- 2009: Khimki
- 2009–2010: Dynamo Moscow (sporting director)
- 2010–2012: Fakel Voronezh
- 2012: RFS (advisor)
- 2013–2017: Atlantas
- 2017: Zenit St. Petersburg (sporting director)
- * Club domestic league appearances and goals

Konstantin Sergeyevich Sarsania (Russian: Константи́н Серге́евич Сарса́ния; 11 June 1968 – 7 October 2017) was a Russian professional football coach, player, and agent. At the time of his death he worked as sporting director for Zenit St. Petersburg.

== Career ==
He made his debut as a player in the Soviet Second League in 1988 for Dynamo-2 Moscow. He was a licensed FIFA player agent since 1998 and represented, among others, Vyacheslav Malafeev, Aleksandr Pavlenko and Vitaliy Denisov.

In October 2009, he was appointed the new director of sports for Dynamo Moscow. His official contract started in 2010. In August 2010, he was appointed the head coach of Fakel Voronezh, and due to a technicality (the same person can't be registered for two professional teams at the same time), had to be un-registered from his Dynamo Moscow post, even though he continued to serve his duties of that position as well as coaching Fakel. He was dismissed from his position as director of sports with Dynamo Moscow on 6 December2010, officially to focus on his Fakel coaching position.
