= Roman Lengyel =

Czech footballer (born 1978)

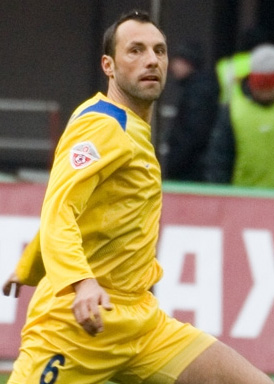

Personal information
- Date of birth: 3 November 1978 (age 48)
- Place of birth: České Budějovice, Czechoslovakia
- Height: 1.90 m (6 ft 3 in)
- Position: Defender

Youth career
- 1984–1987: Lokomotiva České Budějovice
- 1987–1996: Dynamo České Budějovice

Senior career*
Years	Team	Apps	(Gls)
1996–2000	Dynamo České Budějovice	81	(8)
2000–2001	Sparta Prague	18	(1)
2001–2004	Teplice	56	(1)
2004–2005	Saturn Ramenskoye	3	(0)
2005–2008	Kuban Krasnodar	146	(2)
2009–2010	FC Rostov	29	(0)
2010–2015	Dynamo České Budějovice	106	(5)
Total		439	(17)
- * Club domestic league appearances and goals

Roman Lengyel (born 3 November 1978 in České Budějovice) is a Czech former professional footballer who played as a defender.
