= Branimir Petrović =

Serbian footballer

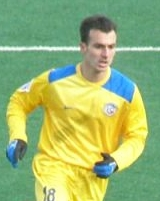
- Petrović with Rostov

Personal information
- Date of birth: 26 June 1982 (age 44)
- Place of birth: Titovo Užice, SFR Yugoslavia
- Height: 1.82 m (5 ft 11 1/2 in)
- Position: Attacking midfielder

Senior career*
Years	Team	Apps	(Gls)
1998–2001	Sloboda Užice	19	(2)
2001–2004	Zeta	86	(17)
2004–2006	Partizan	18	(1)
2005	→ Shandong Luneng (loan)	7	(0)
2006	→ Zeta (loan)	11	(4)
2006–2008	KAMAZ	71	(10)
2007	→ Rubin Kazan (loan)	6	(1)
2009	Rostov	23	(2)
2010	Krylia Sovetov	11	(0)
2011–2013	Ural	46	(8)
2013–2014	Kortrijk	3	(0)
2014–2016	Volgar Astrakhan	50	(2)
2016–2017	Napredak Kruševac	13	(1)

International career
2001–2004	Serbia and Montenegro U21	5	(1)
2004	Serbia and Montenegro U23	2	(0)

Managerial career
- 2021–2022: Alania Vladikavkaz (conditioning)
- 2022–2023: Khimki (assistant)
- 2023–2024: Khimki-M
- 2026: Serikspor
Medal record
Silver medal – second place	UEFA Under-21 Championship	2004
- * Club domestic league appearances and goals

Branimir Petrović (Serbian Cyrillic: Бранимир Петровић; born 26 June 1982) is a Serbian football coach and a former midfielder.

== Playing career ==
He was part of the Serbia and Montenegro team at the 2004 Summer Olympics, where they exited in the first round, finishing last in Group C behind gold-medal winners Argentina, Australia and Tunisia. He made two appearances.

== Coaching career ==
On 3 September 2022, Petrović was hired as an assistant manager by Russian Premier League club Khimki. He was assisting Spartak Gogniyev, who was previously his teammate as a player at KAMAZ and Ural.
