= Roman Polovov =

Russian footballer

Personal information
- Full name: Roman Aleksandrovich Polovov
- Date of birth: 9 February 1990 (age 36)
- Height: 1.83 m (6 ft 0 in)
- Position: Defender

Youth career
- FC Olimpia Volgograd

Senior career*
Years	Team	Apps	(Gls)
2007	FC Olimpia Volgograd	3	(0)
2008	FC Krylia Sovetov Samara	0	(0)
2009	FC Kuban Krasnodar	0	(0)
2009–2010	FC Krylia Sovetov Samara	1	(0)
2010	→ FC Energiya Volzhsky (loan)	10	(0)
2011	FC Energiya Volzhsky	9	(0)
2012	FC Olimpia Volgograd	5	(0)
2012	FC Urozhay Yelan		
2013	FC Gefest	7	(0)
2013	FC Khimik Novomoskovsk (amateur)		
2014–2015	FC Tsement Mikhaylovka (amateur)		
- * Club domestic league appearances and goals

Roman Aleksandrovich Polovov (Russian: Роман Александрович Половов; born 9 February 1990) is a former Russian professional footballer.

== Club career ==
He made his professional debut in the Russian Second Division in 2007 for FC Olimpia Volgograd.
