= 2009 Russian Premier League =

18th season of top-tier football league in Russia

Russian Premier League
- Season: 2009
- Champions: FC Rubin Kazan; 2nd title
- Relegated: FC Kuban Krasnodar; FC Khimki; FC Moscow
- Champions League: FC Rubin Kazan; FC Spartak Moscow; FC Zenit Saint Petersburg
- Europa League: FC Lokomotiv Moscow; PFC CSKA Moscow
- Matches: 240
- Goals: 600 (2.5 per match)
- Top goalscorer: Welliton (21)
- Biggest home win: Spartak Moscow 5–0 Tom
- Biggest away win: Saturn 0–5 Rubin
- Highest scoring: 10 matches with 6 goals in each

The 2009 Russian Premier League was the 18th season of the Russian football championship since the dissolution of the Soviet Union and 8th under the current Russian Premier League name. The season started on 14 March 2009 with a goalless draw between Amkar Perm and Rostov. The last matches were played on 29 November 2009. On 21 November 2009 Rubin Kazan successfully retained their champion's title.

== Teams ==
As in the previous season, 16 teams played in the 2009 season. After the 2008 season, Shinnik Yaroslavl and Luch-Energiya Vladivostok were relegated to the 2009 Russian First Division. They were replaced by Rostov and Kuban Krasnodar, the winners and runners up of the 2008 Russian First Division.

=== Venues ===
Dynamo Moscow played their home games during the 2009 season at the new Arena Khimki, due to their Dynamo Stadium undergoing renovation work.

Amkar	CSKA	Dynamo	Khimki
Zvezda Stadium	Luzhniki Stadium	Arena Khimki	Arena Khimki
Capacity: 17,000	Capacity: 81,000	Capacity: 18,840	Capacity: 18,840
Krylia	Locations of teams in 2009 Russian Premier League Locations of teams in 2009 Russian Premier League, Tomsk		Kuban
Metallurg Stadium	Locations of teams in 2009 Russian Premier League Locations of teams in 2009 Russian Premier League, Tomsk		Kuban Stadium
Capacity: 27,084	Locations of teams in 2009 Russian Premier League Locations of teams in 2009 Russian Premier League, Tomsk		Capacity: 28,800
Lokomotiv	Locations of teams in 2009 Russian Premier League Locations of teams in 2009 Russian Premier League, Tomsk		Moscow
RZD Arena	Locations of teams in 2009 Russian Premier League Locations of teams in 2009 Russian Premier League, Tomsk		Eduard Streltsov Stadium
Capacity: 33,001	Locations of teams in 2009 Russian Premier League Locations of teams in 2009 Russian Premier League, Tomsk		Capacity: 13,450
Rostov	Locations of teams in 2009 Russian Premier League Locations of teams in 2009 Russian Premier League, Tomsk		Rubin
Olimp-2	Locations of teams in 2009 Russian Premier League Locations of teams in 2009 Russian Premier League, Tomsk		Central Stadium
Capacity: 15,840	Locations of teams in 2009 Russian Premier League Locations of teams in 2009 Russian Premier League, Tomsk		Capacity: 22,500
Saturn	Locations of teams in 2009 Russian Premier League Locations of teams in 2009 Russian Premier League, Tomsk		Spartak Moscow
Saturn Stadium	Locations of teams in 2009 Russian Premier League Locations of teams in 2009 Russian Premier League, Tomsk		Luzhniki Stadium
Capacity: 14,685	Locations of teams in 2009 Russian Premier League Locations of teams in 2009 Russian Premier League, Tomsk		Capacity: 81,029
Spartak Nalchik	Terek	Tom	Zenit Saint Petersburg
Spartak Stadium	Sultan Bilimkhanov Stadium	Trud Stadium	Petrovsky Stadium
Capacity: 14,149	Capacity: 10,400	Capacity: 10,028	Capacity: 21,570

=== Personnel and kits ===
Team	Location	Head coach	Captain	Kit manufacturer	Shirt sponsor
Amkar Perm	Perm	(Tajikistan) Rashid Rakhimov	(Bulgaria) Martin Kushev	Nike	
CSKA	Moscow	(Russia) Leonid Slutsky	(Russia) Igor Akinfeev	Reebok	Aeroflot
Dynamo	Moscow	(Russia) Andrey Kobelev	(Russia) Dmitri Khokhlov	Umbro	VTB Bank
Khimki	Khimki	(Russia) Igor Chugainov (Caretaker)	(Bosnia and Herzegovina) Dragan Blatnjak	Nike	
Krylia	Samara	(Russia) Yuri Gazzaev	(Russia) Ruslan Ajinjal	Nike	
Kuban	Krasnodar	(Armenia) Poghos Galstyan (Caretaker)	(Russia) Andrei Topchu	Nike	
Lokomotiv	Moscow	(Russia) Yuri Semin	(Brazil) Rodolfo	Adidas	
Moscow	Moscow	(Montenegro) Miodrag Božović	(Belarus) Yuri Zhevnov	Umbro	
Rostov	Rostov-on-Don	(Russia) Oleg Dolmatov	(Russia) Mikhail Osinov	Nike	
Rubin	Kazan	(Turkmenistan) Kurban Berdyev	(Russia) Sergei Semak	Nike	
Saturn	Ramenskoye	(Russia) Andrei Gordeyev (Caretaker)	(Russia) Aleksei Igonin	Adidas	
Spartak	Moscow	(Russia) Valeri Karpin (Executive Director)	(Czech Republic) Martin Jiránek	Nike	
Spartak	Nalchik	(Russia) Yuri Krasnozhan	(Montenegro) Miodrag Džudović	Umbro	
Terek	Grozny	(Azerbaijan) Shahin Diniyev (Caretaker)	(Russia) Timur Dzhabrailov	Adidas	SAT&Co Managing Company
Tom	Tomsk	(Russia) Valery Nepomnyashchy	(Estonia) Sergei Pareiko		
Zenit	Saint Petersburg	(Russia) Anatoli Davydov	(Russia) Aleksandr Anyukov	Nike	Gazprom

=== Managerial changes ===
Team	Outgoing manager	Manner of departure	Date of vacancy	Position in table	Replaced by	Date of appointment	Position in table
Amkar	(Montenegro) Miodrag Božović			Preseason	(Bulgaria) Dimitar Dimitrov		Preseason
CSKA	(Russia) Valery Gazzaev			Preseason	(Brazil) Zico	9 January 2009	Preseason
Khimki	(Russia) Sergei Yuran			Preseason	(Russia) Konstantin Sarsania	15 December 2008	Preseason
Moscow	(Ukraine) Oleg Blokhin			Preseason	(Montenegro) Miodrag Božović	28 November 2008	Preseason
Spartak Moscow	(Denmark) Michael Laudrup	Fired	15 April 2009	10th	(Russia) Valeri Karpin (Executive Director)		
Lokomotiv	(Tajikistan) Rashid Rakhimov	Fired	28 April 2009	13th	(Uzbekistan) Vladimir Maminov (Caretaker)	28 April 2009	8th
Saturn	(Germany) Jürgen Röber	Fired	15 May 2009	15th	(Russia) Andrei Gordeyev (Caretaker)	15 May 2009	15th
Saturn	(Russia) Andrei Gordeyev (Caretaker)	End of role	20 May 2009		(Russia) Andrei Gordeyev	20 May 2009	
Lokomotiv	(Uzbekistan) Vladimir Maminov (Caretaker)	End of role	1 June 2009	8th	(Russia) Yuri Semin	1 June 2009	8th
Zenit	(Netherlands) Dick Advocaat	Fired	10 August 2009	8th	(Russia) Anatoli Davydov (Caretaker)	10 August 2009	8th
Kuban	(Russia) Sergei Ovchinnikov	Fired	11 August 2009	14th	(Armenia) Poghos Galstyan (Caretaker)	11 August 2009	14th
Amkar	(Bulgaria) Dimitar Dimitrov	Fired	1 September 2009	13th	(Tajikistan) Rashid Rakhimov	5 September 2009	
CSKA	(Brazil) Zico	Sacked	10 September 2009	4th	(Spain) Juande Ramos	10 September 2009	4th
Khimki	(Russia) Konstantin Sarsania	Resigned	19 September 2009	16th	(Russia) Igor Chugainov (Caretaker)		
Zenit	(Russia) Anatoli Davydov (Caretaker)	End of role	2 October 2009		(Russia) Anatoli Davydov	2 October 2009	
Krylia Sovetov	(Russia) Leonid Slutsky	Resigned	9 October 2009	10th	(Russia) Yuri Gazzaev (Caretaker)	10 October 20009	10th
Terek	(Ukraine) Vyacheslav Hrozny	Resigned	20 October 2009	9th	(Azerbaijan) Shahin Diniyev (Caretaker)	20 October 2009	9th
CSKA	(Spain) Juande Ramos	Mutual Termination	26 October 2009	5th	(Russia) Leonid Slutsky	26 October 2009	5th

== League table ==
Pos	Team	Pld	W	D	L	GF	GA	GD	Pts	Qualification or relegation
1	Rubin Kazan (C)	30	19	6	5	62	21	+41	63	Qualification to Champions League group stage
2	Spartak Moscow	30	17	4	9	61	33	+28	55	Qualification to Champions League group stage
3	Zenit St. Petersburg	30	15	9	6	48	27	+21	54	Qualification to Champions League third qualifying round (Note: Winners of 2009–10 Russian Cup, Zenit, qualified for the Champions League, that means the loser finalists Sibir Novosibirsk will play in third qualifying round of the UEFA Europa League.)
4	Lokomotiv Moscow	30	15	9	6	43	30	+13	54	Qualification to Europa League play-off round
5	CSKA Moscow	30	16	4	10	48	30	+18	52	Qualification to Europa League play-off round
6	FC Moscow (R)	30	13	9	8	39	28	+11	48	Club expelled after season (Note: FC Moscow announced on 5 February 2010 that they will not participate in next season's Russian Premier League. On 17 February, they were officially excluded from the 2010 Russian Premier League.)
7	Saturn	30	13	6	11	38	41	−3	45	
8	Dynamo Moscow	30	12	6	12	31	37	−6	42	
9	Tom Tomsk	30	11	8	11	31	39	−8	41	
10	Krylia Sovetov Samara	30	10	6	14	32	42	−10	36	
11	Spartak Nalchik	30	8	11	11	36	33	+3	35	
12	Terek Grozny	30	9	6	15	33	48	−15	33	
13	Amkar Perm	30	8	9	13	27	37	−10	33	
14	Rostov	30	7	11	12	28	39	−11	32	
15	Kuban Krasnodar (R)	30	6	10	14	23	51	−28	28	Relegation to First Division
16	Khimki (R)	30	2	4	24	20	64	−44	10	Relegation to First Division

Source: RFPL (in Russian)
Rules for classification: 1st points; 2nd matches won; 3rd head-to-head (points, matches won, goal difference, goals scored, away goals scored); 4th goal difference; 5th goals scored; 6th away goals scored; 7th position in previous season or decision game
(C) Champions; (R) Relegated

== Results ==
Home \ Away	AMK	CSK	DYN	KHI	KRY	KUB	LOK	MOS	ROS	RUB	SAT	SPA	SPN	TER	TOM	ZEN
Amkar Perm		0–0	3–1	2–0	2–0	1–0	1–1	0–1	0–0	2–2	0–2	1–2	1–2	1–0	0–0	2–4
CSKA Moscow	1–0		3–0	2–1	3–0	4–0	4–1	1–3	1–2	0–2	3–0	1–2	0–0	1–0	0–1	2–1
Dynamo Moscow	0–0	1–2		3–2	0–1	1–1	0–2	1–0	1–0	0–3	1–0	1–1	2–1	0–1	0–1	1–0
Khimki	2–0	0–3	0–2		1–3	2–2	1–3	1–1	0–1	2–3	1–0	0–3	0–2	1–2	1–3	0–4
Krylia Sovetov Samara	1–0	1–3	3–1	3–0		1–0	1–3	1–1	2–2	1–2	0–2	2–1	0–0	2–0	1–3	0–1
Kuban Krasnodar	1–0	1–0	1–1	2–1	0–0		1–0	3–3	0–0	0–3	0–2	1–0	2–2	1–1	0–0	0–2
Lokomotiv Moscow	1–0	2–1	1–1	1–1	2–1	4–1		1–0	2–0	2–1	2–2	2–1	1–0	4–0	0–0	1–1
FC Moscow	0–2	2–0	1–2	3–0	2–1	4–1	0–0		2–0	1–3	3–1	3–1	0–2	0–0	2–1	1–0
Rostov	1–1	1–0	0–1	2–0	0–0	3–3	1–1	2–2		1–2	1–2	0–1	1–1	1–1	0–0	2–1
Rubin Kazan	1–2	1–2	3–0	2–1	4–1	3–0	2–0	0–0	0–2		5–1	0–2	2–0	4–0	4–0	0–0
Saturn	2–0	0–3	0–0	1–0	3–1	2–1	2–0	0–1	4–0	0–5		2–1	1–0	3–0	0–0	2–2
Spartak Moscow	5–1	2–3	0–2	1–0	1–1	4–0	3–0	2–1	5–1	0–3	4–0		2–0	2–0	5–0	1–1
Spartak Nalchik	4–1	1–1	2–4	0–0	0–1	4–0	0–1	0–0	1–0	0–0	1–1	2–4		4–2	3–0	2–2
Terek Grozny	2–2	1–1	1–0	2–0	3–2	0–1	2–1	1–2	1–3	1–2	1–1	2–3	1–0		4–0	3–2
Tom Tomsk	1–2	2–3	2–3	4–0	0–1	1–0	1–3	0–0	2–1	0–0	3–1	1–1	1–0	2–1		0–3
Zenit St. Petersburg	0–0	2–0	2–1	4–2	2–0	2–0	1–1	1–0	2–0	0–0	2–1	2–1	2–2	2–0	0–2	

Source: RFPL (in Russian)
Legend: Blue = home team win; Yellow = draw; Red = away team win.

== Season statistics ==
=== Top goalscorers ===
As of matches played on 29 November 2009.

Rank	Player	Club	Goal
1	(Brazil) Welliton	Spartak	21
2	(Russia) Aleksandr Bukharov	Rubin	16
2	(Argentina) Alejandro Domínguez	Rubin	16
4	(Russia) Dmitri Sychev	Lokomotiv	13
5	(Russia) Aleksandr Kerzhakov	Dynamo	12
5	(Brazil) Alex	Spartak	12
7	(Russia) Shamil Lakhiyalov	Terek	11
8	(Russia) Vladimir Bystrov	Dynamo / Zenit	10
9	(Czech Republic) Tomáš Necid	CSKA	9
9	(Serbia) Miloš Krasić	CSKA	9
9	(Czech Republic) Jan Koller	Krylia	9

== Awards ==
On 24 November 2009 Russian Football Union named its list of 33 top players:

Goalkeepers

1. (Russia) Igor Akinfeev (CSKA)
2. (Russia) Sergei Ryzhikov (Rubin)
3. (Russia) Vladimir Gabulov (Dynamo)

Right backs

1. (Russia) Aleksandr Anyukov (Zenit)
2. (Russia) Sergei Parshivlyuk (Spartak M.)
3. (Russia) Kirill Nababkin (Moscow)

Right-centre backs

1. (Russia) Roman Sharonov (Rubin)
2. (Russia) Vasili Berezutskiy (CSKA)
3. (Czech Republic) Martin Jiránek (Spartak M.)

Left-centre backs

1. (Russia) Sergei Ignashevich (CSKA)
2. (Spain) César Navas (Rubin)
3. (Russia) Denis Kolodin (Dynamo)

Left backs

1. (Argentina) Cristian Ansaldi (Rubin)
2. (Russia) Renat Yanbaev (Lokomotiv)
3. (Russia) Georgi Schennikov (CSKA)

Defensive midfielders

1. (Russia) Sergei Semak (Rubin)
2. (Russia) Igor Denisov (Zenit)
3. (Russia) Dmitri Khokhlov (Dynamo)

Right wingers

1. (Russia) Vladimir Bystrov (Spartak M. / Zenit)
2. (Serbia) Miloš Krasić (CSKA)
3. (Russia) Aleksandr Samedov (Moscow)

Central midfielders

1. (Brazil) Alex (Spartak M.)
2. (Russia) Alan Dzagoev (CSKA)
3. (Russia) Igor Semshov (Zenit)

Left wingers

1. (Russia) Konstantin Zyryanov (Zenit)
2. (Lithuania) Edgaras Česnauskis (Moscow)
3. (Russia) Aleksandr Ryazantsev (Rubin)

Right forwards

1. (Brazil) Welliton (Spartak M.)
2. (Russia) Aleksandr Bukharov (Rubin)
3. (Turkey) Fatih Tekke (Zenit)

Left forwards

1. (Argentina) Alejandro Domínguez (Rubin)
2. (Russia) Aleksandr Kerzhakov (Dynamo)
3. (Russia) Dmitri Sychev (Lokomotiv)

== Medal squads ==
1. FC Rubin Kazan

Goalkeepers: Sergei Ryzhikov (29), Nukri Revishvili (Georgia (country)) (1).
Defenders: César Navas (Spain) (28), Cristian Ansaldi (Argentina) (25 / 1), Roman Sharonov (25 / 2), Vitali Kaleshin (18), Lasha Salukvadze (Georgia (country)) (10 / 1), Aleksei Popov (10), Dato Kvirkvelia (Georgia (country)) (7), Aleksandr Orekhov (2), Stjepan Tomas (Croatia) (1).
Midfielders: Sergei Semak (26 / 6), Gökdeniz Karadeniz (Turkey) (25 / 6), MacBeth Sibaya (South Africa) (23 / 1), Christian Noboa (Ecuador) (22 / 2), Aleksandr Ryazantsev (18 / 3), Yevgeni Balyaikin (17), Andrei Gorbanets (11), Pyotr Bystrov (11), Alan Kasaev (10 / 1), Rafał Murawski (Poland) (7 / 1), Serhii Rebrov (Ukraine) (7), Makhach Gadzhiyev (1), Aleksei Kotlyarov (1).
Forwards: Alejandro Domínguez (Argentina) (23 / 19), Aleksandr Bukharov (23 / 16), Hasan Kabze (Turkey) (14 / 2), Roman Adamov (13 / 2), Igor Portnyagin (2 / 1), Davron Mirzayev (Uzbekistan) (1).
(league appearances and goals listed in brackets)

Manager: (Turkmenistan) Gurban Berdiýew.

Transferred out during the season: Roman Adamov (on loan to FC Krylia Sovetov Samara), Serhii Rebrov (Ukraine) (retired), Makhach Gadzhiyev (end of loan from FC Saturn Moscow Oblast).

2. FC Spartak Moscow

Goalkeepers: Soslan Dzhanayev (26), Stipe Pletikosa (Croatia) (4).
Defenders: Martin Jiránek (Czech Republic) (29 / 1), Sergei Parshivlyuk (21 / 1), Martin Stranzl (Austria) (19 / 1), Malik Fathi (Germany) (16 / 3), Fyodor Kudryashov (7), Clemente Rodríguez (Argentina) (7), Egor Filipenko (Belarus) (5 / 1), Ignas Dedura (Lithuania) (4).
Midfielders: Alex (Brazil) (29 / 12), Rafael Carioca (Brazil) (23), Yevgeni Makeyev (20 / 2), Vladimir Bystrov (18 / 4), Denis Boyarintsev (18), Renat Sabitov (17), Serghei Covalciuc (Moldova) (16), Ivan Saenko (13 / 1), Aleksandr Pavlenko (10), Zhano Ananidze (Georgia (country)) (8 / 2), Quincy (Ghana) (8 / 2), Ibson (Brazil) (6), Vladislav Ryzhkov (4), Maksim Grigoryev (3), Artur Maloyan (3), Igor Gorbatenko (2).
Forwards: Welliton (Brazil) (28 / 21), Nikita Bazhenov (22 / 2), Pavel Yakovlev (14 / 4), Artyom Dzyuba (8 / 2), Eldar Nizamutdinov (5 / 1).

Manager: Michael Laudrup (Denmark) (until April), Valery Karpin (from April).

Transferred out during the season: Vladimir Bystrov (to FC Zenit St. Petersburg), Aleksandr Pavlenko (on loan to FC Rostov), Artyom Dzyuba (on loan to FC Tom Tomsk), Clemente Rodríguez (Argentina) (to (Argentina) Estudiantes de La Plata), Artur Maloyan (on loan to FC Anzhi Makhachkala).

3. FC Zenit St. Petersburg

Goalkeepers: Vyacheslav Malafeev (28), Kamil Čontofalský (Slovakia) (2).
Defenders: Aleksandr Anyukov (27 / 1), Fernando Meira (Portugal) (22 / 1), Ivica Križanac (Croatia) (18 / 2), Kim Dong-Jin (South Korea) (17 / 1), Nicolas Lombaerts (Belgium) (15 / 2), Tomáš Hubočan (Slovakia) (10).
Midfielders: Konstantin Zyryanov (30 / 4), Igor Denisov (28 / 1), Igor Semshov (26 / 6), Roman Shirokov (21 / 1), Szabolcs Huszti (Hungary) (19 / 2), Radek Šírl (Czech Republic) (17), Viktor Fayzulin (16), Anatoliy Tymoshchuk (Ukraine) (11), Vladimir Bystrov (10 / 6), Aleksei Ionov (10), Alessandro Rosina (Italy) (9 / 2), Danny (Portugal) (8).
Forwards: Fatih Tekke (Turkey) (20 / 8), Pavel Pogrebnyak (15 / 5), Sergei Kornilenko (Belarus) (11 / 1), Mateja Kežman (Serbia) (10 / 2), Maksim Kanunnikov (1).
Manager: Dick Advocaat (Netherlands) (until August), Anatoli Davydov (from August).

Transferred out during the season: Pavel Pogrebnyak (to (Germany) VfB Stuttgart), Anatoliy Tymoshchuk (Ukraine) (to (Germany) FC Bayern Munich).

== Attendances ==
Rank	Club	Average
1	Spartak Moscow	25,253
2	Zenit	18,910
3	Kuban	18,467
4	Krylia Sovetov	15,873
5	Lokomotiv Moscow	15,288
6	Rubin	14,726
7	PFC CSKA	13,687
8	Amkar	12,073
9	Tom	11,833
10	Rostov	11,597
11	Spartak Nalchik	9,793
12	Terek	8,020
13	Dynamo Moscow	7,752
14	Saturn	7,173
15	FC Moscow	4,940
16	Khimki	4,881

== See also ==
- 2009 Russian First Division
- 2008–09 Russian Cup
- List of Russian football transfers summer 2009
