= Trud Stadium (Podolsk) =

Stadium in Podolsk, Russia

Coordinates: 51.3066°N 37.8152°E

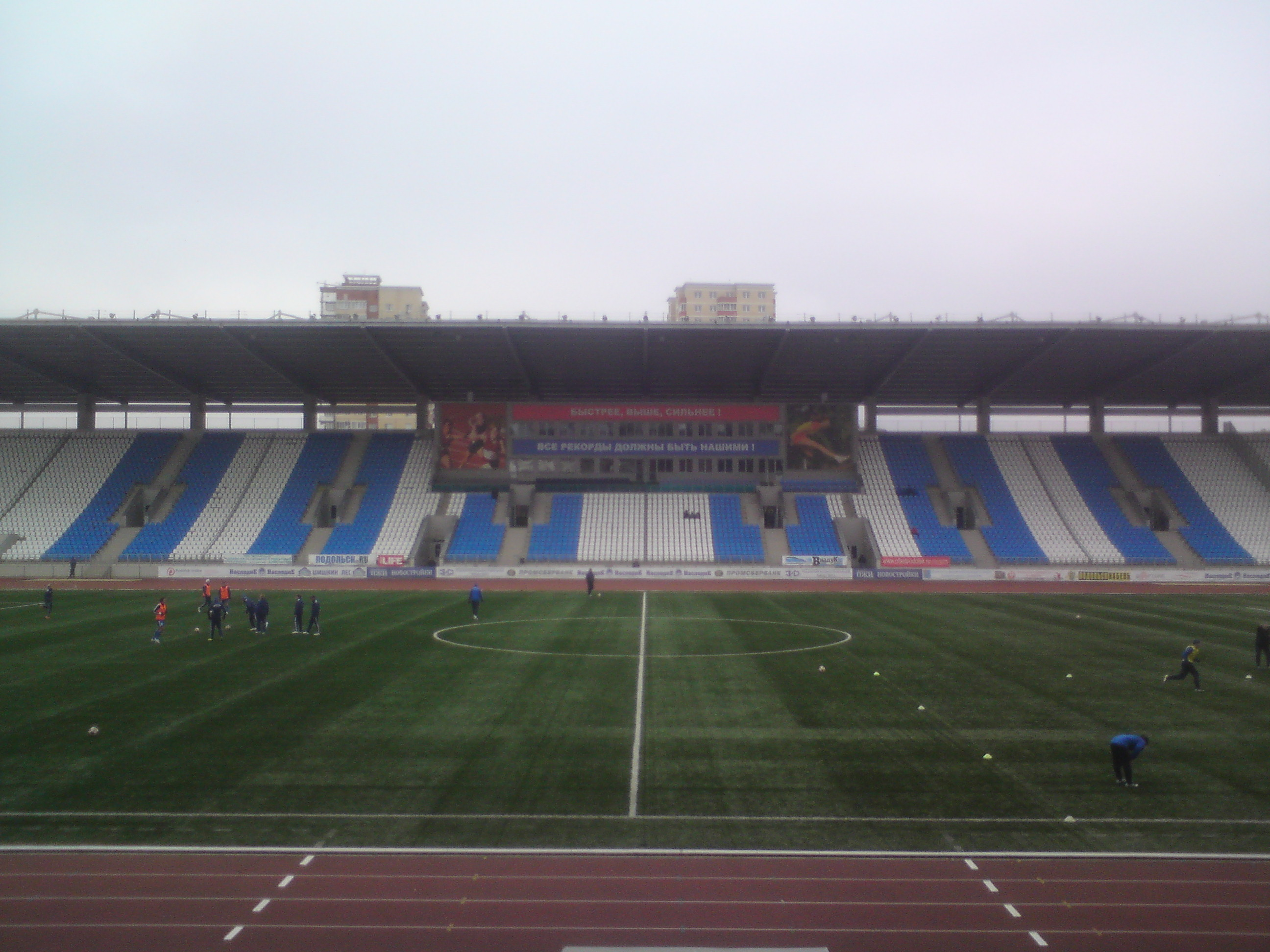
- Interactive map of Trud Stadium (Podolsk)
- Location: Podolsk, Russia
- Owner: Urban Okrug Podolsk
- Capacity: 11,962
- Surface: Artificial
- Field size: 105 x 68 m

Construction
- Opened: 1961
- Renovated: 2008
- Cost: 100 000 000 $

Tenants
- FC Vityaz Podolsk (2009, 2011– June 2017, 2018-2019 (mainly), 2020 (selected matches)); FC Avangard Podolsk (2009), PFC CSKA Moscow (2014, single match); Russia women's national football team (selected matches); WFC Podolchanka; FC Kaluga (2024)

The Trud Stadium is a multi-purpose stadium in Podolsk, Russia. It is currently used mostly for football matches and was the main home ground of FC Vityaz Podolsk from 2009 to present time, FC Avangard Podolsk in 2009 PFC CSKA Moscow in 2014 due to disqualification of Arena Khimki for single match of the Russian Cup. and women's football club Podolchanka. The stadium holds 11,962.

== History ==
The stadium in Podolsk was opened in 1961. With initial capacity of 22,500 spectators it was the biggest stadium of Moscow Oblast at the time. In 1980 the stadium was a part of Olympic torch relay. In 1996 the stadium was closed for reconstruction, which ended in September 2008. The first match after reopening took place on March 28th, 2009. It was the game between Vityaz Podolsk and FC Nosta Novotroitsk, finished 2-1.

== International matches ==
Trud Stadium has hosted several international matches, listed below:

Date	Competition	Home team	Away team	Score
22/03/2012	2011–12 UEFA Women's Champions League	WFC Rossiyanka	1. FFC Turbine Potsdam	0:3
04/04/2012	UEFA Women's Euro 2013 Qualifiers	Russia	Italy	0:2
