= Dušan Anđelković =

Serbian footballer

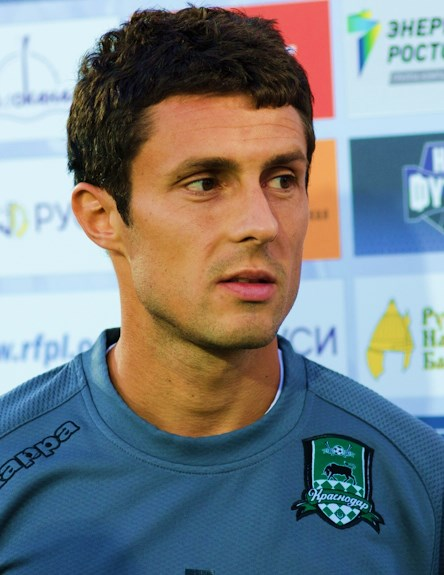
- Anđelković with Krasnodar in 2013

Personal information
- Full name: Dušan Anđelković
- Date of birth: 15 June 1982 (age 44)
- Place of birth: Kraljevo, SR Serbia, Yugoslavia
- Height: 1.72 m (5 ft 8 in)
- Position: Left-back

Senior career*
Years	Team	Apps	(Gls)
2001–2002	Sloga Kraljevo	38	(4)
2003–2004	Mladost Lučani	42	(17)
2004–2005	Radnički Beograd	29	(5)
2005–2006	Voždovac	17	(1)
2006	→ Red Star Belgrade (loan)	3	(0)
2006–2008	Red Star Belgrade	52	(1)
2008	Kocaelispor	5	(0)
2009–2010	Rostov	51	(1)
2011–2014	Krasnodar	66	(1)
2015–2018	Red Star Belgrade	53	(5)
Total		356	(35)

International career
2007	Serbia	1	(0)
- * Club domestic league appearances and goals

Dušan Anđelković (Serbian Cyrillic: Душан Анђелковић; born 15 June 1982) is a Serbian retired footballer who played as a defender.

== Club career ==
Anđelković started out at Sloga Kraljevo, before moving to Mladost Lučani. He made his top flight debut with Radnički Beograd in the 2004–05 season. After spending six months at Voždovac, Anđelković was transferred on loan to Red Star Belgrade in January 2006. He eventually signed for the club on a permanent basis, staying there for two more seasons, before moving abroad.

In fall 2008, Anđelković briefly played for Turkish club Kocaelispor. He subsequently moved to Russia and signed for Rostov in January 2009. Two years later, Anđelković joined Russian Premier League newcomers Krasnodar. He left the club at the end of the 2013–14 season.

In the 2015 winter transfer window, Anđelković returned to his former club Red Star Belgrade. He was named in the league's team of the season for 2016–17. In April 2018, Anđelković announced his plans to retire at the end of the season.

== International career ==
Anđelković earned one cap for Serbia, playing the full 90 minutes in a 1–0 UEFA Euro 2008 qualifier win over Kazakhstan on 24 November 2007.

== Honours ==
=== Club ===
Red Star Belgrade

- Serbian SuperLiga: 2005–06, 2006–07, 2015–16, 2017–18
- Serbian Cup: 2005–06, 2006–07

=== Individual ===
- Serbian SuperLiga Team of the Season: 2016–17
