= Astemir Sheriyev =

Russian footballer

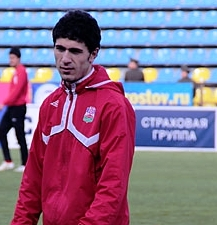

Personal information
- Full name: Astemir Mukhamedovich Sheriyev
- Date of birth: 23 February 1990 (age 36)
- Height: 1.88 m (6 ft 2 in)
- Positions: Defender; midfielder

Senior career*
Years	Team	Apps	(Gls)
2006	Megafon-Kavkaz Nalchik (D4)		
2007–2009	Spartak Nalchik	0	(0)
2009–2010	Rostov	9	(0)
2010	→ FC Nizhny Novgorod (loan)	3	(0)
2011–2012	Spartak Nalchik	0	(0)
- * Club domestic league appearances and goals

Astemir Mukhamedovich Sheriyev (Russian: Астемир Мухамедович Шериев; born February 23, 1990) is a former Russian footballer.

== Career ==
Sheriyev made his professional debut for Spartak Nalchik on August 6, 2008 in the Russian Cup game against Vityaz.

In the summer of 2009, he moved to Rostov, where on September 19, 2009 he played his first Russian Premier League game against Kuban. In March 2010 FC Rostov loaned the defender to FC Nizhny Novgorod for one season.
