= FC Abinsk =

Russian football club

- Full name: Football Club Abinsk
- Founded: 2008
- Ground: Abinsk Stadium
- Chairman: Ishkhan Asatryan
- Manager: Kalin Stepanyan
- League: Russian Second Division, Zone South
- 2009: excluded

FC Abinsk (Russian: ФК Абинск) is a Russian football club from Abinsk, founded in 2008. In its first year of existence, FC Abinsk came 1st in the South zone of the Amateur Football League and advanced to the Russian Second Division for 2009.

On July 8, 2009, the club was removed from the Russian Second Division for not coming to a second scheduled game. All their results were annulled and removed from the competition record.
