= Andrei Sklyarov =

Russian footballer

Personal information
- Full name: Andrey Vladimirovich Sklyarov
- Date of birth: 30 September 1989 (age 37)
- Height: 1.82 m (6 ft 0 in)
- Position: Defender

Youth career
- 2002–2007: FC Rostov

Senior career*
Years	Team	Apps	(Gls)
2008	TP-47	14	(0)
2009	FC Rostov	1	(0)
2010	FC Gubkin	3	(0)
2011–2012	FC MITOS Novocherkassk	4	(0)
- * Club domestic league appearances and goals

Andrei Vladimirovich Sklyarov (Russian: Андрей Владимирович Скляров; born 30 September 1989) is a Russian former professional footballer.

== Club career ==
He made his debut in the Russian Premier League on 25 July 2009 in a game against FC Tom Tomsk.
