= Artur Valikayev =

Russian footballer

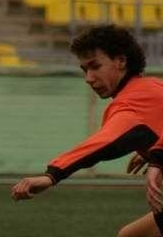
- Artur Valikaev in 2008

Personal information
- Full name: Artur Rifovich Valikayev
- Date of birth: 8 January 1988 (age 38)
- Place of birth: Sterlitamak, Bashkortostan, Russian SFSR, Soviet Union
- Height: 1.85 m (6 ft 1 in)
- Position: Defensive midfielder

Senior career*
Years	Team	Apps	(Gls)
2006–2007	Sodovik Sterlitamak	26	(0)
2008	Ural Sverdlovsk Oblast	17	(0)
2009	Nizhny Novgorod	4	(0)
2009–2010	Rostov	13	(1)
2011	Spartak Moscow	3	(0)
2011	→ Amkar Perm (loan)	2	(0)
2012–2013	Shinnik Yaroslavl	36	(2)
2013–2014	Ufa	31	(3)
2014–2015	Tom Tomsk	4	(0)
2015	→ Khimik Dzerzhinsk (loan)	10	(1)
2016	Sakhalin Yuzhno-Sakhalinsk	6	(1)
2016–2017	Nõmme Kalju	45	(11)
2018	Olympiakos Nicosia	9	(0)
2018	Bugulma-RUNAKO Bugulma	15	(4)
2019	Dordoi Bishkek	5	(1)
2020	Dynamo Bryansk	13	(0)
2021	Smorgon	8	(0)

International career
2009–2010	Russia U21	5	(0)
- * Club domestic league appearances and goals as of 17 June 2021

Artur Rifovich Valikayev (Russian: Артур Рифович Валикаев; born 8 January 1988) is a Russian former professional footballer.

== Club career ==
He made his professional debut in the Russian First Division in 2007 for FC Sodovik Sterlitamak.

On 2 March 2019, Valikayev joined Dordoi Bishkek on trial, being unveiled as a new signing for the club on 5 March 2019.
