= Ivan Starkov =

Russian footballer

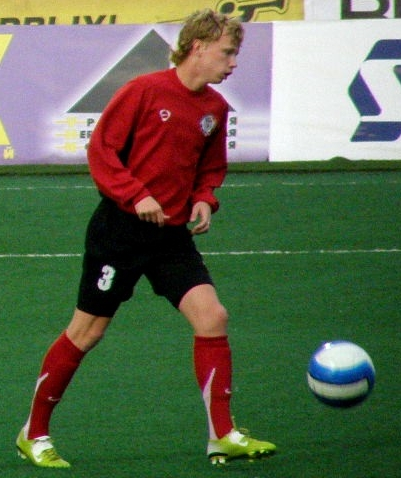

Personal information
- Full name: Ivan Yevgenyevich Starkov
- Date of birth: 10 January 1986 (age 40)
- Place of birth: Barnaul, Soviet Union
- Height: 1.78 m (5 ft 10 in)
- Position: Midfielder

Youth career
- FC Dynamo Barnaul
- 2001–2003: FC Lokomotiv Moscow

Senior career*
Years	Team	Apps	(Gls)
2004	FC Titan Moscow	24	(4)
2005–2007	FC Lokomotiv Moscow	12	(2)
2007	→ FC Rostov (loan)	4	(1)
2008–2009	FC Amkar Perm	30	(3)
2009	→ FC Khimki (loan)	8	(0)
2010	FC SKA-Energiya Khabarovsk	24	(0)
2011–2013	FC Dynamo Barnaul	32	(3)
2013	FC Neftekhimik Nizhnekamsk	6	(0)
2014	FC Baikal Irkutsk	22	(3)
2015–2018	FC Dynamo Barnaul	60	(7)

International career
2007–2008	Russia U-21	2	(1)
- * Club domestic league appearances and goals

Ivan Yevgenyevich Starkov (Russian: Иван Евгеньевич Старков; born 10 January 1986) is a Russian football manager and a former player.

Outside his hometown of Barnaul, where is part of FC Dynamo Barnaul's hall of fame, he is best known for his time with Lokomotiv Moscow and Amkar Perm. A left-footed player, he usually appeared on the left side of the pitch, either as a winger or as a wing-back.

== Career ==
Born and raised in Barnaul, Altai Krai, Starkov was introduced to football in early childhood by his father, an avid football fan and supporter of Lokomotiv Moscow. Having spent a number of seasons at the Dynamo Barnaul's academy, Starkov moved to Moscow at the age of 14 and joined the academy of his favorite FC Lokomotiv, with Sergei Scherbakov having arranged a week-long tryout for him.

In 2004, Starkov went on a year-long loan to FC Titan Moscow, playing his first season of senior football in the third-tier league. In 2005, he returned to Lokomotiv and played for the reserves. On 13 July 2005, Starkov made his debut for the first team, playing 90 minutes in a 2–0 Russia Cup win against FC MetKuz. On 12 November 2005, he played another 90 minutes against the same opposition in the return leg, ending in a 1–1 draw.

In 2006, aged 20, Starkov was promoted to the first team by the newly appointed manager Slavoljub Muslin. On 26 March 2006, Starkov made his debut in the Russian Premier League with the record-breaking appearance off the bench; having come on as a substitute at the 60th minute, Starkov scored his debut goal in just 6 seconds, equalizing the score in the eventual 1–1 away draw against FC Luch. Dmitri Loskov, the team captain and his favorite Russian player as a child, provided an assist to his volley shot from just outside the penalty area.

== Honours ==
- Russian Premier League bronze: 2006.
