= FC Nika Krasny Sulin =

- Full name: Football Club Nika Krasny Sulin
- Founded: 1908
- Dissolved: 2009
- League: Russian Second Division, Zone South
- 2008: 11th

FC Nika Krasny Sulin (Russian: «Ника» (Красный Сулин)) was a Russian football team from Krasny Sulin. It played professionally in 1968–1970, 1992–1997 and 2008. Their best result was 11th place in the Zone South of the Russian Second Division in 2008.

== Team name history ==
- 1908–2001: FC Metallurg Krasny Sulin
- 2007–2008: FC Nika Krasny Sulin
