= Mikhail Osinov =

Russian footballer

Mikhail Osinov Михаил Осинов
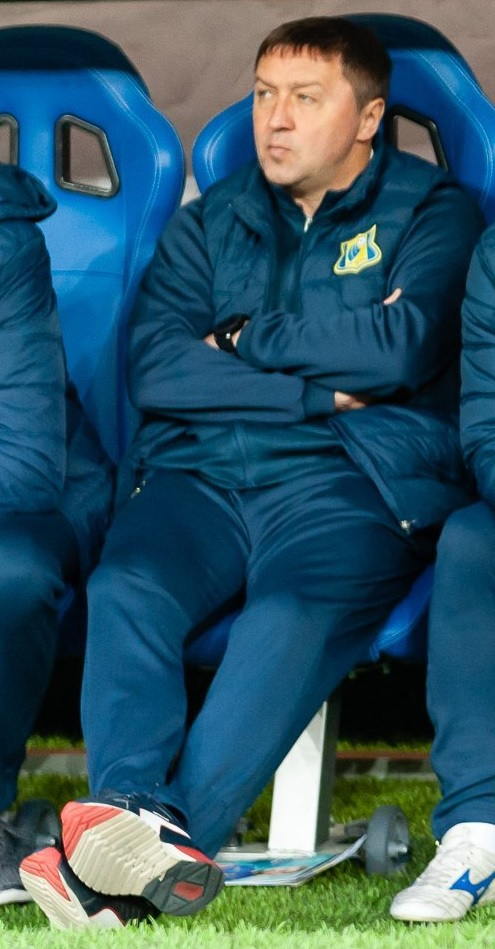
- Osinov coaching FC Rostov in 2019

Personal information
- Full name: Mikhail Svyatoslavovich Osinov
- Date of birth: 8 October 1975 (age 51)
- Place of birth: Arti, Sverdlovsk Oblast, Soviet Union
- Height: 1.80 m (5 ft 11 in)
- Position: Midfielder

Team information
- Current team: FC Rostov (assistant coach)

Senior career*
Years	Team	Apps	(Gls)
1993	Gornyak	41	(12)
1994–1995	Uralets	65	(10)
1996–1997	Uralmash	60	(7)
1997–1998	Maccabi Tel Aviv	9	(0)
1998–2000	Rotor	73	(7)
2001–2009	FC Rostov	239	(51)
2010	FC Ural Sverdlovsk Oblast	22	(1)
2011–2012	FC MITOS Novocherkassk	33	(10)

International career
1996–1998	Russia U-21	8	(0)

Managerial career
- 2017–2018: FC Rostov (U-21 assistant)
- 2018–2019: FC Rostov (U-21)
- 2019–: FC Rostov (assistant)
- * Club domestic league appearances and goals

Mikhail Svyatoslavovich Osinov (Russian: Михаил Святославович Осинов; born 8 October 1975) is a Russian football coach and a former midfielder. He works as an assistant coach with FC Rostov.

== Career ==
Born in Arti, Sverdlovsk Oblast, Mikhail Osinov started his professional career at the Gornyak Kachkanar in 1993. In 1994-1995, he played for Uralets Nizhny Tagil. Next year, Osinov was invited to Uralmash, the biggest club in the region.

After two seasons in Yekaterinburg, Osinov moved to Israel for a spell with Maccabi Tel Aviv. He later returned to the Russian Top Division side Rotor Volgograd.

In 2001, Osinov was transferred to FC Rostov and stayed there for 9 years, suffering a relegation and helping the yellow-blues to return to the Premier League. He also holds the club record for league appearances with 239 games.

In 2010, he returned to Yekaterinburg to play in the Russian First Division. In 2011, Osinov went to a lower league joining MITOS Novocherkassk of the Russian Second Division.

On 11 September 2011, in a league game against Olimpia Gelendzhik Osinov scored a goal that some sources consider the fastest in the history of the game, at 2.68 seconds from kickoff.

== Honours ==
- 2008 Russian First Division winner
- 2002–03 Russian Cup runner-up
- 2008 Russian First Division best player

== Personal life ==
His son Mikhail is a professional footballer.
