= FC Avangard Podolsk =

Russian football club

- Full name: Football Club Avangard Podolsk
- Founded: 2001 (or 1947 )
- Dissolved: 2010 (merging)
- Ground: Planeta Stadium, Trud Stadium
- Capacity: 3,120, 11,962
- Chairman: Vladislav Ovchar
- Manager: Andrei Romanov
- League: Russian Second Division, Zone Center
- 2010: 5th

FC Avangard Podolsk (Russian: ФК «Авангард» Подольск) was a Russian association football club from Podolsk, existed in 2001–2010. The club played in the Russian Second Division in 2009–2010. In the past, the club was called FC Vityaz-2 Podolsk (2001–2005) and FC ZIO-Podolsk (2006–2007). In December 2010 it merged with FC Vityaz Podolsk.
