= FC Stavropolye-2009 =

- Full name: Football Club Stavropolye-2009 Stavropolye
- Founded: 2009
- Dissolved: 2010
- Ground: Dynamo Stadium
- Capacity: 16,000
- 2009: Russian Second Division, Zone South13th

FC Stavropolye-2009 (Russian: ФК Ставрополье-2009) was a Russian football club based in Stavropol and formally representing the whole Stavropol Krai, founded in 2009. In 2009, it played in the Russian Second Division. It took over the license of FC Dynamo Stavropol, which experienced financial difficulties. For the 2010 season, the club was transformed to a new version of FC Dynamo Stavropol.
