= FC Vityaz Podolsk =

Russian football club

- Full name: Football Club Vityaz Podolsk
- Nickname(s): Vityazi (Knights)
- Founded: 1996; 29 years ago (as FC Vityaz); 2022; 3 years ago (as SSh Vityaz) (refounded)
- Dissolved: 2025
- Ground: Trud Stadium, Podolsk; Planeta Stadium; Zenit Stadium
- Capacity: 11,962; 3,120; 250
- Owner: 13 people
- Chairman: Sergei Lalakin; Yury Polyakov (director)
- League: Moscow region championship, League A (D4)
- 2016–17: Russian Professional Football League; Zone Center, 5th
- Website: http://www.fcvityaz.ru
Home colours	Away colours

FC Vityaz Podolsk is a Russian football club based in Podolsk that played in the Russian First Division in 2009.

The club was founded in 1996 as a non-professional team. The current team was formed in 2000 and in 2001 it turned professional. The uniforms are all black for home and away games. The club was promoted from the "Center" Zone of the Russian Second Division as champions in the 2007 season.

On 23 December 2009 they gave up their spot in the Russian First Division due to financial difficulties. They played in the Russian Second Division in 2010.

In December 2010 Vityaz merged with FC Avangard Podolsk, the united club is named Vityaz. Before the 2017–18 season, due to financial difficulties the club did not apply for the professional license to participate in the Russian Professional Football League.
