= List of Russian football transfers winter 2009–10 =

This is a list of Russian football transfers in the winter transfer window 2009–10 by club. Only clubs of the 2010 Russian Premier League are included.

== Alania Vladikavkaz ==
In: Note: Flags indicate national team as defined under FIFA eligibility rules; some limited exceptions apply. Players may hold more than one non-FIFA nationality.

No.	Pos.	Nation	Player
4	DF	FIN	Boris Rotenberg (on loan from Zenit Saint Petersburg)
5	MF	ROU	Gheorghe Florescu (on loan from (Denmark) Midtjylland)
6	MF	NGA	Sani Kaita (on loan from (France) Monaco)
7	FW	RUS	Karen Oganyan (from Volgar-Gazprom-2 Astrakhan)
8	FW	RUS	Georgy Gabulov (from Lokomotiv-2 Moscow)
9	MF	RUS	Arsen Khubulov (from Avtodor Vladikavkaz)
10	MF	BIH	Zajko Zeba (from KAMAZ Naberezhnye Chelny)
14	FW	RUS	Aleksandr Marenich (from Moscow)
15	MF	RUS	Aslan Mashukov (from Spartak Nalchik)
16	GK	RUS	Dmitri Khomich (from Spartak Moscow)
20	DF	CIV	Dacosta Goore (from Moscow)
24	DF	TOG	Abdoul-Gafar Mamah (from (Moldova) Sheriff Tiraspol)
25	DF	BUL	Ivan Ivanov (from (Bulgaria) CSKA Sofia)
31	FW	RUS	Eldar Nizamutdinov (on loan from Khimki)
32	DF	ANG	Francisco Zuela (on loan from Kuban Krasnodar)
34	DF	RUS	Nariman Gusalov
35	DF	RUS	Aslan Doguzov (from Avtodor Vladikavkaz)
36	DF	RUS	Alan Soltanov
37	MF	RUS	Artur Gadzaev
38	GK	RUS	Omar Tsopanov
39	DF	RUS	Soslan Kachmazov
40	MF	RUS	Atsamaz Kumalagov
41	GK	RUS	Mikhail Kerzhakov (on loan from Zenit Saint Petersburg)
42	MF	RUS	Yuri Kirillov (on loan from Dynamo Moscow)
43	DF	RUS	David Bugulov
44	MF	RUS	Georgi Dzantiyev
45	MF	RUS	Georgi Bulatsev
46	DF	RUS	Albert Tskhovrebov
47	FW	RUS	Artur Khaymanov (free agent in 2009, last team – Alania in 2008)
48	MF	RUS	Oleg Tigiyev (from Academia Dimitrovgrad)
51	MF	RUS	Artur Gazdanov (from CSKA Moscow youth)
52	FW	RUS	Georgy Gogichayev (from Smena-Zenit St. Petersburg)
53	GK	RUS	Oleg Kudzhiyev
54	MF	RUS	Uruzmag Ikoev
55	FW	RUS	Alan Alborov (from Avtodor Vladikavkaz)
73	MF	BUL	Ivan Stoyanov (from (Bulgaria) CSKA Sofia)
79	FW	UKR	Serhiy Kuznetsov (on loan from (Ukraine) Karpaty Lviv)
88	DF	RUS	Alan Bagayev (from Amkar Perm)

Out: Note: Flags indicate national team as defined under FIFA eligibility rules; some limited exceptions apply. Players may hold more than one non-FIFA nationality.

No.	Pos.	Nation	Player
33	MF	RUS	Aleksandr Gagloyev (on loan to Neftekhimik Nizhnekamsk)
37	MF	RUS	Artur Gadzaov (to Amkar Perm)
—	GK	RUS	David Gigolayev
—	GK	MDA	Serghei Paşcenco (to (Moldova) Dinamo Bender)
—	GK	UKR	Mykola Tsygan (to Krylia Sovetov Samara)
—	DF	RUS	Dmitri Godunok (to Akademiya Togliatti)
—	DF	RUS	Mikhail Mischenko (end of loan from Rubin Kazan)
—	DF	UKR	Andriy Proshyn (to Rostov)
—	DF	BLR	Sergei Shtanyuk (retired)
—	DF	SRB	Nikola Valentić (to Sibir Novosibirsk)
—	DF	RUS	Tamerlan Varziyev (to Volgar-Gazprom Astrakhan)
—	MF	POR	Paulo Adriano
—	MF	RUS	Amzor Ailarov (to FC Salyut Belgorod)
—	MF	CZE	Tomáš Čížek (to (Czech Republic) Baumit Jablonec)
—	MF	RUS	Soslan Dzhioyev (on loan to Neftekhimik Nizhnekamsk)
—	FW	RUS	Dmitri Ryzhov (end of loan from CSKA Moscow)
—	FW	RUS	Elbrus Tandelov (to FC Mordovia Saransk)
—	FW	RUS	Aleksandr Yarkin (end of loan from Rubin Kazan)

== Amkar Perm ==
In: Note: Flags indicate national team as defined under FIFA eligibility rules; some limited exceptions apply. Players may hold more than one non-FIFA nationality.

No.	Pos.	Nation	Player
6	MF	UKR	Denys Dedechko (from (Ukraine) Dynamo Kyiv, previously on loan at Luch-Energiya Vladivostok)
10	MF	RUS	Andrei Topchu (from Kuban Krasnodar)
18	FW	RUS	Nikita Burmistrov (from CSKA Moscow)
19	MF	RUS	Aleksandr Kolomeytsev (from Moscow)
22	FW	RUS	Azamat Kurachinov (from Stavropol)
24	DF	RUS	Aleksei Popov (from Rubin Kazan)
30	FW	RUS	Timofei Berdyshev (from FC Astrakhan)
31	FW	BRA	Vito (from (Italy) Frosinone)
33	MF	CRO	Josip Knežević (from (Croatia) Osijek)
35	MF	RUS	Artur Gadzaov (from Alania Vladikavkaz)
37	DF	RUS	Kirill Moryganov (from Torpedo-ZIL Moscow)
47	FW	RUS	Anton Romanenko
50	DF	RUS	Mikhail Smirnov (free agent in 2009, last club (Russia) Zenit St. Petersburg in 2008)
55	FW	RUS	Ilya Kolpakov
58	GK	RUS	Dmitri Yershov (from Moscow)
87	MF	RUS	Roman Chernyshev (from Sportakademklub Moscow)
91	DF	RUS	Artyom Moryganov (from Torpedo-ZIL Moscow)
98	DF	RUS	Andrey Blyndu (from Smena-Zenit)

Out: Note: Flags indicate national team as defined under FIFA eligibility rules; some limited exceptions apply. Players may hold more than one non-FIFA nationality.

No.	Pos.	Nation	Player
3	MF	RUS	Ivan Starkov (to SKA-Energiya Khabarovsk, previously on loan at (Russia) Khimki)
6	MF	BUL	Dimitar Telkiyski (to (Bulgaria) Levski Sofia)
17	FW	BRA	Jean Carlos (on loan to Shinnik Yaroslavl)
17	MF	RUS	David Dzakhov (on loan to Volgar-Gazprom Astrakhan)
18	MF	MNE	Nikola Drinčić (to Spartak Moscow)
19	FW	RUS	Nikolai Zhilyayev (to Kuban Krasnodar)
20	FW	CRO	Edin Junuzović (on loan to Dynamo Bryansk)
22	MF	BRA	William (on loan to Shinnik Yaroslavl)
24	MF	CRO	Stjepan Babić (to (Croatia) Zagreb)
25	DF	RUS	Aleksei Yepifanov (to Rotor Volgograd)
26	MF	BLR	Mikhail Afanasyev (to Kuban Krasnodar)
33	MF	LTU	Marius Papšys (to (Lithuania) Vilnius)
35	MF	RUS	Vladislav Lokhonov
36	DF	RUS	Dmitry Lokhonov
49	MF	RUS	Konstantin Pogadayev
70	MF	RUS	Vladimir Paskayants (to Chernomorets Novorossiysk)
80	DF	RUS	Alan Bagayev (to Alania Vladikavkaz)
91	FW	RUS	Mikhail Bilaonov (to Spartak Nalchik)
99	FW	SRB	Predrag Sikimic (to Ural Sverdlovsk Oblast)
—	MF	TKM	Vyacheslav Krendelyov (to Baltika Kaliningrad, previously on loan at Metallurg Lipetsk)
—	DF	ARM	Arthur Stepanyan (to Gazovik Orenburg, previously on loan at Tyumen)

== Anzhi Makhachkala ==
In: Note: Flags indicate national team as defined under FIFA eligibility rules; some limited exceptions apply. Players may hold more than one non-FIFA nationality.

No.	Pos.	Nation	Player
2	DF	GEO	Dato Kvirkvelia (on loan from Rubin Kazan)
4	DF	AZE	Mahir Shukurov (from (Azerbaijan) Inter Baku)
8	MF	RUS	Andrei Streltsov (from Khimki)
17	FW	CZE	Jan Holenda (from (Czech Republic) Sparta Prague)
21	FW	GEO	Giorgi Iluridze (from (Georgia (country)) Dinamo Tbilisi)
27	MF	RUS	Murtazali Abdulayev
29	GK	GEO	Nukri Revishvili (from Rubin Kazan)
30	GK	RUS	Mekhti Dzhenetov (from FC Makhachkala (D4))
31	DF	SRB	Mitar Peković (from (Serbia) Vojvodina)
32	FW	GEO	Revazi Barabadze (free agent, last club – Anzhi in 2008)
33	FW	RUS	Shamil Mirzayev (from FC Makhachkala (D4))
35	MF	RUS	Makhach Ispagiyev (free agent, last club – (Russia) Anzhi-Bekenez Makhachkala)
40	MF	RUS	Azamat Ibragimov (from Dagdizel Kaspiysk)
43	MF	RUS	Salimkhan Dzhamiliyev
44	DF	RUS	Mikail Zaytsev (from Dagdizel Kaspiysk)
61	MF	RUS	Magomed Mirzabekov (from Torpedo-ZIL Moscow)
86	MF	BUL	Todor Timonov (from (Bulgaria) CSKA Sofia)
88	DF	RUS	Murad Kurbanov (from FC Makhachkala (D4))
89	DF	RUS	Akhmad Magomedov
90	DF	RUS	Gamzat Omarov
91	DF	RUS	Anvar Ibragimgadzhiyev (from Academia Dimitrovgrad)
92	MF	RUS	Mikhail Abakarov
93	MF	RUS	Ruslan Aliyev (from Angusht Nazran)
94	DF	RUS	Ruslan Perepelyukov (on loan from CSKA Moscow)
96	MF	RUS	Sharif Mukhammad (free agent, last team – (Russia) Dynamo Makhachkala)
97	MF	RUS	Gadzhi Gadzhiyev (from FSA Voronezh)
98	MF	RUS	Gamzat Makhmudov
99	GK	RUS	Abdulla Gadzhikadiyev

Out: Note: Flags indicate national team as defined under FIFA eligibility rules; some limited exceptions apply. Players may hold more than one non-FIFA nationality.

No.	Pos.	Nation	Player
2	DF	GEO	Kakhaber Aladashvili
4	DF	RUS	Oleg Malyukov (to Kuban Krasnodar)
5	DF	RUS	Valerian Bestayev
8	MF	RUS	Daniil Gridnev (to Krylia Sovetov Samara)
22	DF	GEO	Giorgi Navalovski (on loan to (Azerbaijan) Inter Baku)
23	FW	GEO	Sandro Iashvili (on loan to (Georgia (country)) Olimpi Rustavi)
24	FW	RUS	Aleksandr Danishevsky (to Zhemchuzhina-Sochi)
32	DF	GEO	Edik Sadzhaya (to Volga Nizhny Novgorod)
33	MF	RUS	Artur Maloyan (end of loan from Spartak Moscow)
36	MF	RUS	Alan Kusov (to Torpedo Moscow)
41	MF	RUS	Konstantin Sovetkin (end of loan from Spartak Moscow)
55	DF	RUS	Anton Vlasov (end of loan from CSKA Moscow)
55	DF	MAR	Youssef Rabeh (to (Morocco) Moghreb Tétouan, previously at (Bulgaria) Levski Sofia)
75	GK	RUS	Viktor Chakrygin
77	FW	GEO	Otar Martsvaladze (on loan to Volga Nizhny Novgorod)

== CSKA Moscow ==
In: Note: Flags indicate national team as defined under FIFA eligibility rules; some limited exceptions apply. Players may hold more than one non-FIFA nationality.

No.	Pos.	Nation	Player
1	GK	RUS	Sergei Chepchugov (from Sibir Novosibirsk)
7	MF	JPN	Keisuke Honda (from (Netherlands) VVV-Venlo)
14	DF	RUS	Kirill Nababkin (from Moscow)
26	MF	NGA	Sekou Oliseh (from (Denmark) Midtjylland, previously on loan)
31	DF	RUS	Andrei Vasyanovich (from Moscow)
32	MF	RUS	Kirill Lapidus (from Moscow)
36	MF	RUS	Yegor Ivanov
38	GK	RUS	Vyacheslav Isupov
43	MF	RUS	Leonid Mushnikov
45	MF	RUS	Anton Rukavishnikov
47	DF	RUS	Kirill Suslov (from Prialit Reutov)
48	MF	RUS	Artyom Popov
56	DF	RUS	Anatoli Stukalov
58	FW	RUS	Mukhammad Sultonov
60	MF	GEO	Nika Dzalamidze (on loan from (Georgia (country)) Baia Zugdidi)
61	FW	RUS	Serder Serderov
92	DF	RUS	Pyotr Ten
—	FW	CIV	Seydou Doumbia (from (Switzerland) BSC Young Boys, to join CSKA in summer 2010)

Out: Note: Flags indicate national team as defined under FIFA eligibility rules; some limited exceptions apply. Players may hold more than one non-FIFA nationality.

No.	Pos.	Nation	Player
7	MF	BRA	Daniel Carvalho (on loan to (Qatar) Al-Arabi)
8	FW	RUS	Dmitri Ryzhov (on loan to Ural Sverdlovsk Oblast, previously on loan at Alania Vladikavkaz)
9	FW	BRA	Vágner Love (on loan to (Brazil) Flamengo, previously on loan at (Brazil) Palmeiras)
12	FW	NIG	Ouwo Moussa Maazou (on loan to (France) Monaco)
14	FW	BRA	Ricardo Jesus (on loan to (Greece) Larissa)
19	FW	POL	Dawid Janczyk (on loan to (Belgium) Germinal Beerschot, previously on loan at (Belgium) Lokeren)
33	GK	RUS	Yevgeny Pomazan (on loan to Ural Sverdlovsk Oblast)
34	MF	LVA	Vitālijs Maksimenko (end of loan from (Latvia) Daugava Rīga)
37	DF	RUS	Maksim Potapov (on loan to FC Astrakhan)
45	MF	RUS	Aleksandr Kudryavtsev (on loan to Shinnik Yaroslavl)
47	MF	RUS	Yevgeni Sherenkov (to Zelenograd)
48	MF	RUS	Igor Dragunov
50	DF	RUS	Anton Grigoryev (on loan to Kuban Krasnodar)
53	MF	RUS	Maksim Fyodorov (to Akademiya Togliatti)
56	FW	NGA	Ganiyu Oseni (to (Tunisia) Esperance Tunis)
57	MF	RUS	Nikita Andreyev
61	FW	RUS	Artak Grigoryan (to Zelenograd)
—	FW	RUS	Nikita Burmistrov (to Amkar Perm, previously on loan at Shinnik Yaroslavl)
—	GK	RUS	Veniamin Mandrykin (on loan to Spartak Nalchik, previously on loan at Rostov)
—	MF	BRA	Ramón (on loan to (Brazil) Flamengo, previously on loan at Krylia Sovetov Samara)
—	DF	RUS	Anton Vlasov (on loan to Volga Nizhny Novgorod, previously on loan at Anzhi Makhachkala)
—	DF	RUS	Ruslan Perepelyukov (on loan to Anzhi Makhachkala, previously on loan at Avangard Podolsk)
—	FW	RUS	Sergei Shumilin (to (Latvia) Ventspils, previously on loan at Sibir Novosibirsk)
—	DF	RUS	Sergei Perunov (to Nosta Novotroitsk, previously on loan at Gazovik Orenburg)
—	DF	RUS	Dmitri Protopopov (on loan to Dynamo Stavropol, previously on loan at Stavropolye-2009)
—	GK	RUS	Sergei Zhideyev (previously on loan at MVD Rossii Moscow)

== Dynamo Moscow ==
In: Note: Flags indicate national team as defined under FIFA eligibility rules; some limited exceptions apply. Players may hold more than one non-FIFA nationality.

No.	Pos.	Nation	Player
3	MF	RUS	Aleksei Rebko (from Moscow)
5	DF	MDA	Alexandru Epureanu (from Moscow)
10	FW	UKR	Andriy Voronin (from (England) Liverpool)
19	MF	RUS	Aleksandr Samedov (from Moscow)
21	MF	RUS	Igor Semshov (from Zenit Saint Petersburg)
41	GK	RUS	Yevgeni Puzin (from Kuban Krasnodar)
45	MF	RUS	Ivan Solovyov
46	DF	RUS	Aleksandr Bortnik (from CSKA Moscow youth)
47	MF	RUS	Oleg Valov
50	DF	MNE	Nemanja Mijušković (from (Serbia) OFK Beograd)
55	DF	RUS	Nikita Sergeyev
58	DF	RUS	Dmitri Otstavnov
66	MF	RUS	Yevgeni Frolov
73	MF	RUS	Yuri Petrakov (from Moscow)
75	GK	RUS	Ivan Shubkin
79	FW	RUS	Andrei Ornat (from Zenit St. Petersburg)
81	MF	RUS	Andrei Zharkov
87	DF	RUS	Aleksandr Kuzminov
88	MF	LTU	Edgaras Česnauskis (from Moscow)
89	FW	RUS	Aleksandr Bebikh (end on loan at Istra)
93	MF	RUS	Vladimir Shpyryov

Out: Note: Flags indicate national team as defined under FIFA eligibility rules; some limited exceptions apply. Players may hold more than one non-FIFA nationality.

No.	Pos.	Nation	Player
5	DF	MNE	Jovan Tanasijević (to Salyut Belgorod)
10	FW	RUS	Aleksandr Kerzhakov (to Zenit Saint Petersburg)
15	MF	RUS	Aleksandr Dimidko (on loan to SKA-Energiya Khabarovsk)
14	MF	RUS	Artur Yusupov (on loan to Khimki)
16	FW	BUL	Tsvetan Genkov (on loan to (Bulgaria) Lokomotiv Sofia)
21	GK	LTU	Žydrūnas Karčemarskas (to (Turkey) Gaziantepspor)
22	MF	URU	Luis Aguiar (on loan to (Portugal) Braga)
29	MF	RUS	Yuri Kirillov (on loan to Alania Vladikavkaz, previously at Khimki)
31	GK	RUS	Aleksei Karasevich (on loan to Nara-ShBFR Naro-Fominsk)
32	FW	RUS	Ruslan Pimenov (to (Belarus) Dinamo Minsk)
33	MF	RUS	Nail Zamaliyev (on loan to Salyut Belgorod)
41	MF	UKR	Denys Skepskyi (to Volgar-Gazprom Astrakhan)
44	DF	RUS	Nikita Chicherin (on loan to Khimki)
46	DF	RUS	Yuri Medvedev
50	MF	RUS	Vakhtang Morgoshiya
71	DF	RUS	Aleksandr Denisov (on loan to Dynamo Bryansk)
79	FW	RUS	Roman Panin (to Irtysh Omsk)
—	MF	RUS	Kirill Kurochkin (released, previously on loan at Metallurg Lipetsk)

== Krylia Sovetov Samara ==
In: Note: Flags indicate national team as defined under FIFA eligibility rules; some limited exceptions apply. Players may hold more than one non-FIFA nationality.

No.	Pos.	Nation	Player
2	DF	RUS	Vladimir Khozin (from Moscow)
5	DF	RUS	Alexey Kontsedalov (from Moscow)
6	MF	RUS	Oleg Samsonov (from Zenit Saint Petersburg)
8	MF	RUS	Daniil Gridnev (from Anzhi Makhachkala)
10	MF	SRB	Branimir Petrović (from Rostov)
11	FW	RUS	Igor Strelkov (from Moscow)
14	DF	TJK	Farkhod Vasiev (on loan from Saturn Moscow Oblast)
15	DF	RUS	Pavel Ivashentsev (from KAMAZ Naberezhnye Chelny)
16	GK	UKR	Mykola Tsygan (from Alania Vladikavkaz)
17	FW	RUS	Aleksandr Stavpets (from Moscow)
18	FW	RUS	Aleksandr Alkhazov (from KAMAZ Naberezhnye Chelny)
19	FW	RUS	Vasili Pavlov (from Academia Dimitrovgrad)
20	FW	RUS	Aleksandr Salugin (end of loan at Rostov)
22	FW	BLR	Vitali Rushnitskiy (end of loan at (Belarus) Belshina Bobruisk)
25	MF	RUS	Artur Rylov (from Moscow)
26	MF	RUS	Maksim Chistyakov
28	MF	RUS	Ruslan Gazzayev (from KAMAZ Naberezhnye Chelny)
30	GK	RUS	Nikita Alekseyev (from Moscow)
32	MF	RUS	Aleksandr Yeliseyev (from Moscow)
33	DF	BIH	Goran Drmić (from Moscow)
34	DF	RUS	Vladimir Yaroslavtsev
35	GK	RUS	Ruslan Yonchev
36	DF	RUS	Valeri Pochivalin
40	MF	RUS	Dmitri Kuznetsov
55	FW	RUS	Pavel Kiryanov (from Saturn-2 Moscow Oblast)
57	MF	RUS	Valeri Kruntyayev
69	MF	RUS	Anton Setezhev
87	DF	RUS	Valeri Zverev
89	DF	RUS	Igor Yegoshkin

Out: Note: Flags indicate national team as defined under FIFA eligibility rules; some limited exceptions apply. Players may hold more than one non-FIFA nationality.

No.	Pos.	Nation	Player
1	GK	RUS	David Yurchenko (on loan to Volgar-Gazprom Astrakhan)
2	MF	BLR	Timofei Kalachev (to Rostov)
4	DF	RUS	Roman Shishkin (end of loan from Spartak Moscow)
5	MF	RUS	Vladislav Kulik (to Kuban Krasnodar)
6	MF	BRA	Ramón (end of loan from CSKA Moscow)
13	DF	RUS	Roman Polovov (on loan to Energiya Volzhsky)
18	DF	RUS	Yevgeni Pesegov (on loan to Nizhny Novgorod)
20	DF	CZE	Jiří Jarošík (to (Spain) Real Zaragoza)
22	FW	RUS	Roman Adamov (end of loan from Rubin Kazan)
23	MF	RUS	Vladislav Ignatyev (to Lokomotiv Moscow)
25	DF	RUS	Vladimir Drukovskiy (on loan to Irtysh Omsk)
33	MF	MDA	Stanislav Ivanov (end of loan from Lokomotiv Moscow)
37	MF	RUS	Mikhail Kuzmin (on loan to Metallurg Lipetsk)
39	DF	RUS	Aleksei Popov (on loan to Dnepr Smolensk)
40	DF	RUS	Sergei Shustikov (to Rostov)
41	MF	RUS	Viktor Klimeyev (on loan to Nosta Novotroitsk)
47	MF	RUS	Roman Razdelkin (to Saturn-2 Moscow Oblast)
55	GK	RUS	Artyom Moskvin (to Avangard Kursk)
70	MF	RUS	Denis Shcherbak (to Irtysh Omsk)
89	FW	CZE	Jan Koller (to (France) AS Cannes)
98	GK	RUS	Aleksandr Budakov (to Kuban Krasnodar)

== Lokomotiv Moscow ==
In: Note: Flags indicate national team as defined under FIFA eligibility rules; some limited exceptions apply. Players may hold more than one non-FIFA nationality.

No.	Pos.	Nation	Player
7	MF	RUS	Dmitri Tarasov (from Moscow)
14	MF	RUS	Igor Smolnikov (end of loan at Chita)
15	MF	GHA	Haminu Draman (end of loan at Kuban Krasnodar)
18	MF	RUS	Vladislav Ignatyev (from Krylia Sovetov Samara)
19	FW	MLI	Dramane Traoré (end of loan at Kuban Krasnodar)
20	DF	SVN	Branko Ilič (from Moscow)
22	GK	RUS	Aleksandr Krivoruchko (from Lokomotiv-2 Moscow)
27	MF	RUS	Magomed Ozdoyev (from (Ukraine) Dynamo-2 Kyiv)
35	GK	RUS	Aleksandr Filtsov (from Togliatti)
52	GK	RUS	Yevgeni Bodanov
53	DF	RUS	Andrei Semyonov
59	MF	RUS	Aleksandr Vasyukov
61	FW	KGZ	Mirlan Murzaev (on loan from (Kyrgyzstan) Dordoi-Dynamo Naryn)
65	FW	RUS	Dmitri Kukharchuk
68	GK	RUS	Aleksandr Korshunov
71	DF	RUS	Aleksei Mamonov
72	FW	RUS	Soslan Dzhioyev
74	FW	RUS	Maksim Barsov
77	MF	RUS	Arkadi Kalaydzhyan
78	MF	RUS	Nikolai Kalinskiy
79	DF	RUS	Aleksandr Yarkovoy
82	DF	RUS	Soslan Gatagov
83	MF	RUS	Aleksei Malkov
84	MF	RUS	Daniil Lezgintsev
88	MF	UKR	Oleksandr Aliyev (from (Ukraine) Dynamo Kyiv)
90	FW	BRA	Maicon (from (Brazil) Fluminense)

Out: Note: Flags indicate national team as defined under FIFA eligibility rules; some limited exceptions apply. Players may hold more than one non-FIFA nationality.

No.	Pos.	Nation	Player
1	GK	RUS	Ivan Levenets (released)
10	MF	GEO	Davit Mujiri (to (Georgia (country)) Lokomotivi Tbilisi)
18	MF	NGA	Sani Kaita (end of loan from (France) Monaco)
19	FW	SEN	Baye Djiby Fall (on loan to (Norway) Molde)
20	DF	SVK	Ján Ďurica (on loan to (Germany) Hannover 96)
25	MF	ROU	Răzvan Cociş (to (Romania) Timişoara)
33	GK	BLR	Artem Gomelko (on loan to (Belarus) Naftan Novopolotsk)
34	GK	SUI	Eldin Jakupović (released)
38	MF	RUS	Denis Voynov (on loan to Lokomotiv-2 Moscow)
39	MF	RUS	Kirill Pavlov (to Lokomotiv-2 Moscow)
48	MF	RUS	Pavel Pechyonkin
52	MF	RUS	Nikita Samokhin (to Lokomotiv-2 Moscow)
57	MF	RUS	Pavel Deobald (to Lokomotiv-2 Moscow)
59	FW	RUS	Semyon Fomin (on loan to Lokomotiv-2 Moscow)
67	GK	RUS	Ilya Kiselyov
77	MF	MDA	Stanislav Ivanov (on loan to Rostov, previously on loan at Krylia Sovetov Samara)
78	MF	RUS	Aleksandr Pankovets (on loan to Lokomotiv-2 Moscow)
89	MF	RUS	Vitali Dyakov (on loan to Lokomotiv-2 Moscow)
—	DF	SVK	Marián Had (to (Slovakia) Slovan Bratislava, previously on loan at (Czech Republic) Sparta Prague)
—	DF	RUS	Vitali Marakhovskiy (to (Belarus) Dinamo Minsk, previously on loan at Torpedo Armavir)
—	MF	RUS	Roman Kontsedalov (to Spartak Nalchik, previously on loan)
—	MF	RUS	Aleksandr Cherevko (to Nizhny Novgorod, previously on loan)
—	DF	RUS	Nikita Denisov (previously on loan at Vityaz Podolsk)
—	MF	RUS	Kantemir Berkhamov (on loan to Nizhny Novgorod, previously on loan at Spartak Nalchik)

== FC Rostov ==
In: Note: Flags indicate national team as defined under FIFA eligibility rules; some limited exceptions apply. Players may hold more than one non-FIFA nationality.

No.	Pos.	Nation	Player
1	GK	BLR	Anton Amelchenko (from Moscow)
2	MF	BLR	Timofei Kalachev (from Krylia Sovetov Samara)
4	DF	NGA	Isaac Okoronkwo (from Moscow)
8	DF	RUS	Gia Grigalava (on loan from SKA Rostov-on-Don)
9	FW	RUS	Roman Adamov (on loan from Rubin Kazan)
14	DF	RUS	Anri Khagush (on loan from Rubin Kazan)
17	DF	RUS	Sergei Shustikov (from Krylia Sovetov Samara)
22	GK	SRB	Dejan Radić (from Spartak Nalchik)
24	DF	ROU	Sorin Ghionea (from (Romania) Steaua București)
27	GK	RUS	Maksim Kabanov (from SKA-Energiya Khabarovsk)
28	FW	RUS	Artyom Serdyuk (from Taganrog)
33	MF	RUS	Sergei Tumasyan (from SKA Rostov)
34	DF	UKR	Andriy Proshyn (from Alania Vladikavkaz)
36	DF	RUS	Igor Gubanov
39	MF	RUS	Mirzaga Guseynpur (from MITOS Novocherkassk)
40	MF	RUS	Igor Ponomaryov
41	MF	RUS	Khoren Bairamyan
42	FW	RUS	Anton Kabanov (from Kuban Krasnodar)
43	FW	RUS	Kirill Zaika
45	MF	RUS	Oleg Solonukha
46	FW	RUS	Konstantin Yavorskiy (from Lokomotiv-2 Moscow)
48	DF	RUS	Aleksandr Mitkin (from Smena-Zenit St. Petersburg)
49	MF	RUS	Nikita Vasilyev
50	MF	RUS	Irakli Khokhba
51	DF	RUS	Stanislav Engovatov (from Smena-Zenit St. Petersburg)
52	DF	RUS	Andrei Semenchuk (from Smena-Zenit St. Petersburg)
53	DF	RUS	Sergei Kharlamov
77	MF	MDA	Stanislav Ivanov (on loan from Lokomotiv Moscow)
81	MF	BIH	Dragan Blatnjak (from Moscow)

Out: Note: Flags indicate national team as defined under FIFA eligibility rules; some limited exceptions apply. Players may hold more than one non-FIFA nationality.

No.	Pos.	Nation	Player
1	GK	RUS	Roman Gerus (to (Kazakhstan) Lokomotiv Astana)
8	MF	RUS	Maksim Astafyev (to Sibir Novosibirsk)
10	MF	RUS	Mikhail Osinov (to Ural Sverdlovsk Oblast)
12	MF	RUS	Pyotr Gitselov (end of loan from Rubin Kazan)
18	MF	SRB	Branimir Petrović (to Krylia Sovetov Samara)
24	MF	RUS	Sergey Kuznetsov (to Khimki)
27	GK	RUS	Stanislav Khoteyev (to Shinnik Yaroslavl)
32	DF	RUS	Vladislav Dubovoy (to MITOS Novocherkassk)
37	FW	RUS	Sergey Chernyshev
40	MF	RUS	Maksim Kalmykov
42	MF	RUS	Yevgeni Matrakhov (to Vityaz Podolsk)
43	FW	RUS	Mikhail Ignatov (to Vityaz Podolsk)
44	GK	RUS	Artyom Nazarov (to Vityaz Podolsk)
45	MF	RUS	Ilya Bannov (to Vityaz Podolsk)
46	DF	RUS	Aleksandr Vasilyev (to Vityaz Podolsk)
48	MF	RUS	Maksim Levchenko (to MITOS Novocherkassk)
49	DF	RUS	Aleksei Sizintsev
50	FW	RUS	Vitali Kirichenko
52	MF	RUS	Artyom Syomka
54	DF	RUS	Ivan Lapin (end of loan from Zenit Saint Petersburg)
57	DF	RUS	Astemir Sheriyev (on loan to Nizhny Novgorod)
58	DF	RUS	Aleksei Klubkov
59	DF	RUS	Taymuraz Kozayev
60	FW	RUS	Dmitri Kortava (to Sportakademklub Moscow)
62	DF	RUS	Kirill Chekmaryov
63	MF	RUS	Andrei Lyakh (to (Lithuania) FK Vėtra)
83	DF	RUS	Mikhail Rozhkov (to (Kazakhstan) Lokomotiv Astana)
85	MF	SRB	Nenad Šljivić (to (Serbia) Jagodina)
88	FW	RUS	Aleksandr Salugin (end of loan from Krylia Sovetov Samara)
—	FW	RUS	Mikhail Kozlov (to Dynamo Saint Petersburg, previously on loan at Vityaz Podolsk)
—	FW	RUS	Yakov Ehrlich (to FC Rotor Volgograd, previously on loan)

== Rubin Kazan ==
In: Note: Flags indicate national team as defined under FIFA eligibility rules; some limited exceptions apply. Players may hold more than one non-FIFA nationality.

No.	Pos.	Nation	Player
10	FW	TUR	Fatih Tekke (from Zenit Saint Petersburg)
19	DF	RUS	Vitali Kaleshin (from Moscow, previously on loan)
20	FW	UZB	Bahodir Nasimov (from (Uzbekistan) Samarqand-Dinamo)
31	DF	RUS	Mikhail Badyautdinov (from Rubin-2 Kazan)
33	DF	ESP	Jordi (from (Spain) Celta Vigo)
42	DF	RUS	Marat Doyati
55	MF	RUS	Artyom Kuklev (from Rubin-2 Kazan)
56	MF	RUS	Ruslan Makhmutov (from Togliatti)
57	FW	BLR	Anton Saroka (from (Belarus) Dinamo Minsk)
66	MF	ISR	Bibras Natcho (from (Israel) Hapoel Tel Aviv)
79	GK	RUS	Yuri Nesterenko (from Krasnodar-2000)
82	DF	RUS	Mikhail Mischenko (end of loan to Alania Vladikavkaz)
86	DF	RUS	Vitali Ustinov (from Moscow)
98	GK	MDA	Ilie Cebanu (from (Poland) Wisła Kraków)

Out: Note: Flags indicate national team as defined under FIFA eligibility rules; some limited exceptions apply. Players may hold more than one non-FIFA nationality.

No.	Pos.	Nation	Player
1	GK	RUS	Sergei Kozko
2	DF	CRO	Stjepan Tomas (to (Turkey) Gaziantepspor)
10	FW	ARG	Alejandro Domínguez (to (Spain) Valencia)
24	DF	RUS	Aleksei Popov (to Amkar Perm)
27	DF	GEO	Dato Kvirkvelia (on loan to Anzhi Makhachala)
29	GK	GEO	Nukri Revishvili (to Anzhi Makhachkala)
44	DF	RUS	Igor Klimov (on loan to Khimki)
56	FW	RUS	Ruslan Nagayev (on loan to Rubin-2 Kazan)
64	GK	RUS	Dmitry Kortnev (to Rubin-2 Kazan)
—	MF	POR	Fábio Felício (to (Portugal) Vitória, previously on loan at (Greece) Asteras Tripoli)
—	DF	RUS	Anri Khagush (on loan to Rostov, previously on loan at Kuban Krasnodar)
—	DF	BRA	Gabriel Atz (to (Bulgaria) Chernomorets Burgas, previously on loan at (Spain) Gimnàstic de Tarragona)
—	MF	RUS	Pyotr Gitselov (to (Sweden) Mjällby, previously on loan at Rostov)
—	FW	RUS	Roman Adamov (on loan to Rostov, previously on loan at Krylia Sovetov Samara)
—	DF	RUS	Aleksandr Kulikov (on loan to Krasnodar, previously on loan at Salyut-Energia Belgorod)
—	FW	RUS	Aleksandr Yarkin (to Krasnodar, previously on loan at Alania Vladikavkaz)
—	FW	RUS	Vladimir Dyadyun (on loan to Spartak Nalchik, previously on loan at Tom Tomsk)
—	MF	RUS	Dmitri Shestakov (to Fakel Voronezh, previously on loan at Istra)

== Saturn Moscow Oblast ==
In: Note: Flags indicate national team as defined under FIFA eligibility rules; some limited exceptions apply. Players may hold more than one non-FIFA nationality.

No.	Pos.	Nation	Player
11	MF	RUS	Denis Boyarintsev (from Spartak Moscow)
13	MF	RUS	Dmitri Kudryashov (from Luch-Energiya Vladivostok)
20	FW	SVK	Martin Jakubko (from Moscow)
42	DF	RUS	Aleksandr Vlaskin (from Saturn-2 Moscow Oblast)
43	MF	RUS	Andrei Savchenko
44	MF	RUS	Nikita Lapin
46	MF	RUS	Viktor Kuzmichyov (from Togliatti)
51	FW	RUS	Shamil Kurbanov
52	MF	RUS	Aleksandr Semyachkin
79	FW	RUS	Marat Gubzhev (from Spartak Nalchik)
80	GK	RUS	Aleksei Skornyakov
91	FW	RUS	Aleksandr Manyukov
92	MF	RUS	Artyom Pershin (end of loan from Baltika Kaliningrad)
94	GK	RUS	Aleksei Shirokov (end of loan from Znamya Truda Orekhovo-Zuyevo)
96	GK	RUS	Aleksandr Romanov (end of loan from Saturn-2 Moscow Oblast)

Out: Note: Flags indicate national team as defined under FIFA eligibility rules; some limited exceptions apply. Players may hold more than one non-FIFA nationality.

No.	Pos.	Nation	Player
17	FW	BLR	Vladimir Yurchenko (on loan to (Belarus) Dnepr Mogilev)
30	GK	RUS	Aleksandr Makarov (on loan to Dynamo Saint Petersburg)
35	MF	RUS	Ivan Temnikov (on loan to Ural Sverdlovsk Oblast)
42	DF	RUS	Fyodor Pronkov (to Saturn-2 Moscow Oblast)
43	DF	RUS	Vitali Zaytsev
45	DF	RUS	Mikhail Kuzyayev (to Saturn-2 Moscow Oblast)
46	MF	RUS	Mikhail Spirin (to Saturn-2 Moscow Oblast)
54	DF	RUS	Sergei Pervadchuk (on loan to Nara-ShBFR Naro-Fominsk)
59	MF	RUS	Aleksandr Medvedev
61	DF	TJK	Farkhod Vasiev (to Krylia Sovetov Samara)
68	DF	RUS	Andrei Kurasov (to Znamya Truda Orekhovo-Zuyevo)
91	FW	RUS	Aleksandr Manyukov (on loan to Saturn-2 Moscow Oblast)
93	DF	RUS	Aleksandr Grishchenko (to Saturn-2 Moscow Oblast)
94	GK	RUS	Aleksei Shirokov (on loan to Saturn-2 Moscow Oblast)
96	GK	RUS	Aleksandr Romanov (on loan to Saturn-2 Moscow Oblast)
—	GK	RUS	Aleksei Botvinyev (on loan to Krasnodar, previously on loan at Kuban Krasnodar)
—	DF	RUS	Yegor Kvach (to Saturn-2 Moscow Oblast, previously on loan at Torpedo-ZIL Moscow)
—	MF	RUS	Anatoli Gerk (to Ural Sverdlovsk Oblast, previously on loan)
—	MF	RUS	Anton Kozlov (on loan to Avangard Kursk, previously on loan at Nizhny Novgorod)

== Sibir Novosibirsk ==
In: Note: Flags indicate national team as defined under FIFA eligibility rules; some limited exceptions apply. Players may hold more than one non-FIFA nationality.

No.	Pos.	Nation	Player
1	GK	RUS	Aleksei Solosin (from Tom Tomsk)
9	FW	RUS	Aleksandr Antipenko (from Khimki)
11	MF	CZE	Tomáš Čížek (from (Czech Republic) Baumit Jablonec)
15	MF	RUS	Ivan Nagibin (from Chita)
21	DF	SRB	Nikola Valentić (from Alania Vladikavkaz)
22	DF	BLR	Egor Filipenko (on loan from Spartak Moscow)
24	DF	LTU	Arūnas Klimavičius (from Ural Sverdlovsk Oblast)
29	MF	RUS	Andrei Shreiner (from Krasnodar)
30	GK	POL	Wojciech Kowalewski (from (Greece) Iraklis Thessaloniki)
31	FW	RUS	Maksim Gorodtsov (from Torpedo-ZIL Moscow)
33	MF	RUS	Pavel Logvinov (from Saturn-2 Moscow Oblast)
39	FW	RUS	Vladimir Glukhov (from Sokol Saratov)
54	MF	RUS	Aleksei Vasilyev (from Nosta Novotroitsk, previously on loan)
65	FW	RUS	Artyom Dudolev
88	MF	RUS	Maksim Astafyev (from Rostov)
90	MF	RUS	Maksim Zhitnev (from KUZBASS Kemerovo)
95	MF	RUS	Roman Belyayev (end of loan at Chita)
99	FW	RUS	Igor Shevchenko (from Terek Grozny)
—	MF	RUS	Yevgeni Polyakov (end of loan at KUZBASS Kemerovo)

Note: footballers transferred from Sibir-LFC (amateur level farm team) are not listed.

Out: Note: Flags indicate national team as defined under FIFA eligibility rules; some limited exceptions apply. Players may hold more than one non-FIFA nationality.

No.	Pos.	Nation	Player
1	GK	SRB	Nenad Erić (to (Kazakhstan) Kairat Almaty)
2	DF	RUS	Nikolai Samoylov (to Ural Sverdlovsk Oblast)
5	MF	RUS	Kirill Akilov (to Khimki)
10	FW	MKD	Goran Stankovski (to (Turkey) Diyarbakırspor)
11	MF	KOR	Denis Laktionov
14	DF	RUS	Semyon Semenenko
22	GK	RUS	Sergei Chepchugov (to CSKA Moscow)
29	MF	RUS	Artyom Kabanov
65	GK	RUS	Aleksandr Dovbnya (to Nizhny Novgorod)
79	FW	RUS	Sergei Shumilin (end of loan from CSKA Moscow)
—	GK	RUS	Timur Bagautdinov (on loan to Tyumen, previously at SOYUZ-Gazprom Izhevsk)
—	MF	RUS	Aleksei Zhitnikov (to Rotor Volgograd, previously on loan at Vityaz Podolsk)
—	DF	RUS	Igor Shestakov (to Rotor Volgograd, previously on loan at Chernomorets Novorossiysk)

== Spartak Moscow ==
In: Note: Flags indicate national team as defined under FIFA eligibility rules; some limited exceptions apply. Players may hold more than one non-FIFA nationality.

No.	Pos.	Nation	Player
4	DF	RUS	Roman Shishkin (end on loan at Krylia Sovetov Samara)
5	MF	RUS	Aleksandr Sheshukov (free agent from Moscow)
8	MF	MNE	Nikola Drinčić (free agent from Amkar Perm)
9	FW	BRA	Ari (from (Netherlands) AZ)
17	DF	CZE	Marek Suchý (on loan from (Czech Republic) Slavia Prague)
28	GK	RUS	Nikolai Zabolotny (from Zenit St. Petersburg)
29	MF	RUS	Pavel Golyshev (free agent from Moscow)
31	FW	RUS	Nikolai Ivannikov (from Academia Dimitrovgrad)
40	DF	RUS	Konstantin Ryabov (from Academia Dimitrovgrad)
42	GK	RUS	Sergey Chernyshuk
44	MF	RUS	Maksim Terentyev
46	MF	RUS	Konstantin Sovetkin (end on loan at Anzhi Makhachkala)
47	DF	RUS	Anton Ukolov
51	MF	RUS	Pavel Solomatin
57	DF	RUS	Nikolai Fadeyev
58	DF	RUS	Aleksandr Putsko
59	MF	RUS	Aleksandr Ilyin

Out: Note: Flags indicate national team as defined under FIFA eligibility rules; some limited exceptions apply. Players may hold more than one non-FIFA nationality.

No.	Pos.	Nation	Player
4	DF	GER	Malik Fathi (on loan to (Germany) Mainz 05)
5	MF	BRA	Rafael Carioca (on loan to (Brazil) Vasco da Gama)
7	MF	RUS	Denis Boyarintsev (free agent to Saturn Moscow Oblast)
8	MF	RUS	Aleksandr Pavlenko (on loan to FC Rostov)
9	FW	RUS	Artyom Dzyuba (on loan to Tom Tomsk)
17	MF	MDA	Serghei Covalciuc (free agent to Tom Tomsk)
18	FW	RUS	Aleksandr Prudnikov (on loan to Tom Tomsk, previously on loan at (Czech Republic) Sparta Prague)
19	FW	RUS	Artur Maloyan (on loan to Ural Sverdlovsk Oblast, previously on loan at Anzhi Makhachkala)
20	DF	LTU	Ignas Dedura (free agent to Salyut Belgorod)
24	MF	RUS	Vladislav Ryzhkov (on loan to Shinnik Yaroslavl)
29	FW	RUS	Amir Bazhev (free agent to Salyut Belgorod, previously of loan)
39	MF	RUS	Igor Gorbatenko (on loan to Ural Sverdlovsk Oblast)
50	FW	RUS	Artem Fomin (to (Kazakhstan) Kairat Almaty)
54	MF	RUS	Dmitri Tumenko (on loan to Dynamo Bryansk)
55	MF	GHA	Quincy Owusu-Abeyie (to (Qatar) Al-Sadd Sports Club, previously on loan at (England) Portsmouth)
56	DF	RUS	Marat Khiyasov (on loan to Nosta Novotroitsk)
57	FW	RUS	Artyom Nozdrunov (to Tom Tomsk)
58	DF	BLR	Egor Filipenko (on loan to Sibir Novosibirsk)
59	DF	RUS	Andrei Ivanov (on loan to Tom Tomsk)
60	GK	RUS	Ivan Komissarov (on loan to Tom Tomsk)
81	FW	RUS	Eldar Nizamutdinov (end of loan from Khimki, now on loan to Alania Vladikavkaz)
—	GK	RUS	Dmitri Khomich (to Alania Vladikavkaz, previously on loan at Spartak Nalchik)

== Spartak Nalchik ==
In: Note: Flags indicate national team as defined under FIFA eligibility rules; some limited exceptions apply. Players may hold more than one non-FIFA nationality.

No.	Pos.	Nation	Player
2	DF	RUS	Vladislav Khatazhyonkov (from Vityaz Podolsk)
3	DF	RUS	Viktor Vasin (end of loan at Nizhny Novgorod)
6	DF	RUS	Ivan Lapin (on loan from FC Zenit)
7	MF	GEO	Gogita Gogua (end of loan at Terek Grozny)
10	MF	RUS	Nikita Malyarov (from Nara-ShBFR Naro-Fominsk)
11	MF	RUS	Roman Kontsedalov (from Lokomotiv Moscow, previously on loan)
13	MF	RUS	Aleksandr Shchanitsyn (from Ural Sverdlovsk Oblast)
14	FW	COD	Patrick Etshini (on loan from (Democratic Republic of the Congo) MK Etanchéité ?)
15	FW	SVN	Dejan Rusič (on loan from (Romania) Timişoara)
16	GK	RUS	Veniamin Mandrykin (on loan from CSKA Moscow)
21	MF	RUS	Oleg Shalayev (from Krasnodar-2000)
22	MF	RUS	Vladimir Dyadyun (on loan from Rubin Kazan)
23	DF	SRB	Stefan Deák (from (Serbia) Veternik)
27	FW	RUS	Aslan Barokov
30	GK	FIN	Otto Fredrikson (from (Norway) Lillestrøm)
35	FW	RUS	Mikhail Bilaonov (from Amkar Perm)
37	DF	RUS	Azamat Merov
48	MF	RUS	Aleksandr Trubitsin
53	MF	RUS	Timur Teberdiyev
54	DF	RUS	Akhmat Chochuyev
56	DF	RUS	Pavel Mochalin (on loan from FC Zenit)
57	DF	RUS	Ruslan Abazov
58	MF	RUS	Ruslan Bolov
59	FW	RUS	Dzhashar Khubiyev

Out: Note: Flags indicate national team as defined under FIFA eligibility rules; some limited exceptions apply. Players may hold more than one non-FIFA nationality.

No.	Pos.	Nation	Player
2	DF	BRA	Antonio Ferreira (to Terek Grozny)
3	DF	RUS	Dmitri Yatchenko (to Terek Grozny)
10	FW	RUS	Nazir Kazharov (to Volgar-Gazprom Astrakhan)
11	FW	BLR	Artem Kontsevoy (on loan to (Belarus) BATE Borisov)
13	GK	RUS	Dmitri Khomich (end of loan from Spartak Moscow)
15	MF	RUS	Aslan Mashukov (to Alania Vladikavkaz)
22	GK	SRB	Dejan Radić (to Rostov)
26	FW	RUS	Sergei Ovchinnikov (to Gornyak Uchaly)
27	GK	RUS	Boris Shogenov (to Druzhba Maykop)
28	MF	RUS	Oleg Samsonov (end of loan from Zenit Saint Petersburg)
29	MF	UKR	Serhiy Pylypchuk (end of loan from Khimki)
32	DF	RUS	Islam Goshokov
38	MF	RUS	Konstantin Mikhailov
42	DF	RUS	Salim Naurzokov
44	FW	RUS	Arsen Goshokov (to Irtysh Omsk)
48	MF	RUS	Vadim Zakharov (to Dynamo Stavropol)
53	DF	RUS	Gerikhan Shogenov
55	FW	RUS	Shamil Asildarov (to Terek Grozny)
57	FW	RUS	Atsamaz Burayev (to Avtodor Vladikavkaz)
59	DF	RUS	Mikail Gadzhiyev
79	FW	RUS	Marat Gubzhev (to Saturn Moscow Oblast)
84	FW	RUS	Rustem Kalimullin (end of loan from KAMAZ Naberezhnye Chelny)
88	MF	RUS	Kantemir Berkhamov (end of loan from Lokomotiv Moscow)
90	MF	BIH	Ricardo Santos Lago (end of loan from Krasnodar)
—	GK	KAZ	David Loria (to (Kazakhstan) Irtysh Pavlodar, previously on loan at (Kazakhstan) Lokomotiv Astana)
—	MF	RUS	Aslan Dyshekov (to Irtysh Omsk, previously on loan at Stavropol)
—	FW	RUS	Marat Dzakhmishev (previously on loan at Chernomorets Novorossiysk)
—	MF	RUS	Kirill Kochubei (to Rotor Volgograd, previously on loan at Chernomorets Novorossiysk)

== Terek Grozny ==
In: Note: Flags indicate national team as defined under FIFA eligibility rules; some limited exceptions apply. Players may hold more than one non-FIFA nationality.

No.	Pos.	Nation	Player
3	DF	RUS	Dmitri Yatchenko (from Spartak Nalchik)
5	DF	BRA	Antonio Ferreira (from Spartak Nalchik)
6	DF	BRA	Santana (on loan from (Brazil) Náutico)
8	MF	BRA	Maurício (from (Brazil) Fluminense)
9	MF	CMR	Guy Stephane Essame (end of loan at Nizhny Novgorod)
11	FW	RUS	Shamil Asildarov (from Spartak Nalchik)
24	MF	RUS	Dmitri A. Smirnov (end of loan at Tom Tomsk)
27	GK	RUS	Ramzan Asayev
35	DF	RUS	Yusup Tepishev
38	FW	RUS	Salambek Elgadzhiyev
55	MF	RUS	Ramzan Sadulayev
71	FW	BOL	Juan Carlos Arce (from (Bolivia) Oriente Petrolero)
76	MF	RUS	Alikhan Soltayev
78	DF	RUS	Alikhan Ediyev
80	MF	RUS	Islam Dzhabrailov
88	MF	RUS	Bekkhan Usmanov
93	FW	RUS	Apti Akhyadov
98	DF	RUS	Batyr Umarov (from Lider Khosi-Yurt (D4))
99	FW	RUS	Khalid Kadyrov

Out: Note: Flags indicate national team as defined under FIFA eligibility rules; some limited exceptions apply. Players may hold more than one non-FIFA nationality.

No.	Pos.	Nation	Player
1	GK	ALB	Ilion Lika (to (Albania) FK Vllaznia)
2	DF	SVK	Radoslav Zabavník (to (Germany) Mainz 05)
5	DF	BRA	Cléber (to (Poland) Wisła Kraków)
6	MF	ROU	Andrei Mărgăritescu (to (Romania) Dinamo București)
8	FW	ROU	Daniel Pancu (to (Bulgaria) CSKA Sofia)
11	MF	ROU	Florentin Petre (to (Bulgaria) CSKA Sofia)
14	DF	BUL	Valentin Iliev (to (Romania) Universitatea Craiova)
18	DF	RUS	Timur Dzhabrailov (retired)
19	GK	MDA	Stepan Sikach (on loan to Volgar-Gazprom Astrakhan)
26	DF	RUS	Sergei Bendz (to Nizhny Novgorod)
26	MF	GEO	Gogita Gogua (end of loan from Spartak Nalchik)
35	GK	RUS	Askerkhan Dzhamuyev
42	FW	RUS	Islam Kadyrov
43	DF	RUS	Ismail Salmurzayev
54	MF	RUS	Magomed Muzayev
55	FW	RUS	Movsur Adamov
57	MF	RUS	German Kutarba
58	MF	BRA	Fabrício (to (Israel) Maccabi Netanya)
59	MF	RUS	Artyom Voronkin (to Luch-Energiya Vladivostok)
—	FW	RUS	Igor Shevchenko (to Sibir Novosibirsk, previously on loan at Kuban Krasnodar)
—	MF	CMR	Jean Bouli (to Luch-Energiya Vladivostok, previously on loan at Nizhny Novgorod)
—	FW	RUS	Viktor Zemchenkov (to Baltika Kaliningrad, previously on loan at Nizhny Novgorod)

== Tom Tomsk ==
In: Note: Flags indicate national team as defined under FIFA eligibility rules; some limited exceptions apply. Players may hold more than one non-FIFA nationality.

No.	Pos.	Nation	Player
9	MF	MDA	Serghei Covalciuc (from Spartak Moscow)
14	FW	BLR	Sergei Kornilenko (on loan from Zenit Saint Petersburg)
15	DF	RUS	Sergei Golyatkin (previously on loan at Chernomorets Novorossiysk)
19	FW	RUS	Aleksandr Prudnikov (on loan from Spartak Moscow)
20	GK	RUS	Artyom Dzyuba (on loan from Spartak Moscow)
22	DF	KOR	Park Hae-Sung (from (South Korea) Incheon United)
23	DF	RUS	Georgi Dzhioyev (from Kuban Krasnodar)
30	GK	RUS	Ivan Komissarov (on loan from Spartak Moscow)
44	GK	RUS	Vladimir Ageyev
50	MF	RUS	Yevgeni Koksharov
55	DF	KOR	Kim Nam-Il (from (Japan) Vissel Kobe)
57	FW	RUS	Artyom Nozdrunov (from Spartak Moscow)
62	DF	RUS	Artur Zaks (from Prialit Reutov)
65	MF	RUS	Oleg Sokulov
69	DF	RUS	Maksim Suvorov
70	FW	RUS	Artyom Korotya
73	DF	RUS	Ilya Gerdt
87	FW	USA	Yevgeni Starikov (on loan from Zenit Saint Petersburg)
88	MF	RUS	Bobimirza Makhmudov
92	DF	RUS	Artyom Kochergin
99	MF	RUS	Aleksei Sazonov

Out: Note: Flags indicate national team as defined under FIFA eligibility rules; some limited exceptions apply. Players may hold more than one non-FIFA nationality.

No.	Pos.	Nation	Player
1	GK	RUS	Ivan Perfilyev (to Khimik Dzerzhinsk)
14	FW	RUS	Artyom Dzyuba (end of loan from Spartak Moscow)
21	DF	MDA	Valeriu Catinsus (to Shinnik Yaroslavl)
22	FW	RUS	Vladimir Dyadyun (end of loan from Rubin Kazan)
23	MF	SVN	Aleksandar Radosavljević (to (Greece) Larissa)
24	MF	RUS	Dmitri A. Smirnov (end of loan from Terek Grozny)
30	FW	RUS	Aleksandr Zobnin (to Avangard Kursk)
34	DF	RUS	Dmitri Sergeyev (on loan to Dynamo Barnaul)
35	DF	RUS	Ilya Vakhrushev (to Radian-Baikal Irkutsk)
53	MF	RUS	Konstantin Sashilin
54	MF	RUS	Sergei Aksyonov
80	FW	RUS	Sergei Voronov (on loan to KUZBASS Kemerovo)
89	DF	RUS	Dmitri Matviyenko (to Radian-Baikal Irkutsk)
—	GK	RUS	Aleksei Solosin (to Sibir Novosibirsk, previously on loan at Ural Sverdlovsk Oblast)
—	GK	RUS	Yevgeni Gorodov (on loan to Shinnik Yaroslavl, previously on loan at Chita)
—	FW	RUS	Anton Arkhipov (to Shinnik Yaroslavl, previously on loan at Chernomorets Novorossiysk)
—	FW	RUS	Yevgeni Ponomaryov (on loan to Radian-Baikal Irkutsk, previously on loan at Irtysh Omsk)
—	DF	RUS	Valeri Voloshchuk (previously on loan at Sibiryak Bratsk)
—	MF	RUS	Mikhail Vanyov (previously on loan at Chita)

== Zenit Saint Petersburg ==
In: Note: Flags indicate national team as defined under FIFA eligibility rules; some limited exceptions apply. Players may hold more than one non-FIFA nationality.

No.	Pos.	Nation	Player
8	FW	SRB	Danko Lazović (from (Netherlands) PSV Eindhoven)
11	FW	RUS	Aleksandr Kerzhakov (from Dynamo Moscow)
28	DF	DEN	Michael Lumb (from (Denmark) AGF)
30	GK	BLR	Yuri Zhevnov (from Moscow)
37	DF	RUS	Aleksandr Khokhlov (end of loan at Kuban Krasnodar)
48	DF	RUS	Aslan Dudiyev (on loan from Togliatti)
63	DF	RUS	Denis Terentyev (from DYuSSh Smena-Zenit)
64	DF	RUS	Ilya Lebedev (from DYuSSh Smena-Zenit)
66	DF	RUS	Yuri Ponomarenko (from DYuSSh Smena-Zenit)
71	GK	RUS	Yegor Baburin (from DYuSSh Smena-Zenit)
74	DF	RUS	Vladimir Malyshev (from DYuSSh Smena-Zenit)
77	MF	RUS	Aleksandr Petrov (from SDYuShOR Zenit)
78	FW	RUS	Vladislav Yefimov (from DYuSSh Smena-Zenit)
81	GK	RUS	Aleksandr Glinskikh (from Smena-Zenit St. Petersburg)
83	DF	RUS	Andrei Vasilyev (from SDYuShOR Zenit)
87	MF	RUS	Aleksei Kayukov (from DYuSSh Smena-Zenit)
88	DF	RUS	Dmitri Telegin (from DYuSSh Smena-Zenit)
90	GK	RUS	Aleksei Dugnist (from DYuSSh Smena-Zenit)
93	FW	RUS	Aleksei Panfilov (from DYuSSh Smena-Zenit)
95	FW	RUS	Pavel Shuvalov (from DYuSSh Smena-Zenit)
97	FW	RUS	Vladislav Sirotov (from Smena-Zenit St. Petersburg)

Out: Note: Flags indicate national team as defined under FIFA eligibility rules; some limited exceptions apply. Players may hold more than one non-FIFA nationality.

No.	Pos.	Nation	Player
1	GK	SVK	Kamil Čontofalský (to (Cyprus) AEL Limassol)
5	DF	KOR	Kim Dong-Jin (to (South Korea) Ulsan Hyundai Horang-i)
9	FW	TUR	Fatih Tekke (to Rubin Kazan)
19	FW	BLR	Sergei Kornilenko (on loan to Tom Tomsk)
21	MF	RUS	Igor Semshov (to Dynamo Moscow)
30	DF	RUS	Pavel Komolov (to (Lithuania) Žalgiris Vilnius)
33	FW	RUS	Pavel Ignatovich (not registered to play)
37	DF	RUS	Dmitri Grebenev (released)
51	GK	RUS	Vladimir Mukhin (to Dynamo Barnaul)
53	DF	RUS	Pavel Mochalin (on loan to Spartak Nalchik)
55	DF	RUS	Yan Bobrovsky (to (Lithuania) Žalgiris Vilnius)
59	DF	RUS	Sergey Vasetsky (to Krasnodar-2000)
77	MF	RUS	Aleksandr Petrov (to Khimki)
79	FW	RUS	Andrei Ornat (to Dynamo Moscow)
87	FW	USA	Yevgeni Starikov (on loan to Tom Tomsk)
88	FW	SRB	Mateja Kežman (end of loan from (France) Paris Saint-Germain)
90	GK	RUS	Nikolai Zabolotny (to Spartak Moscow)
—	FW	RUS	Oleg Kozhanov (to Volga Nizhny Novgorod, previously on loan at Khimki)
—	DF	RUS	Ivan Lapin (on loan to Spartak Nalchik, previously on loan at Rostov)
—	GK	RUS	Mikhail Kerzhakov (to Alania Vladikavkaz, previously on loan at Volgar-Gazprom-2 Astrakhan)
—	DF	FIN	Boris Rotenberg (on loan to Alania Vladikavkaz, previously on loan at Khimki)
—	MF	RUS	Oleg Samsonov (to Krylia Sovetov Samara, previously on loan at Spartak Nalchik)
—	MF	RUS	Ilya Maksimov (released, previously on loan at Khimki)
—	FW	RUS	Semyon Melnikov (to Dynamo St. Petersburg, previously on loan at Vityaz Podolsk)
—	MF	RUS	Yuri Lebedev (to Baltika Kaliningrad, previously on loan)
—	MF	RUS	Pavel Zubov (to Irtysh Omsk, previously on loan at Smena-Zenit St. Petersburg)
—	MF	RUS	Nikita Kolesnikov (to Dynamo St. Petersburg, previously on loan at Smena-Zenit St. Petersburg)
