= 2010 FC Rostov season =

Rostov
2010 season
- Chairman: Oleg Lopatin
- Stadium: Olimp – 2, Rostov
- Russian Premier League: 9th
- Russian Cup: Progressed to 2011–12 season
- Top goalscorer: League: Roman Adamov (8); All: Roman Adamov (9)
Home colours	Away colours

The 2010 FC Rostov season was the second successive season that the club played in the Russian Premier League, the highest tier of football in Russia, during which they finished 9th.

== Squad ==
As of match played 28 November 2010

No.	Name	Nationality	Position	Date of birth (age)	Signed from	Signed in	Contract ends	Apps.	Goals
Goalkeepers
1	Anton Amelchenko	(Belarus)	GK	27 March 1985 (aged 25)	Moscow	2010		23	0
16	Vladimir Zabuga	(Russia)	GK	8 July 1990 (aged 20)	Abinsk	2009		0	0
22	Dejan Radić	(Serbia)	GK	8 July 1980 (aged 30)	Spartak Nalchik	2010		9	0
31	Aleksandr Solovyov	(Russia)	GK	16 February 1991 (aged 19)	Youth Team	2009		0	0
Defenders
3	Dušan Anđelković	(Serbia)	DF	15 June 1982 (aged 28)	Kocaelispor	2009	2012	52	1
4	Isaac Okoronkwo	(Nigeria)	DF	1 May 1978 (aged 32)	Moscow	2010		22	0
5	Aleksandr Cherkes	(Russia)	DF	2 September 1976 (aged 34)	Shinnik Yaroslavl	2008	2010		
8	Gia Grigalava	(Russia)	DF	5 August 1989 (aged 21)	loan from SKA Rostov-on-Don	2010	2010	14	0
14	Anri Khagush	(Russia)	DF	23 September 1986 (aged 24)	loan from Rubin Kazan	2010		21	2
17	Sergey Shustikov	(Russia)	DF	5 March 1989 (aged 21)	Krylia Sovetov	2010		0	0
24	Sorin Ghionea	(Romania)	DF	11 May 1979 (aged 31)	Steaua București	2010		20	0
26	Ivan Živanović	(Serbia)	DF	10 December 1981 (aged 28)	Sampdoria	2008			
34	Andriy Proshyn	(Ukraine)	DF	19 February 1985 (aged 25)	Alania Vladikavkaz	2010		4	0
35	Vasili Mironik	(Russia)	DF	12 September 1991 (aged 19)	Youth Team	2009		0	0
36	Igor Gubanov	(Russia)	DF	4 February 1992 (aged 18)	Youth Team	2010		0	0
37	Oleg Leshchikov	(Russia)	DF	29 September 1989 (aged 21)	Nika Krasny Sulin	2009		0	0
38	Anri Khagba	(Russia)	DF	7 January 1992 (aged 18)	Youth Team	2010		1	0
48	Aleksandr Mitkin	(Russia)	DF	25 July 1991 (aged 19)	Smena-Zenit St. Petersburg	2010		0	0
53	Sergei Kharlamov	(Russia)	DF	24 January 1991 (aged 19)	Moscow Youth Team	2010		0	0
Midfielders
2	Timofei Kalachev	(Belarus)	MF	1 May 1981 (aged 29)	Krylia Sovetov	2010			
7	Alyaksandr Kulchy	(Belarus)	MF	1 November 1973 (aged 37)	Tom Tomsk	2008			
20	Artur Valikayev	(Russia)	MF	8 January 1988 (aged 22)	Nizhny Novgorod	2009		14	1
23	Chavdar Yankov	(Bulgaria)	MF	29 March 1984 (aged 26)	loan from Metalurh Donetsk	2010		12	2
25	Aleksandr Pavlenko	(Russia)	MF	20 January 1985 (aged 25)	loan from Spartak Moscow	2009		35	8
33	Sergei Tumasyan	(Russia)	MF	31 January 1990 (aged 20)	SKA Rostov-on-Don	2010		3	0
40	Igor Ponomaryov	(Russia)	MF	26 May 1992 (aged 18)	Youth Team	2010		0	0
41	Khoren Bayramyan	(Russia)	MF	26 May 1992 (aged 18)	Youth Team	2010		0	0
45	Oleg Solonukha	(Russia)	MF	30 January 1992 (aged 18)	Youth Team	2010		0	0
49	Nikita Vasilyev	(Russia)	MF	22 March 1992 (aged 18)	Spartak Moscow	2010		0	0
50	Irakli Khokhba	(Russia)	MF	16 March 1990 (aged 20)	Dynamo Moscow	2010		0	0
55	Aleksandr Tumasyan	(Russia)	MF	15 October 1992 (aged 18)	Youth Team	2010		0	0
56	David Tkebuchava	(Russia)	MF	17 January 1991 (aged 19)	Youth Team	2010		0	0
77	Stanislav Ivanov	(Moldova)	MF	7 October 1980 (aged 30)	loan from Lokomotiv Moscow	2010		9	0
81	Dragan Blatnjak	(Bosnia and Herzegovina)	MF	1 August 1981 (aged 29)	Khimki	2010		24	1
84	Alexandru Gațcan	(Moldova)	MF	27 March 1984 (aged 26)	Rubin Kazan	2008			
Forwards
9	Roman Adamov	(Russia)	FW	21 June 1982 (aged 28)	loan from Rubin Kazan	2010			
10	Dmitri Akimov	(Russia)	FW	14 September 1980 (aged 30)	Sibir Novosibirsk	2008			
11	Igor Lebedenko	(Russia)	FW	27 May 1983 (aged 27)	Saturn Ramenskoye	2009	2009	62	8
15	Aleksei Sugak	(Russia)	FW	27 February 1990 (aged 20)	Youth Team	2009		2	0
19	Mersudin Ahmetović	(Bosnia and Herzegovina)	FW	19 March 1985 (aged 25)	Sloboda Tuzla	2008			
21	Hong Yong-jo	(North Korea)	FW	22 May 1982 (aged 28)	Bežanija	2008			
28	Artyom Serdyuk	(Russia)	FW	22 January 1990 (aged 20)	Youth Team	2009			
39	Mirzaga Huseynpur	(Russia)	FW	11 March 1990 (aged 20)	Youth Team	2010		0	0
42	Anton Kabanov	(Russia)	FW	11 February 1991 (aged 19)	Kuban Krasnodar	2010		0	0
44	Magomed Kurbanov	(Azerbaijan)	FW	11 April 1992 (aged 18)	Youth Team	2009		0	0
Out on loan
27	Maksim Kabanov	(Russia)	GK	30 December 1982 (aged 27)	SKA-Energia	2009		0	0
43	Kirill Zaika	(Russia)	FW	7 October 1992 (aged 18)	Youth Team	2009		0	0
47	Vladimir Shamara	(Russia)	DF	14 February 1992 (aged 18)	Youth Team	2009		0	0
57	Astemir Sheriyev	(Russia)	DF	23 February 1990 (aged 20)	Spartak Nalchik	2009		9	0
87	Yevgeni Lutsenko	(Russia)	FW	25 February 1987 (aged 23)	Stavropolye-2009	2009		11	0
Left during the season
6	Roman Lengyel	(Czech Republic)	DF	3 November 1978 (aged 32)	Kuban Krasnodar	2009	2010	31	0
46	Constantin Iavorschi	(Moldova)	FW	16 March 1990 (aged 20)	Lokomotiv Moscow	2010		0	0
51	Stanislav Engovatov	(Russia)	DF	3 April 1991 (aged 19)	Smena-Zenit St. Petersburg	2010		0	0
52	Andrei Semenchuk	(Russia)	DF	15 February 1990 (aged 20)	Smena-Zenit St. Petersburg	2010		0	0

== Transfers ==
=== Winter ===
In: Note: Flags indicate national team as defined under FIFA eligibility rules; some limited exceptions apply. Players may hold more than one non-FIFA nationality.

No.	Pos.	Nation	Player
1	GK	BLR	Anton Amelchenko (from (Russia) Moscow)
2	MF	BLR	Timofei Kalachev (from (Russia) Krylia Sovetov Samara)
4	DF	NGR	Isaac Okoronkwo (from (Russia) Moscow)
8	DF	RUS	Gia Grigalava (on loan from (Russia) SKA Rostov-on-Don)
9	FW	RUS	Roman Adamov (on loan from (Russia) Rubin Kazan)
14	DF	RUS	Anri Khagush (on loan from (Russia) Rubin Kazan)
17	DF	RUS	Sergei Shustikov (from (Russia) Krylia Sovetov Samara)
22	GK	SRB	Dejan Radić (from (Russia) Spartak Nalchik)
24	DF	ROU	Sorin Ghionea (from (Romania) Steaua București)
27	GK	RUS	Maksim Kabanov (from (Russia) SKA-Energiya Khabarovsk)
28	FW	RUS	Artyom Serdyuk (from (Russia) Taganrog)
33	MF	RUS	Sergei Tumasyan (from (Russia) SKA Rostov)
34	DF	UKR	Andriy Proshyn (from (Russia) Alania Vladikavkaz)
36	DF	RUS	Igor Gubanov
39	MF	RUS	Mirzaga Huseynpur (from (Russia) MITOS Novocherkassk)
40	MF	RUS	Igor Ponomaryov
41	MF	RUS	Khoren Bairamyan
42	FW	RUS	Anton Kabanov (from (Russia) Kuban Krasnodar)
43	FW	RUS	Kirill Zaika
45	MF	RUS	Oleg Solonukha
46	FW	RUS	Konstantin Yavorskiy (from (Russia) Lokomotiv-2 Moscow)
48	DF	RUS	Aleksandr Mitkin (from (Russia) Smena-Zenit St. Petersburg)
49	MF	RUS	Nikita Vasilyev
50	MF	RUS	Irakli Khokhba
51	DF	RUS	Stanislav Engovatov (from (Russia) Smena-Zenit St. Petersburg)
52	DF	RUS	Andrei Semenchuk (from (Russia) Smena-Zenit St. Petersburg)
53	DF	RUS	Sergei Kharlamov
77	MF	MDA	Stanislav Ivanov (on loan from (Russia) Lokomotiv Moscow)
81	MF	BIH	Dragan Blatnjak (from (Russia) Moscow)

Out: Note: Flags indicate national team as defined under FIFA eligibility rules; some limited exceptions apply. Players may hold more than one non-FIFA nationality.

No.	Pos.	Nation	Player
1	GK	RUS	Roman Gerus (to (Kazakhstan) Lokomotiv Astana)
8	MF	RUS	Maksim Astafyev (to (Russia) Sibir Novosibirsk)
10	MF	RUS	Mikhail Osinov (to (Russia) Ural Sverdlovsk Oblast)
12	MF	RUS	Pyotr Gitselov (end of loan from (Russia) Rubin Kazan)
18	MF	SRB	Branimir Petrović (to (Russia) Krylia Sovetov Samara)
24	MF	RUS	Sergey Kuznetsov (to (Russia) Khimki)
27	GK	RUS	Stanislav Khoteyev (to (Russia) Shinnik Yaroslavl)
32	DF	RUS	Vladislav Dubovoy (to (Russia) MITOS Novocherkassk)
37	FW	RUS	Sergey Chernyshev
40	MF	RUS	Maksim Kalmykov
42	MF	RUS	Yevgeni Matrakhov (to (Russia) Vityaz Podolsk)
43	FW	RUS	Mikhail Ignatov (to (Russia) Vityaz Podolsk)
44	GK	RUS	Artyom Nazarov (to (Russia) Vityaz Podolsk)
45	MF	RUS	Ilya Bannov (to (Russia) Vityaz Podolsk)
46	DF	RUS	Aleksandr Vasilyev (to (Russia) Vityaz Podolsk)
48	MF	RUS	Maksim Levchenko (to (Russia) MITOS Novocherkassk)
49	DF	RUS	Aleksei Sizintsev
50	FW	RUS	Vitali Kirichenko
52	MF	RUS	Artyom Syomka
54	DF	RUS	Ivan Lapin (end of loan from (Russia) Zenit Saint Petersburg)
57	DF	RUS	Astemir Sheriyev (on loan to (Russia) Nizhny Novgorod)
58	DF	RUS	Aleksei Klubkov
59	DF	RUS	Taymuraz Kozayev
60	FW	RUS	Dmitri Kortava (to (Russia) Sportakademklub Moscow)
62	DF	RUS	Kirill Chekmaryov
63	MF	RUS	Andrei Lyakh (to (Lithuania) FK Vėtra)
83	DF	RUS	Mikhail Rozhkov (to (Kazakhstan) Lokomotiv Astana)
85	MF	SRB	Nenad Šljivić (to (Serbia) Jagodina)
88	FW	RUS	Aleksandr Salugin (end of loan from (Russia) Krylia Sovetov Samara)
—	FW	RUS	Mikhail Kozlov (to (Russia) Dynamo Saint Petersburg, previously on loan at (Russia) Vityaz Podolsk)
—	FW	RUS	Yakov Ehrlich (to (Russia) FC Rotor Volgograd, previously on loan)

=== Summer ===
In: Note: Flags indicate national team as defined under FIFA eligibility rules; some limited exceptions apply. Players may hold more than one non-FIFA nationality.

No.	Pos.	Nation	Player
23	MF	BUL	Chavdar Yankov (on loan from (Ukraine) Metalurh Donetsk)
55	MF	RUS	Aleksandr Tumasyan
56	MF	RUS	David Tkebuchava

Out: Note: Flags indicate national team as defined under FIFA eligibility rules; some limited exceptions apply. Players may hold more than one non-FIFA nationality.

No.	Pos.	Nation	Player
6	DF	CZE	Roman Lengyel (to (Czech Republic) Dynamo České Budějovice)
27	GK	RUS	Maksim Kabanov (on loan to (Russia) Salyut Belgorod)
43	FW	RUS	Kirill Zaika (on loan to (Russia) Taganrog)
46	FW	RUS	Konstantin Yavorskiy
47	DF	RUS	Vladimir Shamara (on loan to (Russia) Taganrog)
51	DF	RUS	Stanislav Engovatov (to (Russia) Dynamo Vologda)
52	DF	RUS	Andrei Semenchuk
87	FW	RUS	Yevgeni Lutsenko (on loan to (Russia) Salyut Belgorod)

== Competitions ==
=== Overview ===
Competition	First match	Last match	Starting round	Final position	Record							
Competition	First match	Last match	Starting round	Final position	Pld	W	D	L	GF	GA	GD	Win %
Premier League	13 March 2010	28 November 2010	Matchday 1	9th	30	10	4	16	27	44	−17	33.33
Russian Cup	15 July 2009	15 July 2009	Last 32	Round of 16	2	2	0	0	6	0	+6	100.00
Total					32	12	4	16	33	44	−11	37.50

Last updated: 28 November 2010
Source: See Results

=== Premier League ===
==== Results by round ====
Round	1	2	3	4	5	6	7	8	9	10	11	12	13	14	15	16	17	18	19	20	21	22	23	24	25	26	27	28	29	30
Ground	H	A	H	A	H	A	H	A	H	H	A	H	A	H	A	H	A	H	A	H	A	H	A	A	H	A	H	A	H	A
Result	L	D	W	L	W	W	L	L	W	L	W	W	L	L	W	W	W	D	L	W	D	L	L	L	L	L	D	L	L	L
Position	14	14	10	12	10	5	6	8	6	7	6	5	6	7	5	5	5	5	5	5	4	5	6	7	8	8	8	8	8	9

Updated to match(es) played on 28 November 2010. Source: See Results
A = Away; H = Home; W = Win; D = Draw; L = Loss

==== Results ====
13 March 2010 1	Rostov	0–2	Tom Tomsk	Rostov-on-Don
18:30 MSK (UTC+4)		Summary	Kornilenko 63', 87'	Stadium: Olimp-2; Attendance: 8,000; Referee: Aleksnadr Kolobaev

20 March 2010 2	Terek Grozny	1–1	Rostov	Grozny
15:15 MSK (UTC+4)	Asildarov 4'; Yatchenko (yellow card) 22'	Summary	Lebedenko (yellow card) 18'; Ivanov (yellow card) 27'; Radić (yellow card) 37'; Adamov (yellow card) 58'; Pavlenko (yellow card) 66'; Kalachou (yellow card) 69'; Gațcan (yellow card) 78'; Ahmetović 81'; Anđelković (yellow card) 82'	Stadium: Sultan Bilimkhanov Stadium; Attendance: 9,350; Referee: Yuri Baskakov

28 March 2010 3	Rostov	1–0	Saturn	Rostov-on-Don
19:00 MSK (UTC+4)	Pavlenko 17' (yellow card) 53'; Kalachou (yellow card) 55'; Cherkes (yellow card) 61'; Radić (yellow card) 88'; Kulchy (yellow card) 89'	Summary	Bryzgalov (yellow card) 39'	Stadium: Olimp-2; Attendance: 9,200; Referee: Vladimir Pettay

3 April 2010 4	Spartak Nalchik	5–2	Rostov	Nalchik
18:30 MSK (UTC+4)	Siradze 4'; Leandro 13' (pen.); Amisulashvili 52' (pen.); Dyadyun 67', 81'; Malyarov (yellow card) 78'	Summary	Kulchy (yellow card) 26'; Ahmetović 64'; Adamov 79' (pen.); Gațcan (yellow card) 90'	Stadium: Spartak Stadium; Attendance: 8,000; Referee: Stanislav Sukhina

11 April 2010 5	Rostov	2–1	Amkar Perm	Rostov-on-Don
18:30 MSK (UTC+4)	Ahmetović 13'; Akimov (yellow card) 71'; Anđelković 83'	Summary	Popov (yellow card) 33'; Sokolov 57' (yellow card) 60'; Knežević (yellow card) 80'	Stadium: Olimp-2; Attendance: 9,500; Referee: Nikolai Ivanov

19 April 2010 6	Anzhi Makhachkala	1–2	Rostov	Makhachkala
17:00 MSK (UTC+4)	Agalarov (yellow card) 14'; Khojava (yellow card) 45'; Tsorayev 47'	Summary	Adamov 61'; Kalachev 85'; Pavlenko (yellow card) 90'	Stadium: Dynamo Stadium; Attendance: 12,000; Referee: Almir Kayumov

25 April 2010 7	Rostov	0–1	Alania Vladikavkaz	Rostov-on-Don
20:45 MSK (UTC+4)	Grigalava (yellow card) 47'; Khagush (yellow card) 83'	Summary	Stoyanov 13'; Gnanou (yellow card) 32'; Florescu (yellow card) 77'	Stadium: Olimp-2; Attendance: 12,000; Referee: Alexey Nikolaev

2 May 2010 8	Sibir Novosibirsk	2–0	Rostov	Novosibirsk
11:30 MSK (UTC+4)	Aravin (yellow card) 52'; Medvedev 57'; Makarenko (yellow card) 74'; Nagibin 87'	Summary	Grigalava (yellow card) 40'; Adamov (yellow card) 61'; Gațcan (yellow card) 89'	Stadium: Spartak Stadium; Attendance: 10,000; Referee: Yuri Baskakov

6 May 2010 9	Rostov	1–0	CSKA Moscow	Rostov-on-Don
16:30 MSK (UTC+4)	Ivanov (yellow card) 14'; Ahmetović 68'; Gațcan (yellow card) 84'	Summary	Šemberas (yellow card) 17' (yellow-red card) 83'	Stadium: Olimp-2; Attendance: 14,300; Referee: Vyacheslav Popov

10 May 2010 10	Rostov	0–2	Rubin Kazan	Rostov-on-Don
18:30 MSK (UTC+4)	Pavlenko (yellow card) 79'	Summary	Bukharov (yellow card) 37' (goal) 76'; Semak 63'; Noboa (yellow card) 85'	Stadium: Olimp-2; Attendance: 12,500; Referee: Nikolai Ivanov

14 May 2010 11	Krylia Sovetov	1–2	Rostov	Samara
20:30 MSK (UTC+4)	Alkhazov 59'; Savin (yellow card) 87'; Drmić (yellow card) 90'	Summary	Gațcan (yellow card) 4'; Adamov 21', 46'; Živanović (yellow card) 45'; Lutsenko (yellow card) 72'; Cherkes (yellow card) 77'	Stadium: Metallurg Stadium; Attendance: 10,300; Referee: Sergey Karasev

9 July 2010 12	Rostov	1–0	Spartak Moscow	Rostov-on-Don
21:00 MSK (UTC+4)	Kulchy 13'; Gațcan (yellow card) 63' (yellow-red card) 81'; Anđelković (yellow card) 87'; Amelchenko (yellow card) 90'	Summary	Kudryashov (yellow card) 5'; Suchý (yellow card) 45'; Sheshukov (yellow card) 89'	Stadium: Olimp-2; Attendance: 14,500; Referee: Igor Egorov

17 July 2010 13	Dynamo Moscow	3–2	Rostov	Khimki
21:00 MSK (UTC+4)	Kolodin 23'; Voronin 31'; Granat (yellow card) 44' (goal) 55'; Ropotan (yellow card) 72'	Summary	Adamov 11'; Lebedenko 42'; Pavlenko (yellow card) 65'; Živanović (yellow card) 70'	Stadium: Arena Khimki; Attendance: 5,517; Referee: Alexander Gvardis

24 July 2010 14	Rostov	1–3	Zenit St.Petersburg	Rostov-on-Don
20:30 MSK (UTC+4)	Gațcan (yellow card) 56'; Cherkes (yellow card) 64'; Lebedenko 89' (pen.)	Summary	Kerzhakov 45'; Danny 50'; Fayzulin 70'; Ionov (yellow card) 89'	Stadium: Olimp-2; Attendance: 14,500; Referee: Aleksandr Kolobaev

1 August 2010 15	Lokomotiv Moscow	0–1	Rostov	Moscow
21:00 MSK (UTC+4)	Aliyev (yellow card) 53' (yellow-red card) 72'; Sychev (yellow card) 80'	Summary	Valikayev 35'; Amelchenko (yellow card) 84'	Stadium: Lokomotiv Stadium; Attendance: 12,500; Referee: Mikhail Vilkov

6 August 2010 16	Rostov	1–0	Terek Grozny	Rostov-on-Don
21:00 MSK (UTC+4)	Pavlenko 75'	Summary	Amelyanchuk (yellow card) 25'	Stadium: Olimp-2; Attendance: 12,000; Referee: Evgeny Turbin

14 August 2010 17	Saturn	0–2	Rostov	Ramenskoye
19:30 MSK (UTC+4)	Nakhushev (red card) 62'; Karyaka (yellow card) 90'	Summary	Adamov 1'; Khagush (yellow card) 45'; Živanović (yellow card) 59'; Blatnjak (red card) 62'; Lebedenko 73'; Gațcan (yellow card) 90'; Proshyn (yellow card) 90'	Stadium: Saturn Stadium; Attendance: 6,500; Referee: Maxim Layushkin

20 August 2010 18	Rostov	1–1	Spartak Nalchik	Rostov-on-Don
21:00 MSK (UTC+4)	Kulchy (yellow card) 23'; Adamov (yellow card) 53' (goal) 87' (pen.); Gațcan (yellow card) 79'; Živanović (yellow card) 90'	Summary	Kontsedalov 5'; Vasin (yellow card) 53' (yellow-red card) 85'; Fredrikson (yellow card) 73'	Stadium: Olimp-2; Attendance: 13,500; Referee: Vyacheslav Kharlamov

28 August 2010 19	Amkar Perm	1–0	Rostov	Perm
16:15 MSK (UTC+4)	Peev 24'	Summary	Proshyn (yellow card) 60'; Ahmetović (yellow card) 78'	Stadium: Zvezda Stadium; Attendance: 8,200; Referee: Almir Kayumov

12 September 2010 20	Rostov	1–0	Anzhi Makhachkala	Rostov-on-Don
19:45 MSK (UTC+4)	Kalachou 56'; Khagush (yellow card) 82'	Summary	Kébé (yellow card) 72'	Stadium: Olimp-2; Attendance: 11,500; Referee: Yuri Baskakov

18 September 2010 21	Alania Vladikavkaz	0–0	Rostov	Vladikavkaz
17:15 MSK (UTC+4)	Gnanou (yellow card) 48'; Florescu (yellow card) 85'	Summary		Stadium: Republican Spartak Stadium; Attendance: 10,000; Referee: Aleksandr Kolobaev

26 September 2010 22	Rostov	0–1	Sibir Novosibirsk	Rostov-on-Don
18:00 MSK (UTC+4)	Kulchy (yellow card) 43'; Okoronkwo (yellow card) 45'	Summary	Šumulikoski (yellow card) 7'; Grzelak 37'; Aravin (yellow card) 64'; Astafyev (yellow card) 77'	Stadium: Olimp-2; Attendance: 11,000; Referee: Evgeny Turbin

3 October 2010 23	CSKA Moscow	2–0	Rostov	Khimki
15:00 MSK (UTC+4)	Love 36', 44' (pen.) (yellow card) 45'	Summary	Gațcan (yellow card) 15'; Kalachou (yellow card) 42'; Khagush (yellow card) 43'	Stadium: Arena Khimki; Attendance: 4,740; Referee: Vyacheslav Popov

16 October 2010 24	Rubin Kazan	2–1	Rostov	Kazan
MSK (UTC+4)	Natcho 10'; Martins 12'; Navas (yellow card) 21'; Medvedev (yellow card) 50'; Balyaikin (yellow card) 84' (yellow-red card) 86'; Ryzhikov (yellow card) 90'	Summary	Pavlenko 3'; Cherkes (yellow card) 44'; Okoronkwo (yellow card) 66'; Gațcan (yellow card) 71'	Stadium: Central Stadium; Attendance: 11,480; Referee: Maxim Layushkin

24 October 2010 25	Rostov	1–2	Krylia Sovetov	Rostov-on-Don
18:45 MSK (UTC+4)	Adamov 37'; Gațcan (yellow card) 57'; Anđelković (yellow card) 79'	Summary	Đorđević 10'; Yakovlev 71'	Stadium: Olimp-2; Attendance: 9,800; Referee: Sergey Karasev

30 October 2010 26	Spartak Moscow	2–1	Rostov	Moscow
20:30 MSK (UTC+4)	Khodyrev (yellow card) 9'; Welliton 39'; Sheshukov (yellow card) 79'; McGeady 90' (pen.)	Summary	Khagush 24'; Gațcan (yellow card) 31'; Ghionea (yellow card) 42'; Okoronkwo (yellow card) 90'	Stadium: Luzhniki Stadium; Attendance: 10,900; Referee: Alexander Gvardis

6 November 2010 27	Rostov	1–1	Dynamo Moscow	Rostov-on-Don
19:30 MSK (UTC+4)	Khagush (yellow card) 24'; Kulchy (yellow card) 32'; Yankov 36' (yellow card) 90'	Summary	Voronin 9'; Samedov 51'	Stadium: Olimp-2; Attendance: 10,000; Referee: Vitaly Meshkov

14 November 2010 28	Zenit St.Petersburg	5–0	Rostov	Saint Petersburg
16:00 MSK (UTC+4)	Lazović 40' (pen.); Semak 75'; Kerzhakov 82' (yellow card) 82'; Bukharov 90', 90'	Summary	Ghionea (yellow card) 39'; Kalachou (yellow card) 39' (yellow-red card) 85'; Khagush (yellow card) 57'; Yankov (yellow card) 69'	Stadium: Petrovsky Stadium; Attendance: 20,500; Referee: Yuri Baskakov

20 November 2010 29	Rostov	1–2	Lokomotiv Moscow	Rostov-on-Don
25:00 MSK (UTC+4)	Živanović (yellow card) 22'; Blatnjak 59'; Khagush (yellow card) 75'	Summary	Sychev 53'; Rodolfo (yellow card) 53' (goal) 61'; Shishkin (yellow card) 58'; Guilherme (yellow card) 90'	Stadium: Olimp-2; Attendance: 8,200; Referee: Nikolai Ivanov

28 November 2010 30	Tom Tomsk	3–1	Rostov	Tomsk
15:00 MSK (UTC+4)	Stroyev (yellow card) 54'; Kharitonov 57', 79'; Klimov (yellow card) 85'; Kovalchuk 90'	Summary	Lebedenko (yellow card) 29'; Grigalava (yellow card) 52'; Yankov 55' (yellow card) 90'; Blatnjak (yellow card) 85'; Gațcan (yellow card) 85'	Stadium: Trud Stadium; Attendance: 10,000; Referee: Vladimir Pettay

==== League table ====
Pos	Team	Pld	W	D	L	GF	GA	GD	Pts	Qualification or relegation
7	Dynamo Moscow	30	9	13	8	38	31	+7	40	
8	Tom Tomsk	30	10	7	13	35	43	−8	37	
9	Rostov	30	10	4	16	27	44	−17	34	
10	Saturn	30	8	10	12	27	38	−11	34	Team disbanded after season (Note: Saturn Moscow Oblast were disbanded at the end of the season after amassing debts of RUB 800m.)
11	Anzhi Makhachkala	30	9	6	15	29	39	−10	33	

Source: RFPL (in Russian)
Rules for classification: 1st points; 2nd matches won; 3rd head-to-head (points, matches won, goal difference, goals scored, away goals scored); 4th goal difference; 5th goals scored; 6th away goals scored; 7th position in previous season or decision game

=== Russian Cup ===
13 July 2010 Round of 32	Salyut Belgorod	0–4	Rostov	Moscow
19:00 MSK (UTC+4)		Summary	Grigalava (yellow card) 20'; Ghionea (yellow card) 21'; Proshyn (yellow card) 47'; Adamov 75'; Akimov 82'; Khagush 87'; Lebedenko 89'	Stadium: Eduard Streltsov Stadium; Attendance: 8,000; Referee: Vyacheslav Kharlamov

22 September 2010 Round of 16	Rostov	2–0	Volgar-Gazprom	Rostov-on-Don
18:30 MSK (UTC+4)	Pavlenko 49', 63' (yellow card) 65'	Summary	Marushchak (yellow card) 8'; Samoylov (yellow card) 30'	Stadium: Olimp-2; Attendance: 4,500; Referee: Vitali Meshkov

The Quarterfinal took place during the 2011–12 season.

== Squad statistics ==
As of match played 28 November 2010

=== Appearances and goals ===
No.	Pos	Nat	Player	Total		Premier League		Russian Cup	
No.	Pos	Nat	Player	Apps	Goals	Apps	Goals	Apps	Goals
1	GK	(Belarus) BLR	Anton Amelchenko	23	0	23	0	0	0
2	MF	(Belarus) BLR	Timofei Kalachev	18	2	16+1	2	0+1	0
3	DF	(Serbia) SRB	Dušan Anđelković	26	1	26	1	0	0
4	DF	(Nigeria) NGR	Isaac Okoronkwo	22	0	22	0	0	0
5	DF	(Russia) RUS	Aleksandr Cherkes	16	0	15	0	1	0
7	MF	(Belarus) BLR	Alyaksandr Kulchy	27	1	25	1	1+1	0
8	DF	(Russia) RUS	Gia Grigalava	11	0	8+1	0	2	0
9	FW	(Russia) RUS	Roman Adamov	26	9	24	8	1+1	1
10	FW	(Russia) RUS	Dmitri Akimov	13	1	5+6	0	2	1
11	MF	(Russia) RUS	Igor Lebedenko	32	4	29+1	3	1+1	1
14	DF	(Russia) RUS	Anri Khagush	21	2	16+4	1	1	1
15	FW	(Russia) RUS	Aleksei Sugak	2	0	0+2	0	0	0
19	FW	(Bosnia and Herzegovina) BIH	Mersudin Ahmetović	30	4	5+23	4	1+1	0
20	MF	(Russia) RUS	Artur Valikayev	8	1	5+2	1	1	0
21	FW	(North Korea) PRK	Hong Yong-jo	1	0	0+1	0	0	0
22	GK	(Serbia) SRB	Dejan Radić	9	0	7	0	2	0
23	MF	(Bulgaria) BUL	Chavdar Yankov	12	2	8+3	2	1	0
24	DF	(Romania) ROU	Sorin Ghionea	20	0	18	0	2	0
25	MF	(Russia) RUS	Aleksandr Pavlenko	26	5	18+6	3	2	2
26	DF	(Serbia) SRB	Ivan Živanović	16	0	14+1	0	1	0
33	DF	(Russia) RUS	Sergei Tumasyan	3	0	0+2	0	0+1	0
34	DF	(Ukraine) UKR	Andriy Proshyn	4	0	1+2	0	1	0
38	DF	(Russia) RUS	Anri Khagba	1	0	0+1	0	0	0
77	MF	(Moldova) MDA	Stanislav Ivanov	9	0	6+3	0	0	0
81	MF	(Bosnia and Herzegovina) BIH	Dragan Blatnjak	24	1	12+11	1	1	0
84	MF	(Moldova) MDA	Alexandru Gațcan	24	0	24	0	0	0
Players away from Rostov on loan:
87	FW	(Russia) RUS	Yevgeni Lutsenko	5	0	2+3	0	0	0
Players who appeared for Rostov but left during the season:
6	DF	(Czech Republic) CZE	Roman Lengyel	3	0	1+1	0	1	0

=== Goal Scorers ===
Place	Position	Nation	Number	Name	Premier League	Russian Cup	Total
1	FW	(Russia)	9	Roman Adamov	8	1	9
2	MF	(Russia)	25	Aleksandr Pavlenko	3	2	5
3	FW	(Bosnia and Herzegovina)	19	Mersudin Ahmetović	4	0	4
3	MF	(Russia)	11	Igor Lebedenko	3	1	4
5	MF	(Belarus)	2	Tsimafei Kalachou	2	0	2
5	MF	(Bulgaria)	23	Chavdar Yankov	2	0	2
5	DF	(Russia)	14	Anri Khagush	1	1	2
8	MF	(Serbia)	3	Dušan Anđelković	1	0	1
8	MF	(Belarus)	7	Alyaksandr Kulchy	1	0	1
8	MF	(Russia)	20	Artur Valikayev	1	0	1
8	MF	(Bosnia and Herzegovina)	81	Dragan Blatnjak	1	0	1
8	FW	(Russia)	10	Dmitri Akimov	0	1	1
				TOTALS	27	6	33

=== Clean sheets ===
Place	Position	Nation	Number	Name	Premier League	Russian Cup	Total
1	GK	(Belarus)	1	Anton Amelchenko	7	0	7
2	GK	(Serbia)	22	Dejan Radić	1	2	3
TOTALS					8	2	10

=== Disciplinary record ===
Number	Nation	Position	Name	Premier League		Russian Cup		Total	
Number	Nation	Position	Name	Yellow card	Red card	Yellow card	Red card	Yellow card	Red card
1	(Belarus)	GK	Anton Amelchenko	2	0	0	0	2	0
2	(Belarus)	MF	Timofei Kalachev	4	1	0	0	4	1
3	(Serbia)	DF	Dušan Anđelković	3	0	0	0	3	0
4	(Nigeria)	DF	Isaac Okoronkwo	2	0	0	0	2	0
5	(Russia)	DF	Aleksandr Cherkes	4	0	0	0	4	0
7	(Belarus)	MF	Alyaksandr Kulchy	5	0	0	0	5	0
8	(Russia)	DF	Gia Grigalava	3	0	1	0	4	0
9	(Russia)	FW	Roman Adamov	4	0	0	0	4	0
10	(Russia)	FW	Dmitri Akimov	1	0	0	0	1	0
11	(Russia)	MF	Igor Lebedenko	2	0	0	0	2	0
14	(Russia)	DF	Anri Khagush	7	0	0	0	7	0
19	(Bosnia and Herzegovina)	FW	Mersudin Ahmetović	1	0	0	0	1	0
22	(Serbia)	GK	Dejan Radić	2	0	0	0	2	0
23	(Bulgaria)	MF	Chavdar Yankov	3	0	0	0	3	0
24	(Romania)	DF	Sorin Ghionea	2	0	1	0	3	0
25	(Russia)	MF	Aleksandr Pavlenko	5	0	1	0	6	0
26	(Serbia)	DF	Ivan Živanović	5	0	0	0	5	0
34	(Ukraine)	DF	Andriy Proshyn	2	0	1	0	3	0
77	(Moldova)	MF	Stanislav Ivanov	2	0	0	0	2	0
81	(Bosnia and Herzegovina)	MF	Dragan Blatnjak	1	1	0	0	1	1
84	(Moldova)	MF	Alexandru Gațcan	14	1	0	0	14	1
Players away on loan:
87	(Russia)	FW	Yevgeni Lutsenko	1	0	0	0	1	0
Players who left Rostov during the season:
			TOTALS	75	3	4	0	79	3
