= Aleksandr Tumasyan =

Aleksandr Tumasyan may refer to:

== Association football ==
- Aleksandr Aleksandrovich Tumasyan, Armenian player born in 1992
- Aleksandr Sergeyevich Tumasyan, Russian coach born in 1955
