= Soslan =

- Language: Ossetian

Origin
- Origin: Turkic
- Region of origin: North Caucasus

Other names
- Alternative spelling: Сослaн
- Variant forms: Sosruqo, Sozyryqo, Sozuruqo

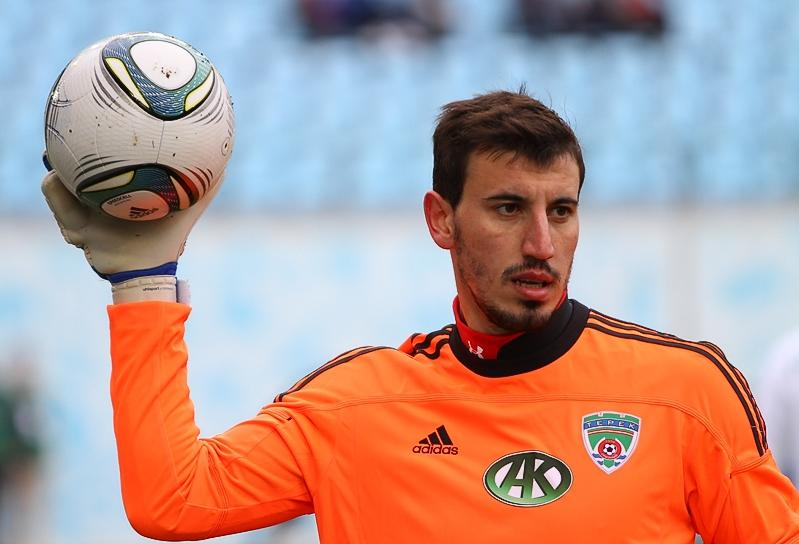
Soslan Dzhanayev, Russian footballer

Soslan (Iron Ossetic: Сосла́н) is an Ossetian male given name widespread among Ossetians in Russia.

== Origin ==
This given name originates from the Ossetian name for Sosruqo, a character in North Caucasian mythology, in particular, in the Nart saga. It etymologically came from Turkic languages (Nogai suslan- "to look menacing", suslä "menacing, gloomy"). The variant Sosruqo is in turn an Adyghe borrowing from Sosru- (< Soslan) and qo (qwā) "son".

In Ossetia, the name has been in use since at least the 12th century. The first documented person with this name was David Soslan, the second husband of the Georgian Queen Tamar.

== Forms ==
The Russian patronymic forms are Soslanovich (Russian: Сосла́нович) for men and Soslanovna (Russian: Сосла́новна) for women.

== Notable people ==
- Soslan Andiyev, Soviet wrestler
- Soslan Beriyev, Russian footballer
- Soslan Dzhanaev, Russian footballer
- Soslan Dzhioyev (footballer born 1989), Russian footballer
- Soslan Dzhioyev (footballer born 1993), Russian footballer
- Soslan Gatagov, Russian footballer
- Soslan Gattsiev, Uzbek-Belarusian wrestler
- Soslan Kachmazov, Russian footballer
- Soslan Kagermazov, Russian footballer
- Soslan Ktsoyev, Russian wrestler
- Soslan Ramonov, Russian wrestler
- Soslan Takazov, Russian footballer
- Soslan Tigiev, Uzbekistani wrestler
- Soslan Tsirikhov, Russian shot put athlete
- Soslan Daurov, Belarusian wrestler
