= Dzhioyev =

Dzhioyev (Ossetian: Джиотæ, Russian: Джио́ев) is a Russian variation of an Ossetic surname that may refer to:

- Georgi Dzhioyev (born 1986), Russian footballer
- Inal Dzhioyev (born 1969), Russian footballer
- Soslan Tamerlanovich Dzhioyev (born 1989), Russian footballer
- Soslan Vyacheslavovich Dzhioyev (born 1993), Russian footballer
- Stanislav Dzhioyev (born 1989), Russian footballer
