= Soslan Dzhioyev =

Soslan Dzhioyev may refer to:

- Soslan Dzhioyev (footballer, born 1989), Russian footballer
- Soslan Dzhioyev (footballer, born 1993), Russian footballer
