= Drmić =

Drmić or Drmic is a surname.

It may refer to:

- Anthony Drmic (born 1992), Australian basketball player
- Frank Drmic (born 1978), Australian basketball player
- Goran Drmić (born 1988), Bosnian footballer
- Josip Drmić (born 1992), Swiss footballer
