= Soslan (disambiguation) =

Soslan may refer to:

- Soslan, a Russian/Uzbek/Ossetian male given name
- Soslan, the Ossetian name of Sosruko, a character in Caucasian mythology
- David Soslan, an Alan prince involved in Georgia's 12th century wars
