= Roman Panin =

Roman Panin may refer to:

- Roman Ivanovich Panin (1897 - 1949), Soviet military general
- Roman Petrovich Panin (b. 1989), Russian footballer
