= Denis Tumasyan =

Russian footballer

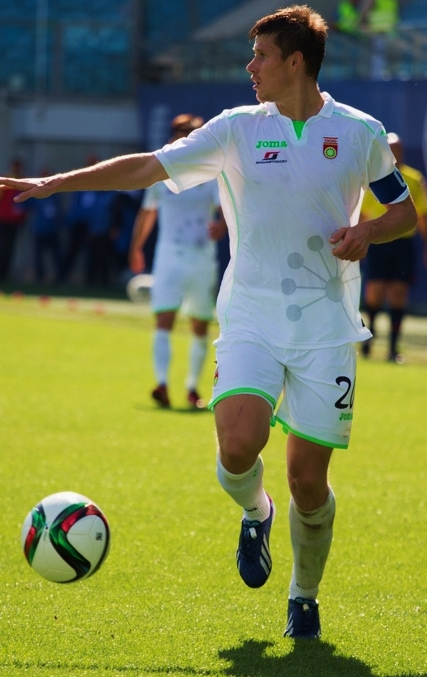
- Tumasyan with FC Ufa in 2015

Personal information
- Full name: Denis Aleksandrovich Tumasyan
- Date of birth: 24 April 1985 (age 41)
- Place of birth: Kiev, Ukrainian SSR, Soviet Union
- Height: 1.85 m (6 ft 1 in)
- Position: Defender

Team information
- Current team: Chayka Peschanokopskoye (assistant coach)

Senior career*
Years	Team	Apps	(Gls)
2002–2004	Rostov-on-Don	31	(2)
2004	JBK	12	(6)
2004–2005	Jaro	27	(1)
2006–2008	Torpedo Moscow	81	(4)
2009–2015	Ural Sverdlovsk Oblast	113	(13)
2014–2015	→ Ufa (loan)	21	(2)
2015–2018	Ufa	43	(1)
2019	Alashkert	11	(1)
2019–2020	Chayka Peschanokopskoye	17	(1)

Managerial career
- 2020–: Chayka Peschanokopskoye (assistant)
- * Club domestic league appearances and goals

Denis Aleksandrovich Tumasyan (Russian: Денис Александрович Тумасян, Armenian: Դենիս Ալեքսանդրի Թումասյան; born 24 April 1985) is a Russian football coach and a former player of Armenian descent who played as a centre-back. He is an assistant coach with FC Chayka Peschanokopskoye.

== Club career ==
He made his Russian Premier League debut for FC Torpedo Moscow on 17 March 2006 in a game against FC Tom Tomsk.

On 27 January 2019, FC Ufa announced that Tumasyan was released from his contract by mutual consent to join Armenian club FC Alashkert.

== Personal life ==
Denis is the older brother of Aleksandr and Sergei Tumasyan and a son of Aleksandr Tumasyan.

== Career statistics ==
=== Club ===
As of 11 June 2024

Club	Season	League			Cup		Continental		Total	
Club	Season	Division	Apps	Goals	Apps	Goals	Apps	Goals	Apps	Goals
Rostov-on-Don	2002	FNL	3	0	0	0	–		3	0
Rostov-on-Don	2003	PFL	28	2	0	0	–		28	2
Rostov-on-Don	Total		31	2	0	0	0	0	31	2
JBK	2004	Kakkonen	12	6	–		–		12	6
Jaro	2004	Veikkausliiga	6	1	0	0	–		6	1
Jaro	2005	Veikkausliiga	21	0	0	0	–		21	0
Jaro	Total		27	1	0	0	0	0	27	1
Torpedo Moscow	2006	Russian Premier League	17	1	3	0	–		20	1
Torpedo Moscow	2007	FNL	34	3	1	0	–		35	3
Torpedo Moscow	2008	FNL	30	0	1	0	–		31	0
Torpedo Moscow	Total		81	4	5	0	0	0	86	4
Ural Yekaterinburg	2009	FNL	6	0	0	0	–		6	0
Ural Yekaterinburg	2010	FNL	33	1	0	0	–		33	1
Ural Yekaterinburg	2011–12	FNL	38	4	1	0	–		39	4
Ural Yekaterinburg	2012–13	FNL	22	6	1	0	–		23	6
Ural Yekaterinburg	2013–14	Russian Premier League	14	2	1	0	–		15	2
Ural Yekaterinburg	Total		113	13	3	0	0	0	116	13
Ufa	2014–15	Russian Premier League	21	2	2	0	–		23	2
Ufa	2015–16	Russian Premier League	16	1	0	0	–		16	1
Ufa	2016–17	Russian Premier League	7	0	1	0	–		8	0
Ufa	2017–18	Russian Premier League	16	0	1	0	–		17	0
Ufa	2018–19	Russian Premier League	4	0	1	0	4	0	9	0
Ufa	Total		64	3	5	0	4	0	73	3
Alashkert	2018–19	Armenian Premier League	11	1	1	0	–		12	1
Chayka Peschanokopskoye	2019–20	FNL	17	1	1	0	–		18	1
Career total			356	31	15	0	4	0	375	31

== Honours ==
=== Club ===
Alashkert

- Armenian Cup (1): 2018–19
