= Soslan Beriyev =

Russian footballer

Personal information
- Full name: Soslan Khadzhimuratovich Beriyev
- Date of birth: 9 December 1967 (age 58)
- Place of birth: Ordzhonikidze, Russian SFSR
- Height: 1.85 m (6 ft 1 in)
- Position: Forward

Youth career
- Yunost Ordzhonikidze

Senior career*
Years	Team	Apps	(Gls)
1991–1992	FC Spartak Alagir (amateur)		
1992	FC Spartak-2 Vladikavkaz		
1993	FC Iriston Vladikavkaz	35	(8)
1994–1998	FC Avtodor Vladikavkaz	108	(7)
1998	FC Elkhot Elkhotovo		
2001	FC Irbis Mikhaylovskoye		

Managerial career
- 2000: FC Irbis Mikhaylovskoye
- 2010: FC Avtodor Vladikavkaz
- * Club domestic league appearances and goals

Soslan Khadzhimuratovich Beriyev (Russian: Сослан Хаджимуратович Бериев; born 9 December 1967) is a Russian professional football coach and a former player.

== Club career ==
He made his Russian Football National League debut for FC Avtodor Vladikavkaz on 3 April 1994 in a game against FC Zvezda Irkutsk. That was his only season in the FNL.
