= Ivan Živanović (footballer, born 1981) =

Serbian footballer

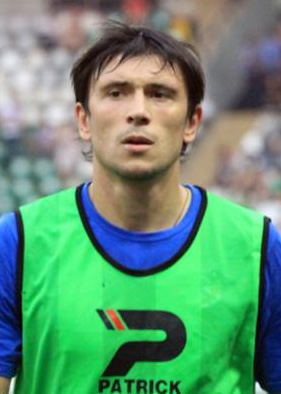

Personal information
- Date of birth: 10 December 1981 (age 44)
- Place of birth: Šabac, SFR Yugoslavia
- Height: 1.87 m (6 ft 1 1/2 in)
- Position: Defender

Senior career*
Years	Team	Apps	(Gls)
1999–2000	Mačva Bogatić	19	(4)
2000–2002	Mačva Šabac	33	(1)
2002–2006	Smederevo	47	(5)
2006–2007	Sampdoria	0	(0)
2008–2011	Rostov	68	(5)
Total		167	(15)
- * Club domestic league appearances and goals

Ivan Živanović (Serbian Cyrillic: Иван Живановић; born 10 December 1981) is a Serbian retired football defender.

Živanović made one appearance in the Coppa Italia while playing for Sampdoria in the 2006–07 season.

== Career statistics ==
Club	Season	League	
Club	Season	Apps	Goals
Smederevo	2002–03	2	0
Smederevo	2003–04	5	0
Smederevo	2004–05	16	0
Smederevo	2005–06	24	5
Smederevo	Total	47	5
