= Anri Khagba =

Russian footballer

Personal information
- Full name: Anri Razanbeyevich Khagba
- Date of birth: 7 January 1992 (age 34)
- Place of birth: Sochi, Russia
- Height: 1.77 m (5 ft 10 in)
- Position: Defender

Senior career*
Years	Team	Apps	(Gls)
2009–2012	FC Rostov	1	(0)
2013–2016	FC Afon New Athos		
2016–2019	Nart Sukhum		

International career
	Abkhazia	17	(0)
- * Club domestic league appearances and goals

Anri Razanbeyevich Khagba (Russian: Анри Разанбеевич Хагба; born 7 January 1992) is a Russian former professional football player.

== Club career ==
He made his Russian Premier League debut for FC Rostov on 12 September 2010 in a game against Anzhi Makhachkala.
