= Aleksandr Samedov =

Russian footballer (born 1984)

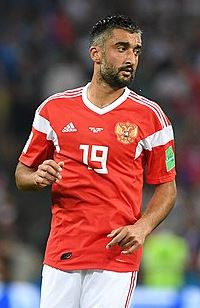
- Samedov playing for Russia at the 2018 FIFA World Cup

Personal information
- Full name: Aleksandr Sergeyevich Samedov
- Date of birth: 19 July 1984 (age 42)
- Place of birth: Moscow, Russian SFSR, Soviet Union
- Height: 1.77 m (5 ft 10 in)
- Position: Winger

Youth career
- 1995–2000: Spartak Moscow

Senior career*
| Years | Team | Apps | (Gls) |
| 2001–2005 | Spartak Moscow | 47 | (6) |
| 2005–2008 | Lokomotiv Moscow | 49 | (3) |
| 2008–2009 | FC Moscow | 43 | (7) |
| 2010–2012 | Dynamo Moscow | 70 | (9) |
| 2012–2016 | Lokomotiv Moscow | 128 | (26) |
| 2017–2018 | Spartak Moscow | 39 | (5) |
| 2019 | Krylia Sovetov Samara | 9 | (0) |
| 2019–2020 | Znamya Noginsk | 18 | (6) |
| Total | | 403 | (62) |

International career
| 2004–2005 | Russia U21 | 12 | (3) |
| 2011–2018 | Russia | 53 | (7) |

Managerial career
- 2021–2022: FC Lokomotiv Moscow (scout)
- 2022–2026: FC Fakel Voronezh (chief scout)
- * Club domestic league appearances and goals

Aleksandr Sergeyevich Samedov (Russian: Александр Сергеевич Самедов, IPA: [ɐlʲɪkˈsandr sʲɪrˈɡʲe(j)ɪvʲɪtɕ sɐˈmʲedəf]; Azerbaijani: Aleksandr Səmədov; born 19 July 1984) is a Russian professional football official and a former player who played as a right winger. He has played for the Russia national football team since 2011 and was selected for the 2014 and 2018 FIFA World Cup.

== Personal life ==
Samedov was born in Moscow, Soviet Union, his father is Azerbaijani and his mother is Russian. He is a Christian and is married to Yuliya.

He named AC Milan as his all-time favorite team in European football and had been a fan since mid-1990s.

== Club career ==
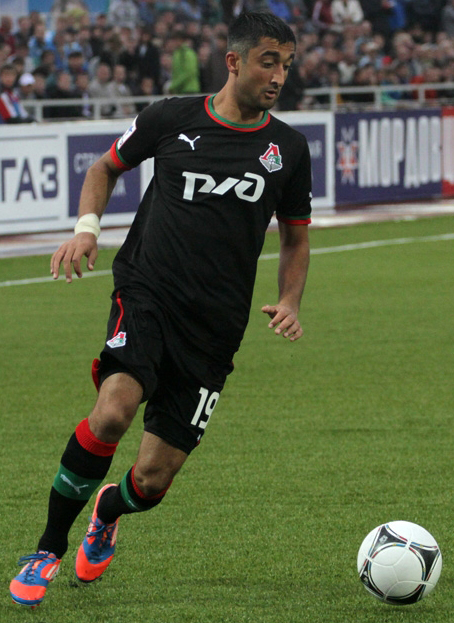
Samedov with Lokomotiv in 2012

He was a student of the Spartak Moscow academy and was considered one of their most talented youngsters. He was a regular in the first team under Nevio Scala but when Aleksandrs Starkovs came he lost his place in the first team. Spartak Moscow then purchased Vladimir Bystrov, and in the summer of 2005 Samedov left for Lokomotiv Moscow for €3.4 million. However, Samedov failed to succeed in Loko, and in 2008 joined FC Moscow. Having shown great progress under direction of Miodrag Božović, he chose to become part of a bigger club and went to Dynamo Moscow during the 2009–10 winter transfer period.

On 27 June 2012, Samedov moved to Lokomotiv, where he played earlier. According to the source close to the club, Lokomotiv paid about 8.2 million € for his services.

During his second spell at Lokomotiv, Samedov established himself as starting XI fixture at right wing. In May 2013, when he added some goals to his usual good amount of assistances, he managed to win monthly poll among Loko fans in the social networks for the best player of the month. He won this poll for the second time in April 2014. After the end of 2013–14 season, club organized new poll among Loko fans in the social networks to name the best player of the season. The award went to Samedov with 32.3 percent of votes.

On 16 January 2017, he returned to FC Spartak Moscow, winning the Russian Premier League title at the end of the season. He was released from his Spartak contract by mutual consent on 5 January 2019. On 13 January 2019, he signed with Krylia Sovetov Samara. On 28 August 2019, he signed with semi-professional side Znamya Noginsk. On 27 October 2019, he retired from football. He restarted his career after Znamya Noginsk was promoted to the third-tier Russian Professional Football League for the 2020–21 season. He retired again in January 2021 and was appointed scout by FC Lokomotiv Moscow. He left Lokomotiv in 2022.

== International career ==
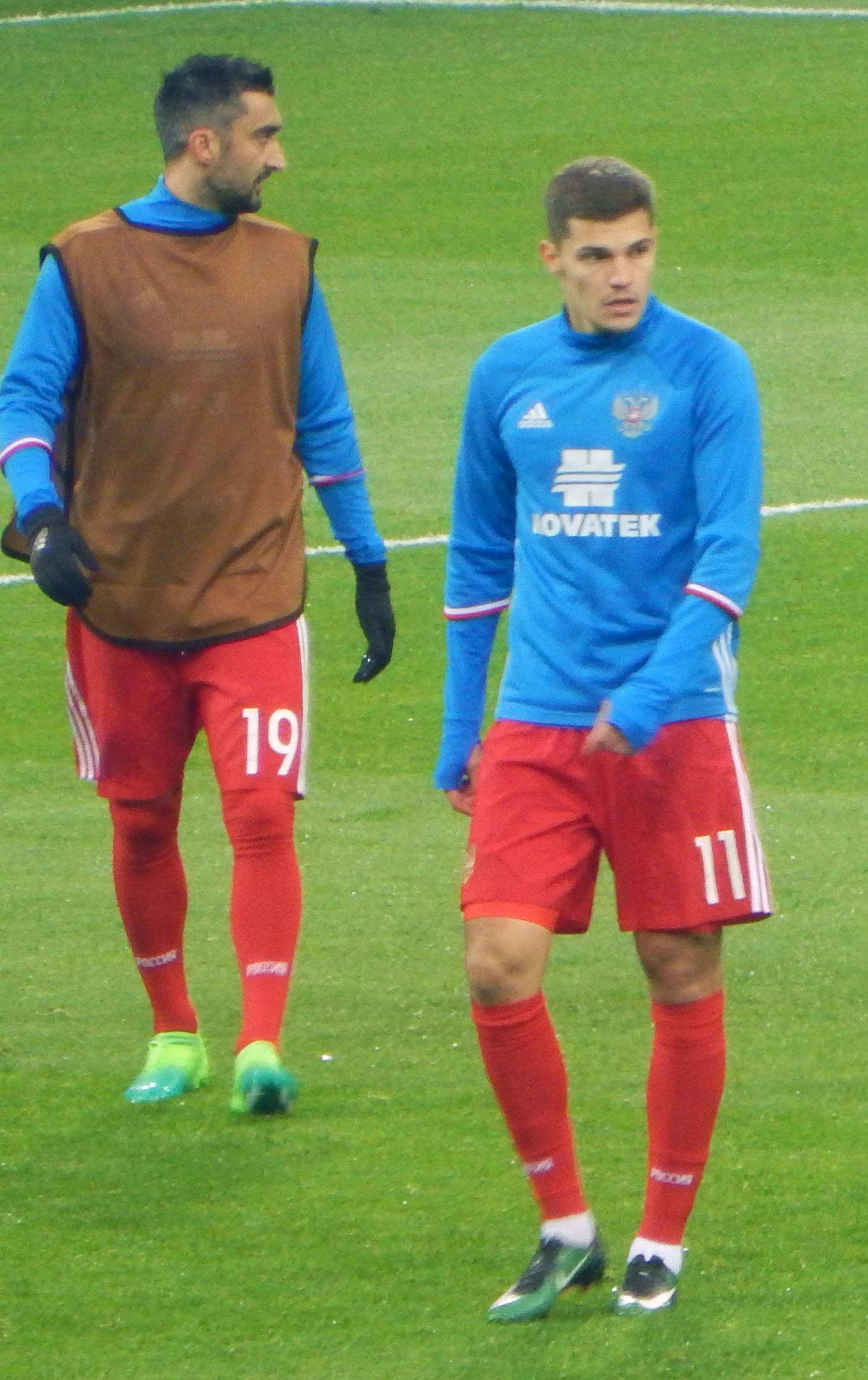
Samedov and Zobnin in Sochi (2017)

In 2003, Samedov first visited Baku to hold discussions on representing the Azerbaijan national football team. He rejected the offer as it would have meant he had to renounce his Russian citizenship in favor of Azerbaijan.

At international level Samedov has played for the Russia U-21s. He was called up to the Russia national football team in late September 2011 for the first time. On 7 October 2011, Samedov made his debut for the senior national team of Russia after coming on as a last-minute substitute for Alan Dzagoev in the 1–0 away win against Slovakia in a Euro 2012 qualifier.

On 2 June 2014, he was included in Russia's 2014 FIFA World Cup squad.

On 11 May 2018, he was included in Russia's extended 2018 FIFA World Cup squad. On 3 June 2018, he was included in the finalized World Cup squad. He started Russia's every game in the World Cup, but was substituted in the second half in 3 out of 5, including both knock-out stage games. Following Russia's 2018 FIFA World Cup quarterfinal loss to Croatia, he announced his retirement from the national team.

== Career statistics ==
=== Club statistics ===
As of 13 December 2018

| Club | Season | League | | | Cup | | Continental | | Other | | Total | |
| Club | Season | Division | Apps | Goals | Apps | Goals | Apps | Goals | Apps | Goals | Apps | Goals |
|---|---|---|---|---|---|---|---|---|---|---|---|---|
| Spartak Moscow | 2001 | Russian Premier League | 0 | 0 | 0 | 0 | 0 | 0 | – | | 0 | 0 |
| Spartak Moscow | 2002 | Russian Premier League | 1 | 0 | 0 | 0 | 0 | 0 | – | | 1 | 0 |
| Spartak Moscow | 2003 | Russian Premier League | 6 | 0 | 1 | 0 | 0 | 0 | 4 (Note: Appearance(s) in the Russian Premier League Cup) | 0 | 11 | 0 |
| Spartak Moscow | 2004 | Russian Premier League | 29 | 6 | 1 | 0 | 7 | 2 | 1 (Note: Appearance in the Russian Super Cup) | 0 | 38 | 8 |
| Spartak Moscow | 2005 | Russian Premier League | 11 | 0 | 2 | 1 | – | | – | | 13 | 1 |
| Lokomotiv Moscow | 2005 | Russian Premier League | 9 | 0 | 0 | 0 | 6 | 1 | – | | 15 | 1 |
| Lokomotiv Moscow | 2006 | Russian Premier League | 13 | 0 | 1 | 0 | 2 | 0 | – | | 16 | 0 |
| Lokomotiv Moscow | 2007 | Russian Premier League | 23 | 3 | 4 | 0 | 6 | 1 | – | | 33 | 4 |
| Lokomotiv Moscow | 2008 | Russian Premier League | 4 | 0 | – | | – | | – | | 4 | 0 |
| FC Moscow | 2008 | Russian Premier League | 16 | 2 | 2 | 0 | 4 | 2 | – | | 22 | 4 |
| FC Moscow | 2009 | Russian Premier League | 27 | 5 | 3 | 0 | – | | – | | 30 | 5 |
| FC Moscow | Total | | 43 | 7 | 5 | 0 | 4 | 2 | 0 | 0 | 52 | 9 |
| Dynamo Moscow | 2010 | Russian Premier League | 27 | 3 | 2 | 1 | – | | – | | 29 | 4 |
| Dynamo Moscow | 2011–12 | Russian Premier League | 43 | 6 | 6 | 0 | – | | – | | 49 | 6 |
| Dynamo Moscow | Total | | 70 | 9 | 8 | 1 | 0 | 0 | 0 | 0 | 78 | 10 |
| Lokomotiv Moscow | 2012–13 | Russian Premier League | 26 | 2 | 1 | 0 | – | | – | | 27 | 2 |
| Lokomotiv Moscow | 2013–14 | Russian Premier League | 30 | 7 | 0 | 0 | – | | – | | 30 | 7 |
| Lokomotiv Moscow | 2014–15 | Russian Premier League | 29 | 4 | 5 | 0 | 2 | 0 | – | | 36 | 4 |
| Lokomotiv Moscow | 2015–16 | Russian Premier League | 28 | 9 | 0 | 0 | 8 | 5 | 1 | 0 | 37 | 14 |
| Lokomotiv Moscow | 2016–17 | Russian Premier League | 15 | 4 | 2 | 1 | – | | – | | 17 | 5 |
| Lokomotiv Moscow | Total (2 spells) | | 177 | 29 | 13 | 1 | 24 | 7 | 1 | 0 | 215 | 37 |
| Spartak Moscow | 2016–17 | Russian Premier League | 10 | 3 | – | | – | | – | | 10 | 3 |
| Spartak Moscow | 2017–18 | Russian Premier League | 21 | 2 | 3 | 0 | 4 | 1 | 0 | 0 | 28 | 3 |
| Spartak Moscow | 2018–19 | Russian Premier League | 8 | 0 | 1 | 0 | 3 | 0 | – | | 12 | 0 |
| Spartak Moscow | Total (2 spells) | | 86 | 11 | 8 | 1 | 14 | 3 | 5 | 0 | 113 | 15 |
| Career total | | | 376 | 56 | 34 | 3 | 42 | 12 | 6 | 0 | 458 | 71 |

=== International ===
Statistics accurate as of match played 7 July 2018.

Russia
| Year | Apps | Goals |
|---|---|---|
| 2011 | 2 | 0 |
| 2012 | 4 | 0 |
| 2013 | 7 | 3 |
| 2014 | 11 | 0 |
| 2015 | 2 | 0 |
| 2016 | 9 | 2 |
| 2017 | 9 | 1 |
| 2018 | 9 | 1 |
| Total | 53 | 7 |

=== International goals ===
As of 5 January 2021 (Russia score listed first, score column indicates score after each Samedov goal)

| # | Date | Venue | Opponent | Score | Result | Competition |
|---|---|---|---|---|---|---|
| 1. | 6 September 2013 | Central Stadium, Kazan, Russia | Luxembourg | 4–1 | 4–1 | 2014 FIFA World Cup qualification |
| 2. | 11 October 2013 | Stade Josy Barthel, Luxembourg City, Luxembourg | Luxembourg | 1–0 | 4–0 | 2014 FIFA World Cup qualification |
| 3. | 15 November 2013 | Zayed Sports City Stadium, Abu Dhabi, United Arab Emirates | Serbia | 1–0 | 1–1 | Friendly |
| 4. | 9 October 2016 | Krasnodar Stadium, Krasnodar, Russia | Costa Rica | 1–2 | 3–4 | Friendly |
| 5. | 10 November 2016 | Jassim Bin Hamad Stadium, Doha, Qatar | Qatar | 1–0 | 1–2 | Friendly |
| 6. | 24 June 2017 | Kazan Arena, Kazan, Russia | Mexico | 1–0 | 1–2 | 2017 FIFA Confederations Cup |
| 7. | 5 June 2018 | VEB Arena, Moscow, Russia | Turkey | 1–0 | 1–1 | Friendly |

== Honours ==
=== Clubs ===
Lokomotiv Moscow

- Russian Cup: 2006–07, 2014–15, 2016–17

Spartak Moscow

- Russian Premier League: 2016–17
- Russian Super Cup: 2017
