= Viktor Chakrygin =

Russian footballer (1984–2022)

Personal information
- Full name: Viktor Nikolayevich Chakrygin
- Date of birth: 25 January 1984
- Date of death: 9 January 2022 (aged 37)
- Height: 1.90 m (6 ft 3 in)
- Position: Goalkeeper

Youth career
- DYuSSh Smena-Zenit

Senior career*
Years	Team	Apps	(Gls)
2001–2002	Dynamo Makhachkala	6	(0)
2003	FC PetroLesPort Saint Petersburg		
2005	FC Kolpino-INKON Kolpino		
2005–2006	Dynamo Makhachkala	2	(0)
2007	Zenit Penza	22	(0)
2008–2009	Anzhi Makhachkala	6	(0)
2010	FC Turbostroitel Saint Petersburg		
2010	Rusichi Oryol	4	(0)
2011	FC Nevsky Front Saint Petersburg		
- * Club domestic league appearances and goals

Viktor Nikolayevich Chakrygin (Russian: Виктор Николаевич Чакрыгин; 25 January 1984 – 9 January 2022) was a Russian professional footballer who played as a goalkeeper.

== Club career ==
Chakrygin made his Russian Football National League debut for FC Dynamo Makhachkala on 6 November 2005 in a game against FC Chkalovets-1936 Novosibirsk. He played two more seasons in the FNL for Dynamo and FC Anzhi Makhachkala.

== Death ==
He died on 9 January 2022, at the age of 37, 16 days before his 38th birthday. No cause of death was reported at the time.
