= Dmitri Sokolov (footballer) =

Russian footballer

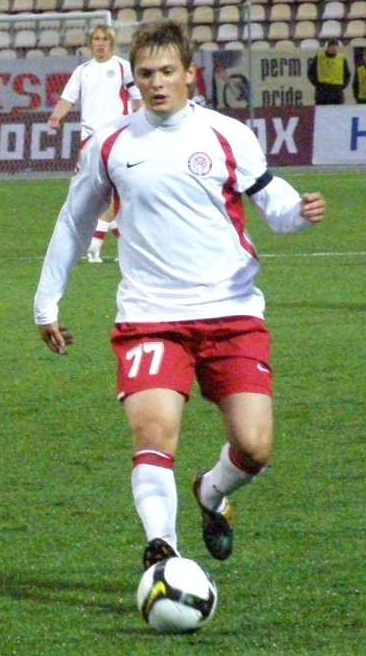

Personal information
- Full name: Dmitri Olegovich Sokolov
- Date of birth: 1 March 1988 (age 38)
- Place of birth: Strezhevoy, Russian SFSR
- Height: 1.81 m (5 ft 11 in)
- Positions: Left wing back; left midfielder

Senior career*
Years	Team	Apps	(Gls)
2004–2008	FC Torpedo Moscow	75	(6)
2009–2010	FC Amkar Perm	18	(1)
2011	FC Sokol Saratov	12	(0)
2011–2012	FC Khimki	9	(1)
2012–2013	FC Sokol Saratov	25	(10)
2013–2014	FC Fakel Voronezh	36	(4)
2015	FC Vybor-Kurbatovo Voronezh	0	(0)
2015	FC Khimik Dzerzhinsk	5	(1)
2015–2017	FC Torpedo Moscow	45	(6)
2017	FC Tom Tomsk	2	(0)

International career
2005	Russia U-17	3	(0)
2007	Russia U-19	6	(1)
- * Club domestic league appearances and goals

Dmitri Olegovich Sokolov (Russian: Дмитрий Олегович Соколов; born 1 March 1988) is a Russian former professional footballer.
