= Vitaly Marakhovsky =

Russian footballer

Personal information
- Full name: Vitaly Sergeyevich Marakhovsky
- Date of birth: 14 January 1988 (age 38)
- Place of birth: Armavir, Krasnodar Krai, Russian SFSR
- Height: 1.81 m (5 ft 11 in)
- Position: Defender

Youth career
- 2005–2007: Lokomotiv Moscow

Senior career*
Years	Team	Apps	(Gls)
2005–2009	Lokomotiv Moscow	0	(0)
2006	→ SKA Rostov-on-Don (loan)	9	(1)
2007	→ SOYUZ-Gazprom Izhevsk (loan)	13	(1)
2008	→ Zvezda Irkutsk (loan)	22	(0)
2009	→ Torpedo Armavir (loan)	25	(4)
2010	Dinamo Minsk	11	(0)
2011	Dynamo Bryansk	6	(0)
2012	Lokomotiv-2 Moscow	8	(2)
2012–2013	Tekstilshchik Ivanovo	12	(0)
2013	Biolog-Novokubansk Progress	21	(0)
2014	Vityaz Krymsk	9	(3)
2014	Avangard Kursk	16	(0)
2015	Slutsk	8	(1)
2015–2016	Vitebsk	30	(2)
2017	Naftan Novopolotsk	9	(1)
2017	Belshina Bobruisk	5	(0)
2018	FC Aromat Otradnoye		
- * Club domestic league appearances and goals

Vitaly Sergeyevich Marakhovsky (Russian: Виталий Сергеевич Мараховский; born 14 January 1988) is a Russian former professional football player.

== Club career ==
He made his Russian Football National League debut for FC Zvezda Irkutsk on 27 March 2008 in a game against FC Anzhi Makhachkala.
