= Pavel Pechyonkin =

Russian footballer

Personal information
- Full name: Pavel Leonidovich Pechyonkin
- Date of birth: 30 January 1991 (age 35)
- Place of birth: Sukhoy Log, Russian SFSR
- Height: 1.78 m (5 ft 10 in)
- Position: Midfielder

Youth career
- FC Spartak Moscow
- FC Lokomotiv Moscow

Senior career*
Years	Team	Apps	(Gls)
2009	FC Lokomotiv Moscow	0	(0)
2011–2012	FC Ural Yekaterinburg	5	(0)
2014	FC Oktan Perm	9	(0)
2014–2015	FC Nosta Novotroitsk	12	(0)
2015	FC Lada-Togliatti	2	(0)
- * Club domestic league appearances and goals

Pavel Leonidovich Pechyonkin (Russian: Павел Леонидович Печёнкин; born 30 January 1991) is a former Russian football midfielder.

== Club career ==
He made his Russian Football National League debut for FC Ural Yekaterinburg on 4 June 2011 in a game against FC Yenisey Krasnoyarsk. That was his only season in the FNL.
