= Aleksandr Tumasyan (football manager) =

Soviet and Russian football manager

Personal information
- Full name: Aleksandr Sergeyevich Tumasyan
- Date of birth: 9 February 1955 (age 71)

Managerial career
- Years: Team
- 1991: SKA Rostov-on-Don (assistant)
- 1992: SKA Rostov-on-Don
- 1993: Torpedo Taganrog (assistant)
- 1996: SKA Rostov-on-Don
- 1997: SKA Rostov-on-Don (assistant)
- 1998–2004: SKA Rostov-on-Don
- 2003–2004: SKA Rostov-on-Don (VP)
- 2006: Dynamo Stavropol
- 2007–2008: Rakuunat
- 2010: FC Rostov (reserves)
- 2015: FC Sochi

Aleksandr Sergeyevich Tumasyan (Russian: Александр Сергеевич Тумасян; born 9 February 1955) is a Soviet and Russian professional football coach.

His sons Denis Tumasyan, Sergei Tumasyan and Aleksandr Tumasyan are professional footballers.

Ростовскому тренеру Александру Тумасяну исполнилось 60 лет (2015 год)
