= Azamat Merov =

Russian footballer

Personal information
- Full name: Azamat Ruslanovich Merov
- Date of birth: 5 February 1989 (age 37)
- Height: 1.78 m (5 ft 10 in)
- Position: Midfielder

Senior career*
Years	Team	Apps	(Gls)
2010	PFC Spartak Nalchik	0	(0)
2011–2013	FC Angusht Nazran	56	(0)
2014–2015	FC Stroitel Russkoye		
- * Club domestic league appearances and goals

Azamat Ruslanovich Merov (Russian: Азамат Русланович Меров; born 5 February 1989) is a former Russian football midfielder.

== Club career ==
He played in the Russian Football National League for FC Angusht Nazran in 2013.
