= Aleksandr Tumasyan (footballer) =

Armenian footballer

Personal information
- Full name: Aleksandr Aleksandrovich Tumasyan
- Date of birth: 15 October 1992 (age 34)
- Place of birth: Rostov-on-Don, Russia
- Height: 1.80 m (5 ft 11 in)
- Position: Midfielder

Senior career*
Years	Team	Apps	(Gls)
2013–2014	Jaro	24	(0)
2014	→ JBK (loan)	2	(0)
2015	TP-47	7	(1)
2017	FCI	10	(0)

International career
2014	Armenia	2	(0)
- * Club domestic league appearances and goals

Aleksandr Aleksandrovich Tumasyan (Russian: Александр Александрович Тумасян; born 15 October 1992) is an Armenian former football player who played as a midfielder.

== International career ==
Tumasyan played his first international game with the national team on 31 May 2014, in a friendly against Algeria where he came in as a substitute for Artur Yuspashyan after 73 minutes.

== Personal ==
His father is Aleksandr Tumasyan and his older brothers are Denis Tumasyan and Sergei Tumasyan.
