= Andriy Proshyn =

Ukrainian footballer

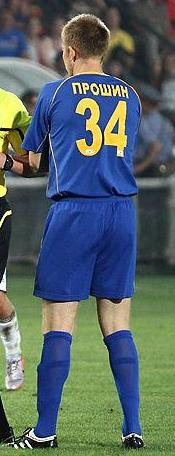

Personal information
- Full name: Andriy Volodymyrovych Proshyn
- Date of birth: 19 February 1985 (age 41)
- Place of birth: Bor, Russian SFSR, USSR
- Height: 1.89 m (6 ft 2 in)
- Positions: Defender; midfielder

Team information
- Current team: FC Volna Nizhny Novgorod Oblast (manager)

Youth career
- Sormovich Nizhny Novgorod
- Spartak Moscow
- FC Dynamo Kyiv

Senior career*
Years	Team	Apps	(Gls)
2001–2004	FC Dynamo Kyiv	0	(0)
2001–2002	→ FC Borysfen-2 Boryspil (loan)	11	(2)
2002–2004	→ FC Dynamo-2 Kyiv	52	(1)
2002	→ FC Dynamo-3 Kyiv	2	(0)
2005	FC Khimki	20	(0)
2006–2007	FC Tom Tomsk	12	(0)
2008–2009	FC Alania Vladikavkaz	48	(1)
2010–2011	FC Rostov	7	(0)
2012	FC Sibir Novosibirsk	0	(0)
2012–2013	FC Dolgoprudny	17	(1)
2013–2014	FC Khimik Dzerzhinsk	26	(1)
2014–2016	FC Volga Nizhny Novgorod	48	(0)
2016–2018	FSK Dolgoprudny	39	(2)

International career
2003–2005	Ukraine U21	6	(0)

Managerial career
- 2018–2020: FSK Dolgoprudny (assistant)
- 2020–2022: FC Olimp-Dolgoprudny-2
- 2022–2025: FC Kosmos Dolgoprudny
- 2025–: FC Volna Nizhny Novgorod Oblast
Medal record
Men's football
Representing Ukraine
UEFA European Under-19 Championship
Bronze medal – third place	2004 Switzerland
- * Club domestic league appearances and goals

Andriy Volodymyrovych Proshyn (or Andrei Vladimirovich Proshin) (Russian: Андрей Владимирович Прошин; born 19 February 1985) is a Ukrainian professional football coach and a former player. He is the manager of FC Volna Nizhny Novgorod Oblast. He also holds Russian citizenship.

== Club career ==
He made his debut in the Russian Premier League in 2006 for FC Tom Tomsk.

== See also ==
- 2005 FIFA World Youth Championship squads#Ukraine
