= Constantin Iavorschi =

Moldovan footballer

Personal information
- Full name: Constantin Iavorschi
- Date of birth: 16 March 1990 (age 36)
- Place of birth: Chișinău, Moldovan SSR
- Height: 1.78 m (5 ft 10 in)
- Position: Forward

Team information
- Current team: Spicul Chișcăreni

Youth career
- Lokomotiv Moscow

Senior career*
Years	Team	Apps	(Gls)
2010	Rostov	0	(0)
2011–2012	Iskra-Stal Rîbniţa	17	(9)
2012–2013	Zimbru Chișinău	13	(3)
2013–2015	FC Milsami	51	(12)
2017–	Spicul Chișcăreni	28	(2)

International career^{‡}
2011–2012	Moldova-21	5	(0)
- * Club domestic league appearances and goals ‡ National team caps and goals as of 4 June 2019

Constantin Iavorschi is a Moldovan football player who currently is playing for FC Spicul Chișcăreni in Moldovan National Division.
