= Roman Panin (footballer) =

Russian footballer

Personal information
- Full name: Roman Petrovich Panin
- Date of birth: 17 February 1989 (age 37)
- Place of birth: Tula, Russia
- Height: 1.83 m (6 ft 0 in)
- Position: Striker

Youth career
- 1998–: FC Arsenal Tula

Senior career*
Years	Team	Apps	(Gls)
2007–2010	FC Dynamo Moscow	0	(0)
2010	→ FC Irtysh Omsk (loan)	25	(1)
2011–2012	FC Arsenal Tula (D4)		
2012–2013	FC Arsenal-2 Tula (D4)		
2013	FC Aleksin		

International career
2006	Russia U-17	8	(5)
2008	Russia U-19	10	(3)
- * Club domestic league appearances and goals

Roman Petrovich Panin (Russian: Роман Петрович Панин; born 17 February 1989) is a former Russian professional football player.

== Club career ==
He made his Russian Football National League debut for FC Irtysh Omsk on 27 March 2010 in a game against FC Nizhny Novgorod.
