= Sergei Tumasyan =

Russian footballer

Personal information
- Full name: Sergei Aleksandrovich Tumasyan
- Date of birth: 31 January 1990 (age 36)
- Place of birth: Rostov-on-Don, Russian SFSR
- Height: 1.77 m (5 ft 10 in)
- Position: Midfielder

Youth career
- –2005: SDYuSShOR-8 Viktor Ponedelnik Rostov-on-Don
- 2005–2007: RO UOR Rostov-on-Don

Senior career*
Years	Team	Apps	(Gls)
2008	Rakuunat		(1)
2009	FC KooTeePee		
2009	FC SKA Rostov-on-Don	8	(0)
2010	FC Rostov	2	(0)
2014	Gandzasar	3	(1)
2014–2015	FC Sochi	23	(5)
2015–2017	FCI Tallinn	46	(8)
2018	Nõmme Kalju	8	(3)
2018	FC Sibir Novosibirsk	3	(0)
2019	Metallurg Bekabad	19	(1)
2021–2022	North Bangkok University	16	(7)
2022–2023	DP Kanchanaburi	28	(15)
- * Club domestic league appearances and goals

Sergei Aleksandrovich Tumasyan (Russian: Серге́й Александрович Тумасян; born 31 January 1990) is a Russian former professional footballer who played as a midfielder.

== Career ==
Tumasyan made his professional debut for FC Rostov on 13 July 2010 in the Russian Cup game against FC Salyut Belgorod.

Tumasyan joined Metallurg Bekabad in Uzbekistan for the 2019 season.

== Personal life ==
He is the older brother of Aleksandr Tumasyan, younger brother of Denis Tumasyan and a son of Aleksandr Tumasyan.

== Honours ==
Dragon Pathumwan Kanchanaburi

- Thai League 3 Western Region: 2022–23
