= Dejan Radić (footballer) =

Serbian footballer

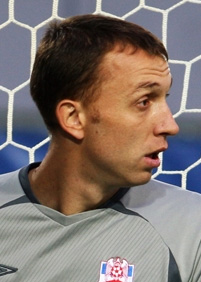
- Radić with Spartak Nalchik in 2009

Personal information
- Full name: Dejan Radić
- Date of birth: 8 July 1980 (age 46)
- Place of birth: Belgrade, SFR Yugoslavia
- Height: 1.86 m (6 ft 1 in)
- Position: Goalkeeper

Senior career*
Years	Team	Apps	(Gls)
1999–2003	Rad	67+	(0+)
2004–2005	Alania Vladikavkaz	38	(0)
2007–2009	Spartak Nalchik	43	(0)
2010–2011	Rostov	13	(0)
Total		161+	(0+)

International career
2000	FR Yugoslavia U21	1	(0)
- * Club domestic league appearances and goals

Dejan Radić (Serbian Cyrillic: Дејан Радић; born 8 July 1980) is a Serbian retired footballer who played as a goalkeeper.

== Club career ==
From 1999 to 2003, Radić played for Rad in the First League of Serbia and Montenegro, before the club suffered relegation to the Second League. He later moved abroad to Russia and joined Alania Vladikavkaz in early 2004. In his two seasons at the club, Radić made 38 league appearances in the top flight, before the side got relegated at the end of the 2005 season. He later signed with fellow Russian club Spartak Nalchik, spending three seasons (2007–2009) and making 43 league appearances. In January 2010, Radić was acquired by Rostov.

=== Career-ending injury ===
On 23 April 2011, during a Russian Premier League game between Rostov and Terek Grozny, Radić collided with Zaur Sadayev while fighting for a high ball. As a result, Radić had to be rushed to the hospital and had to undergo nephrectomy after his kidney was found to be seriously damaged. Following the incident, Rostov announced that Radić would continue to receive all the bonuses during the time of his recovery. However, despite Rostov's initial promises, Radić stopped being paid by the club and did not receive any money stipulated in his contract between June 2011 and March 2012. Meanwhile, it was reported that Terek president Ramzan Kadyrov gave Radić $50,000 as a goodwill gesture.

== International career ==
In December 2000, Radić earned one cap for FR Yugoslavia at under-21 level, coming on as a substitute for Zoran Vasković in a 2–1 friendly win away against Greece.
