= Goran Drmić =

Bosnia and Herzegovina footballer

Personal information
- Date of birth: 4 January 1988 (age 38)
- Place of birth: Zenica, SFR Yugoslavia
- Height: 1.82 m (5 ft 11 1/2 in)
- Position: Defender

Senior career*
Years	Team	Apps	(Gls)
2006–2007	NK Zagreb	2	(0)
2007–2008	Istra Pula	10	(0)
2008–2009	Karlovac	6	(0)
2009	FC Moscow	0	(0)
2009	→ Volgar-Gazprom (loan)	7	(0)
2010	Krylia Sovetov	10	(0)
- * Club domestic league appearances and goals

Goran Drmić (born 4 January 1988) is a Bosnian-Herzegovinian former professional footballer.
