= Soslan Dzhioyev (footballer, born 1989) =

Russian professional footballer

Personal information
- Full name: Soslan Tamerlanovich Dzhioyev
- Date of birth: 25 February 1989 (age 37)
- Place of birth: Ordzhonikidze, Russian SFSR
- Height: 1.71 m (5 ft 7 in)
- Position: Midfielder

Youth career
- FC Spartak Moscow

Senior career*
Years	Team	Apps	(Gls)
2005–2006	FC Spartak Moscow	0	(0)
2006–2007	FC Spartak-Youth Moscow		
2008–2010	FC Alania Vladikavkaz	7	(0)
2010	→ FC Neftekhimik Nizhnekamsk (loan)	5	(0)
2011	FC Druzhba Maykop	7	(0)
2012	FK REO Vilnius	17	(3)
2013	FC Dnepr Smolensk	14	(1)
2014	FC Prialit Reutov		
2015–2016	FC Alania Vladikavkaz	16	(1)
2016	FC Digora (amateur)		
2016	FC Chayka Peschanokopskoye	4	(0)
2017	FC Stroitel Russkoye		
2017–2018	FC Omega Kurganinsk		
2018	FC Spartak Budyonnovsk		
- * Club domestic league appearances and goals

Soslan Tamerlanovich Dzhioyev (Russian: Сослан Тамерланович Джиоев; born 25 February 1989) is a Russian former professional footballer.

== Club career ==
He played in the Russian Football National League for FC Alania Vladikavkaz in 2008.
