= Soslan Dzhioyev (footballer, born 1993) =

Footballer

Personal information
- Full name: Soslan Vyacheslavovich Dzhioyev
- Date of birth: 8 August 1993 (age 33)
- Place of birth: Tskhinvali, Georgia
- Height: 1.82 m (6 ft 0 in)
- Positions: Midfielder; forward

Youth career
- FC FAYUR Beslan
- FC Lokomotiv Moscow

Senior career*
Years	Team	Apps	(Gls)
2010–2011	FC Lokomotiv Moscow	0	(0)
2011–2012	FC Alania Vladikavkaz	10	(0)
2013	FC Alania-d Vladikavkaz	10	(1)
2013	FC Alania Vladikavkaz	1	(0)
2014	FC Alania-d Vladikavkaz	5	(6)
2014–2016	FC Alania Vladikavkaz	34	(4)
- * Club domestic league appearances and goals

Soslan Vyacheslavovich Dzhioyev (Russian: Сослан Вячеславович Джиоев; born 8 August 1993) is a former Russian football player.

== Club career ==
He made his debut in the Russian Football National League for FC Alania Vladikavkaz on 9 August 2011 in a game against FC Torpedo Vladimir.
