= 2011–12 FC Rostov season =

Football team season

Rostov
2011–12 season
- Chairman: Oleg Lopatin
- Manager: Oleh Protasov (until 13 May 2011); Volodymyr Lyutyi caretaker (13 May - 20 June 2011); Andrei Talalayev caretaker (20 June - 1 July 2011); Sergei Balakhnin (1 July 2011 – 18 April 2012); Anatoli Baidachny (18 April 2012 - )
- Stadium: Olimp - 2, Rostov
- Russian Premier League: 13th Won relegation Playoff
- 2010–11 Russian Cup: Semi-finals vs Alania Vladikavkaz
- 2011–12 Russian Cup: Semifinals vs Rubin Kazan
- Top goalscorer: League: Roman Adamov (11); All: Roman Adamov (13)
| Home colours | Away colours |

The 2011–12 Rostov season was the 3rd straight season that the club played in the Russian Premier League, the highest tier of football in Russia. They finished the season in 13th place, meaning they had to win a Relegation Playoff against Shinnik Yaroslavl, which they won 4–0 on aggregate. Rostov also competed in the 2010–11 & 2011–12 Russian Cup reaching the semi-finals in both.

Rostov started the season with Oleh Protasov as manager, but he was sacked as manager on 13 May 2011, being replaced by Volodymyr Lyutyi in a caretaker capacity. Lyutyi himself was sacked as caretaker on 20 June 2011, being replaced by Andrei Talalayev, also as caretaker. On 1 July Sergei Balakhnin was appointed as Protasov's permanent successor, but was replaced as manager on 18 April 2012 by Anatoli Baidachny.

== Squad ==
As of match played 22 May 2012

| No. | Name | Nationality | Position | Date of birth (age) | Signed from | Signed in | Contract ends | Apps. | Goals |
Goalkeepers
| 12 | Ilya Madilov | (Russia) | GK | 18 June 1988 (aged 23) | Istra | 2011 | | 0 | 0 |
| 21 | Stipe Pletikosa | (Croatia) | GK | 8 January 1979 (aged 33) | Spartak Moscow | 2011 | | 25 | 0 |
| 22 | Dejan Radić | (Serbia) | GK | 8 July 1980 (aged 31) | Spartak Nalchik | 2010 | | 16 | 0 |
| 41 | Artyom Orsayev | (Russia) | GK | 20 September 1993 (aged 18) | Youth team | 2011 | | 0 | 0 |
| 62 | Vladislav Suslov | (Russia) | GK | 13 November 1995 (aged 16) | Youth team | 2011 | | 0 | 0 |
| 97 | Sergei Pesyakov | (Russia) | GK | 9 August 1993 (aged 18) | loan from Spartak Moscow | 2012 | 2012 | 2 | 0 |
Defenders
| 3 | Kornel Saláta | (Slovakia) | DF | 24 January 1985 (aged 27) | Slovan Bratislava | 2011 | | 45 | 3 |
| 4 | Isaac Okoronkwo | (Nigeria) | DF | 1 May 1978 (aged 34) | Moscow | 2010 | | 60 | 0 |
| 15 | Ivan Živanović | (Serbia) | DF | 10 December 1981 (aged 30) | Sampdoria | 2008 | | | |
| 16 | Dmitri Kruglov | (Estonia) | DF | 24 May 1984 (aged 27) | Inter Baku | 2011 | | 22 | 1 |
| 24 | Denis Kolodin | (Russia) | DF | 11 January 1982 (aged 30) | loan from Dynamo Moscow | 2012 | 2012 | 11 | 0 |
| 28 | Igor Smolnikov | (Russia) | DF | 8 August 1988 (aged 23) | loan from Lokomotiv Moscow | 2011 | 2012 | 28 | 1 |
| 72 | Valentin Filatov | (Russia) | DF | 19 March 1982 (aged 30) | Spartak Nalchik | 2011 | | 12 | 0 |
| 89 | Vitali Dyakov | (Russia) | DF | 31 January 1989 (aged 23) | Lokomotiv Moscow | 2012 | | 6 | 0 |
Midfielders
| 2 | Timofei Kalachev | (Belarus) | MF | 1 May 1981 (aged 31) | Krylia Sovetov | 2010 | | | |
| 6 | Oscar Ahumada | (Argentina) | MF | 31 August 1982 (aged 29) | Veracruz | 2011 | | 3 | 0 |
| 7 | Élson | (Brazil) | MF | 16 November 1981 (aged 30) | VfB Stuttgart | 2011 | | 17 | 0 |
| 11 | Dragan Blatnjak | (Bosnia and Herzegovina) | MF | 1 August 1981 (aged 30) | Khimki | 2010 | | 48 | 2 |
| 47 | Khoren Bayramyan | (Russia) (Note: Khoren Bayramyan was born in Koti, Armenia, but qualified to represent Russia, representing Russia U18 in 2010. Bayramyan would later go on to represent Armenia in 2020.) | MF | 26 May 1992 (aged 19) | Youth Team | 2010 | | 20 | 0 |
| 81 | Răzvan Cociș | (Romania) | MF | 19 February 1983 (aged 29) | Al-Nassr | 2011 | | 29 | 4 |
| 84 | Alexandru Gațcan | (Moldova) | MF | 27 March 1984 (aged 28) | Rubin Kazan | 2008 | | | |
| 88 | Edgaras Česnauskis | (Lithuania) | MF | 5 February 1984 (aged 28) | Dynamo Moscow | 2011 | | 28 | 0 |
| 92 | Roman Yemelyanov | (Russia) | MF | 8 May 1992 (aged 20) | loan from Shakhtar Donetsk | 2011 | | 19 | 0 |
Forwards
| 9 | Roman Adamov | (Russia) | FW | 21 June 1982 (aged 29) | loan from Rubin Kazan | 2010 | | | |
| 10 | Dmitri Kirichenko | (Russia) | FW | 17 January 1977 (aged 35) | Saturn Ramenskoye | 2011 | | 24 | 2 |
| 18 | Michal Papadopulos | (Czech Republic) | FW | 14 April 1985 (aged 27) | Zhemchuzhina-Sochi | 2011 | | 11 | 1 |
| 19 | Héctor Bracamonte | (Argentina) | FW | 16 February 1978 (aged 34) | Terek Grozny | 2011 | | 28 | 7 |
| 23 | Dmitry Poloz | (Russia) | FW | 12 July 1991 (aged 20) | Lokomotiv Moscow | 2012 | | 10 | 0 |
Out on loan
| 49 | Nikita Vasilyev | (Russia) | MF | 22 March 1992 (aged 20) | Spartak Moscow | 2010 | | 0 | 0 |
Left during the season
| 5 | Aleksandr Khokhlov | (Russia) | DF | 30 September 1988 (aged 23) | Zenit St.Petersburg | 2011 | | 10 | 0 |
| 8 | Chavdar Yankov | (Bulgaria) | MF | 29 March 1984 (aged 28) | loan from Metalurh Donetsk | 2010 | | 29 | 2 |
| 13 | Aleksei Rebko | (Russia) | MF | 6 July 1990 (aged 21) | Dynamo Moscow | 2011 | | 15 | 0 |
| 14 | Anri Khagush | (Russia) | DF | 23 September 1986 (aged 25) | loan from Rubin Kazan | 2010 | | 49 | 3 |
| 17 | Maksim Grigoryev | (Russia) | FW | 6 July 1990 (aged 21) | loan from MITOS Novocherkassk | 2011 | | 33 | 6 |
| 20 | Anis Boussaïdi | (Tunisia) | DF | 10 April 1981 (aged 31) | PAOK | 2011 | | 18 | 0 |
| 30 | Anton Kochenkov | (Russia) | GK | 2 April 1987 (aged 25) | loan from Volga Nizhny Novgorod | 2011 | | 20 | 0 |
| 33 | Dmitri Malyaka | (Russia) | MF | 15 January 1990 (aged 22) | loan from MITOS Novocherkassk | 2011 | | 4 | 0 |
| 77 | Andriy Proshyn | (Ukraine) (Note: Andriy Proshyn was born in Bor, Russia, but qualified to represent Ukraine, representing Ukraine U21 in 2003.) | DF | 19 February 1985 (aged 27) | Alania Vladikavkaz | 2010 | | 9 | 0 |
| 90 | Artyom Kulesha | (Russia) | MF | 14 January 1990 (aged 22) | loan from Rubin Kazan | 2011 | | 3 | 0 |
| 99 | Oleg Ivanov | (Russia) | MF | 30 September 1988 (aged 23) | Krylia Sovetov | 2011 | | 17 | 1 |

=== Reserve squad ===
Note: Flags indicate national team as defined under FIFA eligibility rules; some limited exceptions apply. Players may hold more than one non-FIFA nationality.

| No. | Pos. | Nation | Player |
|---|---|---|---|
| 27 | DF | RUS | Sergei Kharlamov |
| 29 | MF | RUS | Andrei Vasilyev |
| 32 | DF | RUS | Vasili Mironik |
| 34 | MF | RUS | Aleksei Tkach |
| 35 | FW | RUS | Fyodor Dvornikov |
| 36 | DF | RUS | Dmitri Domin |
| 37 | DF | RUS | Anri Khagba |
| 39 | DF | RUS | Andrei Demchenko |
| 42 | DF | RUS | Artyom Kulishev |
| 43 | MF | RUS | Timur Mirzoyev |
| 44 | FW | RUS | Andrei Arefyev |
| 45 | FW | RUS | Dmitri Kuharchuk |
| 52 | DF | RUS | Aleksandr Tundenkov |

| No. | Pos. | Nation | Player |
|---|---|---|---|
| 53 | DF | RUS | Dmitri Chistyakov |
| 54 | MF | RUS | Sergei Mikhailov |
| 56 | MF | RUS | Vitali Ivanov |
| 57 | DF | RUS | Ivan Terentyev |
| 58 | MF | RUS | Dmitri Kartashov |
| 59 | MF | RUS | Artyom Eskov |
| 60 | MF | RUS | Asker Nadzhafaliyev |
| 63 | DF | RUS | Temur Mustafin |
| 65 | DF | RUS | Anton Kotenev |
| 66 | DF | RUS | Igor Gubanov |
| 68 | DF | RUS | Andrei Zotov |
| 70 | FW | RUS | Magomed Kurbanov |

== Transfers ==
=== Winter 2010–11 ===
In: Note: Flags indicate national team as defined under FIFA eligibility rules; some limited exceptions apply. Players may hold more than one non-FIFA nationality.

| No. | Pos. | Nation | Player |
|---|---|---|---|
| 1 | GK | CZE | Martin Lejsal (from (Czech Republic) Zbrojovka Brno) |
| 3 | DF | SVK | Kornel Saláta (from (Slovakia) Slovan Bratislava) |
| 5 | DF | RUS | Aleksandr Khokhlov (from (Russia) Zenit St. Petersburg) |
| 10 | FW | RUS | Dmitri Kirichenko (from (Russia) Saturn Moscow Oblast) |
| 13 | MF | RUS | Aleksei Rebko (from (Russia) Dynamo Moscow) |
| 17 | MF | RUS | Maksim Grigoryev (on loan from (Russia) MITOS Novocherkassk) |
| 20 | DF | TUN | Anis Boussaidi (from (Greece) PAOK) |
| 30 | GK | RUS | Anton Kochenkov (on loan from (Russia) Volga Nizhny Novgorod) |
| 33 | MF | RUS | Dmitri Malyaka (on loan from (Russia) MITOS Novocherkassk) |
| 34 | MF | RUS | Aleksei Tkach |
| 35 | FW | RUS | Fyodor Dvornikov |
| 36 | DF | RUS | Dmitri Domrin |
| 41 | GK | RUS | Artyom Orsayev (from (Russia) Taganrog) |
| 42 | MF | RUS | Artyom Kulishev |
| 43 | MF | RUS | Timur Mirzoyev |
| 45 | FW | RUS | Dmitri Kukharchuk (from (Russia) Lokomotiv Moscow) |
| 50 | DF | RUS | Mikhail Martynov |
| 51 | GK | RUS | Rasul Farfutdinov |
| 63 | DF | RUS | Temur Mustafin |
| 65 | DF | RUS | Anton Kotenev |
| 68 | DF | RUS | Andrei Zotov |
| 69 | MF | RUS | Yevgeni Filippov (on loan from (Russia) MITOS Novocherkassk) |
| 88 | FW | LTU | Edgaras Česnauskis (from (Russia) Dynamo Moscow) |
| 90 | MF | RUS | Artyom Kulesha (on loan from (Russia) Rubin Kazan) |
| 99 | MF | RUS | Oleg Ivanov (from (Russia) Krylia Sovetov Samara) |

Out: Note: Flags indicate national team as defined under FIFA eligibility rules; some limited exceptions apply. Players may hold more than one non-FIFA nationality.

| No. | Pos. | Nation | Player |
|---|---|---|---|
| 1 | GK | BLR | Anton Amelchenko (to (Russia) Lokomotiv Moscow) |
| 3 | DF | SRB | Dušan Anđelković (to (Russia) Krasnodar) |
| 5 | DF | RUS | Aleksandr Cherkes (to (Russia) Fakel Voronezh) |
| 7 | MF | BLR | Alyaksandr Kulchiy (to (Russia) Krasnodar) |
| 8 | DF | RUS | Gia Grigalava (end of loan from (Russia) SKA Rostov-on-Don) |
| 10 | FW | RUS | Dmitry Akimov (to (Russia) Sibir Novosibirsk) |
| 11 | MF | RUS | Igor Lebedenko (to (Russia) Rubin Kazan) |
| 16 | GK | RUS | Vladimir Zabuga (to (Russia) Taganrog) |
| 17 | DF | RUS | Sergei Shustikov (to (Russia) Volga Ulyanovsk) |
| 19 | FW | BIH | Mersudin Ahmetović (to (Russia) Volga Nizhny Novgorod) |
| 20 | MF | RUS | Artur Valikayev (to (Russia) Spartak Moscow) |
| 21 | FW | PRK | Hong Yong-Jo (released) |
| 24 | DF | ROU | Sorin Ghionea (to (Romania) Politehnica Timișoara) |
| 25 | MF | RUS | Aleksandr Pavlenko (end of loan from (Russia) Spartak Moscow) |
| 28 | FW | RUS | Artyom Serdyuk (to (Russia) MITOS Novocherkassk) |
| 33 | MF | RUS | Sergei Tumasyan (released) |
| 37 | DF | RUS | Oleg Leshchikov (to (Russia) Astrakhan) |
| 39 | MF | RUS | Mirzaga Huseynpur (to (Russia) MITOS Novocherkassk) |
| 40 | MF | RUS | Igor Ponomaryov (released) |
| 42 | FW | RUS | Anton Kabanov (released) |
| 45 | MF | RUS | Oleg Solonukha (released) |
| 48 | DF | RUS | Aleksandr Mitkin (released) |
| 50 | MF | RUS | Irakli Khokhba (released) |
| 56 | MF | RUS | David Tkebuchava (released) |
| 77 | MF | MDA | Stanislav Ivanov (end of loan from (Russia) Lokomotiv Moscow) |
| — | GK | RUS | Maksim Kabanov (to (Russia) Volgar-Gazprom Astrakhan, previously on loan to (Russia) Salyut Belgorod) |
| — | DF | RUS | Astemir Sheriyev (released, previously on loan to (Russia) Nizhny Novgorod) |
| — | FW | RUS | Yevgeni Lutsenko (to (Russia) SKA-Energiya Khabarovsk, previously on loan to (Russia) Salyut Belgorod) |

=== Summer 2011 ===
In: Note: Flags indicate national team as defined under FIFA eligibility rules; some limited exceptions apply. Players may hold more than one non-FIFA nationality.

| No. | Pos. | Nation | Player |
|---|---|---|---|
| 6 | MF | ARG | Oscar Ahumada (from (Mexico) Veracruz) |
| 7 | MF | BRA | Élson (from (Germany) Stuttgart) |
| 12 | GK | RUS | Ilya Madilov (from (Russia) Istra) |
| 16 | DF | EST | Dmitri Kruglov (from (Azerbaijan) Inter Baku) |
| 18 | FW | CZE | Michal Papadopulos (from (Russia) Zhemchuzhina-Sochi) |
| 19 | FW | ARG | Héctor Bracamonte (from (Russia) Terek Grozny) |
| 21 | GK | CRO | Stipe Pletikosa (from (Russia) Spartak Moscow) |
| 28 | DF | RUS | Igor Smolnikov (on loan from (Russia) Lokomotiv Moscow) |
| 44 | FW | RUS | Andrei Arefyev |
| 46 | MF | RUS | Aleksei Ryabokon (from (Russia) Krasnodar) |
| 60 | MF | RUS | Asker Nadzhafaliyev |
| 72 | DF | RUS | Valentin Filatov (from (Russia) Spartak Nalchik) |
| 81 | MF | ROU | Răzvan Cociş (from (Saudi Arabia) Al Nassr) |
| 91 | DF | RUS | Alan Bagayev (from (Russia) FAYUR Beslan) |
| 92 | MF | RUS | Roman Yemelyanov (on loan from (Ukraine) Shakhtar Donetsk) |

Out: Note: Flags indicate national team as defined under FIFA eligibility rules; some limited exceptions apply. Players may hold more than one non-FIFA nationality.

| No. | Pos. | Nation | Player |
|---|---|---|---|
| 1 | GK | CZE | Martin Lejsal (released) |
| 25 | FW | RUS | Aleksei Sugak (on loan to (Belarus) Neman Grodno) |

=== Winter 2011–12 ===
In: Note: Flags indicate national team as defined under FIFA eligibility rules; some limited exceptions apply. Players may hold more than one non-FIFA nationality.

| No. | Pos. | Nation | Player |
|---|---|---|---|
| 23 | FW | RUS | Dmitry Poloz (from (Russia) Lokomotiv Moscow) |
| 24 | DF | RUS | Denis Kolodin (on loan from (Russia) Dynamo Moscow) |
| 29 | MF | RUS | Andrei Vasilyev (from (Russia) Zenit St. Petersburg) |
| 52 | DF | RUS | Aleksandr Tundenkov |
| 53 | DF | RUS | Dmitri Chistyakov |
| 54 | MF | RUS | Sergei Mikhailov |
| 56 | MF | RUS | Vitali Ivanov |
| 57 | DF | RUS | Ivan Terentyev |
| 58 | MF | RUS | Dmitri Kartashov |
| 59 | MF | RUS | Artyom Eskov |
| 62 | GK | RUS | Vladislav Suslov |
| 89 | DF | RUS | Vitali Dyakov (from (Russia) Lokomotiv Moscow) |
| 97 | GK | RUS | Sergei Pesyakov (on loan from (Russia) Spartak Moscow) |

Out: Note: Flags indicate national team as defined under FIFA eligibility rules; some limited exceptions apply. Players may hold more than one non-FIFA nationality.

| No. | Pos. | Nation | Player |
|---|---|---|---|
| 5 | DF | RUS | Aleksandr Khokhlov (released) |
| 8 | MF | BUL | Chavdar Yankov (end of loan from (Ukraine) Metalurh Donetsk) |
| 13 | MF | RUS | Aleksei Rebko (to (Russia) Tom Tomsk) |
| 14 | DF | RUS | Anri Khagush (end of loan from (Russia) Rubin Kazan) |
| 17 | FW | RUS | Maksim Grigoryev (end of loan from (Russia) MITOS Novocherkassk) |
| 20 | DF | TUN | Anis Boussaidi (to (Ukraine) Tavriya Simferopol) |
| 30 | GK | RUS | Anton Kochenkov (end of loan from (Russia) Volga Nizhny Novgorod) |
| 31 | GK | RUS | Aleksandr Solovyov (on loan to (Russia) MITOS Novocherkassk) |
| 33 | MF | RUS | Dmitri Malyaka (end of loan from (Russia) MITOS Novocherkassk) |
| 38 | MF | RUS | Karlen Vartanyan (to (Russia) Taganrog) |
| 40 | DF | RUS | Dmitri Dolya (released) |
| 46 | MF | RUS | Aleksei Ryabokon (released) |
| 49 | MF | RUS | Nikita Vasilyev (on loan to (Russia) Chernomorets Novorossiysk) |
| 50 | DF | RUS | Mikhail Martynov (released) |
| 51 | GK | RUS | Rasul Farfutdinov (to (Russia) Podolye Podolsky district) |
| 55 | MF | RUS | Sergei Tumasyan (released) |
| 63 | MF | RUS | Temur Mustafin (to (Russia) Lokomotiv Moscow) |
| 69 | MF | RUS | Yevgeni Filippov (end of loan from (Russia) MITOS Novocherkassk) |
| 77 | DF | UKR | Andriy Proshyn (to (Russia) Sibir Novosibirsk) |
| 90 | DF | RUS | Artyom Kulesha (end of loan from (Russia) Rubin Kazan) |
| 91 | DF | RUS | Alan Bagayev (to (Russia) Alania-d Vladikavkaz) |
| 99 | MF | RUS | Oleg Ivanov (to (Russia) Terek Grozny) |
| — | FW | RUS | Aleksei Sugak (on loan to (Russia) SKA Rostov-on-Don, previously on loan to (Belarus) Neman Grodno) |

== Competitions ==
=== Premier League ===
==== First phase ====
===== Results by round =====
| Round | 1 | 2 | 3 | 4 | 5 | 6 | 7 | 8 | 9 | 10 | 11 | 12 | 13 | 14 | 15 | 16 | 17 | 18 | 19 | 20 | 21 | 22 | 23 | 24 | 25 | 26 | 27 | 28 | 29 | 30 |
|---|---|---|---|---|---|---|---|---|---|---|---|---|---|---|---|---|---|---|---|---|---|---|---|---|---|---|---|---|---|---|
| Ground | H | A | A | H | A | H | A | H | A | H | A | H | A | H | A | A | H | H | A | H | A | H | A | H | A | H | A | H | A | H |
| Result | W | W | D | L | L | W | L | D | L | W | D | L | L | L | D | L | L | L | W | L | D | D | W | D | W | W | L | L | D | W |
| Position | 6 | 7 | 8 | 10 | 13 | 10 | 13 | 12 | 13 | 10 | 10 | 12 | 13 | 14 | 14 | 14 | 14 | 14 | 14 | 14 | 14 | 14 | 12 | 13 | 10 | 10 | 10 | 10 | 10 | 10 |

Updated to match(es) played on 5 November 2011. Source:
A = Away; H = Home; W = Win; D = Draw; L = Loss

===== Results =====
| 14 March 2011 1 | Rostov | 4 – 0 | Spartak Moscow | Rostov-on-Don |
| 19:30 MSK (UTC+3) | Adamov 6', 48'; Blatnjak 73'; Kalachev 80' | Report | Rodri (yellow card) 45'; Mahmudov (yellow card) 61' | Stadium: Olimp – 2 Attendance: 15,000; Referee: Vladislav Bezborodov |
Note: MSK time changed from (UTC+3) to (UTC+4) on 27 March 2011 .

| 19 March 2011 2 | Dynamo Moscow | 3 – 1 | Rostov | Khimki |
| 17:15 MSK (UTC+3) | Karyaka (yellow card) 39'; Fernández 50'; Wilkshire (yellow card) 63'; Misimović 75'; Voronin 90' | Report | Kalachev (yellow card) 22'; Česnauskis (yellow card) 24'; Adamov (yellow card) 26'; Okoronkwo (yellow card) 33'; Khokhlov (yellow card) 74'; Khagush 86' | Stadium: Arena Khimki; Attendance: 6,841; Referee: Vyacheslav Popov |
Note: MSK time changed from (UTC+3) to (UTC+4) on 27 March 2011 .

| 2 April 2011 3 | Lokomotiv Moscow | 1 – 1 | Rostov | Moscow |
| 18:30 MSK (UTC+4) | Yanbayev (yellow card) 28'; Ignatyev 74'; Loskov (yellow card) 86' | Report | Khagush (yellow card) 13'; Gațcan (yellow card) 55'; Grigoryev 83' | Stadium: Lokomotiv Stadium; Attendance: 8,500; Referee: Vladimir Pettay |

| 10 April 2011 4 | Rostov | 1 – 3 | Volga Nizhny Novgorod | Rostov-on-Don |
| 14:00 MSK (UTC+4) | Saláta (yellow card) 4'; Khagush (yellow card) 71'; Okoronkwo (yellow card) 71' (goal) 81' | Report | Yashin (yellow card) 6'; Khojava (yellow card) 32' (yellow-red card) 82' (goal) 45'; Pleșan (yellow card) 37'; Khazov 52'; Grigalava (yellow card) 71'; Tursunov 75' | Stadium: Olimp-2; Attendance: 8,000; Referee: Timur Arslanbekov |

| 16 April 2011 5 | Kuban Krasnodar | 2 – 0 | Rostov | Krasnodar |
| 16:15 MSK (UTC+4) | Traoré 9'; Zelão 35'; Kozlov (yellow card) 42' (yellow-red card) 60' | Report | Yankov (yellow card) 24'; Boussaïdi (yellow card) 43'; Khokhlov (yellow card) 56'; Khagush (yellow card) 79'; Grigoryev (yellow card) 81' | Stadium: Kuban Stadium; Attendance: 15,600; Referee: Maksim Layushkin |

| 22 April 2011 6 | Rostov | 1 – 0 | Terek Grozny | Rostov-on-Don |
| 16:15 MSK (UTC+4) | Khagush (yellow card) 3'; Blatnjak 34' (pen.); Yankov (yellow card) 60' | Report | Amelyanchuk (yellow card) 15'; Dzhanayev (yellow card) 33'; Sadayev (yellow card) 76' | Stadium: Olimp-2; Attendance: 7,500; Referee: Aleksei Nikolaev |

| 1 May 2011 7 | Anzhi Makhachkala | 1 – 0 | Rostov | Mahachkala |
| 14:15 MSK (UTC+4) | Gadzhibekov (yellow card) 21'; Roberto Carlos 57' (pen.); Tagirbekov (yellow card) 81' | Report | Ivanov (yellow card) 52'; Gațcan (yellow card) 63'; Proshyn (red card) 82'; Adamov (yellow card) 90' | Stadium: Dinamo Stadium; Attendance: 15,200; Referee: Stanislav Sukhina |

| 7 May 2011 8 | Rostov | 0 – 0 | Spartak Nalchik | Rostov-on-Don |
| 18:30 MSK (UTC+4) | Yankov (yellow card) 29' (yellow-red card) 71'; Khagush (yellow card) 57' | Report | Zahirović (yellow card) 32'; Bagayev (yellow card) 55'; Jovanović (yellow card) 73' | Stadium: Olimp-2; Attendance: 7,000; Referee: Sergey Lapochkin |

| 15 May 2011 9 | CSKA Moscow | 2 – 1 | Rostov | Khimki |
| 20:30 MSK (UTC+4) | Necid 29'; Dzagoev (yellow card) 32'; Mamayev 44' | Report | Grigoryev (yellow card) 26'; Gațcan (yellow card) 32'; Česnauskis (yellow card) 34'; Saláta 47'; Khokhlov (yellow card) 53' | Stadium: Arena Khimki; Attendance: 6,000; Referee: Mikhail Vilkov |

| 21 May 2011 10 | Rostov | 3 – 0 | Amkar Perm | Rostov-on-Don |
| 14:00 MSK (UTC+4) | Okoronkwo (yellow card) 35'; Grigoryev (yellow card) 45+3'; Adamov 50'; Gațcan 82'; Blatnjak 87' | Report | Sekretov (yellow card) 10'; Mijailović (yellow card) 49'; Novaković (yellow card) 71' | Stadium: Olimp-2; Attendance: 6,500; Referee: Maksim Layushkin |

| 29 May 2011 11 | Krylia Sovetov | 2 – 2 | Rostov | Samara |
| 18:15 MSK (UTC+4) | Savin 45', 55' | Report | Gațcan 29' (yellow card) 77'; Adamov 37'; Khagush (yellow card) 90+' | Stadium: Metallurg Stadion; Attendance: 12,400; Referee: Yuri Baskakov |

| 10 June 2011 12 | Rostov | 1 – 3 | Krasnodar | Rostov-on-Don |
| 21:00 MSK (UTC+4) | Kirichenko 15' (pen.); Adamov (yellow card) 60'; Khagush (yellow card) 74' | Report | Markov (yellow card) 14'; Tatarchuk 33'; Movsisyan 46'; Márcio 53' (yellow card) 67'; Kulchy (yellow card) 72'; Yerokhin (yellow card) 86' | Stadium: Olimp-2; Attendance: 8,000; Referee: Vyacheslav Popov |

| 14 June 2011 13 | Zenit St.Petersburg | 4 – 0 | Rostov | Saint-Petersburg |
| 18:45 MSK (UTC+4) | Ionov 1'; Lazović 40'; Huszti 72'; Bukharov 90' | Report | Khokhlov (yellow card) 20'; Adamov (yellow card) 65'; Khagush (yellow card) 79' | Stadium: Petrovsky Stadium; Attendance: 15,081; Referee: Almir Kayumov |

| 18 June 2011 14 | Rostov | 1 – 3 | Rubin Kazan | Rostov-on-Don |
| 21:00 MSK (UTC+4) | Malyaka (yellow card) 12'; Kirichenko 50' (pen.); Kochenkov (yellow card) 72'; Česnauskis (yellow card) 84'; Saláta (yellow card) 87'; Gațcan (yellow card) 89' | Report | Lebedenko 13'; Bocchetti (yellow card) 44'; Kislyak (yellow card) 49'; Ryazantsev 82'; Kislyak 90' | Stadium: Olimp-2; Attendance: 9,500; Referee: Aleksandr Egorov |

| 22 June 2011 15 | Tom Tomsk | 1 – 1 | Rostov | Tomsk |
| 15:30 MSK (UTC+4) | Kanunnikov 66' (pen.) | Report | Česnauskis (yellow card) 51'; Okoronkwo (red card) 64'; Adamov (yellow card) 68' (goal) 82' (pen.); Malyaka (yellow card) 78' | Stadium: Trud Stadium; Attendance: 9,000; Referee: Vitali Meshkov |

| 26 June 2011 16 | Spartak Moscow | 3 – 2 | Rostov | Moscow |
| 21:00 MSK (UTC+4) | Welliton 54'; Kulesha 57' (o.g.); Rodri (yellow card) 73'; D.Kombarov 81'; Ananidze (yellow card) 85' | Report | Khagush (yellow card) 44'; Gațcan (yellow card) 52' (goal) 67'; Adamov 63'; Malyaka (yellow card) 79'; Vasilyev (yellow card) 90+' | Stadium: Luzhniki Stadium; Attendance: 8,582; Referee: Sergey Lapochkin |

| 24 July 2011 17 | Rostov | 0 – 2 | Dynamo Moscow | Rostov-on-Don |
| 20:00 MSK (UTC+4) | Kalachev (yellow card) 31' (yellow-red card) 88'; Adamov (yellow card) 62'; Khagush (yellow card) 90+' | Report | Shemshov 12', 76'; Wilkshire (yellow card) 31'; Granat (yellow card) 46'; Voronin (yellow card) 52' | Stadium: Olimp-2; Attendance: 9,000; Referee: Vladislav Bezborodov |

| 31 July 2011 18 | Rostov | 0 – 3 | Lokomotiv Moscow | Rostov-on-Don |
| 21:00 MSK (UTC+4) | Khagush (yellow card) 14' (yellow-red card) 86'; Ivanov (yellow card) 52'; Okoronkwo (yellow card) 55' | Report | Loskov 8'; Glushakov (yellow card) 11'; Ignatyev (yellow card) 43'; Sychev 56' (pen.); Tarasov 81' | Stadium: Olimp-2; Attendance: 9,500; Referee: Aleksandr Egorov |

| 6 August 2011 19 | Volga Nizhny Novgorod | 0 – 1 | Rostov | Nizhny Novgorod |
| 21:00 MSK (UTC+4) | Pleșan (yellow card) 7'; Bondar (yellow card) 29'; Khojava (yellow card) 62'; Javadov (yellow card) 71'; Ajinjal (yellow card) 86' | Report | Gațcan (yellow card) 65' (yellow-red card) 88'; Élson (yellow card) 78'; Bracamonte 82' (yellow card) 87'; Boussaïdi (red card) 83'; Bayramyan (yellow card) 84' | Stadium: Lokomotiv Stadium; Attendance: 5,000; Referee: Sergey Lapochkin |

| 13 August 2011 20 | Rostov | 1 – 2 | Kuban Krasnodar | Rostov-on-Don |
| 21:00 MSK (UTC+4) | Adamov (yellow card) 37'; Bracamonte 57'; Ivanov (yellow card) 80' | Report | Zelão 23'; Bugayev (yellow card) 32'; Fidler (yellow card) 61'; Né 63'; Komkov (yellow card) 88' | Stadium: Olimp-2; Attendance: 11,000; Referee: Sergei Karasev |

| 20 August 2011 21 | Terek Grozny | 1 – 1 | Rostov | Grozny |
| 20:30 MSK (UTC+4) | Asildarov (yellow card) 7'; Ferreira (yellow card) 35'; Sadayev (yellow card) 80'; Cociș 90' (o.g.) | Report | Kalachev 18'; Bracamonte (yellow card) 37'; Pletikosa (yellow card) 45+3'; Ivanov (yellow card) 67' | Stadium: Akhmat-Arena; Attendance: 12,300; Referee: Maksim Layushkin |

| 27 August 2011 22 | Rostov | 1 – 1 | Anzhi Makhachkala | Rostov-on-Don |
| 20:00 MSK (UTC+4) | Okoronkwo (yellow card) 5'; Cociș (yellow card) 59'; Kalachev 72' (yellow card) 82' | Report | Agalarov (yellow card) 74'; Eto'o 80'; Zhirkov (yellow card) 82' | Stadium: Olimp-2; Attendance: 15,840; Referee: Igor Egorov |

| 11 September 2011 23 | Spartak Nalchik | 0 – 1 | Rostov | Nalchik |
| 16:00 MSK (UTC+4) | | Report | Kalachev (yellow card) 17'; Adamov (penalty missed) 38'; Cociș 83'; Khagush (yellow card) 90+' | Stadium: Spartak Stadium; Attendance: 7,000; Referee: Igor Fedotov |

| 18 September 2011 24 | Rostov | 1 – 1 | CSKA Moscow | Rostov-on-Don |
| 14:00 MSK (UTC+4) | Kriglov 5'; Kalachev (yellow card) 41'; Bayramyan (yellow card) 67'; Khagush (yellow card) 74' | Report | Doumbia 65' | Stadium: Olimp-2; Attendance: 15,000; Referee: Mikhail Vilkov |

| 25 September 2011 25 | Amkar Perm | 0 – 1 | Rostov | Perm |
| 16:15 MSK (UTC+4) | Mijailović (yellow card) 45' | Report | Yemelyanov (yellow card) 45+2' (yellow-red card) 49'; Adamov 50' | Stadium: Zvezda Stadium; Attendance: 6,200; Referee: Almir Kayumov |

| 1 October 2011 26 | Rostov | 1 – 0 | Krylia Sovetov | Rostov-on-Don |
| 15:30 MSK (UTC+4) | Cociș (yellow card) 83'; Smolnikov 86' | Report | Taranov (yellow card) 63'; Kornilenko (yellow card) 87'; Vyeramko (yellow card) 90+' | Stadium: Olimp-2; Attendance: 6,900; Referee: Sergey Kuznetsov |

| 14 October 2011 27 | Krasnodar | 2 – 0 | Rostov | Krasnodar |
| 16:15 MSK (UTC+4) | Márcio (yellow card) 22'; Shipitsin 61'; Joãozinho 57'; Drinčić (yellow card) 67' | Report | Élson (yellow card) 4'; Khagush (yellow card) 40'; Gațcan (yellow card) 65'; Filatov (yellow card) 75'; Bracamonte (yellow card) 78'; Okoronkwo (yellow card) 90+' | Stadium: Kuban Stadium; Attendance: 6,800; Referee: Maksim Layushkin |

| 23 October 2011 28 | Rostov | 1 – 3 | Zenit St.Petersburg | Rostov-on-Don |
| 15:00 MSK (UTC+4) | Smolnikov (yellow card) 15'; Ahumada (yellow card) 19'; Bracamonte 49'; Cociș (yellow card) 62'; Kalachev (yellow card) 72'; Adamov (yellow card) 85' | Report | Danny 9', (yellow card) 87'; Luković 15' (pen.), (yellow card) 61'; Bukharov 32', (yellow card) 65'; Shirokov (yellow card) 69'; Alves (yellow card) 80'; Bystrov (yellow card) 90' | Stadium: Olimp-2; Attendance: 15,000; Referee: Timur Arslanbekov |

| 28 October 2011 29 | Rubin Kazan | 1 – 1 | Rostov | Kazan |
| 18:00 MSK (UTC+4) | Sharonov (yellow card) 37'; Bocchetti (yellow card) 50' (goal) 56' | Report | Okoronkwo (yellow card) 18'; Grigoryev 61' | Stadium: Central Stadium; Attendance: 9,710; Referee: Igor Egorov |

| 5 November 2011 30 | Rostov | 2 – 1 | Tom Tomsk | Rostov-on-Don |
| 14:00 MSK (UTC+4) | Saláta (yellow card) 8' (yellow-red card) 74'; Bracamonte 20' (yellow card) 35'; Kruglov (yellow card) 50'; Okoronkwo (yellow card) 81'; Cociș 90' | Report | Nikitinsky (yellow card) 7'; K.Pogrebnyak (yellow card) 25'; Stroyev 68'; Ropotan (yellow card) 87'; Savin (yellow card) 90+' | Stadium: Olimp-2; Attendance: 6,000; Referee: Almir Kayumov |

===== Table =====
| Pos | Team | Pld | W | D | L | GF | GA | GD | Pts | Qualification |
|---|---|---|---|---|---|---|---|---|---|---|
| 8 | Anzhi Makhachkala | 30 | 13 | 9 | 8 | 38 | 32 | +6 | 48 | Qualification to Championship group |
| 9 | Krasnodar | 30 | 10 | 8 | 12 | 38 | 43 | −5 | 38 | Qualification to Relegation group |
| 10 | Rostov | 30 | 8 | 8 | 14 | 31 | 45 | −14 | 32 | Qualification to Relegation group |
| 11 | Terek Grozny | 30 | 8 | 7 | 15 | 29 | 45 | −16 | 31 | Qualification to Relegation group |
| 12 | Volga Nizhny Novgorod | 30 | 8 | 4 | 18 | 24 | 40 | −16 | 28 | Qualification to Relegation group |

Source: Russian Premier League
Rules for classification: 1) points; 2) number of wins; 3) head-to-head points; 4) number of head-to-head wins; 5) head-to-head goal difference; 6) number of head-to-head goals scored; 7) number of head-to-head away goals scored; 8) goal difference; 9) number of goals scored; 10) number of away goals scored.

==== Relegation Group ====
===== Results by round =====
| Round | 1 | 2 | 3 | 4 | 5 | 6 | 7 | 8 | 9 | 10 | 11 | 12 | 13 | 14 |
|---|---|---|---|---|---|---|---|---|---|---|---|---|---|---|
| Ground | H | H | A | H | A | H | A | A | H | A | H | A | H | A |
| Result | W | D | L | W | L | W | L | L | D | L | D | D | W | L |
| Position | 10 | 10 | 10 | 10 | 11 | 10 | 11 | 12 | 12 | 12 | 12 | 13 | 13 | 13 |

Updated to match(es) played on 12 May 2012. Source:
A = Away; H = Home; W = Win; D = Draw; L = Loss

===== Results =====
| 20 November 2011 31 | Rostov | 3 – 1 | Tom Tomsk | Rostov-on-Don |
| 18:30 MSK (UTC+4) | Khagush (yellow card) 22'; Gațcan (yellow card) 55'; Adamov 56' (pen.), 88'; Papadopulos 70'; Boussaïdi (yellow card) 79' | Report | Stroyev (red card) 15'; Sabitov (yellow card) 19'; Kanunnikov 22' (pen.); Boyarintsev (yellow card) 32'; Nikitinsky (yellow card) 34' (yellow-red card) 53'; Kharitonov (yellow card) 55' | Stadium: Olimp-2; Attendance: 4,002; Referee: Igor Fedotov |

| 27 November 2011 32 | Rostov | 1 – 1 | Amkar Perm | Rostov-on-Don |
| 14:15 MSK (UTC+4) | Smolnikov (yellow card) 7'; Cociș 33'; Filatov (yellow card) 83' | Report | Cherenchikov (yellow card) 27'; Kolomeytsev 57'; Novaković (yellow card) 66' | Stadium: Olimp-2; Attendance: 4,000; Referee: Timur Arslanbekov |

| 5 March 2012 33 | Krasnodar | 1 – 0 | Rostov | Krasnodar |
| 18:30 MSK (UTC+4) | Movsisyan (penalty missed) 11'; Drinčić (yellow card) 12'; Vranješ (yellow card) 68'; Anđelković (yellow card) 77'; Lambarschi (yellow card) 79'; Golyshev 90' | Report | Adamov (yellow card) 10'; Saláta (yellow card) 45'; Smolnikov (yellow card) 56'; Česnauskis (yellow card) 74'; Kolodin (yellow card) 78'; Okoronkwo (yellow card) 89' | Stadium: Kuban Stadium; Attendance: 4,000; Referee: Vitali Meshkov |

| 11 March 2012 34 | Rostov | 1 – 0 | Krylia Sovetov | Rostov-on-Don |
| 18:30 MSK (UTC+4) | Kalachev 21'; Česnauskis (yellow card) 47'; Gațcan (yellow card) 50' (yellow-red card) 65' | Report | Joseph-Reinette (yellow card) 30' | Stadium: Olimp-2; Attendance: 6,500; Referee: Igor Egorov |

| 17 March 2012 35 | Terek Grozny | 1 – 0 | Rostov | Grozny |
| 16:30 MSK (UTC+4) | Asildarov 48' | Summary | Adamov (yellow card) 81' | Stadium: Akhmat-Arena; Attendance: 18,200; Referee: Vasiliy Kazartsev |

| 24 March 2012 36 | Rostov | 2 – 1 | Spartak Nalchik | Rostov-on-Don |
| 15:00 MSK (UTC+4) | Bracamonte 11'; Saláta 31'; Cociș (yellow card) 43'; Filatov (yellow card) 80'; Adamov (yellow card) 87' | Report | Skvernyuk (yellow card) 9'; Mitrishev (yellow card) 47'; Shchanitsyn (yellow card) 55'; Zahirović 61'; Siradze (red card) 80'; Rukhaia (yellow card) 80'; Džudović (yellow card) 80' | Stadium: Olimp-2; Attendance: 5,200; Referee: Vladislav Bezborodov |

| 31 March 2012 37 | Volga Nizhny Novgorod | 2 – 0 | Rostov | Nizhny Novgorod |
| 14:00 MSK (UTC+4) | Bibilov 6'; Maksimov (yellow card) 22'; Karyaka 32' (pen.) | Report | Česnauskis (yellow card) 36'; Smolnikov (yellow card) 85'; Gațcan (yellow card) 90+' | Stadium: Lokomotiv Stadium; Attendance: 5,200; Referee: Sergei Karasev |

| 7 April 2012 38 | Amkar Perm | 1 – 0 | Rostov | Perm |
| 14:00 MSK (UTC+4) | Sirakov (yellow card) 1' (yellow-red card) 59'; Belorukov (yellow card) 47'; Gațcan 69' (o.g.); Peev (yellow card) 90+' | Report | Élson (yellow card) 28'; Cociș (yellow card) 42'; Gațcan (yellow card) 49'; Yemelyanov (yellow card) 50'; Kolodin (yellow card) 69' | Stadium: Zvezda Stadium; Attendance: 9,100; Referee: Almir Kayumov |

| 15 April 2012 39 | Rostov | 1 – 1 | Krasnodar | Rostov-on-Don |
| 19:00 MSK (UTC+4) | Gațcan (yellow card) 73'; Kirichenko 90+1' | Report | Movsisyan 74' (pen.) (yellow card) 86' | Stadium: Olimp-2; Attendance: 6,450; Referee: Timur Arslanbekov |

| 21 April 2012 40 | Krylia Sovetov | 2 – 1 | Rostov | Samara |
| 17:15 MSK (UTC+4) | Kornilenko 3', 90+1' (pen.); Svezhov (yellow card) 14'; Yakovlev (yellow card) 29' | Report | Kirichenko (yellow card) 10'; Adamov 19'; Kolodin (yellow card) 44' (yellow-red card) 49'; Bracamonte (yellow card) 52' | Stadium: Metallurg Stadium; Attendance: 15,850; Referee: Maksim Layushkin |

| 27 April 2012 41 | Rostov | 1 – 1 | Terek Grozny | Rostov-on-Don |
| 19:30 MSK (UTC+4) | Adamov 3'; Smolnikov (yellow card) 18'; Pletikosa (yellow card) 26'; Poloz (yellow card) 41'; Okoronkwo (yellow card) 89' | Report | Sadayev (yellow card) 26'; Georgiev (yellow card) 36' (goal) 39'; Ivanov (yellow card) 38'; Ferreira (yellow card) 40'; Lebedenko (yellow card) 68'; Asildarov (yellow card) 78' | Stadium: Olimp-2; Attendance: 4,700; Referee: Igor Egorov |

| 2 May 2012 42 | Spartak Nalchik | 2 – 2 | Rostov | Nalchik |
| 16:15 MSK (UTC+4) | Fomin 5'; Khagush (yellow card) 12'; Goshokov (yellow card) 48'; Aravin (yellow card) 57' (yellow-red card) 63'; Kontsedalov (yellow card) 71' (goal) 80' (pen.); Shchanitsyn (yellow card) 71' | Report | Bracamonte 22' (pen.); Smolnikov (yellow card) 26' (yellow-red card) 89'; Kolodin (yellow card) 45+'; Gațcan 68'; Yemelyanov (yellow card) 80' | Stadium: Spartak Stadium; Attendance: 2,000; Referee: Aleksandr Egorov |

| 6 May 2012 43 | Rostov | 1 – 0 | Volga Nizhny Novgorod | Rostov-on-Don |
| 18:15 MSK (UTC+4) | Gațcan (yellow card) 74'; Kirichenko 75' | Report | Chicherin (yellow card) 48'; Bendz (red card) 66'; Maksimov (yellow card) 78'; Malyarov (yellow card) 80'; Shulenin (yellow card) 89'; Getigezhev (yellow card) 90'; Belozyorov (yellow card) 90+' | Stadium: Olimp-2; Attendance: 5,200; Referee: Vladislav Bezborodov |

| 12 May 2012 44 | Tom Tomsk | 2 – 1 | Rostov | Tomsk |
| 15:30 MSK (UTC+4) | Stroyev (yellow card) 19'; Gultyayev (yellow card) 44'; Khazov 58'; Rebko 90+3' (pen.) | Report | Bracamonte (yellow card) 52'; Yemelyanov (yellow card) 64'; Kirichenko 85' | Stadium: Trud Stadium; Attendance: 9,000; Referee: Timur Arslanbekov |

===== Table =====
| Pos | Team | Pld | W | D | L | GF | GA | GD | Pts | Qualification or relegation |
|---|---|---|---|---|---|---|---|---|---|---|
| 9 | Krasnodar | 44 | 16 | 13 | 15 | 58 | 61 | −3 | 61 | |
| 10 | Amkar Perm | 44 | 14 | 13 | 17 | 40 | 51 | −11 | 55 | |
| 11 | Terek Grozny | 44 | 14 | 10 | 20 | 45 | 62 | −17 | 52 | |
| 12 | Krylia Sovetov Samara | 44 | 12 | 15 | 17 | 33 | 50 | −17 | 51 | |
| 13 | Rostov (O) | 44 | 12 | 12 | 20 | 45 | 61 | −16 | 48 | Qualification to Relegation play-offs |
| 14 | Volga Nizhny Novgorod (O) | 44 | 12 | 5 | 27 | 37 | 60 | −23 | 41 | Qualification to Relegation play-offs |
| 15 | Tom Tomsk (R) | 44 | 8 | 13 | 23 | 30 | 70 | −40 | 37 | Relegation to Football National League |
| 16 | Spartak Nalchik (R) | 44 | 7 | 13 | 24 | 39 | 60 | −21 | 34 | Relegation to Football National League |

Source: Russian Premier League
Rules for classification: 1) points; 2) number of wins; 3) head-to-head points; 4) number of head-to-head wins; 5) head-to-head goal difference; 6) number of head-to-head goals scored; 7) number of head-to-head away goals scored; 8) goal difference; 9) number of goals scored; 10) number of away goals scored
(O) Play-off winners; (R) Relegated

==== Relegation play-offs ====
| 18 May 2012 First leg | Rostov | 3 – 0 | Shinnik Yaroslavl | Rostov-on-Don |
| 18:00 MSK (UTC+4) | Cociș 8'; Kirichenko 45'; Smolnikov (yellow card) 59'; Adamov 70' | Report | Burchenko (yellow card) 55' | Stadium: Olimp-2; Attendance: 8,950; Referee: Mikhail Vilkov |

| 22 May 2012 Second leg | Shinnik Yaroslavl | 0 – 1 (0 – 4 agg.) | Rostov | Yaroslavl |
| 20:00 MSK (UTC+4) | Sukhov (yellow card) 44'; Nizamutdinov (penalty missed) 52; Skrylnikov (yellow card) 79'; Steshin (yellow card) 83' | Report | Dyakov (yellow card) 51'; Gațcan (yellow card) 80'; Adamov 90' | Stadium: Shinnik Stadium; Attendance: 4,600; Referee: Vladislav Bezborodov |

=== Russian Cup ===
==== 2010-11 ====
| 20 April 2011 Quarterfinal | Dynamo Moscow | 1 – 2 | Rostov | Khimki |
| 19:30 MSK (UTC+4) | Samedov (yellow card) 32'; Sapeta 52'; Lomić (yellow card) 85' | Report | Ivanov (yellow card) 25'; Blatnjak (yellow card) 27' (goal) 90+2'; Grigoryev 32' (yellow card) 85'; Česnauskis (yellow card) 37' (yellow-red card) 61'; Proshyn (yellow card) 50'; Yankov (yellow card) 72' | Stadium: Arena Khimki; Attendance: 5,200; Referee: Mikhail Vilkov |

| 11 May 2011 Semifinal | Rostov | 0 – 0 (a.e.t.) (5 – 6 p) | Alania Vladikavkaz | Rostov-on-Don |
| 19:30 MSK (UTC+4) | Kalachev (yellow card) 10'; Adamov (yellow card) 68' | Report | Khubulov (yellow card) 45'; Gabulov (yellow card) 75'; Vandinho (yellow card) 85'; Gigolayev (yellow card) 112' | Stadium: Olimp-2; Attendance: 13,000; Referee: Sergei Karasyov |
| | Penalties |
| | Kirichenko (penalty scored); Rebko (penalty scored); M. Grigoryev (penalty scored); Blatnjak (penalty scored); Adamov (penalty scored); Boussaidi (penalty missed) | | (penalty scored) Bazayev; (penalty scored) Gabulov; (penalty scored) Bikmaev; (penalty scored) Neco; (penalty scored) Vandinho; (penalty scored) A. Grigoryev |

==== 2011-12 ====
| 17 July 2011 Round of 32 | Zhemchuzhina-Sochi | 1 – 2 | Rostov | Sochi |
| 19:00 MSK (UTC+4) | Dzhioyev (yellow card) 19'; Boyarintsev (yellow card) 45+'; Papadopulos 86' (pen.); Osipov (yellow card) 90+' | Report | Yankov (yellow card) 36'; Khagush (yellow card) 42'; Grigoryev 58'; Ivanov 69'; Kalachev (yellow card) 90+' | Stadium: Central Stadium; Attendance: 8,800; Referee: Vyacheslav Kharlamov |

| 21 September 2011 Round of 16 | Rostov | 3 – 1 | Tom Tomsk | Rostov-on-Don |
| 19:00 MSK (UTC+4) | Saláta 22'; Bracamonte 42'; Grigoryev 81' | Report | Kanunnikov (yellow card) 21'; Golyshev (yellow card) 27'; Savin 48' | Stadium: Olimp-2; Attendance: 6,500; Referee: Vladimir Rogulyov |

| 21 March 2012 Quarterfinals | Rostov | 0 – 0 (a.e.t.) (4 – 3 p) | Fakel Voronezh | Rostov-on-Don |
| 19:30 MSK (UTC+4) | Bracamonte (yellow card) 45'; Adamov (penalty missed) 70' | Report | Gapon (yellow card) 38'; Gitselov (yellow card) 62'; Mikhalyov (red card) 69'; Kantonistov (yellow card) 108' | Stadium: Olimp-2; Attendance: 6,000; Referee: Sergey Kuznetsov |
| | Penalties |
| | Élson (penalty missed); Gațcan (penalty scored); Bracamonte (penalty scored); Cociș (penalty scored); Adamov (penalty missed); Kruglov (penalty missed); Saláta (penalty scored) | | (penalty missed) Kantonistov; (penalty missed) Gitselov; (penalty scored) Klopkov; (penalty scored) Zhitnikov; (penalty scored) Gavryuk; (penalty missed) Ediyev; (penalty missed) Khabarov |

| 11 April 2012 Semifinal | Rubin Kazan | 2 – 0 | Rostov | Kazan |
| 18:00 MSK (UTC+4) | Bocchetti 82'; Smolnikov 84' (o.g.) | Report | Yemelyanov (yellow card) 11'; Bracamonte (yellow card) 63'; Okoronkwo (yellow card) 90+' | Stadium: Tsentralnyi Stadion; Attendance: 7,400; Referee: Aleksei Nikolaev |

== Squad statistics ==
As of match played 22 May 2012

=== Appearances and goals ===
| No. | Pos | Nat | Player | Total | | Premier League | | Relegation Play-off | | Russian Cup | |
| No. | Pos | Nat | Player | Apps | Goals | Apps | Goals | Apps | Goals | Apps | Goals |
|---|---|---|---|---|---|---|---|---|---|---|---|
| 2 | MF | (Belarus) BLR | Timofei Kalachev | 35 | 4 | 22+9 | 4 | 0 | 0 | 3+1 | 0 |
| 3 | DF | (Slovakia) SVK | Kornel Saláta | 45 | 3 | 39 | 2 | 0 | 0 | 6 | 1 |
| 4 | DF | (Nigeria) NGR | Isaac Okoronkwo | 38 | 0 | 32+1 | 0 | 0 | 0 | 5 | 0 |
| 6 | MF | (Argentina) ARG | Oscar Ahumada | 3 | 0 | 2 | 0 | 0 | 0 | 1 | 0 |
| 7 | MF | (Brazil) BRA | Élson | 17 | 0 | 8+8 | 0 | 0 | 0 | 0+1 | 0 |
| 9 | FW | (Russia) RUS | Roman Adamov | 48 | 13 | 40+2 | 11 | 0+2 | 2 | 2+2 | 0 |
| 10 | FW | (Russia) RUS | Dmitri Kirichenko | 24 | 2 | 5+14 | 1 | 2 | 1 | 0+3 | 0 |
| 11 | MF | (Bosnia and Herzegovina) BIH | Dragan Blatnjak | 24 | 1 | 15+4 | 0 | 2 | 0 | 1+2 | 1 |
| 15 | DF | (Serbia) SRB | Ivan Živanović | 7 | 0 | 6 | 0 | 0 | 0 | 1 | 0 |
| 16 | DF | (Estonia) EST | Dmitri Kruglov | 22 | 1 | 14+4 | 1 | 2 | 0 | 2 | 0 |
| 18 | FW | (Czech Republic) CZE | Michal Papadopulos | 11 | 1 | 9 | 1 | 0 | 0 | 2 | 0 |
| 19 | FW | (Argentina) ARG | Héctor Bracamonte | 28 | 7 | 12+12 | 6 | 0+1 | 0 | 3 | 1 |
| 21 | GK | (Croatia) CRO | Stipe Pletikosa | 25 | 0 | 23 | 0 | 2 | 0 | 0 | 0 |
| 22 | GK | (Serbia) SRB | Dejan Radić | 7 | 0 | 6 | 0 | 0 | 0 | 1 | 0 |
| 23 | FW | (Russia) RUS | Dmitry Poloz | 10 | 0 | 4+3 | 0 | 0+2 | 0 | 0+1 | 0 |
| 24 | DF | (Russia) RUS | Denis Kolodin | 11 | 0 | 8 | 0 | 2 | 0 | 1 | 0 |
| 28 | DF | (Russia) RUS | Igor Smolnikov | 28 | 1 | 19+4 | 1 | 2 | 0 | 3 | 0 |
| 29 | MF | (Russia) RUS | Andrei Vasilyev | 5 | 0 | 2+1 | 0 | 1+1 | 0 | 0 | 0 |
| 47 | MF | (Russia) RUS | Khoren Bayramyan | 20 | 0 | 3+13 | 0 | 1 | 0 | 1+2 | 0 |
| 72 | DF | (Russia) RUS | Valentin Filatov | 12 | 0 | 9+2 | 0 | 0 | 0 | 1 | 0 |
| 81 | MF | (Romania) ROU | Răzvan Cociș | 29 | 4 | 25 | 3 | 2 | 1 | 1+1 | 0 |
| 84 | MF | (Moldova) MDA | Alexandru Gațcan | 42 | 4 | 35 | 4 | 2 | 0 | 4+1 | 0 |
| 88 | MF | (Lithuania) LTU | Edgaras Česnauskis | 28 | 0 | 20+4 | 0 | 0 | 0 | 4 | 0 |
| 89 | DF | (Russia) RUS | Vitali Dyakov | 6 | 0 | 4 | 0 | 2 | 0 | 0 | 0 |
| 92 | MF | (Russia) RUS | Roman Yemelyanov | 19 | 0 | 7+7 | 0 | 2 | 0 | 3 | 0 |
| 97 | GK | (Russia) RUS | Sergei Pesyakov | 2 | 0 | 0 | 0 | 0 | 0 | 2 | 0 |
Players away from Rostov on loan during the season:
| 49 | MF | (Russia) RUS | Nikita Vasilyev | 3 | 0 | 3 | 0 | 0 | 0 | 0 | 0 |
Players left Rostov during the season:
| 5 | DF | (Russia) RUS | Aleksandr Khokhlov | 10 | 0 | 9+1 | 0 | 0 | 0 | 0 | 0 |
| 8 | MF | (Bulgaria) BUL | Chavdar Yankov | 17 | 0 | 14 | 0 | 0 | 0 | 3 | 0 |
| 13 | MF | (Russia) RUS | Aleksei Rebko | 15 | 0 | 9+5 | 0 | 0 | 0 | 0+1 | 0 |
| 14 | DF | (Russia) RUS | Anri Khagush | 28 | 1 | 25 | 1 | 0 | 0 | 3 | 0 |
| 17 | FW | (Russia) RUS | Maksim Grigoryev | 33 | 6 | 23+6 | 3 | 0 | 0 | 3+1 | 3 |
| 20 | DF | (Tunisia) TUN | Anis Boussaïdi | 18 | 0 | 14+1 | 0 | 0 | 0 | 3 | 0 |
| 30 | GK | (Russia) RUS | Anton Kochenkov | 20 | 0 | 15+2 | 0 | 0 | 0 | 3 | 0 |
| 33 | MF | (Russia) RUS | Dmitri Malyaka | 4 | 0 | 3+1 | 0 | 0 | 0 | 0 | 0 |
| 77 | DF | (Ukraine) UKR | Andriy Proshyn | 5 | 0 | 4 | 0 | 0 | 0 | 1 | 0 |
| 90 | MF | (Russia) RUS | Artyom Kulesha | 3 | 0 | 1+2 | 0 | 0 | 0 | 0 | 0 |
| 99 | MF | (Russia) RUS | Oleg Ivanov | 17 | 1 | 7+7 | 0 | 0 | 0 | 2+1 | 1 |

=== Goal scorers ===
| Place | Position | Nation | Number | Name | Premier League | Relegation Play-off | 2010-11 Russian Cup | 2011-12 Russian Cup | Total |
|---|---|---|---|---|---|---|---|---|---|
| 1 | FW | (Russia) | 9 | Roman Adamov | 11 | 2 | 0 | 0 | 13 |
| 2 | FW | (Argentina) | 19 | Héctor Bracamonte | 6 | 0 | 0 | 1 | 7 |
| 3 | FW | (Russia) | 10 | Dmitri Kirichenko | 5 | 1 | 0 | 0 | 6 |
| 4 | FW | (Russia) | 17 | Maksim Grigoryev | 2 | 0 | 1 | 2 | 5 |
| 5 | MF | (Belarus) | 2 | Timofei Kalachev | 4 | 0 | 0 | 0 | 4 |
| 5 | MF | (Moldova) | 84 | Alexandru Gațcan | 4 | 0 | 0 | 0 | 4 |
| 5 | MF | (Bosnia and Herzegovina) | 11 | Dragan Blatnjak | 3 | 0 | 1 | 0 | 4 |
| 5 | MF | (Romania) | 81 | Răzvan Cociș | 3 | 1 | 0 | 0 | 4 |
| 9 | DF | (Slovakia) | 3 | Kornel Saláta | 2 | 0 | 0 | 1 | 3 |
| 10 | FW | (Czech Republic) | 18 | Michal Papadopulos | 1 | 0 | 0 | 0 | 1 |
| 10 | DF | (Russia) | 14 | Anri Khagush | 1 | 0 | 0 | 0 | 1 |
| 10 | DF | (Nigeria) | 4 | Isaac Okoronkwo | 1 | 0 | 0 | 0 | 1 |
| 10 | DF | (Russia) | 28 | Igor Smolnikov | 1 | 0 | 0 | 0 | 1 |
| 10 | DF | (Estonia) | 16 | Dmitri Kruglov | 1 | 0 | 0 | 0 | 1 |
| 10 | MF | (Russia) | 99 | Oleg Ivanov | 0 | 0 | 0 | 1 | 1 |
| | | | | TOTALS | 44 | 4 | 2 | 5 | 55 |

=== Clean sheets ===
| Place | Position | Nation | Number | Name | Premier League | Relegation Play-off | 2010-11 Russian Cup | 2011-12 Russian Cup | Total |
|---|---|---|---|---|---|---|---|---|---|
| 1 | GK | (Croatia) | 21 | Stipe Pletikosa | 5 | 2 | 0 | 0 | 7 |
| 2 | GK | (Russia) | 30 | Anton Kochenkov | 3.5 | 0 | 1 | 0 | 4.5 |
| 3 | GK | (Serbia) | 22 | Dejan Radić | 1.5 | 0 | 0 | 0 | 1.5 |
| 4 | GK | (Russia) | 97 | Sergei Pesyakov | 0 | 0 | 0 | 1 | 1 |
| TOTALS | | | | | 10 | 2 | 1 | 1 | 14 |

Radić and Kochenkov both played in Rostov's 1-0 win over Terek Grozny on 22 April 2011

=== Disciplinary record ===
| Number | Nation | Position | Name | Premier League | | Relegation Play-off | | 2010-11 Russian Cup | | 2011-12 Russian Cup | | Total | |
| Number | Nation | Position | Name | Yellow card | Red card | Yellow card | Red card | Yellow card | Red card | Yellow card | Red card | Yellow card | Red card |
| 2 | (Belarus) | MF | Timofei Kalachev | 7 | 1 | 0 | 0 | 1 | 0 | 1 | 0 | 9 | 1 |
| 3 | (Slovakia) | DF | Kornel Saláta | 5 | 1 | 0 | 0 | 0 | 0 | 0 | 0 | 5 | 1 |
| 4 | (Nigeria) | DF | Isaac Okoronkwo | 10 | 1 | 0 | 0 | 0 | 0 | 1 | 0 | 11 | 1 |
| 6 | (Argentina) | MF | Oscar Ahumada | 1 | 0 | 0 | 0 | 0 | 0 | 0 | 0 | 1 | 0 |
| 7 | (Brazil) | MF | Élson | 3 | 0 | 0 | 0 | 0 | 0 | 0 | 0 | 3 | 0 |
| 9 | (Russia) | FW | Roman Adamov | 11 | 0 | 0 | 0 | 1 | 0 | 0 | 0 | 12 | 0 |
| 10 | (Russia) | FW | Dmitri Kirichenko | 1 | 0 | 0 | 0 | 0 | 0 | 0 | 0 | 1 | 0 |
| 11 | (Bosnia and Herzegovina) | MF | Dragan Blatnjak | 0 | 0 | 0 | 0 | 1 | 0 | 0 | 0 | 1 | 0 |
| 16 | (Estonia) | DF | Dmitri Kruglov | 1 | 0 | 0 | 0 | 0 | 0 | 0 | 0 | 1 | 0 |
| 17 | (Russia) | FW | Maksim Grigoryev | 3 | 0 | 0 | 0 | 1 | 0 | 0 | 0 | 4 | 0 |
| 19 | (Argentina) | FW | Héctor Bracamonte | 6 | 0 | 0 | 0 | 0 | 0 | 2 | 0 | 8 | 0 |
| 21 | (Croatia) | GK | Stipe Pletikosa | 2 | 0 | 0 | 0 | 0 | 0 | 0 | 0 | 2 | 0 |
| 23 | (Russia) | FW | Dmitry Poloz | 1 | 0 | 0 | 0 | 0 | 0 | 0 | 0 | 1 | 0 |
| 24 | (Russia) | DF | Denis Kolodin | 5 | 1 | 0 | 0 | 0 | 0 | 0 | 0 | 5 | 1 |
| 28 | (Russia) | DF | Igor Smolnikov | 7 | 1 | 1 | 0 | 0 | 0 | 0 | 0 | 8 | 1 |
| 47 | (Russia) | MF | Khoren Bayramyan | 2 | 0 | 0 | 0 | 0 | 0 | 0 | 0 | 2 | 0 |
| 72 | (Russia) | DF | Valentin Filatov | 3 | 0 | 0 | 0 | 0 | 0 | 0 | 0 | 3 | 0 |
| 81 | (Romania) | MF | Răzvan Cociș | 5 | 0 | 0 | 0 | 0 | 0 | 0 | 0 | 5 | 0 |
| 84 | (Moldova) | MF | Alexandru Gațcan | 16 | 2 | 1 | 0 | 0 | 0 | 0 | 0 | 17 | 2 |
| 88 | (Lithuania) | MF | Edgaras Česnauskis | 7 | 0 | 0 | 0 | 2 | 1 | 0 | 0 | 9 | 1 |
| 89 | (Russia) | DF | Vitali Dyakov | 0 | 0 | 1 | 0 | 0 | 0 | 0 | 0 | 1 | 0 |
| 92 | (Russia) | MF | Roman Yemelyanov | 5 | 1 | 0 | 0 | 0 | 0 | 1 | 0 | 6 | 1 |
Players away on loan:
| 49 | (Russia) | MF | Nikita Vasilyev | 1 | 0 | 0 | 0 | 0 | 0 | 0 | 0 | 1 | 0 |
Players who left Rostov during the season:
| 5 | (Russia) | DF | Aleksandr Khokhlov | 4 | 0 | 0 | 0 | 0 | 0 | 0 | 0 | 4 | 0 |
| 8 | (Bulgaria) | MF | Chavdar Yankov | 4 | 1 | 0 | 0 | 1 | 0 | 1 | 0 | 2 | 0 |
| 14 | (Russia) | DF | Anri Khagush | 16 | 1 | 0 | 0 | 0 | 0 | 1 | 0 | 17 | 1 |
| 20 | (Tunisia) | DF | Anis Boussaïdi | 2 | 1 | 0 | 0 | 0 | 0 | 0 | 0 | 2 | 1 |
| 30 | (Russia) | GK | Anton Kochenkov | 1 | 0 | 0 | 0 | 0 | 0 | 0 | 0 | 1 | 0 |
| 33 | (Russia) | MF | Dmitri Malyaka | 3 | 0 | 0 | 0 | 0 | 0 | 0 | 0 | 3 | 0 |
| 77 | (Ukraine) | DF | Andriy Proshyn | 0 | 1 | 0 | 0 | 1 | 0 | 0 | 0 | 1 | 1 |
| 99 | (Russia) | MF | Oleg Ivanov | 4 | 0 | 0 | 0 | 1 | 0 | 0 | 0 | 5 | 0 |
| | | | TOTALS | 136 | 12 | 3 | 0 | 9 | 1 | 7 | 0 | 155 | 13 |
