= Artyom Madilov =

Russian footballer

Personal information
- Full name: Artyom Sergeyevich Madilov
- Date of birth: 1 April 1985 (age 41)
- Place of birth: Moscow, Russian SFSR
- Height: 1.86 m (6 ft 1 in)
- Position: Defender

Youth career
- FShM-Torpedo Moscow

Senior career*
Years	Team	Apps	(Gls)
2001–2004	FC Torpedo Moscow	0	(0)
2005	FC Dynamo Barnaul	30	(1)
2006	FC Ural Yekaterinburg	0	(0)
2007–2008	FC Anzhi Makhachkala	11	(0)
2009	FC Torpedo Moscow (amateur)		
2010	FC Torpedo Moscow	23	(2)
2011–2012	FC Istra	25	(0)
- * Club domestic league appearances and goals

Artyom Sergeyevich Madilov (Russian: Артём Серге́евич Мадилов; born 1 April 1985) is a former Russian professional football player.

== Club career ==
He made his senior debut for FC Torpedo Moscow on 20 August 2003 in a Russian Premier League Cup game against FC Zenit Saint Petersburg.

He made his Russian Football National League debut for FC Anzhi Makhachkala on 2 September 2007 in a game against FC Zvezda Irkutsk. He also played in the FNL for Anzhi in 2008.

== Personal life ==
His younger brother Ilya Madilov is also a professional footballer.
