= Maksim Grigoryev (footballer, born 1990) =

Russian footballer

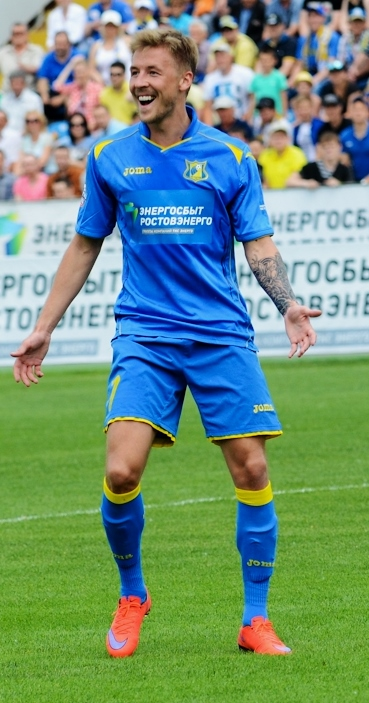
- Grigoryev with FC Rostov in 2015

Personal information
- Full name: Maksim Sergeyevich Grigoryev
- Date of birth: 6 July 1990 (age 36)
- Place of birth: Lipetsk, Soviet Union (now Russia)
- Height: 1.88 m (6 ft 2 in)
- Position: Midfielder

Youth career
- Metallurg Lipetsk
- 2007–2008: Spartak Moscow

Senior career*
| Years | Team | Apps | (Gls) |
| 2009–2010 | Spartak Moscow | 3 | (0) |
| 2011 | MITOS Novocherkassk | 0 | (0) |
| 2011 | → Rostov (loan) | 29 | (2) |
| 2012–2016 | Lokomotiv Moscow | 38 | (2) |
| 2014–2015 | → Rostov (loan) | 22 | (5) |
| 2016–2017 | Rostov | 6 | (0) |
| 2017 | → Orenburg (loan) | 10 | (0) |
| 2017 | Ural Yekaterinburg | 7 | (0) |
| 2018 | Baltika Kaliningrad | 34 | (4) |
| 2019 | Avangard Kursk | 22 | (2) |
| 2020 | Fakel Voronezh | 18 | (0) |
| 2022 | SKA Rostov-on-Don | 6 | (1) |
| 2022–2024 | Metallurg Lipetsk | 46 | (7) |

International career
| 2011–2013 | Russia U21 | 8 | (1) |
| 2012–2014 | Russia | 4 | (0) |
- * Club domestic league appearances and goals as of 8 June 2024

Maksim Sergeyevich Grigoryev (Russian: Максим Сергеевич Григорьев; born 6 July 1990) is a Russian professional footballer.

== Club career ==
=== Spartak ===
Grigoryev made his debut in the Russian Premier League on 21 March 2009 in a game against Kuban Krasnodar. He played two games in the 2008–09 UEFA Cup for FC Spartak Moscow against Dinamo Zagreb and Tottenham.

=== Rostov ===
In early 2011, his contract with Spartak Moscow expired, and he decided to switch to Rostov. According to Russian football regulations at the time, when a player under 23 years of age who was raised in the club system transferred to a different club after his contract expired, his old club was due compensation from his new club. If the new club plays on the third level (Russian Second League), the compensation is the player's previous 5 years' salary multiplied by 1, if his new club is in the Russian First League, it is multiplied by 2 and if it is a Russian Premier League club, it is multiplied by 3. Grigoryev and two other Spartak alumni, Dmitri Malyaka and Yevgeni Filippov, signed with a Russian Second League team MITOS Novocherkassk who immediately loaned them to the Russian Premier League team Rostov. Spartak lodged a complaint with the Russian Football Union, claiming this was not a fair transfer as the only reason for it was to lower the compensation that Rostov was due to pay Spartak. After the protest was declined on 29 March 2011, Grigoryev was registered for Rostov and scored a goal on his debut against Lokomotiv Moscow on 2 April 2011. Lokomotiv's president, Olga Smorodskaya, filed a complaint with the Russian Football Union and Premier League, claiming Grigoryev was not eligible to be registered and play for Rostov. Lokomotiv's protest was eventually denied.

=== Lokomotiv ===
In January 2012, Grigoryev signed a three-and-a-half-year deal with Lokomotiv Moscow.

=== Rostov (third spell) ===
Grigoryev left Rostov by mutual consent on 17 July 2017.

== International career ==
Grigoryev made his debut for Russia under-21 football team against Poland under-21 team on 6 September 2011.

He was called up by Fabio Capello to the national team for the 2014 FIFA World Cup qualifiers against Portugal and against Azerbaijan in October 2012.

He made his debut for the main squad in a friendly against the United States on 14 November 2012.

== Career statistics ==
As of match played 8 June 2024

| Club | Season | League | | | Russian Cup | | Continental | | Other | | Total | |
| Club | Season | Division | Apps | Goals | Apps | Goals | Apps | Goals | Apps | Goals | Apps | Goals |
|---|---|---|---|---|---|---|---|---|---|---|---|---|
| Spartak Moscow | 2008 | Russian Premier League | 0 | 0 | 0 | 0 | 2 (Note: Appearances in UEFA Cup) | 0 | – | | 2 | 0 |
| Spartak Moscow | 2009 | Russian Premier League | 3 | 0 | 1 | 0 | – | | – | | 4 | 0 |
| Spartak Moscow | 2010 | Russian Premier League | 0 | 0 | 0 | 0 | – | | – | | 0 | 0 |
| Spartak Moscow | Total | | 3 | 0 | 1 | 0 | 2 | 0 | 0 | 0 | 6 | 0 |
| Rostov (loan) | 2011–12 | Russian Premier League | 29 | 2 | 4 | 3 | – | | – | | 33 | 5 |
| Lokomotiv Moscow | 2011–12 | Russian Premier League | 3 | 0 | 0 | 0 | 0 | 0 | – | | 3 | 0 |
| Lokomotiv Moscow | 2012–13 | Russian Premier League | 20 | 2 | 0 | 0 | – | | – | | 20 | 2 |
| Lokomotiv Moscow | 2013–14 | Russian Premier League | 10 | 0 | 1 | 0 | – | | – | | 11 | 0 |
| Lokomotiv Moscow | 2014–15 | Russian Premier League | 0 | 0 | – | | – | | – | | 0 | 0 |
| Lokomotiv Moscow | 2015–16 | Russian Premier League | 5 | 0 | 2 | 0 | 3 (Note: Appearances in UEFA Europa League) | 0 | 1 (Note: Appearance in Russian Super Cup) | 0 | 11 | 0 |
| Lokomotiv Moscow | 2016–17 | Russian Premier League | 0 | 0 | – | | – | | – | | 0 | 0 |
| Lokomotiv Moscow | Total | | 38 | 2 | 3 | 0 | 3 | 0 | 1 | 0 | 45 | 2 |
| Rostov (loan) | 2014–15 | Russian Premier League | 22 | 5 | 1 | 0 | 2 | 0 | 2 (Note: Appearances in Russian Premier League relegation play-offs) | 0 | 27 | 5 |
| Rostov | 2016–17 | Russian Premier League | 6 | 0 | 0 | 0 | 1 (Note: Appearance in UEFA Champions League) | 0 | – | | 7 | 0 |
| Rostov | 2017–18 | Russian Premier League | 0 | 0 | – | | – | | – | | 0 | 0 |
| Rostov | Total | | 6 | 0 | 0 | 0 | 1 | 0 | 0 | 0 | 7 | 0 |
| Orenburg (loan) | 2016–17 | Russian Premier League | 10 | 0 | – | | – | | 0 | 0 | 10 | 0 |
| Ural Yekaterinburg | 2017–18 | Russian Premier League | 7 | 0 | – | | – | | – | | 7 | 0 |
| Baltika Kaliningrad | 2017–18 | Russian First League | 12 | 0 | – | | – | | – | | 12 | 0 |
| Baltika Kaliningrad | 2018–19 | Russian First League | 22 | 4 | 2 | 0 | – | | – | | 24 | 4 |
| Baltika Kaliningrad | Total | | 34 | 4 | 2 | 0 | 0 | 0 | 0 | 0 | 36 | 4 |
| Avangard Kursk | 2018–19 | Russian First League | 2 | 1 | – | | – | | 5 (Note: Appearances in FNL Cup) | 2 | 7 | 3 |
| Avangard Kursk | 2019–20 | Russian First League | 20 | 1 | 1 | 0 | – | | – | | 21 | 1 |
| Avangard Kursk | Total | | 22 | 2 | 1 | 0 | 0 | 0 | 5 | 2 | 28 | 4 |
| Fakel Voronezh | 2019–20 | Russian First League | 2 | 0 | – | | – | | 4 | 1 | 6 | 1 |
| Fakel Voronezh | 2020–21 | Russian First League | 16 | 0 | 1 | 0 | – | | – | | 17 | 0 |
| Fakel Voronezh | Total | | 18 | 0 | 1 | 0 | 0 | 0 | 4 | 1 | 23 | 1 |
| SKA Rostov-on-Don | 2021–22 | Russian Second League | 6 | 1 | – | | – | | – | | 6 | 1 |
| Metallurg Lipetsk | 2022–23 | Russian Second League | 27 | 7 | 1 | 0 | – | | – | | 28 | 7 |
| Metallurg Lipetsk | 2023–24 | Russian Second League A | 19 | 0 | 0 | 0 | – | | – | | 19 | 0 |
| Metallurg Lipetsk | Total | | 46 | 7 | 1 | 0 | 0 | 0 | 0 | 0 | 47 | 7 |
| Career total | | | 241 | 23 | 14 | 3 | 8 | 0 | 12 | 3 | 275 | 29 |
