= Aleksei Sugak =

Russian footballer

Personal information
- Full name: Aleksei Sergeyevich Sugak
- Date of birth: 27 February 1990 (age 36)
- Place of birth: Azov, Rostov Oblast, Russian SFSR
- Height: 1.86 m (6 ft 1 in)
- Position: Forward

Youth career
- 2007–2009: Rostov

Senior career*
Years	Team	Apps	(Gls)
2009–2011	Rostov	2	(0)
2011	→ Neman Grodno (loan)	10	(0)
2012	SKA Rostov-on-Don	7	(0)
2012–2013	Taganrog	15	(9)
2013	Olimpia Volgograd	5	(1)
2014	Taganrog	21	(9)
2015	Khimki	6	(1)
2015–2016	MITOS Novocherkassk	20	(2)
- * Club domestic league appearances and goals

Aleksei Sergeyevich Sugak (Russian: Алексей Серге́евич Сугак; born 27 February 1990) is a Russian former professional football player.

== Club career ==
He made his Russian Premier League debut on 13 March 2010 for FC Rostov in a game against FC Tom Tomsk.
