= Facundo Quiroga (footballer, born 1978) =

Argentine footballer

Personal information
- Full name: Facundo Hernán Quiroga
- Date of birth: 10 January 1978 (age 48)
- Place of birth: San Luis, Argentina
- Height: 1.79 m (5 ft 10 in)
- Position: Defender

Senior career*
Years	Team	Apps	(Gls)
1997–1998	Newell's Old Boys	22	(1)
1998–2004	Sporting CP	73	(2)
2000–2001	→ Napoli (loan)	28	(0)
2004–2008	VfL Wolfsburg	90	(1)
2008–2010	River Plate	25	(1)
2010–2011	Huracán	31	(1)
2011–2013	All Boys	54	(0)
Total		323	(6)

International career
2002–2004	Argentina	16	(0)
- * Club domestic league appearances and goals

Facundo Hernán Quiroga (born 10 January 1978) is an Argentine retired professional footballer. Mainly a central defender, he could also play as a right back.

== Club career ==
Born in San Luis, Quiroga began his career at Newell's Old Boys in the Argentine Primera División in 1997. The following year he was signed by Sporting CP, where he spent six years with a season-long loan at Italian side S.S.C. Napoli in 2000–01. He was relatively important in the Lisbon team's 2000 conquest of the Primeira Liga championship, playing alongside another Newell's youth graduate Aldo Duscher who also joined in 1998; at Napoli he played with former Sporting teammate Luis Vidigal, as they were eventually relegated from Serie A.

In 2004, Quiroga moved to VfL Wolfsburg, a club that acquired a number of Argentine players in that timeframe (Oscar Ahumada, Andrés D'Alessandro, Diego Klimowicz and Juan Carlos Menseguez). A regular in the lineups from 2004 to 2007, he only appeared in 12 Bundesliga matches in his last year, subsequently returning to Argentina and joining Club Atlético River Plate.

In 2010, the 32-year-old Quiroga signed for Club Atlético Huracán. He retired three seasons later, with All Boys also in his country's top division.

== International career ==
Quiroga earned 16 caps for the Argentina national team, going on to represent the country at the 2004 Copa América. His debut came on 17 April 2002 in a friendly win in Germany (1–0), playing the entire match and being booked; he was finally overlooked for the squad at that year's FIFA World Cup.

== Honours ==
Sporting

- Primeira Liga: 1999–2000, 2001–02
- Taça de Portugal: 2001–02
