= Nikita Vasilyev (footballer, born 1992) =

Russian footballer

Personal information
- Full name: Nikita Valeryevich Vasilyev
- Date of birth: 22 March 1992 (age 34)
- Place of birth: Pskov, Russia
- Height: 1.91 m (6 ft 3 in)
- Positions: Defender; midfielder

Youth career
- 2004–2009: FC Spartak Moscow

Senior career*
Years	Team	Apps	(Gls)
2010–2014	FC Rostov	3	(0)
2012	→ FC Chernomorets Novorossiysk (loan)	5	(0)
2013–2014	→ FC Torpedo Moscow (loan)	3	(0)
2014	FC Kaluga	8	(0)
2015	FC MITOS Novocherkassk	10	(0)
2015	FC Volga-Olimpiyets Nizhny Novgorod	17	(4)
2016	FC Zenit-Izhevsk	8	(0)
2016–2017	FC SKA Rostov-on-Don	38	(2)
2018	FC Kaluga	9	(0)
2018–2019	FC Kubanskaya Korona Shevchenko		
2019	FC Sevastopol		
2019–2020	FC Krymteplytsia Molodizhne		
2020	FC SKA Rostov-on-Don	12	(1)
2021	FC Krymteplytsia Molodizhne		
2021	FC Gvardeyets Skvortsovo		
2022–2023	FC Zorkiy Krasnogorsk	2	(0)

International career
2010	Russia U-18	2	(0)
2011	Russia U-19	4	(0)
2012	Russia U-21	4	(1)
- * Club domestic league appearances and goals

Nikita Valeryevich Vasilyev (Russian: Никита Валерьевич Васильев; born 22 March 1992) is a Russian former professional football player.

== Club career ==
He made his Russian Premier League debut for FC Rostov on 22 June 2011 in a game against FC Tom Tomsk.
