= Lyubomir Kantonistov =

Russian footballer

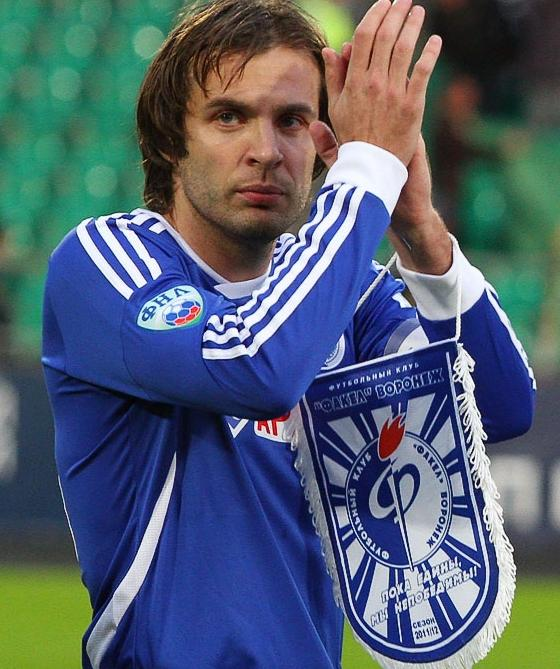
- Kantonistov with Fakel in 2011

Personal information
- Full name: Lyubomir Danilovich Kantonistov
- Date of birth: 11 August 1978 (age 48)
- Place of birth: Moscow, Russian SFSR
- Height: 1.80 m (5 ft 11 in)
- Position: Midfielder

Team information
- Current team: Kuban Krasnodar (general director)

Youth career
- 1995–1996: Lokomotiv Moscow

Senior career*
Years	Team	Apps	(Gls)
1997	Lokomotiv Moscow	1	(0)
1998	Naftekhimik Nizhnekamsk	19	(2)
1999	Zhemchuzhina Sochi	13	(0)
2000	Metallurg Krasnoyarsk	12	(1)
2000	Alania Vladikavkaz	5	(0)
2001	Lokomotiv N.Novgorod	13	(0)
2001–2002	Olimpija Ljubljana	7	(0)
2002–2005	Kuban Krasnodar	122	(30)
2006–2008	Torpedo Moscow	58	(3)
2009	MVD Rossii Moscow	19	(4)
2009	FC Krasnodar	11	(0)
2010	Dynamo St. Petersburg	34	(0)
2011	Baltika Kaliningrad	17	(3)
2011–2013	Fakel Voronezh	44	(12)
Total		375	(55)

International career
2004	Russia	1	(0)

Managerial career
- 2023–: Kuban Krasnodar (general director)
- * Club domestic league appearances and goals

Lyubomir Danilovich Kantonistov (Russian: Любомир Данилович Кантонистов; born 11 August 1978) is a Russian football official and a former player. He is the general director of Kuban Krasnodar.

He played with FC Lokomotiv Moscow, FC Kuban Krasnodar and FC Torpedo Moscow in the Russian Premier League, and with Olimpija Ljubljana in the Slovenian First League.

== International career ==
Kantonistov played his only game for Russia on 9 October 2004 in the 2006 FIFA World Cup qualifier against Luxembourg.
