= Chavdar Yankov =

Bulgarian footballer

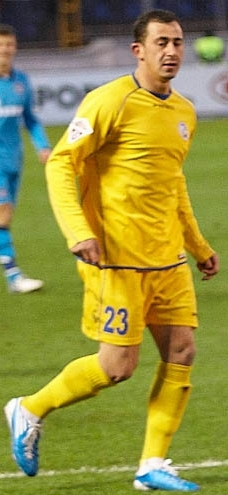
- Yankov with Rostov in 2010

Personal information
- Full name: Chavdar Kirilov Yankov
- Date of birth: 29 March 1984 (age 42)
- Place of birth: Sofia, Bulgaria
- Height: 1.76 m (5 ft 9 in)
- Position: Midfielder

Senior career*
Years	Team	Apps	(Gls)
2001–2005	Slavia Sofia	71	(12)
2005–2009	Hannover 96	66	(6)
2009	→ MSV Duisburg (loan)	12	(1)
2010–2012	Metalurh Donetsk	18	(0)
2010–2011	→ Rostov (loan)	25	(2)
2012–2014	Slavia Sofia	45	(6)
Total		235	(27)

International career
2003–2011	Bulgaria	48	(5)
- * Club domestic league appearances and goals

Chavdar Yankov (Bulgarian: Чавдар Янков; born 29 March 1984) is a Bulgarian retired footballer. He played as a midfielder.

== Club career ==
Yankov began his football career as a youth at Slavia Sofia. He made his debut in professional football on 7 September 2001, in a 0–1 loss against Lokomotiv Sofia. In the 2001–02 season, Yankov played in seven matches for Slavia. He started to make his name two years later when he scored six goals in 30 league games and was called to the Bulgarian national team by then coach Hristo Stoichkov.

In summer 2005, Yankov moved to German Bundesliga side Hannover 96, initially on a loan, but made permanent in summer 2007 for a fee of around €1.30 million. In summer 2009, he was loaned to MSV Duisburg.

On 8 January 2010, Yankov joined Ukrainian Premier League club Metalurh Donetsk on a two-and-a-half-year deal. On 13 August 2010, Yankov was loaned out to Russian Premier League club FC Rostov.

In July 2012, Yankov signed as a free agent for his boyhood club Slavia Sofia on a one-year contract.

Yankov retired in 2014 at the age of 30, due to an injury.

== International career ==
Yankov made his debut for Bulgaria in 2004. On 13 October 2004, he scored his first goal for Bulgaria in a 4–1 win against Malta as part of the World Cup 2006 qualification campaign. On 12 October 2010, in the absence of Stilian Petrov, he captained the side for the first time in the 2–0 win against Saudi Arabia in a friendly match.

From 2004 to 2011, Yankov made a total of 48 appearances for his country, scoring 5 goals.

=== International goals ===
Chavdar Yankov: International Goals
#	Date	Venue	Opponent	Score	Result	Competition
1.	13 October 2004	Sofia, Bulgaria	Malta	4–1	4–1	World Cup 2006 Qual.
2.	12 November 2005	Sofia, Bulgaria	Georgia	1–0	6–2	Friendly
3.	12 November 2005	Sofia, Bulgaria	Georgia	2–0	6–2	Friendly
4.	6 February 2007	Larnaca, Cyprus	Latvia	2–0	Win	Friendly
5.	6 June 2007	Sofia, Bulgaria	Belarus	2–1	2–1	UEFA Euro 2008 Qual.
