= Dmitri Malyaka =

Russian footballer

Personal information
- Full name: Dmitri Sergeyevich Malyaka
- Date of birth: 15 January 1990 (age 36)
- Place of birth: Omsk, Russian SFSR
- Height: 1.83 m (6 ft 0 in)
- Position: Midfielder

Youth career
- 2006–2008: Spartak Moscow

Senior career*
Years	Team	Apps	(Gls)
2007–2010	Spartak Moscow	0	(0)
2011	MITOS Novocherkassk	0	(0)
2011	→ Rostov (loan)	4	(0)
2012	Tom Tomsk	4	(0)
2012–2013	Rostov	2	(0)
2013	→ Angusht Nazran (loan)	8	(0)
2014	Yenisey Krasnoyarsk	3	(0)
2014–2016	Volga Nizhny Novgorod	50	(1)
2016–2017	Neftekhimik Nizhnekamsk	35	(0)
2017–2018	Luch-Energiya Vladivostok	28	(1)
2018	Ararat Yerevan	8	(1)
2019	Gomel	10	(0)
2020	Pyunik	3	(0)

International career
2009	Russia U-19	5	(1)
2010	Russia U-20	3	(1)
2011	Russia U-21	1	(0)
2012	Russia B	1	(0)
2019	Artsakh	5	(2)
- * Club domestic league appearances and goals

Dmitri Sergeyevich Malyaka (Russian: Дмитрий Серге́евич Маляка; born 15 January 1990) is a Russian former football player.

== Career ==
=== Club ===
Malyaka made his debut in the Russian Premier League on 10 April 2011 for FC Rostov in a game against FC Volga Nizhny Novgorod.

On 2 October 2018, Malyaka was one of five players to leave Ararat Yerevan.

On 25 February 2020, FC Pyunik announced the signing of Malyaka, with Malyaka leaving the club on 2 July 2020 after his contract had expired.

=== International ===
Malyaka represented Artsakh at the 2019 CONIFA European Football Cup.
