= Kornel Saláta =

Slovak footballer (born 1985)

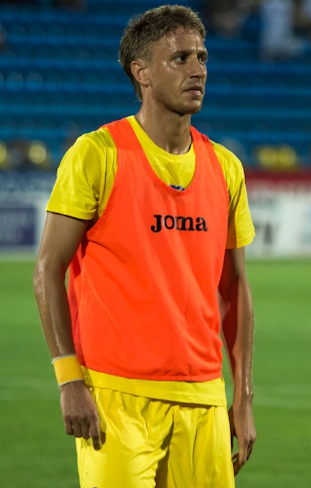
- Saláta with FC Rostov in 2012

Personal information
- Date of birth: 24 January 1985 (age 41)
- Place of birth: Kamenica nad Hronom, Czechoslovakia
- Height: 1.91 m (6 ft 3 in)
- Position: Centre-back

Team information
- Current team: MŠO Štúrovo

Youth career
- VTJ Sokol Kamenica nad Hronom
- FK Štúrovo

Senior career*
Years	Team	Apps	(Gls)
2005–2006	Matador Púchov	29	(4)
2006–2009	Artmedia Petržalka	49	(9)
2007	→ Dukla Banská Bystrica (loan)	17	(4)
2009–2010	Slovan Bratislava	47	(5)
2011–2014	Rostov	59	(4)
2013–2014	→ Tom Tomsk (loan)	7	(0)
2014–2018	Slovan Bratislava	94	(7)
2014	→ Dunajská Streda (loan)	10	(2)
2019	Szombathelyi Haladás	7	(0)
2019–2023	Komárno	53	(3)
2023–2025	MŠO Štúrovo		
2025–2026	SK Svodín		
2026–	MŠO Štúrovo		

International career^{‡}
2008–2016	Slovakia	40	(2)
- * Club domestic league appearances and goals as of 23 May 2023 ‡ National team caps and goals as of 15 December 2018

Kornel Saláta (Slovak pronunciation: [ˈkɔrnel ˈsalaːta]; Hungarian: Saláta Kornél; born 24 January 1985) is a Slovak professional football who plays as a centre-back for MŠO Štúrovo.

== Club career ==
Saláta made his Corgoň Liga debut in the 2005–06 season for Matador Púchov. After season Púchov relegated to the Slovak First League and Saláta signed for Artmedia Petržalka. There he won the Corgoň Liga and the Slovak Cup in the 2007–08 season. In summer 2009, he moved to Slovan Bratislava, playing first match in the 2009 Slovak Super Cup. In January 2011, he signed four-year contract for Russian club Rostov for €1 million as one of the best Corgoň Liga defenders.

Saláta left Rostov in August 2014.

== International career ==
Saláta made his national team debut against Switzerland on 24 May 2008. He participated at the 2010 FIFA World Cup, playing 83 minutes in second group match against Paraguay.

== Personal life ==
Saláta hails ethnically from the ethnic Hungarian minority in Slovakia. He speaks both Slovak and Hungarian fluently, also with knowledge of Russian and English.

== Career statistics ==
Scores and results list Slovakia's goal tally first, score column indicates score after each Saláta goal.

List of international goals scored by Kornel Saláta
No.	Date	Venue	Opponent	Score	Result	Competition
1	15 October 2013	Skonto Stadium, Riga, Latvia	Latvia	2–0	2–2	2014 FIFA World Cup qualification
2	14 June 2015	Štadión pod Dubňom, Žilina, Slovakia	North Macedonia	1–0	2–1	Euro 2016 qualifier

== Honours ==
Artmedia

- Corgoň Liga: 2007–08
- Slovak Cup: 2007–08

Slovan

- Slovak Cup: 2009–10
- Slovak Super Cup: 2009
