= Aleksandr Khokhlov =

Russian footballer

Personal information
- Full name: Aleksandr Valeryevich Khokhlov
- Date of birth: 30 September 1988 (age 38)
- Place of birth: Russia
- Height: 1.80 m (5 ft 11 in)
- Positions: Left back; left midfielder

Senior career*
| Years | Team | Apps | (Gls) |
| 2006–2010 | FC Zenit St. Petersburg | 0 | (0) |
| 2009 | → FC Kuban Krasnodar (loan) | 6 | (0) |
| 2010 | → PFC Spartak Nalchik (loan) | 1 | (0) |
| 2011 | FC Rostov | 10 | (0) |
| 2014–2015 | FC Saturn Ramenskoye | 3 | (0) |
- * Club domestic league appearances and goals

Aleksandr Valeryevich Khokhlov (Russian: Александр Валерьевич Хохлов; born 30 September 1988) is a former Russian football player.

== Club career ==
He made his debut in the Russian Premier League on 30 May 2009 in a game against FC Zenit St. Petersburg.

He played 1 game for FC Zenit St. Petersburg in the Russian Cup.
