= Fyodor Dvornikov =

Russian football player

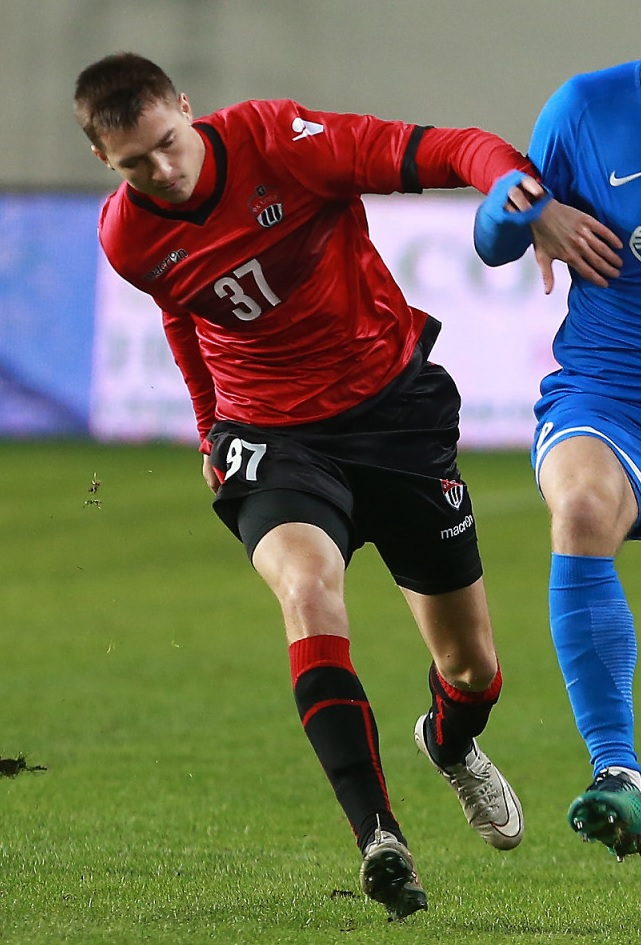
- Dvornikov with FC Khimki in 2016

Personal information
- Full name: Fyodor Andreyevich Dvornikov
- Date of birth: 28 December 1992 (age 33)
- Place of birth: Moscow, Russia
- Height: 1.92 m (6 ft 4 in)
- Position: Forward

Youth career
- SDYuShOR-44 Krasnogvardeyets Moscow

Senior career*
Years	Team	Apps	(Gls)
2011–2012	FC Rostov	0	(0)
2012	FC Sparta Shchyolkovo		
2013	FC Olimpik Mytishchi		
2014–2015	FC Biolog-Novokubansk	17	(5)
2015–2017	FC Khimki	58	(11)
2018	FC Dynamo Saint Petersburg	5	(0)
2018–2019	FC Sokol Saratov	26	(13)
2019–2020	FC SKA Rostov-on-Don	17	(4)
2020	FC Yenisey Krasnoyarsk	10	(1)
2021	FC Murom	9	(1)
2021–2022	FC Zenit-Izhevsk	23	(4)
- * Club domestic league appearances and goals

Fyodor Andreyevich Dvornikov (Russian: Фёдор Андреевич Дворников; born 28 December 1992) is a Russian former football player.

== Club career ==
He made his professional debut in the Russian Professional Football League for FC Biolog-Novokubansk on 12 August 2014 in a game against FC Chernomorets Novorossiysk.

He made his Russian Football National League debut for FC Khimki on 17 August 2016 in a game against FC Fakel Voronezh.
