= Ilya Madilov =

Russian footballer

Personal information
- Full name: Ilya Sergeyevich Madilov
- Date of birth: 18 June 1988 (age 38)
- Height: 1.89 m (6 ft 2 1/2 in)
- Position: Goalkeeper

Senior career*
Years	Team	Apps	(Gls)
2004–2008	FC Torpedo Moscow	9	(0)
2009	FC Istra	31	(0)
2010	FC Torpedo Moscow	13	(0)
2011	FC Istra	15	(0)
2011–2012	FC Rostov	0	(0)
2013	FC Fakel Voronezh	10	(0)
- * Club domestic league appearances and goals

Ilya Sergeyevich Madilov (Russian: Илья Серге́евич Мадилов; born 18 June 1988) is a former Russian professional football player.

== Club career ==
He played two seasons in the Russian Football National League for FC Torpedo Moscow.

== Personal life ==
His older brother Artyom Madilov is also a professional footballer.
