= Roman Adamov =

Russian footballer (born 1982)

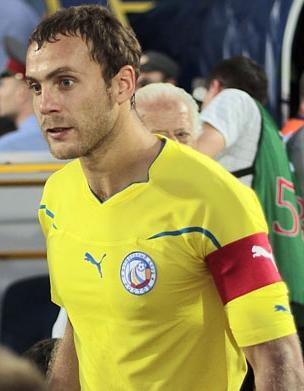
- Adamov in 2011

Personal information
- Full name: Roman Stanislavovich Adamov
- Date of birth: 21 June 1982 (age 44)
- Place of birth: Belaya Kalitva, Russian SFSR, Soviet Union
- Height: 1.87 m (6 ft 1 1/2 in)
- Position: Striker

Team information
- Current team: CSKA Moscow (assistant coach)

Senior career*
Years	Team	Apps	(Gls)
1999–2000	Olimpia Volgograd	19	(6)
2000	→ Shakhtar Donetsk (loan)	0	(0)
2000	→ Shakhtar-2 Donetsk (loan)	12	(1)
2001–2004	FC Rostov	62	(11)
2004–2005	Terek Grozny	30	(9)
2006–2008	FC Moscow	63	(24)
2008–2012	Rubin Kazan	26	(3)
2009	→ Krylia Sovetov Samara (loan)	13	(5)
2010–2012	→ FC Rostov (loan)	68	(21)
2012	FC Rostov	6	(0)
2012–2013	Viktoria Plzeň	6	(1)
2014	FC Sibir Novosibirsk	17	(1)
Total		322	(82)

International career
1998	Russia U-17	1	(0)
2003	Russia U-21	2	(1)
2008	Russia	3	(0)

Managerial career
- 2025–2026: Rostov (academy director of development)
- 2026–: CSKA Moscow (assistant)
- * Club domestic league appearances and goals

Roman Stanislavovich Adamov (Russian: Роман Станиславович Адамов; born 21 June 1982) is a Russian football coach and a former player. He is an assistant coach with CSKA Moscow.

== Career ==
=== Club career ===
Adamov has been prolific in the Russian Premier League since joining FC Moscow, he was signed from Terek Grozny.

In 2007, he and Roman Pavlyuchenko were top scorers in the Russian Premier League. In June 2008, he signed with FC Rubin Kazan, he won the Russian Premier League 2008 and was loafed out on 28 July 2009 to Krylya Sovetov Samara.

=== International career ===
Adamov made his debut in Russia national football team on 26 March 2008 in a friendly against Romania.

==== Euro 2008 ====
In Euro 2008, he came on as a substitute in the 70th minute of the opening match of the campaign, a 4–1 defeat to future champions Spain.

== Career honours ==
=== Club ===
Terek Grozny

- Russian First Division (1): 2004

Rubin Kazan

- Russian Premier League (1): 2008

=== International ===
Russia

- UEFA European Championship Semi-finalist (1): 2008

=== Individual ===
- Russia Premier League top goalscorer (1): 2007*

(* Jointly shared with Roman Pavlyuchenko)
