= Isaac Okoronkwo =

Nigerian footballer

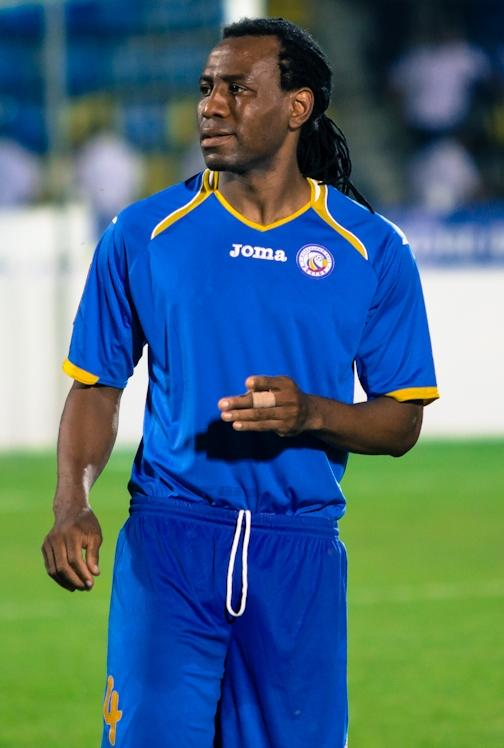
- Okoronkwo with Rostov in 2012

Personal information
- Date of birth: 1 May 1978 (age 48)
- Place of birth: Nbene, Nigeria
- Height: 1.87 m (6 ft 2 in)
- Position: Centre-back

Youth career
- FC Lagos
- Julius Berger

Senior career*
Years	Team	Apps	(Gls)
1994	Enyimba	13	(4)
1995	Iwuanyanwu Nationale	26	(7)
1996–1997	Julius Berger	25	(5)
1997–1998	Al-Rayyan	?	(?)
1998	Iwuanyanwu Nationale	25	(6)
1998–2000	Sheriff Tiraspol	41	(1)
2000–2003	Shakhtar Donetsk	53	(0)
2000–2001	→ Shakhtar-2 Donetsk	4	(0)
2003–2004	Wolverhampton Wanderers	7	(0)
2005	Alania Vladikavkaz	22	(0)
2006–2009	Moscow	64	(2)
2010–2013	Rostov	62	(1)

International career
2001–2008	Nigeria	26	(0)
- * Club domestic league appearances and goals

Isaac Okoronkwo (born 1 May 1978) is a Nigerian former footballer who played as a centre-back. He played for clubs including Shakhtar Donetsk and Wolverhampton Wanderers, and represented the Nigeria national football team at the 2002 FIFA World Cup and several Africa Cup of Nations tournaments.

== Club career ==
Okoronkwo began his professional career in 1994 with Nigerian club Enyimba, and moved to Iwuanyanwu Nationale in 1995. After playing for Julius Berger, he moved abroad in 1997 by joining Qatari club Al-Rayyan. After spending approximately half a season with Al-Rayyan, he returned to Nigeria in 1998 and rejoined Iwuanyanwu Nationale.

In 1998, he moved to Moldova to join Sheriff Tiraspol. During his two seasons with the club, he won the Moldovan Cup in the 1998–99 season, before moving to Ukrainean club Shakhtar Donetsk in 2000. At Shakhtar, he played in the UEFA Champions League and UEFA Cup, and won the Ukrainian Cup in the 2000–01 season and the Ukrainian Premier League in the 2001–02 season.

Based on his performances at Shakhtar, he moved to England in 2003 to join Wolverhampton Wanderers, playing in the Premier League. In the 2003–04 season, he made seven league appearances for Wolverhampton Wanderers and also made one appearance in the Football League Cup.

In 2005, he moved to Russian club Alania Vladikavkaz, and joined Moskva in 2006. He remained with Moskva until 2009 before moving to Rostov in 2010. He played for Rostov until 2013, retiring from professional football in July 2013.

== International career ==
Okoronkwo participated in the 2000 Summer Olympics as a member of the Nigeria Olympic team. He appeared in the group-stage matches against Australia and Italy, as well as the quarter-final against Chile. Nigeria advanced to the quarter-finals with one win and two draws in the group stage, but were eliminated after losing 1–4 to Chile.

On 13 January 2001, he made his debut for the Nigeria national football team in a match against the Zambia. He subsequently participated in the 2002 Africa Cup of Nations, appearing in the group-stage matches, the quarter-final, and the semi-final. Nigeria lost to Senegal in the semi-final before winning the third-place play-off to finish third. In the same year, he participated in the 2002 FIFA World Cup, starting all three of Nigeria's group-stage matches against Argentina, Sweden, and England. Nigeria were eliminated in the group stage.

In 2004, he participated in the 2004 Africa Cup of Nations, appearing in the group-stage matches against Morocco, South Africa, and Benin, the quarter-final against Cameroon, and the semi-final against Tunisia. Nigeria lost to Tunisia on penalties in the semi-final and defeated Algeria in the third-place play-off to finish third in the tournament.

Okoronkwo continued to play for the Nigeria national team thereafter, appearing in a match against the Uganda during the 2008 Africa Cup of Nations qualification. He made a total of 26 appearances for the national team, scoring no goals.

== Honors ==
Nigeria

- Africa Cup of Nations third place: 2004
