= Anri Khagush =

Russian footballer

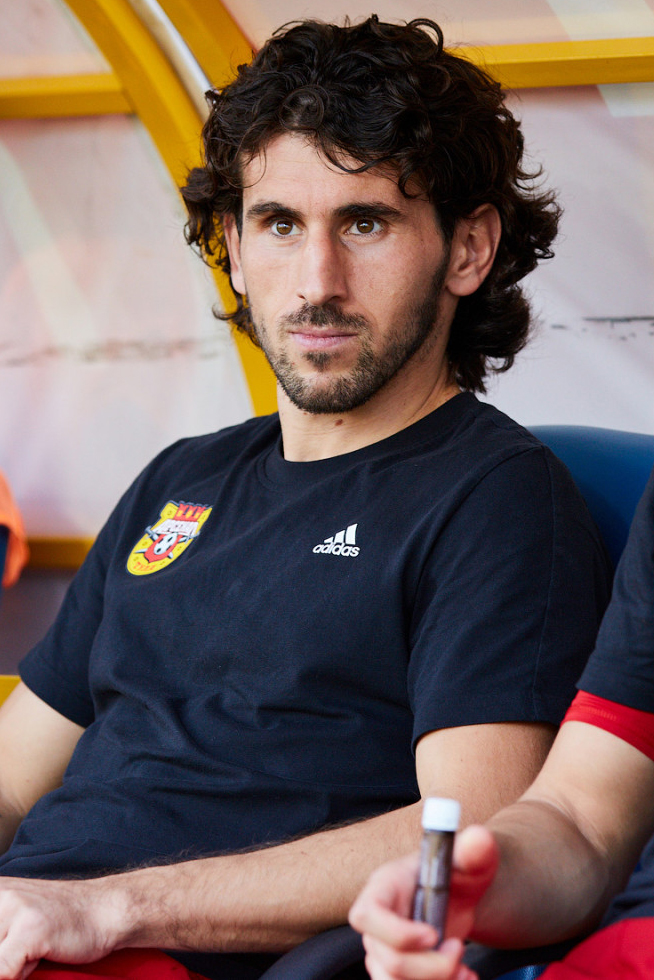
- Khagush with Arsenal Tula in 2017

Personal information
- Full name: Anri Enverovich Khagush
- Date of birth: 23 September 1986 (age 40)
- Place of birth: Gagra, Georgian SSR, Soviet Union
- Height: 1.79 m (5 ft 10 in)
- Position: Right back

Team information
- Current team: Arsenal Tula (assistant coach)

Youth career
- 2002–2004: Spartak Moscow

Senior career*
Years	Team	Apps	(Gls)
2004	Spartak Moscow	0	(0)
2005	Spartak Chelyabinsk	13	(0)
2006–2008	BATE Borisov	50	(1)
2009–2011	Rubin Kazan	0	(0)
2009	→ Kuban Krasnodar (loan)	23	(0)
2010–2011	→ Rostov (loan)	45	(2)
2012	Spartak Nalchik	5	(0)
2012	Neftekhimik Nizhnekamsk	11	(0)
2013	Torpedo-BelAZ Zhodino	9	(0)
2014	BATE Borisov	28	(1)
2015–2021	Arsenal Tula	98	(2)

International career
2007	Russia U21	1	(0)
2016	Abkhazia	5	(0)

Managerial career
- 2021–: Arsenal Tula (assistant)
Medal record
Men's football
ConIFA World Football Cup
Winner	2016 Abkhazia
- * Club domestic league appearances and goals

Anri Enverovich Khagush (Russian: Анри Энверович Хагуш; born 23 September 1986) is a Russian football coach and former player (right-back). He is of Abkhazian descent and has represented his nation at the international level.

== Club career ==
Khagush was born in Abkhazia and started his career as part of Spartak Moscow 's youth system. He joined BATE Borisov in the summer of 2006 and became an integral part of the first team during the 2007 season. Khagush was one of the important players for BATE Borisov during the 2008/2009 season, helping them reach the group stage of the Champions League for the first time in their history. He played in 5 of the Belarusians' Champions League games. On 17 September 2008, he was sent off after receiving a second yellow card in away game against Real Madrid, which ended in a 0:2 loss. He was signed by FC Rubin Kazan at the start of 2009 season. He was immediately loaned out to Kuban Krasnodar. In the years 2010-2011 he played on loan for Rostov. Khagush returned to BATE Borisov in 2014.

== Career statistics ==
=== Club ===
As of 13 May 2018

Club	Season	League			Cup		Continental		Total	
Club	Season	Division	Apps	Goals	Apps	Goals	Apps	Goals	Apps	Goals
Spartak Moscow	2004	Russian Premier League	0	0	0	0	0	0	0	0
Spartak Chelyabinsk	2005	FNL	13	0	1	0	–		14	0
BATE Borisov	2006	Belarusian Premier League	4	0	6	0	1	0	11	0
BATE Borisov	2007	Belarusian Premier League	22	1	1	0	6	0	29	1
BATE Borisov	2008	Belarusian Premier League	24	0	3	0	11	0	38	0
Kuban Krasnodar	2009	Russian Premier League	23	0	1	0	–		24	0
Rostov	2010	Russian Premier League	20	1	1	1	–		21	2
Rostov	2011–12	Russian Premier League	25	1	3	0	–		28	1
Rostov	Total		45	2	4	1	0	0	49	3
Spartak Nalchik	2011–12	Russian Premier League	5	0	–		–		5	0
Neftekhimik Nizhnekamsk	2012–13	FNL	11	0	1	0	–		12	0
Torpedo-BelAZ Zhodino	2013	Belarusian Premier League	9	0	1	0	–		10	0
BATE Borisov	2014	Belarusian Premier League	28	1	1	0	11	1	40	2
BATE Borisov	Total (2 spells)		78	2	11	0	29	1	118	3
Arsenal Tula	2014–15	Russian Premier League	11	1	1	0	–		12	1
Arsenal Tula	2015–16	FNL	27	1	1	0	–		28	1
Arsenal Tula	2016–17	Russian Premier League	11	0	1	0	–		12	0
Arsenal Tula	2017–18	Russian Premier League	17	0	1	0	–		18	0
Arsenal Tula	Total		66	2	4	0	0	0	70	2
Career total			250	6	23	1	29	1	302	8
