= Sergei Khabarov =

Russian footballer and official

Personal information
- Full name: Sergei Nikolayevich Khabarov
- Date of birth: 16 April 1986 (age 40)
- Place of birth: Moscow, Russian SFSR
- Height: 1.80 m (5 ft 11 in)
- Position: Midfielder

Team information
- Current team: FC Chertanovo Moscow (director of sports)

Senior career*
Years	Team	Apps	(Gls)
2005	FC Titan Moscow	17	(1)
2005–2010	FC Sportakademklub Moscow	93	(11)
2009	→ FC Chita (loan)	24	(0)
2010	→ FC Dynamo Bryansk (loan)	3	(0)
2011–2013	FC Fakel Voronezh	47	(1)
2013–2014	FC Tambov	20	(0)
2015–2016	FC Chertanovo Moscow	12	(0)

Managerial career
- 2018–: FC Chertanovo Moscow (director of sports)
- * Club domestic league appearances and goals

Sergei Nikolayevich Khabarov (Russian: Серге́й Николаевич Хабаров; born 16 April 1986) is a Russian professional football official and a former player. He works as a director of sports for FC Chertanovo Moscow.

== Club career ==
He played 4 seasons in the Russian Football National League for 4 different clubs.
