= Anis Boussaïdi =

Tunisian footballer

Anis Boussaidi
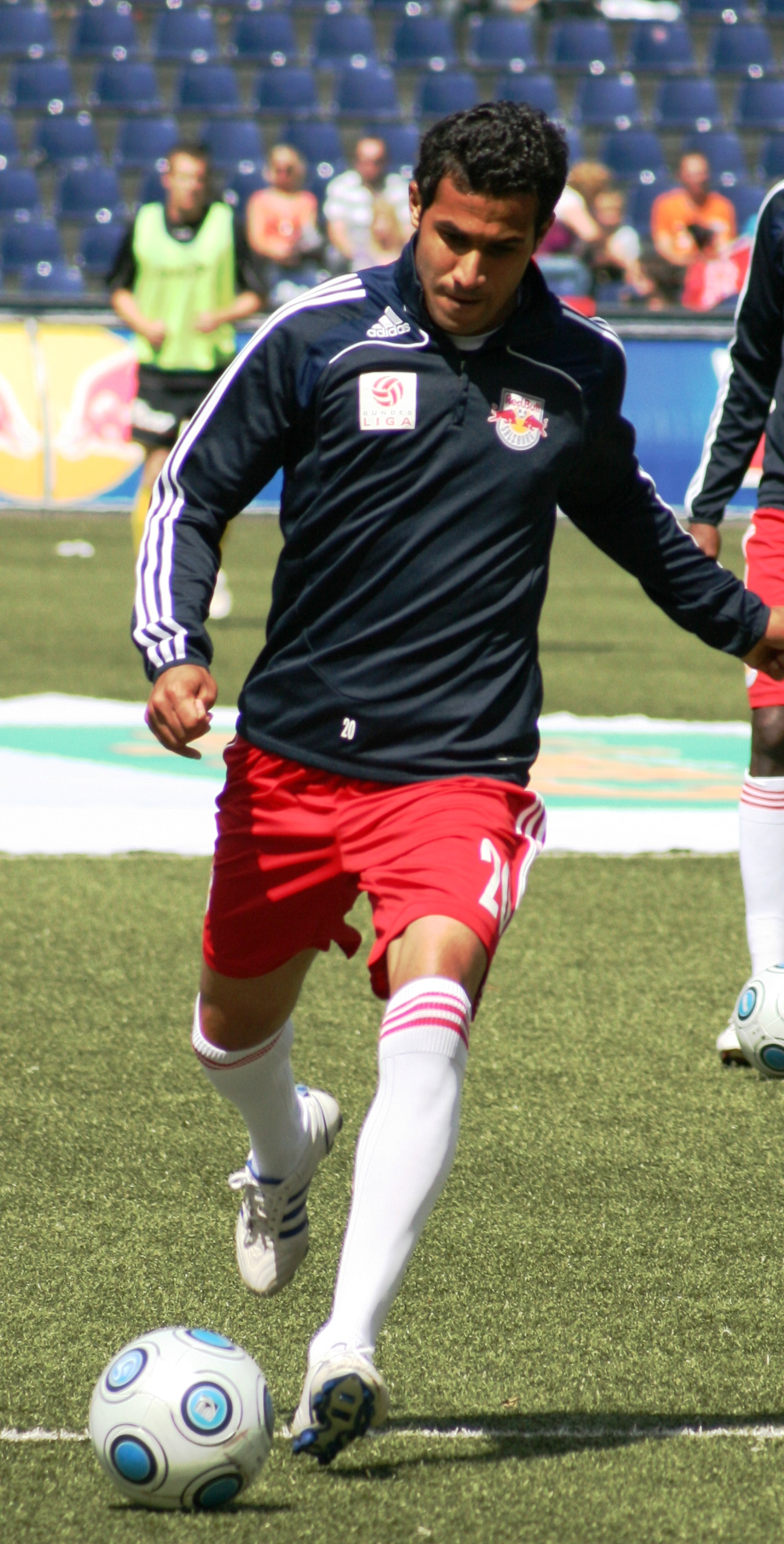

Personal information
- Date of birth: 10 April 1981 (age 45)
- Place of birth: Le Bardo, Tunisia
- Height: 1.79 m (5 ft 10 1/2 in)
- Position: Right back

Team information
- Current team: Rubin Kazan (assistant coach)

Senior career*
Years	Team	Apps	(Gls)
2001–2004	Stade Tunisien		
2004–2007	FC Metalurh Donetsk	65	(2)
2008	KV Mechelen	10	(1)
2008–2010	Red Bull Salzburg	32	(3)
2010–2011	PAOK	12	(0)
2011	Rostov	15	(0)
2012–2014	Tavriya Simferopol	56	(2)

International career
2002–2013	Tunisia	37	(2)

Managerial career
- 2020–2021: Stade Tunisien
- 2021–2023: Espérance de Tunis (assistant)
- 2023: Espérance de Tunis (caretaker)
- 2023: Tunisia U20
- 2023–2024: Tunisia (assistant)
- 2024–2025: Khimki (assistant)
- 2026–: Rubin Kazan (assistant)
- * Club domestic league appearances and goals

Anis Boussaïdi (born 10 April 1981) is a Tunisian football manager and former player who is an assistant manager with Russian club Rubin Kazan.

== Club career ==
As of January 2008, he was playing for K.V. Mechelen on loan from FC Arsenal Kyiv. Mechelen had an option to buy Boussaidi at the end of the 2007/08 season, who was loaned out immediately from Kyiv to the Belgian side following a transfer from FC Metalurh Donetsk in December 2007. Austria's Red Bull Salzburg signed him for the season 2008/09 and offered him a contract over three years. After his contract ran out at Red Bull Salzburg, he joined Greek club PAOK on a one-year deal. He played 13 times and scored once in his time in Greece. In 2011, he joined Russian club FC Rostov.

Boussaïdi signed for SC Tavriya Simferopol in the Winter of 2011, playing for them until the club disbanded following the annexation of Crimea by the Russian Federation.

== International career ==
He was a member of the Tunisian 2004 Olympic football team, who exited in the first round, finishing third in group C, behind group and gold medal winners Argentina and runners-up Australia.

In 2020 he took his first manager job, that of Stade Tunisien.
