= Oscar Ahumada =

Argentine footballer (born 1982)

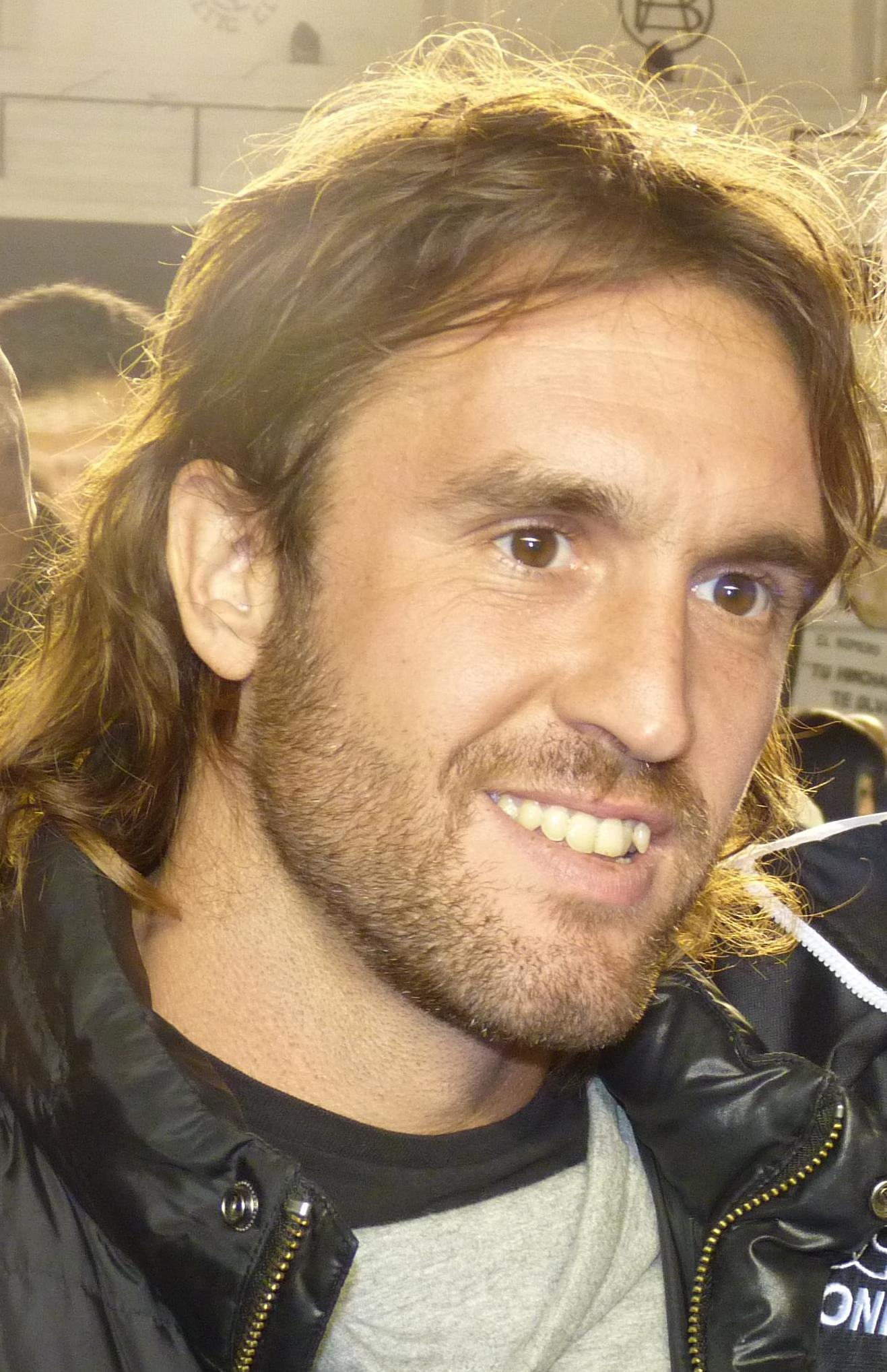
- Oscar Ahumada (2013)

Personal information
- Full name: Oscar Adrián Ahumada
- Date of birth: 31 August 1982 (age 44)
- Place of birth: Zárate, Argentina
- Height: 1.70 m (5 ft 7 in)
- Position: Defensive midfielder

Senior career*
Years	Team	Apps	(Gls)
2002–2003	River Plate	13	(0)
2004	→ VfL Wolfsburg (loan)	4	(0)
2005–2009	River Plate	103	(0)
2010–2011	Veracruz	30	(1)
2011–2012	Rostov	2	(0)
2012–2014	All Boys	36	(3)

International career
2000–2001	Argentina U20	3	(0)
2012	Argentina	1	(0)
- * Club domestic league appearances and goals

Oscar Adrián Ahumada (born 31 August 1982) is a former Argentine football midfielder.

== Club career ==
Born in Zárate, Buenos Aires, Ahumada made his professional debut with Club Atlético River Plate on 24 November 2002, in a 2–1 victory against Olimpo de Bahía Blanca. He played a small part in helping River to the Clausura 2003 and 2004 championships before moving to Germany in 2004 for a short spell with VfL Wolfsburg, where he joined compatriots Facundo Quiroga, Andrés D'Alessandro, Juan Carlos Menseguez and Diego Klimowicz.

However, in January 2005, Ahumada returned to River. In May 2008, he got involved in a dispute with River Plate supporters, after stating that "we lost because of the lack of support from our fans, they are not like the Boca fans." This altercation began after the elimination at the hands of fellow league side San Lorenzo de Almagro in the 2008 Libertadores Cup round of 16. Outraged River Plate fans wanted him to be sacked from the team, while club coach Diego Simeone warned Ahumada, but stated he would continue to include the player on the team. During the whole crisis after the Libertadores elimination, River Plate still had strong chances of winning the Clausura, and battled head-to-head with Estudiantes de La Plata and eventually won, with Ahumada playing a key role along with Ariel Ortega, Juan Pablo Carrizo and young prospect Diego Buonanotte.

In 2012, he signed for All Boys, which would be his last club.

== International career ==
Ahumada was part of the Argentina squad that won the 2001 FIFA World Youth Championship on home soil.

== Honours ==
Season	Club	Title
2001	Argentina Under-20	FIFA World Youth Championship
Clausura 2003	River Plate	Argentine Primera
Clausura 2004	River Plate	Argentine Primera
Clausura 2008	River Plate	Argentine Primera
