= FC MITOS Novocherkassk =

MITOS Novocherkassk
- Full name: Football Club MITOS Novocherkassk
- Founded: 2008
- Dissolved: 2016
- Ground: Yermak Stadium
- 2015–16: PFL, Zone South, 12th

FC MITOS Novocherkassk (Russian: ФК МИТОС Новочеркасск) was a Russian association football club from Novocherkassk, founded in 1999 as amateur club by construction company MITOS. In 2008 FC MITOS had its debut in semi-professional championship in the first league of Rostov Oblast, where it became the champion. In 2009 the club was supposed to participate in the highest league of Rostov Oblast, but applied for participation in the third Russian division (South zone), where it became the third this year. Since 2010 it played in the third-tier Russian Professional Football League (South zone). It was not registered for professional competition for the 2016–17 season.

== Notable players ==
Had international caps for their respective countries. Players whose name is listed in bold represented their countries while playing for FC MITOS.

Russia

- (Russia) Maksim Grigoryev

Uzbekistan

- (Uzbekistan) Nikolay Shirshov
