= 2010 FC Sibir Novosibirsk season =

Sibir Novosibirsk
2010 season
- Chairman: Lev Strelkov
- Manager: Igor Kriushenko
- Stadium: Spartak Stadium
- Russian Premier League: 16th
- Russian Cup: Round of 16 vs Spartak Moscow
- UEFA Europa League: Play-off round vs PSV Eindhoven
- Top goalscorer: League: Aleksei Medvedev (6); All: Aleksei Medvedev (8)

The 2010 FC Sibir Novosibirsk season was the clubs first, and only, season in the Russian Premier League, the highest tier of football in Russia. They finished the season in 16th position and were relegated back to the Russian First Division after one season. Sibir were also defeated by Spartak Moscow in the 2010–11 Russian Cup at the Round of 16 stage, and by PSV Eindhoven in the Play-off round of the 2010–11 UEFA Europa League.

== Squad ==
Note: Flags indicate national team as defined under FIFA eligibility rules; some limited exceptions apply. Players may hold more than one non-FIFA nationality.

No.	Pos.	Nation	Player
1	GK	RUS	Aleksei Solosin
2	DF	RUS	Adessoye Oyewole (on loan from Ural Sverdlovsk Oblast)
3	DF	BLR	Dmitry Molosh
4	DF	CZE	Tomáš Vychodil
6	DF	FRA	Steeve Joseph-Reinette (on loan from Slavia Sofia)
7	MF	LTU	Mantas Savėnas
9	FW	RUS	Aleksandr Antipenko
11	MF	CZE	Tomáš Čížek
12	FW	POL	Bartłomiej Grzelak
14	MF	RUS	Aleksandr Degtyaryov
15	MF	RUS	Ivan Nagibin
17	DF	RUS	Denis Bukhryakov
21	DF	SRB	Nikola Valentić
22	DF	BLR	Egor Filipenko (on loan from Spartak Moscow)
23	MF	RUS	Leonid Zuyev
24	DF	LTU	Arūnas Klimavičius

No.	Pos.	Nation	Player
25	MF	MKD	Veliče Šumulikoski
27	MF	RUS	Aleksei Aravin
28	MF	COL	Roger Cañas
30	GK	POL	Wojciech Kowalewski
40	GK	CZE	Petr Vašek (on loan from 1. FC Slovácko)
49	MF	UZB	Vagiz Galiullin (on loan from Rubin Kazan)
52	MF	RUS	Yevgeni Zinovyev
54	MF	RUS	Aleksei Vasilyev
70	DF	CZE	Martin Horák
88	MF	RUS	Maksim Astafyev
91	MF	RUS	Aleksandr Shumov
94	DF	RUS	Kirill Orlov
95	FW	RUS	Roman Belyayev
97	MF	RUS	Nikolay Lipatkin
99	FW	RUS	Igor Shevchenko

=== Reserve squad ===
Note: Flags indicate national team as defined under FIFA eligibility rules; some limited exceptions apply. Players may hold more than one non-FIFA nationality.

No.	Pos.	Nation	Player
5	DF	RUS	Mikhail Luchinkin
16	GK	RUS	Maksim Yeliseyev
18	MF	RUS	Dmitri Melnikov
19	MF	RUS	Danil Kochkin
29	MF	RUS	Andrei Shreiner
31	FW	RUS	Maksim Gorodtsov
33	MF	RUS	Pavel Logvinov
36	GK	RUS	Kirill Komarenko
38	MF	RUS	Eduard Krug
44	DF	RUS	Vyacheslav Shishkin
55	MF	RUS	Aleksei Gladyshev

No.	Pos.	Nation	Player
62	MF	RUS	Gia Kulumbegashvili
64	FW	RUS	Vladimir Glukhov
65	FW	RUS	Artyom Dudolev
68	DF	RUS	Vitali Zaprudskikh
77	GK	RUS	Ilya Trunin
80	MF	RUS	Sergei Korotkov
85	MF	RUS	Roman Mokin
90	MF	RUS	Maksim Zhitnev
92	MF	RUS	Aleksandr Maslovsky
93	DF	RUS	Sergei Burkovetsky
96	DF	RUS	Ivan Stain

== Transfers ==
=== Winter ===
In: Note: Flags indicate national team as defined under FIFA eligibility rules; some limited exceptions apply. Players may hold more than one non-FIFA nationality.

No.	Pos.	Nation	Player
1	GK	RUS	Aleksei Solosin (from (Russia) Tom Tomsk)
9	FW	RUS	Aleksandr Antipenko (from (Russia) Khimki)
11	MF	CZE	Tomáš Čížek (from (Czech Republic) Baumit Jablonec)
15	MF	RUS	Ivan Nagibin (from (Russia) Chita)
21	DF	SRB	Nikola Valentić (from (Russia) Alania Vladikavkaz)
22	DF	BLR	Egor Filipenko (on loan from (Russia) Spartak Moscow)
24	DF	LTU	Arūnas Klimavičius (from (Russia) Ural Sverdlovsk Oblast)
29	MF	RUS	Andrei Shreiner (from (Russia) Krasnodar)
30	GK	POL	Wojciech Kowalewski (from (Greece) Iraklis)
31	FW	RUS	Maksim Gorodtsov (from (Russia) Torpedo-ZIL Moscow)
33	MF	RUS	Pavel Logvinov (from (Russia) Saturn-2 Moscow Oblast)
39	FW	RUS	Vladimir Glukhov (from (Russia) Sokol Saratov)
54	MF	RUS	Aleksei Vasilyev (from (Russia) Nosta Novotroitsk, previously on loan)
65	FW	RUS	Artyom Dudolev
88	MF	RUS	Maksim Astafyev (from (Russia) Rostov)
90	MF	RUS	Maksim Zhitnev (from (Russia) KUZBASS Kemerovo)
95	MF	RUS	Roman Belyayev (end of loan at (Russia) Chita)
99	FW	RUS	Igor Shevchenko (from (Russia) Terek Grozny)
—	MF	RUS	Yevgeni Polyakov (end of loan at (Russia) KUZBASS Kemerovo)

Note: footballers transferred from Sibir-LFC (amateur level farm team) are not listed.

Out: Note: Flags indicate national team as defined under FIFA eligibility rules; some limited exceptions apply. Players may hold more than one non-FIFA nationality.

No.	Pos.	Nation	Player
1	GK	SRB	Nenad Erić (to (Kazakhstan) Kairat)
2	DF	RUS	Nikolai Samoylov (to (Russia) Ural Sverdlovsk Oblast)
5	MF	RUS	Kirill Akilov (to (Russia) Khimki)
10	FW	MKD	Goran Stankovski (to (Turkey) Diyarbakırspor)
11	MF	RUS	Denis Laktionov
14	DF	RUS	Semyon Semenenko
22	GK	RUS	Sergei Chepchugov (to (Russia) CSKA Moscow)
29	MF	RUS	Artyom Kabanov
65	GK	RUS	Aleksandr Dovbnya (to (Russia) Nizhny Novgorod)
79	FW	RUS	Sergei Shumilin (end of loan from (Russia) CSKA Moscow)
—	GK	RUS	Timur Bagautdinov (on loan to (Russia) Tyumen, previously at (Russia) SOYUZ-Gazprom Izhevsk)
—	MF	RUS	Aleksei Zhitnikov (to (Russia) Rotor Volgograd, previously on loan at (Russia) Vityaz Podolsk)
—	DF	RUS	Igor Shestakov (to (Russia) Rotor Volgograd, previously on loan at (Russia) Chernomorets Novorossiysk)

=== Summer ===
In: Note: Flags indicate national team as defined under FIFA eligibility rules; some limited exceptions apply. Players may hold more than one non-FIFA nationality.

No.	Pos.	Nation	Player
2	DF	RUS	Adessoye Oyewole (on loan from (Russia) Ural Sverdlovsk Oblast)
6	DF	FRA	Steeve Joseph-Reinette (on loan from (Bulgaria) Slavia Sofia)
12	FW	POL	Bartłomiej Grzelak (from (Poland) Legia Warszawa)
25	MF	MKD	Veliče Šumulikoski (from (England) Preston North End)
28	MF	COL	Roger Cañas (from (Latvia) Tranzit)
40	GK	CZE	Petr Vašek (on loan from (Czech Republic) Slovácko)
49	MF	UZB	Vagiz Galiulin (on loan from (Russia) Rubin Kazan)
62	FW	RUS	Gia Kulumbegashvili
80	MF	RUS	Sergei Korotkov (from (Russia) Sibir-LFL)
96	MF	RUS	Ivan Stain (from (Russia) Akademiya Togliatti)

Out: Note: Flags indicate national team as defined under FIFA eligibility rules; some limited exceptions apply. Players may hold more than one non-FIFA nationality.

No.	Pos.	Nation	Player
8	MF	RUS	Aleksandr Makarenko (on loan to (Russia) Zhemchuzhina-Sochi)
10	FW	BLR	Gennady Bliznyuk (released)
13	FW	RUS	Aleksei Medvedev (to (Russia) Rubin Kazan)
20	MF	RUS	Aleksandr Shulenin (to (Russia) Volga Nizhny Novgorod)
61	DF	RUS	Roman Amirkhanov (to (Russia) Spartak Nalchik)
66	MF	RUS	Aleksandr Mineyev (to (Russia) SKA-Energiya Khabarovsk)
79	FW	RUS	Vitali Sidorov
98	DF	RUS	Denis Gudayev (on loan to (Russia) Radian-Baikal Irkutsk)

== Competitions ==
=== Russian Premier League ===
==== Results ====
14 March 2010 1	Sibir Novosibirsk	0 – 2	Terek Grozny	Novosibirsk
15:30 KRAT (UTC+7)	Bukhryakov (yellow card) 45' (yellow-red card) 88'	Report	Georgiev (yellow card) 18'; Kobenko 40'; Asildarov 55'; Amelyanchuk (yellow card) 55'	Stadium: Spartak Stadium; Attendance: 11,500; Referee: Eduard Malyi

20 March 2010 2	Saturn Ramenskoye	1 – 1	Sibir Novosibirsk	Ramenskoye
20:30 KRAT (UTC+7)	Sapeta (yellow card) 11'; Karyaka (yellow card) 28'; Ivanov 73'	Report	Degtyaryov (yellow card) 28'; Shulenin (yellow card) 30'; Medvedev 45'; Makarenko (yellow card) 48' (yellow-red card) 77'; Shevchenko (yellow card) 90'	Stadium: Saturn Stadium; Attendance: 3,000; Referee: Vladislav Bezborodov

27 March 2010 3	Sibir Novosibirsk	0 – 2	Spartak Nalchik	Novosibirsk
14:00 KRAT (UTC+7)	Klimavičius (yellow card) 29'; Filipenko (yellow card) 46'	Report	Dyadyun 17', 53'; Filatov (yellow card) 26'; Siradze (yellow card) 70'	Stadium: Spartak Stadium; Attendance: 9,000; Referee: Aleksey Eskov

3 April 2010 4	Amkar Perm	3 – 1	Sibir Novosibirsk	Perm
15:00 KRAT (UTC+7)	Volkov 10'; Peev 23', 90'; Sokolov (yellow card) 49'; Pomerko (yellow card) 85'	Report	Molosh 34' (yellow card) 81'; Vasilyev (yellow card) 36'; Antipenko (yellow card) 43'	Stadium: Zvezda Stadium; Attendance: 10,500; Referee: Vyacheslav Kharlamov

11 April 2010 5	Sibir Novosibirsk	2 – 4	Anzhi Makhachkala	Novosibirsk
14:30 KRAT (UTC+7)	Bliznyuk (yellow card) 38'; Aravin (yellow card) 51' (red card) 68'; A.Medvedev 58'; Astafyev 60'; Makarenko (red card) 71'; Molosh (yellow card) 88'	Report	Holenda (yellow card) 10' (goal) 34', 48'; Tsorayev 21', 90' (yellow card) 90'; Bakayev (yellow card) 38'; Khojava (yellow card) 78'; Revishvili (yellow card) 83'	Stadium: Spartak Stadium; Attendance: 10,000; Referee: Maksim Layushkin

17 April 2010 6	Alania Vladikavkaz	2 – 1	Sibir Novosibirsk	Vladikavkaz
21:30 KRAT (UTC+7)	Gabulov (yellow card) 65'; Kirillov 72'; Mamah (yellow card) 79'; Ivanov (yellow card) 86'; Marenich 87'	Report	Molosh (yellow card) 43'; Čížek 46'; Klimavičius (yellow card) 83'	Stadium: Republican Spartak Stadium; Attendance: 17,500; Referee: Evgeny Turbin

24 April 2010 7	Sibir Novosibirsk	1 – 4	CSKA Moscow	Novosibirsk
17:00 KRAT (UTC+7)	Bliznyuk (yellow card) 8'; Astafyev (yellow card) 14'; Čížek 74'	Report	Ignashevich 11' (yellow card) 40'; Guilherme 45'; Necid 54'; Dzagoev 73' (yellow card) 75'	Stadium: Spartak Stadium; Attendance: 12,400; Referee: Vladislav Bezborodov

2 May 2010 8	Sibir Novosibirsk	2 – 0	Rostov	Novosibirsk
14:30 MSK (UTC+4)	Aravin (yellow card) 52'; Medvedev 57'; Makarenko (yellow card) 74'; Nagibin 87'	Report	Grigalava (yellow card) 40'; Adamov (yellow card) 61'; Gațcan (yellow card) 89'	Stadium: Spartak Stadium; Attendance: 10,000; Referee: Yuri Baskakov

6 May 2010 9	Rubin Kazan	1 – 0	Sibir Novosibirsk	Kazan
17:15 KRAT (UTC+7)	Noboa 51'	Report	Makarenko (yellow card) 32'; Bukhryakov (yellow card) 34'; Valentić (yellow card) 58'; Kowalewski (yellow card) 58'	Stadium: Central Stadium; Attendance: 5,200; Referee: Vyacheslav Sibir Novosibirsk

10 May 2010 10	Sibir Novosibirsk	4 – 1	Krylia Sovetov	Novosibirsk
14:30 KRAT (UTC+7)	Čížek 8'; Medvedev 17'; Makarenko (yellow card) 31'; Klimavičius 67'; Astafyev 80'; Valentić (yellow card) 85'	Report	Tkachyov 6'; Bobyor (yellow card) 66'	Stadium: Spartak Stadium; Attendance: 10,000; Referee: Almir Kayumov

4 July 2010 13	Zenit St.Petersburg	2 – 0	Sibir Novosibirsk	Saint Petersburg
21:45 KRAT (UTC+7)	Lombaerts 30'; Shirokov 54'	Report	Valentić (yellow card) 33'; Medvedev (yellow card) 57'; Astafyev (yellow card) 57'; Shulenin (yellow card) 77'; Shumov (yellow card) 87'; Shevchenko (yellow card) 89'	Stadium: Petrovsky Stadium; Attendance: 18,500; Referee: Evgeni Turbin

9 July 2010 12	Sibir Novosibirsk	2 – 2	Dynamo Moscow	Novosibirsk
17:15 KRAT (UTC+7)	Bukhryakov (yellow card) 14'; Molosh (yellow card) 28'; Shevchenko 58'; Nagibin 80'; Aravin (yellow card) 90'	Report	D.Kombarov 7'; Epureanu (yellow card) 32'; Fernández 68'; Kowalczyk (yellow card) 79'	Stadium: Spartak Stadium; Attendance: 11,500; Referee: Mikhail Vilkov

21 July 2010 11	Spartak Moscow	5 – 3	Sibir Novosibirsk	Moscow
23:00 KRAT (UTC+7)	Ari 5', 52'; Ananidze 23', 67'; Ibson (yellow card) 44'; Jiránek 76'; Zotov (yellow card) 90'	Report	Molosh (yellow card) 62'; Antipenko 70'; Čížek 73'; Astafyev 84'	Stadium: Luzhniki Stadium; Attendance: 11,000; Referee: Vyachelsav Popov

25 July 2010 14	Sibir Novosibirsk	2 – 2	Lokomotiv Moscow	Novosibirsk
17:15 KRAT (UTC+7)	Molosh (yellow card) 24' (goal) 67'; Medvedev 49'; Shevchenko (yellow card) 60'; Valentić (yellow card) 63'	Report	Aliyev 16', 31'; Dujmović (yellow card) 57'; Rodolfo (yellow card) 90'	Stadium: Spartak Stadium; Attendance: 12,000; Referee: Eduard Malyi

2 August 2010 15	Tom Tomsk	3 – 2	Sibir Novosibirsk	Tomsk
16:00 MSK (UTC+4)	Dzyuba 3', 21'; Kharitonov (red card) 45'; Kim (yellow card) 45'; D.N.Smirnov 90'	Report	Medvedev 22'; Shevchenko 24'; Molosh (yellow card) 31'; Degtyaryov (yellow card) 52'	Stadium: Trud Stadium; Attendance: 13,000; Referee: Yuri Baskakov

8 August 2010 16	Sibir Novosibirsk	0 – 1	Saturn Ramenskoye	Novosibirsk
KRAT (UTC+7)	Valentić (yellow card) 75'; Čížek (yellow card) 83'; Vychodil (yellow card) 90'	Report	Nemov 85'	Stadium: Spartak Stadium; Attendance: 10,000; Referee: Sergey Karasev

14 August 2010 17	Spartak Nalchik	4 – 2	Sibir Novosibirsk	Nalchik
23:45 KRAT (UTC+7)	Dyadyun 24'; Leandro 40' (pen.), 83' (pen.) (yellow card) 83'; Džudović (yellow card) 66'; Kisenkov (yellow card) 77'; Gogua 90'	Report	Shevchenko 14'; Molosh (yellow card) 26'; Cañas (yellow card) 39'; Astafyev (yellow card) 41'; Šumulikoski (yellow card) 50'; Vychodil (yellow card) 81'; Belyayev (yellow card) 90'	Stadium: Spartak Stadium; Attendance: 10,000; Referee: Igor Egorov

22 August 2010 18	Sibir Novosibirsk	1 – 0	Amkar Perm	Novosibirsk
16:45 KRAT (UTC+7)	Shevchenko 80' (yellow card) 90'; Zinovyev (yellow card) 90'	Report	Cherenchikov (yellow card) 62'	Stadium: Spartak Stadium; Attendance: 9,000; Referee: Vladislav Bezborodov

30 August 2010 19	Anzhi Makhachkala	1 – 0	Sibir Novosibirsk	Makhachkala
21:00 KRAT (UTC+7)	Bakayev (yellow card) 45'; Tsorayev 51' (pen.); Kébé (yellow card) 79'; Revishvili (yellow card) 90'	Report	Valentić (yellow card) 6'; Klimavičius (yellow card) 13'; Vychodil (yellow card) 52'	Stadium: Dynamo Stadium; Attendance: 11,000; Referee: Aleksandr Kolobaev

11 September 2010 20	Sibir Novosibirsk	1 – 2	Alania Vladikavkaz	Novosibirsk
16:00 KRAT (UTC+7)	Zinovyev 12'; Čížek (yellow card) 38'	Report	Gnanou (yellow card) 62' (goal) 90'; Rotenberg (yellow card) 81'; Bikmaev (yellow card) 88'; Collins 90'	Stadium: Spartak Stadium; Attendance: 6,500; Referee: Aleksey Eskov

20 September 2010 21	CSKA Moscow	1 – 0	Sibir Novosibirsk	Moscow
23:00 KRAT (UTC+7)	Oliseh 74'	Report	Molosh (yellow card) 88'	Stadium: Arena Khimki; Attendance: 4,500; Referee: Mikhail Vilkov

26 September 2010 22	Rostov	0 – 1	Sibir Novosibirsk	Rostov-on-Don
21:00 MSK (UTC+4)	Kulchy (yellow card) 43'; Okoronkwo (yellow card) 45'	Report	Šumulikoski (yellow card) 7'; Grzelak 37'; Aravin (yellow card) 64'; Astafyev (yellow card) 77'	Stadium: Olimp-2; Attendance: 11,000; Referee: Evgeny Turbin

3 October 2010 23	Sibir Novosibirsk	2 – 2	Rubin Kazan	Novosibirsk
14:45 KRAT (UTC+7)	Nagibin (yellow card) 27'; Joseph-Reinette 29'; Oyewole (yellow card) 50'; Belyayev 83' (yellow card) 83'	Report	Eduardo (yellow card) 45'; Noboa 50' (pen.); Bocchetti (yellow card) 58' (goal) 80'; Kornilenko (yellow card) 62'; Kuzmin (yellow card) 73'; Kaleshin (yellow card) 82' (yellow-red card) 90'	Stadium: Spartak Stadium; Attendance: 8,000; Referee: Nikolai Ivanov

17 October 2010 24	Krylia Sovetov	1 – 1	Sibir Novosibirsk	Samara
21:30 KRAT (UTC+7)	Ivanov (yellow card) 34'; Yakovlev 48'; Leilton (yellow card) 90'	Report	Šumulikoski (yellow card) 19'; Shevchenko (yellow card) 33'; Oyewole 41' (yellow card) 90'; Galiulin (yellow card) 45'; Cañas (yellow card) 90'	Stadium: Metallurg Stadium; Attendance: 15,400; Referee: Vyacheslav Kharlamov

23 October 2010 25	Sibir Novosibirsk	0 – 0	Spartak Moscow	Novosibirsk
14:45 KRAT (UTC+7)	Šumulikoski (yellow card) 8'; Belyayev (yellow card) 90'	Report	McGeady (yellow card) 36'; Sheshukov (yellow card) 41'; Ivanov (yellow card) 71'; Zotov (yellow card) 85'	Stadium: Spartak Stadium; Attendance: 12,000; Referee: Vitaly Meshkov

30 October 2010 26	Dynamo Moscow	4 – 1	Sibir Novosibirsk	Moscow
21:00 KRAT (UTC+7)	Kurányi 64'; Fernández 67'; Wilkshire (yellow card) 70'; Samedov 86'; Semshov 90'	Report	Grzelak 61'	Stadium: Arena Khimki; Attendance: 4,484; Referee: Stanislav Sukhina

7 November 2010 27	Sibir Novosibirsk	2 – 5	Zenit St.Petersburg	Spartak Stadium
18:00 KRAT (UTC+7)	Nagibin 2'; Grzelak 6'; Astafyev (yellow card) 7'; Šumulikoski (yellow card) 20'; Aravin (yellow card) 72'	Report	Bystrov 13'; Joseph-Reinette 15' (o.g.); Zyryanov (yellow card) 55'; Danny 61'; Semak 63'; Anyukov 65'	Stadium: Novosibirsk; Attendance: 12,100; Referee: Almir Kayumov

14 November 2010 28	Lokomotiv Moscow	1 – 1	Sibir Novosibirsk	Moscow
20:15 KRAT (UTC+7)	Aliyev (yellow card) 51'; Sychev 63'	Report	Vychodil (yellow card) 28'; Galiullin (yellow card) 35'; Joseph-Reinette (yellow card) 65'; Molosh (yellow card) 86'	Stadium: Lokomotiv Stadium; Attendance: 12,170; Referee: Vladimir Kazmenko

20 November 2010 29	Sibir Novosibirsk	0 – 1	Tom Tomsk	Novosibirsk
15:00 MSK (UTC+4)	Antipenko (yellow card) 70'; Šumulikoski (yellow card) 72'	Report	Dzyuba 52' (pen.); Michkov (yellow card) 61'; Jokić (red card) 84'	Stadium: Spartak Stadium; Attendance: 5,000; Referee: Vitali Meshkov

28 November 2010 30	Terek Grozny	1 – 1	Sibir Novosibirsk	Grozny
18:00 KRAT (UTC+7)	Asildarov 6'; Bracamonte (yellow card) 11'	Report	Shevchenko (yellow card) 40'; Aravin (yellow card) 42'; Antipenko (yellow card) 65'; Čížek 71'; Šumulikoski (yellow card) 90'	Stadium: Sultan Bilimkhanov Stadium; Attendance: 7,000; Referee: Aleksei Yeskov

==== League table ====
Pos	Team	Pld	W	D	L	GF	GA	GD	Pts	Qualification or relegation
12	Terek Grozny	30	8	9	13	28	34	−6	33	
13	Krylia Sovetov Samara	30	7	10	13	28	40	−12	31	
14	Amkar Perm	30	8	6	16	24	35	−11	30	
15	Alania Vladikavkaz (Note: Despite being relegated, Alania Vladikavkaz will participate in UEFA Europa League 3rd qualifying round as finalists of the 2010–11 Russian Cup competition, lost to CSKA Moscow.) (R)	30	7	9	14	25	41	−16	30	Relegation to Football National League and qualification to Europa League third qualifying round
16	Sibir Novosibirsk (R)	30	4	8	18	34	58	−24	20	Relegation to Football National League

Source: RFPL (in Russian)
Rules for classification: 1st points; 2nd matches won; 3rd head-to-head (points, matches won, goal difference, goals scored, away goals scored); 4th goal difference; 5th goals scored; 6th away goals scored; 7th position in previous season or decision game
(R) Relegated

=== Russian Cup ===
13 July 2010 Round of 32	Avangard Kursk	2 – 5 (a.e.t.)	Sibir Novosibirsk	Kursk
21:30 MSK (UTC+4)	Borozdin 8'; Borzenkov 10'; Shcheglov (yellow card) 77'; Chizhov (yellow card) 78' (yellow-red card) 81'	Report	Shevchenko 50', 115'; Bukhryakov (yellow card) 75'; Molosh 83' (pen.); Medvedev 107'; Čížek 120'	Stadium: Trudovye Rezervy Stadium; Attendance: 5,500; Referee: Maksim Layushkin

Round 16 took place during the 2011–12 season.

=== UEFA Europa League ===
==== Qualifying rounds ====
29 July 2010 Third Qualifying Round 1st leg	Sibir Novosibirsk (Russia)	1 – 0	(Cyprus) Apollon	Novosibirsk, Russia
19:00 KRAT (UTC+7)	Molosh (yellow card) 8'; Medvedev 74'	Report	Morris (yellow card) 10'; Kosowski (yellow card) 12'	Stadium: Spartak Stadium; Attendance: 10,000; Referee: Libor Kovařik (Czech Republic)

6 August 2010 Third Qualifying Round 2nd leg	Apollon (Cyprus)	2 – 1 (2 – 2 (a) agg.)	(Russia) Sibir Novosibirsk	Limassol, Cyprus
00:00 KRAT (UTC+7)	Semedo 12'; Kosowski (red card) 15'; Núñez 71'	Report	Shulenin (yellow card) 21'; Klimavičius (yellow card) 37'; Valentić (yellow card) 62'; Shevchenko 63'; Solosin (yellow card) 86'	Stadium: Tsirion Stadium; Attendance: 6,000; Referee: Zsolt Szabo (Hungary)

19 August 2010 Play-off round 1st leg	Sibir Novosibirsk (Russia)	1 – 0	(Netherlands) PSV Eindhoven	Novosibirsk, Russia
19:00 KRAT (UTC+7)	Vychodil (yellow card) 20'; Shevchenko (yellow card) 39' (yellow-red card) 43'; Aravin (yellow card) 68'; Degtyaryov 90+2'	Report	Rodríguez (red card) 39'	Stadium: Spartak Stadium; Attendance: 11,500; Referee: Tommy Skjerven (Norway)

27 August 2010 Play-off round 2nd leg	PSV Eindhoven (Netherlands)	5 – 0 (5 – 1 agg.)	(Russia) Sibir Novosibirsk	Eindhoven, Netherlands
00:30 KRAT (UTC+7)	Berg 38'; Engelaar 56'; Pieters (yellow card) 58'; Toivonen 64'; Dzsudzsák 73', 90' (pen.)	Report	Zinovyev (yellow card) 33'; Aravin (yellow card) 35'; Solosin (yellow card) 55'; Astafyev (yellow card) 59'	Stadium: Philips Stadion; Attendance: 20,000; Referee: Stefan Johannesson (Sweden)

== Squad statistics ==
As of match played 28 November 2010

=== Appearances and goals ===
No.	Pos	Nat	Player	Total		Premier League		Russian Cup		UEFA Europa League	
No.	Pos	Nat	Player	Apps	Goals	Apps	Goals	Apps	Goals	Apps	Goals
1	GK	(Russia) RUS	Aleksei Solosin	15	0	10+2	0	0	0	3	0
2	DF	(Russia) RUS	Adessoye Oyewole	7	1	6+1	1	0	0	0	0
3	DF	(Belarus) BLR	Dmitry Molosh	25	5	22	4	1	1	1+1	0
4	DF	(Czech Republic) CZE	Tomáš Vychodil	27	0	23	0	0	0	4	0
6	DF	(France) FRA	Steeve Joseph-Reinette	15	1	13	1	0	0	2	0
7	MF	(Lithuania) LTU	Mantas Savėnas	2	0	0+1	0	1	0	0	0
9	FW	(Russia) RUS	Aleksandr Antipenko	21	1	10+9	1	1	0	1	0
11	MF	(Czech Republic) CZE	Tomáš Čížek	29	6	19+5	5	1	1	2+2	0
12	FW	(Poland) POL	Bartłomiej Grzelak	8	3	8	3	0	0	0	0
14	MF	(Russia) RUS	Aleksandr Degtyaryov	22	1	8+10	0	1	0	1+2	1
15	MF	(Russia) RUS	Ivan Nagibin	27	3	15+9	3	0+1	0	2	0
17	DF	(Russia) RUS	Denis Bukhryakov	15	0	11	0	1	0	3	0
21	DF	(Serbia) SRB	Nikola Valentić	14	0	10+2	0	0	0	2	0
22	DF	(Belarus) BLR	Egor Filipenko	20	0	15+3	0	0	0	1+1	0
23	DF	(Russia) RUS	Leonid Zuyev	1	0	1	0	0	0	0	0
24	DF	(Lithuania) LTU	Arūnas Klimavičius	14	1	7+4	1	1	0	1+1	0
25	MF	(North Macedonia) MKD	Veliče Šumulikoski	15	0	13	0	0	0	2	0
27	DF	(Russia) RUS	Aleksei Aravin	26	0	18+4	0	1	0	2+1	0
28	MF	(Colombia) COL	Roger Cañas	16	0	9+5	0	0	0	2	0
30	GK	(Poland) POL	Wojciech Kowalewski	16	0	14	0	1	0	1	0
40	GK	(Czech Republic) CZE	Petr Vašek	6	0	6	0	0	0	0	0
49	MF	(Uzbekistan) UZB	Vagiz Galiulin	11	0	9+2	0	0	0	0	0
52	MF	(Russia) RUS	Yevgeni Zinovyev	13	1	8+3	1	0	0	2	0
54	MF	(Russia) RUS	Aleksei Vasilyev	10	0	2+7	0	0	0	0+1	0
70	DF	(Czech Republic) CZE	Martin Horák	1	0	1	0	0	0	0	0
88	MF	(Russia) RUS	Maksim Astafyev	29	3	18+6	3	0+1	0	4	0
91	MF	(Russia) RUS	Aleksandr Shumov	1	0	0+1	0	0	0	0	0
95	FW	(Russia) RUS	Roman Belyayev	10	1	7	1	0	0	2+1	0
99	FW	(Russia) RUS	Igor Shevchenko	23	7	14+5	4	0+1	2	2+1	1
Players who left Sibir Novosibirsk during the season:
8	MF	(Russia) RUS	Aleksandr Makarenko	14	0	9+2	0	1	0	1+1	0
10	FW	(Belarus) BLR	Gennadi Bliznyuk	5	0	5	0	0	0	0	0
13	MF	(Russia) RUS	Aleksei Medvedev	17	8	14	6	1	1	2	1
20	MF	(Russia) RUS	Aleksandr Shulenin	8	0	6+1	0	0	0	1	0

=== Goal Scorers ===
Place	Position	Nation	Number	Name	Premier League	Russian Cup	UEFA Europa League	Total
1	FW	(Russia)	13	Aleksei Medvedev	6	1	1	8
2	FW	(Russia)	99	Igor Shevchenko	4	2	1	7
3	MF	(Czech Republic)	11	Tomáš Čížek	5	1	0	6
4	DF	(Belarus)	3	Dmitry Molosh	4	1	0	5
5	FW	(Poland)	12	Bartłomiej Grzelak	3	0	0	3
5	DF	(Russia)	15	Ivan Nagibin	3	0	0	3
5	MF	(Russia)	88	Maksim Astafyev	3	0	0	3
5	FW	(Russia)	9	Aleksandr Antipenko	1	0	0	1
5	DF	(France)	6	Steeve Joseph-Reinette	1	0	0	1
5	DF	(Russia)	2	Adessoye Oyewole	1	0	0	1
5	DF	(Lithuania)	24	Arūnas Klimavičius	1	0	0	1
5	MF	(Russia)	52	Yevgeni Zinovyev	1	0	0	1
5	FW	(Russia)	95	Roman Belyayev	1	0	0	1
5	MF	(Russia)	14	Aleksandr Degtyaryov	0	0	1	1
				TOTALS	34	5	3	42

=== Disciplinary record ===
Number	Nation	Position	Name	Premier League		Russian Cup		UEFA Europa League		Total	
Number	Nation	Position	Name	Yellow card	Red card	Yellow card	Red card	Yellow card	Red card	Yellow card	Red card
1	(Russia)	GK	Aleksei Solosin	0	0	0	0	2	0	2	0
2	(Russia)	DF	Adessoye Oyewole	2	0	0	0	0	0	2	0
3	(Belarus)	DF	Dmitry Molosh	9	0	0	0	1	0	10	0
4	(Czech Republic)	DF	Tomáš Vychodil	4	0	0	0	1	0	5	0
6	(France)	DF	Steeve Joseph-Reinette	1	0	0	0	0	0	1	0
8	(Russia)	MF	Aleksandr Makarenko	5	1	0	0	0	0	5	1
9	(Russia)	FW	Aleksandr Antipenko	3	0	0	0	0	0	3	0
10	(Belarus)	FW	Gennadi Bliznyuk	2	0	0	0	0	0	2	0
11	(Czech Republic)	MF	Tomáš Čížek	2	0	0	0	0	0	2	0
13	(Russia)	FW	Aleksei Medvedev	1	0	0	0	0	0	1	0
14	(Russia)	MF	Aleksandr Degtyaryov	2	0	0	0	0	0	2	0
15	(Russia)	MF	Ivan Nagibin	1	0	0	0	0	0	1	0
17	(Russia)	DF	Denis Bukhryakov	4	1	1	0	0	0	5	1
20	(Russia)	MF	Aleksandr Shulenin	1	0	0	0	1	0	2	0
21	(Serbia)	DF	Nikola Valentić	6	0	0	0	1	0	7	0
22	(Belarus)	DF	Egor Filipenko	1	0	0	0	0	0	1	0
24	(Lithuania)	DF	Arūnas Klimavičius	3	0	0	0	1	0	4	0
25	(North Macedonia)	MF	Veliče Šumulikoski	7	0	0	0	0	0	7	0
27	(Russia)	MF	Aleksei Aravin	5	1	0	0	2	0	7	1
28	(Colombia)	MF	Roger Cañas	2	0	0	0	0	0	2	0
30	(Poland)	GK	Wojciech Kowalewski	1	0	0	0	0	0	1	0
49	(Uzbekistan)	MF	Vagiz Galiulin	2	0	0	0	0	0	2	0
52	(Russia)	MF	Yevgeni Zinovyev	1	0	0	0	1	0	2	0
54	(Russia)	MF	Aleksei Vasilyev	1	0	0	0	0	0	1	0
88	(Russia)	MF	Maksim Astafyev	5	0	0	0	1	0	6	0
91	(Russia)	MF	Aleksandr Shumov	1	0	0	0	1	0	2	0
95	(Russia)	FW	Roman Belyayev	3	0	0	0	0	0	3	0
99	(Russia)	FW	Igor Shevchenko	6	0	0	0	2	1	8	1
			TOTALS	81	3	1	0	13	1	95	4
