= 2009–10 Russian Cup =

Tournament details
- Country: Russia

Final positions
- Champions: Zenit Saint Petersburg
- Runners-up: Sibir Novosibirsk

The 2009–10 Russian Cup was the eighteenth season of the Russian football knockout tournament since the dissolution of Soviet Union. The competition started on 20 April 2009 and finished with the final held on 16 May 2010.

== First round ==
This round featured 7 Second Division teams and 1 amateur team. The games were played between 20 April and 3 May 2009.

=== Section South ===
Team 1	Score	Team 2
FC Volgograd (III)	1–0	Rotor Volgograd (III)
Avtodor Vladikavkaz (III)	1–0	Angusht Nazran (III)
FC Stavropol (III)	1–0	FC Stavropolye-2009 (III)

=== Section Ural-Povolzhye ===
Team 1	Score	Team 2
Oktan Perm (IV)	2–1	Bashinformsvyaz-Dynamo Ufa (III)

== Second round ==
In this round entered 4 winners from the First Round and the 58 Second Division teams and 2 amateur teams. The matches were played between 24 April and 14 May 2009.

=== Section West ===
Team 1	Score	Team 2
Sever Murmansk (III)	3–2	Smena-Zenit Saint Petersburg (III)
Pskov-747 Pskov (III)	2–0	Dynamo Saint Petersburg (III)
Volga Tver (III)	2–1 (a.e.t.)	Volochanin-Ratmir Vyshny Volochyok (III)
FC Zelenograd (III)	0–1	FC Istra (III)
Torpedo-ZIL Moscow (III)	1–0 (a.e.t.)	Lokomotiv-2 Moscow (III)
Spartak Kostroma (III)	1–0	Dynamo Vologda (III)
Tekstilshchik Ivanovo (III)	3–0	FC Dmitrov (III)

=== Section Center ===
Team 1	Score	Team 2
FC Yelets (III)	0–3	Rusichi Oryol (III)
Dnepr Smolensk (III)	0–1	Avangard Podolsk (III)
Nika Moscow (III)	6–1	KAIT-Sport Moscow (IV)
Spartak Tambov (III)	0–3	FC Ryazan (III)
Zorky Krasnogorsk (IV)	2–0	Znamya Truda Orekhovo-Zuyevo (III)
FSA Voronezh (III)	1–4	Fakel-Voronezh Voronezh (III)
Zodiak-Oskol Stary Oskol (III)	3–1	Lokomotiv Liski (III)

=== Section East ===
Team 1	Score	Team 2
Irtysh Omsk (III)	0–1	KUZBASS Kemerovo (III)
Metallurg Krasnoyarsk (III)	4–2	Sibiryak Bratsk (III)

=== Section South ===
Team 1	Score	Team 2
Energiya Volzhsky (III)	0–1	FC Volgograd
Dagdizel Kaspiysk (III)	2–1	FC Astrakhan (III)
SKA Rostov-on-Don (III)	1–1 (a.e.t.) (4–3 p)	Torpedo Armavir (III)
FC Taganrog (III)	0–3	Bataysk-2007 (III)
FC Abinsk (III)	2–5	Zhemchuzhina Sochi (III)
Krasnodar-2000 (III)	4–3 (a.e.t.)	Druzhba Maykop (III)
FC Stavropol	1–0	Avtodor Vladikavkaz
Mashuk-KMV Pyatigorsk (III)	2–0	Kavkaztransgaz-2005 Ryzdvyany (III)

=== Section Ural-Povolzhye ===
Team 1	Score	Team 2
Volga Ulyanovsk (III)	2–3 (a.e.t.)	Mordovia Saransk (III)
Lada Togliatti (III)	1–1 (a.e.t.) (2–3 p)	Sokol-Saratov Saratov (III)
Dynamo Kirov (III)	1–2	Khimik Dzerzhinsk (III)
SOYUZ-Gazprom Izhevsk (III)	3–1	Neftekhimik Nizhnekamsk (III)
Rubin-2 Kazan (III)	0–0 (a.e.t.) (4–3 p)	Academia Dimitrovgrad (III)
Gazovik Orenburg (III)	1–0	FC Togliatti (III)
Gornyak Uchaly (III)	4–0	Oktan Perm
FC Tyumen (III)	0–2	FC Chelyabinsk (III)

== Third round ==
In this round entered 32 winners from the Second Round and the 16 remaining Second Division teams. The matches were played between 14 May and 7 June 2009.

=== Section West ===
Team 1	Score	Team 2
Pskov-747 Pskov	3–0	Sever Murmansk
FC Istra	0–1	Volga Tver
Sportakademklub Moscow (III)	1–3	Torpedo-ZIL Moscow
Nara-ShBFR Naro-Fominsk (III)	2–0	Spartak Shchyolkovo (III)
Sheksna Cherepovets (III)	0–1	Spartak Kostroma
Torpedo Vladimir (III)	3–0	Tekstilshchik Ivanovo

=== Section Center ===
Team 1	Score	Team 2
Rusichi Oryol	1–0	Dynamo Bryansk (III)
Avangard Podolsk	1–0	Nika Moscow
FC Ryazan	1–3	Zvezda Serpukhov (III)
Saturn-2 Moscow Oblast (III)	3–1 (a.e.t.)	Zorky Krasnogorsk
Fakel-Voronezh Voronezh	1–2	Avangard Kursk (III)
FC Gubkin (III)	0–1	Zodiak-Oskol Stary Oskol

=== Section South ===
Team 1	Score	Team 2
FC Volgograd	2–1	Dagdizel Kaspiysk
Bataysk-2007	2–2 (a.e.t.) (4–3 p)	SKA Rostov-on-Don
Zhemchuzhina Sochi	1–0	Krasnodar-2000
Mashuk-KMV Pyatigorsk	1–2	FC Stavropol

=== Section Ural-Povolzhye ===
Team 1	Score	Team 2
Sokol-Saratov Saratov	0–2	Mordovia Saransk
Khimik Dzerzhinsk	3–1	SOYUZ-Gazprom Izhevsk
Rubin-2 Kazan	0–1	Gazovik Orenburg
FC Chelyabinsk	2–0	Gornyak Uchaly

=== Section East ===
Team 1	Score	Team 2
KUZBASS Kemerovo	2–3 (a.e.t.)	Dynamo Barnaul (III)
Metallurg-Kuzbass Novokuznetsk (III)	1–2	Metallurg Krasnoyarsk
Amur Blagoveshchensk (III)	3–1	Smena Komsomolsk-na-Amure (III)
Sakhalin Yuzhno-Sakhalinsk (III)	1–0	Okean Nakhodka (III)

== Fourth round ==
In this round entered 24 winners from the Third Round teams. The matches were played between 5 June and 18 June 2009.

=== Section West ===
Team 1	Score	Team 2
Volga Tver	1–0 (a.e.t.)	Pskov-747 Pskov
Torpedo-ZIL Moscow	3–0	Nara-ShBFR Naro-Fominsk
Spartak Kostroma	0–1	Torpedo Vladimir

=== Section Center ===
Team 1	Score	Team 2
Avangard Podolsk	3–1	Rusichi Oryol
Zvezda Serpukhov	0–3	Saturn-2 Moscow Oblast
Avangard Kursk	0–0 (a.e.t.) (5–4 p)	Zodiak-Oskol Stary Oskol

=== Section South ===
Team 1	Score	Team 2
Bataysk-2007	1–2 (a.e.t.)	FC Volgograd
Zhemchuzhina Sochi	4–0	FC Stavropol

=== Section Ural-Povolzhye ===
Team 1	Score	Team 2
Mordovia Saransk	2–1	Khimik Dzerzhinsk
FC Chelyabinsk	4–1	Gazovik Orenburg

=== Section East ===
Team 1	Score	Team 2
Dynamo Barnaul	3–0	Metallurg Krasnoyarsk
Amur Blagoveshchensk	2–2 (a.e.t.) (4–3 p)	Sakhalin Yuzhno-Sakhalinsk

== Fifth round ==
In this round entered 12 winners from the Fourth Round teams and the 20 First Division teams. The matches were played on 1 July 2009.

Team 1	Score	Team 2
Volga Tver (III)	1–0	MVD Rossii Moscow (II)
Torpedo-ZIL Moscow (III)	0–3	Baltika Kaliningrad (II)
Torpedo Vladimir (III)	1–0	Shinnik Yaroslavl (II)
Saturn-2 Moscow Oblast (III)	2–3	FC Nizhny Novgorod (II)
Avangard Kursk (III)	2–0	Vityaz Podolsk (II)
Avangard Podolsk (III)	1–0	Metallurg Lipetsk (II)
FC Krasnodar (II)	1–0 (a.e.t.)	Chernomorets Novorossiysk (II)
FC Volgograd (III)	0–1	Salyut-Energia Belgorod (II)
Zhemchuzhina Sochi (III)	1–2	Volgar-Gazprom-2 Astrakhan (II)
Alania Vladikavkaz (II)	3–0	Anzhi Makhachkala (II)
FC Chelyabinsk (III)	2–1	KAMAZ Naberezhnye Chelny (II)
Mordovia Saransk (III)	2–1	Volga Nizhny Novgorod (II)
Nosta Novotroitsk (II)	1–2	Ural Sverdlovsk Oblast (II)
Dynamo Barnaul (III)	0–2	Sibir Novosibirsk (II)
SKA-Energiya Khabarovsk (II)	1–0	FC Chita (II)
Amur Blagoveshchensk (III)	1–4	Luch-Energiya Vladivostok (II)

Note: Roman numerals in brackets denote the league tier the clubs participate in during the 2009 season.

== Round of 32 ==
In this round entered 16 winners from the Fifth Round teams and the all Premier League teams. The matches were played on 15 July 2009.

15 July 2009	SKA-Energiya Khabarovsk (II)	2–1	Lokomotiv Moscow	Khabarovsk
19:00 VLAST	Konovalov 35'; Garbuz 44'		Mujiri 52' (pen.)	Stadium: Lenin Stadium; Referee: Nikolai Ivanov

15 July 2009	Luch-Energiya Vladivostok (II)	3–0	Saturn Moscow Oblast	Vladivostok
19:00 VLAST	Mikhalyov 21', 28'; Dedechko 83'			Stadium: Dynamo Stadium; Referee: Aleksandr Gvardis

15 July 2009	Sibir Novosibirsk (II)	1–0	Kuban Krasnodar	Novosibirsk
19:00 OMST	Molosh 82' (pen.)			Stadium: Spartak Stadium; Referee: Aleksandr Kolobayev

15 July 2009	FC Chelyabinsk (III)	2–1	Krylia Sovetov Samara	Chelyabinsk
18:30 YEKST	Nizovtsev 21'; N. Sergiyenko 26'		Savin 48'	Stadium: Central Stadium; Referee: Sergei Karasev

15 July 2009	Ural Sverdlovsk Oblast (II)	1–0	CSKA Moscow	Yekaterinburg
19:00 YEKST	Shishelov 56'			Stadium: Uralmash Stadium; Referee: Vladimir Kazmenko

15 July 2009	Mordovia Saransk (III)	2–1	Terek Grozny	Saransk
18:00 MSD	Zaytsev 68'; Sysuyev 79' (pen.)		Iliev 75'	Stadium: Start Stadium; Referee: Vyacheslav Kharlamov

15 July 2009	Volga Tver (III)	4–3 (a.e.t.)	Rubin Kazan	Tver
18:30 MSD	Belov 54'; Dmitry Novitsky 80'; Petrenko 97'; Sapogov 108'		Portnyagin 23', 34'; Tomas 111'	Stadium: Khimik Stadium; Referee: Yuri Rubtsov

15 July 2009	Avangard Kursk (III)	1–2	Amkar Perm	Kursk
18:30 MSD	Sinyayev 49'		Peev 8'; Sikimić 10'	Stadium: Trudovye Rezervy Stadium; Referee: Sergey Kuznetsov

15 July 2009	Avangard Podolsk (III)	4–2	FC Rostov	Podolsk
18:30 MSD	Merkulov 11'; Artyom Kuzmichyov 16'; Khrapov 61'; Chesnokov 87'		Kuznetsov 5'; Astafyev 39'	Stadium: Trud Stadium; Referee: Aleksei Yeskov

15 July 2009	Volgar-Gazprom-2 Astrakhan (II)	2–0	Dynamo Moscow	Astrakhan
18:30 MSD	Sannikov 69'; Nikolayev 70'			Stadium: Central Stadium; Referee: Mikail Vilkov

15 July 2009	Torpedo Vladimir (III)	0–2	Zenit St. Petersburg	Vladimir
19:00 MSD			Zyryanov 34'; Pogrebnyak 45' (pen.)	Stadium: Torpedo stadium Referee: Maksim Layushkin

15 July 2009	FC Nizhny Novgorod (II)	2–0 (a.e.t.)	Spartak Nalchik	Nizhny Novgorod
19:00 MSD	Vasin 102'; Govorov 110'			Stadium: Severny Stadium; Referee: Yevgeni Turbin

15 July 2009	Alania Vladikavkaz (II)	1–0	Tom Tomsk	Vladikavkaz
19:00 MSD	Dadu 79'			Stadium: Republican Spartak Stadium; Referee: Yuri Baskakov

15 July 2009	FC Krasnodar (II)	1–2	Spartak Moscow	Krasnodar
20:00 MSD	Tsukanov 90+3'		Maloyan 74'; Ananidze 90'	Stadium: Kuban Stadium; Referee: Ildus Biglov

15 July 2009	Salyut-Energia Belgorod (II)	0–2	FC Moscow	Belgorod
20:00 MSD			Tarasov 86'; Česnauskis 90+5'	Stadium: Salyut Stadium; Referee: Vyacheslav Popov

15 July 2009	Baltika Kaliningrad (II)	2–1	FC Khimki	Kaliningrad
19:30 USZ1S	Kolomiychenko 36'; Revyakin 65'		Pylypchuk 35'	Stadium: Baltika Stadium; Referee: Mikhail Belov

Note: Roman numerals in brackets denote the league tier the clubs participate in during the 2009 season.

== Round of 16 ==
The matches were played on 5 August 2009.

5 August 2009	Luch-Energiya Vladivostok (II)	2–1 (a.e.t.)	SKA-Energiya Khabarovsk (II)	Vladivostok
19:00 VLAST	Mamaev 61', 100'		Karmazinenko 64'	Stadium: Dynamo Stadium; Referee: Sergei Karasev

5 August 2009	FC Chelyabinsk (III)	0–2	Mordovia Saransk (III)	Chelyabinsk
18:30 YEKST			R. Mukhametshin 28', 29'	Stadium: Central Stadium; Referee: Mikhail Belov

5 August 2009	Amkar Perm	2–1	Avangard Podolsk (III)	Perm
19:00 YEKST	Zhilyayev 31'; Novaković 84'		Duyun 33'	Stadium: Zvezda Stadium; Referee: Vyacheslav Popov

5 August 2009	Ural Sverdlovsk Oblast (II)	1–2	Sibir Novosibirsk (II)	Yekaterinburg
19:00 YEKST	Gerk 63'		Medvedev 49' (pen.); Lipatkin 60'	Stadium: Uralmash Stadium; Referee: Yuri Baskakov

5 August 2009	Volga Tver (III)	2–2 (a.e.t.) (4–2 p)	Baltika Kaliningrad (II)	Tver
18:30 MSD	Vladimir Uzoykin 7'; Sapogov 77'		Revyakin 26'; Korovushkin 41'	Stadium: Khimik Stadium; Referee: Aleksei Yeskov
	Penalties
	Vladimir Uzoykin (penalty scored); Sapogov (penalty missed); Stolbovoy (penalty scored); Petrenko (penalty scored); Agaev (penalty scored)		(penalty missed) Golubov; (penalty scored) Trusevych; (penalty missed) Kenkishvili; (penalty scored) Okorochkov

5 August 2009	Spartak Moscow	1–2	FC Moscow	Moscow
19:00 MSD	Makeyev 9'		Česnauskis 27'; Strelkov 75'	Stadium: Luzhniki Stadium; Referee: Maksim Layushkin

5 August 2009	Alania Vladikavkaz (II)	2–1 (a.e.t.)	Volgar-Gazprom-2 Astrakhan (II)	Vladikavkaz
19:00 MSD	Dadu 51'; Godunok 105'		Nesterenko 80'	Stadium: Republican Spartak Stadium; Referee: Vladislav Bezborodov

5 August 2009	Zenit St. Petersburg	2–1 (a.e.t.)	FC Nizhny Novgorod (II)	Saint Petersburg
19:30 MSD	Rosina 39'; Križanac 97'		Zyuzin 82'	Stadium: Petrovsky Stadium; Referee: Vitali Doroshenko

Note: Roman numerals in brackets denote the league tier the clubs participate in during the 2009 season.

== Quarter-finals ==
The matches were played on 7 April 2010. Amkar Perm was awarded a walkover after FC Moscow were relegated to the amateur league.

7 April 2010	Mordovia Saransk (II)	0–3	Alania Vladikavkaz	Saransk
18:00 MSD		Report	J. Bazayev 26'; Kuznetsov 59'; G. Bazayev 88'	Stadium: Svetotekhnika Stadium; Attendance: 15,000; Referee: Aleksei Yeskov

7 April 2010	Sibir Novosibirsk	3–0	Luch-Energiya Vladivostok (II)	Novosibirsk
19:00 OMST	Bliznyuk 51', 54' (pen.); Astafyev 69'	Report		Stadium: Spartak Stadium; Attendance: 7,000; Referee: Aleksei Nikolayev

7 April 2010	Zenit Saint Petersburg	2–0	Volga Tver (III)	Saint Petersburg
19:30 MSD	Huszti 25' (pen.); Bystrov 69'	Report		Stadium: Petrovsky Stadium; Attendance: 20,500; Referee: Mikhail Vilkov

FC Moscow (amateur)	w/o	Amkar Perm

Note: Roman numerals in brackets denote the league tier the clubs participate in during the 2010 season.

== Semi-finals ==
The matches were played on 21 April 2010.

21 April 2010	Sibir Novosibirsk	3–0	Alania Vladikavkaz	Novosibirsk
19:00 OMST	Medvedev 14', 67', 90'	Report		Stadium: Spartak Stadium; Attendance: 12,000; Referee: Stanislav Sukhina

21 April 2010	Amkar Perm	0–0 (a.e.t.) (2–4 p)	Zenit Saint Petersburg	Perm
19:00 YEKST		Report		Stadium: Zvezda Stadium; Attendance: 15,400; Referee: Yuri Baskakov
	Penalties
	Peev (penalty scored); Topchu (penalty scored); Popov (penalty missed); Belorukov (penalty missed)		(penalty scored) Kerzhakov; (penalty scored) Shirokov; (penalty scored) Danny; (penalty scored) Lazović

== Final ==
The match was played on 16 May 2010.

16 May 2010
14:00 MSD

Zenit Saint Petersburg	1–0	Sibir Novosibirsk (II)
Shirokov 60' (pen.)	Report

Olimp – 2, Rostov-on-Don
Attendance: 15,000
Referee: Aleksandr Kolobayev (Moscow)

Zenit	Sibir

GK	16	(Russia) Vyacheslav Malafeev
CB	14	(Slovakia) Tomáš Hubočan
CB	4	(Croatia) Ivica Križanac	(yellow card) 42'
CB	6	(Belgium) Nicolas Lombaerts
DM	27	(Russia) Igor Denisov
CM	18	(Russia) Konstantin Zyryanov		(substituted off) 80'
CM	15	(Russia) Roman Shirokov
RW	34	(Russia) Vladimir Bystrov		(substituted off) 90'
AM	10	(Portugal) Danny
LW	2	(Russia) Aleksandr Anyukov (c)	(yellow card) 78'
CF	11	(Russia) Aleksandr Kerzhakov		(substituted off) 83'
Substitutes:
GK	30	(Belarus) Yuri Zhevnov
DF	5	(Portugal) Fernando Meira
DF	28	(Denmark) Michael Lumb
MF	17	(Italy) Alessandro Rosina		(substituted on) 90'
MF	20	(Russia) Viktor Fayzulin		(substituted on) 80'
MF	23	(Hungary) Szabolcs Huszti
FW	99	(Russia) Maksim Kanunnikov		(substituted on) 83'
Manager:
(Italy) Luciano Spalletti Assistant referees: Vitali Drozdov (Moscow); Sergei Khraltsov (Moscow); Fourth official: Vladimir Kazmenko (Rostov-on-Don)

GK	30	(Poland) Wojciech Kowalewski	(yellow card) 65'
CB	24	(Lithuania) Arūnas Klimavičius		(substituted off) 75'
CB	17	(Russia) Denis Bukhryakov
CB	22	(Belarus) Egor Filipenko	(yellow card) 75'
DM	8	(Russia) Aleksandr Makarenko
RM	21	(Serbia) Nikola Valentić	(yellow card) 11'
LM	3	(Belarus) Dmitry Molosh
AM	11	(Czech Republic) Tomáš Čížek		(substituted off) 61'
RF	27	(Russia) Aleksei Aravin	(yellow card) 85'
CF	13	(Russia) Aleksei Medvedev (c)
LF	14	(Russia) Aleksandr Degtyaryov		(substituted off) 71'
Substitutes:
GK	1	(Russia) Aleksei Solosin
MF	14	(Russia) Ivan Nagibin		(substituted on) 75'
MF	20	(Russia) Aleksandr Shulenin
MF	54	(Russia) Aleksei Vasilyev		(substituted on) 61'
MF	91	(Russia) Aleksandr Shumov
FW	9	(Russia) Aleksandr Antipenko	(yellow card) 87'	(substituted on) 71'
FW	99	(Russia) Igor Shevchenko
Manager:
(Belarus) Igor Kriushenko

Played in the earlier stages, but not in the final:

FC Zenit Saint Petersburg: (Slovakia) Kamil Čontofalský (GK), (South Korea) Kim Dong-jin (DF), (Czech Republic) Radek Šírl (DF), Aleksei Ionov (MF), Igor Semshov (MF), (Belarus) Syarhey Karnilenka (FW), (Serbia) Danko Lazović (FW), Pavel Pogrebnyak (FW).

FC Sibir Novosibirsk: (Serbia) Nenad Erić (GK), Sergei Chepchugov (GK), Roman Amirkhanov (DF), (Czech Republic) Tomáš Vychodil (DF), Kirill Orlov (DF), Nikolai Samoylov (DF), Maksim Astafyev (MF), Aleksandr Vasilyev (MF), Yevgeni Zinovyev (MF), Denis Laktionov (MF), Nikolay Lipatkin (MF), (Lithuania) Mantas Savėnas (MF), Roman Belyayev (FW), (Belarus) Gennadi Bliznyuk (FW), (North Macedonia) Goran Stankovski (FW), Sergei Shumilin (FW).
