= 2010 FC Lokomotiv Moscow season =

Lokomotiv Moscow
2010 season
- Chairman: Olga Smorodskaya
- Manager: Yuri Semin
- Stadium: Luzhniki Stadium
- Russian Premier League: 5th
- Russian Cup: Round of 32 vs Gornyak Uchaly
- Europa League: Play-off round vs Lausanne-Sport
- Top goalscorer: League: Oleksandr Aliyev (14); All: Oleksandr Aliyev (15)
Home colours	Away colours

The 2010 Lokomotiv season was the 18th successive season that Lokomotiv played in the Russian Premier League, the highest tier of association football in Russia. They finished the season in 5th place, qualifying for the 2011–12 UEFA Europa League, were knocked out of the Russian Cup by Gornyak Uchaly at the Round of 32 stage, and knocked out of the 2010–11 UEFA Europa League by Lausanne-Sport on penalties at the playoff stage.

== Squad ==
Note: Flags indicate national team as defined under FIFA eligibility rules; some limited exceptions apply. Players may hold more than one non-FIFA nationality.

No.	Pos.	Nation	Player
1	GK	BRA	Guilherme
4	DF	BRA	Rodolfo (vice-captain)
7	MF	RUS	Dmitri Tarasov
8	MF	RUS	Denis Glushakov
10	MF	RUS	Dmitri Loskov (captain)
11	FW	RUS	Dmitri Sychev (vice-captain)
13	MF	BRA	Wágner
14	MF	RUS	Igor Smolnikov
15	MF	GHA	Haminu Draman
16	MF	BRA	Charles
17	DF	RUS	Dmitri Sennikov
19	FW	MLI	Dramane Traoré
20	DF	SLO	Branko Ilić
21	MF	RUS	Dmitri Torbinski

No.	Pos.	Nation	Player
22	GK	RUS	Aleksandr Krivoruchko
23	DF	MNE	Marko Baša
27	MF	RUS	Magomed Ozdoyev
28	DF	SVK	Ján Ďurica
30	DF	GEO	Malkhaz Asatiani (vice-captain)
32	GK	CZE	Marek Čech
44	DF	RUS	Ruslan Kambolov
49	DF	RUS	Roman Shishkin
55	DF	RUS	Renat Yanbayev
81	MF	RUS	Alan Gatagov
88	MF	UKR	Oleksandr Aliyev
90	FW	BRA	Maicon
99	DF	RUS	Taras Burlak

=== Players on loan ===
Note: Flags indicate national team as defined under FIFA eligibility rules; some limited exceptions apply. Players may hold more than one non-FIFA nationality.

No.	Pos.	Nation	Player
33	GK	BLR	Artem Gomelko (at (Belarus) Naftan Novopolotsk)
38	MF	RUS	Denis Voynov (at (Russia) Lokomotiv-2 Moscow)
—	FW	SEN	Baye Djiby Fall (at (Norway) Molde)

No.	Pos.	Nation	Player
—	FW	RUS	Semyon Fomin (at (Russia) Lokomotiv-2 Moscow)
—	MF	MDA	Stanislav Ivanov (at (Russia) Rostov)

== Transfers ==
=== Winter ===
In: Note: Flags indicate national team as defined under FIFA eligibility rules; some limited exceptions apply. Players may hold more than one non-FIFA nationality.

No.	Pos.	Nation	Player
7	MF	RUS	Dmitri Tarasov (from (Russia) FC Moscow)
14	DF	RUS	Igor Smolnikov (loan return from (Russia) FC Chita)
15	FW	GHA	Haminu Draman (loan return from (Russia) Kuban Krasnodar)
19	FW	MLI	Dramane Traoré (loan return from (Russia) Kuban Krasnodar)
20	DF	SLO	Branko Ilić (from (Spain) Real Betis)
27	DF	RUS	Magomed Ozdoyev (from (Ukraine) Dynamo Kyiv)
88	MF	UKR	Oleksandr Aliyev (from (Ukraine) Dynamo Kyiv)
90	FW	BRA	Maicon (from (Brazil) Fluminense)
99	DF	RUS	Taras Burlak (loan return from (Russia) Volga)

Out: Note: Flags indicate national team as defined under FIFA eligibility rules; some limited exceptions apply. Players may hold more than one non-FIFA nationality.

No.	Pos.	Nation	Player
1	GK	RUS	Ivan Levenets
10	FW	GEO	Davit Mujiri (to (Georgia (country)) Dinamo Tbilisi)
18	MF	NGR	Sani Kaita (loan return to (France) Monaco)
19	FW	SEN	Baye Djiby Fall (loan to (Norway) Molde)
20	DF	SVK	Ján Ďurica (loan to (Germany) Hannover 96)
25	MF	ROU	Răzvan Cociș (to (Romania) Politehnica Timișoara)
31	GK	SUI	Eldin Jakupović (to (Greece) Olympiacos Volos)
45	FW	RUS	Aleksandr Minchenkov (loan to (Russia) Dynamo Bryansk)
69	DF	RUS	Sergei Yefimov (loan to (Russia) Dynamo Bryansk)

=== Summer ===
In: Note: Flags indicate national team as defined under FIFA eligibility rules; some limited exceptions apply. Players may hold more than one non-FIFA nationality.

No.	Pos.	Nation	Player
10	MF	RUS	Dmitri Loskov (from (Russia) Saturn Moscow Oblast)
28	DF	SVK	Ján Ďurica (loan return from (Germany) Hannover 96)
49	DF	RUS	Roman Shishkin (from (Russia) Spartak Moscow)

Out: Note: Flags indicate national team as defined under FIFA eligibility rules; some limited exceptions apply. Players may hold more than one non-FIFA nationality.

No.	Pos.	Nation	Player
3	DF	RUS	Oleg Kuzmin (to (Russia) Rubin Kazan)
5	MF	CRO	Tomislav Dujmović (to (Russia) Dynamo Moscow)
9	FW	NGR	Peter Odemwingie (to (England) West Bromwich Albion)
18	MF	RUS	Vladislav Ignatyev (on loan to (Russia) Kuban Krasnodar)
36	DF	RUS	Makhmadnaim Sharifi (to (Austria) Kapfenberger SV)
45	FW	RUS	Aleksandr Minchenkov (on loan to (Russia) Dynamo Bryansk)
69	DF	RUS	Sergei Yefimov (on loan to (Russia) Dynamo Bryansk)
75	DF	RUS	Pavel Novitskiy (to (Russia) Nika Moscow)
—	GK	ITA	Ivan Pelizzoli (to (Italy) Cagliari Calcio, previously on loan at (Italy) AlbinoLeffe)

== Competitions ==
=== Russian Premier League ===
==== Matches ====
14 March 2010 1	Rubin Kazan	2 – 0	Lokomotiv Moscow	Kazan
15:00 MSK (UTC+4)	Noboa (yellow card) 68'; Gorbanets 88'; Bukharov 90'	Summary	Tarasov (yellow card) 27'; Dujmović (yellow card) 63'	Stadium: Central Stadium; Attendance: 8,123; Referee: Vladislav Bezborodov

20 March 2010 2	Lokomotiv Moscow	3 – 0	Krylia Sovetov	Moscow
20:00 MSK (UTC+4)	Aliyev 50' (pen.), 57'; Sychev 54' (pen.); Charles (yellow card) 78'	Summary		Stadium: Lokomotiv Stadium; Attendance: 14,923; Referee: Vladimir Kazmenko

28 March 2010 3	Spartak Moscow	2 – 1	Lokomotiv Moscow	Moscow
14:00 MSK (UTC+4)	Suchý (yellow card) 8' (goal) 11'; Ari 18'; Ibson (yellow card) 21'; Makeyev (yellow card) 83'; Bazhenov (yellow card) 89'	Summary	Asatiani (yellow card) 12'; Aliyev 28'; Charles (yellow card) 29'; Sychev (yellow card) 39'	Stadium: Olympic Stadium; Attendance: 40,000; Referee: Maxim Layushkin

4 April 2010 4	Lokomotiv Moscow	3 – 2	Dynamo Moscow	Moscow
19:00 MSK (UTC+4)	Aliyev 45', 68' (yellow card) 55'; Sychev (yellow card) 68'; Tarasov 85'; Smolnikov (yellow card) 90'	Summary	Voronin 22' (yellow card) 77'; D.Kombarov 88' (pen.)	Stadium: Lokomotiv Stadium; Attendance: 17,820; Referee: Nikolai Ivanov

11 April 2010 5	Zenit st.Petersburg	1 – 0	Lokomotiv Moscow	Saint Petersburg
14:00 MSK (UTC+4)	Danny (yellow card) 9'; Zyryanov (yellow card) 23'; Bystrov 53' (yellow card) 80'; Hubočan (yellow card) 75'; Rosina (yellow card) 90'	Summary	Charles (yellow card) 9'; Asatiani (yellow card) 17'; Kuzmin (yellow card) 28'; Tarasov (yellow card) 78' (yellow-red card) 86'; Odemwingie (yellow card) 90'	Stadium: Petrovsky Stadium; Attendance: 20,300; Referee: Igor Egorov

17 April 2010 6	CSKA Moscow	1 – 1	Lokomotiv Moscow	Moscow
14:00 MSK (UTC+4)	Guilherme 7'; Šemberas (yellow card) 13'; Schennikov (yellow card) 70'; Necid (yellow card) 85'	Summary	Glushakov (yellow card) 12'; Odemwingie (yellow card) 74'; Maicon (yellow card) 81'; Kuzmin 89'	Stadium: Arena Khimki; Attendance: 14,000; Referee: Yuri Baskakov

2010 7	Lokomotiv Moscow	2 – 1	Tom Tomsk	Moscow
18:30 MSK (UTC+4)	Glushakov 33'; Aliyev 43'	Summary	Kornilenko 83'; Dzhioyev (yellow card) 89'	Stadium: Lokomotiv Stadium; Attendance: 13,600; Referee: Vyacheslav Popov

1 May 2010 8	Terek Grozny	0 – 0	Lokomotiv Moscow	Grozny
16:15 MSK (UTC+4)	Bracamonte (yellow card) 88'	Summary	Kuzmin (yellow card) 32'; Guilherme (yellow card) 51'; Glushakov (yellow card) 72'; Maicon (yellow card) 76'	Stadium: Sultan Bilimkhanov Stadium; Attendance: 9,000; Referee: Vladislav Bezborodov

5 May 2010 9	Lokomotiv Moscow	0 – 1	Saturn	Moscow
18:45 MSK (UTC+4)	Baša (yellow card) 74'; Smolnikov (yellow card) 76'; Dujmović (yellow card) 84'; Gatagov (yellow card) 90'	Summary	Kirichenko 51'	Stadium: Lokomotiv Stadium; Attendance: 11,118; Referee: Evgeny Turbin

11 May 2010 10	Spartak Nalchik	1 – 1	Lokomotiv Moscow	Nalchik
18:15 MSK (UTC+4)	Leandro 21'; Kontsedalov (yellow card) 82'; Kisenkov (yellow card) 85'	Summary	Dujmović 42' (yellow card) 56'; Aliyev (yellow card) 65'	Stadium: Spartak Stadium; Attendance: 9,000; Referee: Stanislav Sukhina

15 May 2010 11	Lokomotiv Moscow	2 – 0	Amkar Perm	Moscow
14:00 MSK (UTC+4)	Aliyev 17'; Tarasov (yellow card) 47'; Maicon 80'	Summary	Pomerko (yellow card) 45'	Stadium: Lokomotiv Stadium; Attendance: 11,120; Referee: Vladimir Pettay

10 July 2010 12	Lokomotiv Moscow	2 – 1	Anzhi Makhachkala	Moscow^{1}
20:30 MSK (UTC+4)	Dujmović 17' (yellow card) 90'; Aliyev 68'	Summary	Timonov (yellow card) 58'; Tagirbekov 90'	Stadium: Lokomotiv Stadium; Attendance: 3,000; Referee: Vyacheslav Popov

18 July 2010 13	Lokomotiv Moscow	3 – 0	Alania Vladikavkaz	Moscow
20:30 MSK (UTC+4)	Aliyev 15'; Sychev 45', 47'; Torbinski (yellow card) 54'; Tarasov (yellow card) 74'	Summary	Mashukov (yellow card) 45'; Goore (yellow card) 47'; Dadu (yellow card) 74'	Stadium: Lokomotiv Stadium; Attendance: 11,421; Referee: Nikolai Ivanov

25 July 2010 14	Sibir Novosibirsk	2 – 2	Lokomotiv Moscow	Spartak Stadium
14:15 MSK (UTC+4)	Molosh (yellow card) 24' (goal) 67'; Medvedev 49'; Shevchenko (yellow card) 60'; Valentić (yellow card) 63'	Summary	Aliyev 16', 31'; Dujmović (yellow card) 57'; Rodolfo (yellow card) 90'	Stadium: Novosibirsk; Attendance: 12,000; Referee: Eduard Malyi

1 August 2010 15	Lokomotiv Moscow	0 – 1	Rostov	Moscow
21:00 MSK (UTC+4)	Aliyev (yellow card) 53' (yellow-red card) 72'; Sychev (yellow card) 80'	Summary	Valikayev 35'; Amelchenko (yellow card) 84'	Stadium: Lokomotiv Stadium; Attendance: 12,500; Referee: Mikhail Vilkov

7 August 2010 16	Krylia Sovetov	0 – 0	Lokomotiv Moscow	Samara
21:00 MSK (UTC+4)	Đorđević (yellow card) 33'; Budylin (yellow card) 75'	Summary	Dujmović (yellow card) 30' (yellow-red card) 39'; Torbinski (yellow card) 41' (yellow-red card) 68'; Glushakov (yellow card) 58'	Stadium: Metallurg Stadium; Attendance: 13,757; Referee: Vyacheslav Popov

15 August 2010 17	Lokomotiv Moscow	2 – 3	Spartak Moscow	Moscow
21:20 MSK (UTC+4)	Asatiani (yellow card) 12'; Aliyev 20'; Maicon (yellow card) 59'; Sychev 87'; Rodolfo (yellow card) 90'	Summary	Welliton 18', 31', 65'; Alex (yellow card) 74'; Parshivlyuk (yellow card) 84'	Stadium: Lokomotiv Stadium; Attendance: 23,123; Referee: Alesey Nikolaev

22 August 2010 18	Dynamo Moscow	3 – 0	Lokomotiv Moscow	Khimki
16:00 MSK (UTC+4)	Samedov (yellow card) 32'; Kurányi 42', 73'; Ropotan (yellow card) 68'; Česnauskis 90'	Summary	Torbinski (yellow card) 54'; Tarasov (yellow card) 74' (yellow-red card) 87'; Yanbayev (yellow card) 84'	Stadium: Arena Khimki; Attendance: 10,224; Referee: Sergey Karasev

29 August 2010 19	Lokomotiv Moscow	0 – 3	Zenit St.Petersburg	Moscow
16:00 MSK (UTC+4)	Torbinski (yellow card) 29' (yellow-red card) 56'; Gatagov (yellow card) 45'; Aliev (yellow card) 67'	Summary	Danny 17'; Semak (yellow card) 53'; Bukharov 67'; Shirokov 78'	Stadium: Lokomotiv Stadium; Attendance: 14,187; Referee: Igor Egorov

12 September 2010 20	Lokomotiv Moscow	1 – 0	CSKA Moscow	Moscow
15:00 MSK (UTC+4)	Maicon 25' (yellow card) 26'; Guilherme (yellow card) 57'; Asatiani (red card) 70'	Summary	Mamayev (yellow card) 45'; González (red card) 70'	Stadium: Lokomotiv Stadium; Attendance: 20,608; Referee: Vladislav Bezborodov

19 September 2010 21	Tom Tomsk	1 – 1	Lokomotiv Moscow	Tomsk
14:00 MSK (UTC+4)	Kim (yellow card) 17' (yellow-red card) 67'; Yanbayev 44' (o.g.); Dzyuba (yellow card) 70'; Petković (yellow card) 90'	Summary	Gatagov 39'; Loskov (yellow card) 67'	Stadium: Trud Stadium; Attendance: 12,000; Referee: Vladimir Pettay

26 September 2010 22	Lokomotiv Moscow	2 – 1	Terek Grozny	Moscow
20:15 MSK (UTC+4)	Aliyev 3' (pen.) (yellow card) 40'; Maicon 28'	Summary	Maurício 20'; Kobenko (yellow card) 48'; Georgiev (yellow card) 58'; Ferreira (yellow card) 66'; Utsiyev (yellow card) 85'	Stadium: Lokomotiv Stadium; Attendance: 9,867; Referee: Vladimir Kazmenko

3 October 2010 23	Saturn	0 – 1	Lokomotiv Moscow	Ramenskoye
20:45 MSK (UTC+4)	Grachyov (yellow card) 62'; Kinský (yellow card) 89'	Summary	Tarasov (yellow card) 47'; Loskov (yellow card) 83' (goal) 85'; Torbinski (yellow card) 89'; Shishkin (yellow card) 90'	Stadium: Saturn Stadium; Attendance: 6,000; Referee: Alexander Gvardis

17 October 2010 24	Lokomotiv Moscow	1 – 0	Spartak Nalchik	Moscow
20:45 MSK (UTC+4)	Baša (yellow card) 21'; Ďurica (yellow card) 44'; Sychev 70'; Rodolfo (yellow card) 87'	Summary	Dyadyun (yellow card) 45'; Golić (yellow card) 55'; Dyshekov (yellow card) 90'; Vasyanovich (yellow card) 90'	Stadium: Lokomotiv Stadium; Attendance: 10,700; Referee: Igor Egorov

24 October 2010 25	Amkar Perm	1 – 2	Lokomotiv Moscow	Perm
12:00 MSK (UTC+4)	Topchu 22'; Popov (yellow card) 32'; Cherenchikov (yellow card) 78' (yellow-red card) 88'; Novaković (yellow card) 83'	Summary	Aliyev 79' (pen.); Rodolfo 89' (yellow card) 90'	Stadium: Zvezda Stadium; Attendance: 7,000; Referee: Vladimir Pettay

31 October 2010 26	Anzhi Makhachkala	0 – 1	Lokomotiv Moscow	Makhachkala^{2}
17:15 MSK (UTC+4)	Kébé (yellow card) 42'	Summary	Baša (yellow card) 34' (yellow-red card) 45'; Sychev 89'	Stadium: Dynamo Stadium; Attendance: 12,000; Referee: Mikhail Vilkov

7 November 2010 27	Alania Vladikavkaz	0 – 0	Lokomotiv Moscow	Vladikavkaz
17:30 MSK (UTC+4)	Collins (yellow card) 21'; Ivanov (yellow card) 30'; Gnanou (yellow card) 42'	Summary	Ďurica (red card) 28'; Gatagov (yellow card) 77'	Stadium: Republican Spartak Stadium; Attendance: 15,000; Referee: Eduard Malyi

14 November 2010 28	Lokomotiv Moscow	1 – 1	Sibir Novosibirsk	Moscow
17:15 MSK (UTC+4)	Aliyev (yellow card) 51'; Sychev 63'	Summary	Vychodil (yellow card) 28'; Galiullin (yellow card) 35'; Joseph-Reinette (yellow card) 65'; Molosh (yellow card) 86'	Stadium: Lokomotiv Stadium; Attendance: 12,170; Referee: Vladimir Kazmenko

20 November 2010 29	Rostov	1 – 2	Lokomotiv Moscow	Rostov-on-Don
15:00 MSK (UTC+4)	Živanović (yellow card) 22'; Blatnjak 59'; Khagush (yellow card) 75'	Summary	Sychev 53'; Rodolfo (yellow card) 53' (goal) 61'; Shishkin (yellow card) 58'; Guilherme (yellow card) 90'	Stadium: Olimp-2; Attendance: 8,200; Referee: Nikolai Ivanov

28 November 2010 30	Lokomotiv Moscow	0 – 0	Rubin Kazan	Moscow
15:00 MSK (UTC+4)	Ďurica (yellow card) 30'; Tarasov (red card) 77'	Summary	Kuzmin (yellow card) 41'; Sibaya (yellow card) 42'; Balyaikin (yellow card) 45'; Navas (yellow card) 74'; Sharonov (yellow card) 82'	Stadium: Lokomotiv Stadium; Attendance: 14,046; Referee: Vyacheslav Popov

==== League table ====
Pos	Team	Pld	W	D	L	GF	GA	GD	Pts	Qualification or relegation
3	Rubin Kazan	30	15	13	2	37	16	+21	58	Qualification to Champions League third qualifying round
4	Spartak Moscow	30	13	10	7	43	33	+10	49	Qualification to Europa League play-off round
5	Lokomotiv Moscow	30	13	9	8	34	29	+5	48	Qualification to Europa League play-off round
6	Spartak Nalchik	30	12	8	10	40	37	+3	44	
7	Dynamo Moscow	30	9	13	8	38	31	+7	40	

Source: RFPL (in Russian)
Rules for classification: 1st points; 2nd matches won; 3rd head-to-head (points, matches won, goal difference, goals scored, away goals scored); 4th goal difference; 5th goals scored; 6th away goals scored; 7th position in previous season or decision game

=== Russian Cup ===
14 July 2010 Round of 32	Gornyak Uchaly	1 – 0	Lokomotiv Moscow	Uchaly
17:00 MSK (UTC+4)	Drannikov (yellow card) 6'; Pavlov (yellow card) 50'; Tokarev 60'; Kaynov (yellow card) 67'	Summary		Stadium: Gornyak Stadium; Attendance: 3,113; Referee: Aleksandr Yegorov

=== Europa League ===
==== Play-off Round ====
19 August 2010 1st Leg	Lausanne-Sport (Switzerland)	1 – 1	(Russia) Lokomotiv Moscow	Lausanne, Switzerland
22:30 MSK (UTC+4)	Traoré 28'	Report	Tarasov (yellow card) 38'; Sychev 65'	Stadium: Stade Olympique de la Pontaise; Attendance: 11,200; Referee: Gediminas Mažeika (Lithuania)

26 August 2010 2nd leg	Lokomotiv Moscow (Russia)	1 – 1 (2 – 2 agg.) (3 – 4 p)	(Switzerland) Lausanne-Sport	Moscow, Russia
20:00 MSK (UTC+4)	Sychev (yellow card) 84'; Aliyev 85'	Report	Silvio 17'; Avanzini (yellow card) 72'	Stadium: Lokomotiv Stadium; Attendance: 11,053; Referee: Aleksandar Stavrev (Macedonia)
	Penalties
	Aliyev (penalty scored); Sychev (penalty scored); Loskov (penalty scored); Shishkin (penalty missed); Maicon (penalty missed)		(penalty scored) Silvio; (penalty scored) Carrupt; (penalty scored) Rodrigo; (penalty missed) Katz; (penalty scored) Celestini

== Squad statistics ==
=== Appearances and goals ===
No.	Pos	Nat	Player	Total		Premier League		Russian Cup		Europa League	
No.	Pos	Nat	Player	Apps	Goals	Apps	Goals	Apps	Goals	Apps	Goals
1	GK	(Brazil) BRA	Guilherme	33	0	30	0	1	0	2	0
4	DF	(Brazil) BRA	Rodolfo	18	2	10+6	2	0	0	2	0
7	MF	(Russia) RUS	Dmitri Tarasov	28	1	21+5	1	0	0	1+1	0
8	MF	(Russia) RUS	Denis Glushakov	30	1	21+7	1	1	0	1	0
10	MF	(Russia) RUS	Dmitri Loskov	15	1	11+2	1	0	0	0+2	0
11	FW	(Russia) RUS	Dmitri Sychev	30	9	27	8	1	0	2	1
13	MF	(Brazil) BRA	Wágner	15	0	7+7	0	1	0	0	0
14	MF	(Russia) RUS	Igor Smolnikov	15	0	6+8	0	1	0	0	0
15	FW	(Ghana) GHA	Haminu Draman	3	0	1+1	0	1	0	0	0
16	MF	(Brazil) BRA	Charles	4	0	3+1	0	0	0	0	0
17	DF	(Russia) RUS	Dmitri Sennikov	1	0	1	0	0	0	0	0
19	FW	(Mali) MLI	Dramane Traoré	20	0	6+11	0	1	0	1+1	0
20	DF	(Slovenia) SLO	Branko Ilić	1	0	1	0	0	0	0	0
21	MF	(Russia) RUS	Dmitri Torbinski	19	0	13+4	0	0	0	2	0
23	DF	(Montenegro) MNE	Marko Baša	24	0	22	0	1	0	1	0
27	MF	(Russia) RUS	Magomed Ozdoyev	4	0	0+3	0	1	0	0	0
28	DF	(Slovakia) SVK	Ján Ďurica	10	0	9+1	0	0	0	0	0
30	DF	(Georgia (country)) GEO	Malkhaz Asatiani	23	0	19+3	0	0	0	1	0
44	DF	(Russia) RUS	Ruslan Kambolov	1	0	1	0	0	0	0	0
49	DF	(Russia) RUS	Roman Shishkin	17	0	15	0	0	0	2	0
55	DF	(Russia) RUS	Renat Yanbayev	32	0	30	0	0	0	2	0
81	MF	(Russia) RUS	Alan Gatagov	21	1	5+13	1	1	0	1+1	0
88	MF	(Ukraine) UKR	Oleksandr Aliyev	27	15	25	14	0	0	2	1
90	FW	(Brazil) BRA	Maicon	20	3	15+3	3	0	0	1+1	0
99	DF	(Russia) RUS	Taras Burlak	5	0	1+2	0	1	0	1	0
Players away from the club on loan:
45	FW	(Russia) RUS	Aleksandr Minchenkov	1	0	0	0	1	0	0	0
Players who appeared for Lokomotiv Moscow no longer at the club:
3	DF	(Russia) RUS	Oleg Kuzmin	11	1	10	1	1	0	0	0
5	MF	(Croatia) CRO	Tomislav Dujmović	14	2	12+1	2	1	0	0	0
9	FW	(Nigeria) NGR	Peter Odemwingie	10	0	8+2	0	0	0	0	0

=== Goal Scorers ===
Place	Position	Nation	Number	Name	Russian Premier League	Russian Cup	Europa League	Total
1	MF	(Ukraine)	88	Oleksandr Aliyev	14	0	1	15
2	FW	(Russia)	11	Dmitri Sychev	8	0	1	9
3	MF	(Brazil)	90	Maicon	3	0	0	3
4	DF	(Brazil)	4	Rodolfo	2	0	0	2
4	MF	(Croatia)	5	Tomislav Dujmović	2	0	0	2
6	MF	(Russia)	7	Dmitri Tarasov	1	0	0	1
6	DF	(Russia)	3	Oleg Kuzmin	1	0	0	1
6	MF	(Russia)	8	Denis Glushakov	1	0	0	1
6	MF	(Russia)	81	Alan Gatagov	1	0	0	1
6	MF	(Russia)	10	Dmitri Loskov	1	0	0	1
				TOTALS	34	0	2	36

=== Disciplinary record ===
Number	Nation	Position	Name	Russian Premier League		Russian Cup		Europa League		Total	
Number	Nation	Position	Name	Yellow card	Red card	Yellow card	Red card	Yellow card	Red card	Yellow card	Red card
1	(Brazil)	GK	Guilherme	3	0	0	0	0	0	3	0
3	(Russia)	DF	Oleg Kuzmin	2	0	0	0	0	0	2	0
4	(Brazil)	DF	Rodolfo	5	0	0	0	0	0	5	0
5	(Croatia)	MF	Tomislav Dujmović	7	1	0	0	0	0	7	1
7	(Russia)	MF	Dmitri Tarasov	8	3	0	0	1	0	9	3
8	(Russia)	MF	Denis Glushakov	3	0	0	0	0	0	3	0
9	(Nigeria)	FW	Peter Odemwingie	2	0	0	0	0	0	2	0
10	(Russia)	MF	Dmitri Loskov	2	0	0	0	0	0	2	0
11	(Russia)	FW	Dmitri Sychev	3	0	0	0	1	0	4	0
14	(Russia)	MF	Igor Smolnikov	2	0	0	0	0	0	2	0
16	(Brazil)	MF	Charles	3	0	0	0	0	0	3	0
21	(Russia)	MF	Dmitri Torbinski	7	2	0	0	0	0	7	2
23	(Montenegro)	DF	Marko Baša	4	1	0	0	0	0	4	1
28	(Slovakia)	DF	Ján Ďurica	2	1	0	0	0	0	2	1
30	(Georgia (country))	DF	Malkhaz Asatiani	3	1	0	0	0	0	3	1
49	(Russia)	DF	Roman Shishkin	2	0	0	0	0	0	2	0
55	(Russia)	DF	Renat Yanbayev	1	0	0	0	0	0	1	0
81	(Russia)	MF	Alan Gatagov	3	0	0	0	0	0	3	0
88	(Ukraine)	MF	Oleksandr Aliyev	7	1	0	0	0	0	7	1
90	(Brazil)	MF	Maicon	4	0	0	0	0	0	4	0
			TOTALS	73	10	0	0	2	0	75	10
