= Sergei Vylezhanin =

Russian footballer and manager

Personal information
- Full name: Sergei Aleksandrovich Vylezhanin
- Date of birth: 2 February 1971 (age 55)
- Height: 1.78 m (5 ft 10 in)
- Positions: Forward; midfielder

Team information
- Current team: FC Novosibirsk (assistant coach)

Youth career
- DYuSSh-9 Olovokombinata Novosibirsk

Senior career*
Years	Team	Apps	(Gls)
1989–1997	FC Chkalovets Novosibirsk	205	(14)
1998–1999	FC Sibiryak Bratsk	58	(2)
2000–2001	FC Chkalovets-1936 Novosibirsk	27	(0)
2002	FC Shakhtyor Prokopyevsk	27	(2)
2003	FC Chkalovets-1936 Novosibirsk	3	(0)
2004	FC Sibiryak Bratsk	20	(0)
2005	FC Chkalovets Novosibirsk	26	(0)
2007	FC Sibir-NTsVSM-2 Novosibirsk		
2008	FC Sibir-3 Novosibirsk		

Managerial career
- 2006–2014: FC Sibir-2 Novosibirsk (assistant)
- 2014–2015: FC Sibir-2 Novosibirsk
- 2015–2016: FC Sibir-2 Novosibirsk (assistant)
- 2016: FC Sibir-2 Novosibirsk
- 2018–2019: FC Sibir-2 Novosibirsk
- 2019: FC Sibir Novosibirsk (assistant)
- 2019–: FC Novosibirsk (assistant)
- * Club domestic league appearances and goals

Sergei Aleksandrovich Vylezhanin (Russian: Сергей Александрович Вылежанин; born 2 February 1971) is a Russian football manager and a former player. He is an assistant coach with FC Novosibirsk.

Vylezhanin played in the Russian First Division with FC Chkalovets Novosibirsk.
