= Shumov =

Shumov (Russian: Шумов) is a Russian masculine surname, its feminine counterpart is Shumova. It may refer to:

- Aleksandr Shumov (born 1991), Russian football player
- Ilya Shumov, (1819–1881) Russian chess master
- Konstantin Shumov (born 1985), Finnish volleyball player
- Nadezhda Ziber-Shumova (died 1914), Russian chemist
- Vasily Shumov (born 1960), Russian/American artist
