= Kirill Kopayev =

Russian footballer

Personal information
- Full name: Kirill Sergeyevich Kopayev
- Date of birth: 8 January 1997 (age 29)
- Place of birth: Novosibirsk, Russia
- Height: 1.85 m (6 ft 1 in)
- Position: Centre back

Senior career*
Years	Team	Apps	(Gls)
2017–2019	FC Sibir Novosibirsk	13	(0)
2018–2019	→ FC Sibir-2 Novosibirsk	11	(0)
2019–2020	FC Novosibirsk	3	(0)
- * Club domestic league appearances and goals

Kirill Sergeyevich Kopayev (Russian: Кирилл Сергеевич Копаев; born 8 January 1997) is a Russian former football player.

== Club career ==
He made his debut in the Russian Professional Football League for FC Sibir-2 Novosibirsk on 7 August 2018 in a game against FC Sakhalin Yuzhno-Sakhalinsk.

He made his Russian Football National League debut for FC Sibir Novosibirsk on 1 September 2018 in a game against FC Tambov.
