= Artyom Dudolev =

Russian football player

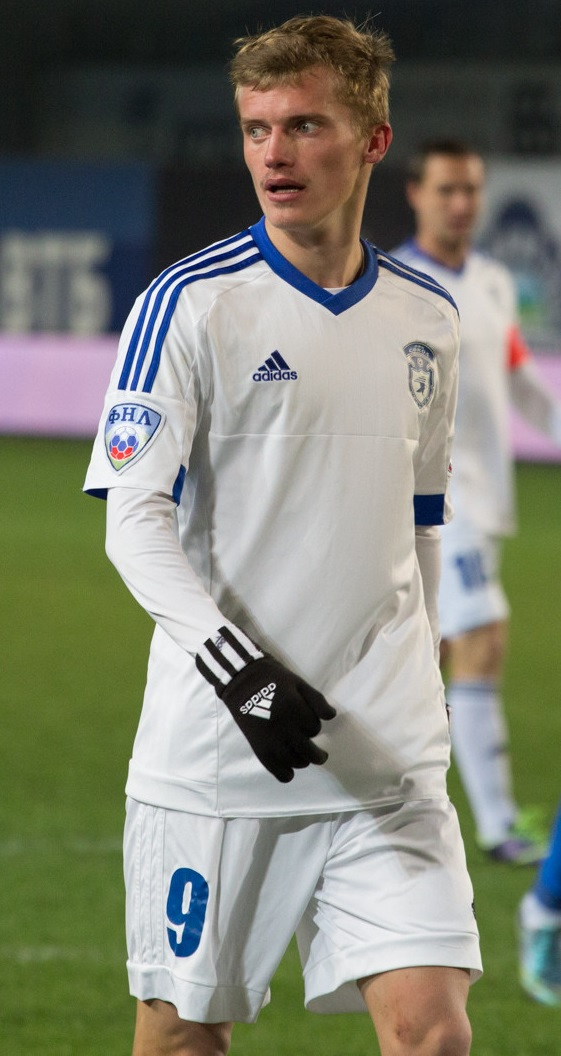
- Dudolev with Sokol Saratov in 2016

Personal information
- Full name: Artyom Filippovich Dudolev
- Date of birth: 30 September 1991 (age 35)
- Place of birth: Saint Petersburg, Russian SFSR
- Height: 1.69 m (5 ft 7 in)
- Positions: Midfielder; striker

Senior career*
Years	Team	Apps	(Gls)
2010	FC Sibir Novosibirsk	0	(0)
2011–2012	FC Sibir-2 Novosibirsk	51	(7)
2013–2015	FC Sibir Novosibirsk	56	(4)
2015–2016	FC Arsenal Tula	16	(2)
2016–2017	FC Sokol Saratov	35	(4)
2017–2019	FC Sibir Novosibirsk	32	(1)
2018–2019	→ FC Sibir-2 Novosibirsk	9	(1)
- * Club domestic league appearances and goals

Artyom Filippovich Dudolev (Russian: Артём Филиппович Дудолев; born 30 September 1991) is a Russian former football player.

== Club career ==
He made his debut in the Russian Second Division for FC Sibir-2 Novosibirsk on 23 April 2011 in a game against FC KUZBASS Kemerovo.

He made his Russian Football National League debut for FC Sibir Novosibirsk on 1 April 2013 in a game against FC Shinnik Yaroslavl.
