= Leonid Zuyev =

Russian footballer

Leonid Zuev
Personal information
- Full name: Leonid Zuev
- Date of birth: 12 January 1991 (age 35)
- Height: 1.75 m (5 ft 9 in)
- Position: Midfielder

Senior career*
Years	Team	Apps	(Gls)
2008	FC Sibir-2 Novosibirsk	26	(3)
2009–2011	FC Sibir Novosibirsk	7	(0)
2011	FC Sibir-2 Novosibirsk	11	(6)
2012–2013	FC Sibir Novosibirsk	6	(0)
2013–2015	FC Chita	61	(8)
- * Club domestic league appearances and goals

Leonid Zuev (Russian: Леонид; born 12 January 1991) is a former Russian professional footballer.

He made his professional debut in the Russian Second Division in 2008 for FC Sibir-2 Novosibirsk.
