= Artyom Kabanov =

Russian footballer

Personal information
- Full name: Artyom Yuryevich Kabanov
- Date of birth: 20 January 1984 (age 42)
- Height: 1.81 m (5 ft 11 1/2 in)
- Position: Midfielder

Senior career*
Years	Team	Apps	(Gls)
2002–2007	FC Sibir Novosibirsk	32	(3)
2007	FC Amur Blagoveshchensk	22	(2)
2008	FC Sibir-2 Novosibirsk	22	(4)
2009	FC Sibir Novosibirsk	0	(0)
2011–2012	FC Sibir-Zarya-M Novosibirsk		
2012–2014	FC Sibir Novosibirsk	26	(0)
- * Club domestic league appearances and goals

Artyom Yuryevich Kabanov (Russian: Артём Юрьевич Кабанов; born 20 January 1984) is a former Russian professional footballer.

== Club career ==
He played 3 seasons in the Russian Football National League for FC Sibir Novosibirsk.
