= Ivan Stain =

Russian footballer

Personal information
- Full name: Ivan Nikolayevich Stain
- Date of birth: 7 February 1989 (age 37)
- Place of birth: Sverdlovsk, USSR
- Height: 1.82 m (5 ft 11 1/2 in)
- Position: Defender

Youth career
- PFC Krylia Sovetov Samara

Senior career*
Years	Team	Apps	(Gls)
2006–2007	FC Krylia Sovetov-SOK Dimitrovgrad	33	(0)
2008	FC Togliatti	29	(1)
2009	FC Nizhny Novgorod	1	(0)
2010	FC Tranzit	2	(0)
2010	FC Sibir Novosibirsk	0	(0)
2011	FC Sibir-2 Novosibirsk	27	(0)
2012–2013	FC Sibir-2 Novosibirsk	25	(1)
2013–2014	FC Chita	18	(0)
- * Club domestic league appearances and goals

Ivan Nikolayevich Stain (Russian: Иван Николаевич Стаин; born 7 February 1989) is a former Russian professional football player.

== Club career ==
He played in the Russian Football National League for FC Nizhny Novgorod in 2009.
