= Roman Belyayev =

Russian professional footballer

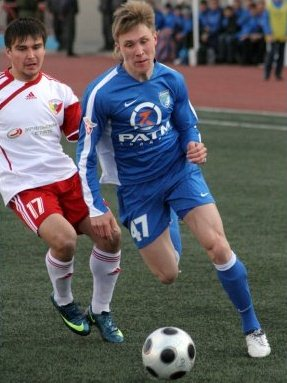
- Roman Belyayev in 2011

Personal information
- Full name: Roman Yevgenyevich Belyayev
- Date of birth: 14 February 1988 (age 38)
- Place of birth: Novosibirsk, Russian SFSR
- Height: 1.80 m (5 ft 11 in)
- Positions: Midfielder; forward

Youth career
- FC Sibir Novosibirsk

Senior career*
Years	Team	Apps	(Gls)
2007–2008	FC Sibir Novosibirsk	1	(0)
2008	FC Sibir-2 Novosibirsk	25	(9)
2009–2019	FC Sibir Novosibirsk	194	(22)
2009	→ FC Chita (loan)	7	(0)
2019–2021	FC Novosibirsk	25	(8)
2021–2022	FC Murom	26	(5)
- * Club domestic league appearances and goals

Roman Yevgenyevich Belyayev (Russian: Роман Евгеньевич Беляев; born 14 February 1988) is a Russian former professional footballer.

== Club career ==
He made his professional debut in the Russian First Division in 2007 for FC Sibir Novosibirsk. In the 2009 Belyayev was sent to FC Chita on loan. He returned the same season.

On 2 August 2010, he made his Russian Premier League debut for Sibir, in a game against FC Tom Tomsk. Prior to that, he made three appearances for Sibir in the Europa League qualifiers against Apollon Limassol and PSV Eindhoven.
