= Aleksandr Mineyev =

Russian footballer

Personal information
- Full name: Aleksandr Andreyevich Mineyev
- Date of birth: 1 January 1988 (age 38)
- Height: 1.72 m (5 ft 7 1/2 in)
- Positions: Midfielder; defender

Senior career*
| Years | Team | Apps | (Gls) |
| 2005–2006 | Cementarnica 55 | | |
| 2006–2007 | Bregalnica Kraun | | |
| 2007 | FC Rostov | 0 | (0) |
| 2008–2009 | FC MVD Rossii Moscow | 47 | (6) |
| 2009–2010 | FC Sibir Novosibirsk | 6 | (0) |
| 2010 | FC SKA-Energiya Khabarovsk | 8 | (0) |
| 2011 | FC Petrotrest Saint Petersburg | 17 | (1) |
| 2011 | FC Mostovik-Primorye Ussuriysk | 6 | (0) |
| 2012 | FC Sokol Saratov | 8 | (0) |
| 2013–2014 | FC Baikal Irkutsk | 12 | (1) |
- * Club domestic league appearances and goals

Aleksandr Andreyevich Mineyev (Russian: Александр Андреевич Минеев; born 11 January 1988) is a former Russian professional football player.

== Club career ==
At the start of his senior career he played in the Macedonian First League, first with FK Cementarnica 55 in the second half of the 2005–06 season, and then with FK Bregalnica Kraun in the following season.

He played two seasons in the Russian Football National League for FC MVD Rossii Moscow, FC Sibir Novosibirsk and FC SKA-Energiya Khabarovsk.
