= Aleksandr Vasilyev (footballer, born 1980) =

Russian footballer

Personal information
- Full name: Aleksandr Nikolayevich Vasilyev
- Date of birth: 29 August 1980 (age 46)
- Height: 1.73 m (5 ft 8 in)
- Position: Midfielder

Youth career
- FC Torpedo-ZIL Moscow

Senior career*
Years	Team	Apps	(Gls)
2000	FC Lotto-MKM Moscow	28	(2)
2001	FC Torpedo-ZIL Moscow	0	(0)
2001	FC Krasnoznamensk	21	(5)
2002	FC Kuzbass-Dynamo Kemerovo	26	(1)
2003–2004	FC Metallurg-Kuzbass Novokuznetsk	67	(12)
2005–2006	FC Sibir Novosibirsk	73	(15)
2007	FC Shinnik Yaroslavl	27	(1)
2008–2009	FC Sibir Novosibirsk	43	(3)
2009	FC Luch-Energiya Vladivostok	8	(0)
2010	FC Metallurg-Yenisey Krasnoyarsk	28	(2)
2011	FC Ufa	22	(1)

Managerial career
- 2012–2018: Academy Lokomotiv Moscow
- 2018–2021: Academy Dynamo Moscow
- 2021: FC Dynamo Moscow (U21)
- 2021: FC Dynamo Moscow (U19)
- 2022: Academy Dynamo Moscow
- 2022: FC Torpedo Moscow (U21 assistant)
- * Club domestic league appearances and goals

Aleksandr Nikolayevich Vasilyev (Russian: Александр Николаевич Васильев; born 29 August 1980) is a Russian professional football coach and a former player.

== Club career ==
He played 8 seasons in the Russian Football National League for 4 different teams.
