= Valentin Okorochkov =

Russian footballer and coach

Personal information
- Full name: Valentin Sergeyevich Okorochkov
- Date of birth: 19 March 1980 (age 46)
- Place of birth: Oryol, Russian SFSR
- Height: 1.72 m (5 ft 7 1/2 in)
- Position: Midfielder

Youth career
- SDYuShOR-3 Oryol

Senior career*
Years	Team	Apps	(Gls)
1997–1999	FC Mozdok	39	(12)
1999–2003	FC Kuban Krasnodar	136	(17)
2004–2005	FC Fakel Voronezh	45	(4)
2005	FC Avangard Kursk	15	(4)
2006	FC Fakel Voronezh	21	(1)
2006	FC Salyut-Energia Belgorod	19	(1)
2007	FC Kuban Krasnodar	1	(0)
2008	FC Chernomorets Novorossiysk	35	(6)
2009	FC Baltika Kaliningrad	34	(0)
2010–2012	FC Chernomorets Novorossiysk	55	(10)
2012	FC Oryol	12	(0)

Managerial career
- 2014–2015: FC Oryol (assistant)
- 2019–2020: FC Lokomotiv Moscow (academy)
- 2020–2023: FC Chertanovo Moscow (academy)
- 2024–2025: FC Chelyabinsk (assistant)
- 2025: FC Khimki-M
- * Club domestic league appearances and goals

Valentin Sergeyevich Okorochkov (Russian: Валентин Серге́евич Окорочков; born 19 March 1980) is a Russian professional football coach and a former player.

== Playing career ==
He made his debut in the Russian Premier League in 2007 for FC Kuban Krasnodar.

== Honours ==
- Russian Second Division, Zone South best midfielder: 2010.
