= Aleksandr Antipenko =

Russian footballer

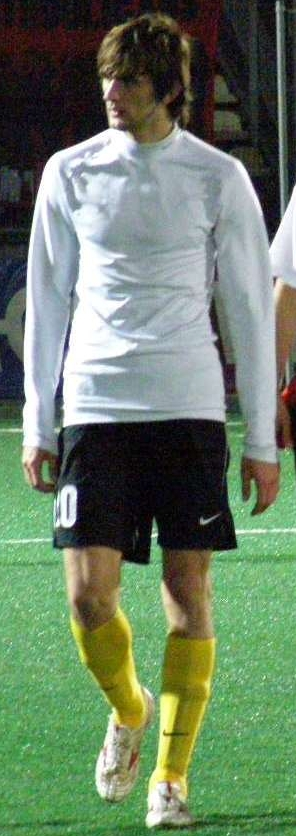

Personal information
- Full name: Aleksandr Valeryevich Antipenko
- Date of birth: 27 May 1982 (age 44)
- Place of birth: Komsomolsk-on-Amur, Soviet Union
- Height: 1.96 m (6 ft 5 in)
- Position: Forward

Youth career
- DYuSSh #3 Komsomolsk-on-Amur

Senior career*
Years	Team	Apps	(Gls)
2002	FC MIKA	7	(2)
2002–2003	FC Kristall Smolensk	24	(13)
2003–2009	FC Khimki	105	(20)
2004	→ FC Tom Tomsk (loan)	37	(15)
2006	→ FC Anzhi Makhachkala (loan)	37	(14)
2010	FC Sibir Novosibirsk	19	(1)
2011–2013	FC Volgar Astrakhan	57	(11)
2013–2014	FC Fakel Voronezh	18	(7)
2015	FSK Dolgoprudny	8	(1)
2015–2016	FC Ryazan	19	(3)
2016–2017	FC Smena Komsomolsk-na-Amure	14	(5)
2017–2018	FC Sakhalin Yuzhno-Sakhalinsk	4	(0)

International career
2003	Russia U-21	2	(0)
- * Club domestic league appearances and goals

Aleksandr Valeryevich Antipenko (Russian: Александр Валерьевич Антипенко; born 27 May 1982) is a former Russian footballer.

== Club career ==
He made his Russian Premier League debut for FC Khimki on 10 March 2007 in a game against PFC Krylia Sovetov Samara. He spent 4 seasons in the RPL with Khimki and FC Sibir Novosibirsk.
