= Aleksei Medvedev (footballer) =

Russian footballer

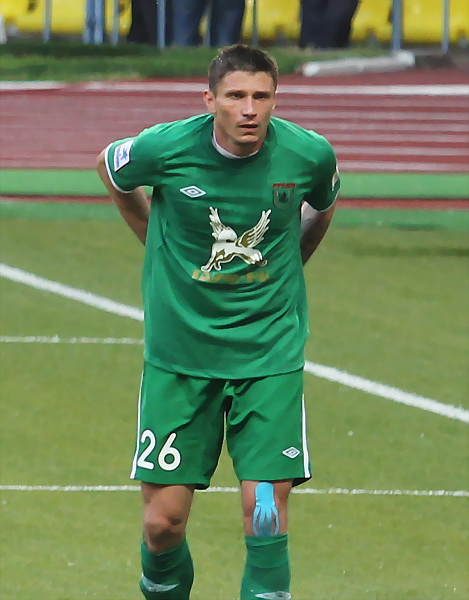

Personal information
- Full name: Aleksei Sergeyevich Medvedev
- Date of birth: 5 January 1977 (age 49)
- Place of birth: Pavlovsky Posad, Russia, Soviet Union
- Height: 1.83 m (6 ft 0 in)
- Position: Forward

Youth career
- CSKA Moscow

Senior career*
Years	Team	Apps	(Gls)
1995–1999	Spartak-Orekhovo	107	(38)
1999–2000	Saturn Ramenskoye	40	(9)
2000	Dynamo-2 Moscow	2	(1)
2000–2001	Dynamo Moscow	23	(4)
2002–2004	Saturn Ramenskoye	70	(21)
2005	→ Tom Tomsk (loan)	30	(5)
2006–2007	Krylia Sovetov Samara	53	(7)
2008–2010	Sibir Novosibirsk	83	(32)
2010–2011	Rubin Kazan	34	(10)
2012–2013	Sibir Novosibirsk	22	(6)
2013	→ Spartak Nalchik (loan)	33	(6)
2014	FC Khimki	10	(1)
2014–2015	Saturn Ramenskoye	29	(18)

International career
2004	Russia B	2	(0)

Managerial career
- 2016–2017: Arsenal-2 Tula (assistant)
- 2019: FShM Torpedo Moscow (assistant)
- 2020: Zorky Krasnogorsk
- 2020: Kolomna
- 2020: Peresvet Domodedovo
- 2020–2021: Krasny
- 2021–2022: Saturn Ramenskoye
- 2023–2024: Sibir Novosibirsk
- 2026: Saturn Ramenskoye
- * Club domestic league appearances and goals

Aleksei Sergeyevich Medvedev (Russian: Алексей Серге́евич Медведев; born 5 January 1977) is a Russian professional football coach and a former player.

== Career ==
Medvedev, an alumnus of CSKA Moscow youth school, started his professional career in 1995 playing for Orekhovo in the Russian Second Division. In 1998, he became the league top scorer with 24 goals.

Following this achievement, Medvedev signed for the Russian Premier League club Saturn Ramenskoye in 1999. In 2000, he moved to Dynamo Moscow for a reported fee of €200,000. He played in the UEFA Cup 2000–01 and UEFA Cup 2001–02 for Dynamo Moscow (5 games). In 2002, Saturn brought his back to Ramenskoye for a reported sum of €325,000.

In 2005, he was loaned to Tom Tomsk, and in 2006 he signed for Krylia Sovetov Samara.

Two years later, Medvedev moved to the Russian First Division club Sibir Novosibirsk. With Sibir Medvedev, as the team's captain, became the First Division top scorer, best striker and best player in 2009, and helped the club to be promoted to the Russian Premier League for the first time in its history. On 20 March 2010, he scored Sibir's first goal in the Premier League. On 21 April 2010, Medvedev's hat-trick led the team to the 2009–10 Russian Cup final, and to the European stage. On 29 July 2010, he scored the first Sibir's goal at the international level when Sibir defeated Apollon Limassol (1:0) in the UEFA Europa League qualification.

In August 2010, he moved to Rubin Kazan for a reported fee of €1 million.

== Honours ==
- Russian First Division best player: 2009.
- Russian First Division best striker: 2009.
- Russian First Division top scorer: 2009 (18 goals).
