= Maksim Astafyev =

Russian football player and coach

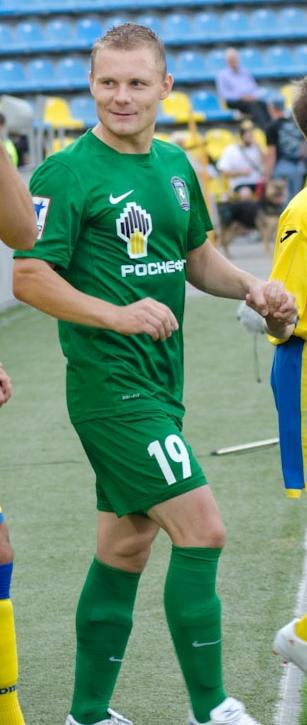
- Astafyev with FC Tom Tomsk in 2013

Personal information
- Full name: Maksim Yuryevich Astafyev
- Date of birth: 8 December 1982 (age 43)
- Place of birth: Kolpino, Soviet Union (now Russia)
- Height: 1.69 m (5 ft 7 in)
- Position: Midfielder

Team information
- Current team: Leningradets (assistant coach)

Youth career
- Izhorets Kolpino
- Kirovets-Nadezhda St. Petersburg

Senior career*
| Years | Team | Apps | (Gls) |
| 2000 | Zenit-d St. Petersburg | 29 | (4) |
| 2001–2004 | Zenit St. Petersburg | 25 | (5) |
| 2004–2007 | Luch-Energiya Vladivostok | 95 | (18) |
| 2008–2009 | Rostov | 55 | (3) |
| 2010–2013 | Sibir Novosibirsk | 85 | (22) |
| 2013 | → Ural Yekaterinburg (loan) | 3 | (0) |
| 2013–2014 | Tom Tomsk | 9 | (0) |
| 2014 | → Sibir Novosibirsk (loan) | 29 | (8) |
| 2015–2016 | Tosno | 42 | (6) |
| 2016–2018 | Mordovia Saransk | 41 | (8) |
| 2017 | → SKA-Khabarovsk (loan) | 13 | (1) |
| 2018–2020 | Leningradets | 35 | (7) |

International career
| 2001 | Russia U-19 | 7 | (2) |

Managerial career
- 2020–2024: Leningradets (assistant)
- 2024: Leningradets
- 2024–: Leningradets (assistant)
- * Club domestic league appearances and goals

Maksim Yuryevich Astafyev (Russian: Максим Юрьевич Астафьев; born 8 December 1982) is a Russian football coach and a former player who is the assistant coach of Leningradets.

== Career ==
He made his debut in the Russian Premier League in 2001 for Zenit St. Petersburg. In February 2010 Sibir Novosibirsk signed the versatile midfielder from FC Rostov on a two-year deal. Since December 2014, he played for Tosno in Russian National Football League.
