= Aleksei Vasilyev (footballer) =

Russian footballer

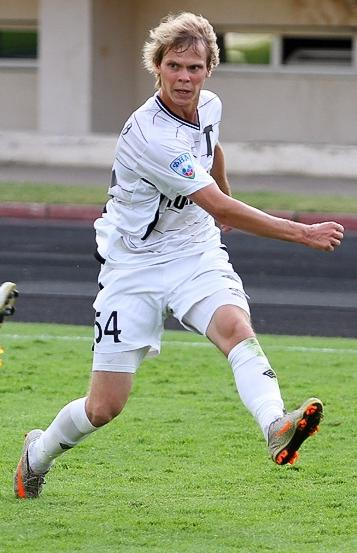

Personal information
- Full name: Aleksei Yuryevich Vasilyev
- Date of birth: 28 October 1987 (age 38)
- Height: 1.70 m (5 ft 7 in)
- Position: Midfielder

Senior career*
| Years | Team | Apps | (Gls) |
| 2004–2007 | PFC CSKA Moscow | 0 | (0) |
| 2008–2009 | FC Nosta Novotroitsk | 2 | (0) |
| 2008 | → FC Dynamo Barnaul (loan) | 16 | (0) |
| 2009 | → FC Sibir Novosibirsk (loan) | 26 | (2) |
| 2010 | FC Sibir Novosibirsk | 9 | (0) |
| 2011 | → FC Torpedo Moscow (loan) | 27 | (5) |
| 2012 | FC SKA-Energiya Khabarovsk | 10 | (2) |
| 2012 | FC Ufa | 12 | (0) |
| 2013 | FC Dolgoprudny | 6 | (2) |
| 2013–2014 | FC Sokol Saratov | 38 | (3) |
| 2015–2016 | FSK Dolgoprudny | 38 | (8) |
- * Club domestic league appearances and goals

Aleksei Yuryevich Vasilyev (Russian: Алексей Юрьевич Васильев; born 28 October 1987) is a former Russian professional footballer.

== Club career ==
He made his professional debut in the Russian First Division in 2008 for FC Nosta Novotroitsk. He played two games for PFC CSKA Moscow main squad in the Russian Cup.

== Honours ==
- Russian Cup winner: 2006.
