= Aleksandr Makarenko =

Russian footballer

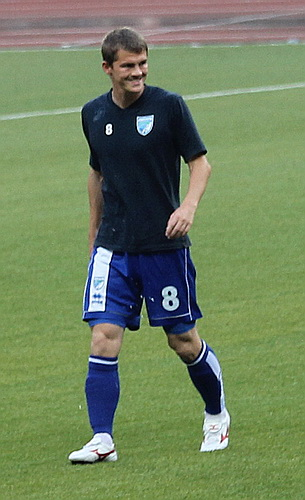

Personal information
- Full name: Aleksandr Aleksandrovich Makarenko
- Date of birth: 4 February 1986 (age 40)
- Place of birth: Novosibirsk, Russian SFSR
- Height: 1.70 m (5 ft 7 in)
- Position: Midfielder

Youth career
- FC Chkalovets-Olimpik Novosibirsk

Senior career*
Years	Team	Apps	(Gls)
2003	FC Chkalovets-Olimpik Novosibirsk	2	(0)
2005–2007	FC Saturn Ramenskoye	6	(0)
2006	→ FC Sibir Novosibirsk (loan)	38	(0)
2007–2013	FC Sibir Novosibirsk	137	(8)
2008	→ FC SKA-Energiya Khabarovsk (loan)	17	(0)
2010	→ FC Zhemchuzhina-Sochi (loan)	14	(2)
2013–2015	FC Arsenal Tula	32	(0)
2015	→ FC Baltika Kaliningrad (loan)	8	(0)
2015–2019	FC Sibir Novosibirsk	124	(3)
2019	FC Luch Vladivostok	16	(0)
2021–2022	FC Novosibirsk	16	(0)
- * Club domestic league appearances and goals

Aleksandr Aleksandrovich Makarenko (Russian: Александр Александрович Макаренко; born 4 February 1986) is a Russian former professional footballer.

== Club career ==
He made his debut in the Russian Premier League for FC Saturn Ramenskoye on 22 May 2005 in a game against PFC Krylia Sovetov Samara.

In 2010, he participated in the Europa League campaign of FC Sibir Novosibirsk.
