= Aleksandr Degtyaryov =

Russian professional footballer

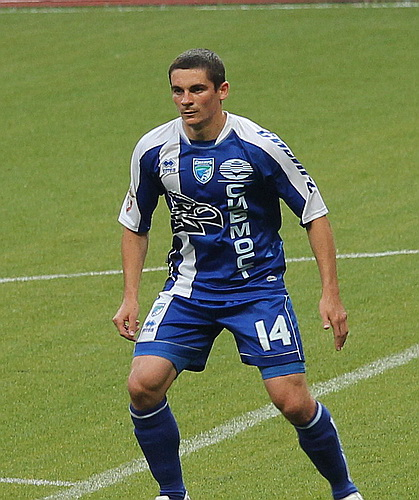

Personal information
- Full name: Aleksandr Viktorovich Degtyaryov
- Date of birth: 7 September 1983 (age 43)
- Place of birth: Novoalexandrovsk, Russian SFSR
- Height: 1.71 m (5 ft 7 in)
- Position: Midfielder

Senior career*
Years	Team	Apps	(Gls)
2006	FC Elista	17	(4)
2006–2007	FC Alania Vladikavkaz	51	(16)
2008–2012	FC Sibir Novosibirsk	103	(10)
2012–2013	FC Volgar Astrakhan	23	(2)
2013–2016	FC Sokol Saratov	93	(37)
2016–2017	FC Mordovia Saransk	29	(4)
2017–2018	FC Sibir Novosibirsk	32	(3)
- * Club domestic league appearances and goals

Aleksandr Viktorovich Degtyaryov (Russian: Александр Викторович Дегтярёв; born 7 September 1983) is a Russian former professional footballer. He also holds Belarusian citizenship.

== Club career ==
He made his professional debut in the Russian Second Division in 2006 for FC Elista.
