= Tomáš Vychodil =

Czech-Russian footballer and coach (born 1975)

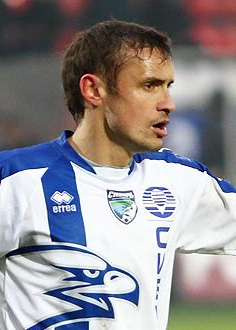
- Vychodil playing for Sibir Novosibirsk

Personal information
- Date of birth: 7 October 1975 (age 51)
- Place of birth: Olomouc, Czechoslovakia
- Height: 1.85 m (6 ft 1 in)
- Position: Centre-back

Team information
- Current team: Novosibirsk (head of academy)

Youth career
- 1985–1989: Sokol Újezd
- 1989–1990: TJ US Uničov
- 1989–1995: Sigma Olomouc

Senior career*
Years	Team	Apps	(Gls)
1995–1996	UNEX Uničov		
1996–2002	Kaučuk Opava	121	(7)
2002	Kristall Smolensk	37	(3)
2003	Khimki	20	(0)
2003–2005	Tom Tomsk	31	(1)
2005–2012	Sibir Novosibirsk	173	(2)
2012–2013	Metallurg-Kuzbass Novokuznetsk	14	(1)
2013–2017	Sibir Novosibirsk	120	(9)

Managerial career
- 2017–2019: Novosibirsk (youth coach)
- 2019: Sibir-2 Novosibirsk (assistant)
- 2019–2020: Novosibirsk (youth coach)
- 2020–2021: Novosibirsk (assistant)
- 2022–: Novosibirsk (youth coach)
- 2022–: Novosibirsk (head of academy)
- * Club domestic league appearances and goals

Tomáš Vychodil (born 7 October 1975) is a Czech-Russian football coach and former player.

== Career ==
After playing in the Czech Republic and declining an offer from German club Darmstadt, Vychodil left for Russia to further his career with Kristall Smolensk, signing after a trial through former UNEX Uničov coach Alexandr Bokij.
