= Steeve Joseph-Reinette =

French footballer (born 1983)

Personal information
- Full name: Steeve Joseph-Reinette
- Date of birth: 2 December 1983 (age 42)
- Place of birth: Paris, France
- Height: 1.80 m (5 ft 11 in)
- Position: Defender

Youth career
- 1999–2002: Guingamp

Senior career*
Years	Team	Apps	(Gls)
2002–2006	Guingamp	27	(0)
2006–2008	Cisco Roma	38	(0)
2008–2009	CSM Ploiești	1	(0)
2009–2010	Slavia Sofia	18	(0)
2010	→ Sibir (loan)	13	(1)
2011–2013	Krylia Sovetov	28	(1)
- * Club domestic league appearances and goals

Steeve Joseph-Reinette (born 2 December 1983) is a retired French football defender.

== Club career ==
Born in Paris, France, Steeve Joseph-Reinette signed his first professional footballing contract with French Ligue 2 club Guingamp, the club that has boasted stars such as Vincent Candela, Florent Malouda and Didier Drogba, where he went on to make just 27 appearances in five seasons, he then moved on to Italian Serie C2 club Cisco Roma in 2007–2008 season where he showed much improvement by appearing in 38 matches in 2 season, he then moved to a Romanian division 2 club CSM Ploiești.

On 2 August 2009, Reinette signed for two years with Bulgarian Slavia Sofia.

After a brief loan spell with Sibir Novosibirsk, in January 2011, Reinette put pen to paper to a 2.5-year contract with another Russian side - Krylia Sovetov Samara.
