= Nikola Valentić =

Serbian footballer

Nikola Valentić Никола Валентић
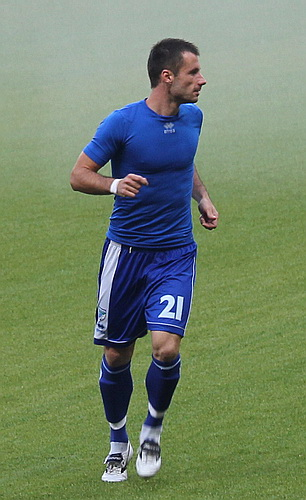

Personal information
- Date of birth: 6 September 1983 (age 43)
- Place of birth: Čapljina, SR Bosnia and Herzegovina, SFR Yugoslavia
- Height: 1.83 m (6 ft 0 in)
- Position: Right-back

Youth career
- OFK Beograd

Senior career*
| Years | Team | Apps | (Gls) |
| 2000–2002 | OFK Beograd | 0 | (0) |
| 2002–2005 | Voždovac | 64 | (7) |
| 2005 | Srem | 18 | (1) |
| 2006 | Bnei Sakhnin | 5 | (0) |
| 2006–2008 | Anzhi Makhachkala | 78 | (1) |
| 2009 | Alania Vladikavkaz | 28 | (1) |
| 2010–2012 | Sibir Novosibirsk | 49 | (1) |
| 2012 | Jagodina | 9 | (0) |
| 2013–2014 | Gabala | 25 | (0) |
| 2015 | Radnički Niš | 6 | (0) |
| 2015 | Inđija | 10 | (0) |
| 2016 | Bežanija | 11 | (0) |
| 2016 | Kokand 1912 | 13 | (0) |
| 2018–2019 | Sinđelić Beograd | 16 | (0) |
- * Club domestic league appearances and goals

Nikola Valentić (Serbian Cyrillic: Никола Валентић; born 6 September 1983) is a Serbian former footballer.

== Career ==
Born in Čapljina, SR Bosnia and Herzegovina, Valentić started his career at OFK Beograd as youth team member before moving to FK Voždovac in 2002. Valentić the signed for Bnei Sakhnin in Israel in 2006 before quickly moving on to Anzhi Makhachkala in Russia. Valentić signed for Alania Vladikavkaz in 2009, getting voted the club's best player, before joining Sibir Novosibirsk in 2010. Valentić returned to Serbia in the summer of 2012, joining FK Jagodina before signing with Azerbaijan Premier League team Gabala in January 2013. After Valentić's Gabala contract expired, he returned to Jagodina.

== Career statistics ==
As of match played 22 November 2016

Appearances and goals by club, season and competition
| Club | Season | League | | | National Cup | | Continental | | Other | | Total | |
| Club | Season | Division | Apps | Goals | Apps | Goals | Apps | Goals | Apps | Goals | Apps | Goals |
|---|---|---|---|---|---|---|---|---|---|---|---|---|
| Anzhi Makhachkala | 2006 | Russian First Division | 13 | 1 | | | - | | - | | 13 | 1 |
| Anzhi Makhachkala | 2007 | Russian First Division | 32 | 1 | | | - | | - | | 32 | 1 |
| Anzhi Makhachkala | 2008 | Russian First Division | 33 | 0 | | | - | | - | | 33 | 0 |
| Anzhi Makhachkala | Total | | 78 | 2 | | | - | - | - | - | 78 | 2 |
| Alania Vladikavkaz | 2009 | Russian First Division | 28 | 1 | 1 | 0 | – | | – | | 29 | 1 |
| Sibir Novosibirsk | 2010 | Russian Premier League | 12 | 0 | 1 | 0 | 2 | 0 | - | | 15 | 0 |
| Sibir Novosibirsk | 2011–12 | Russian National Football League | 37 | 1 | 1 | 0 | - | | - | | 38 | 1 |
| Sibir Novosibirsk | Total | | 49 | 1 | 2 | 0 | 2 | 0 | - | - | 53 | 0 |
| Jagodina | 2012–13 | Serbian SuperLiga | 9 | 0 | 1 | 0 | – | | – | | 10 | 0 |
| Gabala | 2012–13 | Azerbaijan Premier League | 10 | 0 | 0 | 0 | - | | - | | 10 | 0 |
| Gabala | 2013–14 | Azerbaijan Premier League | 15 | 0 | 2 | 0 | - | | - | | 17 | 0 |
| Gabala | Total | | 25 | 0 | 2 | 0 | - | - | - | - | 27 | 0 |
| Radnički Niš | 2014–15 | Serbian SuperLiga | 6 | 0 | 0 | 0 | – | | – | | 6 | 0 |
| Inđija | 2015–16 | Serbian First League | 10 | 0 | 2 | 0 | – | | – | | 12 | 0 |
| Bežanija | 2015–16 | Serbian First League | 11 | 0 | 0 | 0 | – | | – | | 11 | 0 |
| Kokand 1912 | 2016 | Uzbek League | 13 | 0 | 0 | 0 | – | | – | | 13 | 0 |
| Career total | | | 229 | 4 | 8 | 0 | 2 | 0 | - | - | 239 | 4 |
