= Aleksei Solosin =

Russian footballer

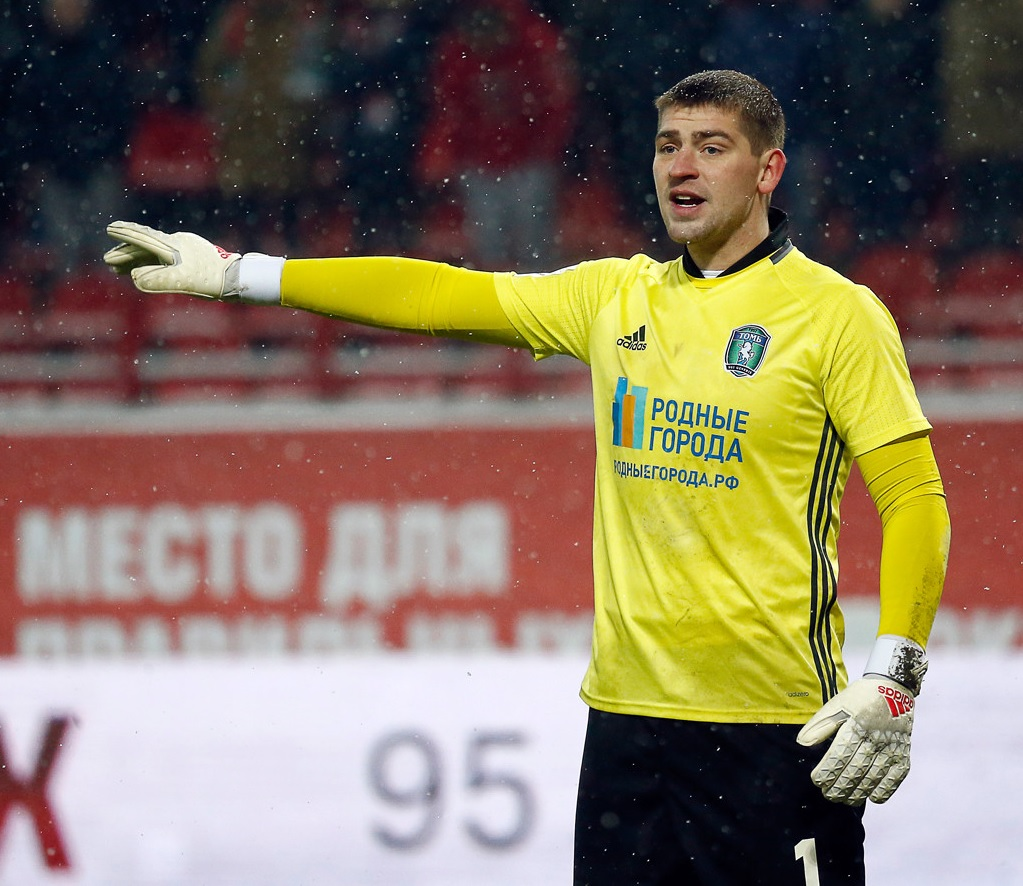
- Solosin with Tom Tomsk in 2016

Personal information
- Full name: Aleksei Aleksandrovich Solosin
- Date of birth: 11 August 1987 (age 39)
- Place of birth: Balashikha, Russian SFSR
- Height: 1.89 m (6 ft 2 1/2 in)
- Position: Goalkeeper

Youth career
- Spartak Moscow

Senior career*
Years	Team	Apps	(Gls)
2003–2005	Spartak Moscow	0	(0)
2005	→ Spartak Chelyabinsk (loan)	26	(0)
2006	→ Fakel Voronezh (loan)	13	(0)
2007	Saturn Ramenskoye	0	(0)
2008	Chernomorets Novorossiysk	31	(0)
2009	Tom Tomsk	0	(0)
2009	→ Ural (loan)	33	(0)
2010	Sibir Novosibirsk	12	(0)
2011	Dynamo Barnaul	7	(0)
2012–2013	SKA-Energiya	39	(0)
2013	Ural	9	(0)
2014	Khimki	0	(0)
2014–2017	Tom Tomsk	56	(0)
2017	Anzhi Makhachkala	7	(0)
2018	Kolkheti Poti	2	(0)
2019	FC Noah	3	(0)
2020	Masis FC	0	(0)

International career
2005	Russia U-18	5	(0)
- * Club domestic league appearances and goals

Aleksei Aleksandrovich Solosin (Russian: Алексей Александрович Солосин; born 11 August 1987) is a Russian former professional football goalkeeper.

== Club career ==
He made his professional debut in the Russian First Division in 2005 for FC Spartak Chelyabinsk.

On 11 June 2017, he signed a two-year contract with FC Anzhi Makhachkala. On 14 December 2017, his Anzhi contract was dissolved by mutual consent.

=== Career statistics ===
As of 9 December 2017

Club	Season	League			Cup		Continental		Other		Total	
Club	Season	Division	Apps	Goals	Apps	Goals	Apps	Goals	Apps	Goals	Apps	Goals
FC Spartak Moscow	2002	Premier Liga	0	0	0	0	0	0	–		0	0
FC Spartak Moscow	2003	Premier Liga	0	0	0	0	0	0	–		0	0
FC Spartak Moscow	2004	Premier Liga	0	0	0	0	0	0	–		0	0
FC Spartak Moscow	2005	Premier Liga	0	0	0	0	–		–		0	0
FC Spartak Moscow	Total		0	0	0	0	0	0	0	0	0	0
FC Spartak Chelyabinsk	2005	First Division	25	–30	1	–1	–		–		26	–31
FC Fakel Voronezh	2006	First Division	13	–19	2	–3	–		–		15	–22
FC Saturn Ramenskoye	2007	Premier Liga	0	0	0	0	–		–		0	0
FC Chernomorets Novorossiysk	2008	First Division	31	–27	1	–1	–		–		32	–28
FC Ural Yekaterinburg	2009	First Division	33	–29	3	–3	–		–		36	–32
FC Sibir Novosibirsk	2010	Premier Liga	12	–22	3	–3	3	–7	–		18	–32
FC Dynamo Barnaul	2011–12	Second Division	7	–9	0	0	–		–		7	–9
FC SKA-Energia Khabarovsk	2011–12	FNL	10	–9	0	0	–		–		10	–9
FC SKA-Energia Khabarovsk	2012–13	FNL	27	–19	0	0	–		2 (Note: Two appearances in promotion play-offs)	–3	29	–22
FC SKA-Energia Khabarovsk	Total		37	–28	0	0	0	0	2	–3	39	–31
FC Ural Yekaterinburg	2013–14	Premier Liga	9	–17	1	-0	–		–		10	–17
FC Ural Yekaterinburg	Total (2 spells)		42	–46	4	–3	0	0	0	0	46	–49
FC Khimki	2013–14	PFL	0	0	0	0	–		–		0	0
FC Tom Tomsk	2014–15	FNL	31	–31	0	0	–		2 (Note: Two appearances in promotion play-offs)	–1	33	–32
FC Tom Tomsk	2015–16	FNL	9	–9	1	–3	–		2 (Note: Two appearances in promotion play-offs)	–1	12	–13
FC Tom Tomsk	2016–17	Premier Liga	12	–23	0	0	–		–		12	–23
FC Tom Tomsk	Total		52	–63	1	–3	0	0	4	–2	57	–68
FC Anzhi Makhachkala	2017–18	Premier Liga	7	–16	0	0	–		–		7	–16
Career total			226	–260	12	–14	3	–7	6	–5	247	–286
