= Yevgeni Zinovyev =

Russian footballer and official

Personal information
- Full name: Yevgeni Vladimirovich Zinovyev
- Date of birth: 15 June 1981 (age 45)
- Place of birth: Novosibirsk, Russian SFSR
- Height: 1.83 m (6 ft 0 in)
- Position: Midfielder

Senior career*
Years	Team	Apps	(Gls)
1997	Chkalovets Novosibirsk	4	(0)
1998–2000	Lokomotiv-2 Moscow	58	(7)
2001–2006	Lokomotiv Moscow	0	(0)
2003	→ Volgar-Gazprom Astrakhan (loan)	28	(0)
2004	→ Gomel (loan)	12	(4)
2004	→ Baltika Kaliningrad (loan)	18	(2)
2006	→ Sibir Novosibirsk (loan)	35	(6)
2006–2016	Sibir Novosibirsk	224	(26)

Managerial career
- 2016–2018: Sibir Novosibirsk (administration)
- * Club domestic league appearances and goals

Yevgeni Vladimirovich Zinovyev (Russian: Евгений Владимирович Зиновьев; born 15 June 1981) is a Russian professional football official and a former player.

== Club career ==
He made his professional debut in the Russian Second Division in 1997 for FC Chkalovets Novosibirsk. He played one game for the main FC Lokomotiv Moscow squad in the Russian Cup.
