= Nikolay Lipatkin =

Russian footballer

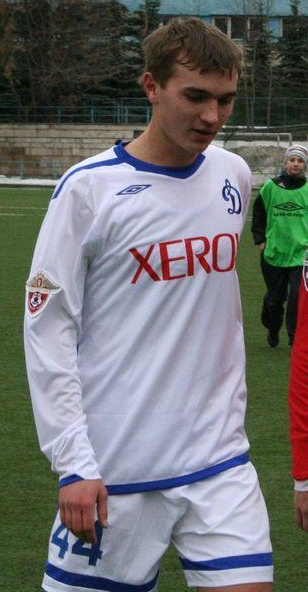
- Nikolai Lipatkin in 2007

Personal information
- Full name: Nikolay Vladimirovich Lipatkin
- Date of birth: 23 May 1986 (age 40)
- Place of birth: Moscow, Russian SFSR
- Height: 1.86 m (6 ft 1 in)
- Position: Midfielder

Youth career
- 2004–2007: Dynamo Moscow

Senior career*
Years	Team	Apps	(Gls)
2005–2007	Dynamo Moscow	0	(0)
2008–2009	MVD Rossii Moscow	45	(5)
2009–2010	Sibir Novosibirsk	15	(0)
2011–2012	Petrotrest St. Petersburg	37	(2)
2012	Gomel	7	(0)
2013	Kolomna	13	(2)
2014–2015	Khimki	40	(8)
2015–2017	Domodedovo Moscow	51	(6)
- * Club domestic league appearances and goals

Nikolay Vladimirovich Lipatkin (Russian: Никола́й Влади́мирович Липа́ткин; born 23 May 1986) is a Russian former professional association football player.

== Club career ==
He made his Russian Football National League debut for FC MVD Rossii Moscow on 8 April 2009 in a game against FC Metallurg Lipetsk.
