= Aleksandr Shumov =

Russian footballer

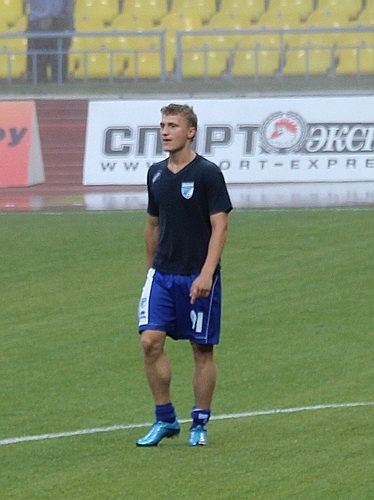

Personal information
- Full name: Aleksandr Vitalyevich Shumov
- Date of birth: 8 March 1991 (age 35)
- Height: 1.75 m (5 ft 9 in)
- Position: Midfielder

Senior career*
Years	Team	Apps	(Gls)
2008	FC Sibir-2 Novosibirsk	4	(0)
2009	FC Sibir-LFK Novosibirsk		
2010	FC Sibir Novosibirsk	1	(0)
2011–2013	FC Sibir-2 Novosibirsk	56	(9)
- * Club domestic league appearances and goals

Aleksandr Vitalyevich Shumov (Russian: Александр Витальевич Шумов; born 8 March 1991) is a Russian former professional football player.

== Club career ==
He made his Russian Premier League debut on 17 July 2010 for FC Sibir Novosibirsk in a game against FC Zenit Saint Petersburg.
