= Ivan Nagibin =

Russian footballer

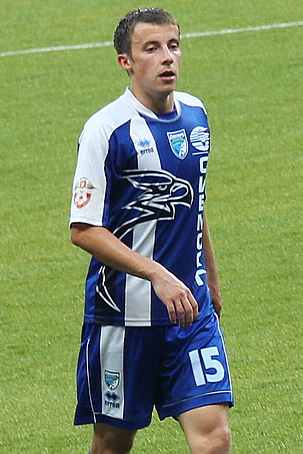

Personal information
- Full name: Ivan Aleksandrovich Nagibin
- Date of birth: 21 March 1986 (age 40)
- Place of birth: Chita, Russian SFSR
- Height: 1.76 m (5 ft 9 in)
- Position: Midfielder

Senior career*
Years	Team	Apps	(Gls)
2005–2009	FC Chita	161	(22)
2010–2012	FC Sibir Novosibirsk	47	(6)
2012–2013	FC Tom Tomsk	27	(3)
2013–2014	FC Ufa	29	(2)
2014–2016	FC Sibir Novosibirsk	56	(4)
2016–2017	FC Fakel Voronezh	12	(0)
2017–2018	FC Chita	18	(3)
- * Club domestic league appearances and goals

Ivan Aleksandrovich Nagibin (Russian: Иван Александрович Нагибин; born 21 March 1986) is a Russian former professional football player.
