= Denis Bukhryakov =

Russian professional footballer

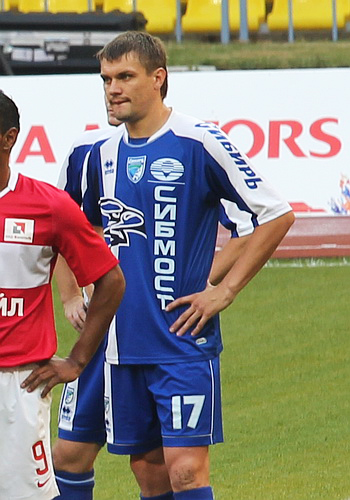

Personal information
- Full name: Denis Ivanovich Bukhryakov
- Date of birth: 28 April 1981 (age 45)
- Place of birth: Blagoveshchensk, Russian SFSR
- Height: 1.87 m (6 ft 1 1/2 in)
- Position: Defender

Senior career*
| Years | Team | Apps | (Gls) |
| 1997–1999 | FC Gornyak Raychikhinsk (D4/D5) | | |
| 1999–2003 | FC Amur Blagoveshchensk | 66 | (4) |
| 2004–2012 | FC Sibir Novosibirsk | 186 | (4) |
| 2012–2013 | FC Metallurg-Kuzbass Novokuznetsk | 12 | (0) |
| 2013–2015 | FC Sibir Novosibirsk | 12 | (0) |
- * Club domestic league appearances and goals

Denis Ivanovich Bukhryakov (Russian: Денис Иванович Бухряков; born 28 April 1981) is a former Russian professional footballer.

== Club career ==
He made his professional debut in the Russian Second Division in 1999 for FC Amur-Energiya Blagoveshchensk.

He is the only player in the history of Sibir Novosibirsk who helped the team to be promoted from the Russian Second Division to the First Division in 2004, and to the Russian Premier League in 2009.
