= Dmitry Molosh =

Belarusian footballer (born 1981)

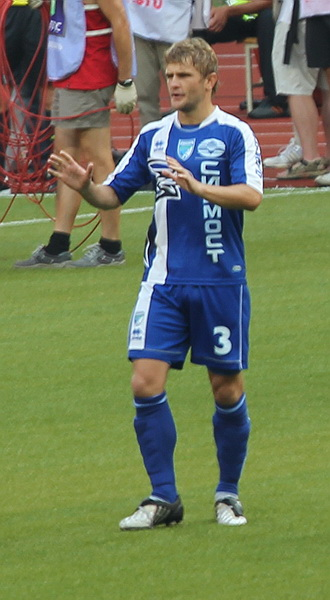

Personal information
- Date of birth: 10 December 1981 (age 44)
- Place of birth: Minsk, Soviet Union
- Height: 1.72 m (5 ft 7 1/2 in)
- Position: Defender

Youth career
- RShVSM-Olympia Minsk

Senior career*
Years	Team	Apps	(Gls)
1999	Molodechno	8	(0)
2000	RShVSM-Olympia Minsk	22	(2)
2001–2006	BATE Borisov	118	(10)
2007–2008	Nosta Novotroitsk	52	(3)
2009–2010	Sibir Novosibirsk	50	(11)
2011–2012	Krylia Sovetov Samara	15	(0)
2012–2014	Dinamo Minsk	18	(0)

International career
2001–2004	Belarus U21	16	(0)
2006–2011	Belarus	14	(0)

Managerial career
- 2016–2017: Smolevichi-STI
- 2018–2019: BATE Borisov (assistant)
- 2020–2021: Liepāja
- 2021–2025: Torpedo-BelAZ Zhodino
- 2026: Krylia Sovetov Samara (assistant)
- * Club domestic league appearances and goals

Dmitry Molosh (or Dzmitry Molash, Belarusian: Дзмітры Молаш; Russian: Дмитрий Васильевич Молош; born 10 December 1981) is a Belarusian professional football manager and former player.

== Playing career ==
Molosh previously played for FC Nosta Novotroitsk in the Russian First Division.

He is known for his long-range powerful shot which helped him to score several long-distance goals.

== Honours ==
BATE Borisov

- Belarusian Premier League: 2002, 2006
- Belarusian Cup: 2005–06
