= Igor Shevchenko =

Russian footballer (born 1985)

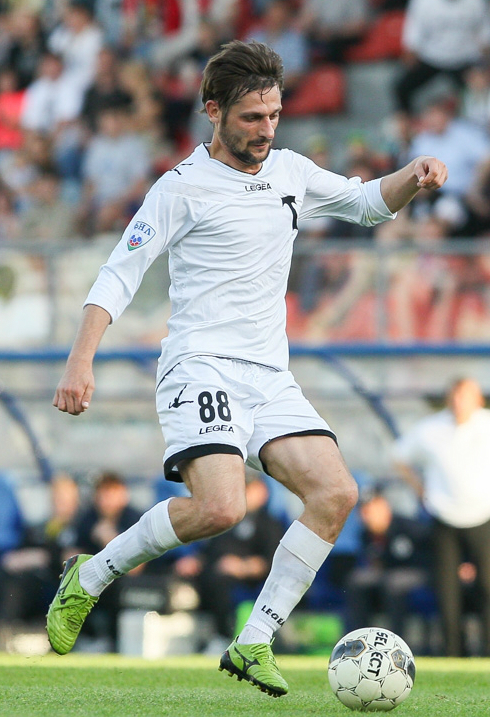
- Shevchenko with Torpedo in 2014

Personal information
- Full name: Igor Vadimovich Shevchenko
- Date of birth: 2 February 1985 (age 41)
- Place of birth: Kuybyshev, Soviet Union
- Height: 1.80 m (5 ft 11 in)
- Positions: Forward; midfielder

Senior career*
Years	Team	Apps	(Gls)
2002–2007	FC Krylia Sovetov Samara	20	(1)
2004	→ FC Fakel Voronezh (loan)	13	(5)
2006	→ FC Anzhi Makhachkala (loan)	13	(4)
2008	FC Luch-Energiya Vladivostok	25	(5)
2009–2010	FC Terek Grozny	8	(0)
2009–2010	→ FC Kuban Krasnodar (loan)	10	(1)
2010–2013	FC Sibir Novosibirsk	51	(8)
2011	→ FC Zhemchuzhina-Sochi (loan)	13	(1)
2011–2013	→ FC Yenisey Krasnoyarsk (loan)	13	(1)
2013–2014	FC Torpedo Moscow	43	(8)
2015	FC Ufa	11	(1)
2016–2018	FC Arsenal Tula	50	(6)
2018–2019	FC Syzran-2003	20	(5)

International career
2004	Russia U-21	3	(0)
- * Club domestic league appearances and goals

Igor Vadimovich Shevchenko (Russian: Игорь Вадимович Шевченко; born 2 February 1985) is a Russian former footballer. He played as a left midfielder.

== Career statistics ==
=== Club ===
As of 13 May 2018

Club	Season	League			Cup		Continental		Other		Total	
Club	Season	Division	Apps	Goals	Apps	Goals	Apps	Goals	Apps	Goals	Apps	Goals
Krylia Sovetov Samara	2001	Russian Premier League	0	0	0	0	–		–		0	0
Krylia Sovetov Samara	2002	Russian Premier League	1	0	0	0	–		–		1	0
Krylia Sovetov Samara	2003	Russian Premier League	0	0	0	0	–		–		0	0
Krylia Sovetov Samara	2004	Russian Premier League	0	0	0	0	–		–		0	0
Fakel Voronezh	2004	PFL	13	5	–		–		–		13	5
Krylia Sovetov Samara	2005	Russian Premier League	0	0	0	0	0	0	–		0	0
Krylia Sovetov Samara	2006	Russian Premier League	5	0	2	0	–		–		7	0
Anzhi Makhachkala	2006	FNL	13	4	–		–		–		13	4
Krylia Sovetov Samara	2007	Russian Premier League	14	1	5	0	–		–		19	1
Krylia Sovetov Samara	Total (3 spells)		20	1	7	0	0	0	0	0	27	1
Luch-Energiya Vladivostok	2008	Russian Premier League	25	5	0	0	–		–		25	5
Terek Grozny	2009	Russian Premier League	8	0	1	0	–		–		9	0
Kuban Krasnodar	2009	Russian Premier League	10	1	–		–		–		10	1
Sibir Novosibirsk	2010	Russian Premier League	19	4	2	2	3	1	–		24	7
Zhemchuzhina Sochi	2011–12	FNL	13	1	1	0	–		–		14	1
Yenisey Krasnoyarsk	2011–12	FNL	13	1	–		–		–		13	1
Sibir Novosibirsk	2012–13	FNL	32	4	1	0	–		–		33	4
Sibir Novosibirsk	Total (2 spells)		51	8	3	2	3	1	0	0	57	11
Torpedo Moscow	2013–14	FNL	29	8	0	0	–		2 (Note: Two appearances in promotion play-offs)	0	31	8
Torpedo Moscow	2014–15	Russian Premier League	14	0	1	0	–		–		15	0
Torpedo Moscow	Total		43	8	1	0	0	0	2	0	46	8
Ufa	2014–15	Russian Premier League	11	1	–		–		–		11	1
Arsenal Tula	2015–16	FNL	14	4	0	0	–		–		14	4
Arsenal Tula	2016–17	Russian Premier League	18	1	0	0	–		2 (Note: Two appearances in relegation play-offs)	1	20	2
Arsenal Tula	2017–18	Russian Premier League	18	1	1	0	–		–		19	1
Arsenal Tula	Total		50	6	1	0	0	0	2	1	53	7
Career total			270	41	14	2	3	1	4	1	291	45
