= Spartak Stadium (Novosibirsk) =

Football stadium in Novosibirsk, Russia

Coordinates: 55°2′17.53″N 82°55′30.07″E

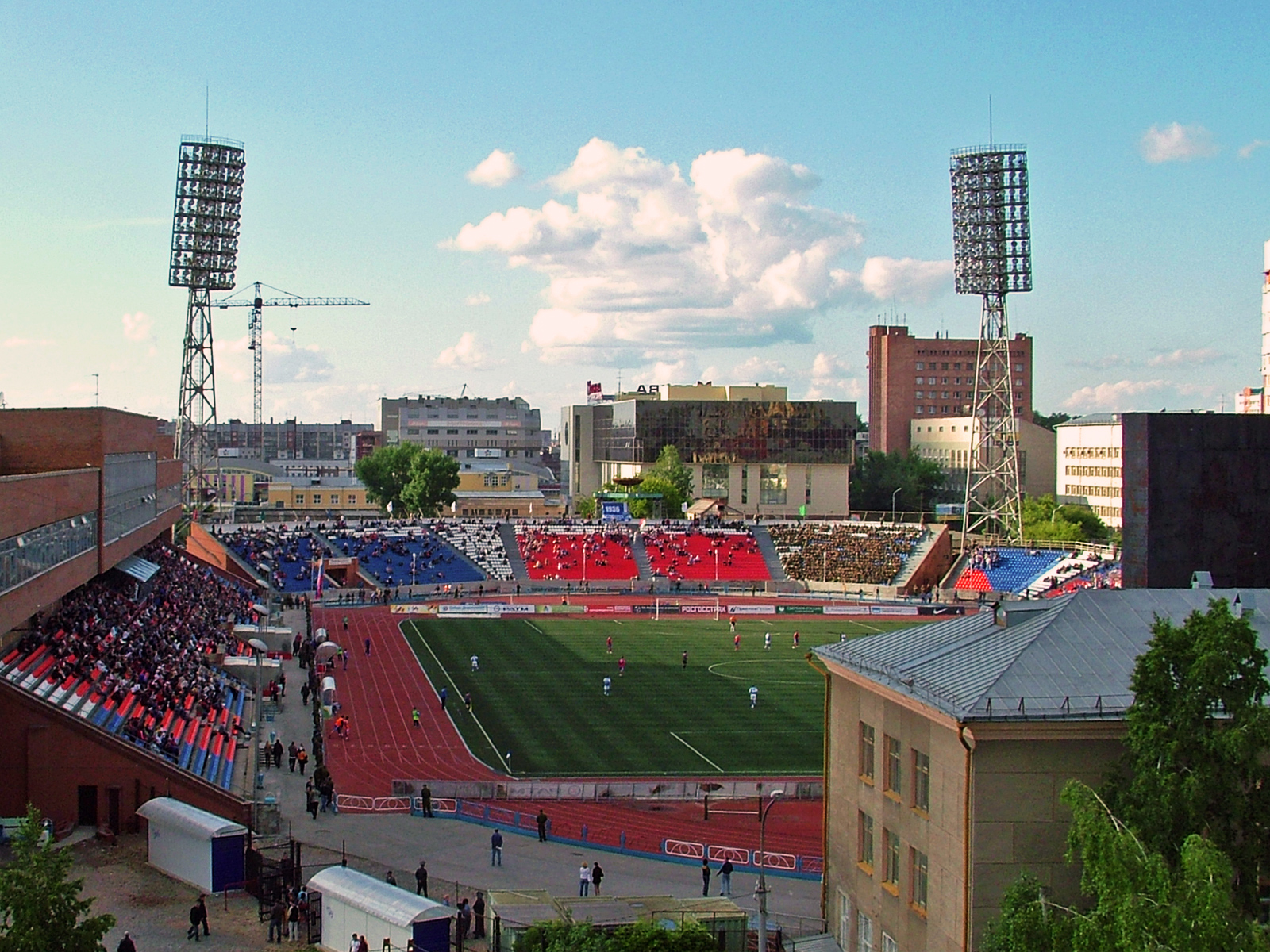

Spartak Stadium is a multi-purpose stadium in Novosibirsk, Russia. It is currently used mostly for football matches and is the home ground of FC Novosibirsk. The stadium holds 12,500 people.

It is the most easterly venue to have hosted a match in UEFA club competition.
