= FC Sibir-2 Novosibirsk =

Russian football club

Sibir-2
- Full name: Football Club; Sibir-2 Novosibirsk
- Founded: 2003
- Dissolved: 2019
- Ground: Spartak Stadium, Novosibirsk
- Capacity: 12,500
- 2018–19: PFL, Zone East, 6th
Home colours	Away colours

FC Sibir-2 Novosibirsk (Russian: «Сибирь‑2» (Новосибирск)) was a Russian football club, based in Novosibirsk. The club plays at the Spartak Stadium. It competed professionally in the Russian Second Division (East Zone) for a single season in 2008, taking 4th place. It previously played in the Amateur Football League. It is a farm club of FC Sibir Novosibirsk. After 2008 season, it was dissolved and did not compete in 2009 or 2010. It was re-established in 2011 and entered the Russian Second Division once again. The club was dissolved again in the summer of 2016. Before the 2018–19 season, it was revived once again and reentered the third-tier Russian Professional Football League. At the end of the 2018–19 season, the parent club Sibir was relegated to PFL itself, therefore Sibir-2 was not eligible to participate in the 2019–20 season of the competition.

== Team name history ==
- 2003–2005: FC Chkalovets-1936-2 Novosibirsk
- 2006–2008, 2011–2016: FC Sibir-2 Novosibirsk
