= 2013–14 FC Tom Tomsk season =

Tom Tomsk
2013–14 season
- Chairman: Artyom Fomenko
- Manager: Anatoli Davydov until 15 September 2013; Vasili Baskakov from 15 September 2013
- Stadium: Trud Stadium
- Russian Premier League: 13th Relegated
- Russian Cup: Quarter-finals vs Luch-Energiya Vladivostok.
- Top goalscorer: League: Kirill Panchenko (7); All: Kirill Panchenko (8)
- Highest home attendance: 10,000 vs Spartak Moscow; 3 May 2014
- Lowest home attendance: 700 vs Luch-Energiya Vladivostok; 26 March 2014
- Average home league attendance: 5,111
Home colours	Away colours

The 2013–14 FC Tom Tomsk season was the club's 1st season back in the Russian Premier League, the highest tier of football in Russia, following their relegation at the end of the 2011–12 season. They finished the season in 13th place, qualifying for the Relegation play-offs where they lost over two legs to FC Ufa and were relegated from the Premier League. Tom Tomsk also took part in the 2013–14 Russian Cup, where they reached the Quarter-finals, losing to Luch-Energiya Vladivostok.

== Squad ==
=== First-team squad ===
Note: Flags indicate national team as defined under FIFA eligibility rules; some limited exceptions apply. Players may hold more than one non-FIFA nationality.

No.	Pos.	Nation	Player
1	GK	MNE	Mladen Božović
3	DF	RUS	Aleksei Aravin
4	MF	RUS	Yevgeni Bashkirov
6	MF	ROU	Gabriel Mureșan
7	MF	RUS	Valeri Sorokin
8	FW	RUS	Nikita Bazhenov
9	FW	RUS	Igor Portnyagin (on loan from Rubin Kazan)
10	FW	RUS	Pavel Golyshev (vice-captain)
11	MF	RUS	Pavel Ignatovich (on loan from Dynamo Moscow)
13	MF	BLR	Pavel Nyakhaychyk
14	MF	RUS	Aleksandr Cherevko
15	DF	RUS	Vladimir Kisenkov
17	FW	USA	Yevgeni Starikov (on loan from Zenit Saint Petersburg)
18	GK	CZE	Petr Vašek

No.	Pos.	Nation	Player
20	DF	BUL	Zhivko Milanov
21	DF	BLR	Maksim Bardachow
25	GK	MDA	Ilie Cebanu (on loan from Rubin Kazan)
29	FW	CZE	Jan Holenda (on loan from Rostov)
30	DF	SVK	Kornel Saláta (on loan from Rostov)
33	DF	RUS	Vladimir Rykov (on loan from Dynamo Moscow)
34	MF	RUS	Renat Sabitov
37	DF	RUS	Mikhail Komkov (on loan from Kuban Krasnodar)
52	DF	CZE	Martin Jiránek (captain)
63	DF	RUS	Denis Terentyev (on loan from Zenit Saint Petersburg)
77	MF	HUN	Ádám Pintér
88	FW	RUS	Kirill Panchenko
92	DF	RUS	Dmitri Nikitinsky

==== Out on loan ====
Note: Flags indicate national team as defined under FIFA eligibility rules; some limited exceptions apply. Players may hold more than one non-FIFA nationality.

No. / Pos. / Nation / Player; 19 / MF / RUS / Maksim Astafyev (at Sibir Novosibirsk)	No. / Pos. / Nation / Player; 89 / FW / MDA / Eugen Sidorenco (at Khimik Dzerzhinsk)

==== Reserve squad ====
Note: Flags indicate national team as defined under FIFA eligibility rules; some limited exceptions apply. Players may hold more than one non-FIFA nationality.

No.	Pos.	Nation	Player
12	GK	RUS	Arbi Mezhiyev
51	GK	RUS	Yuri Alipov
54	DF	RUS	Aleksandr Bukachyov
56	DF	RUS	Pavel Dolgov
57	MF	RUS	Mikhail Gaydamak
58	FW	RUS	Aleksandr Linkin
59	DF	RUS	Stanislav Kondratenko
60	DF	RUS	Yevgeni Ryzhakov
64	MF	RUS	Anton Makurin
65	FW	RUS	Ruslan Salakhutdinov
66	DF	RUS	Vladimir Lebedev

No.	Pos.	Nation	Player
68	MF	RUS	Ivan Kritskiy
71	GK	RUS	Mikhail Dyuzhikov
73	MF	RUS	Andrei Dyrdin
74	MF	RUS	David Nadirashvili
75	MF	RUS	Sultan Aksanov
78	FW	RUS	Pavel Kudryashov
84	DF	RUS	Anton Miterev
85	MF	RUS	Vladimir Pashkevich
87	FW	RUS	Dmitri Sasin
91	MF	RUS	Vladimir Gusev
93	MF	RUS	Aleksandr Moskov

== Transfers ==
=== Summer ===
In: Note: Flags indicate national team as defined under FIFA eligibility rules; some limited exceptions apply. Players may hold more than one non-FIFA nationality.

No.	Pos.	Nation	Player
1	GK	MNE	Mladen Božović (from (Hungary) Videoton)
4	MF	RUS	Yevgeni Bashkirov (from (Russia) Zenit St. Petersburg, previously on loan)
6	MF	ROU	Gabriel Mureșan (from (Romania) CFR Cluj)
9	FW	RUS	Igor Portnyagin (on loan from (Russia) Rubin Kazan)
11	MF	RUS	Pavel Ignatovich (on loan from (Russia) Dynamo Moscow)
15	DF	RUS	Vladimir Kisenkov (from (Russia) Dynamo Moscow)
17	FW	USA	Eugene Starikov (on loan from (Russia) Zenit St. Petersburg)
19	MF	RUS	Maksim Astafyev (from (Russia) Sibir Novosibirsk)
20	DF	BUL	Zhivko Milanov (from (Romania) Vaslui)
21	DF	BLR	Maksim Bardachow (on loan from (Belarus) BATE)
29	FW	CZE	Jan Holenda (on loan from (Russia) FC Rostov)
30	DF	SVK	Kornel Saláta (on loan from (Russia) FC Rostov)
33	DF	RUS	Vladimir Rykov (on loan from (Russia) Dynamo Moscow)
37	MF	RUS	Mikhail Komkov (on loan from (Russia) Kuban Krasnodar)
52	DF	CZE	Martin Jiránek (from (Russia) Terek Grozny)
77	MF	HUN	Ádám Pintér (from (Spain) Zaragoza)
88	FW	RUS	Kirill Panchenko (from (Russia) Mordovia Saransk)
89	MF	MDA	Eugen Sidorenco (from (Israel) Hapoel Nazareth Illit)

Out: Note: Flags indicate national team as defined under FIFA eligibility rules; some limited exceptions apply. Players may hold more than one non-FIFA nationality.

No.	Pos.	Nation	Player
1	GK	RUS	Vitali Astakhov (to (Russia) Gazovik Orenburg)
2	MF	RUS	Aleksandr Dimidko (to (Russia) Mordovia Saransk)
6	MF	RUS	Aleksandr Zotov (end of loan from (Russia) Spartak Moscow)
11	MF	RUS	Andrei Gorbanets (to (Russia) Ural Sverdlovsk Oblast)
15	MF	RUS	Ivan Nagibin (to (Russia) FC Ufa)
20	FW	RUS	Aleksei Sazonov (to (Russia) Syzran-2003 Syzran)
24	DF	RUS	Sergei Bendz (end of loan from (Russia) Kuban Krasnodar)
25	FW	RUS	Anton Khazov (to (Russia) Gazovik Orenburg)
26	DF	RUS	Viktor Stroyev (to (Russia) Fakel Voronezh)
27	FW	RUS	Kirill Pogrebnyak (on loan to (Russia) Fakel Voronezh)
58	DF	RUS	Ilya Zuyev (end of loan from (Russia) Zenit St. Petersburg)
89	FW	UKR	Oleksandr Kasyan (end of loan from (Ukraine) Karpaty Lviv)
—	GK	RUS	Daniil Gavilovskiy (to (Russia) Khimik Dzerzhinsk, previously on loan)
—	DF	RUS	Mikhail Bashilov (on loan to (Russia) Tyumen, previously on loan to (Russia) Irtysh Omsk)
—	DF	RUS	Yaroslav Ovsyannikov (on loan to (Russia) FC Volga Ulyanovsk, previously on loan to (Russia) Sibiryak Bratsk)
—	MF	RUS	Yevgeni Chernov (on loan to (Russia) Khimik Dzerzhinsk, previously on loan to (Russia) Gazovik Orenburg)

=== Winter ===
In: Note: Flags indicate national team as defined under FIFA eligibility rules; some limited exceptions apply. Players may hold more than one non-FIFA nationality.

No.	Pos.	Nation	Player
13	MF	BLR	Pavel Nyakhaychyk (from (Belarus) BATE Borisov)
21	DF	BLR	Maksim Bardachow (from (Belarus) BATE Borisov, previously on loan)

Out: Note: Flags indicate national team as defined under FIFA eligibility rules; some limited exceptions apply. Players may hold more than one non-FIFA nationality.

No.	Pos.	Nation	Player
5	DF	BLR	Syarhey Amelyanchuk
22	DF	BUL	Plamen Nikolov (to (Bulgaria) Litex Lovech)

== Competitions ==
=== Russian Premier League ===
==== Matches ====
16 July 2013 1	Amkar Perm	2 – 0	Tom Tomsk	Perm
20:00 OMST (UTC+7)	Peev 2' (pen.), 10' (pen.)	Summary	Rykov (yellow card) 1' (yellow-red card) 9'	Stadium: Zvezda Stadium; Attendance: 12,250; Referee: Aleksey Eskov

20 July 2013 2	Tom Tomsk	1 – 2	Kuban Krasnodar	Tomsk
19:00 OMST (UTC+7)	Panchenko 24'	Summary	Baldé 6'; Özbiliz 13'	Stadium: Trud Stadium; Attendance: 7,800; Referee: Aleksei Matyunin

27 July 2013 3	Rostov	3 – 0	Tom Tomsk	Rostov-on-Don
23:00 OMST (UTC+7)	Dzyuba 3', 65', 84' (pen.)	Summary		Stadium: Olimp – 2 Attendance: 9,700; Referee: Sergey Lapochkin

3 August 2013 4	Tom Tomsk	1 – 2	Ural	Tomsk
20:20 OMST (UTC+7)	Portnyagin 19' (pen.)	Summary	Tumasyan 2'; Sarkisov 25'	Stadium: Trud Stadium; Attendance: 4,200; Referee: Timur Arslanbekov

18 August 2013 5	Krylia Sovetov	1 – 0	Tom Tomsk	Samara
21:00 OMST (UTC+7)	I.Maksimov (red card) 56'; Tsallagov 61'	Summary		Stadium: Metallurg Stadium; Attendance: 16,074; Referee: Mikhail Belov

24 August 2013 6	Tom Tomsk	1 – 2	CSKA Moscow	Tomsk
19:00 OMST (UTC+7)	Portnyagin 30'	Summary	Doumbia 51'; Musa 58'	Stadium: Trud Stadium; Attendance: 9,700; Referee: Sergei Ivanov

1 September 2013 7	Spartak Moscow	2 – 1	Tom Tomsk	Moscow
18:45 OMST (UTC+7)	Movsisyan 45+3'; Yakovlev 76'	Summary	Rykov 7'	Stadium: Lokomotiv Stadium; Attendance: 9,150; Referee: Maxim Layushkin

15 September 2013 8	Tom Tomsk	2 – 2	Anzhi Makhachkala	Tomsk
19:45 OMST (UTC+7)	Holenda 30'; Portnyagin 48' (pen.) (yellow card) 71'; Sorokin (yellow card) 90+2'	Summary	Agalarov (yellow card) 16'; Epureanu (yellow card) 47'; Solomatin 53' (pen.); Burmistrov 64'	Stadium: Trud Stadium; Attendance: 5,300; Referee: Igor Nizovtsev

22 September 2013 9	Rubin Kazan'	1 – 2	Tom Tomsk	Kazan
19:00 OMST (UTC+7)	Rondón 15'; Ryazantsev (red card) 33'	Summary	Panchenko 34' (pen.); Bardachow 87'	Stadium: Central Stadium; Attendance: 7,044; Referee: Vyacheslav Kharlamov

26 September 2013 10	Tom Tomsk	1 – 0	Volga Nizhny Novgorod	Tomsk
19:00 OMST (UTC+7)	Golyshev 56'	Summary	Aldonin (yellow card) 43' (yellow-red card) 45'	Stadium: Trud Stadium; Attendance: 4,100; Referee: Vladimir Seldyakov

30 September 2013 11	Lokomotiv Moscow	0 – 0	Tom Tomsk	Moscow
21:15 OMST (UTC+7)	Diarra (yellow card) 90+1' (yellow-red card)	Report	Bardachow (yellow card) 82' (yellow-red card)	Stadium: Lokomotiv Stadium; Attendance: 8,460; Referee: Sergey Kuznetsov

6 October 2013 12	Tom Tomsk	0 – 3	Zenit St. Petersburg	Tomsk
18:45 OMST (UTC+7)		Summary	Hulk 18'; Danny 41'; Witsel 64'	Stadium: Trud Stadium; Attendance: 9,500; Referee: Alexey Eskov

19 October 2013 13	Krasnodar	4 – 0	Tom Tomsk	Kuban Stadium
19:00 OMST (UTC+7)	Mamayev 4'; Gazinskiy 55'; Joãozinho 71'; Ari 73'	Summary		Stadium: Krasnodar; Attendance: 16,700; Referee: Vasiliy Kazartsev

26 October 2013 14	Tom Tomsk	0 – 0	Terek Grozny	Tomsk
16:30 OMST (UTC+7)		Summary	Kudryashov (yellow card) 20' (yellow-red card) 74'	Stadium: Trud Stadium; Attendance: 4,200; Referee: Alexy Nikolaev

2 November 2013 15	Dynamo Moscow	1 – 0	Tom Tomsk	Moscow
19:00 OMST (UTC+7)	Bardachow 42' (o.g.)	Summary		Stadium: Arena Khimki; Attendance: 3,045; Referee: Sergei Ivanov

9 November 2013 16	Tom Tomsk	2 – 0	Lokomotiv Moscow	Tomsk
16:30 OMST (UTC+7)	Bashkirov 4'; Ignatovich 39' (pen.)	Report	Tarasov; (yellow card) 30' (yellow-red card) 44'	Stadium: Trud Stadium; Attendance: 4,600; Referee: Vasili Kazartsev

23 November 2013 17	Tom Tomsk	0 – 1	Rubin Kazan'	Trud Stadium
15:30 OMST (UTC+7)	Golyshev (red card) 63'	Summary	Kislyak 80'	Stadium: Tomsk; Attendance: 3,200; Referee: Igor Nizovtsev

2 December 2013 18	Anzhi Makhachkala	0 – 2	Tom Tomsk	Kaspiysk
20:00 OMST (UTC+7)		Summary	Panchenko 42'; Komkov 74'	Stadium: Anzhi-Arena; Attendance: 5,600; Referee: Sergey Karasev

8 December 2013 19	Terek Grozny	2 – 0	Tom Tomsk	Grozny
19:30 OMST (UTC+7)	Bokila 20'; Aílton 90+3' (pen.)	Summary	Kisenkov (yellow card) 11' (yellow-red card) 73'; Vašek (red card) 90+1'	Stadium: Terek Stadium; Attendance: 12,350; Referee: Aleksandr Egorov

9 March 2014 20	Zenit St. Petersburg	0 – 0	Tom Tomsk	Saint Petersburg
21:30 OMST (UTC+7)		Summary		Stadium: Petrovsky Stadium; Attendance: 18,205; Referee: Igor Fedotov

17 March 2013 21	Tom Tomsk	1 – 1	Krasnodar	Tomsk
19:30 OMST (UTC+7)	Panchenko 60'	Summary	Wánderson 88'	Stadium: Trud Stadium; Attendance: 1,950; Referee: Timur Arslanbekov

22 March 2014 22	Volga Nizhny Novgorod	0 – 1	Tom Tomsk	Nizhny Novgorod
17:00 OMST (UTC+7)		Summary	Holenda 90+1'	Stadium: Lokomotiv Stadium; Attendance: 4,800; Referee: Sergey Lapochkin

30 March 2014 23	Tom Tomsk	1 – 3	Dynamo Moscow	Tomsk
18:45 OMST (UTC+7)	Rykov 48'	Summary	Kokorin 51'; Kurányi 64'; Ionov 87'	Stadium: Trud Stadium; Attendance: 4,550; Referee: Aleksandr Egorov

4 April 2014 24	Kuban Krasnodar	2 – 0	Tom Tomsk	Krasnodar
21:15 OMST (UTC+7)	Armaș 67'; Popov 85'	Summary		Stadium: Kuban Stadium; Attendance: 8,117; Referee: Igor Fedotov

12 April 2014 25	Tom Tomsk	0 – 0	Amkar Perm	Tomsk
15:00 OMST (UTC+7)		Summary		Stadium: Trud Stadium; Attendance: 3,200; Referee: Alexey Nikolaev

19 April 2014 26	Tom Tomsk	2 – 0	Krylia Sovetov	Tomsk
16:00 OMST (UTC+7)	Sabitov 28'; Holenda 30'	Summary		Stadium: Trud Stadium; Attendance: 4,500; Referee: Sergey Karasev

26 April 2014 27	Ural	0 – 0	Tom Tomsk	Yekaterinburg
18:00 OMST (UTC+7)		Summary		Stadium: Central Stadium; Attendance: 8,100; Referee: Vitali Meshkov

3 May 2014 28	Tom Tomsk	2 – 1	Spartak Moscow	Tomsk
17:00 OMST (UTC+7)	Panchenko 53' (pen.); Nyakhaychyk (red card) 57'; Portnyagin 61'	Summary	Movsisyan 85'; Dykan (red card) 90'	Stadium: Trud Stadium; Attendance: 10,000; Referee: Vladislav Bezborodov

11 May 2014 29	CSKA Moscow	2 – 0	Tom Tomsk	Moscow
18:45 OMST (UTC+7)	Sabitov 62' (o.g.); Doumbia 90'	Summary		Stadium: Arena Khimki; Attendance: 7,500; Referee: Igor Nizovtsev

15 May 2014 30	Tom Tomsk	3 – 2	Rostov	Tomsk
21:30 OMST (UTC+7)	Nyakhaychyk 7'; Panchenko 52', 55'	Summary	Poloz 83'; Kanga (red card) 84'; Pongolle 89'	Stadium: Trud Stadium; Attendance: 4,500; Referee: Timur Arslanbekov

==== League table ====
Pos	Team	Pld	W	D	L	GF	GA	GD	Pts	Qualification or relegation
11	Ural Sverdlovsk Oblast	30	9	7	14	28	46	−18	34	
12	Terek Grozny	30	8	9	13	27	33	−6	33	
13	Tom Tomsk (R)	30	8	7	15	23	39	−16	31	Qualification for the Relegation play-offs
14	Krylia Sovetov Samara (R)	30	6	11	13	27	46	−19	29	Qualification for the Relegation play-offs
15	Volga Nizhny Novgorod (R)	30	6	3	21	22	65	−43	21	Relegation to Football National League

Source: Russian Premier League
Rules for classification: 1) points; 2) number of wins; 3) head-to-head points; 4) number of head-to-head wins; 5) head-to-head goal difference; 6) number of head-to-head goals scored; 7) number of head-to-head away goals scored; 8) goal difference; 9) number of goals scored; 10) number of away goals scored; 11) position in the 2012–13 season (only used until all the regularly scheduled games have been played); 11) extra play-off game or tournament between the teams in question.
(R) Relegated

=== Relegation play-offs ===
18 May 2014 1st leg	Ufa	5 – 1	Tom Tomsk	Ufa
18:00 OMST (UTC+7)	Golubov 4' (pen.), 10', 24', 61'; William Oliveira 83'	Summary	Panchenko 56'	Stadium: Dynamo Stadium; Attendance: 4,500; Referee: Sergei Karasev

22 May 2014 2nd leg	Tom Tomsk	3 – 1 (4 – 6 agg.)	Ufa	Tomsk
19:00 OMST (UTC+7)	Bashkirov 4'; Golyshev 23'; Portnyagin 73'	Summary	Golubov 13'	Stadium: Trud Stadium; Attendance: 7,500; Referee: Vladislav Bezborodov

=== Russian Cup ===
30 October 2013 Fifth Round	Gazovik Orenburg	0 – 1 (a.e.t.)	Tom Tomsk	Orenburg
18:00 OMST (UTC+7)		Summary	Astafyev 118'	Stadium: Gazovik Stadium; Attendance: 3,800; Referee: Vladimir Kazmenko

13 March 2014 Round of 16	Tom Tomsk	2 – 1	Tyumen	Tomsk
18:30 OMST (UTC+7)	Saláta 12'; Portnyagin 59' (pen.)	Summary	Fursin 80'	Stadium: Trud Stadium; Attendance: 2,500; Referee: Alexei Nikolaev

26 March 2014 Quarter-finals	Tom Tomsk	1 – 1 (a.e.t.) (1 – 2 p)	Luch-Energiya Vladivostok	Novosibirsk
19:00 OMST (UTC+7)	Portnyagin 33'	Summary	Romanovich (yellow card) 45' (yellow-red card); Klopkov 62'	Stadium: Spartak Stadium; Attendance: 700; Referee: Kiril Levnikov
	Penalties
	Portnyagin (penalty missed); Golyshev (penalty missed); Nyakhaychyk (penalty missed); Milanov (penalty missed); Sorokin (penalty scored)		(penalty scored) Koryan; (penalty missed) Klopkov; (penalty missed) Mavletdinov; (penalty missed) Bendz; (penalty scored) Ponomaryov

== Squad statistics ==
=== Appearances and goals ===
No.	Pos	Nat	Player	Total		Premier League		Play-offs		Russian Cup	
No.	Pos	Nat	Player	Apps	Goals	Apps	Goals	Apps	Goals	Apps	Goals
1	GK	(Montenegro) MNE	Mladen Božović	7	0	7	0	0	0	0	0
3	DF	(Russia) RUS	Aleksei Aravin	14	0	9+2	0	0	0	3	0
4	MF	(Russia) RUS	Yevgeni Bashkirov	26	2	20+2	1	2	1	1+1	0
6	MF	(Romania) ROU	Gabriel Mureșan	22	0	18+3	0	0	0	0+1	0
7	MF	(Russia) RUS	Valeri Sorokin	12	0	7+4	0	0	0	0+1	0
8	FW	(Russia) RUS	Nikita Bazhenov	16	0	3+10	0	0	0	3	0
9	FW	(Russia) RUS	Igor Portnyagin	32	7	22+6	4	2	1	2	2
10	FW	(Russia) RUS	Pavel Golyshev	28	2	17+7	1	2	1	2	0
11	MF	(Russia) RUS	Pavel Ignatovich	27	1	17+8	1	1	0	1	0
13	MF	(Belarus) BLR	Pavel Nyakhaychyk	13	1	8+2	1	1+1	0	0+1	0
14	MF	(Russia) RUS	Aleksandr Cherevko	11	0	0+7	0	1	0	3	0
15	DF	(Russia) RUS	Vladimir Kisenkov	7	0	7	0	0	0	0	0
17	FW	(United States) USA	Eugene Starikov	1	0	1	0	0	0	0	0
18	GK	(Czech Republic) CZE	Petr Vašek	14	0	13	0	0	0	1	0
20	DF	(Bulgaria) BUL	Zhivko Milanov	33	0	28	0	2	0	2+1	0
21	DF	(Belarus) BLR	Maksim Bardachow	24	1	23	1	1	0	0	0
25	GK	(Moldova) MDA	Ilie Cebanu	14	0	10	0	2	0	2	0
29	FW	(Czech Republic) CZE	Jan Holenda	22	3	17+2	3	0+2	0	0+1	0
30	DF	(Slovakia) SVK	Kornel Saláta	10	2	7	1	0	0	3	1
33	DF	(Russia) RUS	Vladimir Rykov	30	2	27	2	2	0	1	0
34	DF	(Russia) RUS	Renat Sabitov	10	1	6+1	1	2	0	1	0
37	MF	(Russia) RUS	Mikhail Komkov	16	0	4+8	0	0+1	0	2+1	0
52	DF	(Czech Republic) CZE	Martin Jiránek	22	0	20	0	2	0	0	0
63	DF	(Russia) RUS	Denis Terentyev	3	0	0+1	0	0+1	0	1	0
77	MF	(Hungary) HUN	Ádám Pintér	13	0	2+7	0	0+1	0	3	0
88	FW	(Russia) RUS	Kirill Panchenko	30	8	23+4	7	2	1	0+1	0
Players away from the club on loan:
19	MF	(Russia) RUS	Maksim Astafyev	10	1	3+6	0	0	0	0+1	1
89	FW	(Moldova) MDA	Eugen Sidorenco	7	0	1+5	0	0	0	1	0
Players who appeared for Tom Tomsk that left during the season:
5	DF	(Belarus) BLR	Syarhey Amelyanchuk	8	0	7	0	0	0	1	0
22	DF	(Bulgaria) BUL	Plamen Nikolov	3	0	3	0	0	0	0	0

=== Top scorers ===
Place	Position	Nation	Number	Name	Russian Premier League	Relegation Play-offs	Russian Cup	Total
1	FW	(Russia)	88	Kirill Panchenko	7	1	0	8
2	FW	(Russia)	9	Igor Portnyagin	4	1	2	7
3	FW	(Czech Republic)	29	Jan Holenda	3	0	0	3
4	DF	(Russia)	33	Vladimir Rykov	2	0	0	2
4	MF	(Russia)	4	Yevgeni Bashkirov	1	1	0	2
4	FW	(Russia)	10	Pavel Golyshev	1	1	0	2
4	DF	(Slovakia)	30	Kornel Saláta	1	0	1	2
8	MF	(Russia)	11	Pavel Ignatovich	1	0	0	1
8	DF	(Belarus)	21	Maksim Bardachow	1	0	0	1
8	MF	(Russia)	34	Renat Sabitov	1	0	0	1
8	MF	(Belarus)	13	Pavel Nyakhaychyk	1	0	0	1
8	MF	(Russia)	19	Maksim Astafyev	0	0	1	1
				TOTALS	23	4	4	31

=== Disciplinary record ===
Number	Nation	Position	Name	Russian Premier League		Relegation Play-offs		Russian Cup		Total	
Number	Nation	Position	Name	Yellow card	Red card	Yellow card	Red card	Yellow card	Red card	Yellow card	Red card
1	(Montenegro)	GK	Mladen Božović	1	0	0	0	0	0	1	0
3	(Russia)	DF	Aleksei Aravin	2	0	0	0	2	0	4	0
4	(Russia)	MF	Yevgeni Bashkirov	6	0	0	0	0	0	6	0
5	(Belarus)	DF	Syarhey Amelyanchuk	4	0	0	0	0	0	4	0
6	(Romania)	MF	Gabriel Mureșan	5	0	0	0	1	0	6	0
7	(Russia)	MF	Valeri Sorokin	1	0	0	0	0	0	1	0
9	(Russia)	FW	Igor Portnyagin	2	0	0	0	0	0	2	0
10	(Russia)	FW	Pavel Golyshev	2	1	0	0	0	0	2	1
11	(Russia)	MF	Pavel Ignatovich	6	0	0	0	0	0	6	0
13	(Belarus)	MF	Pavel Nyakhaychyk	0	1	0	0	0	0	0	1
14	(Russia)	MF	Aleksandr Cherevko	0	0	1	0	1	0	2	0
15	(Russia)	DF	Vladimir Kisenkov	6	1	0	0	0	0	6	1
18	(Czech Republic)	GK	Petr Vašek	1	1	0	0	0	0	1	1
20	(Bulgaria)	DF	Zhivko Milanov	9	0	0	0	0	0	9	0
21	(Belarus)	DF	Maksim Bardachow	5	1	0	0	0	0	5	1
25	(Moldova)	GK	Ilie Cebanu	1	0	0	0	0	0	1	0
29	(Czech Republic)	FW	Jan Holenda	2	0	0	0	0	0	2	0
30	(Slovakia)	DF	Kornel Saláta	2	0	0	0	0	0	2	0
33	(Russia)	DF	Vladimir Rykov	8	1	0	0	0	0	8	1
37	(Russia)	MF	Mikhail Komkov	1	0	0	0	2	0	3	0
77	(Hungary)	MF	Ádám Pintér	0	0	0	0	1	0	1	0
88	(Russia)	FW	Kirill Panchenko	4	0	0	0	0	0	4	0
			TOTALS	68	6	1	0	7	0	76	6
