= 2011–12 FC Tom Tomsk season =

Tom Tomsk
2011–12 season
- Chairman: Sergei Ilinykh; Until round 32; Sergei Zhvachkin; From round 33
- Manager: Valeri Nepomniachi until 19 September 2011; Vasili Baskakov (caretaker)19–27 September 2011; Sergei Perednya from 27 September 2011
- Stadium: Trud Stadium
- Russian Premier League: Ongoing, 16th
- Russian Cup: Last 16
- Top goalscorer: League: Golyshev (7); All: Golyshev (7)
- Highest home attendance: 11,200; 24 Apr vs CSKA
- Lowest home attendance: 7,500; 27 Nov vs Krasnodar
Home colours	Away colours	Third colours

The 2011–12 Tom Tomsk season was the 7th straight season that the club played in the Russian Premier League, the highest tier of football in Russia.

== Current squad ==
Updated 25 February 2012. Note: Flags indicate national team as defined under FIFA eligibility rules; some limited exceptions apply. Players may hold more than one non-FIFA nationality.

No.	Pos.	Nation	Player
1	GK	RUS	Aleksei Botvinyev
3	MF	RUS	Valeri Klimov
4	DF	BLR	Sergey Sosnovski
5	DF	BLR	Syarhey Amelyanchuk
7	MF	RUS	Aleksei Rebko
8	MF	RUS	Dmitri Malyaka
9	FW	RUS	Igor Portnyagin (on loan from Rubin)
11	MF	RUS	Alan Gatagov (on loan from Dinamo)
13	DF	RUS	Ilya Gultyayev
15	DF	RUS	Ruslan Nakhushev
17	DF	RUS	Andrei Ivanov (on loan from Lokomotiv)
18	GK	CZE	Petr Vašek
21	MF	RUS	Denis Boyarintsev
22	DF	BUL	Plamen Nikolov

No.	Pos.	Nation	Player
23	MF	RUS	Yevgeni Balyaikin (on loan from Rubin)
24	DF	RUS	Dmitri Smirnov
25	FW	RUS	Anton Khazov
26	DF	RUS	Viktor Stroyev
32	FW	RUS	Nikita Bazhenov
51	GK	RUS	Vladimir Ageev
52	DF	RUS	Ilya Protasov
55	GK	MDA	Ilie Cebanu
61	GK	RUS	Daniil Gavilovskiy
67	MF	RUS	Emin Makhmudov (on loan from Spartak)
78	FW	RUS	Kirill Pogrebnyak
86	MF	ROU	Adrian Ropotan (on loan from Dinamo)
90	GK	RUS	Mikhail Filippov
97	DF	RUS	Dmitry Tikhonov

== Transfers ==
=== Winter ===
In: Note: Flags indicate national team as defined under FIFA eligibility rules; some limited exceptions apply. Players may hold more than one non-FIFA nationality.

No.	Pos.	Nation	Player
1	GK	RUS	Aleksei Botvinyev (from (Russia) Saturn Moscow Oblast)
4	DF	BLR	Sergey Sosnovski (from (Belarus) BATE Borisov)
14	MF	RUS	Anton Kozlov (from (Russia) Saturn Moscow Oblast)
17	MF	RUS	Pavel Golyshev (from (Russia) Spartak Moscow)
20	DF	BLR	Yan Tsiharow (from (Ukraine) Metalurh Zaporizhya)
23	MF	RUS	Yevgeni Balyaikin (on loan from (Russia) Rubin Kazan)
30	GK	RUS	Sergei Pesyakov (on loan from (Russia) Spartak Moscow)
32	FW	RUS	Nikita Bazhenov (from (Russia) Spartak Moscow)
34	MF	RUS	Renat Sabitov (from (Russia) Spartak Moscow)
45	MF	RUS	Yevgeni Goryachev
48	DF	RUS	Aleksandr Moskov
49	FW	RUS	Aleksandr Bogdanov
62	MF	RUS	Dmitri Nikitinsky (from (Russia) Saturn Moscow Oblast)
68	DF	RUS	Nikolai Pogrebnyak
71	GK	RUS	Gleb Sochavo
75	MF	RUS	Sultan Aksanov
78	FW	RUS	Kirill Pogrebnyak
79	DF	RUS	Yaroslav Ovsyannikov
97	DF	RUS	Dmitri Tikhonov (from (Russia) Dynamo Moscow)
99	FW	RUS	Maksim Kanunnikov (on loan from (Russia) Zenit St. Petersburg)

Out: Note: Flags indicate national team as defined under FIFA eligibility rules; some limited exceptions apply. Players may hold more than one non-FIFA nationality.

No.	Pos.	Nation	Player
2	DF	RUS	Ivan Tuyev (on loan to (Russia) Khimik Dzerzhinsk)
6	MF	RUS	Dmitri Michkov (to (Russia) Krasnodar)
9	MF	MDA	Serghei Covalciuc (to (Russia) Zhemchuzhina-Sochi)
10	FW	MKD	Goran Maznov (to (Greece) Kerkyra)
12	GK	UZB	Aleksei Poliakov (to (Russia) Lokomotiv-2 Moscow)
20	FW	RUS	Artyom Dzyuba (end of loan from (Russia) Spartak Moscow)
21	DF	SRB	Nikola Petković (end of loan from (Germany) Eintracht Frankfurt)
22	DF	KOR	Park Hyo-Sang (released)
23	DF	RUS	Georgi Dzhioyev (to (Russia) Zhemchuzhina-Sochi)
25	GK	EST	Sergei Pareiko (to (Poland) Wisła Kraków)
28	DF	RUS	Konstantin Dmitriyevskiy (to (Russia) Irtysh Omsk)
29	DF	RUS	Nikita Konovalov (released)
33	MF	JPN	Daisuke Matsui (end of loan from (France) Grenoble)
36	DF	RUS	Fyodor Kudryashov (end of loan from (Russia) Spartak Moscow)
41	GK	RUS	Fyodor Burdykin (to (Russia) Torpedo Vladimir)
43	FW	RUS	Roman Zharikov (on loan to (Russia) Khimik Dzerzhinsk)
62	DF	RUS	Artur Zaks (to (Russia) Volochanin-Ratmir Vyshny Volochyok)
70	MF	RUS	Valentin Gaponov (to (Russia) Yakutiya Yakutsk)
70	FW	RUS	Artyom Korotya (released)
73	DF	RUS	Ilya Gerdt (released)
75	MF	RUS	Viktor Svezhov (end of loan from (Russia) Dynamo Moscow)
81	MF	HUN	Norbert Németh (to (Hungary) Vasas)
90	MF	RUS	Denis Pshenichnikov (released)
—	GK	RUS	Yevgeni Gorodov (to (Russia) Krasnodar, previously on loan to (Russia) Shinnik Yaroslavl)
—	GK	RUS	Yegor Ridosh (to (Russia) Khimik Dzerzhinsk, previously on loan)
—	DF	RUS	Sergei Golyatkin (to (Russia) SKA-Energiya Khabarovsk, previously on loan)
—	DF	RUS	Dmitri Sergeyev (to (Russia) Irtysh Omsk, previously on loan to (Russia) Dynamo Barnaul)
—	MF	RUS	Alexey Yakimov (released, previously on loan to (Russia) Khimik Dzerzhinsk)
—	FW	RUS	Anton Arkhipov (to (Russia) Shinnik Yaroslavl, previously on loan)
—	FW	RUS	Yevgeni Ponomaryov (released, previously on loan to (Russia) Radian-Baikal Irkutsk)
—	FW	RUS	Sergei Voronov (to (Russia) KUZBASS Kemerovo, previously on loan)

=== Summer ===
In: Note: Flags indicate national team as defined under FIFA eligibility rules; some limited exceptions apply. Players may hold more than one non-FIFA nationality.

No.	Pos.	Nation	Player
9	MF	RUS	Denis Laktionov (ended retirement, previously coach at the club)
10	FW	RUS	Yevgeny Savin (from (Russia) Krylia Sovetov Samara)
15	DF	RUS	Ruslan Nakhushev (on loan from (Russia) Lokomotiv Moscow)
21	MF	RUS	Denis Boyarintsev (from (Russia) Zhemchuzhina-Sochi)
22	DF	ROU	Ovidiu Dănănae (from (Romania) Universitatea Craiova)
61	GK	RUS	Daniil Gavilovskiy (from (Russia) Dynamo Barnaul)
86	MF	ROU	Adrian Ropotan (on loan from (Russia) Dynamo Moscow)
90	GK	RUS	Mikhail Filippov (from (Russia) Saturn-2 Moscow Oblast)
—	MF	RUS	Aleksei Rebko (from (Russia) Rostov)

Out: Note: Flags indicate national team as defined under FIFA eligibility rules; some limited exceptions apply. Players may hold more than one non-FIFA nationality.

No.	Pos.	Nation	Player
11	MF	UKR	Kyrylo Kovalchuk (on loan to (Ukraine) Chornomorets Odesa)
14	MF	RUS	Anton Kozlov (to (Russia) Baltika Kaliningrad)
18	DF	RUS	Vladislav Khatazhyonkov (to (Russia) Sibir Novosibirsk)
88	GK	RUS	Ivan Komissarov (end of loan from (Russia) Spartak Moscow)

=== Winter ===
In: Note: Flags indicate national team as defined under FIFA eligibility rules; some limited exceptions apply. Players may hold more than one non-FIFA nationality.

No.	Pos.	Nation	Player
5	DF	BLR	Syarhey Amelyanchuk (from (Russia) Terek Grozny)
7	MF	RUS	Aleksei Rebko (from (Russia) Rostov)
8	MF	RUS	Dmitri Malyaka (from (Russia) MITOS Novocherkassk)
9	MF	RUS	Igor Portnyagin (on loan from (Russia) Rubin Kazan)
11	MF	RUS	Alan Gatagov (on loan from (Russia) Dynamo Moscow)
17	DF	RUS	Andrei Ivanov (on loan from (Russia) Lokomotiv Moscow)
18	GK	CZE	Petr Vašek (from (Russia) Sibir Novosibirsk)
22	DF	BUL	Plamen Nikolov (on loan from (Bulgaria) Litex Lovech)
25	FW	RUS	Anton Khazov (from (Russia) Volga Nizhny Novgorod)
37	MF	RUS	Aleksandr Nikonov
41	MF	RUS	Vladislav Kudinov
54	MF	RUS	Aleksei Sakhno
55	GK	MDA	Ilie Cebanu (on loan from (Russia) Rubin Kazan)
67	MF	RUS	Emin Makhmudov (on loan from (Russia) Spartak Moscow)
70	MF	RUS	Yevgeni Konstantinovskiy
83	MF	RUS	Vyacheslav Larents
94	MF	RUS	Ivan Rukavitsyn
99	DF	RUS	Yevgeni Chinyayev

Out: Note: Flags indicate national team as defined under FIFA eligibility rules; some limited exceptions apply. Players may hold more than one non-FIFA nationality.

No.	Pos.	Nation	Player
5	MF	RUS	Sergei Skoblyakov (to (Russia) Khimki)
7	FW	USA	Eugene Starikov (end of loan from (Russia) Zenit St. Petersburg)
9	FW	RUS	Denis Laktionov (released)
10	FW	RUS	Yevgeny Savin (to (Russia) Ural Sverdlovsk Oblast)
17	MF	RUS	Pavel Golyshev (to (Russia) Krasnodar)
20	MF	BLR	Yan Tsiharow (to (Russia) Lokomotiv Moscow)
22	DF	ROU	Ovidiu Dănănae (to (Romania) Steaua București)
30	GK	RUS	Sergei Pesyakov (end of loan from (Russia) Spartak Moscow)
34	DF	RUS	Renat Sabitov (to (Russia) Sibir Novosibirsk)
37	DF	SRB	Đorđe Jokić (to (Russia) Dynamo Bryansk)
52	DF	RUS	Ilya Protasov (to (Russia) Sibir-2 Novosibirsk)
55	MF	KOR	Kim Nam-Il (to (South Korea) Incheon United)
57	FW	RUS	Artyom Nozdrunov (released)
69	DF	RUS	Maksim Suvorov (released)
83	MF	RUS	Aleksandr Kharitonov (to (Russia) Volga Nizhny Novgorod)
99	FW	RUS	Maksim Kanunnikov (end of loan from (Russia) Zenit St. Petersburg)

== Competitions ==
=== Russian Premier League ===
==== Results ====
14 March 2011 1	Volga	2–0	Tom Tomsk	Nizhny Novgorod, Nizhny Novgorod Oblast
15:45	Martsvaladze 5'; Bendz 15'	Report		Stadium: Lokomotiv Stadium; Attendance: 14,000; Referee: Vladimir Kazmenko

20 March 2011 2	Tom Tomsk	0–1	Kuban Krasnodar	Tomsk, Tomsk Oblast
09:00		Report	Davydov 83'	Stadium: Trud Stadium; Attendance: 10,200; Referee: Alexey Nikolaev

4 April 2011 3	Terek	2–0	Tom Tomsk	Grozny, Chechnya
15:00	Maurício 14' (pen.); Tiuí 21'	Report		Stadium: Sultan Bilimkhanov Stadium; Attendance: 9,000; Referee: Aleksey Eskov

11 April 2011 4	Tom Tomsk	0–0	Anzhi	Tomsk, Tomsk Oblast
12:00		Report		Stadium: Trud Stadium; Attendance: 11,000; Referee: Yuri Baskakov

17 April 2011 5	Spartak Nalchik	1–2	Tom Tomsk	Nalchik, Kabardino-Balkaria
14:00	Portnyagin 87'	Report	Golyshev 3'; Jokić 11'	Stadium: Spartak Stadium; Attendance: 4,100; Referee: Almir Kayumov

23 April 2011 6	Tom Tomsk	1–1	CSKA	Tomsk, Tomsk Oblast
	Kanunnikov 60'	Report	Doumbia 28'	Stadium: Trud Stadium; Attendance: 11,200; Referee: Vyacheslav Popov

30 April 2011 7	Amkar	1–2	Tom Tomsk	Perm, Perm Krai
	Ristić 14'	Summary	Golyshev 40', 48'	Stadium: Zvezda Stadium; Attendance: 8,200; Referee: Vladimir Kazmenko

6 May 2011 8	Tom Tomsk	1–1	Krylia Sovetov	Tomsk, Tomsk Oblast
	Jokić 61'	Summary	Kuznetsov 88'	Stadium: Trud Stadium; Attendance: 10,000; Referee: Timur Arslanbekov

13 May 2011 9	Krasnodar	2–2	Tom Tomsk	Krasnodar, Krasnodar Krai
	Shipitsin 30'; Picuşceac 30'	Summary	Golyshev 56', 70' (pen.); Sabitov (red card) 61'	Stadium: Kuban Stadium; Attendance: 6,000; Referee: Alexey Nikolaev

20 May 2011 10	Tom Tomsk	2–1	Zenit	Tomsk, Tomsk Oblast
	Starikov 37'; Golyshev 52'	Summary	Ionov 41'	Stadium: Trud Stadium; Attendance: 11,000

26 May 2011 11	Rubin	4–1	Tom Tomsk	Kazan, Tatarstan
15:45	Ryazantsev 7'; Medvedev 32'; Noboa 58'; Natcho 76' (pen.)	Summary	Skoblyakov 38' (pen.)	Stadium: Central Stadium; Attendance: 12,300; Referee: Maxim Layushkin

9 June 2011 12	Tom Tomsk	2–2	Lokomotiv	Tomsk, Tomsk Oblast
	Yanbayev 14' (o.g.); Kanunnikov 37'	Summary	Ibričić 74'; Ignatyev 81'	Stadium: Trud Stadium; Attendance: 10,500

13 June 2011 13	Tom Tomsk	1–1	Spartak	Tomsk, Tomsk Oblast
	Kanunnikov 90+1'	Summary	Artyom Dzyuba	Stadium: Trud Stadium; Attendance: 11,000

17 June 2011 14	Dynamo	3–0	Tom Tomsk	Moscow
	Samedov 27'; Kevin Kurányi 38'; Kokorin 44'	Summary		Stadium: Arena Khimki; Attendance: 6,484

21 June 2011 15	Tom Tomsk	1–1	Rostov	Tomsk, Tomsk Oblast
	Kanunnikov 66' (pen.)	Summary	Okoronkwo (red card) 64'; Adamov 82' (pen.)	Stadium: Trud Stadium; Attendance: 9,000

25 June 2011 16	Tom Tomsk	0–3	Volga	Tomsk, Tomsk Oblast
		Summary	Martsvaladze 18', 45'; Adzhindzhal 90+2'	Stadium: Trud Stadium; Attendance: 8,000

22 July 2011 17	Kuban	1–3	Tom Tomsk	Krasnodar, Krasnodar Krai
	Davydov 59' (pen.)	Summary	Smirnov 37'; Golyshev 62', 72' (pen.)	Stadium: Kuban Stadium; Attendance: 15,000

29 July 2011 18	Tom Tomsk	0–1	Terek	Tomsk, Tomsk Oblast
		Summary	Asildarov 51'	Stadium: Trud Stadium; Attendance: 9,000

6 August 2011 19	Anzhi	2–0	Tomsk	Makhachkala, Dagestan
18:45 MSK	Prudnikov 17'; Gadzhiyev 83'	Summary		Stadium: Dynamo Stadium; Attendance: 15100; Referee: Sergey Karasev

12 August 2011 20	Tom Tomsk	0–2	Spartak Nalchik	Tomsk, Tomsk Oblast
		Summary	Shchanitsin 75'; Siradze 90+2'	Stadium: Trud Stadium; Attendance: 8,000

20 August 2011 21	CSKA	3–0	Tom Tomsk	Moscow
18:00	Doumbia 51', 68'; Honda 63'	Summary		Stadium: Arena Khimki; Attendance: 7,000; Referee: Vitali Meshkov

26 August 2011 22	Tom Tomsk	0–0	Amkar	Tomsk, Tomsk Oblast
		Summary		Stadium: Trud Stadium; Attendance: 8,200

10 September 2011 23	Krylia Sovetov	2–0	Tom Tomsk	Samara, Samara Oblast
	Kornilenko 8'; Yakovlev 45'	Summary		Stadium: Metallurg Stadium; Attendance: 13,700

16 September 2011 24	Tom Tomsk	0–4	Krasnodar	Tomsk, Tomsk Oblast
		Summary	Joãozinho 39'; Erokhin 55'; Movsisyan 90+2'; Rui Miguel 90+3'	Stadium: Trud Stadium; Attendance: 8,200

23 September 2011 25	Zenit	4–0	Tom Tomsk	Saint Petersburg
	Fayzulin 4'; Shirokov 24'; Kerzhakov 43', 54'	Summary		Stadium: Petrovsky Stadium; Attendance: 19,000

1 October 2011 26	Tom Tomsk	0–2	Rubin	Tomsk, Tomsk Oblast
		Summary	Bocchetti 51', 84'	Stadium: Trud Stadium; Attendance: 8,000

15 October 2011 27	Lokomotiv	3–0	Tom Tomsk	Moscow
	Ibričić 20' (pen.); Glushakov 56'; Sychev 63'	Summary	Dănănae (yellow card) 6' (yellow-red card) 19'	Stadium: Lokomotiv Stadium; Attendance: 10,905

22 October 2011 28	Spartak	4–0	Tom Tomsk	Moscow
	Suchý 10'; Ari 44', 89'; Kayumov 84'	Summary		Stadium: Luzhniki Stadium; Attendance: 8,650

27 October 2011 29	Tom Tomsk	0–2	Dynamo	Tomsk, Tomsk Oblast
		Summary	Misimović; Kurányi 39'; Granat (yellow card) 24' (yellow-red card) 65'	Stadium: Trud Stadium; Attendance: 8,200

5 November 2011 30	Rostov	2–1	Tom Tomsk	Rostov-on-Don, Rostov Oblast
	Bracamonte 20'; Saláta (yellow card) 8' (yellow-red card) 74'; Cociş 90'	Summary	Stroyev 68'	Stadium: Olimp – 2

==== Table ====
Pos	Team	Pld	W	D	L	GF	GA	GD	Pts	Qualification
12	Volga Nizhny Novgorod	30	8	4	18	24	40	−16	28	Qualification to Relegation group
13	Amkar Perm	30	6	9	15	20	39	−19	27 (Note: Amkar Perm ahead of Krylia Sovetov on head-to-head points; Amkar Perm–Krylia Sovetov 1–1, Krylia Sovetov–Amkar Perm 1–1.)	Qualification to Relegation group
14	Krylia Sovetov Samara	30	6	9	15	21	43	−22	27	Qualification to Relegation group
15	Spartak Nalchik	30	5	9	16	23	40	−17	24	Qualification to Relegation group
16	Tom Tomsk	30	4	8	18	19	58	−39	20	Qualification to Relegation group

Source: Russian Premier League
Rules for classification: 1) points; 2) number of wins; 3) head-to-head points; 4) number of head-to-head wins; 5) head-to-head goal difference; 6) number of head-to-head goals scored; 7) number of head-to-head away goals scored; 8) goal difference; 9) number of goals scored; 10) number of away goals scored.

=== Russian Premier League – relegation group ===
==== Results by round ====
Round	1	2	3	4	5	6	7	8	9	10	11	12	13	14
Ground	A	H	A	H	A	H	A	A	H	A	H	A	H	H
Result	L	D	L	W	D	D	W	L	W	L	D	L	D	W
Position	16	16	16	16	16	16	15	15	15	15	15	15	15	15

Updated to match(es) played on 8 November 2011. Source: Russian Premier League
A = Away; H = Home; W = Win; D = Draw; L = Loss

==== Matches ====
20 November 2011 31	Rostov	3–1	Tom Tomsk	Rostov-on-Don
21:30 OMSST (UTC+7)	Adamov 56' (pen.), 88'; Papadopulos 70'	Summary	Kanunnikov 22' (pen.); Stroyev (red card) 15'; Nikitinsky (yellow card) 34' (yellow-red card) 53'	Stadium: Olimp – 2 Attendance: 4,002; Referee: Igor Fedotov

27 November 2011 32	Tom Tomsk	0–0	Krasnodar	Tomsk
15:00 OMSST (UTC+7)		Summary		Stadium: Trud Stadium; Attendance: 7,500; Referee: Eduard Malyi

3 March 2012 33	Terek Grozny	1–0	Tom Tomsk	Grozny
17:00 OMSST (UTC+7)	Asildarov 62'	Summary		Stadium: Sultan Bilimkhanov Stadium; Attendance: 8,900; Referee: Alexsey Nikolaev

9 March 2012 34	Tom Tomsk	1–0	Volga	Tomsk
17:00 OMSST (UTC+7)	Boyarintsev 41'	Summary		Stadium: Trud Stadium; Attendance: 7,500; Referee: Aleksey Eskov

17 March 2012 35	Amkar Perm	0–0	Tom Tomsk	Perm
15:00 OMSST (UTC+7)		Summary		Stadium: Zvezda Stadium; Attendance: 7,800; Referee: Aleksandr Egorov

24 March 2012 36	Tom Tomsk	0–0	Krylia Sovetov	Tomsk
17:00 OMSST (UTC+7)		Summary		Stadium: Trud Stadium; Attendance: 7,500; Referee: Vladimir Kazmenko

29 March 2012 37	Spartak Nalchik	0–2	Tom Tomsk	Nalchik
19:30 OMSST (UTC+7)		Summary	Gatagov 16'; Ropotan 57'	Stadium: Spartak Stadium; Attendance: 3,500; Referee: Sergey Lapochkin

8 April 2012 38	Krasnodar	3–1	Tom Tomsk	Krasnodar
19:30 OMSST (UTC+7)	Golyshev 45'; Martsvaladze 76'; Joãozinho 82'	Summary	Rebko 68' (pen.)	Stadium: Kuban Stadium; Attendance: 4,200; Referee: Sergey Kuznetsov

14 April 2012 39	Tom Tomsk	3–0	Terek Grozny	Tomsk
17:00 OMSST (UTC+7)	Nakhushev 45+1'; Gultyayev 68'; Boyarintsev 84'	Summary		Stadium: Trud Stadium; Attendance: 8,000; Referee: Vladislav Bezborodov

20 April 2012 40	Volga	2–0	Tom Tomsk	Nizhny Novgorod
17:15 OMSST (UTC+7)	Karyaka 22' (pen.); Bibilov 90+2' (pen.)	Summary	Klimov (yellow card) 43' (red card) 90'; Ivanov (yellow card) 33' (red card) 90'	Stadium: Lokomotiv Stadium; Attendance: 5,300; Referee: Sergey Lapochkin

27 April 2012 41	Tom Tomsk	0–0	Amkar Perm	Tomsk
18:00 OMSST (UTC+7)		Summary		Stadium: Trud Stadium; Attendance: 6,000; Referee: Stanislav Sukhina

3 May 2012 42	Krylia Sovetov	1–0	Tom Tomsk	Samara
22:00 OMSST (UTC+7)	Bober 6'	Summary	Boyarintsev (yellow card) 77' (yellow-red card) 79'	Stadium: Metallurg Stadium; Attendance: 18,000; Referee: Evgeny Turbin

7 May 2012 43	Tom Tomsk	1–1	Spartak Nalchik	Tomsk
14:00 OMSST (UTC+7)	Balyaikin 42'	Summary	Rukhaia 14'	Stadium: Trud Stadium; Attendance: 4,000; Referee: Vasiliy Kazartsev

12 May 2012 44	Tom Tomsk	2–1	Rostov	Tomsk
18:30 OMSST (UTC+7)	Khazov 58'; Rebko 90+3' (pen.)	Summary	Kirichenko 85'	Stadium: Trud Stadium; Attendance: 9,000; Referee: Timur Arslanbekov

==== League table ====
Pos	Team	Pld	W	D	L	GF	GA	GD	Pts	Qualification or relegation
9	Krasnodar	44	16	13	15	58	61	−3	61	
10	Amkar Perm	44	14	13	17	40	51	−11	55	
11	Terek Grozny	44	14	10	20	45	62	−17	52	
12	Krylia Sovetov Samara	44	12	15	17	33	50	−17	51	
13	Rostov (O)	44	12	12	20	45	61	−16	48	Qualification to Relegation play-offs
14	Volga Nizhny Novgorod (O)	44	12	5	27	37	60	−23	41	Qualification to Relegation play-offs
15	Tom Tomsk (R)	44	8	13	23	30	70	−40	37	Relegation to Football National League
16	Spartak Nalchik (R)	44	7	13	24	39	60	−21	34	Relegation to Football National League

Source: Russian Premier League
Rules for classification: 1) points; 2) number of wins; 3) head-to-head points; 4) number of head-to-head wins; 5) head-to-head goal difference; 6) number of head-to-head goals scored; 7) number of head-to-head away goals scored; 8) goal difference; 9) number of goals scored; 10) number of away goals scored
(O) Play-off winners; (R) Relegated

=== Russian Cup ===
17 July 2011 Round of 32	Metallurg-Oskol Stary Oskol	0–1	Tom Tomsk	Stary Oskol
20:00 OMSST (UTC+7)		Report	Kovalchuk 25'	Stadium: PromAgro Stadium; Attendance: 5,200; Referee: Timur Arslanbekov

21 September 2011 Round of 16	FC Rostov	3–1	Tom Tomsk	Rostov-on-Don
22:00 OMSST (UTC+7)	Saláta 22'; Bracamonte 42'; Grigoryev 81'	Report	Savin 48'	Stadium: Olimp – 2 Attendance: 6,500; Referee: Vladimir Rogulyov

== Squad statistics ==
=== Appearances and goals ===
No.	Pos	Nat	Player	Total		Premier League		Russian Cup	
No.	Pos	Nat	Player	Apps	Goals	Apps	Goals	Apps	Goals
1	GK	(Russia) RUS	Aleksei Botvinyev	7	0	6+0	0	1+0	0
3	MF	(Russia) RUS	Valeri Klimov	15	0	2+12	0	1+0	0
4	DF	(Belarus) BLR	Sergey Sosnovski	24	0	17+5	0	1+1	0
5	DF	(Belarus) BLR	Syarhey Amelyanchuk	11	0	11+0	0	0+0	0
7	MF	(Russia) RUS	Aleksei Rebko	11	2	11+0	2	0+0	0
8	MF	(Russia) RUS	Dmitri Malyaka	4	0	1+3	0	0+0	0
9	FW	(Russia) RUS	Igor Portnyagin	8	0	8+0	0	0+0	0
11	DF	(Russia) RUS	Alan Gatagov	5	1	5+0	1	0+0	0
13	DF	(Russia) RUS	Ilya Gultyayev	39	1	28+9	1	2+0	0
15	DF	(Russia) RUS	Ruslan Nakhushev	17	1	14+2	1	1+0	0
17	DF	(Russia) RUS	Andrei Ivanov	2	0	2+0	0	0+0	0
18	GK	(Czech Republic) CZE	Petr Vašek	12	0	12+0	0	0+0	0
20	MF	(Belarus) BLR	Yan Tsiharow	12	0	12+0	0	0+0	0
21	MF	(Russia) RUS	Denis Boyarintsev	24	2	21+2	2	1+0	0
22	DF	(Bulgaria) BUL	Plamen Nikolov	10	0	10+0	0	0+0	0
23	MF	(Russia) RUS	Yevgeni Balyaikin	30	1	27+2	1	1+0	0
24	DF	(Russia) RUS	Dmitri Smirnov	17	1	12+3	1	2+0	0
25	FW	(Russia) RUS	Anton Khazov	11	1	10+1	1	0+0	0
26	DF	(Russia) RUS	Viktor Stroyev	25	1	19+5	1	1+0	0
32	FW	(Russia) RUS	Nikita Bazhenov	27	0	15+11	0	0+1	0
47	MF	(Russia) RUS	Aleksei Sazonov	5	0	0+5	0	0+0	0
62	MF	(Russia) RUS	Dmitri Nikitinsky	7	0	4+3	0	0+0	0
67	MF	(Russia) RUS	Emin Makhmudov	8	0	6+2	0	0+0	0
78	FW	(Russia) RUS	Kirill Pogrebnyak	14	0	5+8	0	0+1	0
79	DF	(Russia) RUS	Yaroslav Ovsyannikov	1	0	0+1	0	0+0	0
80	MF	(Russia) RUS	Yevgeni Chernov	1	0	0+1	0	0+0	0
86	MF	(Romania) ROU	Adrian Ropotan	19	1	18+0	1	1+0	0
91	DF	(Russia) RUS	Denis Voronov	2	0	2+0	0	0+0	0
93	DF	(Russia) RUS	Mikhail Bashilov	1	0	1+0	0	0+0	0
Players away from the club on loan:
11	MF	(Ukraine) UKR	Kyrylo Kovalchuk	15	1	6+8	0	1+0	1
Players who appeared for Tom Tomsk that left during the season:
5	MF	(Russia) RUS	Sergei Skoblyakov	28	1	22+5	1	1+0	0
7	FW	(United States) USA	Eugene Starikov	23	1	12+9	1	1+1	0
9	FW	(Russia) RUS	Denis Laktionov	1	0	0+1	0	0+0	0
10	FW	(Russia) RUS	Yevgeny Savin	11	1	6+4	0	1+0	1
17	MF	(Russia) RUS	Pavel Golyshev	27	8	23+2	8	2+0	0
18	DF	(Russia) RUS	Vladislav Khatazhyonkov	11	0	4+6	0	0+1	0
22	DF	(Romania) ROU	Ovidiu Dănănae	4	0	4+0	0	0+0	0
30	GK	(Russia) RUS	Sergei Pesyakov	27	0	26+0	0	1+0	0
34	MF	(Russia) RUS	Renat Sabitov	28	0	27+0	0	1+0	0
37	DF	(Serbia) SRB	Đorđe Jokić	22	2	22+0	2	0+0	0
55	MF	(South Korea) KOR	Kim Nam-Il	17	0	15+2	0	0+0	0
83	MF	(Russia) RUS	Aleksandr Kharitonov	25	0	15+9	0	0+1	0
99	FW	(Russia) RUS	Maksim Kanunnikov	30	5	23+5	5	2+0	0

=== Top scorers ===
Place	Position	Nation	Number	Name	Championship	Russian Cup	Total
1	FW	(Russia)	17	Pavel Golyshev	8	0	8
2	FW	(Russia)	99	Maksim Kanunnikov	4	0	4
3	DF	(Serbia)	37	Đorđe Jokić	2	0	2
3	MF	(Russia)	21	Denis Boyarintsev	2	0	2
3	MF	(Russia)	7	Aleksei Rebko	2	0	2
6	FW	(United States)	7	Eugene Starikov	1	0	1
6	MF	(Russia)	5	Sergei Skoblyakov	1	0	1
6				Own goal	1	0	1
6	DF	(Russia)	24	Dmitri Smirnov	1	0	1
6	DF	(Russia)	26	Viktor Stroyev	1	0	1
6	MF	(Russia)	11	Alan Gatagov	1	0	1
6	DF	(Russia)	13	Ilya Gultyayev	1	0	1
6	DF	(Russia)	15	Ruslan Nakhushev	1	0	1
6	MF	(Romania)	86	Adrian Ropotan	1	0	1
6	MF	(Russia)	23	Yevgeni Balyaikin	1	0	1
6	FW	(Russia)	25	Anton Khazov	1	0	1
6	FW	(Russia)	10	Yevgeny Savin	0	1	1
6	MF	(Ukraine)	11	Kyrylo Kovalchuk	0	1	1
				TOTALS	28	2	30

=== Disciplinary record ===
Number	Nation	Position	Name	Russian Premier League		Russian Cup		Total	
Number	Nation	Position	Name	Yellow card	Red card	Yellow card	Red card	Yellow card	Red card
3	(Russia)	MF	Valeri Klimov	2	1	1	0	3	1
4	(Belarus)	DF	Sergey Sosnovski	0	0	1	0	1	0
5	(Russia)	MF	Sergei Skoblyakov	1	0	0	0	1	0
7	(Russia)	MF	Aleksei Rebko	2	0	0	0	2	0
8	(Russia)	MF	Dmitri Malyaka	1	0	0	0	1	0
11	(Ukraine)	FW	Kyrylo Kovalchuk	0	0	1	0	1	0
13	(Russia)	DF	Ilya Gultyayev	1	0	0	0	1	0
15	(Russia)	DF	Ruslan Nakhushev	3	0	0	0	3	0
17	(Russia)	MF	Pavel Golyshev	3	1	1	0	4	1
18	(Russia)	DF	Vladislav Khatazhyonkov	1	0	0	0	1	0
21	(Russia)	MF	Denis Boyarintsev	5	1	0	0	5	1
22	(Bulgaria)	DF	Plamen Nikolov	2	0	0	0	2	0
23	(Russia)	MF	Yevgeni Balyaikin	1	0	0	0	1	0
24	(Russia)	DF	Dmitri Smirnov	2	0	0	0	2	0
25	(Russia)	FW	Anton Khazov	1	0	0	0	1	0
26	(Russia)	DF	Viktor Stroyev	4	1	1	0	5	1
34	(Russia)	MF	Renat Sabitov	1	0	0	0	1	0
62	(Russia)	MF	Dmitri Nikitinsky	2	1	0	0	2	1
67	(Russia)	MF	Emin Makhmudov	2	0	0	0	2	0
83	(Russia)	MF	Aleksandr Kharitonov	1	0	0	0	1	0
86	(Romania)	MF	Adrian Ropotan	2	0	0	0	2	0
99	(Russia)	FW	Maksim Kanunnikov	0	0	1	0	1	0
			TOTALS	38	5	6	0	44	5
