= Golyshev =

Golyshev (masculine, Russian: Голышев) or Golysheva (feminine, Russian: Голышева) is a Russian surname. Notable people with the surname include:

- Anatoly Golyshev (born 1995), Russian ice hockey player
- Dmitri Golyshev (born 1985), Russian soccer player, brother of Pavel
- Pavel Golyshev (born 1987), Russian soccer player, brother of Dimitri
- Viktor Golyshev (born 1937), English-to-Russian translator
- Yefim Golyshev (1897–1970), Ukrainian–born painter
