= Skoblyakov =

Skoblyakov (Russian: Скобляко́в) is a Russian surname. Notable people with the surname include:

- Dmitri Skoblyakov (born 1980), Russian footballer, brother of Sergei
- Sergei Skoblyakov (born 1977), Russian footballer
