= Denis Voronov =

Russian footballer

Personal information
- Full name: Denis Igorevich Voronov
- Date of birth: 2 June 1991 (age 35)
- Place of birth: Vladivostok, Soviet Union
- Height: 1.84 m (6 ft 0 in)
- Position: Centre back

Youth career
- –2008: FC Luch-Energiya Vladivostok
- 2009–2011: FC Tom Tomsk

Senior career*
Years	Team	Apps	(Gls)
2011–2013	FC Tom Tomsk	2	(0)
2013–2014	FC Khimki	16	(0)
2014	FC Yakutiya Yakutsk	4	(1)
2015	FC Vityaz Krymsk	8	(0)
- * Club domestic league appearances and goals

Denis Igorevich Voronov (Russian: Денис Игоревич Воронов; born 2 June 1991) is a Russian former football defender.

== Career ==
Voronov made his professional debut for FC Tom Tomsk on 2 October 2011 in the game against FC Rubin Kazan.
