= Vladimir Yurin =

Russian footballer and coach

Personal information
- Full name: Vladimir Ivanovich Yurin
- Date of birth: 18 May 1947
- Place of birth: Moscow, Russian SFSR
- Date of death: 15 March 2016 (aged 68)
- Place of death: Moscow, Russia
- Height: 1.73 m (5 ft 8 in)
- Position: Midfielder

Youth career
- 1958–1966: Torpedo Moscow

Senior career*
Years	Team	Apps	(Gls)
1966–1969	Baltika Kaliningrad	92	(8)
1970–1980	Torpedo Moscow	304	(24)

Managerial career
- 1981–1983: Torpedo Moscow (director)
- 1983: Torpedo Moscow (assistant)
- 1986–1989: Torpedo Moscow (assistant)
- 1993–1994: Lada Dimitrovgrad
- 1996–1999: Tom Tomsk
- 1999–2000: Arsenal Tula
- 2000–2001: Saturn Ramenskoye
- 2002: Gazovik-Gazprom Izhevsk
- 2004: SK Torpedo Moscow
- 2007–2016: Torpedo Moscow (academy)
- * Club domestic league appearances and goals

Vladimir Ivanovich Yurin (Russian: Владимир Иванович Юрин; 18 May 1947 – 15 March 2016) was a Russian professional football coach and player.

== Honours ==
- Soviet Top League champion: 1976 (autumn).
- Soviet Top League bronze: 1977.
