= Aleksandr Studzinsky =

Russian footballer

Personal information
- Full name: Aleksandr Gennadyevich Studzinsky
- Date of birth: 21 June 1976 (age 50)
- Place of birth: Horlivka, Ukrainian SSR
- Height: 1.78 m (5 ft 10 in)
- Position: Midfielder

Youth career
- SUOR Stavropol

Senior career*
Years	Team	Apps	(Gls)
1993	FC Nart Cherkessk	2	(0)
1994–1998	FC Dynamo Stavropol	103	(6)
1994–1997	→ FC Dynamo-d Stavropol	67	(15)
1999–2000	FC Torpedo-ZIL Moscow	34	(4)
2000	FC Kristall Smolensk	16	(10)
2001	FC Torpedo-ZIL Moscow	1	(0)
2001	FC Volgar-Gazprom Astrakhan	16	(1)
2002–2003	FC Tom Tomsk	65	(17)
2004	FC Kuban Krasnodar	3	(0)
2004–2005	FC Sodovik Sterlitamak	39	(6)
2006	FC Fakel Voronezh	15	(0)
2006	FC Spartak-MZhK Ryazan	11	(0)
2007	FC Dynamo Stavropol	8	(0)
2007–2008	FC Nistru Otaci	9	(2)
2008	FC Zhemchuzhina Sochi	24	(0)
2009	FC Stavropolye-2009	6	(2)
2009–2011	FC Kavkaztransgaz-2005 Ryzdvyany	52	(3)

Managerial career
- 2012: FC Kavkaztransgaz-2005 Ryzdvyany (administrator)
- 2012: FC Kavkaztransgaz-2005 Ryzdvyany (assistant)
- * Club domestic league appearances and goals

Aleksandr Gennadyevich Studzinsky (Russian: Александр Геннадьевич Студзинский; born 21 June 1976) is a former Russian professional footballer.

== Club career ==
He made his debut in the Russian Premier League in 2001 for FC Torpedo-ZIL Moscow.
