= Maksim Kanunnikov =

Russian footballer (born 1991)

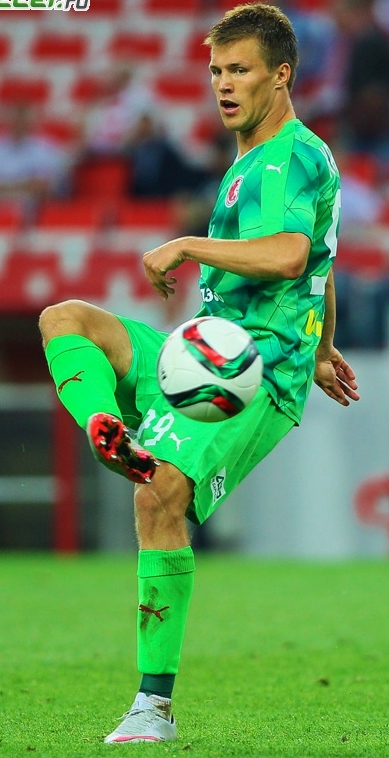
- Kanunnikov with Rubin Kazan in 2015

Personal information
- Full name: Maksim Sergeyevich Kanunnikov
- Date of birth: 14 July 1991 (age 35)
- Place of birth: Nizhny Tagil, Russian SFSR
- Height: 1.83 m (6 ft 0 in)
- Position: Forward

Youth career
- Uralets Nizhny Tagil
- Zenit Saint Petersburg

Senior career*
Years	Team	Apps	(Gls)
2009–2012	Zenit Saint Petersburg	32	(2)
2011	→ Tom Tomsk (loan)	28	(5)
2013–2014	Amkar Perm	35	(5)
2014–2018	Rubin Kazan	93	(18)
2018	SKA-Khabarovsk	9	(0)
2018–2022	Krylia Sovetov Samara	38	(6)

International career
2010	Russia U-19	6	(2)
2010–2013	Russia U-21	23	(3)
2014–2017	Russia	11	(0)
- * Club domestic league appearances and goals

Maksim Sergeyevich Kanunnikov (Russian: Максим Сергеевич Канунников; born 14 July 1991) is a Russian former football forward.

== Club career ==
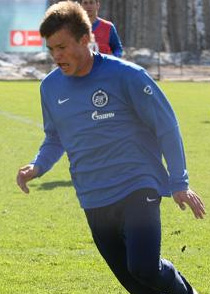
Kanunnikov training with Zenit in 2010

Kanunnikov joined Zenit U21s in 2009 and shortly after started to train with the first team, appearing on the bench on occasion. He finally made his Premier League debut on 23 August 2009, coming as a last-minute substitute against Lokomotiv Moscow. On 10 May 2010 his first goal in Russian Premier League was against Amkar Perm.

On 17 January 2011, Kanunnikov was on loan to Tom Tomsk for the 2011–12 season.

On 2 March 2018, he was released by mutual consent from his contract by Rubin Kazan.

On 7 March 2018, he signed with SKA-Khabarovsk until the end of the 2017–18 season.

On 27 July 2018, he signed a one-year contract with Krylia Sovetov Samara. He left Krylia Sovetov at the end of the 2021–22 season.

== International career ==
He made his debut for the Russia national football team on 26 May 2014 in a friendly game against Slovakia, replacing Alan Dzagoev at half time in a 1–0 win at Petrovsky Stadium.

On 2 June 2014, he was included in Russia's 2014 FIFA World Cup squad. He made his competitive debut for Russia in the second group game against Belgium on 22 June, playing the entire 90 minutes of the 1–0 defeat at the Maracanã.

== Career honours ==
Zenit St. Petersburg

- Russian Cup (1): 2010

== Career statistics ==
As of 21 May 2022

Club	Season	League			Cup		Continental		Total	
Club	Season	Division	Apps	Goals	Apps	Goals	Apps	Goals	Apps	Goals
Zenit Saint Petersburg	2009	RPL	1	0	0	0	0	0	1	0
Zenit Saint Petersburg	2010	RPL	12	1	2	1	7 (Note: Two appearances in the UEFA Champions League, five appearances in the UEFA Europa League)	0	21	2
Zenit Saint Petersburg	2011–12	RPL	10	0	0	0	1 (Note: Appearances in the UEFA Champions League)	0	11	0
Zenit Saint Petersburg	2012–13	RPL	9	1	2	0	3	0	14	1
Zenit Saint Petersburg	Total		32	2	4	1	11	0	47	3
Tom Tomsk (loan)	2011–12	RPL	28	5	2	0	–		30	5
Amkar Perm	2012–13	RPL	11	2	–		–		11	2
Amkar Perm	2013–14	RPL	24	3	0	0	–		24	3
Amkar Perm	Total		35	5	0	0	0	0	35	5
Rubin Kazan	2014–15	RPL	26	5	2	0	–		28	5
Rubin Kazan	2015–16	RPL	30	4	0	0	10 (Note: Appearances in the UEFA Europa League)	3	40	7
Rubin Kazan	2016–17	RPL	22	7	1	0	–		23	7
Rubin Kazan	2017–18	RPL	15	2	2	0	–		17	2
Rubin Kazan	Total		93	18	5	0	10	3	108	21
SKA-Khabarovsk	2017–18	RPL	9	0	–		–		9	0
Krylia Sovetov Samara	2018–19	RPL	20	5	2	0	–		22	5
Krylia Sovetov Samara	2019–20	RPL	15	1	1	0	–		16	1
Krylia Sovetov Samara	2020–21	FNL	3	0	0	0	–		3	0
Krylia Sovetov Samara	2021–22	RPL	0	0	0	0	–		0	0
Krylia Sovetov Samara	Total		38	6	3	0	0	0	41	6
Career total			235	36	14	1	21	3	270	40
