= Mikhail Gaydamak =

Russian footballer

Personal information
- Full name: Mikhail Dmitriyevich Gaydamak
- Date of birth: 21 November 1996 (age 29)
- Place of birth: Novosibirsk, Russia
- Height: 1.73 m (5 ft 8 in)
- Position: Midfielder

Youth career
- –2013: Sibir Novosibirsk
- 2013–2014: Tom Tomsk

Senior career*
Years	Team	Apps	(Gls)
2013–2014	Tom Tomsk	0	(0)
2017–2018	FC Sibir-M Novosibirsk		
2018–2019	Sibir-2 Novosibirsk	20	(0)
2019	Volna Pinsk	12	(2)
2020–2021	Ocean Kerch	8	(0)
2021–2022	Chita	35	(1)
2022–2024	Torpedo Miass	55	(6)
2024	Astrakhan	8	(0)
- * Club domestic league appearances and goals as of 16 November 2024

Mikhail Dmitriyevich Gaydamak (Russian: Михаил Дмитриевич Гайдамак; born 21 November 1996) is a Russian football player.

== Club career ==
He made his debut in the Russian Professional Football League for FC Sibir-2 Novosibirsk on 7 August 2018 in a game against Sakhalin Yuzhno-Sakhalinsk.
