= Fyodor Burdykin =

Russian footballer

Personal information
- Full name: Fyodor Sergeyevich Burdykin
- Date of birth: 3 January 1990 (age 36)
- Height: 1.85 m (6 ft 1 in)
- Position: Goalkeeper

Youth career
- FC Rudgormash Voronezh
- FC Fakel Voronezh
- FC Dynamo Moscow

Senior career*
Years	Team	Apps	(Gls)
2007–2008	FC Dynamo Moscow	0	(0)
2009–2010	FC Tom Tomsk	0	(0)
2011	FC Torpedo Vladimir	4	(0)
2011–2013	FC Gazovik Orenburg	10	(0)
2013–2014	FC Tyumen	18	(0)
2014–2015	FC Khimki	29	(0)
2015–2016	FC Olimpik Novaya Usman		
- * Club domestic league appearances and goals

Fyodor Sergeyevich Burdykin (Russian: Фёдор Серге́евич Бурдыкин; born 3 January 1990) is a former Russian football goalkeeper.

== Club career ==
He played two seasons in the Russian Football National League for FC Torpedo Vladimir and FC Gazovik Orenburg.
