= Sergey Zhukov (footballer) =

Russian footballer

Sergei Zhukov
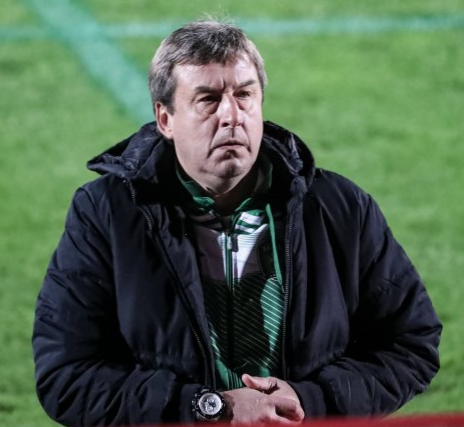

Personal information
- Full name: Sergei Nikolayevich Zhukov
- Date of birth: 8 May 1967 (age 59)
- Place of birth: Kazan, Russian SFSR
- Height: 1.84 m (6 ft 1/2 in)
- Position: Midfielder

Team information
- Current team: SKA-Khabarovsk (manager)

Youth career
- –1984: Rubin Kazan

Senior career*
Years	Team	Apps	(Gls)
1984–1985	Rubin Kazan	22	(2)
1986–1987	Iskra Smolensk	56	(5)
1988–1991	Torpedo Moscow	67	(1)
1992	Abahani Krira Chakra		
1993–1995	1. FSV Mainz 05	37	(2)
1995	Lokomotiv Moscow	1	(0)
1995	Lokomotiv-d Moscow	9	(3)
1996–1997	Tyumen	49	(7)
1997–2002	Tom Tomsk	162	(37)

Managerial career
- 2002–2004: Tom Tomsk (assistant)
- 2004: Moscow (scout)
- 2005: Saturn Ramenskoye (scout)
- 2005: Saturn Ramenskoye (deputy general director)
- 2014–2015: Saturn Ramenskoye (deputy general director)
- 2016: Arsenal Tula (assistant)
- 2017: Atyrau (sporting director)
- 2017–2018: Rotor Volgograd (assistant)
- 2019–2021: Saturn Ramenskoye
- 2021–2022: Tom Tomsk
- 2022–2023: Volga Ulyanovsk
- 2024: Academy FC Torpedo Moscow
- 2025–2026: Torpedo Moscow (U-21)
- 2025: Torpedo Moscow (caretaker)
- 2026–: SKA-Khabarovsk
- * Club domestic league appearances and goals

Sergei Nikolayevich Zhukov (Russian: Серге́й Николаевич Жуков; born 8 May 1967) is a Russian professional football coach and a former player who is the manager of SKA-Khabarovsk.

== Club career ==
He made his professional debut in the Soviet Second League in 1984 for Rubin Kazan.

== Honours ==
- Soviet Top League bronze: 1988, 1991.
- Russian Premier League runner-up: 1995.
- Soviet Cup finalist: 1988, 1989, 1991.
- Russian Cup winner: 1996 (played in the early stages of the 1995/96 tournament for Lokomotiv Moscow).
- Dhaka First Division League: 1992.

== European club competitions ==
With Torpedo Moscow.

- European Cup Winners' Cup 1989–90: 3 games.
- UEFA Cup 1990–91: 6 games, 1 goal.
