= Arbi Mezhiyev =

Russian footballer (born 1993)

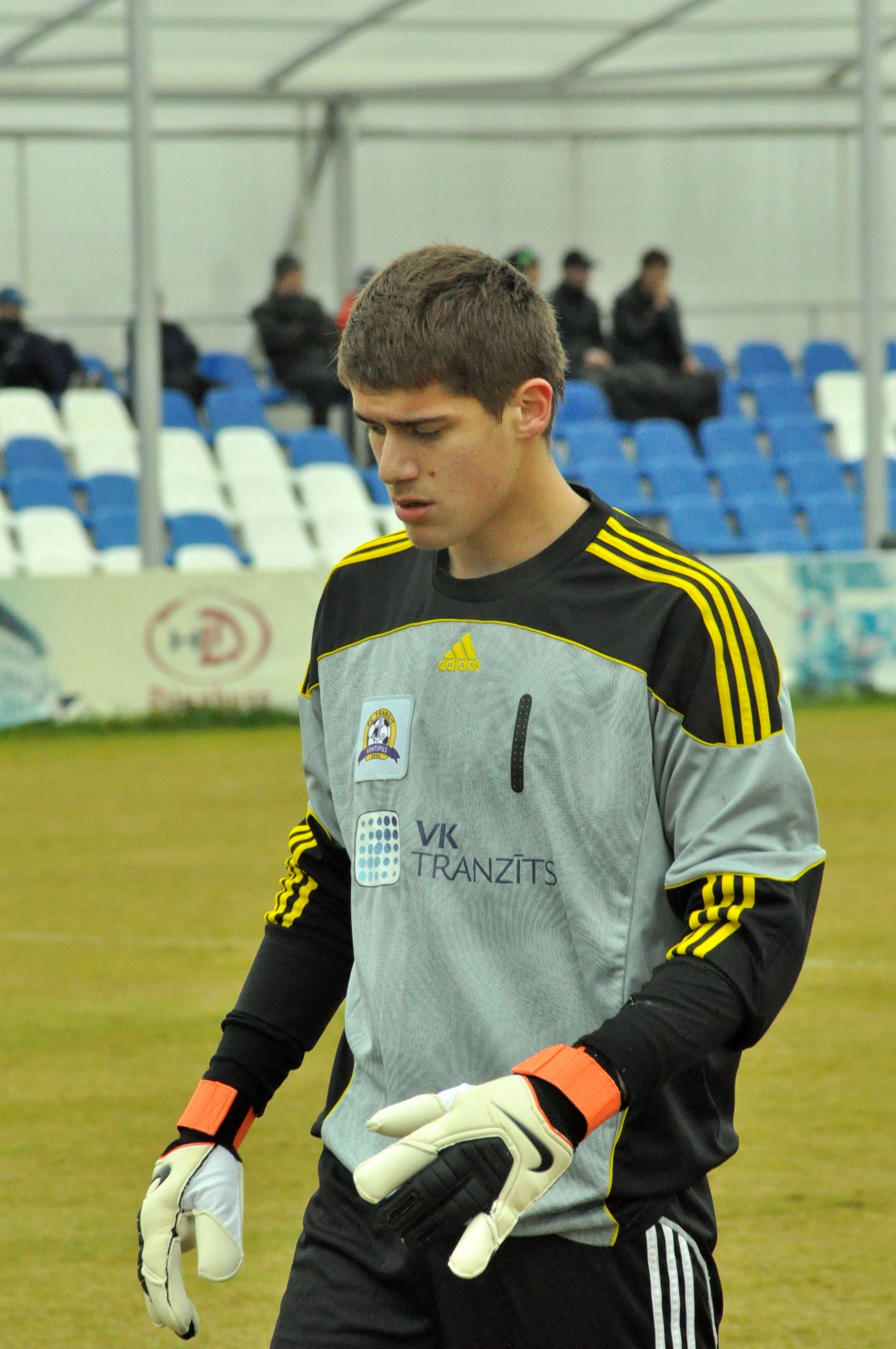
- Arbi Mezhiev in 2010

Personal information
- Full name: Arbi Lechayevich Mezhiyev
- Date of birth: 29 June 1993 (age 33)
- Place of birth: Moscow, Russia
- Height: 1.87 m (6 ft 2 in)
- Position: Goalkeeper

Youth career
- FC Lokomotiv Moscow

Senior career*
Years	Team	Apps	(Gls)
2010–2011	FC Tranzit	11	(0)
2011–2012	FK Ventspils	0	(0)
2012	FC Dynamo Stavropol	0	(0)
2012–2013	FC Terek Grozny	0	(0)
2014–2015	FC Tom Tomsk	2	(0)
2017–2018	SK Benešov		
2019	FC Zorky Krasnogorsk	1	(0)
2019–2021	FC Saturn Ramenskoye	38	(0)
2021–2022	FC Rodina Moscow	0	(0)
- * Club domestic league appearances and goals

Arbi Lechayevich Mezhiyev (Russian: Арби Лечаевич Межиев; born 29 June 1993) is a Russian former football player.

== Club career ==
He made his professional debut in the Russian Football National League for FC Tom Tomsk on 24 August 2014 in a game against FC Sakhalin Yuzhno-Sakhalinsk.
