= Sergei Pesyakov =

Russian footballer (born 1988)

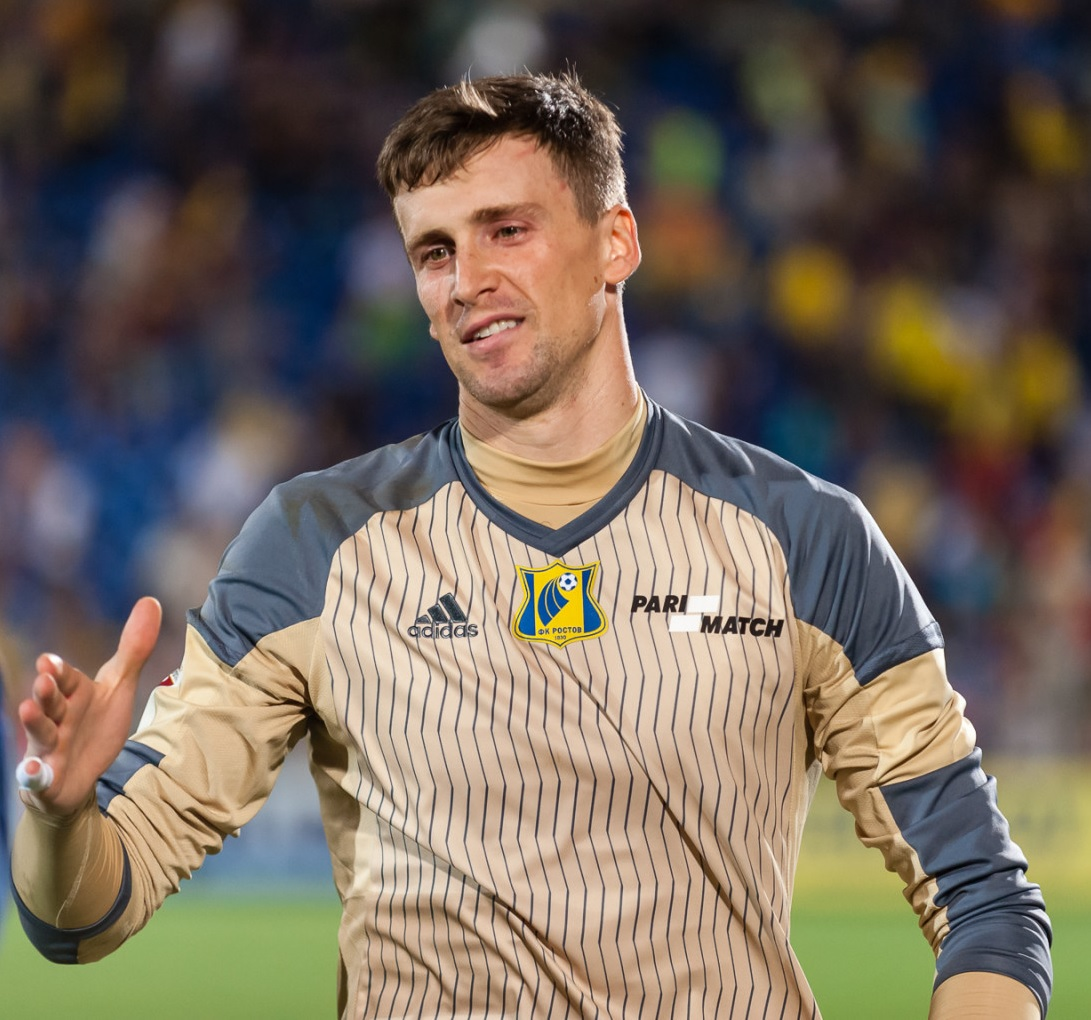
- Pesyakov with Rostov in 2017

Personal information
- Full name: Sergei Aleksandrovich Pesyakov
- Date of birth: 16 December 1988 (age 37)
- Place of birth: Ivanovo, USSR
- Height: 1.99 m (6 ft 6 in)
- Position: Goalkeeper

Team information
- Current team: Krylia Sovetov Samara
- Number: 30

Youth career
- 1997–2005: Burevestnik Ivanovo

Senior career*
Years	Team	Apps	(Gls)
2005–2009	Shinnik Yaroslavl	24	(0)
2007	→ Tekstilshchik-Telekom Ivanovo (loan)	13	(0)
2009–2017	Spartak Moscow	36	(0)
2011	→ Tom Tomsk (loan)	26	(0)
2012	→ Rostov (loan)	0	(0)
2014–2015	→ Spartak-2 Moscow	16	(0)
2015	→ Anzhi Makhachkala (loan)	11	(0)
2016–2017	→ Spartak-2 Moscow	18	(0)
2017–2024	Rostov	158	(0)
2024–	Krylia Sovetov Samara	56	(0)

International career^{‡}
2007	Russia U-19	8	(0)
2009–2010	Russia U-21	14	(0)
2011–2012	Russia-2	2	(0)
2022–	Russia	2	(0)
- * Club domestic league appearances and goals as of 5 September 2026 ‡ National team caps and goals as of 26 March 2023

Sergei Aleksandrovich Pesyakov (Russian: Серге́й Александрович Песьяков; born 16 December 1988) is a Russian football goalkeeper who plays for Krylia Sovetov Samara.

== Career ==
=== Club ===
Pesyakov made his professional debut for Spartak Moscow on 13 July 2010 in the Russian Cup game against FC Metallurg Lipetsk. He played in all Spartak Moscow's 2012–13 UEFA Champions League matches, conceding Kris Commons's penalty in the 2-1 loss against Celtic at Parkhead.

Pesyakov moved on a season-long loan to Anzhi Makhachkala on 12 August 2015. Anzhi terminated the loan early on 29 December 2015.

On 9 June 2017, he signed a 2-year contract with Rostov.

On 27 May 2024, Pesyakov signed with Krylia Sovetov Samara. On 9 June 2026, Pesyakov extended his contract with Krylia Sovetov for two more seasons.

=== International ===
Pesyakov was a part of the Russia U-21 side that was competing in the 2011 European Under-21 Championship qualification.

He was first called up to Russia national football team for UEFA Euro 2020 qualifying matches against San Marino and Cyprus in June 2019. He made his debut in a friendly against Tajikistan on 17 November 2022.

== Career statistics ==
=== Club ===
As of match played 5 September 2026

Appearances and goals by club, season and competition
Club	Season	League			Cup		Europe		Total	
Club	Season	Division	Apps	Goals	Apps	Goals	Apps	Goals	Apps	Goals
Shinnik Yaroslavl	2006	Russian Premier League	2	0	0	0	–		2	0
Shinnik Yaroslavl	2008	Russian Premier League	13	0	0	0	–		13	0
Shinnik Yaroslavl	2009	Russian First League	9	0	0	0	–		9	0
Shinnik Yaroslavl	Total		24	0	0	0	0	0	24	0
Tekstilshchik-Telekom (loan)	2007	Russian First League	13	0	0	0	–		13	0
Spartak Moscow	2008	Russian Premier League	0	0	0	0	0	0	0	0
Spartak Moscow	2009	Russian Premier League	0	0	0	0	–		0	0
Spartak Moscow	2010	Russian Premier League	5	0	1	0	0	0	6	0
Spartak Moscow	2012–13	Russian Premier League	8	0	1	0	2 (Note: Appearances in the UEFA Champions League)	0	11	0
Spartak Moscow	2013–14	Russian Premier League	15	0	0	0	2 (Note: Appearances in the UEFA Europa League)	0	17	0
Spartak Moscow	2014–15	Russian Premier League	1	0	1	0	–		2	0
Spartak Moscow	2015–16	Russian Premier League	6	0	–		–		6	0
Spartak Moscow	2016–17	Russian Premier League	1	0	1	0	0	0	2	0
Spartak Moscow	Total		36	0	4	0	4	0	44	0
Tom Tomsk (loan)	2011–12	Russian Premier League	26	0	1	0	–		27	0
Rostov (loan)	2011–12	Russian Premier League	0	0	2	0	–		2	0
Spartak-2 Moscow	2014–15	Russian Second League	16	0	–		–		16	0
Spartak-2 Moscow	2015–16	Russian First League	11	0	–		–		11	0
Spartak-2 Moscow	2016–17	Russian First League	7	0	–		–		7	0
Spartak-2 Moscow	Total		34	0	0	0	0	0	34	0
Anzhi Makhachkala (loan)	2015–16	Russian Premier League	11	0	1	0	–		12	0
Rostov	2017–18	Russian Premier League	18	0	2	0	–		20	0
Rostov	2018–19	Russian Premier League	19	0	6	0	–		25	0
Rostov	2019–20	Russian Premier League	17	0	2	0	–		19	0
Rostov	2020–21	Russian Premier League	24	0	1	0	1	0	26	0
Rostov	2021–22	Russian Premier League	27	0	0	0	–		27	0
Rostov	2022–23	Russian Premier League	30	0	8	0	–		38	0
Rostov	2023–24	Russian Premier League	23	0	2	0	–		25	0
Rostov	Total		158	0	21	0	1	0	180	0
Krylya Sovetov Samara	2024–25	Russian Premier League	19	0	1	0	—		20	0
Krylya Sovetov Samara	2025–26	Russian Premier League	30	0	0	0	—		30	0
Krylya Sovetov Samara	2026–27	Russian Premier League	7	0	0	0	—		7	0
Krylya Sovetov Samara	Total		56	0	1	0	0	0	57	0
Career total			358	0	30	0	5	0	393	0

=== International ===
As of match played 26 March 2023

Appearances and goals by national team and year
National team	Year	Apps	Goals
Russia	2022	1	0
Russia	2023	1	0
Total		2	0

== Honours ==
Spartak Moscow

- Russian Premier League: 2016–17
