= Vladimir Pomeshchikov =

Russian footballer and coach

Vladimir Pomeshchikov Владимир Помещиков
Personal information
- Full name: Vladimir Vasilyevich Pomeshchikov
- Date of birth: 27 December 1956 (age 69)
- Position: Midfielder

Senior career*
Years	Team	Apps	(Gls)
1975–1978	Torpedo Tomsk	116	(15)
1978–1979	Kuzbass Kemerovo	27	(3)
1979–1991	Tom Tomsk	276	(22)

Managerial career
- 1988–1991: Tom Tomsk (assistant)
- 1992–1995: Tom Tomsk
- 1996–2020: Tom Tomsk (assistant)
- 2001: Tom Tomsk (caretaker)
- 2020–2022: Tom Tomsk (youth)
- * Club domestic league appearances and goals

Vladimir Vasilyevich Pomeshchikov (Russian: Владимир Васильевич Помещиков; born 27 December 1956) is a Russian professional football coach and a former player.
