= Viktor Sebelev =

Russian footballer and manager

Personal information
- Full name: Viktor Yevgenyevich Sebelev
- Date of birth: 11 March 1972 (age 54)
- Place of birth: Grozny, Russian SFSR
- Height: 1.64 m (5 ft 4 1/2 in)
- Positions: Forward; midfielder

Senior career*
Years	Team	Apps	(Gls)
1989–2003	FC Tom Tomsk	374	(79)
2003	FC Sodovik Sterlitamak	16	(8)
2004	FC Tom Tomsk	12	(0)
2004	FC Lukoil Chelyabinsk	17	(5)
2005	FC Chkalovets-1936 Novosibirsk	28	(1)
2006	FC Ryazan-Agrokomplekt Ryazan	32	(8)
Total		479	(101)

Managerial career
- 2007–2008: FC Tom Tomsk (assistant)
- 2008–2011: FC Tom Tomsk (reserves)
- 2011–2013: FC Tom Tomsk (assistant)
- 2013–2014: FC Tom Tomsk (reserves)
- 2014–2016: FC Tom-2 Tomsk
- 2016–2017: FC Tom Tomsk (U21)
- 2017–2018: FC Raspadskaya Mezhdurechensk
- 2020: FC Tom Tomsk (assistant)
- 2020: FC Tom Tomsk (caretaker)
- 2020–2021: FC Tom Tomsk (assistant)
- * Club domestic league appearances and goals

Viktor Yevgenyevich Sebelev (Russian: Виктор Евгеньевич Себелев; born 11 March 1972) is a Russian football manager and a former player.

== Club career ==
He played 10 seasons in the Russian Football National League for FC Tom Tomsk and FC Chkalovets-1936 Novosibirsk.
