= Ruslan Akhidzhak =

Russian footballer and coach

Personal information
- Full name: Ruslan Bayzetovich Akhidzhak
- Date of birth: 8 March 1975 (age 51)
- Place of birth: Tomsk, Russian SFSR
- Height: 1.82 m (5 ft 11 1/2 in)
- Positions: Midfielder; forward

Senior career*
Years	Team	Apps	(Gls)
1992–1994	FC Tom Tomsk	37	(18)
1995	FC Zarya Leninsk-Kuznetsky	0	(0)
1995–1999	FC Tom Tomsk	125	(32)
2000	FC Torpedo-Viktoriya Nizhny Novgorod	6	(1)
2000	FC Fabus Bronnitsy	16	(0)
2001	PFC Spartak Nalchik	0	(0)
2003	FC Zhetysu	3	(1)
2003	FC Metallurg Krasnoyarsk	8	(0)
2006	FC Chkalovets Novosibirsk	31	(2)
Total		226	(54)
- * Club domestic league appearances and goals

Ruslan Bayzetovich Akhidzhak (Russian: Руслан Байзетович Ахиджак; born 8 March 1975) is a Russian professional football coach and a former player. He is coaching amateur teams.

== Club career ==
He played 4 seasons in the Russian Football National League for FC Tom Tomsk.

== Honours ==
- Russian Second Division Zone Siberia top scorer: 1994 (18 goals).
