= Dmitri Skoblyakov =

Russian footballer

Personal information
- Full name: Dmitri Leonidovich Skoblyakov
- Date of birth: January 28, 1980 (age 46)
- Height: 1.78 m (5 ft 10 in)
- Positions: Midfielder; forward

Team information
- Current team: FC Sibir Novosibirsk (administrator)

Senior career*
Years	Team	Apps	(Gls)
1998–1999	FC Torpedo-2 Moscow	55	(7)
1999	FC Shinnik Yaroslavl (loan)	8	(0)
2000	FC Torpedo-2 Moscow	16	(6)
2000	FC Lokomotiv Nizhny Novgorod (loan)	13	(2)
2001	FC Torpedo Moscow	5	(0)
2002–2005	FC Tom Tomsk	33	(5)
2005–2006	FC Spartak Nizhny Novgorod	53	(8)
2007	FK Rīga	28	(3)
2008	FC Sibir Novosibirsk	28	(5)

Managerial career
- 2010–: FC Sibir Novosibirsk (administrator)
- * Club domestic league appearances and goals as of 1 January 2009

Dmitri Leonidovich Skoblyakov (Russian: Дмитрий Леонидович Скобляков; born January 28, 1980) is a retired Russian professional footballer.

Skoblyakov played in the Russian Premier League with FC Torpedo Moscow, FC Shinnik Yaroslavl and FC Tom Tomsk.

His brother Sergei Skoblyakov is also a professional footballer.
