= Valeri Sorokin (footballer, born 1985) =

Russian footballer

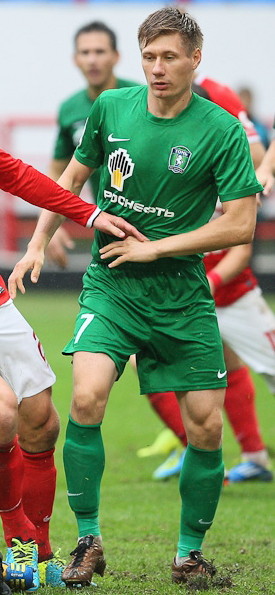

Personal information
- Full name: Valeri Yevgenyevich Sorokin
- Date of birth: 6 January 1985 (age 41)
- Place of birth: Stavropol, Soviet Union
- Height: 1.78 m (5 ft 10 in)
- Position: Midfielder

Youth career
- FC Dynamo Stavropol
- FC Spartak Moscow
- FC Lokomotiv Moscow

Senior career*
Years	Team	Apps	(Gls)
2005–2007	FC Dynamo Moscow	2	(0)
2006	→ FC Spartak Nizhny Novgorod (loan)	19	(0)
2008	FC Brussels	15	(1)
2008–2009	K.A.A. Gent	4	(0)
2009	→ A.F.C. Tubize (loan)	12	(3)
2010–2012	FC Dynamo Bryansk	77	(14)
2012–2015	FC Tom Tomsk	72	(13)
2015	FC SKA-Energiya Khabarovsk	11	(0)
2016	FC Solyaris Moscow	6	(1)
2016–2017	FC Tambov	26	(1)
2017–2018	FC Zorky Krasnogorsk	20	(2)

International career
2001–2002	Russia U-17	21	(7)
2004	Russia U-19	11	(4)
2005	Russia U-20	9	(2)
- * Club domestic league appearances and goals

Valeri Yevgenyevich Sorokin (Russian: Валерий Евгеньевич Сорокин; born 6 January 1985) is a Russian former football player.

== Club career ==
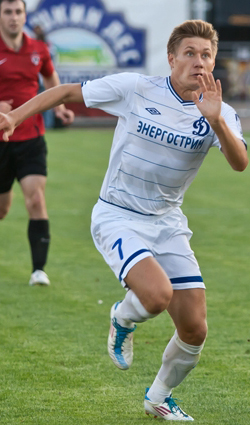
Valeri Sorokin in FC Dynamo Bryansk

Sorokin previously played for FC Dynamo Moscow, FC Spartak Nizhny Novgorod and FC Dynamo Bryansk.
