= Dmitri Nikitinsky =

Russian footballer

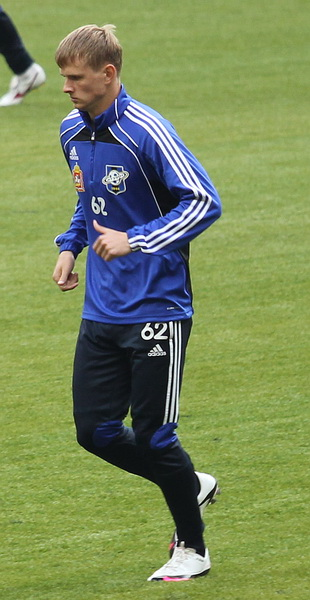

Personal information
- Full name: Dmitri Vladimirovich Nikitinsky
- Date of birth: 9 February 1992 (age 34)
- Place of birth: Volokolamsk, Russia
- Height: 1.80 m (5 ft 11 in)
- Position: Left back

Senior career*
Years	Team	Apps	(Gls)
2009–2010	FC Saturn Moscow Oblast	0	(0)
2011–2014	Tom Tomsk	17	(0)
2013	→ FC Tambov (loan)	6	(0)
2015	FC Arsenal-2 Tula	8	(0)
2015–2017	FC Shinnik Yaroslavl	22	(0)
2017	FC Zenit Penza	16	(0)
2018–2019	FC Saturn Ramenskoye	23	(2)
2019–2020	FC Zenit-Izhevsk	4	(0)
2021–2022	FC Balashikha (amateur)		
2022–2023	FC Balashikha	10	(0)

International career
2010	Russia U-18	6	(0)
2010	Russia U-19	7	(0)
2012	Russia U-20	2	(0)
2013	Russia U-21	3	(0)
- * Club domestic league appearances and goals

Dmitri Vladimirovich Nikitinsky (Russian: Дмитрий Владимирович Никитинский; born 9 February 1992) is a Russian former football player.

== Career ==
Nikitinsky made his professional debut for Saturn on 15 July 2009 in the Russian Cup game against FC Luch-Energiya Vladivostok.

He made his Russian Premier League debut for FC Tom Tomsk on 27 May 2011 in a game against FC Rubin Kazan.
