= Viktor Stroyev =

Russian footballer

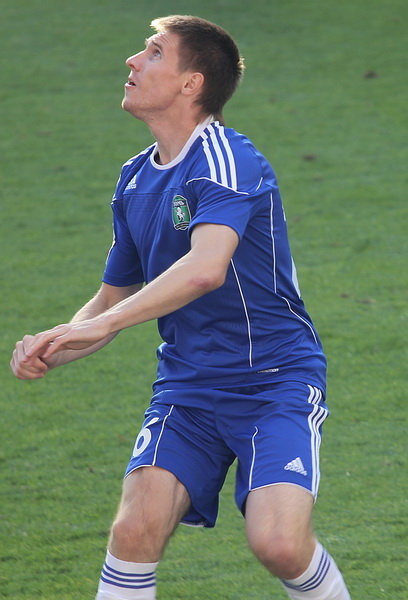

Personal information
- Full name: Viktor Viktorovich Stroyev
- Date of birth: 16 January 1987 (age 39)
- Place of birth: Voronezh, Russian SFSR
- Height: 1.78 m (5 ft 10 in)
- Position: Defender

Youth career
- –2004: FC Akademika Moscow
- 2004–2006: FC Zenit St. Petersburg

Senior career*
Years	Team	Apps	(Gls)
2007–2013	FC Tom Tomsk	64	(1)
2013–2015	FC Fakel Voronezh	43	(1)

International career
2005	Russia U-19	3	(0)
2008	Russia U-21	1	(0)
- * Club domestic league appearances and goals

Viktor Viktorovich Stroyev (Russian: Виктор Викторович Строев, born 16 January 1987) is a Russian former footballer.

== Career statistics ==
As of 11 March 2012

Club	Div	Season	League		Cup		Europe		Total	
Club	Div	Season	Apps	Goals	Apps	Goals	Apps	Goals	Apps	Goals
(Russia) Tom Tomsk	D1	2007	9	0	4	0	—		13	0
(Russia) Tom Tomsk	D1	2008	5	0	2	0	—		7	0
(Russia) Tom Tomsk	D1	2009	10	0	0	0	—		10	0
(Russia) Tom Tomsk	D1	2010	8	0	1	0	—		9	0
(Russia) Tom Tomsk	D1	2011-12	16	1	1	0	—		17	1
(Russia) Tom Tomsk	Total		48	1	8	0	0	0	56	1
Career total			48	1	8	0	0	0	56	1
