= Petr Vašek =

Czech footballer (born 1979)

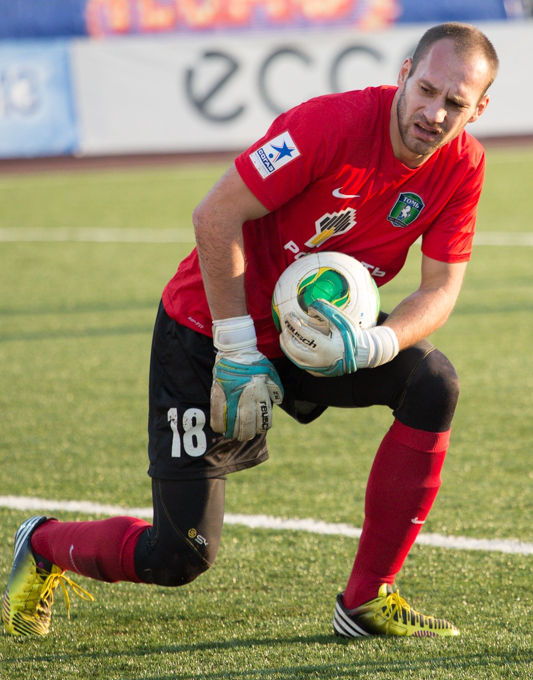

Personal information
- Date of birth: 9 April 1979 (age 47)
- Place of birth: Čeladná, Czechoslovakia
- Height: 1.89 m (6 ft 2 in)
- Position: Goalkeeper

Youth career
- 1985–1992: TJ Nový Jičín
- 1992–1994: VP Frýdek-Místek
- 1994–1996: Kaučuk Opava
- 1996–1997: Dukla Hranice
- 1997–2001: SFC Opava

Senior career*
| Years | Team | Apps | (Gls) |
| 2001–2004 | SFC Opava | 76 | (0) |
| 2005–2009 | FC Baník Ostrava | 76 | (0) |
| 2006 | → SK Kladno (loan) | 16 | (0) |
| 2009–2010 | 1. FC Slovácko | 10 | (0) |
| 2010 | → FC Sibir Novosibirsk (loan) | 6 | (0) |
| 2011 | FC Sibir Novosibirsk | 3 | (0) |
| 2012–2014 | FC Tom Tomsk | 39 | (0) |
| 2015–2016 | SFC Opava | 35 | (0) |
| 2016–2017 | FC Baník Ostrava | 42 | (0) |
| 2018 | FK Ústí nad Labem | 14 | (0) |
- * Club domestic league appearances and goals

Petr Vašek (born 9 April 1979) is a Czech former football goalkeeper, who played 148 matches in the Czech First League between 2002 and 2017.

== Career ==
Vašek made his Czech First League debut for SFC Opava in February 2002, in a 2–0 loss against FK Chmel Blšany. Having turned out for the club in the First League 46 times, financial problems at Opava led the club to sell Vašek to rivals FC Baník Ostrava in January 2005. During his time with Baník Ostrava the club won the 2005 Czech Cup, although Vašek did not appear in the final.

As part of Tomáš Marek's February 2006 transfer from SK Kladno to Baník, Vašek moved the other way on a loan deal. He continued his loan into the 2006–07 season but played just one of Kladno's first four league matches, a 1–0 home loss against FK Jablonec. Vašek returned to Baník in the season's winter break and was announced by head coach Karel Večeřa as the starting goalkeeper for the second half of the season. He sustained a number of injuries through the rest of the season: a head injury against FK Baník Most, another head injury against FK Marila Příbram and then a knee injury in a 2–2 draw against AC Sparta Prague, which he could not finish and had to be substituted from.

Vašek went on to join 1. FC Slovácko in 2009. In February 2015, Vašek re-joined SFC Opava on loan from Slovácko. Having played for the club previously, Vašek signed a one-year contract with Baník Ostrava in July 2016. Vašek made his last appearance for Baník Ostrava in September 2017, after which he was reported to have had an argument with the club's sporting director. He moved to Second League side FK Ústí nad Labem on a free transfer in January 2018.

Across nine seasons, Vašek played 148 games in the Czech First League, keeping 45 clean sheets.
