= Yaroslav Ovsyannikov =

Russian footballer

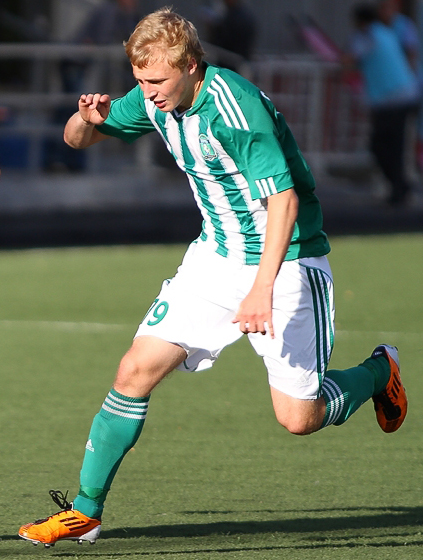

Personal information
- Full name: Yaroslav Valeryevich Ovsyannikov
- Date of birth: 14 May 1993 (age 33)
- Place of birth: Barnaul, Russia
- Height: 1.71 m (5 ft 7 in)
- Position: Defender

Senior career*
Years	Team	Apps	(Gls)
2011–2015	FC Tom Tomsk	1	(0)
2013	→ FC Sibiryak Bratsk (loan)	10	(1)
2013–2014	→ FC Volga Ulyanovsk (loan)	6	(0)
2014–2015	→ FC Tom-2 Tomsk	18	(0)
2015–2023	FC Dynamo Barnaul	109	(0)

International career
2012	Russia U19	1	(0)
- * Club domestic league appearances and goals

Yaroslav Valeryevich Ovsyannikov (Russian: Ярослав Валерьевич Овсянников; born 14 May 1993) is a Russian former professional football player.

== Club career ==
He made his Russian Premier League debut for FC Tom Tomsk on 12 March 2012 in a game against FC Volga Nizhny Novgorod.
