= Dmitri Golyshev =

Russian footballer

Personal information
- Full name: Dmitri Sergeyevich Golyshev
- Date of birth: 17 November 1985 (age 40)
- Place of birth: Moscow, Russian SFSR
- Height: 1.75 m (5 ft 9 in)
- Position: Midfielder

Youth career
- 2001–2003: FC Spartak-2 Moscow

Senior career*
Years	Team	Apps	(Gls)
2004–2010	FC Khimki	13	(1)
2008	→ FK Daugava Daugavpils (loan)	27	(4)
- * Club domestic league appearances and goals

Dmitri Sergeyevich Golyshev (Russian: Дмитрий Серге́евич Голышев; born 17 November 1985) is a former Russian professional footballer.

He is a brother of Pavel Golyshev.
