= Daniil Gavilovskiy =

Russian footballer

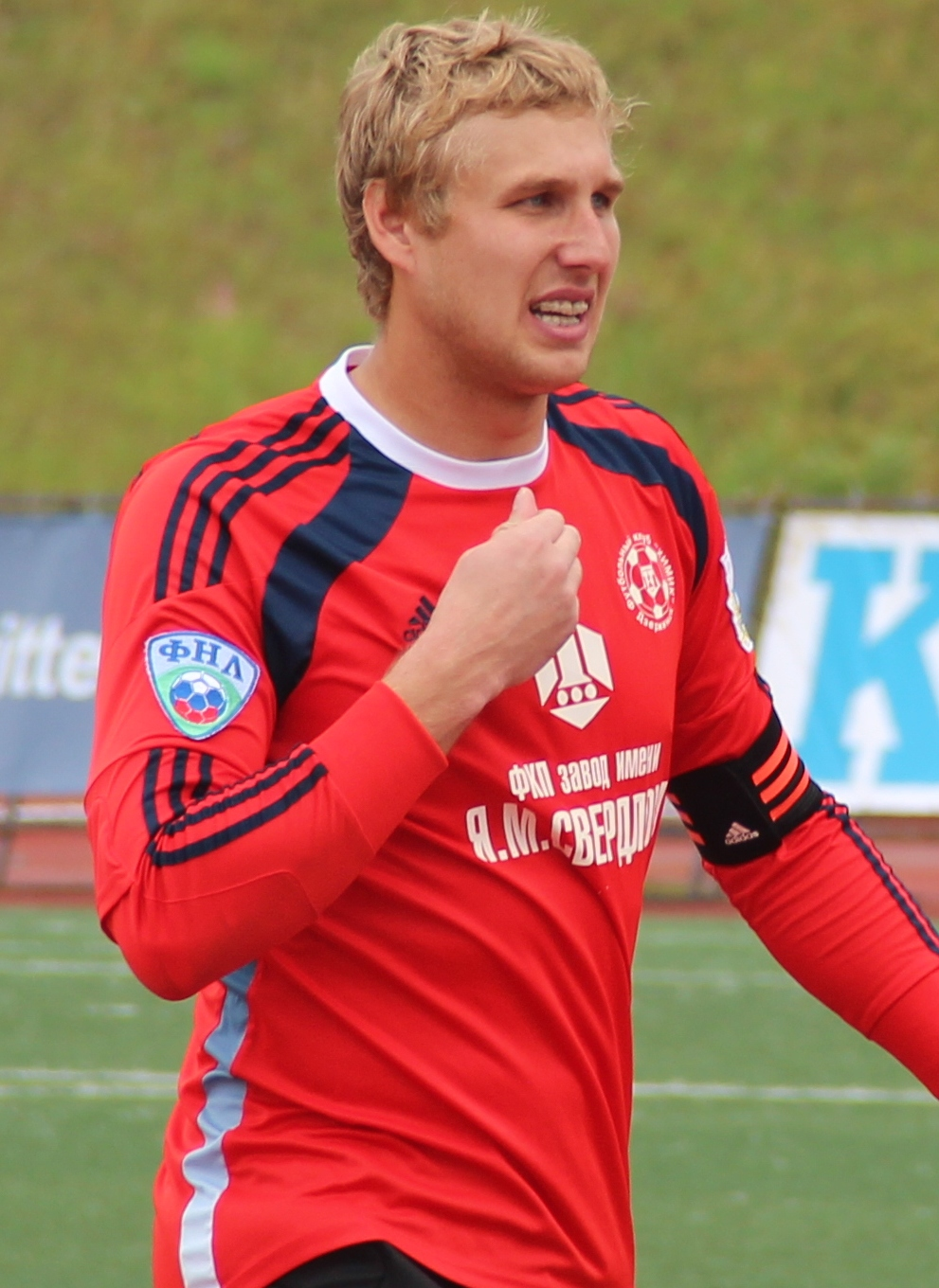

Personal information
- Full name: Daniil Yaroslavovich Gavilovskiy
- Date of birth: 21 March 1990 (age 36)
- Place of birth: Barnaul, Russian SFSR
- Height: 2.04 m (6 ft 8 in)
- Position: Goalkeeper

Senior career*
Years	Team	Apps	(Gls)
2006–2011	FC Dynamo Barnaul	8	(0)
2011–2013	FC Tom Tomsk	0	(0)
2012–2013	→ FC Khimik Dzerzhinsk (loan)	16	(0)
2013–2015	FC Khimik Dzerzhinsk	45	(0)
2015–2016	FC Tambov	17	(0)
2017–2018	FC Chita	22	(0)
2019–2021	FC Dynamo Barnaul	2	(0)
- * Club domestic league appearances and goals

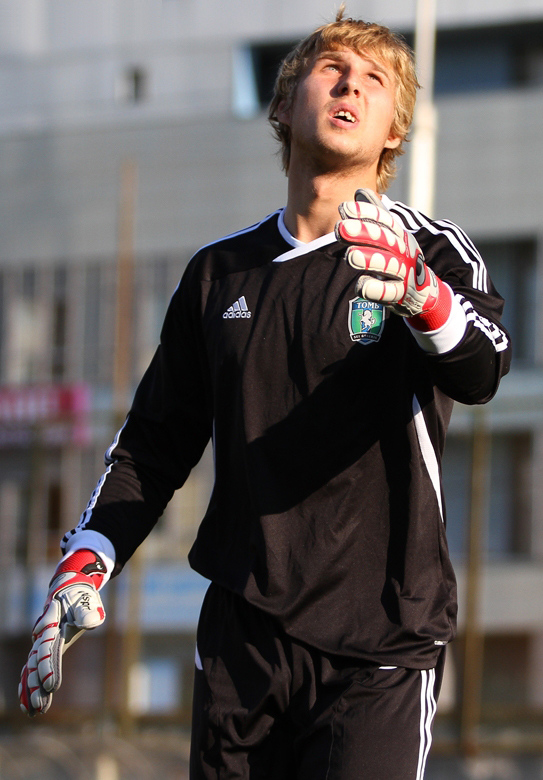
Daniil Gavilovskiy in 2011

Daniil Yaroslavovich Gavilovskiy (Russian: Даниил Ярославович Гавиловский; born 21 March 1990) is a Russian former football goalkeeper.

== Club career ==
He made his Russian Football National League debut for FC Khimik Dzerzhinsk on 13 July 2013 in a game against FC Baltika Kaliningrad.
