= Vasili Baskakov =

Russian footballer and coach

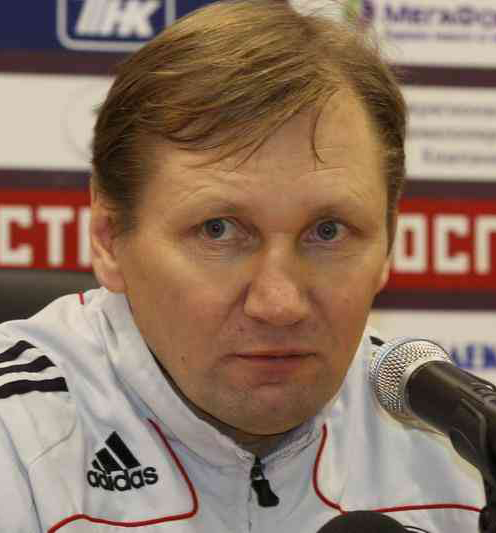
- With FC Tom Tomsk in 2008

Personal information
- Full name: Vasili Vladimirovich Baskakov
- Date of birth: 9 September 1962 (age 64)
- Place of birth: Parabel, Tomsk Oblast
- Height: 1.76 m (5 ft 9 1/2 in)
- Position: Defender

Senior career*
Years	Team	Apps	(Gls)
1981–1989	FC Tom Tomsk	188	(4)
1990	FC Kuzbass Kemerovo	28	(0)
1991–1993	FC Tom Tomsk	87	(5)
1994–1996	FC Kuzbass Kemerovo	83	(6)
1997	FC Tom Tomsk	9	(1)
Total		395	(16)

Managerial career
- 2004–2005: FC Tom Tomsk (assistant)
- 2004: FC Tom Tomsk (caretaker)
- 2006–2013: FC Tom Tomsk (assistant)
- 2008: FC Tom Tomsk (caretaker)
- 2011: FC Tom Tomsk (caretaker)
- 2013: FC Tom Tomsk (caretaker)
- 2013–2014: FC Tom Tomsk
- 2014–2018: FC Tom Tomsk (conditioning)
- 2018: FC Tom Tomsk (caretaker)
- 2018–2020: FC Tom Tomsk
- * Club domestic league appearances and goals

Vasili Vladimirovich Baskakov (Russian: Василий Владимирович Баскаков; born 9 September 1962) is a Russian professional football coach and a former player.
