= Sergei Skoblyakov =

Russian footballer

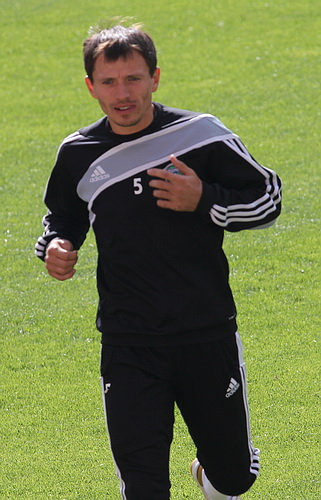

Personal information
- Full name: Sergei Leonidovich Skoblyakov
- Date of birth: 2 January 1977 (age 49)
- Place of birth: Moscow, Soviet Union
- Height: 1.64 m (5 ft 5 in)
- Position: Midfielder

Youth career
- FShM Moscow

Senior career*
Years	Team	Apps	(Gls)
1994–1995	FC TRASKO Moscow	76	(10)
1996–1997	FC Spartak-d Moscow	73	(9)
1998	FC Spartak-2 Moscow	41	(11)
1999	FC Tyumen	39	(3)
2000	FC Spartak-Chukotka Moscow	19	(1)
2001	FK Liepājas Metalurgs	27	(5)
2002–2011	FC Tom Tomsk	282	(17)
2012–2015	FC Khimki	79	(5)
2016	FC Odintsovo		
- * Club domestic league appearances and goals

Sergei Leonidovich Skoblyakov (Russian: Серге́й Леонидович Скобляков; born 2 January 1977) is a former Russian footballer.

He spent his playing career at FC Tom Tomsk for about 10 years.

His brother Dmitri Skoblyakov was also a professional footballer.
