= Pavel Golyshev =

Russian footballer

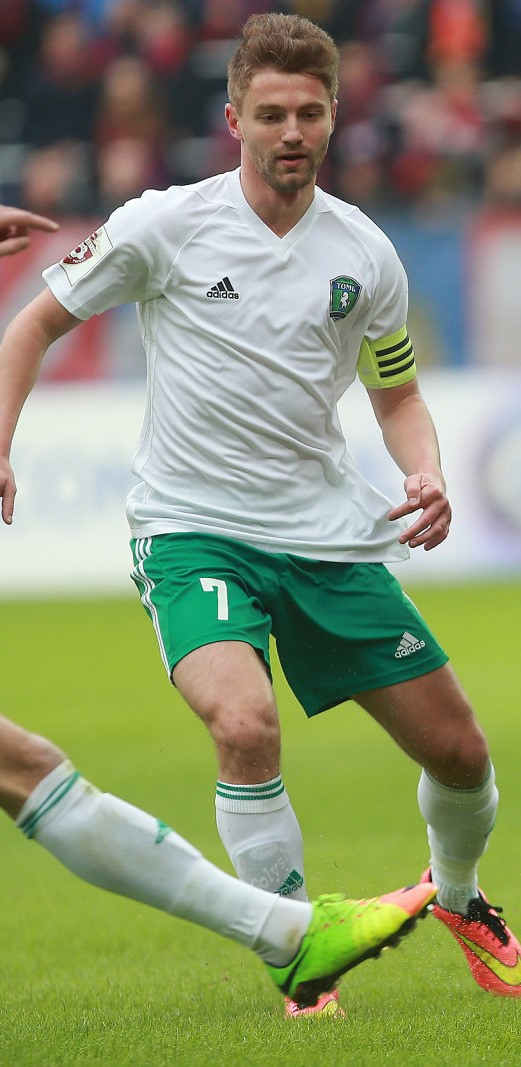
- Golyashev with Tom Tomsk in 2017

Personal information
- Full name: Pavel Sergeyevich Golyshev
- Date of birth: 7 July 1987 (age 39)
- Place of birth: Moscow, USSR
- Height: 1.77 m (5 ft 9 1/2 in)
- Positions: Forward; midfielder

Senior career*
| Years | Team | Apps | (Gls) |
| 2005–2009 | Moscow | 28 | (3) |
| 2010 | Spartak Moscow | 1 | (0) |
| 2010 | → Alania Vladikavkaz (loan) | 0 | (0) |
| 2011 | Tom Tomsk | 25 | (8) |
| 2012 | Krasnodar | 11 | (2) |
| 2012–2015 | Tom Tomsk | 77 | (16) |
| 2015 | Tosno | 23 | (4) |
| 2016–2017 | Tom Tomsk | 29 | (1) |
| 2017 | Krylia Sovetov Samara | 2 | (0) |
| 2018 | Baltika Kaliningrad | 8 | (0) |
| 2018 | Luch Vladivostok | 9 | (0) |
| 2019 | Nizhny Novgorod | 31 | (2) |
| 2020 | Navbahor Namangan | 11 | (0) |
| 2021–2023 | Rosich Moskovsky (amateur) | 54 | (55) |

International career
| 2007–2009 | Russia U21 | 3 | (0) |
| 2011 | Russia-2 | 1 | (0) |
- * Club domestic league appearances and goals

Pavel Sergeyevich Golyshev (Russian: Павел Серге́евич Голышев; born 7 July 1987) is a Russian former professional footballer.

== Club career ==
He made his Russian Premier League debut for Moscow on 6 November 2005 in a game against Shinnik Yaroslavl. He subsequently played in the RPL for Spartak Moscow, Tom Tomsk and Krasnodar.

== Personal life ==
He is a brother of Dmitri Golyshev.

== Career statistics ==
| Club | Season | League | | | Cup | | Continental | | Other | | Total | |
| Club | Season | Division | Apps | Goals | Apps | Goals | Apps | Goals | Apps | Goals | Apps | Goals |
|---|---|---|---|---|---|---|---|---|---|---|---|---|
| Moscow | 2005 | Russian Premier League | 1 | 0 | 2 | 1 | – | | – | | 3 | 1 |
| Moscow | 2006 | Russian Premier League | 0 | 0 | 1 | 0 | 1 (Note: Appearance in the UEFA Intertoto Cup) | 0 | – | | 2 | 0 |
| Moscow | 2007 | Russian Premier League | 12 | 1 | 2 | 0 | – | | – | | 14 | 1 |
| Moscow | 2008 | Russian Premier League | 5 | 0 | 0 | 0 | 0 | 0 | – | | 5 | 0 |
| Moscow | 2009 | Russian Premier League | 10 | 2 | 2 | 0 | – | | – | | 12 | 2 |
| Moscow | Total | | 28 | 3 | 7 | 1 | 1 | 0 | 0 | 0 | 36 | 4 |
| Spartak Moscow | 2010 | Russian Premier League | 1 | 0 | 0 | 0 | – | | – | | 1 | 0 |
| Alania Vladikavkaz (loan) | 2010 | Russian Premier League | 0 | 0 | 1 | 0 | – | | – | | 1 | 0 |
| Tom Tomsk | 2011–12 | Russian Premier League | 25 | 8 | 2 | 0 | – | | – | | 27 | 8 |
| Krasnodar | 2011–12 | Russian Premier League | 10 | 2 | – | | – | | – | | 10 | 2 |
| Krasnodar | 2012–13 | Russian Premier League | 1 | 0 | – | | – | | – | | 1 | 0 |
| Krasnodar | Total | | 11 | 2 | 0 | 0 | 0 | 0 | 0 | 0 | 11 | 2 |
| Tom Tomsk | 2012–13 | Russian First League | 21 | 7 | 1 | 0 | – | | 4 (Note: Appearances in the FNL Cup) | 0 | 26 | 7 |
| Tom Tomsk | 2013–14 | Russian Premier League | 24 | 1 | 2 | 0 | – | | 2 (Note: Appearances in the relegation play-offs) | 1 | 28 | 2 |
| Tom Tomsk | 2014–15 | Russian First League | 32 | 8 | 1 | 1 | – | | 7 (Note: Two appearances in the promotion play-offs, five appearances, two goals in the FNL Cup) | 2 | 40 | 11 |
| Tom Tomsk | Total | | 77 | 16 | 4 | 1 | 0 | 0 | 13 | 3 | 94 | 20 |
| Tosno | 2015–16 | Russian First League | 23 | 4 | 3 | 0 | – | | – | | 26 | 4 |
| Tom Tomsk | 2015–16 | Russian First League | 13 | 1 | – | | – | | 3 | 0 | 16 | 1 |
| Tom Tomsk | 2016–17 | Russian Premier League | 16 | 0 | 1 | 0 | – | | – | | 17 | 0 |
| Tom Tomsk | Total | | 29 | 1 | 1 | 0 | 0 | 0 | 3 | 0 | 33 | 1 |
| Krylia Sovetov Samara | 2017–18 | Russian First League | 2 | 0 | 1 | 0 | – | | – | | 3 | 0 |
| Baltika Kaliningrad | 2017–18 | Russian First League | 8 | 0 | – | | – | | – | | 8 | 0 |
| Baltika Kaliningrad | 2018–19 | Russian First League | 0 | 0 | 0 | 0 | – | | – | | 0 | 0 |
| Baltika Kaliningrad | Total | | 8 | 0 | 0 | 0 | 0 | 0 | 0 | 0 | 8 | 0 |
| Luch Vladivostok | 2018–19 | Russian First League | 9 | 0 | – | | – | | – | | 9 | 0 |
| Nizhny Novgorod | 2018–19 | Russian First League | 7 | 1 | – | | – | | 2 (Note: Appearances in the promotion play-offs) | 0 | 9 | 1 |
| Nizhny Novgorod | 2019–20 | Russian First League | 24 | 1 | 2 | 0 | – | | – | | 26 | 1 |
| Nizhny Novgorod | Total | | 31 | 2 | 2 | 0 | 0 | 0 | 2 | 0 | 35 | 2 |
| Navbahor Namangan | 2020 | Uzbekistan Super League | 11 | 0 | 0 | 0 | – | | – | | 11 | 0 |
| Career total | | | 255 | 36 | 21 | 2 | 1 | 0 | 18 | 3 | 295 | 41 |
