= FC Tom Tomsk =

Russian football club

Tom Tomsk
- Full name: OOO Football Club Tom'
- Nicknames: Sibiryaki (Siberians), Belo-Zelyonye (White-Greens)
- Founded: March 9, 1957; 69 years ago
- Dissolved: 2022; 4 years ago
- Ground: Trud Stadium, Tomsk
- Capacity: 10,028
- Owner: Tomsk Oblast
- 2021–22: FNL, 14th
- Website: fctomtomsk.ru
Home colours	Away colours

FC Tom Tomsk (Russian: Футбольный клуб Томь Томск) was a Russian professional football club, based in the Siberian city of Tomsk. The team played in Trud Stadium (Tomsk) before being dissolved in 2022.

== History ==
The team was previously named Burevestnik (1957), Tomich (1958, 1961–1963), Sibelektromotor (1959–1960), Torpedo (1964–1967, 1974–1978), Tomles (1968–1973) and Manometr (1979–1987). The club is currently named after the river of Tom, where Tomsk is located.

In the 1990s, the team acquired a number of players that would help them begin their ascent out of the Russian Second Division. Viktor Sebelev, Valery Konovalov and Ruslan Akhidzhak were key players of the early part of the decade with Sergei Ageyev, Vyacheslav Vishnevskiy and Dmitry Kudinov strengthening the team as they made a run on the division championship. In 1996, the team finished 2nd in the division, just falling short of promotion to the Russian First Division. In 1997, Tomsk finally achieved a significant goal when they advanced to the First Division with a strong season performance.

Previous logo, used until 2007

Following the promotion, the team acquired a significant set of new players including Sergei Zhukov, Andrei Talalaev and Mikhail Murashov to help keep the team in the First Division. However, Tomsk suffered a blow when their newly privatised sponsor, Eastern Oil Company (VNK) pulled out of the team and left them with no sponsor. At this point, advancement was a pipe dream with survival in the tougher division becoming a priority. It was at this point that the team also had to upgrade their stadium to new standards of the league.

The team played middling football for several years until the arrival of a new sponsor brought in much-needed funds and allowed the team to acquire new players and begin to compete. Third-place finishes in 2002 and 2003 left the team just short of promotion. However, the 2004 season brought new joy and Tomsk finished second in the division, earning promotion to the Russian Premier League for the 2005 season. The 2005 season saw Tomsk survive their first year in top-flight football with a 10th-place finish. In 2006, the team improved its position slightly with an 8th-place finish but in 2007, the club slipped to an 11th-place finish.

The former jersey sponsor Tomskneft, a local subsidiary of Yukos, has recently been sold to new investors. Today, the team is sponsored by the regional authorities.

The club's directors disclosed that the club needed to raise funds or it would go out of business due to debts of 200 million roubles in June 2009.

At the end of the 2018–19 season, they qualified for the Premier League promotion play-offs, but lost to FC Ufa with an aggregate score of 1–2.

In the 2020–21 Russian Football National League, Tom finished in the relegation zone, but remained in the league because two other clubs were disqualified for separate reasons.

Tom failed to receive the license for the 2022–23 FNL season and announced they will apply for the third-tier Russian Football National League 2 license. The FNL2 license was subsequently denied as well due to lack of financial guarantees.

=== League and cup history ===
Season	Div.	Pos.	Pl.	W.	D.	L.	GS	GA	Pts.	Cup	Europe	Top scorer (league)	Head Coach
1992	2nd, "East"	7	30	11	10	9	29	24	32	—	—	(Russia) Razzamazov – 8	(Russia) Pomeshchikov
1993	2nd, "East"	12	30	9	7	14	41	40	25	R1024	—	(Russia) Razzamazov – 14	(Russia) Pomeshchikov
1994	3rd, "East"	2	22	12	6	4	47	15	30	R256	—	(Russia) Akhidzhak – 18	(Russia) Pomeshchikov
1995	3rd, "East"	8	34	15	8	11	54	25	53	R512	—	(Russia) Akhidzhak – 13	(Russia) Pomeshchikov
1996	3rd, "East"	2	30	19	6	5	48	24	63	R256	—	(Russia) Akhidzhak – 9 (Russia) Sebelev – 9	(Russia) Yurin
1997	3rd, "East"	1	34	26	5	3	82	20	83	R32	—	(Russia) Kudinov – 13	(Russia) Yurin
1998	2nd	14	42	15	11	16	54	45	56	R16	—	(Russia) Zhukov – 11	(Russia) Yurin
1999	2nd	12	42	17	7	18	48	54	58	R16	—	(Russia) Sebelev – 11	(Russia) Yurin (Russia) Puzanov
2000	2nd	10	38	14	10	14	36	28	52	R32	—	(Russia) Ageyev – 5	(Russia) Puzanov
2001	2nd	7	34	12	11	11	31	28	47	R32	—	(Russia) Perednya – 10	(Russia) Puzanov (Russia) Petrakov
2002	2nd	3	34	17	10	7	51	23	61	R32	—	(Russia) Studzinsky – 8	(Russia) Petrakov
2003	2nd	3	42	25	10	7	55	23	85	R16	—	(Russia) Studzinsky – 9	(Russia) Petrakov
2004	2nd	2	42	27	5	10	70	38	86	R16	—	(Russia) Kiselyov – 17	(Russia) Galyamin (Russia) Gostenin
2005	1st	10	30	9	10	11	28	33	37	R32	—	(Russia) Medvedev – 5	(Russia) Stukalov (Russia) Byshovets
2006	1st	8	30	11	8	11	35	33	41	R32	—	(Russia) Pogrebnyak – 13	(Russia) Petrakov
2007	1st	11	30	8	11	11	37	35	35	R16	—	(North Macedonia) Maznov – 9	(Russia) Petrakov
2008	1st	13	30	7	8	15	23	35	29	SF	—	(Russia) Strelkov – 3 (Russia) Skoblyakov – 3 (Serbia) Jokić – 3	(Russia) Petrakov (Belarus) Romaschenko (Russia) Nepomnyashchy
2009	1st	9	30	11	8	11	31	39	41	QF	—	(Belarus) Kornilenko – 6	(Russia) Nepomnyashchy
2010	1st	8	30	10	7	13	35	43	37	R32	—	(Belarus) Kornilenko – 11	(Russia) Nepomnyashchy
2011–12	1st	15	44	8	13	23	30	70	37	R16	—	(Russia) Golyshev – 8	(Russia) Nepomnyashchy (Russia) Perednya
2012–13	2nd	2	32	19	8	5	57	34	65	R16	—	(Russia) Dimidko – 10	(Russia) Perednya
2013–14	1st	13	30	8	7	15	23	39	31	QF	—	(Russia) Panchenko – 7	(Russia) Davydov (Russia) Baskakov
2014–15	2nd	4	34	19	10	6	57	34	64	R64	—	(Russia) Bazhenov – 9	(Russia) Baskakov (Russia) Nepomnyashchy
2015–16	2nd	3	38	22	8	8	58	35	74	R64	—	(Russia) Pogrebnyak – 12	(Russia) Nepomnyashchy (Russia) Petrakov
2016–17	1st	16	30	3	5	22	17	64	14	R32	—	(Russia) Pugin – 4	(Russia) Petrakov
2017–18	2nd	15	38	10	11	17	36	56	41	R16	—	(Croatia) Puljić – 7	(Russia) Petrakov (Russia) Baskakov
2018–19	2nd	3	38	17	13	8	40	25	64	R64	—	(Russia) Kukharchuk – 8	(Russia) Baskakov
2019–20	2nd	9	27	10	9	8	32	26	39	R32	—	(Russia) Kazankov – 8	(Russia) Baskakov
2020–21	2nd	18	42	10	11	21	32	50	41	R128	—	(Russia) Krivtsov – 4 (Armenia) Simonyan – 4 (Canada) Ennin – 4	(Russia) Baskakov (Russia) Kerzhakov
2021–22	2nd	14	38	13	9	16	51	60	48	R128	—	(Russia) Stavpets – 17	(Russia) Zhukov

== Club records ==
Largest Margin of Victory — Dynamo Yakutsk – 9–1 (1995), FC Sakhalin Yuzhno-Sakhalinsk – 8–0 (1993), PFC Spartak Nalchik 8–0 (1998)

Largest Margin of Defeat – FC Dynamo Barnaul 0–7 (1962)

All time Leading Scorer – (Russia) Viktor Sebelev – 83 goals in 287 matches (1989–2004)

Most goals in a season – (Russia) Ruslan Akhidzhak – 18 goals in 21 matches (1994), (Russia) Denis Kiselyov – 18 goals in 37 matches (2004)

== Reserve squad ==
A farm club FC Tom-2 Tomsk began competing professionally in the third-tier Russian Professional Football League in the 2014–15 season. The team was dissolved after the 2015–16 season.

== Notable players ==
These players have had international caps for their respective countries. Players whose name is listed in bold represented their countries while playing for Tom.

Russia

- (Russia) Nikita Bazhenov
- (Russia) Albert Borzenkov
- (Russia) Denis Boyarintsev
- (Russia) Aleksei Bugayev
- (Russia) Artyom Dzyuba
- (Russia) Maksim Kanunnikov
- (Russia) Nikita Krivtsov
- (Russia) Fyodor Kudryashov
- (Russia) Denis Laktionov
- (Russia) Veniamin Mandrykin
- (Russia) Kirill Panchenko
- (Russia) Sergei Pesyakov
- (Russia) **Pavel Pogrebnyak**
- (Russia) Igor Portnyagin
- (Russia) Aleksei Rebko
- (Russia) Artyom Rebrov
- (Russia) Sergey Ryzhikov
- (Russia) Aleksandr Shirko
- (Russia) Aleksandr Sobolev
- (Russia) Dmitri Tarasov
- (Russia) Denis Yevsikov

Former USSR countries

- (Armenia) Artem Simonyan
- (Azerbaijan) Aleksandr Zhidkov
- (Belarus) Syarhey Amelyanchuk
- (Belarus) **Maksim Bardachow**
- (Belarus) **Vital Bulyha**
- (Belarus) Dmitri Ekimov
- (Belarus) **Egor Filipenko**
- (Belarus) **Vasily Khomutovsky**
- (Belarus) **Sergei Kornilenko**
- (Belarus) **Aliaksandr Kulchiy**
- (Belarus) **Pavel Nyakhaychyk**
- (Belarus) **Sergey Sosnovski**
- (Belarus) **Yan Tigorev**
- (Belarus) **Syarhey Yaskovich**
- (Georgia (country)) Nikoloz Togonidze
- (Kazakhstan) **Aleksandr Familtsev**
- (Moldova) **Valeriu Catînsus**
- (Moldova) **Ilie Cebanu**
- (Moldova) Valeriu Ciupercă
- (Moldova) Serghei Covalciuc
- (Moldova) **Eugen Sidorenco**
- (Moldova) **Oleg Șișchin**
- (Ukraine) Ilya Blyzniuk
- (Ukraine) Kyrylo Kovalchuk
- (Ukraine) Denys Onyshchenko
- (Ukraine) Pavlo Shkapenko
- (Uzbekistan) Aleksey Polyakov

Europe

- (Bosnia and Herzegovina) Branislav Krunić
- (Bosnia and Herzegovina) **Ognjen Vranješ**
- (Bulgaria) Zhivko Milanov
- (Bulgaria) Plamen Nikolov
- (Croatia) **Hrvoje Vejić**
- (Czech Republic) **Lukáš Droppa**
- (Czech Republic) Martin Jiránek
- (Estonia) Jevgeni Novikov
- (Estonia) **Sergei Pareiko**
- (Hungary) Norbert Németh
- (Hungary) **Ádám Pintér**
- (Lithuania) **Andrius Gedgaudas**
- (Lithuania) **Andrius Skerla**
- (North Macedonia) **Goran Maznov**
- (Montenegro) **Mladen Božović**
- (Romania) **Eric Bicfalvi**
- (Romania) Ovidiu Dănănae
- (Romania) Gabriel Mureșan
- (Romania) **Adrian Ropotan**
- (Romania) Pompiliu Stoica
- (Scotland) Garry O'Connor
- (Serbia and Montenegro) Đorđe Jokić
- (Slovakia) **Kornel Saláta**
- (Slovenia) **Aleksandar Radosavljević**

Asia

- (Japan) **Daisuke Matsui**
- (South Korea) **Kim Nam-Il**
