= 2010 FC Alania Vladikavkaz season =

Alania Vladikavkaz
2010 season
- Chairman: Alexander Stelmakh
- Manager: Vladimir Shevchuk
- Stadium: Republican Spartak Stadium
- Premier League: 15th
- Russian Cup: Progressed to 2011–12 season
- Top goalscorer: League: Two Players (4); All: Two Players (4)

The 2010 Alania Vladikavkaz season was the club's first season back in the Russian Premier League, the highest tier of football in Russia since their relegation at the end of the 2005 season. They finished the season in 15th position and were relegated back to the Russian First Division after one season.

== Squad ==
As of match played 28 November 2010

Number	Name	Nationality	Position	Date of birth (age)	Signed from	Signed in	Contract ends	Apps.	Goals
Goalkeepers
16	Dmitri Khomich	(Russia)	GK	4 October 1984 (aged 26)	Spartak Moscow	2010		43	0
22	David Gigolayev	(Russia)	GK	31 March 1989 (aged 21)	Alania Oktyabrskoye	2009		0	0
38	Omar Tsopanov	(Russia)	GK	4 July 1990 (aged 20)	Academy	2010		0	0
41	Mikhail Kerzhakov	(Russia)	GK	28 January 1987 (aged 23)	loan from Zenit St.Petersburg	2010	2010	18	0
53	Oleg Kudziyev	(Russia)	GK	3 May 1993 (aged 17)	Yunost Vladikavkaz	2010		0	0
92	Alan Haliyev	(Russia)	GK	10 May 1992 (aged 18)	Konoplyov Academy	2010		0	0
Defenders
2	Ibrahim Gnanou	(Burkina Faso)	DF	8 November 1986 (aged 24)	Midtjylland	2009		61	0
3	Valeri Tskhovrebov	(Russia)	DF	29 May 1989 (aged 21)	Academy	2009		1	0
4	Boris Rotenberg	(Finland)	DF	19 May 1986 (aged 24)	loan from Zenit St.Petersburg	2010	2010	16	0
13	Simeon Bulgaru	(Moldova)	DF	26 May 1985 (aged 25)	Viborg	2010		12	0
20	Dacosta Goore	(Ivory Coast)	DF	31 December 1984 (aged 25)	Moscow	2010		27	0
24	Abdoul-Gafar Mamah	(Togo)	DF	24 August 1985 (aged 25)	Sheriff Tiraspol	2010		13	0
25	Ivan Ivanov	(Bulgaria)	DF	25 February 1988 (aged 22)	CSKA Sofia	2010		26	2
34	Nariman Gusalov	(Russia)	DF	22 May 1990 (aged 20)	Academy	2010		2	0
35	Aslan Doguzov	(Russia)	DF	13 January 1991 (aged 19)	Avtodor Vladikavkaz	2010		0	0
36	Alan Soltanov	(Russia)	DF	11 June 1991 (aged 19)	Academy	2010		0	0
39	Soslan Kachmazov	(Russia)	DF	14 July 1991 (aged 19)	Academy	2010		0	0
43	David Bugulov	(Russia)	DF	14 July 1992 (aged 18)	Academy	2010		0	0
46	Albert Tskhovrebov	(Russia)	DF	1 May 1993 (aged 17)	Academy	2010		0	0
88	Alan Bagayev	(Russia)	DF	7 April 1991 (aged 19)	Amkar Perm	2010		0	0
Midfielders
5	George Florescu	(Romania)	MF	21 May 1984 (aged 26)	Midtjylland	2010		22	1
8	Georgy Gabulov	(Russia)	MF	4 September 1988 (aged 22)	Lokomotiv Moscow	2010		41	4
9	Arsen Khubulov	(Russia)	MF	13 December 1990 (aged 19)	Avtodor Vladikavkaz	2010		10	1
14	Aleksandr Marenich	(Russia)	MF	29 April 1989 (aged 21)	Moscow	2010		28	4
15	Aslan Mashukov	(Russia)	MF	4 November 1984 (aged 26)	Spartak Nalchik	2010		16	0
18	Dzhambulad Bazayev (captain)	(Russia)	MF	18 August 1979 (aged 31)	Rubin Kazan	2007			
21	Inal Pukhayev	(Russia)	MF	28 January 1992 (aged 18)	Amkar Perm	2010		0	0
23	Alan Dzutsev	(Russia)	MF	24 November 1991 (aged 19)	Academy	2009		1	0
29	Shota Bibilov	(Russia)	MF	6 August 1990 (aged 20)	Academy	2008			
40	Atsamaz Kumalagov	(Russia)	MF	13 September 1990 (aged 20)	Academy	2010		0	0
42	Yuri Kirillov	(Russia)	MF	19 January 1990 (aged 20)	loan from Dynamo Moscow	2010	2010	25	2
44	Georgi Dzantiyev	(Russia)	MF	14 December 1993 (aged 16)	Academy	2010		0	0
45	Georgi Bulatsev	(Russia)	MF	18 February 1992 (aged 18)	Academy	2010		0	0
51	Artur Gazdanov	(Russia)	MF	26 July 1992 (aged 18)	Academy	2010		0	0
54	Uruzmag Ikoev	(Russia)	MF	9 December 1990 (aged 19)	Academy	2010		0	0
70	Pavel Golyshev	(Russia)	MF	7 July 1987 (aged 23)	loan from Spartak Moscow	2010	2010	1	0
75	Marat Bikmaev	(Uzbekistan)	MF	1 January 1986 (aged 24)	Spartak Nalchik	2010		13	2
77	Aleksandr Arsoyev	(Russia)	MF	14 June 1990 (aged 20)	Dynamo Moscow	2009		5	0
91	Aleksandr Dzalayev	(Russia)	MF	21 September 1991 (aged 19)	Dynamo Moscow	2010		0	0
Forwards
7	Karen Oganyan	(Russia)	FW	25 June 1982 (aged 28)	KAMAZ	2010			
11	Sergiu Dadu	(Moldova)	FW	23 January 1981 (aged 29)	Midtjylland	2009			
17	Taras Tsarikayev	(Russia)	FW	17 June 1989 (aged 21)	Lokomotiv Moscow	2009			
30	Baba Collins	(Nigeria)	FW	2 December 1988 (aged 21)	loan from Midtjylland	2010		11	1
31	Eldar Nizamutdinov	(Russia)	FW	31 May 1981 (aged 29)	loan from Khimki	2010		24	1
47	Artur Khaymanov	(Russia)	FW	21 January 1990 (aged 20)	Academy	2010		0	0
52	Georgy Gogichayev	(Russia)	FW	16 January 1991 (aged 19)	Smena-Zenit St. Petersburg	2010		9	0
73	Ivan Stoyanov	(Bulgaria)	FW	24 July 1983 (aged 27)	CSKA Sofia	2010		24	2
90	Aleksandr Tikhonovetsky	(Russia)	FW	11 April 1979 (aged 31)	loan from Nizhny Novgorod	2010	2010	7	0
95	Dioh Williams	(Liberia)	FW	8 October 1986 (aged 24)	loan from AGF	2010	2010	2	0
97	Atsamaz Burayev	(Russia)	FW	5 February 1990 (aged 20)	Avtodor Vladikavkaz	2010		1	0
99	Aleksandr Alkhazov	(Russia)	FW	27 May 1984 (aged 26)	loan from Krylia Sovetov	2010		2	0
Away on loan
33	Aleksandr Gagloyev	(Russia)	MF	13 December 1990 (aged 19)	Academy	2007			
Players that left during the season
6	Sani Kaita	(Nigeria)	MF	3 August 1986 (aged 24)	loan from AS Monaco	2010	2010	6	0
10	Zajko Zeba	(Bosnia and Herzegovina)	MF	22 May 1983 (aged 27)	KAMAZ	2010		0	0
19	Vitali Chochiyev	(Russia)	MF	17 December 1979 (aged 30)	Kuban Krasnodar	2009		39	2
27	Georgi Bazayev	(Russia)	MF	26 August 1978 (aged 32)	Luch-Energiya Vladivostok	2008			
32	Francisco Zuela	(Angola)	DF	3 August 1983 (aged 27)	loan from Kuban Krasnodar	2010	2010	6	0
37	Artur Gadzaov	(Russia)	MF	4 May 1991 (aged 19)	Academy	2010		0	0
48	Oleg Tigiyev	(Russia)	MF	7 February 1990 (aged 20)	Academy	2010		0	0
55	Alan Alborov	(Russia)	FW	27 June 1990 (aged 20)	Avtodor Vladikavkaz	2010		0	0
79	Serhiy Kuznetsov	(Ukraine)	FW	31 August 1982 (aged 28)	loan from Karpaty Lviv	2010	2010	10	1

=== Out on loan ===
Note: Flags indicate national team as defined under FIFA eligibility rules; some limited exceptions apply. Players may hold more than one non-FIFA nationality.

No.	Pos.	Nation	Player
33	MF	RUS	Aleksandr Gagloyev (at (Russia) Neftekhimik Nizhnekamsk)

== Transfers ==
=== Winter ===
In: Note: Flags indicate national team as defined under FIFA eligibility rules; some limited exceptions apply. Players may hold more than one non-FIFA nationality.

No.	Pos.	Nation	Player
4	DF	FIN	Boris Rotenberg (on loan from (Russia) Zenit Saint Petersburg)
5	MF	ROU	Gheorghe Florescu (on loan from (Denmark) Midtjylland)
6	MF	NGA	Sani Kaita (on loan from (France) Monaco)
7	FW	RUS	Karen Oganyan (from (Russia) Volgar-Gazprom-2 Astrakhan)
8	FW	RUS	Georgy Gabulov (from (Russia) Lokomotiv-2 Moscow)
9	MF	RUS	Arsen Khubulov (from (Russia) Avtodor Vladikavkaz)
10	MF	BIH	Zajko Zeba (from (Russia) KAMAZ Naberezhnye Chelny)
14	FW	RUS	Aleksandr Marenich (from (Russia) Moscow)
15	MF	RUS	Aslan Mashukov (from (Russia) Spartak Nalchik)
16	GK	RUS	Dmitri Khomich (from (Russia) Spartak Moscow)
20	DF	CIV	Dacosta Goore (from (Russia) Moscow)
24	DF	TOG	Abdoul-Gafar Mamah (from (Moldova) Sheriff Tiraspol)
25	DF	BUL	Ivan Ivanov (from (Bulgaria) CSKA Sofia)
31	FW	RUS	Eldar Nizamutdinov (on loan from (Russia) Khimki)
32	DF	ANG	Francisco Zuela (on loan from (Russia) Kuban Krasnodar)
34	DF	RUS	Nariman Gusalov
35	DF	RUS	Aslan Doguzov (from (Russia) Avtodor Vladikavkaz)
36	DF	RUS	Alan Soltanov
37	MF	RUS	Artur Gadzaev
38	GK	RUS	Omar Tsopanov
39	DF	RUS	Soslan Kachmazov
40	MF	RUS	Atsamaz Kumalagov
41	GK	RUS	Mikhail Kerzhakov (on loan from (Russia) Zenit Saint Petersburg)
42	MF	RUS	Yuri Kirillov (on loan from (Russia) Dynamo Moscow)
43	DF	RUS	David Bugulov
44	MF	RUS	Georgi Dzantiyev
45	MF	RUS	Georgi Bulatsev
46	DF	RUS	Albert Tskhovrebov
47	FW	RUS	Artur Khaymanov (free agent in 2009, last team - Alania in 2008)
48	MF	RUS	Oleg Tigiyev (from (Russia) Academia Dimitrovgrad)
51	MF	RUS	Artur Gazdanov (from (Russia) CSKA Moscow youth)
52	FW	RUS	Georgy Gogichayev (from (Russia) Smena-Zenit St. Petersburg)
53	GK	RUS	Oleg Kudzhiyev
54	MF	RUS	Uruzmag Ikoev
55	FW	RUS	Alan Alborov (from (Russia) Avtodor Vladikavkaz)
73	MF	BUL	Ivan Stoyanov (from (Bulgaria) CSKA Sofia)
79	FW	UKR	Serhiy Kuznetsov (on loan from (Ukraine) Karpaty Lviv)
88	DF	RUS	Alan Bagayev (from (Russia) Amkar Perm)

Out: Note: Flags indicate national team as defined under FIFA eligibility rules; some limited exceptions apply. Players may hold more than one non-FIFA nationality.

No.	Pos.	Nation	Player
33	MF	RUS	Aleksandr Gagloyev (on loan to (Russia) Neftekhimik Nizhnekamsk)
37	MF	RUS	Artur Gadzaov (to (Russia) Amkar Perm)
—	GK	RUS	David Gigolayev
—	GK	MDA	Serghei Paşcenco (to (Moldova) Dinamo Bender)
—	GK	UKR	Mykola Tsygan (to (Russia) Krylia Sovetov Samara)
—	DF	RUS	Dmitri Godunok (to (Russia) Akademiya Togliatti)
—	DF	RUS	Mikhail Mischenko (end of loan from (Russia) Rubin Kazan)
—	DF	UKR	Andriy Proshyn (to (Russia) Rostov)
—	DF	BLR	Sergei Shtanyuk (retired)
—	DF	SRB	Nikola Valentić (to (Russia) Sibir Novosibirsk)
—	DF	RUS	Tamerlan Varziyev (to (Russia) Volgar-Gazprom Astrakhan)
—	MF	POR	Paulo Adriano
—	MF	RUS	Amzor Ailarov (to (Russia) FC Salyut Belgorod)
—	MF	CZE	Tomáš Čížek (to (Czech Republic) Baumit Jablonec)
—	MF	RUS	Soslan Dzhioyev (on loan to (Russia) Neftekhimik Nizhnekamsk)
—	FW	RUS	Dmitri Ryzhov (end of loan from (Russia) CSKA Moscow)
—	FW	RUS	Elbrus Tandelov (to (Russia) FC Mordovia Saransk)
—	FW	RUS	Aleksandr Yarkin (end of loan from (Russia) Rubin Kazan)

=== Summer ===
Note: Flags indicate national team as defined under FIFA eligibility rules; some limited exceptions apply. Players may hold more than one non-FIFA nationality.

No.	Pos.	Nation	Player
5	MF	ROU	Gheorghe Florescu (from (Denmark) Midtjylland, previously on loan)
13	DF	MDA	Simeon Bulgaru (from (Denmark) Viborg)
21	MF	RUS	Inal Pukhayev (from (Russia) Amkar Perm)
30	FW	NGA	Baba Collins (on loan from (Denmark) Midtjylland)
70	MF	RUS	Pavel Golyshev (on loan from (Russia) Spartak Moscow)
75	MF	UZB	Marat Bikmaev (from (Russia) Spartak Nalchik)
90	FW	RUS	Aleksandr Tikhonovetsky (on loan from (Russia) Nizhny Novgorod)
91	MF	RUS	Aleksandr Dzalayev (from (Russia) Dnepr Smolensk)
92	GK	RUS	Alan Khaliyev
95	FW	LBR	Dioh Williams (on loan from (Denmark) AGF)
97	FW	RUS	Atsamaz Burayev (from (Russia) Avtodor Vladikavkaz)
99	FW	RUS	Aleksandr Alkhazov (from (Russia) Krylia Sovetov Samara)

Out: Note: Flags indicate national team as defined under FIFA eligibility rules; some limited exceptions apply. Players may hold more than one non-FIFA nationality.

No.	Pos.	Nation	Player
6	MF	NGA	Sani Kaita (end of loan from (France) AS Monaco)
10	MF	BIH	Zajko Zeba (to (Bosnia and Herzegovina) Željezničar Sarajevo)
19	MF	RUS	Vitali Chochiyev (to (Russia) Salyut Belgorod)
27	MF	RUS	Georgi Bazayev
32	DF	ANG	Francisco Zuela (end of loan from (Russia) Kuban Krasnodar)
48	MF	RUS	Oleg Tigiev
55	FW	RUS	Alan Alborov
79	FW	UKR	Serhiy Kuznetsov (end of loan from (Ukraine) Karpaty Lviv)

== Competitions ==
=== Premier League ===
==== Results by round ====
Round	1	2	3	4	5	6	7	8	9	10	11	12	13	14	15	16	17	18	19	20	21	22	23	24	25	26	27	28	29	30
Ground	H	A	H	A	H	H	A	H	A	H	A	H	A	H	A	H	A	H	A	A	H	A	H	A	H	A	H	A	H	A
Result	D	L	D	L	L	W	W	D	L	W	L	L	L	W	L	W	L	D	L	W	D	L	L	L	D	L	D	D	W	D
Position	7	11	12	14	15	13	13	12	13	9	11	11	13	12	13	13	13	13	13	12	13	13	13	13	14	14	15	15	15	15

Updated to match(es) played on 28 November 2010. Source: See Results
A = Away; H = Home; W = Win; D = Draw; L = Loss

==== Results ====
14 March 2010 1	Alania Vladikavkaz	1 – 1	Saturn	Vladikavkaz
16:15 MSK (UTC+3)	Kirillov 23'; G.Bazayev (yellow card) 33'; Mamah (yellow card) 44'	Report	Ivanov 10'; Nemov (yellow card) 60' (yellow-red card) 67'; Kovel (yellow card) 82'; Sapeta (yellow card) 90'; Evseev (yellow card) 90'	Stadium: Republican Spartak Stadium; Attendance: 28,000; Referee: Aleksandr Gvardis

19 March 2010 2	Spartak Nalchik	2 – 1	Alania Vladikavkaz	Nalchik
18:30 MSK (UTC+3)	Shchanitsyn 23'; Gogua 45'; Kisenkov (yellow card) 67'; Amisulashvili (yellow card) 90'	Report	Nizamutdinov (yellow card) 44'; Bazayev 67' (pen.); Mamah (yellow card) 88'	Stadium: Spartak Stadium; Attendance: 10,000; Referee: Almir Kayumov

26 March 2010 3	Alania Vladikavkaz	0 – 0	Amkar Perm	Vladikavkaz
17:00 MSK (UTC+3)	Kaita (red card) 35'; Mamah (yellow card) 38'; Chochiyev (yellow card) 54'	Report	Sadikov (yellow card) 37'; Gaál (yellow card) 44'; Belorukov (yellow card) 53'	Stadium: Republican Spartak Stadium; Attendance: 17,000; Referee: Sergei Karasev

3 April 2010 4	Anzhi Makhachkala	2 – 0	Alania Vladikavkaz	Makhachkala
16:15 MSK (UTC+4)	Streltsov 24' (pen.); Holenda (yellow card) 41' (goal) 53'	Report	Stoyanov (yellow card) 35'	Stadium: Dynamo Stadium; Attendance: 12,500; Referee: Yuri Baskakov

11 April 2010 5	Alania Vladikavkaz	1 – 3	CSKA Moscow	Vladikavkaz
16:15 MSK (UTC+4)	Kuznetsov 57'; Gnanou (yellow card) 46' (yellow-red card) 69'; Goore (yellow card) 72'	Report	Guilherme 6'; Krasić 45'; Dzagoev 70' (pen.); Odiah (yellow card) 88'	Stadium: Republican Spartak Stadium; Attendance: 25,000; Referee: Vyacheslav Popov

17 April 2010 6	Alania Vladikavkaz	2 – 1	Sibir Novosibirsk	Vladikavkaz
18:30 MSK (UTC+4)	Gabulov (yellow card) 65'; Kirillov 72'; Mamah (yellow card) 79'; Ivanov (yellow card) 86'; Marenich 87'	Report	Molosh (yellow card) 43'; Čížek 46'; Klimavičius (yellow card) 83'	Stadium: Republican Spartak Stadium; Attendance: 17,500; Referee: Evgeny Turbin

25 April 2010 7	Rostov	0 – 1	Alania Vladikavkaz	Rostov-on-Don
20:45 MSK (UTC+4)	Grigalava (yellow card) 47'; Khagush (yellow card) 83'	Report	Stoyanov 13'; Gnanou (yellow card) 32'; Florescu (yellow card) 77'	Stadium: Olimp-2; Attendance: 12,000; Referee: Aleksei Nikolaev

2 May 2010 8	Alania Vladikavkaz	1 – 1	Rubin Kazan	Vladikavkaz
16:15 MSK (UTC+4)	Stoyanov 32'; Kuznetsov (yellow card) 73'	Report	Jordi (yellow card) 26'; Navas (yellow card) 30'; Kasaev 88'; Orekhov (yellow card) 89'	Stadium: Republican Spartak Stadium; Attendance: 17,000; Referee: Maksim Layushkin

5 May 2010 9	Krylia Sovetov	1 – 0	Alania Vladikavkaz	Samara
16:30 MSK (UTC+4)	Strelkov 50'; Gridnev (yellow card) 60'; Belozyorov (yellow card) 90'	Report	Mamah (yellow card) 70'; Goore (yellow card) 72'; Gabulov (yellow card) 84'; Kuznetsov (yellow card) 90'	Stadium: Metallurg Stadium; Attendance: 9,200; Referee: Mikhail Vilkov

10 May 2010 10	Alania Vladikavkaz	5 – 2	Spartak Moscow	Vladikavkaz
14:00 MSK (UTC+4)	Marenich 5'; Gabulov 9', 69'; Kirillov (yellow card) 25'; Florescu (yellow card) 51'; Khubulov (yellow card) 78' (goal) 88'; Ivanov (yellow card) 83'; Oganyan 90'; Gnanou (yellow card) 90'	Report	Welliton 7' (penalty missed) 90'; Makeyev (yellow card) 13'; Florescu 30' (o.g.); Kozlov (yellow card) 52'	Stadium: Republican Spartak Stadium; Attendance: 20,000; Referee: Vladimir Pettay

15 May 2010 11	Dynamo Moscow	2 – 0	Alania Vladikavkaz	Khimki
18:30 MSK (UTC+4)	K.Kombarov 19', 49'; Wilkshire (yellow card) 74'	Report	Florescu (yellow card) 4'; Gnanou (yellow card) 64'	Stadium: Arena Khimki; Attendance: 7,053; Referee: Vyacheslav Popov

9 July 2010 12	Alania Vladikavkaz	1 – 3	Zenit St.Petersburg	Vladikavkaz
18:45 MSK (UTC+4)	Khomich (yellow card) 26'; Mamah (yellow card) 33'; Ivanov 79'	Report	Shirokov 26' (pen.); Bystrov 34'; Lazović 39'; Malafeev (yellow card) 44'; Zyryanov (yellow card) 52'	Stadium: Republican Spartak Stadium; Attendance: 20,000; Referee: Vyacheslav Kharlamov

18 July 2010 13	Lokomotiv Moscow	3 – 0	Alania Vladikavkaz	Moscow
20:30 MSK (UTC+4)	Aliyev 15'; Sychev 45', 47'; Torbinski (yellow card) 54'; Tarasov (yellow card) 74'	Report	Mashukov (yellow card) 45'; Goore (yellow card) 47'; Dadu (yellow card) 74'	Stadium: Lokomotiv Stadium; Attendance: 11,421; Referee: Nikolai Ivanov

24 July 2010 14	Alania Vladikavkaz	2 – 1	Tom Tomsk	Vladikavkaz
18:45 MSK (UTC+4)	Ivanov (yellow card) 32'; Marenich 59' (yellow card) 59'; Gnanou 70'; Kerzhakov (yellow card) 90'	Report	Kornilenko 14' (pen.) (yellow card) 47'; Gultyayev (yellow card) 37'; Dzhioyev (yellow card) 48'	Stadium: Republican Spartak Stadium; Attendance: 15,000; Referee: Maksim Layushkin

31 July 2010 15	Terek Grozny	2 – 0	Alania Vladikavkaz	Grozny
18:45 MSK (UTC+4)	Maurício (yellow card) 51' (goal) 57'; Asildarov (yellow card) 73'; Utsiyev 83'	Report	Rotenberg (yellow card) 36'; Mashukov (yellow card) 36'; Gabulov (yellow card) 53' (yellow-red card) 76'; Bibilov (red card) 90'	Stadium: Sultan Bilimkhanov Stadium; Attendance: 6,000; Referee: Vladimir Kazmenko

8 August 2010 16	Alania Vladikavkaz	1 – 0	Spartak Nalchik	Vladikavkaz
21:00 MSK (UTC+4)	Nizamutdinov 42'; Mashukov (yellow card) 67'; Florescu (yellow card) 74'	Report		Stadium: Republican Spartak Stadium; Attendance: 14,000; Referee: Vladislav Bezborodov

15 August 2010 17	Amkar Perm	1 – 0	Alania Vladikavkaz	Perm
17:45 MSK (UTC+4)	Popov (yellow card) 33'; Belorukov (yellow card) 44'; Volkov 65'; Kushev (yellow card) 68'; Cherenchikov (yellow card) 90'	Report	Marenich (yellow card) 37'; Mashukov (yellow card) 53'; Gabulov (yellow card) 71'; Tsarikayev (yellow card) 90'	Stadium: Zvezda Stadium; Attendance: 16,500; Referee: Nikolai Ivanov

22 August 2010 18	Alania Vladikavkaz	0 – 0	Anzhi Makhachkala	Vladikavkaz
20:45 MSK (UTC+4)	Bulgaru (yellow card) 88'; Goore (yellow card) 90'	Report	Josan (yellow card) 44'; Shukurov (yellow card) 54'; Strelkov (yellow card) 59'	Stadium: Republican Spartak Stadium; Attendance: 10,000; Referee: Stanislav Sukhina

29 August 2010 19	CSKA Moscow	2 – 1	Alania Vladikavkaz	Moscow
18:30 MSK (UTC+4)	Doumbia 4'; Tošić 69'	Report	Ivanov (yellow card) 26'; Mashukov (yellow card) 44'; Florescu 90' (pen.)	Stadium: Arena Khimki; Attendance: 8,000; Referee: Vitali Meshkov

11 September 2010 20	Sibir Novosibirsk	1 – 2	Alania Vladikavkaz	Novosibirsk
13:00 MSK (UTC+4)	Zinovyev 12'; Čížek (yellow card) 38'	Report	Gnanou (yellow card) 62' (goal) 90'; Rotenberg (yellow card) 81'; Bikmaev (yellow card) 88'; Collins 90'	Stadium: Spartak Stadium; Attendance: 6,500; Referee: Aleksei Eskov

18 September 2010 21	Alania Vladikavkaz	0 – 0	Rostov	Vladikavkaz
17:15 MSK (UTC+4)	Gnanou (yellow card) 48'; Florescu (yellow card) 85'	Report		Stadium: Republican Spartak Stadium; Attendance: 10,000; Referee: Aleksandr Kolobaev

25 September 2010 22	Rubin Kazan	1 – 0	Alania Vladikavkaz	Kazan
18:00 MSK (UTC+4)	Bocchetti 38'	Report	Florescu (yellow card) 44'; Goore (yellow card) 52'; Bikmaev (yellow card) 62'; Gnanou (yellow card) 63'	Stadium: Central Stadium; Attendance: 14,360; Referee: Aleksei Nikolaev

2 October 2010 23	Alania Vladikavkaz	2 – 3	Krylia Sovetov	Vladikavkaz
16:15 MSK (UTC+4)	Marenich 75' (yellow card) 90'; Bikmaev 78' (yellow card) 90'	Report	Samsonov 32'; Tsallagov 40'; Yakovlev 74'; Leilton (yellow card) 87'	Stadium: Republican Spartak Stadium; Attendance: 8,000; Referee: Vladimir Pettay

16 October 2010 24	Spartak Moscow	3 – 0	Alania Vladikavkaz	Moscow
MSK (UTC+4)	Ari 24'; Alex 39'; Ivanov 53' (o.g.); Pareja (yellow card) 84'; Maidana (yellow card) 90'	Report	Bulgaru (yellow card) 38'; Gnanou (yellow card) 76'	Stadium: Luzhniki Stadium; Attendance: 10,500; Referee: Stanislav Sukhina

23 October 2010 25	Alania Vladikavkaz	0 – 0	Dynamo Moscow	Vladikavkaz
14:00 MSK (UTC+4)	Mashukov (yellow card) 35'; Collins (yellow card) 45'; Bulgaru (yellow card) 85'	Report	Ropotan (yellow card) 60'	Stadium: Republican Spartak Stadium; Attendance: 13,000; Referee: Vladimir Kazmenko

30 October 2010 26	Zenit St.Petersburg	3 – 0	Alania Vladikavkaz	Saint Petersburg
MSK (UTC+3)	Lazović 16'; Kerzhakov 42', 52'	Report	Baba Collins (yellow card) 26'; Rotenberg (yellow card) 27'; Goore (yellow card) 43'; Gabulov (yellow card) 74'	Stadium: Petrovsky Stadium; Attendance: 20,500; Referee: Aleksei Eskov

7 November 2010 27	Alania Vladikavkaz	0 – 0	Lokomotiv Moscow	Vladikavkaz
16:30 MSK (UTC+3)	Collins (yellow card) 21'; Ivanov (yellow card) 30'; Gnanou (yellow card) 42'	Report	Ďurica (red card) 28'; Gatagov (yellow card) 77'	Stadium: Republican Spartak Stadium; Attendance: 15,000; Referee: Eduard Malyi

13 November 2010 28	Tom Tomsk	1 – 1	Alania Vladikavkaz	Tomsk
14:30 MSK (UTC+3)	Dzyuba 5' (pen.); Starikov (yellow card) 46'; Kudryashov (yellow card) 78'	Report	Bulgaru (yellow card) 4'; Gnanou (yellow card) 17'; Gabulov 65'; Collins (yellow card) 70'; Bikmaev (yellow card) 90'	Stadium: Trud Stadium; Attendance: 8,000; Referee: Maksim Layushkin

20 November 2010 29	Alania Vladikavkaz	2 – 1	Terek Grozny	Vladikavkaz
14:00 MSK (UTC+3)	Bikmaev 64'; Gabulov 77'	Report	Sadayev (yellow card) 18'; Ediyev 45'; Utsiyev (yellow card) 69'; Maurício (yellow card) 82'; Ferreira (yellow card) 90'	Stadium: Republican Spartak Stadium; Attendance: 15,000; Referee: Mikhail Vilkov

28 November 2010 30	Saturn	1 – 1	Alania Vladikavkaz	Ramensky District
14:00 MSK (UTC+3)	Topić (yellow card) 29'; Zelão 32'; Nakhushev (yellow card) 90'	Report	Ivanov 13'; Mamah (yellow card) 36'; Florescu (yellow card) 68'; Tsarikayev (yellow card) 71'	Stadium: Saturn Stadium; Attendance: 2,000; Referee: Evgeny Turbin

==== League table ====
Pos	Team	Pld	W	D	L	GF	GA	GD	Pts	Qualification or relegation
12	Terek Grozny	30	8	9	13	28	34	−6	33	
13	Krylia Sovetov Samara	30	7	10	13	28	40	−12	31	
14	Amkar Perm	30	8	6	16	24	35	−11	30	
15	Alania Vladikavkaz (Note: Despite being relegated, Alania Vladikavkaz will participate in UEFA Europa League 3rd qualifying round as finalists of the 2010–11 Russian Cup competition, lost to CSKA Moscow.) (R)	30	7	9	14	25	41	−16	30	Relegation to Football National League and qualification to Europa League third qualifying round
16	Sibir Novosibirsk (R)	30	4	8	18	34	58	−24	20	Relegation to Football National League

Source: RFPL (in Russian)
Rules for classification: 1st points; 2nd matches won; 3rd head-to-head (points, matches won, goal difference, goals scored, away goals scored); 4th goal difference; 5th goals scored; 6th away goals scored; 7th position in previous season or decision game
(R) Relegated

=== Russian Cup ===
13 July 2010 Round of 32	KAMAZ Naberezhnye Chelny	0 – 0 (a.e.t.) (2 – 4 p)	Alania Vladikavkaz	Naberezhnye Chelny
18:00 MSK (UTC+4)	Gogniyev (yellow card) 99'	Report	Ivanov (yellow card) 49'; Tsarikayev (yellow card) 98'; Gabulov (yellow card) 99'	Stadium: KAMAZ Stadium; Attendance: 5,500; Referee: Vladimir Kazmenko
	Penalties
	Kozlov (penalty missed); Kobyalko (penalty scored); Krendelev (penalty scored); Serdyukov (penalty missed)		Gabulov (penalty scored); Florescu (penalty scored); Khubulov (penalty scored); Mashukov (penalty scored)

22 September 2010 Round of 16	Alania Vladikavkaz	0 – 0 (a.e.t.) (5 – 4 p)	Gornyak Uchaly	Vladikavkaz
16:00 MSK (UTC+4)	Rotenberg (yellow card) 57'; Khubulov (yellow card) 60'; Gusalov (yellow card) 61'; Tsarikayev (yellow card) 65'; Collins (yellow card) 119'	Report	Tokarev (yellow card) 25'; Samoylov (yellow card) 78'; Khaliullin (yellow card) 119'	Stadium: Republican Spartak Stadium; Attendance: 4,000; Referee: Vyacheslav Popov
	Penalties
	Florescu (penalty scored); Khubulov (penalty scored); Kirillov (penalty scored); Gusalov (penalty scored); Marenich (penalty scored)		Ovchinnikov (penalty scored); Sorokin (penalty scored); Alborov (penalty scored); Samoylov (penalty scored); Khaliullin (penalty missed)

Quarterfinal took place during the 2011–12 season.

== Squad statistics ==
As of match played 28 November 2010

=== Appearances and goals ===
No.	Pos	Nat	Player	Total		Premier League		Russian Cup	
No.	Pos	Nat	Player	Apps	Goals	Apps	Goals	Apps	Goals
2	DF	(Burkina Faso) BFA	Ibrahim Gnanou	26	2	24+1	2	1	0
3	DF	(Russia) RUS	Valeri Tskhovrebov	1	0	0	0	1	0
4	DF	(Finland) FIN	Boris Rotenberg	16	0	13+2	0	1	0
5	MF	(Romania) ROU	George Florescu	22	1	20	1	1+1	0
7	FW	(Russia) RUS	Karen Oganyan	26	1	18+8	1	0	0
8	MF	(Russia) RUS	Georgy Gabulov	27	4	24+2	4	1	0
9	MF	(Russia) RUS	Arsen Khubulov	10	1	8	1	0+2	0
11	FW	(Moldova) MDA	Sergiu Dadu	5	1	0+4	1	1	0
13	DF	(Moldova) MDA	Simeon Bulgaru	12	0	12	0	0	0
14	MF	(Russia) RUS	Aleksandr Marenich	28	4	18+8	4	2	0
15	MF	(Russia) RUS	Aslan Mashukov	16	0	15	0	0+1	0
16	GK	(Russia) RUS	Dmitri Khomich	16	0	16	0	0	0
17	FW	(Russia) RUS	Taras Tsarikayev	9	0	3+4	0	2	0
18	MF	(Russia) RUS	Dzhambulad Bazayev	7	1	6+1	1	0	0
20	DF	(Ivory Coast) CIV	Dacosta Goore	27	0	26	0	1	0
24	DF	(Togo) TOG	Abdoul-Gafar Mamah	13	0	11+2	0	0	0
25	DF	(Bulgaria) BUL	Ivan Ivanov	26	2	23+1	2	2	0
29	MF	(Russia) RUS	Shota Bibilov	1	0	0+1	0	0	0
30	FW	(Nigeria) NGA	Babajide Collins	11	1	7+3	1	0+1	0
31	FW	(Russia) RUS	Eldar Nizamutdinov	24	1	19+4	1	1	0
34	MF	(Russia) RUS	Nariman Gusalov	2	0	1	0	1	0
41	GK	(Russia) RUS	Mikhail Kerzhakov	18	0	14+2	0	2	0
42	MF	(Russia) RUS	Yuri Kirillov	25	2	15+8	2	2	0
52	FW	(Russia) RUS	Georgy Gogichayev	9	0	4+4	0	0+1	0
70	MF	(Russia) RUS	Pavel Golyshev	1	0	0	0	1	0
73	MF	(Bulgaria) BUL	Ivan Stoyanov	24	2	21+3	2	0	0
75	FW	(Uzbekistan) UZB	Marat Bikmaev	13	2	7+6	2	0	0
90	FW	(Russia) RUS	Aleksandr Tikhonovetsky	7	0	3+3	0	1	0
95	FW	(Liberia) LBR	Dioh Williams	2	0	0+1	0	1	0
97	FW	(Russia) RUS	Atsamaz Burayev	1	0	0+1	0	0	0
99	FW	(Russia) RUS	Aleksandr Alkhazov	2	0	0+2	0	0	0
Players who left Alania Vladikavkaz during the season:
6	MF	(Nigeria) NGA	Sani Kaita	6	0	6	0	0	0
19	MF	(Russia) RUS	Vitali Chochiyev	5	0	3+2	0	0	0
27	MF	(Russia) RUS	Georgi Bazayev	5	0	4+1	0	0	0
32	MF	(Angola) ANG	Francisco Zuela	6	0	6	0	0	0
79	FW	(Ukraine) UKR	Serhiy Kuznetsov	10	1	7+3	1	0	0

=== Goal Scorers ===
Place	Position	Nation	Number	Name	Premier League	Russian Cup	Total
1	MF	(Russia)	8	Georgy Gabulov	4	0	4
1	MF	(Russia)	14	Aleksandr Marenich	4	0	4
3	DF	(Burkina Faso)	2	Ibrahim Gnanou	2	0	2
3	DF	(Bulgaria)	25	Ivan Ivanov	2	0	2
3	MF	(Russia)	42	Yuri Kirillov	2	0	2
3	FW	(Bulgaria)	73	Ivan Stoyanov	2	0	2
3	MF	(Uzbekistan)	75	Marat Bikmaev	2	0	2
8	MF	(Romania)	5	George Florescu	1	0	1
8	MF	(Russia)	9	Arsen Khubulov	1	0	1
8	MF	(Russia)	18	Dzhambulad Bazayev	1	0	1
8	FW	(Russia)	7	Karen Oganyan	1	0	1
8	FW	(Moldova)	11	Sergiu Dadu	1	0	1
8	FW	(Nigeria)	30	Babajide Collins	1	0	1
8	FW	(Russia)	31	Eldar Nizamutdinov	1	0	1
8	FW	(Ukraine)	79	Serhiy Kuznetsov	1	0	1
				TOTALS	26	0	26

=== Clean sheets ===
Place	Position	Nation	Number	Name	Premier League	Russian Cup	Total
1	GK	(Russia)	41	Mikhail Kerzhakov	3	2	5
2	GK	(Russia)	16	Dmitri Khomich	4	0	4
				TOTALS	7	2	9

=== Disciplinary record ===
Number	Nation	Position	Name	Premier League		Russian Cup		Total	
Number	Nation	Position	Name	Booked	Sent off (straight red)	Booked	Sent off (straight red)	Booked	Sent off (straight red)
2	(Burkina Faso)	DF	Ibrahim Gnanou	12	1	0	0	12	1
4	(Finland)	DF	Boris Rotenberg	3	0	1	0	4	0
5	(Romania)	MF	George Florescu	7	0	0	0	7	0
8	(Russia)	MF	Georgy Gabulov	6	1	1	0	7	1
9	(Russia)	MF	Arsen Khubulov	1	0	1	0	2	0
11	(Moldova)	FW	Sergiu Dadu	1	0	0	0	1	0
13	(Moldova)	DF	Simeon Bulgaru	4	0	0	0	4	0
14	(Russia)	MF	Aleksandr Marenich	3	0	0	0	3	0
15	(Russia)	MF	Aslan Mashukov	6	0	0	0	6	0
16	(Russia)	GK	Dmitri Khomich	1	0	0	0	1	0
17	(Russia)	FW	Taras Tsarikayev	2	0	2	0	4	0
20	(Ivory Coast)	DF	Dacosta Goore	6	0	0	0	6	0
24	(Togo)	DF	Abdoul-Gafar Mamah	6	0	0	0	6	0
25	(Bulgaria)	DF	Ivan Ivanov	5	0	1	0	6	0
29	(Russia)	MF	Shota Bibilov	0	1	0	0	0	1
30	(Nigeria)	FW	Babajide Collins	4	0	1	0	5	0
31	(Russia)	FW	Eldar Nizamutdinov	1	0	0	0	1	0
34	(Russia)	DF	Nariman Gusalov	0	0	1	0	1	0
41	(Russia)	GK	Mikhail Kerzhakov	1	0	0	0	1	0
42	(Russia)	MF	Yuri Kirillov	1	0	0	0	1	0
73	(Bulgaria)	FW	Ivan Stoyanov	1	0	0	0	1	0
75	(Uzbekistan)	MF	Marat Bikmaev	4	0	0	0	4	0
Players who left Alania Vladikavkaz during the season:
6	(Nigeria)	MF	Sani Kaita	0	1	0	0	0	1
19	(Russia)	MF	Vitali Chochiyev	1	0	0	0	1	0
27	(Russia)	MF	Georgi Bazayev	1	0	0	0	1	0
79	(Ukraine)	FW	Serhiy Kuznetsov	2	0	0	0	2	0
			TOTALS	79	4	8	0	87	4
