= List of Russian football transfers winter 2011–12 =

This is a list of Russian football transfers in the winter transfer window 2011–12 by club. Only clubs of the 2011–12 Russian Premier League are included.

== Russian Premier League 2011-12 ==
=== Amkar Perm ===
In: Note: Flags indicate national team as defined under FIFA eligibility rules; some limited exceptions apply. Players may hold more than one non-FIFA nationality.

No.	Pos.	Nation	Player
1	GK	RUS	Roman Gerus (from Dynamo Bryansk)
26	FW	SVK	Martin Jakubko (from (Slovakia) Dukla Banská Bystrica)

Out: Note: Flags indicate national team as defined under FIFA eligibility rules; some limited exceptions apply. Players may hold more than one non-FIFA nationality.

No.	Pos.	Nation	Player
4	DF	UKR	Vitaliy Fedoriv (to (Ukraine) Kryvbas Kryvyi Rih)
22	MF	RUS	Andrei Sekretov (on loan to Gazovik Orenburg)
33	MF	CRO	Josip Knežević (on loan to (Kazakhstan) Kairat)
37	DF	RUS	Kirill Moryganov (to Oktan Perm)
39	FW	UKR	Ilya Mikhalyov (to (Ukraine) Karpaty Lviv)
45	MF	RUS	Aleksei Skvortsov
48	MF	RUS	Nikita Glukhikh (released)
60	MF	RUS	Artur Valikayev (to Shinnik Yaroslavl)
78	MF	RUS	Vladimir Shpyryov (released)
88	GK	BLR	Vasil Khamutowski (released)
91	DF	RUS	Artyom Moryganov (to Oktan Perm)
98	DF	RUS	Andrey Blyndu (to (Spain) Castellón)

=== Anzhi Makhachkala ===
In: Note: Flags indicate national team as defined under FIFA eligibility rules; some limited exceptions apply. Players may hold more than one non-FIFA nationality.

No.	Pos.	Nation	Player
1	GK	RUS	Vladimir Gabulov (end of loan to CSKA Moscow)
5	MF	RUS	Georgy Gabulov (from Alania Vladikavkaz)
15	DF	RUS	Arseniy Logashov (end of loan to Fakel Voronezh)
22	DF	CGO	Christopher Samba (from (England) Blackburn Rovers)
27	MF	RUS	Oleg Shatov (from Ural Sverdlovsk Oblast)
—	MF	RUS	Dmitri Ivanov (end of loan to Dagdizel Kaspiysk)

Out: Note: Flags indicate national team as defined under FIFA eligibility rules; some limited exceptions apply. Players may hold more than one non-FIFA nationality.

No.	Pos.	Nation	Player
1	GK	GEO	Nukri Revishvili (to Krasnodar)
3	DF	BRA	Roberto Carlos (to Anzhi backroom staff)
5	DF	SEN	Ibra Kébé (released)
9	FW	BRA	Diego Tardelli (to (Qatar) Al-Gharafa)
22	MF	HUN	Balázs Dzsudzsák (to Dynamo Moscow)
24	FW	RUS	Ilya Kukharchuk (on loan to Ural Sverdlovsk Oblast)
27	FW	GEO	Giorgi Iluridze (to (Georgia (country)) Dila Gori)

=== CSKA Moscow ===
In: Note: Flags indicate national team as defined under FIFA eligibility rules; some limited exceptions apply. Players may hold more than one non-FIFA nationality.

No.	Pos.	Nation	Player
3	MF	SWE	Pontus Wernbloom (from (Netherlands) AZ)
18	MF	NGA	Ahmed Musa (from (Netherlands) VVV-Venlo)
29	MF	KOR	Kim In-Sung (from (South Korea) Gangneung City)
39	DF	RUS	Vyacheslav Karavayev
—	FW	BRA	Ricardo Jesus (end of loan to (Brazil) Ponte Preta)

Out: Note: Flags indicate national team as defined under FIFA eligibility rules; some limited exceptions apply. Players may hold more than one non-FIFA nationality.

No.	Pos.	Nation	Player
9	FW	BRA	Vágner Love (to (Brazil) Flamengo)
15	DF	NGA	Chidi Odiah (released)
23	MF	RUS	Nika Piliyev (on loan to (Slovakia) Slovan Bratislava)
30	GK	RUS	Vladimir Gabulov (end of loan from Anzhi Makhachkala)
34	DF	RUS	Aleksei Nikitin (on loan to Yenisey Krasnoyarsk)
49	MF	RUS	Aleksandr Vasilyev (on loan to Yenisey Krasnoyarsk)
58	FW	RUS	Mukhammad Sultonov (to Lokomotiv-2 Moscow)
—	DF	RUS	Andrei Vasyanovich (on loan to Dynamo Bryansk)
—	FW	RUS	Anton Zabolotny (on loan to Dynamo Bryansk)

=== Dynamo Moscow ===
In: Note: Flags indicate national team as defined under FIFA eligibility rules; some limited exceptions apply. Players may hold more than one non-FIFA nationality.

No.	Pos.	Nation	Player
11	MF	HUN	Balázs Dzsudzsák (from Anzhi Makhachkala)
18	GK	ARM	Roman Berezovsky (from Khimki)
26	MF	ECU	Christian Noboa (from Rubin Kazan)
37	MF	RUS	Sergei Terekhov (end of loan to Baltika Kaliningrad)
77	MF	RUS	Irakli Logua (end of loan to Fakel Voronezh)
99	FW	RUS	Aleksandr Bebikh (end of loan to Dynamo Stavropol)

Out: Note: Flags indicate national team as defined under FIFA eligibility rules; some limited exceptions apply. Players may hold more than one non-FIFA nationality.

No.	Pos.	Nation	Player
3	DF	RUS	Boris Rotenberg (on loan to Kuban Krasnodar)
7	MF	RUS	Andrei Karyaka (to Volga Nizhny Novgorod)
17	MF	RUS	Alan Gatagov (on loan to Tom Tomsk)
18	MF	CRO	Tomislav Dujmović (on loan to (Spain) Real Zaragoza)
25	DF	RUS	Denis Kolodin (on loan to Rostov)
57	MF	RUS	Denis Rykhovskiy (released)
75	GK	RUS	Ivan Shubkin (released)
78	MF	RUS	Vladimir Shpyryov (to Kaluga)
80	MF	SRB	Marko Jevtovic (released)
89	FW	RUS	Yevgeni Kuklin (released)
99	FW	RUS	Timur Kalimzhanov (released)
—	DF	RUS	Nikita Chicherin (to Volga Nizhny Novgorod, previously on loan to Sibir Novosibirsk)
—	DF	RUS	Anton Rudakov (on loan to Rusichi Oryol, previously on loan to Dynamo Stavropol)
—	MF	RUS	Yuri Kirillov (on loan to Ural Sverdlovsk Oblast, previously on loan to Krylia Sovetov Samara)
—	MF	RUS	Viktor Svezhov (to Krylia Sovetov Samara, previously on loan to Luch-Energiya Vladivostok)

=== FC Krasnodar ===
In: Note: Flags indicate national team as defined under FIFA eligibility rules; some limited exceptions apply. Players may hold more than one non-FIFA nationality.

No.	Pos.	Nation	Player
17	MF	RUS	Pavel Golyshev (from Tom Tomsk)
20	MF	MDA	Igor Lambarschi (from (Moldova) Academia UTM)
29	GK	GEO	Nukri Revishvili (from Anzhi Makhachkala)
31	MF	MDA	Valeriu Ciupercă (from (Moldova) Academia UTM)
33	MF	RUS	Khasan Akhriyev (from Zhemchuzhina Sochi)
38	FW	RUS	Maksim Seryogin
40	MF	RUS	Igor Yermakov
49	MF	RUS	Maksim Yermakov
53	MF	RUS	Pavel Marushko
57	DF	RUS	Ramil Zyabirov
61	GK	RUS	Aleksandr Afonin (joined in September 2011, released in January 2012)
62	MF	RUS	Yevgeni Vyalkov
63	FW	RUS	Nikolay Komlichenko
64	DF	RUS	Oleg Logunov
67	DF	RUS	Oleg Mikhaylov
68	MF	RUS	Dmitri Pavlenko
69	DF	RUS	Artur Farion
72	FW	RUS	Aleksey Mayer

Out: Note: Flags indicate national team as defined under FIFA eligibility rules; some limited exceptions apply. Players may hold more than one non-FIFA nationality.

No.	Pos.	Nation	Player
11	FW	RUS	Spartak Gogniyev (to Ural Sverdlovsk Oblast)
13	DF	RUS	Fyodor Kudryashov (end of loan from Spartak Moscow)
16	GK	RUS	Denis Pchelintsev (on loan to Baltika)
17	DF	RUS	Artyom Yankovskiy (to Mostovik-Primorye Ussuriysk)
20	MF	RUS	Yakov Zayka (to Shinnik Yaroslavl)
31	MF	RUS	Artur Adamyan (released)
32	MF	RUS	Yevgeni Chernyshov (to Saturn Moscow Oblast)
34	MF	RUS	Nikita Galkin (to Rusichi Oryol)
35	FW	RUS	Aleksei Bezglasny (to Slavyansky Slavyansk-na-Kubani)
36	FW	RUS	Aleksei Zolotarenko (to Volgar-Gazprom Astrakhan)
61	GK	RUS	Aleksandr Afonin (released)
64	DF	RUS	Oleg Logunov (released)
71	MF	POR	Rui Miguel (to (Romania) Astra Ploiești)
77	MF	RUS	Andriano Kokoskeriya (released)
94	DF	RUS	Maksim Pichugin (to MITOS Novocherkassk)

=== Krylia Sovetov Samara ===
In: Note: Flags indicate national team as defined under FIFA eligibility rules; some limited exceptions apply. Players may hold more than one non-FIFA nationality.

No.	Pos.	Nation	Player
13	MF	BLR	Alexander Hleb (from (Spain) Barcelona)
21	DF	RUS	Dmitri Golubev (from Akademiya Togliatti)
28	FW	RUS	Yevgeni Galaktionov
29	MF	RUS	Fyodor Aleksenko
34	MF	RUS	Pavel Seminyaka
35	GK	RUS	Denis Vavilin (from KAMAZ Naberezhnye Chelny)
51	MF	RUS	Viktor Svezhov (from Dynamo Moscow)
81	DF	BLR	Dmitry Verkhovtsov (from (Belarus) Naftan Novopolotsk)
99	FW	COD	Joël Tshibamba (on loan from (Greece) AEL)

Out: Note: Flags indicate national team as defined under FIFA eligibility rules; some limited exceptions apply. Players may hold more than one non-FIFA nationality.

No.	Pos.	Nation	Player
1	GK	RUS	David Yurchenko (to Mordovia Saransk)
2	DF	RUS	Basel Abdoulfattakh (on loan to Yenisey Krasnoyarsk)
10	MF	RUS	Sergey Kuznetsov (to Mordovia Saransk)
11	MF	RUS	Anton Sosnin (to Kuban Krasnodar)
14	MF	RUS	Yuri Kirillov (end of loan from Dynamo Moscow)
15	DF	RUS	Sergei Ponomarenko (released)
17	MF	BLR	Dzyanis Kowba (to (Ukraine) Oleksandria)
23	FW	BUL	Dimitar Makriev (to (Ukraine) Oleksandria)
33	FW	RUS	Roman Kasyanov (to Nosta Novotroitsk)
39	FW	RUS	Aleksei Popov (released)
43	MF	RUS	Dmitri Kostyayev (released)
44	MF	RUS	Aleksandr Budanov (released)
47	MF	RUS	Aleksei Khrushchyov (to Syzran-2003 Syzran)
52	DF	BUL	Viktor Genev (end of loan from (Bulgaria) Slavia Sofia)
75	DF	RUS	Pavel Novitskiy (released)
77	MF	SVN	Nejc Pečnik (end of loan from (Portugal) Nacional)
79	DF	SRB	Nenad Đorđević (released)
88	MF	COL	Juan Carlos Escobar (to (Colombia) Deportes Tolima)

=== Kuban Krasnodar ===
In: Note: Flags indicate national team as defined under FIFA eligibility rules; some limited exceptions apply. Players may hold more than one non-FIFA nationality.

No.	Pos.	Nation	Player
4	DF	RUS	Boris Rotenberg (on loan from Dynamo Moscow)
14	MF	RUS	Aleksei Ionov (from Zenit Saint Petersburg)
22	MF	RUS	Anton Sosnin (from Krylia Sovetov Samara)
30	FW	ARM	Marcos Pizzelli (from (Ukraine) Metalurh Donetsk)
45	MF	RUS	Sergei Zozulya
46	MF	RUS	Giorg Ubilava
72	DF	RUS	Maksim Pereverzev
73	MF	RUS	Sergei Arzumanov
77	MF	RUS	Levon Konoplyov
—	GK	MDA	Stanislav Namaşco (end of loan to Spartak Nalchik)
—	MF	UKR	Dmitriy Gorbushin (end of loan to Chernomorets Novorossiysk)

Out: Note: Flags indicate national team as defined under FIFA eligibility rules; some limited exceptions apply. Players may hold more than one non-FIFA nationality.

No.	Pos.	Nation	Player
5	DF	RUS	Sergei Bendz (on loan to Volga Nizhny Novgorod)
10	FW	RUS	Sergei Davydov (to Rubin Kazan)
28	MF	SVK	František Kubík (to (Ukraine) Tavriya Simferopol)
30	MF	CIV	Marco Né (to (Ukraine) Tavriya Simferopol)
40	MF	ROU	Dacian Varga (end of loan from (Romania) Sportul Studențesc)
45	MF	RUS	Aleksandr Karibov (to Torpedo Armavir)
72	DF	RUS	Maksim Kovalchuk (released)
73	MF	RUS	Yevgeni Kurdus (to Torpedo Armavir)
98	GK	RUS	Aleksandr Budakov (to Spartak Nalchik)
99	MF	RUS	Vladislav Ryzhkov (released)
—	DF	RUS	Azat Bairyyev (to Alania Vladikavkaz, previously on loan to Dynamo Bryansk)

=== Lokomotiv Moscow ===
In: Note: Flags indicate national team as defined under FIFA eligibility rules; some limited exceptions apply. Players may hold more than one non-FIFA nationality.

No.	Pos.	Nation	Player
3	DF	RUS	Aleksandr Yarkovoy (free agent, last team (Russia) Lokomotiv-2 Moscow)
6	MF	RUS	Maksim Grigoryev (from MITOS Novocherkassk)
15	FW	RUS	Roman Pavlyuchenko (from (England) Tottenham Hotspur)
26	MF	BLR	Yan Tsiharow (from Tom Tomsk)
30	FW	RUS	Arshak Koryan
32	FW	RUS	Mikhail Petrusyov (from Dnepr Smolensk)
44	MF	RUS	Aleksei Gorshkov
47	MF	RUS	Nikita Salamatov
50	DF	RUS	Andrey Yeshchenko (from Volga Nizhny Novgorod)
51	DF	RUS	Maksim Belyayev (end of loan to Torpedo Vladimir)
67	DF	RUS	Temur Mustafin (from Rostov)
72	FW	RUS	Kamil Mullin
87	DF	RUS	Vladimir Smirnov
—	GK	BLR	Artem Gomelko (end of loan to (Belarus) Torpedo-BelAZ)
—	MF	RUS	Semyon Fomin (end of loan to Spartak Nalchik)

Out: Note: Flags indicate national team as defined under FIFA eligibility rules; some limited exceptions apply. Players may hold more than one non-FIFA nationality.

No.	Pos.	Nation	Player
17	FW	RUS	Aleksandr Marenich (released)
20	DF	SVN	Branko Ilič (released)
24	DF	RUS	Andrei Ivanov (on loan to Tom Tomsk)
30	DF	RUS	Vitali Dyakov (to Rostov)
39	DF	RUS	Kirill Pavlov (on loan to Metallurg-Kuzbass Novokuznetsk)
44	DF	RUS	Mikhail Borisov (to MITOS Novocherkassk)
45	FW	RUS	Aleksandr Minchenkov (on loan to Mordovia Saransk)
56	FW	RUS	Georgi Nurov (to Rubin Kazan)
62	MF	RUS	Roman Bykov (to Shinnik Yaroslavl)
71	DF	RUS	Aleksei Mamonov (to Amkar Perm)
73	MF	RUS	Azret Omarov (released)
83	MF	RUS	Aleksei Malkov (released)
96	FW	RUS	Dmitry Poloz (to Rostov)
—	MF	BRA	Charles (released, previously on loan to (Brazil) Cruzeiro)
—	DF	BRA	Rodolfo (to (Brazil) Vasco da Gama, previously on loan to (Brazil) Grêmio)
—	FW	SEN	Djiby Fall (to (Belgium) Lokeren, previously on loan to (Denmark) OB)
—	MF	RUS	Igor Smolnikov (to Rostov, previously on loan)

=== FC Rostov ===
In: Note: Flags indicate national team as defined under FIFA eligibility rules; some limited exceptions apply. Players may hold more than one non-FIFA nationality.

No.	Pos.	Nation	Player
23	FW	RUS	Dmitry Poloz (from Lokomotiv Moscow)
24	DF	RUS	Denis Kolodin (on loan from Dynamo Moscow)
29	MF	RUS	Andrei Vasilyev (from Zenit St. Petersburg)
52	DF	RUS	Aleksandr Tundenkov
53	DF	RUS	Dmitri Chistyakov
54	MF	RUS	Sergei Mikhailov
56	MF	RUS	Vitali Ivanov
57	DF	RUS	Ivan Terentyev
58	MF	RUS	Dmitri Kartashov
59	MF	RUS	Artyom Eskov
62	GK	RUS	Vladislav Suslov
89	DF	RUS	Vitali Dyakov (from Lokomotiv Moscow)
97	GK	RUS	Sergei Pesyakov (on loan from Spartak Moscow)

Out: Note: Flags indicate national team as defined under FIFA eligibility rules; some limited exceptions apply. Players may hold more than one non-FIFA nationality.

No.	Pos.	Nation	Player
5	DF	RUS	Aleksandr Khokhlov (released)
8	MF	BUL	Chavdar Yankov (end of loan from (Ukraine) Metalurh Donetsk)
13	MF	RUS	Aleksei Rebko (to Tom Tomsk)
14	DF	RUS	Anri Khagush (end of loan from Rubin Kazan)
17	FW	RUS	Maksim Grigoryev (end of loan from MITOS Novocherkassk)
20	DF	TUN	Anis Boussaidi (to (Ukraine) Tavriya Simferopol)
30	GK	RUS	Anton Kochenkov (end of loan from Volga Nizhny Novgorod)
31	GK	RUS	Aleksandr Solovyov (on loan to MITOS Novocherkassk)
33	MF	RUS	Dmitri Malyaka (end of loan from MITOS Novocherkassk)
38	MF	RUS	Karlen Vartanyan (to Taganrog)
40	DF	RUS	Dmitri Dolya (released)
46	MF	RUS	Aleksei Ryabokon (released)
49	MF	RUS	Nikita Vasilyev (on loan to Chernomorets Novorossiysk)
50	DF	RUS	Mikhail Martynov (released)
51	GK	RUS	Rasul Farfutdinov (to Podolye Podolsky district)
55	MF	RUS	Sergei Tumasyan (released)
63	MF	RUS	Temur Mustafin (to Lokomotiv Moscow)
69	MF	RUS	Yevgeni Filippov (end of loan from MITOS Novocherkassk)
77	DF	UKR	Andriy Proshyn (to Sibir Novosibirsk)
90	DF	RUS	Artyom Kulesha (end of loan from Rubin Kazan)
91	DF	RUS	Alan Bagayev (to Alania-d Vladikavkaz)
99	MF	RUS	Oleg Ivanov (to Terek Grozny)
—	FW	RUS	Aleksei Sugak (on loan to SKA Rostov-on-Don, previously on loan to (Belarus) Neman Grodno)

=== Rubin Kazan ===
In: Note: Flags indicate national team as defined under FIFA eligibility rules; some limited exceptions apply. Players may hold more than one non-FIFA nationality.

No.	Pos.	Nation	Player
28	FW	RUS	Sergei Davydov (from Kuban Krasnodar)
30	MF	ESP	Jonatan Valle (from (Spain) Leganés)
77	MF	RUS	Nikita Bocharov (from Zenit Saint Petersburg)
88	GK	IRN	Alireza Haghighi (from (Iran) Persepolis Tehran)
97	FW	RUS	Georgi Nurov (from Lokomotiv Moscow)
—	MF	RUS	Artyom Kulesha (end of loan to Rostov)

Out: Note: Flags indicate national team as defined under FIFA eligibility rules; some limited exceptions apply. Players may hold more than one non-FIFA nationality.

No.	Pos.	Nation	Player
11	FW	RUS	Igor Lebedenko (to Terek Grozny)
14	FW	ECU	Walter Chalá (on loan to (Ecuador) Cuenca)
16	MF	ECU	Christian Noboa (to Dynamo Moscow)
26	FW	RUS	Aleksei Medvedev (to Sibir Novosibirsk)
64	MF	GEO	Giorgi Chelebadze (released)
65	MF	RUS	Maksim Zhestokov (on loan to KAMAZ Naberezhnye Chelny)
85	MF	RUS	Marat Sitdikov (to Neftekhimik Nizhnekamsk)
—	GK	MDA	Ilie Cebanu (on loan to Tom Tomsk, previously on loan to Volgar-Gazprom Astrakhan)
—	DF	ESP	Jordi (to (Belgium) Club Brugge, previously on loan at (Spain) Rayo Vallecano)
—	DF	RUS	Anri Khagush (to Spartak Nalchik, previously on loan to Rostov)
—	DF	RUS	Anton Piskunov (on loan to KAMAZ Naberezhnye Chelny)
—	FW	RUS	Igor Portnyagin (on loan to Tom Tomsk, previously on loan to Spartak Nalchik)

=== Spartak Moscow ===
In: Note: Flags indicate national team as defined under FIFA eligibility rules; some limited exceptions apply. Players may hold more than one non-FIFA nationality.

No.	Pos.	Nation	Player
13	DF	RUS	Fyodor Kudryashov (end of loan to Krasnodar)
25	MF	RUS	Diniyar Bilyaletdinov (from (England) Everton)
46	FW	BLR	Dmitri Khlebosolov (end of loan to (Belarus) Naftan Novopolotsk)
75	MF	RUS	Andrei Svyatov
77	MF	RUS	Soslan Gatagov (free agent, last team Lokomotiv Moscow)
78	MF	RUS	Aydar Lisinkov
80	MF	RUS	Artyom Timofeyev
—	DF	BLR	Egor Filipenko (end of loan to (Belarus) BATE)
—	MF	RUS	Artur Maloyan (end of loan to Dynamo Bryansk)

Out: Note: Flags indicate national team as defined under FIFA eligibility rules; some limited exceptions apply. Players may hold more than one non-FIFA nationality.

No.	Pos.	Nation	Player
4	MF	RUS	Emin Makhmudov (on loan to Tom Tomsk)
18	MF	CRO	Filip Ozobić (on loan to (Croatia) Hajduk Split)
90	MF	RUS	Andrey Tikhonov (retired)
—	GK	RUS	Sergei Pesyakov (on loan to Rostov, previously on loan to Tom Tomsk)
—	MF	RUS	Artur Valikayev (to Shinnik Yaroslavl, previously on loan to Amkar Perm)

=== Spartak Nalchik ===
In: Note: Flags indicate national team as defined under FIFA eligibility rules; some limited exceptions apply. Players may hold more than one non-FIFA nationality.

No.	Pos.	Nation	Player
14	DF	RUS	Anri Khagush (from Rubin Kazan)
15	DF	ARM	Hrayr Mkoyan (from (Armenia) Mika)
21	MF	MDA	Eugeniu Cebotaru (from (Romania) Ceahlăul)
25	MF	RUS	Rustam Balov (from Chernomorets Novorossiysk)
27	FW	COL	Daniel Buitrago (on loan from (Latvia) Spartaks Jūrmala)
61	DF	RUS	Andrei Atazhukin
62	DF	RUS	Martin Ashinov
63	FW	RUS	Aslan Zhemukhov
64	DF	RUS	Marat Berezgov
98	GK	RUS	Aleksandr Budakov (from Kuban Krasnodar)
—	GK	RUS	Anton Antipov (end of loan to Mashuk-KMV Pyatigorsk)

Out: Note: Flags indicate national team as defined under FIFA eligibility rules; some limited exceptions apply. Players may hold more than one non-FIFA nationality.

No.	Pos.	Nation	Player
2	DF	RUS	Yuri Lebedev (to Baltika Kaliningrad)
14	MF	RUS	Daniil Gridnev (to Shinnik Yaroslavl)
15	FW	RUS	Igor Portnyagin (end of loan from Rubin Kazan)
24	MF	RUS	Albert Balov (released)
27	GK	MDA	Stanislav Namaşco (end of loan from Kuban Krasnodar)
21	FW	MNE	Bogdan Milić (to (South Korea) Gwangju)
31	DF	BRA	Leandro (to (Ukraine) Arsenal Kyiv)
32	MF	RUS	Semyon Fomin (end of loan from Lokomotiv Moscow)
39	FW	ISL	Hannes Sigurðsson (to (Kazakhstan) Atyrau)
45	MF	RUS	Zalim Kanikhov (released)
47	FW	RUS	Aslan Barokov (released)
55	DF	RUS	Akhmat Chochuyev (to Kavkaztransgaz-2005 Ryzdvyany)
59	MF	RUS	Dzhashar Khubiyev (to Kavkaztransgaz-2005 Ryzdvyany)
87	FW	RUS	Nazir Kazharov (released)
99	MF	UKR	Serhiy Pylypchuk (to (Ukraine) FC Volyn Lutsk)

=== Terek Grozny ===
In: Note: Flags indicate national team as defined under FIFA eligibility rules; some limited exceptions apply. Players may hold more than one non-FIFA nationality.

No.	Pos.	Nation	Player
6	MF	BRA	Adílson (from (Brazil) Grêmio)
19	MF	RUS	Oleg Ivanov (from Rostov)
24	DF	POL	Marcin Komorowski (from (Poland) Legia Warsaw)
31	MF	POL	Maciej Rybus (from (Poland) Legia Warsaw)
55	FW	RUS	Igor Lebedenko (from Rubin Kazan)
60	MF	RUS	Akhyad Garisultanov
63	MF	RUS	Alikhan Abukhazhiyev
64	MF	RUS	Zelim Taymyskhanov
66	DF	RUS	Ilyas Demelkhanov
67	FW	RUS	Magomed Yanursayev
77	FW	RUS	Stanislav Murikhin (from Zenit St. Petersburg)

Out: Note: Flags indicate national team as defined under FIFA eligibility rules; some limited exceptions apply. Players may hold more than one non-FIFA nationality.

No.	Pos.	Nation	Player
2	DF	BLR	Syarhey Amelyanchuk (to Tom Tomsk)
20	MF	RUS	Andrei Kobenko (to Chernomorets Novorossiysk)
26	FW	BRA	Ewerthon (to (Qatar) Al Ahli)
32	DF	RUS	Mansur Soltayev (released)
35	DF	RUS	Yusup Tepishev (released)
38	FW	RUS	Salambek Elgadzhiyev (released)
47	MF	RUS	Adam Baybatyrov (released)
61	MF	RUS	Movsur Adamov (released)
63	MF	RUS	Vadim Belozyorov (released)
71	MF	RUS	Sayd-Magomed Suleymanov (released)
77	MF	RUS	Anzor Tembulatov (released)
80	MF	RUS	Islam Dzhabrailov (released)
98	DF	RUS	Batyr Umarov (released)

=== Tom Tomsk ===
In: Note: Flags indicate national team as defined under FIFA eligibility rules; some limited exceptions apply. Players may hold more than one non-FIFA nationality.

No.	Pos.	Nation	Player
5	DF	BLR	Syarhey Amelyanchuk (from Terek Grozny)
7	MF	RUS	Aleksei Rebko (from Rostov)
8	MF	RUS	Dmitri Malyaka (from MITOS Novocherkassk)
9	MF	RUS	Igor Portnyagin (on loan from Rubin Kazan)
11	MF	RUS	Alan Gatagov (on loan from Dynamo Moscow)
17	DF	RUS	Andrei Ivanov (on loan from Lokomotiv Moscow)
18	GK	CZE	Petr Vašek (from Sibir Novosibirsk)
22	DF	BUL	Plamen Nikolov (on loan from (Bulgaria) Litex Lovech)
25	FW	RUS	Anton Khazov (from Volga Nizhny Novgorod)
37	MF	RUS	Aleksandr Nikonov
41	MF	RUS	Vladislav Kudinov
54	MF	RUS	Aleksei Sakhno
55	GK	MDA	Ilie Cebanu (on loan from Rubin Kazan)
67	MF	RUS	Emin Makhmudov (on loan from Spartak Moscow)
70	MF	RUS	Yevgeni Konstantinovskiy
83	MF	RUS	Vyacheslav Larents
94	MF	RUS	Ivan Rukavitsyn
99	DF	RUS	Yevgeni Chinyayev

Out: Note: Flags indicate national team as defined under FIFA eligibility rules; some limited exceptions apply. Players may hold more than one non-FIFA nationality.

No.	Pos.	Nation	Player
5	MF	RUS	Sergei Skoblyakov (to Khimki)
7	FW	USA	Eugene Starikov (end of loan from Zenit St. Petersburg)
9	FW	RUS	Denis Laktionov (released)
10	FW	RUS	Yevgeny Savin (to Ural Sverdlovsk Oblast)
17	MF	RUS	Pavel Golyshev (to Krasnodar)
20	MF	BLR	Yan Tsiharow (to Lokomotiv Moscow)
22	DF	ROU	Ovidiu Dănănae (to (Romania) Steaua București)
30	GK	RUS	Sergei Pesyakov (end of loan from Spartak Moscow)
34	DF	RUS	Renat Sabitov (to Sibir Novosibirsk)
37	DF	SRB	Đorđe Jokić (to Dynamo Bryansk)
52	DF	RUS	Ilya Protasov (to Sibir-2 Novosibirsk)
55	MF	KOR	Kim Nam-Il (to (South Korea) Incheon United)
57	FW	RUS	Artyom Nozdrunov (released)
69	DF	RUS	Maksim Suvorov (released)
83	MF	RUS	Aleksandr Kharitonov (to Volga Nizhny Novgorod)
99	FW	RUS	Maksim Kanunnikov (end of loan from Zenit St. Petersburg)

=== Volga Nizhny Novgorod ===
In: Note: Flags indicate national team as defined under FIFA eligibility rules; some limited exceptions apply. Players may hold more than one non-FIFA nationality.

No.	Pos.	Nation	Player
5	MF	RUS	Andrei Karyaka (from Dynamo Moscow)
17	FW	SRB	Petar Jelić (free agent)
26	DF	RUS	Sergei Bendz (on loan from Kuban Krasnodar)
83	MF	RUS	Aleksandr Kharitonov (from Tom Tomsk)
89	DF	RUS	Aleksei Mamonov (from Lokomotiv Moscow)
—	DF	RUS	Maksim Zyuzin (end of loan to Sibir Novosibirsk)
—	DF	RUS	Nikita Chicherin (from Dynamo Moscow)

Out: Note: Flags indicate national team as defined under FIFA eligibility rules; some limited exceptions apply. Players may hold more than one non-FIFA nationality.

No.	Pos.	Nation	Player
4	DF	GEO	Lasha Salukvadze (to (Georgia (country)) Dila Gori)
5	MF	GEO	Zurab Arziani (to (Georgia (country)) Dila Gori)
7	MF	UZB	Sanzhar Tursunov (to Alania Vladikavkaz)
10	MF	ROU	János Székely
11	FW	GEO	Mate Vatsadze (to (Georgia (country)) Dila Gori)
13	DF	HUN	Miklós Gaál
14	MF	GEO	Gogita Gogua (to (Georgia (country)) Dinamo Tbilisi)
16	FW	RUS	Anton Khazov (to Tom Tomsk)
20	MF	ESP	Marc Crosas (to (Mexico) Santos Laguna)
50	DF	RUS	Andrey Yeshchenko (to Lokomotiv Moscow)
70	FW	AZE	Vagif Javadov (to (Azerbaijan) Qarabağ)
99	MF	GEO	Gocha Khojava (to (Georgia (country)) Dila Gori)

=== Zenit Saint Petersburg ===
In: Note: Flags indicate national team as defined under FIFA eligibility rules; some limited exceptions apply. Players may hold more than one non-FIFA nationality.

No.	Pos.	Nation	Player
19	FW	RUS	Maksim Kanunnikov (end of loan to Tom Tomsk)
29	FW	RUS	Andrei Arshavin (on loan from (England) Arsenal)
52	DF	RUS	Andrei Ivanov
53	DF	RUS	Tural Gumbatov
54	MF	RUS	Aleksandr Zakarlyuka
56	DF	RUS	Kirill Kostin
58	DF	RUS	Ilya Zuyev
58	MF	RUS	Aleksei Yegorov
61	GK	RUS	Anton Tsvetkov
62	FW	RUS	Stepan Rebenko
64	MF	RUS	Ignat Yepifanov
65	MF	RUS	Ayzer Abbasov
67	DF	RUS	Dmitri Chertishchev
69	MF	RUS	Danila Yashchuk
70	FW	RUS	Dmitri Bogayev
76	FW	RUS	Pavel Kireyenko
89	FW	RUS	Yevgeni Markov
92	FW	RUS	Aleksei Sutormin
98	FW	RUS	Vladislav Yefimov
—	FW	USA	Eugene Starikov (end of loan to Tom Tomsk)

Out: Note: Flags indicate national team as defined under FIFA eligibility rules; some limited exceptions apply. Players may hold more than one non-FIFA nationality.

No.	Pos.	Nation	Player
28	DF	DEN	Michael Lumb (on loan to (Germany) SC Freiburg)
50	DF	RUS	Igor Cheminava (on loan to Sibir Novosibirsk)
55	DF	RUS	Sergei Kostin (to Petrotrest St. Petersburg)
57	MF	RUS	Aleksei Ionov (to Kuban Krasnodar)
69	DF	RUS	Aleksandr Manyukov (to Zvezda Ryazan)
70	MF	RUS	Vyacheslav Sushkin (to Petrotrest Saint Petersburg)
73	FW	RUS	Stanislav Murikhin (to Terek Grozny)
79	DF	RUS	Artyom Deyneko
83	MF	RUS	Andrei Vasilyev (to Rostov)
92	MF	RUS	Nikita Bocharov (to Rubin Kazan)
94	MF	RUS	Aleksei Yevseyev (released)
—	DF	FRA	Sébastien Puygrenier (to (France) Nancy)
