= Dzutsev =

The following people share this Ossetian surname:

- Alan Dzutsev (footballer born 1988) (b. 1988), Ukrainian footballer
- Alan Dzutsev (footballer born 1991) (b. 1991), Russian footballer
- Konstantin Dzutsev (b. 1970), Russian former footballer and manager
- Ruslan Dzutsev (b. 1984), Russian former footballer
