= Alan Dzutsev =

Alan Dzutsev may refer to:

- Alan Dzutsev (footballer, born 1988), Ukrainian footballer
- Alan Dzutsev (footballer, born 1991), Russian footballer
