= Balov =

Balov or Balow (Bulgarian: Балов, Russian: Балов) is a Slavic male surname, its feminine counterpart is Balova or Balowa. It may refer to

- Jillian Balow (born 1970), American politician
- Larry Balow (born 1943), American politician
- Rustam Balov (born 1986), Russian football player
- Stoyan Balov (born 1960), Bulgarian wrestler
- Uroš Balow (born 1972), Serbian publisher and diplomat
