= Gabulov =

Gabulov (Russian: Габулов) is an Ossetian masculine surname, its feminine counterpart is Gabulova. It may refer to:

- Georgy Gabulov (born 1988), Russian football midfielder
- Vladimir Gabulov (born 1983), Russian football goalkeeper
