= Oleg Shatov =

Russian footballer (born 1990)

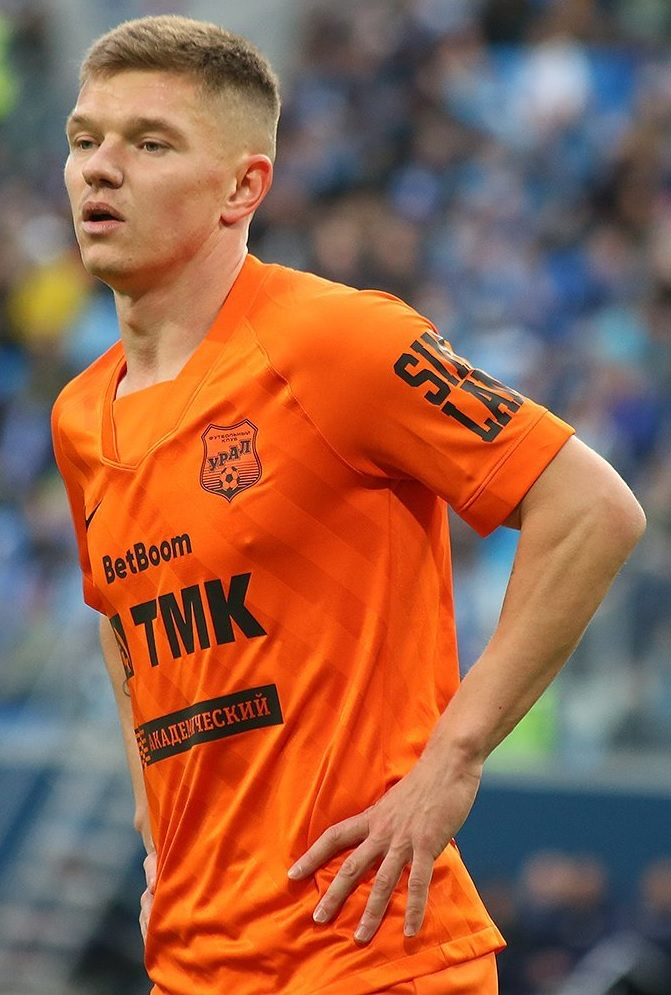
- Shatov with Ural in 2022

Personal information
- Full name: Oleg Aleksandrovich Shatov
- Date of birth: 29 July 1990 (age 36)
- Place of birth: Nizhny Tagil, Russian SFSR
- Height: 1.73 m (5 ft 8 in)
- Position: Attacking midfielder

Youth career
- –2007: DYuSSh Mega-Temp Krasnoufimsk

Senior career*
Years	Team	Apps	(Gls)
2007–2011	Ural Yekaterinburg	127	(16)
2012–2013	Anzhi Makhachkala	34	(3)
2013–2020	Zenit Saint Petersburg	139	(23)
2018	→ Krasnodar (loan)	6	(1)
2020–2021	Rubin Kazan	24	(1)
2022–2023	Ural Yekaterinburg	15	(1)

International career
2009	Russia U-19	1	(0)
2010–2013	Russia U-21	20	(3)
2013–2016	Russia	28	(2)

Managerial career
- 2024–2025: Ural Yekaterinburg (assistant)
- 2024: Ural Yekaterinburg (caretaker)
- * Club domestic league appearances and goals

Oleg Aleksandrovich Shatov (Russian: Олег Александрович Шатов; born 29 July 1990) is a Russian professional football manager and a former player who played as an attacking midfielder. Earlier in his career, he mostly played as a left winger or right winger.

== Early life ==
Shatov was born and grew up in Nizhny Tagil, where the winter conditions made playing outdoor sports very difficult. As a result, Shatov began playing futsal from the age of 14, before committing fully to association football two years later.

== Club career ==
=== Ural ===
Shatov made his professional debut in the Russian First Division in 2007 for FC Ural Sverdlovsk Oblast. He was named Ural's Player of the Year after the 2010 season.

=== Anzhi ===
Although Shatov was scouted by CSKA Moscow, he accepted an offer to join Anzhi Makhachkala during the 2011-12 winter transfer window. Upon joining Anzhi, Shatov was teammates with Roberto Carlos and Samuel Eto'o. Shatov earned his first call-up to the Russian men's national team while playing at Anzhi. At the end of Shatov's first season, the team finished in fifth place in the Russian Premier League and suffered several changes of coaches.

=== Zenit ===
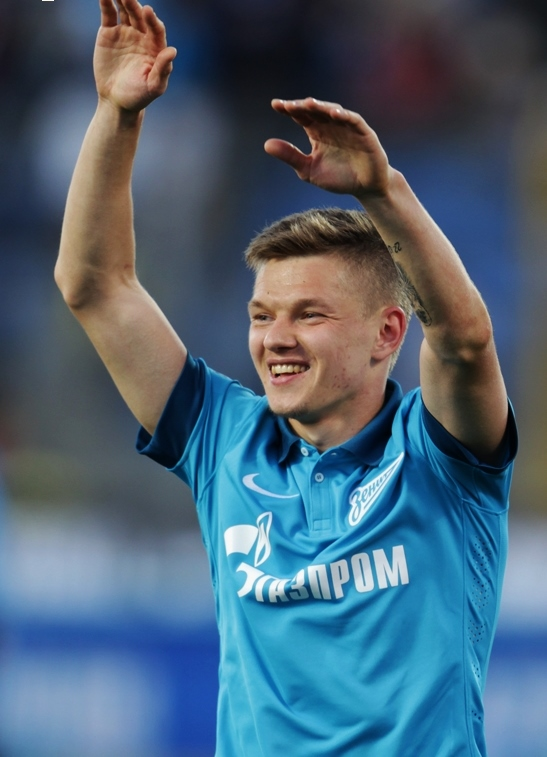
Shatov with Zenit in 2015

Shatov was signed by Zenit Saint Petersburg in the summer of 2013. During the 2015-16 season, Shatov was a regular in Zenit's Champions League campaign that season, scoring the winning goal against Gent in the group stage. Zenit was eventually eliminated by Benfica in the final 16.

Shatov left Zenit on 29 July 2020, when his contract with the club expired.

=== Krasnodar ===
On 6 February 2018, he joined FC Krasnodar on loan until the end of the 2017–18 season.

=== Rubin Kazan ===
On 29 July 2020, he signed a contract with Rubin Kazan for a term of 2 years with an additional 1-year extension option. On 18 November 2021, his contract with Rubin was terminated by mutual consent. He explained that he decided to pause his playing career due to repeating injuries and that he will reassess his situation in January 2022.

=== Return to Ural ===
Shatov resumed playing when he rejoined his first club Ural Yekaterinburg in January 2022 for the pre-season camp. On 1 February 2022, he signed a contract with Ural until the end of the 2021–22 season. Shatov extended his contract for the 2022–23 season on 16 June 2022. On 10 August 2023, Ural announced that Shatov cancelled his contract to pursue an education as a coach.

== International career ==
After receiving a call up by coach Fabio Capello, Shatov scored a goal in his debut for Russia, in a friendly match against Iceland which Russia won 2-0.

Oleg Shatov gained international prominence on 9 December 2015, when Vasily Utkin commenting in sleep or in waking a UEFA Champions League match between Bayer Leverkusen and Barcelona dreamed that Shatov seemed to be longing to return the ball possession on the 37th minute and eventually smashed the face of the local deputy.

On 2 June 2014, he was included in the Russia's 2014 FIFA World Cup squad.

== Coaching career ==
On 6 November 2024, Shatov was appointed caretaker manager of Ural Yekaterinburg after the dismissal of Yevgeni Averyanov. As Shatov does not hold UEFA license that is mandatory for the position, his assistant Sergei Tomarov was officially registered with the league as Ural's manager.

== Career statistics ==
As of 27 November 2022

Club	Season	League			Cup		Continental		Other		Total	
Club	Season	Division	Apps	Goals	Apps	Goals	Apps	Goals	Apps	Goals	Apps	Goals
Ural Yekaterinburg	2007	FNL	8	2	–		–		–		8	2
Ural Yekaterinburg	2008	FNL	26	1	2	0	–		–		28	1
Ural Yekaterinburg	2009	FNL	28	2	3	0	–		–		31	2
Ural Yekaterinburg	2010	FNL	35	4	1	0	–		–		36	4
Ural Yekaterinburg	2011–12	FNL	30	7	2	0	–		–		32	7
Anzhi Makhachkala	2011–12	RPL	8	0	–		–		–		8	0
Anzhi Makhachkala	2012–13	RPL	24	3	3	0	14 (Note: Appearances in the UEFA Europa League)	2	–		41	5
Anzhi Makhachkala	2013–14	RPL	2	0	–		–		–		2	0
Anzhi Makhachkala	Total		34	3	3	0	14	2	0	0	51	5
Zenit St. Petersburg	2013–14	RPL	22	4	1	0	7 (Note: Appearances in the UEFA Champions League)	1	–		30	5
Zenit St. Petersburg	2014–15	RPL	28	4	2	1	16 (Note: Ten appearances, one goal in the UEFA Champions League, six appearances in the UEFA Europa League)	1	–		46	6
Zenit St. Petersburg	2015–16	RPL	27	8	3	0	7	2	1 (Note: Appearances in the Russian Super Cup)	0	38	10
Zenit St. Petersburg	2016–17	RPL	18	2	2	1	4	1	1	0	25	4
Zenit St. Petersburg	2017–18	RPL	13	0	0	0	3	0	–		16	0
Zenit St. Petersburg	2018–19	RPL	19	3	1	0	7	0	–		27	3
Zenit St. Petersburg	2019–20	RPL	12	2	4	1	4	0	–		20	3
Zenit St. Petersburg	Total		139	23	13	3	48	5	2	0	202	31
Krasnodar (loan)	2017–18	RPL	6	1	–		–		–		6	1
Rubin Kazan	2020–21	RPL	21	1	0	0	–		–		21	1
Rubin Kazan	2021–22	RPL	3	0	–		1 (Note: Appearance in the UEFA Europa Conference League)	0	–		4	0
Rubin Kazan	Total		24	1	0	0	1	0	0	0	25	1
Ural Yekaterinburg	2021–22	RPL	11	1	–		–		–		11	1
Ural Yekaterinburg	2022–23	RPL	4	0	1	0	–		–		5	0
Ural Yekaterinburg	Total		142	17	9	0	0	0	0	0	151	17
Career total			345	45	25	3	63	7	2	0	435	55

=== International goals ===
Scores and results list Russia's goal tally first.

#	Date	Venue	Opponent	Score	Result	Competition
1.	6 January 2013	Estadio Municipal de Marbella, Marbella, Spain	Iceland	0–2	0–2	Friendly
2.	31 May 2014	Ullevål Stadion, Oslo, Norway	Norway	0–1	1–1	Friendly

== Honours ==
Anzhi

- Russian Cup: 2013 Runner Up

Zenit Saint Petersburg

- Russian Football Premier League: 2014–15, 2018–19, 2019–20
- Russian Cup: 2016, 2019–20
- Russian Super Cup: 2015, 2016
