= Ibrahim Gnanou =

Burkinabé footballer

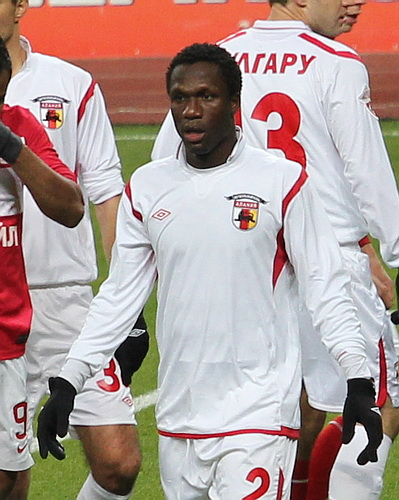

Personal information
- Full name: Ibrahim Gnanou
- Date of birth: 8 November 1986 (age 39)
- Place of birth: Ouagadougou, Burkina Faso
- Height: 1.86 m (6 ft 1 in)
- Position: Center back

Youth career
- 1999–2002: ASFA Yennega

Senior career*
| Years | Team | Apps | (Gls) |
| 2004–2005 | ASFA Yennega | 43 | (7) |
| 2005–2007 | Sheriff Tiraspol | 53 | (11) |
| 2008 | Midtjylland | 1 | (0) |
| 2009–2012 | Alania Vladikavkaz | 66 | (8) |
| 2013 | Santos Ouagadougou | | |
| 2013–2014 | Mounana | | |
| 2016–2017 | Rahimo | | |

International career
| 2003–2007 | Burkina Faso U-21 | 7 | (2) |
| 2004–2013 | Burkina Faso | 22 | (0) |
- * Club domestic league appearances and goals

Ibrahim Gnanou (born 8 November 1986) is a retired Burkinabé football defender. Although primarily a centre back, he is also able to play full back on either side.

== Career ==
Gnanou began his career with ASFA Yennega and was scouted from Sheriff Tiraspol in January 2005. He is a very good header and he scored 18 goals in 86 matches for Sheriff. Gnanou was than transferred from Sheriff Tiraspol in Moldova to FC Midtjylland in Denmark in January 2008. In February 2009 left Denmark after one year and signed for FC Alania Vladikavkaz.
