= Damir Sadikov =

Russian footballer

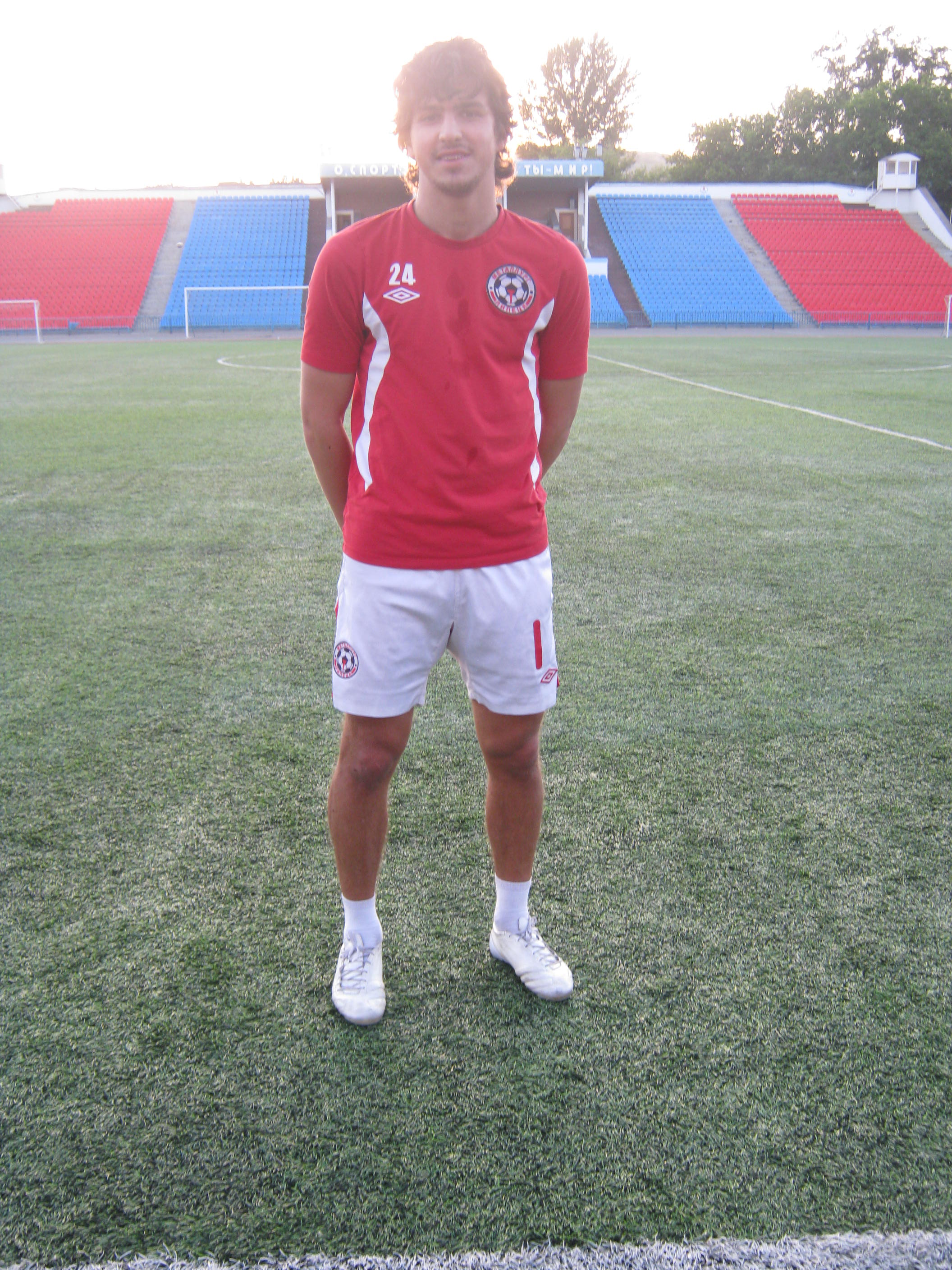

Personal information
- Full name: Damir Maratovich Sadikov
- Date of birth: 12 July 1991 (age 35)
- Place of birth: Moscow, Russian SFSR
- Height: 1.79 m (5 ft 10 in)
- Position: Forward

Youth career
- FC Spartak Moscow

Senior career*
Years	Team	Apps	(Gls)
2009–2010	FC Amkar Perm	4	(0)
2010	→ FC Tyumen (loan)	9	(3)
2011–2014	FC Metallurg Lipetsk	105	(15)
2015–2016	FC Kolomna	37	(5)
2017	FC Ararat-2 Moscow		
2017	FC Prialit Reutov		
- * Club domestic league appearances and goals

Damir Maratovich Sadikov (Russian: Дамир Маратович Садиков; born 12 July 1991) is a Russian former professional football player.

== Club career ==
He made his debut in the Russian Premier League on 26 March 2010 for FC Amkar Perm.
