= Aleksandr Arsoyev =

Russian footballer

Personal information
- Full name: Aleksandr Vyacheslavovich Arsoyev
- Date of birth: 14 June 1990 (age 36)
- Place of birth: Tskhinvali, Georgian SSR
- Height: 1.77 m (5 ft 9 1/2 in)
- Position: Midfielder

Youth career
- 2007: FC Dynamo Moscow

Senior career*
Years	Team	Apps	(Gls)
2009–2010	FC Alania Vladikavkaz	5	(0)
2011	FC Alania-d Vladikavkaz	9	(0)
2011–2012	FC FAYUR Beslan	11	(1)
2012–2013	FC Olimpia Bălți	4	(0)
2014	FC Afips-2 Afipsky		
- * Club domestic league appearances and goals

Aleksandr Vyacheslavovich Arsoyev (Russian: Александр Вячеславович Арсоев; born 14 June 1990) is a former Russian professional football player.

== Club career ==
He made his Russian Football National League debut for FC Alania Vladikavkaz on 28 August 2009 in a game against FC Sibir Novosibirsk.
