= Babajide Collins Babatunde =

Nigerian footballer (born 1988)

Baba Collins
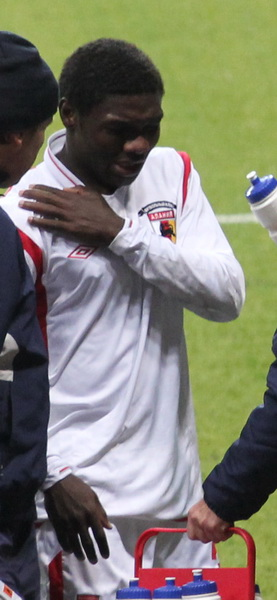

Personal information
- Full name: Babajide Collins Babatunde
- Date of birth: 2 December 1988 (age 37)
- Place of birth: Lagos, Nigeria
- Height: 1.75 m (5 ft 9 in)
- Position: Forward

Youth career
- Ebedei
- 2006–2007: Midtjylland

Senior career*
Years	Team	Apps	(Gls)
2007–2012	Midtjylland	59	(11)
2009	→ Vejle (loan)	12	(2)
2010	→ Alania Vladikavkaz (loan)	10	(1)
2011	→ Dacia Chişinău (loan)	10	(1)
2011	→ Ordabasy (loan)	11	(1)
2012–2013	Ordabasy	31	(1)
Total		133	(17)
- * Club domestic league appearances and goals

Babajide "Baba" Collins Babatunde (born 2 December 1988) is a Nigerian former professional footballer who played as a forward.

== Career ==
Collins began his career by FC Ebedei played there between 2006, joined then to Ikast FS. Collins played there in their reserve and was 2007 scouted from FC Midtjylland, on 15 January 2009 was loaned to Vejle Boldklub for six months also 30 June 2009.

In January 2011, Collins ended his loan deal with FC Alania Vladikavkaz to join FC Dacia Chişinău on loan.

Collins had a spell with Kazakh club Ordabasy from 2011 to 2013. He returned to Denmark when his contract expired, and trained with AC Horsens in July 2014 and lower league club Ringkøbing IF in August 2014. He himself approached Ringkøbing's coach Kim Kristensen, who had given Collins permission to train with the first team. Collins stated: "I am not desperate to get a deal in Ringkøbing. I've just heard good things about the club and now I'm trying to see it for myself. I do not play for the money anymore. I just want to play some football. If it does not work out, I may go to the United States, where my wife and child are with some friends, or I may return to Africa."
