= Vitali Chochiyev =

Russian footballer

Personal information
- Full name: Vitali Shotayevich Chochiyev
- Date of birth: 17 December 1979 (age 46)
- Place of birth: Beslan, Soviet Union
- Height: 1.79 m (5 ft 10 1/2 in)
- Position: Midfielder

Senior career*
Years	Team	Apps	(Gls)
1998	FC Iriston Vladikavkaz	15	(0)
1999–2001	FC Avtodor Vladikavkaz	76	(9)
2001–2003	FC Alania Vladikavkaz	27	(1)
2003–2006	FC KAMAZ Naberezhnye Chelny	103	(9)
2007–2008	FC Kuban Krasnodar	28	(5)
2007	→ FC Shinnik Yaroslavl (loan)	12	(0)
2009–2010	FC Alania Vladikavkaz	39	(2)
2010	FC Salyut Belgorod	11	(1)
2011–2012	Volgar-Gazprom	18	(1)

International career
2001	Russia U-21	2	(0)
- * Club domestic league appearances and goals

Vitali Shotayevich Chochiyev (Russian: Виталий Шотаевич Чочиев; born 17 December 1979) is a former Russian professional footballer.

== Club career ==
He made his debut in the Russian Premier League in 2001 for FC Alania Vladikavkaz.
