= Inal Pukhayev =

Russian footballer

Personal information
- Full name: Inal Otarovich Pukhayev
- Date of birth: 28 January 1992 (age 34)
- Place of birth: Tskhinvali, Georgia
- Height: 1.83 m (6 ft 0 in)
- Position: Midfielder

Youth career
- FC Spartak Vladikavkaz

Senior career*
| Years | Team | Apps | (Gls) |
| 2009–2010 | FC Amkar Perm | 0 | (0) |
| 2010 | FC Alania Vladikavkaz | 0 | (0) |
| 2011–2012 | FC FAYUR Beslan | 12 | (0) |
| 2012–2013 | FC Khimki | 4 | (0) |
| 2015 | FC Torpedo Kutaisi | 5 | (0) |
| 2015–2017 | FC Liakhvi Tskhinvali | 11 | (0) |
| 2017–2018 | FC Krymteplytsia Molodizhne | | |
- * Club domestic league appearances and goals

Inal Otarovich Pukhayev (Russian: Инал Отарович Пухаев; born 28 January 1992) is a Russian former football midfielder.

== Club career ==
He made his debut in the Russian Second Division for FC FAYUR Beslan on 18 April 2011 in a game against FC Biolog-Novokubansk and was sent off on his debut.

He made his Russian Football National League debut for FC Khimki on 9 July 2012 in a game against FC Volgar Astrakhan.
