= Boris Rotenberg (footballer) =

Russian-Finnish footballer (born 1986)

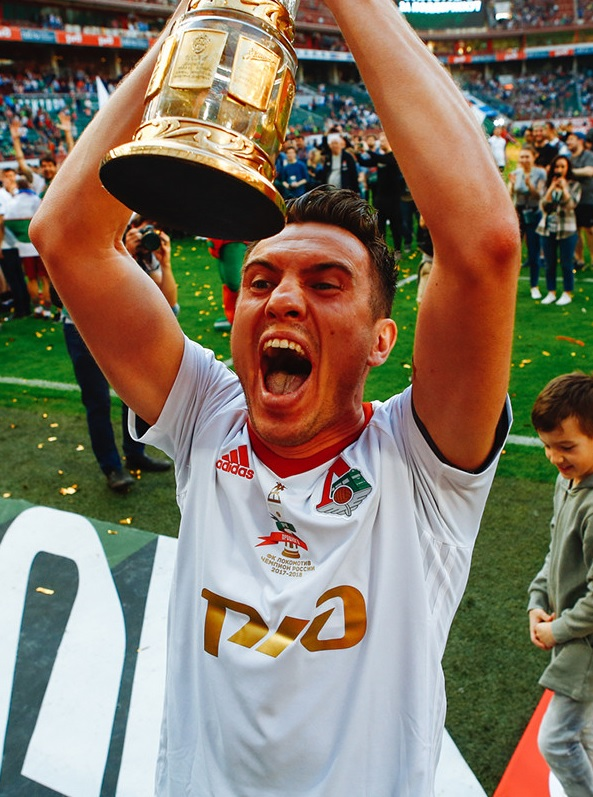
- Rotenberg with the Russian Premier League trophy in 2018

Personal information
- Full name: Boris Borisovich Rotenberg
- Date of birth: 19 May 1986 (age 40)
- Place of birth: Leningrad, Soviet Union
- Height: 1.88 m (6 ft 2 in)
- Position: Right-back

Youth career
- 2000–2002: HJK Helsinki

Senior career*
Years	Team	Apps	(Gls)
2003	Jokerit		
2004–2005	Klubi-04		
2006–2010	Zenit St. Petersburg	0	(0)
2008	→ Shinnik (loan)	1	(0)
2008	→ Saturn (loan)	0	(0)
2009	→ Khimki (loan)	13	(0)
2010	→ Alania (loan)	15	(0)
2011–2016	Dynamo Moscow	12	(0)
2012	→ Kuban Krasnodar (loan)	0	(0)
2012–2013	→ Olympiakos Nicosia (loan)	13	(0)
2015–2016	→ Rostov (loan)	15	(0)
2016–2022	Lokomotiv Moscow	10	(0)

International career
2015	Finland	1	(0)
- * Club domestic league appearances and goals

Boris Borisovich Rotenberg (Russian: Борис Борисович Ротенберг; born 19 May 1986) is a former professional footballer who played as a right-back. Born in Russia, he made one appearance for the Finland national team in 2015.

== Biography ==
His father, Boris Romanovich Rotenberg, is an oligarch who was listed by Forbes magazine as the 100th wealthiest person in Russia in 2010, with a net worth of US$700 million. His father has been a friend of the Russian president Vladimir Putin since the 1960s, when they took judo lessons together. Rotenberg's uncle Arkady Rotenberg was the 99th wealthiest in Russia, according to the same list. Entrepreneur and manager Roman Rotenberg is his brother. His maternal grandfather was a Ingrian Finn.

In July 2008, Boris Rotenberg and a fellow Jewish Russian, Yakov Ehrlich, joined the Israeli club, Hapoel Petah Tikva on trial. The club was interested in the services of both men, since they are Jewish and would not count as foreigners.

He was called up for Finland national team in June 2015, aged 29, for the first time.

In December 2018, he injured his anterior cruciate ligament.

On 7 June 2021, he extended his contract with FC Lokomotiv Moscow until 31 December 2021. On 30 December 2021, he extended it once again until the end of the 2021–22 season, despite not playing for three years at that point due to injuries. Rotenberg left Lokomotiv on 30 May 2022.

== Criticism ==
Rotenberg's footballing skills were called into question by several media outlets in Russia, whereas club officials and head coaches of Dynamo, Rostov, and Lokomotiv were accused of bowing to pressure from his wealthy and influential family, seeking at least his occasional inclusion in matchday squads of whatever team he played for. The player himself, however, had been praised for his hard work in training, as well as for keeping a low profile despite his family background.

== Career statistics ==
=== Club ===
As of match played 26 August 2018

Appearances and goals by club, season and competition
Club	Season	League			National Cup		League Cup		Continental		Other		Total	
Club	Season	Division	Apps	Goals	Apps	Goals	Apps	Goals	Apps	Goals	Apps	Goals	Apps	Goals
Zenit St.Petersburg	2006	Russian Premier League	0	0	0	0	—		—		—		0	0
Zenit St.Petersburg	2007	Russian Premier League	0	0	0	0	—		0 (Note: Appearances in the UEFA Cup)	0	—		0	0
Zenit St.Petersburg	2008	Russian Premier League	0	0	0	0	—		0 (Note: Appearances in the UEFA Champions League)	0	0 (Note: Appearances in the Russian Super Cup and UEFA Super Cup)	0	0	0
Zenit St.Petersburg	2009	Russian Premier League	0	0	0	0	—		0 (Note: Appearances in the UEFA Cup and UEFA Europa League)	0	—		0	0
Zenit St.Petersburg	2010	Russian Premier League	0	0	0	0	—		0 (Note: Appearances in the UEFA Champions League and UEFA Europa League)	0	—		0	0
Zenit St.Petersburg	2011–12	Russian Premier League	0	0	0	0	—		0	0	0 (Note: Appearances in the Russian Super Cup)	0	0	0
Zenit St.Petersburg	Total		0	0	0	0	-	-	0	0	0	0	0	0
Shinnik Yaroslavl (loan)	2008	Russian Premier League	1	0	0	0	—		—		—		1	0
Saturn Ramenskoye (loan)	2008	Russian Premier League	0	0	0	0	—		—		—		0	0
Khimki (loan)	2009	Russian Premier League	13	0	0	0	—		—		—		13	0
Alania Vladikavkaz (loan)	2010	Russian Premier League	15	0	1	0	—		—		—		16	0
Dynamo Moscow	2011–12	Russian Premier League	0	0	0	0	—		—		—		0	0
Dynamo Moscow	2012–13	Russian Premier League	0	0	0	0	—		0 (Note: Appearances in the UEFA Europa League)	0	—		0	0
Dynamo Moscow	2013–14	Russian Premier League	2	0	0	0	—		—		—		2	0
Dynamo Moscow	2014–15	Russian Premier League	10	0	1	0	—		2	0	—		13	0
Dynamo Moscow	2015–16	Russian Premier League	0	0	0	0	—		—		—		0	0
Dynamo Moscow	Total		12	0	1	0	-	-	2	0	-	-	15	0
Kuban Krasnodar (loan)	2011–12	Russian Premier League	0	0	0	0	—		—		—		0	0
Olympiakos Nicosia (loan)	2012–13	Cypriot First Division	13	0	2	0	—		—		—		15	0
Rostov (loan)	2015–16	Russian Premier League	15	0	0	0	—		—		—		15	0
Lokomotiv Moscow	2016–17	Russian Premier League	2	0	0	0	—		—		—		2	0
Lokomotiv Moscow	2017–18	Russian Premier League	7	0	1	0	—		2	0	0	0	10	0
Lokomotiv Moscow	2018–19	Russian Premier League	1	0	3	0	—		0	0	0	0	4	0
Lokomotiv Moscow	2019–20	Russian Premier League	0	0	0	0	—		0	0	0	0	0	0
Lokomotiv Moscow	2020–21	Russian Premier League	0	0	0	0	—		0	0	0	0	0	0
Lokomotiv Moscow	2021–22	Russian Premier League	0	0	0	0	—		0	0	0	0	0	0
Lokomotiv Moscow	Total		10	0	4	0	-	-	2	0	0	0	16	0
Career total			79	0	8	0	-	-	4	0	0	0	91	0

=== International ===
As of match played 9 September 2015

Appearances and goals by national team and year
National team	Year	Apps	Goals
Finland	2015	1	0
Total		1	0

== Honours ==
Lokomotiv Moscow

- Russian Premier League: 2017–18
- Russian Cup: 2016–17, 2018–19
