= Aslan Mashukov =

Russian footballer

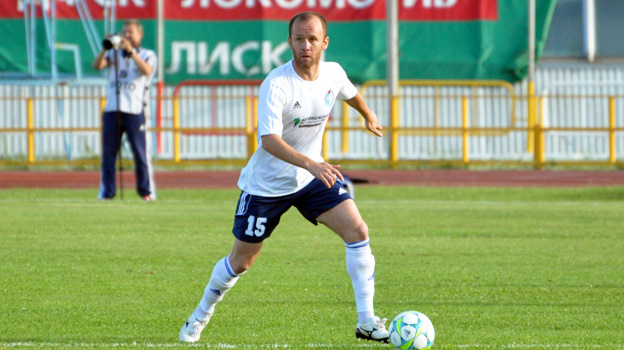

Personal information
- Full name: Aslan Vladimirovich Mashukov
- Date of birth: 4 November 1984 (age 41)
- Height: 1.80 m (5 ft 11 in)
- Position: Midfielder

Team information
- Current team: PFC Spartak Nalchik (head scout)

Youth career
- –2001: PFC Spartak Nalchik

Senior career*
| Years | Team | Apps | (Gls) |
| 2002–2009 | PFC Spartak Nalchik | 191 | (15) |
| 2010–2012 | FC Alania Vladikavkaz | 35 | (1) |
| 2012–2013 | FC Volgar Astrakhan | 23 | (0) |
| 2013 | FC Fakel Voronezh | 12 | (0) |

Managerial career
- 2014–2021: PFC Spartak Nalchik (director)
- 2021–: PFC Spartak Nalchik (head scout)
- * Club domestic league appearances and goals

Aslan Vladimirovich Mashukov (Russian: Аслан Владимирович Машуков; born 4 November 1984) is a Russian football official and a former player. He is the head scout for PFC Spartak Nalchik.
