= Nariman Gusalov =

Russian footballer

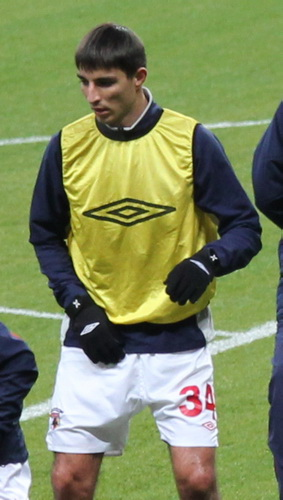

Personal information
- Full name: Nariman Yuryevich Gusalov
- Date of birth: 22 May 1990 (age 36)
- Place of birth: Ordzhonikidze, Russian SFSR
- Height: 1.92 m (6 ft 4 in)
- Positions: Midfielder; defender

Senior career*
Years	Team	Apps	(Gls)
2008	FC Alania-2 Vladikavkaz (amateur)		
2010	FC Alania Vladikavkaz	1	(0)
2011	FK Jūrmala-VV	11	(1)
2011	FC Avangard Kursk	14	(0)
2012	FC MITOS Novocherkassk	1	(0)
2013	FC Nosta Novotroitsk	10	(4)
2013–2014	FC Zvezda Ryazan	19	(3)
2016	FC Kolomna	10	(2)
2016	FC Spartak Vladikavkaz	9	(1)
2017	FC Smena Komsomolsk-na-Amure	2	(0)
- * Club domestic league appearances and goals

Nariman Yuryevich Gusalov (Russian: Нариман Юрьевич Гусалов; born 22 May 1990) is a Russian former professional football player.

== Club career ==
He previously played for FC Alania Vladikavkaz. He made his Russian Premier League debut for FC Alania Vladikavkaz on 15 October 2010 in a game against Spartak Moscow.
