= Pavel Samoylov =

Russian footballer and coach

Personal information
- Full name: Pavel Anatolyevich Samoylov
- Date of birth: 23 January 1982 (age 44)
- Place of birth: Tomsk, Russian SFSR
- Height: 1.75 m (5 ft 9 in)
- Position: Defender

Senior career*
Years	Team	Apps	(Gls)
2001–2002	FC Shakhtyor Prokopyevsk	50	(0)
2003	FC Sibiryak Bratsk	17	(0)
2004–2007	FC Sibir Novosibirsk	75	(0)
2007	FC Metallurg-Kuzbass Novokuznetsk	16	(0)
2008	FK Rīga	8	(0)
2008	FC Dynamo Barnaul	10	(0)
2009–2010	FC Gornyak Uchaly	51	(5)
2011–2013	FC Metallurg-Kuzbass Novokuznetsk	59	(0)
2013	FC Kaluga	15	(0)
2014–2015	FC Metallurg Novokuznetsk	14	(0)
2015–2016	FC Tom-2 Tomsk	16	(0)

Managerial career
- 2018–: FC Tom Tomsk (assistant coach)
- * Club domestic league appearances and goals

Pavel Anatolyevich Samoylov (Russian: Павел Анатольевич Самойлов; born 23 January 1982) is a Russian former football player and assistant coach.

== Club career ==
Samoylov played five seasons in the Russian Football National League for FC Sibir Novosibirsk, FC Metallurg-Kuzbass Novokuznetsk and FC Dynamo Barnaul.
