= Valeri Tskhovrebov =

Russian footballer

Personal information
- Full name: Valeri Georgiyevich Tskhovrebov
- Date of birth: 29 May 1989 (age 37)
- Place of birth: Sunzha, Soviet Union
- Height: 1.87 m (6 ft 1 1/2 in)
- Position: Defender

Senior career*
Years	Team	Apps	(Gls)
2009–2010	FC Alania Vladikavkaz	3	(0)
2011–2012	FC Alania-d Vladikavkaz	23	(2)
2013–2014	FC Taganrog	20	(0)
2014–2015	FC Ryazan	28	(0)
2015–2017	FC Shinnik Yaroslavl	60	(3)
2017–2018	FC Sibir Novosibirsk	32	(1)
2018–2020	FC Shinnik Yaroslavl	48	(2)
2020–2022	FC Yenisey Krasnoyarsk	38	(1)
- * Club domestic league appearances and goals

Valeri Georgiyevich Tskhovrebov (Russian: Валерий Георгиевич Цховребов; born 29 May 1989) is a Russian former professional football player.

== Club career ==
He made his Russian Football National League debut for FC Alania Vladikavkaz on 26 July 2009 in a game against FC Volgar-Gazprom Astrakhan.
