= Aslan Doguzov =

Russian professional football player

Personal information
- Full name: Aslan Semyonovich Doguzov
- Date of birth: 13 January 1991 (age 35)
- Place of birth: Vladikavkaz, Russian SFSR
- Height: 1.77 m (5 ft 9 1/2 in)
- Position: Midfielder

Senior career*
| Years | Team | Apps | (Gls) |
| 2009 | FC Avtodor Vladikavkaz | 26 | (1) |
| 2010 | FC Alania Vladikavkaz | 0 | (0) |
| 2011–2013 | FC Alania-d Vladikavkaz | 56 | (0) |
| 2013–2016 | FC Volgar Astrakhan | 36 | (0) |
| 2016 | FC Spartak Vladikavkaz | 12 | (0) |
| 2017 | FC Kuban-Holding Pavlovskaya (amateur) | | |
| 2018 | FC Spartak Vladikavkaz | 6 | (0) |
| 2019–2020 | FC Kuban-Holding Pavlovskaya (amateur) | | |
| 2020 | FC Kuban-Holding Pavlovskaya | 4 | (0) |
- * Club domestic league appearances and goals

Aslan Semyonovich Doguzov (Russian: Аслан Семёнович Догузов; born 13 January 1991) is a Russian former professional football player.

== Club career ==
He made his Russian Football National League debut for FC Volgar Astrakhan on 27 July 2014 in a game against FC Anzhi Makhachkala.
