= Karen Oganyan =

Russian footballer

Personal information
- Full name: Karen Gennadyevich Oganyan
- Date of birth: 25 June 1982 (age 44)
- Place of birth: Moscow, Soviet Union (now Russia)
- Height: 1.74 m (5 ft 8 1/2 in)
- Position: Striker

Youth career
- FC Torpedo Moscow

Senior career*
Years	Team	Apps	(Gls)
2000	FC Torpedo-2 Moscow	20	(5)
2001–2002	FC Torpedo Moscow	15	(2)
2003	FC Torpedo-Metallurg Moscow	17	(0)
2004	FC Alania Vladikavkaz	10	(0)
2005–2006	FC Metalist Kharkiv	4	(0)
2006–2010	FC KAMAZ Naberezhnye Chelny	47	(11)
2008	→ FC Zvezda Irkutsk (loan)	18	(2)
2009	→ FC Volgar-Gazprom Astrakhan (loan)	23	(6)
2010	FC Alania Vladikavkaz	10	(1)
2011	FK Jūrmala-VV	0	(0)
2011–2012	FC Luch-Energiya Vladivostok	10	(0)
- * Club domestic league appearances and goals

Karen Gennadyevich Oganyan (Russian: Карэн Геннадьевич Оганян; born 25 June 1982) is a Russian former professional footballer.

== Career ==
Oganyan made his debut in the Russian Premier League in 2001 for FC Torpedo Moscow. He has also played in the Premier League with FC Torpedo-Metallurg Moscow and FC Alania Vladikavkaz. Oganyan made four appearances for FC Metalist Kharkiv in the Ukrainian Premier League.
