= Dacosta Goore =

Ivorian footballer

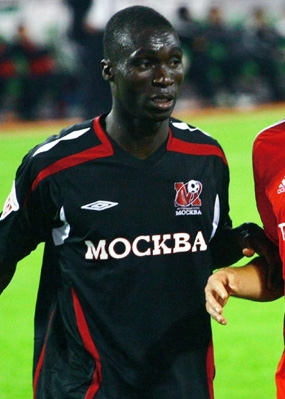
- Goore in 2009

Personal information
- Full name: Akès da Costa Goore
- Date of birth: 31 December 1984 (age 41)
- Place of birth: Ivory Coast
- Height: 1.74 m (5 ft 9 in)
- Position: Defender

Youth career
- 2002: RFC Daoukro

Senior career*
Years	Team	Apps	(Gls)
2003–2008	ASEC Mimosas		
2008	Luch-Energiya Vladivostok	15	(0)
2008–2009	Moscow	25	(0)
2010–2014	Alania Vladikavkaz	86	(0)
2015	Narva Trans	1	(0)

International career
2003	Côte d'Ivoire U-20		
- * Club domestic league appearances and goals

Akès da Costa Goore (born 31 December 1984) is an Ivorian former professional footballer who played as a defender.

== Club career ==
Goore began his career at RFC Daoukro, before moving to Ivory Coast club ASEC Mimosas in 2003. He played with ASEC Mimosas for five years.

In 2010 Goore signed a contract with Russia club FC Luch-Energia Vladivostok in January 2008. After half a year and fifteen games, he left Luch-Energia Vladivostok, and signed in August of the same year a contract with FC Moscow.

On 12 March 2015, Goore signed for Narva Trans.

== International career ==
Goore represented Ivory Coast U-20 at the 2003 FIFA World Youth Championship.

== Career statistics ==
=== Club ===
Appearances and goals by club, season and competition
Club	Season	League			National Cup		Continental		Other		Total	
Club	Season	Division	Apps	Goals	Apps	Goals	Apps	Goals	Apps	Goals	Apps	Goals
Luch-Energiya Vladivostok	2008	Russian Premier League	15	0	0	0	–		–		15	0
Moscow	2008	Russian Premier League	8	0	0	0	–		–		8	0
Moscow	2009	Russian Premier League	17	0	0	0	–		–		17	0
Moscow	Total		25	0	0	0	0	0	0	0	25	0
Alania Vladikavkaz	2010	Russian Premier League	26	0	3	0	–		–		29	0
Alania Vladikavkaz	2011–12	Russian National League	34	1	2	0	3	0	–		39	1
Alania Vladikavkaz	2012–13	Russian Premier League	10	0	0	0	–		–		10	0
Alania Vladikavkaz	2013–14	Russian National League	16	0	0	0	–		–		16	0
Alania Vladikavkaz	Total		86	1	5	0	3	0	0	0	94	1
Narva Trans	2015	Meistriliiga	1	0	0	0	–		–		1	0
Career total			127	1	5	0	3	0	0	0	135	1
