= David Gigolayev =

Russian footballer

Personal information
- Full name: David Vadimovich Gigolayev
- Date of birth: 31 March 1989 (age 37)
- Place of birth: Ordzhonikidze, Russian SFSR
- Height: 1.90 m (6 ft 3 in)
- Position: Goalkeeper

Senior career*
Years	Team	Apps	(Gls)
2006	FC Alania Oktyabrskoye		
2009	FC Alania Vladikavkaz	0	(0)
2010–2012	FC Alania Vladikavkaz	14	(0)
2013–2014	FC Alania-d Vladikavkaz	23	(0)
2014–2015	FC Alania Vladikavkaz	3	(0)
2016	PFC Berkut Armyansk		
2016–2017	FC Kafa Feodosia	19	(0)
2017–2018	FC Krymteplytsia Molodizhne	11	(0)
2018–2021	FC Druzhba Maykop	66	(0)
2021–2022	FC Mashuk-KMV Pyatigorsk	34	(0)
- * Club domestic league appearances and goals

David Vadimovich Gigolayev (Russian: Давид Вадимович Гиголаев; born 31 March 1989) is a Russian former football goalkeeper.

== Club career ==
He made his debut in the Russian Football National League for FC Alania Vladikavkaz on 24 June 2011 in a game against FC Mordovia Saransk.

== Career statistics ==
As of 1 June 2012

Club	Div	Season	League		Cup		Europe		Total	
Club	Div	Season	Apps	Goals	Apps	Goals	Apps	Goals	Apps	Goals
(Russia) Alania Vladikavkaz	D1	2010	0	0	0	0	—		0	0
(Russia) Alania Vladikavkaz	D2	2011–12	14	0	0	0	0	0	14	0
(Russia) Alania Vladikavkaz	D1	2012-13	0	0	0	0	—		0	0
(Russia) Alania Vladikavkaz	Total		14	0	0	0	0	0	14	0
Career total			14	0	0	0	0	0	14	0
