= Elbrus Tandelov =

Russian footballer (born 1982)

Personal information
- Full name: Elbrus Petrovich Tandelov
- Date of birth: 1 December 1982 (age 43)
- Place of birth: Oktyabrskoye, Russian SFSR
- Height: 1.78 m (5 ft 10 in)
- Positions: Forward; midfielder

Youth career
- FC Spartak Vladikavkaz

Senior career*
Years	Team	Apps	(Gls)
2001–2002	FC Mozdok	63	(9)
2004–2006	FC Avtodor Vladikavkaz	54	(24)
2007–2009	FC Alania Vladikavkaz	82	(9)
2010–2012	FC Mordovia Saransk	49	(1)
2013–2014	FC Taganrog	19	(4)
2014–2017	FC Ryazan	52	(17)
- * Club domestic league appearances and goals

Elbrus Petrovich Tandelov (Russian: Эльбрус Петрович Танделов; born 1 December 1982) is a former Russian professional footballer.

== Club career ==
He made his professional debut in the Russian Second Division in 2001 for FC Mozdok.

He played 5 seasons in the Russian Football National League for FC Alania Vladikavkaz and FC Mordovia Saransk.

== Honours ==
- Russian Second Division Zone South best striker: 2005.
