= Rustem Khaliullin =

Russian footballer

Personal information
- Full name: Rustem Ilshatovich Khaliullin
- Date of birth: 15 February 1987 (age 39)
- Place of birth: Brezhnev, Russian SFSR
- Height: 1.85 m (6 ft 1 in)
- Position: Defender

Senior career*
Years	Team	Apps	(Gls)
2006	FC KAMAZ Naberezhnye Chelny	0	(0)
2007	FC KAMAZ-2 Naberezhnye Chelny		
2008–2010	FC KAMAZ Naberezhnye Chelny	0	(0)
2008–2010	→ FC Gornyak Uchaly (loan)	71	(10)
2011–2013	FC Sibir Novosibirsk	37	(0)
2013	FC Baltika Kaliningrad	9	(0)
2014	FC Khimik Dzerzhinsk	7	(0)
2014	FC TSK Simferopol	16	(1)
2015	FC Saturn Ramenskoye	9	(1)
2015–2016	FC Ryazan	23	(0)
2016–2017	FC SKA Rostov-on-Don	28	(1)
2018–2019	FC Dynamo Stavropol	43	(1)
2019–2020	FC Sevastopol		
- * Club domestic league appearances and goals

Rustem Ilshatovich Khaliullin (Russian: Рустем Ильшатович Халиуллин; born 15 February 1987) is a Russian former professional football player.

== Club career ==
He participated in the 2010–11 Russian Cup run for FC Gornyak Uchaly that saw the third-division team knock out one of the top Russian teams, FC Lokomotiv Moscow and advance to the Round 16. In that round, they faced another Russian Premier League team FC Alania Vladikavkaz, the game went to penalty shootout, in which Khaliullin was the only one to miss his shot and Alania went through.

He made his Russian Football National League debut for FC Sibir Novosibirsk on 15 May 2011 in a game against FC Luch-Energiya Vladivostok.
