= Rustam Balov =

Russian footballer

Personal information
- Full name: Rustam Vladimirovich Balov
- Date of birth: 3 February 1986 (age 40)
- Height: 1.78 m (5 ft 10 in)
- Position: Midfielder

Youth career
- 1994–2000: PFC Spartak Nalchik
- 2000–2003: PFC CSKA Moscow

Senior career*
Years	Team	Apps	(Gls)
2003–2009	PFC Spartak Nalchik	56	(6)
2006	→ FC Volgar-Gazprom Astrakhan (loan)	18	(1)
2008	→ FC Metallurg Lipetsk (loan)	1	(0)
2010–2011	FC Chernomorets Novorossiysk	51	(5)
2012–2013	PFC Spartak Nalchik	15	(1)
2013–2014	FC Volgar Astrakhan	30	(2)
2014–2015	PFC Spartak Nalchik	10	(0)
- * Club domestic league appearances and goals

Rustam Vladimirovich Balov (Russian: Рустам Владимирович Балов; born 3 February 1986) is a former Russian professional footballer.

== Club career ==
He made his professional debut in the Russian First Division in 2003 for PFC Spartak Nalchik.
