= Yuri Kirillov =

Russian footballer

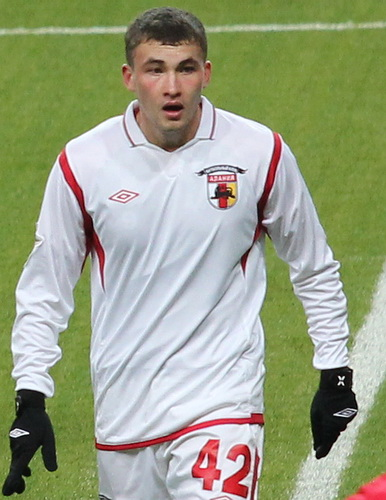
- Kirillov playing for Alania

Personal information
- Full name: Yuri Vyacheslavovich Kirillov
- Date of birth: 19 January 1990 (age 36)
- Place of birth: Ufa, Russian SFSR
- Height: 1.78 m (5 ft 10 in)
- Position: Midfielder

Team information
- Current team: Metallurg Asha

Senior career*
Years	Team	Apps	(Gls)
2007–2008	FC Sportakademklub Moscow	2	(0)
2008	→ FC Rusichi Oryol (loan)	13	(0)
2009	FC Khimki	19	(3)
2010–2013	FC Dynamo Moscow	0	(0)
2010	→ FC Alania Vladikavkaz (loan)	23	(2)
2011	→ FC Krylia Sovetov Samara (loan)	12	(0)
2012	→ FC Ural Sverdlovsk Oblast (loan)	11	(0)
2012	→ FC Ufa (loan)	9	(1)
2013	FC Ural Sverdlovsk Oblast	5	(0)
2014	FK Atlantas	8	(1)
2014–2015	FC Khimki	23	(0)
2015–2016	FC KAMAZ Naberezhnye Chelny	33	(1)
2016	FC Dynamo Saint Petersburg	5	(0)
2017	FC Olimpiyets Nizhny Novgorod	11	(0)
2018–2025	FC KAMAZ Naberezhnye Chelny	171	(6)
2025–2026	FC Murom	11	(0)
2026–	Metallurg Asha	0	(0)

International career
2009	Russia U19	6	(0)
2010	Russia U20	3	(0)
2010–2013	Russia U21	19	(1)
- * Club domestic league appearances and goals as of 13 March 2026

Yuri Vyacheslavovich Kirillov (Russian: Юрий Вячеславович Кириллов; born 19 January 1990) is a Russian professional footballer who plays for Russian Amateur Football League club Metallurg Asha.

== Career ==
Kirillov made his debut in the Russian Premier League on 3 May 2009 for FC Khimki in a game against FC Kuban Krasnodar. On 22 December 2009, FC Dynamo Moscow signed the 19-year-old midfielder from FC Khimki.
In the following seasons, Kirillov spent time on loan. In the summer 2013, he signed a permanent deal with Ural Sverdlovsk Oblast, shortly after the club returned to the Russian Football Premier League. However, after making only five appearances in the first half of the 2013-2014 season, Kirillov was released in February 2014.
