= Daniil Gridnev =

Russian footballer

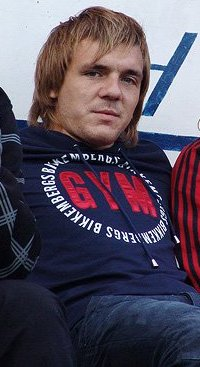

Personal information
- Full name: Daniil Anatolyevich Gridnev
- Date of birth: 2 February 1986 (age 40)
- Place of birth: Voronezh, Russian SFSR
- Height: 1.76 m (5 ft 9 in)
- Position: Midfielder

Youth career
- 1993–2004: DYuSSh Energiya Voronezh
- 2004–2005: VfB Stuttgart

Senior career*
Years	Team	Apps	(Gls)
2006	FC Fakel Voronezh	33	(1)
2007–2009	FC Anzhi Makhachkala	84	(6)
2010	FC Krylia Sovetov Samara	16	(0)
2011	PFC Spartak Nalchik	22	(1)
2012–2013	FC Shinnik Yaroslavl	29	(0)
2013	FC Volgar Astrakhan	10	(0)
2013	FC Luch-Energiya Vladivostok	19	(1)
2014	FC Neftekhimik Nizhnekamsk	11	(0)
2014–2015	FC Shinnik Yaroslavl	25	(1)
2015–2016	FC Fakel Voronezh	21	(0)
2016–2017	FC Luch-Energiya Vladivostok	28	(0)
2017–2018	FC Torpedo Moscow	24	(0)
2018–2019	FC Neftekhimik Nizhnekamsk	16	(3)
2019–2020	FC SKA Rostov-on-Don	18	(1)

International career
2006	Russia U-20	3	(1)
- * Club domestic league appearances and goals

Daniil Anatolyevich Gridnev (Russian: Даниил Анатольевич Гриднев; born 2 February 1986) is a Russian former professional footballer.

== Club career ==
He made his professional debut in the Russian First Division in 2006 for FC Fakel Voronezh.

He made his Russian Premier League debut for PFC Krylia Sovetov Samara on 27 March 2010 in a game against FC Tom Tomsk.
