= Aleksandr Marenich =

Russian footballer

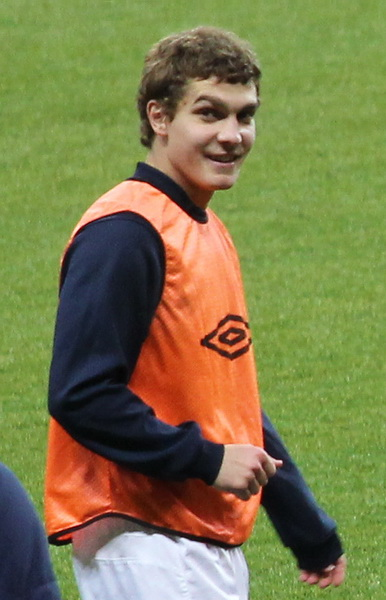

Personal information
- Full name: Aleksandr Igorevich Marenich
- Date of birth: 29 April 1989 (age 37)
- Place of birth: Zernograd, Russian SFSR
- Height: 1.74 m (5 ft 8 1/2 in)
- Positions: Left winger; forward

Senior career*
Years	Team	Apps	(Gls)
2006	FC Rostov	1	(0)
2007–2009	FC Moscow	9	(1)
2010	FC Alania Vladikavkaz	26	(4)
2011	FC Lokomotiv Moscow	0	(0)
2013	FC Ural Sverdlovsk Oblast	0	(0)
2013	FC Spartak-2 Moscow	5	(0)
2014–2015	FC Avangard Kursk	12	(1)
2015	FC SKA Rostov-on-Don	11	(0)
2016	FC Druzhba Maykop	9	(1)

International career
2005–2006	Russia U17	6	(1)
2009–2010	Russia U21	2	(0)
- * Club domestic league appearances and goals

Aleksandr Igorevich Marenich (Russian: Александр Игоревич Маренич, born 29 April 1989) is a former Russian professional footballer.

== Club career ==
He made his professional debut in the Russian Football Premier League in 2006 for FC Rostov.

== Career statistics ==
As of 10 February 2012

Club	Div	Season	League		Cup		Europe		Total	
Club	Div	Season	Apps	Goals	Apps	Goals	Apps	Goals	Apps	Goals
(Russia) FC Rostov	D1	2006	1	0	2	0	—		3	0
(Russia) FC Rostov	Total		1	0	2	0	0	0	3	0
(Russia) FC Moscow	D1	2007	0	0	0	0	0	0	0	0
(Russia) FC Moscow	D1	2008	0	0	0	0	0	0	0	0
(Russia) FC Moscow	D1	2009	9	1	3	0	—		12	1
(Russia) FC Moscow	Total		9	1	3	0	0	0	12	1
(Russia) FC Alania Vladikavkaz	D1	2010	26	4	4	0	—		30	4
(Russia) FC Alania Vladikavkaz	Total		26	4	4	0	0	0	30	4
(Russia) FC Lokomotiv Moscow	D1	2011-12	0	0	0	0	0	0	0	0
(Russia) FC Lokomotiv Moscow	Total		0	0	0	0	0	0	0	0
Career total			36	5	9	0	0	0	45	5

== International career ==
Marenich was one of the members of the Russian U-17 squad that won the 2006 UEFA U-17 Championship.
