= Alan Dzutsev (footballer, born 1988) =

Ukrainian footballer

Personal information
- Full name: Alan Feliksovych Dzutsev
- Date of birth: 24 December 1988 (age 37)
- Place of birth: Ukrainian SSR, Soviet Union
- Height: 1.90 m (6 ft 3 in)
- Position: Goalkeeper

Senior career*
Years	Team	Apps	(Gls)
2005	FC Alania Vladikavkaz	0	(0)
2006	FC Hran Buzova	1	(0)
2006–2010	FC Obolon Kyiv	13	(0)
2006–2008	FC Obolon-2 Kyiv	47	(0)
2012–2013	FC Stavropol (amateur)		
2013–2014	FC Gazprom transgaz Stavropol Ryzdvyany	5	(0)
- * Club domestic league appearances and goals as of 1 September 2014

Alan Feliksovych Dzutsev (Ukrainian: Алан Феліксович Дзуцев, born 24 December 1988) is a Ukrainian former professional football player who last played for FC Gazprom transgaz Stavropol Ryzdvyany. He also holds Russian citizenship. Dzutsev is a goalkeeper. His last match for main squad of this team he played on 20 March 2007.

In some sources he is mistaken for the other footballer, Alan Dzutsev from Russia, merging information about both.
