= Alan Dzutsev (footballer, born 1991) =

Russian footballer

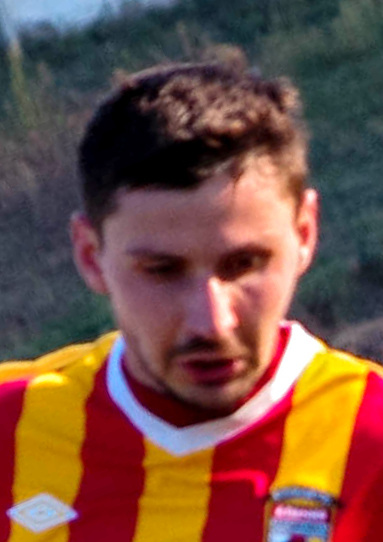
- Alan Dzutsev (2014)

Personal information
- Full name: Alan Zaurbekovich Dzutsev
- Date of birth: 24 November 1991 (age 34)
- Place of birth: Vladikavkaz, Russia
- Height: 1.85 m (6 ft 1 in)
- Position: Midfielder

Senior career*
Years	Team	Apps	(Gls)
2009–2010	FC Alania Vladikavkaz	1	(0)
2011	FC Mashuk-KMV Pyatigorsk	8	(0)
2011	FC Nizhny Novgorod	1	(0)
2012	FC Gubkin	8	(0)
2012–2013	FC Shinnik Yaroslavl	0	(0)
2014	FC Alania-d Vladikavkaz	5	(0)
2014–2015	FC Alania Vladikavkaz	9	(0)
- * Club domestic league appearances and goals

Alan Zaurbekovich Dzutsev (Russian: Алан Заурбекович Дзуцев; born 24 November 1991) is a former Russian professional football player.

== Club career ==
He made his Russian Football National League debut for FC Alania Vladikavkaz on 19 September 2009 in a game against FC Metallurg Lipetsk. He also appeared in the FNL for FC Nizhny Novgorod.

He played one game for the main squad of FC Shinnik Yaroslavl in the Russian Cup.

== Namesake ==
Sometimes, different sites mixed him with other footballer, Alan Dzutsev from Ukraine, merging information about both.
