= Georgy Gabulov =

Russian footballer

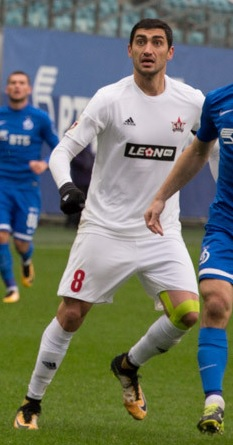
- Gabulov with SKA-Khabarovsk in 2017

Personal information
- Full name: Georgy Borisovich Gabulov
- Date of birth: 4 September 1988 (age 38)
- Place of birth: Mozdok, Soviet Union
- Height: 1.90 m (6 ft 3 in)
- Position: Midfielder

Youth career
- FC Lokomotiv Moscow

Senior career*
Years	Team	Apps	(Gls)
2006–2009	FC Lokomotiv Moscow	0	(0)
2008	→ FC Alania Vladikavkaz (loan)	14	(0)
2009	→ FC Lokomotiv-2 Moscow	27	(9)
2010–2011	FC Alania Vladikavkaz	60	(11)
2012	FC Anzhi Makhachkala	7	(1)
2013	FC Alania Vladikavkaz	25	(7)
2014	FC Rostov	8	(0)
2014–2016	FC Krylia Sovetov Samara	48	(6)
2016–2017	FC Orenburg	0	(0)
2017	FC SKA-Khabarovsk	11	(0)
2018	FC Rustavi	11	(1)

International career
2010	Russia U-21	3	(0)
2012	Russia-2	1	(0)
- * Club domestic league appearances and goals

Georgy Borisovich Gabulov (Russian: Георгий Борисович Габулов, Iron Ossetic: Гæбулты Борисы фырт Гиуæрги; born 4 September 1988) is a Russian former footballer. He played as an attacking midfielder.

== Club career ==
=== Career statistics ===
As of 8 December 2017

Club	Season	League			Cup		Continental		Other		Total	
Club	Season	Division	Apps	Goals	Apps	Goals	Apps	Goals	Apps	Goals	Apps	Goals
FC Lokomotiv Moscow	2006	Premier Liga	0	0	1	0	0	0	–		1	0
FC Lokomotiv Moscow	2007	Premier Liga	0	0	1	0	0	0	–		1	0
FC Lokomotiv Moscow	Total		0	0	2	0	0	0	0	0	2	0
FC Alania Vladikavkaz	2008	First Division	14	0	0	0	–		–		14	0
FC Lokomotiv-2 Moscow	2009	Second Division	27	9	1	0	–		–		28	9
FC Alania Vladikavkaz	2010	Premier Liga	26	4	2	0	–		–		28	4
FC Alania Vladikavkaz	2011–12	FNL	34	7	1	0	4	1	–		39	8
FC Anzhi Makhachkala	2011–12	Premier Liga	0	0	0	0	–		–		0	0
FC Anzhi Makhachkala	2012–13	Premier Liga	7	1	1	0	5	0	–		13	1
FC Anzhi Makhachkala	Total		7	1	1	0	5	0	0	0	13	1
FC Alania Vladikavkaz	2012–13	Premier Liga	3	0	0	0	–		–		3	0
FC Alania Vladikavkaz	2013–14	FNL	22	7	1	0	–		–		23	7
FC Alania Vladikavkaz	Total (3 spells)		99	18	4	0	4	1	0	0	107	19
FC Rostov	2013–14	Premier Liga	8	0	2	0	–		–		10	0
FC Rostov	2014–15	Premier Liga	0	0	0	0	–		1 (Note: One appearance in Russian Super Cup)	0	1	0
FC Rostov	Total		8	0	2	0	0	0	1	0	11	0
FC Krylia Sovetov Samara	2014–15	FNL	26	2	3	0	–		–		29	2
FC Krylia Sovetov Samara	2015–16	Premier Liga	22	4	1	0	–		–		23	4
FC Krylia Sovetov Samara	Total		48	6	4	0	0	0	0	0	52	6
FC Orenburg	2016–17	Premier Liga	0	0	0	0	–		–		0	0
FC SKA Khabarovsk	2017–18	Premier Liga	11	0	0	0	–		–		11	0
Career total			200	34	14	0	9	1	1	0	224	35

== Personal life ==
He is a younger brother of Vladimir Gabulov.

== Honours ==
=== Lokomotiv ===
- 2007: Russian Cup

=== Rostov ===
- 2013–14: Russian Cup
