= 2010 FC Tom Tomsk season =

Tom Tomsk
2010 season
- Chairman: Yury Stepanov
- Manager: Valeri Nepomniachi
- Stadium: Trud Stadium
- Russian Premier League: 8th
- Russian Cup: Round of 32 vs Krasnodar
- Top goalscorer: League: Sergei Kornilenko (11); All: Two Players (11)
- Highest home attendance: 14,500 vs Spartak Moscow; 4 April 2010 vs Zenit St.Petersburg; 17 April 2010 vs Amkar Perm; 31 October 2010
- Lowest home attendance: 8,000 vs Saturn; 16 October 2010 vs Alania Vladikavkaz; 13 November 2010
- Average home league attendance: 11,920
Home colours	Away colours	Third colours

The 2010 FC Tom Tomsk season was the 6th successive season that the club played in the Russian Premier League, the highest football league in Russia, in which they finished 8th. They also took part in the 2010–11 Russian Cup, reaching the Round of 32 where they were defeated by Krasnodar.

== Squad ==
Note: Flags indicate national team as defined under FIFA eligibility rules; some limited exceptions apply. Players may hold more than one non-FIFA nationality.

No.	Pos.	Nation	Player
2	DF	RUS	Ivan Tuyev
3	MF	RUS	Valeri Klimov
5	MF	RUS	Sergei Skoblyakov
6	MF	RUS	Dmitri Michkov
9	MF	MDA	Serghei Covalciuc
10	FW	MKD	Goran Maznov
11	MF	UKR	Kyrylo Kovalchuk
12	GK	UZB	Aleksei Poliakov
13	DF	RUS	Ilya Gultyayev
18	DF	RUS	Vladislav Khatazhenkov
20	FW	RUS	Artyom Dzyuba (loan from Spartak Moscow)
21	DF	SRB	Nikola Petković (loan from Eintracht Frankfurt)
23	DF	RUS	Georgi Dzhioyev
24	DF	RUS	Dmitri N.Smirnov
25	GK	EST	Sergei Pareiko (captain)
26	DF	RUS	Viktor Stroyev
28	DF	RUS	Konstantin Dmitriyevsky
29	DF	RUS	Nikita Konovalov
30	GK	RUS	Ivan Komissarov (loan from Spartak Moscow)
33	MF	JPN	Daisuke Matsui (loan from Grenoble)
36	DF	RUS	Fyodor Kudryashov (loan from Spartak Moscow)
37	DF	SRB	Đorđe Jokić
41	GK	RUS	Fyodor Burdykin

No.	Pos.	Nation	Player
43	FW	RUS	Roman Zharikov
44	GK	RUS	Vladimir Ageyev
50	FW	RUS	Yevgeni Koksharov
52	DF	RUS	Ilya Protasov
55	MF	KOR	Kim Nam-il
62	DF	RUS	Artur Zaks
65	MF	RUS	Oleg Sokulov
66	FW	RUS	Artyom Nozdrunov
66	MF	RUS	Dmitri Yefremov
69	DF	RUS	Maksim Suvorov
70	FW	RUS	Artyom Korotya
73	DF	RUS	Ilya Gerdt
75	MF	RUS	Viktor Svezhov (loan from Dynamo Moscow)
77	MF	RUS	Valentin Gaponov
80	MF	RUS	Yevgeni Chernov
83	MF	RUS	Aleksandr Kharitonov
87	FW	USA	Eugene Starikov (loan from Zenit St.Petersburg)
88	MF	RUS	Bobirmiza Makhmudov
90	MF	RUS	Denis Pshenichnikov
91	DF	RUS	Denis Voronov
92	DF	RUS	Artem Kochergin
93	DF	RUS	Mikhail Bashilov
99	MF	RUS	Aleksei Sazonov

== Transfers ==
=== Winter ===
In: Note: Flags indicate national team as defined under FIFA eligibility rules; some limited exceptions apply. Players may hold more than one non-FIFA nationality.

No.	Pos.	Nation	Player
9	MF	MDA	Serghei Covalciuc (from (Russia) Spartak Moscow)
14	FW	BLR	Sergei Kornilenko (on loan from (Russia) Zenit Saint Petersburg)
15	DF	RUS	Sergei Golyatkin (previously on loan at (Russia) Chernomorets Novorossiysk)
19	FW	RUS	Aleksandr Prudnikov (on loan from (Russia) Spartak Moscow)
20	FW	RUS	Artyom Dzyuba (on loan from (Russia) Spartak Moscow)
22	DF	KOR	Park Hae-Sung (from (South Korea) Incheon United)
23	DF	RUS	Georgi Dzhioyev (from (Russia) Kuban Krasnodar)
30	GK	RUS	Ivan Komissarov (on loan from (Russia) Spartak Moscow)
44	GK	RUS	Vladimir Ageyev
50	MF	RUS	Yevgeni Koksharov
55	DF	KOR	Kim Nam-il (from (Japan) Vissel Kobe)
57	FW	RUS	Artyom Nozdrunov (from (Russia) Spartak Moscow)
62	DF	RUS	Artur Zaks (from (Russia) Prialit Reutov)
65	MF	RUS	Oleg Sokulov
69	DF	RUS	Maksim Suvorov
70	FW	RUS	Artyom Korotya
73	DF	RUS	Ilya Gerdt
87	FW	USA	Eugene Starikov (on loan from (Russia) Zenit Saint Petersburg)
88	MF	RUS	Bobimirza Makhmudov
92	DF	RUS	Artyom Kochergin
99	MF	RUS	Aleksei Sazonov

Out: Note: Flags indicate national team as defined under FIFA eligibility rules; some limited exceptions apply. Players may hold more than one non-FIFA nationality.

No.	Pos.	Nation	Player
1	GK	RUS	Ivan Perfilyev (to (Russia) Khimik Dzerzhinsk)
14	FW	RUS	Artyom Dzyuba (end of loan from (Russia) Spartak Moscow)
21	DF	MDA	Valeriu Catinsus (to (Russia) Shinnik Yaroslavl)
22	FW	RUS	Vladimir Dyadyun (end of loan from (Russia) Rubin Kazan)
23	MF	SLO	Aleksandar Radosavljević (to (Greece) AEL)
24	MF	RUS	Dmitri A.Smirnov (end of loan from (Russia) Terek Grozny)
30	FW	RUS	Aleksandr Zobnin (to (Russia) Avangard Kursk)
34	DF	RUS	Dmitri Sergeyev (on loan to (Russia) Dynamo Barnaul)
35	DF	RUS	Ilya Vakhrushev (to (Russia) Radian-Baikal Irkutsk)
53	MF	RUS	Konstantin Sashilin
54	MF	RUS	Sergei Aksyonov
80	FW	RUS	Sergei Voronov (on loan to (Russia) KUZBASS Kemerovo)
89	DF	RUS	Dmitri Matviyenko (to (Russia) Radian-Baikal Irkutsk)
—	GK	RUS	Aleksei Solosin (to (Russia) Sibir Novosibirsk, previously on loan at (Russia) Ural Sverdlovsk Oblast)
—	GK	RUS	Yevgeni Gorodov (on loan to (Russia) Shinnik Yaroslavl, previously on loan at (Russia) Chita)
—	FW	RUS	Anton Arkhipov (to (Russia) Shinnik Yaroslavl, previously on loan at (Russia) Chernomorets Novorossiysk)
—	FW	RUS	Yevgeni Ponomaryov (on loan to (Russia) Radian-Baikal Irkutsk, previously on loan at (Russia) Irtysh Omsk)
—	DF	RUS	Valeri Voloshchuk (previously on loan at (Russia) Sibiryak Bratsk)
—	MF	RUS	Mikhail Vanyov (previously on loan at (Russia) Chita)

=== Summer ===
In: Note: Flags indicate national team as defined under FIFA eligibility rules; some limited exceptions apply. Players may hold more than one non-FIFA nationality.

No.	Pos.	Nation	Player
18	DF	RUS	Vladislav Khatazhyonkov (from (Russia) Spartak Nalchik)
21	DF	SRB	Nikola Petković (on loan from (Germany) Eintracht Frankfurt)
33	MF	JPN	Daisuke Matsui (on loan from (France) Grenoble)
36	DF	RUS	Fyodor Kudryashov (on loan from (Russia) Spartak Moscow)
52	MF	RUS	Ilya Protasov
75	MF	RUS	Viktor Svezhov (on loan from (Russia) Dynamo Moscow)
80	MF	RUS	Yevgeni Chernov

Out: Note: Flags indicate national team as defined under FIFA eligibility rules; some limited exceptions apply. Players may hold more than one non-FIFA nationality.

No.	Pos.	Nation	Player
1	GK	RUS	Yegor Ridosh (on loan to (Russia) Khimik Dzerzhinsk)
4	MF	RUS	Vasili Yanotovsky (to (Russia) SKA-Energiya Khabarovsk)
7	MF	RUS	Vitali Volkov (to (Russia) Volga Nizhny Novgorod)
8	FW	RUS	Denis Kiselyov (to (Russia) Volgar-Gazprom Astrakhan)
14	FW	BLR	Sergei Kornilenko (end of loan from (Russia) Zenit Saint Petersburg)
15	DF	RUS	Sergei Golyatkin (on loan to (Russia) SKA-Energiya Khabarovsk)
17	DF	RUS	Andrei Ivanov (end of loan from (Russia) Spartak Moscow)
19	FW	RUS	Aleksandr Prudnikov (end of loan from (Russia) Spartak Moscow)
49	MF	RUS	Alexey Yakimov (on loan to (Russia) Khimik Dzerzhinsk)
51	FW	RUS	Nikita Kozlov
71	MF	RUS	Roman Grokhin
81	MF	HUN	Norbert Németh (to (Hungary) Vasas)

== Competitions ==
=== Russian Premier League ===
==== Matches ====
13 March 2010 1	Rostov	0 – 2	Tom Tomsk	Rostov-on-Don
18:30 MSK (UTC+4)		Summary	Kornilenko 63', 87'	Stadium: Olimp-2; Attendance: 8,000; Referee: Aleksnadr Kolobaev

22 March 2010 2	Tom Tomsk	0 – 1	Rubin Kazan	Tomsk
16:00 MSK (UTC+4)	Kim (yellow card) 4'; Ivanov (yellow card) 6'; Dzhioyev (yellow card) 29' (yellow-red card) 55'; Klimov (yellow card) 50' (yellow-red card) 75'; Jokić (yellow card) 90'; D.N.Smirnov (yellow card) 90'	Summary	Tekke (yellow card) 4'; Gorbanets (yellow card) 8' (yellow-red card) 83'; Kasaev (yellow card) 11'; Ansaldi (yellow card) 42'; Bukharov 76'; Orekhov (yellow card) 90'; Ryzhikov (yellow card) 90'	Stadium: Trud Stadium; Attendance: 14,000; Referee: Nikolai Ivanov

27 March 2010 3	Krylia Sovetov	2 – 3	Tom Tomsk	Samara
13:30 MSK (UTC+4)	Ivanov 5' (o.g.); Gultyayev 12' (o.g.); Adzhindzhal (yellow card) 16'; Savin 48'; Belozyorov (yellow card) 90'	Summary	Michkov 24' (pen.); Kovalchuk 32'; Jokić 39'; Kim (yellow card) 50' (yellow-red card) 90'; Gultyayev (yellow card) 65'; Pareiko (yellow card) 90'	Stadium: Metallurg Stadium; Attendance: 12,000; Referee: Evgeny Turbin

4 April 2010 4	Tom Tomsk	2 – 2	Spartak Moscow	Tomsk
11:30 MSK (UTC+4)	Kornilenko 8' (pen.) (yellow card) 23'; Klimov 39' (yellow card) 87'; Covalciuc (yellow card) 83'; Skoblyakov (yellow card) 86'	Summary	Sheshukov (yellow card) 9'; Welliton (yellow card) 21' (goal) 29'; Ibson 47'; Ari (yellow card) 62'; Alex (yellow card) 90'	Stadium: Trud Stadium; Attendance: 14,500; Referee: Vladislav Bezborodov

10 April 2010 5	Dynamo Moscow	0 – 0	Tom Tomsk	Khimki
18:30 MSK (UTC+4)	Khokhlov (yellow card) 24'	Summary	Jokić (yellow card) 49'; Klimov (yellow card) 79'	Stadium: Arena Khimki; Attendance: 5,177; Referee: Vladimir Kazmenko

17 April 2010 6	Tom Tomsk	0 – 0	Zenit St.Petersburg	Tomsk
11:30 MSK (UTC+4)	Klimov (yellow card) 9'; Ivanov (yellow card) 54'; Kharitonov (yellow card) 70'; Michkov (yellow card) 87'	Summary	Kerzhakov (yellow card) 15'; Zyryanov (yellow card) 63'; Križanac (yellow card) 71'	Stadium: Trud Stadium; Attendance: 14,500; Referee: Maksim Layushkin

24 April 2010 7	Lokomotiv Moscow	2 – 1	Tom Tomsk	Moscow
18:30 MSK (UTC+4)	Glushakov 33'; Aliyev 43'	Summary	Kornilenko 83'; Dzhioyev (yellow card) 89'	Stadium: Lokomotiv Stadium; Attendance: 13,600; Referee: Vyacheslav Popov

2 May 2010 8	CSKA Moscow	3 – 1	Tom Tomsk	Moscow
14:00 MSK (UTC+4)	Krasić 20' (yellow card) 21'; Guilherme 72', 90'; Odiah (yellow card) 75'	Summary	Kharitonov 15'; Jokić (yellow card) 44'	Stadium: Arena Khimki; Attendance: 6,500; Referee: Stanislav Sukhina

6 May 2010 9	Tom Tomsk	2 – 1	Terek Grozny	Tomsk
12:00 MSK (UTC+4)	Kornilenko 22' (pen.); Ivanov (yellow card) 45'; Dzhioyev (yellow card) 81'; Dzyuba 85'	Summary	Ferreira (yellow card) 21'; Maurício (yellow card) 31'; Arce (yellow card) 45'; Asildarov 47'; Kobenko (yellow card) 63'; Sadayev (yellow card) 87'	Stadium: Trud Stadium; Attendance: 10,500; Referee: Aleksandr Kolobaev

11 May 2010 10	Saturn	1 – 2	Tom Tomsk	Ramenskoye
16:00 MSK (UTC+4)	Kirichenko 59'; Grachyov (yellow card) 63'; Sapeta (yellow card) 72'	Summary	Kharitonov (yellow card) 31'; Gultyayev 48'; Kornilenko (yellow card) 83' (goal) 85'	Stadium: Saturn Stadium; Attendance: 5,000; Referee: Yuri Baskakov

15 May 2010 11	Tom Tomsk	1 – 0	Spartak Nalchik	Tomsk
16:15 MSK (UTC+4)	Kornilenko 66' (pen.); D.N.Smirnov (yellow card) 71'; Prudnikov (yellow card) 79'; Klimov (yellow card) 90'; Kharitonov (yellow card) 90'	Summary	Kontsedalov (yellow card) 44'	Stadium: Trud Stadium; Attendance: 14,000; Referee: Almir Kayumov

10 July 2010 12	Amkar Perm	2 – 1	Tom Tomsk	Perm
18:15 MSK (UTC+4)	Sirakov (yellow card) 36'; Novaković (yellow card) 43'; Belorukov (yellow card) 47'; Kushev 71' (pen.); Kolomeytsev 90'	Summary	Kornilenko (yellow card) 27' (goal) 67' (pen.); Ivanov (yellow card) 38'; Gultyayev (yellow card) 69'	Stadium: Zvezda Stadium; Attendance: 8,200; Referee: Eduard Malyi

18 July 2010 13	Tom Tomsk	1 – 4	Anzhi Makhachkala	Tomsk
16:00 MSK (UTC+4)	Pareiko (yellow card) 45'; Dzyuba 74'	Summary	Agalarov 19'; Josan (yellow card) 21' (goal) 45' (pen.); Tsorayev (yellow card) 28' (goal) 77'; Kvirkvelia (yellow card) 65'; Bakayev (yellow card) 69'; Gadzhibekov 71' (yellow card) 73'	Stadium: Trud Stadium; Attendance: 9,800; Referee: Sergey Karasev

24 July 2010 14	Alania Vladikavkaz	2 – 1	Tom Tomsk	Vladikavkaz
18:45 MSK (UTC+4)	Ivanov (yellow card) 32'; Marenich 59' (yellow card) 59'; Gnanou 70'; Kerzhakov (yellow card) 90'	Summary	Kornilenko 14' (pen.) (yellow card) 47'; Gultyayev (yellow card) 37'; Dzhioyev (yellow card) 48'	Stadium: Republican Spartak Stadium; Attendance: 15,000; Referee: Maxim Layushkin

2 August 2010 15	Tom Tomsk	3 – 2	Sibir Novosibirsk	Tomsk
16:00 MSK (UTC+4)	Dzyuba 3', 21'; Kharitonov (red card) 45'; Kim (yellow card) 45'; D.N.Smirnov 90'	Summary	Medvedev 22'; Shevchenko 24'; Molosh (yellow card) 31'; Degtyaryov (yellow card) 52'	Stadium: Trud Stadium; Attendance: 13,000; Referee: Yuri Baskakov

8 August 2010 16	Rubin Kazan	2 – 1	Tom Tomsk	Kazan
20:30 MSK (UTC+4)	Ryazantsev 36'; Orekhov 64'	Summary	Dzyuba 37'	Stadium: Kazan Arena; Attendance: 13,975; Referee: Almir Kayumov

14 August 2010 17	Tom Tomsk	1 – 1	Krylia Sovetov	Tomsk
13:45 MSK (UTC+4)	Dzhioyev 54'; D.N.Smirnov (yellow card) 71'; Klimov (yellow card) 76'; Kornilenko (yellow card) 81'	Summary	Tsallagov (yellow card) 17'; Adzhindzhal (yellow card) 27' (yellow-red card) 63'; Savin 62'; Taranov (yellow card) 66'; Belozyorov (yellow card) 68'	Stadium: Trud Stadium; Attendance: 10,000; Referee: Aleksey Eskov

21 August 2010 18	Spartak Moscow	4 – 2	Tom Tomsk	Moscow
16:00 MSK (UTC+4)	Welliton (yellow card) 29' (goal) 52', 55', 58'; Ivanov (yellow card) 68'; Bazhenov (yellow card) 81'; Alex 87'; Pesyakov (red card) 90'	Summary	Klimov (yellow card) 20'; Jokić (yellow card) 34'; Khatazhenkov (yellow card) 34'; Kim (yellow card) 55'; Kornilenko 66', 90' (pen.)	Stadium: Lokomotiv Stadium; Attendance: 14,000; Referee: Eduard Malyi

29 August 2010 19	Tom Tomsk	1 – 0	Dynamo Moscow	Tomsk
13:45 MSK (UTC+4)	Kudryashov (yellow card) 23'; Dzyuba 49' (pen.); Pareiko (yellow card) 90'	Summary	Dujmović (yellow card) 31'; Voronin (yellow card) 59'	Stadium: Trud Stadium; Attendance: 12,000; Referee: Mikhail Vilkov

11 September 2010 20	Zenit St.Petersburg	2 – 0	Tom Tomsk	Saint Petersburg
15:15 MSK (UTC+4)	Petković 3' (o.g.); Bukharov 45'; Anyukov (yellow card) 66'; Shirokov (red card) 90'	Summary	Smirnov (yellow card) 27' (yellow-red card) 84'; Kharitonov (yellow card) 81'	Stadium: Petrovsky Stadium; Attendance: 20,100; Referee: Aleksandr Gvardis

19 September 2010 21	Tom Tomsk	1 – 1	Lokomotiv Moscow	Tomsk
14:00 MSK (UTC+4)	Kim (yellow card) 17' (yellow-red card) 67'; Yanbayev 44' (o.g.); Dzyuba (yellow card) 70'; Petković (yellow card) 90'	Summary	Gatagov 39'; Loskov (yellow card) 67'	Stadium: Trud Stadium; Attendance: 12,000; Referee: Vladimir Pettay

26 September 2010 22	Tom Tomsk	0 – 3	CSKA Moscow	Tomsk
13:30 MSK (UTC+4)		Summary	Vágner Love 1'; Nababkin (yellow card) 19'; Doumbia 40' (yellow card) 87'; Necid 90'	Stadium: Trud Stadium; Attendance: 14,000; Referee: Stanislav Sukhina

2 October 2010 23	Terek Grozny	1 – 0	Tom Tomsk	Grozny
18:30 MSK (UTC+4)	Asildarov 21' (pen.)	Summary	Kim (yellow card) 38'; Petković (yellow card) 50'; Kudryashov (yellow card) 56'; D.N.Smirnov (yellow card) 82'	Stadium: Sultan Bilimkhanov Stadium; Attendance: 7,500; Referee: Almir Kayumov

16 October 2010 24	Tom Tomsk	2 – 2	Saturn	Tomsk
14:00 MSK (UTC+4)	Dzyuba 18', 56'	Summary	Karyaka 21'; Sapeta (yellow card) 63'; Topić 66' (yellow card) 90'	Stadium: Trud Stadium; Attendance: 8,000; Referee: Alexey Nikolaev

23 October 2010 25	Spartak Nalchik	2 – 1	Tom Tomsk	Nalchik
16:15 MSK (UTC+4)	Dyadyun 60'; Siradze 90'	Summary	Gultyayev (yellow card) 41'; Starikov 55'	Stadium: Spartak Stadium; Attendance: 7,000; Referee: Yuri Baskakov

31 October 2010 26	Tom Tomsk	1 – 0	Amkar Perm	Tomsk
12:45 MSK (UTC+4)	Kudryashov (yellow card) 35'; Kharitonov 53'; Jokić (yellow card) 78'	Summary	Volkov (yellow card) 32' (yellow-red card) 39'; Kolomeytsev (yellow card) 62'; Topchu (yellow card) 78'	Stadium: Trud Stadium; Attendance: 14,500; Referee: Aleksandr Kolobaev

6 November 2010 27	Anzhi Makhachkala	1 – 0	Tom Tomsk	Makhachkala
17:15 MSK (UTC+4)	Strelkov 23'	Summary	Gultyayev 29'; Kudryashov (yellow card) 32'; Petković (yellow card) 36'; Kim (yellow card) 75'	Stadium: Dynamo Stadium; Attendance: 8,700; Referee: Alexey Nikolaev

13 November 2010 28	Tom Tomsk	1 – 1	Alania Vladikavkaz	Tomsk
15:30 MSK (UTC+4)	Dzyuba 5' (pen.); Starikov (yellow card) 46'; Kudryashov (yellow card) 78'	Summary	Bulgaru (yellow card) 4'; Gnanou (yellow card) 17'; Gabulov 65'; Collins (yellow card) 70'; Bikmaev (yellow card) 90'	Stadium: Trud Stadium; Attendance: 8,000; Referee: Maxim Layushkin

20 November 2010 29	Sibir Novosibirsk	0 – 1	Tom Tomsk	Novosibirsk
15:00 MSK (UTC+4)	Antipenko (yellow card) 70'; Šumulikoski (yellow card) 72'	Summary	Dzyuba 52' (pen.); Michkov (yellow card) 61'; Jokić (red card) 84'	Stadium: Spartak Stadium; Attendance: 5,000; Referee: Vitaly Meshkov

28 November 2010 30	Tom Tomsk	3 – 1	Rostov	Tomsk
15:00 MSK (UTC+4)	Stroyev (yellow card) 54'; Kharitonov 57', 79'; Klimov (yellow card) 85'; Kovalchuk 90'	Summary	Lebedenko (yellow card) 29'; Grigalava (yellow card) 52'; Yankov 55' (yellow card) 90'; Blatnjak (yellow card) 85'; Gațcan (yellow card) 85'	Stadium: Trud Stadium; Attendance: 10,000; Referee: Vladimir Pettay

==== League table ====
Pos	Team	Pld	W	D	L	GF	GA	GD	Pts	Qualification or relegation
6	Spartak Nalchik	30	12	8	10	40	37	+3	44	
7	Dynamo Moscow	30	9	13	8	38	31	+7	40	
8	Tom Tomsk	30	10	7	13	35	43	−8	37	
9	Rostov	30	10	4	16	27	44	−17	34	
10	Saturn	30	8	10	12	27	38	−11	34	Team disbanded after season (Note: Saturn Moscow Oblast were disbanded at the end of the season after amassing debts of RUB 800m.)

Source: RFPL (in Russian)
Rules for classification: 1st points; 2nd matches won; 3rd head-to-head (points, matches won, goal difference, goals scored, away goals scored); 4th goal difference; 5th goals scored; 6th away goals scored; 7th position in previous season or decision game

=== Russian Cup ===
14 July 2010 Round of 32	Krasnodar	2 – 1 (a.e.t.)	Tom Tomsk	Krasnodar
20:00 MSK (UTC+4)	Picuşceac 8'; Tsukanov (yellow card) 63'; Miroshnichenko (yellow card) 73'; Tatarchuk 96'; Knežević (yellow card) 115'; Kulikov (yellow card) 120'	Report	Dzyuba 42' (yellow card) 109'; Ivanov (yellow card) 58'; Dzhioyev (yellow card) 105' (yellow-red card) 120'	Stadium: Kuban Stadium; Attendance: 3,500; Referee: Mikhail Vilkov

== Squad statistics ==
=== Appearances and goals ===
No.	Pos	Nat	Player	Total		Premier League		Russian Cup	
No.	Pos	Nat	Player	Apps	Goals	Apps	Goals	Apps	Goals
3	MF	(Russia) RUS	Valeri Klimov	28	1	24+3	1	1	0
5	MF	(Russia) RUS	Sergei Skoblyakov	21	0	13+7	0	1	0
6	MF	(Russia) RUS	Dmitri Michkov	31	1	29+1	1	1	0
9	MF	(Moldova) MDA	Serghei Covalciuc	25	0	21+4	0	0	0
10	FW	(North Macedonia) MKD	Goran Maznov	18	0	8+9	0	1	0
11	MF	(Ukraine) UKR	Kyrylo Kovalchuk	14	2	3+10	2	1	0
12	GK	(Uzbekistan) UZB	Aleksei Poliakov	4	0	4	0	0	0
13	DF	(Russia) RUS	Ilya Gultyayev	27	1	24+2	1	0+1	0
18	DF	(Russia) RUS	Vladislav Khatazhyonkov	8	0	4+4	0	0	0
20	FW	(Russia) RUS	Artyom Dzyuba	25	11	22+2	10	1	1
21	DF	(Serbia) SRB	Nikola Petković	7	0	7	0	0	0
23	DF	(Russia) RUS	Georgi Dzhioyev	21	1	16+4	1	1	0
24	DF	(Russia) RUS	Dmitri N.Smirnov	21	1	16+5	1	0	0
25	GK	(Estonia) EST	Sergei Pareiko	27	0	26	0	1	0
26	DF	(Russia) RUS	Viktor Stroyev	9	0	1+7	0	1	0
33	MF	(Japan) JPN	Daisuke Matsui	7	0	3+4	0	0	0
36	DF	(Russia) RUS	Fyodor Kudryashov	10	0	9+1	0	0	0
37	DF	(Serbia) SRB	Đorđe Jokić	26	1	25	1	1	0
55	MF	(South Korea) KOR	Kim Nam-il	24	0	24	0	0	0
75	MF	(Russia) RUS	Viktor Svezhov	1	0	0+1	0	0	0
83	MF	(Russia) RUS	Aleksandr Kharitonov	25	4	22+2	4	0+1	0
87	FW	(United States) USA	Eugene Starikov	9	1	6+3	1	0	0
Players who appeared for Terek Grozny but left during the season:
4	MF	(Russia) RUS	Vasili Yanotovsky	1	0	0	0	0+1	0
8	FW	(Russia) RUS	Denis Kiselyov	2	0	0+2	0	0	0
14	FW	(Belarus) BLR	Sergei Kornilenko	15	11	12+3	11	0	0
17	DF	(Russia) RUS	Andrei Ivanov	14	0	11+2	0	1	0
19	FW	(Russia) RUS	Aleksandr Prudnikov	6	0	0+6	0	0	0
81	MF	(Hungary) HUN	Norbert Németh	1	0	0+1	0	0	0

=== Goal Scorers ===
Place	Position	Nation	Number	Name	Russian Premier League	Russian Cup	Total
1	FW	(Belarus)	14	Sergei Kornilenko	11	0	11
1	FW	(Russia)	20	Artyom Dzyuba	10	1	11
3	MF	(Russia)	83	Aleksandr Kharitonov	4	0	4
4	MF	(Ukraine)	11	Kyrylo Kovalchuk	2	0	2
5	MF	(Russia)	6	Dmitri Michkov	1	0	1
5	DF	(Serbia)	37	Đorđe Jokić	1	0	1
5	MF	(Russia)	3	Valeri Klimov	1	0	1
5	DF	(Russia)	13	Ilya Gultyayev	1	0	1
5	DF	(Russia)	24	Dmitri N.Smirnov	1	0	1
5	DF	(Russia)	23	Georgi Dzhioyev	1	0	1
5	FW	(United States)	87	Eugene Starikov	1	0	1
5				Own goal	1	0	1
				TOTALS	35	1	36

=== Disciplinary record ===
Number	Nation	Position	Name	Russian Premier League		Russian Cup		Total	
Number	Nation	Position	Name	Yellow card	Red card	Yellow card	Red card	Yellow card	Red card
3	(Russia)	MF	Valeri Klimov	9	1	0	0	9	1
5	(Russia)	MF	Sergei Skoblyakov	1	0	0	0	1	0
6	(Russia)	MF	Dmitri Michkov	2	0	0	0	2	0
9	(Moldova)	MF	Serghei Covalciuc	1	0	0	0	1	0
13	(Russia)	DF	Ilya Gultyayev	4	0	0	0	4	0
14	(Belarus)	FW	Sergei Kornilenko	5	0	0	0	5	0
17	(Russia)	DF	Andrei Ivanov	4	0	1	0	5	0
18	(Russia)	DF	Vladislav Khatazhyonkov	1	0	0	0	1	0
19	(Russia)	FW	Aleksandr Prudnikov	1	0	0	0	1	0
20	(Russia)	FW	Artyom Dzyuba	1	0	1	0	2	0
21	(Serbia)	DF	Nikola Petković	3	0	0	0	3	0
23	(Russia)	DF	Georgi Dzhioyev	5	1	2	1	7	1
24	(Russia)	DF	Dmitri N.Smirnov	6	1	0	0	6	1
25	(Estonia)	GK	Sergei Pareiko	3	0	0	0	3	0
26	(Russia)	DF	Viktor Stroyev	1	0	0	0	1	0
36	(Russia)	DF	Fyodor Kudryashov	5	0	0	0	5	0
37	(Serbia)	DF	Đorđe Jokić	5	1	0	0	5	1
55	(South Korea)	MF	Kim Nam-il	9	2	0	0	9	2
83	(Russia)	MF	Aleksandr Kharitonov	4	1	0	0	4	1
87	(United States)	FW	Eugene Starikov	1	0	0	0	1	0
			TOTALS	68	7	4	1	72	8
