= 2010 FC Zenit Saint Petersburg season =

Zenit Saint Petersburg
2010 season
- Chairman: Aleksandr Dyukov
- Manager: Luciano Spalletti
- Stadium: Petrovsky Stadium
- Russian Premier League: 1st
- Russian Cup: Winners
- Champions League: Play-off round
- Europa League: Round of 32
- Top goalscorer: League: Aleksandr Kerzhakov (13); All: Aleksandr Kerzhakov (17)
- Highest home attendance: 21,570 (21 August vs Auxerre, UEFA Champions League)
- Lowest home attendance: 18,500 (17 July vs Sibir Novosibirsk, Russian Premier League)
Home colours	Away colours

The 2010 FC Zenit Saint Petersburg season was the 15th straight season that the club will play in the Russian Premier League, the highest tier of football in Russia. The club won the Russian Premier League for the second time in four years and the Russian Cup for the first time since 1999, completing a double.

Internationally, the club was registered for Europe's highest level of football competition, the 2010–11 UEFA Champions League, as the third place team from Russia in 2009. Zenit were drawn into the Group Stage of the 2010–11 UEFA Europa League alongside Anderlecht, AEK Athens and Hajduk after falling 2–1 on aggregate to French club Auxerre in the Champions League play-off round.

== Season events ==
- 11 January: Defender Michael Lumb signs for Zenit from AGF Aarhus.
- 16 January: Striker Aleksandr Kerzhakov returns to Zenit from Dynamo Moscow after spending six seasons with the club from 2001-06.
- 26 January: Defender Kim Dong-jin's contract is terminated due to medical examinations and fainting bouts experienced during practices with the South Korea national team.
- 28 January: Zenit plays its first match of 2010, a friendly against Uzbek side Lokomotiv Tashkent during training camp in Dubai, United Arab Emirates.
- 29 January: Midfielder Igor Semshov rejoins Dynamo Moscow on a three-year contract for an undisclosed fee.
- 3 February: Striker and club leading goal scorer from 2008 and 2009 Fatih Tekke joins Rubin Kazan on a three-year contract for an undisclosed fee.
- 23 February: Goalkeeper Yuri Zhevnov signs for Zenit from FC Moscow.
- 3 March: Striker Danko Lazović signs for Zenit from PSV.
- 9 March: Striker Sergey Kornilenko joins former club Tom Tomsk on a one-year loan deal with the option to return to Zenit during the summer.
- 13 March: Midfielder Danny plays his first match in ten months after suffering a season-ending injury in May 2009 and scores the winning goal against Krylia Sovetov.
- 16 May: Zenit wins the Russian Cup 1–0 over Sibir Novosibirsk, with the Cup-winning goal scored by midfielder Roman Shirokov.
- 5 July: Defender Nicolas Lombaerts signs a new four-year contract with the club.
- 19 July: Striker Aleksandr Bukharov signs for Zenit from Rubin Kazan. Newly acquired defender Michael Lumb is loaned to Feyenoord until July 2011 due to lack of playing time with the club.
- 29 July: Midfielder Igor Denisov signs a new five-year contract with the club and defender Aleksandar Luković signs for Zenit from Udinese.
- 31 July: Zenit wins its ninth-straight Russian Premier League match after defeating reigning champions Rubin Kazan 2–0 on a double from striker Aleksandr Kerzhakov. Defender Sébastien Puygrenier returns from a year loan at Monaco and attends Zenit's summer camp in Austria before receiving another one-year loan deal with Monaco.
- 3 August: Defender Bruno Alves signs for Zenit from Porto for a Russian Premier League-record €22 million foreign transfer fee.
- 4 August: Zenit defeats Unirea Urziceni 1–0 on aggregate to advance to the play-off round of the 2010–11 UEFA Champions League. Danny scores the only goal of the tie in the 33rd minute of the second leg, assisted by Vladimir Bystrov.
- 5 August: Midfielder Sergei Semak signs for Zenit from Rubin Kazan.
- 25 August: Manager Luciano Spalletti suffers his first competitive loss with Zenit, falling 2–0 to French club Auxerre at the Stade de l'Abbé-Deschamps. Zenit sees both goalkeeper Vyacheslav Malafeev and defender Tomáš Hubočan sent off by Slovenian referee Damir Skomina as the club falls out of the Champions League 2–1 on aggregate.
- 27 August: Zenit are seeded into Pot No. 1 of the Europa League with a UEFA coefficient of 61.258 and drawn into a group with Anderlecht, AEK Athens and Hajduk Split.
- 7 September: Zenit release midfielder Radek Šírl.
- 14 November: Zenit win the 2010 Russian Premier League by defeating Rostov at the Petrovsky Stadium 5–0.
- 9 December: 10 Zenit players are named to the annual RFU Top 33 Best Players list with seven players – Aleksandr Anyukov (right back), Tomáš Hubočan (left back), Igor Denisov (defensive midfield), Vladimir Bystrov (right midfield), Konstantin Zyryanov (central midfield), Danny (left midfield) and Aleksandr Kerzhakov (right forward) – named the best at their respective position.
- 19 December: Four Zenit players receive trophies at the RFU's award ceremony in Moscow. Aleksandr Kerzhakov was named Striker of the Year, Danny was named the best foreign player, manager Luciano Spalletti was named Coach of the Year, and captain Aleksandr Anyukov was named Most Valuable Player.

== Squad ==
As of match played 17 December 2010

No.	Name	Nationality	Position	Date of birth (Age)	Signed from	Signed in	Contract ends	Apps.	Goals
Goalkeepers
16	Vyacheslav Malafeev	(Russia)	GK	4 March 1979 (aged 31)	Trainee	1999			
22	Dmitri Borodin	(Russia)	GK	8 October 1977 (aged 33)	Anzhi Makhachkala	2009			
30	Yuri Zhevnov	(Belarus)	GK	17 April 1981 (aged 29)	FC Moscow	2010			
71	Yegor Baburin	(Russia)	GK	9 August 1993 (aged 17)	DYuSSh Smena-Zenit	2010			
81	Aleksandr Glinskikh	(Russia)	GK	16 August 1991 (aged 19)	DYuSSh Smena-Zenit	2010		0	0
90	Aleksei Dugnist	(Russia)	GK	11 March 1993 (aged 17)	DYuSSh Smena-Zenit	2010		0	0
91	Andrei Zaytsev	(Russia)	GK	14 January 1991 (aged 19)	DYuSSh Smena-Zenit	2008			
Defenders
2	Aleksandr Anyukov	(Russia)	DF	28 September 1982 (aged 28)	Krylia Sovetov	2005			
3	Bruno Alves	(Portugal)	DF	27 November 1981 (aged 29)	Porto	2010			
4	Ivica Križanac	(Croatia)	DF	13 April 1979 (aged 31)	Dyskobolia Grodzisk Wielkopolski	2005			
5	Fernando Meira	(Portugal)	DF	28 September 1982 (aged 28)	Galatasaray	2009			
6	Nicolas Lombaerts	(Belgium)	DF	20 March 1985 (aged 25)	KAA Gent	2007			
14	Tomáš Hubočan	(Slovakia)	DF	17 September 1985 (aged 25)	MŠK Žilina	2008			
24	Aleksandar Luković	(Serbia)	DF	23 October 1982 (aged 28)	Udinese Calcio	2010			
47	Basel Abdoulfattakh	(Russia)	MF	6 March 1990 (aged 20)	DYuSSh Smena-Zenit	2008			
48	Aslan Dudiyev	(Russia)	DF	15 June 1990 (aged 20)	loan from Akademiya Tolyatti	2010			
50	Igor Cheminava	(Russia)	DF	23 March 1991 (aged 19)	DYuSSh Smena-Zenit	2008			
55	Sergei Kostin	(Russia)	DF	15 June 1991 (aged 19)	DYuSSh Smena-Zenit	2009			
64	Ilya Lebedev	(Russia)	DF	1 June 1993 (aged 17)	DYuSSh Smena-Zenit	2010			
66	Yuriy Ponomarenko	(Russia)	DF	30 August 1993 (aged 17)	DYuSSh Smena-Zenit	2010			
74	Vladimir Malyshev	(Russia)	DF	4 January 1993 (aged 17)	DYuSSh Smena-Zenit	2010			
83	Andrei Vasilyev	(Russia)	MF	11 February 1992 (aged 18)	DYuSSh Smena-Zenit	2010			
88	Dmitri Telegin	(Russia)	DF	2 January 1992 (aged 18)	DYuSSh Smena-Zenit	2010			
89	Solomon Kvirkvelia	(Georgia (country))	DF	6 February 1992 (aged 18)	Tengiz Sulakvelidze Academy Tbilisi	2010			
Midfielders
10	Danny	(Portugal)	MF	7 August 1983 (aged 27)	Dynamo Moscow	2008			
15	Roman Shirokov	(Russia)	MF	6 July 1981 (aged 29)	Khimki	2008			
17	Alessandro Rosina	(Italy)	MF	31 January 1984 (aged 26)	Torino	2009			
18	Konstantin Zyryanov	(Russia)	MF	5 October 1977 (aged 33)	Torpedo Moscow	2007			
20	Viktor Fayzulin	(Russia)	MF	22 April 1986 (aged 24)	Spartak Nalchik	2008			
23	Szabolcs Huszti	(Hungary)	MF	18 April 1983 (aged 27)	Hannover 96	2009			
25	Sergei Semak	(Russia)	MF	27 February 1976 (aged 34)	Rubin Kazan	2010			
27	Igor Denisov	(Russia)	MF	17 May 1984 (aged 26)	Trainee	2002			
34	Vladimir Bystrov	(Russia)	MF	31 January 1984 (aged 26)	Spartak Moscow	2009			
57	Aleksei Ionov	(Russia)	MF	18 February 1989 (aged 21)	Trainee	2007			
63	Denis Terentyev	(Russia)	MF	13 August 1992 (aged 18)	DYuSSh Smena-Zenit	2010			
69	Yevgeni Bashkirov	(Russia)	MF	6 July 1991 (aged 19)	DYuSSh Smena-Zenit	2009			
75	Ilya Sagdatullin	(Russia)	MF	27 February 1991 (aged 19)	Trainee	2007			
77	Alexandr Petrov	(Russia)	MF	18 January 1992 (aged 18)	DYuSSh Smena-Zenit	2010			
80	Maxim Batov	(Russia)	MF	5 June 1992 (aged 18)	DYuSSh Smena-Zenit	2009			
87	Alexei Kayukov	(Russia)	MF	9 February 1993 (aged 17)	DYuSSh Smena-Zenit	2010			
92	Nikita Bocharov	(Russia)	MF	12 June 1992 (aged 18)	DYuSSh Smena-Zenit	2009			
96	Roland Gigolayev	(Russia)	MF	4 January 1990 (aged 20)	Yunost Vladikavkaz	2005			
98	Sergei Petrov	(Russia)	MF	2 January 1991 (aged 19)	DYuSSh Smena-Zenit	2008			
Forwards
8	Danko Lazović	(Serbia)	ST	17 May 1983 (aged 27)	PSV Eindhoven	2010			
9	Aleksandr Bukharov	(Russia)	ST	12 March 1985 (aged 25)	Rubin Kazan	2010			
11	Aleksandr Kerzhakov	(Russia)	ST	27 November 1982 (aged 28)	Dynamo Moscow	2010			
36	Stanislav Matyash	(Russia)	ST	23 April 1991 (aged 19)	Trainee	2007		0	0
70	Vyacheslav Sushkin	(Russia)	ST	11 March 1991 (aged 19)	DYuSSh Smena-Zenit	2009		0	0
73	Stanislav Murikhin	(Russia)	ST	21 January 1992 (aged 18)	DYuSSh Smena-Zenit	2009		0	0
78	Vladislav Yefimov	(Russia)	ST	21 April 1994 (aged 16)	DYuSSh Smena-Zenit	2010		0	0
93	Alexei Panfilov	(Russia)	ST	14 October 1993 (aged 17)	DYuSSh Smena-Zenit	2010		0	0
95	Pavel Shuvalov	(Russia)	ST	3 February 1993 (aged 17)	DYuSSh Smena-Zenit	2010		0	0
97	Vladislav Sirotov	(Russia)	ST	27 October 1991 (aged 19)	DYuSSh Smena-Zenit	2010		0	0
99	Maksim Kanunnikov	(Russia)	ST	14 July 1991 (aged 19)	DYuSSh Smena-Zenit	2009		1	0
Out on loan
28	Michael Lumb	(Denmark)	DF	9 January 1988 (aged 22)	AGF Aarhus	2010			
35	Anton Sosnin	(Russia)	MF	27 January 1990 (aged 20)	Trainee	2007			
37	Aleksandr Khokhlov	(Russia)	DF	30 September 1988 (aged 22)	Trainee	2006			
	Sébastien Puygrenier	(France)	DF	28 January 1982 (aged 28)	Nancy	2008		14	1
	Sergei Kornilenko	(Belarus)	ST	14 June 1983 (aged 27)	Tom Tomsk	2009		18	1
	Eugene Starikov	(United States)	ST	17 November 1988 (aged 22)	Bradenton Academics	2009		0	0
Left during the season
7	Radek Šírl	(Czech Republic)	MF	20 March 1981 (aged 29)	Sparta Prague	2003			

== Transfers ==
=== In ===
Date	Position	Nationality	Name	From	Fee	Ref.
11 January 2010	DF	(Denmark)	Michael Lumb	AGF Aarhus	Undisclosed	
16 January 2010	FW	(Russia)	Aleksandr Kerzhakov	Dynamo Moscow	Undisclosed	
23 February 2010	GK	(Belarus)	Yuri Zhevnov	FC Moscow	Undisclosed	
3 March 2010	FW	(Serbia)	Danko Lazović	PSV Eindhoven	Undisclosed	
19 July 2010	FW	(Russia)	Aleksandr Bukharov	Rubin Kazan	Undisclosed	
29 July 2010	DF	(Serbia)	Aleksandar Luković	Udinese	Undisclosed	
3 August 2010	DF	(Portugal)	Bruno Alves	Porto	Undisclosed	
5 August 2010	MF	(Russia)	Sergei Semak	Rubin Kazan	Undisclosed	

=== Out ===
Date	Position	Nationality	Name	To	Fee	Ref.
29 January 2010	MF	(Russia)	Igor Semshov	Dynamo Moscow	Undisclosed	
3 February 2010	FW	(Turkey)	Fatih Tekke	Rubin Kazan	Undisclosed	

=== Loans out ===
Date from	Position	Nationality	Name	To	Date to	Ref.
9 March 2010	FW	(Belarus)	Sergei Kornilenko	Tom Tomsk	Summer 2010	
9 March 2010	FW	(United States)	Eugene Starikov	Tom Tomsk		
19 July 2010	DF	(Denmark)	Michael Lumb	Feyenoord		
2 August 2010	DF	(France)	Sébastien Puygrenier	Monaco	End of Season	
20 August 2010	MF	(Russia)	Anton Sosnin	Krylia Sovetov	End of Season	
26 August 2010	FW	(Belarus)	Sergei Kornilenko	Rubin Kazan	End of Season	
27 August 2010	DF	(Russia)	Aleksandr Khokhlov	Spartak Nalchik	End of Season	

=== Released ===
Date	Position	Nationality	Name	Joined	Date	Ref.
1 January 2010	GK	(Slovakia)	Kamil Čontofalský	AEL Limassol		
26 January 2010	DF	(South Korea)	Kim Dong-jin	Ulsan Hyundai	2 February 2010	
7 September 2010	MF	(Czech Republic)	Radek Šírl	Mladá Boleslav	14 September 2016	

== Friendlies ==
Winter

28 January 2010	Zenit Saint Petersburg (Russia)	0 – 0	(Uzbekistan) Lokomotiv Tashkent	Dubai, United Arab Emirates
19:00 MST

30 January 2010	Zenit Saint Petersburg (Russia)	1 – 0	(Uzbekistan) Bunyodkor	Dubai, United Arab Emirates
14:30 MST	Rosina 34' (pen.); Denisov (yellow card) 43'

8 February 2010	Polonia Warszawa (Poland)	1 – 0	(Russia) Zenit Saint Petersburg	Murcia, Spain
17:00 MST	Mierzejewski 24'		Hubočan (yellow card) 35'; Shirokov (yellow card) 44'

12 February 2010	Lillestrøm (Norway)	3 – 2	(Russia) Zenit Saint Petersburg	Murcia, Spain
20:00 MST	Nosakhare Igiebor 17'; Eriksen 49'; Sigurðarson 79'		Anyukov (yellow card) 55'; Kerzhakov 62'; Kanunnikov (yellow card) 69'; Huszti (yellow card) 84'; Kanunnikov 89'

13 February 2010	Viking (Norway)	1 – 0	(Russia) Zenit Saint Petersburg	Murcia, Spain
18:00 MST	Križanac 10' (o.g.)		Kornilenko (yellow card) 44'; Kerzhakov (yellow card) 73'; Meira (yellow card) 85'

21 February 2010	Örebro (Sweden)	0 – 2	(Russia) Zenit Saint Petersburg	Marbella, Spain
18:00 MST			Kanunnikov 25'; Hubočan 68'

23 February 2010	Zenit Saint Petersburg (Russia)	1 – 2	(Ukraine) Dynamo Kyiv	Marbella, Spain
16:30 MST	Hubočan 22'		Kravets 15'; Almeida (yellow card) 40'; Mykhalyk (yellow card) 58'; Milevskyi 80' (pen.)	Stadium: Estadio Municipal de Marbella; Referee: (Spain) Angel Valverde Martinez

27 February 2010	AaB (Denmark)	1 – 2	(Russia) Zenit Saint Petersburg	Marbella, Spain
18:00 MST	Würtz 40'; Jakobsen (yellow card) 50'		Bystrov 34', 59'; Bystrov (yellow card) 50'; Križanac (yellow card) 89'	Stadium: Estadio Municipal de Marbella; Referee: (Spain) Carlos Natta

Summer

15 June 2010	Zestaponi (Georgia (country))	0 – 0	(Russia) Zenit Saint Petersburg	Mittersill, Austria
20:00 MST			Križanac (yellow card) 73'

18 June 2010	Spartak Trnava (Slovakia)	1 – 2	(Russia) Zenit Saint Petersburg	Kundl, Austria
18:00 MST	Banovič (yellow card) 35'; Machovec 82'; Machovec (yellow card) 88'		Bystrov 17', 38'; Zyryanov (yellow card) 44'; Meira (yellow card) 71'; Šírl (yellow card) 88'

21 June 2010	Zenit Saint Petersburg (Russia)	3 – 1	(Ukraine) Dynamo Kyiv	Schwaz, Austria
19:00 MST	Lumb (yellow card) 7'; Kerzhakov 25', 43'; Bystrov (yellow card) 35'; Kanunnikov 60'; Denisov (yellow card) 74'		Zozulya 8'; Khacheridi (yellow card) 58'

24 June 2010	Zenit Saint Petersburg (Russia)	1 – 0	(Ukraine) Karpaty Lviv	Reif, Austria
16:00 MST	Zyryanov (yellow card) 31'; Zyryanov 34'; Križanac (yellow card) 90'		Fedetskiy (yellow card) 23'; Oshchypko (yellow card) 62'

== Competitions ==
=== Russian Premier League ===
==== Results summary ====
Overall								Home						Away					
Pld	W	D	L	GF	GA	GD	Pts	W	D	L	GF	GA	GD	W	D	L	GF	GA	GD
30	20	8	2	61	21	+40	68	10	4	1	31	8	+23	10	4	1	30	13	+17

Last updated: 23 November 2016.
Source: See Results

==== Results by matchday ====
Round	1	2	3	4	5	6	7	8	9	10	11	12	13	14	15	16	17	18	19	20	21	22	23	24	25	26	27	28	29	30
Ground	A	H	A	H	A	H	A	A	H	A	H	A	H	A	H	H	A	H	A	H	A	H	A	A	H	A	H	H	A	H
Result	W	D	W	W	D	D	W	W	W	W	W	W	W	W	W	D	W	W	D	W	W	W	D	L	W	W	L	W	D	D
Position	4	3	3	5	3	4	2	2	1	1	1	1	1	1	1	1	1	1	1	1	1	1	1	1	1	1	1	1	1	1

Source: See Results
A = Away; H = Home; W = Win; D = Draw; L = Loss

==== Results ====
13 March 2010	Krylia Sovetov	0 – 1	Zenit Saint Petersburg	Samara, Russia
13:00 MST	Ajinjal (yellow card) 45'; Tkachyov (yellow card) 70'; Taranov (red card) 90'	Report	Danny 65'; Lumb (yellow card) 87'	Stadium: Metallurg Stadium; Attendance: 16,500; Referee: (Nizhny Novgorod Oblast) Igor Egorov

21 March 2010	Zenit Saint Petersburg	1 – 1	Spartak Moscow	Saint Petersburg, Russia
14:00 MST	Shirokov (yellow card) 37'; Kerzhakov (yellow card) 82'; Lombaerts 88'	Report	Welliton 12'; Makeev (yellow card) 56'; Parshivlyuk (yellow card) 70'; Suchý (yellow card) 80'	Stadium: Petrovsky Stadium; Attendance: 19,450; Referee: Stanislav Sukhina

27 March 2010	Dynamo Moscow	1 – 2	Zenit Saint Petersburg	Khimki, Russia
18:30 MST	Fernández (yellow card) 24'; D. Kombarov (yellow card) 34'; D. Kombarov 66' (pen.); Wilkshire (yellow card) 88'	Report	Danny 12'; Zyryanov (yellow card) 29'; Bystrov 33'; Hubočan (yellow card) 42'; Malafeev (yellow card) 65'; Anyukov (yellow card) 67'	Stadium: Arena Khimki; Attendance: 13,480; Referee: (Volgograd Oblast) Eduard Malyi

11 April 2010	Zenit Saint Petersburg	1 – 0	Lokomotiv Moscow	Saint Petersburg, Russia
14:00 MST	Danny (yellow card) 9'; Zyryanov (yellow card) 23'; Bystrov 53', (yellow card) 80'; Hubočan (yellow card) 75'; Rosina (yellow card) 90'	Report	Charles (yellow card) 9'; Asatiani (yellow card) 17'; Kuzmin (yellow card) 28'; Tarasov (yellow card) 78' (yellow-red card) 86'; Odemwingie (yellow card) 90'	Stadium: Petrovsky Stadium; Attendance: 20,300; Referee: (Nizhny Novgorod Oblast) Igor Egorov

17 April 2010	Tom Tomsk	0 – 0	Zenit Saint Petersburg	Tomsk, Russia
11:30 MST	Klimov (yellow card) 9'; Ivanov (yellow card) 54'; Kharitonov (yellow card) 70'; Michkov (yellow card) 87'	Report	Kerzhakov (yellow card) 15'; Zyryanov (yellow card) 63'; Križanac (yellow card) 71'	Stadium: Trud Stadium; Attendance: 14,500; Referee: (Moscow) Maksim Layushkin

25 April 2010	Zenit Saint Petersburg	0 – 0	Terek Grozny	Saint Petersburg, Russia
16:15 MST		Report	Ferreira (yellow card) 8'; Maurício (yellow card) 21'; Asildarov (yellow card) 28'; Arce (yellow card) 56'; Lakhiyalov (yellow card) 76'; Dikan (yellow card) 90'	Stadium: Petrovsky Stadium; Attendance: 21,000; Referee: (Moscow) Sergei Karasev

28 April 2010	CSKA Moscow	0 – 2	Zenit Saint Petersburg	Khimki, Russia
20:00 MST	Akinfeev (yellow card) 61'	Report	Križanac 5'; Kerzhakov 65'	Stadium: Arena Khimki; Attendance: 15,000; Referee: (Kaliningrad Oblast) Aleksandr Gvardis

2 May 2010	Saturn Moscow	0 – 1	Zenit Saint Petersburg	Ramenskoye, Russia
14:00 MST	Igonin (yellow card) 21'; Rebrov (red card) 25'; Ivanov (yellow card) 65'; Nakhushev (yellow card) 73'; Angbwa (yellow card) 85'	Report	Zyryanov (yellow card) 63'; Lombaerts 88'	Stadium: Saturn Stadium; Attendance: 8,500; Referee: (Moscow) Almir Kayumov

6 May 2010	Zenit Saint Petersburg	3 – 1	Spartak Nalchik	Saint Petersburg, Russia
18:45 MST	Hubočan (yellow card) 37'; Lombaerts (yellow card) 52'; Bystrov 65'; Shirokov 71' (pen.), (yellow card) 81'; Danny 74'	Report	Gogua (yellow card) 70'; Malyarov 90'	Stadium: Petrovsky Stadium; Attendance: 21,405; Referee: (Rostov Oblast) Vladimir Kazmenko

10 May 2010	Amkar Perm	0 – 2	Zenit Saint Petersburg	Perm, Russia
16:15 MST	Burmistrov (yellow card) 9'; Popov (yellow card) 34'; Fedoriv (yellow card) 45'; Belorukov (yellow card) 62'	Report	Danny (yellow card) 83', (goal) 89'; Kanunnikov 85'	Stadium: Zvezda Stadium; Attendance: 11,900; Referee: (Moscow) Aleksei Nikolaev

4 July 2010	Zenit Saint Petersburg	2 – 1	Anzhi Makhachkala	Saint Petersburg, Russia
19:00 MST	Bystrov 15'; Rosina (yellow card) 52'; Lombaerts (yellow card) 64'; Zyryanov 87'	Report	Tsorayev (yellow card) 39' (yellow-red card) 88'; Agalarov (yellow card) 49'; Tagirbekov 66'; Bakayev (yellow card) 82'	Stadium: Petrovsky Stadium; Attendance: 21,380; Referee: (Moscow) Maksim Layushkin

9 July 2010	Alania Vladikavkaz	1 – 3	Zenit Saint Petersburg	Vladikavkaz, Russia
18:45 MST	Khomich (yellow card) 26'; Mamah (yellow card) 33'; Ivanov 79'	Report	Shirokov 26' (pen.); Bystrov 34'; Lazović 39'; Malafeev (yellow card) 44'; Zyryanov (yellow card) 52'	Stadium: Republican Spartak Stadium; Attendance: 20,000; Referee: (Moscow) Vyacheslav Kharlamov

17 July 2010	Zenit Saint Petersburg	2 – 0	Sibir Novosibirsk	Saint Petersburg, Russia
18:45 MST	Lombaerts 30'; Shirokov 54'	Report	Valentić (yellow card) 33'; Medvedev (yellow card) 57'; Astafyev (yellow card) 57'; Shulenin (yellow card) 77'; Shumov (yellow card) 87'; Shevchenko (yellow card) 89'	Stadium: Petrovsky Stadium; Attendance: 18,500; Referee: (Moscow) Evgeni Turbin

24 July 2010	Rostov	1 – 3	Zenit Saint Petersburg	Rostov-on-Don, Russia
20:30 MST	Gațcan (yellow card) 56'; Cherkes (yellow card) 64'; Lebedenko 89' (pen.)	Report	Kerzhakov 45'; Danny 50'; Fayzulin 70'; Ionov (yellow card) 89'	Stadium: Olimp – 2 Attendance: 14,500; Referee: (Moscow) Aleksandr Kolobaev

31 July 2010	Zenit Saint Petersburg	2 – 0	Rubin Kazan	Saint Petersburg, Russia
16:00 MST	Denisov (yellow card) 36'; Kerzhakov 45', 65'; Anyukov (yellow card) 52'	Report	Karadeniz (yellow card) 48'	Stadium: Petrovsky Stadium; Attendance: 21,500; Referee: (Moscow) Sergei Karasev

14 August 2010	Zenit Saint Petersburg	1 – 1	Dynamo Moscow	Saint Petersburg, Russia
16:00 MST	Shirokov (yellow card) 24'; Lazović 34'; Meira (yellow card) 50'	Report	Khokhlov (yellow card) 17'; Kurányi 26', (yellow card) 90'; D. Kombarov (yellow card) 50'; Epureanu (yellow card) 58'; Wilkshire (yellow card) 89'; Gabulov (yellow card) 90'	Stadium: Petrovsky Stadium; Attendance: 20,900; Referee: (Sverdlovsk Oblast) Vyacheslav Popov

29 August 2010	Lokomotiv Moscow	0 – 3	Zenit Saint Petersburg	Moscow, Russia
16:00 MST	Torbinski (yellow card) 29' (yellow-red card) 56'; Gatagov (yellow card) 45'; Aliev (yellow card) 67'	Report	Danny 17'; Semak (yellow card) 53'; Bukharov 67'; Shirokov 78'	Stadium: Lokomotiv Stadium; Attendance: 14,187; Referee: (Nizhny Novgorod Oblast) Igor Egorov

11 September 2010	Zenit Saint Petersburg	2 – 0	Tom Tomsk	Saint Petersburg, Russia
15:15 MST	Shirokov 3', (red card) 90'; Bukharov 45'; Anyukov (yellow card) 66'	Report	Smirnov (yellow card) 27' (yellow-red card) 84'; Kharitonov (yellow card) 81'	Stadium: Petrovsky Stadium; Attendance: 20,100; Referee: (Kaliningrad Oblast) Aleksandr Gvardis

20 September 2010	Terek Grozny	0 – 0	Zenit Saint Petersburg	Grozny, Russia
16:00 MST		Report	Bystrov (yellow card) 29'; Denisov (yellow card) 87'	Stadium: Sultan Bilimkhanov Stadium; Attendance: 10,150; Referee: (Moscow) Maksim Layushkin

25 September 2010	Zenit Saint Petersburg	6 – 1	Saturn Moscow	Saint Petersburg, Russia
15:00 MST	Kerzhakov 25', 46', 54'; Danny 32' (pen.); Lazović 34'; Zyryanov (yellow card) 42'; Bystrov (yellow card) 82'; Rosina 83'; Lombaerts (yellow card) 90'	Report	Zelão (yellow card) 38'; Kirichenko 45'; Vorobyov (yellow card) 48'; Kopúnek (yellow card) 55'; Nakhushev (yellow card) 64'; Evseev (yellow card) 86'; Angbwa (yellow card) 89'	Stadium: Petrovsky Stadium; Attendance: 20,500; Referee: (Moscow) Yuri Baskakov

3 October 2010	Spartak Nalchik	2 – 3	Zenit Saint Petersburg	Nalchik, Russia
18:30 MST	Golić 45'; Ricardo Jesus (yellow card) 65'; Gogua (yellow card) 76'; Pliev (yellow card) 85'; Vasin 89'	Report	Kerzhakov 2', 22'; Danny (yellow card) 26'; Shirokov 49'; Hubočan (yellow card) 80'	Stadium: Spartak Stadium; Attendance: 10,000; Referee: (Moscow) Sergei Karasev

16 October 2010	Zenit Saint Petersburg	2 – 0	Amkar Perm	Saint Petersburg, Russia
16:15 MST	Kerzhakov 49'; Shirokov 64' (pen.); Anyukov (yellow card) 89'	Report	Belorukov (yellow card) 22' (yellow-red card) 43'; Fedoriv (yellow card) 26' (yellow-red card) 55'; Usminskiy (yellow card) 43'; Kolomeytsev (yellow card) 63'	Stadium: Petrovsky Stadium; Attendance: 20,500; Referee: (Moscow) Evgeni Turbin

24 October 2010	Anzhi Makhachkala	3 – 3	Zenit Saint Petersburg	Makhachkala, Russia
16:30 MST	Holenda 4'; Ivanov (yellow card) 47'; Josan 80'; Gadzhibekov (yellow card) 84'; Bakayev 89'; Kļava (yellow card) 90'	Report	Danny 8', 63'; Zyryanov (yellow card) 31', (goal) 40'; Denisov (yellow card) 88'; Bukharov (yellow card) 90'	Stadium: Dinamo Stadium; Attendance: 12,000; Referee: (Moscow) Aleksandr Kolobaev

27 October 2010	Spartak Moscow	1 – 0	Zenit Saint Petersburg	Moscow, Russia
20:30 MST	Makeev (yellow card) 40'; Welliton (yellow card) 62'; Pareja (yellow card) 66'; Suchý (yellow card) 69'; D. Kombarov 88' (pen.)	Report	Danny (yellow card) 36'; Luković (yellow card) 78'; Denisov (yellow card) 90'	Stadium: Luzhniki Stadium; Attendance: 27,100; Referee: (Nizhny Novgorod Oblast) Igor Egorov

31 October 2010	Zenit Saint Petersburg	3 – 0	Alania Vladikavkaz	Saint Petersburg, Russia
14:00 MST	Lazović 16'; Kerzhakov 42', 52'	Report	Baba Collins (yellow card) 26'; Rotenberg (yellow card) 27'; Goore (yellow card) 43'; Gabulov (yellow card) 74'	Stadium: Petrovsky Stadium; Attendance: 19,500; Referee: (Moscow) Aleksei Eskov

7 November 2010	Sibir Novosibirsk	2 – 5	Zenit Saint Petersburg	Novosibirsk, Russia
14:00 MST	Nagibin 2'; Grzelak 6'; Astafyev (yellow card) 7'; Šumulikoski (yellow card) 20'; Aravin (yellow card) 72'	Report	Bystrov 13'; Joseph-Reinette 15' (o.g.); Zyryanov (yellow card) 55'; Danny 61'; Semak 63'; Anyukov 65'	Stadium: Spartak Stadium; Attendance: 12,100; Referee: (Moscow) Almir Kayumov

10 November 2010	Zenit Saint Petersburg	1 – 3	CSKA Moscow	Saint Petersburg, Russia
19:00 MST	Alves (yellow card) 82'; Anyukov (yellow card) 86'; Rosina 90'	Report	Vágner Love 14'; González 34'; Doumbia 52'; Akinfeev (yellow card) 79'; Mamaev (yellow card) 90'	Stadium: Petrovsky Stadium; Attendance: 20,500; Referee: (Moscow) Stanislav Sukhina

14 November 2010	Zenit Saint Petersburg	5 – 0	Rostov	Saint Petersburg, Russia
15:00 MST	Lazović 40' (pen.); Semak 75'; Kerzhakov 82', (yellow card) 82'; Bukharov 90', 90+'	Report	Ghionea (yellow card) 39'; Kalachev (yellow card) 39' (yellow-red card) 85'; Khagush (yellow card) 57'; Yankov (yellow card) 69'	Stadium: Petrovsky Stadium; Attendance: 20,500; Referee: (Moscow) Yuri Baskakov

20 November 2010	Rubin Kazan	2 – 2	Zenit Saint Petersburg	Kazan, Russia
14:00 MST	Sharonov (yellow card) 10'; Kuzmin (yellow card) 51'; Navas 60'; Medvedev 68'	Report	Lazović (yellow card) 6'; Fayzulin 19'; Huszti 56'; Luković (yellow card) 66'; Kerzhakov (yellow card) 74'; Shirokov (yellow card) 90'	Stadium: Central Stadium; Attendance: 12,000; Referee: (Moscow) Aleksandr Kolobaev

28 November 2010	Zenit Saint Petersburg	0 – 0	Krylia Sovetov Samara	Saint Petersburg, Russia
14:00 MST	Meira (yellow card) 50' (yellow-red card) 60'	Report	Ivanov (yellow card) 50'; Taranov (yellow card) 52'; Sosnin (yellow card) 73'; Tkachyov (yellow card) 82'	Stadium: Petrovsky Stadium; Attendance: 21 300; Referee: Igor Egorov

==== League table ====
Pos	Team	Pld	W	D	L	GF	GA	GD	Pts	Qualification or relegation
1	Zenit St. Petersburg (C)	30	20	8	2	61	21	+40	68	Qualification to Champions League group stage
2	CSKA Moscow	30	18	8	4	51	22	+29	62	Qualification to Champions League group stage
3	Rubin Kazan	30	15	13	2	37	16	+21	58	Qualification to Champions League third qualifying round
4	Spartak Moscow	30	13	10	7	43	33	+10	49	Qualification to Europa League play-off round
5	Lokomotiv Moscow	30	13	9	8	34	29	+5	48	Qualification to Europa League play-off round

Source: RFPL (in Russian)
Rules for classification: 1st points; 2nd matches won; 3rd head-to-head (points, matches won, goal difference, goals scored, away goals scored); 4th goal difference; 5th goals scored; 6th away goals scored; 7th position in previous season or decision game
(C) Champions

=== Russian Cup ===
13 July 2010 Round of 32	Dynamo Saint Petersburg	1 – 3	Zenit St.Petersburg	Saint Petersburg
19:00 MSK (UTC+4)	Zimulka (yellow card) 16'; Lobov (yellow card) 33'; Rogov 53' (pen.)	Report	Kanunnikov 16'; Anyukov (yellow card) 43'; Rosina 55', 59'; Denisov (yellow card) 82'	Stadium: Petrovsky Stadium; Attendance: 10,500; Referee: Sergey Lapochkin

The Round of 16 match against Anzhi Makhachkala took place during the 2011–12 season.

=== UEFA Champions League ===
==== Qualifying rounds ====
27 July 2010 Third qualifying round 1st leg	Unirea Urziceni (Romania)	0 – 0	(Russia) Zenit St.Petersburg	Bucharest, Romania
22:30 MSK (UTC+4)	Paraschiv (yellow card) 26'; Pădurețu (red card) 36'; Galamaz (yellow card) 41'	Report	Denisov (yellow card) 14'; Rosina (yellow card) 81'	Stadium: Stadionul Steaua; Attendance: 12,000; Referee: Bruno Paixão (Portugal)

4 August 2010 Third qualifying round 2nd leg	Zenit St.Petersburg (Russia)	1 – 0 (1 – 0 agg.)	(Romania) Unirea Urziceni	Saint Petersburg, Russia
21:30 MSK (UTC+4)	Hubočan (yellow card) 26'; Danny 33'; Shirokov (yellow card) 35'; Malafeev (yellow card) 77'; Anyukov (yellow card) 79'	Report		Stadium: Petrovsky Stadium; Attendance: 21,000; Referee: Mike Dean (England)

17 August 2010 Play-off round 1st leg	Zenit St.Petersburg (Russia)	1 – 0	(France) Auxerre	Saint Petersburg, Russia
21:30 MSK (UTC+4)	Kerzhakov 3'; Danny (yellow card) 33'	Report	Mignot (yellow card) 36'; Le Tallec (yellow card) 82'; Contout (yellow card) 87'	Stadium: Petrovsky Stadium; Attendance: 21,570; Referee: Björn Kuipers (Netherlands)

25 August 2010 Play-off round 2nd leg	Auxerre (France)	2 – 0 (2 – 1 agg.)	(Russia) Zenit St.Petersburg	Auxerre, France
23:45 MSK (UTC+4)	Hengbart 9' (yellow card) 21'; Jeleń 53'; Contout (yellow card) 79'	Report	Bystrov (yellow card) 56'; Semak (yellow card) 57'; Malafeev (red card) 65'; Hubočan (yellow card) 77' (yellow-red card) 80'; Anyukov (yellow card) 81'; Alves (yellow card) 84'	Stadium: Stade de l'Abbé-Deschamps; Attendance: 15,277; Referee: Damir Skomina (Slovenia)

=== UEFA Europa League ===
==== Group stage ====
Pos	Team	Pld	W	D	L	GF	GA	GD	Pts	Qualification	ZNT	AND	AEK	HAJ
1	(Russia) Zenit Saint Petersburg	6	6	0	0	18	6	+12	18	Advance to knockout phase	—	3–1	4–2	2–0
2	(Belgium) Anderlecht	6	2	1	3	8	8	0	7	Advance to knockout phase	1–3	—	3–0	2–0
3	(Greece) AEK Athens	6	2	1	3	9	13	−4	7		0–3	1–1	—	3–1
4	(Croatia) Hajduk Split	6	1	0	5	5	13	−8	3		2–3	1–0	1–3	—

Source: Soccerway

16 September 2010 1	Anderlecht (Belgium)	1 – 3	(Russia) Zenit St.Petersburg	Anderlecht, Belgium
23:05 MSK (UTC+4)	Juhász 66'; Bernárdez (yellow card) 78'	Report	Kerzhakov 8', 33', 44'; Alves (yellow card) 19'; Luković (yellow card) 31'	Stadium: Constant Vanden Stock Stadium; Attendance: 30,000; Referee: Manuel Gräfe (Germany)

30 September 2010 2	Zenit St.Petersburg (Russia)	4 – 2	(Greece) AEK Athens	Saint Petersburg, Russia
21:00 MSK (UTC+4)	Hubočan 1'; Alves 13'; Lazović 43' (pen.), 57'; Malafeev (yellow card) 81'	Report	Liberopoulos 37'; Nasuti (red card) 41'; Patsatzoglou (yellow card) 41'; Kafes 83' (pen.); Makos (yellow card) 84'	Stadium: Petrovsky Stadium; Attendance: 21,100; Referee: Milorad Mažić (Serbia)

21 October 2010 3	Zenit St.Petersburg (Russia)	2 – 0	(Croatia) Hajduk Split	Saint Petersburg, Russia
21:00 MSK (UTC+4)	Bukharov 25'; Danny 68'; Zyryanov (yellow card) 79'	Report	Ibričić (yellow card) 26'	Stadium: Petrovsky Stadium; Attendance: 20,200; Referee: Libor Kovařik (Czech Republic)

5 November 2010 4	Hajduk Split (Croatia)	2 – 3	(Russia) Zenit St.Petersburg	Split, Croatia
00:05 MSK (UTC+4)	Vejić (yellow card) 67'; M. Ljubičić 69'; Vukušić 82'; Maloča (yellow card) 85'; Sharbini (yellow card) 89'	Report	Ionov (yellow card) 12' (goal) 32'; Huszti 47' (pen.); Rosina 51'	Stadium: Stadion Poljud; Attendance: 30,000; Referee: Eduardo Iturralde González (Spain)

1 December 2010 5	Zenit St.Petersburg (Russia)	3 – 1	(Belgium) Anderlecht	Saint Petersburg, Russia
22:00 MSK (UTC+4)	Ionov 12'; Shirokov (yellow card) 35'; Luković (yellow card) 50'; Bukharov 65'; Lombaerts (yellow card) 75'; Huszti 88'	Report	Kljestan (yellow card) 74'; Kanu 87'	Stadium: Petrovsky Stadium; Attendance: 20,000; Referee: Marcin Borski (Poland)

17 December 2010 6	AEK Athens (Greece)	0 – 3	(Russia) Zenit St.Petersburg	Athens, Greece
00:05 MSK (UTC+4)	Manolas (yellow card) 37'; Makos (yellow card) 72'	Report	Luković (yellow card) 39'; Bukharov 43'; Rosina 67'; Denisov 88'	Stadium: Olympic Stadium; Attendance: 20,000; Referee: Saïd Ennjimi (France)

The Round of 32 match against Young Boys took place during the 2011–12 season.

== Squad statistics ==
As of match played 17 December 2010

=== Appearances and goals ===
No.	Pos	Nat	Player	Total		Premier League		2009-10 Russian Cup		2010-11 Russian Cup		UEFA Champions League		Europa League	
No.	Pos	Nat	Player	Apps	Goals	Apps	Goals	Apps	Goals	Apps	Goals	Apps	Goals	Apps	Goals
2	DF	(Russia) RUS	Aleksandr Anyukov	36	1	26+1	1	2	0	1	0	4	0	2	0
3	DF	(Portugal) POR	Bruno Alves	19	1	14	0	0	0	0	0	2	0	3	1
4	DF	(Croatia) CRO	Ivica Križanac	20	1	13+1	1	1	0	0	0	0	0	4+1	0
5	DF	(Portugal) POR	Fernando Meira	19	0	7+4	0	2	0	1	0	3	0	2	0
6	DF	(Belgium) BEL	Nicolas Lombaerts	37	3	26	3	3	0	1	0	3	0	4	0
8	FW	(Serbia) SRB	Danko Lazović	30	7	14+6	5	1+1	0	1	0	1+1	0	4+1	2
9	FW	(Russia) RUS	Aleksandr Bukharov	17	7	4+6	4	0	0	0	0	0+2	0	5	3
10	MF	(Portugal) POR	Danny	39	12	27	10	2+1	0	0+1	0	4	1	4	1
11	FW	(Russia) RUS	Aleksandr Kerzhakov	36	17	26+2	13	2+1	0	0	0	4	1	1	3
14	DF	(Slovakia) SVK	Tomáš Hubočan	33	1	23	0	3	0	0	0	4	0	2+1	1
15	MF	(Russia) RUS	Roman Shirokov	33	7	17+4	6	2+1	1	0+1	0	4	0	3+1	0
16	GK	(Russia) RUS	Vyacheslav Malafeev	31	0	21	0	2	0	0	0	4	0	4	0
17	MF	(Italy) ITA	Alessandro Rosina	25	6	5+10	2	1+2	0	1	2	0+2	0	3+1	2
18	MF	(Russia) RUS	Konstantin Zyryanov	40	2	23+5	2	2+1	0	0	0	3+1	0	4+1	0
20	MF	(Russia) RUS	Viktor Fayzulin	25	2	14+3	2	1+1	0	1	0	0+2	0	2+1	0
22	GK	(Russia) RUS	Dmitri Borodin	1	0	1	0	0	0	0	0	0	0	0	0
23	MF	(Hungary) HUN	Szabolcs Huszti	23	4	13+3	1	2	1	1	0	0+1	0	1+2	2
24	DF	(Serbia) SRB	Aleksandar Luković	17	0	10+1	0	0	0	0	0	0	0	6	0
25	MF	(Russia) RUS	Sergei Semak	17	2	10+2	2	0	0	0	0	2	0	2+1	0
27	MF	(Russia) RUS	Igor Denisov	35	1	24	0	2	0	1	0	3	0	5	1
30	GK	(Belarus) BLR	Yuri Zhevnov	13	0	8	0	1	0	1	0	0+1	0	2	0
34	MF	(Russia) RUS	Vladimir Bystrov	32	7	22+3	6	3	1	0	0	3	0	01	0
57	MF	(Russia) RUS	Aleksei Ionov	17	2	2+9	0	0	0	0+1	0	0	0	2+3	2
99	FW	(Russia) RUS	Maksim Kanunnikov	21	2	0+12	1	0+1	0	1	1	0+2	0	0+5	0
Players away from the club on loan:
28	DF	(Denmark) DEN	Michael Lumb	4	0	1+1	0	1	0	1	0	0	0	0	0
Players who left Zenit St.Petersburg during the season:

=== Goal scorers ===
Place	Position	Nation	Number	Name	Premier League	2009-10 Russian Cup	2010-11 Russian Cup	UEFA Cup	Europa League	Total
1	FW	(Russia)	11	Aleksandr Kerzhakov	13	0	0	1	3	17
2	MF	(Portugal)	10	Danny	10	0	0	1	1	12
3	MF	(Russia)	15	Roman Shirokov	6	1	0	0	0	7
3	MF	(Russia)	34	Vladimir Bystrov	6	1	0	0	0	7
3	FW	(Serbia)	8	Danko Lazović	5	0	0	0	2	7
3	FW	(Russia)	9	Aleksandr Bukharov	4	0	0	0	3	7
7	MF	(Italy)	17	Alessandro Rosina	2	0	2	0	2	6
8	MF	(Hungary)	23	Szabolcs Huszti	1	1	0	0	2	4
9	DF	(Belgium)	6	Nicolas Lombaerts	3	0	0	0	0	3
10	MF	(Russia)	25	Sergei Semak	2	0	0	0	0	2
10	MF	(Russia)	18	Konstantin Zyryanov	2	0	0	0	0	2
10	MF	(Russia)	20	Viktor Fayzulin	2	0	0	0	0	2
10	FW	(Russia)	99	Maksim Kanunnikov	1	0	1	0	0	2
10	MF	(Russia)	57	Aleksei Ionov	0	0	0	0	2	2
10				Own goal	2	0	0	0	0	2
16	DF	(Russia)	2	Aleksandr Anyukov	1	0	0	0	0	1
16	DF	(Croatia)	4	Ivica Križanac	1	0	0	0	0	1
16	DF	(Portugal)	3	Bruno Alves	0	0	0	0	1	1
16	DF	(Slovakia)	14	Tomáš Hubočan	0	0	0	0	1	1
16	MF	(Russia)	27	Igor Denisov	0	0	0	0	1	1
				TOTALS	61	3	3	2	18	87
