= Michkov =

Michkov (masculine, Russian: Мичков) or Michkova (feminine, Russian: Мичкова) is a Russian surname. Notable people with the surname include:

- Dmitri Michkov (born 1980), Russian soccer coach and former player
- Matvei Michkov (born 2004), Russian ice hockey player
