= Eugene Starikov =

American soccer player (born 1988)

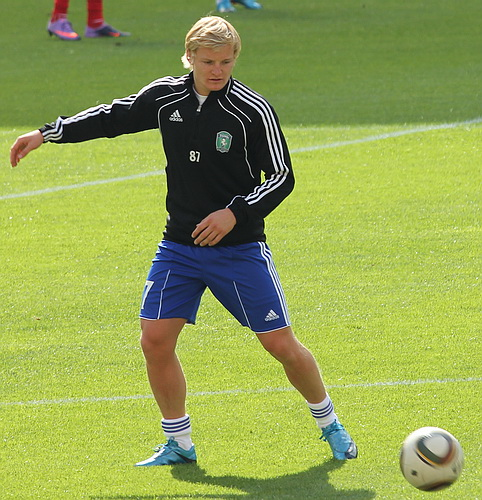

Personal information
- Birth name: Yevhen Valeriiovych Starikov
- Date of birth: November 17, 1988 (age 37)
- Place of birth: Odesa, Ukrainian SSR, Soviet Union (now Ukraine)
- Height: 5 ft 9 in (1.75 m)
- Positions: Forward; midfielder

College career
Years	Team	Apps	(Gls)
2007–2008	Stetson Hatters	22	(10)

Senior career*
Years	Team	Apps	(Gls)
2008	Bradenton Academics	12	(5)
2009–2014	Zenit Saint Petersburg	0	(0)
2010–2011	→ Tom Tomsk (loan)	30	(2)
2012–2013	→ Rostov (loan)	8	(2)
2013–2014	→ Tom Tomsk (loan)	1	(0)
2015–2016	Chornomorets Odesa	10	(2)
2017	New York Cosmos	25	(4)
2018–2019	Indy Eleven	30	(6)

International career
2012	United States U23	3	(1)
- * Club domestic league appearances and goals

Eugene Starikov (born Yevhen Valeriiovych Starikov, (Note: Ukrainian: Євген Валерійович Старіков, romanized: Yevhen Valeriiovych Starikov; Russian: Евгений Валерьевич Стариков, romanized: Yevgeny Valeryevich Starikov) November 17, 1988) is an American former professional soccer player who played as a midfielder.

== Club career ==
=== Early years ===
Starikov was born in Odesa, USSR and grew up in Huntington Beach, California where he played for Edison High School, San Diego Surf, and Irvine Strikers. He transferred to Florida before his junior year, where he was the Pinellas County scoring champion twice and led the Palm Harbor University High School Hurricanes to a victory in the 2006 FHSAA 5A Championship. He spent two years at Stetson University and played one season for the Bradenton Academics in the USL Premier Development League.

=== Professional ===
Starikov was signed by Zenit in the Russian Premier League before the 2009 season. On March 17, 2017, Starikov returned to the United States and signed for NASL side New York Cosmos. On February 6, 2018, Starikov joined the Indy Eleven of the United Soccer League.

=== International career ===
On January 7, 2011, Starikov was called up to the United States national team for a friendly game against Chile.

== Career statistics ==
As of March 30, 2019

Appearances and goals by club, season and competition
Club	Season	League			Cup (Note: Includes the U.S. Open Cup, Russian Cup (football), and Ukrainian Cup)		Continental		Other		Total	
Club	Season	Division	Apps	Goals	Apps	Goals	Apps	Goals	Apps	Goals	Apps	Goals
Bradenton Academics	2008	PDL	12	5	1	0	–		0	0	13	5
Zenit St. Petersburg	2009	Russian Premier League	0	0	0	0	0	0	–		0	0
Zenit St. Petersburg	2010	Russian Premier League	0	0	0	0	0	0	–		0	0
Zenit St. Petersburg	2011–12	Russian Premier League	0	0	0	0	0	0	0	0	0	0
Zenit St. Petersburg	2012–13	Russian Premier League	0	0	0	0	0	0	0	0	0	0
Zenit St. Petersburg	2013–14	Russian Premier League	0	0	0	0	0	0	0	0	0	0
Zenit St. Petersburg	Total		0	0	0	0	0	0	0	0	0	0
Tom Tomsk (loan)	2010	Russian Premier League	9	1	0	0	–		–		9	1
Tom Tomsk (loan)	2011–12	Russian Premier League	21	1	2	0	–		–		23	1
Tom Tomsk (loan)	Total		30	2	2	0	0	0	0	0	32	2
Rostov (loan)	2012–13	Russian Premier League	8	2	0	0	–		1 (Note: Appearance in the RPL relegation playoffs)	0	9	2
Tom Tomsk (loan)	2013–14	Russian Premier League	1	0	0	0	–		0	0	1	0
Chornomorets Odesa	2015–16	Ukrainian Premier League	10	2	1	0	–		–		11	2
New York Cosmos	2017	NASL	25	4	0	0	–		2 (Note: Appearances in the Soccer Bowl Playoffs)	0	27	4
Indy Eleven	2018	USL	19	6	0	0	–		0	0	19	6
Indy Eleven	2019	USL Championship	3	0	0	0	–		0	0	3	0
Indy Eleven	Total		22	6	0	0	0	0	0	0	22	6
Career total			108	21	4	0	0	0	3	0	115	21
