= Roman Zharikov =

Russian footballer

Personal information
- Full name: Roman Andreyevich Zharikov
- Date of birth: 25 January 1991 (age 35)
- Place of birth: Tomsk, Russia
- Height: 1.68 m (5 ft 6 in)
- Position: Forward

Senior career*
| Years | Team | Apps | (Gls) |
| 2008–2012 | FC Tom Tomsk | 0 | (0) |
| 2011 | → FC Khimik Dzerzhinsk (loan) | 0 | (0) |
- * Club domestic league appearances and goals

Roman Andreyevich Zharikov (Russian: Роман Андреевич Жариков; born 25 January 1991) is a former Russian football forward.

== Career ==
Zharikov made his professional debut for FC Tom Tomsk on 15 July 2009 in the Russian Cup game against FC Alania Vladikavkaz.
