= Konstantin Zimulka =

Russian footballer

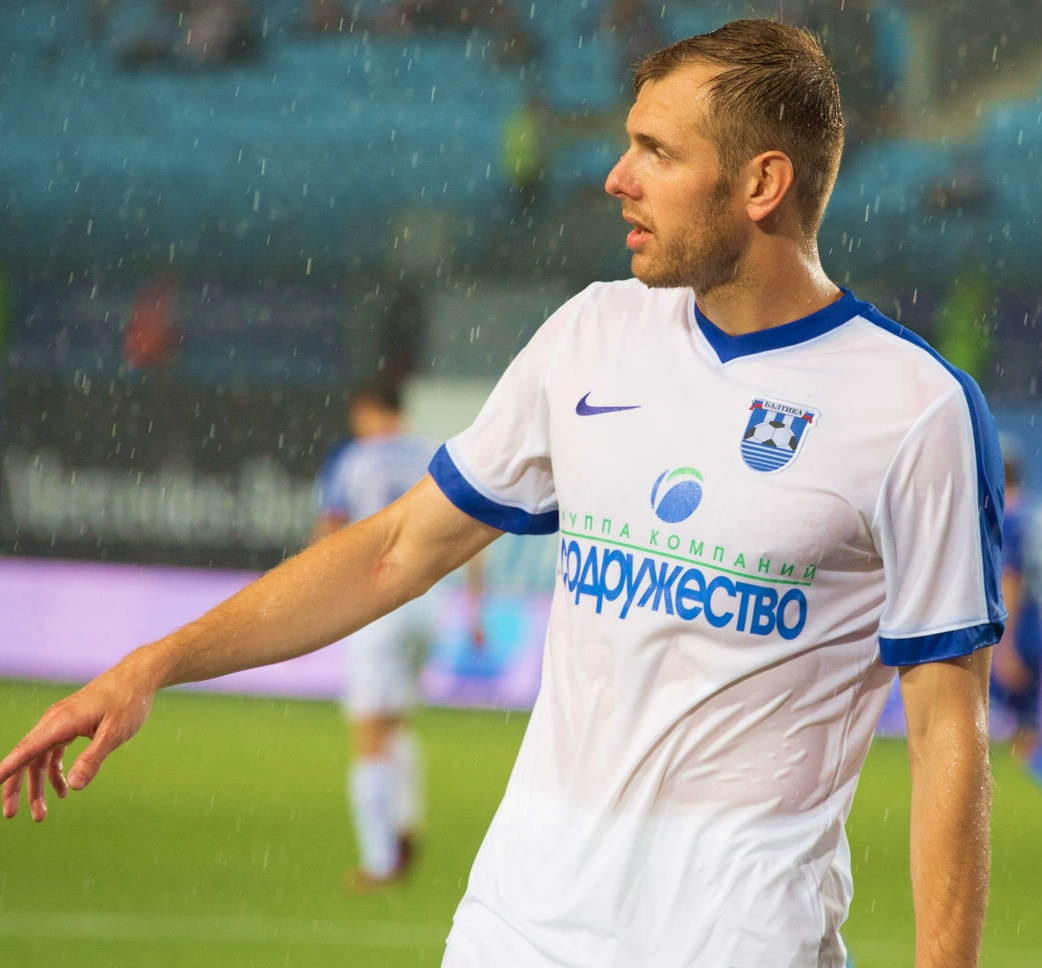
- Zimulka with Baltika in 2016

Personal information
- Full name: Konstantin Aleksandrovich Zimulka
- Date of birth: 18 November 1983 (age 42)
- Place of birth: Stavropol, Russian SFSR
- Height: 1.83 m (6 ft 0 in)
- Positions: Defender; midfielder

Senior career*
Years	Team	Apps	(Gls)
2001	FC Lokomotiv Moscow	0	(0)
2002	FC Dynamo Stavropol	1	(0)
2002–2003	FC Spartak-Kavkaztransgaz Izobilny	27	(2)
2003	FC Dynamo Stavropol	13	(0)
2004	FC Kavkaztransgaz Izobilny	21	(0)
2005–2006	FC Angusht Nazran	42	(4)
2006	FC Volga Nizhny Novgorod	12	(0)
2007–2009	FC Gazovik Orenburg	86	(6)
2010	FC Dynamo St. Petersburg	35	(3)
2011	FC Yenisey Krasnoyarsk	20	(1)
2012–2014	FC Baltika Kaliningrad	74	(6)
2014–2015	FC Luch-Energiya Vladivostok	11	(1)
2015–2016	FC Tambov	24	(1)
2016	FC Baltika Kaliningrad	18	(0)
2017	FC Syzran-2003	24	(4)
- * Club domestic league appearances and goals

Konstantin Aleksandrovich Zimulka (Russian: Константин Александрович Зимулька; born 18 November 1983) is a Russian former professional football player.

== Club career ==
He made his Russian Football National League debut for FC Angusht Nazran on 26 March 2006 in a game against FC Terek Grozny. He spent 6 more seasons in the FNL with FC Dynamo St. Petersburg, FC Yenisey Krasnoyarsk, FC Baltika Kaliningrad and FC Luch-Energiya Vladivostok.
