= Mikhail Vanyov =

Russian footballer

Personal information
- Full name: Mikhail Viktorovich Vanyov
- Date of birth: 27 November 1981 (age 44)
- Place of birth: Krasnoznamensk, Russian SFSR
- Height: 1.79 m (5 ft 10 1/2 in)
- Position: Midfielder

Senior career*
Years	Team	Apps	(Gls)
2003–2004	FC Yantar Seversk		
2004–2009	FC Tom Tomsk	4	(0)
2006	→ FC Zvezda Irkutsk (loan)	25	(1)
2007	→ FC Chita (loan)	28	(5)
2008	→ FC Dynamo Barnaul (loan)	4	(1)
2008–2009	→ FC Chita (loan)	56	(4)
2010–2015	FC Chita	130	(17)
2015	FC Belogorsk		
- * Club domestic league appearances and goals

Mikhail Viktorovich Vanyov (Russian: Михаил Викторович Ванёв; born 27 November 1981) is a former Russian professional footballer.

== Club career ==
He made his debut in the Russian Premier League in 2005 for FC Tom Tomsk.
