= Vladislav Khatazhyonkov =

Russian footballer

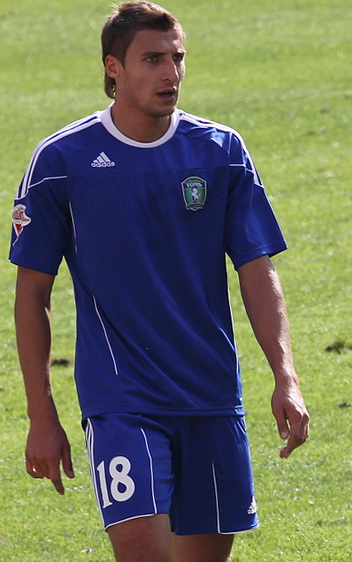

Personal information
- Full name: Vladislav Viktorovich Khatazhyonkov
- Date of birth: 2 May 1984 (age 42)
- Place of birth: Moscow, Russian SFSR
- Height: 1.84 m (6 ft 0 in)
- Position: Defender

Senior career*
| Years | Team | Apps | (Gls) |
| 2002–2005 | FC Lokomotiv Moscow | 0 | (0) |
| 2004 | → FC Titan Moscow (loan) | 29 | (0) |
| 2005 | → FC Volgar-Gazprom Astrakhan (loan) | 36 | (0) |
| 2006 | FC Khimki | 23 | (1) |
| 2007–2008 | FC Nosta Novotroitsk | 12 | (0) |
| 2008–2009 | FC SKA-Energiya Khabarovsk | 29 | (3) |
| 2009 | FC Vityaz Podolsk | 15 | (1) |
| 2010 | PFC Spartak Nalchik | 4 | (0) |
| 2010–2011 | FC Tom Tomsk | 18 | (0) |
| 2011 | FC Sibir Novosibirsk | 4 | (0) |
| 2012 | FC Volgar-Gazprom Astrakhan | 8 | (0) |
| 2012–2013 | FC Khimki | 26 | (3) |
| 2013 | FC Fakel Voronezh | 17 | (1) |
| 2014 | FC Volga Tver | 8 | (0) |
| 2016 | Riga FC | 0 | (0) |
| 2017 | FC Ararat-2 Moscow | | |
- * Club domestic league appearances and goals

Vladislav Viktorovich Khatazhyonkov (Russian: Владислав Викторович Хатажёнков; born 2 May 1984) is a Russian former professional football player.

== Club career ==
He played for the main squad of FC Lokomotiv Moscow in the Russian Premier League Cup.
