= Konstantin Sashilin =

Russian footballer

Personal information
- Full name: Konstantin Vladimirovich Sashilin
- Date of birth: April 28, 1989 (age 37)
- Place of birth: Tula, Soviet Union
- Height: 1.70 m (5 ft 7 in)
- Position: Midfielder

Team information
- Current team: FC Arsenal-2 Tula (assistant coach)

Senior career*
Years	Team	Apps	(Gls)
2007	FC Khimki	0	(0)
2008–2009	FC Tom Tomsk	0	(0)
2011–2012	FC Arsenal Tula (amateur)	34	(3)
2012–2013	FC Arsenal-2 Tula		
2013–2014	FC Khimik Novomoskovsk		

Managerial career
- 2023–: FC Arsenal-2 Tula (assistant)
- * Club domestic league appearances and goals

Konstantin Vladimirovich Sashilin (Russian: Константин Владимирович Сашилин; born 28 April 1989) is a Russian football coach and a former midfielder. He is an assistant coach with FC Arsenal-2 Tula.

== Career ==
Sashilin made his professional debut for FC Tom Tomsk on 15 July 2009 in the Russian Cup game against FC Alania Vladikavkaz.
