= Ilya Gultyaev =

Russian footballer

Ilya Gultyayev
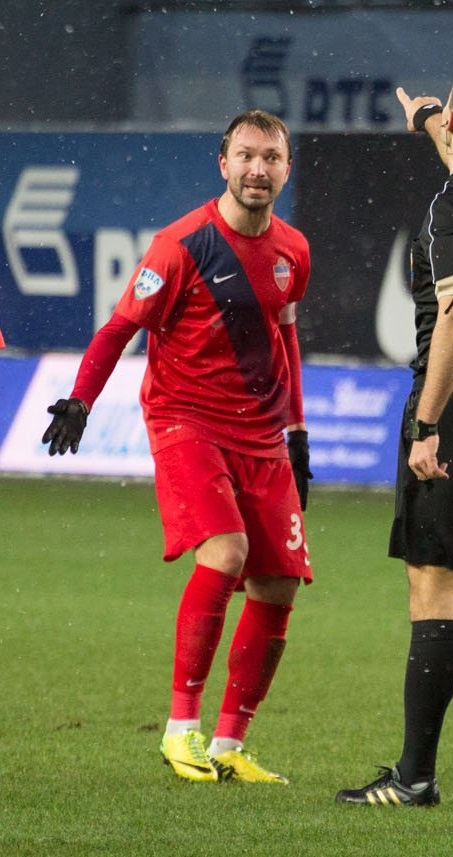
- Gultyaev with Yenisey Krasnoyarsk in 2016

Personal information
- Full name: Ilya Aleksandrovich Gultyayev
- Date of birth: 5 September 1988 (age 38)
- Place of birth: Vologda, Russian SFSR
- Height: 1.78 m (5 ft 10 in)
- Position: Centre back

Youth career
- 1994–2004: Pskov-2000
- 2004–2009: Spartak Moscow

Senior career*
Years	Team	Apps	(Gls)
2009	Spartak Moscow	0	(0)
2009–2012	Tom Tomsk	77	(2)
2013	Ufa	6	(0)
2013–2014	Neftekhimik Nizhnekamsk	21	(0)
2014–2015	Yenisey Krasnoyarsk	54	(6)
2016	Tosno	18	(0)
2016–2017	Yenisey Krasnoyarsk	25	(3)
2017–2018	Tambov	22	(3)
2018	Banants	9	(0)
2019	Gomel	18	(1)
2020–2021	Novosibirsk	17	(0)
2021–2022	Amkar Perm	17	(1)
2022–2023	Dynamo Vologda	21	(2)
2023	Kuban-Holding	0	(0)
2024	Dynamo Vologda	0	(0)

International career
2009	Russia U-21	2	(0)

Managerial career
- 2024–: SShOR Dynamo Vologda
- * Club domestic league appearances and goals as of 28 May 2024

Ilya Aleksandrovich Gultyayev (Russian: Илья́ Алекса́ндрович Гультя́ев; born 5 September 1988) is a Russian association football coach and former defender.

== Career ==
While being registered for FC Spartak Moscow since 2006, Gultyayev made his professional debut for the team on 15 July 2009, coming as a half-time substitute in the Russian Cup game against FC Krasnodar.

On 4 January 2016, Bogdan left FC Yenisey Krasnoyarsk, signing for FC Tosno.

=== Banants ===
On 5 September 2018, Gultyayev signed for FC Banants. On 6 February 2019, Banants announced that Gultyayev had left the club by mutual consent.
