= Georgi Dzhioyev =

Russian football coach and former player

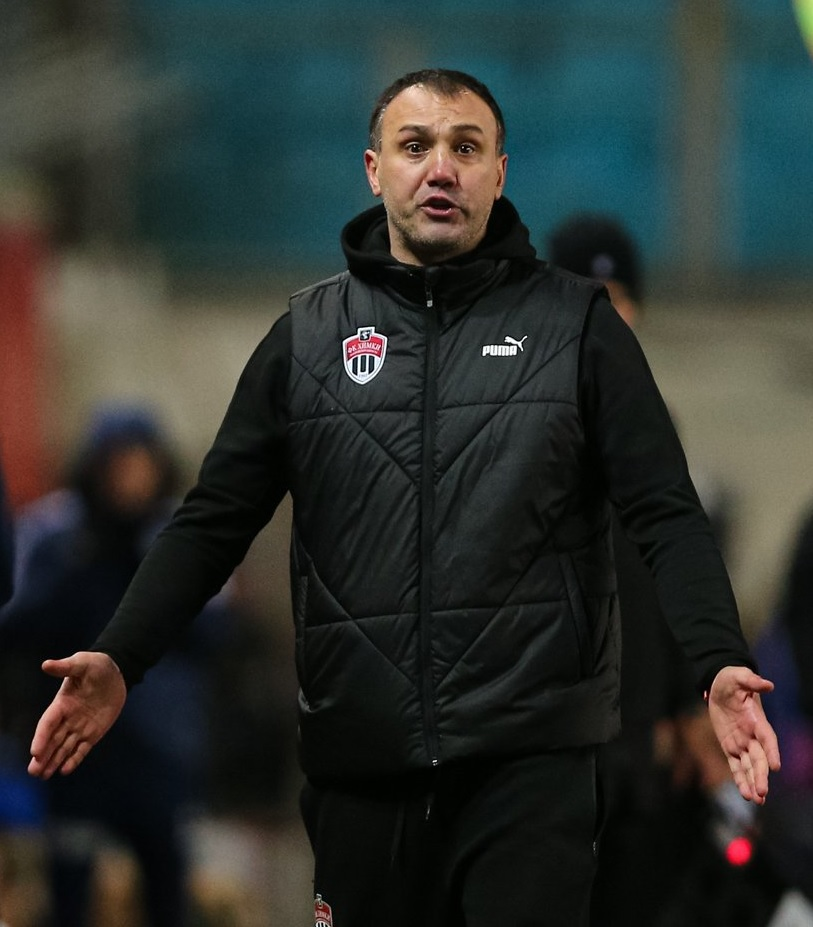
- Dzhioyev coaching Khimki in 2022

Personal information
- Full name: Georgi Guramovich Dzhioyev
- Date of birth: 13 June 1986 (age 40)
- Place of birth: Tskhinvali, Soviet Union
- Height: 1.92 m (6 ft 4 in)
- Position: Defender

Team information
- Current team: FC Alania Vladikavkaz (assistant coach)

Senior career*
| Years | Team | Apps | (Gls) |
| 2003–2005 | FC Alania Vladikavkaz | 0 | (0) |
| 2006 | FC Fakel Voronezh | 38 | (1) |
| 2007–2009 | FC Kuban Krasnodar | 55 | (5) |
| 2007 | → FC Rostov (loan) | 3 | (0) |
| 2010 | FC Tom Tomsk | 20 | (1) |
| 2011 | FC Zhemchuzhina-Sochi | 3 | (0) |
| 2011–2012 | FC Amkar Perm | 1 | (0) |
| 2013–2014 | FC Luch-Energiya Vladivostok | 30 | (3) |
| 2015–2016 | FC Tom Tomsk | 17 | (1) |

Managerial career
- 2019–2022: FC Alania Vladikavkaz (assistant)
- 2022–2023: FC Khimki (assistant)
- 2024–: FC Alania Vladikavkaz (assistant)
- * Club domestic league appearances and goals

Georgi Guramovich Dzhioyev (Russian: Георгий Гурамович Джиоев; born 13 June 1986) is a Russian football coach and former player who is an assistant coach with FC Alania Vladikavkaz.

== Club career ==
He made his debut in the Russian Premier League in 2007 for FC Rostov.

In December 2009, his contract with FC Kuban Krasnodar expired and on 29 December 2009 he joined FC Tom Tomsk.

Playing for Kuban he was runner-up of the Russian First Division in 2008.
