= Ilya Vakhrushev =

Russian footballer

Personal information
- Full name: Ilya Olegovich Vakhrushev
- Date of birth: 3 May 1989 (age 37)
- Height: 1.74 m (5 ft 8 1/2 in)
- Position: Defender

Senior career*
Years	Team	Apps	(Gls)
2007	FC Zvezda-Rekord Irkutsk		
2008	FC Zvezda Irkutsk	4	(0)
2009	FC Tom Tomsk	0	(0)
2010–2013	FC Baikal Irkutsk	37	(0)
2014	FC IrAero Irkutsk		
- * Club domestic league appearances and goals

Ilya Olegovich Vakhrushev (Russian: Илья Олегович Вахрушев; born 3 May 1989) is a former Russian professional footballer.

== Club career ==
He played in the Russian Football National League for FC Zvezda Irkutsk in 2008.

He made his only appearance for the senior squad of FC Tom Tomsk on 15 July 2009 in a Russian Cup game against FC Alania Vladikavkaz.
