= Aleksei Sazonov =

Russian footballer

Personal information
- Full name: Aleksei Fyodorovich Sazonov
- Date of birth: 21 July 1992 (age 34)
- Place of birth: Tomsk, Russia
- Height: 1.76 m (5 ft 9 in)
- Positions: Forward; midfielder

Senior career*
Years	Team	Apps	(Gls)
2010–2013	FC Tom Tomsk	7	(0)
2013–2014	FC Syzran-2003 Syzran	8	(1)
2014–2016	FC Tom-2 Tomsk	37	(8)
2016–2017	FC Chelyabinsk	22	(7)
2017	FC Nosta Novotroitsk	16	(4)
2018–2019	FC Tekstilshchik Ivanovo	26	(2)
2019	FC Chelyabinsk	1	(0)
- * Club domestic league appearances and goals

Aleksei Fyodorovich Sazonov (Russian: Алексей Фёдорович Сазонов; born 21 July 1992) is a Russian former professional football player.

== Club career ==
He made his Russian Premier League debut for FC Tom Tomsk on 12 March 2012 in a game against FC Volga Nizhny Novgorod.
