= Dmitri Matviyenko =

Russian footballer

Personal information
- Full name: Dmitri Aleksandrovich Matviyenko
- Date of birth: 25 August 1989 (age 37)
- Height: 1.91 m (6 ft 3 in)
- Position: Defender

Youth career
- DYuSSh-7 Irkutsk

Senior career*
Years	Team	Apps	(Gls)
2007	FC Zvezda-Rekord Irkutsk		
2008	FC Zvezda Irkutsk	14	(0)
2009	FC Tom Tomsk	0	(0)
2010	FC Radian-Baikal Irkutsk	4	(0)
2010–2011	FC Zenit-Rekord Irkutsk (amateur)		
2011–2012	FC Baikal Irkutsk	7	(1)
2014	FC IrAero Irkutsk		
- * Club domestic league appearances and goals

Dmitri Aleksandrovich Matviyenko (Russian: Дмитрий Александрович Матвиенко; born 25 August 1989) is a former Russian professional footballer.

== Club career ==
He played in the Russian Football National League for FC Zvezda Irkutsk in 2008.
