= Đorđe Jokić =

Serbian footballer

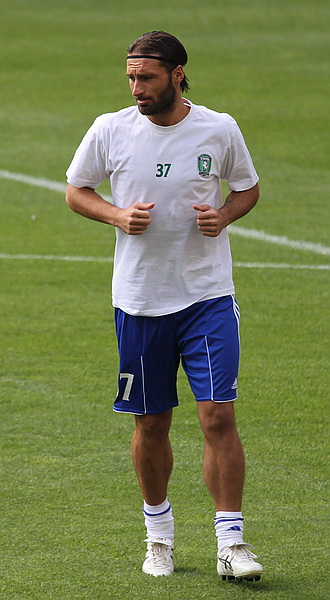
- Jokić warming up with Tom in 2010

Personal information
- Full name: Đorđe Jokić
- Date of birth: 20 January 1981 (age 45)
- Place of birth: Raška, SFR Yugoslavia
- Height: 1.81 m (5 ft 11 in)
- Position: Defender

Senior career*
Years	Team	Apps	(Gls)
1998–2000	Bane	38	(2)
2000–2004	OFK Beograd	111	(4)
2005–2007	Torpedo Moscow	72	(3)
2008–2011	Tom Tomsk	102	(9)
2012	Dynamo Bryansk	6	(0)
2012–2013	Vojvodina	20	(0)
Total		349	(18)

International career
2002–2004	Serbia and Montenegro U21	14	(0)
2004	Serbia and Montenegro U23	3	(0)
2004–2005	Serbia and Montenegro	4	(0)
Medal record
Silver medal – second place	UEFA Under-21 Championship	2004
- * Club domestic league appearances and goals

Đorđe Jokić (Serbian Cyrillic: Ђорђе Јокић; born 20 January 1981) is a Serbian former professional footballer. He played as a defender most of career.

== Club career ==
Jokić began playing football with Bane, before transferring to OFK Beograd in the 2000–01 season. In early 2005, Jokić moved to Russia and signed a three-year contract with Torpedo Moscow.

On 14 July 2012, Jokić signed a two-year contract with Vojvodina.

== International career ==
Jokić was a member of the team that represented Serbia and Montenegro at the 2004 Summer Olympics. They exited after the first round, finishing fourth in their group behind Argentina, Australia and Tunisia.

Jokić also made four appearances for the Serbia and Montenegro national team between 2004 and 2005.

== Career statistics ==
=== Club ===
Season	Club	Division	Apps	Goals
Russia
2005	Torpedo Moscow	D1	29	0
2006	Torpedo Moscow	D1	20	2
2007	Torpedo Moscow	D2	23	1
2008	Tom Tomsk	D1	28	3
2009	Tom Tomsk	D1	27	3
2010	Tom Tomsk	D1	25	1
2011–12	Tom Tomsk	D1	22	2
2011–12	Dynamo Bryansk	D2	6	0
Serbia
2012–13	Vojvodina	D1	20	0
Russia			180	12
Serbia			20	0
Total			200	12

=== International ===
Serbia and Montenegro
Year	Apps	Goals
2004	2	0
2005	2	0
Total	4	0
