= Sergey Voronov (footballer) =

Russian footballer

Personal information
- Full name: Sergey Sergeyevich Voronov
- Date of birth: 10 November 1988 (age 38)
- Height: 1.86 m (6 ft 1 in)
- Position: Forward

Senior career*
Years	Team	Apps	(Gls)
2008–2010	FC Tom Tomsk	0	(0)
2010	→ FC KUZBASS Kemerovo (loan)	30	(9)
2011–2012	FC KUZBASS Kemerovo	34	(4)
2012–2013	FC Smena Komsomolsk-na-Amure	27	(2)
2013	FC Sibiryak Bratsk	15	(0)
- * Club domestic league appearances and goals

Sergey Sergeyevich Voronov (Russian: Сергей Сергеевич Воронов; born 10 November 1988) is a former Russian football forward.

== Career ==
Voronov made his professional debut for FC Tom Tomsk on 15 July 2009 in the Russian Cup game against FC Alania Vladikavkaz.
