= Valeri Klimov (footballer) =

Russian footballer

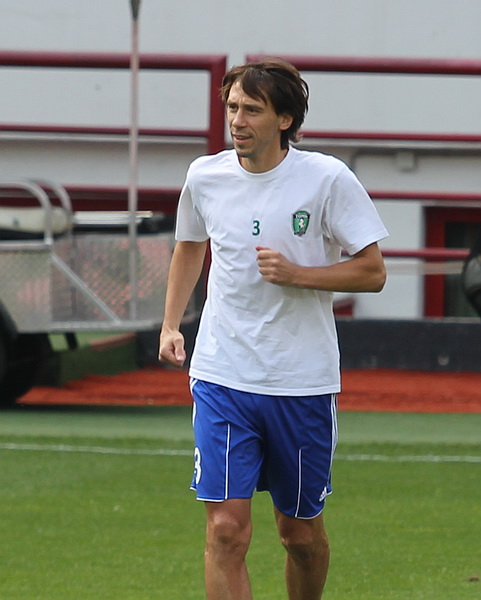

Personal information
- Full name: Valeri Aleksandrovich Klimov
- Date of birth: 31 January 1974 (age 52)
- Place of birth: Polevyye Lokotsy, Russian SFSR
- Height: 1.88 m (6 ft 2 in)
- Position: Midfielder

Team information
- Current team: FC Fakel Voronezh (assistant coach)

Youth career
- SDYuShOR-3 Oryol

Senior career*
Years	Team	Apps	(Gls)
1991–1992	FC Spartak Oryol	19	(1)
1992	FC Gornyak	11	(2)
1993–1994	FC Oryol	53	(22)
1995	FC Torpedo Moscow	14	(2)
1996	FC Alania Vladikavkaz	6	(1)
1996–1999	FC Arsenal Tula	99	(27)
2000–2001	FC Torpedo-ZIL Moscow	58	(13)
2002	FC Rubin Kazan	13	(3)
2003–2004	FC Arsenal Tula	65	(13)
2005–2012	FC Tom Tomsk	175	(20)
2012	FC Torpedo Moscow	2	(0)

Managerial career
- 2011–2012: FC Tom Tomsk (assistant)
- 2014–2016: FC Tom Tomsk (assistant)
- 2017–2019: FC Baltika Kaliningrad (assistant)
- 2019–2020: FC Arsenal Tula (assistant)
- 2020–2022: FC Khimki (assistant)
- 2022–2023: FC Fakel Voronezh (assistant)
- 2023–2024: FC Lokomotiv Moscow (assistant)
- 2024–: FC Fakel Voronezh (assistant)
- * Club domestic league appearances and goals

Valeri Aleksandrovich Klimov (Russian: Валерий Александрович Климов; born 31 January 1974) is a Russian professional football coach and a former player who is an assistant coach with FC Fakel Voronezh. Klimov was a midfielder who could play either in the centre or on the wings.

== Personal life ==
His older son Nikita was a footballer before retiring due to injuries, and his younger son Kirill Klimov is also a footballer.

== Career statistics ==
As of 22 July 2010

Club	Div	Season	League		Cup		Europe		Total	
Club	Div	Season	Apps	Goals	Apps	Goals	Apps	Goals	Apps	Goals
(Soviet Union) Spartak Oryol	D4	1991	8	0	0	0	—		8	0
(Russia) Spartak Oryol	D3	1992	11	1	0	0	—		11	1
(Russia) FC Oryol	D3	1993	26	5	1	0	—		27	5
(Russia) FC Oryol	D4	1994	27	17	1	0	—		28	17
(Russia) FC Oryol	Total		72	23	2	0	0	0	74	23
(Russia) Torpedo-d Moscow	D4	1995	16	4	0	0	—		16	4
(Russia) Torpedo-d Moscow	Total		16	4	0	0	0	0	16	4
(Russia) Torpedo Moscow	D1	1995	14	2	1	0	—		15	2
(Russia) Torpedo Moscow	Total		14	2	1	0	0	0	15	2
(Russia) Alania Vladikavkaz	D1	1996	6	1	0	0	—		6	1
(Russia) Alania Vladikavkaz	Total		6	1	0	0	0	0	6	1
(Russia) Arsenal Tula	D3	1996	11	0	0	0	—		11	0
(Russia) Arsenal Tula	D3	1997	23	7	3	3	—		26	10
(Russia) Arsenal Tula	D2	1998	31	12	4	3	—		35	15
(Russia) Arsenal Tula	D2	1999	34	8	3	2	—		37	10
(Russia) Arsenal Tula	Total		99	27	10	8	0	0	109	35
(Russia) Torpedo-ZIL Moscow	D2	2000	32	8	0	0	—		32	8
(Russia) Torpedo-ZIL Moscow	D1	2001	26	5	2	0	—		28	5
(Russia) Torpedo-ZIL Moscow	Total		58	13	2	0	0	0	60	13
(Russia) Rubin Kazan	D2	2002	13	3	0	0	—		13	3
(Russia) Rubin Kazan	Total		13	3	0	0	0	0	13	3
(Russia) Arsenal Tula	D3	2003	32	11	6	3	—		38	14
(Russia) Arsenal Tula	D2	2004	33	2	0	0	—		33	2
(Russia) Arsenal Tula	Total		65	13	6	3	0	0	71	16
(Russia) Tom Tomsk	D1	2005	27	4	0	0	—		27	4
(Russia) Tom Tomsk	D1	2006	26	4	0	0	—		26	4
(Russia) Tom Tomsk	D1	2007	29	4	1	0	—		30	4
(Russia) Tom Tomsk	D1	2008	28	2	4	1	—		32	3
(Russia) Tom Tomsk	D1	2009	24	5	1	0	—		25	5
(Russia) Tom Tomsk	D1	2010	11	1	1	0	—		12	1
(Russia) Tom Tomsk	Total		145	20	7	1	0	0	152	21
Career total			488	106	28	12	0	0	516	118
