= Maksim Layushkin =

Russian footballer and referee

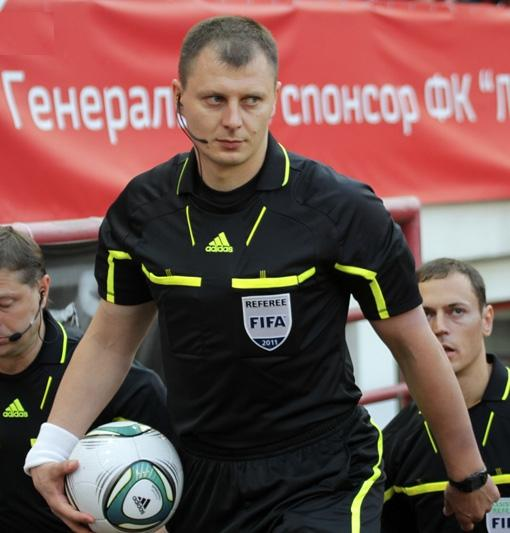
- Layushkin in 2011 refereeing Lokomotiv - Spartak game

Personal information
- Full name: Maksim Viktorovich Layushkin
- Date of birth: 22 August 1972 (age 54)
- Place of birth: Moscow, Russian SFSR
- Height: 1.85 m (6 ft 1 in)
- Positions: Defender; midfielder

Youth career
- FC Dynamo Moscow

Senior career*
Years	Team	Apps	(Gls)
1989–1991	FC Dynamo-2 Moscow	55	(6)
1992–1994	FC Dynamo-d Moscow	77	(9)
1993	FC Dynamo Moscow	1	(0)
1995	FC Dynamo-Gazovik Tyumen	13	(0)
1996–1997	FC Luch Vladivostok	38	(3)
1998–1999	FC Mosenergo Moscow	34	(1)
- * Club domestic league appearances and goals

Maksim Viktorovich Layushkin (Russian: Максим Викторович Лаюшкин; born 22 August 1972) is a former Russian professional football player and referee.

== Club career ==
As a player, he made his professional debut in the Soviet Second League in 1989 for FC Dynamo-2 Moscow.

== Referee ==
Layushkin became a FIFA referee in 2009. He retired as a referee in 2014.

== Honours ==
- Russian Premier League bronze: 1993.
