= Eduard Malyi =

Russian footballer and referee

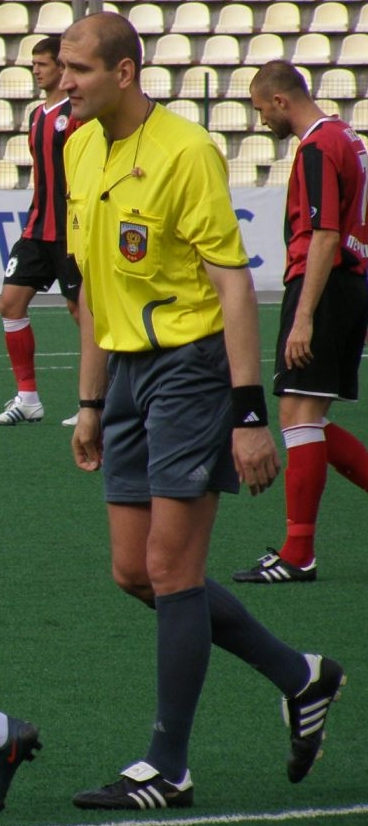

Personal information
- Full name: Eduard Yevgenyevich Malyi
- Date of birth: 24 May 1969 (age 57)
- Height: 1.93 m (6 ft 4 in)
- Position: Goalkeeper

Senior career*
Years	Team	Apps	(Gls)
1990	FC Avangard Kursk	7	(0)
1991	FC Rotor Volgograd	3	(0)
1992	FC Vorskla Poltava	0	(0)
1992	FC Rotor Volgograd	11	(0)
1992	→ FC Rotor-d Volgograd (loan)	10	(0)
- * Club domestic league appearances and goals

Eduard Yevgenyevich Malyi (Russian: Эдуард Евгеньевич Малый; born 24 May 1969) is a former Russian football player and referee.

== Referee career ==
Assistant referee

- Russian Third League: 1996–1997
- Russian Second Division: 1997–2001
- Russian First Division: 1997–2000
- Russian Top Division: 2000–2001

Referee

- Russian Third League: 1997
- Russian Second Division: 1998–2011
- Russian Football National League: 2000–2012
- Russian Football Premier League: 2005–2012
