= Roman Shirokov =

Russian footballer (born 1981)

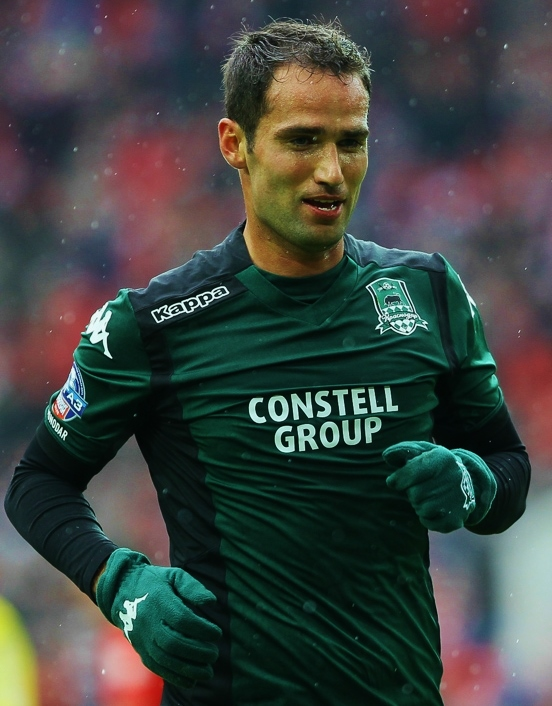
- Shirokov with FC Krasnodar in 2015

Personal information
- Full name: Roman Nikolayevich Shirokov
- Date of birth: 6 July 1981 (age 45)
- Place of birth: Dedovsk, Moscow Oblast, Russian SFSR, Soviet Union
- Height: 1.83 m (6 ft 0 in)
- Position: Midfielder

Youth career
- 1986–1987: Torpedo Moscow
- 1987–1998: CSKA Moscow

Senior career*
Years	Team	Apps	(Gls)
1998–2000	CSKA-2 Moscow	54	(3)
2001	CSKA Moscow	0	(0)
2001	Torpedo-ZIL Moscow	1	(0)
2002–2003	Istra		
2004	Vidnoye	17	(4)
2004	Istra		
2005	Saturn Ramenskoye	18	(3)
2006	Rubin Kazan	4	(0)
2007	Khimki	27	(7)
2008–2014	Zenit Saint Petersburg	130	(29)
2014	→ Krasnodar (loan)	6	(3)
2014–2015	Spartak Moscow	19	(1)
2015	→ Krasnodar (loan)	13	(4)
2016	CSKA Moscow	8	(0)
Total		297	(54)

International career
2008–2016	Russia	57	(13)

Managerial career
- 2023: Leon Saturn Ramenskoye (caretaker)
- * Club domestic league appearances and goals

Roman Nikolayevich Shirokov (Russian: Роман Николаевич Широ́ков [rɐˈman nʲɪkɐˈlajɪvʲɪtɕ ʂɨˈrokəf]; born 6 July 1981) is a Russian international football official and a former player.

As a player, he played as a midfielder.

== Club career ==
=== Early career ===
Before signing for Zenit Saint Petersburg, Shirokov played for FC Khimki, Rubin Kazan, Saturn Moscow Oblast, FC Vidnoye, FC Istra, Torpedo-ZIL Moscow and CSKA Moscow's farm club.

=== Zenit Saint Petersburg ===
Shirokov started his first season for Zenit Saint Petersburg as a centre-back, as then-head coach Dick Advocaat was forced to fill the gaps left in the centre of defence after the departure of Martin Škrtel to Liverpool and severe injury to Nicolas Lombaerts.

=== Spartak Moscow ===
On 18 July 2014, it was announced that Shirokov had signed a contract with Spartak Moscow as a free agent. After a long recovery from an injury he made his debut for Spartak on 26 October 2014 in a game against Lokomotiv Moscow, scoring a late equalizer in a 1–1 game. On 13 January 2015, he was loaned back to FC Krasnodar.

Shirokov was benched during the 2015–16 season, in order to not pay him the amount due to him by contract if he plays a certain number of minutes. The President of the RFU, Vitaly Mutko, commented: "He's one of the best footballers in our country. I don't understand why he's not playing. If it's due to the contract clause that's just dishonest." On 23 January 2016, his Spartak contract was dissolved by mutual consent.

=== CSKA Moscow ===
On 9 February 2016, he returned to his first club, CSKA Moscow, signing a contract until the end of the 2015–16 season with an extension option. His contract was not extended at the end of the season.

== International career ==
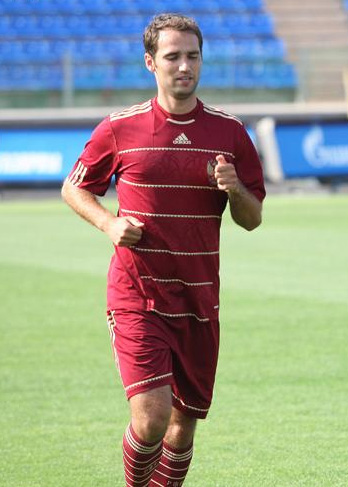
Shirokov preparing for a friendly against Bulgaria in August 2010

He was called up for the Euro 2008 and started in the opening group match against Spain, being deployed in the centre of defence as then-manager of Russia Guus Hiddink decided to follow the footsteps of his compatriot Advocaat, thus relegating experienced Sergey Ignashevich to the bench. This move proved unsuccessful as Russia were beaten 1–4 with Shirokov at fault on the number of occasions, including Spaniards' first and third goals. After the game Hiddink slammed his team's performance in defence and revamped the squad, leaving Shirokov out of the first team for the rest of the tournament.

After a string of assuring performances in the centre of Zenit's midfield, he was called back to the national team in 2010 for a friendly against Bulgaria. He was confirmed for the finalized UEFA Euro 2012 squad on 25 May 2012. He scored the second goal of Russia's opening game of this tournament against the Czech Republic in a 4–1 win.

On 2 June 2014, he was included in Russia's 2014 FIFA World Cup squad. He was excluded from the squad on 6 June due to injury.

== Style of play ==
Shirokov was described as "a deep-lying midfielder with an aptitude for getting forward to score goals".

== Post-playing career ==
On 5 June 2018, Shirokov was appointed by Dynamo Moscow as the deputy general director in charge of sports. He left Dynamo on 1 May 2019. During an amateur game in August 2020 he attacked a referee with punches to his face and kicks once he had knocked the referee to the ground, causing the referee to be hospitalized for three weeks. He was reported to the police for assault. He was tried and found guilty by a Moscow court. He was sentenced to 100 hours of community service. He was also suspended by his employer, Match TV. On 2 March 2022, Shirokov supported the Russian invasion of Ukraine, adding that those Russians, who are ashamed of the war, were welcome to leave the country.

On 6 March 2023, Shirokov was appointed general director of Saturn Ramenskoye. On 31 August 2023, he took over as the club head coach as well.

== Career statistics ==
=== Club ===
As of 9 April 2016

Appearances and goals by club, season and competition
Club	Season	League		Cup		Europe		Other		Total	
Club	Season	Apps	Goals	Apps	Goals	Apps	Goals	Apps	Goals	Apps	Goals
Istra	2003	29	29	0	0	–		–		29	29
Vidnoye	2004	17	14	3	1	–		–		20	15
Istra	2004	6	8	0	0	–		–		6	8
Saturn Ramenskoye	2005	18	3	6	2	–		–		24	5
Rubin Kazan	2006	4	0	1	0	–		–		5	0
Khimki	2007	27	7	2	2	–		–		29	9
Zenit Saint Petersburg	2008	27	3	0	0	10	0	2 (Note: One appearance in Russian Super Cup, one appearance in UEFA Super Cup)	0	39	3
Zenit Saint Petersburg	2009	21	1	2	0	5	0	0	0	28	1
Zenit Saint Petersburg	2010	21	6	4	1	12	2	–		37	9
Zenit Saint Petersburg	2011–12	26	9	4	0	8	5	1 (Note: One appearance in Russian Super Cup)	0	39	14
Zenit Saint Petersburg	2012–13	25	5	3	0	10	1	1	0	39	6
Zenit Saint Petersburg	2013–14	10	5	1	0	8	5	–		19	10
Zenit Saint Petersburg	Total	130	29	14	1	53	13	4	0	201	43
Krasnodar (loan)	2013–14	6	3	2	0	0	0	–		8	3
Spartak Moscow	2014–15	5	1	1	0	–		–		6	1
Spartak Moscow	2015–16	14	0	0	0	–		–		14	0
Spartak Moscow	Total	19	1	1	0	0	0	0	0	20	1
Krasnodar (loan)	2014–15	13	4	0	0	0	0	–		13	4
CSKA Moscow	2015–16	8	0	1	1	0	0	–		9	1
Career total		222	47	27	6	53	13	4	0	306	66

=== International ===
Scores and results list Russia's goal tally first, score column indicates score after each Shirokov goal.

List of international goals scored by Roman Shirokov
No.	Date	Venue	Opponent	Score	Result	Competition
1	2010-08-11	Petrovsky Stadium, Saint Petersburg, Russia	Bulgaria	1–0	1–0	Friendly
2	2010-10-08	Aviva Stadium, Dublin, Ireland	Republic of Ireland	3–0	3–2	UEFA Euro 2012 qualifying
3	2011-11-11	Karaiskakis Stadium, Piraeus, Greece	Greece	1–0	1–1	Friendly
4	2012-02-29	Parken Stadium, Copenhagen, Denmark	Denmark	1–0	2–0	Friendly
5	2012-06-01	Letzigrund, Zürich, Switzerland	Italy	2–0	3–0	Friendly
6	2012-06-01	Letzigrund, Zurich, Switzerland	Italy	3–0	3–0	Friendly
7	2012-06-08	Municipal Stadium, Wrocław, Poland	Czech Republic	2–0	4–1	UEFA Euro 2012
8	2012-09-07	Lokomotiv Stadium, Moscow, Russia	Northern Ireland	2–0	2–0	2014 FIFA World Cup qualification
9	2012-10-16	Luzhniki Stadium, Moscow, Russia	Azerbaijan	1–0	1–0	2014 FIFA World Cup qualification
10	2012-11-14	Kuban Stadium, Krasnodar, Russia	United States	2–1	2–2	Friendly
11	2013-02-06	Estadio Municipal de Marbella, Marbella, Spain	Iceland	1–0	2–0	Friendly
12	2013-10-11	Bakcell Arena, Baku, Azerbaijan	Azerbaijan	1–0	1–1	2014 FIFA World Cup qualification
13	2015-11-14	Kuban Stadium, Krasnodar, Russia	Portugal	1–0	1–0	Friendly

== Honours ==
Zenit Saint Petersburg

- UEFA Cup: 2007–08
- UEFA Super Cup: 2008
- Russian Premier League: 2008, 2011–12
- Russian Cup: 2009–10
- Russian Super Cup: 2008, 2011

CSKA Moscow

- Russian Premier League: 2015–16

Russia

- UEFA European Football Championship bronze medal: 2008

Individual

- List of 33 top players of the Russian league: 2013–14 (best central midfielder).
