= Aleksandr Kharitonov (footballer) =

Russian footballer

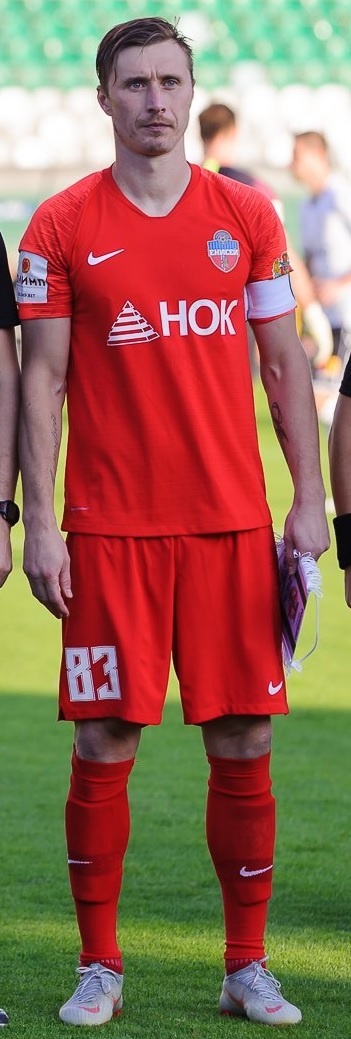
- Kharitonov with Yenisey Krasnoyarsk in 2019

Personal information
- Full name: Aleksandr Nikolayevich Kharitonov
- Date of birth: 4 April 1983 (age 43)
- Place of birth: Krasnoyarsk, USSR
- Height: 1.80 m (5 ft 11 in)
- Position: Midfielder

Youth career
- –1999: FC Metallurg Krasnoyarsk

Senior career*
Years	Team	Apps	(Gls)
2000–2002	FC Metallurg Krasnoyarsk	39	(2)
2002–2004	FC Tom Tomsk	63	(7)
2005–2008	FC Saturn Ramenskoye	29	(1)
2006	→ FC Khimki (loan)	4	(0)
2008	→ FC Tom Tomsk (loan)	15	(1)
2009–2011	FC Tom Tomsk	76	(8)
2012–2013	FC Volga Nizhny Novgorod	35	(1)
2013–2015	FC Yenisey Krasnoyarsk	44	(4)
2015–2016	FC Sibir Novosibirsk	30	(5)
2016–2021	FC Yenisey Krasnoyarsk	47	(6)

International career
2005	Russia U-21	5	(1)
- * Club domestic league appearances and goals

Aleksandr Nikolayevich Kharitonov (Russian: Александр Николаевич Харитонов; born 4 April 1983) is a Russian former footballer who played as a left midfielder or centre midfielder.

== Club career ==
He made his Russian Premier League debut for FC Saturn Ramenskoye on 13 March 2005 in a game against FC Rubin Kazan.
