= Dmitri Michkov =

Russian footballer

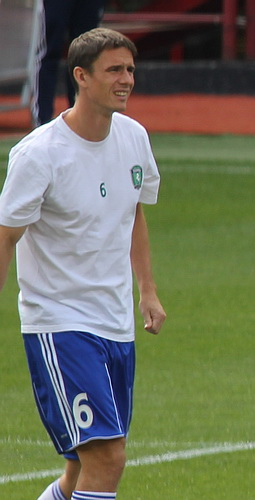

Personal information
- Full name: Dmitri Vyacheslavovich Michkov
- Date of birth: 22 January 1980 (age 46)
- Place of birth: Klimovsk, Russian SFSR
- Height: 1.82 m (5 ft 11 1/2 in)
- Position: Midfielder

Team information
- Current team: Chelyabinsk (assistant coach)

Senior career*
Years	Team	Apps	(Gls)
1997–1998	FC Sportakademklub Moscow	41	(9)
1999–2001	K.R.C. Harelbeke	25	(4)
2001	FC Fakel Voronezh	8	(0)
2002	Servette FC	23	(2)
2003–2004	FC Rubin Kazan	5	(0)
2004	FC SKA-Energia Khabarovsk	18	(2)
2005	FC Vityaz Podolsk	12	(1)
2006	PFC Spartak Nalchik	28	(0)
2007–2010	FC Tom Tomsk	101	(7)
2011	FC Krasnodar	0	(0)
2011–2012	FC Shinnik Yaroslavl	26	(0)
2012–2013	FC Vityaz Podolsk	2	(0)
2013	FC Shinnik Yaroslavl	8	(0)
2013	FC Fakel Voronezh	16	(0)

International career
2000–2001	Russia U-21	5	(1)

Managerial career
- 2019–2021: Torpedo Moscow (analyst)
- 2021: Torpedo Moscow (assistant)
- 2021–2024: Baltika Kaliningrad (assistant)
- 2025–: Chelyabinsk (assistant)
- * Club domestic league appearances and goals

Dmitri Vyacheslavovich Michkov (Russian: Дмитрий Вячеславович Мичков; born 22 January 1980) is a Russian football coach and a former footballer who is an assistant coach with Chelyabinsk.

== Playing career ==
On 19 December he moved from FC Tom Tomsk to FC Rubin Kazan which was confirmed by Rubin official website. But later the transfer fell through.

== Coaching career ==
After retiring as a player, Michkov went into coaching work and is the analyst at Baltika Kaliningrad.
