= 2011–12 FC Rotor Volgograd season =

Rotor Volgograd
2011–12 season
- Chairman: Sergei Nechay
- Manager: Valeri Burlachenko
- Stadium: Tsentralniy, Volgograd
- Second Division: 1st in zone South
- Russian Cup: Fourth round vs Torpedo Armavir
- Top goalscorer: League: Viktor Borisov (9); Roman Smolskiy (9); All: Viktor Borisov (9); Roman Smolskiy (9)
- Highest home attendance: 12,000
- Lowest home attendance: 1,500
- Average home league attendance: 5,806
Home colours	Away colours

The 2011–12 Rotor Volgograd season was the 6th season that the club played in the Russian Second Division.

== Squad ==
Note: Flags indicate national team as defined under FIFA eligibility rules; some limited exceptions apply. Players may hold more than one non-FIFA nationality.

No.	Pos.	Nation	Player
1	GK	RUS	Aleksandr Malyshev
2	DF	RUS	Ilya Ionov
3	DF	RUS	Nikolai Olenikov
4	MF	RUS	Sergei Shudrov
5	DF	RUS	Dmitri Guz
7	FW	RUS	Viktor Borisov
8	MF	RUS	Maksim Primak
9	MF	RUS	Aleksandr Nechayev
10	DF	RUS	Stepan Ryabokon
11	FW	RUS	Sergei Shumilin
12	MF	RUS	Ivan Gerasimov
13	DF	RUS	Roman Semyakin

No.	Pos.	Nation	Player
16	GK	RUS	Valeri Polyakov
18	FW	RUS	Roman Smolskiy
19	FW	RUS	Vladislav Khrushchak
21	MF	RUS	Vyacheslav Sostin
22	MF	RUS	Nikita Glushkov
23	MF	RUS	Denis Arlashin
26	MF	RUS	Nikolai Fiyev
27	DF	RUS	Mikhail Merkulov
33	GK	RUS	Aleksandr Bondar
38	MF	RUS	Oleg Aleynik
44	MF	RUS	Sergei Rashevsky
74	FW	RUS	Denis Zubko (captain)

== Transfers ==
=== Winter 2010–11 ===
In: Note: Flags indicate national team as defined under FIFA eligibility rules; some limited exceptions apply. Players may hold more than one non-FIFA nationality.

No.	Pos.	Nation	Player
6	MF	RUS	Vyacheslav Semashkin (from (Russia) Zelenograd)
8	MF	RUS	Maksim Primak (from (Russia) Torpedo Armavir)
9	MF	RUS	Pavel Veretennikov (end of loan from (Russia) Energiya Volzhsky)
10	MF	RUS	Khasan Dzhunidov (on loan from (Russia) Terek Grozny)
11	FW	RUS	Yakov Ehrlich (end of loan from (Russia) Gubkin)
12	MF	RUS	Ivan Gerasimov (from (Russia) Torpedo-ZIL Moscow)
13	DF	RUS	Roman Semyakin (from (Russia) Metallurg-Oskol Stary Oskol)
15	FW	RUS	Sergei Ivanov (end of loan from (Russia) Energiya Volzhsky)
16	GK	RUS	Valeri Polyakov (from (Russia) Torpedo Moscow)
18	FW	RUS	Roman Smolskiy (from (Russia) MITOS Novocherkassk)
19	DF	RUS	Dmitry Kosenko (from (Russia) Metallurg Lipetsk)
21	MF	RUS	Vyacheslav Sostin (from (Russia) MITOS Novocherkassk)
22	MF	RUS	Nikita Glushkov (end of loan from (Russia) Energiya Volzhsky)
26	MF	RUS	Nikolai Fiyev (from (Russia) Zhemchuzhina-Sochi)
27	DF	RUS	Mikhail Merkulov (from Youth system)
33	GK	RUS	Aleksandr Bondar (from Youth system)
74	FW	RUS	Denis Zubko (from (Russia) Ural Yekaterinburg)
—	DF	RUS	Maksim Romanov (from Youth system)
—	FW	RUS	Sergei Sadchikov (from Youth system)
—	DF	RUS	Pavel Orlov (end of loan from (Russia) Energiya Volzhsky)
—	DF	RUS	Andrei Khismatullin (end of loan from (Russia) Energiya Volzhsky)

Out: Note: Flags indicate national team as defined under FIFA eligibility rules; some limited exceptions apply. Players may hold more than one non-FIFA nationality.

No.	Pos.	Nation	Player
6	DF	RUS	Aleksandr Kukanos (end of loan to (Russia) KAMAZ)
7	MF	RUS	Vladimir Smirnov (to (Russia) Dynamo Kostroma)
8	DF	RUS	Vasili Chernov (to (Russia) Mashuk-KMV Pyatigorsk)
9	FW	RUS	Mikhail Markosov (to (Russia) Dynamo Stavropol)
10	DF	RUS	Stepan Ryabokon (to (Russia) CSKA Moscow)
11	FW	MWI	Essau Kanyenda (end of loan to (Russia) KAMAZ Naberezhnye Chelny)
12	FW	RUS	Mikhail Mysin (end of loan to (Russia) Volga Nizhny Novgorod)
13	MF	RUS	Igor Shestakov (to (Russia) Khimki)
14	DF	RUS	Aleksei Yepifanov (to (Russia) Avangard Kursk)
15	DF	RUS	Ruslan Beslaneyev (to (Russia) Zenit Penza)
17	MF	RUS	Oleg Aleynik (to (Russia) Ural Yekaterinburg)
19	MF	RUS	Sergei Mikhailov (to (Russia) Metallurg Lipetsk)
21	FW	RUS	Denis Dorozhkin (end of loan to (Russia) Krasnodar)
22	DF	RUS	Pavel Mogilevskiy (to (Russia) Luch-Energiya Vladivostok)
23	MF	RUS	Oleg Trifonov (end of loan to (Russia) Volga Nizhny Novgorod)
24	MF	RUS	Murad Ramazanov (to (Russia) Dagdizel Kaspiysk)
25	MF	RUS	Aleksandr Gaidukov (to (Russia) Energiya Volzhsky)
27	FW	RUS	Aleksandr Savin (to (Russia) Volochanin-Ratmir Vyshny Volochyok)
28	MF	RUS	Kirill Kochubei (to (Russia) SKA-Energiya Khabarovsk)
29	DF	RUS	Aleksei Zhitnikov (to (Russia) Volgar-Gazprom Astrakhan)
30	GK	RUS	Andrei Chichkin (to (Russia) Metallurg Lipetsk)
77	GK	RUS	Andrei Nikitin (retired)
—	DF	RUS	Pavel Orlov (on loan to (Russia) MITOS Novocherkassk)
—	DF	RUS	Andrei Khismatullin

=== Summer ===
In: Note: Flags indicate national team as defined under FIFA eligibility rules; some limited exceptions apply. Players may hold more than one non-FIFA nationality.

No.	Pos.	Nation	Player
10	DF	RUS	Stepan Ryabokon (from (Russia) CSKA Moscow)
19	FW	RUS	Vladislav Khrushchak (from Youth system)
23	MF	RUS	Oleg Trifonov (from (Russia) Sokol Saratov)
38	MF	RUS	Oleg Aleynik (from (Russia) Ural Yekaterinburg)
—	DF	RUS	Pavel Orlov (end of loan from (Russia) MITOS Novocherkassk)

Out: Note: Flags indicate national team as defined under FIFA eligibility rules; some limited exceptions apply. Players may hold more than one non-FIFA nationality.

No.	Pos.	Nation	Player
10	MF	RUS	Khasan Dzhunidov (end of loan to (Russia) Terek Grozny)
11	FW	RUS	Yakov Ehrlich (to (Russia) Mostovik-Primorye Ussuriysk)
19	DF	RUS	Dmitry Kosenko (to (Russia) Metallurg Lipetsk)
—	DF	RUS	Pavel Orlov (on loan to (Russia) Energiya Volzhsky)

=== Winter 2011–12 ===
In: Note: Flags indicate national team as defined under FIFA eligibility rules; some limited exceptions apply. Players may hold more than one non-FIFA nationality.

No.	Pos.	Nation	Player
9	MF	RUS	Aleksandr Nechayev (from (Russia) SKA-Energiya Khabarovsk)
11	FW	RUS	Sergei Shumilin (from (Russia) Dynamo Barnaul)
23	MF	RUS	Denis Arlashin (from (Russia) Dnepr Smolensk)
44	MF	RUS	Sergei Rashevsky (from (Russia) Ural Yekaterinburg)

Out: Note: Flags indicate national team as defined under FIFA eligibility rules; some limited exceptions apply. Players may hold more than one non-FIFA nationality.

No.	Pos.	Nation	Player
6	MF	RUS	Vyacheslav Semashkin (to (Russia) MITOS Novocherkassk)
9	MF	RUS	Pavel Veretennikov (to (Russia) Energiya Volzhsky)
15	FW	RUS	Sergei Ivanov
23	MF	RUS	Oleg Trifonov (to (Russia) Rus Saint Petersburg)
—	DF	RUS	Maksim Romanov (to (Russia) Energiya Volzhsky)
—	FW	RUS	Sergei Sadchikov (to (Russia) Energiya Volzhsky)

== Competitions ==
=== Friendlies ===
13 February 2011 Pre-season	Rotor Volgograd	0–0	Rostov (reserve)	Adler

16 February 2011 Pre-season	Rotor Volgograd	1–0	Metallurg-Kuzbass Novokuznetsk	Adler
	1:0 Glushkov 77'

19 February 2011 Pre-season	Rotor Volgograd	1–2	Mostovik-Primorye Ussuriysk	Adler
	1:1 Vyacheslav Sostin 47'		0:1 Khinchagov 15'; 1:2 Ionov 82' (ag.)

7 March 2011 Pre-season	Rotor Volgograd	3–1	Metallurg-Oskol Stary Oskol	Adler
	1:0 Kosenko 42'; 2:0 Roman Smolskiy 51'; 3:0 Ionov 53'		3:1 Mishustin 88'

10 March 2011 Pre-season	Rotor Volgograd	2–0	Sakhalin Yuzhno-Sakhalinsk	Adler
	1:0 Roman Smolskiy 44'; 2:0 Ehrlich 50'

13 March 2011 Pre-season	Rotor Volgograd	1–1	Kaluga	Adler
	1:1 Ehrlich 76' (pen.)		0:1 Dmitri Baranov 4'

27 March 2011 Pre-season	Rotor Volgograd	1–0	Spartak-Nalchik	Sochi
	1:0 Sergei Ivanov 89'

30 March 2011 Pre-season	Rotor Volgograd	4–0	Nosta Novotroitsk	Sochi
	1:0 Primak 54'; 2:0 Roman Smolskiy 60'; 3:0 Zubko 67' (pen.); 4:0 Vyacheslav Sostin 90'

11 April 2011 Pre-season	Rotor Volgograd	2–0	Energiya Volzhsky	Volgograd
	1:0 Roman Smolskiy 3'; 2:0 Ehrlich 30' (pen.)			Stadium: Tsentralniy; Attendance: 100; Referee: Eduard Panasyuk (Volzhsky)

31 July 2011	Rotor Volgograd	4–1	Energiya Volzhsky	Volgograd
	1:0 Borisov 23'; 2:0 Borisov 40' (pen.); 3:1 Zubko 61'; 4:1 Zubko 80' (pen.)		2:1 Yevgeni Pronin 57'	Stadium: Traktor; Attendance: 100

5 October 2011	Paritet Uryupinsk	1–2	Rotor Volgograd	Uryupinsk
	1:1 Ryabtsev		0:1 Roman Smolskiy 31'; 1:2 Ryabokon 79'	Stadium: Tsentralniy; Attendance: 500

2 November 2011 Mid-season	Tekstilshchik Kamyshin	1–3	Rotor Volgograd	Kamyshin
	1:0 Kirenkin 27'		1:1 P.Veretennikov 59'; 1:2 O.Veretennikov 82' (pen.); 1:3 Aleynik 88'	Stadium: Tekstilshchik; Attendance: 500; Referee: S.Lyalin (Kamyshin)

2 February 2012 Mid-season	Yug-Sport Sochi	2–2	Rotor Volgograd	Sochi
	1:1 ? 2:2 ? 85'		0:1 Ryabokon 25'; Aleynik (penalty missed) 66'; 1:2 Vyacheslav Semashkin 78'

5 February 2012 Mid-season	Rotor Volgograd	1–1	Gornyak Uchaly	Sochi
	1:0 Gagloyev 32' (pen.)		1:1 Fuad Geydarov 62' (pen.)

5 February 2012 Mid-season	Rotor Volgograd	1–2	Baltika Kaliningrad	Sochi
	1:2 Merkulov 89'		0:1 Rodenkov 45'; 0:1 Kryshtafovich 78'	Stadium: Tsentralniy (reserved field)

11 February 2012 Mid-season	Rotor Volgograd	1–3	Avangard Kursk	Adler
	1:1 Shudrov 67'		0:1 Yesikov 58'; 1:2 Mitasov 81'; 1:3 Pavel Kadushkin 84'

23 February 2012 Mid-season	Rotor Volgograd	1–2	Chita	(Turkey) Belek
	1:1 Borisov 52'; Borisov (penalty missed) 85'		0:1 Garannikov 37'; 1:2 Fatikhov 90+'

26 February 2012 Mid-season	Rotor Volgograd (Russia)	4–3	(Belarus) Brest	(Turkey) Belek
	1:1 Semyakin 43'; 2:1 Glushkov 59'; 3:1 Zubko 64'; 4:1 Shumilin 68'		0:1 Gogoladze 12'; 4:2 Khvashchynski 75'; 4:3 Khvashchynski 79'

29 February 2012 Mid-season	Rotor Volgograd	0–1	Gazovik Orenburg	(Turkey) Belek
			0:1 Kozhanov 39'; Kuleshov (penalty missed) 68'

3 March 2012 Mid-season	Rotor Volgograd	1–0	Neftekhimik Nizhnekamsk	(Turkey) Belek
	1:0 Semyakin 18'			Referee: (Belarus) Mikhail Lavski

13 March 2012 Mid-season	Volgar-Gazprom Astrakhan	1–2	Rotor Volgograd	(Turkey) Antalya
	1:2 Perov 80'		0:1 Guz 7'; 1:1 Guz 43'

18 March 2012 Mid-season	Rotor Volgograd	0–1	Baltika Kaliningrad	(Turkey) Belek
			0:1 Rodenkov 85'

22 March 2012 Mid-season	Rotor Volgograd (Russia)	2–1	(Denmark) Randers	(Turkey) Belek
	1:0 Borisov 8'; 2:0 Shumilin 22'		2:1 Egholm 89'

24 March 2012 Mid-season	Rotor Volgograd	1–2	Tyumen	(Turkey) Belek
	Roman Smolskiy 30'		Andreev; Volosyan

12 April 2012 Mid-season	Rotor Volgograd	3–1	Energiya Volzhsky	Volgograd
	1:0 Shumilin 40'; 2:0 Nechayev 62'; 3:1 Guz 76'		2:1 Dmitri Gubochkin 66'	Stadium: Zenit (reserved field); Attendance: 300; Referee: Sergei Baranov (Volzhsky)

=== Russian Second Division ===
17 April 2011 1	Rotor Volgograd	3–0	Dagdizel Kaspiysk	Volgograd
17:00 MSK (UTC+4)	1:0 Ehrlich 32'; 2:0 Gerasimov 48'; 3:0 Primak 78'	Summary		Stadium: Tsentralniy; Attendance: 3,000; Referee: Vladimir Kazmenko (Rostov-on-Don)

26 April 2011 2	FAYUR Beslan	1–1	Rotor Volgograd	Vladikavkaz
17:00 MSK (UTC+4)	1:0 Semyakin 2' (ag.)	Summary	1:1 Ionov 69'	Stadium: Spartak (reserved field); Attendance: 700; Referee: Vitali Anisimov (Krasnodar)

3 May 2011 3	Rotor Volgograd	1–0	Taganrog	Volgograd
19:00 MSK (UTC+4)	1:0 Roman Smolskiy 77'	Summary		Stadium: Tsentralniy; Attendance: 3,500; Referee: Aleksei Kovalev (Tambov)

12 May 2011 4	Kavkaztransgaz-2005 Ryzdvyany	0–1	Rotor Volgograd	Ryzdvyany
18:00 MSK (UTC+4)		Summary	0:1 Vyacheslav Sostin 28'	Stadium: Fakel; Attendance: 1,000; Referee: Vasili Miroshnichenko (Rostov-on-Don)

19 May 2011 5	Rotor Volgograd	1–1	Slavyansky Slavyansk-na-Kubani	Volgograd
19:00 MSK (UTC+4)	1:1 Vyacheslav Sostin 52'	Summary	0:1 Grantovskiy 26'	Stadium: Tsentralniy; Attendance: 3,000; Referee: Vladimir Moskalyov (Voronezh)

28 May 2011 6	Astrakhan	1–1	Rotor Volgograd	Astrakhan
18:00 MSK (UTC+4)	1:0 Sergei Sechin 50'	Summary	1:1 Zubko 65' (pen.)	Stadium: Astrakhan; Attendance: 2,200; Referee: Aleksandr Gonchar (Sochi)

5 June 2011 7	Rotor Volgograd	3–1	MITOS Novocherkassk	Volgograd
19:00 MSK (UTC+4)	1:0 Zubko 30' (pen.); 2:0 Borisov 32'; 3:0 Vyacheslav Semashkin 54'	Summary	3:1 Boyev 82'	Stadium: Tsentralniy; Attendance: 4,000; Referee: Aleksandr Gurenko (Astrakhan)

12 June 2011 8	Torpedo Armavir	2–0	Rotor Volgograd	Armavir
18:30 MSK (UTC+4)	1:0 Pavlov 47'; 2:0 Pavlov 69' (pen.)	Summary		Stadium: Yunost; Attendance: 3,500; Referee: Sergei Pogarchenko (Shakhty)

21 June 2011 9	Rotor Volgograd	5–0	Mashuk-KMV Pyatigorsk	Volgograd
19:00 MSK (UTC+4)	1:0 Roman Smolskiy 29'; 2:0 Mullyar 43' (ag.); 3:0 Gerasimov 70'; 4:0 Ionov 83'; 5:0 Gerasimov 90'	Summary		Stadium: Tsentralniy; Attendance: 3,000; Referee: Konstantin Nikisha (Kropotkin)

28 June 2011 10	Alania-D Vladikavkaz	0–3	Rotor Volgograd	Vladikavkaz
14:00 MSK (UTC+4)		Summary	0:1 Roman Smolskiy 11'; 0:2 Gerasimov 37' (pen.); 0:3 Ehrlich 74'	Stadium: Spartak (reserved field); Attendance: 400; Referee: Aleksandr Gurenko (Astrakhan)

6 July 2011 11	Rotor Volgograd	3–0	SKA Rostov-on-Don	Volgograd
19:00 MSK (UTC+4)	1:0 Vyacheslav Sostin 2'; 2:0 Borisov 47'; 3:0 Vyacheslav Semashkin 83'	Summary		Stadium: Tsentralniy; Attendance: 4,500; Referee: Yuri Sotnikov (Novorossiysk)

13 July 2011 12	Dynamo Stavropol	0–1	Rotor Volgograd	Stavropol
19:00 MSK (UTC+4)		Summary	0:1 Vyacheslav Sostin 52'	Stadium: Dynamo; Attendance: 4,500; Referee: Vitali Anisimov (Krasnodar)

20 July 2011 13	Rotor Volgograd	3–0	Olimpia Gelendzhik	Volgograd
19:00 MSK (UTC+4)	1:0 Borisov 2'; 2:0 Gerasimov 68'; 3:0 Glushkov 89'	Summary		Stadium: Tsentralniy; Attendance: 5,500; Referee: Artyom Chistyakov (Azov)

7 August 2011 14	Angusht Nazran	1–0	Rotor Volgograd	Nazran
18:00 MSK (UTC+4)	1:0 Akhilgov 68' (pen.)	Summary		Stadium: Tsentralniy; Attendance: 2,000; Referee: Sergei Ivanov (Rostov-on-Don)

14 August 2011 15	Rotor Volgograd	2–0	Druzhba Maykop	Volgograd
19:00 MSK (UTC+4)	1:0 Ionov 7'; 2:0 Roman Smolskiy 65'	Summary		Stadium: Tsentralniy; Attendance: 6,000; Referee: Sergei Pogarchenko (Shakhty)

21 August 2011 16	Biolog-Novokubansk Progress	0–1	Rotor Volgograd	Progress
18:00 MSK (UTC+4)	Kokorev (penalty missed) 25'	Summary	0:1 Borisov 61'	Stadium: Biolog; Attendance: 1,000; Referee: Artyom Chistyakov (Azov)

28 August 2011 17	Rotor Volgograd	3–0	Energiya Volzhsky	Volgograd
17:00 MSK (UTC+4)	1:0 Zubko 45' (pen.); 2:0 Vyacheslav Sostin 79'; 3:0 Gerasimov 90+'	Summary		Stadium: Tsentralniy; Attendance: 5,500; Referee: Konstantin Nikisha (Kropotkin)

4 September 2011 18	Rotor Volgograd	1–1	FAYUR Beslan	Volgograd
18:00 MSK (UTC+4)	Zubko (penalty missed) 37'; 1:1 Aleynik 90'	Summary	0:1 Dudiyev 9'	Stadium: Tsentralniy; Attendance: 6,000; Referee: Yuri Sotnikov (Novorossiysk)

11 September 2011 19	Taganrog	2–0	Rotor Volgograd	Taganrog
16:00 MSK (UTC+4)	Vladimir Shamara 40'; Artyom Maslevskiy 52' (pen.)	Summary		Stadium: Torpedo; Attendance: 800; Referee: Sergei Smirnov (Kislovodsk)

18 September 2011 20	Rotor Volgograd	3–1	Kavkaztransgaz-2005 Ryzdvyany	Volgograd
18:00 MSK (UTC+4)	1:0 Zubko 37' (pen.); 2:0 Olenikov 47'; 3:0 Trifonov 79' (pen.)	Summary	3:1 Konov 82' (pen.)	Stadium: Tsentralniy; Attendance: 5,000; Referee: Sergei Ivanov (Rostov-on-Don)

26 September 2011 21	Slavyansky Slavyansk-na-Kubani	0–1	Rotor Volgograd	Slavyansk-na-Kubani
17:00 MSK (UTC+4)		Summary	0:1 Olenikov 11'	Stadium: Viktoriya; Attendance: 1,100; Referee: Sergei Pogarchenko (Shakhty)

2 October 2011 22	Rotor Volgograd	6–1	Astrakhan	Volgograd
17:00 MSK (UTC+4)	1:0 Borisov 3'; 2:0 Guz 7'; 3:1 Gerasimov 18'; 4:1 Roman Smolskiy 34'; 5:1 Zubko 90' (pen.); 6:1 Zubko 90+'	Summary	2:1 Kaleutin 9'	Stadium: Tsentralniy; Attendance: 4,000; Referee: Lasha Verulidze (Vladikavkaz)

9 October 2011 23	MITOS Novocherkassk	1–3	Rotor Volgograd	Novocherkassk
15:00 MSK (UTC+4)	1:1 Dmitry Mezinov 46'	Summary	0:1 Borisov 28'; 1:2 Borisov 37'; 1:3 Aleynik 85'	Stadium: Yermak; Attendance: 2,100; Referee: Denis Shpilev (Belgorod)

16 October 2011 24	Rotor Volgograd	0–0	Torpedo Armavir	Volgograd
17:00 MSK (UTC+4)		Summary		Stadium: Tsentralniy; Attendance: 11,000; Referee: Sergei Ivanov (Rostov-on-Don)

23 October 2011 25	Mashuk-KMV Pyatigorsk	0–1	Rotor Volgograd	Pyatigorsk
16:00 MSK (UTC+4)		Summary	0:1 Guz 55'	Stadium: Tsentralniy; Attendance: 2,200; Referee: Artyom Chistyakov (Azov)

30 October 2011 26	Rotor Volgograd	3–0	Alania-D Vladikavkaz	Volgograd
17:00 MSK (UTC+4)	1:0 Guz 8'; 2:0 Borisov 29'; 3:0 Roman Smolskiy 35'	Summary		Stadium: Tsentralniy; Attendance: 6,500; Referee: Sergei Pogarchenko (Shakhty)

18 April 2012 27	SKA Rostov-on-Don	0–3	Rotor Volgograd	Bataysk
16:00 MSK (UTC+4)		Summary	0:1 Roman Smolskiy 18'; 0:2 Ionov 34'; 0:3 Nechayev 58'	Stadium: Lokomotiv; Attendance: 1,300; Referee: Maksim Vasilchenko (Maykop)

25 April 2012 28	Rotor Volgograd	1–0	Dynamo Stavropol	Volgograd
19:00 MSK (UTC+4)	1:0 Arlashin 70'	Summary		Stadium: Tsentralniy; Attendance: 12,000; Referee: Vitali Anisimov (Krasnodar)

1 May 2012 29	Olimpia Gelendzhik	1–3	Rotor Volgograd	Kabardinka
15:00 MSK (UTC+4)	1:0 Basiyev 6'	Summary	1:1 Vyacheslav Sostin 36'; 1:2 Nechayev 56'; 1:3 Roman Smolskiy 63'	Stadium: Olimp; Attendance: 450; Referee: Sergei Pogarchenko (Shakhty)

7 May 2012 30	Rotor Volgograd	4–0	Angusht Nazran	Volgograd
19:00 MSK (UTC+4)	1:0 Nechayev 40'; 2:0 Guz 56'; 3:0 Shumilin 84'; 4:0 Zubko 90+'	Summary		Stadium: Tsentralniy; Attendance: 8,500; Referee: Aleksandr Gurenko (Astrakhan)

13 May 2012 31	Druzhba Maykop	0–0	Rotor Volgograd	Maykop
18:00 MSK (UTC+4)		Summary		Stadium: Yunost; Attendance: 500; Referee: Sergei Smirnov (Kislovodsk)

19 May 2012 32	Rotor Volgograd	3–0	Biolog-Novokubansk Progress	Volgograd
19:30 MSK (UTC+4)	1:0 Ionov 56'; 2:0 Primak 87'; 3:0 Borisov 90+'	Summary		Stadium: Tsentralniy; Attendance: 12,000; Referee: Artyom Chistyakov (Azov)

25 May 2012 33	Energiya Volzhsky	2–3	Rotor Volgograd	Volzhsky
18:00 MSK (UTC+4)	1:3 Artyom Stezhka 69'; 2:3 Yatsuk 90'	Summary	0:1 Olenikov 25'; 0:2 Arlashin 41'; 0:3 Roman Smolskiy 61'	Stadium: Tsentralniy; Attendance: 4,000; Referee: Sergei Soshenko (Voronezh)

31 May 2012 34	Dagdizel Kaspiysk	0–0	Rotor Volgograd	Derbent
16:00 MSK (UTC+4)		Summary		Stadium: Yunost; Attendance: 500; Referee: Vitali Anisimov (Krasnodar)

==== Table ====
Pos	Team	Pld	W	D	L	GF	GA	GD	Pts
1	Rotor Volgograd	34	24	7	3	67	16	+51	79
2	Torpedo Armavir	34	22	6	6	53	21	+32	72
3	Slavyansky Slavyansk-na-Kubani	34	18	10	6	47	24	+23	64
4	Mashuk-KMV Pyatigorsk	34	18	5	11	43	33	+10	59
5	Dagdizel Kaspiysk	34	17	8	9	45	28	+17	59
6	Astrakhan	34	17	5	12	64	49	+15	56
7	Angusht Nazran	34	15	5	14	48	46	+2	50
8	Dynamo Stavropol	34	15	4	15	51	41	+10	49
9	MITOS Novocherkassk	34	13	9	12	48	42	+6	48
10	Kavkaztransgaz-2005 Ryzdvyany	34	12	9	13	39	39	0	45
11	FAYUR Beslan	34	11	8	15	41	59	−18	41
12	Druzhba Maykop	34	10	11	13	42	44	−2	41
13	Taganrog	34	10	7	17	40	51	−11	37
14	Olimpia Gelendzhik	34	10	4	20	37	56	−19	34
15	Biolog-Novokubansk Progress	34	7	12	15	32	40	−8	33
16	Energiya Volzhsky	34	9	5	20	35	68	−33	32
17	Alania-D Vladikavkaz	34	9	3	22	29	71	−42	30
18	SKA Rostov-on-Don	34	8	4	22	26	59	−33	28

Promoted
Relegated

=== Russian Cup ===
8 May 2011 Second round	Rotor Volgograd	1–0	Energiya Volzhsky	Volgograd
17:00 MSK (UTC+4)	1:0 Veretennikov 90+' (pen.)	Summary		Stadium: Tsentralniy; Attendance: 1,500; Referee: Konstantin Nikisha (Kropotkin)

23 May 2011 Third round	SKA Rostov-on-Don	0–1	Rotor Volgograd	Rostov-on-Don
18:00 MSK (UTC+4)		Summary	0:1 Zubko 90'	Stadium: SKA SKVO; Attendance: 2,500; Referee: Maksim Vasilchenko (Maykop)

16 June 2011 Fourth round	Torpedo Armavir	2–1	Rotor Volgograd	Armavir
18:00 MSK (UTC+4)	1:0 Zangareev 48'; 2:1 Zangareev 90+' (pen.)	Summary	1:1 Guz 89'	Stadium: Yunost; Attendance: 3,000; Referee: Artyom Chistyakov (Azov)

== Statistics ==
=== Squad statistics ===
==== League ====
===== Minutes played =====
Pos.	Player	Minutes Played per Round																																		App.	GS	↑	↓	Min.
Pos.	Player	1	2	3	4	5	6	7	8	9	10	11	12	13	14	15	16	17	18	19	20	21	22	23	24	25	26	27	28	29	30	31	32	33	34	App.	GS	↑	↓	Min.
Вр	(Russia) Aleksandr Malyshev	90	90	90	90	90	90	90	90	90	90	90	90	90	90	90	90	90	90	90	90	90	90	90	90	90	90	90	90	90	90	•	90	•	90	32	32	0	0	2880
Вр	(Russia) Valeri Polyakov	•	•	•	•	•	•	•	•	•	•	•	•	•	•	•	•	•	•	•	•	•	•	•	•	•	•	•	•	•	•	90	•	90	•	2	2	0	0	180
Вр	(Russia) Aleksandr Bondar																																			0	0	0	0	0
Защ	(Russia) Nikolai Olenikov	90	90	90	90	90	90	90	90	90	90	90	90	90	90	90	90	90	90	90	90	90	90	90	90	90	90	90	90	90	•	90	90	90	90	33	33	0	0	2970
Защ	(Russia) Dmitri Guz	90	90	90	90	90	12↓		90		90	90	90	90	75↓	90	90	90	90	90		90	90	90	90	90	90	90	90	90	90	90	90	90	90	31	31	0	2	2697
Защ	(Russia) Roman Semyakin	90	90			90	90	90	90	90	90	90	90	90	90	90	90	90	90	90		33↑	90		90	90	90	90	90	90	90		90	90	90	29	28	1	0	2553
Защ	(Russia) Ilya Ionov	90	90	85↓	•	•	90	90	90	90	90	90	90	90		90												90	90	90	90	90	90	90	90	20	20	0	1	1795
Защ	(Russia) Stepan Ryabokon														3↑	42↑	•	•	•	•	90	64↓	37↑	90	16↑	82↓	59↓	18↑	•	17↑	90					12	6	6	3	608
Защ	(Russia) Dmitri Kosenko	18↑	27↑	90	90	90					10↑	1↑	25↑	•	90																					9	4	5	0	441
Защ	(Russia) Mikhail Merkulov			•				13↑								•					•											72↓		31↑	90	4	2	2	1	206
Защ	(Russia) Maksim Romanov							2↑													•															1	0	1	0	2
ПЗ	(Russia) Vyacheslav Sostin	72↓	63↓	76↓	90↓	74↓	90		90	90	80↓	89↓	90	80↓	90	90↓	90	90	90	90	90	90	90	90↓	90	90	46↓	90	90	73↓	90	18↑	80↓			31	30	1	13	2551
ПЗ	(Russia) Ivan Gerasimov	66↓	65↓	68↓	82↓	58↓	64↓	64↓	70↓	27↑	55↓	72↓	73↓	72↓	76↓	48↓	88↓	40↑	62↓	90	90	90↓	69↓	82↓	90	90↓	72↓	3↑↓								27	24	3	22	1826
ПЗ	(Russia) Nikita Glushkov	44↑	•	90	90	46↓	78↑	90	•	90	44↑	26↑	38↑	25↑	87↓		•	28↑	16↑	46↓	90	90	43↓		90	90	90	32↑	10↑	30↑	63↓	63↓	90	21↑	49↓	29	17	12	7	1689
ПЗ	(Russia) Sergei Shudrov				8↑	16↑	90	46↓	76↓	90	85↓	90	52↓	77↓		14↑	90	90	74↓	78↓		53↓	17↑	90	•	8↑	18↑	•	1↑	10↑	14↑	90	•	69↓	41↑	26	16	10	9	1387
ПЗ	(Russia) Nikolai Fiyev		48↑	14↑	16↓			44↑	14↑	76↓	46↓	64↓	58↓	65↓	61↓		2↑	20↑	27↑	44↑	90	90	61↓	65↓	90	54↓	31↑	14↑	34↑	26↓			14↑	29↑	90	28	15	13	11	1287
ПЗ	(Russia) Maksim Primak	89↓	90	90	90	90	90	90					•	13↑	15↑	90	90	82↓	63↓							23↑	44↑					27↑	10↑	90	56↓	19	13	6	4	1232
ПЗ	(Russia) Oleg Trifonov																37↑	70↓	55↓	60↓	90	69↓	90	90	74↓	77↓	62↓									11	10	1	7	774
ПЗ	(Russia) Oleg Aleynik														29↑	33↑	58↓	50↓	44↑	57↓	34↑	26↑	29↑	25↑	20↑	•	28↑		14↑	•	27↑	90	20↑	61↓	90	18	6	12	4	735
ПЗ	(Russia) Vyacheslav Semashkin	24↑	25↑	22↑	74↑	32↑	26↑	77↓	20↑	63↓	35↑	16↑	32↑	10↑	14↑	33↑	1↑	8↑	28↑	30↑	20↑	1↑	21↑	25↑	•	1↑	•									24	2	22	2	638
ПЗ	(Russia) Aleksandr Nechayev																											72↓	76↓	76↓	77↓	22↑	76↓	59↓		7	6	1	6	458
ПЗ	(Russia) Denis Arlashin																											78↓	90↓	90	48↓	•	88↓	53↓		6	6	0	5	447
ПЗ	(Russia) Sergei Rashevsky																											76↓	80↓	80↓	75↓					4	4	0	4	311
ПЗ	(Russia) Pavel Veretennikov	1↑	•	1↑	1↑		•	26↑	•	1↑	5↑	•			•	1↑				•	•	•	•	8↑	•											8	0	8	0	44
ПЗ	(Russia) Khasan Dzhunidov	•		1↑		•	•	17↑	•																											2	0	2	0	18
Нап	(Russia) Roman Smolskiy	90	90	90↓	90	87*			90	89↓	62↓	65↓	90↓	90	48↓	76↓	90↓	34↑	90	90	90	67↓	53↓		70↓	36↑	90	58↓	56↓	64↑	56↓	90	35↑	75↓	83↓	31	27	4	16	2284
Нап	(Russia) Denis Zubko	46↓	42↓		23↑	68↓	85↓	88↓	90	53↓		25↑	17↑	34↑	42↑	57↓	53↓	56↓	46↓	33↑	56↓	23↑	30↑	90	49↓	67↓	28↑	9↑	7↑		13↑	34↑	55↓	15↑	7↑	31	16	15	14	1341
Нап	(Russia) Viktor Borisov					22↑	50↑	73↓	65↓	37↑	90	74↓	65↓	56↓	90	57↓	32↑	62↓	35↑		70↓	21↑	60↓	65↓	41↑	13↑	62↓			14↑	42↑	68↓	2↑	37↑		26	14	12	12	1303
Нап	(Russia) Yakov Ehrlich	84↓	90	90↓	67↓	44↑	40↓	•	25↑	14↑	28↑	18↑	1↑	18↑																						12	5	7	4	519
Нап	(Russia) Sergei Shumilin																											90	83↓	60↓	34↑	•	70↓			5	4	1	3	337
Нап	(Russia) Vladislav Khrushchak																															56↓			34↑	2	1	1	1	90
Нап	(Russia) Sergei Ivanov	6↑	•	5↑	•		5↑													12↑	•			1↑												5	0	5	0	29
Нап	(Russia) Sergei Sadchikov																																			0	0	0	0	0

Player Started Player Subbed In Player Suspended Player Injured / Sick Player Left Club / Not Signed / Loan Expired • Player in Application * Player Dismissed from Field

===== Goal scorers =====
Rank	Player	Goals per Round																																		Total
Rank	Player	1	2	3	4	5	6	7	8	9	10	11	12	13	14	15	16	17	18	19	20	21	22	23	24	25	26	27	28	29	30	31	32	33	34	Total
1	(Russia) Viktor Borisov							1				1		1			1						1	2			1						1			9
1	(Russia) Roman Smolskiy			1						1	1					1							1				1	1		1				1		9
2	(Russia) Ivan Gerasimov	1								2	1			1				1					1													7 (1)
2	(Russia) Denis Zubko						1	1										1			1		2								1					7 (5)
3	(Russia) Vyacheslav Sostin				1	1						1	1					1												1						6
4	(Russia) Ilya Ionov		1							1						1												1					1			5
5	(Russia) Dmitri Guz																						1			1	1				1					4
6	(Russia) Aleksandr Nechayev																											1		1	1					3
6	(Russia) Nikolai Olenikov																				1	1												1		3
7	(Russia) Denis Arlashin																												1					1		2
7	(Russia) Yakov Ehrlich	1									1																									2
7	(Russia) Vyacheslav Semashkin							1				1																								2
7	(Russia) Oleg Aleynik																		1					1												2
7	(Russia) Maksim Primak	1																															1			2
8	(Russia) Sergei Shumilin																														1					1
8	(Russia) Nikita Glushkov													1																						1
8	(Russia) Oleg Trifonov																				1															1 (1)

One goal scored from penalty kick

===== Discipline =====
Rank	Player	Cards per Round																																		Booked	(yellow card) (red card)	Sent off (straight red)
Rank	Player	1	2	3	4	5	6	7	8	9	10	11	12	13	14	15	16	17	18	19	20	21	22	23	24	25	26	27	28	29	30	31	32	33	34	Booked	(yellow card) (red card)	Sent off (straight red)
1	(Russia) Nikita Glushkov				Booked							Booked	Booked		Booked			Booked		Booked	Booked		Booked		Booked										Booked	10	0	0
1	(Russia) Dmitri Guz		Booked	Booked	Booked				Booked			Booked	Booked				Booked			Booked									Booked			Booked				10	0	0
2	(Russia) Roman Smolskiy			Booked	Booked	Sent off (straight red)			Booked														Booked					Booked		Booked						6	0	1
3	(Russia) Viktor Borisov									Booked	Booked			Booked					Booked												Booked		Booked			6	0	0
3	(Russia) Ilya Ionov		Booked				Booked		Booked					Booked																			Booked		Booked	6	0	0
3	(Russia) Roman Semyakin						Booked								Booked					Booked			Booked		Booked		Booked									6	0	0
4	(Russia) Sergei Shudrov								Booked				Booked			Booked				Booked															Booked	5	0	0
5	(Russia) Stepan Ryabokon																				Booked	Booked		Booked												3	0	0
6	(Russia) Sergei Shumilin																											Booked			Booked					2	0	0
6	(Russia) Maksim Primak	Booked			Booked																															2	0	0
6	(Russia) Aleksandr Malyshev		Booked			Booked																														2	0	0
6	(Russia) Nikolai Olenikov			Booked																					Booked											2	0	0
7	(Russia) Dmitri Kosenko				Booked																															1	0	0
7	(Russia) Oleg Aleynik																														Booked					1	0	0
7	(Russia) Oleg Trifonov																									Booked										1	0	0
7	(Russia) Ivan Gerasimov																									Booked										1	0	0

Player Suspended

==== All Tournaments ====
===== Appearances and goals =====
No.	Pos	Nat	Player	Total		Second Division		Russian Cup	
No.	Pos	Nat	Player	Apps	Goals	Apps	Goals	Apps	Goals
1	GK	(Russia) RUS	Aleksandr Malyshev	34	-16	32	-14	2	-2
16	GK	(Russia) RUS	Valeri Polyakov	3	-2	2	-2	1	0
33	GK	(Russia) RUS	Aleksandr Bondar	0	0	0	0	0	0
3	DF	(Russia) RUS	Nikolai Olenikov	35	3	33	3	2	0
5	DF	(Russia) RUS	Dmitri Guz	34	5	31	4	3	1
13	DF	(Russia) RUS	Roman Semyakin	31	0	29	0	2	0
2	DF	(Russia) RUS	Ilya Ionov	22	5	20	5	2	0
10	DF	(Russia) RUS	Stepan Ryabokon	12	0	12	0	0	0
27	DF	(Russia) RUS	Mikhail Merkulov	4	0	4	0	0	0
21	MF	(Russia) RUS	Vyacheslav Sostin	33	6	31	6	2	0
22	MF	(Russia) RUS	Nikita Glushkov	32	1	29	1	3	0
12	MF	(Russia) RUS	Ivan Gerasimov	30	7	27	7	3	0
26	MF	(Russia) RUS	Nikolai Fiyev	30	0	28	0	2	0
4	MF	(Russia) RUS	Sergei Shudrov	28	0	26	0	2	0
8	MF	(Russia) RUS	Maksim Primak	21	2	19	2	2	0
38	MF	(Russia) RUS	Oleg Aleynik	18	2	18	2	0	0
9	MF	(Russia) RUS	Aleksandr Nechayev	7	3	7	3	0	0
23	MF	(Russia) RUS	Denis Arlashin	6	2	6	2	0	0
44	MF	(Russia) RUS	Sergei Rashevsky	4	0	4	0	0	0
18	FW	(Russia) RUS	Roman Smolskiy	34	9	31	9	3	0
74	FW	(Russia) RUS	Denis Zubko	33	8	31	7	2	1
7	FW	(Russia) RUS	Viktor Borisov	28	9	26	9	2	0
11	FW	(Russia) RUS	Sergei Shumilin	5	1	5	1	0	0
19	FW	(Russia) RUS	Vladislav Khrushchak	2	0	2	0	0	0
Players who completed the season with other clubs:
19	DF	(Russia) RUS	Dmitri Kosenko	10	0	9	0	1	0
	DF	(Russia) RUS	Maksim Romanov	1	0	1	0	0	0
6	MF	(Russia) RUS	Vyacheslav Semashkin	27	2	24	2	3	0
23	MF	(Russia) RUS	Oleg Trifonov	11	1	11	1	0	0
9	MF	(Russia) RUS	Pavel Veretennikov	10	1	8	0	2	1
10	MF	(Russia) RUS	Khasan Dzhunidov	3	0	2	0	1	0
11	FW	(Russia) RUS	Yakov Ehrlich	15	2	12	2	3	0
15	FW	(Russia) RUS	Sergei Ivanov	6	0	5	0	1	0
	FW	(Russia) RUS	Sergei Sadchikov	0	0	0	0	0	0

===== Top scorers =====
Player	Second Division	Russian Cup	Total
Viktor Borisov	9	0	9
Roman Smolskiy	9	0	9
Denis Zubko	7	1	8
Ivan Gerasimov	7	0	7
Vyacheslav Sostin	6	0	6
Ilya Ionov	5	0	5
Dmitri Guz	4	1	5
Aleksandr Nechayev	3	0	3
Nikolai Olenikov	3	0	3
Denis Arlashin	2	0	2
Yakov Ehrlich	2	0	2
Vyacheslav Semashkin	2	0	2
Oleg Aleynik	2	0	2
Maksim Primak	2	0	2
Sergei Shumilin	1	0	1
Nikita Glushkov	1	0	1
Oleg Trifonov	1	0	1
Pavel Veretennikov	0	1	1
Total	66	3	69

===== Disciplinary record =====
Имя	Second Division			Russian Cup			Total		
Имя	Booked	(yellow card) (red card)	Sent off (straight red)	Booked	(yellow card) (red card)	Sent off (straight red)	Booked	(yellow card) (red card)	Sent off (straight red)
Nikita Glushkov	10	0	0	1	0	1	11	0	1
Dmitri Guz	10	0	0	1	0	0	11	0	0
Roman Semyakin	6	0	0	2	0	0	8	0	0
Viktor Borisov	6	0	0	1	0	0	7	0	0
Roman Smolskiy	6	0	1	0	0	0	6	0	1
Ilya Ionov	6	0	0	0	0	0	6	0	0
Sergei Shudrov	5	0	0	0	0	0	5	0	0
Nikolai Olenikov	2	0	0	2	0	0	4	0	0
Stepan Ryabokon	3	0	0	0	0	0	3	0	0
Aleksandr Malyshev	2	0	0	1	0	0	3	0	0
Sergei Shumilin	2	0	0	0	0	0	2	0	0
Maksim Primak	2	0	0	0	0	0	2	0	0
Vyacheslav Sostin	0	0	0	2	0	0	2	0	0
Dmitri Kosenko	1	0	0	0	0	0	1	0	0
Oleg Aleynik	1	0	0	0	0	0	1	0	0
Oleg Trifonov	1	0	0	0	0	0	1	0	0
Ivan Gerasimov	1	0	0	0	0	0	1	0	0
Denis Zubko	0	0	0	1	0	0	1	0	0
Total	64	0	1	11	0	1	75	0	2

=== Team statistics ===
==== General statistics ====
Tournament	Pld	W	D	L	GF	GA	GD	YC	2YC	RC	Pts
Second Division	34	24	7	3	67	16	+51	64	0	1	79/102 (77,5 %)
Russian Cup	3	2	0	1	3	2	+1	11	0	1	6/9 (66,7 %)
Total	37	26	7	4	70	18	+52	75	0	2	85/111 (76,6 %)
