= 2011–12 Russian Cup =

Tournament details
- Country: Russia

Final positions
- Champions: Rubin Kazan (1st title)
- Runners-up: Dynamo Moscow

Tournament statistics
- Top goal scorer: Artur Yelbayev (6 goals)

The 2011–12 Russian Cup, known as the 2011–12 Pirelli–Russian Football Cup for sponsorship reasons, was the twentieth season of the Russian football knockout tournament since the dissolution of Soviet Union. The competition started on 20 April 2011 and finished with the final held on 9 May 2012. The cup winner was won a spot in the 2012–13 UEFA Europa League group stage.

== First round ==
This round featured 6 Second Division teams. The game was played on 22 April and 30 April 2011.

=== Section South ===
Team 1	Score	Team 2
Olimpia Gelendzhik (III)	2–2 (a.e.t.) (2–1 p)	Slavyansky Slavyansk-na-Kubani (III)
Biolog-Novokubansk Progress (III)	5–1	FC Taganrog (III)

=== Section East ===
Team 1	Score	Team 2
Amur-2010 Blagoveshchensk (III)	4–2 (a.e.t.)	Yakutiya Yakutsk (III)

== Second round ==
In this round entered 3 winners from the first round, 48 Second Division teams and 3 amateur teams. The matches were played between 22 April and 11 May 2011.

=== Section West ===
Team 1	Score	Team 2
Spartak Kostroma (III)	2–1	Dynamo Kostroma (III)
Tekstilshchik Ivanovo (III)	4–1	Kooperator Vichuga (IV)
Znamya Truda Orekhovo-Zuyevo (III)	0–1	Saturn-2 Moscow Oblast (III)
Dnepr Smolensk (III)	2–0	Stolitsa Moscow (IV)
Sever Murmansk (III)	3–0	Karelia Petrozavodsk (III)
Volochanin-Ratmir Vyshny Volochyok (III)	0–2	Volga Tver (III)

=== Section Center ===
Team 1	Score	Team 2
Lokomotiv Liski (III)	1–0	Spartak Tambov (III)
Podolye Podolsky district (III)	0–0 (a.e.t.) (3–5 p)	FC Kaluga (III)
Rusichi Oryol (III)	4–2 (a.e.t.)	FC Khimik Novomoskovsk (IV)

=== Section East ===
Team 1	Score	Team 2
Sibir-2 Novosibirsk (III)	2–1 (a.e.t.)	Sibiryak Bratsk (III)
Metallurg-Kuzbass Novokuznetsk (III)	2–1	KUZBASS Kemerovo (III)
Smena Komsomolsk-na-Amure (III)	3–0	Amur-2010 Blagoveshchensk (III)
Mostovik-Primorye Ussuriysk (III)	1–0	Sakhalin Yuzhno-Sakhalinsk (III)

=== Section South ===
Team 1	Score	Team 2
Alania-d Vladikavkaz (III)	0–2	FAYUR Beslan (III)
Dagdizel Kaspiysk (III)	1–0	Angusht Nazran (III)
Mashuk-KMV Pyatigorsk (III)	1–4	Dynamo Stavropol (III)
FC Astrakhan (III)	3–2	Kavkaztransgaz-2005 Ryzdvyany (III)
SKA Rostov-on-Don (III)	2–1 (a.e.t.)	MITOS Novocherkassk (III)
Rotor Volgograd (III)	1–0	Energiya Volzhsky (III)
Torpedo Armavir (III)	2–0	Olimpia Gelendzhik
Druzhba Maykop (III)	1–4	Biolog-Novokubansk Progress (III)

=== Section Ural-Povolzhye ===
Team 1	Score	Team 2
Khimik Dzerzhinsk (III)	3–0	Dynamo Kirov (III)
Akademiya Togliatti (III)	2–3 (a.e.t.)	Volga Ulyanovsk (III)
Oktan Perm (III)	1–0	Zenit-Izhevsk Izhevsk (III)
Rubin-2 Kazan (III)	0–1	Neftekhimik Nizhnekamsk (III)
Syzran-2003 Syzran (III)	0–0 (a.e.t.) (4–3 p)	FC Ufa (III)
FC Chelyabinsk (III)	3–0	FC Nosta Novotroitsk (III)

== Third round ==
In this round entered 27 winners from the second round and the remaining 21 Second Division teams. The matches were played between 10 and 23 May 2011.

=== Section West ===
Team 1	Score	Team 2
Dynamo Vologda (III)	1–3	Spartak Kostroma
Sheksna Cherepovets (III)	0–0 (a.e.t.) (4–5 p)	Tekstilshchik Ivanovo
Saturn-2 Moscow Oblast	0–0 (a.e.t.) (5–6 p)	FC Istra (III)
Lokomotiv-2 Moscow (III)	1–1 (a.e.t.) (4–2 p)	Dnepr Smolensk
Petrotrest Saint Petersburg (III)	0–1	Sever Murmansk
Volga Tver	0–0 (a.e.t.) (5–4 p)	Pskov-747 Pskov (III)

=== Section Center ===
Team 1	Score	Team 2
Salyut Belgorod (III)	1–3	Avangard Kursk (III)
Metallurg-Oskol Stary Oskol (III)	2–1	FC Gubkin (III)
Metallurg Lipetsk (III)	4–0	Lokomotiv Liski
FC Kaluga	1–1 (a.e.t.) (4–5 p)	Vityaz Podolsk (III)
Sokol Saratov (III)	0–0 (a.e.t.) (4–5 p)	Zenit Penza (III)
Zvezda Ryazan (III)	0–1	Rusichi Oryol

=== Section South ===
Team 1	Score	Team 2
FAYUR Beslan	2–0	Dagdizel Kaspiysk
Dynamo Stavropol	1–2	FC Astrakhan
SKA Rostov-on-Don	0–1	Rotor Volgograd
Biolog-Novokubansk Progress	0–1	Torpedo Armavir

=== Section Ural-Povolzhye ===
Team 1	Score	Team 2
Volga Ulyanovsk	2–2 (a.e.t.) (5–4 p)	Khimik Dzerzhinsk
Neftekhimik Nizhnekamsk	1–0	Oktan Perm
Gornyak Uchaly (III)	3–2	Syzran-2003 Syzran
FC Tyumen (III)	2–2 (a.e.t.) (3–4 p)	FC Chelyabinsk

=== Section East ===
Team 1	Score	Team 2
Irtysh Omsk (III)	1–0 (a.e.t.)	Sibir-2 Novosibirsk
Dynamo Barnaul (III)	2–3	Metallurg-Kuzbass Novokuznetsk
Radian-Baikal Irkutsk (III)	3–1	FC Chita (III)
Mostovik-Primorye Ussuriysk	1–1 (a.e.t.) (2–4 p)	Smena Komsomolsk-na-Amure

== Fourth round ==
In this round entered 24 winners the third round. The matches were played between 4 and 16 June 2011.

=== Section West ===
Team 1	Score	Team 2
Spartak Kostroma	0–2	Tekstilshchik Ivanovo
FC Istra	1–0	Lokomotiv-2 Moscow
Volga Tver	4–0	Sever Murmansk

=== Section Center ===
Team 1	Score	Team 2
Avangard Kursk	1–2	Metallurg-Oskol Stary Oskol
Vityaz Podolsk	2–1	Metallurg Lipetsk
Zenit Penza	1–2	Rusichi Oryol

=== Section South ===
Team 1	Score	Team 2
FC Astrakhan	2–3	FAYUR Beslan
Torpedo Armavir	2–1	Rotor Volgograd

=== Section Ural-Povolzhye ===
Team 1	Score	Team 2
Volga Ulyanovsk	1–0	Neftekhimik Nizhnekamsk
FC Chelyabinsk	3–0	Gornyak Uchaly

=== Section East ===
Team 1	Score	Team 2
Metallurg-Kuzbass Novokuznetsk	3–0	Irtysh Omsk
Smena Komsomolsk-na-Amure	0–1	Radian-Baikal Irkutsk

== Fifth round ==
The 12 winners from the fourth round and the 20 FNL teams entered this round. The matches were played on 4 and 5 July 2011.

Team 1	Score	Team 2
FC Istra	2–1	Volga Tver
Shinnik Yaroslavl (II)	2–1	Baltika Kaliningrad (II)
Rusichi Oryol	1–3	Torpedo Vladimir (II)
Tekstilshchik Ivanovo	0–1	FC Nizhny Novgorod (II)
Vityaz Podolsk	0–2	FC Khimki (II)
Dynamo Bryansk (II)	2–0	Torpedo Moscow (II)
KAMAZ Naberezhnye Chelny (II)	1–2	Mordovia Saransk (II)
Volga Ulyanovsk	1–1 (a.e.t.) (8–7 p)	Gazovik Orenburg (II)
Alania Vladikavkaz (II)	0–1	Volgar-Gazprom Astrakhan (II)
FAYUR Beslan	1–2	Fakel Voronezh (II)
Metallurg-Oskol Stary Oskol	1–1 (a.e.t.) (5–4 p)	Chernomorets Novorossiysk (II)
Torpedo Armavir	3–4	Zhemchuzhina Sochi (II)
Sibir Novosibirsk (II)	0–1	Ural Sverdlovsk Oblast (II)
Metallurg–Kuzbass Novokuznetsk	2–0	FC Chelyabinsk
Yenisey Krasnoyarsk (II)	1–0	SKA-Energiya Khabarovsk (II)
Radian-Baikal Irkutsk	1–2	Luch-Energiya Vladivostok (II)

== Round of 32 ==
The 16 winners from the fifth round hosted the Russian Premier League teams in this round. The matches were played on 17 July 2011.

17 July 2011	FC Istra	0–1	Spartak Moscow	Moscow
16:00		Report	Welliton 45+'	Stadium: Eduard Streltsov Stadium; Attendance: 8,000; Referee: Aleksandr Gonchar

17 July 2011	Shinnik Yaroslavl	0–1	Volga Nizhny Novgorod	Yaroslavl
18:00		Report	Salukvadze 68'	Stadium: Shinnik Stadium; Attendance: 4,800; Referee: Sergey Lapochkin

17 July 2011	Torpedo Vladimir	3–0	Spartak Nalchik	Vladimir
19:00	Delkin 8', 65'; Zinin 44'	Report	Kazharov (red card) 89'	Stadium: Torpedo Stadium; Attendance: 7,700; Referee: Stanislav Sukhina

17 July 2011	FC Nizhny Novgorod	0–2	Terek Grozny	Grozny
19:30		Report	Katsayev 60' (pen.); Sadayev 72'	Stadium: Akhmat-Arena; Attendance: 10,000; Referee: Vitali Meshkov

17 July 2011	FC Khimki	2–3	Zenit Saint Petersburg	Khimki
18:00	Navalovski 39'; Voronkin 81' (pen.)	Report	Danny 7'; Fayzulin 16'; Bukharov 68'	Stadium: Arena Khimki; Attendance: 5,500; Referee: Almir Kayumov

17 July 2011	Dynamo Bryansk	3–1 (a.e.t.)	Kuban Krasnodar	Bryansk
19:00	Sorokin 90+3' (pen.); Junuzović 94'; Temnikov 96'	Report	Davydov 83'	Stadium: Dynamo Stadium; Attendance: 7,932; Referee: Maksim Layushkin

17 July 2011	Mordovia Saransk	0–5	Dynamo Moscow	Saransk
18:00		Report	Semshov 37'; Voronin 66'; Kokorin 72'; Karyaka 79', 90'	Stadium: Start Stadium; Attendance: 7,486; Referee: Igor Egorov

17 July 2011	Volga Ulyanovsk	0–3	Anzhi Makhachkala	Ulyanovsk
19:00		Report	Gadzhibekov 30'; Ahmedov 41'; Roberto Carlos 58'	Stadium: Trud Stadium; Attendance: 8,712; Referee: Sergei Kuznetsov

17 July 2011	Volgar-Gazprom Astrakhan	1–0	CSKA Moscow	Astrakhan
19:00	Chochiyev 88'	Report	V. Berezutski (red card) 90'	Stadium: Central Stadium; Attendance: 16,500; Referee: Aleksandr Yegorov

17 July 2011	Fakel Voronezh	2–1	FC Krasnodar	Voronezh
20:00	Mikhalyov 13'; Abroskin 24'	Report	Erokhin 55'	Stadium: Tsentralnyi Profsoyuz Stadion; Attendance: 11,300; Referee: Vladimir Rogulev

17 July 2011	Metallurg-Oskol Stary Oskol	0–1	Tom Tomsk	Stary Oskol
17:00		Report	Kovalchuk 25'	Stadium: PromAgro Stadium; Attendance: 5,200; Referee: Timur Arslanbekov

17 July 2011	Zhemchuzhina-Sochi	1–2	FC Rostov	Sochi
19:00	Papadopulos 86' (pen.)	Report	Grigoryev 58'; Ivanov 69'	Stadium: Central Stadium; Attendance: 8,800; Referee: Vyacheslav Kharlamov

17 July 2011	Ural Sverdlovsk Oblast	0–0 (a.e.t.) (5–6 p)	Rubin Kazan	Yekaterinburg
15:00		Report		Stadium: Uralmash Stadium; Attendance: 11,500; Referee: Aleksei Reznikov
	Penalties
	Tumasyan (penalty missed); Zabolotny (penalty scored); Safronidi (penalty scored); Semakin (penalty scored); Shatov (penalty scored); Lungu (penalty scored); Novikov (penalty missed)		(penalty scored) Medvedev; (penalty scored) Dzhalilov; (penalty scored) Ansaldi; (penalty scored) Karadeniz; (penalty missed) Nemov; (penalty scored) Kislyak; (penalty scored) Makhmutov

17 July 2011	Metallurg-Kuzbass Novokuznetsk	0–1	Amkar Perm	Novokuznetsk
15:00		Report	Kolomeytsev 32'	Stadium: Metallurg Stadium; Attendance: 8,000; Referee: Igor Nizovtsev

17 July 2011	Yenisey Krasnoyarsk	0–2	Lokomotiv Moscow	Krasnoyarsk
13:00		Report	Ignatyev 3'; Maicon 14'	Stadium: Central Stadium; Attendance: 16,000; Referee: Vasili Miroshnichenko

17 July 2011	Luch-Energiya Vladivostok	1–0 (a.e.t.)	Krylia Sovetov Samara	Vladivostok
12:00	Slavnov 109'	Report		Stadium: Dynamo Stadium; Attendance: 7,800; Referee: German Kravchenko

== Round of 16 ==
In this round the 16 winners from the round of 32 round enter. The matches was played on 20 and 21 September 2011.

21 September 2011	Spartak Moscow	1–1 (a.e.t.) (5–6 p)	Volga Nizhny Novgorod	Moscow
20:45	McGeady 4'	Report	Bibilov 86'	Stadium: Luzhniki Stadium; Attendance: 5,102; Referee: Sergei Kuznetsov
	Penalties
	D. Kombarov (penalty scored); Pareja (penalty missed) de Zeeuw (penalty scored); Sheshukov (penalty scored); Rodri (penalty scored); Carioca (penalty scored); Welliton (penalty missed)		(penalty scored) Crosas; (penalty scored) Javadov; (penalty scored) Bibilov; (penalty missed) Grigalava; (penalty scored) Buivolov; (penalty scored) Pashtov; (penalty scored) Bondar

21 September 2011	Terek Grozny	2–0	Torpedo Vladimir	Grozny
16:30	Pavlenko 49'; Mguni 57'	Report		Stadium: Terek Stadium; Attendance: 12,700; Referee: Vyacheslav Kharlamov

21 September 2011	Zenit Saint Petersburg	2–0	Dynamo Bryansk	Saint Petersburg
20:00	Bukharov 8'; Mukhutdinov 44' (o.g.)	Report		Stadium: Petrovsky Stadium; Attendance: 17,000; Referee: Vitali Meshkov

21 September 2011	Dynamo Moscow	1–0	Anzhi Makhachkala	Khimki
19:00	Kokorin 103'	Report		Stadium: Arena Khimki; Attendance: 11,262; Referee: Eduard Malyi

20 September 2011	Fakel Voronezh	2–0	Volgar-Gazprom Astrakhan	Voronezh
18:00	Abroskin 26'; Akopyants 65'	Report		Stadium: Tsentralnyi Profsoyuz Stadion; Attendance: 12,000; Referee: Vyacheslav Popov

21 September 2011	FC Rostov	3–1	Tom Tomsk	Rostov-on-Don
19:00	Saláta 22'; Bracamonte 42'; Grigoryev 81'	Report	Savin 48'	Stadium: Olimp - 2 Attendance: 6,500; Referee: Vladimir Rogulyov

21 September 2011	Amkar Perm	0–2	Rubin Kazan	Perm
17:00		Report	Lebedenko 10'; Kasaev 25'	Stadium: Zvezda Stadium; Attendance: 6,400; Referee: Igor Fedotov

21 September 2011	Lokomotiv Moscow	1–0	Luch-Energiya Vladivostok	Moscow
19:30	A. Ivanov 60' (pen.)	Report		Stadium: Lokomotiv Stadium; Attendance: 10,082; Referee: Aleksei Reznikov

== Quarter-finals ==
21 March 2012	Rubin Kazan	4–0	Lokomotiv Moscow	Grozny
18:30	Karadeniz 30', 70'; Ryazantsev 49'; Davydov 81'	Report		Stadium: Akhmat-Arena; Attendance: 13,400; Referee: Vitali Meshkov
Note: Rubin played their home game in Grozny due to bad pitch conditions in Kazan.

21 March 2012	Zenit Saint Petersburg	0–1	Dynamo Moscow	Saint Petersburg
20:30		Report	Misimović 73' (pen.)	Stadium: Petrovsky Stadium; Attendance: 19,600; Referee: Aleksandr Yegorov

22 March 2012	Volga Nizhny Novgorod	2–1 (a.e.t.)	Terek Grozny	Volgograd
14:00	Bendz 68'; Karyaka 98' (pen.)	Report	Asildarov 45+5'	Stadium: Severny Stadium; Attendance: 2,200; Referee: Timur Arslanbekov

22 March 2012	FC Rostov	0–0 (a.e.t.) (4–3 p)	Fakel Voronezh	Rostov-on-Don
19:30		Report		Stadium: Olimp - 2 Attendance: 6,000; Referee: Sergey Kuznetsov
	Penalties
	Élson (penalty missed); Gațcan (penalty scored); Bracamonte (penalty scored); Cociș (penalty scored); Adamov (penalty missed); Kruglov (penalty missed); Saláta (penalty scored)		(penalty missed) Kantonistov; (penalty missed) Gitselov; (penalty scored) Klopkov; (penalty scored) Zhitnikov; (penalty scored) Gavryuk; (penalty missed) Ediyev; (penalty missed) Khabarov

== Semi-finals ==
11 April 2012	Rubin Kazan	2–0	FC Rostov	Kazan
18:00	Bocchetti 81'; Smolnikov 82' (o.g.)	Report		Stadium: Tsentralnyi Stadion; Attendance: 7,400; Referee: Aleksei Nikolaev

11 April 2012	Dynamo Moscow	2–1	Volga Nizhny Novgorod	Moscow
20:00	Misimović 73' (pen.); Voronin 86'	Report	Karyaka 19'	Stadium: BSA Dynamo; Attendance: 8,754; Referee: Maksim Layushkin

== Final ==
9 May 2012
15:00

Dynamo Moscow	0–1	Rubin Kazan
	Report	R. Eremenko 78'

Tsentralnyi Stadion, Yekaterinburg
Attendance: 27,000
Referee: Mikhail Vilkov

Dynamo	Rubin

GK	1	(Russia) Anton Shunin
DF	4	(Belarus) Igor Shitov	(substituted off) 63'
DF	6	(Argentina) Leandro Fernández
DF	13	(Russia) Vladimir Granat
DF	33	(Russia) Vladimir Rykov
MF	7	(Hungary) Balázs Dzsudzsák
MF	8	(Bosnia and Herzegovina) Zvjezdan Misimović	(substituted off) 82'
MF	19	(Russia) Aleksandr Samedov
MF	21	(Russia) Igor Semshov	(yellow card) 38'
FW	10	(Ukraine) Andriy Voronin (c)
FW	22	(Germany) Kevin Kurányi
Substitutes:
GK	16	(Russia) Yevgeni Frolov
DF	5	(Moldova) Alexandru Epureanu	(substituted on) 63'
MF	12	(Belarus) Pavel Nyakhaychyk
MF	26	(Ecuador) Christian Noboa
MF	41	(Russia) Aleksandr Sapeta
FW	9	(Russia) Aleksandr Kokorin	(substituted on) 82'
FW	27	(Russia) Fyodor Smolov
Manager:
(Russia) Sergei Silkin Assistant referees: Igor Lapidus (Elista); Oleg Polgazov (Yoshkar-Ola)

GK	1	(Russia) Sergey Ryzhikov
DF	2	(Russia) Oleg Kuzmin
DF	3	(Argentina) Cristian Ansaldi
DF	4	(Spain) César Navas	(yellow card) 45'
DF	76	(Russia) Roman Sharonov	(yellow card) 44'
MF	8	(Russia) Aleksandr Ryazantsev
MF	23	(Finland) Roman Eremenko	(yellow card) 78'
MF	61	(Turkey) Gökdeniz Karadeniz	(substituted off) 90+'
MF	66	(Israel) Bibras Natcho
FW	18	(Paraguay) Nelson Haedo Valdez	(substituted off) 90'
FW	25	(Russia) Vladimir Dyadyun	(substituted off) 87'
Substitutes:
GK	88	(Iran) Alireza Haghighi
DF	19	(Russia) Vitali Kaleshin
DF	27	(Italy) Salvatore Bocchetti	(substituted on) 87'
MF	7	(Russia) Pyotr Bystrov	(substituted on) 90+'
MF	9	(Russia) Pyotr Nemov
MF	77	(Russia) Nikita Bocharov
FW	28	(Russia) Sergei Davydov	(substituted on) 90'
Manager:
(Russia) Kurban Berdyev

Played in the earlier stages, but were not on the final game squad:

FC Dynamo Moscow: (Serbia) Marko Lomić (DF), (Australia) Luke Wilkshire (DF), Andrei Karyaka (MF), Artur Yusupov (MF).

FC Rubin Kazan: (Georgia (country)) Solomon Kvirkvelia (DF), (Spain) Jonatan Valle (MF), Alisher Dzhalilov (MF), (Finland) Aleksei Eremenko (MF), Alan Kasaev (MF), (Belarus) Syarhey Kislyak (MF), Ruslan Makhmutov (MF), (Ecuador) Christian Noboa (MF), (Moldova) Alexandru Antoniuc (FW), Igor Lebedenko (FW), (Nigeria) Obafemi Martins (FW), Aleksei Medvedev (FW).
