= Ionov (surname) =

Ionov (Russian: Ионов, masculine) and Ionova (Russian: Ионова, feminine) is a Russian surname. It is shared by the following people:

- Aleksandr Vladimirovich Ionov (born 1983), Russian football player
- Aleksei Sergeyevich Ionov (born 1989), Russian footballer
- Alexander Viktorovich Ionov (born 1989), Russian businessman and political figure
- Anatoli Semyonovich Ionov (1939–2019), Soviet ice hockey player
- Anatoly Ionov (born 1936), Romanov claimant
- Ilya Ionov (born 1985), Russian football player
- Konstantin Ionov (born 1983), Russian football player
- Mariya Mykolayevna Ionova (born 1978 in Kyiv), Ukrainian politician
- Maksim Ionov (born 1976), Russian footballer.
- Natalya Ilinichna Ionova (born 1986), Russian singer with stage name Glukoza
