= Aleksandr Nechayev =

Aleksandr Nechayev is the name of:

- Aleksandr Nikolaevich Nechayev (1902–1986), Russian and Soviet folklorist
- Aleksandr Petrovich Nechayev, Russian psychologist, one of the founders of experimental pedagogy in Russia
- Aleksandr Yevgenyevich Nechayev (born 1989), Russian footballer with FC Saturn Moscow Oblast and FC Sokol-Saratov
- Aleksandr Vladimirovich Nechayev (born 1987), Russian footballer with FC Rostov, FC Krasnodar and FC SKA-Energiya Khabarovsk
- Alexander Nechayev (politician), acting mayor of Yaroslavl
- Alyaksandr Nyachayew (born 1994), Belarusian footballer

== See also ==
- Nechayev
- Oleksandr Nechayev (born 1963), Ukrainian politician
