= Ilya Ionov =

Russian footballer

Personal information
- Full name: Ilya Viktorovich Ionov
- Date of birth: 27 July 1985 (age 41)
- Place of birth: Volzhsky, Volgograd Oblast, Russian SFSR
- Height: 1.86 m (6 ft 1 in)
- Position: Defender

Team information
- Current team: FC Rotor Volgograd (technical assistant)

Senior career*
Years	Team	Apps	(Gls)
2004	FC Torpedo Volzhsky	0	(0)
2005	FC Torpedo-2 Volzhsky		
2007–2009	FC Energiya Volzhsky	78	(5)
2010–2013	FC Rotor Volgograd	56	(6)
2014	FC Torpedo Armavir	11	(0)
2014–2015	FC Rotor Volgograd	19	(3)
2015	FC Karelia Petrozavodsk	2	(0)
2015	FC Berkut Armyansk		
2016–2018	FC Rotor Volgograd	45	(6)
2018	FC Syzran-2003	13	(3)
2019–2020	FC Rotor Volgograd	3	(0)
2020–2021	FC Dynamo Stavropol	25	(0)

Managerial career
- 2021–: FC Rotor Volgograd (technical assistant)
- * Club domestic league appearances and goals

Ilya Viktorovich Ionov (Russian: Илья Викторович Ионов; born 27 July 1985) is a Russian professional football official and a former player who played as a defender. He works as a technical assistant with FC Rotor Volgograd.

== Club career ==
Started player career in second russian league Russian Professional Football League with FC Torpedo Volzhsky like his father Viktor Ionov at 2004.

He made his Russian Football National League debut for FC Rotor Volgograd on 27 March 2010 in a game against FC Volga Nizhny Novgorod.

Played with FC Rotor Volgograd until 2013, and moved to FC Torpedo Armavir, returned to Rotor at 2015. After Rotor reorganisation played one season at FC Karelia Petrozavodsk. When Rotor return to Russian Football National League, returned to club.

== Family ==
Viktor Ionov, father, football player.

Maxim Ionov, brother, football player.
