= Vasili Igumnov =

Russian footballer

Personal information
- Full name: Vasili Alekseyevich Igumnov
- Date of birth: 27 May 1987 (age 39)
- Height: 1.96 m (6 ft 5 in)
- Position: Defender

Senior career*
| Years | Team | Apps | (Gls) |
| 2008 | FC Energiya Volzhsky | 15 | (0) |
| 2009–2010 | FC Chernomorets Novorossiysk | 2 | (0) |
| 2009 | → FC Zodiak-Oskol Stary Oskol (loan) | 10 | (0) |
| 2010 | → FC Energiya Volzhsky (loan) | 25 | (1) |
| 2011 | FC Sakhalin Yuzhno-Sakhalinsk | 25 | (0) |
| 2012 | FC Slavyansky Slavyansk-na-Kubani | 1 | (0) |
| 2012–2013 | FC Piter Saint Petersburg | 7 | (0) |
| 2014 | FC Sibiryak Bratsk | 4 | (0) |
- * Club domestic league appearances and goals

Vasili Alekseyevich Igumnov (Russian: Василий Алексеевич Игумнов; born 27 May 1987) is a former Russian professional football player.

== Club career ==
He played in the Russian Football National League for FC Chernomorets Novorossiysk in 2009.
