= Vladimir Sandrkin =

Russian footballer (born 1992)

Personal information
- Full name: Vladimir Petrovich Sandrkin
- Date of birth: 7 June 1992 (age 34)
- Height: 1.79 m (5 ft 10 1/2 in)
- Position: Striker

Youth career
- FC Mordovia Saransk

Senior career*
Years	Team	Apps	(Gls)
2009	FC Mordovia-2 Saransk		
2010–2012	FC Mordovia Saransk	1	(0)
2013–2014	FC Energiya Volzhsky	26	(2)
- * Club domestic league appearances and goals

Vladimir Petrovich Sandrkin (Russian: Владимир Петрович Сандркин; born 7 June 1992) is a former Russian football striker.

== Club career ==
He made his Russian Football National League debut for FC Mordovia Saransk on 24 June 2011 in a game against FC Alania Vladikavkaz.
