= Igumnov =

Igumnov (Russian: Игумнов, from игумен meaning hegumen) is a Russian masculine surname, its feminine counterpart is Igumnova. It may refer to

- Anton Igumnov, better known as Tony Igy, Russian electronic dance music disc jockey and producer
- Gennady Igumnov (1936–2021), Russian politician
- Konstantin Igumnov (1873–1948), Russian pianist
- Vasili Igumnov (born 1987), Russian football player

== See also ==
- Igumnov House
- Igumenov
