= Kirill Podpruzhnikov =

Russian footballer

Personal information
- Full name: Kirill Mikhailovich Podpruzhnikov
- Date of birth: 31 January 1984 (age 42)
- Place of birth: Leningrad, Russian SFSR
- Height: 1.85 m (6 ft 1 in)
- Positions: Midfielder; defender

Youth career
- Smena St. Petersburg

Senior career*
Years	Team	Apps	(Gls)
2001–2002	FC Zenit St. Petersburg	0	(0)
2003	FC Zenit-2 Saint Petersburg	10	(0)
2004–2005	FC Petrotrest St. Petersburg	22	(0)
2006	FC Zenit-2 Saint Petersburg	32	(1)
2007	FC Metallurg-Kuzbass Novokuznetsk	21	(0)
2008	FC Zenit-2 Saint Petersburg	25	(1)
2009	FC Dynamo Saint Petersburg	31	(2)
2010	FC Dynamo Bryansk	5	(0)
2010	FC Volyn Lutsk	0	(0)
2011–2012	FC Karelia Petrozavodsk	28	(3)
2013–2016	FC Zvezda St. Petersburg		
- * Club domestic league appearances and goals

Kirill Mikhailovich Podpruzhnikov (Russian: Кирилл Михайлович Подпружников; born 31 January 1984) is a former Russian professional football player.

== Club career ==
He made his Russian Football National League debut for FC Petrotrest St. Petersburg on 26 May 2005 in a game against FC Lokomotiv Chita.
