= Denis Zubko =

Russian footballer

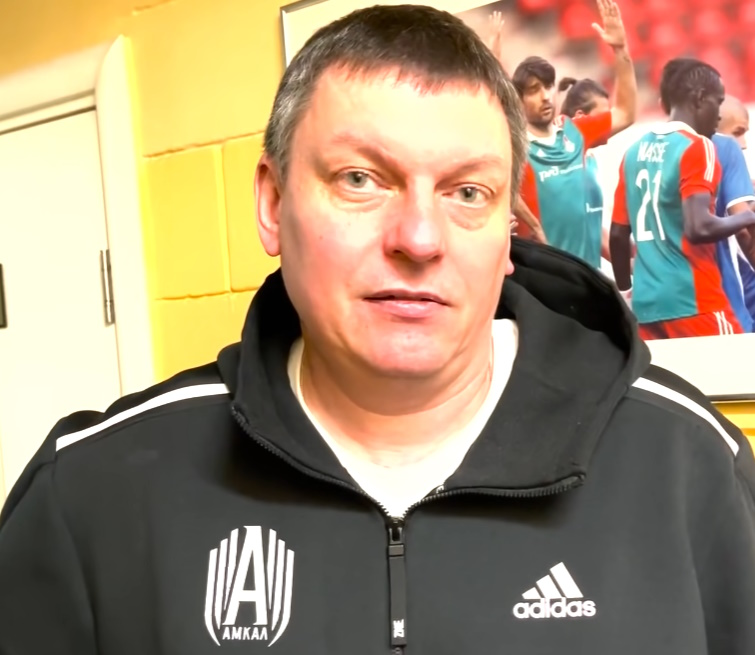
- Zubko in 2022

Personal information
- Full name: Denis Ivanovich Zubko
- Date of birth: 7 November 1974 (age 51)
- Place of birth: Petrozavodsk, Russian SFSR, Soviet Union
- Height: 1.92 m (6 ft 4 in)
- Position: Striker

Youth career
- 1981–1986: FC Olimpiya Petrozavodsk
- 1986–1991: DYuSSh-7 Petrozavodsk
- 1992–1993: UOR-1 St. Petersburg

Senior career*
Years	Team	Apps	(Gls)
1991	FC Spartak Petrozavodsk	13	(1)
1992–1993	FC Smena-Saturn Saint Petersburg	52	(9)
1993–1994	FC Baden	17	(5)
1994	FC Smena-Saturn Saint Petersburg	19	(6)
1995–1996	FC Zenit Saint Petersburg	49	(11)
1995	→ FC Zenit-d Saint Petersburg (loan)	2	(1)
1997–2004	FC Rotor Volgograd	192	(24)
1998–2000	→ FC Rotor-d Volgograd (loans)	3	(3)
2005–2006	FC Ural Yekaterinburg	64	(8)
2007	FC Terek Grozny	36	(8)
2008	FC Kuban Krasnodar	42	(18)
2009	FC Atyrau	25	(9)
2010	FC Ural Sverdlovsk Oblast	22	(3)
2011–2012	FC Rotor Volgograd	31	(7)
2012	FC Energiya Volzhsky	21	(2)

International career
1997–1998	Russia	4	(0)

Managerial career
- 2013: FC Energiya Volzhsky (assistant)
- 2013–2014: FC Energiya Volzhsky
- 2014–2015: FC Rotor Volgograd (assistant)
- 2015–2016: FC Karelia Petrozavodsk
- 2017–2019: FC Kolomna
- 2019–2022: FC Amkal Moscow (media club)
- * Club domestic league appearances and goals

Denis Ivanovich Zubko (Russian: Денис Иванович Зубко; born 7 November 1974) is a Russian association football coach and a former player who played striker.

== Honours ==
- Russian Premier League runner-up: 1997.
- Top 33 players year-end list: 1996.

== International career ==
Zubko played his first game for Russia on 30 April 1997 in a 1998 FIFA World Cup qualifier against Luxembourg. He played 3 more games for the national team.
