= Ivan Gerasimov =

Ivan Gerasimov may refer to:

- Ivan Gerasimov (footballer) (b. 1985), Russian footballer
- Ivan Herasymov (1921–2008), Soviet military general and Ukrainian politician
