= Roman Semyakin =

Russian footballer

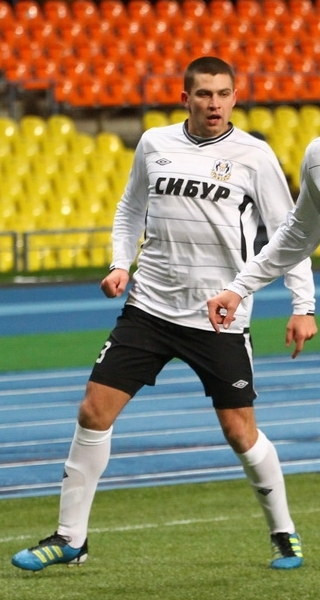

Personal information
- Full name: Roman Igorevich Semyakin
- Date of birth: 28 August 1985 (age 41)
- Place of birth: Volzhsky, Volgograd Oblast, Russian SFSR
- Height: 1.80 m (5 ft 11 in)
- Positions: Defender; midfielder

Youth career
- –2001: SDYuSShOR-4 Volzhsky

Senior career*
Years	Team	Apps	(Gls)
2002–2009	FC Energiya Volzhsky	147	(5)
2010	FC Metallurg-Oskol Stary Oskol	28	(1)
2011–2012	FC Rotor Volgograd	29	(0)
2012–2013	FC Tyumen	22	(1)
2013–2014	FC Sokol Saratov	39	(0)
2015	FC Oryol	1	(0)
2015–2018	FC Zenit-Izhevsk	74	(5)
2018	FC Murom	15	(1)
2019	FC Syzran-2003	1	(0)
2019–2021	PFC Dynamo Stavropol	41	(0)
- * Club domestic league appearances and goals

Roman Igorevich Semyakin (Russian: Роман Игоревич Семякин; born 28 August 1985) is a Russian former professional football player.

== Club career ==
He made his Russian Football National League debut for FC Sokol Saratov on 6 July 2014 in a game against FC Yenisey Krasnoyarsk.
