= Vitali Polevikov =

Russian footballer

Personal information
- Full name: Vitali Borisovich Polevikov
- Date of birth: 4 March 1989 (age 37)
- Place of birth: Russia
- Height: 1.86 m (6 ft 1 in)
- Position: Midfielder

Senior career*
Years	Team	Apps	(Gls)
2007–2008	Zenit-2 Saint Petersburg	49	(7)
2009–2012	Vityaz Podolsk	66	(7)
2012	FC Karelia Petrozavodsk	9	(0)
- * Club domestic league appearances and goals

Vitali Borisovich Polevikov (Russian: Виталий Борисович Полевиков; born 4 March 1989) is a former Russian professional footballer who played as a midfielder.

== Club career ==
He made his Russian Football National League debut for FC Vityaz Podolsk on 28 March 2009 in a game against FC Nosta Novotroitsk.
