= Nikita Glushkov (footballer, born 1992) =

Russian footballer

Personal information
- Full name: Nikita Vyacheslavovich Glushkov
- Date of birth: 9 June 1992 (age 34)
- Place of birth: Volgograd, Russia
- Height: 1.75 m (5 ft 9 in)
- Positions: Defender; midfielder

Youth career
- VKOR Volgograd
- FC Olimpia Volgograd

Senior career*
Years	Team	Apps	(Gls)
2009	FC Volgograd	2	(0)
2010	FC Energiya Volzhsky	27	(1)
2011–2014	FC Rotor Volgograd	59	(1)
2014	FC Zenit-Izhevsk Izhevsk	2	(0)
2014–2015	FC Torpedo Armavir	24	(1)
2015	FC Baltika Kaliningrad	17	(0)
2016	FC Armavir	20	(0)
2017	FC Afips Afipsky	19	(3)
2018	FC Kyzyltash Bakhchisaray		
2018	FC Khimik Novomoskovsk	15	(0)
2019	PFC Dynamo Stavropol	18	(1)
2020	FC Sevastopol		
2020–2021	FC Krymteplytsia Molodizhne		
2021	FC Dynamo Bryansk	2	(0)
2022	FC Mashuk-KMV Pyatigorsk	9	(1)
- * Club domestic league appearances and goals

Nikita Vyacheslavovich Glushkov (Russian: Никита Вячеславович Глушков; born 9 June 1992) is a Russian former professional football player.

== Club career ==
He made his Russian Football National League debut for FC Rotor Volgograd on 9 July 2012 in a game against FC Tom Tomsk.
