= Aleynik =

Aleynik is a surname. Notable people with the surname include:

- Oleg Aleynik (born 1989), Russian footballer
- Vladimir Aleynik (born 1952), Belarusian diver
