= Andrei Arlashin =

Russian professional footballer

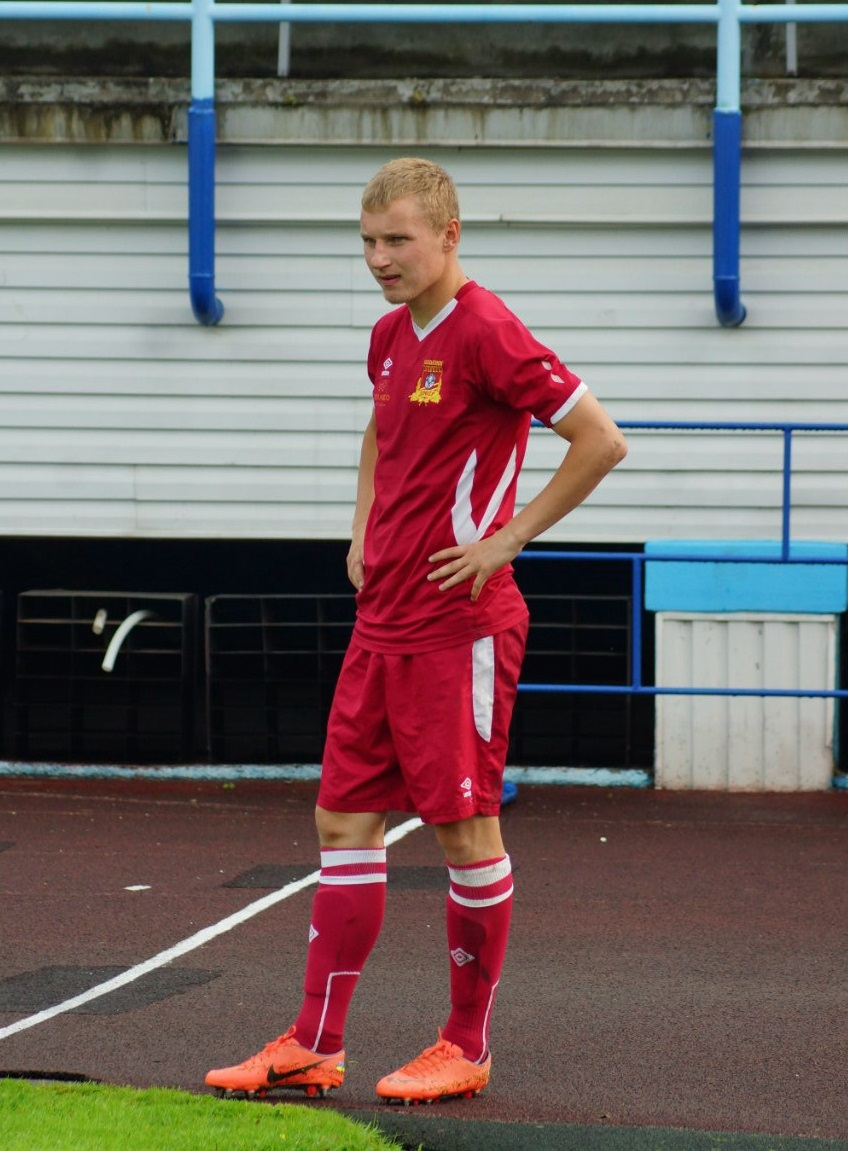

Personal information
- Full name: Andrei Alekseyevich Arlashin
- Date of birth: 21 February 1990 (age 36)
- Place of birth: Safonovo, Russian SFSR, Soviet Union (now Russian Federation)
- Height: 1.77 m (5 ft 10 in)
- Position: Midfielder

Senior career*
Years	Team	Apps	(Gls)
2009	FC Dnepr Smolensk	22	(3)
2010	FC Volochanin-Ratmir Vyshny Volochyok	17	(3)
2010–2012	FC Volga Tver	54	(10)
2012	FC Petrotrest St. Petersburg	7	(0)
2013	FC Dnepr Smolensk	19	(0)
2014	FC Daugava	24	(3)
2015	FC Spartak Kostroma	8	(0)
2015	FC Dnepr Smolensk	6	(0)
2016	FC Karelia Petrozavodsk	10	(0)
2016–2017	FC Kolomna	18	(2)
2017–2019	SSh Mozhaysk		
- * Club domestic league appearances and goals

Andrei Alekseyevich Arlashin (Russian: Андрей Алексеевич Арлашин; born 21 February 1990) is a Russian former professional footballer.

== Club career ==
He made his Russian Football National League debut for FC Petrotrest St. Petersburg on 9 July 2012 in a game against FC Ural Yekaterinburg.

== Personal life ==
He is a twin brother of Denis Arlashin.
