= Yevgeni Natalich =

Russian footballer

Personal information
- Full name: Yevgeni Aleksandrovich Natalich
- Date of birth: 5 July 1981 (age 45)
- Height: 1.91 m (6 ft 3 in)
- Positions: Midfielder; defender

Senior career*
Years	Team	Apps	(Gls)
1999–2000	Slavyansk Slavyansk-na-Kubani	21	(2)
2001	Nart Nartkala	32	(0)
2002	Dynamo Poltavskaya	18	(1)
2005	Mashuk-KMV Pyatigorsk	3	(0)
2006	Azovets Primorsko-Akhtarsk		
2007	Lokomotiv-KMV Mineralnye Vody (amateur)		
2007	Molniya Nebug		
2008	Okean Nakhodka	26	(1)
2009	Sever Murmansk	25	(1)
2010	SKA Rostov-on-Don	30	(2)
2011–2013	Slavyansky Slavyansk-na-Kubani	60	(16)
2013	Slavia Mozyr	2	(0)
2014–2015	Druzhba Maykop	29	(0)
2015–2016	Mashuk-KMV Pyatigorsk	20	(1)
2016–2017	Rubin Yalta	3	(0)
2017–2018	Dynamo Stavropol	16	(0)
- * Club domestic league appearances and goals

Yevgeni Aleksandrovich Natalich (Russian: Евгений Александрович Наталич; born 5 July 1981) is a former Russian professional football player.
