= Maksim Primak =

Russian footballer

Personal information
- Full name: Maksim Vladimirovich Primak
- Date of birth: 26 October 1981 (age 45)
- Height: 1.75 m (5 ft 9 in)
- Position: Midfielder

Senior career*
Years	Team	Apps	(Gls)
1999–2001	FC Torpedo Volzhsky	78	(4)
2002–2004	FC Uralan Elista	5	(0)
2005–2007	FC Irtysh Pavlodar	48	(1)
2008–2009	FC Volgar-Gazprom Astrakhan	35	(1)
2010	FC Torpedo Armavir	27	(1)
2011–2012	FC Rotor Volgograd	19	(2)
2012–2013	FC Energiya Volzhsky	12	(1)
2013–2014	FC Gazprom transgaz Stavropol Ryzdvyany	28	(1)
- * Club domestic league appearances and goals

Maksim Vladimirovich Primak (Russian: Максим Владимирович Примак; born 26 October 1981) is a Russian former professional footballer.

== Club career ==
He made his debut in the Russian Premier League in 2002 for FC Uralan Elista.
