= Nikita Mertsalov =

Russian footballer

Personal information
- Full name: Nikita Sergeyevich Mertsalov
- Date of birth: 25 March 1990 (age 36)
- Place of birth: Astrakhan, Russian SFSR
- Height: 1.74 m (5 ft 8 1/2 in)
- Position: Striker

Senior career*
Years	Team	Apps	(Gls)
2007–2012	FC Volgar-Gazprom Astrakhan	13	(0)
2011–2012	→ FC Astrakhan (loan)	9	(0)
2012–2013	FC Volgar Astrakhan	14	(0)
- * Club domestic league appearances and goals

Nikita Sergeyevich Mertsalov (Russian: Никита Серге́евич Мерцалов; born 25 March 1990) is a former Russian professional football player.

== Club career ==
He played in the Russian Football National League for FC Volgar-Gazprom Astrakhan in 2009.
