= Nechayev =

Nechayev or Nechaev (Russian: Нечаев), feminine: Nechayeva/Nechaeva is a Russian patronymic surname dereved from the name Nechay with the Slavic patronymic suffix '-ev'. Notable people with the surname include:

- Aleksandr Nikolaevich Nechayev (1902–1986), Russian and Soviet folklorist
- Aleksandr Petrovich Nechayev, Russian psychologist, one of the founders of experimental pedagogy in Russia
- Aleksandr Yevgenyevich Nechayev (born 1989), Russian footballer with FC Saturn Moscow Oblast and FC Sokol-Saratov
- Aleksandr Vladimirovich Nechayev (born 1987), Russian footballer with FC Rostov, FC Krasnodar and FC SKA-Energiya Khabarovsk
- Alexander Nechayev (politician), acting mayor of Yaroslavl
- Alyaksandr Nyachayew (born 1994), Belarusian footballer
- Alexey Nechayev (born 1966), Russian entrepreneur and politician
- Anastasia Nechaeva, Russian snooker and pool player
- Anna Nechaeva (born 1976), Russian soprano singer
- Andrey Nechayev (born 1953), Russian politician, scientist and economist
- Anna Nechaeva (born 1976), Russian soprano singer
- Elina Nechayeva (born 1991), Estonian singer
- Klavdiya Nechaeva, Soviet fighter pilot during World War II
- Konstantin Petrovich Nechaev (1883–1946), Russian Imperial Army officer and White émigré
- Konstantin Vladimirovich Nechaev or Pitirim Nechaev (1926-2003), Russian Orthodox Church bishop and metropolitan
- Leonid Nechayev (1939–2010), Russian children's film director
- Marina Nechaeva or Marina Guseva (born 1986), Russian chess player
- Oleg Nechayev (born 1971), Russian football coach and a former player
- Oleksandr Nechayev (born 1963), Ukrainian politician
- Pyotr Nechayev (1842–1905), Russian religious writer and lecturer
- Sergei Nechaev (1847–1882), Russian revolutionary
- Stepan Nechayev (1792–1860), Russian historian
- Victor Nechayev (born 1955), Russian ice hockey player
- Viktor Nechaev (born 1972), Russian rugby league player
- Vladimir Nechaev (1908–1969), Soviet singer
- Yaroslava Nechaeva, Russian ice dancer
- Yelena Nechayeva (born 1979), Russian fencer
- Yury Nechaev-Maltsov (1834–1913), Russian glassware manufacturer, landlord and patron of art
