= Kosenko =

Kosenko (Ukrainian and Russian: Косенко) is a Russian and Ukrainian surname.

- Alexis Kossenko (born 1977), French musician
- Dmitry Sergeyevich Kosenko (born 1986), Russian footballer
- Ihor Kosenko, Ukrainian Paralympic footballer
- Mikhail Kosenko (born 1975), Russian activist
- Viktor Kosenko (1896–1938), Ukrainian composer

== See also ==
- Kosenkov
