= Aleksandr Grantovskiy =

Russian footballer

Personal information
- Full name: Aleksandr Vasilyevich Grantovskiy
- Date of birth: 15 March 1978 (age 48)
- Place of birth: Krasnodar, Soviet Union
- Height: 1.75 m (5 ft 9 in)
- Positions: Midfielder; forward

Senior career*
Years	Team	Apps	(Gls)
1996	FC Zhemchuzhina-d Sochi	25	(2)
1997–1998	FC Zvezda Irkutsk	27	(1)
1999–2001	FC Spartak Shchyolkovo	102	(10)
2002	FC Pskov-2000	28	(1)
2003–2004	FC Vityaz Krymsk	44	(1)
2004–2005	FC Volgar-Gazprom Astrakhan	44	(6)
2006	FC Chernomorets Novorossiysk	17	(0)
2007	FC Sudostroitel Astrakhan	22	(1)
2008	FC Olimpia Volgograd	31	(0)
2009	FC SKA Rostov-on-Don	17	(4)
2009	FC Astrakhan	10	(0)
2010	FC SKA Rostov-on-Don	25	(2)
2011–2013	FC Slavyansky Slavyansk-na-Kubani	55	(6)
2013	FC Astrakhan	13	(1)
- * Club domestic league appearances and goals

Aleksandr Vasilyevich Grantovskiy (Russian: Александр Васильевич Грантовский; born 15 March 1978) is a former Russian professional football player.

== Club career ==
He played in the Russian Football National League for FC Volgar-Gazprom Astrakhan in 2005.
