= Dmitri Piskunov =

Russian footballer and coach

Personal information
- Full name: Dmitri Vladimirovich Piskunov
- Date of birth: 3 April 1969 (age 57)
- Place of birth: Perm, Russian SFSR
- Height: 1.79 m (5 ft 10 1/2 in)
- Positions: Defender; midfielder

Youth career
- SDYuSShOR-4 Volzhsky

Senior career*
Years	Team	Apps	(Gls)
1985–1986	FC Torpedo Volzhsky	12	(0)
1986	FC Rotor Volgograd	3	(0)
1987–1988	FC Torpedo Volzhsky	46	(1)
1989	FC SKA Rostov-on-Don	8	(0)
1990–1997	FC Torpedo Volzhsky	289	(47)
1996	→ FC Energiya-Tekstilshchik Kamyshin (loan)	2	(0)
1998–1999	FC Lada-Simbirsk Dimitrovgrad	72	(2)
2000–2001	FC Nosta Novotroitsk	55	(8)
2002–2003	FC Gazovik Orenburg	45	(6)
2003–2008	FC Torpedo Volzhsky	130	(25)

Managerial career
- 2009–2013: FC Energiya Volzhsky (assistant)
- 2013: FC Energiya Volzhsky
- 2014: FC Energiya Volzhsky (assistant)
- * Club domestic league appearances and goals

Dmitri Vladimirovich Piskunov (Russian: Дмитрий Владимирович Пискунов; born 3 April 1969) is a Russian professional football coach and a former player.
