= Pavel Orlov =

Russian footballer

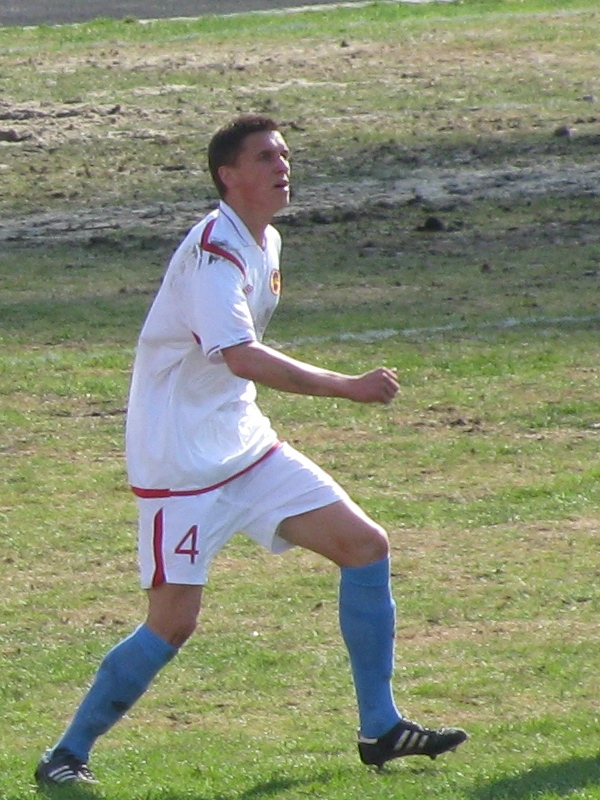

Personal information
- Full name: Pavel Maratovich Orlov
- Date of birth: 8 December 1992 (age 33)
- Place of birth: Kamyshin, Russia
- Height: 1.91 m (6 ft 3 in)
- Position: Defender

Youth career
- –2008: UOR Master-Saturn Yegoryevsk
- 2008–2010: VKOR Volgograd

Senior career*
Years	Team	Apps	(Gls)
2009–2010	FC Volgograd	0	(0)
2010	→ FC Energiya Volzhsky (loan)	25	(1)
2011	FC MITOS Novocherkassk	5	(0)
2011–2012	FC Energiya Volzhsky	15	(1)
2012–2013	FC Mordovia Saransk	0	(0)
2013	FC Jūrmala	14	(2)
2014–2015	FC Nosta Novotroitsk	32	(4)
2015–2016	FC Solyaris Moscow	13	(1)
2016	FC Tambov	3	(0)
2017	FC Zenit-Izhevsk	8	(0)
2017–2018	FC Luki-Energiya Velikiye Luki	25	(3)
- * Club domestic league appearances and goals

Pavel Maratovich Orlov (Russian: Павел Маратович Орлов; born 8 December 1992) is a Russian former professional football player.

== Club career ==
He made his Russian Football National League debut for FC Tambov on 27 July 2016 in a game against FC Mordovia Saransk.
