= Sergei Zangareev =

Russian footballer

Personal information
- Full name: Sergei Faritovich Zangareev
- Date of birth: October 3, 1980 (age 46)
- Place of birth: Soviet Union
- Height: 1.78 m (5 ft 10 in)
- Position: Centre midfielder

Senior career*
Years	Team	Apps	(Gls)
1998–1999	FC Zhemchuzhina-2 Sochi	61	(4)
2000–2003	FK Ventspils	79	(13)
2004	FC Lisma-Mordovia Saransk	32	(2)
2005	FC Lada Togliatti	23	(1)
2006–2008	FK Ventspils	39	(6)
2009	FC Mashuk-KMV Pyatigorsk	33	(7)
2010–2012	FC Torpedo Armavir	54	(6)
2012–2013	FC Gornyak Uchaly	20	(2)
2013–2014	FC Biolog-Novokubansk Progress	12	(3)
- * Club domestic league appearances and goals

Sergei Faritovich Zangareev (Russian: Серге́й Фаритович Зангареев; born 3 October 1980) is a former football midfielder from Russia.

Zangareev previously played for Lisma-Mordoviya Saransk in the Russian Football National League and FC Lada Togliatti in the Russian Second Division.

== Playing career ==
2003	FK Ventspils	Virsliga 1st level	*
2004	Zhemchuzhina Sochi
2005	Lisma-Mordoviya Saransk
2006	FK Ventspils	Virsliga 1st level	21/2
2007	FK Ventspils	Virsliga 1st level	2/0

* - played games and goals

== Awards ==
- Champion of Latvia - 2006
