= Nechay =

Nechay is a surname derived from the nickname produced with the negation particle "ne" and component 'chay' (to await). Notable people with the surname include:

- Danylo Nechay (1612–1651), Ukrainian military commander
- Mykhailo Nechay (1930–2011), Ukrainian molfar
- Sergei Nechay (born 1968), Russian football official and player

== See also ==
- Nechayev
