= Artur Karpov =

Russian footballer

Personal information
- Full name: Artur Rashidovich Karpov
- Date of birth: 31 July 2001 (age 25)
- Place of birth: Astrakhan, Russia
- Height: 1.75 m (5 ft 9 in)
- Position: Midfielder

Team information
- Current team: SC Astrakhan
- Number: 77

Youth career
- –2018: FC Volgar Astrakhan

Senior career*
Years	Team	Apps	(Gls)
2018–2024	FC Volgar Astrakhan	8	(0)
2022–2023	→ FC Kaluga (loan)	27	(0)
2023–2024	→ SC Astrakhan (loan)	15	(0)
2024–	SC Astrakhan	63	(2)
- * Club domestic league appearances and goals as of 31 October 2026

Artur Rashidovich Karpov (Russian: Артур Рашидович Карпов; born 31 July 2001) is a Russian football player who plays for SC Astrakhan.

== Club career ==
He made his debut in the Russian Football National League for FC Volgar Astrakhan on 21 August 2021 in a game against FC Torpedo Moscow.
