= Vasili Fiyev =

Russian footballer

Personal information
- Full name: Vasili Ivanovich Fiyev
- Date of birth: 7 May 1982 (age 44)
- Height: 1.70 m (5 ft 7 in)
- Positions: Midfielder; defender

Youth career
- DYuSSh Aleksandrovskoye
- Kolosok Aleksandrovskoye
- Kosmos Stavropol
- FC Dynamo Stavropol

Senior career*
Years	Team	Apps	(Gls)
1999	FC Interros Stavropol		
2000–2003	FC Dynamo Stavropol	114	(7)
2003	FC Baltika Kaliningrad	17	(2)
2004	FC Dynamo Stavropol	26	(1)
2005	FC Dynamo Stavropol (amateur)		
2005	FC Chernomorets Novorossiysk (amateur)		
2006	FC Chernomorets Novorossiysk	6	(0)
2007	FC Dynamo Stavropol	9	(0)
2009	FC Zhemchuzhina-Sochi	16	(1)
2011–2012	FC Kolos-Kalininskoye Pokoynoye		
2012–2013	FC Biolog-Novokubansk	10	(0)
2014	FC Embros Grecheskoye		
- * Club domestic league appearances and goals

Vasili Ivanovich Fiyev (Russian: Василий Иванович Фиев; born 7 May 1982) is a former Russian professional football player.

== Club career ==
He played in the Russian Football National League for FC Baltika Kaliningrad in 2003.

== Personal life ==
He is a twin brother of Nikolai Fiyev.
