= Kosenkov =

Kosenkov (Russian: Косенков) is a Russian masculine surname, its feminine counterpart is Kosenkova. It may refer to

- Aleksandr Kosenkov (born 1956), Belarusian diver
- Alexander Kosenkow (born 1977), German sprinter of Russian descent
- Yuliya Kosenkova (born 1973), Russian middle-distance runner

== See also ==
- Kosenko
