= Stepan Ryabokon =

Russian footballer

Personal information
- Full name: Stepan Aleksandrovich Ryabokon
- Date of birth: 22 April 1993 (age 33)
- Place of birth: Rostovanovskoye, Russia
- Height: 1.89 m (6 ft 2 1/2 in)
- Position: Defender

Senior career*
Years	Team	Apps	(Gls)
2009	FC Volgograd	0	(0)
2010	FC Rotor Volgograd	2	(0)
2011	PFC CSKA Moscow	0	(0)
2011–2015	FC Rotor Volgograd	29	(0)
2012–2013	→ FC Energiya Volzhsky (loan)	24	(0)
2013–2014	→ FC Olimpia Volgograd (loan)	22	(3)
2015–2016	FC SKA Rostov-on-Don	19	(0)
2016–2018	FC SKA Rostov-on-Don	47	(1)

International career
2011	Russia U-18	7	(1)
2012	Russia U-19	2	(0)
- * Club domestic league appearances and goals

Stepan Aleksandrovich Ryabokon (Russian: Степан Александрович Рябоконь; born 22 April 1993) is a Russian former professional football player.

== Club career ==
He made his Russian Football National League debut for FC Rotor Volgograd on 3 November 2010 in a game against FC Kuban Krasnodar.
