= Viktor Borisov =

Russian professional footballer

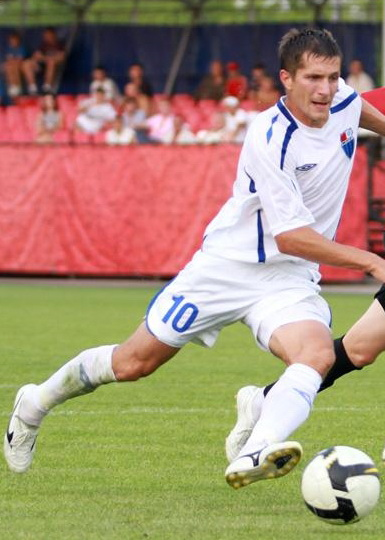

Personal information
- Full name: Viktor Yuryevich Borisov
- Date of birth: 12 April 1985 (age 41)
- Place of birth: Gumrak, Russian SFSR
- Height: 1.82 m (6 ft 0 in)
- Positions: Forward; midfielder

Senior career*
Years	Team	Apps	(Gls)
2001–2004	FC Rotor Volgograd	0	(0)
2005	FC Rotor-2 Volgograd	16	(7)
2006	FC Tom Tomsk	1	(0)
2007	FC Baltika Kaliningrad	19	(0)
2008	FC Salyut-Energia Belgorod	12	(1)
2008	FC Gubkin	17	(4)
2009	FC Mordovia Saransk	29	(10)
2010–2012	FC Rotor Volgograd	55	(11)
2012–2013	FC Sever Murmansk	20	(6)
2013–2014	FC Olimpia Volgograd	24	(13)
2014–2015	FC Zenit-Izhevsk Izhevsk	17	(4)
2015	FC Karelia Petrozavodsk	2	(2)
2016–2017	FC Rotor Volgograd	16	(1)
2017	FC Rotor-2 Volgograd	5	(0)
- * Club domestic league appearances and goals

Viktor Yuryevich Borisov (Russian: Виктор Юрьевич Борисов; born 12 April 1985) is a Russian former professional footballer.

== Club career ==
He made his debut in the Russian Premier League in 2006 for FC Tom Tomsk.
