= Igumenov =

Igumenov (feminine: Igumenova) is a Russian surname derived from igumen, "hegumen". Notable people with the surname include:

- Svetlana Igumenova (born 1988), Russian taekwondo practitioner
- Viktor Igumenov (born 1943), Russian wrestler

== See also ==
- Igumnov
