= Valeri Basiyev =

Russian professional football player

Personal information
- Full name: Valeri Astemirovich Basiyev
- Date of birth: 2 June 1985 (age 41)
- Height: 1.82 m (6 ft 0 in)
- Position: Forward

Youth career
- Yunost Vladikavkaz

Senior career*
| Years | Team | Apps | (Gls) |
| 2004 | FC Mozdok (amateur) | | |
| 2005 | FC Alania Oktyabrskoye | | |
| 2005–2006 | FC Vladikavkaz (amateur) | | |
| 2006–2009 | FC Kavkaztransgaz-2005 Ryzdvyany | 104 | (25) |
| 2010 | FC Sheksna Cherepovets | 14 | (2) |
| 2010 | FC Dynamo Stavropol | 10 | (4) |
| 2011–2012 | FC Olimpia Gelendzhik | 30 | (15) |
| 2012 | FC SKA-Energiya Khabarovsk | 5 | (0) |
| 2013 | FC Vityaz Podolsk | 11 | (2) |
| 2013 | FC Biolog-Novokubansk Progress | 15 | (2) |
| 2014 | FC SKVO Rostov-on-Don | 8 | (2) |
| 2014 | FC TSK Simferopol | 17 | (5) |
| 2015 | FC Anapa (amateur) | | |
| 2016 | FC TSK Simferopol | 8 | (0) |
| 2016 | FC Belogorsk | | |
| 2016 | FC Kuban Holding Pavlovskaya | | |
| 2016–2018 | FC Omega Kurganinsk | | |
- * Club domestic league appearances and goals

Valeri Astemirovich Basiyev (Russian: Валерий Астемирович Басиев; born 2 June 1985) is a Russian former professional football player.

== Club career ==
He played in the Russian Football National League for FC SKA-Energiya Khabarovsk in 2012.
