= Nikolai Fiyev =

Russian footballer

Personal information
- Full name: Nikolai Ivanovich Fiyev
- Date of birth: 7 May 1982 (age 44)
- Height: 1.69 m (5 ft 6 1/2 in)
- Position: Midfielder

Youth career
- DYuSSh Aleksandrovskoye
- Kolosok Aleksandrovskoye
- Kosmos Stavropol
- FC Dynamo Stavropol

Senior career*
Years	Team	Apps	(Gls)
2000	FC Interros Stavropol		
2000–2004	FC Dynamo Stavropol	126	(10)
2005	FC Dynamo Stavropol (amateur)		
2005	FC Chernomorets Novorossiysk (amateur)		
2006	FC Chernomorets Novorossiysk	25	(2)
2007	FC Dynamo Stavropol	10	(1)
2007	FC Lokomotiv-KMV Mineralnye Vody (amateur)		
2007–2008	FC Mashuk-KMV Pyatigorsk	46	(2)
2009–2010	FC Zhemchuzhina-Sochi	61	(6)
2011–2012	FC Rotor Volgograd	28	(0)
2012–2013	FC Biolog-Novokubansk	28	(3)
2014	FC Embros Grecheskoye		
- * Club domestic league appearances and goals

Nikolai Ivanovich Fiyev (Russian: Николай Иванович Фиев; born 7 May 1982) is a former Russian professional football player.

== Club career ==
He played three seasons in the Russian Football National League for FC Mashuk-KMV Pyatigorsk and FC Zhemchuzhina-Sochi.

== Personal life ==
He is the twin brother of Vasili Fiyev.
