= Vladimir Kuleshov =

Russian footballer

Personal information
- Full name: Vladimir Aleksandrovich Kuleshov
- Date of birth: 18 May 1986 (age 40)
- Place of birth: Frunze, Kyrgyz SSR
- Height: 1.85 m (6 ft 1 in)
- Positions: Forward; left midfielder; left back

Youth career
- Spartak Moscow

Senior career*
Years	Team	Apps	(Gls)
2004–2005	Shinnik Yaroslavl	0	(0)
2006	Spartak Lukhovitsy	9	(0)
2007–2009	Dinaburg	78	(4)
2010–2012	Gazovik Orenburg	68	(13)
2012–2013	Khimki	15	(2)
2013–2015	Tyumen	49	(3)
2015	Baikal Irkutsk	5	(0)
2016	Rubin Yalta	11	(1)
2016	Volga Tver	4	(0)
- * Club domestic league appearances and goals as of 10 September 2016

Vladimir Aleksandrovich Kuleshov (Russian: Владимир Александрович Кулешов; born 18 May 1986) is a former Russian footballer.

== Club career ==
He played 4 seasons in the Russian Football National League for 4 different clubs.
