= Denis Arlashin =

Russian professional football player

Personal information
- Full name: Denis Alekseyevich Arlashin
- Date of birth: 21 February 1990 (age 36)
- Place of birth: Vyazma, Smolensk Oblast, Russian SFSR
- Height: 1.74 m (5 ft 9 in)
- Positions: Forward; midfielder

Senior career*
| Years | Team | Apps | (Gls) |
| 2006 | FC Teplokontrol-Status Safonovo | | |
| 2007–2008 | SC Smolensk | | |
| 2008 | FC Dnepr Smolensk (amateur) | | |
| 2009 | FC Dnepr Smolensk | 23 | (1) |
| 2010 | FC Volochanin-Ratmir Vyshny Volochyok | 12 | (1) |
| 2010 | FC Volga Tver | 8 | (0) |
| 2011 | FC Dnepr Smolensk | 34 | (5) |
| 2012–2013 | FC Rotor Volgograd | 31 | (2) |
| 2013–2014 | FC Zenit Penza | 19 | (1) |
| 2014–2015 | FC Neftekhimik Nizhnekamsk | 24 | (7) |
| 2015–2016 | FC KAMAZ Naberezhnye Chelny | 14 | (0) |
| 2016–2017 | FC SKA Rostov-on-Don | 39 | (2) |
| 2018 | FC Iskra Smolensk (amateur) | | |
- * Club domestic league appearances and goals

Denis Alekseyevich Arlashin (Russian: Денис Алексеевич Арлашин; born 21 February 1990) is a Russian former professional football player.

== Club career ==
He made his Russian Football National League debut for FC Rotor Volgograd on 9 July 2012 in a game against FC Tom Tomsk. He also played in the FNL for KAMAZ in the 2015–16 season.

== Personal life ==
He is a twin brother of Andrei Arlashin.
