= Maksim Ionov =

Russian footballer

Personal information
- Full name: Maksim Viktorovich Ionov
- Date of birth: 5 September 1976 (age 50)
- Height: 1.80 m (5 ft 11 in)
- Position: Midfielder

Senior career*
Years	Team	Apps	(Gls)
1996	FC Zvezda Gorodishche	26	(2)
1997–2005	FC Torpedo Volzhsky	240	(16)
2008–2010	FC Energiya Volzhsky	73	(7)
- * Club domestic league appearances and goals

Maksim Viktorovich Ionov (Russian: Максим Викторович Ионов; born 5 September 1976) is a former Russian professional football player.

== Club career ==
He played in the Russian Football National League for FC Torpedo Volzhsky in 1997.
