= Aleksandr Ionov =

Russian footballer

Personal information
- Full name: Aleksandr Vladimirovich Ionov
- Date of birth: 29 March 1983 (age 43)
- Place of birth: Shatura, Moscow Oblast, Russian SFSR
- Height: 1.79 m (5 ft 10 1/2 in)
- Position: Midfielder

Senior career*
Years	Team	Apps	(Gls)
2000	FC Lokomotiv-2 Moscow	17	(1)
2001–2003	FC Lokomotiv Moscow	0	(0)
2003	FC Volgar-Gazprom Astrakhan	6	(1)
2004	FC Sokol Saratov	32	(3)
2005	FC Metallurg Lipetsk	13	(0)
2006	FC KAMAZ Naberezhnye Chelny	19	(0)
2007	FC KAMAZ-2 Naberezhnye Chelny		
2008–2010	FC Sokol Saratov	74	(3)
2011	FC Ufa	0	(0)
2012	FC Zenit Penza	1	(0)

International career
2004–2005	Russia U21	4	(0)
- * Club domestic league appearances and goals

Aleksandr Vladimirovich Ionov (Russian: Александр Владимирович Ионов; born 29 March 1983) is a Russian former professional football player.

== Club career ==
He made his debut for FC Lokomotiv Moscow on 29 November 2002 in a Russian Cup game against FC Dynamo Makhachkala. In 2003 he appeared twice for Lokomotiv in the Russian Premier League Cup.

He played 4 seasons in the Russian Football National League for 4 different clubs.

== Personal life ==
He is an identical twin brother of forward Konstantin Ionov.
