= Sergei Volosyan =

Russian footballer

Personal information
- Full name: Sergei Vladimirovich Volosyan
- Date of birth: 6 April 1989 (age 37)
- Place of birth: Tolyatti, Kuybyshev Oblast, Russian SFSR
- Height: 1.78 m (5 ft 10 in)
- Positions: Defender; midfielder

Senior career*
Years	Team	Apps	(Gls)
2007–2008	FC Lada-2 Togliatti (amateur)		
2008–2009	FC Lada Togliatti	42	(6)
2010–2012	FC Tyumen	49	(2)
2012–2013	FC Lada-Togliatti	19	(0)
2013–2014	FC Zenit-Izhevsk	25	(1)
2014–2016	FC KAMAZ Naberezhnye Chelny	44	(1)
2016	FC Sakhalin Yuzhno-Sakhalinsk	9	(0)
2017–2018	FC Torpedo Vladimir	35	(0)
2018–2019	FC Syzran-2003	22	(0)
2019–2020	FC Lada Dimitrovgrad	15	(0)
- * Club domestic league appearances and goals

Sergei Vladimirovich Volosyan (Russian: Серге́й Владимирович Волосян; born 6 April 1989) is a Russian former professional football player.

== Club career ==
He made his Russian Football National League debut for FC KAMAZ Naberezhnye Chelny on 20 July 2015 in a game against FC Volgar Astrakhan.
