= Sergei Shumilin =

Russian footballer

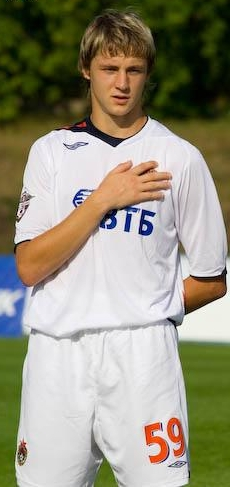
- Sergei Shumilin (2007)

Personal information
- Full name: Sergei Ivanovich Shumilin
- Date of birth: 21 February 1990 (age 36)
- Place of birth: Mozhaysk, Russian SFSR
- Height: 1.82 m (6 ft 0 in)
- Position: Forward

Youth career
- PFC CSKA Moscow

Senior career*
Years	Team	Apps	(Gls)
2007–2010	PFC CSKA Moscow	0	(0)
2009	→ FC Sibir Novosibirsk (loan)	14	(0)
2010–2011	FK Ventspils	13	(3)
2010–2011	→ FC Kryvbas Kryvyi Rih (loan)	1	(0)
2011	FC Dynamo Barnaul	14	(4)
2012–2013	FC Rotor Volgograd	18	(2)
2013	FC Lokomotiv-2 Moscow	8	(0)
2014–2015	FC Chayka Peschanokopskoye (amateur)		
2016	FC Mika	10	(2)
2017	FC SKA Rostov-on-Don	28	(9)
2018	FC Tyumen	5	(0)

International career
2007	Russia U-17	6	(4)
2008–2009	Russia U-19	8	(3)
- * Club domestic league appearances and goals

Sergei Ivanovich Shumilin (Серге́й Иванович Шумилин; born 21 February 1990) is a Russian former professional football player.

== Career ==
Shumilin began his career with PFC CSKA Moscow and joined FC Sibir Novosibirsk on loan in January 2009, after his return to CSKA. In December 2009 he played his senior debut in the Commonwealth of Independent States Cup.

In April 2010 he joined the Latvian Virsliga club FK Ventspils. In September 2010 he was loaned out to FC Kryvbas Kryvyi Rih, but in February 2011 he returned to FK Ventspils. In March he was released.

== International career ==
He was a member of the Russia U-19 national team and earned his debut on 17 October 2008 in the qualification to the UEFA European Under-19 Championship
