= Aleksandr Abroskin =

Russian footballer

Personal information
- Full name: Aleksandr Aleksandrovich Abroskin
- Date of birth: 23 April 1987 (age 39)
- Place of birth: Rostov-on-Don, Russian SFSR
- Height: 1.77 m (5 ft 9 1/2 in)
- Position: Forward

Senior career*
Years	Team	Apps	(Gls)
2007	FC Nika Krasny Sulin (amateur)		
2008	FC Nika Krasny Sulin	30	(9)
2009	FC Bataysk-2007	32	(6)
2010–2013	FC Fakel Voronezh	73	(11)
2013	FC Khimki	14	(2)
2014–2015	FC Zenit Penza	35	(5)
2016	FC SKA Rostov-on-Don	25	(3)
2017	FC Chayka Peschanokopskoye	6	(0)

Managerial career
- 2017–2022: FC Rostov (academy)
- 2022–2023: FC Rostov (U19)
- 2024–2025: FC Rostov-2
- 2026: FC Akron Tolyatti (assistant)
- * Club domestic league appearances and goals

Aleksandr Aleksandrovich Abroskin (Russian: Александр Александрович Аброскин; born 23 April 1987) is a Russian football coach and a former striker.

== Club career ==
He made his Russian Football National League debut for FC Fakel Voronezh on 7 April 2011 in a game against FC Shinnik Yaroslavl.
