= Sergei Rashevsky =

Russian footballer

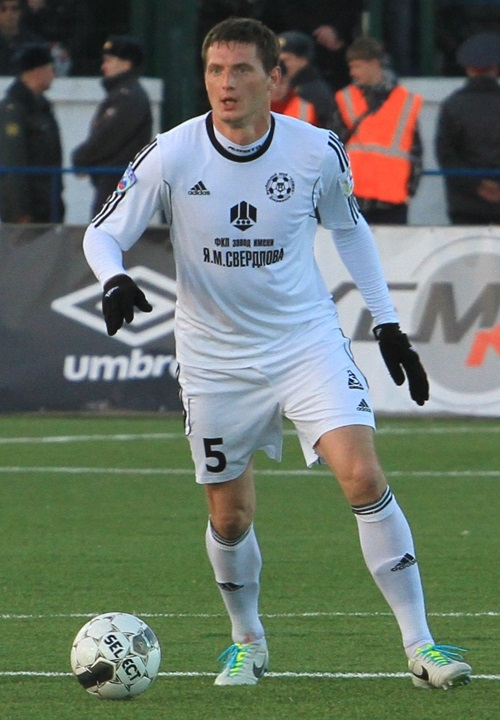

Personal information
- Full name: Sergei Aleksandrovich Rashevsky
- Date of birth: 13 June 1980 (age 46)
- Place of birth: Volgograd, Russian SFSR
- Height: 1.88 m (6 ft 2 in)
- Position: Midfielder

Team information
- Current team: FC Rotor Volgograd (assistant coach)

Senior career*
Years	Team	Apps	(Gls)
1997–2000	Rotor-2 Volgograd	71	(2)
2001–2004	Rotor Volgograd	47	(0)
2005	Ural Sverdlovsk Oblast	17	(0)
2006	Zvezda Irkutsk	10	(0)
2006	Sodovik Sterlitamak	19	(2)
2007	Baltika Kaliningrad	36	(2)
2008–2010	Volga Nizhny Novgorod	94	(7)
2011	Ural Sverdlovsk Oblast	12	(0)
2012–2013	Rotor Volgograd	10	(0)
2013	Luch-Energiya Vladivostok	6	(0)
2013	Khimik Dzerzhinsk	15	(2)
2014	Yenisey Krasnoyarsk	8	(1)
2014	Tambov	5	(0)
2014	TSK Simferopol		

Managerial career
- 2019–: FC Rotor Volgograd (assistant)
- * Club domestic league appearances and goals

Sergei Aleksandrovich Rashevsky (Russian: Сергей Александрович Рашевский; born 13 June 1980) is a Russian football coach and a former player. He is an assistant coach with FC Rotor Volgograd.

== Club career ==
He made his debut in the Russian Premier League in 2001 for FC Rotor Volgograd, before moving to Ural in 2005. After several seasons playing for different clubs in Russia, Rashevsky signed with Volga in 2008. He played for the club for three years, before he returned to Ural in 2011.

Since February 2014, he played for the Russian National Football League side Yenisey Krasnoyarsk.
