= Yuri Rodenkov =

Russian footballer

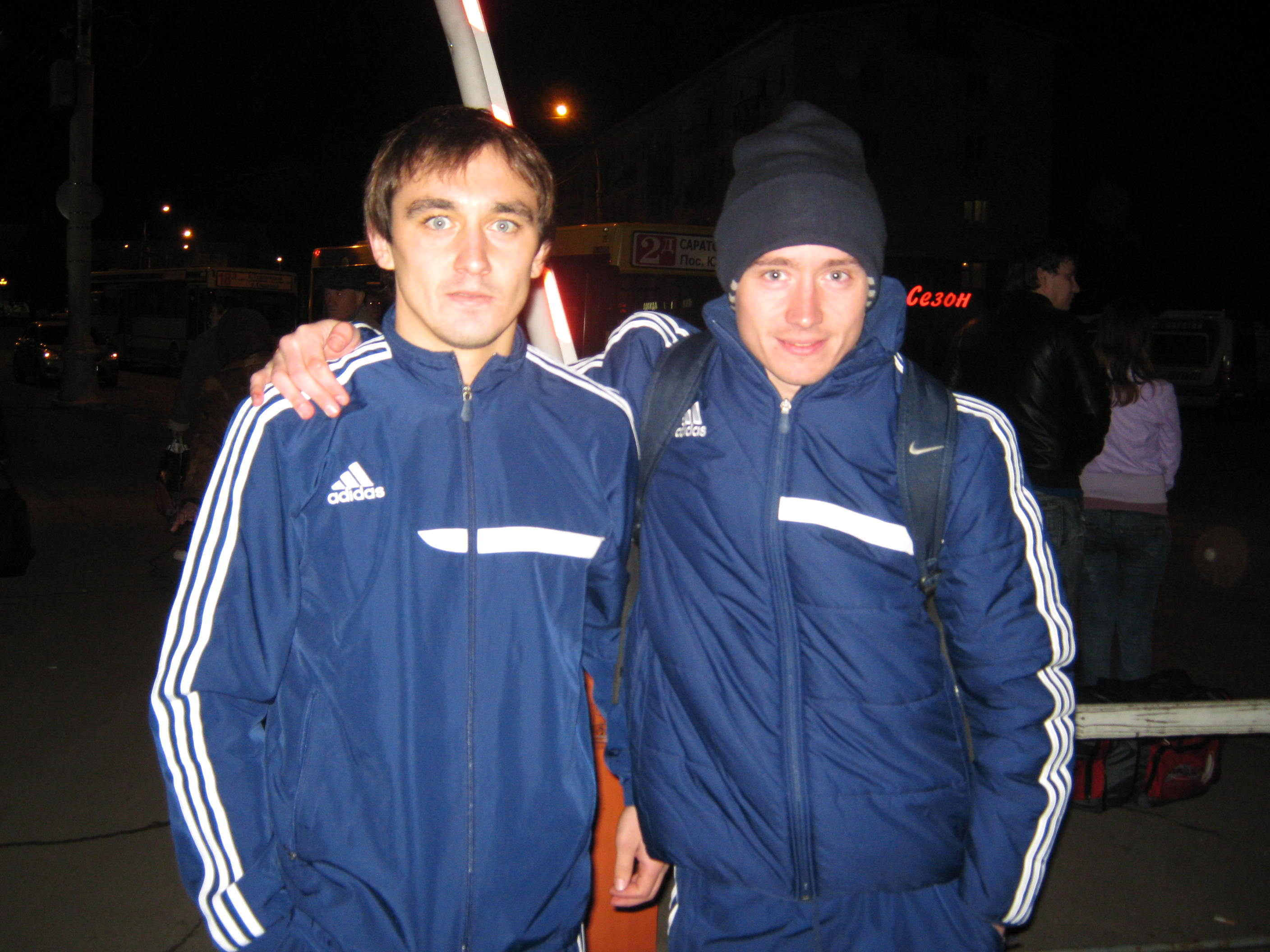

Personal information
- Full name: Yuri Andreyevich Rodenkov
- Date of birth: 20 April 1986 (age 40)
- Place of birth: Leningrad, Soviet Union
- Height: 1.77 m (5 ft 10 in)
- Position: Forward

Senior career*
Years	Team	Apps	(Gls)
2004	FC Zenit-2 St. Petersburg	29	(2)
2005–2008	FC Zenit St. Petersburg	0	(0)
2007	→ PFC Spartak Nalchik (loan)	25	(2)
2008	→ FC Alania Vladikavkaz (loan)	20	(2)
2009	FC Luch-Energiya Vladivostok	36	(6)
2010	FC Salyut Belgorod	37	(4)
2011–2012	FC Baltika Kaliningrad	38	(1)
2012–2013	FC Yenisey Krasnoyarsk	19	(0)
2013–2014	FC Sokol Saratov	27	(3)
2014	FC Zenit Penza	17	(0)

International career
2007	Russia U-21	5	(0)
- * Club domestic league appearances and goals

Yuri Andreyevich Rodenkov (Russian: Юрий Андреевич Роденков; born 20 April 1986) is a former Russian professional footballer.

== Club career ==
He made his debut in the Russian Premier League in 2007 while playing for PFC Spartak Nalchik.
