= Anna Nechaeva =

Russian soprano singer (born 1976)

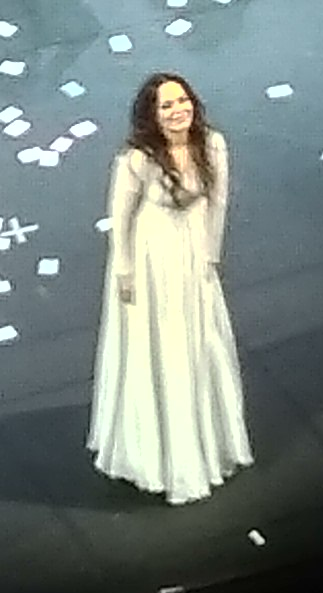
Anna Nechaeva, 2019

Anna Vladimirovna Nechaeva (Russian: Анна Владимировна Нечаева; born in 1976) is a Russian soprano who was born in Saratov and used attend its Conservatory in 1996. Later she was offered to perform the role of Tatiana in Eugene Onegin at the Saint Petersburg Conservatory and by 2003 became a soloist at the Saint Petersburg Opera where she continued her original role as well as other title roles in Giacomo Puccini's Gianni Schicchi, Madama Butterfly, and Suor Angelica. From 2008 to 2011 she became a soloist at the Mikhaylovsky Theatre where she performed roles of Nedda in Pagliacci and Rachel in The Jews as well as the title roles of Rusalka and of course Tatiana in Eugene Onegin. In 2012, she made her first public appearance with Bolshoi Theatre where she sang in The Enchantress portraying Nastasya becoming soloist there the same year. After her debut, she performed such roles as Iolanta in an opera of the same name as well as Liu in Turandot and Yaroslavna in Prince Igor.
