= Yunost Stadium (Armavir) =

Sports venue in Armavir, Russia

- Interactive map of Yunost Stadium (Armavir)
- Location: Armavir, Krasnodar Krai, Russia
- Coordinates: 44°59′45.4″N 41°6′59.5″E
- Capacity: 5,700

Tenant
- FC Armavir

Yunost Stadium (Russian: Юность) is a multi-use stadium in Armavir, Russia. It is currently used mostly for football matches and is the home ground of FC Armavir. The stadium holds 5,000 people.
