= Ivan Gerasimov (footballer) =

Russian footballer

Personal information
- Full name: Ivan Aleksandrovich Gerasimov
- Date of birth: 11 January 1985 (age 41)
- Place of birth: Grozny, Russian SFSR, USSR
- Height: 1.81 m (5 ft 11 1/2 in)
- Position: Striker

Youth career
- FC Olimpia Volgograd

Senior career*
Years	Team	Apps	(Gls)
2003–2008	FC Olimpia Volgograd	173	(48)
2009	FC Krasnodar	7	(0)
2009	FC Volgograd	13	(2)
2010	FC Torpedo-ZIL Moscow	25	(3)
2011–2012	FC Rotor Volgograd	27	(7)
2013	FC Olimpia Volgograd	8	(3)
2013	FC Astrakhan	3	(0)
2014	FC GTS Ryzdvyany	11	(1)
2014–2015	FC Rotor Volgograd	20	(3)
2016–2017	FC BIO Svetly Yar		
- * Club domestic league appearances and goals

Ivan Aleksandrovich Gerasimov (Russian: Иван Александрович Герасимов; born 11 January 1985) is a former Russian professional football player.

== Club career ==
He played in the Russian Football National League for FC Krasnodar in 2009.
