= Mikhail Mullyar =

Russian footballer

Personal information
- Full name: Mikhail Viktorovich Mullyar
- Date of birth: 5 March 1989 (age 37)
- Height: 1.86 m (6 ft 1 in)
- Position: Defender

Senior career*
Years	Team	Apps	(Gls)
2007	FC Lokomotiv-KMV Mineralnye Vody (amateur)		
2008–2015	FC Mashuk-KMV Pyatigorsk	148	(6)
2015	FC Afips Afipsky	7	(0)
2016–2020	FC Mashuk-KMV Pyatigorsk	72	(3)
- * Club domestic league appearances and goals

Mikhail Viktorovich Mullyar (Russian: Михаил Викторович Мулляр; born 5 March 1989) is a Russian former professional football player.

== Club career ==
He made his Russian Football National League debut for FC Mashuk-KMV Pyatigorsk on 19 April 2008 in a game against FC Alania Vladikavkaz.
