= Pavel Garannikov =

Russian footballer

Personal information
- Full name: Pavel Sergeyevich Garannikov
- Date of birth: 23 August 1985 (age 41)
- Height: 1.80 m (5 ft 11 in)
- Positions: Forward; midfielder

Youth career
- FC Lokomotiv Chita
- DYuSSh Izobilny

Senior career*
Years	Team	Apps	(Gls)
2002	FC Volgar-Gazprom-2 Astrakhan	23	(0)
2003	FC Dynamo Petushki		
2004–2005	FC Torpedo Moscow	0	(0)
2005–2013	FC Chita	133	(26)
2013–2014	FC Baikal Irkutsk	15	(1)
- * Club domestic league appearances and goals

Pavel Sergeyevich Garannikov (Russian: Павел Серге́евич Гаранников; born 23 August 1985) is a former Russian professional football player.

== Club career ==
He played in the Russian Football National League for FC Chita in 2009.
