= Artyom Mitasov =

Russian footballer

Personal information
- Full name: Artyom Aleksandrovich Mitasov
- Date of birth: 12 March 1990 (age 36)
- Place of birth: Kursk, Russian SFSR
- Height: 1.82 m (6 ft 0 in)
- Position: Winger

Youth career
- 2007–2009: Avangard Kursk

Senior career*
| Years | Team | Apps | (Gls) |
| 2009 | Avangard Kursk | 2 | (0) |
| 2010 | Rubin-2 Kazan | 25 | (1) |
| 2011–2015 | Avangard Kursk | 82 | (8) |
| 2015–2017 | Shinnik Yaroslavl | 46 | (3) |
| 2017–2018 | Avangard Kursk | 22 | (2) |
| 2018 | Fakel Voronezh | 14 | (0) |
| 2019 | Gorodeya | 21 | (1) |
| 2020–2021 | Avangard Kursk | 22 | (1) |
- * Club domestic league appearances and goals

Artyom Aleksandrovich Mitasov (Russian: Артём Александрович Митасов; born 12 March 1990) is a Russian former professional football player.

== Club career ==
He made his Russian Football National League debut for FC Shinnik Yaroslavl on 11 July 2015 in a game against FC Baltika Kaliningrad.
