= Oleg Aleynik =

Russian professional football player

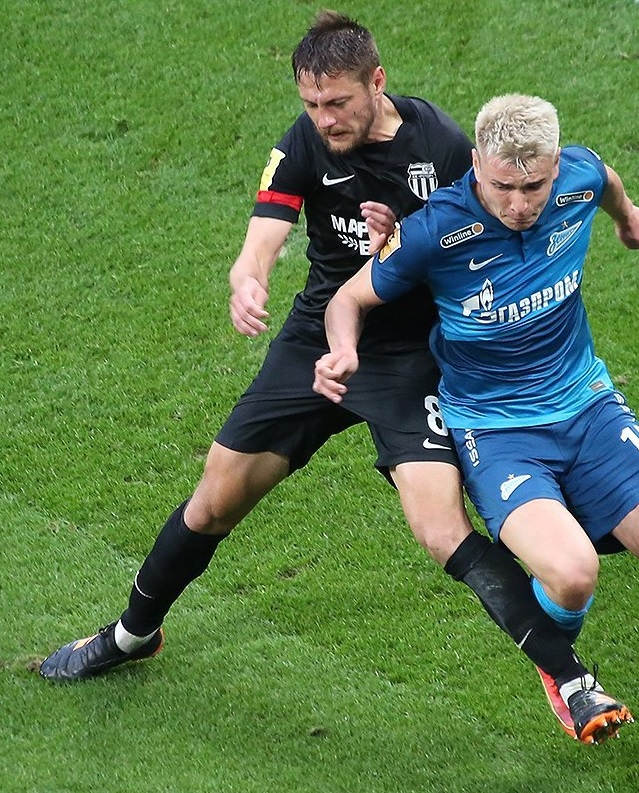
- Aleynik (left) with Rotor Volgograd in 2021

Personal information
- Full name: Oleg Igorevich Aleynik
- Date of birth: 8 February 1989 (age 37)
- Place of birth: Gukovo, Rostov Oblast, Russian SFSR
- Height: 1.81 m (5 ft 11 in)
- Position: Midfielder

Youth career
- UOR Volgograd

Senior career*
Years	Team	Apps	(Gls)
2006–2007	FC Rostov	0	(0)
2008–2010	FC Moscow	0	(0)
2009	→ FC Metallurg Lipetsk (loan)	12	(0)
2010	→ FC Rotor Volgograd (loan)	21	(1)
2011	FC Ural Sverdlovsk Oblast	0	(0)
2011–2013	FC Rotor Volgograd	26	(2)
2013	FC Olimpia Volgograd	19	(9)
2014–2016	FC Volgar Astrakhan	67	(15)
2016–2018	FC Kuban Krasnodar	57	(7)
2018–2019	FC SKA-Khabarovsk	30	(2)
2019–2021	FC Rotor Volgograd	45	(2)
2021	FC Chayka Peschanokopskoye	0	(0)
2021–2022	FC Baltika Kaliningrad	12	(1)
2022–2023	FC Rotor Volgograd	8	(0)
2023	FC Kyzyltash Bakhchisaray (amateur)		

Managerial career
- 2026: Shakhtyor Donetsk (assistant)
- 2026: Shakhtyor Donetsk (caretaker)
- 2026: Shakhtyor Donetsk (assistant)
- * Club domestic league appearances and goals

Oleg Igorevich Aleynik (Russian: Олег Игоревич Алейник; born 8 February 1989) is a Russian professional football coach and a former player.

== Club career ==
He made his Russian Football National League debut for FC Metallurg Lipetsk on 17 August 2009 in a game against FC Sibir Novosibirsk.

He made his Russian Premier League debut for FC Rotor Volgograd on 11 August 2020 in a game against FC Zenit Saint Petersburg.
