= FC FAYUR Beslan =

Russian football club

- Full name: Профессиональный футбольный клуб Беслан-Фаюр (Professional Football Club Central Sports Club of Fayur Beslan)
- Founded: 2010
- Dissolved: 2012
- Ground: Tedeyev SOK Stadium
- Chairman: Andrey Perederiy
- League: Russian Second Division; Zone South
- 2011–12: 11th

PFK FAYUR Beslan (Russian: ФК ФАЮР Беслан) was a Russian football club from Beslan, founded in 2010. It played in the Russian Second Division in 2010 and 2011/12 seasons, taking 6th spot in the South Zone in 2010.

In 2010 it played under the name FC Beslan-FAYUR Beslan.
