= Dmitry Kosenko =

Russian footballer

Personal information
- Full name: Dmitry Sergeyevich Kosenko
- Date of birth: 21 October 1986 (age 40)
- Place of birth: Rostov-on-Don, Russian SFSR
- Height: 1.82 m (5 ft 11 1/2 in)
- Positions: Defender; midfielder

Youth career
- FC Rostov

Senior career*
Years	Team	Apps	(Gls)
2004–2006	FC Rostov	0	(0)
2007–2008	FC Bataysk-2007	61	(1)
2009–2010	FC Metallurg Lipetsk	57	(5)
2011	FC Rotor Volgograd	9	(0)
2011–2013	FC Metallurg Lipetsk	32	(1)
- * Club domestic league appearances and goals

Dmitry Sergeyevich Kosenko (Russian: Дми́трий Серге́евич Косе́нко; born 21 October 1986) is a former Russian professional association football player.

== Club career ==
He played made his debut for FC Rostov on 13 July 2005 in a Russian Cup game against FC Luch-Energiya Vladivostok.

He played in the Russian Football National League for FC Metallurg Lipetsk in 2009.
