= FC Olimpia Gelendzhik =

Russian football club

- Full name: Football club Olimpia Gelendzhik
- Founded: 2011
- Ground: Olimp Stadium
- Chairman: Sergei Klyuyev
- Manager: Lev Mayorov
- League: Russian Second Division, Zone South
- 2011–12: 14th

FC Olimpia Gelendzhik (Russian: «ФК Олимпия» Геленджик) is a Russian football team from Gelendzhik, founded in 2011. It played in the Russian Second Division in the 2011/12 season, taking 14th place in Zone South. It withdrew from the professional competitions after the season.
