= Aleksandr Nechayev (footballer, born 1987) =

Russian footballer

Personal information
- Full name: Aleksandr Vladimirovich Nechayev
- Date of birth: 19 January 1987 (age 39)
- Place of birth: Kurgan, Russian SFSR
- Height: 1.78 m (5 ft 10 in)
- Positions: Midfielder; forward

Senior career*
Years	Team	Apps	(Gls)
2004–2005	FC Tobol Kurgan	62	(1)
2006	FC Rostov	0	(0)
2006	FC Taganrog	12	(0)
2007	FC Sodovik Sterlitamak	25	(2)
2008	FC Taganrog	14	(5)
2008	FC Krasnodar	18	(4)
2009–2011	FC SKA-Energiya Khabarovsk	85	(3)
2012–2013	FC Rotor Volgograd	29	(3)
2014	FC Olimpia Volgograd	0	(0)
2016–2018	FC Nosta Novotroitsk	43	(13)
- * Club domestic league appearances and goals

Aleksandr Vladimirovich Nechayev (Russian: Александр Владимирович Нечаев; born 19 January 1987) is a former professional Russian football player.

== Club career ==
He played 6 seasons in the Russian Football National League for FC Sodovik Sterlitamak, FC SKA-Energiya Khabarovsk and FC Rotor Volgograd.
