= FC Metallurg-Oskol Stary Oskol =

Russian football club

- Full name: Football Club Metallurg-Oskol Stary Oskol
- Founded: 1997, 2015
- Dissolved: 2014
- Ground: PromAgro Stadium
- Capacity: 11,993
- League: Russian Second Division, Zone Centre
- 2012–13: 14th
Home colours	Away colours

FC Metallurg-Oskol Stary Oskol (Russian: ФК «Металлург-Оскол» Старый Оскол) was a Russian football club from Stary Oskol, founded in 1997. It played in the Russian Second Division. Their first professional season was 2008. The team was called Zodiak Stary Oskol before 2009. During the winter break of the 2013/14 season, the team dropped out of professional competition due to lack of financing.

Old logo
