= FC Slavyansky Slavyansk-na-Kubani =

- Full name: Football Club Slavyansky Slavyansk-na-Kubani
- Nickname(s): The Eagles
- Founded: 2010
- Dissolved: 2013
- Ground: Gorodskoy Stadium
- Chairman: Anatoli Razumeyev
- Manager: Eduard Sarkisov
- League: Russian Second Division, Zone South
- 2012–13: 12th
Home colours	Away colours

FC Slavyansky Slavyansk-na-Kubani (Russian: «ФК Славянский» (Славянск‑на‑Кубани)) was a Russian football team from Slavyansk-na-Kubani. It played professionally in the Russian Second Division in 2011–12 and 2012–13 seasons and then was dissolved due to lack of financing.
