= SC Astrakhan =

- Full name: State Budget Institution of Astrakhan Oblast Sport Club Astrakhan; Russian: Государственное бюджетное учреждение Астраханской области "Спортивный клуб "Астрахань"
- Founded: 1931
- Ground: I.A. Kolosov Stadium
- Capacity: 1,500
- Chairman: Kirill Konstantinov (caretaker)
- Manager: Andranik Babayan
- League: Russian Second League, Division B, Group 1
- 2026: 12th
- Website: https://astrakhan-sc.ru/

SC Astrakhan (Russian: СК Астрахань) is a Russian football club from Astrakhan, founded in 1931.

== Club history ==
The club played in the third-tier Russian Second League from 2000 to 2016. The team was called FC Sudostroitel Astrakhan until 2007 and FC Astrakhan from 2008 to 2016. The club was dissolved in July 2016.

The club was re-established on the amateur levels in 2019 under the new name SC Astrakhan. For the 2023–24 season, it successfully passed licensing to return to the professional level in the Russian Second League.

== Current squad ==
As of 11 September 2026, according to the Second League website.

Note: Flags indicate national team as defined under FIFA eligibility rules; some limited exceptions apply. Players may hold more than one non-FIFA nationality.

No.	Pos.	Nation	Player
3	DF	RUS	Aly Tagiyev
4	MF	RUS	Magomed Pirmagomedov
6	DF	RUS	Bulat Musayev
7	MF	RUS	Mark Polushin
8	MF	RUS	Ivan Kudryashov
9	MF	RUS	Danila Zolotorenko
10	FW	RUS	Pavel Solomatin
11	MF	RUS	Aleksandr Bolonin
14	MF	RUS	Aleksey Pavlov
15	FW	RUS	Danil Sizov
18	DF	RUS	Dmitry Vladimirov
19	FW	RUS	Patcho
21	FW	RUS	Danil Goryayev (on loan from Volgar Astrakhan)
23	MF	RUS	Yelisey Krivokhizhin

No.	Pos.	Nation	Player
25	DF	RUS	Fyodor Galochkin
26	GK	RUS	Valentin Grishin
27	GK	RUS	Sergey Dmitriyev
30	GK	RUS	Fyodor Semyonov
68	MF	RUS	Vsevolod Bogomolov
69	MF	RUS	Maksim Kostyuk
72	MF	RUS	Konstantin Kolesnikov
77	MF	RUS	Artur Karpov
81	FW	RUS	Kirill Pluzhnikov
88	MF	RUS	Vitaly Zhokhov
89	DF	RUS	Danila Prokopyev
94	DF	RUS	Mikhail Slepov
99	MF	RUS	Rasul Zhangurazov
