= FC Armavir (Russia) =

Russian association football club

Armavir
- Full name: Football Club Armavir
- Founded: 1959; 67 years ago
- Dissolved: 2020; 6 years ago
- Ground: Yunost Stadium
- Capacity: 5,700
- Chairman: Marat Oganesyan
- Manager: Aleksei Zhdanov
- League: TBC
- 2019–20: FNL, dropped out
- Website: fcarmavir.ru
Home colours	Away colours

FC Armavir (Russian: Футбольный клуб "Армавир"), formerly FC Torpedo Armavir, is a defunct Russian association football club from Armavir, founded in 1959.

== History ==
Torpedo Armavir was active (mostly in the third-highest level leagues of USSR and Russia) from 1959 to 1969 and from 1990 to 1998, after which it folded. In 2009, the club was re-created and played in the Russian Professional Football League (PFL). It won the third-tier 2014–15 Russian Professional Football League Zone South and was promoted to the second-tier Russian Football National League (FNL), for the 2015–16 Russian Football National League season.

Before starting its 2015–16 FNL season, there were plans for Torpedo to be taken over by the Russian Premier League club FC Kuban Krasnodar and converted to a farm-club as FC Kuban-2 Krasnodar. However, on 9 July 2015, Torpedo was licensed for FNL and Kuban-2 was registered for PFL independently. After one season in the second tier, Torpedo was relegated back to PFL at the end of the 2015–16 season.

On 9 June 2016, the club was renamed FC Armavir.

Armavir returned to the second-tier for the 2018–19 Russian Football National League. On 15 April 2020, shortly after the COVID-19 pandemic shortened 2019–20 Russian Football National League season, Aramvir went bankrupt and folded. Club president Valentin Klimko stated that the club hoped to participate in the third-tier PFL in the 2020–21 season. On 29 June 2020, the club announced that they failed licensing for the PFL as well for the 2020–21 season and were hoping to find the necessary financing to enter local Krasnodar Krai amateur competition for the season.
