= FC Karelia Petrozavodsk =

Russian football club

- Full name: Football Club Karelia Petrozavodsk
- Founded: 2011
- Ground: Spartak Stadium
- Capacity: 14,545
- Owner: Spartak Stadium/Vega-Opt
- Chairman: Vladimir Manylin
- 2015–16: Russian Professional Football League, Zone West, 14th

FC Karelia Petrozavodsk (Russian: ФК «Карелия Петрозаводск») is an association football team from Petrozavodsk (in 2011 temporarily played in Saint Petersburg at Petrovsky Small Arena), Russia founded in 2011. It played in the Russian Second Division from 2011 to 2012–13 season, after which it dropped the professional status. It returned to the third-level Russian Professional Football League for the 2015–16 season, after which it dropped out of professional-level competitions once again.
