= FC Energiya Volzhsky =

- Full name: Football Club Energiya Volzhsky
- Founded: 1956; 70 years ago
- Ground: Loginov Stadium
- Chairman: Mikhail Kubantsev
- Manager: Dmitri Piskunov
- League: Russian Amateur Football League
- 2013–14: Russian Professional Football League, Zone South, 18th (relegated)
Home colours	Away colours

FC Energiya Volzhsky (Russian: ФК "Энергия Волжский") is an association football club from Volzhsky, Russia, founded in 1956. It plays in the Russian Amateur Football League. It spent several seasons in the Russian First Division in the 1990s. In the past, the team was called Torpedo Volzhsky (1976–1977 and 1980–2007) and Trud Volzhsky (1978–1979).
