= 2010 FC Rotor Volgograd season =

Rotor Volgograd
2010 season
- Chairman: Viktor Maksin; Andrei Krivov
- Manager: Vladimir Faizulin; Vitaliy Shevchenko
- Stadium: Tsentralniy, Volgograd
- First Division: 17th
- Russian Cup: Fifth round vs Salyut Belgorod
- Top goalscorer: League: Essau Kanyenda (7); All: Essau Kanyenda (7)
- Highest home attendance: 6,000
- Lowest home attendance: 1,500
- Average home league attendance: 3,480
| Home colours | Away colours | Third colours |

The 2010 Rotor Volgograd season was the first season that the club played in the Russian First Division.

== Squad ==
Note: Flags indicate national team as defined under FIFA eligibility rules; some limited exceptions apply. Players may hold more than one non-FIFA nationality.

| No. | Pos. | Nation | Player |
|---|---|---|---|
| 1 | GK | RUS | Aleksandr Malyshev |
| 2 | DF | RUS | Ilya Ionov |
| 3 | DF | RUS | Nikolai Olenikov (captain) |
| 4 | DF | RUS | Stepan Ryabokon |
| 5 | DF | RUS | Dmitri Guz |
| 6 | DF | RUS | Aleksandr Kukanos |
| 7 | MF | RUS | Vladimir Smirnov |
| 8 | DF | RUS | Vasili Chernov |
| 9 | FW | RUS | Mikhail Markosov |
| 10 | FW | RUS | Viktor Borisov |
| 11 | FW | MWI | Essau Kanyenda |
| 12 | FW | RUS | Mikhail Mysin |
| 13 | MF | RUS | Igor Shestakov |
| 14 | DF | RUS | Aleksei Yepifanov |

| No. | Pos. | Nation | Player |
|---|---|---|---|
| 15 | DF | RUS | Ruslan Beslaneyev |
| 17 | MF | RUS | Oleg Aleynik |
| 18 | MF | RUS | Sergei Shudrov |
| 19 | MF | RUS | Sergei Mikhailov |
| 21 | FW | RUS | Denis Dorozhkin |
| 22 | DF | RUS | Pavel Mogilevskiy |
| 23 | MF | RUS | Oleg Trifonov |
| 24 | MF | RUS | Murad Ramazanov |
| 25 | MF | RUS | Aleksandr Gaidukov |
| 27 | FW | RUS | Aleksandr Savin |
| 28 | MF | RUS | Kirill Kochubei |
| 29 | DF | RUS | Aleksei Zhitnikov |
| 30 | GK | RUS | Andrei Chichkin |
| 77 | GK | RUS | Andrei Nikitin |

== Transfers ==
=== Winter 2009/2010 ===
In: Note: Flags indicate national team as defined under FIFA eligibility rules; some limited exceptions apply. Players may hold more than one non-FIFA nationality.

| No. | Pos. | Nation | Player |
|---|---|---|---|
| 1 | GK | RUS | Aleksandr Malyshev (from (Russia) Volgograd) |
| 2 | DF | RUS | Ilya Ionov (from (Russia) Energiya Volzhsky) |
| 3 | DF | RUS | Nikolai Olenikov (from (Russia) SKA-Energiya Khabarovsk) |
| 4 | DF | RUS | Stepan Ryabokon (from (Russia) Volgograd) |
| 5 | DF | RUS | Dmitri Guz (from (Russia) Bataysk-2007) |
| 7 | MF | RUS | Vladimir Smirnov (from (Russia) Volgograd) |
| 8 | DF | RUS | Vasili Chernov (from (Russia) Volgograd) |
| 9 | FW | RUS | Mikhail Markosov (from (Russia) Stavropol) |
| 10 | FW | RUS | Viktor Borisov (from (Russia) Mordovia Saransk) |
| 11 | FW | MWI | Essau Kanyenda (on loan from (Russia) KAMAZ) |
| 13 | MF | RUS | Igor Shestakov (from (Russia) Sibir Novosibirsk) |
| 14 | DF | RUS | Aleksei Yepifanov (from (Russia) Amkar Perm) |
| 15 | DF | RUS | Ruslan Beslaneyev (from (Russia) Volgograd) |
| 17 | MF | RUS | Oleg Aleynik (from (Russia) Moscow) |
| 18 | MF | RUS | Sergei Shudrov (from (Russia) Moscow) |
| 22 | FW | RUS | Yakov Ehrlich (from (Russia) Rostov) |
| 24 | MF | RUS | Roman Tuzovskiy (from (Russia) Volgograd) |
| 25 | MF | RUS | Aleksandr Gaidukov (from (Russia) Volgograd) |
| 27 | FW | RUS | Aleksandr Savin (from (Russia) Volochanin-Ratmir) |
| 28 | MF | RUS | Kirill Kochubei (from (Russia) Chernomorets Novorossiysk) |
| 29 | DF | RUS | Aleksei Zhitnikov (from (Russia) Sibir Novosibirsk) |
| 30 | GK | RUS | Andrei Chichkin (from (Russia) Luch-Energiya Vladivostok) |
| 77 | GK | RUS | Andrei Nikitin (from (Russia) Energiya Volzhsky) |
| — | FW | RUS | Sergei Ivanov (from Youth system) |
| — | DF | RUS | Andrei Khismatullin (from (Russia) Volgograd) |
| — | DF | RUS | Pavel Orlov (from (Russia) Volgograd) |

Out: Note: Flags indicate national team as defined under FIFA eligibility rules; some limited exceptions apply. Players may hold more than one non-FIFA nationality.

| No. | Pos. | Nation | Player |
|---|---|---|---|
| — | MF | RUS | Nikita Glushkov (on loan to (Russia) Energiya Volzhsky) |
| — | FW | RUS | Sergei Ivanov (on loan to (Russia) Energiya Volzhsky) |
| — | DF | RUS | Andrei Khismatullin (on loan to (Russia) Energiya Volzhsky) |
| — | DF | RUS | Pavel Orlov (on loan to (Russia) Energiya Volzhsky) |
| — | MF | RUS | Pavel Veretennikov (on loan to (Russia) Energiya Volzhsky) |

=== Summer ===
In: Note: Flags indicate national team as defined under FIFA eligibility rules; some limited exceptions apply. Players may hold more than one non-FIFA nationality.

| No. | Pos. | Nation | Player |
|---|---|---|---|
| 6 | DF | RUS | Aleksandr Kukanos (on loan from (Russia) KAMAZ) |
| 12 | FW | RUS | Mikhail Mysin (on loan from (Russia) Volga Nizhny Novgorod) |
| 19 | MF | RUS | Sergei Mikhailov (from (Russia) Avangard Kursk) |
| 21 | FW | RUS | Denis Dorozhkin (on loan from (Russia) Krasnodar) |
| 22 | DF | RUS | Pavel Mogilevskiy (from (Russia) Baltika Kaliningrad) |
| 23 | MF | RUS | Oleg Trifonov (on loan from (Russia) Volga Nizhny Novgorod) |
| 24 | MF | RUS | Murad Ramazanov (from (Latvia) Daugava) |

Out: Note: Flags indicate national team as defined under FIFA eligibility rules; some limited exceptions apply. Players may hold more than one non-FIFA nationality.

| No. | Pos. | Nation | Player |
|---|---|---|---|
| 22 | FW | RUS | Yakov Ehrlich (on loan to (Russia) Gubkin) |
| 24 | MF | RUS | Roman Tuzovskiy (to (Russia) Volgar-Gazprom Astrakhan) |

== Competitions ==
=== Friendlies ===
==== First Squad ====
| 9 February 2010 Pre-season | Gazovik Orenburg | 1–2 | Rotor Volgograd | Adler |
| | 1:0 ? 37' (pen.) | | 1:1 Markosov 75'; 1:2 Borisov 84' |

| 12 February 2010 Pre-season | Torpedo Armavir | 0–1 | Rotor Volgograd | Sochi |
| | | | 0:1 Markosov 75' |

| 23 February 2010 Pre-season | Taraz (Kazakhstan) | 0–1 | (Russia) Rotor Volgograd | (Turkey) Belek |
| | | | 0:1 Markosov 40' | Stadium: Papillon |

| 27 February 2010 Pre-season | Metallurg-Yenisey Krasnoyarsk | 1–1 | Rotor Volgograd | Turkey |
| | 1:0 Pyatikopov 65' | | 1:1 Borisov 76' |

| 3 March 2010 Pre-season | Volgar-Gazprom Astrakhan | 0–1 | Rotor Volgograd | Turkey |
| | | | 0:1 Kanyenda 41' |

| 14 March 2010 Pre-season | Avangard Kursk | 0–2 | Rotor Volgograd | Turkey |
| | | | 0:1 ? 8' (ag.); 0:2 Kanyenda 64' |

| 17 March 2010 Pre-season | Shinnik Yaroslavl | 1–0 | Rotor Volgograd | (Turkey) Antalya |
| | 1:0 Ryzhkov 79' | | | Stadium: 1C |

| 22 March 2010 Pre-season | Vitebsk (Belarus) | 1–0 | (Russia) Rotor Volgograd | Turkey |
| | 1:1 Chaley 78' | | 0:1 Shestakov 19' |

| 19 July 2010 Mid-season | Zhemchuzhina-Sochi | 3–0 | Rotor Volgograd | Kislovodsk |
| | 1:0 Belousov 22'; 2:0 Rukhaia 39'; 3:0 Dubrovin 87' | | | Stadium: Tsentralniy |

| 23 July 2010 Mid-season | Krasnodar | 4–1 | Rotor Volgograd | Kislovodsk |
| | 1:1 Yepifanov 23' (ag.); 2:1 Dedechko 54'; 3:1 Gogniyev 64'; 4:1 Komkov 85' | | 0:1 Zhitnikov 22' | Stadium: Tsentralniy; Attendance: 100 |

| 26 July 2010 Mid-season | Dynamo Stavropol | 1–0 | Rotor Volgograd | Kislovodsk |
| | 1:0 Bidov 21' |

==== Reserve Squad ====
| 9 February 2010 Pre-season | Volga Ulyanovsk | 1–1 | Rotor Volgograd | Adler |
| | 1:1 Sergei Guk 81' | | 0:1 Sergei Ivanov 35' |

| 12 February 2010 Pre-season | Lokomotiv Moscow (reserve) | 1–3 | Rotor Volgograd | Sochi |
| | 1:0 Ozdoyev 20' | | 1:1 Gaidukov 25'; 1:2 Karkayev; 1:3 Boyarintsev |

| 23 February 2010 Pre-season | Tom Tomsk (reserve) | 0–4 | Rotor Volgograd | (Turkey) Belek |
| | | | Borisov (penalty missed) 35'; 0:1 Sergei Ivanov 67'; 0:2 Obozny 70'; 0:3 Borisov 90+1'; 0:4 Borisov 90+3' | Stadium: Papillon |

| 27 February 2010 Pre-season | Ile-Saulet (Kazakhstan) | 0–1 | (Russia) Rotor Volgograd | Turkey |
| | | | 0:1 Karkayev 32' |

| 3 March 2010 Pre-season | Thisted (Denmark) | 0–3 | (Russia) Rotor Volgograd | Turkey |
| | | | 0:1 Kochubei 11' ? (penalty missed) 70'; 0:2 Karkayev 78'; 0:3 Ryabokon 83' | Referee: (Russia) Eduard Maliy |

| 14 March 2010 Pre-season | Kazakhmys (Kazakhstan) | 0–0 | (Russia) Rotor Volgograd | (Turkey) Belek |

| 17 March 2010 Pre-season | Rubin Kazan (reserve) | 0–2 | Rotor Volgograd | Turkey |
| | | | 0:1 Savin 50'; 0:2 Savin 65' |

| 22 March 2010 Pre-season | Sakhalin Yuzhno-Sakhalinsk | 1–1 | Rotor Volgograd | Turkey |
| | 1:1 Antipov 54' (pen.) | | 0:1 Aleynik 15' |

| 23 July 2010 Mid-season | Krasnodar | 0–1 | Rotor Volgograd | Kislovodsk |
| | | | 0:1 Borisov 21' | Stadium: Tsentralniy; Attendance: 50 |

| 26 July 2010 Mid-season | Dynamo Stavropol | 0–3 | Rotor Volgograd | Kislovodsk |
| | | | 0:1 Dorozhkin 14'; 0:2 Kiselyov 19'; 0:3 Trifonov 31' |

=== Russian First Division ===
==== Results ====
| 27 March 2010 1 | Volga Nizhny Novgorod | 0–0 | Rotor Volgograd | Nizhny Novgorod |
| 16:00 MSK (UTC+4) | | Summary | | Stadium: Severny; Attendance: 3,000; Referee: Vladimir Rogulev (Lomonosov) |

| 30 March 2010 2 | KAMAZ Naberezhnye Chelny | 2–0 | Rotor Volgograd | Naberezhnye Chelny |
| 18:00 MSK (UTC+4) | 1:0 Serdyukov 78'; 2:0 Gogniyev 86' | Summary | | Stadium: KAMAZ; Attendance: 6,000; Referee: Aleksei Reznikov (Yaroslavl) |

| 7 April 2010 3 | Rotor Volgograd | 0–0 | Irtysh Omsk | Volzhsky |
| 17:00 MSK (UTC+4) | | Summary | | Stadium: Tsentralniy; Attendance: 6,000; Referee: Sergei Karasev (Moscow) |

| 10 April 2010 4 | Rotor Volgograd | 1–2 | Ural Yekaterinburg | Volzhsky |
| 17:00 MSK (UTC+4) | 1:1 Shestakov 84' | Summary | 0:1 Tumasyan 31'; 1:2 Shatov 90+' | Stadium: Tsentralniy; Attendance: 3,500; Referee: Evgeni Turbin (Moscow) |

| 18 April 2010 5 | Dynamo Saint Petersburg | 4–1 | Rotor Volgograd | Saint Petersburg |
| 16:00 MSK (UTC+4) | 1:0 Gonezhukov 24'; 2:0 Rogaciov 44'; 3:0 Gonezhukov 58'; 4:1 Gonezhukov 79' | Summary | 3:1 Gaidukov 61' | Stadium: MSA Petrovskiy; Attendance: 2,000; Referee: Dmitri Popov (Moscow) |

| 21 April 2010 6 | Baltika Kaliningrad | 3–2 | Rotor Volgograd | Kaliningrad |
| 20:00 MSK (UTC+4) | 1:1 Golubov 33'; 2:1 Golubov 40' (pen.); 3:1 Golubov 43' | Summary | 0:1 Borisov 19'; 3:2 Kanyenda 45+' | Stadium: Baltika; Attendance: 4,500; Referee: Sergey Lapochkin (Saint Petersburg) |

| 29 April 2010 7 | Rotor Volgograd | 1–0 | Dynamo Bryansk | Volgograd |
| 19:00 MSK (UTC+4) | 1:0 Markosov 42' | Summary | | Stadium: Tsentralniy; Attendance: 6,000; Referee: Sergei Kuznetsov (Krasnozavodsk) |

| 2 May 2010 8 | Rotor Volgograd | 1–0 | Shinnik Yaroslavl | Volgograd |
| 19:00 MSK (UTC+4) | 1:0 Kanyenda 79' (pen.) | Summary | | Stadium: Tsentralniy; Attendance: 6,000; Referee: Vyacheslav Kharlamov (Moscow) |

| 10 May 2010 9 | Krasnodar | 3–0 | Rotor Volgograd | Krasnodar |
| 19:00 MSK (UTC+4) | 1:0 Miroshnichenko 15'; 2:0 Yarkin 55'; 3:0 Kaleshin 64' (pen.) | Summary | | Stadium: Kuban; Attendance: 7,800; Referee: Mikhail Vilkov (Nizhny Novgorod) |

| 13 May 2010 10 | Zhemchuzhina-Sochi | 2–2 | Rotor Volgograd | Sochi |
| 18:30 MSK (UTC+4) | 1:0 Zebelyan 24'; 2:1 Zebelyan 75' | Summary | 1:1 Aleynik 38'; 2:2 Ehrlich 90+' | Stadium: Tsentralniy; Attendance: 8,700; Referee: Vasili Miroshnichenko (Rostov-on-Don) |

| 21 May 2010 11 | Rotor Volgograd | 0–2 | Nizhny Novgorod | Volgograd |
| 19:00 MSK (UTC+4) | | Summary | 0:1 Tikhonovetsky 22'; 0:2 Gavryuk 55' | Stadium: Tsentralniy; Attendance: 5,000; Referee: Aleksei Nikolaev (Moscow) |

| 24 May 2010 12 | Rotor Volgograd | 0–6 | Mordovia Saransk | Volgograd |
| 19:00 MSK (UTC+4) | | Summary | 0:1 Semler 16'; 0:2 Panchenko 26'; 0:3 Panchenko 32'; 0:4 Sysuyev 39'; 0:5 Kuleshov 68'; 0:6 Koryan 85' | Stadium: Tsentralniy; Attendance: 2,500; Referee: Almir Kayumov (Moscow) |

| 1 June 2010 13 | Volgar-Gazprom Astrakhan | 0–0 | Rotor Volgograd | Astrakhan |
| 19:00 MSK (UTC+4) | | Summary | | Stadium: Tsentralniy; Attendance: 3,000; Referee: Aleksandr Gvardis (Kaliningrad) |

| 12 June 2010 15 | Avangard Kursk | 1–3 | Rotor Volgograd | Kursk |
| 18:30 MSK (UTC+4) | 1:1 Korovushkin 24' | Summary | 0:1 Guz 8'; 1:2 Borisov 36'; 1:3 Kanyenda 84' (pen.) | Stadium: Trudovye Rezervy; Attendance: 6,200; Referee: Yuri Rubtsov (Moscow) |

| 15 June 2010 16 | Salyut Belgorod | 2–1 | Rotor Volgograd | Belgorod |
| 19:00 MSK (UTC+4) | Bulyga (penalty missed) 43'; 1:0 Rodenkov 64'; 2:0 Leshonok 86' | Summary | 2:1 Markosov 89' | Stadium: Salyut; Attendance: 4,000; Referee: Sergey Lapochkin (Saint Petersburg) |

| 23 June 2010 17 | Rotor Volgograd | 2–2 | Luch-Energiya Vladivostok | Volgograd |
| 19:00 MSK (UTC+4) | 1:0 Kanyenda 8'; 2:0 Zhitnikov 10' | Summary | 2:1 Yegorov 55'; 2:2 Udaly 88' | Stadium: Tsentralniy; Attendance: 3,000; Referee: Aleksei Reznikov (Yaroslavl) |

| 26 June 2010 18 | Rotor Volgograd | 0–2 | SKA-Energiya Khabarovsk | Volgograd |
| 19:00 MSK (UTC+4) | | Summary | 0:1 Karmazinenko 45+'; 0:2 Nikiforov 90+' | Stadium: Tsentralniy; Attendance: 2,000; Referee: Lasha Verulidze (Vladikavkaz) |

| 6 July 2010 19 | Kuban Krasnodar | 3–0 | Rotor Volgograd | Krasnodar |
| 20:00 MSK (UTC+4) | 1:0 Bucur 5'; 2:0 Nikezić 44'; 3:0 Nikezić 62' | Summary | | Stadium: Kuban; Attendance: 6,000; Referee: Denis Shpilev (Belgorod) |

| 9 July 2010 20 | Khimki | 1–3 | Rotor Volgograd | Khimki |
| 19:00 MSK (UTC+4) | 1:3 Mamonov 88' | Summary | 0:1 Savin 56' (pen.); 0:2 Ehrlich 60'; 0:3 Tuzovskiy 81' | Stadium: Rodina; Attendance: 1,000; Referee: Denis Mareyev (Moscow) |

| 30 July 2010 21 | Rotor Volgograd | 1–4 | Volga Nizhny Novgorod | Volgograd |
| 19:00 MSK (UTC+4) | 1:2 Kanyenda 38' | Summary | 0:1 Martsvaladze 7'; 0:2 Tursunov 14'; 1:3 Buivolov 52'; 1:4 Tursunov 89' | Stadium: Tsentralniy; Attendance: 2,500; Referee: Vitali Meshkov (Dmitrov) |

| 2 August 2010 22 | Rotor Volgograd | 1–0 | KAMAZ Naberezhnye Chelny | Volgograd |
| 19:00 MSK (UTC+4) | 1:0 Trifonov 66' (pen.) | Summary | | Stadium: Tsentralniy; Attendance: 1,500; Referee: Vasili Miroshnichenko (Rostov-on-Don) |

| 10 August 2010 23 | Irtysh Omsk | 2–0 | Rotor Volgograd | Omsk |
| 15:30 MSK (UTC+4) | 1:0 Bagayev 13'; 2:0 Druzin 21' | Summary | | Stadium: Krasnaya Zvezda; Attendance: 2,500; Referee: Aleksei Lobanov (Irkutsk) |

| 13 August 2010 24 | Ural Yekaterinburg | 4–0 | Rotor Volgograd | Yekaterinburg |
| 17:00 MSK (UTC+4) | 1:0 Sikimić 62'; 2:0 Zubko 73'; 3:0 Temnikov 81'; 4:0 Fidler 89' | Summary | | Stadium: Uralmash; Attendance: 4,500; Referee: Igor Nizovtsev (Nizhny Novgorod) |

| 21 August 2010 25 | Rotor Volgograd | 1–2 | Dynamo Saint Petersburg | Volgograd |
| 19:00 MSK (UTC+4) | 1:1 Kanyenda 80' | Summary | 0:1 Gonezhukov 62'; 1:2 Kozlov 85' | Stadium: Tsentralniy; Attendance: 3,000; Referee: Almir Kayumov (Moscow) |

| 24 August 2010 26 | Rotor Volgograd | 1–0 | Baltika Kaliningrad | Volgograd |
| 19:00 MSK (UTC+4) | 1:0 Ionov 3'; Kanyenda (penalty missed) 36' | Summary | | Stadium: Tsentralniy; Attendance: 2,500; Referee: Vyacheslav Popov (Yekaterinburg) |

| 31 August 2010 27 | Dynamo Bryansk | 0–1 | Rotor Volgograd | Bryansk |
| 19:00 MSK (UTC+4) | | Summary | 0:1 Zhitnikov 81' | Stadium: Dynamo; Attendance: 7,432; Referee: Sergei Karasev (Moscow) |

| 3 September 2010 28 | Shinnik Yaroslavl | 1–1 | Rotor Volgograd | Yaroslavl |
| 18:30 MSK (UTC+4) | 1:0 Grigoryan 15' | Summary | 1:1 Dorozhkin 74' | Stadium: Shinnik; Attendance: 2,500; Referee: Vladimir Kazmenko (Rostov-on-Don) |

| 11 September 2010 29 | Rotor Volgograd | 0–1 | Krasnodar | Volgograd |
| 19:00 MSK (UTC+4) | | Summary | 0:1 Dedechko 61' (pen.) | Stadium: Tsentralniy; Attendance: 4,500; Referee: Denis Mareyev (Moscow) |

| 14 September 2010 30 | Rotor Volgograd | 1–0 | Zhemchuzhina-Sochi | Volgograd |
| 19:00 MSK (UTC+4) | 1:0 Zhitnikov 17' | Summary | | Stadium: Tsentralniy; Attendance: 5,000; Referee: Dmitri Popov (Moscow) |

| 22 September 2010 31 | Nizhny Novgorod | 3–0 | Rotor Volgograd | Nizhny Novgorod |
| 17:00 MSK (UTC+4) | 1:0 Mikuckis 2'; 2:0 Monaryov 27'; 3:0 Akopyants 38' | Summary | | Stadium: Severny; Attendance: 1,500; Referee: Aleksei Yeskov (Moscow) |

| 25 September 2010 32 | Mordovia Saransk | 3–1 | Rotor Volgograd | Saransk |
| 18:00 MSK (UTC+4) | 1:0 Panchenko 18'; 2:1 Rustem Mukhametshin 24'; 3:1 Prokofyev 82' | Summary | 1:1 Mikhailov 22' | Stadium: Start; Attendance: 4,500; Referee: Vladimir Rogulev (Lomonosov) |

| 6 October 2010 34 | Rotor Volgograd | 0–1 | Volgar-Gazprom Astrakhan | Volgograd |
| 19:00 MSK (UTC+4) | | Summary | 0:1 Kiselyov 21' | Stadium: Tsentralniy; Attendance: 3,000; Referee: Mikhail Vilkov (Nizhny Novgorod) |

| 14 October 2010 35 | Rotor Volgograd | 1–0 | Avangard Kursk | Volgograd |
| 19:00 MSK (UTC+4) | 1:0 Kanyenda 16' | Summary | | Stadium: Tsentralniy; Attendance: 3,000; Referee: Aleksandr Gonchar (Sochi) |

| 17 October 2010 36 | Rotor Volgograd | 0–1 | Salyut Belgorod | Volgograd |
| 18:00 MSK (UTC+4) | | Summary | 0:1 Kushov 87' (pen.) | Stadium: Tsentralniy; Attendance: 3,100; Referee: Timur Arslanbekov (Moscow) |

| 24 October 2010 37 | Luch-Energiya Vladivostok | 1–1 | Rotor Volgograd | Vladivostok |
| 09:00 MSK (UTC+4) | 1:0 Yegorov 33' | Summary | 1:1 Dorozhkin 64' | Stadium: Dynamo; Attendance: 3,700; Referee: German Kravchenko (Pskov) |

| 27 October 2010 38 | SKA-Energiya Khabarovsk | 2–0 | Rotor Volgograd | Khabarovsk |
| 12:00 MSK (UTC+4) | 1:0 Karmazinenko 57'; 2:0 Zapoyaska 90+' | Summary | | Stadium: Lenin; Attendance: 2,000; Referee: Dmitri Popov (Moscow) |

| 3 November 2010 39 | Rotor Volgograd | 0–3 | Kuban Krasnodar | Volgograd |
| 18:00 MSK (UTC+4) | | Summary | 0:1 Kalimullin 18' (pen.); 0:2 Davydov 62'; 0:3 Bucur 87' | Stadium: Tsentralniy; Attendance: 2,000; Referee: Vladimir Rogulev (Lomonosov) |

| 6 November 2010 40 | Rotor Volgograd | 0–1 | Khimki | Volgograd |
| 14:00 MSK (UTC+4) | | Summary | 0:1 Yusupov 74' | Stadium: Tsentralniy; Attendance: 3,000; Referee: Aleksei Reznikov (Yaroslavl) |

==== Table ====
| Pos | Team | Pld | W | D | L | GF | GA | GD | Pts |
|---|---|---|---|---|---|---|---|---|---|
| 1 | Kuban Krasnodar | 38 | 24 | 8 | 6 | 51 | 20 | +31 | 80 |
| 2 | Volga Nizhny Novgorod | 38 | 19 | 14 | 5 | 62 | 25 | +37 | 71 |
| 3 | Nizhny Novgorod | 38 | 21 | 7 | 10 | 60 | 41 | +19 | 70 |
| 4 | KAMAZ Naberezhnye Chelny | 38 | 19 | 9 | 10 | 55 | 43 | +12 | 66 |
| 5 | Krasnodar | 38 | 17 | 10 | 11 | 60 | 44 | +16 | 61 |
| 6 | Mordovia Saransk | 38 | 16 | 10 | 12 | 53 | 40 | +13 | 58 |
| 7 | Ural Yekaterinburg | 38 | 14 | 16 | 8 | 38 | 28 | +10 | 58 |
| 8 | Zhemchuzhina-Sochi | 38 | 16 | 9 | 13 | 45 | 44 | +1 | 57 |
| 9 | Volgar-Gazprom Astrakhan | 38 | 16 | 9 | 13 | 45 | 48 | −3 | 57 |
| 10 | Shinnik Yaroslavl | 38 | 14 | 13 | 11 | 43 | 31 | +12 | 55 |
| 11 | SKA-Energiya Khabarovsk | 38 | 15 | 8 | 15 | 37 | 39 | −2 | 53 |
| 12 | Luch-Energiya Vladivostok | 38 | 13 | 13 | 12 | 42 | 42 | 0 | 52 |
| 13 | Khimki | 38 | 11 | 17 | 10 | 39 | 38 | +1 | 50 |
| 14 | Dynamo Bryansk | 38 | 11 | 11 | 16 | 53 | 54 | −1 | 44 |
| 15 | Baltika Kaliningrad | 38 | 11 | 10 | 17 | 38 | 47 | −9 | 43 |
| 16 | Dynamo Saint Petersburg | 38 | 9 | 10 | 19 | 32 | 53 | −21 | 37 |
| 17 | Rotor Volgograd | 38 | 9 | 7 | 22 | 27 | 64 | −37 | 34 |
| 18 | Salyut Belgorod | 38 | 7 | 13 | 18 | 30 | 47 | −17 | 34 |
| 19 | Irtysh Omsk | 38 | 6 | 10 | 22 | 26 | 52 | −26 | 28 |
| 20 | Avangard Kursk | 38 | 7 | 6 | 25 | 31 | 67 | −36 | 27 |

Promoted
Relegated

=== Russian Cup ===
| 1 July 2010 Fifth round | Rotor Volgograd | 0–1 (a.e.t.) | Salyut Belgorod | Volgograd |
| 19:00 MSK (UTC+4) | | Summary | 0:1 Korobkin 100' | Stadium: Tsentralniy; Attendance: 2,500; Referee: Aleksandr Yegorov (Saransk) |

== Statistics ==
=== Squad statistics ===
==== League ====
===== Minutes played =====
| Pos. | Player | Minutes Played per Round | | | | | | | | | | | | | | | | | | | | | | | | | | | | | | | | | | | | | | App. | GS | ↑ | ↓ | Min. |
| Pos. | Player | 1 | 2 | 3 | 4 | 5 | 6 | 7 | 8 | 9 | 10 | 11 | 12 | 13 | 15 | 16 | 17 | 18 | 19 | 20 | 21 | 22 | 23 | 24 | 25 | 26 | 27 | 28 | 29 | 30 | 31 | 32 | 34 | 35 | 36 | 37 | 38 | 39 | 40 | App. | GS | ↑ | ↓ | Min. |
|---|---|---|---|---|---|---|---|---|---|---|---|---|---|---|---|---|---|---|---|---|---|---|---|---|---|---|---|---|---|---|---|---|---|---|---|---|---|---|---|---|---|---|---|---|
| GK | (Russia) Andrei Chichkin | 90 | 90 | 90 | 90 | 90 | 90 | • | • | • | • | • | • | 90 | 90 | 90 | • | • | 90 | 90 | 90 | 90 | 90 | 90 | 90 | 90 | 90 | 90 | 90 | 90 | 90 | 90 | 90 | 90 | 90 | 90 | 90 | 90 | • | 29 | 29 | 0 | 0 | 2610 |
| GK | (Russia) Aleksandr Malyshev | • | • | • | • | • | • | 90 | 90 | 90 | 90 | 90 | 90 | • | • | • | 90 | 90 | • | • | • | • | • | • | • | • | • | • | • | • | • | • | • | • | • | • | • | • | 90 | 9 | 9 | 0 | 0 | 810 |
| GK | (Russia) Andrei Nikitin | | | | | | | | | | | | | | | | | | | | | | | | | | | | | | | | | | | | | | | 0 | 0 | 0 | 0 | 0 |
| DF | (Russia) Aleksei Zhitnikov | 90 | 90 | 90 | 90 | 90 | 90 | 90 | 84↓ | 90 | 90 | 90 | 90 | 90 | 90 | 90 | 90 | 90 | 90 | 90 | 90 | 66↓ | 83↓ | 21↑ | 21↑ | 90 | 90↓ | 65↓ | 90 | 90↓ | 90 | 90 | 90 | 90 | 90 | 90 | 90 | 80↓ | 90 | 38 | 36 | 2 | 7 | 3210 |
| DF | (Russia) Nikolai Olenikov | 90 | 90 | 90 | 90 | 90 | 90 | 90 | 90 | 90 | 90 | 90 | 90 | 90 | 90 | 90 | 90 | 90 | | | • | 90 | | 90 | 90 | 90 | 90 | 90 | 90 | 90 | 90 | 90 | 90 | | • | 90 | | 83↓ | 90 | 31 | 31 | 0 | 1 | 2783 |
| DF | (Russia) Aleksei Yepifanov | 90 | 90 | 90 | 90 | 84↓ | | 90 | 90 | 90 | 90 | 90 | 64↓ | 77↓ | | • | • | 83↓ | 90 | 90 | 90 | 90 | 90 | • | • | 1↑ | • | • | 90 | 90 | 52↓ | 90 | • | 90 | 86* | | 90 | 90 | | 27 | 26 | 1 | 5 | 2247 |
| DF | (Russia) Ilya Ionov | 90 | 90 | 90 | 90 | 90 | 90 | 90 | 90 | | 90 | | | | • | 90 | 90 | 90 | 90 | 90 | 89↓ | 90 | 44↑ | 90 | 90 | 90 | 90 | 90 | | 90 | 90 | | | | | | | | | 24 | 23 | 1 | 1 | 2113 |
| DF | (Russia) Dmitri Guz | • | 8↑ | • | • | • | 90 | • | • | 90 | • | • | 26↑ | 13↑ | 90 | 90 | 90 | 90 | 90 | 90 | 90 | 46* | | 90 | | | | | • | • | • | • | 90 | 90 | 90 | 90 | 90 | 90 | | 20 | 17 | 3 | 0 | 1533 |
| DF | (Russia) Pavel Mogilevskiy | | | | | | | | | | | | | | | | | | | | | | | | 90 | 90 | 90 | 90 | 90 | 90 | 90 | 90 | 90 | 90 | 90 | 52* | | 90 | 90 | 14 | 14 | 0 | 0 | 1222 |
| DF | (Russia) Aleksandr Kukanos | | | | | | | | | | | | | | | | | | | | 90 | x | 90 | 90 | 90 | 84↓ | 90 | 90 | 24↓ | | | | 90 | 64↓ | | | | | | 10 | 10 | 0 | 3 | 802 |
| DF | (Russia) Ruslan Beslaneyev | 1↑ | 15↑ | | | | | | | | | | | • | | | 88↓ | 53↓ | • | 90 | 1↑ | 90 | 90 | | | | | | | | | | • | 26↑ | 90 | 90 | 66↓ | | • | 12 | 8 | 4 | 3 | 700 |
| DF | (Russia) Vasili Chernov | • | • | • | | | • | 1↑ | 6↑ | • | • | 90 | 90 | | | | | | | • | | | | | | | | | | | | | | | | | | | | 4 | 2 | 2 | 0 | 187 |
| DF | (Russia) Stepan Ryabokon | | • | | | | | • | | | | • | | | | | | | | • | | • | • | • | | • | • | • | • | • | | • | | | • | • | • | 7↑ | 90 | 2 | 1 | 1 | 0 | 97 |
| MF | (Russia) Igor Shestakov | 90 | 90 | 90 | 90 | 78↓ | 90 | 90 | 90 | 46↓ | | • | 90 | 48↑ | • | • | 28↑ | | 90 | 90 | 77↓ | • | 64↓ | 7↑ | • | | | 21↑ | • | 14↑ | 26↑ | 90 | 36↑ | 90 | 90 | 90 | | 90 | 76↓ | 27 | 20 | 7 | 5 | 1871 |
| MF | (Russia) Sergei Shudrov | 72* | | 65↓ | • | 90 | 78↓ | | | 11↑ | 90 | 90 | 33↓ | 90 | 90 | 77* | | 54↓ | 39↑ | 90 | 90 | 90 | | | | | | 69↓ | 18↑ | 90 | 64↓ | • | | • | 31↑ | 1↑ | 74↓ | • | 14↑ | 24 | 18 | 6 | 7 | 1510 |
| MF | (Russia) Roman Tuzovskiy | 90↓ | 65↓ | 90 | 90 | 75↓ | 90 | 90↓ | 90 | 90 | 66↑ | 90 | 90 | 90 | 88↓ | 90 | 20↑ | 37↑ | 24↑ | 17↑ | • | | | | | | | | | | | | | | | | | | | 19 | 14 | 5 | 5 | 1382 |
| MF | (Russia) Oleg Aleynik | 1↑ | 82↓ | • | 15↑ | | • | 63↓ | 75↓ | 79↓ | 82↓ | 90 | 90 | 42↓ | 90 | 76↓ | 90 | 90 | 51↓ | | | | 26↑ | 83↓ | 66↓ | • | • | 25↑ | | | • | | | | | | 16↑ | • | 7↑ | 21 | 15 | 6 | 10 | 1239 |
| MF | (Russia) Oleg Trifonov | | | | | | | | | | | | | | | | | | | | | 87↓ | 90 | 90 | 90 | 90 | 90 | 90 | 90 | 90 | 79↓ | 90 | 31↓ | | | | | 90 | 80↓ | 14 | 14 | 0 | 4 | 1177 |
| MF | (Russia) Sergei Mikhailov | | | | | | | | | | | | | | | | | | | | | | | | 75↓ | 90↓ | 90 | | 90 | 76↓ | 90 | 90 | 73↓ | 90↓ | 71↓ | 90 | 90 | 23↑ | | 13 | 12 | 1 | 6 | 1038 |
| MF | (Russia) Murad Ramazanov | | | | | | | | | | | | | | | | | | | | | | 90 | 90 | 90 | 90 | 90 | 90 | 90 | | | | 54↓ | 1↑ | • | 58↓ | 86↓ | 67↓ | 83↓ | 13 | 12 | 1 | 5 | 979 |
| MF | (Russia) Vladimir Smirnov | | 55↓ | 55↓ | • | • | 20↑ | 37↑ | 44↑ | • | 87↓ | 56↓ | 36↓ | 90 | 90 | 29↑ | 2↑ | • | 12↑ | | | • | 46↓ | | | | | | | | | • | | 78↓ | 59↓ | • | 90 | 10↑ | 90 | 19 | 12 | 7 | 8 | 986 |
| MF | (Russia) Kirill Kochubei | 18↑ | 75↓ | 25↑ | 65↓ | 12↑ | 6↑* | | 15↑ | 44↑ | 77↓ | 56↓ | • | | 4↑ | • | 62↓ | • | 78↓ | 3↑ | 13↑ | | | | | | | | | | | | | | | | | | • | 15 | 6 | 9 | 6 | 553 |
| MF | (Russia) Aleksandr Gaidukov | 5↑ | 25↑ | • | 28↑ | 90 | 70↓ | 53↓ | 46↓ | 90 | 24↓ | | | 21↑ | 2↑ | | | | 1↑ | • | | | | | | | | | | | | | | | | | • | | | 12 | 6 | 6 | 4 | 455 |
| FW | (Malawi) Essau Kanyenda | 72↓ | x | 90 | 75↓ | 90 | 73↓ | 90 | 90 | 81↓ | 90 | | 90 | 72↓ | 86↓ | 90 | 90 | 90 | | | 69↓ | x | | | 24↑ | 66↓ | 90 | | 90 | 90↓ | 90 | 87↓ | | 46↓ | 64↓ | | | 90 | 90 | 27 | 26 | 1 | 12 | 2165 |
| FW | (Russia) Aleksandr Savin | | | | | 6↑ | | 27↑ | 44↑ | 46↓ | 13↑ | 34↑ | 54↑ | 69↓ | 90 | 61↓ | 70↓ | 70↓ | 89↓ | 73↓ | 21↑ | 24↑ | 7↑ | 69↓ | 69↓ | • | 1↑ | 52↑ | 59↑↓ | 1↑ | 38↑ | 79↓ | 51↑↓ | | | 32↑ | 24↑ | | | 28 | 11 | 17 | 12 | 1273 |
| FW | (Russia) Denis Dorozhkin | | | | | | | | | | | | | | | | | | | | 90 | 90 | 78↓ | 77↓ | 90 | 24↑ | 70↑ | 77↓ | x | 85↓ | 46↓ | 90 | 90 | 44↑ | 26↑ | 90↓ | 78↓ | | | 16 | 12 | 4 | 7 | 1145 |
| FW | (Russia) Viktor Borisov | 90↓ | 35↑ | 35↑ | 62↓ | 34↑ | 65↓ | | | | | 34↑ | • | • | 63↓ | 66↓ | 53↓ | 36↑ | 66↓ | 87↓ | 90 | 3↑ | 12↑ | 13↑ | 15↑ | 6↑ | • | 38↓ | 72↓ | 5↑ | 44↑ | 11↑ | 8↑ | 12↑ | 19↑ | • | 4↑ | | 10↑ | 29 | 11 | 18 | 10 | 1088 |
| FW | (Russia) Mikhail Mysin | | | | | | | | | | | | | | | | | | | | | 90 | 90 | 90 | | 90 | 20↓ | | | | | | 90 | 90 | 90 | 90 | 90 | 89↓ | 81↓ | 12 | 12 | 0 | 3 | 1000 |
| FW | (Russia) Mikhail Markosov | 85↓ | 90 | 90 | 90 | 56↓ | 25↑ | 73↓ | 46↓ | 44↑ | 8↑ | 56↓ | • | 18↑ | • | 14↑ | 37↑ | 7↑ | 90 | 7↑ | | | | | • | | | 13↑ | 7↑ | 1↑ | 11↑ | 3↑ | 17↑ | • | | • | 12↑ | 1↑ | 9↑ | 26 | 9 | 17 | 5 | 910 |
| FW | (Russia) Yakov Ehrlich | | | | 25↑ | 15↑ | 17↑ | 17↑ | • | 9↑ | 3↑ | 34↑ | 57↑ | 90 | 27↑ | 24↑ | • | 20↑ | • | 83↓ | • | • | • | • | | | | | | | | | | | | | | | | 13 | 2 | 11 | 1 | 421 |

Player Started Player Subbed In Player Suspended Player Injured / Sick Player on International Duty Player Left Club / Not Signed / Loan Expired • Player in Application x Player Couldn't Play Against a Team that Owned * Player Dismissed from Field

===== Goal scorers =====
| Rank | Player | Goals per Round | | | | | | | | | | | | | | | | | | | | | | | | | | | | | | | | | | | | | | Total |
| Rank | Player | 1 | 2 | 3 | 4 | 5 | 6 | 7 | 8 | 9 | 10 | 11 | 12 | 13 | 15 | 16 | 17 | 18 | 19 | 20 | 21 | 22 | 23 | 24 | 25 | 26 | 27 | 28 | 29 | 30 | 31 | 32 | 34 | 35 | 36 | 37 | 38 | 39 | 40 | Total |
|---|---|---|---|---|---|---|---|---|---|---|---|---|---|---|---|---|---|---|---|---|---|---|---|---|---|---|---|---|---|---|---|---|---|---|---|---|---|---|---|---|
| 1 | (Malawi) Essau Kanyenda | | | | | | 1 | | 1 | | | | | | 1 | | 1 | | | | 1 | | | | 1 | | | | | | | | | 1 | | | | | | 7 (2) |
| 2 | (Russia) Aleksei Zhitnikov | | | | | | | | | | | | | | | | 1 | | | | | | | | | | 1 | | | 1 | | | | | | | | | | 3 |
| 3 | (Russia) Yakov Ehrlich | | | | | | | | | | 1 | | | | | | | | | 1 | | | | | | | | | | | | | | | | | | | | 2 |
| 3 | (Russia) Mikhail Markosov | | | | | | | 1 | | | | | | | | 1 | | | | | | | | | | | | | | | | | | | | | | | | 2 |
| 3 | (Russia) Viktor Borisov | | | | | | 1 | | | | | | | | 1 | | | | | | | | | | | | | | | | | | | | | | | | | 2 |
| 3 | (Russia) Denis Dorozhkin | | | | | | | | | | | | | | | | | | | | | | | | | | | 1 | | | | | | | | 1 | | | | 2 |
| 4 | (Russia) Aleksandr Gaidukov | | | | | 1 | | | | | | | | | | | | | | | | | | | | | | | | | | | | | | | | | | 1 |
| 4 | (Russia) Sergei Mikhailov | | | | | | | | | | | | | | | | | | | | | | | | | | | | | | | 1 | | | | | | | | 1 |
| 4 | (Russia) Oleg Aleynik | | | | | | | | | | 1 | | | | | | | | | | | | | | | | | | | | | | | | | | | | | 1 |
| 4 | (Russia) Roman Tuzovskiy | | | | | | | | | | | | | | | | | | | 1 | | | | | | | | | | | | | | | | | | | | 1 |
| 4 | (Russia) Dmitri Guz | | | | | | | | | | | | | | 1 | | | | | | | | | | | | | | | | | | | | | | | | | 1 |
| 4 | (Russia) Igor Shestakov | | | | 1 | | | | | | | | | | | | | | | | | | | | | | | | | | | | | | | | | | | 1 |
| 4 | (Russia) Ilya Ionov | | | | | | | | | | | | | | | | | | | | | | | | | 1 | | | | | | | | | | | | | | 1 |
| 4 | (Russia) Oleg Trifonov | | | | | | | | | | | | | | | | | | | | | 1 | | | | | | | | | | | | | | | | | | 1 (1) |
| 4 | (Russia) Aleksandr Savin | | | | | | | | | | | | | | | | | | | 1 | | | | | | | | | | | | | | | | | | | | 1 (1) |

One goal scored from penalty kick

===== Discipline =====
| Rank | Player | Cards per Round | | | | | | | | | | | | | | | | | | | | | | | | | | | | | | | | | | | | | | Booked | (yellow card) (red card) | Sent off (straight red) |
| Rank | Player | 1 | 2 | 3 | 4 | 5 | 6 | 7 | 8 | 9 | 10 | 11 | 12 | 13 | 15 | 16 | 17 | 18 | 19 | 20 | 21 | 22 | 23 | 24 | 25 | 26 | 27 | 28 | 29 | 30 | 31 | 32 | 34 | 35 | 36 | 37 | 38 | 39 | 40 | Booked | (yellow card) (red card) | Sent off (straight red) |
|---|---|---|---|---|---|---|---|---|---|---|---|---|---|---|---|---|---|---|---|---|---|---|---|---|---|---|---|---|---|---|---|---|---|---|---|---|---|---|---|---|---|---|
| 1 | (Russia) Ilya Ionov | | Booked | | Booked | | | Booked | Booked | | | | | | | | Booked | | | | Booked | Booked | | | | | | | | | Booked | | | | | | | | | 8 | 0 | 0 |
| 1 | (Russia) Nikolai Olenikov | | | | | | | | | | Booked | | | Booked | | Booked | | | | | | Booked | | | | | | | | | Booked | Booked | Booked | | | Booked | | | | 8 | 0 | 0 |
| 3 | (Russia) Aleksei Yepifanov | | | | Booked | | | | | Booked | Booked | | | Booked | | | | | | | | | Booked | | | | | | Booked | | | | | | (yellow card) (red card) | | | | | 7 | 1 | 0 |
| 4 | (Russia) Igor Shestakov | | | Booked | | | Booked | Booked | | Booked | | | Booked | | | | | | | | | | | | | | | Booked | | | | | | | | Booked | | | | 7 | 0 | 0 |
| 5 | (Russia) Sergei Shudrov | (yellow card) (red card) | | | | | | | | | | | | Booked | | (yellow card) (red card) | | Booked | | | | | | | | | | | | | Booked | | | | | | | | | 5 | 2 | 0 |
| 6 | (Russia) Murad Ramazanov | | | | | | | | | | | | | | | | | | | | | | Booked | Booked | | | | Booked | Booked | | | | | | | | | | Booked | 5 | 0 | 0 |
| 6 | (Russia) Sergei Mikhailov | | | | | | | | | | | | | | | | | | | | | | | | | Booked | Booked | | | | Booked | Booked | | | Booked | | | | | 5 | 0 | 0 |
| 6 | (Malawi) Essau Kanyenda | | | Booked | | | | | | | | | | | | | | Booked | | | | | | | | Booked | | | | | | Booked | | | Booked | | | | | 5 | 0 | 0 |
| 7 | (Russia) Dmitri Guz | | | | | | Booked | | | | | | | Booked | | | | | Booked | | | Sent off (straight red) | | | | | | | | | | | | | | | | Booked | | 4 | 0 | 1 |
| 8 | (Russia) Viktor Borisov | | | | | | Booked | | | | | | | | Booked | | | | | | | | | | | | | | | | | | | Booked | | | | | | 3 | 0 | 0 |
| 8 | (Russia) Aleksei Zhitnikov | Booked | | | | | | | | | | | | | | | | | | | | | | | | | | | | Booked | | | | | Booked | | | | | 3 | 0 | 0 |
| 9 | (Russia) Yakov Ehrlich | | | | | Booked | | | | | | | | Booked | | | | | | | | | | | | | | | | | | | | | | | | | | 2 | 0 | 0 |
| 9 | (Russia) Aleksandr Kukanos | | | | | | | | | | | | | | | | | | | | | | | | | Booked | | | | | | | Booked | | | | | | | 2 | 0 | 0 |
| 9 | (Russia) Aleksandr Malyshev | | | | | | | | Booked | | | | | | | | Booked | | | | | | | | | | | | | | | | | | | | | | | 2 | 0 | 0 |
| 9 | (Russia) Oleg Trifonov | | | | | | | | | | | | | | | | | | | | | | | | | Booked | | | Booked | | | | | | | | | | | 2 | 0 | 0 |
| 9 | (Russia) Oleg Aleynik | | | | | | | Booked | | | | Booked | | | | | | | | | | | | | | | | | | | | | | | | | | | | 2 | 0 | 0 |
| 9 | (Russia) Aleksandr Savin | | | | | | | | | | | | | | | Booked | | | | | Booked | | | | | | | | | | | | | | | | | | | 2 | 0 | 0 |
| 9 | (Russia) Roman Tuzovskiy | | | | | | | Booked | | | | | | | | | Booked | | | | | | | | | | | | | | | | | | | | | | | 2 | 0 | 0 |
| 10 | (Russia) Kirill Kochubei | | | | | | (yellow card) (red card) | | | | | | | | | | | | | | | | | | | | | | | | | | | | | | | | | 1 | 1 | 0 |
| 10 | (Russia) Pavel Mogilevskiy | | | | | | | | | | | | | | | | | | | | | | | | | | | | | | | | | | | (yellow card) (red card) | | | | 1 | 1 | 0 |
| 11 | (Russia) Aleksandr Gaidukov | | | | | | | | Booked | | | | | | | | | | | | | | | | | | | | | | | | | | | | | | | 1 | 0 | 0 |
| 11 | (Russia) Ruslan Beslaneyev | | | | | | | | | | | | | | | | | | | | | | | | | | | | | | | | | | | | Booked | | | 1 | 0 | 0 |
| 11 | (Russia) Mikhail Markosov | | | | | | | | | | | | | Booked | | | | | | | | | | | | | | | | | | | | | | | | | | 1 | 0 | 0 |
| 11 | (Russia) Mikhail Mysin | | | | | | | | | | | | | | | | | | | | | | | | | | | | | | | | | | | | Booked | | | 1 | 0 | 0 |
| 11 | (Russia) Denis Dorozhkin | | | | | | | | | | | | | | | | | | | | | | | | | | | | | Booked | | | | | | | | | | 1 | 0 | 0 |
| 11 | (Russia) Andrei Chichkin | | | | | | | | | | | | | | | | | | | | | Booked | | | | | | | | | | | | | | | | | | 1 | 0 | 0 |

Player Suspended

==== All Tournaments ====
===== Appearances and goals =====
| No. | Pos | Nat | Player | Total | | First Division | | Russian Cup | |
| No. | Pos | Nat | Player | Apps | Goals | Apps | Goals | Apps | Goals |
|---|---|---|---|---|---|---|---|---|---|
| 30 | GK | (Russia) RUS | Andrei Chichkin | 30 | -47 | 29 | -46 | 1 | -1 |
| 1 | GK | (Russia) RUS | Aleksandr Malyshev | 9 | -18 | 9 | -18 | 0 | 0 |
| 77 | GK | (Russia) RUS | Andrei Nikitin | 0 | 0 | 0 | 0 | 0 | 0 |
| 29 | DF | (Russia) RUS | Aleksei Zhitnikov | 39 | 3 | 38 | 3 | 1 | 0 |
| 3 | DF | (Russia) RUS | Nikolai Olenikov | 32 | 0 | 31 | 0 | 1 | 0 |
| 14 | DF | (Russia) RUS | Aleksei Yepifanov | 27 | 0 | 27 | 0 | 0 | 0 |
| 2 | DF | (Russia) RUS | Ilya Ionov | 25 | 1 | 24 | 1 | 1 | 0 |
| 5 | DF | (Russia) RUS | Dmitri Guz | 21 | 1 | 20 | 1 | 1 | 0 |
| 22 | DF | (Russia) RUS | Pavel Mogilevskiy | 14 | 0 | 14 | 0 | 0 | 0 |
| 15 | DF | (Russia) RUS | Ruslan Beslaneyev | 13 | 0 | 12 | 0 | 1 | 0 |
| 6 | DF | (Russia) RUS | Aleksandr Kukanos | 10 | 0 | 10 | 0 | 0 | 0 |
| 8 | DF | (Russia) RUS | Vasili Chernov | 4 | 0 | 4 | 0 | 0 | 0 |
| 4 | DF | (Russia) RUS | Stepan Ryabokon | 2 | 0 | 2 | 0 | 0 | 0 |
| 13 | MF | (Russia) RUS | Igor Shestakov | 28 | 1 | 27 | 1 | 1 | 0 |
| 18 | MF | (Russia) RUS | Sergei Shudrov | 24 | 0 | 24 | 0 | 0 | 0 |
| 17 | MF | (Russia) RUS | Oleg Aleynik | 22 | 1 | 21 | 1 | 1 | 0 |
| 7 | MF | (Russia) RUS | Vladimir Smirnov | 19 | 0 | 19 | 0 | 0 | 0 |
| 28 | MF | (Russia) RUS | Kirill Kochubei | 16 | 0 | 15 | 0 | 1 | 0 |
| 23 | MF | (Russia) RUS | Oleg Trifonov | 14 | 1 | 14 | 1 | 0 | 0 |
| 25 | MF | (Russia) RUS | Aleksandr Gaidukov | 13 | 1 | 12 | 1 | 1 | 0 |
| 19 | MF | (Russia) RUS | Sergei Mikhailov | 13 | 1 | 13 | 1 | 0 | 0 |
| 24 | MF | (Russia) RUS | Murad Ramazanov | 13 | 0 | 13 | 0 | 0 | 0 |
| 10 | FW | (Russia) RUS | Viktor Borisov | 30 | 2 | 29 | 2 | 1 | 0 |
| 11 | FW | (Malawi) MWI | Essau Kanyenda | 28 | 7 | 27 | 7 | 1 | 0 |
| 27 | FW | (Russia) RUS | Aleksandr Savin | 28 | 1 | 28 | 1 | 0 | 0 |
| 9 | FW | (Russia) RUS | Mikhail Markosov | 27 | 2 | 26 | 2 | 1 | 0 |
| 21 | FW | (Russia) RUS | Denis Dorozhkin | 16 | 2 | 16 | 2 | 0 | 0 |
| 12 | FW | (Russia) RUS | Mikhail Mysin | 12 | 0 | 12 | 0 | 0 | 0 |
Players who completed the season with other clubs:
| 24 | MF | (Russia) RUS | Roman Tuzovskiy | 19 | 1 | 19 | 1 | 0 | 0 |
| 22 | FW | (Russia) RUS | Yakov Ehrlich | 14 | 2 | 13 | 2 | 1 | 0 |

===== Top scorers =====
| Player | First Division | Russian Cup | Total |
|---|---|---|---|
| Essau Kanyenda | 7 | 0 | 7 |
| Aleksei Zhitnikov | 3 | 0 | 3 |
| Yakov Ehrlich | 2 | 0 | 2 |
| Mikhail Markosov | 2 | 0 | 2 |
| Viktor Borisov | 2 | 0 | 2 |
| Denis Dorozhkin | 2 | 0 | 2 |
| Aleksandr Gaidukov | 1 | 0 | 1 |
| Sergei Mikhailov | 1 | 0 | 1 |
| Oleg Aleynik | 1 | 0 | 1 |
| Roman Tuzovskiy | 1 | 0 | 1 |
| Dmitri Guz | 1 | 0 | 1 |
| Igor Shestakov | 1 | 0 | 1 |
| Ilya Ionov | 1 | 0 | 1 |
| Oleg Trifonov | 1 | 0 | 1 |
| Aleksandr Savin | 1 | 0 | 1 |
| Total | 27 | 0 | 27 |

===== Disciplinary record =====
| Player | First Division | | | Russian Cup | | | Total | | |
| Player | Booked | (yellow card) (red card) | Sent off (straight red) | Booked | (yellow card) (red card) | Sent off (straight red) | Booked | (yellow card) (red card) | Sent off (straight red) |
|---|---|---|---|---|---|---|---|---|---|
| Ilya Ionov | 8 | 0 | 0 | 0 | 0 | 0 | 8 | 0 | 0 |
| Nikolai Olenikov | 8 | 0 | 0 | 0 | 0 | 0 | 8 | 0 | 0 |
| Aleksei Yepifanov | 7 | 1 | 0 | 0 | 0 | 0 | 7 | 1 | 0 |
| Igor Shestakov | 7 | 0 | 0 | 0 | 0 | 0 | 7 | 0 | 0 |
| Essau Kanyenda | 5 | 0 | 0 | 1 | 0 | 0 | 6 | 0 | 0 |
| Sergei Shudrov | 5 | 2 | 0 | 0 | 0 | 0 | 5 | 2 | 0 |
| Murad Ramazanov | 5 | 0 | 0 | 0 | 0 | 0 | 5 | 0 | 0 |
| Sergei Mikhailov | 5 | 0 | 0 | 0 | 0 | 0 | 5 | 0 | 0 |
| Dmitri Guz | 4 | 0 | 1 | 0 | 0 | 0 | 4 | 0 | 1 |
| Viktor Borisov | 3 | 0 | 0 | 1 | 0 | 0 | 4 | 0 | 0 |
| Aleksei Zhitnikov | 3 | 0 | 0 | 0 | 0 | 0 | 3 | 0 | 0 |
| Yakov Ehrlich | 2 | 0 | 0 | 0 | 0 | 0 | 2 | 0 | 0 |
| Aleksandr Kukanos | 2 | 0 | 0 | 0 | 0 | 0 | 2 | 0 | 0 |
| Aleksandr Malyshev | 2 | 0 | 0 | 0 | 0 | 0 | 2 | 0 | 0 |
| Oleg Trifonov | 2 | 0 | 0 | 0 | 0 | 0 | 2 | 0 | 0 |
| Oleg Aleynik | 2 | 0 | 0 | 0 | 0 | 0 | 2 | 0 | 0 |
| Aleksandr Savin | 2 | 0 | 0 | 0 | 0 | 0 | 2 | 0 | 0 |
| Roman Tuzovskiy | 2 | 0 | 0 | 0 | 0 | 0 | 2 | 0 | 0 |
| Ruslan Beslaneyev | 1 | 0 | 0 | 1 | 0 | 0 | 2 | 0 | 0 |
| Kirill Kochubei | 1 | 1 | 0 | 0 | 0 | 0 | 1 | 1 | 0 |
| Pavel Mogilevskiy | 1 | 1 | 0 | 0 | 0 | 0 | 1 | 1 | 0 |
| Aleksandr Gaidukov | 1 | 0 | 0 | 0 | 0 | 0 | 1 | 0 | 0 |
| Mikhail Markosov | 1 | 0 | 0 | 0 | 0 | 0 | 1 | 0 | 0 |
| Mikhail Mysin | 1 | 0 | 0 | 0 | 0 | 0 | 1 | 0 | 0 |
| Denis Dorozhkin | 1 | 0 | 0 | 0 | 0 | 0 | 1 | 0 | 0 |
| Andrei Chichkin | 1 | 0 | 0 | 0 | 0 | 0 | 1 | 0 | 0 |
| Total | 82 | 5 | 1 | 3 | 0 | 0 | 85 | 5 | 1 |

=== Team statistics ===
==== Home attendance ====
| Date | Round | Attendance | Opposition | Stadium |
|---|---|---|---|---|
| 7 April 2010 | Round 3 | 6,000 | Irtysh Omsk | Tsentralniy (Volzhsky) |
| 10 April 2010 | Round 4 | 3,500 | Ural Ekaterinburg | Tsentralniy (Volzhsky) |
| 29 April 2010 | Round 7 | 6,000 | Dynamo Bryansk | Tsentralniy (Volgograd) |
| 2 May 2010 | Round 8 | 6,000 | Shinnik Yaroslavl | Tsentralniy (Volgograd) |
| 21 May 2010 | Round 11 | 5,000 | Nizhny Novgorod | Tsentralniy (Volgograd) |
| 24 May 2010 | Round 12 | 2,500 | Mordovia Saransk | Tsentralniy (Volgograd) |
| 23 June 2010 | Round 17 | 3,000 | Luch-Energiya Vladivostok | Tsentralniy (Volgograd) |
| 26 June 2010 | Round 18 | 2,000 | SKA-Energiya Khabarovsk | Tsentralniy (Volgograd) |
| 1 July 2010 | Russian Cup | 2,500 | Salyut Belgorod | Tsentralniy (Volgograd) |
| 30 July 2010 | Round 21 | 2 500 | Volga Nizhny Novgorod | Tsentralniy (Volgograd) |
| 2 August 2010 | Round 22 | 1,500 | KAMAZ Naberezhnye Chelny | Tsentralniy (Volgograd) |
| 21 August 2010 | Round 25 | 3,000 | Dynamo Saint Petersburg | Tsentralniy (Volgograd) |
| 24 August 2010 | Round 26 | 2,500 | Baltika Kaliningrad | Tsentralniy (Volgograd) |
| 11 September 2010 | Round 29 | 4,500 | Krasnodar | Tsentralniy (Volgograd) |
| 14 September 2010 | Round 30 | 5,000 | Zhemchuzhina-Sochi | Tsentralniy (Volgograd) |
| 6 October 2010 | Round 34 | 3,000 | Volgar-Gazprom Astrakhan | Tsentralniy (Volgograd) |
| 14 October 2010 | Round 35 | 3,000 | Avangard Kursk | Tsentralniy (Volgograd) |
| 17 October 2010 | Round 36 | 3,100 | Salyut Belgorod | Tsentralniy (Volgograd) |
| 3 November 2010 | Round 39 | 2,000 | Kuban Krasnodar | Tsentralniy (Volgograd) |
| 6 November 2010 | Round 40 | 3,000 | Khimki | Tsentralniy (Volgograd) |
| Total | | 69,600 | | |
| Average | | 3,480 | | |

==== General statistics ====
| Tournament | Pld | W | D | L | GF | GA | GD | YC | 2YC | RC | Pts |
|---|---|---|---|---|---|---|---|---|---|---|---|
| First Division | 38 | 9 | 7 | 22 | 27 | 64 | −37 | 82 | 5 | 1 | 34/114 (29,8 %) |
| Russian Cup | 1 | 0 | 0 | 1 | 0 | 1 | −1 | 3 | 0 | 0 | 0/3 (0%) |
| Total | 39 | 9 | 7 | 23 | 27 | 65 | −38 | 85 | 5 | 1 | 34/117 (29,1 %) |
