= Andrei Yevdokhin =

Russian footballer

Personal information
- Full name: Andrei Vladimirovich Yevdokhin
- Date of birth: 22 May 1982 (age 44)
- Place of birth: Volgograd, Russian SFSR
- Height: 1.98 m (6 ft 6 in)
- Position: Goalkeeper

Senior career*
Years	Team	Apps	(Gls)
2000	FC Rotor-2 Volgograd	12	(0)
2001–2002	FC Rotor Volgograd	0	(0)
2004	FC Rotor-2 Volgograd	17	(0)
2004	FC Rotor Volgograd	0	(0)
2005	FC Rotor-2 Volgograd	19	(0)
2006	FC Oryol	5	(0)
2006–2007	FC Volga Nizhny Novgorod	21	(0)
2008	FC Avangard Kursk	5	(0)
2009	FC Volgograd	3	(0)
2010	FC Torpedo Vladimir	17	(0)
2011	FC Petrotrest Saint Petersburg	9	(0)
2012	FC Gornyak Uchaly	7	(0)
2012	FC Olimpia Volgograd	2	(0)
2014	FC Volga Tver	4	(0)
- * Club domestic league appearances and goals

Andrei Vladimirovich Yevdokhin (Russian: Андрей Владимирович Евдохин; born 22 May 1982) is a former Russian professional football player.

== Club career ==
He played in the Russian Football National League for FC Oryol in 2006.

== Honours ==
- Russian Second Division Zone South best goalkeeper: 2005.
