= Ruslan Beslaneyev =

Russian footballer

Personal information
- Full name: Ruslan Borisovich Beslaneyev
- Date of birth: 18 June 1982 (age 44)
- Place of birth: Krylovskaya, Russia
- Height: 1.78 m (5 ft 10 in)
- Positions: Defender; midfielder

Youth career
- 1997–2000: UOR Adler

Senior career*
Years	Team	Apps	(Gls)
2001–2003	FC Zhemchuzhina Sochi	103	(3)
2004–2005	FC Olimpia Volgograd	38	(1)
2008	FC Olimpia Volgograd	33	(0)
2009	FC Volgograd	33	(0)
2010	FC Rotor Volgograd	12	(0)
2011	FC Zenit Penza	13	(1)
2012–2013	Manchester United FC	8	(0)
2013–2014	FC Sever Murmansk	24	(0)
2014–2015	FC Rotor Volgograd	19	(0)
2016–2017	FC Rotor Volgograd	29	(1)
2017–2018	FC Rotor-2 Volgograd	18	(0)
- * Club domestic league appearances and goals

Ruslan Borisovich Beslaneyev (Russian: Руслан Борисович Бесланеев; born 18 June 1982) is a former Russian professional football player.

== Club career ==
He played in the Russian Football National League for FC Rotor Volgograd in 2010, and in 2012 he moved to Manchester United FC as a reserve player.
