= Vasili Chernov =

Russian footballer

Personal information
- Full name: Vasili Alekseyevich Chernov
- Date of birth: 26 May 1982 (age 44)
- Place of birth: Kamyshin, Russian SFSR
- Height: 1.74 m (5 ft 8 1/2 in)
- Position: Defender

Youth career
- SDYuSShOR-2 Kamyshin
- FC Olimpia Volgograd

Senior career*
Years	Team	Apps	(Gls)
1998–1999	FC Olimpia Volgograd (amateur)		
2000–2007	FC Olimpia Volgograd	199	(10)
2008	FC Mordovia Saransk	23	(1)
2009	FC Volgograd	29	(1)
2010	FC Rotor Volgograd	4	(0)
2011	FC Tsement Mikhaylovka (amateur)		
2011	FC Mashuk-KMV Pyatigorsk	5	(0)
- * Club domestic league appearances and goals

Vasili Alekseyevich Chernov (Russian: Василий Алексеевич Чернов; born 26 May 1982) is a former Russian professional football player.

== Club career ==
He played in the Russian Football National League for FC Rotor Volgograd in 2010.
