= Vladimir Smirnov (footballer) =

Russian footballer

Personal information
- Full name: Vladimir Anatolyevich Smirnov
- Date of birth: 2 August 1977 (age 49)
- Place of birth: Volgograd, Russia
- Height: 1.78 m (5 ft 10 in)
- Positions: Midfielder; forward

Senior career*
Years	Team	Apps	(Gls)
1992	FC Tekstilshchik-d Kamyshin	9	(1)
1994–1997	FC Rotor-d Volgograd	87	(7)
1997–2004	FC Rotor Volgograd	181	(0)
1998–2000	FC Rotor-2 Volgograd	13	(1)
2005	FC Fakel Voronezh	21	(0)
2005–2006	FC Sodovik Sterlitamak	45	(3)
2007	FC Ural Yekaterinburg	25	(0)
2008	FC Avangard Kursk	20	(0)
2009	FC Volgograd	12	(0)
2010	FC Rotor Volgograd	19	(0)
2011	FC Dynamo Kostroma	25	(2)
2012–2014	FC Sever Murmansk	65	(0)
2014	FC Volga Tver	20	(0)

International career
1998–1999	Russia U21	13	(0)
- * Club domestic league appearances and goals

Vladimir Anatolyevich Smirnov (Russian: Владимир Анатольевич Смирнов; born 2 August 1977) is a Russian former professional footballer.

== Club career ==
He made his debut in the Russian Premier League in 1997 for FC Rotor Volgograd.

== European club competitions ==
With FC Rotor Volgograd.

- UEFA Cup 1997–98: 1 game.
- UEFA Cup 1998–99: 1 game.
