= Roman Tuzovskiy =

Russian footballer

Personal information
- Full name: Roman Sergeyevich Tuzovskiy
- Date of birth: 3 January 1985 (age 41)
- Place of birth: Barnaul, Russian SFSR
- Height: 1.76 m (5 ft 9 in)
- Positions: Midfielder; forward

Senior career*
Years	Team	Apps	(Gls)
2004–2005	FC Rotor-2 Volgograd	42	(1)
2006	FC Fakel Voronezh	25	(0)
2007	FC Sodovik Sterlitamak	14	(0)
2007	FC Dynamo Barnaul	7	(1)
2008	FC Mordovia Saransk	24	(1)
2009	FC Volgograd	33	(10)
2010	FC Rotor Volgograd	19	(1)
2010–2014	FC Volgar Astrakhan	84	(7)
2014	FC Volga Ulyanovsk	13	(1)
2015	FC Astrakhan	12	(3)
2016–2017	FC Dynamo Barnaul	20	(6)
2018	FC Novokuznetsk (amateur)		
2019	FC Dynamo Barnaul	3	(0)
- * Club domestic league appearances and goals

Roman Sergeyevich Tuzovskiy (Russian: Роман Серге́евич Тузо́вский; born 3 January 1985) is a Russian former professional football player.

== Club career ==
He played 5 seasons in the Russian Football National League for 4 different clubs.
