= Evald Frolov =

Russian footballer and manager

Personal information
- Full name: Evald Brunovich Frolov
- Date of birth: 9 March 1962 (age 64)
- Place of birth: Volzhsky, Russian SFSR
- Position: Goalkeeper

Senior career*
Years	Team	Apps	(Gls)
1992	FC Metallurg Volzhsky		

Managerial career
- 1998: FC Torpedo Volzhsky (administrator)
- 1999–2011: FC Energiya Volzhsky (director)
- 2012–2014: FC Urozhay Yelan
- 2015–2016: FC Rotor Volgograd
- 2016: FC Rotor-2 Volgograd (assistant)
- 2016–2017: FC Rotor Volgograd (assistant)
- 2017: FC Rotor Volgograd (caretaker)
- 2017: FC Rotor-2 Volgograd
- * Club domestic league appearances and goals

Evald Brunovich Frolov (Russian: Эвальд Брунович Фролов; born 9 March 1962) is a Russian football manager and a former player.

== Personal life ==
His son Dainis Frolov is a footballer.
