= Gaidukov =

Gaidukov (masculine, Russian: Гайдуков) or Gaidukova (feminine, Russian: Гайдукова) is a Russian surname. Notable people with the surname include:

- Aleksandr Gaidukov (born 1979), Russian footballer
- Alexandr Gaidukov (water polo) (born 1974), Russian water polo player
- Maksim Gaidukov (born 1995), Russian footballer
