= Zhitnikov =

Zhitnikov (Russian: Житников) is a Russian surname, its female form is Zhitnikova. 'Zhito' means 'rye'. Notable people with the surname include:

- Aleksei Zhitnikov (born 1984), Russian footballer
- Dmitry Zhitnikov (born 1989), Russian handball player
