= Pavel Mogilevskiy =

Russian footballer and coach

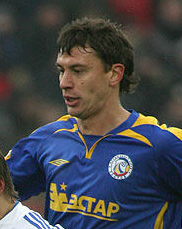

Personal information
- Full name: Pavel Viktorovich Mogilevskiy
- Date of birth: 17 April 1980 (age 46)
- Place of birth: Volgograd, Soviet Union
- Height: 1.84 m (6 ft 0 in)
- Position: Defender

Team information
- Current team: FC Orenburg (academy coach)

Youth career
- FC Rotor Volgograd

Senior career*
Years	Team	Apps	(Gls)
1997–2000	FC Rotor-2 Volgograd	55	(1)
2000–2004	FC Rotor Volgograd	78	(0)
2005	FC Tom Tomsk	5	(0)
2006	FC Sodovik Sterlitamak	36	(0)
2007–2008	FC Rostov	42	(0)
2009	FC Volga Nizhny Novgorod	16	(0)
2010	FC Baltika Kaliningrad	15	(0)
2010	FC Rotor Volgograd	14	(0)
2011–2014	FC Luch-Energiya Vladivostok	78	(2)
2014–2015	FC Fakel Voronezh	32	(0)

Managerial career
- 2016: FC Fakel Voronezh (assistant)
- 2017–2019: FC Rotor Volgograd (assistant)
- 2020–2021: FC Kuban Krasnodar
- 2021–2022: FC Novosibirsk
- 2022–2023: FC Forte Taganrog
- 2023–: FC Orenburg (academy)
- * Club domestic league appearances and goals

Pavel Viktorovich Mogilevskiy (Russian: Павел Викторович Могилевский; born 17 April 1980) is a Russian professional football coach and a former player. He is a coach at the academy of FC Orenburg.

== Playing career ==
He made his debut in the Russian Premier League in 2000 for FC Rotor Volgograd.
