= Volgograd Oblast Football Championship =

The Volgograd Oblast Football Championship (Чемпионат Волгоградской области по футболу) is an independent soccer league for teams in the Volgograd Oblast region of southern Russia. The league is nominally at the fifth level of the Russian football system, but there is no automatic promotion and relegation between it and the fourth-level Amateur Football League. Teams from the Amateur Football League can apply to join the Volgograd Oblast Championship and vice versa.

The league is currently home to former professional teams FC Tekstilshchik Kamyshin and FC Olimpia Volgograd, and a reserve team from the area's biggest club Rotor Volgograd. Past winners include FC Zvezda Gorodishche, FC Avangard Kamyshin and FC Tsement Mikhaylovka.

Matches are played between April and October.

== 2015 final table ==
Pos	Team	Pld	W	D	L	Pts
1	BIO Svetly Yar	22	18	1	3	55
2	Urozhai Yelan	22	18	1	3	55
3	FC Olimpia Volgograd	22	15	2	5	47
4	Alpha Volgograd	22	15	0	7	45
5	Dinamo Nikolayevsk	22	14	2	6	44
6	Volgograd	22	11	3	8	36
7	FC Tekstilshchik Kamyshin	22	10	4	8	34
8	CSP Volgograd	22	7	3	12	24
9	Rotor-2 Volgograd	22	4	3	15	15
10	Pyeresvyet Mikhaylovka	21	3	2	16	11
11	VKOR Volgograd	21	1	4	16	7
12	SDYuSShOR-4 Volzhskiy	22	2	1	19	7
