= Sergei Mikhailov (footballer, born 1983) =

Russian footballer

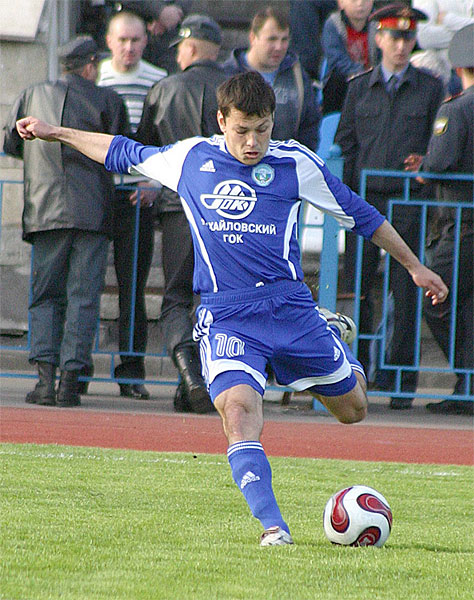

Personal information
- Full name: Sergei Valeryevich Mikhailov
- Date of birth: 23 September 1983 (age 43)
- Place of birth: Volgograd, Russian SFSR
- Height: 1.76 m (5 ft 9 in)
- Position: Midfielder

Senior career*
Years	Team	Apps	(Gls)
2000	FC Rotor-2 Volgograd	18	(0)
2001–2004	FC Rotor Volgograd	17	(0)
2005	FC Rotor-2 Volgograd	13	(0)
2006	FC Oryol	20	(1)
2006	FC Vityaz Podolsk	7	(0)
2007	FC Nosta Novotroitsk	19	(0)
2008–2010	FC Avangard Kursk	81	(18)
2010	FC Rotor Volgograd	13	(1)
2011	FC Metallurg Lipetsk	28	(3)
2012	FC Sever Murmansk	21	(2)
2013	FC Avangard Kursk	6	(0)
2013–2014	FC Metallurg Lipetsk	23	(3)
- * Club domestic league appearances and goals

Sergei Valeryevich Mikhailov (Russian: Серге́й Валерьевич Михайлов; born 23 September 1983) is a Russian former professional footballer.

== Club career ==
He made his debut in the Russian Premier League in 2001 for FC Rotor Volgograd.
