= Mikhail Mysin =

Russian footballer and coach

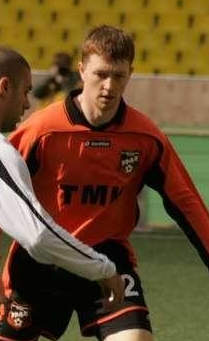
- Mikhail Mysin playing for FC Ural in 2008

Personal information
- Full name: Mikhail Viktorovich Mysin
- Date of birth: 22 May 1979 (age 47)
- Place of birth: Volgograd, Soviet Union
- Height: 1.86 m (6 ft 1 in)
- Position: Forward

Team information
- Current team: FC Rotor Volgograd (consulting coach)

Youth career
- FC Rotor Volgograd

Senior career*
Years	Team	Apps	(Gls)
1997–2004	FC Rotor Volgograd	85	(10)
2005–2008	FC Ural Sverdlovsk Oblast	148	(52)
2009	FC Alania Vladikavkaz	20	(2)
2009–2010	FC Volga Nizhny Novgorod	24	(7)
2010	→ FC Rotor Volgograd (loan)	12	(0)
2011	FC SKA-Energiya Khabarovsk	9	(1)
2011–2012	FC Ufa	20	(6)
2012–2013	FC Jūrmala	13	(6)
2013	FC Sever Murmansk	7	(0)

International career
2000	Russia U-21	1	(0)

Managerial career
- 2017–2019: FC Rotor-2 Volgograd (assistant)
- 2021–2022: FC Rotor Volgograd (analyst)
- 2025–: FC Rotor Volgograd (consulting)
- * Club domestic league appearances and goals

Mikhail Viktorovich Mysin (Russian: Михаил Викторович Мысин; born 22 May 1979) is a Russian professional football coach and a former player. He is a consulting coach with FC Rotor Volgograd.

== Club career ==
He made his debut in the Russian Premier League in 1997 for FC Rotor Volgograd, and played one game for them in the UEFA Cup 1997–98.

== Honours ==
- Russian Premier League runner-up: 1997.
