= Aleksandr Gaidukov =

Russian footballer

Personal information
- Full name: Aleksandr Aleksandrovich Gaidukov
- Date of birth: 25 January 1979 (age 47)
- Height: 1.69 m (5 ft 6 1/2 in)
- Position: Midfielder

Senior career*
| Years | Team | Apps | (Gls) |
| 1996–1997 | FC Rotor Volgograd (reserves) | 56 | (2) |
| 1998–2000 | FC Rotor-2 Volgograd | 92 | (5) |
| 2000–2004 | FC Rotor Volgograd | 65 | (0) |
| 2005–2008 | FC Mordovia Saransk | 119 | (5) |
| 2009 | FC Volgograd | 31 | (5) |
| 2010 | FC Rotor Volgograd | 12 | (1) |
| 2011–2012 | FC Energiya Volzhsky | 29 | (1) |
- * Club domestic league appearances and goals

Aleksandr Aleksandrovich Gaidukov (Russian: Александр Александрович Гайдуков; born 25 January 1979) is a former Russian professional footballer. He made his debut in the Russian Premier League in 2000 for FC Rotor Volgograd.
