= Volgograd (disambiguation) =

Volgograd is a city in Russia.

Volgograd may also refer to:

- Volgograd Oblast, a federal subject of Russia
- Volgograd International Airport, an airport in Volgograd Oblast, Russia
- Volgograd Reservoir, a fresh water reservoir in Volgograd and Saratov Oblasts, Russia
- FC Volgograd, an association football club based in Volgograd, Russia
