= Yakov Erlikh =

Russian footballer (born 1988)

Personal information
- Full name: Yakov Nikolayevich Erlikh
- Date of birth: 3 June 1988 (age 38)
- Place of birth: Barnaul, Russian SFSR
- Height: 1.85 m (6 ft 1 in)
- Position: Striker

Youth career
- FC Dynamo Barnaul

Senior career*
Years	Team	Apps	(Gls)
2006	FC Dynamo Barnaul	14	(0)
2008–2009	FC Rostov	5	(1)
2008	→ FC Metallurg Lipetsk (loan)	12	(2)
2009	→ FC Volgograd (loan)	26	(4)
2010–2011	FC Rotor Volgograd	25	(4)
2010	→ FC Gubkin (loan)	11	(3)
2011–2012	FC Mostovik-Primorye Ussuriysk	15	(6)
2012	FC Amur-2010 Blagoveshchensk	20	(2)
2013	FC Sokol Saratov	9	(0)
2013–2014	FC Sakhalin Yuzhno-Sakhalinsk	16	(5)
2015	FC Dynamo Barnaul	9	(0)
2016	FC DSI Komsomolsk-na-Amure		
2017	FC Ocean Kerch		
2017	FC Afips Afipsky	2	(0)
2017–2018	FC Krymteplytsia Molodizhne		
2018–2020	FC Ocean Kerch		
2020	FC Kafa Feodosia		

Managerial career
- 2021–2022: FC Ufa (conditioning)
- 2022–2024: FC Rotor Volgograd (conditioning)
- * Club domestic league appearances and goals

Yakov Nikolayevich Erlikh (Russian: Яков Николаевич Эрлих; born 3 June 1988) is a Russian professional football coach and a former player.

== Career ==
Erlikh made his Russian Football National League debut for FC Rostov on 25 May 2008 in a game against FC Zvezda Irkutsk.

In July 2008, Erlikh and fellow Russian Jew, Boris Rotenberg, joined Israeli club Hapoel Petah Tikva on trial. The club was interested in both their services since they are Jewish and would not count as foreigners.

In 2010 and 2012–2013 he played for Rotor Volgograd, and in 2014–2016 he played for FC Sakhalin Yuzhno-Sakhalinsk.

He played for FC Ocean Kerch.

== See also ==
- List of select Jewish football (association; soccer) players
