= Aleksandr Malyshev =

Russian footballer and coach

Personal information
- Full name: Aleksandr Anatolyevich Malyshev
- Date of birth: 8 January 1980 (age 46)
- Place of birth: Yaroslavl, Russia, Soviet Union
- Height: 1.90 m (6 ft 3 in)
- Position: Goalkeeper

Team information
- Current team: FC Shinnik Yaroslavl (GK coach)

Senior career*
Years	Team	Apps	(Gls)
1999	FC Neftyanik Yaroslavl	36	(0)
2000	FC Shinnik Yaroslavl	0	(0)
2000–2001	FC Neftyanik Yaroslavl	44	(0)
2002–2003	FC Shinnik Yaroslavl	0	(0)
2003	FC Dynamo Vologda	36	(0)
2004	FC Shinnik Yaroslavl	7	(0)
2005	FC Ural Yekaterinburg	28	(0)
2006–2007	FC Shinnik Yaroslavl	10	(0)
2008	FC Ural Yekaterinburg	9	(0)
2009	FC Volgograd	32	(0)
2010–2013	FC Rotor Volgograd	41	(0)
2013–2018	FC Shinnik Yaroslavl	39	(0)

Managerial career
- 2018–2021: FC Shinnik Yaroslavl (GK coach)
- 2022–2023: FC Volgar Astrakhan (GK coach)
- 2024–: FC Shinnik Yaroslavl (GK coach)
- * Club domestic league appearances and goals

Aleksandr Anatolyevich Malyshev (Russian: Александр Анатольевич Малышев; born 8 January 1980) is a Russian professional football coach and a former player. He is the goalkeeping coach with FC Shinnik Yaroslavl.

== Club career ==
He made his debut in the Russian Premier League in 2004 for FC Shinnik Yaroslavl and played 3 games in the UEFA Intertoto Cup 2004 for them.
