= Oleg Trifonov =

Russian footballer

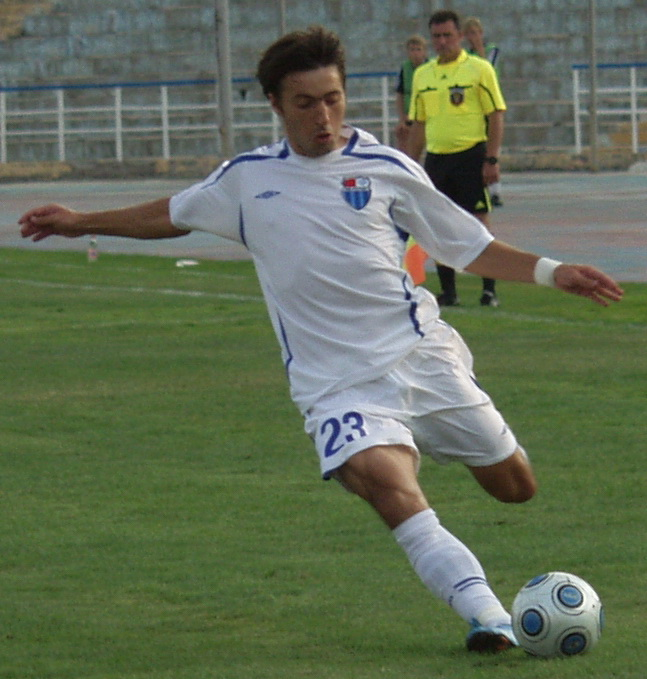

Personal information
- Full name: Oleg Vyacheslavovich Trifonov
- Date of birth: 9 June 1981 (age 45)
- Place of birth: Sochi, Russia, Soviet Union
- Height: 1.85 m (6 ft 1 in)
- Position: Midfielder

Youth career
- FC Dynamo Stavropol

Senior career*
Years	Team	Apps	(Gls)
1998–1999	FC Dynamo Stavropol	7	(1)
2000	FC Rotor-2 Volgograd	23	(2)
2000–2004	FC Rotor Volgograd	99	(9)
2005	FC Zenit St. Petersburg	9	(0)
2005–2008	→ FC Kuban Krasnodar (loan)	15	(2)
2007	→ FC Krylia Sovetov Samara (loan)	8	(1)
2008	→ FC Kuban Krasnodar (loan)	7	(1)
2008	FC Sportakademklub Moscow	7	(0)
2009–2010	FC Volga Nizhny Novgorod	51	(5)
2010	→ FC Rotor Volgograd (loan)	14	(1)
2011	FC Sokol Saratov	10	(1)
2011	FC Rotor Volgograd	11	(1)
2012–2013	FC Rus Saint Petersburg	18	(2)
2013	FC Angusht Nazran	1	(0)

International career
2001–2003	Russia U-21	6	(1)
- * Club domestic league appearances and goals

Oleg Vyacheslavovich Trifonov (Russian: Олег Вячеславович Трифонов; born 9 June 1981) is a Russian former professional footballer.

== Club career ==
He made his debut in the Russian Premier League in 2000 for FC Rotor Volgograd. He played 3 games in the UEFA Cup 2005–06 for FC Zenit St. Petersburg.
