= Sergei Shudrov =

Russian footballer

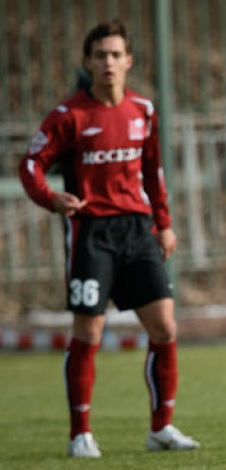
- Sergei Shudrov in 2008

Personal information
- Full name: Sergei Aleksandrovich Shudrov
- Date of birth: 11 August 1989 (age 37)
- Place of birth: Neryungri, Russian SFSR
- Height: 1.74 m (5 ft 9 in)
- Positions: Defender; midfielder

Senior career*
Years	Team	Apps	(Gls)
2006–2007	FC Rostov	2	(0)
2008–2009	FC Moscow	0	(0)
2009	→ FC SKA-Energiya Khabarovsk (loan)	5	(0)
2010–2012	FC Rotor Volgograd	50	(0)
2012	FC Sever Murmansk	15	(1)
2013	FC Biolog-Novokubansk Progress	10	(0)
2013–2014	FC SKVO Rostov-on-Don	18	(1)
2014–2015	FC Angusht Nazran	29	(0)
2016–2017	FC Rotor Volgograd	16	(0)
- * Club domestic league appearances and goals

Sergei Aleksandrovich Shudrov (Russian: Серге́й Александрович Шудров; born 11 August 1989) is a Russian former professional footballer.

== Club career ==
He made his professional debut in the Russian Premier League in 2007 for FC Rostov.
