= Aleksandr Kukanos =

Russian footballer

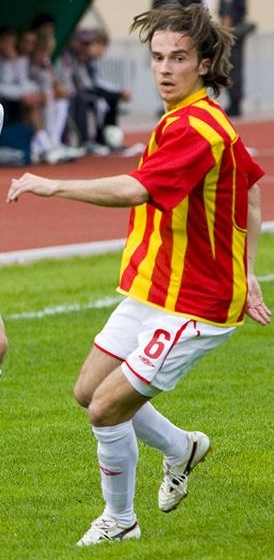

Personal information
- Full name: Aleksandr Vladimirovich Kukanos
- Date of birth: 30 May 1983 (age 43)
- Place of birth: Moscow, Soviet Union
- Height: 1.77 m (5 ft 9 1/2 in)
- Position: Defender

Youth career
- –2000: FC Dynamo Moscow

Senior career*
Years	Team	Apps	(Gls)
2001	FC Dynamo Moscow	0	(0)
2002	FC Khimki	0	(0)
2003	FC Rubin Kazan	0	(0)
2004–2005	FC Rubin-2 Kazan	62	(0)
2006–2008	FC Alania Vladikavkaz	94	(0)
2009–2010	FC KAMAZ Naberezhnye Chelny	30	(0)
2010	FC Rotor Volgograd	10	(0)
2011	FC Baltika Kaliningrad	18	(0)
2012	Skonto Riga	21	(1)
2013	FC Khimki	1	(0)
2014	FC Khimki	3	(0)
- * Club domestic league appearances and goals

Aleksandr Vladimirovich Kukanos (Russian: Александр Владимирович Куканос; born 30 May 1985) is a former Russian footballer.

== Club career ==
He made his Russian Football National League debut for FC Alania Vladikavkaz on 28 March 2007 in a game against FC SKA-Energiya Khabarovsk.
