= Andrei Bochkov =

Russian footballer

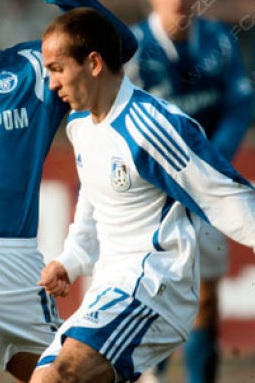
- Andrei Bochkov in 2008

Personal information
- Full name: Andrei Mikhailovich Bochkov
- Date of birth: 13 January 1982 (age 44)
- Place of birth: Volgograd, Russian SFSR
- Height: 1.74 m (5 ft 8 1/2 in)
- Position: Midfielder

Youth career
- –2000: FC Olimpia Volgograd

Senior career*
Years	Team	Apps	(Gls)
2000–2002	FC Olimpia Volgograd	78	(7)
2003–2004	FC Uralan Elista	41	(3)
2004–2007	FC Rostov	80	(3)
2008–2009	FC Shinnik Yaroslavl	53	(1)
2010	FC Luch-Energiya Vladivostok	34	(3)
2011–2015	FC Ural Sverdlovsk Oblast	87	(3)
2014–2015	→ FC Tosno (loan)	25	(0)
2015–2016	FC Tosno	21	(0)
2016	FC Sakhalin Yuzhno-Sakhalinsk	11	(1)
2017	FC Sochi	12	(1)
2017	FC Volgar Astrakhan	18	(0)
2018	FC Neftekhimik Nizhnekamsk	15	(1)
- * Club domestic league appearances and goals

Andrei Mikhailovich Bochkov (Russian: Андрей Михайлович Бочков; born 13 January 1982) is a former Russian footballer.
