= Aleksei Yepifanov =

Russian footballer

Personal information
- Full name: Aleksei Yuryevich Yepifanov
- Date of birth: 21 July 1983 (age 43)
- Height: 1.85 m (6 ft 1 in)
- Position: Defender

Youth career
- FC Rotor Volgograd

Senior career*
Years	Team	Apps	(Gls)
2000–2004	FC Rotor Volgograd (reserves)	91	(0)
2002–2004	FC Rotor Volgograd	18	(0)
2005	FC Ural Yekaterinburg	3	(0)
2005	FC Kuban Krasnodar	4	(0)
2006	FC Ural Yekaterinburg	3	(0)
2006	FC Sodovik Sterlitamak	20	(0)
2007	FC Baltika Kaliningrad	37	(3)
2008	FC Zvezda Irkutsk	25	(3)
2008–2009	FC SKA-Energiya Khabarovsk	27	(0)
2009	FC Amkar Perm	0	(0)
2010	FC Rotor Volgograd	27	(0)
2011	FC Avangard Kursk	24	(0)
2012	FC Sever Murmansk	9	(0)
2012–2013	FC Torpedo Moscow	6	(0)
2014	FK Banga Gargždai	34	(1)
2015–2016	FK Atlantas	49	(0)
2017	JK Sillamäe Kalev	23	(0)
- * Club domestic league appearances and goals

Aleksei Yuryevich Yepifanov (Russian: Алексей Юрьевич Епифанов; born 21 July 1983) is a former Russian professional footballer. He made his debut in the Russian Premier League in 2002 for FC Rotor Volgograd where he played for two seasons.
