= Igor Shestakov =

Russian footballer

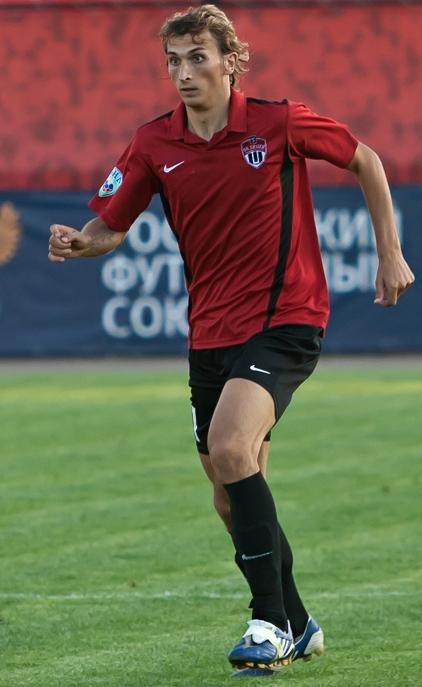
- Shestakov in 2011

Personal information
- Full name: Igor Sergeyevich Shestakov
- Date of birth: 31 December 1984 (age 41)
- Place of birth: Moscow, Russian SFSR
- Height: 1.83 m (6 ft 0 in)
- Position: Defender

Senior career*
Years	Team	Apps	(Gls)
2001–2006	FC Saturn Ramenskoye	0	(0)
2004–2005	→ FC Gazovik Orenburg (loan)	33	(2)
2006–2009	FC Sibir Novosibirsk	99	(5)
2009	→ FC Chernomorets Novorossiysk (loan)	14	(0)
2010	FC Rotor Volgograd	27	(1)
2011–2012	FC Khimki	29	(2)
2012–2013	FC Oka Stupino (amateur)		
2013–2014	FC Khimki	14	(0)
2014–2015	FC Saturn Ramenskoye	25	(7)
2015	FC Domodedovo Moscow	8	(1)
2016	FC Saturn Ramenskoye	0	(0)
2016	FC Odintsovo		
2017–2020	FC Peresvet Podolsk (amateur)		
2022–2023	FC Peresvet Domodedovo	24	(1)
- * Club domestic league appearances and goals

Igor Sergeyevich Shestakov (Russian: Игорь Серге́евич Шестаков; born 31 December 1984) is a Russian former professional footballer.

== Club career ==
He played 6 seasons in the Russian Football National League for 4 different teams.
