= Mikhail Markosov =

Armenian-Russian footballer

Personal information
- Full name: Mikhail Sergeyi Markosov
- Date of birth: 29 June 1985 (age 41)
- Place of birth: Budyonnovsk, Stavropol Krai, Russian SFSR
- Height: 1.83 m (6 ft 0 in)
- Position: Striker

Senior career*
| Years | Team | Apps | (Gls) |
| 2004–2006 | FC Zhemchuzhina Budyonnovsk | 23 | (2) |
| 2006–2007 | FC Kavkaztransgaz Ryzdvyany | 24 | (8) |
| 2007–2009 | FC SKA Rostov-on-Don | 23 | (0) |
| 2008 | → FC Dynamo Stavropol (loan) | 30 | (27) |
| 2009–2010 | FC Stavropol | 15 | (10) |
| 2010–2011 | FC Rotor Volgograd | 26 | (2) |
| 2011 | FC Dynamo Stavropol | 10 | (10) |
| 2011–2013 | FC Ufa | 46 | (14) |
| 2013–2015 | FC Sibir Novosibirsk | 54 | (9) |
| 2015 | FC Khimki | 17 | (11) |
| 2016 | FC Solyaris Moscow | 10 | (4) |
| 2016–2017 | FC Dynamo Saint Petersburg | 40 | (16) |
| 2018 | FC Dynamo Stavropol | 12 | (5) |
| 2019 | FC Kuban Krasnodar (amateur) | | |
| 2019 | FC Urozhay Krasnodar | 16 | (1) |
- * Club domestic league appearances and goals

Mikhail Sergeyi Markosov (Russian: Михаил Серге́евич Маркосов; born 29 June 1985) is an Armenian-Russian former football player who played as a striker.

== Club career ==
Markosov has played for several Russian clubs in the Russian Second Division and Russian First Division. His professional career began in 2004 in FC Zhemchuzhina Budyonnovsk. He then moved to FC Kavkaztransgaz Ryzdvyany. In 2007, he made his debut in the Russian First Division in FC SKA Rostov-on-Don. Markosov began the 2008 season in FC Dynamo Stavropol. He was the top goalscorer in the 2008 Russian Second Division South Zone, scoring 27 goals, a feat no one in the entire Second Division surpassed. In the 2010 season, he played for FC Rotor Volgograd and came back to FC Dynamo Stavropol the next season. Scoring 10 goals in his first 10 matches for Dynamo, Markosov was transferred in the summer transfer window of the 2011–12 season to FC Ufa. From April until June 2019 Markosov played for FC Kuban Krasnodar, scored 7 goals in 11 matches.

== International career ==
Markosov was called up to the Armenia national football team for a friendly match against Luxembourg on 5 February 2013 in Valence, France. However, he did not make an appearance for the team.

== Personal life ==
Mikhail is married to his wife Nastya.

== Honours ==
=== Club ===
FC Dynamo Stavropol

- Russian Second Division Zone South Top Goalscorer: 2008 (27 goals)

FC Khimki/FC Solyaris Moscow

- Russian Professional Football League Zone West Top Goalscorer and Best Player: 2015–16 (13 goals).
