= Nikolai Olenikov =

Russian footballer

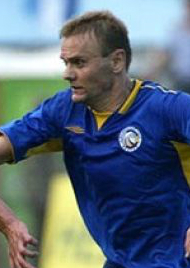

Personal information
- Full name: Nikolai Vladimirovich Olenikov
- Date of birth: 24 May 1975 (age 51)
- Place of birth: Pravokumskoye, Russian SFSR
- Height: 1.90 m (6 ft 3 in)
- Position: Defender

Team information
- Current team: FC Rotor Volgograd (U19 assistant coach)

Youth career
- FC Dynamo Stavropol

Senior career*
Years	Team	Apps	(Gls)
1992	FC Astrateks Astrakhan	3	(0)
1992	FC Beshtau Lermontov	2	(0)
1993	FC Nart Cherkessk	4	(0)
1994	FC Lokomotiv Mineralnye Vody	26	(1)
1995–1996	FC Dynamo Stavropol	29	(0)
1997–2004	FC Rotor Volgograd	206	(12)
2005–2006	FC Rostov	31	(1)
2007–2008	FC Sibir Novosibirsk	51	(4)
2008–2009	FC SKA-Energia Khabarovsk	46	(0)
2010–2013	FC Rotor Volgograd	93	(4)
2013–2014	FC Sever Murmansk	1	(0)
2016–2017	FC Rotor Volgograd	20	(2)
2017–2018	FC Rotor-2 Volgograd	20	(0)

International career
2002	Russia	1	(0)

Managerial career
- 2019–: FC Rotor Volgograd (U19 assistant)
- * Club domestic league appearances and goals

Nikolai Vladimirovich Olenikov (Russian: Николай Владимирович Олеников; born 24 May 1975) is a Russian association football coach and a former defender. He is an assistant coach with the Under-19 squad of FC Rotor Volgograd.

== Honours ==
- Russian Premier League runner-up: 1997.

== International career ==
Olenikov made his debut for Russia on 21 August 2002 in a friendly against Sweden.

== European club competitions ==
- 1997–98 UEFA Cup with FC Rotor Volgograd: 6 games.
- 1998–99 UEFA Cup with FC Rotor Volgograd: 2 games.
