= Denis Dorozhkin =

Russian professional football player

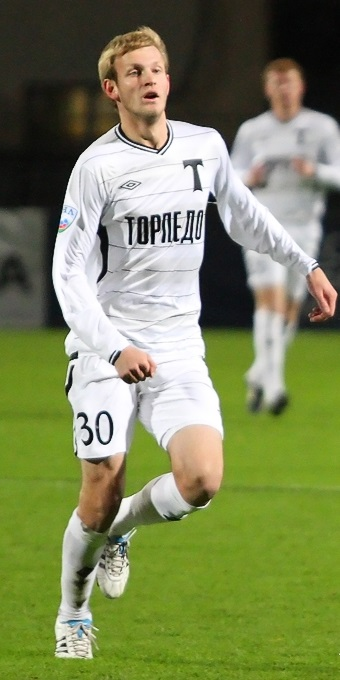

Personal information
- Full name: Denis Igorevich Dorozhkin
- Date of birth: 8 June 1987 (age 39)
- Place of birth: Volgograd, Russian SFSR
- Height: 1.90 m (6 ft 3 in)
- Position: Forward

Senior career*
Years	Team	Apps	(Gls)
2008–2011	Krasnodar	77	(20)
2010	→ Rotor Volgograd (loan)	16	(2)
2011	→ Chernomorets Novorossiysk (loan)	16	(1)
2011–2012	Torpedo Moscow	26	(9)
2012–2013	Spartak Nalchik	22	(1)
2013	Luch-Energiya Vladivostok	19	(3)
2014–2016	Ural Sverdlovsk Oblast	26	(2)
2016–2018	Tambov	36	(5)
2018	Fakel Voronezh	3	(0)
2018–2019	Pyunik	17	(0)
2019–2020	Novosibirsk	12	(2)
- * Club domestic league appearances and goals

Denis Igorevich Dorozhkin (Russian: Денис Игоревич Дорожкин; born 8 June 1987) is a Russian former professional football player.

== Career ==
=== Club ===
He made his Russian Premier League debut for FC Ural Yekaterinburg on 8 March 2014 in a game against FC Krasnodar.

On 1 June 2019, Dorozhkin was released by FC Pyunik.
