= Aleksandr Savin (footballer) =

Russian footballer

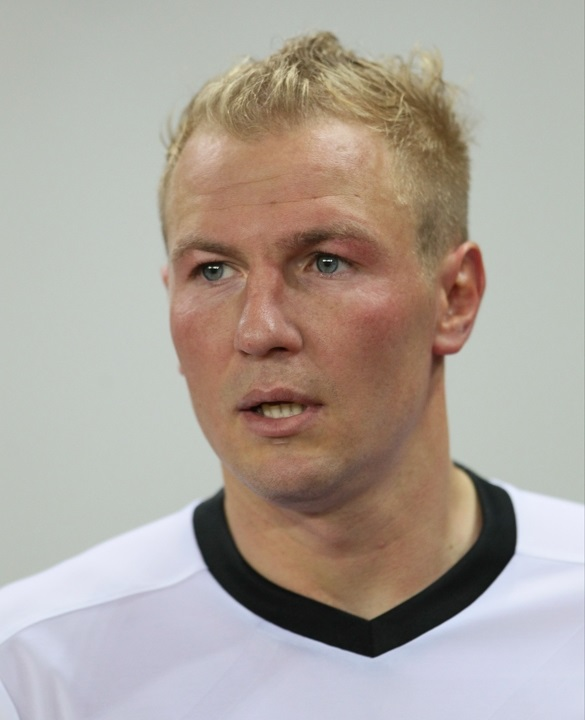

Personal information
- Full name: Aleksandr Mikhailovich Savin
- Date of birth: 20 October 1984 (age 42)
- Place of birth: Borovichi, Novgorod Oblast, Russian SFSR
- Height: 1.78 m (5 ft 10 in)
- Position: Forward

Team information
- Current team: FC Dynamo Saint Petersburg

Senior career*
Years	Team	Apps	(Gls)
2001–2006	Volochanin-Ratmir Vyshny Volochyok	125	(26)
2007	FC Aktobe	5	(0)
2008	Astana	27	(10)
2009	Volochanin-Ratmir Vyshny Volochyok	22	(7)
2010	FC Rotor Volgograd	28	(1)
2011	Volochanin-Ratmir Vyshny Volochyok	7	(1)
2012–2013	FC Volga Tver	19	(5)
2013–2014	FC Tosno	25	(12)
2014	FC Dynamo Saint Petersburg	5	(0)
2014–2015	FC Sochi	6	(0)
2016–2017	JK Sillamäe Kalev	53	(15)
2018–2019	FC LAZ Luga		
2019	FC Dynamo Saint Petersburg		
- * Club domestic league appearances and goals

Aleksandr Mikhailovich Savin (Russian: Александр Михайлович Савин; born 20 October 1984) is a Russian former professional football player.

== Club career ==
He made his Russian Football National League debut for FC Rotor Volgograd on 18 April 2010 in a game against FC Dynamo Saint Petersburg.
