= Aleksandr Khokhlachyov (footballer) =

Russian footballer

Personal information
- Full name: Aleksandr Vladimirovich Khokhlachyov
- Date of birth: 8 May 1997 (age 29)
- Place of birth: Rostov-on-Don, Russia
- Height: 1.82 m (6 ft 0 in)
- Position: Forward

Team information
- Current team: Rotor Volgograd
- Number: 7

Senior career*
Years	Team	Apps	(Gls)
2012–2013	FC Donenergo Aksay		
2014–2015	Viktor Ponedelnik Academy (amateur)		
2016–2025	Chayka Peschanokopskoye	258	(49)
2025–	Rotor Volgograd	32	(4)
2026–	→ Rotor-2 Volgograd	4	(2)
- * Club domestic league appearances and goals as of 31 October 2026

Aleksandr Vladimirovich Khokhlachyov (Russian: Александр Владимирович Хохлачёв; born 8 May 1997) is a Russian football player who plays for Rotor Volgograd.

== Club career ==
He made his debut in the Russian Professional Football League for Chayka Peschanokopskoye on 28 July 2016 in a game against Biolog-Novokubansk. He made his Russian Football National League debut for Chayka on 7 July 2019 in a game against Chertanovo Moscow.
