= SDYuSShOR-4 Sports School Volzhskiy =

- Full name: SDYuSShOR No.4 Sports School Volzhskiy
- Founded: 1974
- Ground: SDYuSShOR Volzhskiy
- Capacity: N/A
- Manager: Sergey Fomichenko
- League: Volgograd Oblast Football Championship
- Website: http://www.sdushor4vlz.ru/
Home colours

SDYuSShOR-4 Sports School Volzhskiy is a Russian football Sports school founded in 1974 in Volzhsky, Volgograd Oblast. It fields a team that plays in the specified Volgograd Oblast Football Championship.

Sports School SDYuSShOR-4 entered the esteemed and prestigious Volga Championship which showcases the utmost best Sport schools at national level.

== History ==
Founded in 1974, it marked its fortieth anniversary in 2014 with an inaugural inter-school sports contest.
