= Alim Karkayev =

Russian footballer

Personal information
- Full name: Alim Abdul-Kerimovich Karkayev
- Date of birth: 28 January 1985 (age 41)
- Place of birth: Nalchik, Russian SFSR
- Height: 1.85 m (6 ft 1 in)
- Positions: Forward; midfielder; defender

Senior career*
Years	Team	Apps	(Gls)
2003	FC Nart Cherkessk	21	(2)
2003–2004	FC Krasnodar-2000	14	(0)
2005	FC Chkalovets Novosibirsk	9	(2)
2006–2008	FC Kuban Krasnodar	1	(0)
2006	→ FC Sochi-04 (loan)	14	(5)
2007	→ FC Krasnodar-2000 (loan)	11	(1)
2008	→ FC Anzhi Makhachkala (loan)	2	(0)
2009–2010	FC Chernomorets Novorossiysk	29	(2)
2010	→ FC Torpedo Armavir (loan)	28	(3)
2011	FC Tyumen	28	(1)
2012–2014	FC Angusht Nazran	71	(2)
2014–2018	PFC Spartak Nalchik	98	(6)
- * Club domestic league appearances and goals

Alim Abdul-Kerimovich Karkayev (Russian: Алим Абдул-Керимович Каркаев; born 28 January 1985) is a Russian former professional football player.

== Club career ==
He made his Russian Football National League debut for FC Kuban Krasnodar on 16 October 2006 in a game against FC Salyut-Energiya Belgorod. He played 5 seasons in the FNL for Kuban, FC Anzhi Makhachkala, FC Chernomorets Novorossiysk, FC Angusht Nazran and PFC Spartak Nalchik.
