= Islam Bidov =

Russian footballer

Personal information
- Full name: Islam Anatolyevich Bidov
- Date of birth: 7 January 1987 (age 39)
- Height: 1.77 m (5 ft 9 1/2 in)
- Positions: Forward; midfielder

Senior career*
Years	Team	Apps	(Gls)
2005	PFC Spartak-2 Nalchik		
2005–2009	PFC Spartak Nalchik	0	(0)
2008–2009	→ FC Sheksna Cherepovets (loan)	41	(8)
2010–2011	FC Dynamo Stavropol	30	(4)
2011	FC Sheksna Cherepovets	9	(0)
2013	FC Spartak Gelendzhik		
2015–2016	FC Druzhba Maykop	7	(0)
- * Club domestic league appearances and goals

Islam Anatolyevich Bidov (Russian: Ислам Анатольевич Бидов; born 7 January 1987) is a former Russian professional football player.

== Club career ==
He made his debut for PFC Spartak Nalchik on 22 June 2005 in a Russian Cup game against FC Fakel Voronezh. He made 3 appearances for Spartak in Russian Cup overall.
