= Andrei Chichkin =

Russian footballer

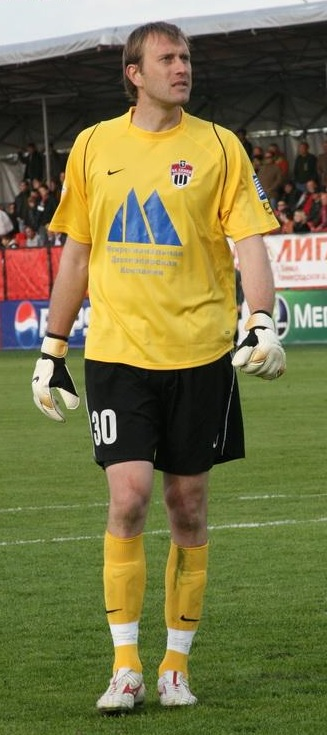

Personal information
- Full name: Andrei Grigoryevich Chichkin
- Date of birth: 12 October 1977 (age 49)
- Place of birth: Krasnodar, Russian SFSR
- Height: 1.95 m (6 ft 5 in)
- Position: Goalkeeper

Team information
- Current team: FC Chernomorets Novorossiysk (GK coach)

Senior career*
Years	Team	Apps	(Gls)
1993–1994	FC Kolos-2 Krasnodar	16	(0)
1995	FC Kolos Krasnodar	2	(0)
1996–2002	FC Rotor Volgograd	102	(0)
2003	FC Krylia Sovetov Samara	19	(0)
2004	FC Rotor Volgograd	24	(0)
2005–2006	FC Rostov	40	(0)
2007–2008	FC Khimki	7	(0)
2009	FC Luch-Energiya Vladivostok	18	(0)
2010	FC Rotor Volgograd	29	(0)
2011	FC Metallurg Lipetsk	4	(0)
2012–2014	FC Sever Murmansk	40	(0)

International career
1998–1999	Russia U-21	15	(0)
1998	Russia	1	(0)

Managerial career
- 2016–2017: FC Armavir (GK coach)
- 2017–2020: FC Mordovia Saransk (GK coach)
- 2021–2022: FC Metallurg Lipetsk (GK coach)
- 2022: FC Saransk (GK coach)
- 2022–2024: FC Metallurg Lipetsk (GK coach)
- 2024: FC Spartak Tambov (GK coach)
- 2024–: FC Chernomorets Novorossiysk (GK coach)
- * Club domestic league appearances and goals

Andrei Grigoryevich Chickin (Russian: Андрей Григорьевич Чичкин; born 12 October 1977) is a Russian football coach and a former player. He played as a goalkeeper. He works as goalkeeping coach with FC Chernomorets Novorossiysk.

== International career ==
Chichkin made his debut for Russia on 18 November 1998 in a friendly against Brazil. He was called up to the team again a few years later but never came off the bench backing up Sergei Ovchinnikov and Ruslan Nigmatullin.
