= Denis Kiselyov =

Russian footballer and coach

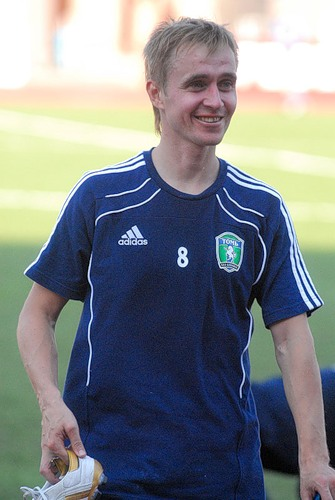

Personal information
- Full name: Denis Yuryevich Kiselyov
- Date of birth: 2 June 1978 (age 48)
- Place of birth: Zelenograd, Soviet Union
- Height: 1.80 m (5 ft 11 in)
- Position: Forward

Youth career
- FC Dynamo Moscow

Senior career*
Years	Team	Apps	(Gls)
1995–1997	FC Dynamo-2 Moscow	66	(11)
1998–1999	FC Sputnik Zelenograd		
1999	FC Dynamo-d Moscow	15	(3)
2000–2001	FC Dynamo-MTO-Mostransgaz Moscow		
2002	FC Mostransgaz Gazoprovod	0	(0)
2002–2003	FC Khimki	45	(18)
2004–2010	FC Tom Tomsk	97	(28)
2010	FC Volgar-Gazprom Astrakhan	13	(2)
2011–2012	FC Salyut Belgorod	34	(6)
2012–2013	FC Zenit Penza	22	(3)
2013	FC Dolgoprudny	11	(0)
Total		288+	(68+)

Managerial career
- 2017–2019: FC Khimki-M (assistant)
- * Club domestic league appearances and goals

Denis Yuryevich Kiselyov (Russian: Денис Юрьевич Киселёв; born 2 June 1978) is a Russian professional football coach and a former player.
