= Anton Mamonov =

Russian footballer

Personal information
- Full name: Anton Sergeyevich Mamonov
- Date of birth: 19 September 1989 (age 37)
- Place of birth: Ivanteyevka, Russian SFSR
- Height: 1.83 m (6 ft 0 in)
- Position: Forward

Youth career
- FC Khimki

Senior career*
Years	Team	Apps	(Gls)
2008–2011	FC Khimki	18	(1)
2010	→ FC Torpedo Moscow (loan)	3	(0)
2012	FC Dnepr Smolensk	7	(1)
2014	FC SKVO Rostov-on-Don	11	(1)
2014–2015	FC Afips Afipsky	25	(4)
2016–2017	FC Kubanskaya Korona Shevchenko		
2017	FC Dynamo Bryansk	17	(3)
2018–2020	FC Druzhba Maykop	39	(1)
2020–2021	FC Znamya Noginsk	19	(2)
- * Club domestic league appearances and goals

Anton Sergeyevich Mamonov (Russian: Антон Серге́евич Мамонов; born 19 September 1989) is a Russian former professional football player.

== Club career ==
He made his debut in the Russian Premier League on 9 August 2009 for FC Khimki in a game against FC Rostov.
