= FC Tsement Mikhaylovka =

Russian football club

FC Mikhailovka
- Full name: Football Mikhailovka
- Founded: 1995
- League: Volgograd Oblast Football Championship
- 2025: 1st

FC Mikhailovka (Russian: «Михайловка» (Михайловка)) is a Russian football team from Mikhailovka.

== Team name history ==
- 1995–1996 FC Dynamo Mikhailovka
- 1997 FC Rotor-2 Mikhailovka
- 1998 FC Spartak Mikhailovka
- 2005–2016 FC Tsement Mikhailovka
- 201?-present FC Mikhailovka

== Team history ==
- It played professionally from 1995 to 1997. Their best result was 12th place in Zone 2 of the Russian Third League in 1997.FC Mikhaylovka currently competes in the Volgograd Oblast Football Championship.

Since 2005, the team has been competing at the KFK level in the Chernozemye championship. At the end of the 2011-2012 season, FC Cement achieved a record-breaking 5th place in the standings (after playing 42 matches and earning 69 points).

Despite the fact that the club's founders include the city administration and the city-forming enterprise Sebryakovcement (Себряковский цементный завод), and its sponsors include representatives from the capital, the club's budget is considered one of the smallest in the league. The emphasis in recruitment is on the Mikhailovka pupils, of which at least half of the team.

Recently, football in the performance of "Cement" has become the most mass event in the sports life of Mikhailovka. Games with the participation of the team gather up to 2 thousand people (with a population of 63.7 thousand inhabitants), which is one of the best indicators in the league.

On March 11, 2016, it was announced that FC Cement would not participate in the Russian Football Championship of the Chernozemye region due to insufficient funding.In 2025 FC Mikhailovka took 1st place in the second group of the championship.

== Fans ==
- FC Mikhaylovka has an ultras firm MHK Jugend.Their enemies are FC Kireev
