= Essau Kanyenda =

Malawian footballer (1982–2025)

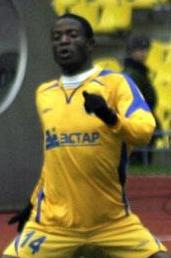
- Kanyenda in 2007

Personal information
- Full name: Essau Boxer Kanyenda
- Date of birth: 27 September 1982
- Place of birth: Nkhotakota, Malawi
- Date of death: 2 December 2025 (aged 43)
- Place of death: Manchester, England
- Height: 1.83 m (6 ft 0 in)
- Position: Forward

Youth career
- 1998–1999: FC Welfare

Senior career*
Years	Team	Apps	(Gls)
1998–2001	FC Dwasco	60	(41)
2001–2003	Jomo Cosmos	46	(26)
2003–2005	Rostov	63	(16)
2005–2007	Lokomotiv Moscow	3	(0)
2006–2007	→ Rostov (loan)	44	(10)
2008–2010	KAMAZ	44	(21)
2010	→ Rotor Volgograd (loan)	27	(7)
2011	Dynamo Bryansk	12	(0)
2012	B93	5	(0)
2012–2017	Polokwane City	99	(22)
2017–2018	Mighty Wanderers		(14)

International career
1999–2015	Malawi	71	(21)
- * Club domestic league appearances and goals

Essau Kanyenda (27 September 1982 – 2 December 2025) was a Malawian professional footballer who played as a forward. He made 65 appearances scoring 21 goals for the Malawi national team.

== Club career ==
Kanyenda started his career in 1998 in Malawi's First Division for FC Welfare in Dwangwa. He was spotted by Jomo Sono the owner of Jomo Cosmos during the Cosafa under 17 in 1999. He was with Jomo Cosmos under 17 alongside Peter Mponda, in two tours in Italy where he played several games and become second top goalscorer on both occasions. He then turned professional and played in the Premier League of Malawi from 1999 to 2001 for FC Dwasco (Nkhota-Kota), before moving to South Africa to play in its Premier League, with Jomo Cosmos in Johannesburg between 2001 and 2003.

In 2003, Kanyenda moved to Russia, for Rostov in the Russian Premier League. In 2005, he left briefly for Lokomotiv Moscow after being the third top goal scorer in Russian top league, but re-joined Rostov on loan until December 2007. After two years with Lokomotv Moscow joined in January 2008 to KAMAZ. He was their top goalscorer in that season. Kanyenda has played for Rotor Volgograd (loan) and Dynamo Bryansk (loan).

In spring 2012, he was persuaded to join the Danish side B93 by the former Malawai national team manager Kim Splidsboel.

In September 2012, he signed a contract with the South African side Polokwane City.

== International career ==
Kanyenda was also a member of the Malawi national team, beginning his international career on 12 March 2000 against Zambia.

== Personal life and death ==
Kanyenda lived in Manchester with his family. He died from liver cancer on 2 December 2025, at the age of 43.

== Career statistics ==
Scores and results list Malawi's goal tally first, score column indicates score after each Kanyenda goal.

List of international goals scored by Essau Kanyenda
No.	Date	Venue	Opponent	Score	Result	Competition
	9 October 2010	Blantyre, Malawi	Chad		6–2	2012 Africa Cup of Nations qualification
