= Azamat Gonezhukov =

Russian footballer

Personal information
- Full name: Azamat Nurbiyevich Gonezhukov
- Date of birth: 13 January 1987 (age 39)
- Place of birth: Maykop, Republic of Adygea, Soviet Union
- Height: 1.80 m (5 ft 11 in)
- Position: Forward

Senior career*
Years	Team	Apps	(Gls)
2006	FC Druzhba Maykop	9	(0)
2007	FC Nara-Desna Naro-Fominsk	27	(10)
2008–2010	FC Dynamo Saint Petersburg	82	(35)
2011–2012	FC Baltika Kaliningrad	39	(7)
2012–2013	FC Volgar-Gazprom Astrakhan	13	(1)
2013–2014	FC Sokol Saratov	39	(16)
2014–2015	FC Ryazan	27	(4)
2015	FC Baikal Irkutsk	15	(3)
2016	FC Tambov	9	(3)
2016–2017	FC Torpedo Moscow	22	(5)
2017–2018	FC Syzran-2003	19	(1)
- * Club domestic league appearances and goals

Azamat Nurbiyevich Gonezhukov (Russian: Азамат Нурбиевич Гонежуков; born 13 January 1987) is a former Russian professional football player.

== Club career ==
He played 4 seasons in the Russian Football National League for 4 different clubs.
