= Svetly Yar =

Svetly Yar (Russian: Све́тлый Яр) is the name of several inhabited localities in Russia.

Urban localities

- Svetly Yar, Svetloyarsky District, Volgograd Oblast, a work settlement in Svetloyarsky District of Volgograd Oblast

Rural localities

- Svetly Yar, Rostov Oblast, a settlement in Kalininskoye Rural Settlement of Kagalnitsky District of Rostov Oblast
- Svetly Yar, Alexeyevsky District, Volgograd Oblast, a settlement in Krasnooktyabrsky Selsoviet of Alexeyevsky District of Volgograd Oblast
