= Aleksei Zhitnikov =

Russian footballer

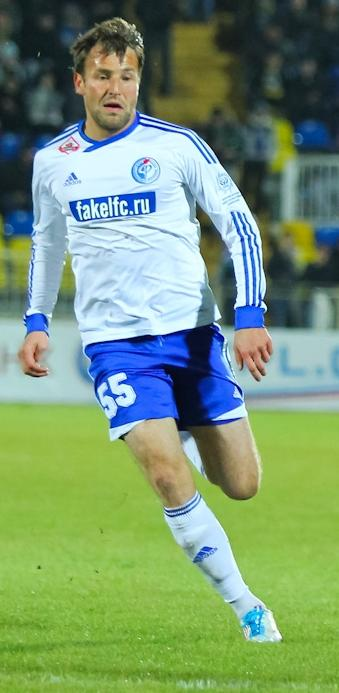
- Zhitnikov with Fakel in 2012

Personal information
- Full name: Aleksei Anatolyevich Zhitnikov
- Date of birth: 7 December 1984 (age 41)
- Place of birth: Rybolovo, Russian SFSR
- Height: 1.76 m (5 ft 9 in)
- Positions: Midfielder; right back

Youth career
- FC Saturn Ramenskoye

Senior career*
Years	Team	Apps	(Gls)
2001–2006	FC Saturn Ramenskoye	18	(0)
2007	FC Khimki	4	(0)
2007	→ FC Salyut-Energia Belgorod (loan)	17	(0)
2008–2010	FC Sibir Novosibirsk	36	(0)
2009	→ FC Vityaz Podolsk (loan)	14	(2)
2010	FC Rotor Volgograd	38	(3)
2011	FC Volgar-Gazprom Astrakhan	2	(0)
2011–2013	FC Fakel Voronezh	53	(0)
2013	FC Avangard Kursk	14	(0)
2014–2017	FC Dolgoprudny	91	(3)
2017–2018	FC Dynamo Saint Petersburg	29	(0)
2018	FC Zorky Krasnogorsk	14	(1)
2019	FC Saturn Ramenskoye	4	(1)
2019–2020	FC Ryazan	17	(2)
2020–2021	FC Znamya Truda Orekhovo-Zuyevo	23	(2)
2021	FC Znamya Noginsk	19	(0)
2022	FC Saturn Ramenskoye	9	(1)

International career
2005–2006	Russia U-21	2	(0)
- * Club domestic league appearances and goals

Aleksei Anatolyevich Zhitnikov (Russian: Алексей Анатольевич Житников; born 7 December 1984) is a Russian former professional footballer.

== Club career ==
He made his debut in the Russian Premier League in 2003 for FC Saturn-RenTV Ramenskoye.
