= FC Olimpia Volgograd =

- Full name: Football Club Olimpia Volgograd
- Founded: 1989
- League: Volgograd Oblast Championship
- 2015: 3rd

FC Olimpia Volgograd (Russian: «Олимпия» (Волгоград)) is a Russian football club based in Volgograd.

== History ==
From their founding in 1989 until 1997, the club participated in various youth leagues. Some time between 1993 and 1994 the Volgograd native Leonid Slutsky, future coach of the Russian national team, joined the training staff. Among the Olimpia youth players developed under Slutsky were Denis Kolodin, Roman Adamov, Andrei Bochkov, Maksim Burchenko and Aleksei Zhdanov, all of whom went on to play in the Russian Premier League. As this group of players graduated from the youth team, they and Olimpia joined first the senior Amateur Football League in 1998 and, after winning the South Zone in 1999, the professional Second Division. Slutsky stayed with the club until 2001 when he left for Uralan Elista. The squad he left at Olimpia narrowly missed promotion to the second tier three times, with successive 3rd, 3rd and 2nd-place finishes in their zone.

Olimpia continued to play professionally until 2008, though their fortunes faded after Slutsky's players left. Before the 2009 season their professional license was taken over by the new club FC Volgograd. This was meant to allow FC to assume the name and identity of Rotor who were suffering off-field troubles, but Rotor survived and ended up playing simultaneously with the new FC in 2009, while Olimpia dropped into the Volgograd Oblast Championship. They stayed there until 2011, winning the title in 2010. With confusion ongoing over the future of the Rotor name and club, Olimpia were allowed to resume their place in the Second Division in 2012 and managed a 4th-place finish in 2013/14. However, following Rotor's decision to enter the fourth-level Amateur Football League for 2015, Olimpia once again withdrew from the national pyramid and entered the Volgograd Oblast championship.
