= FC Rotor-2 Volgograd =

Russian football club

Rotor-2 Volgograd
- Full name: Football Club Rotor-2 Volgograd
- Founded: 1992
- Ground: Zenit Stadium
- Capacity: 3,586
- Chairman: Vasili Andrushchenko
- Manager: Valeri Burlachenko
- League: Russian Second League, Division B, Zone 3
- 2026: 14th
- Website: rotor-vlg.com

FC Rotor-2 Volgograd (Russian: ФК «Ротор-Волгоград-2» Волгоград) is a Russian football team based in Volgograd. It is the farm club for FC Rotor Volgograd. It previously played professionally as FC Rotor-d Volgograd or FC Rotor-2 Volgograd in the Russian Second Division in 1992–1993, 1998–2000 and 2004 and Russian Third League in 1994–1997. They came in 3rd place in their Second Division zone in 1993. In 2001, the reserves tournament for Russian Premier League was re-established and the reserves team played there while the main team stayed in Premier League.

In 2005, the main Rotor team played under the name of FC Rotor-2 Volgograd, as the parent club had lost their professional licence. Subsequently, Rotor-2 was renamed Rotor, and a Rotor reserve side entered the Volgograd Oblast Championship. Following Rotor's promotion to the second-tier Russian National Football League for the 2017–18 season, the reserve team received professional license for the third-tier Russian Professional Football League. Following Rotor's promotion to Russian Premier League for the 2020–21 season, Rotor-2 left PFL as RPL conducts their own Under-20 league for reserve teams. Rotor was relegated after one season at the top level, and Rotor-2 re-entered PFL for the 2021–22 season. The parent club was itself relegated once again, to the third-tier FNL 2 at the end of the 2021–22 season, making Rotor-2 ineligible to play in the same league.

For the 2025 season, Rotor-2 was registered for the fourth-tier Russian Second League Division B.

== Current squad ==
As of 13 September 2026, according to the Second League website.

Note: Flags indicate national team as defined under FIFA eligibility rules; some limited exceptions apply. Players may hold more than one non-FIFA nationality.

No.	Pos.	Nation	Player
2	DF	RUS	Leon Amirkhanyan
7	DF	RUS	Mikhail Kharlan
8	MF	RUS	Mikhail Tsipushtanov
9	FW	RUS	Mikhalis Kyurdzhiyev
11	MF	RUS	Andrey Dyomushkin
12	DF	RUS	Timofey Falchenko
14	DF	RUS	Andrey Khityayev
15	MF	RUS	Danila Ponomaryov
16	GK	RUS	Batyr Umirov
17	MF	RUS	Matvey Aslanyan
18	MF	RUS	Roman Litenko
19	MF	RUS	Nikita Plotnikov
22	MF	RUS	Daniil Grada
24	FW	RUS	Sergey Prokofyev

No.	Pos.	Nation	Player
25	MF	RUS	Ruslan Slepuzhnikov
26	GK	RUS	Aleksandr Prokhorov
27	FW	RUS	Mikhail Semenenko
34	DF	RUS	Maksim Khramtsov
53	MF	RUS	Dmitry Loktev
67	FW	RUS	Adrian Platon
75	DF	RUS	Yegor Kychanov
77	FW	RUS	Aleksandr Khokhlachyov
88	FW	RUS	Maksim Kondratyev
91	DF	RUS	Yegor Tarin
95	DF	RUS	Stepan Pravkin
96	FW	RUS	Rasul Bidzhilov
98	GK	RUS	Ivan Litvenok
99	GK	RUS	Oleg Lisitsyn
