= FC Volgograd =

Russian football club

- Full name: Football Club Volgograd
- Founded: 2008
- Dissolved: 2010
- Ground: Olimpia Stadium
- Chairman: Sergei Marushkin
- Manager: Valeri Burlachenko
- League: Russian Second Division
- 2009: 3rd
Home colours	Away colours

FC Volgograd (Russian: ФК Волгоград) is a former Russian football club from Volgograd, founded in late 2008, later reformed as FC Rotor Volgograd.

== History ==
Before it was founded, it was originally supposed to be called FC Rotor-Volgograd Volgograd (to keep Rotor's name around at the time FC Rotor Volgograd was close to bankruptcy). However, FC Rotor's financial situation has improved by early 2009 and the club was registered as FC Volgograd. It played in the Russian Second Division in 2009. It took over the license of FC Olimpia Volgograd, who were having financial difficulties at the time.

In 2010, FC Vityaz Podolsk gave up their place in the Russian First Division. Professional Football League offered the First Division spots to clubs who came in 2nd in their Russian Second Division zones in 2009, but none of them agreed to play in the First Division. FC Volgograd was then offered a spot and agreed to take it. They played in the second-highest Russian First Division in 2010. On February 8, 2010, it was announced that the club was to be renamed to FC Rotor Volgograd (the previous club under that name went bankrupt during the 2009 season).
