= FC Rotor Volgograd =

Association football club in Russia

Rotor Volgograd
- Full name: АНО «Спортивный клуб „Ротор“» Волгоград
- Nickname: Sine-Golubie (Blue-cyan)
- Founded: 1929; 97 years ago
- Ground: Volgograd Arena
- Capacity: 45,568
- Coach: Dmytro Parfyonov
- League: Russian First League
- 2024–25: 9th of 18
- Website: rotor-vlg.com
Home colours	Away colours	Third colours

SC Rotor Volgograd (Russian: СK Ротор Волгоград, romanized: SK Rotor Volgograd) is a Russian professional football club from the large city of Volgograd, Volgograd Oblast (formerly Stalingrad). The club plays in the second-tier Russian First League, and are the largest and best supported Volgograd club. For most of their existence, they have been the city's only representatives in the national league system.

They played at the top level of Soviet/Russian football either side of World War II, from 1989 to 1990, from 1991 to 2004 and in the 2020–21 season. During the 1990s, they were one of the strongest clubs in newly independent Russia and qualified for European competition four times. In recent years, financial and ownership difficulties have repeatedly threatened their professional status and they have played mostly in lower regional leagues.

The team currently plays its home games at the Volgograd Arena since 2018.

== History ==
Both the current team name and the former name "Traktor" are references to the Stalingrad Tractor Factory, once a major producer of tractors, and the scene of heavy fighting during the Battle of Stalingrad during World War II.

=== Soviet era ===
The creation of a Russian national football pyramid immediately prior to World War II propelled Traktor Stalingrad to national prominence. Traktor were champions of the new fourth-level Group G in 1937, and were then promoted straight to the highest-level Group A as it expanded from 9 clubs to 26. They remained at the top level until 1950.

Rotor then spent three decades at the top regional level, although the creation of the Supreme League in 1970 pushed their league from the second level overall down to the third. They gradually improved throughout the 1970s and finally won Zone III of the Soviet Second League (the third tier) in 1980 and 1981, and were successful in the promotion playoffs the second time.

In 1988 Rotor finished second in the Soviet First League, earning promotion to the Soviet Top League. They finished 13th and last in the downsized 1990 competition after the Georgian and Lithuanian teams withdrew, and the decision was made to relegate them. However they bounced straight back as champions of the First League in 1991, thus becoming founder members of the new Russian Top Division after the USSR collapsed.

=== Top Division/Premier League and Europe ===
In the mid-1990s, Rotor was one of the strongest clubs in Russia, rivalling Spartak Moscow for the championship, yet never winning it. Rotor became the league runners-up in 1993 and 1997.

Rotor played five successive seasons in European competition, from 1994–95 to 1998–99. They qualified for the UEFA Cup through their league position every year except 1996–97, when they instead chose to enter the Intertoto Cup. Unfortunately for Rotor, the fall of communism had left all the former Eastern Bloc leagues badly under-resourced compared to their Western counterparts, and indeed Rotor were knocked out by all four of the French and Italian clubs they played. The exception came against England's Manchester United in 1995–96. Having drawn the home leg 0–0, Rotor raced into a 2–0 lead at Old Trafford before United scored their first goal. Rotor were seconds away from being the first European club to win at Old Trafford when United's goalkeeper Peter Schmeichel scored a famous equaliser, but the 2–2 draw meant Rotor progressed by the away goals rule. They went on to be defeated by eventual Runners-up Bordeaux in the second round.

Full European results:

Season	Competition	Round	Club	Home	Away	Aggregate
1994–95	UEFA Cup	1R	(France) Nantes	3–2	0–3	3–5
1995–96	UEFA Cup	1R	(England) Manchester United	0–0	2–2 (a)	2–2
1995–96	UEFA Cup	2R	(France) Bordeaux	1–2	0–1	1–3
1996–97	Intertoto Cup	Group 7	(Belarus) Ataka-Aura		4–0	
1996–97	Intertoto Cup	Group 7	(Ukraine) Shakhtar	4–1		
1996–97	Intertoto Cup	Group 7	(Turkey) Antalyaspor		1–2	
1996–97	Intertoto Cup	Group 7	(Switzerland) Basel	3–2		
1996–97	Intertoto Cup	SF	(Austria) Linz	5–0	2–2	7–2
1996–97	Intertoto Cup	F	(France) Guingamp	2–1	0–1 (a)	2–2
1997–98	UEFA Cup	QR	(Poland) Odra Wodzislaw	2–0	4–3	6–3
1997–98	UEFA Cup	1R	(Sweden) Örebro	2–0	4–1	6–1
1997–98	UEFA Cup	2R	(Italy) Lazio	0–0	0–3	0–3
1998–99	UEFA Cup	QR	(Federal Republic of Yugoslavia) Red Star Belgrade	1–2	1–2	2–4

- QR: Qualifying round

In the 2000s, Rotor's results declined, and in 2004, the team finished last in the Russian Premier League. The club's owner Vladimir Goryunov, a member of the Duma and head of the parliamentary sports committee, explored options to save Rotor from relegation, such as expanding the Premier League to 20 teams. But in January 2005 Rotor were unable to make the required financial guarantees and so lost their professional licence entirely.

=== 2005–2014: Financial troubles and decline ===
Rotor's reserve side in the Russian Second Division, Rotor-2 Volgograd, became the club's first team and was renamed Rotor in 2006. In 2007 local businessman Oleg Mikheev acquired the club's main asset the Volgograd Central Stadium, and with it effective control over the club, but financial troubles continued and the team's performances in the Second Division declined.

Matters came to a head in 2009. Russia had officially launched its bid for the FIFA World Cup 2018 and Volgograd city was in line for a new stadium – provided they had a professional club to fill it after the tournament. Rotor, facing legal action and a transfer embargo due to their financial status, were not reliable candidates. The government created a new entity, FC Volgograd, intending to assume the Rotor name. In fact, Rotor managed to co-exist with the new FC for the first half of the 2009 season, before Mikheev suspended operations and the government took ownership of the club and stadium from him. The two clubs were merged into one, and the new Rotor Volgograd were promoted to the second-level Russian Football National League thanks to teams above them withdrawing.

The regional Ministry of Sport invested 150 million roubles ($4.9m) in the club's playing budget for the 2010 campaign, but it ended in failure as Rotor were relegated in 17th place. Governor Brovko admitted that the transition to the higher level was made too quickly. Former club player Sergei Nechay took over management and steered the team to promotion as champions of their Second Division zone in 2011–12. This time they were able to consolidate in the National League, finishing 9th and then 14th.

But financial troubles continued. A Ministry of Sport investigation found evidence of financial misconduct by club management along with substantial overspending, and regional Governor Andrey Bocharov announced after the 2013 season that government support for Rotor was being withdrawn. The club dropped back into the Second Division (renamed the Professional Football League) for the first half of the 2014–15 (autumn-spring) season, then withdrew in order to immediately transfer to the 2015 (spring-autumn) Russian Amateur Football League, the fourth level overall.

=== 2015–present: Revival and a new decline ===
In the 2015 season Rotor won the Amateur League Chernozemye (South-West Region) division at the first attempt by 11 points, suffering only one defeat in 22 games. The 45,000-seater Volgograd Arena was under construction on their old Central Stadium site, and it was reported in August 2015 that the first team was still interested in moving into the facility after the 2018 World Cup, which made attaining a higher league status a priority. They were licensed for third-tier Russian Professional Football League for the 2016–17 season. They won their zone of the PFL in the 2016–17 season and were promoted to the second-level Russian National Football League for 2017–18.

Despite ending the 2017–18 season in the relegation zone, the club stayed in the league for the 2018–19 season as another team that finished above them in the table failed to obtain the league license.

On 15 May 2020, FNL season was abandoned due to the COVID-19 pandemic in Russia. As Rotor was in the 1st position in the standings, they were promoted to the Russian Premier League for the 2020–21 season, returning to the top level after a 16-year break.

In the 2020–21 Russian Premier League season, Rotor only was able to score 15 goals in 30 games, and finished in 15th place, leading to relegation back to FNL after one season in the top tier. They also were awarded two losses due to a COVID-19 outbreak in the squad. In the 2021–22 Russian Football National League, Rotor finished 18th out of 20 clubs, suffering second consecutive relegation.

In the 2023–24 season, Rotor qualified for the Second League promotion play-offs, in which they defeated FC Novosibirsk to earn promotion back to the Russian First League.

In the 2025-26 season, Rotor qualified for the First League promotion play-offs, they were defeated 2–1 on aggregate by Akron Tolyatti and remained in the First League.

== Honours ==
=== Leagues ===
- Soviet Top League / Russian Premier League (first tier)
  - Runners-up (2): 1993, 1997
- Soviet / Russian First League (second tier)
  - Winners (2): 1991, 2019–20
  - Runners-up (1): 1988
- Soviet / Russian Second League (third tier)
  - Winners (2): 1981, 2011–12
  - Runners-up (2): 1979, 1980
- Soviet Second League B / Russian Amateur Football League (fourth tier)
  - Winners (2): 1937, 2015 (Chernozemye Region)

=== Cups ===
- Russian Cup
  - Runners-up (1): 1994–95
- King's Cup (Thailand)
  - Winners (1): 1995
- Far East Club Championship (Held only once in China in 1998)
  - Winners (1): 1998

== Current squad ==
As of 11 September 2026, according to the First League website.

Note: Flags indicate national team as defined under FIFA eligibility rules; some limited exceptions apply. Players may hold more than one non-FIFA nationality.

No.	Pos.	Nation	Player
1	GK	RUS	Vladimir Sugrobov
2	MF	RUS	Irakli Manelov (on loan from Baltika Kaliningrad)
4	DF	RUS	Georgy Yudintsev (on loan from Rodina Moscow)
5	MF	RUS	Aleksandr Troshechkin
6	MF	RUS	Mikhail Umnikov (on loan from Krasnodar)
7	FW	RUS	Aleksandr Khokhlachyov
8	MF	RUS	Timur Ayupov
9	FW	RUS	Said Aliyev
10	MF	ARM	Artyom Simonyan
11	FW	RUS	Abu-Said Eldarushev
12	FW	RUS	Atsamaz Revazov (on loan from Orenburg)
13	GK	RUS	Nikita Chagrov
15	DF	RUS	Yegor Danilkin

No.	Pos.	Nation	Player
16	DF	RUS	Nikolai Poyarkov
17	DF	RUS	Nikolai Pokidyshev
18	FW	RUS	Ilya Rodionov
19	MF	RUS	Nikita Plotnikov
20	GK	RUS	Ivan Litvenok
21	MF	ARM	Pavel Gorelov
22	MF	RUS	Alan Tsarayev
23	DF	RUS	Maksim Khramtsov
24	DF	RUS	Aleksandr Kleshchenko
25	DF	CGO	Emmerson
28	FW	RUS	Aleksandr Khubulov
29	DF	RUS	Andrey Khityayev
39	MF	RUS	Mikhail Tsipushtanov

== Historical names ==
- Traktorostroitel Stalingrad (1929~1936)
- Dzerzhinets-STZ Stalingrad (1936)
- Traktor Stalingrad (1937~47)
- Torpedo Stalingrad (1948~57)
- Traktor Stalingrad (1958~60)
- Traktor Volgograd (1961~69)
- Stal Volgograd (1970~1971)
- Barrikady Volgograd (1972~1974)
- Rotor Volgograd (1975~2004)
- Rotor-2 (2005)
- Rotor (2006~2009,2010~2014)
- Rotor Volgograd (2015~2018)
- Rotor (2018~)

== Notable players ==
Had international caps for their respective countries. Players whose name is listed in bold represented their countries while playing for Rotor.

Russia/USSR

- (Soviet Union) Anatoli Zinchenko
- (Soviet Union) (Commonwealth of Independent States) (Russia) Oleg Sergeyev
- (Soviet Union) Aleksandr Ponomarev
- (Commonwealth of Independent States) Valeri Kleimyonov
- (Commonwealth of Independent States) (Russia) Igor Lediakhov
- (Russia) **Evgeni Aldonin**
- (Russia) **Aleksei Bakharev**
- (Russia) **Albert Borzenkov**
- (Russia) Maksim Buznikin
- (Russia) **Andrei Chichkin**
- (Russia) Aleksei Gerasimenko
- (Russia) Yevgeni Makeyev
- (Russia) **Nikolai Olenikov**
- (Russia) Roman Pavlyuchenko
- (Russia) Aleksei Rebko
- (Russia) **Aleksandr Shmarko**
- (Russia) **Oleg Veretennikov**
- (Russia) Roman Vorobyov
- (Russia) **Valeri Yesipov**
- (Russia) **Denis Zubko**

Armenia

- (Armenia) Khoren Bayramyan
- (Armenia) Armen Manucharyan

Azerbaijan

- (Azerbaijan) Rizvan Umarov

Belarus

- (Belarus) Dzmitry Kamarowski
- (Belarus) Andrei Kovalenko
- (Belarus) **Ivan Mayewski**
- (Belarus) **Dzmitry Rawneyka**

Estonia

- (Estonia) **Sergei Pareiko**

Georgia

- (Georgia (country)) Giorgi Arabidze
- (Georgia (country)) **Zuriko Davitashvili**
- (Georgia (country)) **Solomon Kvirkvelia**
- (Georgia (country)) **Beka Mikeltadze**

Kazakhstan

- (Kazakhstan) Vitaliy Abramov
- (Kazakhstan) Yuri Aksenov
- (Kazakhstan) Valeri Korobkin
- (Kazakhstan) Andrei Miroshnichenko
- (Kazakhstan) (Russia) **Vladimir Niederhaus**
- (Kazakhstan) Aleksey Shchotkin
- (Kazakhstan) Dmitri Shomko
- (Kazakhstan) **Sergei Zhunenko**

Latvia

- (Latvia) **Ivans Lukjanovs**

Malawi

- (Malawi) **Essau Kanyenda**

Moldova

- (Moldova) Alexandr Covalenco

Tajikistan

- (Tajikistan) **Andrei Manannikov**

Ukraine

- (Ukraine) Yuri Hudymenko
- (Ukraine) Yuri Kalitvintsev
- (Ukraine) **Hennadiy Orbu**
- (Ukraine) **Ihor Zhabchenko**

Uzbekistan

- (Uzbekistan) Vitaliy Denisov
- (Uzbekistan) Yaroslav Krushelnitskiy
- (Uzbekistan) Vladimir Radkevich

Venezuela

- (Venezuela) Andrés Ponce
