= 2013–14 FC Rotor Volgograd season =

Rotor Volgograd
2013–14 season
- Chairman: Sergei Nechay
- Manager: Valeri Burlachenko, Igor Lediakhov, F.Shcherbachenko
- Stadium: Tsentralniy, Volgograd
- RNFL: 15th
- Russian Cup: Round of 8 vs Rostov
- Top goalscorer: League: Aleksandr Stavpets (6); All: Aleksandr Stavpets (6)
- Highest home attendance: 13,500 vs Lokomotiv; 30 October 2013
- Lowest home attendance: 1,100 vs Baltika; 31 March 2014
- Average home league attendance: 5,929
Home colours	Away colours	Third colours

The 2013–14 Rotor Volgograd season was the 3rd season that the club played in the Russian National Football League.

== Squad ==
As of 28 February 2014

Note: Flags indicate national team as defined under FIFA eligibility rules; some limited exceptions apply. Players may hold more than one non-FIFA nationality.

No.	Pos.	Nation	Player
4	MF	RUS	Semyon Fomin
5	DF	RUS	Dmitri Guz
6	DF	UKR	Aleksandr Malygin (captain)
8	MF	RUS	Aleksei Pugin
9	FW	RUS	Khyzyr Appayev
10	MF	RUS	Artur Rylov
13	FW	RUS	Aleksandr Korotayev
14	DF	RUS	Pyotr Ten
16	GK	RUS	Denis Pchelintsev
17	MF	RUS	Khoren Bayramyan
19	FW	RUS	Andrei Myazin
20	MF	RUS	Roman Voydel

No.	Pos.	Nation	Player
22	MF	RUS	Nikita Glushkov
23	MF	RUS	Andrei Mikheyev
27	DF	RUS	Mikhail Merkulov
29	MF	RUS	Maksim Yakovlev
31	DF	RUS	Andrei Vasyanovich
33	DF	FRA	Abdel Lamanje
35	GK	RUS	Denis Kniga
66	DF	RUS	Vitali Ustinov
77	GK	RUS	Aleksandr Bondar
87	MF	LAT	Ivans Lukjanovs
88	DF	RUS	Ilya Zinin
92	FW	RUS	Dmitri Kabutov

== Transfers ==
=== Summer ===
In: Note: Flags indicate national team as defined under FIFA eligibility rules; some limited exceptions apply. Players may hold more than one non-FIFA nationality.

No.	Pos.	Nation	Player
—	GK	RUS	Valeri Polyakov (end of loan from (Russia) Energiya Volzhsky)
1	GK	BLR	Illya Hawrylaw (from (Russia) Khimki)
3	DF	RUS	Stepan Ryabokon (end of loan from (Russia) Energiya Volzhsky)
4	MF	RUS	Semyon Fomin (from (Russia) Lokomotiv Moscow)
7	FW	RUS	Anton Arkhipov (from (Israel) Hapoel Bnei Lod)
9	FW	RUS	Khyzyr Appayev (on loan from (Russia) Krasnodar)
14	DF	RUS	Pyotr Ten (on loan from (Russia) CSKA Moscow)
17	MF	RUS	Khoren Bayramyan (on loan from (Russia) Rostov)
20	MF	RUS	Roman Voydel (from (Russia) Ufa)
30	MF	BLR	Dzmitri Kamarowski (from (Belarus) Gomel)
31	DF	RUS	Andrei Vasyanovich (from (Russia) CSKA Moscow)
33	DF	FRA	Abdel Lamanje (from (Russia) Shinnik Yaroslavl)
66	DF	RUS	Vitali Ustinov (from (Russia) Neftekhimik Nizhnekamsk)
87	MF	LAT	Ivans Lukjanovs (from (Russia) Volgar Astrakhan)

Out: Note: Flags indicate national team as defined under FIFA eligibility rules; some limited exceptions apply. Players may hold more than one non-FIFA nationality.

No.	Pos.	Nation	Player
—	GK	RUS	Valeri Polyakov (to (Russia) Olimpia Volgograd)
1	GK	RUS	Aleksandr Malyshev (to (Russia) Shinnik Yaroslavl)
3	DF	RUS	Nikolai Olenikov (to (Russia) Sever Murmansk)
3	DF	RUS	Stepan Ryabokon (on loan to (Russia) Olimpia Volgograd)
4	MF	RUS	Semyon Fomin (end loan from (Russia) Lokomotiv Moscow)
7	FW	RUS	Sergei Shumilin (to (Russia) Lokomotiv-2 Moscow)
19	MF	SRB	Ivan Todorović (to (Serbia) Čukarički)
20	FW	RUS	Khyzyr Appayev (end loan from (Russia) Krasnodar)
23	MF	RUS	Sergei Vaganov (to (Russia) Mordovia Saransk)
25	MF	RUS	Aleksandr Leontiev (to Youth system)
31	DF	RUS	Andrei Vasyanovich (end loan from (Russia) CSKA Moscow)
38	MF	RUS	Oleg Aleynik (to (Russia) Olimpia Volgograd)
77	DF	RUS	Deviko Khinchagov (to (Russia) Sakhalin Yuzhno-Sakhalinsk)
90	MF	RUS	Denis Arlashin (on loan to (Russia) Zenit Penza)

=== Winter ===
In: Note: Flags indicate national team as defined under FIFA eligibility rules; some limited exceptions apply. Players may hold more than one non-FIFA nationality.

No.	Pos.	Nation	Player
—	FW	RUS	Dmitri Michurenkov (from (Russia) GTS Ryzdvyany)
19	GK	RUS	Andrei Myazin (on loan from (Russia) Ufa)
23	MF	RUS	Andrei Mikheyev (from (Russia) Salyut Belgorod)
29	MF	RUS	Maksim Yakovlev (from (Russia) Salyut Belgorod)
35	GK	RUS	Denis Kniga (on loan from (Russia) Luch-Energiya Vladivostok)

Out: Note: Flags indicate national team as defined under FIFA eligibility rules; some limited exceptions apply. Players may hold more than one non-FIFA nationality.

No.	Pos.	Nation	Player
—	FW	RUS	Vladislav Khrushchak (on loan to (Russia) Energiya Volzhsky)
1	GK	BLR	Illya Hawrylaw
2	DF	RUS	Ilya Ionov (to (Russia) Torpedo Armavir)
7	FW	RUS	Anton Arkhipov (to (Russia) Khimik Dzerzhinsk)
11	FW	RUS	Aleksandr Stavpets (to (Russia) Ural Yekaterinburg)
18	MF	RUS	Aleksandr Nechayev (to (Russia) Olimpia Volgograd)
30	MF	BLR	Dzmitry Kamarowski (to (Belarus) Gomel)

== Competitions ==
=== Friendlies ===
21 June 2013 Pre-season	Rotor Volgograd (Russia)	1–0	(Bosnia and Herzegovina) Sarajevo	(Hungary) Szombathely
	1:0 Barsov 54'			Stadium: Rohonci Út

25 June 2013 Pre-season	Rotor Volgograd	0–0	Gazovik Orenburg	(Hungary) Bük

28 June 2013 Pre-season	Rotor Volgograd (Russia)	1–3	(Croatia) Split	(Austria) Stinatz
	1:2 Lamanje 42'		0:1 Erceg 14'; 0:2 Belle 30'; 1:3 Paracki 72'	Stadium: ASKÖ

15 January 2014 Mid-season	Karmiotissa Polemidion (Cyprus)	0–12	(Russia) Rotor Volgograd	(Cyprus) Limassol
			0:1 Pugin 44'; Michurenkov; Korotayev; Kabutov; Bayramyan; Michurenkov; Glushkov (?); Glushkov; Michurenkov; Michurenkov; Korotayev; Kabutov

19 January 2014 Mid-season	Rotor Volgograd	1–3	Ufa	(Cyprus) Ayia Napa
	1:1 Korotayev		0:1 Nagibin; 1:2 Golubov; 1:3 Yakupov

22 January 2014 Mid-season	AEZ Zakakiou (Cyprus)	0–8	(Russia) Rotor Volgograd	Cyprus
			0:1 Bayramyan; 0:2 Bayramyan; Glushkov (penalty missed) 51'; 0:3 Zinin; 0:4 Michurenkov; 0:5 Glushkov; 0:6 Michurenkov; 0:7 Kabutov; 0:8 Korotayev

28 January 2014 Mid-season	Zhetysu (Kazakhstan)	4–2	(Russia) Rotor Volgograd	(Turkey) Belek
	Zarechniy; Khmaladze; Totay; Nusipzhanov		3:1 Appayev; 4:2 Appayev

2 February 2014 Mid-season	Rotor Volgograd (Russia)	2–2	(Kazakhstan) Aktobe	(Turkey) Belek
	1:0 Fomin; 2:1 Malygin (?)		1:1 Tagibergen; 2:2 Logvinenko

4 February 2014 Mid-season	Rotor Volgograd (Russia)	0–1	(Ukraine) Metalurh Donetsk	(Turkey) Belek
			0:1 Lazić 53'	Referee: (Poland) Tomasz Wajda

6 February 2014 Mid-season	Rotor Volgograd (Russia)	0–2	(Moldova) Milsami	(Turkey) Belek
			0:1 Boghiu 38'; 0:2 Boghiu 59' (pen.)

8 February 2014 Mid-season	Tavriya Simferopol (Ukraine)	0–0	(Russia) Rotor Volgograd	(Turkey) Belek

18 February 2014 Mid-season	Rotor Volgograd	3–1	Yenisey Krasnoyarsk	(Turkey) Belek
	1:0 Appayev 22'; 2:0 Korotayev 51'; 3:0 Rylov 62'		3:1 Lescano 84' (pen.)

21 February 2014 Mid-season	Krasnodar	1–1	Rotor Volgograd	(Turkey) Belek
	1:0 Ari 12'		1:1 Malygin 51'	Referee: (Lithuania) Gediminas Mažeika

24 February 2014 Mid-season	Rotor Volgograd	3–3	Lokomotiv Moscow (reserve)	(Turkey) Belek
	1:0 Pugin 15'; 2:3 Pugin 80'; 3:3 Michurenkov 85'	Summary	1:1 Lomakin 27'; 1:2 Chukanov 35'; 1:3 Pogonin 65'

24 February 2014 Mid-season	Pakhtakor Tashkent (Uzbekistan)	1–4	(Russia) Rotor Volgograd	(Turkey) Belek
	1:2 Sergeev		0:1 Appayev 22'; 0:2 Rylov 52'; 1:3 Malygin 63' (pen.); 1:4 Kabutov 67'

28 February 2014 Mid-season	Rotor Volgograd	1–0	Znamya Truda Orekhovo-Zuyevo	(Turkey) Belek
	1:0 Mikheyev

28 February 2014 Mid-season (not completed)	Rotor Volgograd (Russia)	0–0	(Belarus) Naftan Novopolotsk	(Turkey) Belek

9 March 2014 Mid-season	Olimpia Volgograd	1–5	Rotor Volgograd	Volgograd
	1:3 Kaloshin 63' (pen.)		0:1 Lamanje 41'; 0:2 Appayev 43'; 0:3 Appayev 45' (pen.); 1:4 Rylov 88'; 1:5 Bayramyan 90'	Stadium: Elektronik; Attendance: 150

=== Russian National Football League ===
==== Results ====
7 July 2013 1	Yenisey Krasnoyarsk	1–4	Rotor Volgograd	Krasnoyarsk
15:00 MSK (UTC+4)	1:3 Lescano 63'	Summary	0:1 Stavpets 16'; 0:2 Stavpets 31'; 0:3 Rylov 34'; 1:4 Kamarowski 74'	Stadium: Tsentralniy; Attendance: 4,100; Referee: Sergei Kulikov (Saransk)

13 July 2013 2	Rotor Volgograd	1–2	SKA-Energiya Khabarovsk	Volgograd
19:00 MSK (UTC+4)	1:2 Stavpets 52'	Summary	0:1 Murnin 9'; 0:2 Murnin 50'	Stadium: Tsentralniy; Attendance: 10,200; Referee: Aleksei Matyunin (Moscow)

19 July 2013 3	Gazovik Orenburg	0–0	Rotor Volgograd	Orenburg
17:00 MSK (UTC+4)		Summary		Stadium: Gazovik; Attendance: 3,500; Referee: Mikhail Vilkov (Nizhny Novgorod)

23 July 2013 4	Rotor Volgograd	2–0	Shinnik Yaroslavl	Volgograd
19:30 MSK (UTC+4)	1:0 Appayev 19'; 2:0 Arkhipov 90+' (pen.)	Summary		Stadium: Tsentralniy; Attendance: 9,000; Referee: Vasili Miroshnichenko (Rostov-on-Don)

28 July 2013 5	Khimik Dzerzhinsk	1–0	Rotor Volgograd	Dzerzhinsk
18:30 MSK (UTC+4)	1:0 Manukovskiy 80' (pen.)	Summary		Stadium: Khimik; Attendance: 4,000; Referee: Kirill Levnikov (St. Petersburg)

2 August 2013 6	Rotor Volgograd	1–1	Ufa	Volgograd
19:00 MSK (UTC+4)	1:1 Fomin 49'; Voydel (penalty missed) 90+'	Summary	0:1 Diego Carlos 45'	Stadium: Tsentralniy; Attendance: 8,500; Referee: Maksim Layushkin (Moscow)

7 August 2013 7	Angusht Nazran	0–2	Rotor Volgograd	Nazran
17:00 MSK (UTC+4)		Summary	0:1 Appayev 12'; 0:2 Malygin 49'	Stadium: Tsentralniy; Attendance: 1,500; Referee: Vladimir Kazmenko (Rostov-on-Don)

12 August 2013 8	Rotor Volgograd	0–0	Neftekhimik Nizhnekamsk	Volgograd
19:00 MSK (UTC+4)		Summary		Stadium: Tsentralniy; Attendance: 8,500; Referee: Igor Fedotov (Moscow)

18 August 2013 9	Alania Vladikavkaz	2–1	Rotor Volgograd	Vladikavkaz
18:00 MSK (UTC+4)	1:0 Tskhovrebov 11'; 2:0 Martsvaladze 50'	Summary	2:1 Arkhipov 59'	Stadium: Spartak; Attendance: 4,000; Referee: Vladimir Moskalyov (Voronezh)

28 August 2013 11	Baltika Kaliningrad	0–2	Rotor Volgograd	Kaliningrad
20:00 MSK (UTC+4)		Summary	0:1 Fomin 59'; 0:2 Kamarowski 82'	Stadium: Baltika; Attendance: 4,700; Referee: Roman Galimov (Ulan-Ude)

5 September 2013 12	Rotor Volgograd	0–2	Luch-Energiya Vladivostok	Volgograd
19:00 MSK (UTC+4)		Summary	0:1 Krendelew 44'; 0:2 Mikhalyov 85'	Stadium: Tsentralniy; Attendance: 4,300; Referee: Igor Nizovtsev (Nizhny Novgorod)

10 September 2013 13	Salyut Belgorod	1–0	Rotor Volgograd	Belgorod
19:00 MSK (UTC+4)	1:0 Mikheyev 11'	Summary		Stadium: Salyut; Attendance: 2,400; Referee: Vladimir Rogulev (Lomonosov)

16 September 2013 14	Spartak-Nalchik	1–1	Rotor Volgograd	Nalchik
18:00 MSK (UTC+4)	1:0 Glushkov 60' (ag.)	Summary	1:1 Arkhipov 84'	Stadium: Spartak; Attendance: 1,050; Referee: Mikhail Vilkov (Nizhny Novgorod)

22 September 2013 15	Rotor Volgograd	1–2	Torpedo Moscow	Volgograd
17:00 MSK (UTC+4)	1:0 Vasyanovich 3'	Summary	1:1 Bagayev 39'; 1:2 Mikuckis 60'	Stadium: Tsentralniy; Attendance: 5,000; Referee: Vladimir Moskalyov (Voronezh)

1 October 2013 16	Arsenal Tula	4–0	Rotor Volgograd	Tula
19:00 MSK (UTC+4)	1:0 Smirnov 11'; 2:0 Kutyin 32'; 3:0 Ignatyev 35'; 4:0 Savin 38'	Summary		Stadium: Arsenal; Attendance: 10,200; Referee: Sergei Kostevich (Kursk)

7 October 2013 17	Rotor Volgograd	1–1	Mordovia Saransk	Volgograd
19:00 MSK (UTC+4)	1:1 Lukjanovs 34'	Summary	0:1 Bobyor 14'	Stadium: Tsentralniy; Attendance: 2,800; Referee: Sergei Ivanov (Rostov-on-Don)

13 October 2013 18	Dynamo Saint Petersburg	0–0	Rotor Volgograd	Saint Petersburg
14:00 MSK (UTC+4)		Summary		Stadium: MSA Petrovsky; Attendance: 1,300; Referee: Vyacheslav Popov (Yekaterinburg)

18 October 2013 19	Rotor Volgograd	0–2	Sibir Novosibirsk	Volgograd
19:00 MSK (UTC+4)		Summary	0:1 Ryzhkov 47'; 0:2 Markosov 72'	Stadium: Tsentralniy; Attendance: 3,000; Referee: Vladimir Kazmenko (Rostov-on-Don)

23 October 2013 20	SKA-Energiya Khabarovsk	0–0	Rotor Volgograd	Khabarovsk
07:00 MSK (UTC+4)		Summary		Stadium: Lenin; Attendance: 2,000; Referee: Evgeni Turbin (Moscow)

27 October 2013 21	Rotor Volgograd	1–1	Gazovik Orenburg	Volgograd
16:00 MSK (UTC+4)	1:1 Voydel 90'	Summary	0:1 Ivannikov 77'	Stadium: Tsentralniy; Attendance: 3,000; Referee: Timur Arslanbekov (Moscow)

4 November 2013 22	Shinnik Yaroslavl	1–0	Rotor Volgograd	Yaroslavl
15:00 MSK (UTC+4)	1:0 Karytska 88' (pen.)	Summary		Stadium: Shinnik; Attendance: 0 Referee: Vladimir Rogulev (Lomonosov)

10 November 2013 23	Rotor Volgograd	3 – 0^{1}	Khimik Dzerzhinsk	Volgograd
16:00 MSK (UTC+4)	1:0 Stavpets 25' (pen.); 2:0 Bayramyan 90+'	Summary		Stadium: Tsentralniy; Attendance: 3,300; Referee: Aleksei Matyunin (Moscow)

17 November 2013 24	Ufa	3–2	Rotor Volgograd	Ufa
13:00 MSK (UTC+4)	1:1 Golubov 54'; 2:1 Diego Carlos 57'; 3:1 Lamanje 68' (ag.)	Summary	0:1 Osipov 40' (ag.); 3:2 Stavpets 84' (pen.)	Stadium: Dynamo; Attendance: 2,000; Referee: Sergei Kulikov (Saransk)

23 November 2013 25	Rotor Volgograd	3–0	Angusht Nazran	Volgograd
14:00 MSK (UTC+4)	1:0 Stavpets 1'; 2:0 Appayev 31' (pen.); 3:0 Bayramyan 64'	Summary		Stadium: Tsentralniy; Attendance: 2,500; Referee: Anton Anopa (Blagoveshchensk)

9 March 2014 26	Rotor Volgograd	3 – 0^{2}	Alania Vladikavkaz	Volgograd
				Stadium: Tsentralniy

17 March 2014 27	Neftekhimik Nizhnekamsk	2–1	Rotor Volgograd	Kazan
14:00 MSK (UTC+4)	1:0 Umarbaev 23'; 2:1 Kosyanchuk 82'	Summary	1:1 Rylov 62'	Stadium: Rubin; Attendance: 1,500; Referee: Aleksei Sukhoy (Lyubertsy)

31 March 2014 29	Rotor Volgograd	1–2	Baltika Kaliningrad	Volgograd
14:30 MSK (UTC+4)	1:2 Pugin 81'	Summary	0:1 Kalenkovich 42'; 0:2 Votinov 64'	Stadium: Tsentralniy; Attendance: 1,100; Referee: German Kravchenko (Pskov)

4 April 2014 30	Luch-Energiya Vladivostok	2–1	Rotor Volgograd	Vladivostok
12:00 MSK (UTC+4)	1:0 Koryan 5'; 2:0 Klopkov 42'	Summary	2:1 Kabutov 68'	Stadium: Dynamo; Attendance: 4,500; Referee: Aleksei Yeskov (Moscow)

9 April 2014 31	Rotor Volgograd	3 – 0^{2}	Salyut Belgorod	Volgograd
				Stadium: Tsentralniy

14 April 2014 32	Rotor Volgograd	2–2	Spartak-Nalchik	Volgograd
19:00 MSK (UTC+4)	Pugin (penalty missed) 48'; 1:1 Bayramyan 48'; 2:1 Fomin 62'	Summary	0:1 Kireyev 30'; 2:2 Kireyev 76'	Stadium: Tsentralniy; Attendance: 4,100; Referee: Sergey Lapochkin (St. Petersburg)

20 April 2014 33	Torpedo Moscow	1–0	Rotor Volgograd	Ramenskoye
15:00 MSK (UTC+4)	Aydov (penalty missed) 61'; 1:0 Tesák 61'	Summary		Stadium: Saturn; Attendance: 2,500; Referee: Igor Nizovtsev (Nizhny Novgorod)

25 April 2014 34	Rotor Volgograd	1–1	Arsenal Tula	Volgograd
18:30 MSK (UTC+4)	1:1 Appayev 79' (pen.)	Summary	0:1 Kaleshin 68'	Stadium: Tsentralniy; Attendance: 5,100; Referee: Sergei Kulikov (Saransk)

30 April 2014 35	Mordovia Saransk	2–0	Rotor Volgograd	Saransk
18:00 MSK (UTC+4)	1:0 Mukhametshin 20'; 2:0 Ivanov 55'	Summary		Stadium: Start; Attendance: 3,000; Referee: Anton Anopa (Blagoveshchensk)

5 May 2014 36	Rotor Volgograd	3–1	Dynamo Saint Petersburg	Volgograd
19:00 MSK (UTC+4)	1:0 Ten 17' (pen.); 2:0 Myazin 37'; 3:0 Pugin 40'	Summary	3:1 Biryukov 78'	Stadium: Tsentralniy; Attendance: 3,800; Referee: Lasha Verulidze (Vladikavkaz)

11 May 2014 37	Sibir Novosibirsk	2–2	Rotor Volgograd	Novosibirsk
14:00 MSK (UTC+4)	1:0 Cebotaru 14' (pen.); 2:0 Vychodil 24'	Summary	2:1 Kabutov 36'; 2:2 Appayev 45' (pen.)	Stadium: Spartak; Attendance: 2,700; Referee: Roman Galimov (Ulan-Ude)

15 May 2014 38	Rotor Volgograd	1–0	Yenisey Krasnoyarsk	Volgograd
19:00 MSK (UTC+4)	Malygin (penalty missed) 29'; 1:0 Kabutov 90+'	Summary		Stadium: Tsentralniy; Attendance: 13,100; Referee: Evgeni Turbin (Moscow)

==== Table ====
Pos	Team	Pld	W	D	L	GF	GA	GD	Pts
1	Mordovia Saransk	36	22	7	7	59	30	+29	73
2	Arsenal Tula	36	21	6	9	62	39	+23	69
3	Torpedo Moscow	36	19	8	9	45	22	+23	65
4	Ufa	36	17	10	9	46	35	+11	61
5	Gazovik Orenburg	36	17	10	9	46	28	+18	61
6	Shinnik Yaroslavl	36	17	6	13	47	37	+10	57
7	SKA-Energiya Khabarovsk	36	15	11	10	43	34	+9	56
8	Luch-Energiya Vladivostok	36	15	10	11	40	25	+15	55
9	Baltika Kaliningrad	36	14	12	10	39	31	+8	54
10	Spartak-Nalchik	36	13	12	11	36	34	+2	51
11	Sibir Novosibirsk	36	13	12	11	38	39	−1	51
12	Alania Vladikavkaz	36	14	4	18	29	55	−26	46
13	Yenisey Krasnoyarsk	36	12	9	15	40	47	−7	45
14	Dynamo Saint Petersburg	36	12	7	17	38	46	−8	43
15	Rotor Volgograd	36	10	11	15	43	40	+3	41
16	Khimik Dzerzhinsk	36	10	7	19	29	49	−20	37
17	Neftekhimik Nizhnekamsk	36	7	12	17	38	45	−7	33
18	Salyut Belgorod	36	6	9	21	23	56	−33	27
19	Angusht Nazran	36	3	5	28	23	78	−55	14

Promoted
Promotion play-offs
Relegated
Excluded

=== Russian Cup ===
1 September 2013 Fourth Round	Torpedo Armavir	0–1	Rotor Volgograd	Armavir
17:00 MSK (UTC+4)		Summary	0:1 Korotayev 35'	Stadium: Yunost; Attendance: 2,500; Referee: Artyom Chistyakov (Azov)

30 October 2013 Round of 32	Rotor Volgograd	0–0 (a.e.t.) (4–3 p)	Lokomotiv Moscow	Volgograd
19:00 MSK (UTC+4)		Summary		Stadium: Tsentralniy; Attendance: 13,500; Referee: Kirill Levnikov (St. Petersburg)
	Penalties
	Aleksandr Stavpets 1:0 (penalty scored); Roman Voydel 1:1 (penalty missed); Dmitri Kabutov 2:1 (penalty scored); Pyotr Ten 3:2 (penalty scored); Aleksandr Malygin 4:3 (penalty scored)		(penalty missed) 0:0 Felipe Caicedo; (penalty scored) 1:1 Roman Pavlyuchenko; (penalty missed) 1:1 Magomed Ozdoyev; (penalty scored) 2:2 Taras Burlak; (penalty scored) 3:3 Roman Shishkin

2 March 2014 Round of 16	Rotor Volgograd	3 – 0^{2}	Salyut Belgorod	Volgograd
				Stadium: Tsentralniy

26 March 2014 Round of 8	Rostov	3–0	Rotor Volgograd	Rostov-on-Don
20:00 MSK (UTC+4)	1:0 Gațcan 8'; 2:0 Ananidze 60'; 3:0 Dzyuba 75' (pen.)	Summary		Stadium: Olimp-2; Attendance: 13,200; Referee: Timur Arslanbekov (Moscow)

Notes:

- Note 1: 20 December 2013 at a meeting of the RFU Control and Disciplinary committee of the decided to deduct FC Khimik Dzerzhinsk defeat with the score 0–3 in the 23 match Russian National Football League Rotor Volgograd – Khimik Dzerzhinsk, which ended 2–0. The reason for this decision was the appearance on the field Ukrainian forward Oleksandr Kasyan, who had no right to do so.
- Note 2: Salyut Belgorod and Alania Vladikavkaz got defeated by a score of 0–3, due to withdraw from the competition due to financial problems.

== Squad statistics ==
=== Appearances and goals ===
No.	Pos	Nat	Player	Total		RNFL		Russian Cup	
No.	Pos	Nat	Player	Apps	Goals	Apps	Goals	Apps	Goals
16	GK	(Russia) RUS	Denis Pchelintsev	32	-32	30	-29	2	-3
35	GK	(Russia) RUS	Denis Kniga	1	-2	1	-2	0	0
77	GK	(Russia) RUS	Aleksandr Bondar	0	0	0	0	0	0
33	DF	(France) FRA	Abdel Lamanje	36	0	33	0	3	0
14	DF	(Russia) RUS	Pyotr Ten	30	1	28	1	2	0
5	DF	(Russia) RUS	Dmitri Guz	28	0	25	0	3	0
66	DF	(Russia) RUS	Vitali Ustinov	28	0	25	0	3	0
6	DF	(Ukraine) UKR	Aleksandr Malygin	20	1	18	1	2	0
88	DF	(Russia) RUS	Ilya Zinin	12	0	11	0	1	0
31	DF	(Russia) RUS	Andrei Vasyanovich	9	1	9	1	0	0
27	DF	(Russia) RUS	Mikhail Merkulov	3	0	2	0	1	0
10	MF	(Russia) RUS	Artur Rylov	37	2	34	2	3	0
4	MF	(Russia) RUS	Semyon Fomin	33	3	30	3	3	0
20	MF	(Russia) RUS	Roman Voydel	28	1	26	1	2	0
87	MF	(Latvia) LAT	Ivans Lukjanovs	20	1	18	1	2	0
17	MF	(Russia) RUS	Khoren Bayramyan	17	3	16	3	1	0
8	MF	(Russia) RUS	Aleksei Pugin	18	2	16	2	2	0
22	MF	(Russia) RUS	Nikita Glushkov	10	0	10	0	0	0
29	MF	(Russia) RUS	Maksim Yakovlev	10	0	9	0	1	0
23	MF	(Russia) RUS	Andrei Mikheyev	8	0	7	0	1	0
9	FW	(Russia) RUS	Khyzyr Appayev	34	5	32	5	2	0
92	FW	(Russia) RUS	Dmitri Kabutov	20	3	17	3	3	0
13	FW	(Russia) RUS	Aleksandr Korotayev	15	1	14	0	1	1
19	FW	(Russia) RUS	Andrei Myazin	10	1	10	1	0	0
	FW	(Russia) RUS	Dmitri Michurenkov	0	0	0	0	0	0
Players who completed the season with other clubs:
1	GK	(Belarus) BLR	Illya Hawrylaw	5	-9	4	-9	1	0
3	DF	(Russia) RUS	Stepan Ryabokon	1	0	1	0	0	0
2	DF	(Russia) RUS	Ilya Ionov	0	0	0	0	0	0
30	MF	(Belarus) BLR	Dzmitry Kamarowski	15	2	14	2	1	0
18	MF	(Russia) RUS	Aleksandr Nechayev	3	0	3	0	0	0
11	FW	(Russia) RUS	Aleksandr Stavpets	25	6	23	6	2	0
7	FW	(Russia) RUS	Anton Arkhipov	17	3	16	3	1	0
	FW	(Russia) RUS	Vladislav Khrushchak	0	0	0	0	0	0

=== Top scorers ===
Player	RNFL	Russian Cup	Total
Aleksandr Stavpets	6	0	6
Khyzyr Appayev	5	0	5
Khoren Bayramyan	3	0	3
Dmitri Kabutov	3	0	3
Semyon Fomin	3	0	3
Anton Arkhipov	3	0	3
Dzmitry Kamarowski	2	0	2
Aleksei Pugin	2	0	2
Artur Rylov	2	0	2
Andrei Myazin	1	0	1
Andrei Vasyanovich	1	0	1
Aleksandr Malygin	1	0	1
Ivans Lukjanovs	1	0	1
Roman Voydel	1	0	1
Pyotr Ten	1	0	1
Aleksandr Korotayev	0	1	1
Autogoals opponent	1	0	1
Total	36	1	37

=== Disciplinary record ===
Player	RNFL			Russian Cup			Total		
Player	Yellow card	(yellow card) (red card)	Red card	Yellow card	(yellow card) (red card)	Red card	Yellow card	(yellow card) (red card)	Red card
Roman Voydel	7	0	0	0	0	0	7	0	0
Semyon Fomin	6	0	0	1	0	0	7	0	0
Dmitri Guz	5	1	0	1	0	0	6	1	0
Pyotr Ten	6	0	0	0	0	0	6	0	0
Anton Arkhipov	5	0	0	0	0	0	5	0	0
Aleksandr Malygin	4	0	0	0	0	0	4	0	0
Khyzyr Appayev	4	0	0	0	0	0	4	0	0
Vitali Ustinov	3	0	0	1	0	0	4	0	0
Maksim Yakovlev	3	0	0	0	0	0	3	0	0
Nikita Glushkov	3	0	0	0	0	0	3	0	0
Ivans Lukjanovs	3	0	0	0	0	0	3	0	0
Artur Rylov	3	0	0	0	0	0	3	0	0
Ilya Zinin	2	0	0	1	0	0	3	0	0
Abdel Lamanje	2	1	0	0	0	0	2	1	0
Aleksandr Korotayev	2	0	0	0	0	0	2	0	0
Aleksei Pugin	2	0	0	0	0	0	2	0	0
Aleksandr Stavpets	2	0	0	0	0	0	2	0	0
Denis Pchelintsev	1	0	1	0	0	0	1	0	1
Denis Kniga	1	0	0	0	0	0	1	0	0
Khoren Bayramyan	1	0	0	0	0	0	1	0	0
Dmitri Kabutov	1	0	0	0	0	0	1	0	0
Andrei Vasyanovich	1	0	0	0	0	0	1	0	0
Dzmitry Kamarowski	1	0	0	0	0	0	1	0	0
Illya Hawrylaw	0	0	0	1	0	0	1	0	0
Total	68	2	1	5	0	0	73	2	1

== Team statistics ==
=== Home attendance ===
Date	Round	Attendance	Opposition	Stadium
13 July 2013	Round 2	10,200	SKA-Energiya Khabarovsk	Tsentralniy
23 July 2013	Round 4	9,000	Shinnik Yaroslavl	Tsentralniy
2 August 2013	Round 6	8,500	Ufa	Tsentralniy
12 August 2013	Round 8	8,500	Neftekhimik Nizhnekamsk	Tsentralniy
5 September 2013	Round 12	4,300	Luch-Energiya Vladivostok	Tsentralniy
22 September 2013	Round 15	5,000	Torpedo Moscow	Tsentralniy
7 October 2013	Round 17	2,800	Mordovia Saransk	Tsentralniy
18 October 2013	Round 19	3,000	Sibir Novosibirsk	Tsentralniy
27 October 2013	Round 21	3,000	Gazovik Orenburg	Tsentralniy
30 October 2013	Round of 32 RC	13,500	Lokomotiv Moscow	Tsentralniy
10 November 2013	Round 23	3,300	Khimik Dzerzhinsk	Tsentralniy
23 November 2013	Round 25	2,500	Angusht Nazran	Tsentralniy
31 March 2014	Round 29	1,100	Baltika Kaliningrad	Tsentralniy
14 April 2014	Round 32	4,100	Spartak-Nalchik	Tsentralniy
25 April 2014	Round 34	5,100	Arsenal Tula	Tsentralniy
5 May 2014	Round 36	3,800	Dynamo Saint Petersburg	Tsentralniy
15 May 2014	Round 38	13,100	Yenisey Krasnoyarsk	Tsentralniy
Total	100,800			
Average	5,929			

Note: bold type font are the highest attendance in round.

==== General statistics ====
Tournament	Pld	W	D	L	GF	GA	GD	YC	2YC	RC	Pts
RNFL	36	10	11	15	43	40	+3	68	2	1	41/108 (37,9 %)
Russian Cup	4	3	0	1	4	3	+1	5	0	0	9/12 (75%)
Total	40	13	11	16	47	43	+4	73	2	1	50/120 (41,6 %)
