= 2013–14 Russian Cup =

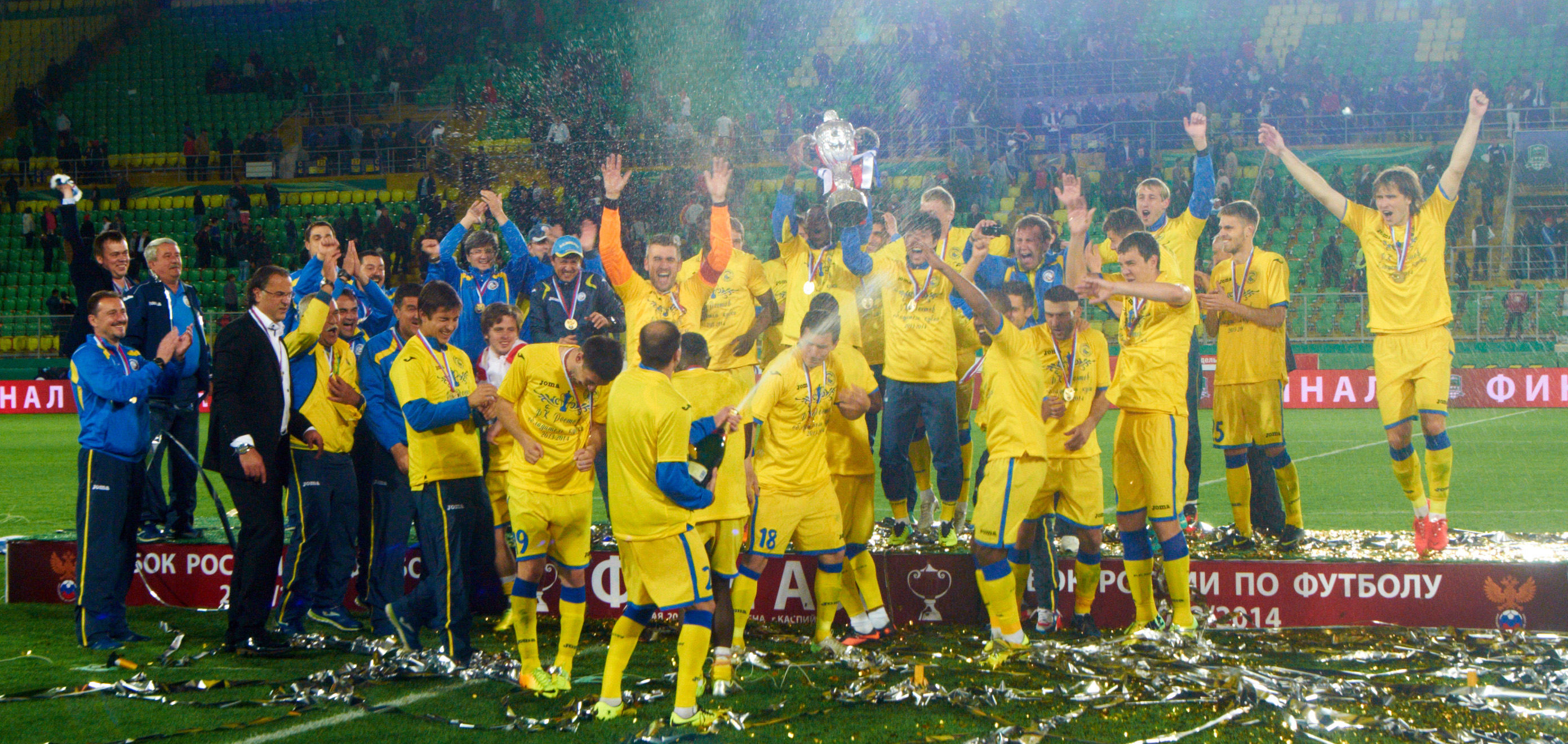
- Victors of the Pirelli Russian Cup 2013-14

Tournament details
- Country: Russia
- Teams: 110

Final positions
- Champions: Rostov (1st title)
- Runners-up: Krasnodar

Tournament statistics
- Top goal scorer: Jeremy Bokila (5 goals)

The 2013–14 Russian Cup, known as the 2013–14 Pirelli–Russian Football Cup for sponsorship reasons, was the 22nd season of the Russian football knockout tournament since the dissolution of Soviet Union.

The competition started on 7 July 2013. The cup champion wins a spot in the 2014–15 UEFA Europa League play-off round.

== First round ==
The matches were played between 7 and 16 July 2013.

Team 1	Score	Team 2
7 July 2013
Dagdizel Kaspiysk (3)	2–0	Druzhba Maykop (3)
MITOS Novocherkassk (3)	3–1	SKA Rostov (3)
Vityaz Krymsk (3)	2–1	Biolog-Novokubansk Progress (3)
Olimpia Volgograd (3)	2–4	Energiya Volzhsky (3)
10 July 2013
Dynamo Kostroma (4)	1–1 (a.e.t.) (3–1 p)	Spartak Kostroma (3)
Tekstilshchik Ivanovo (3)	4–2	Torpedo Vladimir (3)
Trevis & VVK St. Petersburg (4)	0–1	Rus Saint Petersburg (3)
Kolomna (3)	1–2	Znamya Trude Orekhovo-Zuyevo (3)
Zenit Moscow (4)	0–6	Strogino Moscow (3)
Tosno (3)	2–0	Dynamo Vologda (3)
Volga Tver (3)	1–2	Dnepr Smolensk (3)
11 July 2013
Zvezda Ryazan (3)	3–0	Tambov (3)
Khimik Novomoskovsk (4)	0–3	Podolye Podolsky district (3)
Metallurg-Oskol Stary Oskol (3)	1–2	Lokomotiv Liski (3)
Dynamo Bryansk (3)	0–0 (a.e.t.) (12–11 p)	Oryol (3)
12 July 2013
Oktan Perm (3)	0–1	Dynamo Kirov (3)
Spartak Yoshkar-Ola (3)	0–1	Rubin-2 Kazan (3)
Lada (3)	1–0	KAMAZ (3)
Syzran-2003 (3)	1–0	Nosta Novotroitsk (3)
Chelyabinsk (3)	2–1 (a.e.t.)	Tobol Tobolsk (4)
16 July 2013
Chita (3)	3–1	Baikal Irkutsk (3)
Sibir-2 Novosibirsk (3)	0–3	Shakhta Raspadskaya Mezhdurechensk (4)
Belogorsk (4)	0–0 (a.e.t.) (5–4 p)	Smena Komsomolsk-na-Amure (3)

== Second round ==
The matches were played between 22 and 31 July 2013.

Team 1	Score	Team 2
22 July 2013
Tyumen (3)	2–0	Chelyabinsk (3)
Dynamo Kirov (3)	0–1 (a.e.t.)	Zenit Izhevsk (3)
Rubin-2 Kazan (3)	1–4	Volga Ulyanovsk (3)
Syzran-2003 (3)	2–1	Lada (3)
26 July 2013
Alaniya II (3)	0–2	Dagdizel Kaspiysk (3)
Gazprom transgaz Stavropol Ryzdvyany (3)	3–1	Mashuk-KMV (3)
Volgar Astrakhan (3)	2–0	Astrakhan (3)
Taganrog (3)	0–2	MITOS Novocherkassk (3)
Energiya Volzhsky (3)	1–3 (a.e.t.)	Torpedo Armavir (3)
Metallurg Vyksa (3)	1–3	Metallurg Lipetsk (3)
Kaluga (3)	1–2	Zvezda Ryazan (3)
Chernomorets (3)	1–3 (a.e.t.)	Vityaz Krymsk (3)
Avangard Kursk (3)	2–0	Dynamo Bryansk (3)
Podolye Podolsky district (3)	0–1	Vityaz Podolsk (3)
Lokomotiv Liski (3)	3–0	Fakel (3)
Zenit Penza (3)	0–4	Sokol Saratov (3)
30 July 2013
Sakhalin Yuzhno-Sakhalinsk (3)	1–1 (a.e.t.) (2–4 p)	Yakutiya Yakutsk (3)
Sibiryak Bratsk (3)	0–1	Chita (3)
Amur-2010 (3)	0–1 (a.e.t.)	Belogorsk (4)
Shakhta Raspadskaya Mezhdurechensk (4)	1–1 (a.e.t.) (2–4 p)	Irtysh Omsk (3)
31 July 2013
Rus Saint Petersburg (3)	0–3	Sever Murmansk (3)
Znamya Trude Orekhovo-Zuyevo (3)	1–2	Dolgoprudny (3)
Dnepr Smolensk (3)	0–1	Khimki (3)
Tekstilshchik Ivanovo (3)	2–1 (a.e.t.)	Dynamo Kostroma (4)
Pskov-747 Pskov (3)	2–2 (a.e.t.) (6–7 p)	Tosno (3)
Strogino Moscow (3)	2–1 (a.e.t.)	Lokomotiv-2 Moscow (3)

== Third round ==
The matches were played between 10 and 21 August 2013.

Team 1	Score	Team 2
10 August 2013
Yakutiya Yakutsk (3)	2–1	Belogorsk (4)
11 August 2013
Sever Murmansk (3)	0–3	Tosno (3)
Dolgoprudny (3)	2–1	Strogino Moscow (3)
Khimki (3)	2–1	Tekstilshchik Ivanovo (3)
13 August 2013
Dagdizel Kaspiysk (3)	2–1	Gazprom transgaz Stavropol Ryzdvyany (3)
Torpedo Armavir (3)	1–0	Vityaz Krymsk (3)
MITOS Novocherkassk (3)	4–0	Volgar Astrakhan (3)
Metallurg Lipetsk (3)	2–2 (a.e.t.) (11–12 p)	Sokol Saratov (3)
Lokomotiv Liski (3)	0–1	Avangard Kursk (3)
Vityaz Podolsk (3)	1–2	Zvezda Ryazan (3)
17 August 2013
Tyumen (3)	0–0 (a.e.t.) (5–4 p)	Syzran-2003 (3)
Zenit Izhevsk (3)	2–1	Volga Ulyanovsk (3)
21 August 2013
Irtysh Omsk (3)	1–0	Chita (3)

== Fourth round ==
The 13 winners from the third round and the 19 FNL teams entered this round. The matches were played on 31 August and 1 September 2013.

Team 1	Score	Team 2
31 August 2013
Dagdizel Kaspiysk (3)	0–1	Angusht Nazran (2)
Tyumen (3)	1–1 (a.e.t.) (5–3 p)	Yenisey Krasnoyarsk (2)
Spartak Nalchik (2)	1–2 (a.e.t.)	Alania Vladikavkaz (2)
Zenit Izhevsk (3)	1–1 (a.e.t.) (3–4 p)	Mordovia Saransk (2)
Zvezda Ryazan (3)	2–1 (a.e.t.)	Torpedo Moscow (2)
Avangard Kursk (3)	1–2	Khimik Dzerzhinsk (2)
1 September 2013
Yakutiya Yakutsk (3)	0–3	SKA-Energiya Khabarovsk (2)
Khimki (3)	1–2	Shinnik Yaroslavl (2)
Irtysh Omsk (3)	1–2 (a.e.t.)	Luch-Energiya Vladivostok (2)
Gazovik Orenburg (2)	1–0	Sibir Novosibirsk (2)
Ufa (2)	0–1 (a.e.t.)	Neftekhimik Nizhnekamsk (2)
MITOS Novocherkassk (3)	1–3	Salyut Belgorod (2)
Torpedo Armavir (3)	0–1	Rotor Volgograd (2)
Tosno (3)	1–0 (a.e.t.)	Dynamo St. Petersburg (2)
Sokol Saratov (3)	0–0 (a.e.t.) (3–1 p)	Arsenal Tula (2)
Dolgoprudny (3)	1–1 (a.e.t.) (3–1 p)	Baltika Kaliningrad (2)

== Fifth round ==
Teams from the Russian Football Premier League enter at this stage of the competition.

31 October 2013	Alania Vladikavkaz (2)	1–0	Anzhi Makhachkala (1)	Vladikavkaz
17:00	Bakayev 77'			Stadium: Republican Spartak Stadium; Attendance: 9,500; Referee: Igor Fedotov

30 October 2013	Angusht Nazran (2)	0–1	Rostov (1)	Nazran
15:00	Guguyev (yellow card) 88' (yellow-red card)		Vasilyev 5'	Stadium: Rashid Aushev Central Stadium; Attendance: 2,600; Referee: Aleksei Matyunin

30 October 2013	Dolgoprudny (3)	1–4	Krasnodar (1)	Dolgoprudny
18:30	Puchkov (penalty missed); Zvyagin 32'		Isael 13'; Pizzelli 17', 90+1'; Gohou 56'	Stadium: Salyut Stadium; Attendance: 2,700; Referee: Vladimir Moskalyov

30 October 2013	Gazovik Orenburg (2)	0–1 (a.e.t.)	Tom Tomsk (1)	Orenburg
15:00			Astafyev 118'	Stadium: Gazovik Stadium; Attendance: 3,800; Referee: Vladimir Kazmenko

30 October 2013	Khimik Dzerzhinsk (2)	1–2	CSKA Moscow (1)	Dzerzhinsk
16:00	Yerkin 51' (pen.); Kasyan (red card) 74'		Bazelyuk 20'; Kichin 29' (o.g.)	Stadium: Khimik Stadium; Attendance: 3,000; Referee: Vasily Kazartsev

30 October 2013	Luch-Energiya Vladivostok (2)	4–2	Rubin Kazan (1)	Vladivostok
11:30	Dorozhkin 3', 54'; Krendelew 36'; Mogilevskiy 45'		Mukhametshin 15'; Karadeniz 71'	Stadium: Dynamo Stadium; Attendance: 7,450; Referee: Mikhail Belov

30 October 2013	Mordovia Saransk (2)	2–2 (a.e.t.) (4–3 p)	Amkar Perm (1)	Saransk
18:30	Perendija 53'; Dimidko 57'		Nijholt 19'; Kayumov 50'	Stadium: Start Stadium; Attendance: 3,100; Referee: Vyacheslav Kharlamov
	Penalties
	Budnikov (penalty scored); Pazin (penalty missed); Ivanov (penalty scored); Dimidko (penalty scored); Bobyor (penalty scored)		Peev (penalty missed); Vassiljev (penalty scored); Gol (penalty scored); Sirakov (penalty scored); Georgiev (penalty missed)

31 October 2013	Neftekhimik Nizhnekamsk (2)	1–4	Terek Grozny (1)	Nizhnekamsk
16:30	Drannikov 43'		Maurício 12' (pen.); Grozav 18'; Bokila 55', 85'	Stadium: Neftekhimik Stadium; Attendance: 1,700; Referee: Anton Anopa

30 October 2013	Rotor Volgograd (2)	0–0 (a.e.t.) (4–3 p)	Lokomotiv Moscow (1)	Volgograd
18:30				Stadium: Central Stadium; Attendance: 13,500; Referee: Kirill Levnikov
	Penalties
	Stavpets (penalty scored); Voydel (penalty missed); Kabutov (penalty scored); Ten (penalty scored); Malygin (penalty scored)		Caicedo (penalty missed); Pavlyuchenko (penalty scored); Ozdoev (penalty missed); Burlak (penalty scored); Shishkin (penalty missed)

30 October 2013	Salyut Belgorod (2)	1–0	Dynamo Moscow (1)	Belgorod
18:30	Yakovlev 10'			Stadium: Salyut Stadium; Attendance: 10,300; Referee: Sergey Kulikov

30 October 2013	Shinnik Yaroslavl (2)	0–1	Spartak Moscow (1)	Yaroslavl
18:30			D. Kombarov 72' (pen.)	Stadium: Shinnik Stadium; Attendance: 17,500; Referee: Sergey Kostevich

30 October 2013	SKA-Energiya Khabarovsk (2)	2–0	Volga Nizhny Novgorod (1)	Khabarovsk
08:00	Karmazinenko 27', 76'			Stadium: Lenin Stadium; Attendance: 3,000; Referee: Vyacheslav Popov

31 October 2013	Sokol Saratov (3)	1–1 (a.e.t.) (3–1 p)	Krylia Sovetov Samara (1)	Saratov
17:30	Gonezhukov 88'		Semshov 22'	Stadium: Lokomotiv Stadium; Attendance: 12,920; Referee: Evgeny Turbin
	Penalties
	Dutov (penalty scored); Sapozhkov (penalty scored); Gorbatyuk (penalty scored); Stolyarenko (penalty missed)		Zeballos (penalty scored); Taranov (penalty missed); Goreux (penalty missed); Nadson (penalty missed)

30 October 2013	Tosno (3)	0–0 (a.e.t.) (5–3 p)	Ural Sverdlovsk Oblast (1)	Tosno
14:30				Stadium: Kirovets Stadium; Attendance: 3,600; Referee: Vitaly Rushakov
	Penalties
	Anton Proshin (penalty scored); Zemlyanskiy (penalty scored); Chernukhin (penalty scored); Petukhov (penalty scored); Savin (penalty scored)		Tumasyan (penalty scored); Acevedo (penalty missed); Safronidi (penalty scored); Koman (penalty scored)

30 October 2013	Tyumen (3)	2–0	Zenit Saint Petersburg (1)	Tyumen
18:00	Kanayev 33' (pen.); Serdyukov 45'			Stadium: Geolog Stadium; Attendance: 13,000; Referee: Vladimir Seldyakov

31 October 2013	Zvezda Ryazan (3)	2–2 (a.e.t.) (4–2 p)	Kuban Krasnodar (1)	Ryazan
16:00	Larionov 34'; Artyom Sivayev 84'		Melgarejo 62'; Khubulov 77' (pen.)	Stadium: CSK Stadium; Attendance: 5,700; Referee: Timur Arslanbekov
	Penalties
	Aleksandr Nartikov (penalty missed); Artyom Sivayev (penalty scored); Larionov (penalty scored); Mikhail Zhidkikh (penalty scored); Grushin (penalty scored)		Sosnin (penalty scored); Zhavnerchik (penalty missed); Bueno (penalty missed); Ureña (penalty scored)

== Round of 16 ==
The 16 winners from the fifth round enter. The matches were played in November 2013 - March 2014.

2 March 2014	CSKA Moscow (1)	2–0	Sokol Saratov (3)	Khimki
16:00	Fernandes 24'; Musa 58'			Stadium: Arena Khimki; Attendance: 6,500; Referee: Sergei Ivanov

16 November 2013	Krasnodar (1)	3–2	Zvezda Ryazan (3)	Krasnodar
14:30	Laborde 27', 34'; Wánderson 62'		Mirzov 20'; Artyom Sivayev 44'	Stadium: Kuban Stadium; Attendance: 3,500; Referee: Igor Nizovtsev

28 November 2013	Luch-Energiya Vladivostok (2)	3–2 (a.e.t.)	SKA-Energiya Khabarovsk (2)	Vladivostok
07:00	Katsayev 46'; Romanenko 95'; Koryan 101' (pen.)		Slavnov 90+3'; Radchenko 104'	Stadium: Dynamo Stadium; Attendance: 7,100; Referee: Aleksei Nikolaev

2 March 2014	Rostov (1)	3–0 awarded (Alania withdrew)	Alania Vladikavkaz (2)

2 March 2014	Salyut Belgorod (2)	0–3 awarded (Salyut withdrew)	Rotor Volgograd (2)

12 March 2014	Spartak Moscow (1)	0–1 (a.e.t.)	Tosno (3)	Moscow
19:30			Filatov 113'	Stadium: Lokomotiv Stadium; Attendance: 10,200; Referee: Aleksandr Yegorov

1 March 2014	Terek Grozny (1)	3–2	Mordovia Saransk (2)	Grozny
15:00	Bokila 45', 67', 89'		Samodin 70'; Bobyor 80'	Stadium: Akhmat Arena; Attendance: 17,200; Referee: Igor Fedotov

13 March 2014	Tom Tomsk (1)	2–1	Tyumen (3)	Tomsk
15:30	Saláta 12'; Portnyagin 59' (pen.)		Fursin 80'	Stadium: Trud Stadium; Attendance: 2,500; Referee: Alexei Nikolaev

== Quarter-finals ==
The 8 winners from the round of 16 enter. The matches were played on March 26 and 27, 2014.

27 March 2014	CSKA Moscow (1)	1–0 (a.e.t.)	Terek Grozny (1)	Khimki
20:00	Schennikov 111'		Komorowski (red card) 79'	Stadium: Arena Khimki; Attendance: 8,000; Referee: Vladislav Bezborodov

26 March 2014	Krasnodar (1)	3–0	Tosno (3)	Krasnodar
18:00	Ari 11'; Mamayev 16'; Wánderson 62'			Stadium: Kuban Stadium; Attendance: 12,000; Referee: Igor Fedotov

26 March 2014	Rostov (1)	3–0	Rotor Volgograd (2)	Rostov-on-Don
20:00	Gațcan 9'; Ananidze 60'; Dzyuba 76' (pen.)			Stadium: Olimp – 2 Attendance: 11,000; Referee: Timur Arslanbekov

26 March 2014	Tom Tomsk (1)	1–1 (a.e.t.) (1–2 p)	Luch-Energiya Vladivostok (2)	Novosibirsk
16:00	Portnyagin 33'		Romanovich (yellow card) 45' (yellow-red card); Klopkov 62'	Stadium: Spartak Stadium; Attendance: 700; Referee: Kiril Levnikov
	Penalties
	Portnyagin (penalty missed); Golyshev (penalty missed); Nyakhaychyk (penalty missed); Milanov (penalty missed); Sorokin (penalty scored)		(penalty scored) Koryan; (penalty missed) Klopkov; (penalty missed) Mavletdinov; (penalty missed) Bendz; (penalty scored) Ponomaryov

== Semi-finals ==
The 4 winners from the quarter-finals enter. The matches were played on April 16 and 17, 2014.

16 April 2014	CSKA Moscow (1)	0–1	Krasnodar (1)	Khimki
19:30			Wánderson 28'	Stadium: Arena Khimki; Attendance: 6,000; Referee: Mikhail Vilkov

17 April 2014	Rostov (1)	3–1	Luch-Energiya Vladivostok (2)	Rostov-on-Don
19:30	Gațcan 13'; Ananidze 27'; Dzyuba 90+5' (pen.)		Romanenko 39'	Stadium: Olimp – 2 Attendance: 14,500; Referee: Aleksandr Yegorov

== Final ==
8 May 2014
18:30

Krasnodar (1)	0–0 (a.e.t.)	Rostov (1)
	Report
Penalties
Granqvist (penalty scored); Abreu (penalty scored); Laborde (penalty scored); Joãozinho (penalty scored); Ari (penalty scored); Sigurðsson (penalty missed); Gazinskiy (penalty missed)	5–6	(penalty scored) Milić; (penalty scored) Poloz; (penalty scored) Dyakov; (penalty scored) Sinama Pongolle; (penalty scored) Dzyuba; (penalty missed) Gațcan; (penalty scored) Lolo

Anzhi-Arena, Kaspiysk
Attendance: 19,500
Referee: Sergei Karasev

== Top scorer ==
#	Scorer	Goals	Team
1	(Democratic Republic of the Congo) Jeremy Bokila	5	Terek Grozny
2	(Russia) Vasili Karmazinenko	4	SKA-Energiya Khabarovsk
2	(Russia) Artyom Sivayev	4	Zvezda Ryazan
4	(Russia) Denis Dorozhkin	3	Luch-Energiya Vladivostok
