= 2013–14 FC Krasnodar season =

FC Krasnodar
2013–14 season
- Chairman: Sergey Galitsky
- Manager: Slavoljub Muslin (until 9 August 2013); Aleh Konanaw (from 11 August 2013)
- Stadium: Kuban Stadium
- Russian Premier League: 5th
- Russian Cup: Runners-up
- Top goalscorer: League: Wánderson (9); All: Wánderson (12)
- Highest home attendance: 25,500 vs Kuban Krasnodar; 3 November 2013
- Lowest home attendance: 3,500 vs Zvezda Ryazan; 16 November 2013
- Average home league attendance: 11,521
Home colours	Away colours

The 2013–14 FC Krasnodar season was Krasnodars 3rd successive season in the Russian Premier League, the highest tier of football in Russia, in which they recorded their highest ever league finish, 5th, and qualified for the UEFA Europa League. Krasnodar also participated in the 2013–14 Russian Cup where they were runners-up to FC Rostov, losing on Penalties.

They started the season with Slavoljub Muslin in charge, however Muslin and the club agreed to mutually cancel their contract on 9 August 2013, with Aleh Konanaw being appointed as the new manager two days later.

== Squad ==
As of 27 March 2014

Note: Flags indicate national team as defined under FIFA eligibility rules; some limited exceptions apply. Players may hold more than one non-FIFA nationality.

No.	Pos.	Nation	Player
2	DF	UZB	Nikolay Markov
3	DF	SRB	Dušan Anđelković
4	DF	BLR	Alyaksandr Martynovich (C)
5	DF	POL	Artur Jędrzejczyk
6	DF	SWE	Andreas Granqvist
7	MF	RUS	Pavel Mamayev
8	MF	RUS	Yuri Gazinskiy
9	FW	BRA	Ari
14	FW	BRA	Wánderson
15	MF	RUS	Roman Shirokov
16	MF	RUS	Aleksei Pomerko
17	DF	RUS	Vitali Kaleshin
19	MF	BRA	Isael

No.	Pos.	Nation	Player
21	MF	COL	Ricardo Laborde
22	MF	BRA	Joãozinho
23	GK	RUS	Aleksandr Filtsov
25	MF	RUS	Yevgeni Shipitsin
26	MF	POR	Márcio Abreu
27	DF	ISL	Ragnar Sigurðsson
29	FW	CIV	Gerard Gohou
33	MF	URU	Mauricio Pereyra
55	DF	SRB	Nemanja Tubić
63	FW	RUS	Nikolay Komlichenko
88	GK	RUS	Andrey Sinitsyn
98	MF	RUS	Sergei Petrov

=== Out on loan ===
Note: Flags indicate national team as defined under FIFA eligibility rules; some limited exceptions apply. Players may hold more than one non-FIFA nationality.

No.	Pos.	Nation	Player
10	FW	ARM	Marcos Pizzelli (at Aktobe until 31 December 2014)
11	FW	SEN	Moussa Konaté (at Genoa until 30 June 2014)
20	MF	RUS	Igor Lambarschi (at Yenisey until 30 June 2014)
21	FW	RUS	Khyzyr Appaev (at Rotor)

No.	Pos.	Nation	Player
31	MF	MDA	Valeriu Ciupercă (at Yenisey)
68	MF	RUS	Nika Chkhapeliya (at Spartak Nalchik until 30 June 2014)
77	MF	HUN	Vladimir Koman (at Ural until 31 Dec 2013)
87	FW	RUS	Ruslan Bolov (at Spartak Nalchik until 30 June 2014)

=== Reserve squad ===
The following players are registered with the RFPL and are listed by club's website as reserve players. They are eligible to play for the first team.

Note: Flags indicate national team as defined under FIFA eligibility rules; some limited exceptions apply. Players may hold more than one non-FIFA nationality.

No.	Pos.	Nation	Player
35	MF	RUS	Oleg Samsonov
37	DF	RUS	Aleksandr Luzin
41	MF	RUS	Yevgeni Andriyenko
42	DF	RUS	Dmitri Novak
43	MF	RUS	Ruslan Shlyakhov
45	GK	RUS	Vsevolod Yermakov
46	DF	RUS	Andrei Gamalyan
47	FW	RUS	Ilya Zhigulyov
48	DF	RUS	Aleksandr Marchenko
49	FW	RUS	Dmitri Bakay
51	GK	RUS	Denis Kavlinov
52	DF	RUS	Ramil Zyabirov
53	MF	RUS	Pavel Marushko
54	MF	RUS	Aleksei Orlov
56	DF	RUS	Sergei Khmelevskoy
57	MF	RUS	Nikita Akimov
58	MF	RUS	Pavel Kryzhevskikh
59	DF	RUS	Kirill Morozov
61	GK	RUS	Dmitri Goryachkin

No.	Pos.	Nation	Player
62	FW	RUS	Valeri Alshanskiy
64	MF	RUS	Oleg Lanin
67	DF	RUS	Oleg Mikhaylov
71	DF	RUS	Dmitri Kuzmichyov
72	MF	RUS	Aleksei Mayer
73	GK	RUS	Stanislav Antipin
74	MF	RUS	Daniil Fomin
75	MF	RUS	Khasan Akhriyev
76	MF	RUS	Aleksandr Ageyev
78	MF	RUS	Stefan Balabanov
79	DF	RUS	Sergei Dychko
81	DF	RUS	Yevgeni Nesterenko
82	MF	RUS	Nikolai Ogurtsov
83	DF	RUS	Maksim Starkov
86	DF	RUS	Vasili Cherov
93	DF	RUS	Anton Maltsev
95	FW	RUS	Aleksandr Petruchenko
96	MF	RUS	Ilya Borisov
97	MF	RUS	Nurik Gadzhiyev

== Transfers ==
=== Summer ===
In: Note: Flags indicate national team as defined under FIFA eligibility rules; some limited exceptions apply. Players may hold more than one non-FIFA nationality.

No.	Pos.	Nation	Player
1	GK	RUS	Artyom Leonov (from (Russia) Akademiya Tolyatti)
5	DF	POL	Artur Jędrzejczyk (from (Poland) Legia Warsaw)
6	DF	SWE	Andreas Granqvist (from (Italy) Genoa)
7	MF	RUS	Pavel Mamayev (on loan from (Russia) CSKA Moscow)
8	MF	RUS	Yuri Gazinskiy (from (Russia) Torpedo Moscow)
9	FW	BRA	Ari (from (Russia) Spartak Moscow)
10	MF	ARM	Marcos Pizzelli (from (Russia) Kuban Krasnodar)
17	DF	RUS	Vitali Kaleshin (from (Russia) Rubin Kazan)
21	MF	COL	Ricardo Laborde (from (Cyprus) Anorthosis Famagusta)
23	GK	RUS	Aleksandr Filtsov (from (Russia) Lokomotiv Moscow)
29	FW	CIV	Gerard Gohou (from (Turkey) Kayseri Erciyesspor)
87	FW	RUS	Ruslan Bolov (from (Russia) Spartak Nalchik)

Out: Note: Flags indicate national team as defined under FIFA eligibility rules; some limited exceptions apply. Players may hold more than one non-FIFA nationality.

No.	Pos.	Nation	Player
1	GK	GEO	Nukri Revishvili (to (Georgia (country)) FC Dila Gori)
7	MF	RUS	Vladislav Ignatyev (to (Russia) Kuban Krasnodar)
11	FW	SEN	Moussa Konaté (on loan to (Italy) Genoa)
16	GK	RUS	Yevgeni Gorodov (to (Russia) Terek Grozny)
18	MF	MNE	Nikola Drinčić (to (Serbia) FK Partizan)
20	MF	RUS	Igor Lambarschi (on loan to (Russia) Yenisey Krasnoyarsk)
28	DF	RUS	Igor Smolnikov (to (Russia) Zenit St. Petersburg)
36	DF	CMR	Adolphe Teikeu (end of loan from (Ukraine) Metalurh Zaporizhzhia)
40	MF	RUS	Igor Yermakov (to (Russia) Energiya Volzhsky)
45	MF	RUS	Marat Garipov (to (Russia) Olimpia Volgograd)
77	MF	HUN	Vladimir Koman (on loan to (Russia) Ural Sverdlovsk Oblast)
—	MF	MDA	Valeriu Ciupercă (on loan to (Russia) Krasnodar-2, previously on loan to (Moldova) Academia Chișinău)
—	MF	RUS	Aleksandr Yerokhin (to (Russia) FC SKA-Energiya Khabarovsk, previously on loan)

=== Winter ===
In: Note: Flags indicate national team as defined under FIFA eligibility rules; some limited exceptions apply. Players may hold more than one non-FIFA nationality.

No.	Pos.	Nation	Player
15	MF	RUS	Roman Shirokov (on loan from (Russia) Zenit St. Petersburg)
16	MF	RUS	Aleksei Pomerko (from (Russia) Shinnik)
27	DF	ISL	Ragnar Sigurðsson (from (Denmark) F.C. Copenhagen)

Out: Note: Flags indicate national team as defined under FIFA eligibility rules; some limited exceptions apply. Players may hold more than one non-FIFA nationality.

No.	Pos.	Nation	Player
10	FW	ARM	Marcos Pizzelli (on loan to (Kazakhstan) Aktobe)
15	DF	RUS	Ruslan Nakhushev (to (Russia) Mordovia Saransk)
31	MF	MDA	Valeriu Ciupercă (on loan to (Moldova) Academia Chișinău)

== Friendlies ==
19 January 2013	Shakhtar Donetsk (Ukraine)	2–1	(Russia) Krasnodar	Going am Wilden Kaiser, Austria
19:30 MSK (UTC+4)	1:0 Douglas Costa 10'; 2:1 Luiz Adriano 30'	Summary	1:1 Pereyra 30'	Attendance: 200

22 January 2013	Krasnodar (Russia)	0–0	(Azerbaijan) Inter Baku	Walchsee, Austria
16:00 MSK (UTC+4)		Summary		Attendance: 100

27 January 2013	Krasnodar (Russia)	3–5	(Czech Republic) Slavia Prague	Bischofshofen, Austria
19:00 MSK (UTC+4)	1:0 Wánderson 6'; 2:4 Joãozinho 68' (pen.); 3:5 Wánderson 86'	Summary	1:1 Škutka 23'; 1:2 Nitrianský 51'; 1:3 Kolařík 62'; 1:4 Juhar 64'; 2:5 Bazal 75'	Attendance: 150

30 January 2013	Krasnodar (Russia)	1–0	(Georgia (country)) Dinamo Tbilisi	Uttendorf, Austria
18:00 MSK (UTC+4)	1:0 Konaté 4'	Summary		Attendance: 100

3 July 2013	Krasnodar (Russia)	1–0	(Israel) Maccabi Tel Aviv	Bischofshofen, Austria
19:30 MSK (UTC+4)	1:0 Petrov 24'	Summary		Attendance: 150

6 July 2013	Krasnodar (Russia)	2–2	(Czech Republic) Viktoria Plzeň	Uttendorf, Austria
19:30 MSK (UTC+4)	1:1 Koman 41'; 2:2 Isael 87'	Summary	0:1 Hora 40'; 1:2 Horváth 56'	Attendance: 100

10 July 2013	Krasnodar (Russia)	3–1	(Czech Republic) Vysočina Jihlava	Straßwalchen, Austria
17:00 MSK (UTC+4)	1:1 Wánderson 16'; 2:1 Pizzelli 23'; 3:1 Wánderson 43'	Summary	0:1 Přeučil 15'	Attendance: 100

7 September 2013	Krasnodar	3–4	Amkar Perm	Krasnodar
18:00 MSK (UTC+4)	1:0 Wánderson 9'; 2:2 Ari 65'; 3:4 Joãozinho 80' (pen.)	Summary	1:1 Nijholt 14'; 1:2 Picușceac 29'; 2:3 Rebko 66' (pen.); 2:4 Gol 78' (pen.)	Stadium: FC Krasnodar Academy Stadium; Attendance: 800

12 October 2013	Rostov	1–2	Krasnodar	Rostov-on-Don
15:00 MSK (UTC+4)	1:0 Dzyuba 22'	Summary	1:1 Shipitsin 44'; 1:2 Ari 83'	Stadium: Olimp-2; Attendance: 1,000

19 January 2014	Krasnodar (Russia)	3–0	(Kazakhstan) Kairat	Abu Dhabi, United Arab Emirates
19:00 MSK (UTC+4)	1:0 Markov 27'; 2:0 Pereyra 47'; 3:0 Mamayev 85'	Summary		Stadium: Zayed Sports City; Attendance: 100

25 January 2014	Shakhtar Donetsk (Ukraine)	0–2	(Russia) Krasnodar	Abu Dhabi, United Arab Emirates
16:00 MSK (UTC+4)		Summary	0:1 Shipitsin 34'; 0:2 Granqvist 40'	Stadium: Zayed Sports City Stadium; Attendance: 100

5 February 2014	Lech Poznań (Poland)	0–0	(Russia) Krasnodar	Arcos de la Frontera, Spain
19:00 MSK (UTC+4)		Summary		Stadium: Estadio Antonio Barbadillo; Attendance: 300

8 February 2014	Krasnodar (Russia)	1–1	(Czech Republic) Sparta Prague	Jerez de la Frontera, Spain
14:00 MSK (UTC+4)	1:1 Mamayev 62'	Summary	0:1 Lafata 5'	Stadium: Barceló Montecastillo; Attendance: 50

12 February 2014	Ludogorets (Bulgaria)	3–2	(Russia) Krasnodar	Chipiona, Spain
17:00 MSK (UTC+4)	1:2 Marcelinho 26'; 2:2 Zlatinski 38'; 3:2 Bezjak 79'	Summary	0:1 Wánderson 11'; 0:2 Joãozinho 12' (pen.)	Attendance: 200

18 February 2014	Krasnodar (Russia)	1–0	(Uzbekistan) Pakhtakor Tashkent	Belek, Turkey
19:30 MSK (UTC+4)	1:0 Wánderson 52'	Summary		Stadium: Cornelia Diamond; Attendance: 350

21 February 2014	Krasnodar	1–1	Rotor Volgograd	Belek, Turkey
13:00 MSK (UTC+4)	1:0 Ari 12'	Summary	1:1 Malygin 51'	Stadium: Cornelia Diamond; Attendance: 150

21 February 2014	Krasnodar (Russia)	2–1	(Ukraine) Metalurh Zaporizhzhia	Belek, Turkey
19:30 MSK (UTC+4)	Sigurðsson 56'; Ari 85'	Summary	Yusov 16'	Stadium: Cornelia Diamond; Attendance: 400

24 February 2014	Krasnodar (Russia)	5–0	(Kazakhstan) Irtysh Pavlodar	Belek, Turkey
13:00 MSK (UTC+4)	1:0 Wánderson 9'; 2:0 Joãozinho 45'; 3:0 Wánderson 72'; 4:0 Isael 82'; 5:0 Laborde 88'	Summary		Stadium: Cornelia Diamond; Attendance: 200

24 February 2014	Krasnodar (Russia)	2–2	(Kazakhstan) Aktobe	Belek, Turkey
19:30 MSK (UTC+4)	Isael (penalty missed) 56'; 1:1 Komlichenko 69'; 2:2 Wánderson 88'	Summary	0:1 Zyankovich 30'; 1:2 Tagibergen 78'	Stadium: Cornelia Diamond; Attendance: 300

27 February 2014	Krasnodar (Russia)	0–0	(Belarus) Dinamo Minsk	Belek, Turkey
19:30 MSK (UTC+4)		Summary		Stadium: Cornelia Diamond; Attendance: 200

13 March 2014	Krasnodar	3–1	MITOS Novocherkassk	Krasnodar
15:30 MSK (UTC+4)	1:1 Ari 9'; 2:1 Markov 28'; 3:1 Jędrzejczyk 66'	Summary	0:1 Agaptsev 5'	Stadium: FC Krasnodar Academy Stadium; Attendance: 500

== Competitions ==
=== Premier League ===
==== Matches ====
17 July 2013 1	Krasnodar	1–2	Zenit St. Petersburg	Krasnodar
20:00 MSK (UTC+4)	Pereyra 46'	Summary	Fayzulin 23'; Danny 37'	Stadium: Kuban Stadium; Attendance: 16,500; Referee: Timur Arslanbekov

21 July 2013 2	Rostov	2–2	Krasnodar	Rostov-on-Don
20:00 MSK (UTC+4)	Kalachev 17'; Dzyuba 49'	Summary	Abreu 15'; Wánderson 88'	Stadium: Olimp – 2 Attendance: 10,500; Referee: Evgeny Turbin

29 July 2013 3	Krasnodar	2–1	Amkar Perm	Krasnodar
20:00 MSK (UTC+4)	Joãozinho 47' (pen.); Abreu 49'	Summary	Jakubko 29'	Stadium: Kuban Stadium; Attendance: 9,700; Referee: Mikhail Vilkov

5 August 2013 4	Lokomotiv Moscow	3–1	Krasnodar	Moscow
21:15 MSK (UTC+3)	Denisov 41'; N'Doye 83'; Ďurica 88'	Report	Jędrzejczyk (red card) 44'; Joãozinho 59' (pen.)	Stadium: Lokomotiv Stadium; Attendance: 8,463; Referee: Sergey Karasev

18 August 2013 5	Krasnodar	1–1	Dynamo Moscow	Krasnodar
20:15 MSK (UTC+4)	Wánderson 9'	Summary	Panyukov 83'	Stadium: Kuban Stadium; Attendance: 10,500; Referee: Vladimir Kazmenko

24 August 2013 6	Anzhi Makhachkala	1–2	Krasnodar	Kaspiysk
21:00 MSK (UTC+4)	Ahmedov 45+2'	Summary	Pereyra 49'; Wánderson 74'	Stadium: Anzhi-Arena; Attendance: 17,800; Referee: Sergey Lapochkin

31 August 2013 7	Krasnodar	3–0	Volga Nizhny Novgorod	Krasnodar
21:00 MSK (UTC+4)	Wánderson 11', 32'; Joãozinho 44'	Summary	Kowalczyk (yellow card) 30' (yellow-red card) 87'	Stadium: Kuban Stadium; Attendance: 9,500; Referee: Sergey Kuznetsov

14 September 2013 8	Krasnodar	1–1	Krylia Sovetov	Krasnodar
18:00 MSK (UTC+4)	Kaleshin 9'	Summary	Tsallagov 89'	Stadium: Kuban Stadium; Attendance: 8,750; Referee: Igor Fedotov

21 September 2013 9	Terek Grozny	0–1	Krasnodar	Grozny
19:30 MSK (UTC+4)		Summary	Mamayev 14'	Stadium: Terek Stadium; Attendance: 17,735; Referee: Aleksey Eskov

25 September 2013 10	Spartak Moscow	3–2	Krasnodar	Moscow
18:15 MSK (UTC+4)	Jurado 4', 30'; Movsisyan 27'	Summary	Pereyra 16'; Isael 68'	Stadium: Lokomotiv Stadium; Attendance: 12,500; Referee: Sergey Kuznetsov

29 September 2013 11	Krasnodar	1–0	Rubin Kazan	Kuban Stadium
18:00 MSK (UTC+4)	Pereyra 3'; Granqvist (red card) 29'	Summary		Stadium: Krasnodar; Attendance: 5,200; Referee: Vladislav Bezborodov

5 October 2013 12	Ural	0–2	Krasnodar	Yekaterinburg
13:30 MSK (UTC+4)		Summary	Joãozinho 50'; Pereyra 63'	Stadium: Central Stadium; Attendance: 8,000; Referee: Maxim Layushkin

19 October 2013 13	Krasnodar	4–0	Tom Tomsk	Kuban Stadium
16:00 MSK (UTC+4)	Mamayev 4'; Gazinskiy 55'; Joãozinho 71'; Ari 73'	Summary		Stadium: Krasnodar; Attendance: 16,700; Referee: Vasiliy Kazartsev

27 October 2013 14	CSKA Moscow	5–1	Krasnodar	Moscow
16:00 MSK (UTC+4)	Tošić 14', 27', 39'; Doumbia 18'; Ignashevich 67'	Summary	Mamayev 49'	Stadium: Eduard Streltsov Stadium; Attendance: 8,500; Referee: Mikhail Vilkov

3 November 2013 15	Krasnodar	1–2	Kuban Krasnodar	Kuban Stadium
13:30 MSK (UTC+4)	Gohou 90+3'	Summary	Bucur 64'; Popov 90+1'	Stadium: Krasnodar; Attendance: 25,500; Referee: Vladislav Bezborodov

10 November 2013 16	Rubin Kazan	0–1	Krasnodar	Kazan
18:00 MSK (UTC+4)		Summary	Wánderson 75'	Stadium: Central Stadium; Attendance: 4,091; Referee: Igor Fedotov

25 November 2013 17	Krasnodar	3–2	Terek Grozny	Kuban Stadium
19:00 MSK (UTC+4)	Komorowski 36' (o.g.); Mamayev 66'; Wánderson 74'	Summary	Ivanov 38', 67'	Stadium: Krasnodar; Attendance: 4,100; Referee: Timur Arslanbekov

1 December 2013 18	Krylia Sovetov	1–0	Krasnodar	Samara
16:00 MSK (UTC+4)	Drahun 69'	Summary		Stadium: Metallurg Stadium; Attendance: 10,797; Referee: Vladimir Kazmenko

6 December 2013 19	Krasnodar	1–0	CSKA Moscow	Krasnodar
17:45 MSK (UTC+4)	Jędrzejczyk 63'	Summary		Stadium: Kuban Stadium; Attendance: 11,300; Referee: Vitali Meshkov

8 March 2013 20	Krasnodar	0–1	Ural	Yekaterinburg
16:30 MSK (UTC+4)		Summary	Acevedo 19'	Stadium: Central Stadium; Attendance: 8,300; Referee: Sergey Lapochkin

17 March 2013 21	Tom Tomsk	1–1	Krasnodar	Tomsk
16:30 MSK (UTC+4)	Panchenko 60'	Summary	Wánderson 88'	Stadium: Trud Stadium; Attendance: 1,950; Referee: Timur Arslanbekov

22 March 2013 22	Krasnodar	4–0	Spartak Moscow	Krasnodar
19:00 MSK (UTC+4)	Ari 4', 9', 50'; Wánderson 31'	Summary		Stadium: Kuban Stadium; Attendance: 23,400; Referee: Vladislav Bezborodov

30 March 2013 23	Kuban Krasnodar	1–3	Krasnodar	Krasnodar
20:15 MSK (UTC+4)	Melgarejo 14'	Summary	Shirokov 41', 79'; Ari 51'	Stadium: Kuban Stadium; Attendance: 15,742; Referee: Vyacheslav Kharlamov

6 April 2014 24	Krasnodar	0–2	Rostov	Krasnodar
18:30 MSK (UTC+4)		Summary	Ananidze 45+1'; Dzyuba 90+4' (pen.)	Stadium: Kuban Stadium; Attendance: 10,600; Referee: Alexey Nikolaev

12 April 2013 25	Zenit St. Petersburg	4–1	Krasnodar	Saint Petersburg
19:30 MSK (UTC+4)	Hulk 21', 64', 90+3'; Rondón 81'	[ Summary]	Joãozinho 52'	Stadium: Petrovsky Stadium; Attendance: 19,375; Referee: Aleksey Eskov

20 April 2014 26	Dynamo Moscow	1–2	Krasnodar	Moscow
16:00 MSK (UTC+4)	Kokorin 27'; Kozlov (red card) 48'	Summary	Shirokov 73'; Laborde 80'; Laborde (red card) 89'	Stadium: Arena Khimki; Attendance: 7,875; Referee: Vladislav Bezborodov

26 April 2014 27	Krasnodar	1–3	Lokomotiv Moscow	Krasnodar
19:00 MSK (UTC+3)	Joãozinho 45'	Summary	Al.Miranchuk 6'; Samedov 90+2', 90+5'	Stadium: Kuban Stadium; Attendance: 13,600; Referee: Sergei Ivanov

2 May 2013 28	Volga Nizhny Novgorod	0–1	Krasnodar	Nizhny Novgorod
16:30 MSK (UTC+4)	Sarkisov (yellow card) 63' (yellow-red card) 85'	Summary	Ari 15'	Stadium: Lokomotiv Stadium; Attendance: 2,500; Referee: Timur Arslanbekov

11 May 2014 29	Krasnodar	1–0	Anzhi Makhachkala	Krasnodar
18:00 MSK (UTC+4)	Granqvist 6'	Summary		Stadium: Kuban Stadium; Attendance: 9,300; Referee: Vladislav Bezborodov

15 May 2013 30	Amkar Perm	2–2	Krasnodar	Perm
18:30 MSK (UTC+4)	Vassiljev 20'; Picusceac 64'	Summary	Pereyra 25'; Petrov 55'	Stadium: Zvezda Stadium; Attendance: 8,100; Referee: Aleksandr Egorov

==== League table ====
Pos	Team	Pld	W	D	L	GF	GA	GD	Pts	Qualification or relegation
3	Lokomotiv Moscow	30	17	8	5	51	23	+28	59	Qualification for the Europa League play-off round
4	Dynamo Moscow	30	15	7	8	54	37	+17	52	Qualification for the Europa League third qualifying round
5	Krasnodar	30	15	5	10	46	39	+7	50 (Note: Krasnodar ahead of Spartak Moscow on head-to-head points; Krasnodar–Spartak Moscow 4–0, Spartak Moscow–Krasnodar 3–2.)	Qualification for the Europa League second qualifying round
6	Spartak Moscow	30	15	5	10	46	36	+10	50	
7	Rostov	30	10	9	11	40	40	0	39	Qualification for the Europa League play-off round (Note: Rostov won the 2013–14 Russian Cup, therefore qualifying for the play-off round of the 2014–15 UEFA Europa League. However, it did not pass the Russian Football Union European licensing and thus its spot was given to Spartak. However, that RFU decision was then overturned by the CAS and Rostov was returned to the Europa League.)

Source: Russian Premier League
Rules for classification: 1) points; 2) number of wins; 3) head-to-head points; 4) number of head-to-head wins; 5) head-to-head goal difference; 6) number of head-to-head goals scored; 7) number of head-to-head away goals scored; 8) goal difference; 9) number of goals scored; 10) number of away goals scored; 11) position in the 2012–13 season (only used until all the regularly scheduled games have been played); 11) extra play-off game or tournament between the teams in question.

=== Russian Cup ===
30 October 2013 Round of 32	Dolgoprudny	1–4	Krasnodar	Dolgoprudny
18:30 MSK (UTC+4)	Zvyagin 34'	Summary	Isael 13'; Marchenko 17'; Gohou 56'; Pizzelli 90+1'	Stadium: Salyut Stadium; Attendance: 2,700; Referee: Vladimir Moskalyov

16 November 2013 Round of 16	Krasnodar	3–2	Zvezda Ryazan	Krasnodar
14:30 MSK (UTC+4)	Laborde 27', 34'; Wánderson 62'	Summary	Mirzov 20'; Artyom Sivayev 44'	Stadium: Kuban Stadium; Attendance: 3,500; Referee: Igor Nizovtsev

26 March 2014 Quarter-Finals	Krasnodar	3–0	Tosno	Krasnodar
18:00 MSK (UTC+4)	Ari 11'; Mamayev 16'; Wánderson 62'	Summary		Stadium: Kuban Stadium; Attendance: 9,400; Referee: Igor Fedotov

6 April 2014 Semi-Finals	CSKA Moscow	0–1	Krasnodar	Moscow
19:30 MSK (UTC+4)		Summary	Wánderson 28'	Stadium: Arena Khimki; Attendance: 6,000; Referee: Mikhail Vilkov

8 May 2014 Final	Krasnodar	0–0 (5–6 p)	Rostov	Kaspiysk
18:30 MSK (UTC+4)	Pereyra (red card) 71'	Summary	Bastos (yellow card) 23' (yellow-red card) 100'	Stadium: Anzhi-Arena; Attendance: 19,500; Referee: Sergei Karasev
	Penalties
	Granqvist (penalty scored); Abreu (penalty scored); Laborde (penalty scored); Joãozinho (penalty scored); Ari (penalty scored); Sigurðsson (penalty missed); Gazinskiy (penalty missed)		(penalty scored) Milić; (penalty scored) Poloz; (penalty scored) Dyakov; (penalty scored) Sinama Pongolle; (penalty scored) Dzyuba; (penalty missed) Gațcan; (penalty scored) Lolo

== Squad statistics ==
As of Match played 15 May 2014

=== Appearances and goals ===
No.	Pos	Nat	Player	Total		Premier League		Russian Cup	
No.	Pos	Nat	Player	Apps	Goals	Apps	Goals	Apps	Goals
2	DF	(Uzbekistan) UZB	Nikolay Markov	12	0	7+4	0	1+0	0
3	DF	(Serbia) SRB	Dušan Anđelković	6	0	5+0	0	1+0	0
4	DF	(Belarus) BLR	Alyaksandr Martynovich	27	0	24+0	0	2+1	0
5	DF	(Poland) POL	Artur Jędrzejczyk	30	1	27+0	1	3+0	0
6	DF	(Sweden) SWE	Andreas Granqvist	23	1	20+0	1	3+0	0
7	MF	(Russia) RUS	Pavel Mamayev	24	5	19+2	4	2+1	1
8	MF	(Russia) RUS	Yuri Gazinskiy	33	1	25+4	1	4+0	0
9	FW	(Brazil) BRA	Ari	21	7	14+4	6	3+0	1
14	FW	(Brazil) BRA	Wánderson	33	12	27+2	9	4+0	3
15	MF	(Russia) RUS	Roman Shirokov	8	3	5+1	3	2+0	0
16	MF	(Russia) RUS	Aleksei Pomerko	5	0	0+5	0	0+0	0
17	DF	(Russia) RUS	Vitali Kaleshin	23	1	21+0	1	2+0	0
19	MF	(Brazil) BRA	Isael	15	2	2+11	1	1+1	1
21	MF	(Colombia) COL	Ricardo Laborde	12	3	2+6	1	2+2	2
22	MF	(Brazil) BRA	Joãozinho	34	7	29+1	7	4+0	0
23	GK	(Russia) RUS	Aleksandr Filtsov	20	0	20+0	0	0+0	0
25	MF	(Russia) RUS	Yevgeni Shipitsin	23	0	9+11	0	2+1	0
26	MF	(Portugal) POR	Márcio Abreu	27	2	16+8	2	0+3	0
27	DF	(Iceland) ISL	Ragnar Sigurðsson	9	0	6+0	0	2+1	0
29	FW	(Ivory Coast) CIV	Gerard Gohou	7	2	1+5	1	1+0	1
33	MF	(Uruguay) URU	Mauricio Pereyra	27	6	22+2	6	2+1	0
48	DF	(Russia) RUS	Aleksandr Marchenko	1	0	0+0	0	1+0	0
55	DF	(Serbia) SRB	Nemanja Tubić	10	0	5+4	0	1+0	0
63	FW	(Russia) RUS	Nikolay Komlichenko	5	0	0+4	0	0+1	0
64	MF	(Russia) RUS	Oleg Lanin	1	0	0+0	0	1+0	0
88	GK	(Russia) RUS	Andrey Sinitsyn	15	0	10+0	0	5+0	0
98	MF	(Russia) RUS	Sergei Petrov	17	1	7+7	1	2+1	0
Players who left Krasnodar on loan during the season:
10	FW	(Armenia) ARM	Marcos Pizzelli	8	2	3+3	0	2+0	2
87	FW	(Russia) RUS	Ruslan Bolov	1	0	0+0	0	1+0	0
Players who appeared for Krasnodar who left during the season:
15	DF	(Russia) RUS	Ruslan Nakhushev	4	0	2+0	0	2+0	0
18	MF	(Montenegro) MNE	Nikola Drinčić	1	0	0+1	0	0+0	0
28	DF	(Russia) RUS	Igor Smolnikov	4	0	4+0	0	0+0	0

=== Top scorers ===
Place	Position	Nation	Number	Name	Russian Premier League	Russian Cup	Total
1	FW	(Brazil)	14	Wánderson	9	3	12
2	MF	(Brazil)	22	Joãozinho	7	0	7
2	FW	(Brazil)	9	Ari	6	1	7
4	MF	(Uruguay)	33	Mauricio Pereyra	6	0	6
5	MF	(Russia)	7	Pavel Mamayev	4	1	5
6	MF	(Russia)	15	Roman Shirokov	3	0	3
6	MF	(Colombia)	21	Ricardo Laborde	1	2	3
8	MF	(Portugal)	26	Márcio Abreu	2	0	2
8	MF	(Brazil)	19	Isael	1	1	2
8	FW	(Ivory Coast)	29	Gerard Gohou	1	1	2
8	FW	(Armenia)	10	Marcos Pizzelli	0	2	2
12	DF	(Russia)	17	Vitali Kaleshin	1	0	1
12	MF	(Russia)	8	Yuri Gazinskiy	1	0	1
12	DF	(Poland)	5	Artur Jędrzejczyk	1	0	1
12	DF	(Sweden)	6	Andreas Granqvist	1	0	1
12	MF	(Russia)	98	Sergei Petrov	1	0	1
12	DF	(Russia)	48	Aleksandr Marchenko	0	1	1
12				Own goal	1	0	1
				TOTALS	46	11	57

=== Disciplinary record ===
Number	Nation	Position	Name	Russian Premier League		Russian Cup		Total	
Number	Nation	Position	Name	Yellow card	Red card	Yellow card	Red card	Yellow card	Red card
2	(Uzbekistan)	DF	Nikolay Markov	4	0	0	0	4	0
4	(Belarus)	DF	Alyaksandr Martynovich	5	0	0	0	5	0
5	(Poland)	DF	Artur Jędrzejczyk	4	1	0	0	4	1
6	(Sweden)	DF	Andreas Granqvist	5	1	1	0	6	1
7	(Russia)	MF	Pavel Mamayev	1	0	1	0	2	0
8	(Russia)	MF	Yuri Gazinskiy	6	0	1	0	7	0
9	(Brazil)	FW	Ari	2	0	1	0	3	0
14	(Brazil)	FW	Wánderson	5	0	0	0	5	0
15	(Russia)	MF	Roman Shirokov	2	0	0	0	2	0
17	(Russia)	DF	Vitali Kaleshin	4	0	0	0	4	0
19	(Brazil)	MF	Isael	1	0	0	0	1	0
21	(Colombia)	MF	Ricardo Laborde	2	1	0	0	2	1
22	(Brazil)	MF	Joãozinho	3	0	1	0	4	0
25	(Russia)	MF	Yevgeni Shipitsin	1	0	1	0	2	0
26	(Portugal)	MF	Márcio Abreu	4	0	0	0	4	0
27	(Iceland)	DF	Ragnar Sigurðsson	3	0	1	0	4	0
28	(Russia)	DF	Igor Smolnikov	1	0	0	0	1	0
33	(Uruguay)	MF	Mauricio Pereyra	5	0	0	1	5	1
88	(Russia)	GK	Andrey Sinitsyn	1	0	1	0	2	0
98	(Russia)	MF	Sergei Petrov	1	0	0	0	1	0
			TOTALS	60	3	8	1	68	4
