= Denis Kniga =

Russian footballer

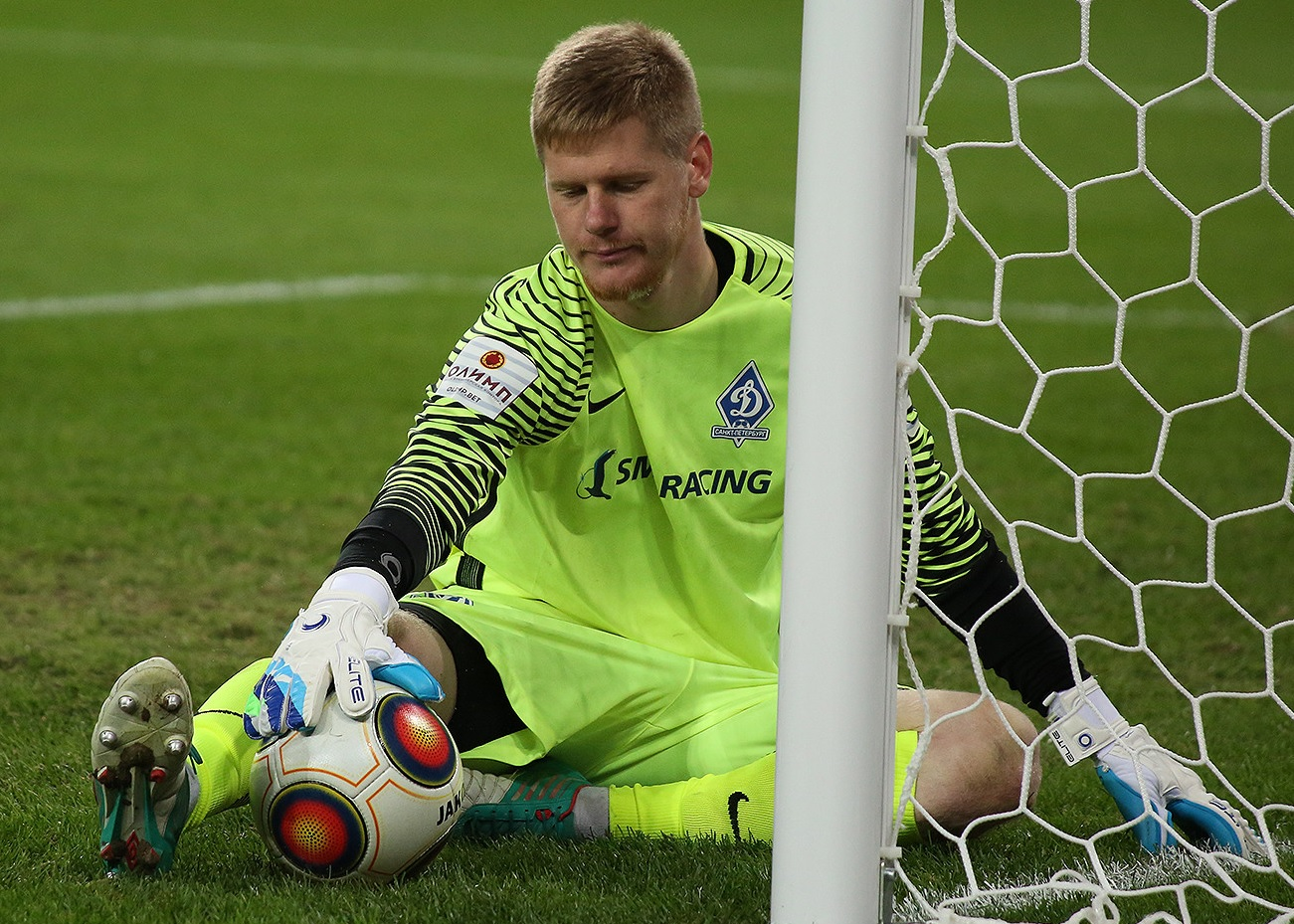
- Kniga with Dynamo St. Petersburg in 2017

Personal information
- Full name: Denis Mikhaylovich Kniga
- Date of birth: 14 April 1992 (age 34)
- Place of birth: Chernigovka, Russia
- Height: 1.86 m (6 ft 1 in)
- Position: Goalkeeper

Senior career*
Years	Team	Apps	(Gls)
2011–2014	Luch-Energiya	20	(0)
2013	→ Dynamo Bryansk (loan)	15	(0)
2014	→ Rotor Volgograd (loan)	1	(0)
2015	Dynamo St. Petersburg	10	(0)
2015–2017	Tosno	12	(0)
2016	→ Riga (loan)	3	(0)
2017	→ Neftekhimik Nizhnekamsk (loan)	10	(0)
2017–2018	Dynamo St. Petersburg	3	(0)
2018	→ Khimki (loan)	0	(0)
2018	Kolkheti-1913 Poti	13	(0)
2019–2020	Deren		
2020	Dynamo Stavropol	12	(0)
2021	Yadro St. Petersburg (amateur)		
- * Club domestic league appearances and goals

Denis Mikhaylovich Kniga (Russian: Денис Михайлович Книга; born 14 April 1992) is a Russian former professional football player.

== Career ==
He made his Russian Football National League debut for Luch-Energiya Vladivostok on 27 May 2012 in a game against FC Fakel Voronezh.

In April 2019, Kniga moved to Mongolia and joined Deren in the Mongolian National Premier League.
