= Aleksandr Filtsov =

Russian professional football goalkeeper

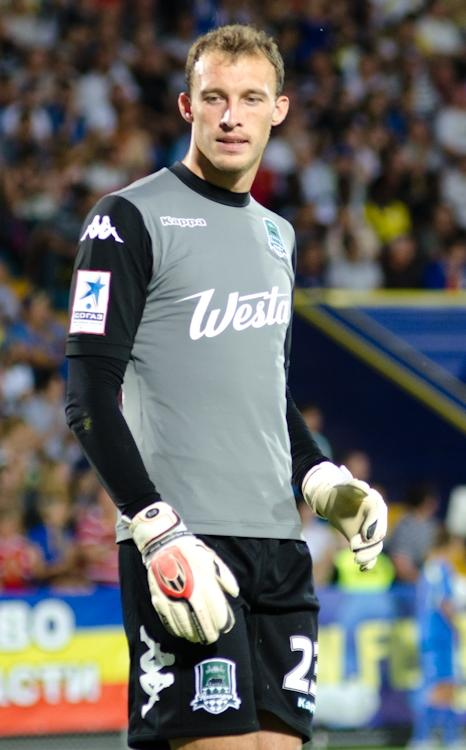
- Filtsov with FC Krasnodar in 2013

Personal information
- Full name: Aleksandr Yevgenyevich Filtsov
- Date of birth: 2 January 1990 (age 36)
- Place of birth: Shimanovsk, Amur Oblast, Russian SFSR
- Height: 1.97 m (6 ft 5 1/2 in)
- Position: Goalkeeper

Youth career
- Konoplyov football academy

Senior career*
Years	Team	Apps	(Gls)
2007	Krylia Sovetov-SOK Dimitrovgrad	4	(0)
2008–2009	Togliatti	31	(0)
2010–2013	Lokomotiv Moscow	6	(0)
2013	→ Krasnodar (loan)	8	(0)
2013–2014	Krasnodar	23	(0)
2014–2018	Rubin Kazan	0	(0)
2014–2015	→ Rubin-2 Kazan (loan)	2	(0)
2016	→ Arsenal Tula (loan)	15	(0)
2017	→ Anzhi Makhachkala (loan)	0	(0)
2018–2019	Rotor Volgograd	10	(0)
2019–2020	Shakhtyor Soligorsk	1	(0)
2020	→ Smolevichi (loan)	6	(0)

International career
2009	Russia U19	4	(0)
2011–2013	Russia U21	7	(0)
- * Club domestic league appearances and goals

Aleksandr Yevgenyevich Filtsov (Russian: Александр Евгеньевич Фильцов; born 2 January 1990) is a Russian former professional football goalkeeper.

== Club career ==
He made his debut in the Russian Premier League on 18 June 2011 for FC Lokomotiv Moscow in a game against FC Spartak Moscow when Lokomotiv's first-choice goalkeeper Guilherme was sent off.

FC Krasnodar bought out his contract from FC Lokomotiv Moscow after he played 8 games for Krasnodar on loan.

On 20 June 2014, Filtsov joined Rubin Kazan.

On 31 August 2019, he signed with Belarusian club Shakhtyor Soligorsk.

=== Career statistics ===
As of 9 December 2017

Club	Season	League			Cup		Continental		Total	
Club	Season	Division	Apps	Goals	Apps	Goals	Apps	Goals	Apps	Goals
FC Krylia Sovetov-SOK	2007	PFL	4	0	0	0	–		4	0
FC Togliatti	2008	PFL	10	0	2	0	–		12	0
FC Togliatti	2009	PFL	21	0	0	0	–		21	0
FC Togliatti	Total		31	0	2	0	0	0	33	0
FC Lokomotiv Moscow	2010	Russian Premier League	0	0	0	0	0	0	0	0
FC Lokomotiv Moscow	2011–12	Russian Premier League	6	0	1	0	0	0	7	0
FC Lokomotiv Moscow	2012–13	Russian Premier League	0	0	0	0	–		0	0
FC Lokomotiv Moscow	Total		6	0	1	0	0	0	7	0
FC Krasnodar	2012–13	Russian Premier League	11	0	0	0	–		11	0
FC Krasnodar	2013–14	Russian Premier League	20	0	0	0	–		20	0
FC Krasnodar	Total		31	0	0	0	0	0	31	0
FC Rubin Kazan	2014–15	Russian Premier League	0	0	0	0	–		0	0
FC Rubin Kazan	2015–16	Russian Premier League	0	0	0	0	0	0	0	0
FC Rubin-2 Kazan	2014–15	PFL	2	0	–		–		2	0
FC Arsenal Tula	2015–16	FNL	12	0	–		–		12	0
FC Arsenal Tula	2016–17	Russian Premier League	3	0	0	0	–		3	0
FC Arsenal Tula	Total		15	0	0	0	0	0	15	0
FC Anzhi Makhachkala	2016–17	Russian Premier League	0	0	0	0	–		0	0
FC Rubin Kazan	2017–18	Russian Premier League	0	0	0	0	–		0	0
FC Rubin Kazan	Total (2 spells)		0	0	0	0	0	0	0	0
Career total			89	0	3	0	0	0	92	0
