= Artur Rylov =

Russian footballer

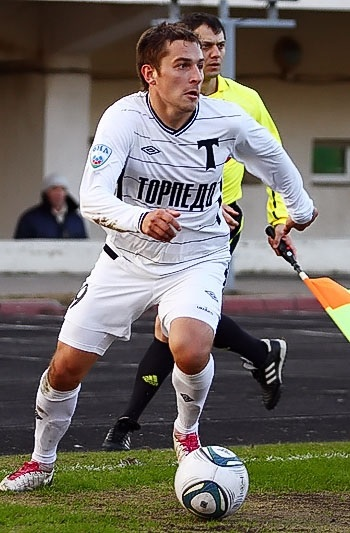

Personal information
- Full name: Artur Igorevich Rylov
- Date of birth: 12 April 1989 (age 37)
- Place of birth: Vologda, Russian SFSR
- Height: 1.75 m (5 ft 9 in)
- Position: Midfielder

Youth career
- FC Saturn Moscow Oblast

Senior career*
Years	Team	Apps	(Gls)
2007–2009	FC Moscow	4	(0)
2010	FC Krylia Sovetov Samara	2	(0)
2010	→ PFC Spartak Nalchik (loan)	7	(0)
2011–2012	FC Torpedo Moscow	48	(5)
2012–2014	FC Rotor Volgograd	64	(5)
2014–2015	FC Shinnik Yaroslavl	30	(3)
2015–2016	FC Fakel Voronezh	43	(8)
2017	FC SKA-Khabarovsk	7	(0)
2017–2018	FC Rotor Volgograd	4	(0)

International career
2009	Russia U-20	6	(1)
- * Club domestic league appearances and goals

Artur Igorevich Rylov (Russian: Артур Игоревич Рылов; born 12 April 1989) is a Russian former footballer.
