= Aleksandr Manukovsky =

Russian footballer

Personal information
- Full name: Aleksandr Aleksandrovich Manukovsky
- Date of birth: 11 July 1985 (age 41)
- Place of birth: Voronezh, Russian SFSR
- Height: 1.78 m (5 ft 10 in)
- Position: Midfielder

Senior career*
| Years | Team | Apps | (Gls) |
| 2005 | Dynamo Moscow | 0 | (0) |
| 2006–2009 | Dynamo Voronezh | 54 | (3) |
| 2010–2014 | Khimik Dzerzhinsk | 105 | (7) |
| 2014–2017 | Yenisey Krasnoyarsk | 55 | (3) |
| 2016–2017 | → Sokol Saratov (loan) | 34 | (4) |
| 2017–2019 | Fakel Voronezh | 61 | (4) |
| 2019–2020 | Volgar Astrakhan | 19 | (1) |
| 2020–2021 | Akzhayik | 12 | (0) |
| 2021–2022 | Fakel-M Voronezh | 23 | (2) |
- * Club domestic league appearances and goals

Aleksandr Aleksandrovich Manukovsky (Russian: Александр Александрович Мануковский; born 11 July 1985) is a Russian former professional football player.

== Club career ==
He made his Russian Football National League debut for FC Khimik Dzerzhinsk on 13 July 2013 in a game against FC Baltika Kaliningrad.
