= Aleksandr Korotayev =

Russian footballer (born 1992)

Personal information
- Full name: Aleksandr Stanislavovich Korotayev
- Date of birth: 15 July 1992 (age 34)
- Place of birth: Izhevsk, Russia
- Height: 1.68 m (5 ft 6 in)
- Position: Forward

Team information
- Current team: FC KDV Tomsk
- Number: 24

Youth career
- Konoplyov football academy

Senior career*
Years	Team	Apps	(Gls)
2010–2012	FC Akademiya Togliatti	70	(41)
2013–2014	FC Rotor Volgograd	25	(1)
2014–2016	FC Sokol Saratov	65	(13)
2016–2017	FC Yenisey Krasnoyarsk	12	(0)
2017	→ FC Dynamo St. Petersburg (loan)	10	(2)
2017	FC Dynamo St. Petersburg	22	(3)
2018–2019	FC Rotor Volgograd	47	(3)
2019–2020	FC Chayka Peschanokopskoye	20	(3)
2020–2021	FC Tyumen	26	(11)
2021–2022	FC Olimp-Dolgoprudny	33	(5)
2022–2025	FC Tyumen	81	(11)
2025–	FC KDV Tomsk	41	(6)

International career^{‡}
2011	Russia U-19	1	(0)
2013	Russia U-21	1	(1)
- * Club domestic league appearances and goals as of 1 November 2026 ‡ National team caps and goals as of 11 January 2014

Aleksandr Stanislavovich Korotayev (Russian: Александр Станиславович Коротаев; born 15 July 1992) is a Russian professional football player who plays for FC KDV Tomsk.

== Club career ==
He made his Russian Football National League debut for FC Rotor Volgograd on 11 March 2013 in a game against FC Neftekhimik Nizhnekamsk.
