= Illya Hawrylaw =

Belarusian footballer

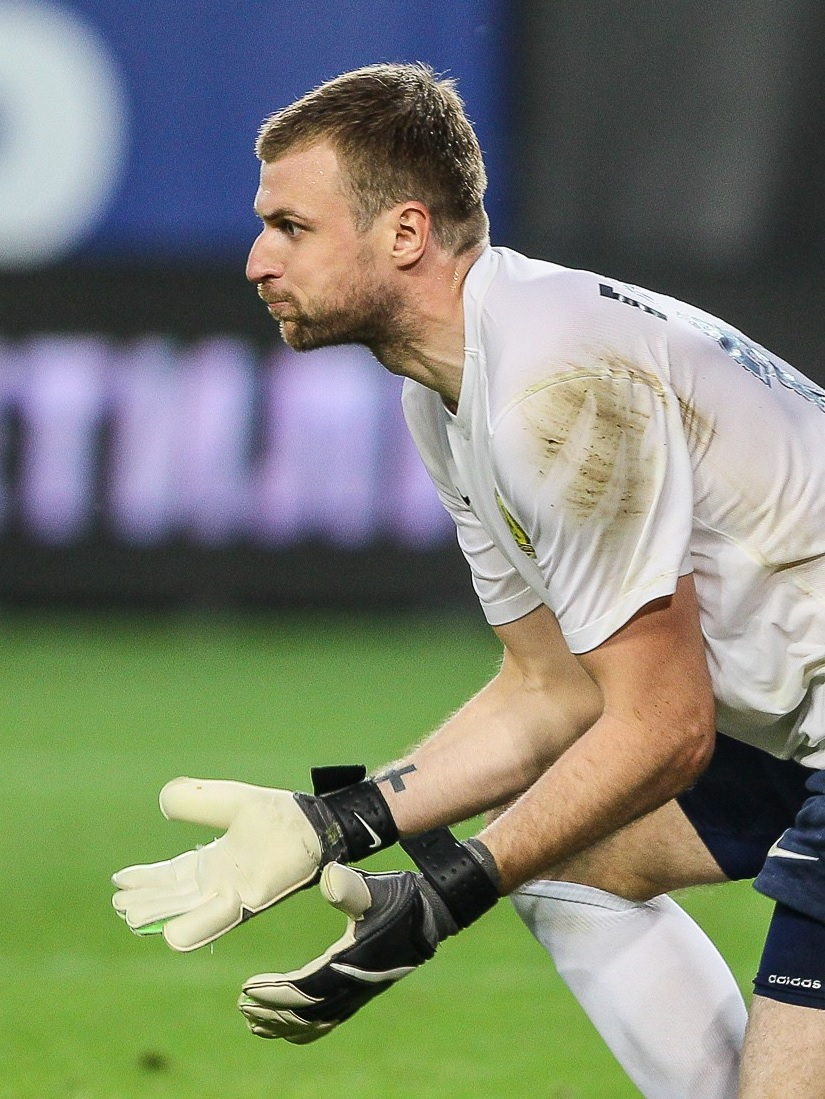
- Hawrylaw with Luch-Energiya in 2016

Personal information
- Full name: Illya Andreyevich Hawrylaw
- Date of birth: 26 September 1988 (age 38)
- Place of birth: Vitebsk, Byelorussian SSR, Soviet Union
- Height: 1.90 m (6 ft 3 in)
- Position: Goalkeeper

Senior career*
Years	Team	Apps	(Gls)
2005	Molodechno	19	(0)
2006	Dinamo Minsk	0	(0)
2007–2009	Moscow	0	(0)
2008	→ Dnepr Mogilev (loan)	1	(0)
2008	→ Torpedo Zhodino (loan)	13	(0)
2010	Volgar-Gazprom Astrakhan	2	(0)
2010	Torpedo Zhodino	3	(0)
2011–2012	Avangard Kursk	25	(0)
2012–2013	Khimki	20	(0)
2013	Rotor Volgograd	4	(0)
2014	Shakhtyor Soligorsk	3	(0)
2015	Granit Mikashevichi	26	(0)
2016–2017	Luch-Energiya Vladivostok	33	(0)
2017	Rotor Volgograd	4	(0)

International career
2009	Belarus U21	3	(0)
- * Club domestic league appearances and goals as of 13 August 2017

Illya Andreyevich Hawrylaw (Belarusian: Ілля Андрэевiч Гаўрылаў; Russian: Илья Андреевич Гаврилов; born 26 September 1988) is a Belarusian professional football player. He also holds Russian citizenship.

== Match fixing ==
On 20 February 2018, the BFF banned him from football for life for his involvement in the match-fixing.
