= Vladimir Romanenko =

Russian footballer

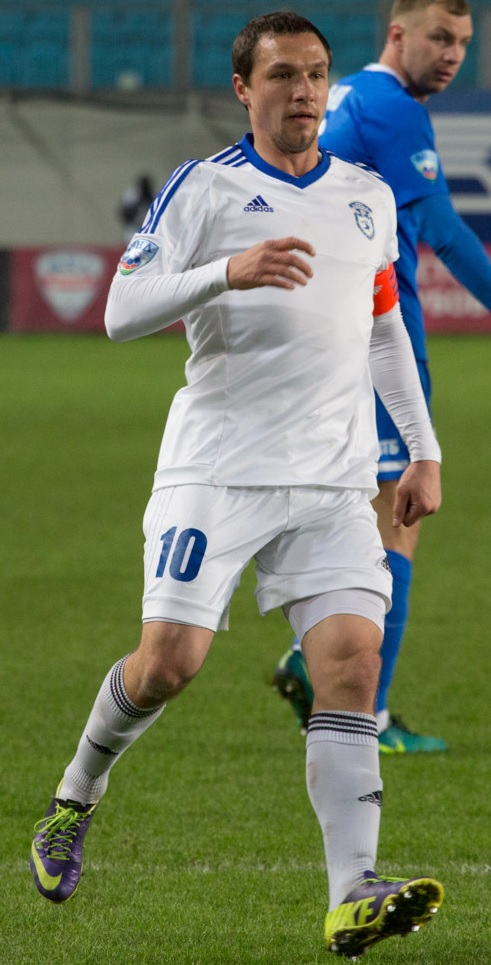
- Romanenko with Sokol Saratov in 2016

Personal information
- Full name: Vladimir Aleksandrovich Romanenko
- Date of birth: 30 September 1987 (age 39)
- Place of birth: Saratov, Russian SFSR
- Height: 1.73 m (5 ft 8 in)
- Positions: Midfielder; forward

Youth career
- FC Sokol Saratov

Senior career*
| Years | Team | Apps | (Gls) |
| 2005 | FC Sokol Saratov | 19 | (7) |
| 2006 | FC Salyut-Energiya Belgorod | 32 | (6) |
| 2007–2009 | FC KAMAZ Naberezhnye Chelny | 85 | (12) |
| 2010 | FC Sokol Saratov | 22 | (2) |
| 2011–2012 | FC Khimki | 46 | (1) |
| 2012–2013 | FC Volgar Astrakhan | 28 | (2) |
| 2013–2014 | FC Luch-Energiya Vladivostok | 31 | (2) |
| 2014–2015 | FC Tosno | 34 | (6) |
| 2015–2017 | FC Sokol Saratov | 74 | (5) |
| 2017–2018 | FC Rotor Volgograd | 38 | (3) |
| 2018–2019 | FC Armavir | 35 | (1) |
| 2019–2020 | FC Sokol Saratov | 17 | (5) |
| 2020–2022 | FC Tekstilshchik Ivanovo | 23 | (0) |
- * Club domestic league appearances and goals

Vladimir Aleksandrovich Romanenko (Russian: Владимир Александрович Романенко; born 30 September 1987) is a Russian former professional footballer.

== Club career ==
He played 13 seasons in the Russian Football National League for 10 different clubs.
