= Sergei Puchkov =

Russian footballer

Personal information
- Full name: Sergei Mikhaylovich Puchkov
- Date of birth: 12 January 1985 (age 41)
- Height: 2.02 m (6 ft 8 in)
- Position: Midfielder

Youth career
- FC Spartak Moscow
- FC Dynamo Kyiv

Senior career*
Years	Team	Apps	(Gls)
2001	FC Dynamo-Chapayevka Kyiv		
2001–2002	FC Borysfen-2 Boryspil	7	(1)
2002	FC Dynamo-3 Kyiv	4	(0)
2003–2004	FC Dynamo-2 Kyiv	29	(2)
2012	FC Oka Beloomut		
2012	FC Dolgoprudny-2		
2013–2019	FSC Dolgoprudny	133	(13)
2025–2026	FC Spartak Kostroma	2	(0)
- * Club domestic league appearances and goals

Sergei Mikhaylovich Puchkov (Russian: Серге́й Михайлович Пучков; born 12 January 1985) is a Russian former football midfielder. He also holds Ukrainian citizenship as Serhiy Mykhaylovych Puchkov (Ukrainian: Сергій Михайлович Пучков).

== Club career ==
He started playing in the Ukrainian second and third tier in the FC Dynamo Kyiv system.

He made his debut in the Russian Second Division for FC Dolgoprudny on 20 April 2013 in a game against FC Karelia Petrozavodsk.
