= Andrei Myazin =

Russian footballer

Personal information
- Full name: Andrei Aleksandrovich Myazin
- Date of birth: 27 October 1987 (age 39)
- Place of birth: Kuybyshev, Russian SFSR, now Samara
- Height: 1.86 m (6 ft 1 in)
- Position: Forward

Senior career*
Years	Team	Apps	(Gls)
2004–2007	FC Olimpia Volgograd	48	(12)
2008–2010	FC Vityaz Podolsk	63	(20)
2011–2012	FC Volgar-Gazprom Astrakhan	39	(5)
2012–2013	FC Petrotrest St. Petersburg	31	(14)
2013–2014	FC Ufa	17	(1)
2014	→ FC Rotor Volgograd (loan)	10	(1)
2014–2015	FC Luch-Energiya Vladivostok	32	(10)
2015	FC Shinnik Yaroslavl	24	(4)
2016–2017	FC Armavir	38	(12)
2017–2018	FC Luch-Energiya Vladivostok	33	(7)
2018	FC Rotor Volgograd	23	(5)
2019	FK Palanga	16	(4)
2019–2020	FC Volgar Astrakhan	18	(6)
2020–2021	FC Avangard Kursk	33	(6)
2022	FC Lada-Tolyatti	8	(1)
- * Club domestic league appearances and goals

Andrei Aleksandrovich Myazin (Russian: Андрей Александрович Мязин; born 27 October 1987) is a Russian former professional football player.

== Club career ==
He made his Russian Football National League debut for FC Vityaz Podolsk on 27 March 2008 in a game against FC Baltika Kaliningrad.

== Honours ==
- Russian Second Division Zone Centre best player: 2010.
