= Anton Arkhipov =

Russian footballer

Anton Arkhipov Антон Архипов
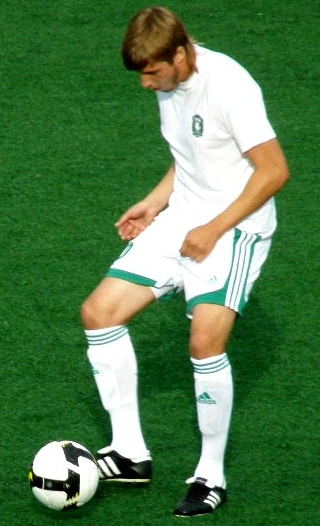

Personal information
- Full name: Anton Anatolyevich Arkhipov
- Date of birth: 4 November 1985 (age 40)
- Place of birth: Moscow, Soviet Union
- Height: 1.80 m (5 ft 11 in)
- Position: Forward

Youth career
- FC Chertanovo Moscow

Senior career*
Years	Team	Apps	(Gls)
2003	FC Spartak Schyolkovo	25	(2)
2004	Shinnik Yaroslavl	1	(0)
2005	Saturn Moscow Oblast	2	(0)
2005	FC Spartak Chelyabinsk	12	(5)
2006–2007	FC Khimki	54	(16)
2007–2010	FC Tom Tomsk	34	(2)
2009	→ Chernomorets Novorossiysk (loan)	16	(3)
2010	→ Shinnik Yaroslavl (loan)	28	(8)
2011–2012	FC Shinnik Yaroslavl	36	(7)
2012–2013	Hapoel Ramat Gan	21	(3)
2013	Hapoel Bnei Lod	8	(2)
2013	FC Rotor Volgograd	16	(3)
2014	FC Khimik Dzerzhinsk	9	(0)
2014	FC Dolgoprudny	9	(1)
2016–2017	FC Odintsovo		
- * Club domestic league appearances and goals

Anton Anatolyevich Arkhipov (Russian: Антон Анатольевич Архипов; born 4 November 1985) is a former Russian footballer.

== Club career ==
Arkhipov is a graduate of the Chertanovo Education Center.

He made his Russian Premier League debut for FC Shinnik Yaroslavl on 17 October 2004 in a game against FC Spartak Moscow.

Arkhipov joined Rotor Volgograd on 2 July 2013. In October 2013, Arkhipov was sacked by Rotor Volgograd for "appearing at work under the influence of alcohol." He made 18 appearances for Rotor and scored 3 goals.

== Honours ==
=== Khimki ===
Russian First Division: 2006
