= Aleksandr Marchenko (footballer) =

Russian footballer

Personal information
- Full name: Aleksandr Aleksandrovich Marchenko
- Date of birth: 3 February 1996 (age 30)
- Place of birth: Timashyovsk, Russia
- Height: 1.86 m (6 ft 1 in)
- Position: Centre back

Youth career
- FC Krasnodar

Senior career*
Years	Team	Apps	(Gls)
2013–2018	FC Krasnodar	0	(0)
2013–2016	→ FC Krasnodar-2	59	(2)
2015	→ FC Chernomorets Novorossiysk (loan)	9	(0)
2016–2017	→ PFC Spartak Nalchik (loan)	21	(1)
2017	→ FC Luch-Energiya Vladivostok (loan)	5	(0)
2018–2019	FC Syzran-2003	21	(0)
2019–2020	FC Zenit-Izhevsk	10	(0)
2020	FC Yessentuki	9	(0)
2021–2022	FC Biolog-Novokubansk	39	(6)
2022–2023	FC Balashikha	16	(0)
2023	FC Sakhalinets Moscow	6	(0)
2023–2024	FC Sakhalin Yuzhno-Sakhalinsk	42	(0)
2025	FC Rubin Yalta	21	(0)

International career
2011	Russia U-15	1	(0)
2011–2012	Russia U-16	8	(0)
2012	Russia U-17	2	(0)
2014	Russia U-18	4	(0)
- * Club domestic league appearances and goals as of 1 November 2025

Aleksandr Aleksandrovich Marchenko (Russian: Александр Александрович Марченко; born 3 February 1996) is a Russian football player.

== Club career ==
He made his debut in the Russian Professional Football League for FC Krasnodar-2 on 12 July 2013 in a game against FC Chernomorets Novorossiysk.

He made his debut for the senior squad of FC Krasnodar on 30 October 2013 in a Russian Cup game against FSC Dolgoprudny.

He made his Russian Football National League debut for PFC Spartak Nalchik on 6 August 2016 in a game against FC Yenisey Krasnoyarsk.
