= Stadion Kirovets =

Football stadium in Tikhvin, Russia

- Interactive map of Stadion Kirovets
- Full name: Stadion Kirovets
- Location: Tikhvin, Russia
- Coordinates: 59.6496623°N 33.5500657°E
- Owner: F.C. Leningradets
- Capacity: 3,986
- Surface: Astroturf
- Field size: 105 x 67

Construction
- Built: 2008
- Opened: 2011
- Cost: ₽9,000,000

Tenant
- FC Leningradets

Stadion Kirovets (Russian: Стадион "Кировец") or Kirovets Football Stadium (Russian: Футбольный Стадион "Кировец") is a football stadium located in Tikhvin, Russia. Since 2018 it is the home stadium of FC Leningradets.

== Construction ==
The construction started in 1941 as Russia entered the Second World War. Due to financial issues, it finished 67 years later, on 24 September 2008.

The stadium has been on hold for more than 60 years, but has been continued due to the 'National Soccer Academy' fundings by Roman Abramovich and Rossport.

== Facilities ==
2,500 seats in the Eastern Sector are domed by a metallic block, protecting the stadium from rain and other precipitates.
