= Jano Ananidze =

Georgian professional footballer

Jano Ananidze ჯანო ანანიძე
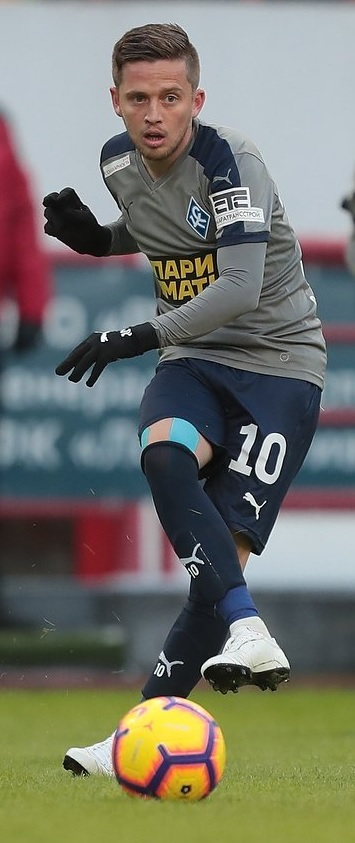
- Ananidze playing for Krylia Sovetov in 2019

Personal information
- Date of birth: 10 October 1992 (age 34)
- Place of birth: Kobuleti, Georgia
- Height: 1.71 m (5 ft 7 in)
- Position: Attacking midfielder

Youth career
- 2002–2003: Shukura Kobuleti
- 2003–2005: Norchi Dinamo Tbilisi
- 2005–2007: Dynamo Kyiv
- 2007–2009: Spartak Moscow

Senior career*
Years	Team	Apps	(Gls)
2009–2019	Spartak Moscow	122	(12)
2013–2014	→ Rostov (loan)	22	(3)
2019	→ Krylia Sovetov Samara (loan)	8	(1)
2020	Anorthosis Famagusta	6	(0)
2020	Rotor Volgograd	0	(0)
2021–2022	Dinamo Tbilisi	1	(0)
2021–2022	Dinamo Batumi	5	(0)
Total		164	(16)

International career
2007	Georgia U16	4	(3)
2007-2009	Georgia U17	13	(0)
2009	Georgia U19	2	(1)
2009–2013	Georgia U-21	6	(2)
2009–2022	Georgia	43	(7)
- * Club domestic league appearances and goals

Jano Ananidze (Georgian: ჯანო ანანიძე, pronounced [dʒano ananidze]; born 10 October 1992) is a Georgian former professional footballer who played as a midfielder.

== Club career ==
=== Spartak Moscow ===
Ananidze appeared in Spartak Moscow colours in spring of 2009, initially playing for its junior's team, scoring four goals in twelve games. During the midseason break Valery Karpin moved Ananidze from juniors into the main team, then on a training tour in Austria. Ananidze debuted in Russian Cup on 15 July 2009, scoring a goal against first division Krasnodar. On 1 August 2009, Ananidze debuted in regular 2009 Russian Premier League championship, substituting Alex in the 69th minute of the game.

On 18 October 2009, he became the youngest player ever to score a goal in the Russian Premier League when he scored for Spartak Moscow against Lokomotiv Moscow at the age of 17 years and 8 days.

After a successful ending of his debut season, Jano was on the radar of Arsenal, Milan and Juventus. Spartak Moscow sporting director Dmitri Popov insisted the club would not listen to offers until Ananidze was at least in his 20s.

In September 2012, before the 2014 World Cup qualification match against Spain, Iker Casillas named Ananidze as one of the key players of the Georgia national team alongside the keeper Giorgi Loria.

On 21 January 2020, his contract with Spartak was terminated by mutual consent, 13 years after he originally joined the club's academy.

=== FC Rostov ===
On 3 July 2013, he went on a one-year loan to FC Rostov.

=== Krylia Sovetov Samara ===
On 13 January 2019, he joined Krylia Sovetov Samara on loan until the end of the 2018–19 season.

=== Rotor Volgograd ===
On 6 August 2020, he returned to Russian Premier League and signed with Rotor Volgograd. His Rotor contract was terminated by mutual consent on 12 September 2020 due to a knee injury.

=== Dinamo Tbilisi ===
On 29 April 2021, Ananidze returned to his native Georgia, joining Dinamo Tbilisi on a one-year contract, with the option of an additional year. On 3 December 2021, Dinamo Tbilisi announced the departure of Ananidze after playing only 26 minutes for the club.

In April 2022, Jano announced his retirement ended his career due to multiple injuries. For the last three months he played in Dinamo Batumi and during this period he appeared on the field for only 122 minutes in total.

== International career ==
In March 2009 UEFA web site listed Ananidze as one of three "key players" of Georgian U-17 team along with Nika Dzalamidze and Irakli Shekiladze. In July 2009 Ananidze received and accepted Héctor Cúper's invitation to the Georgia national team. Ananidze told Russian media "don't worry about me. I made my choice. I am a Georgian and I will play for my country." (Russian: "переживать не стоит. Я сделал свой выбор. Я грузин и буду играть за сборную своей страны").

He made his debut for Georgia in a 2–0 home defeat by Italy on 5 September 2009. He scored his first goal against Slovenia in Koper on 17 November 2010. Then he scored against Moldova from the penalty spot and Georgia won this match 2–0 on 11 November 2011.

== Career statistics ==
=== Club ===
Appearances and goals by club, season and competition
Club	Season	League			Cup		Europe		Other		Total	
Club	Season	Division	Apps	Goals	Apps	Goals	Apps	Goals	Apps	Goals	Apps	Goals
Spartak Moscow	2009	Russian Premier League	8	2	1	1	0	0	–		9	3
Spartak Moscow	2010	Russian Premier League	23	2	0	0	2	0	–		25	2
Spartak Moscow	2011–12	Russian Premier League	15	1	2	0	3	1	–		20	2
Spartak Moscow	2012–13	Russian Premier League	15	3	2	1	3	0	–		20	4
Spartak Moscow	2014–15	Russian Premier League	15	0	0	0	0	0	–		15	0
Spartak Moscow	2015–16	Russian Premier League	11	0	0	0	0	0	–		11	0
Spartak Moscow	2016–17	Russian Premier League	22	4	0	0	2	1	–		24	5
Spartak Moscow	2017–18	Russian Premier League	6	0	1	0	0	0	1 (Note: Appearance in Russian Super Cup)	0	8	0
Spartak Moscow	2018–19	Russian Premier League	1	0	1	0	1	0	–		3	0
Spartak Moscow	2019–20	Russian Premier League	6	0	1	0	3	0	–		10	0
Spartak Moscow	Total	Russian Premier League	122	12	8	2	14	2	1	0	145	16
Rostov (loan)	2013–14	Russian Premier League	22	3	3	2	0	0	–		25	5
Krylia Sovetov Samara (loan)	2018–19	Russian Premier League	8	1	0	0	0	0	–		8	1
Anorthosis Famagusta	2019–20	Cypriot First Division	6	0	2	0	0	0	–		8	0
Rotor Volgograd	2020–21	Russian Premier League	0	0	0	0	0	0	–		0	0
Dinamo Tbilisi	2021	Erovnuli Liga	1	0	0	0	0	0	–		1	0
Dinamo Batumi	2022	Erovnuli Liga	5	0	0	0	0	0	1 (Note: Appearance in Georgian Super Cup)	0	6	0
Career total			164	16	13	4	14	2	2	0	193	22

=== International ===
Scores and results list Georgia's goal tally first, score column indicates score after each Ananidze goal.

List of international goals scored by Jano Ananidze
No.	Date	Venue	Opponent	Score	Result	Competition
1	17 November 2010	Bonifika Stadium, Koper, Slovenia	Slovenia	2–1	2–1	Friendly
2	11 November 2011	Mikheil Meskhi Stadium, Tbilisi, Georgia	Moldova	3–0	3–0	Friendly
3	5 March 2014	Mikheil Meskhi Stadium, Tbilisi, Georgia	Liechtenstein	2–0	2–0	Friendly
4	5 September 2016	Boris Paichadze Dinamo Arena, Tbilisi, Georgia	Austria	1–2	1–2	2018 FIFA World Cup qualification
5	28 March 2017	Boris Paichadze Dinamo Arena, Tbilisi, Georgia	Latvia	1–0	5–0	Friendly
6	28 March 2017	Boris Paichadze Dinamo Arena, Tbilisi, Georgia	Latvia	4–0	5–0	Friendly
7	5 September 2019	Başakşehir Fatih Terim Stadium, Istanbul, Turkey	South Korea	1–0	2–2	Friendly

== Honours ==
Spartak Moscow

- Russian Premier League: 2016–17
- Russian Super Cup: 2017

Rostov

- Russian Cup: 2013–14

Dinamo Batumi

- Georgian Super Cup: 2022
