= Denis Klopkov =

Russian footballer

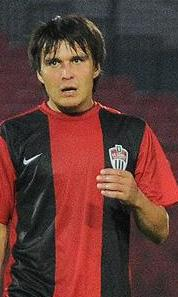
- Denis Klopkov in 2010

Personal information
- Full name: Denis Nikolayevich Klopkov
- Date of birth: 4 March 1986 (age 40)
- Place of birth: Ulyanovsk, Russian SFSR
- Height: 1.70 m (5 ft 7 in)
- Position: Midfielder

Youth career
- DYuSSh Start Ulyanovsk

Senior career*
Years	Team	Apps	(Gls)
2004–2006	FC Stroyplastmass Poldomasovo		
2007–2008	FC Volga Ulyanovsk	63	(11)
2009	FC Nosta Novotroitsk	19	(1)
2009–2010	FC Salyut Belgorod	24	(3)
2010	FC Khimki	16	(2)
2011–2012	FC Fakel Voronezh	61	(8)
2013	FC Zhetysu	0	(0)
2013–2016	FC Luch-Energiya Vladivostok	93	(2)
2016–2020	FC Armavir	109	(1)
2020	FC Volga Ulyanovsk	10	(1)
- * Club domestic league appearances and goals

Denis Nikolayevich Klopkov (Russian: Денис Николаевич Клопков; born 4 March 1986) is a Russian former professional football player.

== Club career ==
He made his Russian Football National League debut for FC Volga Ulyanovsk on 6 April 2008 in a game against FC Alania Vladikavkaz.

== Personal life ==
His wife's name is Lilia and he has a daughter. His ethnic group is Chuvashian.
