= Maksim Yakovlev =

Russian footballer

Personal information
- Full name: Maksim Sergeyevich Yakovlev
- Date of birth: 8 September 1991 (age 35)
- Place of birth: Frunze, Kyrgyz SSR
- Height: 1.75 m (5 ft 9 in)
- Position: Midfielder

Team information
- Current team: Atyrá F.C.

Youth career
- FC Kant-77
- Konoplyov football academy

Senior career*
| Years | Team | Apps | (Gls) |
| 2008 | FC Academia Dimitrovgrad | 30 | (1) |
| 2009 | FC Togliatti | 30 | (0) |
| 2010–2012 | FC Akademiya Togliatti | 60 | (6) |
| 2012–2013 | FC Salyut Belgorod | 48 | (2) |
| 2014 | FC Rotor Volgograd | 9 | (0) |
| 2014–2015 | FC Gazovik Orenburg | 18 | (0) |
| 2015–2017 | FC Volgar Astrakhan | 44 | (0) |
| 2017–2018 | FC Khimki | 31 | (1) |
| 2019 | FC Chayka Peschanokopskoye | 9 | (1) |
| 2019–2020 | FC Olimp Khimki | 16 | (0) |
| 2020 | FC Zenit Irkutsk | 10 | (1) |
| 2021–2022 | PFC Dynamo Stavropol | 41 | (0) |
| 2022 | FC Mashuk-KMV Pyatigorsk | 4 | (0) |
| 2022–2023 | FC Peresvet Domodedovo | 24 | (1) |
| 2023– | Atyrá F.C. | 0 | (0) |
- * Club domestic league appearances and goals as of 10 June 2023

Maksim Sergeyevich Yakovlev (Russian: Максим Серге́евич Яковлев; born 8 September 1991) is a Russian professional football player. He plays for Paraguayan club Atyrá F.C.

== Club career ==
He made his Russian Football National League debut for FC Salyut Belgorod on 10 July 2012 in a game against FC Sibir Novosibirsk.
