= Central Stadium (Volgograd) =

Former sports venue in Volgograd, Russia

Central Stadium (Центральный стадион)
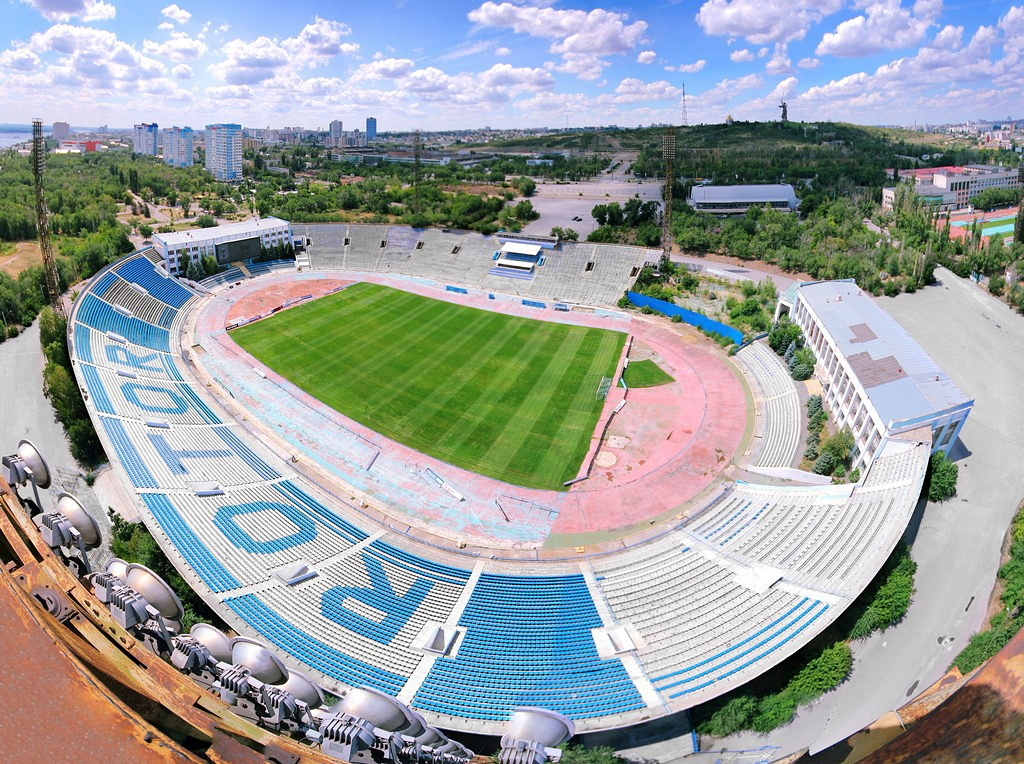
- Interactive map of Central Stadium (Центральный стадион)
- Full name: Volgograd Arena
- Location: Volgograd, Russia
- Coordinates: 48°44′4″N 44°32′54″E
- Capacity: 32,120 (45,000)
- Field size: 110m x 72m

Construction
- Built: 1962
- Opened: 27 September 1962
- Renovated: 2002
- Closed: 19 May 2014 (planned reconstruction)

Tenant
- FC Rotor Volgograd

Central Stadium (Russian: Центральный стадион, Tsentralnyi Stadion) was a multi-purpose stadium in Volgograd, Russia, that was a home to FC Rotor Volgograd. It was built in 1962 and renovated in 2002. The capacity of the stadium was 32,120. The stadium was closed and demolished in 2014. A new stadium was built in its place in time for the 2018 FIFA World Cup.
