= Ivan Zvyagin =

Russian footballer

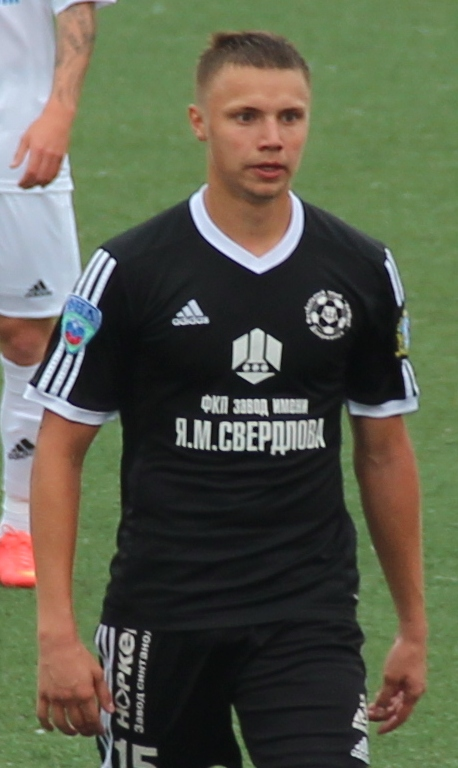

Personal information
- Full name: Ivan Sergeyevich Zvyagin
- Date of birth: 17 September 1991 (age 35)
- Height: 1.76 m (5 ft 9 1/2 in)
- Position: Midfielder

Senior career*
Years	Team	Apps	(Gls)
2013–2014	FC Dolgoprudny	40	(2)
2014	FC Khimik Dzerzhinsk	15	(1)
2015	FC Solyaris Moscow	16	(1)
- * Club domestic league appearances and goals

Ivan Sergeyevich Zvyagin (Russian: Иван Серге́евич Звягин; born 17 September 1991) is a former Russian football midfielder.

== Club career ==
He made his debut in the Russian Second Division for FC Dolgoprudny on 20 April 2013 in a game against FC Karelia Petrozavodsk.

He made his Russian Football National League debut for FC Khimik Dzerzhinsk on 6 July 2014 in a game against PFC Krylia Sovetov Samara.
