= Roman Voydel =

Russian footballer

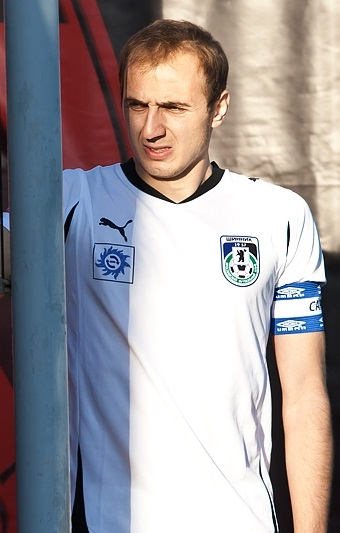

Personal information
- Full name: Roman Igorevich Voydel
- Date of birth: 16 July 1985 (age 41)
- Place of birth: Lipetsk, Russian SFSR
- Height: 1.84 m (6 ft 0 in)
- Position: Midfielder

Youth career
- FC Metallurg Lipetsk

Senior career*
Years	Team	Apps	(Gls)
2003–2006	FC Metallurg Lipetsk	90	(6)
2007–2008	FC Luch-Energiya Vladivostok	1	(0)
2008	FC Baltika Kaliningrad	20	(0)
2009–2011	FC Shinnik Yaroslavl	101	(7)
2012	FC Baltika Kaliningrad	9	(0)
2012–2013	FC Ufa	28	(2)
2013–2014	FC Rotor Volgograd	26	(1)
2014–2016	FC Shinnik Yaroslavl	48	(1)
2016–2017	FC Armavir	40	(6)
2017	FC Tom Tomsk	18	(1)
2018–2024	FC Metallurg Lipetsk	172	(8)
- * Club domestic league appearances and goals

Roman Igorevich Voydel (Russian: Рома́н И́горевич Во́йдель; born 16 July 1985) is a Russian former professional footballer.

== Club career ==
A product of FC Metallurg Lipetsk's youth system, Voydel began his professional career playing for the club in the Russian First Division and Russian Second Division. He made his debut in the Russian Premier League in 2007 for FC Luch-Energiya Vladivostok.
