= Oleksandr Malyhin =

Ukrainian footballer

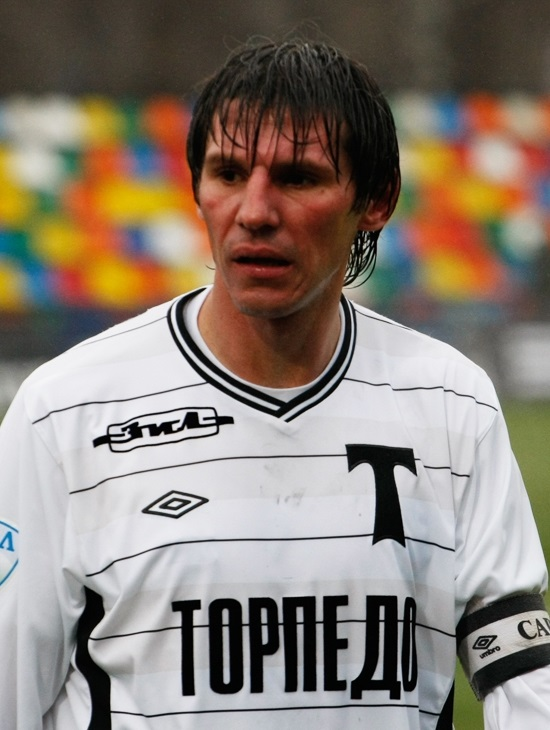
- With Torpedo Moscow in 2011

Personal information
- Full name: Oleksandr Volodymyrovych Malyhin
- Date of birth: 27 November 1979 (age 46)
- Place of birth: Luhansk, Soviet Union
- Height: 1.89 m (6 ft 2 in)
- Position: Defender

Senior career*
Years	Team	Apps	(Gls)
1996–1998	Zorya Luhansk	31	(1)
1998–1999	Rostselmash-2 Rostov-on-Don	42	(3)
1999–2000	Kryvbas Kryvyi Rih	0	(0)
2000–2002	Rostselmash Rostov-on-Don	25	(0)
2003	Terek Grozny	0	(0)
2003–2004	Ural Sverdlovsk Oblast	45	(3)
2005	SKA Rostov-on-Don	11	(0)
2005–2007	Zorya Luhansk	47	(0)
2007	Illichivets Mariupol	10	(1)
2007–2009	Simurq Zaqatala	73	(1)
2010	Zakarpattia Uzhhorod	10	(0)
2011–2012	Torpedo Moscow	34	(2)
2012–2014	Rotor Volgograd	43	(2)

International career
1995	Ukraine U19	3	(0)
- * Club domestic league appearances and goals

Oleksandr Volodymyrovych Malyhin (Ukrainian: Олександр Володимирович Малигін; Russian: Александр Владимирович Малыгин; born on 27 November 1979) is a Ukrainian former footballer who played as a defender. He also has Russian citizenship.

== Club career ==
He scored the first goal in the history of FC Rostov in the European club tournaments.

== Personal life ==
His father Volodymyr Malyhin and his brother Yuriy Malyhin were both professional footballers as well.
