= 2012–13 FC Rotor Volgograd season =

Rotor Volgograd
2012–13 season
- Chairman: Sergei Nechay
- Manager: Valeri Burlachenko
- Stadium: Tsentralniy, Volgograd
- RNFL: 9th
- Russian Cup: Fifth round vs Astrakhan
- RNFL Cup: 5th
- Top goalscorer: League: Aleksandr Stavpets (9); All: Aleksandr Stavpets (9)
- Highest home attendance: 14,500 vs Ufa; 7 August 2012
- Lowest home attendance: 6,000
- Average home league attendance: 9,425
Home colours	Away colours	Third colours

The 2012–13 Rotor Volgograd season was the 2nd season that the club played in the Russian National Football League.

== Squad ==
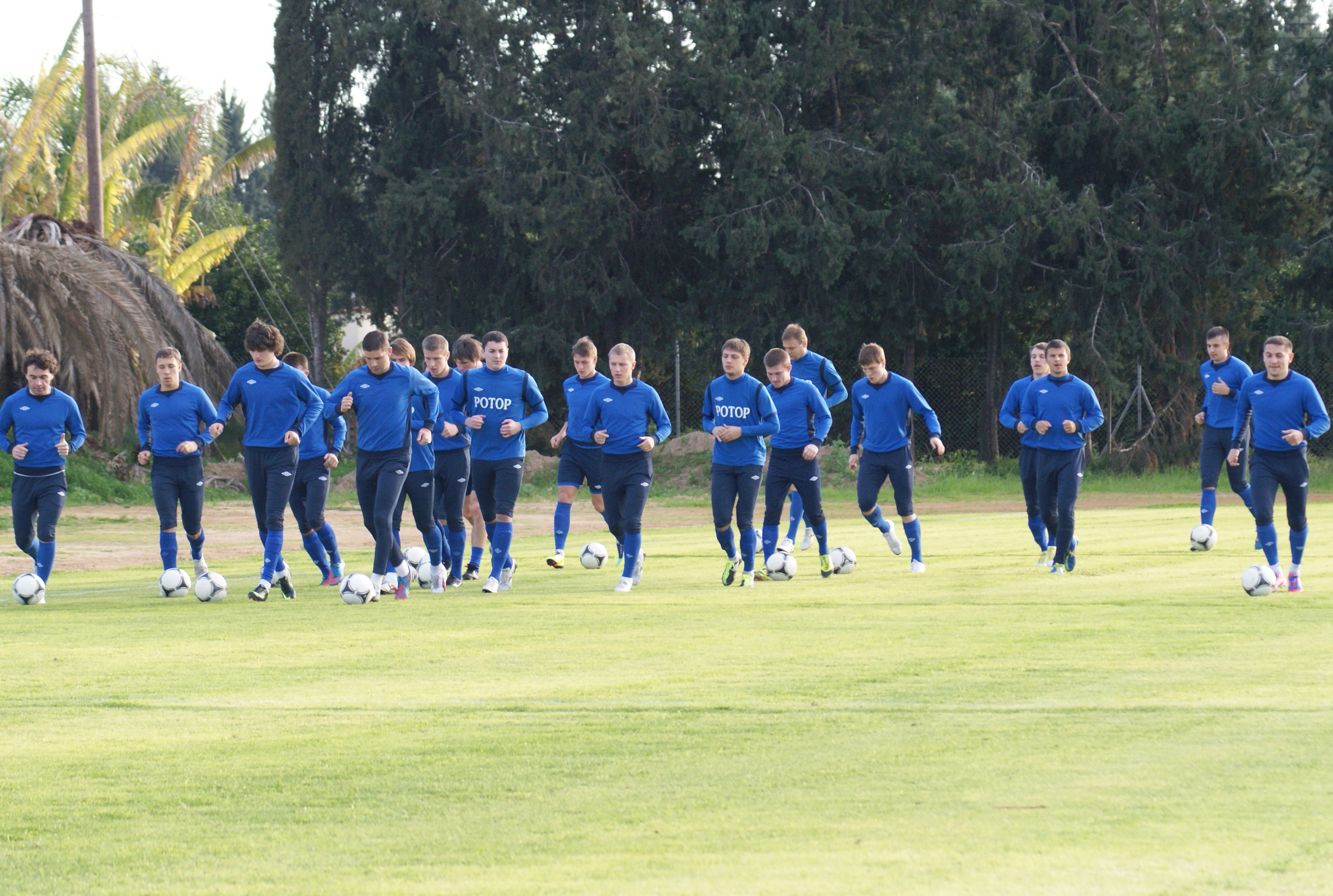
Players on training. Paphos. February 2013

As of 25 May 2013

Note: Flags indicate national team as defined under FIFA eligibility rules; some limited exceptions apply. Players may hold more than one non-FIFA nationality.

No.	Pos.	Nation	Player
1	GK	RUS	Aleksandr Malyshev
2	DF	RUS	Ilya Ionov
3	DF	RUS	Nikolai Olenikov
5	DF	RUS	Dmitri Guz
6	DF	UKR	Aleksandr Malygin (captain)
7	FW	RUS	Sergei Shumilin
9	MF	RUS	Aleksandr Nechayev
10	MF	RUS	Artur Rylov
11	FW	RUS	Aleksandr Stavpets
13	FW	RUS	Aleksandr Korotayev
14	MF	RUS	Semyon Fomin
16	GK	RUS	Denis Pchelintsev
19	MF	SRB	Ivan Todorović

No.	Pos.	Nation	Player
20	FW	RUS	Khyzyr Appayev
22	MF	RUS	Nikita Glushkov
23	MF	RUS	Sergei Vaganov
25	MF	RUS	Aleksandr Leontiev
27	DF	RUS	Mikhail Merkulov
31	DF	RUS	Andrei Vasyanovich
33	GK	RUS	Aleksandr Bondar
38	MF	RUS	Oleg Aleynik
77	DF	RUS	Deviko Khinchagov
87	MF	RUS	Aleksei Pugin
88	DF	RUS	Ilya Zinin
90	MF	RUS	Denis Arlashin
92	FW	RUS	Dmitri Kabutov

== Transfers ==
=== Summer ===
In: Note: Flags indicate national team as defined under FIFA eligibility rules; some limited exceptions apply. Players may hold more than one non-FIFA nationality.

No.	Pos.	Nation	Player
6	DF	UKR	Aleksandr Malygin (from (Russia) Torpedo Moscow)
10	MF	RUS	Artur Rylov (from (Russia) Torpedo Moscow)
14	MF	RUS	Semyon Fomin (on loan from (Russia) Lokomotiv Moscow)
11	FW	RUS	Aleksandr Stavpets (from (Russia) Ural Ekaterinburg)
16	GK	RUS	Denis Pchelintsev (from (Russia) Baltika Kaliningrad)
19	MF	SRB	Ivan Todorović (from (Portugal) Nacional)
23	MF	RUS	Sergei Vaganov (on loan from (Russia) Volga Nizhny Novgorod)
25	MF	RUS	Aleksandr Leontiev (from Youth system)
28	FW	RUS	Vasili Karmazinenko (from (Russia) Volgar-Gazprom Astrakhan)
31	DF	RUS	Andrei Vasyanovich (on loan from (Russia) CSKA Moscow)
77	DF	RUS	Deviko Khinchagov (from (Russia) MITOS Novocherkassk)
83	GK	RUS	Mikhail Baranovskiy (from (Russia) Dynamo Bryansk)
87	MF	RUS	Aleksei Pugin (from (Russia) Dynamo Bryansk)
88	DF	RUS	Ilya Zinin (from (Russia) Torpedo Vladimir)

Out: Note: Flags indicate national team as defined under FIFA eligibility rules; some limited exceptions apply. Players may hold more than one non-FIFA nationality.

No.	Pos.	Nation	Player
4	MF	RUS	Sergei Shudrov (to (Russia) Sever Murmansk)
7	FW	RUS	Viktor Borisov (to (Russia) Sever Murmansk)
8	MF	RUS	Maksim Primak (to (Russia) Energiya Volzhsky)
10	DF	RUS	Stepan Ryabokon (on loan to (Russia) Energiya Volzhsky)
13	DF	RUS	Roman Semyakin (to (Russia) Tyumen)
16	GK	RUS	Valeri Polyakov (on loan to (Russia) Energiya Volzhsky)
18	FW	RUS	Roman Smolskiy (to (Russia) MITOS Novocherkassk)
19	FW	RUS	Vladislav Khrushchak (on loan to (Russia) Energiya Volzhsky)
21	MF	RUS	Vyacheslav Sostin (to (Russia) MITOS Novocherkassk)
26	MF	RUS	Nikolai Fiyev (to (Russia) Biolog-Novokubansk)
27	DF	RUS	Mikhail Merkulov (on loan to (Russia) Energiya Volzhsky)
74	FW	RUS	Denis Zubko (to (Russia) Energiya Volzhsky)

=== Winter ===
In: Note: Flags indicate national team as defined under FIFA eligibility rules; some limited exceptions apply. Players may hold more than one non-FIFA nationality.

No.	Pos.	Nation	Player
13	FW	RUS	Aleksandr Korotayev (from (Russia) Akademiya Togliatti)
20	FW	RUS	Khyzyr Appayev (on loan from (Russia) Krasnodar)
23	MF	RUS	Sergei Vaganov (from (Russia) Volga Nizhny Novgorod)
27	DF	RUS	Mikhail Merkulov (end of loan from (Russia) Energiya Volzhsky)
33	GK	RUS	Aleksandr Bondar (from Youth system)
92	FW	RUS	Dmitri Kabutov (from (Russia) Salyut Belgorod)
—	FW	RUS	Vladislav Khrushchak (end of loan from (Russia) Energiya Volzhsky)

Out: Note: Flags indicate national team as defined under FIFA eligibility rules; some limited exceptions apply. Players may hold more than one non-FIFA nationality.

No.	Pos.	Nation	Player
8	MF	RUS	Sergei Rashevsky (to (Russia) Luch-Energiya Vladivostok)
23	MF	RUS	Sergei Vaganov (end of loan to (Russia) Volga Nizhny Novgorod)
28	FW	RUS	Vasili Karmazinenko (to (Russia) SKA-Energiya Khabarovsk)
83	GK	RUS	Mikhail Baranovskiy (to (Russia) Ufa)

== Competitions ==
=== Friendlies ===
21 June 2012 Pre-season	Rotor Volgograd	2–1	Kuban Krasnodar	(Austria) Vösendorf
	1:0 Shumilin 37'; 2:1 Aleynik 69' (pen.)	Summary	1:1 Komkov 60'	Stadium: Vösendorf

24 June 2012 Pre-season	Rotor Volgograd (Russia)	0–0	(Slovakia) Ružomberok	(Hungary) Bük
	Nechayev (penalty missed) 32'

27 June 2012 Pre-season	Rotor Volgograd (Russia)	3–1	(Romania) CSMS Iași	(Hungary) Bük
	1:1 Aleynik 32'; 2:1 Arlashin 78'; 3:1 Rashevsky 90'		0:1 Ionescu 12'

3 July 2012 Pre-season	Rotor Volgograd	1–1	Sokol Saratov	Volgograd
	1:0 Stavpets 30'		1:1 Timachev 83'	Stadium: Tsentralniy

19 January 2013 Mid-season	Rotor Volgograd (Russia)	0–1	(Azerbaijan) Neftchi Baku	(Turkey) Aksu
			0:1 Nasimov 73'	Stadium: Mardan

22 January 2013 Mid-season	Rotor Volgograd (Russia)	1–0	(Kazakhstan) Shakhter Karagandy	(Turkey) Belek
	1:0 Shumilin 80'

25 January 2013 Mid-season	Rotor Volgograd (Russia)	0–0	(Kazakhstan) Vostok	(Turkey) Belek
	Todorović (penalty missed) 50'

28 February 2013 Mid-season	Rotor Volgograd	0–0	Baltika Kaliningrad	(Turkey) Belek

4 March 2013 Mid-season	Rotor Volgograd (Russia)	0–1	(Belarus) Dinamo Minsk	(Turkey) Belek
			0:1 Curelea 13'

=== Russian National Football League ===
==== Results ====
9 July 2012 1	Rotor Volgograd	1–0	Tom Tomsk	Volgograd
21:00 MSK (UTC+4)	1:0 Stavpets 18'	Summary		Stadium: Tsentralniy; Attendance: 12,000; Referee: Aleksei Sukhoy (Lyubertsy)

16 July 2012 2	Sibir Novosibirsk	1–1	Rotor Volgograd	Novosibirsk
17:00 MSK (UTC+4)	1:0 Shevchenko 39'	Summary	1:1 Rylov 46'	Stadium: Spartak; Attendance: 5,000; Referee: Vyacheslav Kharlamov (Moscow)

22 July 2012 3	Rotor Volgograd	1–0	Khimki	Volgograd
19:00 MSK (UTC+4)	1:0 Stavpets 74' (pen.)	Summary		Stadium: Tsentralniy; Attendance: 13,200; Referee: Timur Arslanbekov (Moscow)

30 July 2012 4	Baltika Kaliningrad	0–1	Rotor Volgograd	Kaliningrad
20:00 MSK (UTC+4)		Summary	0:1 Stavpets 24' (pen.)	Stadium: Baltika; Attendance: 8,200; Referee: Vladislav Bezborodov (St. Petersburg)

7 August 2012 5	Rotor Volgograd	0–1	Ufa	Volgograd
20:00 MSK (UTC+4)		Summary	0:1 Popov 58'	Stadium: Tsentralniy; Attendance: 14,500; Referee: Sergei Kuznetsov (Krasnozavodsk)

17 August 2012 7	Rotor Volgograd	2–1	Neftekhimik Nizhnekamsk	Volgograd
18:30 MSK (UTC+4)	1:0 Stavpets 53' (pen.); 2:1 Todorović 88'	Summary	1:1 Nurov 84'	Stadium: Tsentralniy; Attendance: 10,100; Referee: Vladimir Rogulev (Lomonosov)

22 August 2012 8	Shinnik Yaroslavl	1–0	Rotor Volgograd	Yaroslavl
18:00 MSK (UTC+4)	1:0 Karytska 67' (pen.)	Summary		Stadium: Shinnik; Attendance: 3,200; Referee: Aleksei Matyunin (Moscow)

27 August 2012 9	Rotor Volgograd	0–4	Ural Yekaterinburg	Volgograd
18:00 MSK (UTC+4)		Summary	0:1 Gerk 19'; 0:2 Acevedo 73'; 0:3 Tumasyan 79'; 0:4 Gogniyev 85' (pen.)	Stadium: Tsentralniy; Attendance: 9,800; Referee: Sergei Ivanov (Rostov-on-Don)

6 September 2012 10	Yenisey Krasnoyarsk	0–0	Rotor Volgograd	Krasnoyarsk
15:00 MSK (UTC+4)		Summary		Stadium: Tsentralniy; Attendance: 4,200; Referee: Vladimir Kazmenko (Rostov-on-Don)

10 September 2012 11	Rotor Volgograd	1–0	Metallurg-Kuzbass Novokuznetsk	Volgograd
18:00 MSK (UTC+4)	1:0 Karmazinenko 18'	Summary		Stadium: Tsentralniy; Attendance: 6,000; Referee: Vladimir Moskalyov (Voronezh)

17 September 2012 12	SKA-Energiya Khabarovsk	1–1	Rotor Volgograd	Khabarovsk
08:00 MSK (UTC+4)	1:0 Krendelew 54'	Summary	1:1 Vasyanovich 87'	Stadium: Lenin; Attendance: 3,000; Referee: Denis Shpilev (Belgorod)

21 September 2012 13	Rotor Volgograd	0–1	Spartak-Nalchik	Volgograd
19:00 MSK (UTC+4)		Summary	0:1 Koronov 77'	Stadium: Tsentralniy; Attendance: 9,500; Referee: German Kravchenko (Pskov)

1 October 2012 14	Torpedo Moscow	0–0	Rotor Volgograd	Moscow
20:00 MSK (UTC+4)		Summary		Stadium: Eduard Streltsov; Attendance: 0 Referee: Vladimir Seldyakov (Balashikha)

8 October 2012 15	Rotor Volgograd	3–1	Volgar Astrakhan	Volgograd
19:00 MSK (UTC+4)	1:0 Karmazinenko 53'; 2:0 Rylov 71'; 3:0 Shumilin 89'	Summary	3:1 Gonezhukov 90+' (pen.)	Stadium: Tsentralniy; Attendance: 8,000; Referee: Vasili Kazartsev (St. Petersburg)

15 October 2012 16	Salyut Belgorod	1–0	Rotor Volgograd	Belgorod
19:00 MSK (UTC+4)	1:0 Tkachuk 60'	Summary		Stadium: Salyut; Attendance: 1,200; Referee: Sergei Kulikov (Saransk)

22 October 2012 17	Rotor Volgograd	2–0	Petrotrest Saint Petersburg	Volgograd
19:00 MSK (UTC+4)	1:0 Stavpets 40'; 2:0 Olenikov 63'	Summary		Stadium: Tsentralniy; Attendance: 7,500; Referee: Igor Fedotov (Moscow)

26 October 2012 18	Rotor Volgograd	2–0	Sibir Novosibirsk	Volgograd
20:00 MSK (UTC+4)	1:0 Rylov 18'; 2:0 Pugin 87'	Summary		Stadium: Tsentralniy; Attendance: 8,000; Referee: Denis Shpilev (Belgorod)

5 November 2012 20	Rotor Volgograd	3–0	Baltika Kaliningrad	Volgograd
17:00 MSK (UTC+4)	1:0 Stavpets 58' (pen.); 2:0 Stavpets 67'; 3:0 Fomin 88' (pen.)	Summary		Stadium: Tsentralniy; Attendance: 10,200; Referee: Vladimir Seldyakov (Balashikha)

12 November 2012 21	Ufa	1–0	Rotor Volgograd	Ufa
16:30 MSK (UTC+4)	1:0 Markosov 61'	Summary		Stadium: Dynamo; Attendance: 3,500; Referee: Vladimir Moskalyov (Voronezh)

16 November 2012 19	Khimki	1–0	Rotor Volgograd	Khimki
19:15 MSK (UTC+4)	1:0 Voronkin 23'	Summary		Stadium: Rodina; Attendance: 1,500; Referee: Kirill Levnikov (St. Petersburg)

11 March 2013 23	Neftekhimik Nizhnekamsk	0–2	Rotor Volgograd	Khimki
14:00 MSK (UTC+4)	Nurov (penalty missed) 45'	Summary	0:1 Vaganov 13'; Fomin (penalty missed) 18'; 0:2 Korotayev 53'	Stadium: Novye Khimki; Attendance: 300; Referee: Maksim Layushkin (Moscow)

18 March 2013 24	Rotor Volgograd	0–0	Shinnik Yaroslavl	Volgograd
19:00 MSK (UTC+4)		Summary		Stadium: Tsentralniy; Attendance: 10,700; Referee: Roman Chernov (Moscow)

25 March 2013 25	Ural Yekaterinburg	1–1	Rotor Volgograd	Yekaterinburg
16:00 MSK (UTC+4)	1:0 Tumasyan 44'	Summary	1:1 Zinin 75'	Stadium: Ural; Attendance: 2,400; Referee: Aleksei Nikolaev (Moscow)

1 April 2013 26	Rotor Volgograd	0–1	Yenisey Krasnoyarsk	Volgograd
19:00 MSK (UTC+4)		Summary	0:1 Pyatikopov 63'	Stadium: Tsentralniy; Attendance: 9,800; Referee: Lasha Verulidze (Vladikavkaz)

9 April 2013 27	Metallurg-Kuzbass Novokuznetsk	2–1	Rotor Volgograd	Novokuznetsk
16:00 MSK (UTC+4)	1:1 Malygin 57' (ag.); 2:1 Shpakov 64'	Summary	0:1 Fomin 49'; Fomin (penalty missed) 90+'	Stadium: Metallurg; Attendance: 1,500; Referee: Vladimir Rogulev (Lomonosov)

16 April 2013 28	Rotor Volgograd	1–2	SKA-Energiya Khabarovsk	Volgograd
18:15 MSK (UTC+4)	1:2 Kabutov 54'	Summary	0:1 Martsvaladze 25'; 0:2 Martsvaladze 37'	Stadium: Tsentralniy; Attendance: 8,000; Referee: Igor Nizovtsev (Nizhny Novgorod)

23 April 2013 29	Spartak-Nalchik	1–1	Rotor Volgograd	Nalchik
18:00 MSK (UTC+4)	1:0 Buitrago 5'	Summary	1:1 Malygin 89'	Stadium: Spartak; Attendance: 1,500; Referee: Vitali Rushakov (Arkhangelsk)

29 April 2013 30	Rotor Volgograd	0–0	Torpedo Moscow	Volgograd
19:00 MSK (UTC+4)		Summary		Stadium: Tsentralniy; Attendance: 7,500; Referee: Sergei Smirnov (Kislovodsk)

7 May 2013 31	Volgar Astrakhan	1–0	Rotor Volgograd	Astrakhan
19:00 MSK (UTC+4)	1:0 Degtyaryov 78'	Summary		Stadium: Tsentralniy; Attendance: 2,500; Referee: Evgeni Turbin (Moscow)

13 May 2013 32	Rotor Volgograd	0–1	Salyut Belgorod	Volgograd
18:30 MSK (UTC+4)		Summary	0:1 Butyrin 12'	Stadium: Tsentralniy; Attendance: 6,000; Referee: Sergei Kostevich (Kursk)

20 May 2013 33	Petrotrest Saint Petersburg	0–3	Rotor Volgograd	Saint Petersburg
14:00 MSK (UTC+4)		Summary	0:1 Stavpets 24'; 0:2 Stavpets 49'; 0:3 Appayev 89'	Stadium: MSA Petrovskiy; Attendance: 800; Referee: German Kravchenko (Pskov)

25 May 2013 34	Tom Tomsk	3–0	Rotor Volgograd	Tomsk
14:00 MSK (UTC+4)	1:0 Sorokin 33'; 2:0 Terentyev 61'; 3:0 Bazhenov 76'	Summary		Stadium: Trud; Attendance: 5,600; Referee: Vyacheslav Kharlamov (Moscow)

==== Table ====
Pos	Team	Pld	W	D	L	GF	GA	GD	Pts
1	Ural Yekaterinburg	32	19	11	2	61	18	+43	68
2	Tom Tomsk	32	19	8	5	57	34	+23	65
3	Spartak-Nalchik	32	15	8	9	32	27	+5	53
4	SKA-Energiya Khabarovsk	32	13	13	6	36	26	+10	52
5	Baltika Kaliningrad	32	14	8	10	40	33	+7	50
6	Ufa	32	13	9	10	31	30	+1	48
7	Neftekhimik Nizhnekamsk	32	13	8	11	44	40	+4	47
8	Sibir Novosibirsk	32	12	9	11	34	38	−4	45
9	Rotor Volgograd	32	11	8	13	27	26	+1	41
10	Yenisey Krasnoyarsk	32	9	12	11	30	31	−1	39
11	Shinnik Yaroslavl	32	9	12	11	28	33	−5	39
12	Petrotrest Saint Petersburg	32	10	5	17	28	43	−15	35
13	Salyut Belgorod	32	8	11	13	25	31	−6	35
14	Torpedo Moscow	32	6	15	11	29	38	−9	33
15	Metallurg-Kuzbass Novokuznetsk	32	8	6	18	19	40	−21	30
16	Khimki	32	6	10	16	23	40	−17	28
17	Volgar Astrakhan	32	5	11	16	23	39	−16	26

Promoted
Promotion play-offs
Relegated

=== Russian Cup ===
1 September 2012 Fifth round	Astrakhan	3–2	Rotor Volgograd	Astrakhan
16:00 MSK (UTC+4)	1:0 Aleksandr Yegurnev 3'; 2:1 Bolonin 25'; 3:1 Aleksandr Yegurnev 76'	Summary	1:1 Karmazinenko 21'; 3:2 Guz 90+'	Stadium: Astrakhan; Attendance: 3,000; Referee: Kirill Levnikov (St. Petersburg)

=== RNFL Cup ===
10 February 2013 1	Sibir Novosibirsk	0–2	Rotor Volgograd	(Cyprus) Paphos
13:00 MSK (UTC+4)		Summary	0:1 Korotayev 46'; 0:2 Khrushchak 67'	Stadium: Geroskipou; Attendance: 100; Referee: Aleksei Sukhoy (Lyubertsy)

13 February 2013 2	Rotor Volgograd	0–1	Spartak-Nalchik	(Cyprus) Paphos
13:00 MSK (UTC+4)		Summary	Carlos Rúa (penalty missed) 36'; 0:1 Carlos Rúa 36'	Stadium: Geroskipou; Attendance: 150; Referee: Roman Galimov (Ulan-Ude)

16 February 2013 3	Ural Yekaterinburg	1–1	Rotor Volgograd	(Cyprus) Paphos
13:00 MSK (UTC+4)	Gogniyev (penalty missed) 49'; 1:1 Shchanitsyn 49'	Summary	0:1 Fomin 5' (pen.)	Stadium: Pafiako; Attendance: 100; Referee: Dmitri Veselov (Moscow)

==== Table. Groupe «B» ====
Pos	Team	1	2	3	4	Pld	W	D	L	GF	GA	GD	P
1	Ural Yekaterinburg	–	1–0	1–1	3–1	3	2	1	0	5	2	+3	7
2	Spartak-Nalchik	0–1	–	1–0	0–0	3	1	1	1	1	1	0	4
3	Rotor Volgograd	1–1	0–1	–	2–0	3	1	1	1	3	2	+1	4
4	Sibir Novosibirsk	1–3	0–0	0–2	–	3	0	1	2	1	5	−4	1

18 February 2013 Match for 5th place	SKA-Energiya Khabarovsk	0–1	Rotor Volgograd	(Cyprus) Paphos
17:00 MSK (UTC+4)		Summary	0:1 Aleynik 53'; Stavpets (penalty missed) 76'	Stadium: Geroskipou; Attendance: 200; Referee: Aleksandr Borisov (Samara)

== Statistics ==
=== Squad statistics ===
==== Appearances and goals ====
No.	Pos	Nat	Player	Total		RNFL		Russian Cup		RNFL Cup	
No.	Pos	Nat	Player	Apps	Goals	Apps	Goals	Apps	Goals	Apps	Goals
16	GK	(Russia) RUS	Denis Pchelintsev	35	-27	32	-26	0	0	3	-1
1	GK	(Russia) RUS	Aleksandr Malyshev	2	-1	0	0	0	0	2	-1
33	GK	(Russia) RUS	Aleksandr Bondar	0	0	0	0	0	0	0	0
3	DF	(Russia) RUS	Nikolai Olenikov	32	1	29	1	0	0	3	0
88	DF	(Russia) RUS	Ilya Zinin	32	1	28	1	0	0	4	0
6	DF	(Ukraine) UKR	Aleksandr Malygin	28	1	25	1	0	0	3	0
31	DF	(Russia) RUS	Andrei Vasyanovich	26	1	21	1	1	0	4	0
5	DF	(Russia) RUS	Dmitri Guz	21	1	16	0	1	1	4	0
2	DF	(Russia) RUS	Ilya Ionov	13	0	12	0	1	0	0	0
77	DF	(Russia) RUS	Deviko Khinchagov	12	0	9	0	1	0	2	0
27	DF	(Russia) RUS	Mikhail Merkulov	3	0	0	0	0	0	3	0
10	MF	(Russia) RUS	Artur Rylov	35	3	30	3	1	0	4	0
14	MF	(Russia) RUS	Semyon Fomin	33	3	28	2	1	0	4	1
19	MF	(Serbia) SRB	Ivan Todorović	31	1	27	1	0	0	4	0
90	MF	(Russia) RUS	Denis Arlashin	29	0	25	0	0	0	4	0
23	MF	(Russia) RUS	Sergei Vaganov	27	1	26	1	1	0	0	0
22	MF	(Russia) RUS	Nikita Glushkov	24	0	20	0	0	0	4	0
9	MF	(Russia) RUS	Aleksandr Nechayev	22	0	19	0	1	0	2	0
87	MF	(Russia) RUS	Aleksei Pugin	20	1	19	1	1	0	0	0
38	MF	(Russia) RUS	Oleg Aleynik	13	1	8	0	1	0	4	1
25	MF	(Russia) RUS	Aleksandr Leontiev	0	0	0	0	0	0	0	0
11	FW	(Russia) RUS	Aleksandr Stavpets	29	9	27	9	0	0	2	0
92	FW	(Russia) RUS	Dmitri Kabutov	16	1	12	1	0	0	4	0
13	FW	(Russia) RUS	Aleksandr Korotayev	15	2	11	1	0	0	4	1
20	FW	(Russia) RUS	Khyzyr Appayev	15	1	12	1	0	0	3	0
7	FW	(Russia) RUS	Sergei Shumilin	14	1	13	1	1	0	0	0
Players who participated only in the RNFL Cup:
13	FW	(Russia) RUS	Vladislav Khrushchak	4	1	0	0	0	0	4	1
Players who completed the season with other clubs:
83	GK	(Russia) RUS	Mikhail Baranovskiy	1	-3	0	0	1	-3	0	0
4	DF	(Russia) RUS	Stepan Ryabokon	3	0	0	0	0	0	3	0
8	MF	(Russia) RUS	Sergei Rashevsky	7	0	6	0	1	0	0	0
21	MF	(Russia) RUS	Vyacheslav Sostin	0	0	0	0	0	0	0	0
28	FW	(Russia) RUS	Vasili Karmazinenko	19	3	18	2	1	1	0	0
18	FW	(Russia) RUS	Roman Smolskiy	0	0	0	0	0	0	0	0

==== Top scorers ====
Player	RNFL	Russian Cup	RNFL Cup	Total
Aleksandr Stavpets	9	0	0	9
Artur Rylov	3	0	0	3
Vasili Karmazinenko	2	1	0	3
Semyon Fomin	2	0	1	3
Aleksandr Korotayev	1	0	1	2
Sergei Shumilin	1	0	0	1
Dmitri Kabutov	1	0	0	1
Khyzyr Appayev	1	0	0	1
Aleksei Pugin	1	0	0	1
Andrei Vasyanovich	1	0	0	1
Sergei Vaganov	1	0	0	1
Ivan Todorović	1	0	0	1
Aleksandr Malygin	1	0	0	1
Ilya Zinin	1	0	0	1
Nikolai Olenikov	1	0	0	1
Dmitri Guz	0	1	0	1
Vladislav Khrushchak	0	0	1	1
Oleg Aleynik	0	0	1	1
Total	27	2	4	33

==== Disciplinary record ====
Player	RNFL			Russian Cup			RNFL Cup			Total		
Player	Yellow card	(yellow card) (red card)	Red card	Yellow card	(yellow card) (red card)	Red card	Yellow card	(yellow card) (red card)	Red card	Yellow card	(yellow card) (red card)	Red card
Aleksandr Malygin	11	0	0	0	0	0	1	0	0	12	0	0
Artur Rylov	6	0	0	0	0	0	0	0	0	6	0	0
Ivan Todorović	6	0	0	0	0	0	0	0	0	6	0	0
Aleksandr Stavpets	5	0	0	0	0	0	0	0	0	5	0	0
Ilya Zinin	5	0	0	0	0	0	0	0	0	5	0	0
Nikolai Olenikov	4	0	0	0	0	0	1	0	0	5	0	0
Oleg Aleynik	3	0	0	1	0	0	1	0	0	5	0	0
Andrei Vasyanovich	4	0	0	0	0	1	0	0	0	4	0	1
Dmitri Guz	4	0	0	0	0	0	0	0	0	4	0	0
Ilya Ionov	3	0	0	1	0	0	0	0	0	4	0	0
Semyon Fomin	3	0	0	0	0	0	1	0	0	4	0	0
Denis Pchelintsev	3	0	0	0	0	0	1	0	0	4	0	0
Khyzyr Appayev	2	0	0	0	0	0	1	0	0	3	0	0
Deviko Khinchagov	1	1	0	1	0	0	0	0	0	2	1	0
Sergei Rashevsky	2	0	0	0	0	0	0	0	0	2	0	0
Aleksandr Korotayev	2	0	0	0	0	0	0	0	0	2	0	0
Vasili Karmazinenko	2	0	0	0	0	0	0	0	0	2	0	0
Sergei Shumilin	1	0	0	0	0	0	0	0	0	1	0	0
Denis Arlashin	1	0	0	0	0	0	0	0	0	1	0	0
Aleksandr Nechayev	1	0	0	0	0	0	0	0	0	1	0	0
Nikita Glushkov	1	0	0	0	0	0	0	0	0	1	0	0
Aleksei Pugin	1	0	0	0	0	0	0	0	0	1	0	0
Sergei Vaganov	1	0	0	0	0	0	0	0	0	1	0	0
Aleksandr Malyshev	0	0	0	0	0	0	1	0	0	1	0	0
Total	72	1	0	3	0	1	7	0	0	82	1	1

=== Team statistics ===
==== Home attendance ====
Date	Round	Attendance	Opposition	Stadium
9 July 2012	Round 1	12,000	Tom Tomsk	Tsentralniy
22 July 2012	Round 3	13,200	Khimki	Tsentralniy
7 August 2012	Round 5	14,500	Ufa	Tsentralniy
17 August 2012	Round 7	10,100	Neftekhimik Nizhnekamsk	Tsentralniy
27 August 2012	Round 9	9,800	Ural Ekaterinburg	Tsentralniy
10 September 2012	Round 11	6,000	Metallurg-Kuzbass Novokuznetsk	Tsentralniy
21 September 2012	Round 13	9,500	Spartak Nalchik	Tsentralniy
8 October 2012	Round 15	8,000	Volgar Astrakhan	Tsentralniy
22 October 2012	Round 17	7,500	Petrotrest Saint Petersburg	Tsentralniy
26 October 2012	Round 18	8,000	Sibir Novosibirsk	Tsentralniy
5 November 2012	Round 20	10,200	Baltika Kaliningrad	Tsentralniy
18 March 2013	Round 24	10,700	Shinnik Yaroslavl	Tsentralniy
1 April 2013	Round 26	9,800	Yenisey Krasnoyarsk	Tsentralniy
16 April 2013	Round 28	8,000	SKA-Energiya Khabarovsk	Tsentralniy
29 April 2013	Round 30	7,500	Torpedo Moscow	Tsentralniy
13 May 2013	Round 32	6,000	Salyut Belgorod	Tsentralniy
Total	150,800			
Average	9,425			

Note: bold type font are the highest attendance in round.

==== General statistics ====
Tournament	Pld	W	D	L	GF	GA	GD	YC	2YC	RC	Pts
RNFL	32	11	8	13	27	26	+1	72	1	0	41/96 (42,7 %)
Russian Cup	1	0	0	1	2	3	−1	3	0	1	0/3 (0%)
RNFL Cup	4	2	1	1	4	2	+2	7	0	0	7/12 (58,3 %)
Total	37	13	9	15	33	31	+2	82	1	1	48/111 (43,2 %)
