= List of Russian football transfers summer 2012 =

This is a list of Russian football transfers in the summer transfer window 2012 by club. Only clubs of the 2012–13 Russian Premier League are included.

== Russian Premier League 2012–13 ==
=== Alania Vladikavkaz ===
In: Note: Flags indicate national team as defined under FIFA eligibility rules; some limited exceptions apply. Players may hold more than one non-FIFA nationality.

| No. | Pos. | Nation | Player |
|---|---|---|---|
| 2 | DF | RUS | Vladimir Khozin (from Torpedo Moscow) |
| 18 | DF | LTU | Deividas Šemberas (from CSKA Moscow) |
| 19 | FW | RUS | Dmitri Golubov (from Dynamo Bryansk) |
| 21 | DF | BRA | Carlos Alexandre Cardoso (from (Romania) Pandurii Târgu Jiu) |
| 24 | MF | RUS | Roland Gigolayev (from Alania-D Vladikavkaz, August 2012) |
| 25 | DF | ROU | Ioan Mera (from (Romania) Politehnica Timișoara, previously on loan to (Romania) Unirea Urziceni) |
| 30 | MF | GEO | Shota Grigalashvili (from (Georgia (country)) Dila Gori) |
| 37 | MF | RUS | Batraz Khadartsev (from CSKA Moscow) |
| 44 | DF | RUS | Marat Butuyev (from FAYUR Beslan) |
| 46 | DF | RUS | Albert Tskhovrebov (from Alania-D Vladikavkaz) |
| 49 | FW | BRA | Diego Maurício (from (Brazil) Flamengo) |
| 50 | FW | RUS | Chermen Tamayev |
| 55 | DF | RUS | Georgi Burayev |
| 71 | FW | RUS | Taymuraz Toboyev |
| 75 | DF | RUS | Oleg Tolmasov |
| 77 | DF | RUS | Giya Yeloshvili |
| 78 | DF | RUS | Dmitry Griban (from Alania-D Vladikavkaz) |
| 84 | MF | BRA | Rudnei da Rosa (from (Brazil) Cruzeiro) |
| 90 | GK | RUS | Omar Tsopanov (from Alania-D Vladikavkaz) |
| 91 | DF | RUS | Alan Tatayev |
| 93 | DF | RUS | Yaroslav Zamchalov |
| 95 | DF | RUS | Edik Pliyev |
| 97 | DF | RUS | Georgy Dzhagmaidze |
| 98 | DF | RUS | Igor Khaymanov (from Alania-D Vladikavkaz) |
| 99 | DF | RUS | Tamerlan Kachmazov |
| — | MF | RUS | Aleksandr Gagloyev (end of loan to Gazovik Orenburg) |

Out: Note: Flags indicate national team as defined under FIFA eligibility rules; some limited exceptions apply. Players may hold more than one non-FIFA nationality.

| No. | Pos. | Nation | Player |
|---|---|---|---|
| 3 | DF | RUS | Soslan Takazov (to Alania-D Vladikavkaz) |
| 7 | DF | RUS | Roland Gigolayev (to Alania-D Vladikavkaz, not later than July 2012) |
| 15 | MF | RUS | Aslan Mashukov (to Volgar Astrakhan) |
| 18 | MF | RUS | Dzhambulad Bazayev (retired) |
| 32 | FW | ESA | Rodolfo Zelaya (end of loan from (El Salvador) Alianza) |
| 63 | MF | RUS | Kazbek Makiyev |
| 75 | MF | UZB | Marat Bikmaev (to (Kazakhstan) Aktobe) |
| 77 | FW | NZL | Kosta Barbarouses (on loan to (Greece) Panathinaikos) |

=== Amkar Perm ===
In: Note: Flags indicate national team as defined under FIFA eligibility rules; some limited exceptions apply. Players may hold more than one non-FIFA nationality.

| No. | Pos. | Nation | Player |
|---|---|---|---|
| 2 | FW | GRE | Nikolaos Karelis (from (Greece) Ergotelis) |
| 9 | MF | RUS | Aleksei Rebko (from Tom Tomsk) |
| 11 | FW | RUS | Pavel Ignatovich (from Dynamo Bryansk) |
| 27 | MF | RUS | Vadim Gagloyev (from Nizhny Novgorod) |
| 63 | FW | RUS | Stanislav Matyash (from Zenit Saint Petersburg, previously on loan to Volgar Astrakhan) |
| 83 | FW | MDA | Igor Picuşceac (from Krasnodar) |
| — | MF | RUS | Mikhail Belov (from Lokomotiv Liski) |
| — | MF | RUS | Andrei Sekretov (end of loan to Gazovik Orenburg) |

Out: Note: Flags indicate national team as defined under FIFA eligibility rules; some limited exceptions apply. Players may hold more than one non-FIFA nationality.

| No. | Pos. | Nation | Player |
|---|---|---|---|
| 10 | MF | RUS | Andrei Topchu (released) |
| 11 | FW | MNE | Radomir Đalović (to (Iran) Sepahan Isfahan) |
| 18 | MF | RUS | Nikita Burmistrov (to Anzhi Makhachkala) |
| 20 | DF | RUS | Artyom Molodtsov (to Torpedo Moscow) |
| 51 | GK | RUS | Igor Stepanov (to Ufa) |
| 77 | DF | GEO | Zourab Tsiskaridze (released) |
| 83 | DF | RUS | Georgi Dzhioyev (released) |

=== Anzhi Makhachkala ===
In: Note: Flags indicate national team as defined under FIFA eligibility rules; some limited exceptions apply. Players may hold more than one non-FIFA nationality.

| No. | Pos. | Nation | Player |
|---|---|---|---|
| 19 | FW | CIV | Lacina Traoré (from Kuban Krasnodar) |
| 25 | FW | RUS | Fyodor Smolov (on loan from Dynamo Moscow) |
| 28 | FW | RUS | Serder Serderov (from CSKA Moscow) |
| 37 | DF | BRA | Ewerton Almeida (from (Brazil) Corinthians Alagoano, previously on loan to (Portugal) Braga) |
| 81 | MF | RUS | Nikita Burmistrov (from Amkar Perm) |
| 85 | MF | FRA | Lassana Diarra (from (Spain) Real Madrid) |

Out: Note: Flags indicate national team as defined under FIFA eligibility rules; some limited exceptions apply. Players may hold more than one non-FIFA nationality.

| No. | Pos. | Nation | Player |
|---|---|---|---|
| 4 | MF | RUS | Aleksei Igonin (released) |
| 17 | FW | CZE | Jan Holenda (to Rostov) |
| 18 | DF | CMR | Benoît Angbwa (to Rostov) |
| 24 | MF | RUS | Aleksei Ivanov (released) |
| 77 | GK | RUS | Aleksandr Makarov (to Sibir Novosibirsk) |
| 89 | FW | RUS | Aleksandr Prudnikov (end of loan from Spartak Moscow) |
| 90 | MF | RUS | Makhach Gadzhiyev (released) |
| — | FW | RUS | Ilya Kukharchuk (to Ural Sverdlovsk Oblast, previously on loan) |
| — | MF | GEO | Irakli Klimiashvili (to (Georgia (country)) Dila Gori, previously on loan to (Uzbekistan) Pakhtakor Tashkent) |

=== CSKA Moscow ===
In: Note: Flags indicate national team as defined under FIFA eligibility rules; some limited exceptions apply. Players may hold more than one non-FIFA nationality.

| No. | Pos. | Nation | Player |
|---|---|---|---|
| 13 | DF | BRA | Mário Fernandes (from (Brazil) Grêmio) |
| 20 | MF | SWE | Rasmus Elm (from (Netherlands) AZ) |

Out: Note: Flags indicate national team as defined under FIFA eligibility rules; some limited exceptions apply. Players may hold more than one non-FIFA nationality.

| No. | Pos. | Nation | Player |
|---|---|---|---|
| 2 | DF | LTU | Deividas Šemberas (to Alania Vladikavkaz) |
| 22 | MF | RUS | Evgeni Aldonin (on loan to Mordovia Saransk) |
| 53 | DF | RUS | Andrei Semyonov (on loan to Lokomotiv-2 Moscow) |
| 55 | MF | RUS | Batraz Khadartsev (to Alania Vladikavkaz) |
| 61 | FW | RUS | Serder Serderov (to Anzhi Makhachkala) |
| 99 | MF | RUS | Yevgeni Kobzar (on loan to Khimki) |
| — | GK | RUS | Artur Nigmatullin (on loan to Volga Nizhny Novgorod, previously on loan to Khimki) |
| — | DF | SRB | Uroš Ćosić (on loan to (Italy) Pescara, previously on loan to (Serbia) Red Star Belgrade) |
| — | DF | RUS | Aleksei Nikitin (to Yenisey Krasnoyarsk, previously on loan) |
| — | DF | RUS | Andrei Vasyanovich (on loan to Rotor Volgograd, previously on loan to Dynamo Bryansk) |
| — | MF | CZE | Luboš Kalouda (to (Czech Republic) Dukla Prague, previously on loan to (Ukraine) Oleksandriya) |
| — | MF | RUS | Aleksandr Vasilyev (on loan to Ufa, previously on loan to Yenisey Krasnoyarsk) |
| — | MF | RUS | Aleksandr Stolyarenko (on loan to Sokol Saratov, previously on loan to Torpedo Moscow) |
| — | FW | NIG | Moussa Maâzou (to (Tunisia) Étoile du Sahel, previously on loan to (France) Le Mans) |

=== Dynamo Moscow ===
In: Note: Flags indicate national team as defined under FIFA eligibility rules; some limited exceptions apply. Players may hold more than one non-FIFA nationality.

| No. | Pos. | Nation | Player |
|---|---|---|---|
| 3 | DF | CRO | Gordon Schildenfeld (from (Germany) Eintracht Frankfurt) |
| 17 | MF | RUS | Alan Gatagov (end of loan to Tom Tomsk) |
| 25 | DF | RUS | Denis Kolodin (end of loan to Rostov) |
| 28 | MF | NED | Otman Bakkal (from (Netherlands) PSV Eindhoven, previously on loan to (Netherlands) Feyenoord) |
| 44 | DF | RUS | Nikita Chicherin (end of loan to Volga Nizhny Novgorod) |
| 49 | DF | RUS | Grigory Morozov |
| 68 | DF | RUS | Antonio Moreyes (from (Spain) Colmenar Viejo) |
| — | MF | ROU | Adrian Ropotan (end of loan to Tom Tomsk) |

Out: Note: Flags indicate national team as defined under FIFA eligibility rules; some limited exceptions apply. Players may hold more than one non-FIFA nationality.

| No. | Pos. | Nation | Player |
|---|---|---|---|
| 2 | DF | RUS | Vladimir Kisenkov (on loan to Rostov) |
| 5 | DF | MDA | Alexandru Epureanu (on loan to Krylia Sovetov Samara) |
| 11 | FW | UKR | Andriy Voronin (on loan to (Germany) Fortuna Düsseldorf) |
| 19 | MF | RUS | Aleksandr Samedov (to Lokomotiv Moscow) |
| 27 | FW | RUS | Fyodor Smolov (on loan to Anzhi Makhachkala) |
| 45 | MF | UKR | Borys Tashchy (on loan to (Ukraine) Chornomorets Odesa) |
| 56 | MF | RUS | Vladimir Sobolev (to Khimki) |
| 77 | FW | RUS | Irakli Logua (to Sibir Novosibirsk) |
| — | DF | FIN | Boris Rotenberg (on loan to (Cyprus) Olympiakos Nicosia, previously on loan to Kuban Krasnodar) |
| — | MF | CRO | Tomislav Dujmović (on loan to Mordovia Saransk, previously on loan to (Spain) Real Zaragoza) |
| — | MF | RUS | Yuri Kirillov (to Ufa, previously on loan to Ural Sverdlovsk Oblast) |

=== FC Krasnodar ===
In: Note: Flags indicate national team as defined under FIFA eligibility rules; some limited exceptions apply. Players may hold more than one non-FIFA nationality.

| No. | Pos. | Nation | Player |
|---|---|---|---|
| 6 | DF | RUS | Ruslan Nakhushev (from Lokomotiv Moscow, previously on loan to (Russia) Tom Tomsk) |
| 7 | MF | RUS | Vladislav Ignatyev (from Lokomotiv Moscow) |
| 8 | MF | BLR | Syarhey Kislyak (on loan from Rubin Kazan) |
| 11 | FW | SEN | Pape Moussa Konaté (from (Israel) Maccabi Tel Aviv) |
| 14 | FW | BRA | Wánderson do Carmo (on loan from (Sweden) GAIS) |
| 21 | FW | RUS | Khyzyr Appayev (from Krylia Sovetov Samara) |
| 28 | DF | RUS | Igor Smolnikov (from Rostov) |
| 77 | MF | HUN | Vladimir Koman (from (France) AS Monaco) |
| 88 | GK | RUS | Andrei Sinitsyn (from Yenisey Krasnoyarsk) |

Out: Note: Flags indicate national team as defined under FIFA eligibility rules; some limited exceptions apply. Players may hold more than one non-FIFA nationality.

| No. | Pos. | Nation | Player |
|---|---|---|---|
| 7 | MF | GEO | Otar Martsvaladze (released) |
| 9 | FW | MDA | Igor Picuşceac (to Amkar Perm) |
| 14 | MF | RUS | Vladimir Tatarchuk (to Spartak Nalchik) |
| 23 | MF | RUS | Andrei Mikheyev (to Ufa) |
| 24 | MF | BLR | Alyaksandr Kulchy (to (Kazakhstan) Irtysh Pavlodar) |
| 31 | MF | MDA | Valeriu Ciupercă (on loan to Yenisey Krasnoyarsk) |
| 34 | MF | RUS | Andrei Gorbanets (to Tom Tomsk, previously on loan to Mordovia Saransk) |
| — | GK | RUS | Denis Pchelintsev (to Rotor Volgograd, previously on loan to (Russia) Baltika Kaliningrad) |
| — | DF | RUS | Yegor Tarakanov (to Volga Nizhny Novgorod, previously on loan to (Russia) Nizhny Novgorod) |
| — | DF | RUS | Sergei Tsukanov (to Salyut Belgorod, previously on loan to Torpedo Vladimir) |
| — | MF | RUS | Azim Fatullayev (to Yenisey Krasnoyarsk, previously on loan) |

=== Krylia Sovetov Samara ===
In: Note: Flags indicate national team as defined under FIFA eligibility rules; some limited exceptions apply. Players may hold more than one non-FIFA nationality.

| No. | Pos. | Nation | Player |
|---|---|---|---|
| 10 | MF | RUS | Pyotr Nemov (from Rubin Kazan) |
| 23 | MF | RUS | Yevgeni Balyaikin (from Rubin Kazan) |
| 32 | MF | RUS | Aleksandr Yeliseyev (end of loan to Shinnik Yaroslavl) |
| 58 | DF | RUS | Ayzer Abbasov (from Zenit Saint Petersburg) |
| 63 | FW | RUS | Artyom Delkin (from Torpedo Vladimir) |
| 79 | FW | RUS | Artyom Lobov (from Akademiya Tolyatti) |
| 80 | FW | RUS | Magomed Ubaydulayev |
| — | DF | MDA | Alexandru Epureanu (on loan from Dynamo Moscow) |
| — | DF | BRA | Bruno Martins Teles (from (Portugal) Vitória) |
| — | FW | PAR | Luis Nery Caballero (from (Paraguay) Olimpia) |
| — | FW | PAR | Pablo Zeballos (from (Paraguay) Olimpia) |

Out: Note: Flags indicate national team as defined under FIFA eligibility rules; some limited exceptions apply. Players may hold more than one non-FIFA nationality.

| No. | Pos. | Nation | Player |
|---|---|---|---|
| 3 | DF | BLR | Dmitry Molosh (released) |
| 7 | MF | RUS | Anton Bobyor (to Mordovia Saransk) |
| 13 | MF | BLR | Alexander Hleb (to (Belarus) BATE Borisov) |
| 17 | FW | UKR | Volodymyr Priyomov (released) |
| 20 | MF | CAN | Joseph Di Chiara (released) |
| 90 | FW | RUS | Khyzyr Appayev (to Krasnodar) |
| 91 | MF | RUS | Pavel Yakovlev (end of loan from Spartak Moscow) |
| 99 | FW | COD | Joël Tshibamba (end of loan from (Greece) AEL) |
| — | MF | RUS | Basel Abdoulfattakh (to Yenisey Krasnoyarsk, previously on loan) |

=== Kuban Krasnodar ===
In: Note: Flags indicate national team as defined under FIFA eligibility rules; some limited exceptions apply. Players may hold more than one non-FIFA nationality.

| No. | Pos. | Nation | Player |
|---|---|---|---|
| 5 | DF | ESP | Ángel Dealbert (from (Spain) Valencia) |
| 14 | FW | NGR | Abdulwaheed Afolabi (from (Ukraine) Tavriya Simferopol) |
| 20 | FW | ROU | Daniel Niculae (from (France) AS Monaco, previously on loan to (France) Nancy) |
| 24 | MF | ARM | Aras Özbiliz (from (Netherlands) Ajax) |
| 28 | FW | SEN | Ibrahima Baldé (from (Spain) Osasuna) |
| 71 | MF | BUL | Ivelin Popov (from (Turkey) Gaziantepspor) |

Out: Note: Flags indicate national team as defined under FIFA eligibility rules; some limited exceptions apply. Players may hold more than one non-FIFA nationality.

| No. | Pos. | Nation | Player |
|---|---|---|---|
| 4 | DF | FIN | Boris Rotenberg (to (Cyprus) Olympiakos Nicosia on loan from Dynamo Moscow) |
| 19 | FW | RUS | Anton Sekret (on loan to Volgar Astrakhan) |
| 20 | FW | CIV | Lacina Traoré (to Anzhi Makhachkala) |
| 37 | MF | RUS | Mikhail Komkov (on loan to Khimki) |
| — | DF | RUS | Sergei Bendz (on loan to Tom Tomsk, previously on loan to Volga Nizhny Novgorod) |
| — | DF | ANG | Francisco Zuela (to (Cyprus) APOEL, previously on loan to (Greece) Atromitos) |

=== Lokomotiv Moscow ===
In: Note: Flags indicate national team as defined under FIFA eligibility rules; some limited exceptions apply. Players may hold more than one non-FIFA nationality.

| No. | Pos. | Nation | Player |
|---|---|---|---|
| 3 | DF | SUI | Reto Ziegler (on loan from (Italy) Juventus, previously on loan to (Turkey) Fenerbahçe) |
| 14 | DF | CRO | Vedran Ćorluka (from (England) Tottenham Hotspur, previously on loan to (Germany) Bayer 04 Leverkusen) |
| 19 | MF | RUS | Aleksandr Samedov (from Dynamo Moscow) |
| 22 | GK | CRO | Dario Krešić (from (Greece) PAOK) |
| 33 | FW | SEN | Dame N'Doye (from (Denmark) Copenhagen) |
| 45 | FW | RUS | Aleksandr Minchenkov (end of loan to Mordovia Saransk) |

Out: Note: Flags indicate national team as defined under FIFA eligibility rules; some limited exceptions apply. Players may hold more than one non-FIFA nationality.

| No. | Pos. | Nation | Player |
|---|---|---|---|
| 9 | MF | BIH | Senijad Ibričić (on loan to (Turkey) Gaziantepspor) |
| 16 | GK | BLR | Anton Amelchenko (on loan to Terek Grozny) |
| 18 | MF | RUS | Vladislav Ignatyev (to Krasnodar) |
| 22 | DF | POR | Manuel da Costa (on loan to (Portugal) Nacional) |
| 29 | DF | RUS | Igor Golban (on loan to (Czech Republic) Sigma Olomouc) |
| 32 | FW | RUS | Mikhail Petrusyov (on loan to Dnepr Smolensk) |
| 44 | MF | RUS | Aleksei Gorshkov (to Rus Saint Petersburg) |
| 55 | DF | RUS | Renat Yanbayev (on loan to Zenit Saint Petersburg) |
| 64 | MF | RUS | Nikita Lapin (to Zvezda Ryazan) |
| 74 | FW | RUS | Maksim Barsov (to Volga Ulyanovsk) |
| 77 | MF | MDA | Stanislav Ivanov (to (Moldova) Sheriff Tiraspol) |
| 82 | MF | RUS | Igor Mendelev |
| 89 | DF | RUS | Nikita Samokhvalov |
| — | DF | RUS | Andrei Ivanov (on loan to Rostov, previously on loan to Tom Tomsk) |
| — | DF | RUS | Ruslan Nakhushev (to Krasnodar, previously on loan to Tom Tomsk) |
| — | MF | RUS | Semyon Fomin (on loan to Rotor Volgograd, previously on loan to (Russia) Spartak Nalchik) |
| — | FW | ARM | Artur Sarkisov (on loan to Volga Nizhny Novgorod, previously on loan to Shinnik Yaroslavl) |

=== Mordovia Saransk ===
In: Note: Flags indicate national team as defined under FIFA eligibility rules; some limited exceptions apply. Players may hold more than one non-FIFA nationality.

| No. | Pos. | Nation | Player |
|---|---|---|---|
| 1 | GK | RUS | Dmitry Abakumov (from KAMAZ Naberezhnye Chelny) |
| 5 | MF | RUS | Roman Kontsedalov (on loan from Spartak Nalchik) |
| 7 | MF | RUS | Anton Bobyor (from Krylia Sovetov Samara) |
| 20 | MF | CRO | Tomislav Dujmović (on loan from Dynamo Moscow, previously on loan to (Spain) Real Zaragoza) |
| 22 | MF | RUS | Evgeni Aldonin (on loan from CSKA Moscow) |
| — | FW | SLO | Dalibor Volaš (from (Moldova) Sheriff Tiraspol, previously on loan to (Slovenia) Maribor) |

Out: Note: Flags indicate national team as defined under FIFA eligibility rules; some limited exceptions apply. Players may hold more than one non-FIFA nationality.

| No. | Pos. | Nation | Player |
|---|---|---|---|
| 14 | MF | CHI | Gerson Acevedo (to Ural Sverdlovsk Oblast) |
| 16 | GK | RUS | Aleksandr Agapov (to SKA-Energiya Khabarovsk) |
| 32 | MF | RUS | Andrei Gorbanets (to Tom Tomsk, previously on loan from (Russia) Krasnodar) |
| 45 | FW | RUS | Aleksandr Minchenkov (end of loan from Lokomotiv Moscow) |
| 77 | FW | RUS | Anatoli Gerk (to Ural Sverdlovsk Oblast) |

=== FC Rostov ===
In: Note: Flags indicate national team as defined under FIFA eligibility rules; some limited exceptions apply. Players may hold more than one non-FIFA nationality.

| No. | Pos. | Nation | Player |
|---|---|---|---|
| 8 | MF | RUS | Dmitri Malyaka (from Tom Tomsk) |
| 9 | FW | RUS | Roman Adamov (from Rubin Kazan, previously on loan) |
| 11 | FW | CZE | Jan Holenda (from Anzhi Makhachkala) |
| 15 | DF | CMR | Benoît Angbwa (from Anzhi Makhachkala) |
| 17 | MF | RUS | Aleksandr Sheshukov (from Spartak Moscow) |
| 18 | DF | RUS | Vladimir Kisenkov (on loan from Dynamo Moscow) |
| 20 | MF | RUS | Sergey Belousov (from Torpedo Moscow) |
| 21 | MF | ENG | David Bentley (on loan from (England) Tottenham Hotspur) |
| 22 | DF | RUS | Andrei Ivanov (on loan from Lokomotiv Moscow, previously on loan to Tom Tomsk) |
| 23 | MF | RUS | Igor Kireyev (from Spartak Moscow) |
| 24 | FW | FRA | Florent Sinama Pongolle (from (Portugal) Sporting, previously on loan to (France) Saint-Étienne) |
| 25 | GK | RUS | Nikolai Zabolotny (on loan from Spartak Moscow) |
| 33 | DF | RUS | Inal Getigezhev (from Volga Nizhny Novgorod) |
| 43 | GK | RUS | Konstantin Bosikov |
| 55 | DF | RSA | Siyanda Xulu (from (South Africa) Mamelodi Sundowns) |
| 87 | FW | USA | Eugene Starikov (on loan from Zenit Saint Petersburg) |

Out: Note: Flags indicate national team as defined under FIFA eligibility rules; some limited exceptions apply. Players may hold more than one non-FIFA nationality.

| No. | Pos. | Nation | Player |
|---|---|---|---|
| 6 | MF | ARG | Oscar Ahumada (to (Argentina) All Boys) |
| 16 | DF | EST | Dmitri Kruglov (contract expired) |
| 18 | FW | CZE | Michal Papadopulos (to (Poland) Zagłębie Lubin) |
| 19 | FW | ARG | Héctor Bracamonte (to (Argentina) Rosario Central) |
| 24 | DF | RUS | Denis Kolodin (end of loan from Dynamo Moscow) |
| 28 | MF | RUS | Igor Smolnikov (to Krasnodar) |
| 72 | DF | RUS | Valentin Filatov (to Khimki) |
| 92 | MF | RUS | Roman Yemelyanov (to (Ukraine) Illichivets Mariupol on loan from (Ukraine) Shakhtar Donetsk) |
| 97 | GK | RUS | Sergei Pesyakov (end of loan from Spartak Moscow) |

=== Rubin Kazan ===
In: Note: Flags indicate national team as defined under FIFA eligibility rules; some limited exceptions apply. Players may hold more than one non-FIFA nationality.

| No. | Pos. | Nation | Player |
|---|---|---|---|
| 6 | MF | ESP | Pablo Orbaiz (from (Spain) Athletic Bilbao, previously on loan to (Greece) Olympiacos) |
| 16 | MF | MDA | Mihail Plătică (from (Moldova) Academia UTM) |
| 25 | DF | ESP | Iván Marcano (from (Spain) Villarreal) |
| 35 | MF | RUS | Ivan Temnikov (from Dynamo Bryansk) |
| 55 | MF | TUR | Gökhan Töre (from (Germany) Hamburger SV) |
| 99 | FW | VEN | Salomón Rondón (from (Spain) Málaga) |

Out: Note: Flags indicate national team as defined under FIFA eligibility rules; some limited exceptions apply. Players may hold more than one non-FIFA nationality.

| No. | Pos. | Nation | Player |
|---|---|---|---|
| 9 | MF | RUS | Pyotr Nemov (to Krylia Sovetov Samara) |
| 15 | DF | BLR | Syarhey Kislyak (on loan to Krasnodar) |
| 18 | FW | PAR | Nelson Haedo Valdez (on loan to (Spain) Valencia) |
| 30 | MF | ESP | Jonatan Valle (to (Spain) Recreativo de Huelva) |
| 42 | DF | RUS | Marat Doyati (to Shinnik Yaroslavl) |
| 63 | MF | RUS | Alisher Dzhalilov (to Neftekhimik Nizhnekamsk) |
| 67 | DF | GEO | Solomon Kvirkvelia (to Neftekhimik Nizhnekamsk) |
| 77 | MF | RUS | Nikita Bocharov (on loan to Neftekhimik Nizhnekamsk) |
| 84 | DF | RUS | Iskandar Dzhalilov (to Neftekhimik Nizhnekamsk) |
| 92 | FW | TKM | Wahyt Orazsähedow (to Neftekhimik Nizhnekamsk) |
| 97 | FW | RUS | Georgi Nurov (to Neftekhimik Nizhnekamsk) |
| — | GK | RUS | Yuri Nesterenko (to Neftekhimik Nizhnekamsk, previously on loan to Rubin-2 Kazan) |
| — | DF | RUS | Aleksandr Kulikov (on loan to Neftekhimik Nizhnekamsk, previously on loan to Spartak Nalchik) |
| — | DF | RUS | Anton Piskunov (to Neftekhimik Nizhnekamsk, previously on loan to KAMAZ Naberezhnye Chelny) |
| — | DF | RUS | Vitali Ustinov (to Neftekhimik Nizhnekamsk, previously on loan) |
| — | DF | RUS | Maksim Zhestokov (to Khimki, previously on loan to KAMAZ Naberezhnye Chelny) |
| — | MF | RUS | Yevgeni Balyaikin (to Krylia Sovetov Samara, previously on loan to (Russia) Tom Tomsk) |
| — | MF | UZB | Vagiz Galiullin (to Neftekhimik Nizhnekamsk, previously on loan to (Russia) Sibir Novosibirsk) |
| — | MF | RUS | Aleksei Kotlyarov (to Neftekhimik Nizhnekamsk, previously on loan) |
| — | MF | RUS | Ruslan Makhmutov (to Neftekhimik Nizhnekamsk, previously on loan) |
| — | MF | RUS | Ilsur Samigullin (to Neftekhimik Nizhnekamsk, previously on loan) |
| — | FW | RUS | Roman Adamov (to Rostov, previously on loan) |
| — | FW | RUS | Davron Mirzaev (to Neftekhimik Nizhnekamsk, previously on loan) |
| — | FW | RUS | Igor Portnyagin (on loan to Neftekhimik Nizhnekamsk, previously on loan to Tom Tomsk) |

=== Spartak Moscow ===
In: Note: Flags indicate national team as defined under FIFA eligibility rules; some limited exceptions apply. Players may hold more than one non-FIFA nationality.

| No. | Pos. | Nation | Player |
|---|---|---|---|
| 2 | DF | ARG | Juan Manuel Insaurralde (from (Argentina) Boca Juniors) |
| 4 | MF | RUS | Emin Mahmudov (end of loan to Tom Tomsk) |
| 14 | MF | RUS | Pavel Yakovlev (end of loan to Krylia Sovetov Samara) |
| 18 | DF | RUS | Ilya Kutepov (from Akademiya Tolyatti) |
| 19 | MF | ESP | José Manuel Jurado (on loan from (Germany) Schalke 04) |
| 21 | MF | SWE | Kim Källström (from (France) Olympique Lyonnais) |
| 30 | GK | RUS | Sergei Pesyakov (end of loan to Rostov) |
| 37 | MF | BRA | Rômulo (from (Brazil) Vasco da Gama) |
| 57 | FW | RUS | Vyacheslav Krotov (from Volgar Astrakhan) |
| — | FW | RUS | Aleksandr Prudnikov (end of loan to Anzhi Makhachkala) |

Out: Note: Flags indicate national team as defined under FIFA eligibility rules; some limited exceptions apply. Players may hold more than one non-FIFA nationality.

| No. | Pos. | Nation | Player |
|---|---|---|---|
| 1 | GK | RUS | Nikolai Zabolotny (on loan to Rostov) |
| 3 | DF | ESP | Sergio Rodríguez García (to (Spain) Rayo Vallecano) |
| 5 | MF | RUS | Aleksandr Sheshukov (to Rostov) |
| 13 | DF | RUS | Fyodor Kudryashov (to Terek Grozny) |
| 19 | DF | ARG | Marcos Rojo (to (Portugal) Sporting) |
| 22 | FW | RUS | Aleksandr Kozlov (on loan to Khimki) |
| 39 | MF | RUS | Igor Kireyev (to Rostov) |
| 44 | DF | RUS | Anton Khodyrev (on loan to Sibir Novosibirsk) |

=== Terek Grozny ===
In: Note: Flags indicate national team as defined under FIFA eligibility rules; some limited exceptions apply. Players may hold more than one non-FIFA nationality.

| No. | Pos. | Nation | Player |
|---|---|---|---|
| 9 | FW | BRA | Aílton (from (Cyprus) APOEL) |
| 11 | FW | RUS | Magomed Mitrishev (from Spartak Nalchik) |
| 80 | FW | CHA | Ezechiel N'Douassel (from (Tunisia) Club Africain) |
| 85 | GK | BLR | Anton Amelchenko (on loan from Lokomotiv Moscow) |
| 87 | DF | RUS | Fyodor Kudryashov (from Spartak Moscow) |
| 89 | MF | POL | Maciej Makuszewski (from (Poland) Jagiellonia Białystok) |

Out: Note: Flags indicate national team as defined under FIFA eligibility rules; some limited exceptions apply. Players may hold more than one non-FIFA nationality.

| No. | Pos. | Nation | Player |
|---|---|---|---|
| 4 | DF | ISR | Ze'ev Haimovich (to (Israel) Hapoel Tel Aviv) |
| 9 | MF | CMR | Guy Stephane Essame (released) |
| 11 | FW | RUS | Shamil Asildarov (to Volga Nizhny Novgorod) |
| 14 | DF | BFA | Herve Xavier Zengue (released) |
| 17 | FW | ZIM | Musawengosi Mguni (released) |
| 22 | MF | GEO | Levani Gvazava (to Khimki) |
| 88 | GK | MDA | Ştefan Sicaci (to Salyut Belgorod) |
| — | DF | RUS | Ismail Ediyev (on loan to Chernomorets Novorossiysk, previously on loan to Fakel Voronezh) |

=== Volga Nizhny Novgorod ===
In: Note: Flags indicate national team as defined under FIFA eligibility rules; some limited exceptions apply. Players may hold more than one non-FIFA nationality.

| No. | Pos. | Nation | Player |
|---|---|---|---|
| 1 | GK | RUS | Artur Nigmatullin (on loan from CSKA Moscow, previously on loan to Khimki) |
| 10 | MF | RUS | Sergei Vaganov (from Nizhny Novgorod, June 2012) |
| 11 | FW | RUS | Shamil Asildarov (from Terek Grozny) |
| 14 | FW | ARM | Artur Sarkisov (on loan from Lokomotiv Moscow, previously on loan to Shinnik Yaroslavl) |
| 27 | FW | RUS | Aleksei Sapogov (from Gornyak Uchaly) |
| 33 | DF | RUS | Nikolai Zaytsev (from Gazovik Orenburg) |
| — | DF | RUS | Dmitri Aydov (from Nizhny Novgorod) |
| — | DF | GEO | Giorgi Navalovski (end of loan to Khimki) |
| — | DF | RUS | Yegor Tarakanov (from Krasnodar, previously on loan to Nizhny Novgorod) |
| — | MF | RUS | Maksim Burchenko (end of loan to Shinnik Yaroslavl) |
| — | MF | RUS | Dmitri Kudryashov (from Nizhny Novgorod) |
| — | MF | RUS | Dmitri Polyanin (end of loan to Nizhny Novgorod) |
| — | FW | CRO | Matija Dvorneković (from Nizhny Novgorod) |
| — | FW | RUS | Aleksandr Salugin (end of loan to Nizhny Novgorod) |

Out: Note: Flags indicate national team as defined under FIFA eligibility rules; some limited exceptions apply. Players may hold more than one non-FIFA nationality.

| No. | Pos. | Nation | Player |
|---|---|---|---|
| 1 | GK | RUS | Vitali Astakhov (to Tom Tomsk) |
| 4 | DF | RUS | Nikita Chicherin (end of loan from Dynamo Moscow) |
| 10 | MF | RUS | Sergei Vaganov (on loan to Rotor Volgograd, August 2012) |
| 14 | MF | RUS | Aleksei Pomerko (to Khimki) |
| 26 | DF | RUS | Sergei Bendz (to Tom Tomsk on loan from Kuban Krasnodar) |
| 32 | MF | RUS | Aleksandr Budanov (contract expired) |
| 33 | DF | RUS | Inal Getigezhev (to Rostov) |
| — | MF | RUS | Maksim Zyuzin (to SKA-Energiya Khabarovsk, previously on loan to Sibir Novosibirsk) |

=== Zenit Saint Petersburg ===
In: Note: Flags indicate national team as defined under FIFA eligibility rules; some limited exceptions apply. Players may hold more than one non-FIFA nationality.

| No. | Pos. | Nation | Player |
|---|---|---|---|
| 28 | DF | DEN | Michael Lumb (end of loan to (Germany) SC Freiburg, not later than June 2012) |
| 28 | MF | BEL | Axel Witsel (from (Portugal) Benfica) |
| 29 | FW | BRA | Hulk (from (Portugal) Porto) |
| 50 | DF | RUS | Igor Cheminava (end of loan to Sibir Novosibirsk) |
| 55 | DF | RUS | Renat Yanbayev (on loan from Lokomotiv Moscow) |
| 77 | FW | MNE | Luka Đorđević (end of loan to (Montenegro) Mogren) |

Out: Note: Flags indicate national team as defined under FIFA eligibility rules; some limited exceptions apply. Players may hold more than one non-FIFA nationality.

| No. | Pos. | Nation | Player |
|---|---|---|---|
| 17 | MF | ITA | Alessandro Rosina (to (Italy) Siena) |
| 23 | MF | HUN | Szabolcs Huszti (to (Germany) Hannover 96) |
| 28 | DF | DEN | Michael Lumb (September 2012) |
| 29 | FW | RUS | Andrei Arshavin (end of loan from (England) Arsenal) |
| 72 | MF | RUS | Ayzer Abbasov (to Krylia Sovetov Samara) |
| 82 | GK | RUS | Daniil Sizko (to Rus Saint Petersburg) |
| — | FW | RUS | Stanislav Matyash (to Amkar Perm, previously on loan to Volgar Astrakhan) |
| — | FW | USA | Eugene Starikov (on loan to Rostov) |
