= Bolshoye Murashkino =

Bolshoye Murashkino (Russian: Большое Мурашкино) is the name of several inhabited localities in Russia.

Urban localities

- Bolshoye Murashkino, Nizhny Novgorod Oblast, a work settlement in Bolshemurashkinsky District of Nizhny Novgorod Oblast

Rural localities

- Bolshoye Murashkino, Arkhangelsk Oblast, a village in Cherevkovsky Selsoviet of Krasnoborsky District of Arkhangelsk Oblast
