= Bolshemurashkinsky District =

Bolshemurashkinsky District Большемурашкинский район (Russian)
- District
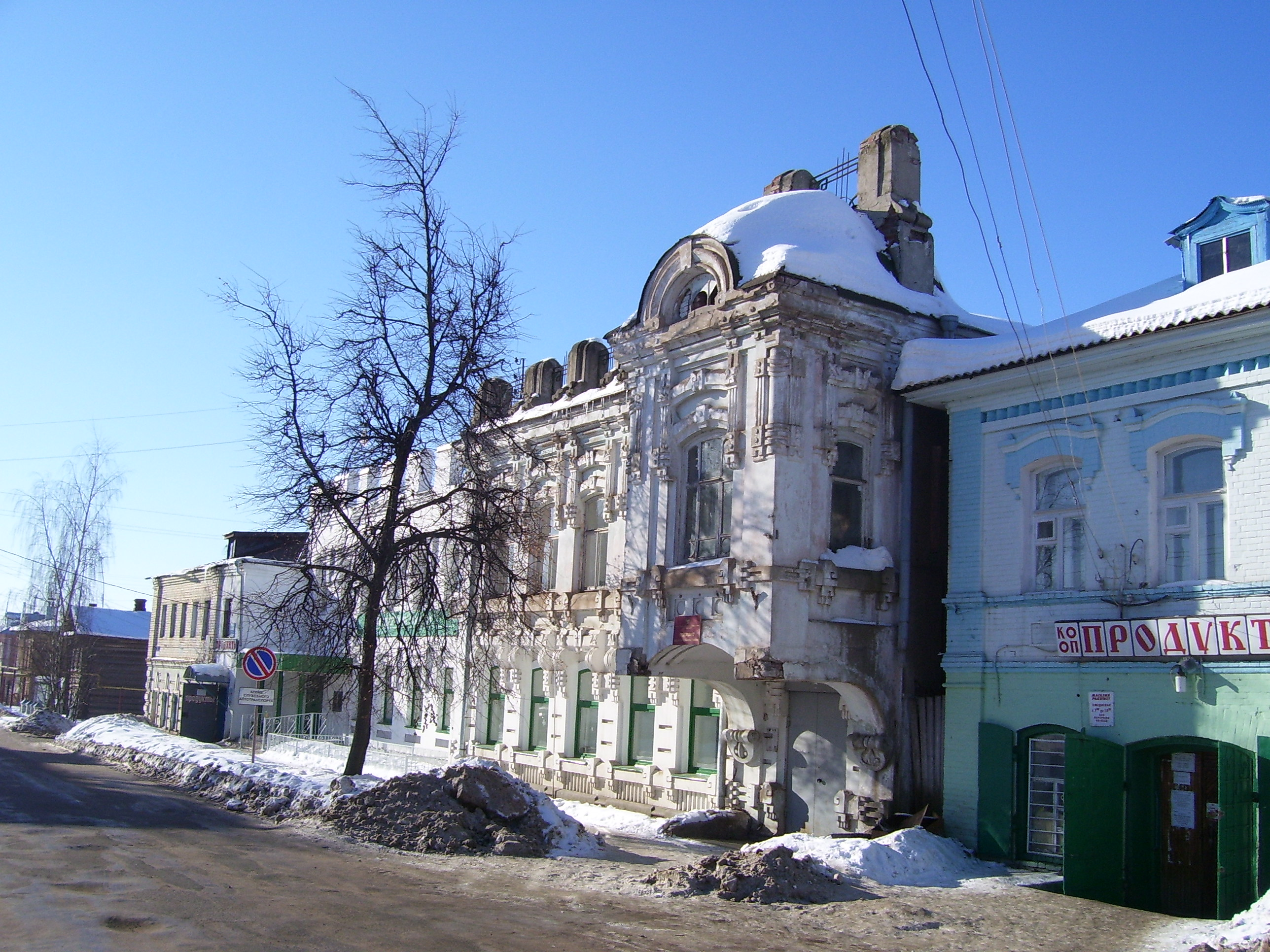
- Street in Bolshoye Murashkino, Bolshemurashkinsky District

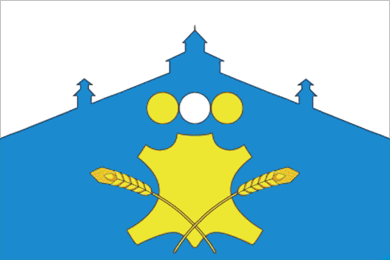
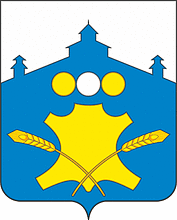
- Flag Coat of arms
- Location of Bolshemurashkinsky District in Nizhny Novgorod Oblast
- Coordinates: 55°46′51″N 44°46′15″E
- Country: Russia
- Federal subject: Nizhny Novgorod Oblast
- Established: 1929
- Administrative center: Bolshoye Murashkino

Area
  - Total: 658.6 km^{2} (254.3 sq mi)

Population (2010 Census)
  - Total: 10,508
  - Density: 15.96/km^{2} (41.32/sq mi)
  - Urban: 52.9%
  - Rural: 47.1%

Administrative structure
  - Administrative divisions: 1 Work settlements, 3 Selsoviets
  - Inhabited localities: 1 urban-type settlements, 48 rural localities

Municipal structure
  - Municipally incorporated as: Bolshemurashkinsky Municipal District
  - Municipal divisions: 1 urban settlements, 3 rural settlements
- Time zone: UTC+3 (MSK)
- OKTMO ID: 22610000
- Website: http://admbmur.ru

Bolshemurashkinsky District (Russian: Большемура́шкинский райо́н) is an administrative district (raion), one of the forty in Nizhny Novgorod Oblast, Russia. Municipally, it is incorporated as Bolshemurashkinsky Municipal District. It is located in the center of the oblast. The area of the district is 658.6 square kilometers (254.3 sq mi). Its administrative center is the urban locality (a work settlement) of Bolshoye Murashkino. Population: 10,508 (2010 Census); 12,585 (2002 census); 13,867 (1989 Soviet census). The population of Bolshoye Murashkino accounts for 52.9% of the district's total population.

== History ==
The district was established in 1929.

== Notable residents ==
- Avvakum (1620/21 in Grigorovo – 1682), protopope of the Kazan Cathedral who led the opposition to Patriarch Nikon's reforms of the Russian Orthodox Church
- Sergei Vaganov (born 1985 in Bolshoye Murashkino), football player
