= Khyzyr Appayev =

Russian footballer

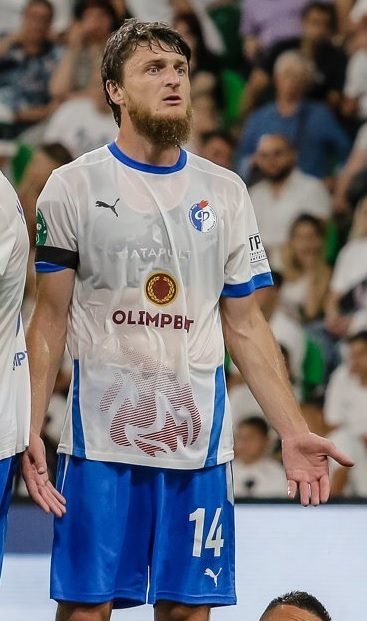
- Appayev with FC Fakel Voronezh in 2022

Personal information
- Full name: Khyzyr Khakimovich Appayev
- Date of birth: 27 January 1990 (age 36)
- Place of birth: Nalchik or Tyrnyauz, Kabardino-Balkaria, Russia
- Height: 1.90 m (6 ft 3 in)
- Position: Centre-forward

Youth career
- DYuSSh Elbrus Nalchik
- Zhemchuzhina Sochi

Senior career*
Years	Team	Apps	(Gls)
2011	Druzhba Maykop	14	(5)
2011–2012	Krylia Sovetov Samara	9	(0)
2012–2014	Krasnodar	3	(0)
2013–2014	→ Rotor Volgograd (loan)	44	(6)
2014–2016	Gazovik Orenburg	65	(9)
2016–2017	Arsenal Tula	13	(0)
2017	Riga	8	(2)
2017	Avangard Kursk	20	(3)
2018	Rotor Volgograd	10	(2)
2018–2019	Tambov	48	(8)
2020	Tekstilshchik Ivanovo	23	(5)
2021–2024	Fakel Voronezh	107	(10)
2024–2025	Baltika Kaliningrad	10	(0)
2025	Nart Cherkessk	7	(0)
- * Club domestic league appearances and goals as of 22 November 2025

Khyzyr Khakimovich Appayev (Russian: Хызыр Хакимович Аппаев; born 27 January 1990) is a Russian former professional footballer who played as a centre-forward.

== Career ==
Appayev made his debut in the Russian Second Division for Druzhba Maykop on 17 April 2011 in a game against Taganrog, with his Russian Premier League debut for Krylia Sovetov Samara coming on 6 March 2012 against Amkar Perm.

On 11 June 2014, Appayev had his contract with Krasnodar terminated by mutual consent.

He was released from his contract by Tambov on 1 January 2020.

On 28 May 2024, his contract with Fakel Voronezh was extended.

On 12 September 2024, Appayev joined Baltika Kaliningrad on a two-season deal. He left Baltika by mutual consent on 8 June 2025.

== Career statistics ==
As of match played 24 May 2025

Appearances and goals by club, season and competition
Club	Season	League			Cup		Europe		Other		Total	
Club	Season	Division	Apps	Goals	Apps	Goals	Apps	Goals	Apps	Goals	Apps	Goals
Druzhba Maykop	2011–12	Russian Second League	14	5	1	0	–		–		15	5
Krylia Sovetov Samara	2011–12	Russian Premier League	9	0	–		–		–		9	0
Krasnodar	2012–13	Russian Premier League	3	0	2	0	–		–		5	0
Rotor Volgograd	2012–13	Russian First League	12	1	–		–		3 (Note: Appearances in the FNL Cup)	0	15	1
Rotor Volgograd	2013–14	Russian First League	32	5	2	0	–		–		34	5
Gazovik Orenburg	2014–15	Russian First League	30	2	4	2	–		1	0	35	4
Gazovik Orenburg	2015–16	Russian First League	35	7	0	0	–		3	0	38	7
Gazovik Orenburg	Total		65	9	4	2	0	0	4	0	73	11
Arsenal Tula	2016–17	Russian Premier League	13	0	1	0	–		–		14	0
Riga FC	2017	Virslīga	8	2	3	1	–		–		11	3
Avangard Kursk	2017–18	Russian First League	20	3	3	0	–		–		23	3
Rotor Volgograd	2017–18	Russian First League	10	2	–		–		5	1	15	3
Tambov	2018–19	Russian First League	35	8	0	0	–		5	2	40	10
Tambov	2019–20	Russian Premier League	13	0	1	0	–		–		14	0
Tambov	Total		48	8	1	0	0	0	5	2	54	10
Tekstilshchik Ivanovo	2019–20	Russian First League	2	0	–		–		–		2	0
Tekstilshchik Ivanovo	2020–21	Russian First League	21	5	2	2	–		–		23	7
Tekstilshchik Ivanovo	Total		23	5	2	2	0	0	0	0	25	7
Fakel Voronezh	2020–21	Russian First League	8	0	–		–		–		8	0
Fakel Voronezh	2021–22	Russian First League	36	7	2	0	–		–		38	7
Fakel Voronezh	2022–23	Russian Premier League	28	3	4	0	–		2 (Note: Appearances in Relegation play-offs)	0	34	3
Fakel Voronezh	2023–24	Russian Premier League	28	0	2	0	–		–		30	0
Fakel Voronezh	2024–25	Russian Premier League	7	0	2	0	—		—		9	0
Fakel Voronezh	Total		107	10	10	0	0	0	2	0	119	10
Baltika Kaliningrad	2024–25	Russian First League	10	0	1	0	–		–		11	0
Career total			374	50	30	5	0	0	19	3	423	58
