= Mikhail Baranovsky =

Belarusian professional football player

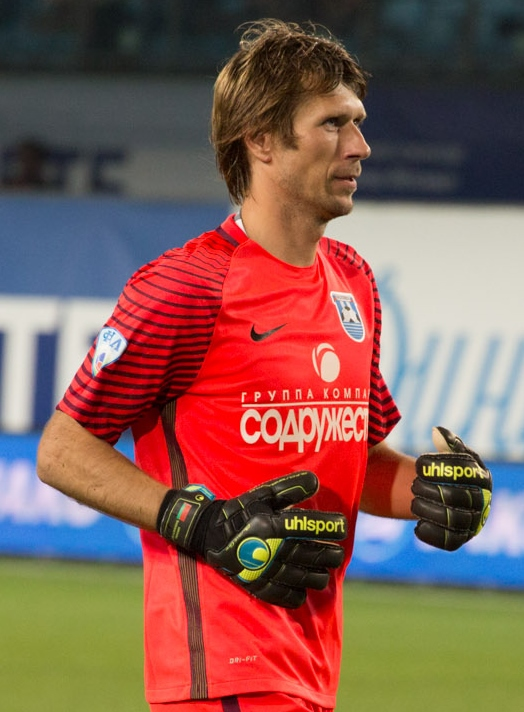
- With Baltika in 2016

Personal information
- Full name: Mikhail Viktorovich Baranovsky
- Date of birth: 4 January 1983 (age 43)
- Place of birth: Dimitrovgrad, Ulyanovsk Oblast, Russian SFSR
- Height: 1.83 m (6 ft 0 in)
- Position: Goalkeeper

Youth career
- Slavia Mozyr

Senior career*
Years	Team	Apps	(Gls)
1999–2000	Mozyr	21	(0)
2001	Khimki	0	(0)
2002–2003	Lada-SOK Dimitrovgrad	26	(0)
2004	Baltika-Tarko Kaliningrad	23	(0)
2005–2009	Baltika Kaliningrad	101	(0)
2007	→ Shakhtyor Soligorsk (loan)	30	(0)
2010–2011	Zhemchuzhina-Sochi	23	(0)
2011	Dynamo Bryansk	26	(0)
2012–2013	Rotor Volgograd	0	(0)
2013–2014	Ufa	19	(0)
2014	Kaluga	10	(0)
2015	Sokol Saratov	4	(0)
2015–2017	Baltika Kaliningrad	43	(0)
2018–2021	Slavia Mozyr	61	(0)
- * Club domestic league appearances and goals as of 31 December 2021

Mikhail Viktorovich Baranovsky (Russian: Михаил Викторович Барановский; born 4 January 1983) is a Belarusian former professional football player.

== Club career ==
He played three games in the 2007 UEFA Intertoto Cup for FC Shakhtyor Soligorsk.

He played one game for the main squad of FC Rotor Volgograd in the Russian Cup.

== Honours ==
- Russian Second Division Zone West best goalkeeper: 2005.
