= Carlos Rúa =

Colombian footballer (born 1992)

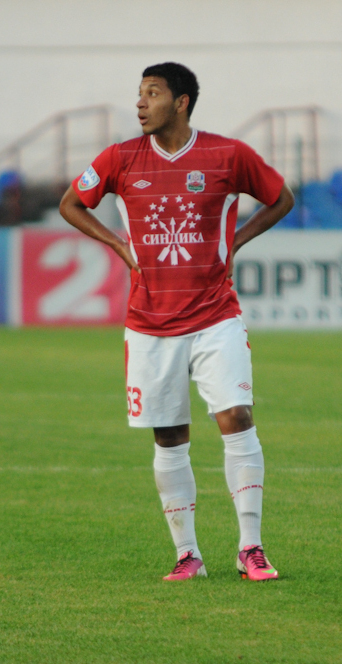

Personal information
- Full name: Carlos Andrés Rúa Flores
- Date of birth: 21 May 1992 (age 34)
- Height: 1.75 m (5 ft 9 in)
- Position: Midfielder

Team information
- Current team: Plaza Amador
- Number: 25

Youth career
- CD Gallegol

Senior career*
Years	Team	Apps	(Gls)
2012	Spartaks Jūrmala	29	(6)
2012	Salyut Belgorod	13	(0)
2013	Spartak Nalchik	33	(5)
2014–2016	Llaneros	24	(4)
2016–2017	Tigres	10	(0)
2018	Deportivo Pasto	6	(0)
2019–	Plaza Amador	14	(0)
- * Club domestic league appearances and goals as of 19:58, 10 May 2019 (UTC)

Carlos Andrés Rúa Flores (born May 21, 1992) is a Colombian football midfielder who currently plays for Plaza Amador.
