= Dmitri Timachev =

Russian footballers

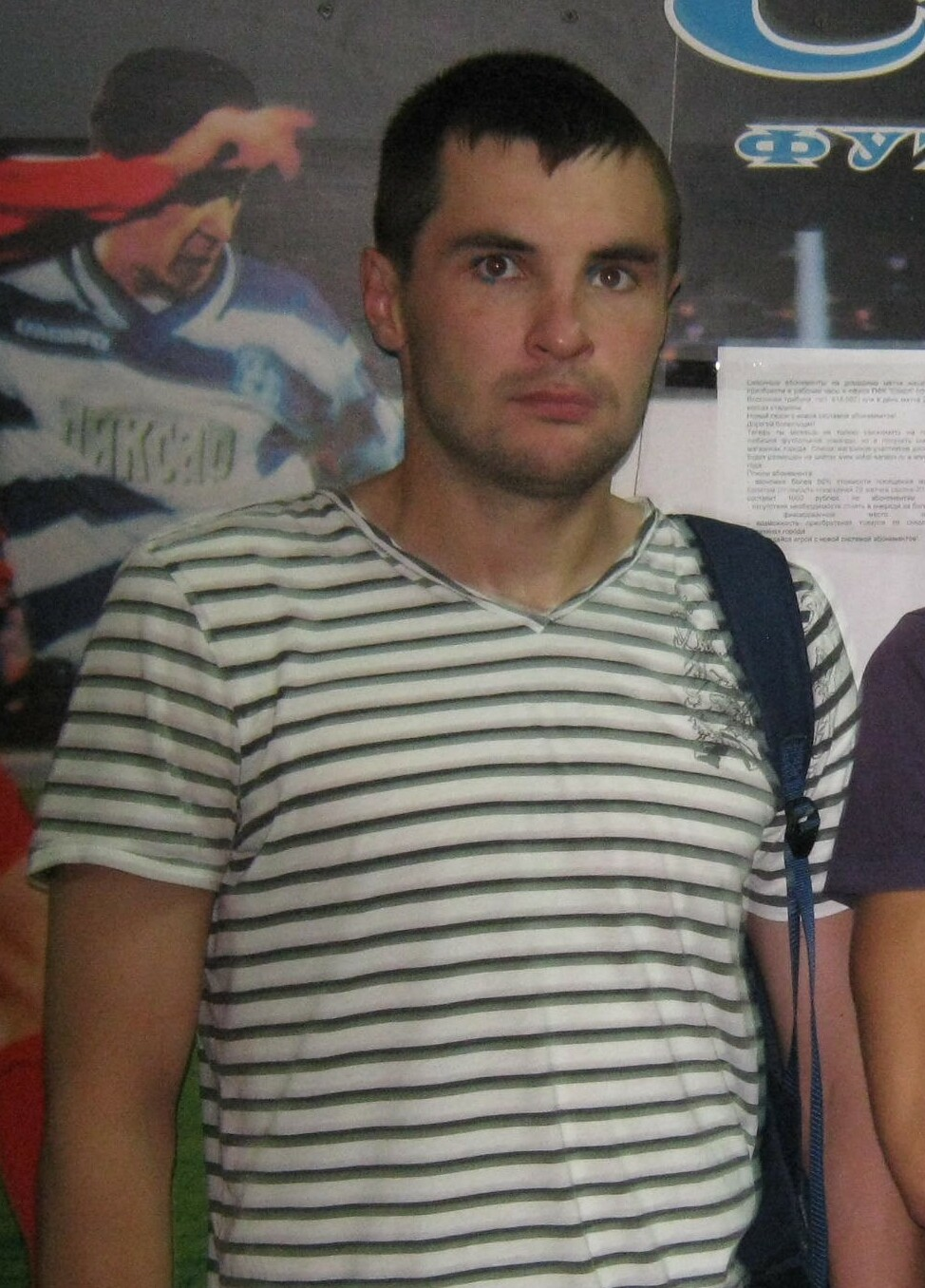
- Timachev in 2012

Personal information
- Full name: Dmitri Vladimirovich Timachev
- Date of birth: 2 February 1983 (age 43)
- Place of birth: Volgograd, Russia
- Height: 1.85 m (6 ft 1 in)
- Position: Defender

Youth career
- Spartak Volgograd
- UOR Volgograd

Senior career*
Years	Team	Apps	(Gls)
2000	FC Dynamo-2 Moscow	17	(0)
2001–2003	FC Dynamo Moscow	0	(0)
2004	FC Metallurg-Kuzbass Novokuznetsk	15	(0)
2005	Dinaburg FC	2	(0)
2007	FC Chernomorets Novorossiysk	20	(2)
2008–2010	FC Avangard Kursk	76	(5)
2011–2012	FC Salyut Belgorod	28	(2)
2012	FC Sokol Saratov	9	(0)
2013	FC Avangard Kursk	23	(0)
2014	FC Olimpia Volgograd	11	(0)
2014–2015	FC Rotor Volgograd	15	(0)
- * Club domestic league appearances and goals

Dmitri Vladimirovich Timachev (Russian: Дмитрий Владимирович Тимачев; born 2 February 1983) is a Russian former professional footballer.

== Club career ==
He made his Russian Football National League debut for FC Metallurg-Kuzbass Novokuznetsk on 27 July 2004 in a game against FC Arsenal Tula.
