= Aleksandr Stavpets =

Russian footballer

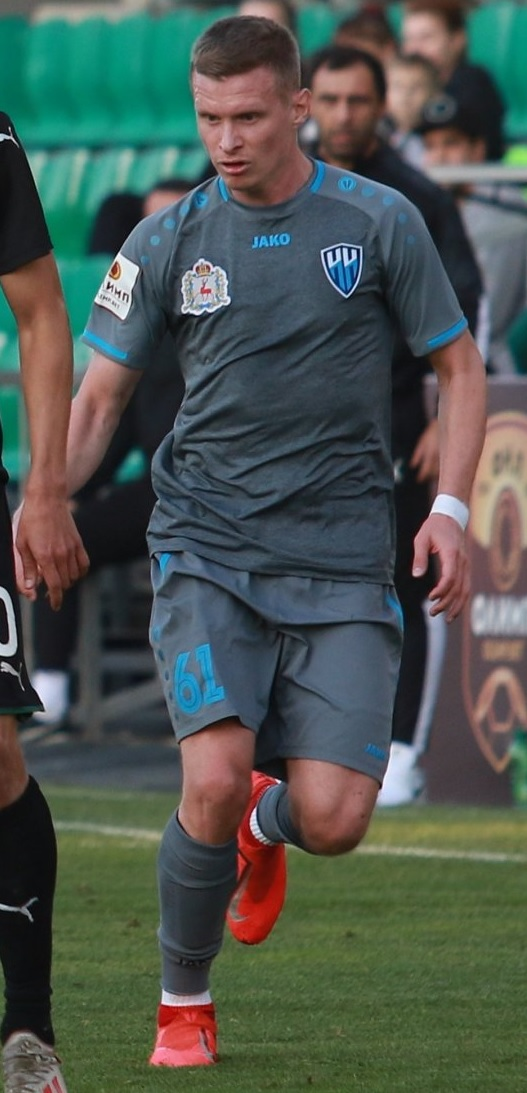
- Stavpets with Nizhny Novgorod in 2019

Personal information
- Full name: Aleksandr Aleksandrovich Stavpets
- Date of birth: 4 July 1989 (age 37)
- Place of birth: Oryol, Soviet Union
- Height: 1.75 m (5 ft 9 in)
- Position: Winger

Youth career
- Olimp Oryol
- Rotor Volgograd

Senior career*
Years	Team	Apps	(Gls)
2006–2007	Rostov	5	(1)
2008–2009	Moscow	34	(1)
2010–2012	Krylia Sovetov Samara	7	(0)
2011–2012	→ Ural Yekaterinburg (loan)	26	(4)
2012–2013	Rotor Volgograd	50	(15)
2014–2018	Ural Yekaterinburg	59	(0)
2017–2018	→ Tyumen (loan)	24	(4)
2018–2019	Tom Tomsk	34	(6)
2019–2021	Nizhny Novgorod	55	(6)
2021–2022	Tom Tomsk	30	(17)
2022–2023	Arsenal Tula	23	(0)
2023	Shinnik Yaroslavl	12	(0)
2024–2025	Maxline Vitebsk	23	(2)
2025	Znamya Truda	10	(0)

International career
2006	Russia U-17	3	(0)
2007–2008	Russia U-19	6	(0)
2009	Russia U-21	2	(1)
- * Club domestic league appearances and goals as of 1 November 2025

Aleksandr Aleksandrovich Stavpets (Russian: Александр Александрович Ставпец; born 4 July 1989) is a Russian footballer.

== Club career ==
He made his Russian Premier League debut for FC Rostov on 16 July 2007 in a game against FC Saturn Ramenskoye.

== Career statistics ==
As of 22 June 2024

Club	Season	League			Cup		Continental		Other		Total	
Club	Season	Division	Apps	Goals	Apps	Goals	Apps	Goals	Apps	Goals	Apps	Goals
Rostov	2007	Russian Premier League	5	1	0	0	–		–		5	1
Moscow	2008	Russian Premier League	15	1	1	1	3 (Note: Appearances in the UEFA Cup)	0	–		19	2
Moscow	2009	Russian Premier League	19	0	3	0	–		–		22	0
Moscow	Total		34	1	4	1	3	0	0	0	41	2
Krylia Sovetov Samara	2010	Russian Premier League	7	0	1	0	–		–		8	0
Ural Yekaterinburg (loan)	2011–12	Russian First League	26	4	–		–		–		26	4
Rotor Volgograd	2012–13	Russian First League	27	9	0	0	–		2 (Note: Appearances in the FNL Cup)	0	29	9
Rotor Volgograd	2013–14	Russian First League	23	6	2	0	–		–		25	6
Rotor Volgograd	Total		50	15	2	0	0	0	2	0	54	15
Ural Yekaterinburg	2013–14	Russian Premier League	7	0	–		–		–		7	0
Ural Yekaterinburg	2014–15	Russian Premier League	18	0	0	0	–		2 (Note: Appearances in the relegation play-offs)	1	20	1
Ural Yekaterinburg	2015–16	Russian Premier League	19	0	1	1	–		–		20	1
Ural Yekaterinburg	2016–17	Russian Premier League	14	0	1	0	–		4	1	19	1
Ural Yekaterinburg	2017–18	Russian Premier League	1	0	–		–		–		1	0
Ural Yekaterinburg	Total		59	0	2	1	0	0	6	2	67	3
Tyumen (loan)	2017–18	Russian First League	24	4	1	0	–		4	2	29	6
Tom Tomsk	2018–19	Russian First League	34	6	1	0	–		2 (Note: Appearances in the promotion play-offs)	0	37	6
Nizhny Novgorod	2019–20	Russian First League	26	4	3	1	–		–		29	5
Nizhny Novgorod	2020–21	Russian First League	29	2	3	1	–		–		32	3
Nizhny Novgorod	Total		55	6	6	2	0	0	0	0	61	8
Tom Tomsk	2021–22	Russian First League	30	17	0	0	–		–		30	17
Arsenal Tula	2022–23	Russian First League	23	0	1	0	–		–		24	0
Arsenal Tula	2023–24	Russian First League	0	0	–		–		–		0	0
Arsenal Tula	Total		23	0	1	0	0	0	0	0	24	0
Shinnik Yaroslavl	2023–24	Russian First League	12	0	2	1	–		–		14	1
Maxline Vitebsk	2024	Belarusian First League	10	1	1	0	–		–		11	1
Career total			369	55	21	5	3	0	14	4	407	64
