= Anatoli Gerk =

Russian footballer

Personal information
- Full name: Anatoli Anatolyevich Gerk
- Date of birth: 20 November 1984 (age 41)
- Place of birth: Polevskoy, Soviet Union
- Height: 1.79 m (5 ft 10 in)
- Position: Midfielder

Youth career
- 1991–2001: Akademika Moscow

Senior career*
| Years | Team | Apps | (Gls) |
| 2002–2005 | Anderlecht | 6 | (0) |
| 2006–2007 | Twente | 9 | (0) |
| 2007–2009 | Saturn Ramenskoye | 0 | (0) |
| 2009 | → Ural (loan) | 34 | (6) |
| 2010 | Ural | 22 | (4) |
| 2011–2012 | Mordovia | 32 | (1) |
| 2012–2013 | Ural | 16 | (2) |
| 2014 | Tambov | 9 | (0) |
| Total | | 128 | (13) |

International career
| 2003 | Russia U19 | 13 | (4) |
| 2005 | Russia U21 | 2 | (1) |
- * Club domestic league appearances and goals

Anatoli Anatolyevich Gerk (Russian: Анатолий Анатольевич Герк; born 20 November 1984) is a Russian former professional footballer who played as a midfielder.

== Club career ==
Gerk previously played for Anderlecht in the Belgian First Division and Twente in the Dutch Eredivisie.

In 2007, Gerk returned to Russia to sign with Saturn Ramenskoye which was managed by Gadzhi Gadzhiyev. He failed to make an appearance for the club, and only played for the reserves, scoring one goal against Shinnik Yaroslavl. In March 2009, he signed a contract with Ural Sverdlovsk Oblast. In 2011, he joined Mordovia Saransk, where he was part of the team winning the second-tier Russian Football National League in the 2011–12 season. In 2012–13, he returned to play for Ural. In 2014, Gerk signed with FC Tambov.

== International career ==
Gerk took part in the 2001 UEFA European Under-16 Championship where he scored the only goal of the Russia team during the tournament against the Turkey, which proved to also be the 1–0 winner.

== Honours ==
Anderlecht

- Belgian First Division: 2003–04

Mordovia Saransk

- Russian Football National League: 2011–12

Ural Sverdlovsk Oblast

- Russian Football National League: 2012–13
