= Deviko Khinchagov =

Russian-Georgian-Azerbaijani footballer

Personal information
- Full name: Deviko Gochayevich Khinchagov
- Date of birth: 4 September 1987 (age 39)
- Place of birth: Kaspi, Georgian SSR
- Height: 1.78 m (5 ft 10 in)
- Positions: Midfielder; defender

Senior career*
Years	Team	Apps	(Gls)
2003	FC Krasnodar-2000	0	(0)
2006	FC Tekstilshchik Kamyshin	9	(0)
2007–2008	FK Masallı	21	(0)
2009	FC MITOS Novocherkassk (amateur)		
2010–2012	FC MITOS Novocherkassk	58	(0)
2012–2013	FC Rotor Volgograd	9	(0)
2013–2014	FC Sakhalin Yuzhno-Sakhalinsk	10	(1)
2014–2015	FC MITOS Novocherkassk	26	(1)
2015–2017	FC SKA Rostov-on-Don	62	(0)
2018	FC Kaluga	6	(1)
2018	FC Kubanskaya Korona Shevchenko		
- * Club domestic league appearances and goals

Deviko Gochayevich Khinchagov (Russian: Девико Гочаевич Хинчагов; born 4 September 1987) is a Russian former professional football player.

He also holds Georgian and Azerbaijani citizenships and is known as Deviko Khinjazov and Deviko Kenkadze.

== Club career ==
He played in the Russian Football National League for FC Rotor Volgograd in the 2012–13 season.
