= Ilya Zinin =

Russian footballer

Personal information
- Full name: Ilya Yuryevich Zinin
- Date of birth: 9 November 1986 (age 39)
- Place of birth: Vladimir, Russian SFSR
- Height: 1.73 m (5 ft 8 in)
- Position: Midfielder

Senior career*
Years	Team	Apps	(Gls)
2005–2012	FC Torpedo Vladimir	194	(20)
2012–2014	FC Rotor Volgograd	39	(1)
2014–2019	FC Torpedo Vladimir	113	(24)
- * Club domestic league appearances and goals

Ilya Yuryevich Zinin (Russian: Илья Юрьевич Зинин; born 9 November 1986) is a former Russian professional football player.

== Club career ==
He made his Russian Football National League debut for FC Torpedo Vladimir on 4 April 2011 in a game against FC Alania Vladikavkaz.
