= Vasili Karmazinenko =

Russian footballer

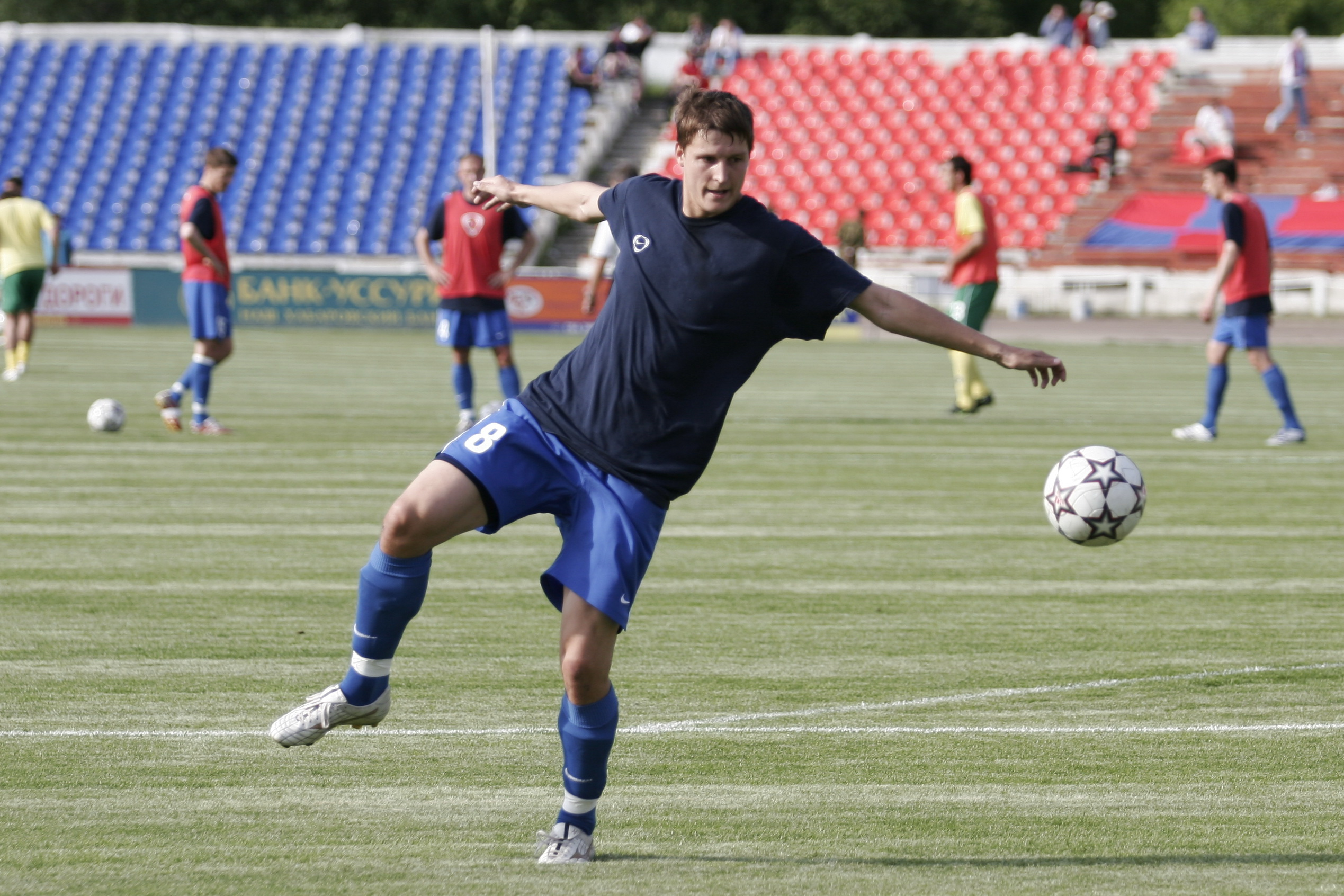

Personal information
- Full name: Vasili Sergeyevich Karmazinenko
- Date of birth: 10 August 1983 (age 43)
- Place of birth: Okha, Russian SFSR
- Height: 1.82 m (5 ft 11 1/2 in)
- Positions: Forward; midfielder

Team information
- Current team: FC SKA-Khabarovsk-2 (assistant coach)

Senior career*
| Years | Team | Apps | (Gls) |
| 2002 | FC Portovik Kholmsk (amateur) | | |
| 2003–2010 | FC SKA-Energiya Khabarovsk | 272 | (75) |
| 2011 | FC Sibir Novosibirsk | 28 | (7) |
| 2012 | FC Volgar-Gazprom Astrakhan | 0 | (0) |
| 2012–2013 | FC Rotor Volgograd | 18 | (2) |
| 2013–2015 | FC SKA-Energiya Khabarovsk | 69 | (6) |
| 2016 | FC Sakhalin Yuzhno-Sakhalinsk | 6 | (0) |

Managerial career
- 2021–2024: FC SKA-Khabarovsk (academy)
- 2024–: FC SKA-Khabarovsk-2 (assistant)
- * Club domestic league appearances and goals

Vasili Sergeyevich Karmazinenko (Russian: Василий Серге́евич Кармазиненко; born 10 August 1983) is a Russian professional football coach and a former player who is an assistant coach with FC SKA-Khabarovsk-2.

== Club career ==
He played 14 seasons in the Russian Football National League for FC SKA-Energiya Khabarovsk, FC Sibir Novosibirsk and FC Rotor Volgograd.
