= Denis Pchelintsev =

Russian footballer and coach

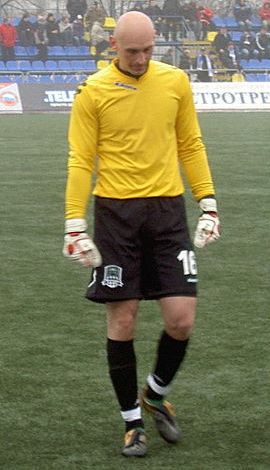

Personal information
- Full name: Denis Yuryevich Pchelintsev
- Date of birth: 1 December 1979 (age 46)
- Place of birth: Novonikolayevsky, Russian SFSR
- Height: 1.85 m (6 ft 1 in)
- Position: Goalkeeper

Team information
- Current team: FC Arsenal Tula (GK coach)

Youth career
- VUOR Volgograd

Senior career*
Years	Team	Apps	(Gls)
1996–1997	FC Rotor-d Volgograd	4	(0)
1998–2000	FC Rotor-2 Volgograd	57	(0)
2001	FC Rotor Volgograd	0	(0)
2001	FC Energetik Uren	10	(0)
2002–2004	FC KAMAZ Naberezhnye Chelny	29	(0)
2005	FC Metallurg-Kuzbass Novokuznetsk	13	(0)
2006	FC KAMAZ Naberezhnye Chelny	0	(0)
2006–2008	FC Nosta Novotroitsk	58	(0)
2009–2012	FC Krasnodar	58	(0)
2012	→ FC Baltika Kaliningrad (loan)	3	(0)
2012–2014	FC Rotor Volgograd	62	(0)
2014–2015	FC Shinnik Yaroslavl	8	(0)
2015–2016	FC Sokol Saratov	29	(0)

Managerial career
- 2016–2019: FC Rotor Volgograd (GK coach)
- 2021–2023: FC Krasnodar-2 (GK coach)
- 2023–: FC Arsenal Tula (GK coach)
- * Club domestic league appearances and goals

Denis Yuryevich Pchelintsev (Russian: Денис Юрьевич Пчелинцев; born 1 December 1979) is a Russian professional football coach and a former player who is the goalkeepers' coach with FC Arsenal Tula.

== Club career ==
He played 11 seasons in the Russian Football National League for 8 different teams.
