= Sergei Vaganov =

Russian footballer

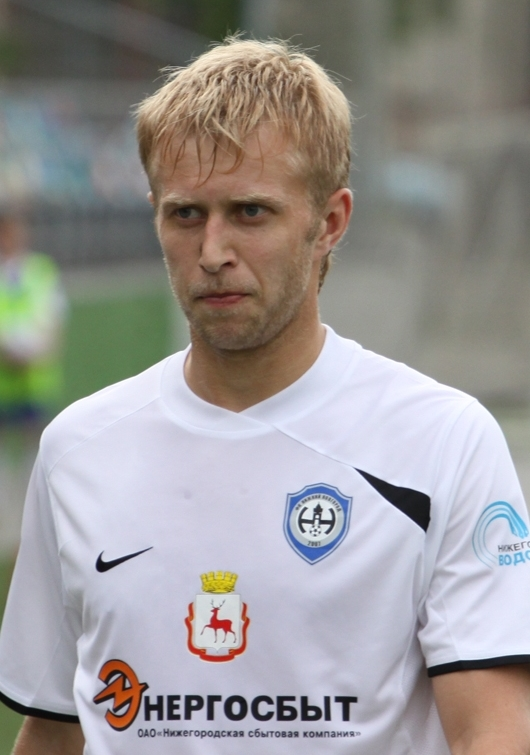

Personal information
- Full name: Sergei Konstantinovich Vaganov
- Date of birth: 1 July 1985 (age 41)
- Place of birth: Bolshoye Murashkino, Nizhny Novgorod Oblast, Russian SFSR
- Height: 1.76 m (5 ft 9 in)
- Positions: Midfielder; forward

Senior career*
Years	Team	Apps	(Gls)
2003–2005	FC Lokomotiv-NN Nizhny Novgorod	88	(5)
2006–2008	FC Mordovia Saransk	75	(8)
2008–2012	FC Nizhny Novgorod	122	(10)
2012	FC Volga Nizhny Novgorod	0	(0)
2012	→ FC Rotor Volgograd (loan)	14	(0)
2013	FC Rotor Volgograd	12	(1)
2013–2014	FC Mordovia Saransk	4	(0)
2014	FC Luch-Energiya Vladivostok	20	(0)
2015	FC Baltika Kaliningrad	11	(0)
2015–2016	FC SKA-Energiya Khabarovsk	35	(2)
2016	FC Olimpiyets Nizhny Novgorod	5	(0)
2017	FC Nosta Novotroitsk	7	(1)
2017–2018	FC Mordovia Saransk	20	(1)
2018–2019	FC Murom	22	(0)
- * Club domestic league appearances and goals

Sergei Konstantinovich Vaganov (Russian: Серге́й Константинович Ваганов; born 1 July 1985) is a Russian former professional football player.

== Club career ==
He played 9 seasons in the Russian Football National League for 6 different clubs.
