= Bolshoye Murashkino, Nizhny Novgorod Oblast =

Bolshoye Murashkino Большое Мурашкино
- Urban-type settlement
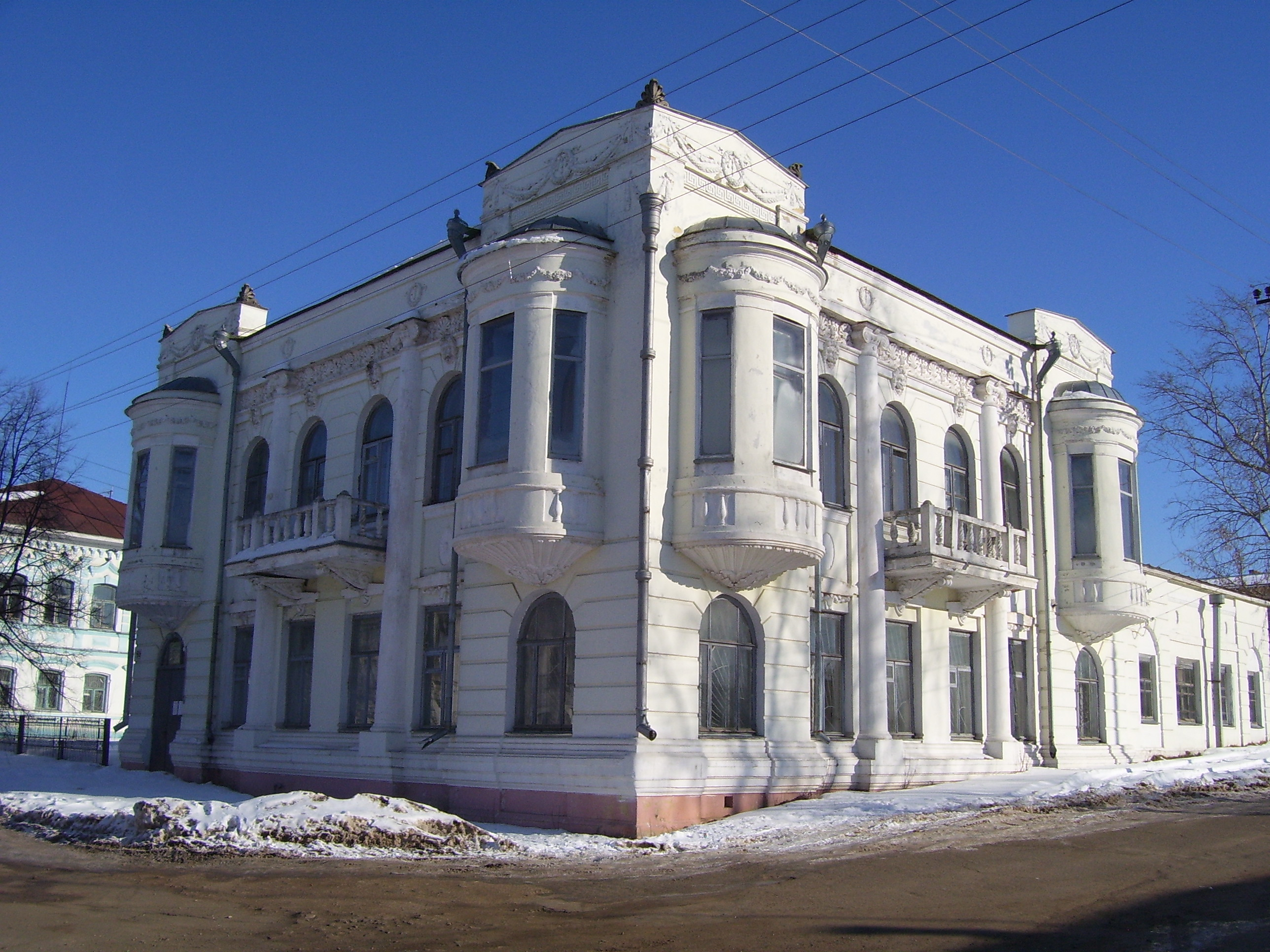
- Interactive map of Bolshoye Murashkino
- Location of Bolshoye Murashkino Bolshoye Murashkino (Nizhny Novgorod Oblast)
- Coordinates: 55.7834°N 44.7764°E
- Country: Russia
- Federal subject: Nizhny Novgorod Oblast
- Administrative district: Bolshemurashkinsky District
- Elevation: 135 m (443 ft)

Population (2010 Census)
  - Total: 5,554
  - Estimate (2025): 5,474 (−1.4%)
- Time zone: UTC+3 (MSK)
- Postal code: 606360
- OKTMO ID: 22610151051

Bolshoye Murashkino (Russian: Большо́е Мура́шкино) is an urban locality (an urban-type settlement) in Bolshemurashkinsky District of Nizhny Novgorod Oblast, Russia. Population: 5,554 (2010 census); 6,377 (2002 census); 6,728 (1989 Soviet census).
