= Semyon Fomin =

Russian professional footballer

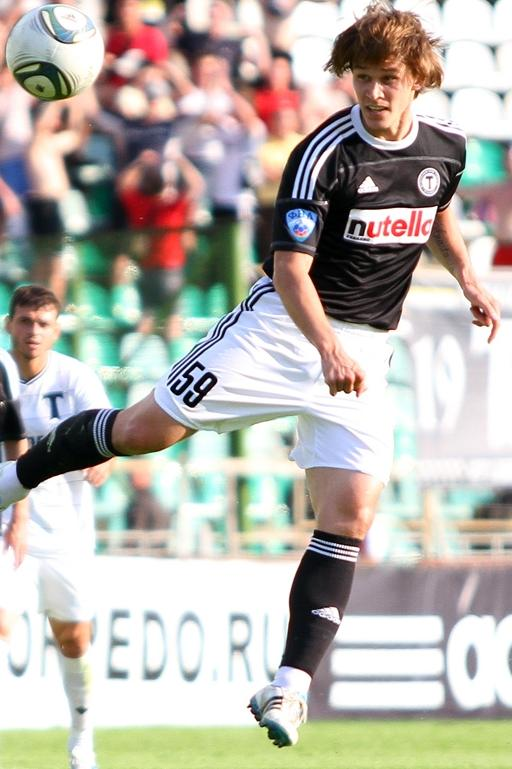

Personal information
- Full name: Semyon Anatolyevich Fomin
- Date of birth: 10 January 1989 (age 37)
- Place of birth: Vladivostok, Russian SFSR
- Height: 1.80 m (5 ft 11 in)
- Position: Midfielder

Youth career
- 2005: FC Lokomotiv Moscow

Senior career*
Years	Team	Apps	(Gls)
2006–2013	FC Lokomotiv Moscow	0	(0)
2008	→ FC Zvezda Irkutsk (loan)	18	(0)
2010	→ FC Lokomotiv-2 Moscow (loan)	26	(0)
2011	→ FC Torpedo Vladimir (loan)	19	(8)
2011–2012	→ PFC Spartak Nalchik (loan)	15	(1)
2012–2013	→ FC Rotor Volgograd (loan)	28	(2)
2013–2014	FC Rotor Volgograd	30	(3)
2014–2015	FC Torpedo Moscow	15	(1)
2015–2016	FC Ufa	13	(1)
2017–2018	FC Luch-Energiya Vladivostok	30	(1)
2018	FC Tom Tomsk	16	(0)
2019–2020	FC Tyumen	30	(1)

International career
2005–2006	Russia U17	10	(3)
2007–2008	Russia U19	8	(2)
2011	Russia-2	1	(0)
- * Club domestic league appearances and goals

Semyon Anatolyevich Fomin (Russian: Семён Анатольевич Фомин; born 10 January 1989) is a Russian former professional footballer. He played as a midfielder.

== Club career ==
He made his professional debut in the Russian First Division in 2008 for FC Zvezda Irkutsk. He played one game in the 2007–08 UEFA Cup for FC Lokomotiv Moscow against Panathinaikos.

He made his Russian Premier League debut for PFC Spartak Nalchik on 16 October 2011 in a game against FC Anzhi Makhachkala.

== International career ==
Fomin was an integral part of the Russian U-17 squad that won the 2006 UEFA U-17 Championship.
