= 2012–13 Russian Football National League =

Russian National Football League
- Season: 2012–13
- Champions: Ural Sverdlovsk Oblast
- Promoted: Ural Sverdlovsk Oblast; Tom Tomsk
- Relegated: Khimki; Volgar
- Matches: 272
- Goals: 567 (2.08 per match)
- Top goalscorer: Spartak Gogniyev (17 goals)

The 2012–13 Russian National Football League was the 21st season of Russia's second-tier football league since the dissolution of the Soviet Union. The season began on 9 July 2012 and ended on 26 May 2013.

== Teams ==
Location of the teams participating in the 2012–13 season

== League table ==
Pos	Team	Pld	W	D	L	GF	GA	GD	Pts	Promotion or relegation
1	Ural Sverdlovsk Oblast (C, P)	32	19	11	2	61	18	+43	68	Promotion to Premier League
2	Tom Tomsk (P)	32	19	8	5	57	34	+23	65	Promotion to Premier League
3	Spartak Nalchik	32	15	8	9	32	27	+5	53	Qualification for promotion play-offs
4	SKA-Khabarovsk	32	13	13	6	36	26	+10	52	Qualification for promotion play-offs
5	Baltika Kaliningrad	32	14	8	10	40	33	+7	50	
6	Ufa	32	13	9	10	31	30	+1	48	
7	Neftekhimik Nizhnekamsk	32	13	8	11	44	40	+4	47	
8	Sibir Novosibirsk	32	12	9	11	34	38	−4	45	
9	Rotor Volgograd	32	11	8	13	27	26	+1	41	
10	Yenisey Krasnoyarsk	32	9	12	11	30	31	−1	39 (Note: Head-to-head record: Yenisey – Shinnik 2–1, Shinnik – Yenisey 0–0.)	
11	Shinnik Yaroslavl	32	9	12	11	28	33	−5	39	
12	Petrotrest St. Petersburg	32	10	5	17	28	43	−15	35	
13	Salyut Belgorod	32	8	11	13	25	31	−6	35	
14	Torpedo Moscow	32	6	15	11	29	38	−9	33	
15	Metallurg-Kuzbass Novokuznetsk	32	8	6	18	19	40	−21	30	
16	Khimki (R)	32	6	10	16	23	40	−17	28	Relegation to Professional Football League
17	Volgar Astrakhan (R)	32	5	11	16	23	39	−16	26	Relegation to Professional Football League

Source: FNL, Soccerway
Rules for classification: 1st points; 2nd matches won; 3rd head-to-head (points, matches won, goal difference, goals scored, away goals scored); 4th goal difference; 5th goals scored; 6th away goals scored
(C) Champions; (P) Promoted; (R) Relegated

== Results ==
Home \ Away	BAL	KHI	MET	NEF	PET	ROT	SAL	SHI	SIB	SKA	SPN	TOM	TOR	UFA	URA	VOL	YEN
Baltika Kaliningrad		1–1	1–0	0–0	2–0	0–1	2–0	0–0	0–3	1–1	1–0	1–3	3–1	1–1	0–2	2–0	3–0
Khimki	1–2		0–0	0–0	1–0	1–0	0–2	0–0	0–0	0–2	2–1	1–2	2–4	0–1	0–0	2–4	1–2
Metallurg-Kuzbass Novokuznetsk	2–5	0–0		3–1	0–0	2–1	1–0	1–0	1–0	1–0	0–0	2–3	1–3	0–1	0–0	1–0	1–0
Neftekhimik Nizhnekamsk	1–0	1–2	2–1		2–0	0–2	3–0	1–2	0–1	1–1	3–0	3–3	2–0	1–0	2–2	3–1	1–0
Petrotrest St. Petersburg	0–1	0–0	3–1	0–1		0–3	1–1	3–1	3–2	1–2	0–2	1–3	1–0	2–1	0–0	1–0	2–1
Rotor Volgograd	3–0	1–0	1–0	2–1	2–0		0–1	0–0	2–0	1–2	0–1	1–0	0–0	0–1	0–4	3–1	0–1
Salyut Belgorod	2–2	0–1	1–0	2–0	0–1	1–0		0–0	1–2	0–1	0–1	1–1	1–1	1–1	0–1	2–2	2–1
Shinnik Yaroslavl	0–2	0–1	2–0	2–1	1–0	1–0	1–0		0–0	2–2	0–1	2–1	3–2	1–0	1–1	1–1	0–0
Sibir Novosibirsk	3–1	2–1	1–0	1–2	2–0	1–1	1–1	2–2		1–0	0–0	0–2	1–1	0–1	1–3	1–0	0–3
SKA-Khabarovsk	1–0	4–0	1–0	0–0	2–1	1–1	0–3	2–0	1–2		1–0	1–1	1–1	0–0	0–2	3–1	1–0
Spartak Nalchik	2–0	1–0	1–0	1–3	0–2	1–1	0–0	3–2	2–0	1–0		2–0	2–1	1–0	3–2	3–1	0–2
Tom Tomsk	2–2	3–2	2–0	4–3	2–1	3–0	2–0	3–1	2–0	2–2	1–1		2–1	0–0	3–2	1–0	2–0
Torpedo Moscow	1–1	0–0	1–1	2–3	1–0	0–0	0–1	1–0	1–1	0–0	1–1	1–0		2–2	2–3	0–0	0–0
Ufa	0–2	3–2	2–0	2–0	1–2	1–0	1–1	2–1	1–1	1–1	1–0	0–2	3–0		0–2	1–1	1–2
Ural Sverdlovsk Oblast	1–0	1–0	6–0	3–0	4–0	1–1	2–0	0–0	5–2	1–1	0–0	2–0	3–0	4–0		1–0	1–1
Volgar Astrakhan	0–2	1–1	1–0	1–1	3–2	1–0	1–0	1–1	0–1	0–1	0–0	0–1	0–1	0–1	1–1		1–1
Yenisey Krasnoyarsk	1–2	2–1	1–0	2–2	1–1	0–0	1–1	2–1	1–2	1–1	3–1	1–1	0–0	0–1	0–1	0–0	

Source: Soccerway
Legend: Blue = home team win; Yellow = draw; Red = away team win.

== Statistics ==
=== Top goalscorers ===
Rank	Player	Team	Goals
1	(Russia) Spartak Gogniyev	Ural	17
2	(Russia) Igor Portnyagin	Neftekhimik	16
3	(Russia) Andrei Myazin	Petrotrest	14
4	(Russia) Aleksei Medvedev	Sibir / Spartak	12
5	(Russia) Aleksandr Dimidko	Tom	10
6	(Armenia) Mikhail Markosov	Ufa	9
6	(Russia) Valeri Sorokin	Tom	9
6	(Russia) Aleksandr Stavpets	Rotor	9
6	(Russia) Dmitri Sysuyev	Baltika	9
